= 2014 AVP Pro Beach Volleyball Tour =

- League: Association of Volleyball Professionals
- Sport: Beach volleyball
- Duration: May 29 – September 21, 2014
- TV partner(s): NBC; NBCSN

Seasons
- ← 2013 2015 →

The 2014 AVP Pro Beach Volleyball Tour was a domestic professional beach volleyball circuit organized in the United States by the Association of Volleyball Professionals (AVP) for the 2014 beach volleyball season.

== Schedule ==
This is the complete schedule of events on the 2014 calendar, with team progression documented from the semifinals stage. All tournaments consisted of single-elimination qualifying rounds followed by a double-elimination main draw.

=== Men ===
Tournament	Champions	Runners-up	Semifinalist #1	Semifinalist #2
St. Petersburg Open; St. Petersburg, Florida; US$75,000; May 29 – June 1	Brad Keenan (USA); John Mayer (USA); 16-21, 21–19, 18-16 (1:06)	Jake Gibb (USA); Casey Patterson (USA)	Phil Dalhausser (USA); Sean Rosenthal (USA)	Tri Bourne (USA); John Hyden (USA)
Milwaukee Open; Milwaukee, Wisconsin; US$75,000; July 3–6	Tri Bourne (USA); John Hyden (USA); 21-15, 21-18 (0:56)	Phil Dalhausser (USA); Sean Rosenthal (USA)	Jake Gibb (USA); Casey Patterson (USA)	Ryan Doherty (USA); Nick Lucena (USA)
Salt Lake City Open; Salt Lake City, Utah; US$75,000; August 7–10	Jake Gibb (USA); Casey Patterson (USA); 17-21, 21–17, 17-15 (1:05)	Ryan Doherty (USA); Nick Lucena (USA)	Theo Brunner (USA); Todd Rogers (USA)	Tri Bourne (USA); John Hyden (USA)
Manhattan Beach Open; Manhattan Beach, California; US$75,000; August 14–17	Phil Dalhausser (USA); Sean Rosenthal (USA); 21-17, 21-13 (0:45)	Theo Brunner (USA); Todd Rogers (USA)	Tri Bourne (USA); John Hyden (USA)	Brad Keenan (USA); John Mayer (USA)
Cincinnati Open; Cincinnati, Ohio; US$75,000; August 28–31	Jake Gibb (USA); Casey Patterson (USA); 21-13, 23-21 (0:47)	Ryan Doherty (USA); Nick Lucena (USA)	Jeremy Casebeer (USA); Casey Jennings (USA)	Tri Bourne (USA); John Hyden (USA)
Atlantic City Open; Atlantic City, New Jersey; US$75,000; September 5–7	Jake Gibb (USA); Casey Patterson (USA); 21-15, 21-14 (0:47)	Ryan Doherty (USA); Nick Lucena (USA)	Adrian Carambula (ITA); Stafford Slick (USA)	Billy Allen (USA); Trevor Crabb (USA)
AVP Championships; Huntington Beach, California; US$100,000; September 18–21	Jake Gibb (USA); Casey Patterson (USA); 21-16, 15–21, 15-10 (1:09)	Tri Bourne (USA); John Hyden (USA)	Ryan Doherty (USA); Nick Lucena (USA)	Adrian Carambula (ITA); Stafford Slick (USA)

=== Women ===
Tournament	Champions	Runners-up	Semifinalist #1	Semifinalist #2
St. Petersburg Open; St. Petersburg, Florida; US$75,000; May 29 – June 1	April Ross (USA); Kerri Walsh Jennings (USA); 19-21, 21–15, 15-11 (1:08)	Lauren Fendrick (USA); Brooke Sweat (USA)	Emily Day (USA); Summer Ross (USA)	Lane Carico (USA); Brittany Hochevar (USA)
Milwaukee Open; Milwaukee, Wisconsin; US$75,000; July 3–6	April Ross (USA); Kerri Walsh Jennings (USA); 15-21, 21–16, 15-13 (1:05)	Lauren Fendrick (USA); Brooke Sweat (USA)	Lane Carico (USA); Brittany Hochevar (USA)	Jennifer Fopma (USA); Whitney Pavlik (USA)
Salt Lake City Open; Salt Lake City, Utah; US$75,000; August 7–10	April Ross (USA); Kerri Walsh Jennings (USA); 21-16, 21-15 (0:50)	Lauren Fendrick (USA); Brooke Sweat (USA)	Heather McGuire (USA); Whitney Pavlik (USA)	Emily Day (USA); Summer Ross (USA)
Manhattan Beach Open; Manhattan Beach, California; US$75,000; August 14–17	April Ross (USA); Kerri Walsh Jennings (USA); 19-21, 21–13, 9-0 retired (1:08)	Lauren Fendrick (USA); Brooke Sweat (USA)	Lane Carico (USA); Kim DiCello (USA)	Emily Day (USA); Summer Ross (USA)
Cincinnati Open; Cincinnati, Ohio; US$75,000; August 28–31	April Ross (USA); Kerri Walsh Jennings (USA); 21-14, 21-15 (0:50)	Lauren Fendrick (USA); Brooke Sweat (USA)	Lane Carico (USA); Kim DiCello (USA)	Brittany Hochevar (USA); Ali McColloch (USA)
Atlantic City Open; Atlantic City, New Jersey; US$75,000; September 5–7	April Ross (USA); Kerri Walsh Jennings (USA); 21-19, 21-12 (0:45)	Emily Day (USA); Summer Ross (USA)	Lane Carico (USA); Kim DiCello (USA)	Kathryn Piening (USA); Megan Wallin-Brockway (USA)
AVP Championships; Huntington Beach, California; US$100,000; September 18–21	April Ross (USA); Kerri Walsh Jennings (USA); 22-20, 21-17 (0:59)	Heather McGuire (USA); Whitney Pavlik (USA)	Lauren Fendrick (USA); Brooke Sweat (USA)	Lane Carico (USA); Kim DiCello (USA)

== Milestones and events ==
St. Petersburg Open

- Kerri Walsh Jennings won her 67th AVP tournament, breaking the record for most AVP tournament wins.

Manhattan Beach Open

- Kerri Walsh Jennings won her seventh Manhattan Beach Open, breaking the record for the most Manhattan Beach Open titles by a female player.

== Points distribution ==
Finish	US$150,000 tournaments	US$200,000 tournaments
1	750	1050
2	640	896
3	540	756
5	450	630
7	370	518
9	300	420
13	240	336
15	210	294
17	190	266
19	170	238
21	150	210
25	120	168
-1	100	140
-2	82	114
-3	66	92
-4	52	72

== Awards ==
The 2014 AVP year-end award winners were announced on November 19. The season's top performers were chosen based on statistics, player votes and AVP national ranking points earned during the year.

Award	Men	Women
Best blocker	Theo Brunner (USA)	Lauren Fendrick (USA)
Best server	Brad Keenan (USA)	April Ross (USA)
Best defender	Nick Lucena (USA)	Brooke Sweat (USA)
Best Offensive Player	Tri Bourne (USA)	Kerri Walsh Jennings (USA)
Most Improved Player	Jeremy Casebeer (USA)	Kim DiCello (USA)
Newcomer of the Year	Trevor Crabb (USA)	Amanda Dowdy (USA)
Most valuable player	Jake Gibb (USA)	April Ross (USA)
Team of the Year	Casey Patterson (USA); Jake Gibb (USA)	April Ross (USA); Kerri Walsh Jennings (USA)
