= 2016 AVP Pro Beach Volleyball Tour =

- League: Association of Volleyball Professionals
- Sport: Beach volleyball
- Duration: April 14 – September 4, 2016
- TV partner(s): NBC; NBCSN

Seasons
- ← 2015 2017 →

The 2016 AVP Pro Beach Volleyball Tour was a domestic professional beach volleyball circuit organized in the United States by the Association of Volleyball Professionals (AVP) for the 2016 beach volleyball season.

== Schedule ==
This is the complete schedule of events on the 2016 calendar, with team progression documented from the semifinals stage. All tournaments consisted of single-elimination qualifying rounds followed by a double-elimination main draw.

=== Men ===
Tournament	Champions	Runners-up	Semifinalist #1	Semifinalist #2
New Orleans Open; New Orleans, Louisiana; US$75,000; April 14–17	Ryan Doherty (USA); John Mayer (USA); 21-17, 15-8 (1:09)	Jake Gibb (USA); Casey Patterson (USA)	Mark Burik (USA); Russ Marchewka (USA)	Taylor Crabb (USA); Trevor Crabb (USA)
Huntington Beach Open; Huntington Beach, California; US$75,000; May 5–8	Jake Gibb (USA); Casey Patterson (USA); 21-19, 23-21 (0:49)	Taylor Crabb (USA); Trevor Crabb (USA)	Billy Allen (USA); Theo Brunner (USA)	Ryan Doherty (USA); John Mayer (USA)
Seattle Open; Seattle, Washington; US$75,000; June 2–5	Billy Allen (USA); Theo Brunner (USA); 21-19, 19-21, 15-12 (1:15)	Taylor Crabb (USA); Trevor Crabb (USA)	Jake Gibb (USA); Casey Patterson (USA)	Avery Drost (USA); Gregg Weaver (USA)
New York City Open; New York City, New York; US$75,000; June 16–19	Phil Dalhausser (USA); Nick Lucena (USA); 21-19, 21-12 (0:50)	Jeremy Casebeer (USA); Sean Rosenthal (USA)	Avery Drost (USA); Gregg Weaver (USA)	Taylor Crabb (USA); Trevor Crabb (USA)
San Francisco Open; San Francisco, California; US$75,000; June 23–26	Jake Gibb (USA); Casey Patterson (USA); 18-21, 21-15, 15-10 (0:54)	Taylor Crabb (USA); Trevor Crabb (USA)	Ty Loomis (USA); Marty Lorenz (USA)	John Mayer (USA); Stafford Slick (USA)
Manhattan Beach Open; Manhattan Beach, California; US$100,000; July 14–17	Jake Gibb (USA); Casey Patterson (USA); 17-21, 21-18, 16-14 (1:07)	Tri Bourne (USA); John Hyden (USA)	Phil Dalhausser (USA); Nick Lucena (USA)	Taylor Crabb (USA); Trevor Crabb (USA)
AVP Championships; Chicago, Illinois; US$100,000; September 1–4	Phil Dalhausser (USA); Nick Lucena (USA); 21-13, 21-7 (0:49)	Tri Bourne (USA); John Hyden (USA)	Taylor Crabb (USA); Trevor Crabb (USA)	Ryan Doherty (USA); John Mayer (USA)

=== Women ===
Tournament	Champions	Runners-up	Semifinalist #1	Semifinalist #2
New Orleans Open; New Orleans, Louisiana; US$75,000; April 14–17	Kim DiCello (USA); Kendra VanZwieten (USA); 21-19, 19-21, 15-13 (1:00)	Angela Bensend (USA); Geena Urango (USA)	Jenny Kropp (USA); Misty May-Treanor (USA)	Amanda Dowdy (USA); Emily Stockman (USA)
Huntington Beach Open; Huntington Beach, California; US$75,000; May 5–8	April Ross (USA); Kerri Walsh Jennings (USA); 21-13, 21-16 (0:55)	Angela Bensend (USA); Geena Urango (USA)	Lane Carico (USA); Summer Ross (USA)	Kim DiCello (USA); Kendra VanZwieten (USA)
Seattle Open; Seattle, Washington; US$75,000; June 2–5	Lane Carico (USA); Summer Ross (USA); 21-17, 21-17 (0:51)	Jennifer Fopma (USA); Brittany Hochevar (USA)	Angela Bensend (USA); Geena Urango (USA)	Kim DiCello (USA); Kendra VanZwieten (USA)
New York City Open; New York City, New York; US$75,000; June 16–19	April Ross (USA); Kerri Walsh Jennings (USA); 21-16, 21-18 (0:55)	Lane Carico (USA); Summer Ross (USA)	Kelly Claes (USA); Sara Hughes (USA)	Jennifer Fopma (USA); Brittany Hochevar (USA)
San Francisco Open; San Francisco, California; US$75,000; June 23–26	April Ross (USA); Kerri Walsh Jennings (USA); 21-17, 21-13 (0:53)	Kelly Claes (USA); Sara Hughes (USA)	Lane Carico (USA); Summer Ross (USA)	Emily Day (USA); Brittany Hochevar (USA)
Manhattan Beach Open; Manhattan Beach, California; US$100,000; July 14–17	Emily Day (USA); Brittany Hochevar (USA); 21-16, 19-21, 19-17 (1:11)	Lane Carico (USA); Summer Ross (USA)	Kim DiCello (USA); Kendra VanZwieten (USA)	Lauren Fendrick (USA); Brooke Sweat (USA)
AVP Championships; Chicago, Illinois; US$100,000; September 1–4	Lauren Fendrick (USA); Brooke Sweat (USA); 14-21, 21-10, 19-17 (1:08)	Betsi Flint (USA); Kelley Larsen (USA)	Ali McColloch (USA); Geena Urango (USA)	Lane Carico (USA); Summer Ross (USA)

== Milestones and events ==
New Orleans Open

- Ryan Doherty became the tallest player to win an AVP tournament at 7 ft 1 in (2.16 m).
- Kendra VanZwieten became the shortest player (tied) to win an AVP tournament at 5 ft 6 in (1.68 m).

AVP Championships

- Two rule changes were tested at the AVP Championships: a "point freeze" at match point, wherein the scoring system changes from rally scoring (either team can score a point on every serve) to side-out scoring (only serving team can score a point) when either team reaches match point; "Let" serves, wherein the ball touches the net while crossing over into the opponent's court during service, are not allowed and the serve will be replayed.

== Statistics leaders ==
=== Men's statistical leaders ===
Team Wins
	Team	Tournaments
1	Jake Gibb (USA); Casey Patterson (USA)	3
2	Phil Dalhausser (USA); Nick Lucena (USA)	2
3	Billy Allen (USA); Theo Brunner (USA)	1
3	Ryan Doherty (USA); John Mayer (USA)	1

Team Points
	Team	Points
1	Taylor Crabb (USA); Trevor Crabb (USA)	4,080
2	Jake Gibb (USA); Casey Patterson (USA)	3,880
3	Billy Allen (USA); Theo Brunner (USA)	2,640
4	Phil Dalhausser (USA); Nick Lucena (USA)	2,340
5	Ryan Doherty (USA); John Mayer (USA)	2,280

Team Winnings
	Team	Winnings
1	Jake Gibb (USA); Casey Patterson (USA)	US$73,000
2	Taylor Crabb (USA); Trevor Crabb (USA)	US$61,000
3	Phil Dalhausser (USA); Nick Lucena (USA)	US$46,000
4	Billy Allen (USA); Theo Brunner (USA)	US$39,200
5	Ryan Doherty (USA); John Mayer (USA)	US$36,500

Aces
	Player	Aces
1	Jeremy Casebeer (USA)	48
2	Jake Gibb (USA)	44
2	Casey Patterson (USA)	44
4	John Mayer (USA)	40
5	Ryan Doherty (USA)	38

Blocks
	Player	Blocks
1	Theo Brunner (USA)	133
2	Jake Gibb (USA)	121
3	Ryan Doherty (USA)	108
4	Trevor Crabb (USA)	93
5	Stafford Slick (USA)	89

Digs
	Player	Digs
1	Taylor Crabb (USA)	480
2	John Mayer (USA)	369
3	Billy Allen (USA)	359
4	Casey Patterson (USA)	310
5	Ty Tramblie (USA)	301

Hitting Percentage
	Player	%
1	Phil Dalhausser (USA)	.579
2	Casey Patterson (USA)	.494
3	Ryan Doherty (USA)	.474
4	Jake Gibb (USA)	.458
4	Trevor Crabb (USA)	.458

=== Women's statistical leaders ===
Team Wins
	Team	Tournaments
1	April Ross (USA); Kerri Walsh Jennings (USA)	3
2	Emily Day (USA); Brittany Hochevar (USA)	2
2	Lauren Fendrick (USA); Brooke Sweat (USA)	1
2	Lane Carico (USA); Summer Ross (USA)	1
2	Kim DiCello (USA); Kendra VanZwieten (USA)	1

Team Points
	Team	Points
1	Lane Carico (USA); Summer Ross (USA)	3,650
2	Kim DiCello (USA); Kendra VanZwieten (USA)	3,120
3	Angela Bensend (USA); Geena Urango (USA)	2,940
4	April Ross (USA); Kerri Walsh Jennings (USA)	2,250
5	Betsi Flint (USA); Kelley Larsen (USA)	2,060

Team Winnings
	Team	Winnings
1	Lane Carico (USA); Summer Ross (USA)	US$62,500
2	Kim DiCello (USA); Kendra VanZwieten (USA)	US$45,700
3	April Ross (USA); Kerri Walsh Jennings (USA)	US$45,000
4	Angela Bensend (USA); Geena Urango (USA)	US$39,300
5	Betsi Flint (USA); Kelley Larsen (USA)	US$29,000

Aces
	Player	Aces
1	Geena Urango (USA)	74
2	April Ross (USA)	52
3	Emily Day (USA)	48
3	Lane Carico (USA)	48
5	Brittany Hochevar (USA)	43

Blocks
	Player	Blocks
1	Summer Ross (USA)	72
2	Kim DiCello (USA)	60
3	Lauren Fendrick (USA)	51
4	Shelia Shaw (USA)	49
5	Jennifer Fopma (USA)	46

Digs
	Player	Digs
1	Lane Carico (USA)	458
2	Kendra VanZwieten (USA)	397
3	Geena Urango (USA)	395
4	Brittany Hochevar (USA)	333
5	Emily Stockman (USA)	323

Hitting Percentage
	Player	%
1	Whitney Pavlik (USA)	.696
2	Kerri Walsh Jennings (USA)	.585
3	April Ross (USA)	.557
4	Kim DiCello (USA)	.482
5	Lauren Fendrick (USA)	.478

== Points distribution ==
Finish	US$150,000 tournaments	US$200,000 tournaments
1	750	1050
2	640	896
3	540	756
5	450	630
7	370	518
9	300	420
13	240	336
15	210	294
17	190	266
19	170	238
21	150	210
25	120	168
-1	100	140
-2	82	114
-3	66	92
-4	52	72

== Awards ==
The season's top performers were chosen based on statistics, player votes and AVP national ranking points earned during the year.

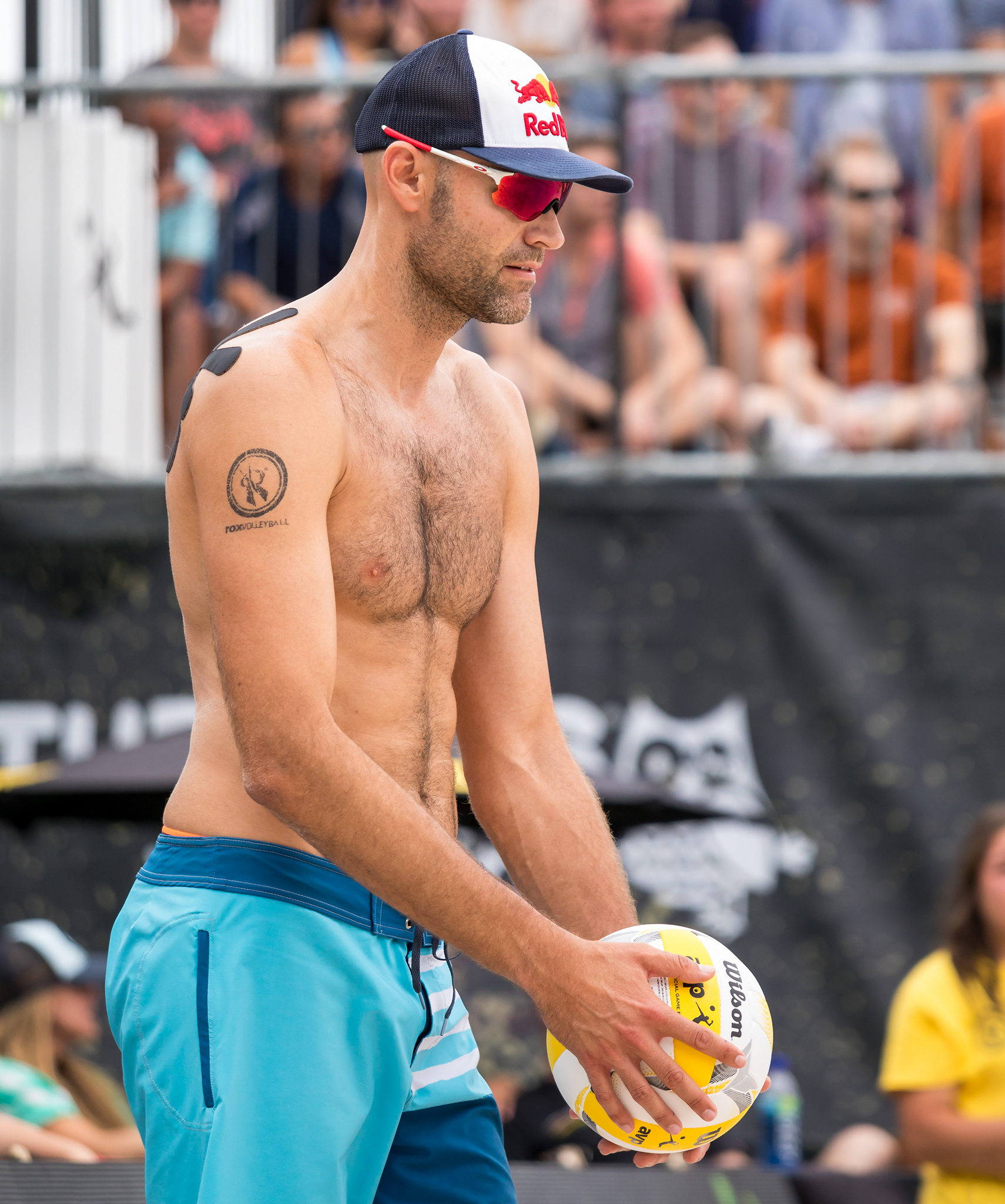
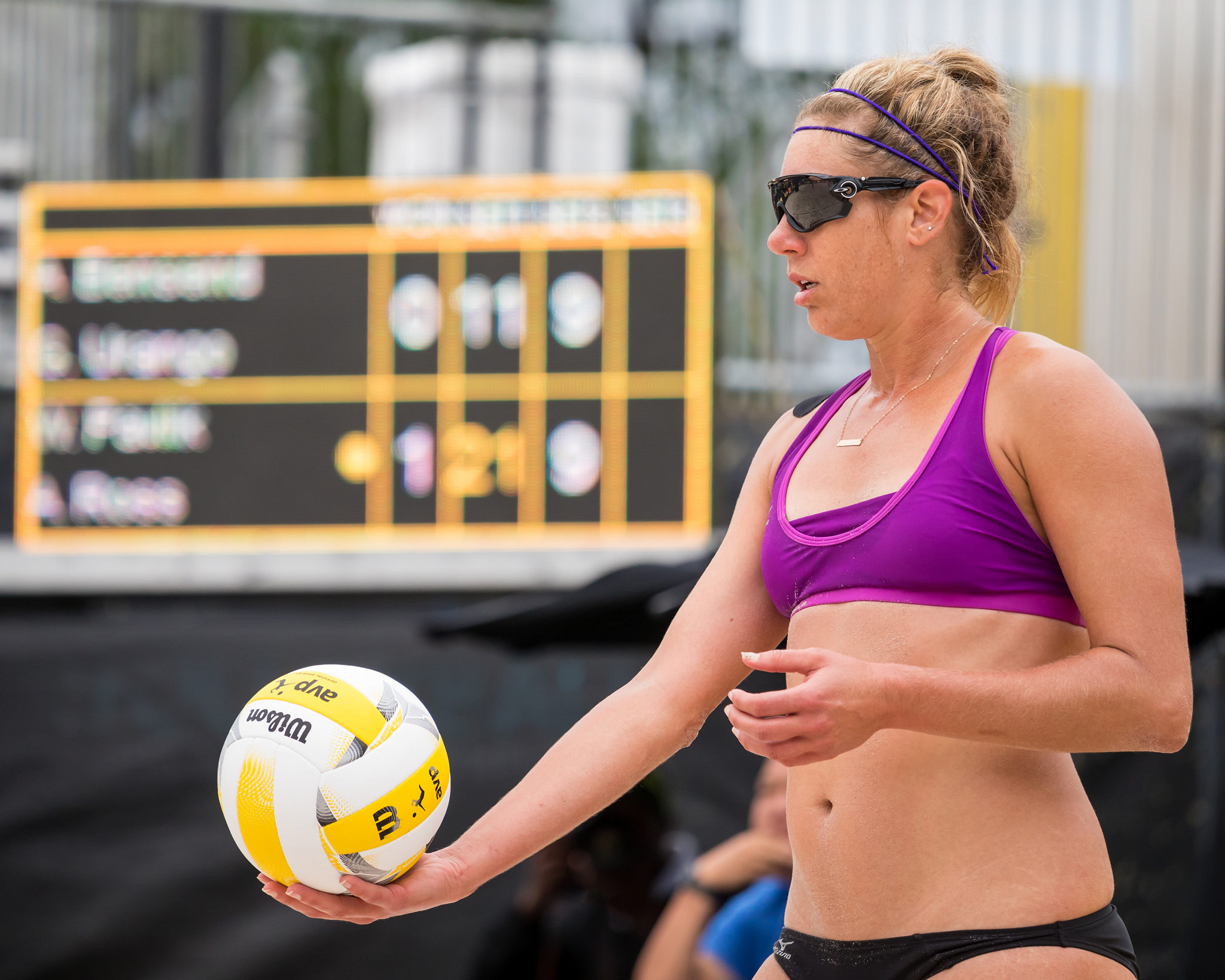
On the men's side, Phil Dalhausser was named Best Blocker and Best Offensive Player. On the women's side, April Ross was named Most Valuable Player, Best Server and Team of the Year (with Kerri Walsh Jennings).

Award	Men	Women
Best blocker	Phil Dalhausser (USA)	Lauren Fendrick (USA)
Best server	Jeremy Casebeer (USA)	April Ross (USA)
Best defender	Taylor Crabb (USA)	Brooke Sweat (USA)
Best Offensive Player	Phil Dalhausser (USA)	Whitney Pavlik (USA)
Most Improved Player	—	Geena Urango (USA)
Newcomer of the Year	Chase Frishman (USA)	Kelly Reeves (USA)
Most valuable player	—	April Ross (USA)
Team of the Year	Jake Gibb (USA); Casey Patterson (USA)	April Ross (USA); Kerri Walsh Jennings (USA)
