= 2013 AVP Pro Beach Volleyball Tour =

- League: Association of Volleyball Professionals
- Sport: Beach volleyball
- Duration: August 15 – October 20, 2013
- TV partner(s): NBC; NBCSN

Seasons
- ← 2012 2014 →

The 2013 AVP Pro Beach Volleyball Tour was a domestic professional beach volleyball circuit organized in the United States by the Association of Volleyball Professionals (AVP) for the 2013 beach volleyball season.

== Schedule ==
This is the complete schedule of events on the 2013 calendar, with team progression documented from the semifinals stage. All tournaments consisted of single-elimination qualifying rounds followed by a double-elimination main draw.

=== Men ===
Tournament	Champions	Runners-up	Semifinalist #1	Semifinalist #2
Salt Lake City Open; Salt Lake City, Utah; US$75,000; August 15–18	Phil Dalhausser (USA); Sean Rosenthal (USA); 21-12, 19-21, 15-10 (1:03)	Ryan Doherty (USA); Todd Rogers (USA)	Jake Gibb (USA); Casey Patterson (USA)	Theo Brunner (USA); Nick Lucena (USA)
Manhattan Beach Open; Manhattan Beach, California; US$100,000; August 23–25	Matt Fuerbringer (USA); Casey Jennings (USA); 21-18, 21-23, 15-12 (1:26)	Phil Dalhausser (USA); Sean Rosenthal (USA)	Ryan Doherty (USA); Todd Rogers (USA)	Jake Gibb (USA); Casey Patterson (USA)
Cincinnati Open; Cincinnati, Ohio; US$75,000; August 30 – September 2	Jake Gibb (USA); Casey Patterson (USA); 21-14, 22-20 (0:56)	Theo Brunner (USA); Nick Lucena (USA)	Tri Bourne (USA); John Hyden (USA)	Phil Dalhausser (USA); Sean Rosenthal (USA)
Atlantic City Open; Atlantic City, New Jersey; US$50,000; September 6–8	Jake Gibb (USA); Casey Patterson (USA); 21-19, 21-15 (0:41)	Phil Dalhausser (USA); Sean Rosenthal (USA)	Ryan Doherty (USA); Todd Rogers (USA)	Theo Brunner (USA); Nick Lucena (USA)
St. Petersburg Open; St. Petersburg, Florida; US$75,000; September 13–15	Jake Gibb (USA); Casey Patterson (USA); 22-20, 21-19 (0:49)	Theo Brunner (USA); Nick Lucena (USA)	Tri Bourne (USA); John Hyden (USA)	Phil Dalhausser (USA); Sean Rosenthal (USA)
Santa Barbara Open; Santa Barbara, California; US$75,000; September 26–29	Jake Gibb (USA); Casey Patterson (USA); 21-19, 21-19 (0:53)	Tri Bourne (USA); John Hyden (USA)	Adrian Carambula (ITA); Stafford Slick (USA)	Billy Allen (USA); Braidy Halverson (USA)
AVP Championships; Huntington Beach, California; US$100,000; October 17–20	Theo Brunner (USA); Nick Lucena (USA); 23-21, 7-21, 15-13 (1:03)	Tri Bourne (USA); John Hyden (USA)	Jake Gibb (USA); Casey Patterson (USA)	Brad Keenan (USA); John Mayer (USA)

=== Women ===
Tournament	Champions	Runners-up	Semifinalist #1	Semifinalist #2
Salt Lake City Open; Salt Lake City, Utah; US$75,000; August 15–18	Jennifer Kessy (USA); April Ross (USA); 20-22, 21-18, 15-13 (1:11)	Lauren Fendrick (USA); Brittany Hochevar (USA)	Christal Engle (USA); Tealle Hunkus (USA)	Jennifer Fopma (USA); Brooke Sweat (USA)
Manhattan Beach Open; Manhattan Beach, California; US$100,000; August 23–25	Whitney Pavlik (USA); Kerri Walsh Jennings (USA); 22-20, 21-17 (0:53)	Jennifer Fopma (USA); Brooke Sweat (USA)	Lauren Fendrick (USA); Brittany Hochevar (USA)	Jennifer Kessy (USA); April Ross (USA)
Cincinnati Open; Cincinnati, Ohio; US$75,000; August 30 – September 2	Emily Day (USA); Summer Ross (USA); 21-15, 21-11 (0:50)	Whitney Pavlik (USA); Kerri Walsh Jennings (USA)	Jennifer Kessy (USA); April Ross (USA)	Angie Akers (USA); Priscilla Lima (USA)
Atlantic City Open; Atlantic City, New Jersey; US$50,000; September 6–8	Jennifer Kessy (USA); April Ross (USA); 23-25, 21-16, 15-13 (1:04)	Emily Day (USA); Summer Ross (USA)	Whitney Pavlik (USA); Kerri Walsh Jennings (USA)	Lauren Fendrick (USA); Brittany Hochevar (USA)
St. Petersburg Open; St. Petersburg, Florida; US$75,000; September 13–15	No winner	Jennifer Kessy (USA); April Ross (USA)	Emily Day (USA); Summer Ross (USA)	Whitney Pavlik (USA); Kerri Walsh Jennings (USA)
Santa Barbara Open; Santa Barbara, California; US$75,000; September 26–29	April Ross (USA); Kerri Walsh Jennings (USA); 21-18, 21-10 (0:34)	Jennifer Fopma (USA); Brooke Sweat (USA)	Lauren Fendrick (USA); Brittany Hochevar (USA)	Emily Day (USA); Summer Ross (USA)
AVP Championships; Huntington Beach, California; US$100,000; October 17–20	Jennifer Fopma (USA); Brooke Sweat (USA); 21-9, 15-21, 15-9 (0:58)	Lauren Fendrick (USA); Brittany Hochevar (USA)	April Ross (USA); Kerri Walsh Jennings (USA)	Emily Day (USA); Summer Ross (USA)

== Milestones and events ==
Miscellaneous

- The 2013 season was the AVP's first full season under new CEO Donald Sun.

== Points distribution ==
Finish	US$150,000 tournaments	US$200,000 tournaments
1	750	1050
2	640	896
3	540	756
5	450	630
7	370	518
9	300	420
13	240	336
15	210	294
17	190	266
19	170	238
21	150	210
25	120	168
-1	100	140
-2	82	114
-3	66	92
-4	52	72

== Awards ==
The 2013 AVP year-end award winners were announced on November 19. The season's top performers were chosen based on statistics, player votes and AVP national ranking points earned during the year.

Award	Men	Women
Best blocker	Theo Brunner (USA)	Jennifer Fopma (USA)
Best server	Andrei Belov (RUS)	April Ross (USA)
Best Defensive Player	John Hyden (USA)	Brooke Sweat (USA)
Best Offensive Player	Casey Patterson (USA)	April Ross (USA)
Most Improved Player	Tri Bourne (USA)	Emily Day (USA)
Newcomer of the Year	Tri Bourne (USA)	Lane Carico (USA)
Most valuable player	Jake Gibb (USA)	April Ross (USA)
Team of the Year	Jake Gibb (USA); Casey Patterson (USA)	Jennifer Kessy (USA); April Ross (USA)
