= 2017 AVP Pro Beach Volleyball Tour =

- League: Association of Volleyball Professionals
- Sport: Beach volleyball
- Duration: May 4 – September 3, 2017
- TV partner(s): NBC; NBCSN

Seasons
- ← 2016 2018 →

The 2017 AVP Pro Beach Volleyball Tour was a domestic professional beach volleyball circuit organized in the United States by the Association of Volleyball Professionals (AVP) for the 2017 beach volleyball season. The 2017 AVP Tour calendar comprises the "Gold Series" tournaments and "Open" tournaments.

== Schedule ==
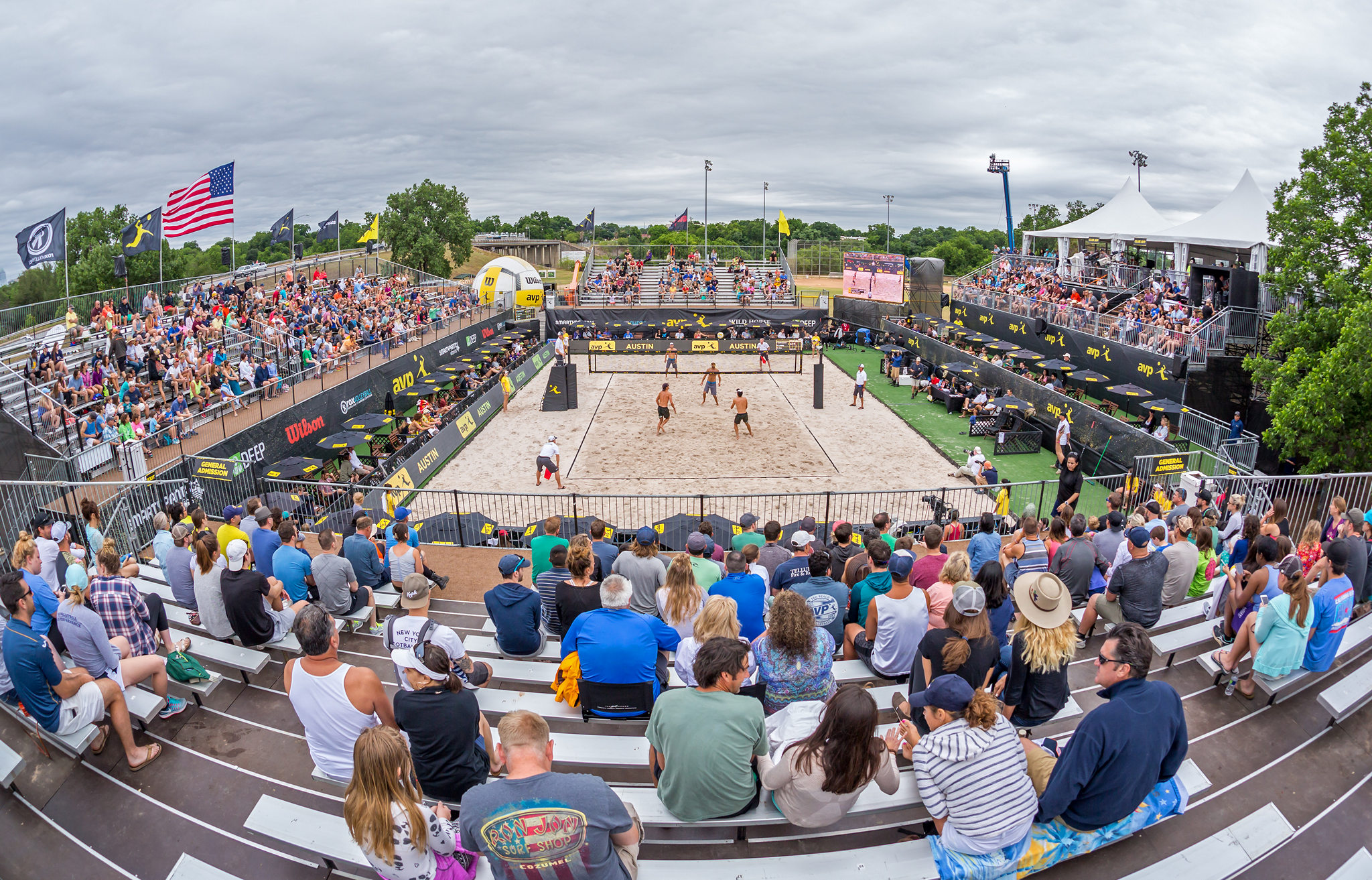
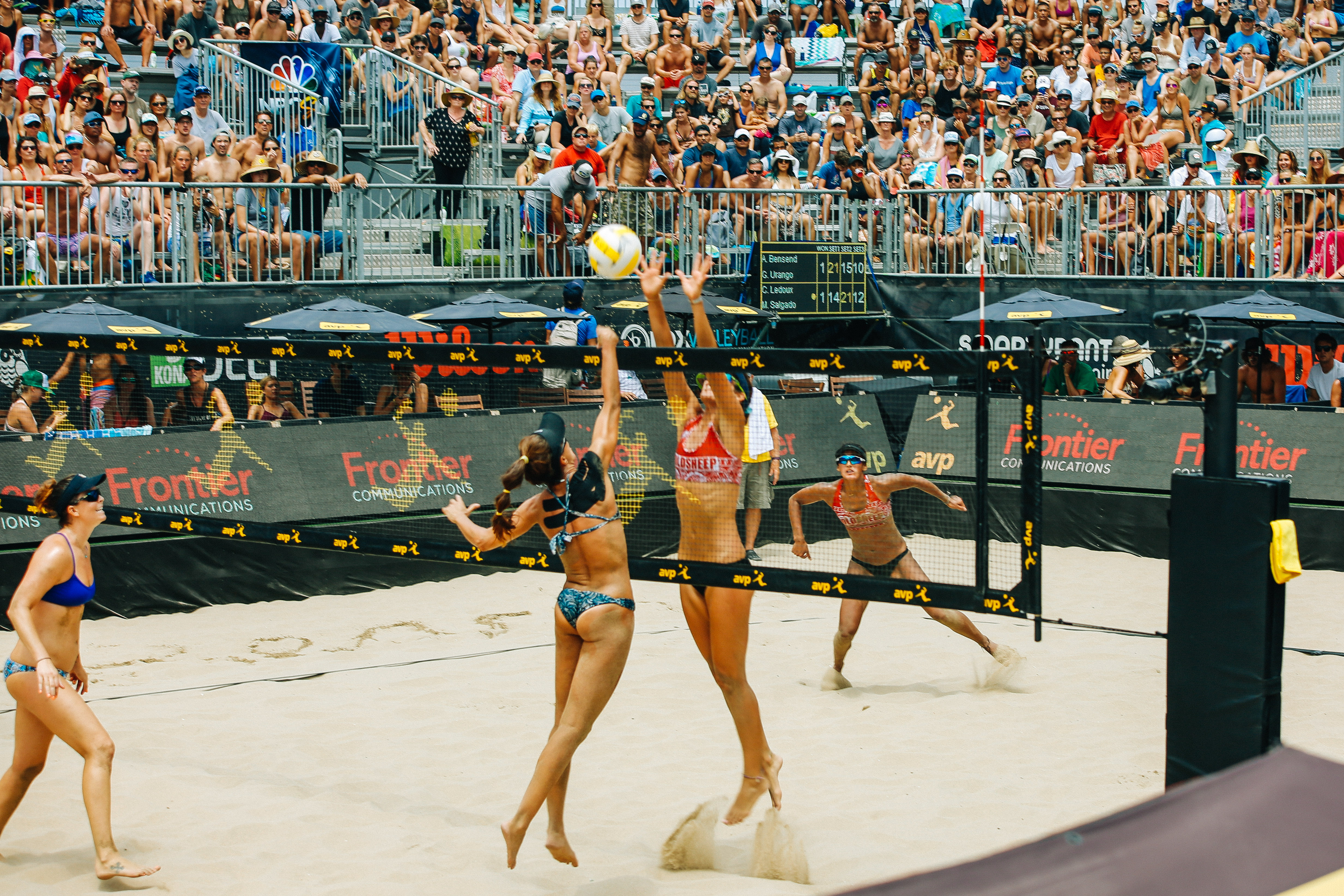
A men's match at the 2017 Austin Open (left) and a women's match at the 2017 Hermosa Beach Open

This is the complete schedule of events on the 2017 calendar, with team progression documented from the semifinals stage. All tournaments consisted of single-elimination qualifying rounds followed by a double-elimination main draw.

Key

Gold Series

=== Men ===
Tournament	Champions	Runners-up	Semifinalist #1	Semifinalist #2
Huntington Beach Open; Huntington Beach, California; US$75,000; May 4–7	Phil Dalhausser (USA); Nick Lucena (USA); 21-16, 21-17 (0:51)	Ryan Doherty (USA); John Hyden (USA)	Theo Brunner (USA); Casey Patterson (USA)	Taylor Crabb (USA); Jake Gibb (USA)
Austin Open; Austin, Texas; US$75,000; May 18–21	Phil Dalhausser (USA); Nick Lucena (USA); 21-12, 21-19 (0:52)	Trevor Crabb (USA); Sean Rosenthal (USA)	Billy Allen (USA); Stafford Slick (USA)	Jeremy Casebeer (USA); John Mayer (USA)
New York City Open; New York City, New York; Gold Series; US$87,500; June 8–11	Taylor Crabb (USA); Jake Gibb (USA); 21-16, 25-23 (0:53)	Billy Allen (USA); Stafford Slick (USA)	Ricardo Santos (BRA); Chaim Schalk (CAN)	Trevor Crabb (USA); Sean Rosenthal (USA)
Seattle Open; Seattle, Washington; US$75,000; June 22–25	Billy Allen (USA); Stafford Slick (USA); 21-13, 13-21, 15-11 (1:07)	Trevor Crabb (USA); Sean Rosenthal (USA)	Taylor Crabb (USA); Jake Gibb (USA)	Jeremy Casebeer (USA); John Mayer (USA)
San Francisco Open; San Francisco, California; US$75,000; July 6–9	Ty Loomis (USA); Maddison McKibbin (USA); 24-22, 21-19 (1:03)	Billy Allen (USA); Stafford Slick (USA)	Reid Priddy (USA); Ricardo Santos (BRA)	Ed Ratledge (USA); Eric Zaun (USA)
Hermosa Beach Open; Hermosa Beach, California; US$79,000; July 20–23	Taylor Crabb (USA); Jake Gibb (USA); 21-16, 17-21, 15-11 (1:13)	Trevor Crabb (USA); Sean Rosenthal (USA)	Avery Drost (USA); Chase Frishman (USA)	Piotr Marciniak (POL); Roberto Rodríguez (PUR)
Manhattan Beach Open; Manhattan Beach, California; Gold Series; US$112,500; August 17–20	Phil Dalhausser (USA); Nick Lucena (USA); 23-25, 21-18, 15-10 (1:15)	Trevor Crabb (USA); Sean Rosenthal (USA)	Theo Brunner (USA); Casey Patterson (USA)	Reid Priddy (USA); Ricardo Santos (BRA)
Championships; Chicago, Illinois; Gold Series; US$112,500; August 31 – September 3	Ryan Doherty (USA); John Hyden (USA); 21-19, 21-19 (0:49)	Phil Dalhausser (USA); Nick Lucena (USA)	Jeremy Casebeer (USA); John Mayer (USA)	Billy Allen (USA); Stafford Slick (USA)

=== Women ===
Tournament	Champions	Runners-up	Semifinalist #1	Semifinalist #2
Huntington Beach Open; Huntington Beach, California; US$75,000; May 4–7	Emily Day (USA); Brittany Hochevar (USA); 21-13, 21-19 (0:36)	Betsi Flint (USA); Kelley Larsen (USA)	Whitney Pavlik (USA); April Ross (USA)	Lane Carico (USA); Lauren Fendrick (USA)
Austin Open; Austin, Texas; US$75,000; May 18–21	Whitney Pavlik (USA); April Ross (USA); 14-21, 21-16, 15-11 (1:00)	Kim DiCello (USA); Emily Stockman (USA)	Angela Bensend (USA); Geena Urango (USA)	Amanda Dowdy (USA); Irene Pollock (USA)
New York City Open; New York City, New York; Gold Series; US$87,500; June 8–11	Lauren Fendrick (USA); April Ross (USA); 24-22, 21-15 (0:46)	Summer Ross (USA); Brooke Sweat (USA)	Emily Day (USA); Brittany Hochevar (USA)	Kim DiCello (USA); Emily Stockman (USA)
Seattle Open; Seattle, Washington; US$75,000; June 22–25	Summer Ross (USA); Brooke Sweat (USA); 21-17, 24-22 (0:48)	Betsi Flint (USA); Kelley Larsen (USA)	Skylar Caputo (USA); Sarah Pavan (CAN)	Jennifer Fopma (USA); Kelly Reeves (USA)
San Francisco Open; San Francisco, California; US$75,000; July 6–9	Betsi Flint (USA); Kelley Larsen (USA); 21-13, 21-8 (0:39)	Lane Carico (USA); Alix Klineman (USA)	Jennifer Fopma (USA); Kelly Reeves (USA)	Angela Bensend (USA); Geena Urango (USA)
Hermosa Beach Open; Hermosa Beach, California; US$79,000; July 20–23	Emily Day (USA); Brittany Hochevar (USA); 21-17, 21-13 (0:45)	Angela Bensend (USA); Geena Urango (USA)	Lane Carico (USA); Alix Klineman (USA)	Caitlin Ledoux (USA); Maria Clara Salgado (BRA)
Manhattan Beach Open; Manhattan Beach, California; Gold Series; US$112,500; August 17–20	Emily Day (USA); Brittany Hochevar (USA); 21-18, 21-18 (0:55)	Nicole Branagh (USA); Brandie Wilkerson (CAN)	Lauren Fendrick (USA); April Ross (USA)	Kelly Claes (USA); Sara Hughes (USA)
Championships; Chicago, Illinois; Gold Series; US$112,500; August 31 – September 3	Kelly Claes (USA); Sara Hughes (USA); 21-17, 21-18 (0:45)	Summer Ross (USA); Brooke Sweat (USA)	Emily Day (USA); Brittany Hochevar (USA)	Lauren Fendrick (USA); April Ross (USA)

== Rule changes ==
Prior to the 2017 season, the AVP adopted two rule changes:

- A "point freeze" at match point, wherein the scoring system changes from rally scoring (either team can score a point on every serve) to side-out scoring (only serving team can score a point) when either team reaches match point.
- "Let" serves, wherein the ball touches the net while crossing over into the opponent's court during service, are not allowed during "point freezes" and the serve will be replayed.

== Milestones and events ==
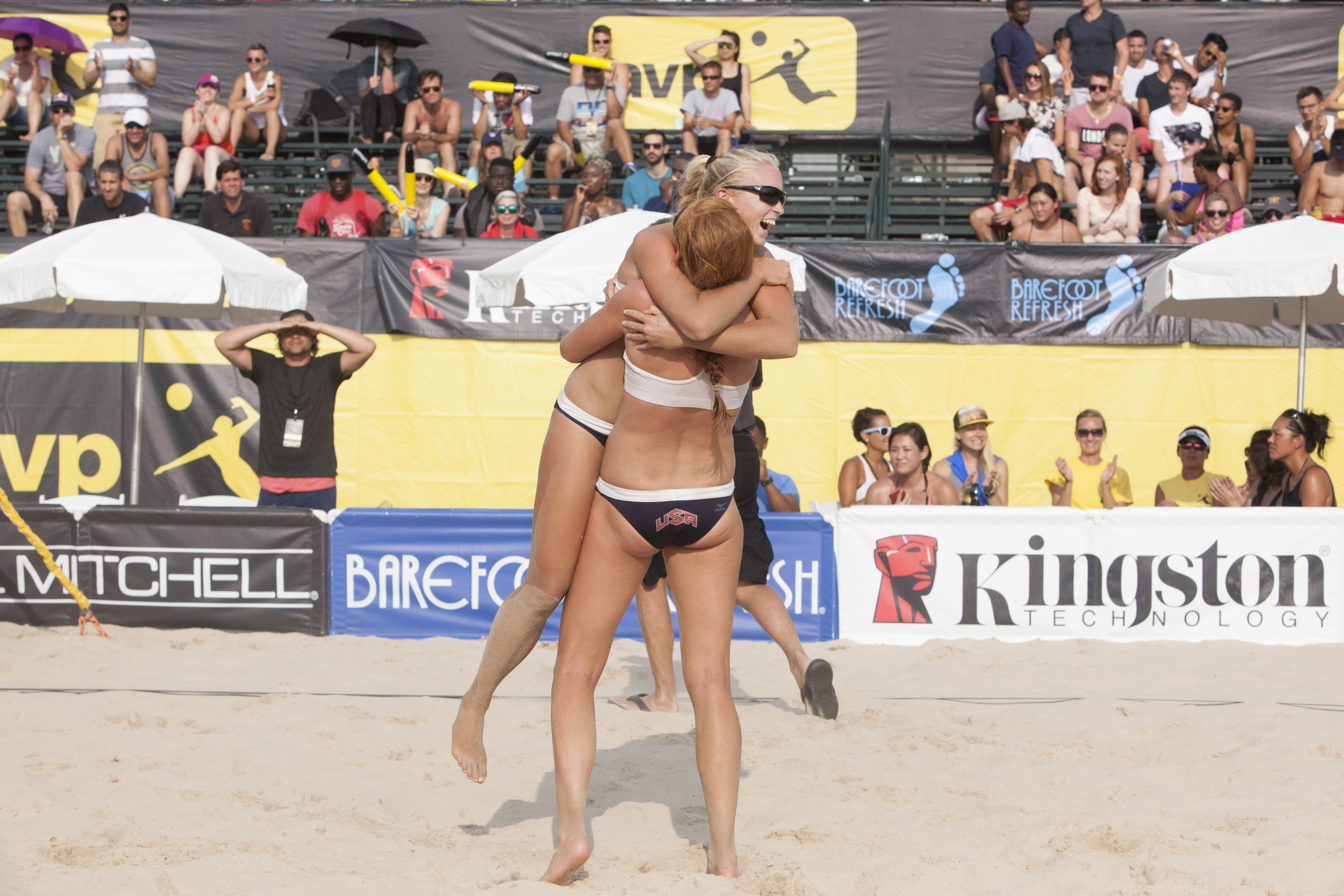
Sara Hughes and Kelly Claes became the youngest duo to win an AVP tournament.

Huntington Beach Open

- Phil Dalhausser won his 50th AVP tournament.

Hermosa Beach Open

- The 2017 season marked the return of the Hermosa Beach Open tournament, last held in 2010.
- Brothers Marcus and Miles Partain became the youngest pair (combined age) to get into the main draw of an AVP tournament at 17- and 15-years old respectively, after winning all three of their qualifying matches.

Chicago Championships

- Sara Hughes and Kelly Claes became the youngest pair (combined age) to win an AVP tournament at 22- and 21-years old respectively.
- John Hyden became the oldest player to win an AVP tournament at 44 years and 9 months old.

Miscellaneous

- NBC Sports announced that all eight AVP tournaments would be broadcast on either NBC or NBCSN.
- AVP required all players competing on the 2017 tour to sign a four-year exclusivity contract which forbids main draw players from playing in non-AVP events unless permission is given by the tour.

== Points distribution ==
Finish	US$150,000 tournaments	US$175,000 tournaments	US$200,000 tournaments	US$225,000 tournaments
1	750	900	1050	1200
2	640	768	896	1024
3	540	648	756	864
5	450	540	630	720
7	370	444	518	592
9	300	360	420	480
13	240	288	336	384
15	210	252	294	336
17	190	228	266	304
19	170	204	238	272
21	150	180	210	240
25	120	144	168	192
-1	100	120	140	160
-2	82	98	114	130
-3	66	78	92	106
-4	52	62	72	82

== Awards ==
The 2017 AVP Awards Banquet was held on November 4 in Newport Beach, California. The season's top performers were chosen based on statistics, player votes and AVP national ranking points earned during the year.

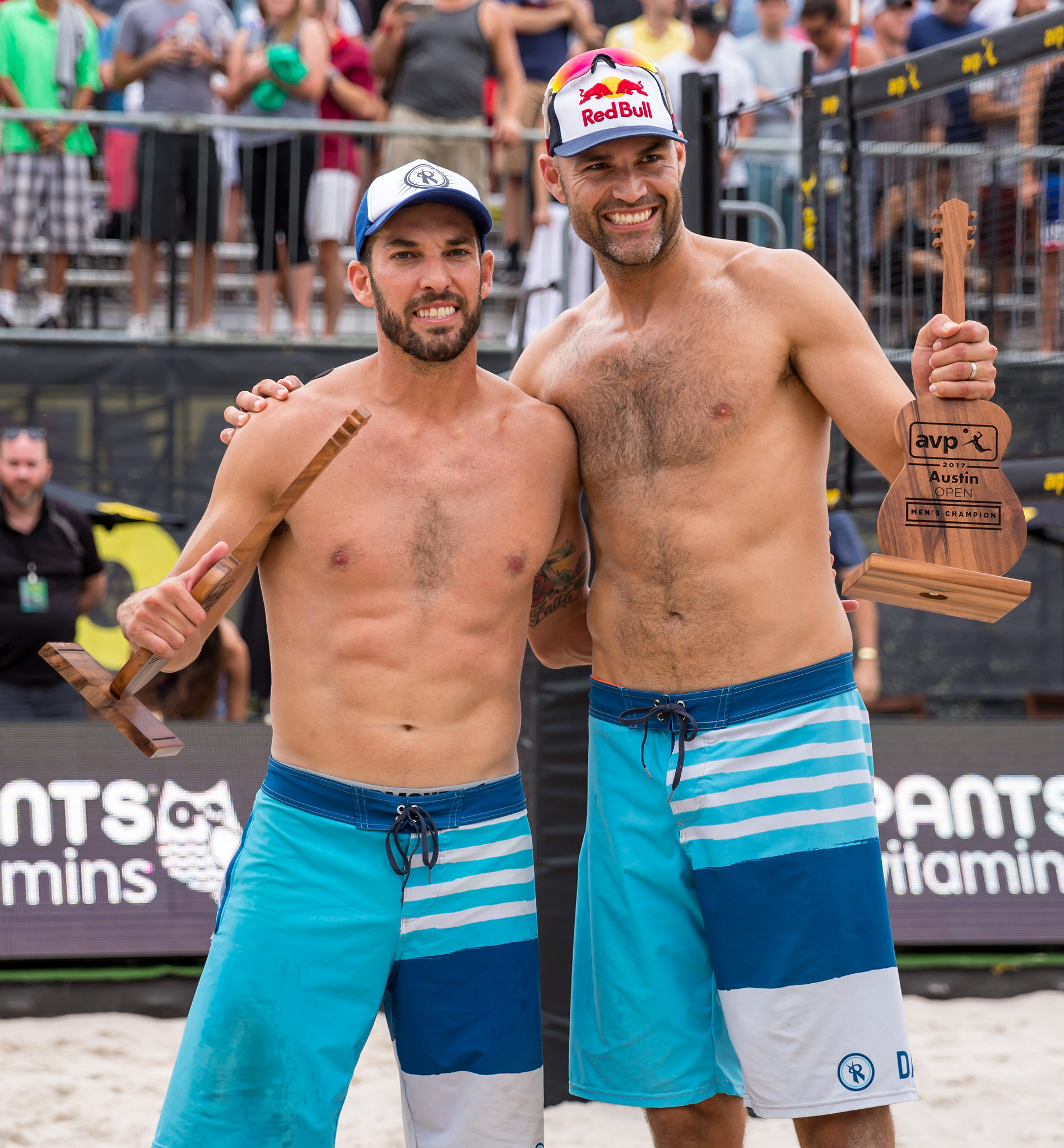
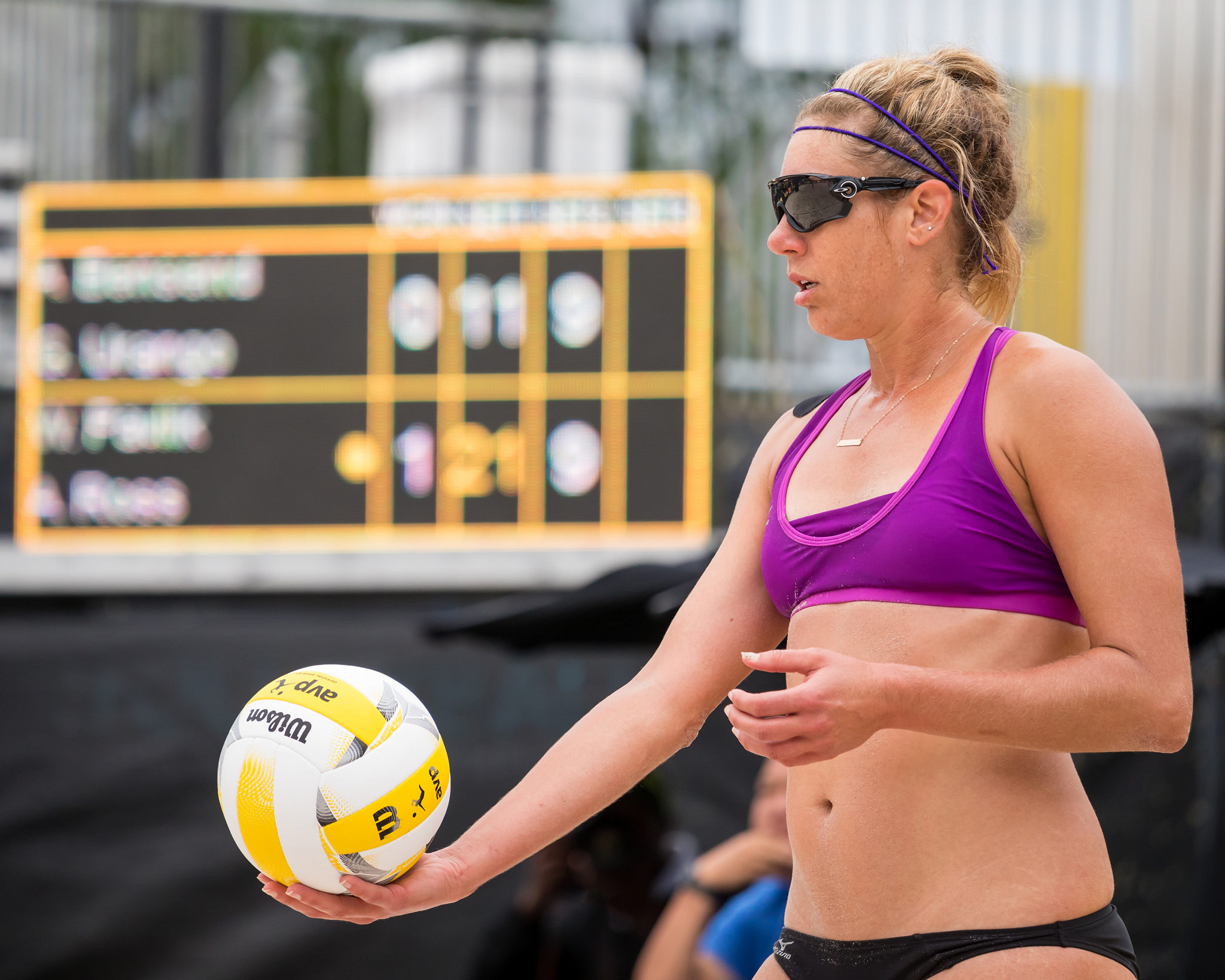
On the men's side, Nick Lucena and Phil Dalhausser were named Team of the Year. Dalhausser was also named Most Valuable Player, Best Blocker, Best Server and Best Offensive Player. On the women's side, April Ross was named Most Valuable Player, Best Server and Best Offensive Player.

Award	Men	Women
Best blocker	Phil Dalhausser (USA)	Lauren Fendrick (USA)
Best server	Phil Dalhausser (USA)	April Ross (USA)
Best defender	Taylor Crabb (USA)	Brooke Sweat (USA)
Best Offensive Player	Phil Dalhausser (USA)	April Ross (USA)
Most Improved Player	Stafford Slick (USA)	Caitlin Ledoux (USA)
Newcomer of the Year	Ricardo Santos (BRA)	Maria Clara Salgado (BRA)
Most valuable player	Phil Dalhausser (USA)	April Ross (USA)
Rookie of the Year	Eric Zaun (USA)	Alix Klineman (USA)
Team of the Year	Phil Dalhausser (USA); Nick Lucena (USA)	Emily Day (USA); Brittany Hochevar (USA)
