= 2015 AVP Pro Beach Volleyball Tour =

- League: Association of Volleyball Professionals
- Sport: Beach volleyball
- Duration: May 21 – September 13, 2015
- TV partner(s): NBC; NBCSN; Universal Sports

Seasons
- ← 2014 2016 →

The 2015 AVP Pro Beach Volleyball Tour was a domestic professional beach volleyball circuit organized in the United States by the Association of Volleyball Professionals (AVP) for the 2015 beach volleyball season.

== Schedule ==
This is the complete schedule of events on the 2015 calendar, with team progression documented from the semifinals stage. All tournaments consisted of single-elimination qualifying rounds followed by a double-elimination main draw.

=== Men ===
Tournament	Champions	Runners-up	Semifinalist #1	Semifinalist #2
New Orleans Open; New Orleans, Louisiana; US$75,000; May 21–24	Jake Gibb (USA); Casey Patterson (USA); 23-21, 21-14 (0:38)	Phil Dalhausser (USA); Sean Rosenthal (USA)	Ryan Doherty (USA); John Mayer (USA)	Brian Bomgren (USA); Tim Bomgren (USA)
New York City Open; New York City, New York; US$75,000; July 16–19	Jake Gibb (USA); Casey Patterson (USA); 19-21, 21-15, 15-12 (1:11)	Ryan Doherty (USA); John Mayer (USA)	Trevor Crabb (USA); Ty Tramblie (USA)	Avery Drost (USA); Billy Kolinske (USA)
Seattle Open; Seattle, Washington; US$75,000; August 6–9	Ryan Doherty (USA); John Mayer (USA); 20-22, 21-17, 15-13 (1:16)	Phil Dalhausser (USA); Sean Rosenthal (USA)	Tri Bourne (USA); John Hyden (USA)	Jake Gibb (USA); Casey Patterson (USA)
Manhattan Beach Open; Manhattan Beach, California; US$100,000; August 13–16	Phil Dalhausser (USA); Nick Lucena (USA); 21-19, 21-17 (0:57)	Tri Bourne (USA); John Hyden (USA)	Ryan Doherty (USA); John Mayer (USA)	Taylor Crabb (USA); Trevor Crabb (USA)
Chicago Open; Chicago, Illinois; US$75,000; August 27–30	Brad Kennan (USA); Ty Tramblie (USA); 21-19, 22-20 (0:54)	Ryan Doherty (USA); John Mayer (USA)	Casey Jennings (USA); Billy Kolinske (USA)	Todd Rogers (USA); Stafford Slick (USA)
Cincinnati Open; Mason, Ohio; US$75,000; September 3–6	Tri Bourne (USA); John Hyden (USA); 21-15, 21-18 (0:55)	Jake Gibb (USA); Casey Patterson (USA)	Phil Dalhausser (USA); Nick Lucena (USA)	Ty Loomis (USA); Marty Lorenz (USA)
AVP Championships; Huntington Beach, California; US$100,000; September 10–13	Tri Bourne (USA); John Hyden (USA); 21-17, 23-25, 15-13 (1:10)	Ryan Doherty (USA); John Mayer (USA)	Taylor Crabb (USA); Trevor Crabb (USA)	Jake Gibb (USA); Casey Patterson (USA)

=== Women ===
Tournament	Champions	Runners-up	Semifinalist #1	Semifinalist #2
New Orleans Open; New Orleans, Louisiana; US$75,000; May 21–24	April Ross (USA); Kerri Walsh Jennings (USA); 21-16, 22-20 (1:01)	Emily Day (USA); Jennifer Kessy (USA)	Angela Bensend (USA); Geena Urango (USA)	Kendra VanZwieten (USA); Megan Wallin-Brockway (USA)
New York City Open; New York City, New York; US$75,000; July 16–19	Emily Day (USA); Jennifer Kessy (USA); 24-22, 19-21, 23-21 (1:20)	Nicole Branagh (USA); Jenny Kropp (USA)	Kim DiCello (USA); Kendra VanZwieten (USA)	Kelly Claes (USA); Sara Hughes (USA)
Seattle Open; Seattle, Washington; US$75,000; August 6–9	Jennifer Fopma (USA); April Ross (USA); 21-18, 15-21, 15-13 (1:00)	Lane Carico (USA); Summer Ross (USA)	Kim DiCello (USA); Kendra VanZwieten (USA)	Brittany Hochevar (USA); Misty May-Treanor (USA)
Manhattan Beach Open; Manhattan Beach, California; US$100,000; August 13–16	Jennifer Fopma (USA); April Ross (USA); 21-15, 26-24 (0:56)	Nicole Branagh (USA); Jenny Kropp (USA)	Emily Day (USA); Jennifer Kessy (USA)	Lane Carico (USA); Summer Ross (USA)
Chicago Open; Chicago, Illinois; US$75,000; August 27–30	Nicole Branagh (USA); Jenny Kropp (USA); 21-16, 21-19 (0:45)	Kim DiCello (USA); Kendra VanZwieten (USA)	Amanda Dowdy (USA); Heather McGuire (USA)	Lane Carico (USA); Summer Ross (USA)
Cincinnati Open; Mason, Ohio; US$75,000; September 3–6	Betsi Flint (USA); Kelley Larsen (USA); 21-13, 18-21, 15-7 (1:02)	Angela Bensend (USA); Geena Urango (USA)	Ali McColloch (USA); Emily Stockman (USA)	Kim DiCello (USA); Kendra VanZwieten (USA)
AVP Championships; Huntington Beach, California; US$100,000; September 10–13	Lauren Fendrick (USA); April Ross (USA); 21-19, 23-21 (1:03)	Nicole Branagh (USA); Jenny Kropp (USA)	Emily Day (USA); Jennifer Kessy (USA)	Brittany Hochevar (USA); Misty May-Treanor (USA)

== Milestones and events ==
Seattle Open

- Misty May-Treanor competed with Brittany Hochevar, marking May-Treanor's first return to competition since her retirement after winning gold at the 2012 Summer Olympics with Kerri Walsh Jennings.

Miscellaneous

- AVP and NBC Sports Group signed an agreement for NBC Sports to air 17.5 hours of AVP tournaments, 10 hours on NBC and 7.5 hours on NBCSN, as well as livestreaming on NBC Sports Live Extra.
- April Ross became the first player to win four AVP tournaments with three different partners, after her regular partner Kerri Walsh Jennings suffered a shoulder injury that kept her from playing for most of the season.

== Statistics leaders ==
=== Men's statistical leaders ===
Team Wins
	Team	Tournaments
1	Tri Bourne (USA); John Hyden (USA)	2
1	Jake Gibb (USA); Casey Patterson (USA)	2
3	Phil Dalhausser (USA); Nick Lucena (USA)	1
3	Brad Keenan (USA); Ty Tramblie (USA)	1
3	Ryan Doherty (USA); John Mayer (USA)	1

Team Points
	Team	Points
1	Ryan Doherty (USA); John Mayer (USA)	4,200
2	Jake Gibb (USA); Casey Patterson (USA)	3,670
3	Tri Bourne (USA); John Hyden (USA)	2,680
4	Todd Rogers (USA); Stafford Slick (USA)	2,570
5	Casey Jennings (USA); Billy Kolinske (USA)	2,480

Team Winnings
	Team	Winnings
1	Ryan Doherty (USA); John Mayer (USA)	US$68,700
2	Jake Gibb (USA); Casey Patterson (USA)	US$62,300
3	Tri Bourne (USA); John Hyden (USA)	US$62,000
4	Phil Dalhausser (USA); Nick Lucena (USA)	US$37,000
5	Casey Jennings (USA); Billy Kolinske (USA)	US$29,700

Aces
	Player	Aces
1	Robbie Page (USA)	66
2	Russ Marchewka (USA)	56
3	John Mayer (USA)	43
3	Casey Patterson (USA)	43
3	Ryan Doherty (USA)	43

Blocks
	Player	Blocks
1	Ryan Doherty (USA)	131
1	Billy Kolinske (USA)	131
3	Jake Gibb (USA)	125
4	Robbie Page (USA)	100
5	Tim Bomgren (USA)	92

Digs
	Player	Digs
1	John Mayer (USA)	387
2	Casey Jennings (USA)	344
3	Billy Allen (USA)	317
4	Taylor Crabb (USA)	313
5	Brian Bomgren (USA)	283

Hitting Percentage
	Player	%
1	Phil Dalhausser (USA)	.517
2	Ryan Doherty (USA)	.504
3	Tri Bourne (USA)	.476
4	Trevor Crabb (USA)	.467
4	Casey Patterson (USA)	.453

=== Women's statistical leaders ===
Team Wins
	Team	Tournaments
1	April Ross (USA); Jennifer Fopma (USA)	2
2	April Ross (USA); Lauren Fendrick (USA)	1
2	Nicole Branagh (USA); Jenny Kropp (USA)	1
2	April Ross (USA); Kerri Walsh Jennings (USA)	1
2	Emily Day (USA); Jennifer Kessy (USA)	1
2	Kelley Larsen (USA); Betsi Flint (USA)	1

Team Points
	Team	Points
1	Nicole Branagh (USA); Jenny Kropp (USA)	3,570
2	Emily Day (USA); Jennifer Kessy (USA)	3,220
3	Angela Bensend (USA); Geena Urango (USA)	2,900
4	Ali McColloch (USA); Emily Stockman (USA)	2,730
5	Kim DiCello (USA); Kendra VanZwieten (USA)	2,710

Team Winnings
	Team	Winnings
1	Nicole Branagh (USA); Jenny Kropp (USA)	US$63,400
2	Emily Day (USA); Jennifer Kessy (USA)	US$50,500
3	April Ross (USA); Jennifer Fopma (USA)	US$40,200
4	Kim DiCello (USA); Kendra VanZwieten (USA)	US$37,000
5	Angela Bensend (USA); Geena Urango (USA)	US$35,050

Aces
	Player	Aces
1	April Ross (USA)	76
2	Nicole Branagh (USA)	68
2	Geena Urango (USA)	68
4	Jennifer Kessy (USA)	60
5	Betsi Flint (USA)	53

Blocks
	Player	Blocks
1	Jenny Kropp (USA)	110
2	Kim DiCello (USA)	71
3	Angela Bensend (USA)	62
4	Ali McColloch (USA)	57
5	Shelia Shaw (USA)	55

Digs
	Player	Digs
1	Kendra VanZwieten (USA)	484
2	Nicole Branagh (USA)	448
3	Emily Stockman (USA)	351
4	Geena Urango (USA)	333
5	April Ross (USA)	330

Hitting Percentage
	Player	%
1	April Ross (USA)	.563
2	Lauren Fendrick (USA)	.470
3	Kim DiCello (USA)	.464
4	Summer Ross (USA)	.459
5	Emily Day (USA)	.457

== Points distribution ==
Finish	US$150,000 tournaments	US$200,000 tournaments
1	750	1050
2	640	896
3	540	756
5	450	630
7	370	518
9	300	420
13	240	336
15	210	294
17	190	266
19	170	238
21	150	210
25	120	168
-1	100	140
-2	82	114
-3	66	92
-4	52	72

== Awards ==
The 2015 AVP Awards Banquet was held on October 28 in Newport Beach, California. The season's top performers were chosen based on statistics, player votes and AVP national ranking points earned during the year.

Award	Men	Women
Best blocker	Phil Dalhausser (USA)	Jenny Kropp (USA)
Best server	Robbie Page (USA)	April Ross (USA)
Best defender	John Mayer (USA)	Kendra VanZwieten (USA)
Best Offensive Player	Ryan Doherty (USA)	Nicole Branagh (USA)
Most Improved Player	Billy Kolinske (USA)	Kendra VanZwieten (USA)
Newcomer of the Year	Taylor Crabb (USA)	Betsi Flint (USA)
Most valuable player	John Mayer (USA)	April Ross (USA)
Team of the Year	Tri Bourne (USA); John Hyden (USA)	Jenny Kropp (USA); Nicole Branagh (USA)
