= Association of Volleyball Professionals =

Professional American volleyball league

- Sport: Beach volleyball
- Founded: 1983
- President: Heath Freeman
- Country: United States
- Broadcasters: CBS Sports; CW Sports
- Website: avp.com
- 2025 AVP Pro Beach Volleyball Tour

The Association of Volleyball Professionals (AVP) is the biggest and longest-running professional beach volleyball tour in the United States. Founded in 1983, the AVP is headquartered in Newport Beach, California. The AVP operates as a 3-tiered development system with AVPFirst, a youth program; AVPNext, a developmental circuit; and the AVP Pro Beach Volleyball Tour itself.

== History ==
=== 1983–1997: Origins and early history ===
The AVP was formed in 1983 as a players' union. Following a dispute with a private promoter at the 1984 World Championships in Redondo Beach, California, the AVP began organizing its own men's tour in 1984. The 1985 AVP tour included stops in eight U.S. states with a total prize money of US$275,000. The sport experienced significant growth in the 1980s and 1990s, and by 1993, the AVP tour had a total prize money of US$3.7 million with ten events that were broadcast on NBC Sports and attended by over 600,000 people. The AVP began organizing women's events in 1993, competing with the Women's Professional Volleyball Association (WPVA), the main women's tour that began in 1986.

The AVP had conflicts with the sport's international governing body, the Fédération Internationale de Volleyball (FIVB), in the 1980s and 1990s over regulations and sponsorship. This culminated in an initial boycott of FIVB Olympic qualification events by the top American players in the lead up to beach volleyball's Olympic debut at the 1996 Summer Olympics. The boycott ended in mid-1995 after an agreement between both parties was reached.

=== 1998–2010: Bankruptcies and restructuring ===
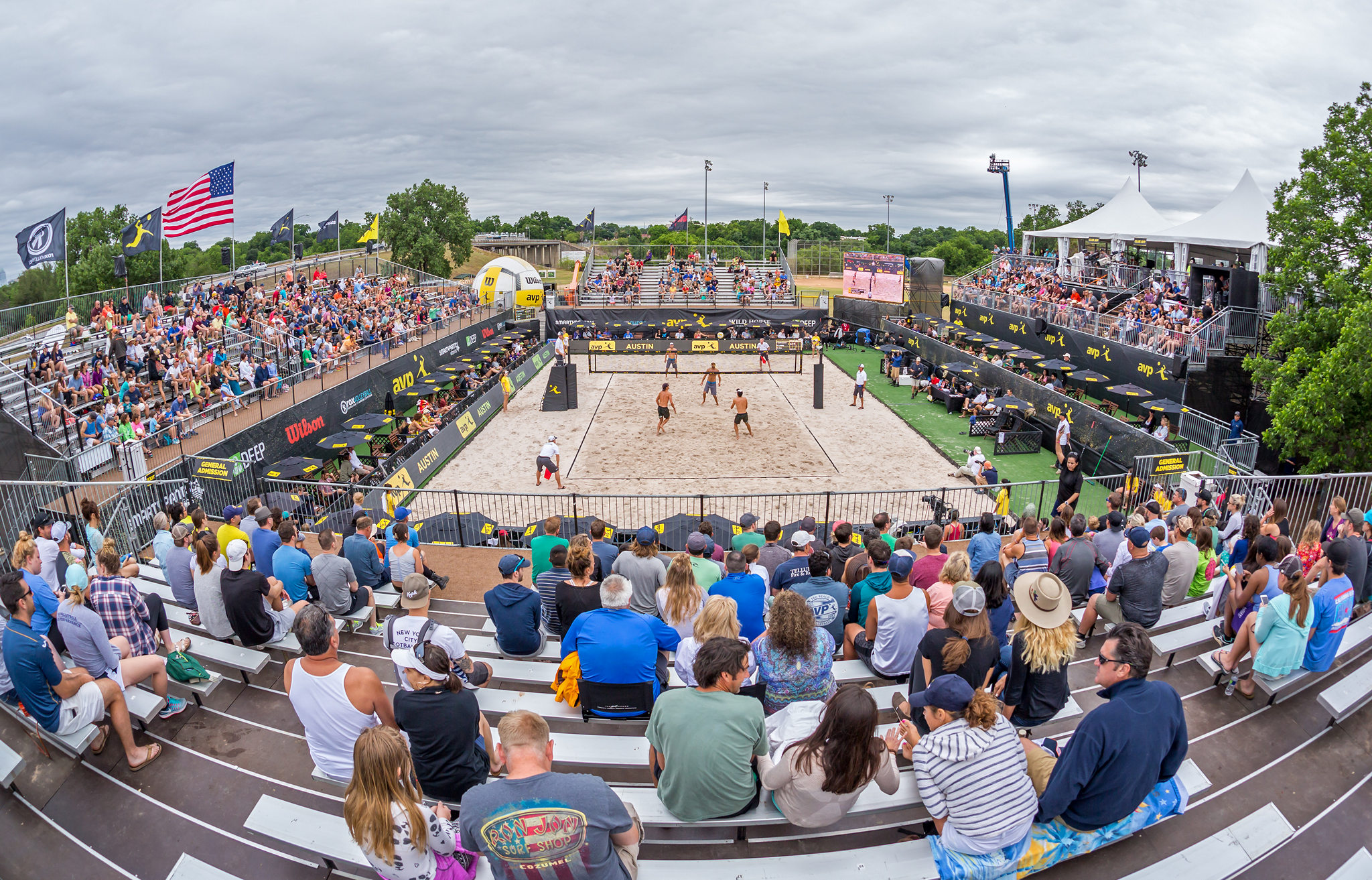
A men's match at the 2017 Austin Open

By 1997, sponsors started to withdraw due to the mounting financial problems and mismanagement in the AVP. In 1998, the AVP filed for bankruptcy and new management restructured the AVP from a players union to a for-profit privately owned company. The tour was bought out of bankruptcy the following year by Major League Volleyball and twelve events were held with a total prize money of US$1 million. In 2001, the tour was bought by Leonard Armato and his company Management Plus. The new tour combined the men's and women's professional tours. The tour also adopted the FIVB's smaller court size and rally scoring system, which upset many of the tour's players at the time.

In 2006, Crocs signed on as the title sponsor of the tour, which became known as the AVP Crocs Tour until its suspension in 2010. Other corporate sponsors for the tour included McDonald's, Nautica, Anheuser-Busch, Nature Valley and Xbox. By 2008, the AVP had an annual revenue of nearly US$25 million and were organizing as many as 31 events each year. However, the tour was hit badly by the 2008 financial crisis which saw it lose sponsors and revenue.

The AVP suspended its operations in August 2010, canceling the five remaining tournaments in the tour calendar and filing for bankruptcy once more. During the AVP's absence, two other domestic professional tours, the National Volleyball League (NVL) and the Jose Cuervo Pro Volleyball Beach Series, were formed.

=== 2011–present: Re-emergence ===
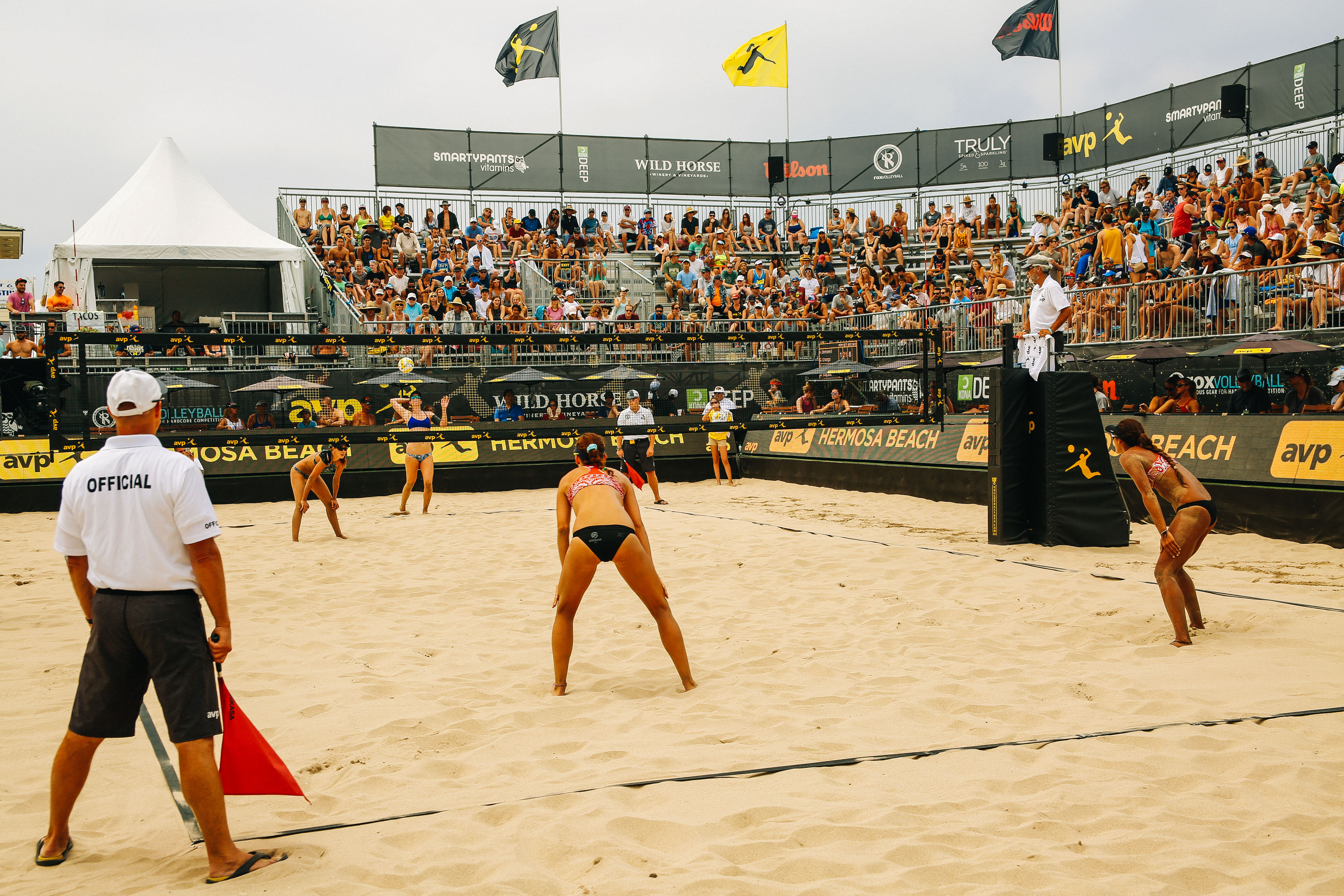
A women's match at the 2017 Hermosa Beach Open

The AVP was bought in December 2010 by DFA PVA II Partners, LLC, and a tournament was held in Huntington Beach, California in October 2011. In April 2012, the AVP was bought by Donald Sun and two tournaments, the Cincinnati Open and the 2012 AVP Championships, were held later that year. The first full AVP season under Sun began in 2013. Facing competition from the NVL, the AVP required players competing on the 2017 AVP Pro Beach Volleyball Tour to sign a four-year exclusivity contract.

Since its re-emergence in 2013, the AVP Pro Beach Volleyball Tour has once again established itself as the biggest professional beach volleyball tour in the United States, with most of the top American players competing on the tour. International players are allowed to play on the AVP tour as well if they have dual citizenship or permanent residency in the United States. Notable international players on the tour include Brazil's Ricardo Santos and Canada's Sarah Pavan.

On July 13, 2021, casino operator Bally's Corporation announced that it had acquired the AVP. The tour will leverage Sinclair Broadcast Group's Bally Sports regional sports networks as a distribution channel for AVP events.

In the fall of 2024, following a growth-capital and strategic investment from Next Generation Sports led by Heath Freeman, the Association of Volleyball Professionals (AVP) launched the AVP League, a new city-based competition format featuring eight franchises, each composed of one men’s and one women’s pair. Teams competed during a regular season for a combined League Cup title and concluded with separate League Championships events. The league’s matches were broadcast nationally on The CW Network and CBS Sports Network.

The 2025 season marked the league’s second year under this format. While the structure represented a significant change for professional beach volleyball in the United States, its long-term viability has been debated. Volleyball journalist Larry Hamel described the venture as a “flawed league concept,” noting that despite strong athletes and national exposure, the sustainability of the AVP’s city-franchise model remains uncertain. (Hamel, All Volleyball, 2025)

Bally’s Corporation had previously acquired the AVP in 2021. The subsequent investment by Next Generation Sports positioned the new ownership group as key to revitalizing the AVP brand by the introduction of the league.

== Rules ==
Since the 2017 season, there are two main differences between the AVP rules and standard beach volleyball rules. The first difference is that AVP matches have a "point freeze" at match point, wherein the scoring system changes from rally scoring (either team can score a point on every serve) to side-out scoring (only serving team can score a point) when either team reaches match point. This rule was introduced to allow for more comebacks. The second difference is that "let" serves, wherein the ball touches the net while crossing over into the opponent's court during service, are not allowed during "point freezes" and the serve will be replayed.

== Tournament categories ==
The current tournament structure was introduced in 2017. AVP tournaments are categorized as either a "Gold Series" or "Open" event. Gold Series tournaments award more prize money and AVP national ranking points. For the 2017 Tour, Open events had a prize purse of US$150,000–$158,000 while Gold Series events had a prize purse of US$175,000–$225,000.

== AVPNext and AVPFirst ==
AVPNext was started in 2014 as a developmental circuit, serving as a pipeline for future AVP Pro Beach Volleyball Tour players. AVPNext tournaments enable players to earn AVP national ranking points which are required for qualification and seeding in the Pro Tour events. The highest-ranked AVPNext teams from each region at the end of the season also receive direct entry into the Manhattan Beach Open. For the 2019 season, the AVPNext Gold events had a prize purse of US$20,000–25,000.

AVPFirst was launched in 2015 as a non-profit youth development program aimed at increasing youth participation in the sport through beach volleyball clinics and events. The inaugural AVPFirst Championships were held in Hermosa Beach, California in 2016 for boys and girls in the under-12, under-14, under-16 and under-18 age groups. Teams qualified through a series of qualifying events throughout the country.

== Television coverage ==
As of 2025, television coverage is shared between CBS Sports and CW Sports. The CW airs all Saturday events in primetime along with the Manhattan Beach Open. CBS Sports Network airs all other events, except for the AVP League Championship finals which airs on CBS.

== AVP Awards ==
The AVP Awards Banquet takes place at the end of each year, honoring the tour's top performers based on statistics, player votes and AVP national ranking points earned during the year. Players submit names for each award category, except for Rookie of the Year.

=== Men's award winners ===
Most Valuable Player
Tour	Player
2002	Eric Fonoimoana
2003	Jeff Nygaard
2004	Mike Lambert
2005	Jake Gibb
2006	Todd Rogers
2007	Phil Dalhausser
2008	Phil Dalhausser
2009	Phil Dalhausser
2013	Jake Gibb
2014	Jake Gibb
2015	John Mayer
2016	—N/a
2017	Phil Dalhausser
2018	Taylor Crabb
2019	Taylor Crabb
2020	—N/a
2021	—N/a
2022	Tri Bourne
2023	Andy Benesh
2024	Miles Partain
2025	Trevor Crabb

Rookie of the Year
Tour	Player
2002	Mike Lambert
2003	Matt Fuerbringer
2004	George Roumain
2005	Hans Stolfus
2006	Brad Keenan
2007	Bill Strickland
2008	Pedro Brazao
2009	Jonathan Acosta
2013	—N/a
2014	—N/a
2015	—N/a
2016	—N/a
2017	Eric Zaun
2018	Chase Budinger
2019	Miles Partain
2020	—N/a
2021	—N/a
2022	Taylor Sander
2023	DJ Klasnic
2024	
2025	

Team of the Year
Tour	Team
2002	—N/a
2003	Jeff Nygaard / Dain Blanton
2004	Karch Kiraly / Mike Lambert
2005	Jake Gibb / Stein Metzger
2006	Stein Metzger / Mike Lambert
2007	Phil Dalhausser / Todd Rogers
2008	Phil Dalhausser / Todd Rogers
2009	Phil Dalhausser / Todd Rogers
2013	Casey Patterson / Jake Gibb
2014	Casey Patterson / Jake Gibb
2015	Tri Bourne / John Hyden
2016	Casey Patterson / Jake Gibb
2017	Phil Dalhausser / Nick Lucena
2018	Jake Gibb / Taylor Crabb
2019	Jake Gibb / Taylor Crabb
2020	—N/a
2021	—N/a
2022	Tri Bourne / Trevor Crabb
2023	Andy Benesh / Miles Partain
2024	
2025	

Best Blocker
Tour	Player
2002	Mike Whitmarsh
2003	—N/a
2004	—N/a
2005	—N/a
2006	—N/a
2007	—N/a
2008	Phil Dalhausser
2009	Phil Dalhausser
2013	Theo Brunner
2014	Theo Brunner
2015	Phil Dalhausser
2016	Phil Dalhausser
2017	Phil Dalhausser
2018	Phil Dalhausser
2019	Phil Dalhausser
2020	—N/a
2021	—N/a
2022	Theo Brunner
2023	Andy Benesh
2024	Andy Benesh
2025	Phil Dalhausser

Best Server
Tour	Player
2002	Sean Rosenthal
2003	—N/a
2004	—N/a
2005	—N/a
2006	—N/a
2007	—N/a
2008	—N/a
2009	—N/a
2013	Andrei Belov
2014	Brad Keenan
2015	Robbie Page
2016	Jeremy Casebeer
2017	Phil Dalhausser
2018	Jeremy Casebeer
2019	Jeremy Casebeer
2020	—N/a
2021	—N/a
2022	Taylor Sander
2023	Paul Lotman
2024	Taylor Sander
2025	Hagen Smith

Best Defender
Tour	Player
2002	Karch Kiraly
2003	Casey Jennings
2004	Todd Rogers
2005	Todd Rogers
2006	Todd Rogers
2007	Todd Rogers, Sean Rosenthal
2008	Nick Lucena, Todd Rogers
2009	John Hyden
2013	John Hyden
2014	Nick Lucena
2015	John Mayer
2016	Taylor Crabb
2017	Taylor Crabb
2018	Taylor Crabb
2019	Taylor Crabb
2020	—N/a
2021	—N/a
2022	Taylor Crabb
2023	Taylor Crabb
2024	Miles Partain
2025	Taylor Crabb

Best Offensive Player
Tour	Player
2002	Mike Lambert
2003	Dain Blanton
2004	Mike Lambert
2005	Phil Dalhausser
2006	Phil Dalhausser
2007	Phil Dalhausser
2008	Phil Dalhausser
2009	Phil Dalhausser
2013	Casey Patterson
2014	Tri Bourne
2015	Ryan Doherty
2016	Phil Dalhausser
2017	Phil Dalhausser
2018	Phil Dalhausser
2019	Phil Dalhausser
2020	—N/a
2021	—N/a
2022	Miles Partain
2023	Miles Partain
2024	
2025	

Most Improved Player
Tour	Player
2002	Casey Jennings
2003	Casey Jennings
2004	Jake Gibb
2005	Sean Scott
2006	Phil Dalhausser
2007	Brad Keenan
2008	Nick Lucena
2009	John Mayer
2013	Tri Bourne
2014	Jeremy Casebeer
2015	Billy Kolinske
2016	—N/a
2017	Stafford Slick
2018	Ed Ratledge
2019	Chase Budinger
2020	—N/a
2021	—N/a
2022	Miles Partain
2023	Cody Caldwell
2024	
2025	

Newcomer of the Year
Tour	Player
2002	—N/a
2003	—N/a
2004	—N/a
2005	—N/a
2006	—N/a
2007	—N/a
2008	—N/a
2009	—N/a
2013	Tri Bourne
2014	Trevor Crabb
2015	Taylor Crabb
2016	Chase Frishman
2017	Ricardo Santos
2018	—N/a
2019	David Lee
2020	—N/a
2021	—N/a
2022	
2023	
2024	
2025	

Coach of the Year
Tour	Coach
2023	Mike Placek

Most Underrated
Tour	Player
2023	Trevor Crabb

Sinjin Smith Man of the Year
Tour	Player
2023	Adam Roberts

=== Women's award winners ===
Best Blocker
Tour	Player
2002	Elaine Youngs
2003	—N/a
2004	—N/a
2005	—N/a
2006	—N/a
2007	—N/a
2008	Kerri Walsh Jennings
2009	Lisa Fitzgerald
2013	Jennifer Fopma
2014	Lauren Fendrick
2015	Jenny Kropp
2016	Lauren Fendrick
2017	Lauren Fendrick
2018	Alix Klineman
2019	Alix Klineman
2020	—N/a
2021	—N/a
2022	Brandie Wilkerson
2023	Brandie Wilkerson
2024	Brandie Wilkerson
2025	Brandie Wilkerson

Best Server
Tour	Player
2002	Annett Davis
2003	—N/a
2004	—N/a
2005	—N/a
2006	—N/a
2007	—N/a
2008	—N/a
2009	—N/a
2013	April Ross
2014	April Ross
2015	April Ross
2016	April Ross
2017	April Ross
2018	Geena Urango
2019	Betsi Flint
2020	—N/a
2021	—N/a
2022	Betsi Flint
2023	Betsi Flint
2024	Toni Rodriguez
2025	Megan Kraft

Best Defender
Tour	Player
2002	Holly McPeak
2003	Holly McPeak
2004	Holly McPeak
2005	Rachel Wacholder
2006	Misty May-Treanor
2007	Misty May-Treanor
2008	Misty May-Treanor
2009	Brooke Niles
2013	Brooke Sweat
2014	Brooke Sweat
2015	Kendra VanZwieten
2016	Brooke Sweat
2017	Brooke Sweat
2018	Sara Hughes
2019	Melissa Humana-Paredes
2020	—N/a
2021	—N/a
2022	Sarah Sponcil
2023	Kristen Nuss
2024	Hailey Harward
2025	Kristen Nuss

Best Offensive Player
Tour	Player
2002	Elaine Youngs
2003	Kerri Walsh Jennings
2004	Misty May-Treanor
2005	Misty May-Treanor
2006	Misty May-Treanor
2007	Misty May-Treanor
2008	Misty May-Treanor
2009	Nicole Branagh
2013	April Ross
2014	Kerri Walsh Jennings
2015	Nicole Branagh
2016	Whitney Pavlik
2017	April Ross
2018	April Ross
2019	April Ross
2020	—N/a
2021	—N/a
2022	Kelly Cheng
2023	Kelly Cheng
2024	
2025	

Most Improved Player
Tour	Player
2002	Jenny Pavley
2003	Nancy Reynolds
2004	Jennifer Kessy
2005	Rachel Wacholder
2006	Nicole Branagh
2007	April Ross
2008	Nicole Branagh
2009	Priscilla Piantadosi-Lima, Lisa Fitzgerald
2013	Emily Day
2014	Kim DiCello
2015	Kendra VanZwieten
2016	Geena Urango
2017	Caitlin Ledoux
2018	Alix Klineman
2019	Jace Pardon
2020	—N/a
2021	—N/a
2022	Terese Cannon
2023	Julia Scoles
2024	
2025	

Newcomer of the Year
Tour	Player
2002	—N/a
2003	—N/a
2004	—N/a
2005	—N/a
2006	—N/a
2007	—N/a
2008	—N/a
2009	—N/a
2013	Lane Carico
2014	Amanda Dowdy
2015	Betsi Flint
2016	Kelly Reeves
2017	Maria Clara Salgado
2018	—N/a
2019	Melissa Humana-Paredes
2020	—N/a
2021	—N/a
2022	
2023	
2024	
2025	

Most Valuable Player
Tour	Player
2002	Elaine Youngs
2003	Kerri Walsh Jennings
2004	Kerri Walsh Jennings
2005	Misty May-Treanor
2006	Misty May-Treanor
2007	Misty May-Treanor
2008	Misty May-Treanor
2009	Nicole Branagh
2013	April Ross
2014	April Ross
2015	April Ross
2016	April Ross
2017	April Ross
2018	April Ross
2019	April Ross
2020	—N/a
2021	—N/a
2022	Kelly Cheng
2023	Kristen Nuss
2024	Geena Urango
2025	Geena Urango

Rookie of the Year
Tour	Player
2002	Angie Akers
2003	Jaimie Lee
2004	Tammy Leibl
2005	Nicole Branagh
2006	Logan Tom, April Ross
2007	Jenny Kropp
2008	Whitney Pavlik
2009	Raquel Ferreira
2013	—N/a
2014	—N/a
2015	—N/a
2016	—N/a
2017	Alix Klineman
2018	Brittany Howard
2019	Sarah Schermerhorn
2020	—N/a
2021	—N/a
2022	Julia Scoles
2023	Megan Rice
2024	
2025	

Team of the Year
Tour	Team
2002	—N/a
2003	Misty May-Treanor / Kerri Walsh Jennings
2004	Misty May-Treanor / Kerri Walsh Jennings
2005	Misty May-Treanor / Kerri Walsh Jennings
2006	Misty May-Treanor / Kerri Walsh Jennings
2007	Misty May-Treanor / Kerri Walsh Jennings
2008	Misty May-Treanor / Kerri Walsh Jennings
2009	Nicole Branagh / Elaine Youngs
2013	April Ross / Jennifer Kessy
2014	April Ross / Kerri Walsh Jennings
2015	Jenny Kropp / Nicole Branagh
2016	April Ross / Kerri Walsh Jennings
2017	Emily Day / Brittany Hochevar
2018	April Ross / Alix Klineman
2019	April Ross / Alix Klineman
2020	—N/a
2021	—N/a
2022	Taryn Kloth / Kristen Nuss
2023	Taryn Kloth / Kristen Nuss
2024	
2025	

== See also ==
- FIVB Beach Volleyball World Tour
