= Ryan Doherty =

American beach volleyball player

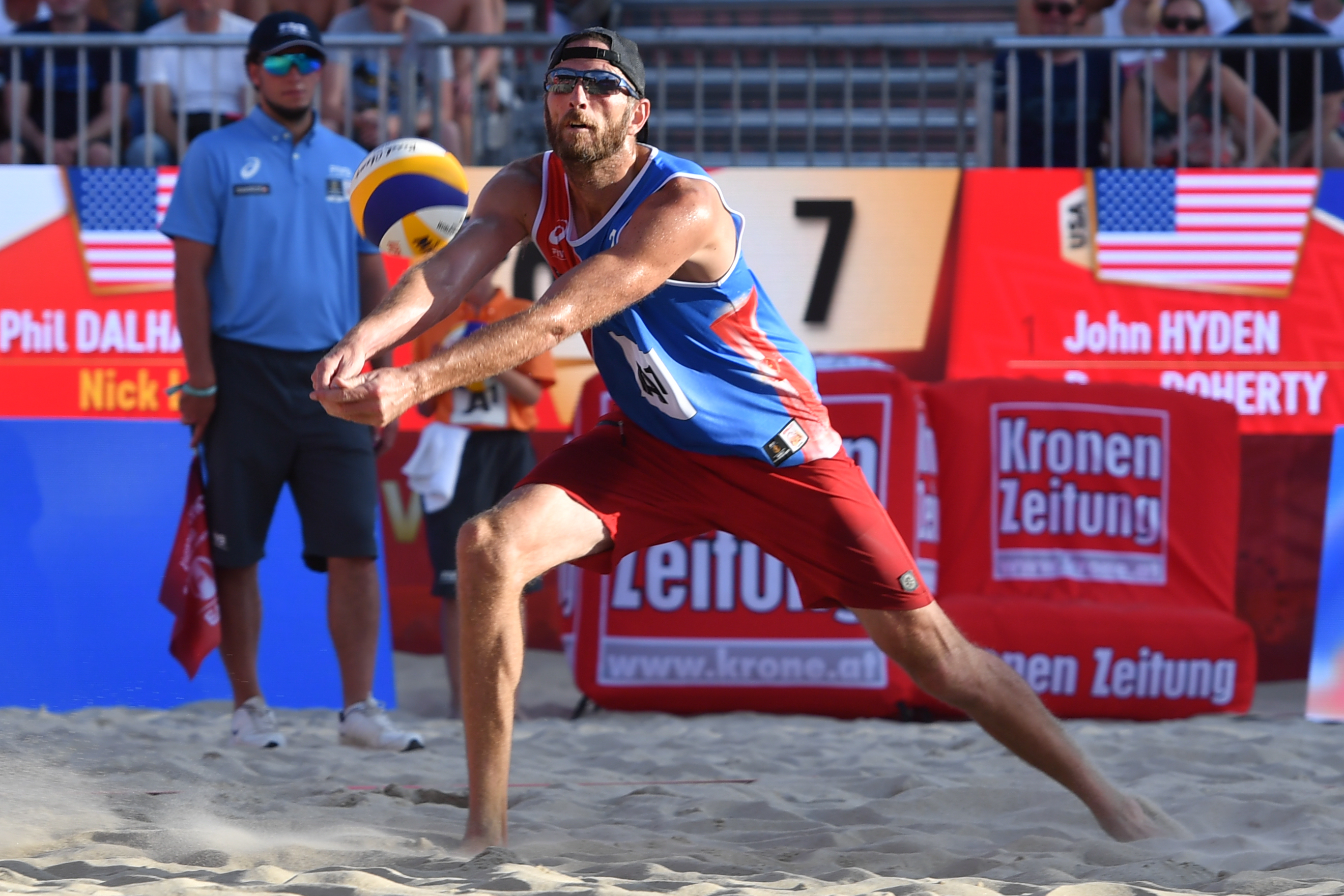

Personal information
- Nickname: Avatar
- Nationality: American
- Born: February 2, 1984 (age 42)
- Height: 7 ft 1 in (216 cm)
Beach volleyball information
- Years: Teammate
- –: John Hyden
Medal record
Men's beach volleyball
Representing the United States
World Tour
Silver medal – second place	2014 Berlin	Beach
Silver medal – second place	2017 Olsztyn	Beach
Bronze medal – third place	2014 Gstaad	Beach
Bronze medal – third place	2019 Kuala Lumpur	Beach

Ryan Daniel Doherty (born February 2, 1984) is an American professional beach volleyball player

== Career ==
=== Start in baseball ===
Doherty, who was born and raised in Toms River, New Jersey, grew up playing baseball, including at Toms River High School East. He was named the 2002 Gatorade Player of the Year for the state of New Jersey. In 2002, he was named an All-American, and was awarded a partial scholarship to play baseball at the University of Notre Dame. He is believed to have been the tallest player in the history of the National Collegiate Athletic Association baseball history. While at Notre Dame, he did not play collegiate volleyball due to his baseball commitments.

Doherty forgoed his senior season of college baseball and signed as a free agent by the Arizona Diamondbacks in June 2005. He became the first seven-foot-tall player in Minor League Baseball history when he played for the Yakima Bears in 2005. He moved up one minor league level the next two seasons, playing for the Single-A South Bend Silver Hawks in 2006 and the High-A Visalia Oaks in 2007. The Diamondbacks released Doherty in 2007, after just three appearances with Visalia. In his professional baseball career, he had a 12–4 record as a relief pitcher, with 6 saves and a 2.83 earned run average.

=== Move to beach volleyball ===
After his release from minor league baseball, Doherty moved to South Carolina and took up beach volleyball with Steve Johnson. Shortly afterward he decided to pursue a professional career and moved to Huntington Beach, California. He turned professional in 2010, competing in four events on the 2010 AVP Pro Beach Tour. Casey Patterson became his regular partner in 2012. They paired together to win the 2012 National Volleyball League Preakness event in Baltimore over highly ranked Phil Dalhausser and Todd Rogers.

In 2013, Doherty teamed up with Todd Rogers and began to compete not only in the domestic AVP Tour, but also internationally in the FIVB Beach Volleyball World Tour and NORCECA Beach Volleyball Circuit. Despite a number of top-five finishes, the Rogers/Doherty combination never placed first in a competition.

Starting with the October 2013 São Paulo Grand Slam on the 2013 FIVB Beach Volleyball World Tour, Doherty had switched partners to Nick Lucena.

In the 2015 AVP season, Doherty played with Pepperdine alum John Mayer.

Awards
Preceded by Álvaro Morais Filho (BRA)	Men's FIVB World Tour "Most Improved"; 2014	Succeeded by Lombardo Ontiveros (MEX)
