= Brooke Sweat =

American beach volleyball player (born 1986)

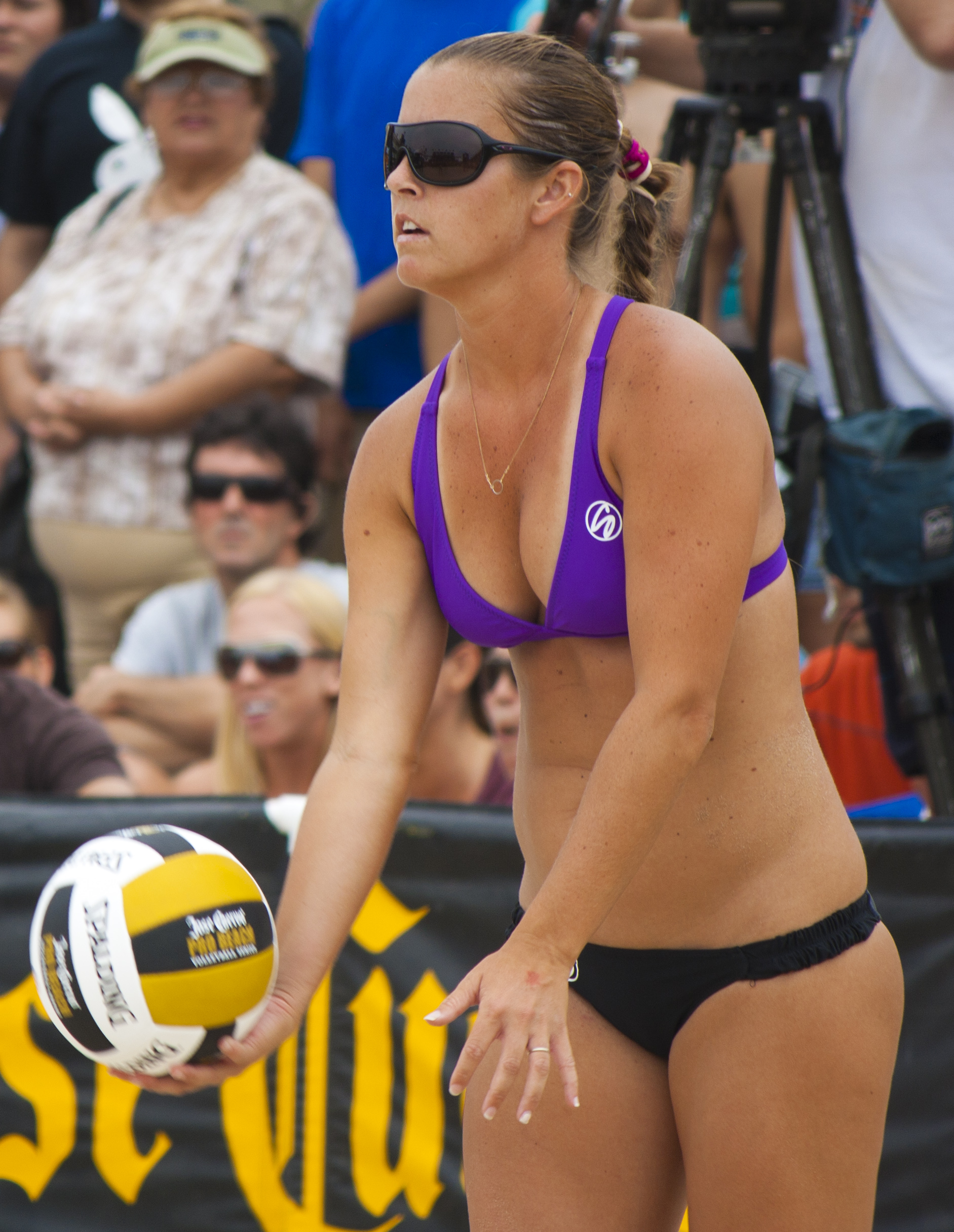
- Sweat at the Hermosa Beach Open in 2012

Personal information
- Full name: Brooke Youngquist Sweat
- Nationality: United States
- Born: Brooke Youngquist; March 27, 1986 (age 40); Fort Myers, Florida, U.S.
- Hometown: Fort Myers, Florida, U.S.
- Height: 5 ft 8 in (173 cm)
- Weight: 143 lb (65 kg)
- Education: Florida Gulf Coast University

Beach volleyball information

Current teammate
Years	Teammate
2019- present	Kerri Walsh-Jennings

Previous teammates
Years	Teammate
2014-2016; 2012-13; 2009-2011; 2009; 2008; 2007-2008	Lauren Fendrick; Jennifer Fopma; Kristen Batt; Morgan Flarity; Cindy Phillips; Kristy Hartley
Medal record
Women's beach volleyball
Representing the United States
World Tour
Gold medal – first place	2019 Jinjiang	Beach
Silver medal – second place	2017 Moscow	Beach
Silver medal – second place	2019 Kuala Lumpur	Beach
Silver medal – second place	2020 Qinzhou	Beach
Bronze medal – third place	2013 Berlin	Beach
Bronze medal – third place	2018 Qinzhou	Beach
Bronze medal – third place	2018 Fort Lauderdale	Beach
Bronze medal – third place	2019 Chetumal	Beach
Bronze medal – third place	2019 Sydney	Beach
Bronze medal – third place	2019 Moscow	Beach
Bronze medal – third place	2024 Sveti Vlas	Beach
Bronze medal – third place	2024 Kraków	Beach

Brooke Sweat (born Brooke Youngquist; March 27, 1986) is an American professional beach volleyball player, specializing as a defender. She started her career in 2007 with the AVP tours. Sweat had her best ever international (FIVB) finish with her then-partner Jennifer Fopma, when they placed third at the 2013 Berlin Grand Slam.

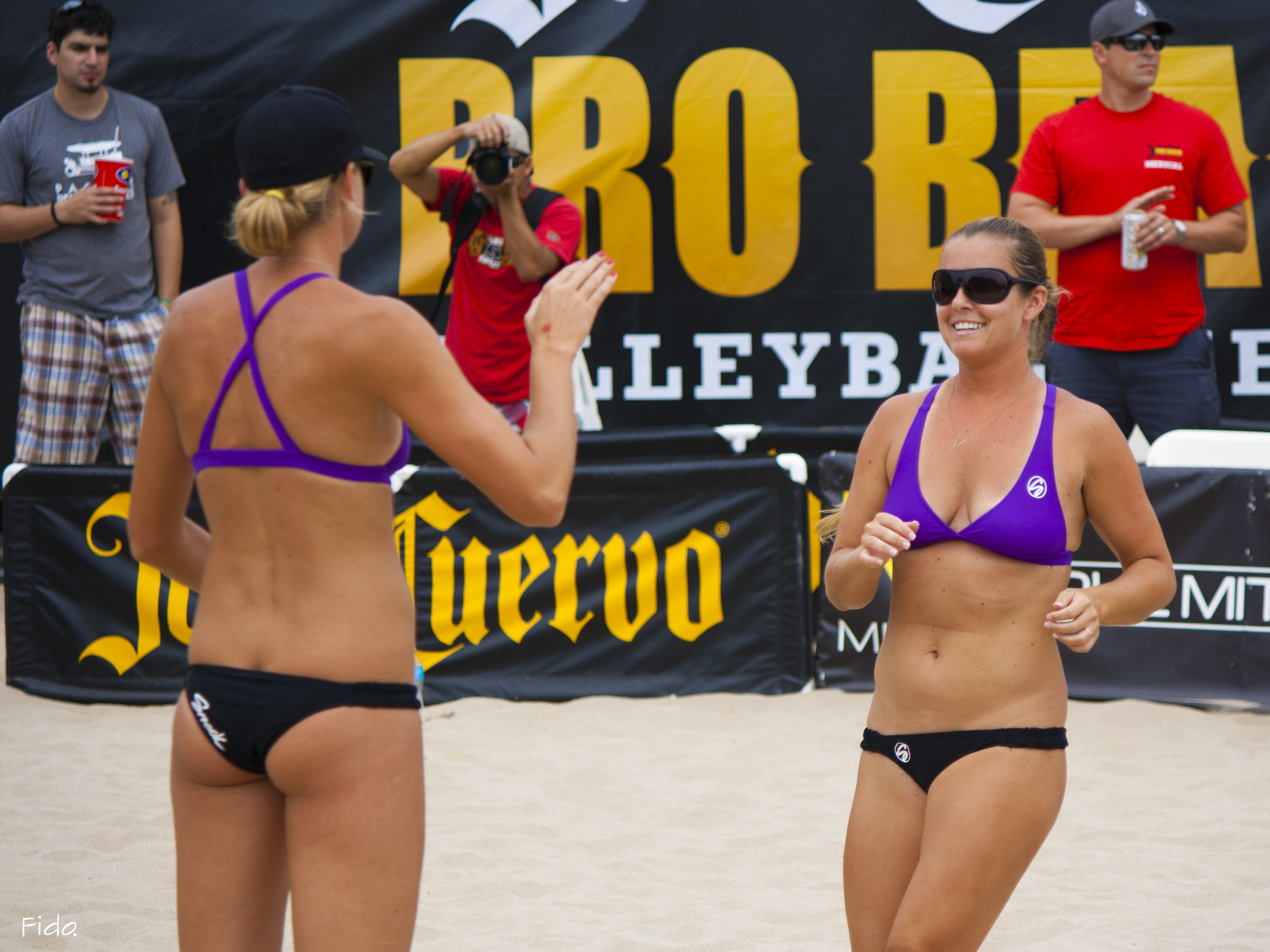
Jennifer Fopma (left) with Brooke in 2012

== Early life ==
Sweat played volleyball for Florida Gulf Coast University. She set the all-time school record with over 1,000 kills.

== Career ==
=== Rio de Janeiro 2016 ===
Sweat qualified for the 2016 Summer Olympics in Rio de Janeiro, Brazil with partner Lauren Fendrick. The pair played in Pool-A against Poland's Brzostek/Kolosinska (1–2), Brazil's Larissa/Talita (0–2), and Russia's Birlova/Ukolova (1–2), finishing in last place (0–3).

== Personal life ==
Sweat is married to fellow AVP player, Nicholas Sweat.
