= Emily Day =

American beach volleyball player

Emily Capers
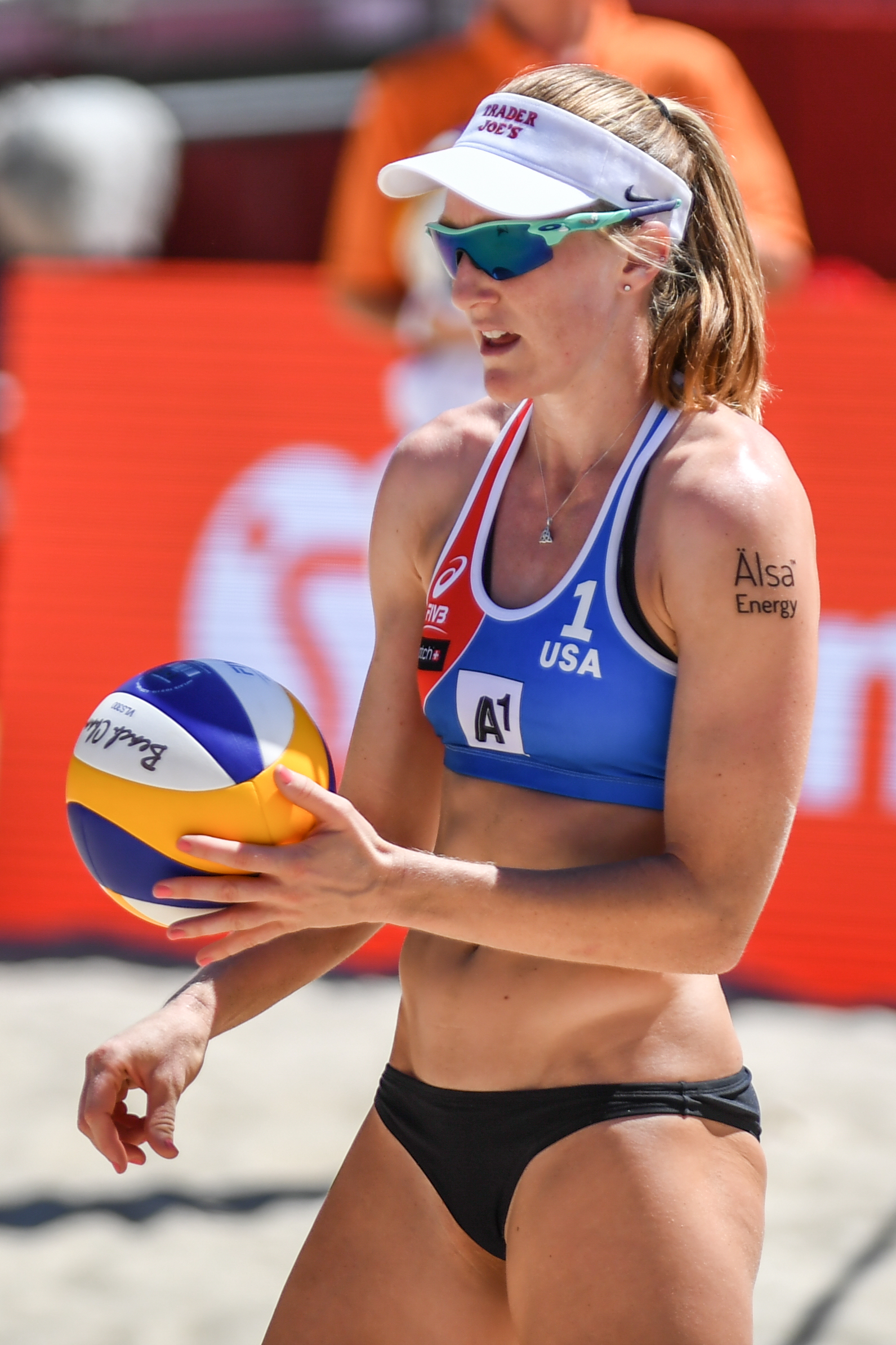
- Day at the 2017 Beach Volleyball World Championships in Vienna

Personal information
- Nationality: United States
- Born: Emily Day; August 9, 1987 (age 39) Torrance, California, U.S.
- Home town: Torrance, California, U.S.
- Height: 186 cm (6 ft 1 in)
Beach volleyball information
Current teammate
Years	Teammate	
2015	Jennifer Kessy	
Previous teammates
Years	Teammate	Tours (points)
2013–2014 ?–?	Summer Ross; Claire Robertson	NVBL, AVP
Medal record
Women's beach volleyball
Representing the United States
World Tour
Gold medal – first place	2018 Haiyang	Beach
Gold medal – first place	2021 Rubavu	Beach
Gold medal – first place	2021 Brno	Beach
Silver medal – second place	2019 Sydney	Beach
Silver medal – second place	2019 Edmonton	Beach
Bronze medal – third place	2016 Antalya	Beach
NORCECA Beach Volleyball Circuit
Gold medal – first place	2009 Jamaica	Beach
Universiade
Silver medal – second place	2011 Shenzhen	Beach

Emily Capers (née Day born August 9, 1987, in Torrance, California) is a retired female beach volleyball player from the United States who won the gold medal at the NORCECA Circuit 2009 in Jamaica playing with Claire Robertson.

She studied at Loyola Marymount University where she got a degree in applied mathematics with a minor in Business Administration, receiving as a student athlete the awards of All Tournament and MVP at the 2008 Four Points Sheraton Classic, All Tournament at the "MCM Elegante Lobo Classic", "Academic All-District team", 2008 All Conference First Team and All Academic.

She partnered with Jennifer Kessy to start the 2015 AVP season.

== Awards ==
=== College ===
- 2008 MCM Elegante Lobo Classic All Tournament
- 2008 Four Points Sheraton Classic All Tournament/MVP
- 2008 Collegiate Volleyball Update's Stellar Spikers Honorable Mention
- 2008 West Coast Conference All Academic Team
- 2008 All West Coast Conference First Team
- 2008 CoSIDA Academic All-District Third Team
- 2007 West Coast Conference All Academic Team
- 2007 All West Coast Conference First Team
- 2006 Hilton Phoenix/East Mesa Sun Devil Classic All Tournament
- 2006 West Coast Conference All Academic Team
- 2006 All West Coast Conference Honorable Mention
- 2005 Freshman All West Coast Conference First Team

=== AVP Pro Tour ===
- AVP Pro Tour Young Guns Manhattan Beach 2009 Gold Medal
- AVP Pro Tour Young Guns Long Beach 2009 Silver Medal
- AVP Pro Tour Champion Cincinnati Open 2013
- AVP Pro Tour Champion St. Petersburg Open (title split with opposing team Jenn Kessy/April Ross after cancellation due to weather)
- AVP Most Improved Player 2013
- AVP Pro Tour Manhattan Beach Open 2016, 2017 Gold Medal
- AVP Pro Tour Huntington Beach Open 2017 Gold Medal
- AVP Pro Tour Hermosa Beach Open 2017 Gold Medal
- AVP Team of the Year 2017 (with Brittany Hochevar)

=== National team ===
- NORCECA Beach Volleyball Circuit Jamaica 2009 Gold Medal
- FIVB Phuket Open 2013 Silver Medal
- USAV Beach Team of the Year 2011 (with Heather McGuire)
