= Tri Bourne =

American beach volleyball player

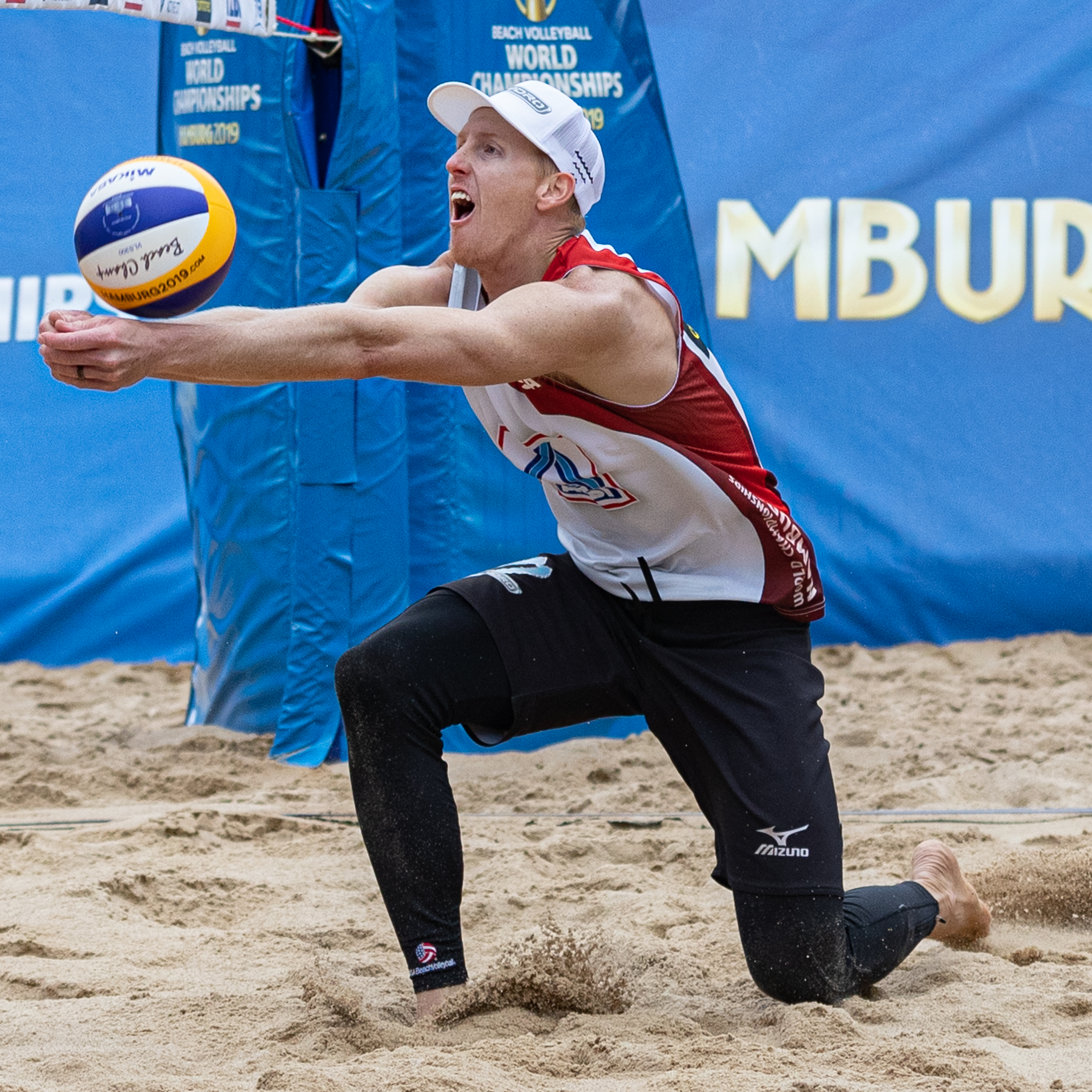
- 2019 Beach Volleyball World Championships

Personal information
- Nationality: American
- Born: June 20, 1989 (age 37) Oahu, Hawaii
- Education: University of Southern California
- Height: 6 ft 5 in (196 cm)
Medal record
Men's beach volleyball
Representing the United States
World Tour Finals
Bronze medal – third place	2016 Toronto	Beach
World Tour
Gold medal – first place	2014 Berlin	Beach
Gold medal – first place	2019 Qinzhou	Beach
Silver medal – second place	2016 Xiamen	Beach
Bronze medal – third place	2016 Doha	Beach
Bronze medal – third place	2016 Sochi	Beach
Bronze medal – third place	2020 Chetumal	Beach

Tri Bourne (born June 20, 1989 in Oahu, Hawaii) is a professional American beach volleyball player. He was formerly a professional indoor player and NCAA Division 1 Men's Volleyball player for the USC Trojans. He has been a part of the United States indoor and beach national teams since 2005. He was born on the Hawaiian island of Oahu, where he grew up. His father Peter Bourne and mother Katy Bourne are both triathletes.

Bourne and Jake Gibb finished 9th at the 2020 Summer Olympics after replacing Taylor Crabb who tested positive for COVID-19. Bourne is currently partnered with Evan Cory.

Bourne announced his retirement in 2025, and retired after playing in his AVP tournament, the Manhattan Beach Open 2025.

== Player Bio ==
2013 AVP Rookie of the Year 2013 AVP Most Improved Player From the USC Roster: Bourne, one of USC's most versatile players, returns as a starting outside hitter as a senior in 2011.

=== 2010 ===
He started 16 matches (13 at outside hitter and 3 at libero) as a junior. Overall while appearing in 19 matches, he had 142 kills while hitting .244, plus 135 digs, 33 blocks and eight aces. He was in double kill figures nine times and had five-plus digs 16 times (including three times with 10-plus digs). He missed USC's last 5 matches of 2010 with a broken thumb.

=== 2009 ===
After being slowed in the pre-season and the first half of the 2009 campaign with a sore back, Bourne started the final 14 matches of 2009 at outside hitter as a sophomore and was effective. Overall while appearing in 26 matches, he had 162 kills while hitting .236, plus 117 digs, 56 blocks and 11 aces. He was in double kill figures nine times, had five-plus blocks 13 times (including six times with 10-plus digs) and five-plus blocks four times (with a best of 10).

=== 2008 ===
He started the last eight matches of 2008 at opposite hitter as a first-year freshman. Overall while appearing in 16 matches, he had 59 kills, 99 digs, 24 blocks and four aces. He had five-plus digs seven times, including five matches with 10-plus digs (including twice with a USC season-high 20, setting a school record for most 20-dig matches in a season). He was slowed early in the 2008 season after having an appendectomy in the fall of 2007.

=== High school ===
He attended Academy of the Pacific in Honolulu, Hawaii, but played for Maryknoll High because AOP did not have a volleyball team. He helped Maryknoll win the 2006 Division II state volleyball title as a senior. He made the 2007 Volleyball Magazine Fab 50 list, Honolulu Advertiser All-State first team and the All-Interscholastic League of Honolulu Division II first team. He was also played basketball, where he was the 2007 Interscholastic League of Honolulu Division II Co-Player of the Year (with current Trojan Riley McKibbin) while averaging 10.3 points a game as a center, and was involved in canoe racing with the Outrigger Canoe Club.

=== Personal ===
He was on the 2009 U.S Men's Junior National Team that placed eighth at the FIVB World Championship. He was on the 2008 USA Volleyball Junior National team that won a bronze medal at the 2008 NORCECA Junior Championships. He was a member of the 2007 U.S. Boys' Youth National Team that competed in the FIVB Boys' Youth World Championships. He and fellow Trojan Riley McKibbin won the gold medal at the 2007 AAU Junior National Beach Volleyball Under-20 Championships. He made the All-Tournament team of the 18 Open division at the 2007 USA Junior Olympic Boys' Volleyball Championships as he led his Outrigger Canoe Club team to the bronze medal."

Tri was a crucial part of the USC Men's volleyball trip to the NCAA championship in 2009.

== Statistics ==
Tri is 6 feet 5 inches tall and weighs approximately 195 pounds. Career single-match highs: 19 kills (UCLA, 2009), 20 digs (Hawaii and Pepperdine, 2008), 10 blocks (UCLA, 2009).

Tri Bourne
Height	6 ft 6 in (1.98 m)
Weight	195 lb (88 kg)
Standing Vertical Jump	32 inches
Approach Vertical Jump	38 inches

	G	M	K	E	TA	PCT	AST	SA	SE	RE	DG	BS	BA	BE
2008 (Freshman Season)	46	16	59	49	170	.059	4	4	22	6	99	2	22	4
2009 (Sophomore Season)	83	26	162	74	272	.236	14	11	26	14	117	4	52	6
2010 (Junior Season)	68	19	142	62	328	.244	14	8	12	17	135	2	31	6
Career	197	61	363	185	770	.231	32	23	60	67	351	8	105	16

.

Awards
Preceded by Álvaro Morais Filho (BRA)	Men's FIVB World Tour "Top Rookie"; 2014	Succeeded by Adrian Carambula (ITA)
