= John Hyden =

American volleyball player

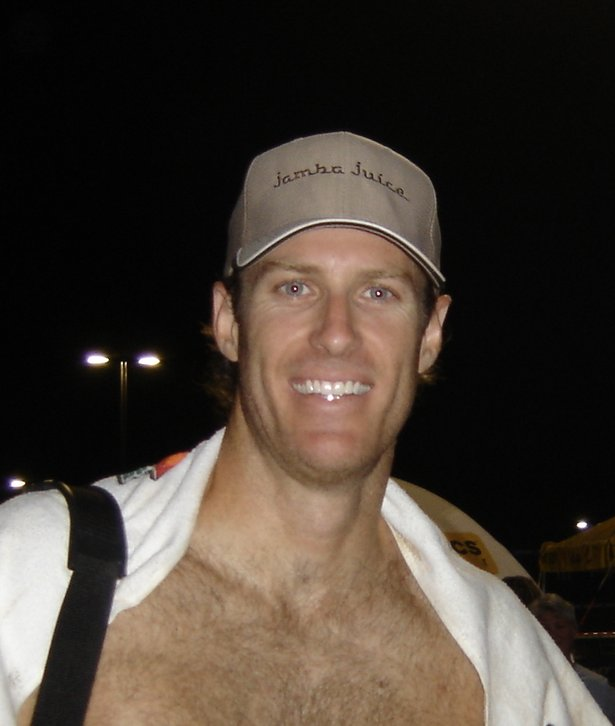
- John Hyden in 2007

Personal information
- Born: October 7, 1972 (age 54); Tustin, California, U.S.
- Height: 6 ft 5 in (196 cm)
- Education: San Diego State University

Volleyball information
- Position: Outside hitter
- Number: 3 (1996); 7 (2000); 9 (SDSU)

National team
1995–1996, 2000	United States
Medal record
Men's beach volleyball
Representing the United States
World Tour Finals
Bronze medal – third place	2016 Toronto	Beach
World Tour
Gold medal – first place	2014 Berlin	Beach
Silver medal – second place	2016 Xiamen	Beach
Silver medal – second place	2017 Olsztyn	Beach
Bronze medal – third place	2016 Doha	Beach
Bronze medal – third place	2016 Sochi	Beach
Bronze medal – third place	2019 Kuala Lumpur	Beach

John Hyden (born October 7, 1972) is an American volleyball and beach volleyball player. Raised in San Diego, California, where he attended Mt. Carmel High School, Hyden was a member of the United States men's national volleyball team that finished in ninth place at the 1996 Summer Olympics in Atlanta. At the 2000 Summer Olympics in Sydney, he finished in eleventh place with the national team.

== College ==
Hyden was a first-team All-American at San Diego State University (SDSU) in 1994 and 1995. At SDSU, he set the record for most kills in a match with 56.

In 2010, Hyden was inducted into the San Diego State Hall of Fame.

== Beach volleyball ==
Hyden also plays beach volleyball as a defender. He has played on the Association of Volleyball Professionals (AVP) circuit for two decades, remaining consistently in the top eight teams. He got a first-place finish in 2005. 2007 saw him with many third and fifth-place finishes. He also won the coveted "God of the Beach" tournament in Las Vegas in 2007 and 2008. In 2009, Hyden was awarded the best defensive player of the AVP.

In 2018, Hyden became the oldest male player to win an AVP tournament at 45 years, 9 months, and 22 days of age. Hyden also played in an AVP final at the age of 50 in December 2022, losing to the 42-year-old Phil Dalhausser and Taylor Crabb.

Awards
Preceded by Reinder Nummerdor (NED)	Men's FIVB World Tour "Most Inspirational"; 2017	Succeeded by Incumbent
