= Lauren Fendrick =

American beach volleyball player (born 1982)

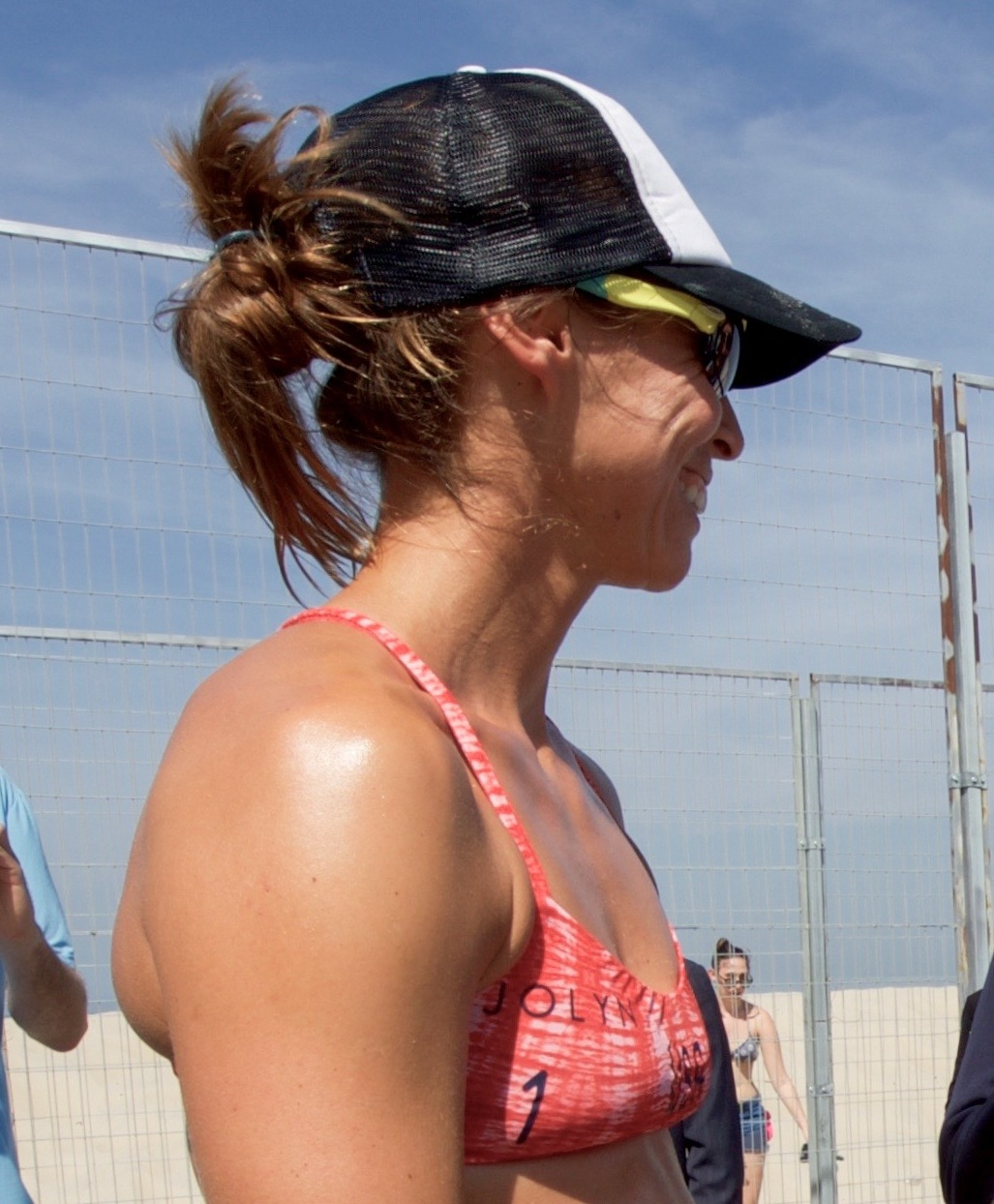
- Fendrick in 2016

Personal information
- Born: March 20, 1982 (age 44) San Diego, California, U.S.
- Home town: Carlsbad, California, U.S.
- Education: UCLA
- Height: 6 ft 2 in (188 cm)
- Weight: 165 lb (75 kg)
Beach volleyball information
Current teammate
- Years: Teammate
- 2017: April Ross
Previous teammates
- Years: Teammate
- 2014-2016 2013 2010-12 2008-10: Brooke Sweat; Brittany Hochevar; Brooke Niles; Ashley Ivy
Medal record
Women's beach volleyball
Representing the United States
World Championships
Silver medal – second place	2017 Vienna	Beach
World Tour
Gold medal – first place	2020 Siem Reap	Beach

Lauren Fendrick (born March 20, 1982) is an American beach volleyball player. She competed in beach volleyball at the 2016 Summer Olympics with teammate Brooke Sweat. In 2017, Fendrick and new teammate April Ross placed second at the FIVB Beach Volleyball World Championships.

== Early life and education ==
Fendrick was born March 20, 1982 in San Diego, California. She grew up in Carlsbad, California. From a young age she showed an interest in sports, competing in basketball, tennis, volleyball, and softball.

Fendrick attended UCLA and graduated with magna cum laude with a degree in communication studies. She then went on to study law at University of Southern California graduating in 2010. Fendrick passed the bar, but as of 2016 does not practice law.

== Volleyball career ==
Fendrick played indoor volleyball at UCLA from 1999-2002 where she led the team in kills her last two seasons. During her time playing for UCLA, Fendrick was honored as a 2002 U.S. Volleyball Association (USVBA) All-American.

Following her time at UCLA, Fendrick joined the AVP tour as a beach volleyball player. In 2014, she teamed with Brooke Sweat. The pair qualified with the U.S. Olympic Beach Volleyball Team to compete in the 2016 Olympic Games in Rio. Sweat and Fendrick qualified as the second team for the United States, ranked below Kerri Walsh-Jennings and her partner April Ross, by ranking as one of the top seventeen teams in the world. At the Olympics, Fendrick and Sweat finished in last place for Pool A, eliminating them from the tournament.

In spring 2017, Fendrick partnered with Ross for the upcoming volleyball season. The pair finished second at the 2017 world beach volleyball championships in Vienna, Austria. The finish made Ross and Fendrick the first U.S. team, female or male, to medal at the event since 2011.

Fendrick temporarily teamed with Nicole Branagh in 2018 while Branagh's partner, Walsh-Jennings, recovered from injury. In May 2018, Fendrick entered the Association of Volleyball Professionals in Austin, Texas with Loyola Marymount collegiate athlete Sarah Sponcil. After taking a break from volleyball in 2019 for the birth of her first child, Fendrick returned to competition with partner Sara Hughes with the aim of earning a spot in the 2020 Summer Olympics.

== Personal life ==
She married volleyball coach Andrew Fuller in February 2013. In June 2019, Fendrick gave birth to her first child, a daughter. In April 2021, she gave birth to her second child, a son.
