= Nick Lucena =

American beach volleyball player

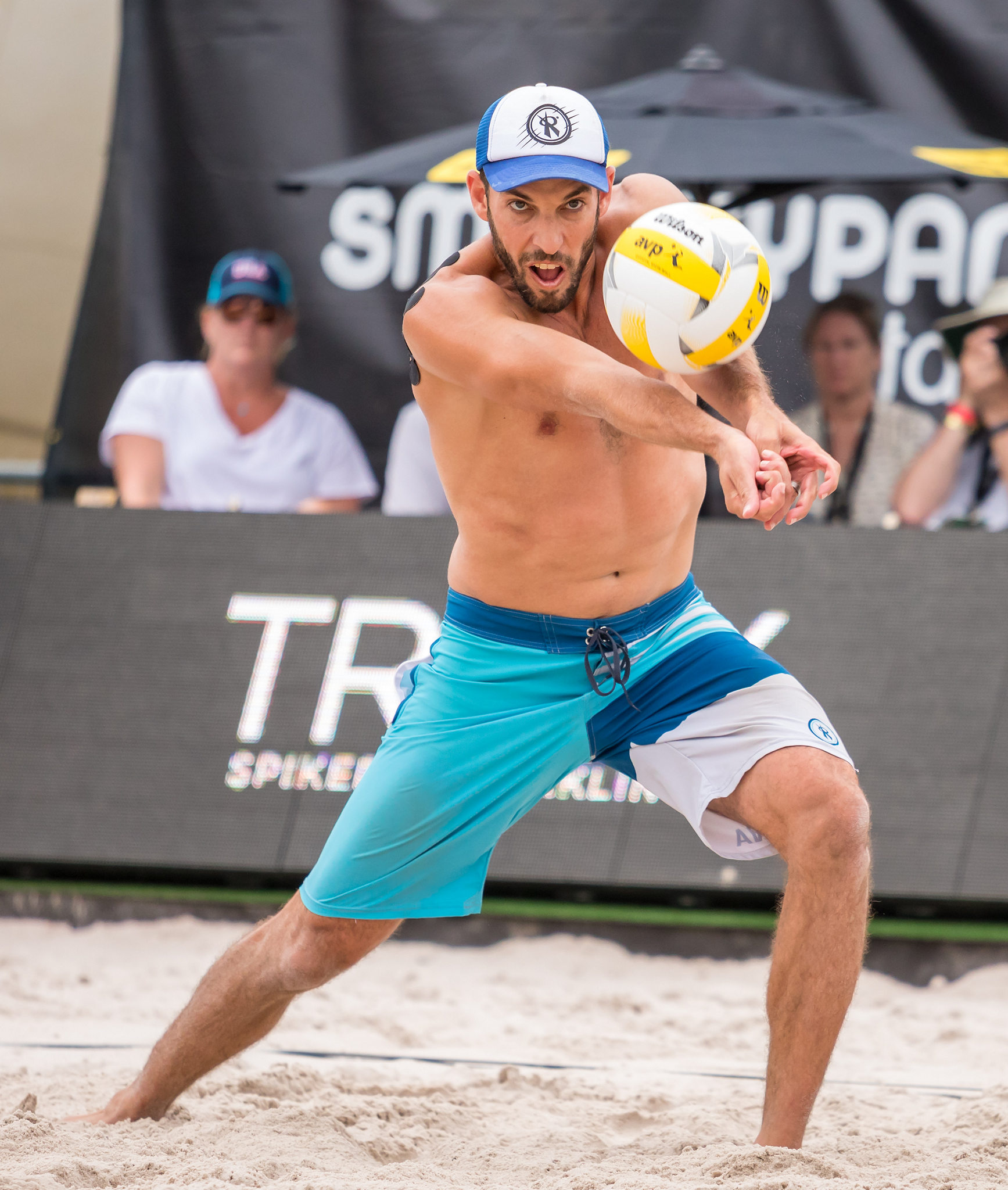
- Lucena at the 2017 AVP Austin Open

Personal information
- Full name: Nicholas Lucena
- Nicknames: Tricky Nick, Nick the Quick
- Born: September 22, 1979 (age 47) Fort Lauderdale, Florida, U.S.
- Home town: Cooper City, Florida, U.S.
- Education: Florida State University
- Height: 6 ft 1 in (185 cm)
- Weight: 169 lb (77 kg)
Beach volleyball information
Current teammate
- Years: Teammate
- 2015–2021: Phil Dalhausser
Medal record
Men's beach volleyball
Representing the United States
World Tour Finals
Gold medal – first place	2017 Hamburg	Beach
Silver medal – second place	2015 Fort Lauderdale	Beach
World Tour
Gold medal – first place	2015 Xiamen	Beach
Gold medal – first place	2016 Puerto Vallarta	Beach
Gold medal – first place	2016 Maceió	Beach
Gold medal – first place	2016 Fuzhou	Beach
Gold medal – first place	2016 Hamburg	Beach
Gold medal – first place	2017 Moscow	Beach
Gold medal – first place	2017 Gstaad	Beach
Gold medal – first place	2018 Fort Lauderdale	Beach
Silver medal – second place	2010 Klagenfurt	Beach
Silver medal – second place	2011 Québec	Beach
Silver medal – second place	2012 Brasilia	Beach
Silver medal – second place	2014 Berlin	Beach
Silver medal – second place	2015 Long Beach	Beach
Silver medal – second place	2015 Sochi	Beach
Silver medal – second place	2016 Doha	Beach
Silver medal – second place	2016 Gstaad	Beach
Silver medal – second place	2016 Long Beach	Beach
Silver medal – second place	2019 Doha	Beach
Bronze medal – third place	2010 Milner	Beach
Bronze medal – third place	2014 Gstaad	Beach
Bronze medal – third place	2015 St. Petersburg	Beach
Bronze medal – third place	2016 Cincinnati	Beach
Bronze medal – third place	2017 Fort Lauderdale	Beach
Bronze medal – third place	2021 Cancún	Beach

Nicholas Lucena (born September 22, 1979) is an American retired professional beach volleyball player. Lucena grew up in Davie, Florida and played indoor volleyball at Western High School. In his youth, he played beach volleyball at Fort Lauderdale Beach. He then went to Florida State University, where he graduated before embarking on his beach volleyball career.

Lucena and his former teammate, Phil Dalhausser, played in the 2016 Summer Olympics in Rio de Janeiro. Lucena played as a defender behind Dalhausser's block.

Lucena and Dalhausser had qualified to represent the United States at the 2020 Summer Olympics in Tokyo, but did not place. In his career, Lucena won 29 tournaments and $1,400,000 in prize money.
