= Casey Patterson (beach volleyball) =

American beach volleyball player (born 1980)

Personal information
- Born: April 20, 1980 (age 46); Van Nuys, California, U.S.
- Hometown: Huntington Beach, California, U.S.
- Height: 6 ft 6 in (198 cm)
- Education: BYU

Beach volleyball information

Current teammate
Teammate
Chase Budinger - 2021
Medal record
Men's beach volleyball
Representing the United States
World Tour
Gold medal – first place	2013 Shanghai	Beach
Gold medal – first place	2015 St. Petersburg	Beach
Silver medal – second place	2013 Corrientes	Beach
Silver medal – second place	2015 Olsztyn	Beach
Bronze medal – third place	2013 Gstaad	Beach
Bronze medal – third place	2014 Stare Jabłonki	Beach
Bronze medal – third place	2018 Tokyo	Beach

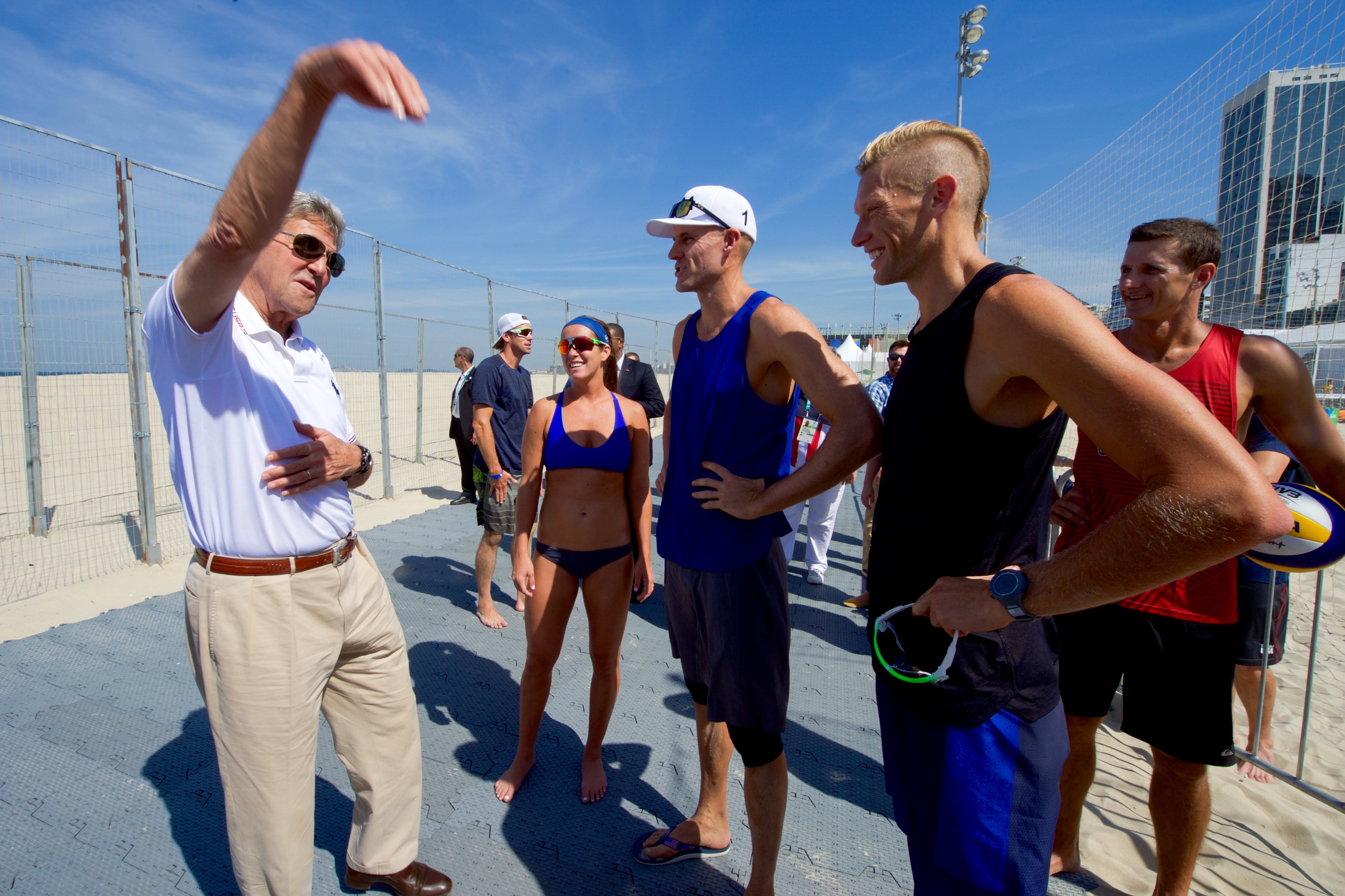
U.S. Secretary of State John Kerry speaks with U.S. Olympic men's beach volleyball player Casey Patterson (far right) and other team members on the Copacobana beach in Rio de Janeiro, Brazil, on August 6, 2016

Casey Patterson (born April 20, 1980) is an American professional beach volleyball player based out of Huntington Beach, California. Patterson and his former teammate, Jake Gibb, were named the USAV Team of the Year as well as AVP Team of the Year for 2013. Casey himself was named AVP Best Offensive Player for 2013. He has had a total of fifteen 1st-place finishes during his professional career.

Patterson and Gibb competed for the United States in beach volleyball at the 2016 Summer Olympics.
