= Brittany Hochevar =

American volleyball and beach volleyball player (born 1981)

Personal information
- Nationality: American
- Born: May 26, 1981 (age 45) Fowler, Colorado, U.S.
- Height: 6 ft 0 in (183 cm)

Volleyball information
- Position: opposite hitter setter
- Number: 10 (national team)

Career
- Years: Team
- 2004: Long Beach State

National team
- Years: Team
- 2003–2004: United States
Medal record
Women's beach volleyball
Representing the United States
World Tour
Silver medal – second place	2018 Xiamen	Beach
Women's volleyball
Pan American Games
Bronze medal – third place	2003 Santo Domingo	Team

Brittany Hart (née Hochevar, born May 26, 1981) is an American former volleyball and beach volleyball player.

== Career ==
Her hometown is Fowler, Colorado. She was part of the United States women's national volleyball team, playing as an opposite hitter and setter. She participated in the 2004 Women's Pan-American Volleyball Cup.

As a beach volleyball player, she plays as a defender. She played together with Lisa Rutledge in 2011 and with Lauren Fendrick in 2013. Hochevar and Fendrick were eliminated in the quarter-final at the 2013 Beach Volleyball World Championships.

== Personal life ==
Hochevar is married to Anthony Hart. They have two sons.
