= 2019 Beach Volleyball World Championships – Women's tournament =

Beachvolleyball-Weltmeisterschaft Hamburg 2019

Tournament details
- Host country: Germany
- City: Hamburg
- Dates: 28 June – 7 July
- Teams: 48 (from 5 confederations)

Final positions
- Champions: Canada; Sarah Pavan; Melissa Humana-Paredes (1st title)
- Runners-up: United States; Alix Klineman; April Ross
- Third place: Australia; Taliqua Clancy; Mariafe Artacho del Solar
- Fourth place: Switzerland; Nina Betschart; Tanja Hüberli

The women's tournament was held from 28 June to 7 July.

Sarah Pavan and Melissa Humana-Paredes defeated Alix Klineman and April Ross to win the title, while Taliqua Clancy and Mariafe Artacho del Solar captured the bronze medal by beating Nina Betschart and Tanja Hüberli.

== Qualification ==
There were 48 teams qualified for the tournament. Normally, the host country obtained two places in the competition as well as the top 23 teams from FIVB World ranking. But, both of the hosted teams ranked among the 23 teams, so the two next highest ranked team qualified. The next 20 teams belonged to five continental confederation which got four spots each. The last three spots were appointed by FIVB.

Mean of qualification	Country	Qualifier	Seed
FIVB World Ranking	Germany	Sandra Ittlinger–Chantal Laboureur	1
FIVB World Ranking	~~Czech Republic~~	~~Barbora Hermannová–Markéta Sluková~~	~~2~~
FIVB World Ranking	Canada	Heather Bansley–Brandie Wilkerson	3
FIVB World Ranking	Brazil	Ana Patricia Ramos–Rebecca Cavalcanti	4
FIVB World Ranking	United States	Alix Klineman–April Ross	5
FIVB World Ranking	Brazil	Ágatha Bednarczuk–Eduarda Santos Lisboa	6
FIVB World Ranking	Australia	Taliqua Clancy–Mariafe Artacho del Solar	7
FIVB World Ranking	Netherlands	Sanne Keizer–Madelein Meppelink	8
FIVB World Ranking	Canada	Sarah Pavan–Melissa Humana-Paredes	9
FIVB World Ranking	Brazil	Maria Antonelli–Carolina Solberg Salgado	10
FIVB World Ranking	United States	Sara Hughes–Summer Ross	11
FIVB World Ranking	Brazil	Bárbara Seixas–Fernanda Alves	12
FIVB World Ranking	United States	Brooke Sweat–Kerri Walsh Jennings	13
FIVB World Ranking	United States	Sarah Sponcil–Kelly Claes	14
FIVB World Ranking	United States	Kelley Larsen–Emily Stockman	15
FIVB World Ranking	Switzerland	Nina Betschart–Tanja Hüberli	16
FIVB World Ranking	Finland	Taru Lahti-Liukkonen–Anniina Parkkinen	17
FIVB World Ranking	Russia	Nadezda Makroguzova–Svetlana Kholomina	18
FIVB World Ranking	Germany	Karla Borger–Julia Sude	19
FIVB World Ranking	Poland	Katarzyna Kociołek–Kinga Wojtasik	20
FIVB World Ranking	Spain	Liliana Fernández–Elsa Baquerizo	21
FIVB World Ranking	China	Xia Xinyi–Wang Fan	22
FIVB World Ranking	Germany	Kim Behrens–Cinja Tillmann	23
FIVB World Ranking	Italy	Marta Menegatti–Viktoria Orsi Toth	24
FIVB World Ranking	Germany	Victoria Bieneck–Isabel Schneider	25
AVC Qualification	Japan	Miki Koshikawa–Megumi Murakami	29
AVC Qualification	China	Xue Chen–Wang Xinxin	33
AVC Qualification	Australia	Nicole Laird–Becchara Palmer	35
AVC Qualification	China	Zeng Jinjin–Lin Meimei	36
CAVB Qualification	Nigeria	Tochukwu Nnoruga–Francisca Ikhiede	45
CAVB Qualification	Egypt	Randa Radwan–Doaa Elghobashy	46
CAVB Qualification	Mauritius	Maita Cousin–Letendrie Nathalie	47
CAVB Qualification	Rwanda	Charlotte Nzayisenga–Judith Hakizimana	48
CEV Qualification	Slovakia	Andrea Štrbová–Natália Dubovcová	26
CEV Qualification	Russia	Evgenia Ukolova–Ekaterina Birlova	27
CEV Qualification	Netherlands	Joy Stubbe–Marleen van Iersel	28
CEV Qualification	Latvia	Tina Graudina–Anastasija Kravčenoka	31
CSV Qualification	Argentina	Ana Gallay–Fernanda Pereyra	37
CSV Qualification	Colombia	Yuli Ayala–Diana Ríos	41
CSV Qualification	Paraguay	Michelle Valiente–Patricia Caballero	43
CSV Qualification	Uruguay	Camila Bausero–María Rotti	44
NORCECA Qualification	Canada	Megan McNamara–Nicole McNamara	34
NORCECA Qualification	Mexico	Martha Revuelta–Zaira Orellana	38
NORCECA Qualification	Cuba	Leila Martínez–Mailen Deliz	40
NORCECA Qualification	Nicaragua	Valeria Mendoza–Lolette Rodríguez	42
Wild cards	Germany	Margareta Kozuch–Laura Ludwig	30
Wild cards	Switzerland	Joana Heidrich–Anouk Vergé-Dépré	32
Wild cards	Germany	Leonie Körtzinger–Sarah Schneider	39
Wild cards	Austria	Lena Plesiutschnig–Katharina Schützenhöfer	2

== Preliminary round ==
The draw was held on 4 June 2019.

All times are local (UTC+2).

=== Pool A ===
Pos	Team	Pld	W	L	Pts	SW	SL	SR	SPW	SPL	SPR	Qualification
1	(Italy) Menegatti–Toth	3	3	0	6	6	0	MAX	126	88	1.432	Round of 32
2	(Germany) Ittlinger–Laboureur	3	2	1	5	4	2	2.000	121	110	1.100	Round of 32
3	(Canada) M. McNamara–N. McNamara	3	1	2	4	2	4	0.500	118	116	1.017	Lucky losers playoffs
4	(Paraguay) Valiente–Caballero	3	0	3	3	0	6	0.000	75	126	0.595	

Date	Time		Score		Set 1	Set 2	Set 3	Total	Report
28 Jun	13:00	Ittlinger–Laboureur (Germany)	2–0	(Paraguay) Valiente–Caballero	21–15	21–10		42–25	Report
28 Jun	13:00	Menegatti–Toth (Italy)	2–0	(Canada) M. McNamara–N. McNamara	21–18	21–15		42–33	Report
29 Jun	17:00	Ittlinger–Laboureur (Germany)	2–0	(Canada) M. McNamara–N. McNamara	22–20	25–23		47–43	Report
29 Jun	17:00	Menegatti–Toth (Italy)	2–0	(Paraguay) Valiente–Caballero	21–11	21–12		42–23	Report
1 Jul	19:00	M. McNamara–N. McNamara (Canada)	2–0	(Paraguay) Valiente–Caballero	21–13	21–14		42–27	Report
1 Jul	20:30	Ittlinger–Laboureur (Germany)	0–2	(Italy) Menegatti–Toth	17–21	15–21		32–42	Report

=== Pool B ===
Pos	Team	Pld	W	L	Pts	SW	SL	SR	SPW	SPL	SPR	Qualification
1	(Latvia) Graudina–Kravčenoka	3	3	0	6	6	0	MAX	126	91	1.385	Round of 32
2	(Austria) Plesiutschnig–Schützenhöfer	3	2	1	5	4	3	1.333	125	110	1.136	Round of 32
3	(Germany) Körtzinger–Schneider	3	1	2	4	3	5	0.600	124	147	0.844	Lucky losers playoffs
4	(Poland) Kociołek–Wojtasik	3	0	3	3	1	6	0.167	113	140	0.807	

Date	Time		Score		Set 1	Set 2	Set 3	Total	Report
28 Jun	14:00	Plesiutschnig–Schützenhöfer (Austria)	2–1	(Germany) Körtzinger–Schneider	21–10	16–21	15–8	52–39	Report
28 Jun	14:00	Kociołek–Wojtasik (Poland)	0–2	(Latvia) Graudina–Kravčenoka	15–21	16–21		31–42	Report
29 Jun	15:00	Plesiutschnig–Schützenhöfer (Austria)	0–2	(Latvia) Graudina–Kravčenoka	14–21	15–21		29–42	Report
29 Jun	15:00	Kociołek–Wojtasik (Poland)	1–2	(Germany) Körtzinger–Schneider	21–23	21–16	11–15	53–54	Report
1 Jul	13:00	Plesiutschnig–Schützenhöfer (Austria)	2–0	(Poland) Kociołek–Wojtasik	23–21	21–8		44–29	Report
1 Jul	14:00	Graudina–Kravčenoka (Latvia)	2–0	(Germany) Körtzinger–Schneider	21–14	21–17		42–31	Report

=== Pool C ===
Pos	Team	Pld	W	L	Pts	SW	SL	SR	SPW	SPL	SPR	Qualification
1	(Switzerland) Heidrich–Vergé-Dépré	3	3	0	6	6	1	6.000	136	103	1.320	Round of 32
2	(Canada) Bansley–Wilkerson	3	2	1	5	5	3	1.667	140	120	1.167	Round of 32
3	(Germany) Behrens–Tillmann	3	1	2	4	3	4	0.750	123	114	1.079	Round of 32
4	(Uruguay) Bausero–Rotti	3	0	3	3	0	6	0.000	64	126	0.508	

Date	Time		Score		Set 1	Set 2	Set 3	Total	Report
29 Jun	16:00	Bansley–Wilkerson (Canada)	2–0	(Uruguay) Bausero–Rotti	21–8	21–7		42–15	Report
29 Jun	16:00	Behrens–Tillmann (Germany)	0–2	(Switzerland) Heidrich–Vergé-Dépré	17–21	11–21		28–42	Report
30 Jun	14:00	Bansley–Wilkerson (Canada)	1–2	(Switzerland) Heidrich–Vergé-Dépré	19–21	21–16	8–15	48–52	Report
30 Jun	14:00	Behrens–Tillmann (Germany)	2–0	(Uruguay) Bausero–Rotti	21–11	21–11		42–22	Report
2 Jul	14:00	Bansley–Wilkerson (Canada)	2–1	(Germany) Behrens–Tillmann	14–21	21–19	15–13	50–53	Report
2 Jul	14:00	Heidrich–Vergé-Dépré (Switzerland)	2–0	(Uruguay) Bausero–Rotti	21–15	21–12		42–27	Report

=== Pool D ===
Pos	Team	Pld	W	L	Pts	SW	SL	SR	SPW	SPL	SPR	Qualification
1	(Brazil) Ramos–Cavalcanti	3	3	0	6	6	1	6.000	140	100	1.400	Round of 32
2	(Spain) Fernández–Baquerizo	3	2	1	5	4	3	1.333	130	113	1.150	Round of 32
3	(Germany) Bieneck–Schneider	3	1	2	4	4	4	1.000	142	127	1.118	Round of 32
4	(Rwanda) Nzayisenga–Hakizimana	3	0	3	3	0	6	0.000	54	126	0.429	

Date	Time		Score		Set 1	Set 2	Set 3	Total	Report
28 Jun	17:00	Ramos–Cavalcanti (Brazil)	2–0	(Rwanda) Nzayisenga–Hakizimana	21–10	21–9		42–19	Report
28 Jun	17:00	Fernández–Baquerizo (Spain)	2–1	(Germany) Bieneck–Schneider	21–18	19–21	15–13	55–52	Report
30 Jun	18:00	Ramos–Cavalcanti (Brazil)	2–1	(Germany) Bieneck–Schneider	21–14	20–22	15–12	56–48	Report
30 Jun	18:00	Fernández–Baquerizo (Spain)	2–0	(Rwanda) Nzayisenga–Hakizimana	21–5	21–14		42–19	Report
1 Jul	13:00	Ramos–Cavalcanti (Brazil)	2–0	(Spain) Fernández–Baquerizo	21–18	21–15		42–33	Report
1 Jul	13:00	Bieneck–Schneider (Germany)	2–0	(Rwanda) Nzayisenga–Hakizimana	21–12	21–4		42–16	Report

=== Pool E ===
Pos	Team	Pld	W	L	Pts	SW	SL	SR	SPW	SPL	SPR	Qualification
1	(Germany) Borger–Sude	3	3	0	6	6	1	6.000	141	109	1.294	Round of 32
2	(United States) Klineman–A. Ross	3	2	1	5	5	2	2.500	132	93	1.419	Round of 32
3	(China) Xue–Wang X.	3	1	2	4	2	4	0.500	96	111	0.865	Lucky losers playoffs
4	(Nicaragua) Mendoza–Rodríguez	3	0	3	3	0	6	0.000	70	126	0.556	

Date	Time		Score		Set 1	Set 2	Set 3	Total	Report
29 Jun	19:00	Klineman–A. Ross (United States)	2–0	(Nicaragua) Mendoza–Rodríguez	21–8	21–7		42–15	Report
29 Jun	20:30	Borger–Sude (Germany)	2–0	(China) Xue–Wang X.	21–15	21–18		42–33	Report
30 Jun	15:00	Klineman–A. Ross (United States)	2–0	(China) Xue–Wang X.	21–10	21–11		42–21	Report
30 Jun	16:00	Borger–Sude (Germany)	2–0	(Nicaragua) Mendoza–Rodríguez	21–14	21–14		42–28	Report
1 Jul	19:00	Xue–Wang X. (China)	2–0	(Nicaragua) Mendoza–Rodríguez	21–13	21–14		42–27	Report
1 Jul	19:15	Klineman–A. Ross (United States)	1–2	(Germany) Borger–Sude	15–21	23–21	10–15	48–57	Report

=== Pool F ===
Pos	Team	Pld	W	L	Pts	SW	SL	SR	SPW	SPL	SPR	Qualification
1	(Brazil) Ágatha–Duda	3	3	0	6	6	0	MAX	126	85	1.482	Round of 32
2	(China) Xia–Wang F.	3	2	1	5	4	3	1.333	85	98	0.867	Round of 32
3	(Japan) Koshikawa–Murakami	3	1	2	4	3	4	0.750	129	133	0.970	Lucky losers playoffs
4	(Cuba) Martínez–Deliz	3	0	3	3	0	6	0.000	60	126	0.476	

Date	Time		Score		Set 1	Set 2	Set 3	Total	Report
28 Jun	12:00	Ágatha–Duda (Brazil)	2–0	(Cuba) Martínez–Deliz	21–15	21–12		42–27	Report
28 Jun	12:00	Xia–Wang F. (China)	2–1	(Japan) Koshikawa–Murakami	21–19	20–22	17–15	58–56	Report
30 Jun	10:00	Ágatha–Duda (Brazil)	2–0	(Japan) Koshikawa–Murakami	21–13	21–18		42–31	Report
30 Jun	10:00	Xia–Wang F. (China)	2–0 (forfeit)	(Cuba) Martínez–Deliz					Report
1 Jul	16:00	Ágatha–Duda (Brazil)	2–0	(China) Xia–Wang F.	21–16	21–11		42–27	Report
1 Jul	17:00	Koshikawa–Murakami (Japan)	2–0	(Cuba) Martínez–Deliz	21–17	21–16		42–33	Report

=== Pool G ===
Pos	Team	Pld	W	L	Pts	SW	SL	SR	SPW	SPL	SPR	Qualification
1	(Netherlands) Stubbe–Van Iersel	3	3	0	6	6	1	6.000	142	99	1.434	Round of 32
2	(Australia) Clancy–Artacho	3	2	1	5	4	2	2.000	128	97	1.320	Round of 32
3	(United States) Sweat–Walsh Jennings	3	1	2	4	3	4	0.750	128	104	1.231	Round of 32
4	(Mauritius) Cousin–Nathalie	3	0	3	3	0	6	0.000	28	126	0.222	

Date	Time		Score		Set 1	Set 2	Set 3	Total	Report
28 Jun	15:00	Clancy–Artacho (Australia)	2–0	(Mauritius) Cousin–Nathalie	21–5	21–6		42–11	Report
28 Jun	15:00	Sweat–Walsh Jennings (United States)	1–2	(Netherlands) Stubbe–Van Iersel	15–21	21–19	9–15	45–55	Report
30 Jun	11:00	Clancy–Artacho (Australia)	0–2	(Netherlands) Stubbe–Van Iersel	19–21	22–24		41–45	Report
30 Jun	11:00	Sweat–Walsh Jennings (United States)	2–0	(Mauritius) Cousin–Nathalie	21–2	21–2		42–4	Report
1 Jul	16:00	Stubbe–Van Iersel (Netherlands)	2–0	(Mauritius) Cousin–Nathalie	21–5	21–8		42–13	Report
1 Jul	18:00	Clancy–Artacho (Australia)	2–0	(United States) Sweat–Walsh Jennings	21–19	24–22		45–41	Report

=== Pool H ===
Pos	Team	Pld	W	L	Pts	SW	SL	SR	SPW	SPL	SPR	Qualification
1	(Netherlands) Keizer–Meppelink	3	3	0	6	6	0	MAX	126	77	1.636	Round of 32
2	(Switzerland) Betschart–Hüberli	3	2	1	5	4	2	2.000	120	99	1.212	Round of 32
3	(Australia) Laird–Palmer	3	1	2	4	2	4	0.500	104	108	0.963	Lucky losers playoffs
4	(Egypt) Radwan–Elghobashy	3	0	3	3	0	6	0.000	60	126	0.476	

Date	Time		Score		Set 1	Set 2	Set 3	Total	Report
28 Jun	19:00	Keizer–Meppelink (Netherlands)	2–0	(Egypt) Radwan–Elghobashy	21–7	21–6		42–13	Report
28 Jun	19:00	Betschart–Hüberli (Switzerland)	2–0	(Australia) Laird–Palmer	21–15	21–19		42–34	Report
30 Jun	12:00	Keizer–Meppelink (Netherlands)	2–0	(Australia) Laird–Palmer	21–16	21–12		42–28	Report
30 Jun	12:00	Betschart–Hüberli (Switzerland)	2–0	(Egypt) Radwan–Elghobashy	21–11	21–12		42–23	Report
2 Jul	11:00	Keizer–Meppelink (Netherlands)	2–0	(Switzerland) Betschart–Hüberli	21–18	21–18		42–36	Report
2 Jul	11:00	Laird–Palmer (Australia)	2–0	(Egypt) Radwan–Elghobashy	21–11	21–13		42–24	Report

=== Pool I ===
Pos	Team	Pld	W	L	Pts	SW	SL	SR	SPW	SPL	SPR	Qualification
1	(Canada) Pavan–Humana-Paredes	3	3	0	6	6	2	3.000	157	127	1.236	Round of 32
2	(United States) Sponcil–Claes	3	2	1	5	5	2	2.500	141	102	1.382	Round of 32
3	(Russia) Ukolova–Birlova	3	1	2	4	3	4	0.750	117	128	0.914	Lucky losers playoffs
4	(Colombia) Ayala–Ríos	3	0	3	3	0	6	0.000	68	126	0.540	

Date	Time		Score		Set 1	Set 2	Set 3	Total	Report
29 Jun	10:00	Pavan–Humana-Paredes (Canada)	2–0	(Colombia) Ayala–Ríos	21–6	21–13		42–19	Report
29 Jun	10:00	Sponcil–Claes (United States)	2–0	(Russia) Ukolova–Birlova	21–8	21–16		42–24	Report
30 Jun	13:00	Pavan–Humana-Paredes (Canada)	2–1	(Russia) Ukolova–Birlova	18–21	21–17	15–13	54–51	Report
30 Jun	14:00	Sponcil–Claes (United States)	2–0	(Colombia) Ayala–Ríos	21–8	21–9		42–17	Report
2 Jul	12:00	Pavan–Humana-Paredes (Canada)	2–1	(United States) Sponcil–Claes	22–24	21–17	18–16	61–57	Report
2 Jul	12:00	Ukolova–Birlova (Russia)	2–0	(Colombia) Ayala–Ríos	21–18	21–14		42–32	Report

=== Pool J ===
Pos	Team	Pld	W	L	Pts	SW	SL	SR	SPW	SPL	SPR	Qualification
1	(Germany) Kozuch–Ludwig	3	2	1	5	5	2	2.500	129	102	1.265	Round of 32
2	(Brazil) Antonelli–Carol	3	2	1	5	5	3	1.667	143	116	1.233	Round of 32
3	(United States) Larsen–Stockman	3	2	1	5	4	3	1.333	129	113	1.142	Round of 32
4	(Nigeria) Nnoruga–Ikhiede	3	0	3	3	0	6	0.000	56	126	0.444	

Date	Time		Score		Set 1	Set 2	Set 3	Total	Report
28 Jun	18:00	Antonelli–Carol (Brazil)	2–0	(Nigeria) Nnoruga–Ikhiede	21–11	21–7		42–18	Report
28 Jun	18:00	Larsen–Stockman (United States)	0–2	(Germany) Kozuch–Ludwig	19–21	15–21		34–42	Report
30 Jun	19:00	Larsen–Stockman (United States)	2–0	(Nigeria) Nnoruga–Ikhiede	21–6	21–13		42–19	Report
30 Jun	20:30	Antonelli–Carol (Brazil)	2–1	(Germany) Kozuch–Ludwig	13–21	21–13	15–11	49–45	Report
2 Jul	13:00	Antonelli–Carol (Brazil)	1–2	(United States) Larsen–Stockman	22–24	21–14	9–15	52–53	Report
2 Jul	13:00	Kozuch–Ludwig (Germany)	2–0	(Nigeria) Nnoruga–Ikhiede	21–10	21–9		42–19	Report

=== Pool K ===
Pos	Team	Pld	W	L	Pts	SW	SL	SR	SPW	SPL	SPR	Qualification
1	(Russia) Makroguzova–Kholomina	3	2	1	5	5	2	2.500	136	112	1.214	Round of 32
2	(United States) Hughes–S. Ross	3	2	1	5	4	3	1.333	128	127	1.008	Round of 32
3	(Argentina) Gallay–Pereyra	3	1	2	4	3	5	0.600	135	146	0.925	Lucky losers playoffs
4	(China) Zeng–Lin	3	1	2	4	2	4	0.500	100	114	0.877	

Date	Time		Score		Set 1	Set 2	Set 3	Total	Report
29 Jun	11:00	Hughes–S. Ross (United States)	2–1	(Argentina) Gallay–Pereyra	21–18	15–21	16–14	52–53	Report
29 Jun	11:00	Makroguzova–Kholomina (Russia)	2–0	(China) Zeng–Lin	21–15	21–11		42–26	Report
1 Jul	12:00	Hughes–S. Ross (United States)	2–0	(China) Zeng–Lin	21–19	21–13		42–32	Report
1 Jul	12:00	Makroguzova–Kholomina (Russia)	1–2	(Argentina) Gallay–Pereyra	21–15	17–21	14–16	52–52	
2 Jul	13:00	Zeng–Lin (China)	2–0	(Argentina) Gallay–Pereyra	21–12	21–18		42–30	Report
2 Jul	14:00	Hughes–S. Ross (United States)	0–2	(Russia) Makroguzova–Kholomina	16–21	18–21		34–42	Report

=== Pool L ===
Pos	Team	Pld	W	L	Pts	SW	SL	SR	SPW	SPL	SPR	Qualification
1	(Brazil) Bárbara–Fernanda	3	3	0	6	6	0	MAX	126	86	1.465	Round of 32
2	(Slovakia) Štrbová–Dubovcová	3	2	1	5	4	2	2.000	112	97	1.155	Round of 32
3	(Finland) Lahti-Liukkonen–Parkkinen	3	1	2	4	2	4	0.500	104	104	1.000	Lucky losers playoffs
4	(Mexico) Revuelta–Orellana	3	0	3	3	0	6	0.000	71	126	0.563	

Date	Time		Score		Set 1	Set 2	Set 3	Total	Report
28 Jun	11:00	Bárbara–Fernanda (Brazil)	2–0	(Mexico) Revuelta–Orellana	21–14	21–12		42–26	Report
28 Jun	11:00	Lahti-Liukkonen–Parkkinen (Finland)	0–2	(Slovakia) Štrbová–Dubovcová	19–21	11–21		30–42	Report
1 Jul	15:00	Bárbara–Fernanda (Brazil)	2–0	(Slovakia) Štrbová–Dubovcová	21–15	21–13		42–28	Report
1 Jul	16:00	Lahti-Liukkonen–Parkkinen (Finland)	2–0	(Mexico) Revuelta–Orellana	21–11	21–9		42–20	Report
2 Jul	10:00	Bárbara–Fernanda (Brazil)	2–0	(Finland) Lahti-Liukkonen–Parkkinen	21–15	21–17		42–32	Report
2 Jul	10:00	Štrbová–Dubovcová (Slovakia)	2–0	(Mexico) Revuelta–Orellana	21–16	21–9		42–25	Report

=== Ranking of the third place teams ===
The four best third-placed teams advanced directly to the round of 32. The other eight third-placed teams played in the lucky losers playoffs for the additional four spots in the Round of 32.

Pos	Team	Pld	W	L	Pts	SW	SL	SR	SPW	SPL	SPR
1	(United States) Larsen–Stockman	3	2	1	5	4	3	1.333	129	113	1.142
2	(Germany) Bieneck–Schneider	3	1	2	4	4	4	1.000	142	127	1.118
3	(United States) Sweat–Walsh Jennings	3	1	2	4	3	4	0.750	128	104	1.231
4	(Germany) Behrens–Tillmann	3	1	2	4	3	4	0.750	123	114	1.079
5	(Japan) Koshikawa–Murakami	3	1	2	4	3	4	0.750	129	133	0.970
6	(Russia) Ukolova–Birlova	3	1	2	4	3	4	0.750	117	128	0.914
7	(Argentina) Gallay–Pereyra	3	1	2	4	3	5	0.600	135	146	0.925
8	(Germany) Körtzinger–Schneider	3	1	2	4	3	5	0.600	124	147	0.844
9	(Canada) M. McNamara–N. McNamara	3	1	2	4	2	4	0.500	118	116	1.017
10	(Finland) Lahti-Liukkonen–Parkkinen	3	1	2	4	2	4	0.500	104	104	1.000
11	(Australia) Laird–Palmer	3	1	2	4	2	4	0.500	104	108	0.963
12	(China) Xue–Wang X.	3	1	2	4	2	4	0.500	96	111	0.865

== Lucky losers playoffs ==
Date	Time		Score		Set 1	Set 2	Set 3	Total	Report
2 Jul	19:00	Koshikawa–Murakami (Japan)	0–2	(China) Xue–Wang X.	15–21	10–21		25–42	Report
2 Jul	19:00	Ukolova–Birlova (Russia)	2–1	(Australia) Laird–Palmer	19–21	21–13	15–13	55–47	Report
2 Jul	19:15	Gallay–Pereyra (Argentina)	2–1	(Finland) Lahti-Liukkonen–Parkkinen	21–17	13–21	15–13	49–51	Report
2 Jul	20:30	Körtzinger–Schneider (Germany)	2–0	(Canada) M. McNamara–N. McNamara	21–19	21–16		42–35	Report

== Knockout stage ==
=== Bracket ===
Round of 32
3 July
Menegatti–Toth (ITA)	2
Gallay–Pereyra (ARG)	1
3 July
Ittlinger–Laboureur (GER)	1
Sponcil–Claes (USA)	2
3 July
Pavan–Humana-Paredes (CAN)	2
Xia–Wang F. (CHN)	0
3 July
Larsen–Stockman (USA)	1
Keizer–Meppelink (NED)	2
3 July
Borger–Sude (GER)	2
Behrens–Tillmann (GER)	1
3 July
Plesiutschnig–Schützenhöfer (AUT)	0
Bárbara–Fernanda (BRA)	2
3 July
Betschart–Hüberli (SUI)	2
Štrbová–Dubovcová (SVK)	1
3 July
Xue–Wang X. (CHN)	0
Ramos–Cavalcanti (BRA)	2
3 July
Heidrich–Vergé-Dépré (SUI)	2
Körtzinger–Schneider (GER)	1
3 July
Clancy–Artacho (AUS)	2
Bansley–Wilkerson (CAN)	0
3 July
Makroguzova–Kholomina (RUS)	2
Fernández–Baquerizo (ESP)	0
3 July
Sweat–Walsh Jennings (USA)	0
Ágatha–Duda (BRA)	2
3 July
Stubbe–Van Iersel (NED)	2
Bieneck–Schneider (GER)	0
3 July
Hughes–S. Ross (USA)	2
Kozuch–Ludwig (GER)	0
3 July
Klineman–A. Ross (USA)	2
Antonelli–Carol (BRA)	1
3 July
Ukolova–Birlova (RUS)	0
Graudina–Kravčenoka (LAT)	2

Round of 16
4 July
Menegatti–Toth (ITA)	2
Sponcil–Claes (USA)	0
4 July
Pavan–Humana-Paredes (CAN)	2
Keizer–Meppelink (NED)	1
4 July
Borger–Sude (GER)	1
Bárbara–Fernanda (BRA)	2
4 July
Betschart–Hüberli (SUI)	2
Ramos–Cavalcanti (BRA)	1
4 July
Heidrich–Vergé-Dépré (SUI)	1
Clancy–Artacho (AUS)	2
4 July
Makroguzova–Kholomina (RUS)	2
Ágatha–Duda (BRA)	1
4 July
Stubbe–Van Iersel (NED)	0
Hughes–S. Ross (USA)	2
4 July
Klineman–A. Ross (USA)	2
Graudina–Kravčenoka (LAT)	0

Quarter-finals
5 July
Menegatti–Toth (ITA)	0
Pavan–Humana-Paredes (CAN)	2
5 July
Bárbara–Fernanda (BRA)	1
Betschart–Hüberli (SUI)	2
5 July
Clancy–Artacho (AUS)	2
Makroguzova–Kholomina (RUS)	0
5 July
Hughes–S. Ross (USA)	0
Klineman–A. Ross (USA)	2

Semi-finals
5 July
Pavan–Humana-Paredes (CAN)	2
Betschart–Hüberli (SUI)	1
5 July
Clancy–Artacho (AUS)	0
Klineman–A. Ross (USA)	2

Final
6 July
Pavan–Humana-Paredes (CAN)	2
Klineman–A. Ross (USA)	0
Bronze medal match
6 July
Betschart–Hüberli (SUI)	0
Clancy–Artacho (AUS)	2

=== Round of 32 ===
Date	Time		Score		Set 1	Set 2	Set 3	Total	Report
3 Jul	12:00	Pavan–Humana-Paredes (Canada)	2–0	(China) Xia–Wang F.	21–18	21–13		42–31	Report
3 Jul	13:00	Larsen–Stockman (United States)	1–2	(Netherlands) Keizer–Meppelink	17–21	21–13	13–15	51–49	Report
3 Jul	14:00	Plesiutschnig–Schützenhöfer (Austria)	0–2	(Brazil) Bárbara–Fernanda	16–21	16–21		32–42	Report
3 Jul	14:00	Betschart–Hüberli (Switzerland)	2–1	(Slovakia) Štrbová–Dubovcová	16–21	21–16	16–14	53–51	Report
3 Jul	15:00	Borger–Sude (Germany)	2–1	(Germany) Behrens–Tillmann	19–21	21–17	15–13	55–51	Report
3 Jul	15:00	Clancy–Artacho (Australia)	2–0	(Canada) Bansley–Wilkerson	21–15	21–19		42–34	Report
3 Jul	15:00	Xue–Wang X. (China)	0–2	(Brazil) Ramos–Cavalcanti	11–21	13–21		24–42	Report
3 Jul	16:00	Ittlinger–Laboureur (Germany)	1–2	(United States) Sponcil–Claes	21–19	19–21	10–15	50–55	Report
3 Jul	16:00	Menegatti–Toth (Italy)	2–1	(Argentina) Gallay–Pereyra	24–26	21–17	16–14	61–57	Report
3 Jul	16:00	Heidrich–Vergé-Dépré (Switzerland)	2–1	(Germany) Körtzinger–Schneider	24–22	19–21	16–14	59–57	Report
3 Jul	17:00	Stubbe–Van Iersel (Netherlands)	2–0	(Germany) Bieneck–Schneider	21–19	21–12		42–31	Report
3 Jul	17:00	Hughes–S. Ross (United States)	2–0	(Germany) Kozuch–Ludwig	21–15	21–12		42–27	Report
3 Jul	17:00	Ukolova–Birlova (Russia)	0–2	(Latvia) Graudina–Kravčenoka	20–22	19–21		39–43	Report
3 Jul	18:00	Makroguzova–Kholomina (Russia)	2–0	(Spain) Fernández–Baquerizo	21–18	21–17		42–35	Report
3 Jul	18:00	Sweat–Walsh Jennings (United States)	0–2	(Brazil) Ágatha–Duda	18–21	16–21		34–42	Report
3 Jul	18:00	Klineman–A. Ross (United States)	2–1	(Brazil) Antonelli–Carol	21–15	13–21	15–11	49–47	Report

=== Round of 16 ===
Date	Time		Score		Set 1	Set 2	Set 3	Total	Report
4 Jul	13:00	Stubbe–Van Iersel (Netherlands)	0–2	(United States) Hughes–S. Ross	14–21	19–21		33–42	Report
4 Jul	13:00	Klineman–A. Ross (United States)	2–0	(Latvia) Graudina–Kravčenoka	21–11	21–18		42–29	Report
4 Jul	14:00	Heidrich–Vergé-Dépré (Switzerland)	1–2	(Australia) Clancy–Artacho	16–21	23–21	9–15	48–57	Report
4 Jul	14:00	Makroguzova–Kholomina (Russia)	2–1	(Brazil) Ágatha–Duda	22–20	18–21	22–20	62–61	Report
4 Jul	16:00	Menegatti–Toth (Italy)	2–0	(United States) Sponcil–Claes	26–24	21–16		47–40	Report
4 Jul	16:00	Pavan–Humana-Paredes (Canada)	2–1	(Netherlands) Keizer–Meppelink	21–18	18–21	15–9	54–48	Report
4 Jul	18:00	Betschart–Hüberli (Switzerland)	2–1	(Brazil) Ramos–Cavalcanti	19–21	21–15	15–12	55–48	Report
4 Jul	20:30	Borger–Sude (Germany)	1–2	(Brazil) Bárbara–Fernanda	21–10	17–21	11–15	49–46	Report

=== Quarterfinals ===
Date	Time		Score		Set 1	Set 2	Set 3	Total	Report
5 Jul	11:15	Menegatti–Toth (Italy)	0–2	(Canada) Pavan–Humana-Paredes	12–21	12–21		24–42	Report
5 Jul	11:15	Clancy–Artacho (Australia)	2–0	(Russia) Makroguzova–Kholomina	24–22	21–14		45–36	Report
5 Jul	12:30	Bárbara–Fernanda (Brazil)	1–2	(Switzerland) Betschart–Hüberli	21–19	13–21	13–15	47–55	Report
5 Jul	12:30	Hughes–S. Ross (United States)	0–2	(United States) Klineman–A. Ross	18–21	14–21		32–42	Report

=== Semifinals ===
Date	Time		Score		Set 1	Set 2	Set 3	Total	Report
5 Jul	19:15	Clancy–Artacho (Australia)	0–2	(United States) Klineman–A. Ross	15–21	18–21		33–42	Report
5 Jul	20:30	Pavan–Humana-Paredes (Canada)	2–1	(Switzerland) Betschart–Hüberli	23–21	17–21	19–17	59–59	Report

=== Bronze medal game ===
Date	Time		Score		Set 1	Set 2	Set 3	Total	Report
6 Jul	13:00	Betschart–Hüberli (Switzerland)	0–2	(Australia) Clancy–Artacho	18–21	20–22		38–43	Report

=== Final ===
Date	Time		Score		Set 1	Set 2	Set 3	Total	Report
6 Jul	15:15	Pavan–Humana-Paredes (Canada)	2–0	(United States) Klineman–A. Ross	23–21	23–21		46–42	Report

== See also ==
- 2019 Beach Volleyball World Championships – Men's tournament
