= 2018 AVP Pro Beach Volleyball Tour =

- League: Association of Volleyball Professionals
- Sport: Beach volleyball
- Duration: May 1 – September 16, 2018
- TV partner(s): NBC; NBCSN; Amazon Prime

Seasons
- ← 2017 2019 →

The 2018 AVP Pro Beach Volleyball Tour is a domestic professional beach volleyball circuit organized in the United States by the Association of Volleyball Professionals (AVP) for the 2018 beach volleyball season. The 2018 AVP Tour calendar comprises a joint AVP-FIVB tournament, the "Gold Series" tournaments and the "Open" tournaments.

== Schedule ==
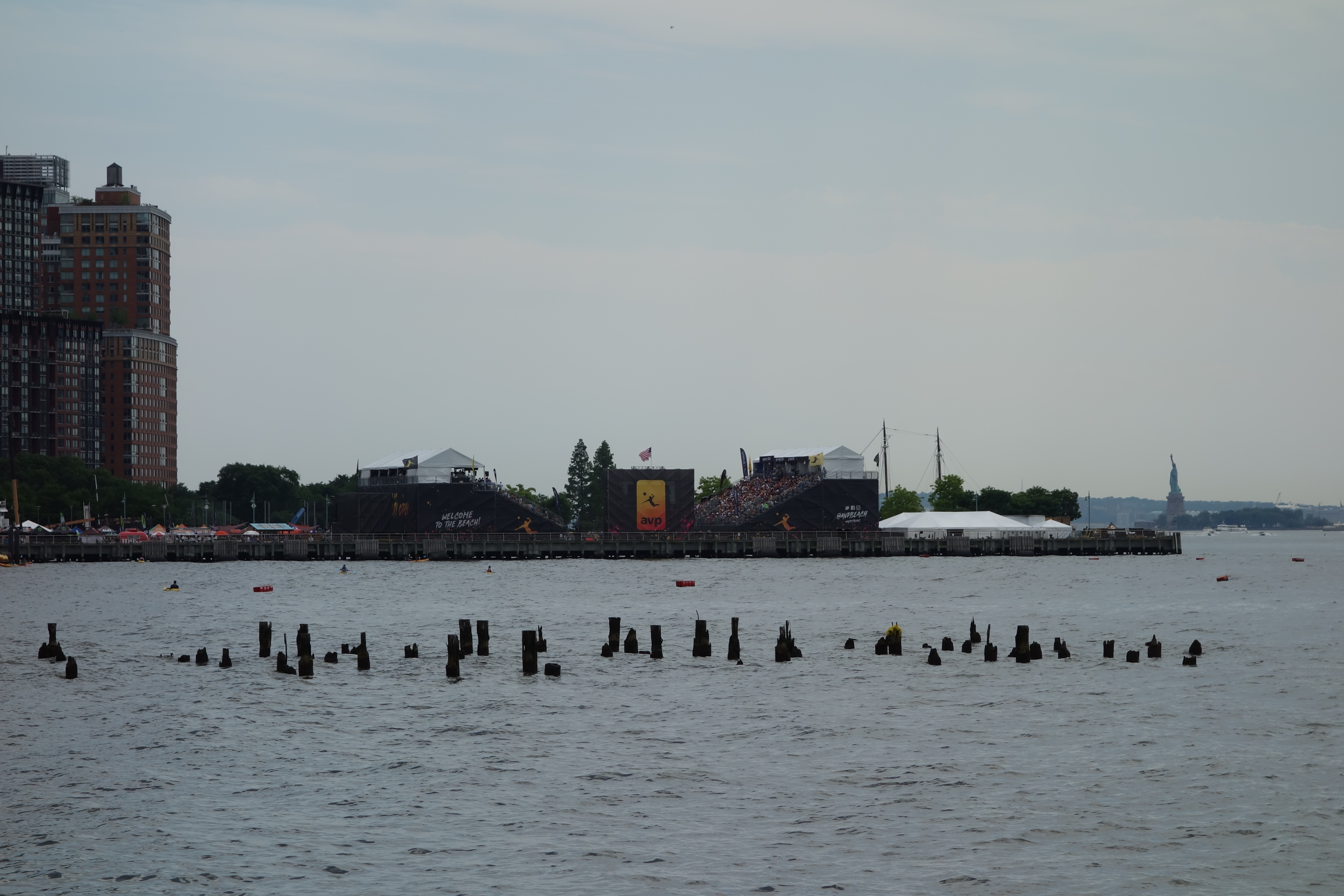
The 2018 New York City Open in Hudson River Park, Manhattan.

This is the complete schedule of events on the 2018 calendar, with team progression documented from the semifinals stage. All tournaments consisted of single-elimination qualifying rounds followed by a double-elimination main draw.

Key

FIVB tournament
Gold Series

=== Men ===
Tournament	Champions	Runners-up	Semifinalist #1	Semifinalist #2
FIVB Huntington Beach Open; Huntington Beach, California; US$150,000; May 1–6	Alexander Brouwer (NED); Robert Meeuwsen (NED); 21-16, 21-15 (0:36)	Evandro Oliveira (BRA); André Stein (BRA)	Adrian Gavira (ESP); Pablo Herrera (ESP)	Aleksandrs Samoilovs (LAT); Janis Smedins (LAT)
Austin Open; Austin, Texas; US$75,000; May 17–20	Phil Dalhausser (USA); Nick Lucena (USA); 21-14, 21-14 (0:40)	Tim Bomgren (USA); Taylor Crabb (USA)	Casey Patterson (USA); Stafford Slick (USA)	Jeremy Casebeer (USA); Reid Priddy (USA)
New York City Open; New York City, New York; US$100,000; Gold Series; June 7–10	Phil Dalhausser (USA); Nick Lucena (USA); 21-16, 21-17 (0:48)	Jake Gibb (USA); Taylor Crabb (USA)	Theo Brunner (USA); John Hyden (USA)	Billy Allen (USA); Ryan Doherty (USA)
Seattle Open; Seattle, Washington; US$75,000; June 21–24	Taylor Crabb (USA); Jake Gibb (USA); 21-16, 21-19 (0:51)	Phil Dalhausser (USA); Nick Lucena (USA)	Theo Brunner (USA); John Hyden (USA)	Jeremy Casebeer (USA); Reid Priddy (USA)
San Francisco Open; San Francisco, California; US$75,000; July 5–8	Ed Ratledge (USA); Roberto Rodriguez (PUR); 21-15, 21-18 (0:41)	Chase Budinger (USA); Sean Rosenthal (USA)	Billy Allen (USA); Ryan Doherty (USA)	Tim Bomgren (USA); Chaim Schalk (USA)
Hermosa Beach Open; Hermosa Beach, California; US$79,000; July 26–29	Theo Brunner (USA); John Hyden (USA); 21-19, 16–21, 16-14 (1:00)	Billy Allen (USA); Ryan Doherty (USA)	Taylor Crabb (USA); Jake Gibb (USA)	Ed Ratledge (USA); Roberto Rodriguez (PUR)
Manhattan Beach Open; Manhattan Beach, California; US$125,000; Gold Series; August 16–19	Phil Dalhausser (USA); Nick Lucena (USA); 12-21, 22–20, 15-13 (1:15)	Taylor Crabb (USA); Jake Gibb (USA)	Theo Brunner (USA); John Hyden (USA)	Jeremy Casebeer (USA); Reid Priddy (USA)
Championships; Chicago, Illinois; US$125,000; Gold Series; August 30 – September 2	Taylor Crabb (USA); Jake Gibb (USA); 21-14, 21-17 (0:45)	Tim Bomgren (USA); Chaim Schalk (USA)	Jeremy Casebeer (USA); Reid Priddy (USA)	Ed Ratledge (USA); Roberto Rodriguez (PUR)
Hawaii Invitational; Waikiki, Hawaii; US$75,000; September 15–16	Phil Dalhausser (USA); Nick Lucena (USA); 21-16, 27-25 (1:07)	Alexander Brouwer (NED); Robert Meeuwsen (NED)	Saymon Barbosa (BRA); Gustavo Carvalhaes (BRA)	Tri Bourne (USA); Trevor Crabb (USA)

=== Women ===
Tournament	Champions	Runners-up	Semifinalist #1	Semifinalist #2
FIVB Huntington Beach Open; Huntington Beach, California; US$150,000; May 1–6	Fernanda Alves (BRA); Barbara Seixas (BRA); 16-21, 21–15, 15-9 (0:53)	Maria Elisa Antonelli (BRA); Carolina Salgado (BRA)	Chantal Laboureur (GER); Julia Sude (GER)	Melissa Humana-Paredes (CAN); Sarah Pavan (CAN)
Austin Open; Austin, Texas; US$75,000; May 17–20	Alix Klineman (USA); April Ross (USA); 24-22, 25-23 (1:10)	Lauren Fendrick (USA); Sarah Sponcil (USA)	Lane Carico (USA); Karolina Marciniak (POL)	Karissa Cook (USA); Katie Spieler (USA)
New York City Open; New York City, New York; US$100,000; Gold Series; June 7–10	Sara Hughes (USA); Summer Ross (USA); 21-14, 21-19 (0:52)	Nicole Branagh (USA); Brandie Wilkerson (CAN)	Kelly Claes (USA); Brittany Hochevar (USA)	Alix Klineman (USA); April Ross (USA)
Seattle Open; Seattle, Washington; US$75,000; June 21–24	Emily Day (USA); Betsi Flint (USA); 19-21, 21–19, 18-16 (1:17)	Caitlin Ledoux (USA); April Ross (USA)	Kelly Claes (USA); Brittany Hochevar (USA)	Amanda Dowdy (USA); Irene Pollock (USA)
San Francisco Open; San Francisco, California; US$75,000; July 5–8	Emily Day (USA); Betsi Flint (USA); 21-17, 16–21, 15-7 (1:00)	Caitlin Ledoux (USA); Geena Urango (USA)	Alix Klineman (USA); April Ross (USA)	Brittany Howard (USA); Kelly Reeves (USA)
Hermosa Beach Open; Hermosa Beach, California; US$79,000; July 26–29	Sara Hughes (USA); Summer Ross (USA); 19-21, 21–19, 17-15 (1:28)	Alix Klineman (USA); April Ross (USA)	Kelly Claes (USA); Brittany Hochevar (USA)	Caitlin Ledoux (USA); Geena Urango (USA)
Manhattan Beach Open; Manhattan Beach, California; US$125,000; Gold Series; August 16–19	Alix Klineman (USA); April Ross (USA); 27-25, 17–21, 17-15 (1:25)	Kelly Claes (USA); Brittany Hochevar (USA)	Emily Day (USA); Betsi Flint (USA)	Kelley Larsen (USA); Emily Stockman (USA)
Championships; Chicago, Illinois; US$125,000; Gold Series; August 30 – September 2	Alix Klineman (USA); April Ross (USA); 25-23, 21-16 (0:54)	Sara Hughes (USA); Summer Ross (USA)	Kelly Claes (USA); Brittany Hochevar (USA)	Terese Cannon (USA); Sarah Sponcil (USA)
Hawaii Invitational; Waikiki, Hawaii; US$75,000; September 15–16	Alix Klineman (USA); April Ross (USA); 18-21, 21–19, 15-10 (0:59)	Sara Hughes (USA); Summer Ross (USA)	Ágatha Bednarczuk (BRA); Eduarda Santos Lisboa (BRA)	Kelly Claes (USA); Brittany Hochevar (USA)

== Milestones and events ==
Miscellaneous

- AVP and Amazon signed an agreement to livestream almost every match from every AVP tournament on Amazon Prime for the next three seasons, starting with the 2018 season.

== Points distribution ==
Finish	US$150,000 tournaments	US$175,000 tournaments	US$200,000 tournaments	US$225,000 tournaments	US$300,000 tournaments
1	750	900	1050	1200	1650
2	640	768	896	1024	1408
3	540	648	756	864	1188
5	450	540	630	720	990
7	370	444	518	592	814
9	300	360	420	480	660
13	240	288	336	384	528
15	210	252	294	336	462
17	190	228	266	304	418
19	170	204	238	272	374
21	150	180	210	240	330
25	120	144	168	192	264
-1	100	120	140	160	220
-2	82	98	114	130	180
-3	66	78	92	106	144
-4	52	62	72	82	114

== Awards ==
The 2018 AVP Awards Banquet was held on November 15 in Newport Beach, California. The season's top performers were chosen based on statistics, player votes and AVP national ranking points earned during the year.

Award	Men	Women
Best blocker	Phil Dalhausser (USA)	Alix Klineman (USA)
Best server	Jeremy Casebeer (USA)	Geena Urango (USA)
Best defender	Taylor Crabb (USA)	Sara Hughes (USA)
Best Offensive Player	Phil Dalhausser (USA)	April Ross (USA)
Most Improved Player	Ed Ratledge (USA)	Alix Klineman (USA)
Rookie of the Year	Chase Budinger (USA)	Brittany Howard (USA)
Most valuable player	Taylor Crabb (USA)	April Ross (USA)
Team of the Year	Jake Gibb (USA); Taylor Crabb (USA)	Alix Klineman (USA); April Ross (USA)
