= FIVB Beach Volleyball U21 World Championships =

International under 21 championship

- Sport: Beach Volleyball
- Founded: 2001; 25 years ago
- First season: 2001
- Continent: International (FIVB)
- Website: volleyballworld.com

The FIVB Beach Volleyball U21 World Championship is a double-gender international beach volleyball tournament for athletes under the age of 21. The competition first took place in Le Lavandou, France in 2001.

== Results summary ==
=== Men's tournament ===
FIVB Men's U21 World Championship
Year	Host	Champions	Runners-up	Third place	Fourth place
2001; Details	(France); Le Lavandou	Anselmo Sigoli (BRA); Pedro Cunha (BRA)	Raúl Mesa (ESP); Pablo Herrera (ESP)	Alexei Verbov (RUS); Anton Koulinovski (RUS)	Francesco Tabarini (SMR); Alfredo Tabarini (SMR)
2002; Details	(Italy); Catania	Raúl Mesa (ESP); Pablo Herrera (ESP)	Pedro Cunha (BRA); Adriano Fonseca (BRA)	Matthias Karger (GER); Maarten Lammens (GER)	Andreas Gortsianouk (GRE); Georgios Knapek (GRE)
2003; Details	(France); Saint-Quay-Portrieux	Pedro Solberg (BRA); Pedro Cunha (BRA)	Daniel Krug (GER); Mischa Urbatzka (GER)	Pavel Rotrekl (CZE); Pavel Kolar (CZE)	Gregóire Capitaine (FRA); Damien Quoirin (FRA)
2004; Details	(Portugal); Porto Santo	Inocencio Lario (ESP); Miguel Ángel de Amo (ESP)	Toms Smedins (LAT); Valter Rammas (LAT)	Pedro Solberg (BRA); Moisés Santos (BRA)	Tom Götz (GER); Stefan Uhmann (GER)
2005; Details	(Brazil); Rio de Janeiro	Mārtiņš Pļaviņš (LAT); Aleksandrs Samoilovs (LAT)	Jackson Henriquez (VEN); Jesús Villafañe (VEN)	Sergey Prokopyev (RUS); Yaroslav Koshkarev (RUS)	Pedro Solberg (BRA); Tiago Santos (BRA)
2006; Details	(Poland); Myslowice	Pedro Solberg (BRA); Bruno Oscar Schmidt (BRA)	Tomasz Scinczak (POL); Rafal Szternel (POL)	Piotr Marciniak (POL); Krzysztof Orman (POL)	Jānis Šmēdiņš (LAT); Toms Šmēdiņš (LAT)
2007; Details	(Italy); Modena	Francesco Giontella (ITA); Paolo Nicolai (ITA)	Alejandro Fernández (ESP); Adrián Gavira (ESP)	Jonathan Edrmann (GER); Stefan Windscheif (GER)	Marco Daalmeijer (NED); Tim Oude Elferink (NED)
2008; Details	(United Kingdom); Brighton	Francesco Giontella (ITA); Paolo Nicolai (ITA)	Alexander Brouwer (NED); Christiaan Varenhorst (NED)	Matteo Ingrosso (ITA); Paolo Ingrosso (ITA)	Matthias Penk (GER); Alexander Walkenhorst (GER)
2009; Details	(United Kingdom); Blackpool	Michal Kadziola (POL); Jakub Szalankiewicz (POL)	Vitor Felipe (BRA); Álvaro Morais Filho (BRA)	Sergey Kostyukhin (RUS); Alexey Pastukhov (RUS)	Armin Dollinger (GER); Malte Stiel (GER)
2010; Details	(Turkey); Alanya	Garrett May (CAN); Sam Schachter (CAN)	Vitor Felipe (BRA); Álvaro Morais Filho (BRA)	Peter Eglseer (AUT); Felix Koraimann (AUT)	Andrey Bolgov (RUS); Ruslan Bykanov (RUS)
2011; Details	(Canada); Halifax	Sergiy Popov (UKR); Valeriy Samoday (UKR)	Piotr Kantor (POL); Bartosz Łosiak (POL)	Marcus Carvalhaes (BRA); Vitor Felipe (BRA)	Danny Demyanenko (CAN); Garrett May (CAN)
2012; Details	(Canada); Halifax	Piotr Kantor (POL); Bartosz Łosiak (POL)	Mirco Gerson (SUI); Gabriel Kissling (SUI)	Fabian Schmidt (GER); Dominic Stork (GER)	Andrey Bolgov (RUS); Artem Kucharenko (RUS)
2013; Details	(Croatia); Umag	Gustavo Carvalhaes (BRA); Allison Cittadin (BRA)	Aaron Nusbaum (CAN); Grant O'Gorman (CAN)	Maciej Kosiak (POL); Maciej Rudol (POL)	Viacheslav Kirienko (RUS); Dmitry Uraikin (RUS)
2014; Details	(Cyprus); Larnaca	Michał Bryl (POL); Kacper Kujawiak (POL)	Ilya Leshukov (RUS); Aleksander Margievk (RUS)	Romain Di Giantommaso (FRA); Maxime Thiercy (FRA)	Hendrik Mol (NOR); Christian Sørum (NOR)
2016; Details	(Switzerland); Lucerne	George Wanderley (BRA); Arthur Lanci (BRA)	Josué Gaxiola (MEX); José Luis Rubio (MEX)	Tigrito Gómez (VEN); Peter Hernández (VEN)	Anders Mol (NOR); Mathias Berntsen (NOR)
2017; Details	(China); Nanjing	Adrielson Silva (BRA); Renato Carvalho (BRA)	Aleksandr Kramarenko (RUS); Vasilii Ivanov (RUS)	Kristaps Smits (LAT); Mihails Samoilovs (LAT)	Moritz Kindl (AUT); Marian Klaffinger (AUT)
2019; Details	(Thailand); Udon Thani	Renato Carvalho (BRA); Rafael Carvalho (BRA)	Jakob Windisch (ITA); Alberto Di Silvestre (ITA)	Miguel Sarabia (MEX); Raymond Stephens (MEX)	Vasilii Ivanov (RUS); Sergey Gorbenko (RUS)
2021; Details	(Thailand); Phuket	David Åhman (SWE); Jonatan Hellvig (SWE)	Gianluca Dal Corso (ITA); Marco Viscovich (ITA)	Dmitrii Veretiuk (RUS); Aleksei Arkhipov (RUS)	Jakub Šépka (CZE); Tomáš Semerád (CZE)
2023; Details	(Thailand); Roi Et	Joppe van Langendonck (BEL); Kyan Vercauteren (BEL)	Timo Hammarberg (AUT); Tim Berger (AUT)	Arthur Canet (FRA); Téo Rotar (FRA)	Pedro Augusto Sousa (BRA); Henrique Camboim (BRA)
2025; Details	(Mexico); Puebla	Gustavs Auziņš (LAT); Kristians Fokerots (LAT)	Szymon Beta (POL); Artem Besarab (POL)	Inés Vargas (MEX); Carlos Ayala (MEX)	Szymon Pietraszek (POL); Jakub Krzemiński (POL)

=== Women's tournament ===
FIVB Women's U21 World Championship
Year	Host	Champions	Runners-up	Third place	Fourth place
2001; Details	(France); Le Lavandou	Shaylyn Bede (BRA); Maria Clara Salgado (BRA)	Anna Morozova (RUS); Anna Bobrova (RUS)	Katerina Tychnova (CZE); Marketa Tychnova (CZE)	Jeaqueline Alvares (MEX); Norma Perez (MEX)
2002; Details	(Italy); Catania	Taiana Lima (BRA); Juliana Silva (BRA)	Isabelle Forrer (SUI); Melanie Schonenberger (SUI)	Maria Clara Salgado (BRA); Talita Rocha (BRA)	Vassiliki Arvaniti (GRE); Efthalia Koutroumanidou (GRE)
2003; Details	(France); Saint-Quay-Portrieux	Anna Morozova (RUS); Alexandra Shyriaeva (RUS)	Maria Kleefisch (GER); Katrin Holtwick (GER)	Maria Clara Salgado (BRA); Carolina Solberg Salgado (BRA)	Melanie Schonenberger (SUI); Tanya Schmocker (SUI)
2004; Details	(Portugal); Porto Santo	Carolina Solberg Salgado (BRA); Taiana Lima (BRA)	Marion Castelli (FRA); Eva Hamzaoui (FRA)	Sarka Nakladalova (CZE); Veronika Opravilova (CZE)	Marleen van Iersel (NED); Arjanne Stevens (NED)
2005; Details	(Brazil); Rio de Janeiro	Carolina Solberg Salgado (BRA); Camila Saldanha (BRA)	Ruth Fleming (GER); Ilka Semmler (GER)	Stefanie Schwaiger (AUT); Doris Schwaiger (AUT)	Nadine Zumkehr (SUI); Muriel Graessli (SUI)
2006; Details	(Poland); Myslowice	Carolina Aragão (BRA); Bárbara Seixas (BRA)	Jana Köhler (GER); Julia Sude (GER)	Marleen van Iersel (NED); Marloes Wesselink (NED)	Julia Caldas (BRA); Carolina Solberg Salgado (BRA)
2007; Details	(Italy); Modena	Liliane Maestrini (BRA); Bárbara Seixas (BRA)	Becchara Palmer (AUS); Alice Rohkamper (AUS)	Marleen van Iersel (NED); Marloes Wesselink (NED)	Elsa Baquerizo (ESP); Liliana Fernández (ESP)
2008; Details	(United Kingdom); Brighton	Daniëlle Remmers (NED); Marleen van Iersel (NED)	Michelle Stiekema (NED); Sophie van Gestel (NED)	Monika Brzostek (POL); Karolina Sowala (POL)	Tanja Goricanec (SUI); Taryn Sciarini (SUI)
2009; Details	(United Kingdom); Blackpool	Monika Brzostek (POL); Kinga Kołosińska (POL)	Daniëlle Remmers (NED); Michelle Stiekema (NED)	Irina Chaika (RUS); Anna Vozakova (RUS)	Martina Bonnerová (CZE); Barbora Hermannová (CZE)
2010; Details	(Turkey); Alanya	Tara Roenicke (USA); Summer Ross (USA)	Marta Menegatti (ITA); Viktoria Orsi Toth (ITA)	Fabiane Boogaerdt (BRA); Julia Schmidt (BRA)	Victoria Bieneck (GER); Chantal Laboureur (GER)
2011; Details	(Canada); Halifax	Nina Betschart (SUI); Joana Heidrich (SUI)	Victoria Altomare (CAN); Melissa Humana-Paredes (CAN)	Rimke Braakman (NED); Sophie van Gestel (NED)	Renata Bekier (POL); Daria Paszek (POL)
2012; Details	(Canada); Halifax	Nina Betschart (SUI); Anouk Vergé-Dépré (SUI)	Rebecca Cavalcante (BRA); Drussyla Costa (BRA)	Mariafe Artacho (AUS); Taliqua Clancy (AUS)	Sara Hughes (USA); Summer Ross (USA)
2013; Details	(Croatia); Umag	Jagoda Gruszczynska (POL); Katarzyna Kociolek (POL)	Anika Krebs (GER); Jelena Wlk (GER)	Lena Plesiutschnig (AUT); Katharina Schützenhöfer (AUT)	Raquel Brun (ESP); Paula Soria (ESP)
2014; Details	(Cyprus); Larnaca	Sophie Bukovec (CAN); Tiadora Miric (CAN)	Ieva Dumbauskaitė (LIT); Monika Povilaitytė (LIT)	Kelly Claes (USA); Sara Hughes (USA)	Nina Betschart (SUI); Nicole Eiholzer (SUI)
2016; Details	(Switzerland); Lucerne	Eduarda Santos Lisboa (BRA); Ana Patrícia Ramos (BRA)	Nadezda Makroguzova (RUS); Svetlana Kholomina (RUS)	Megan McNamara (CAN); Nicole McNamara (CAN)	Sarah Sponcil (USA); Torrey Van Winden (USA)
2017; Details	(China); Nanjing	Eduarda Santos Lisboa (BRA); Ana Patrícia Ramos (BRA)	Nadezda Makroguzova (RUS); Svetlana Kholomina (RUS)	Milica Mirkovic (USA); Kathryn Plummer (USA)	Gaia Traballi (ITA); Ester Maestroni (ITA)
2019; Details	(Thailand); Udon Thani	Victoria Tosta (BRA); Vitoria Rodrigues (BRA)	Maria Voronina (RUS); Maria Bocharova (RUS)	Daniela Álvarez (ESP); María Belén Carro (ESP)	Svenja Müller (GER); Sarah Schulz (GER)
2021; Details	(Thailand); Phuket	Anhelina Khmil (UKR); Tetiana Lazarenko (UKR)	Daniela Álvarez (ESP); Sofía González (ESP)	Menia Bentele (SUI); Leona Kernen (SUI)	Varvara Brailko (LAT); Anete Namiķe (LAT)
2023; Details	(Thailand); Roi Et	Desy Poiesz (NED); Brecht Piersma (NED)	Leona Kernen (SUI); Annique Niederhauser (SUI)	Małgorzata Ciężkowska (POL); Urszula Łunio (POL)	Yan Xu (CHN); Zhou Mingli (CHN)
2025; Details	(Mexico); Puebla	Sally Perez (USA); Avery Jackson (USA)	Zoey Henson (USA); Sarah Wood (USA)	Marcela Mattoso (BRA); Maria Clara Costa (BRA)	Małgorzata Ciężkowska (POL); Urszula Łunio (POL)

== Medals table ==
=== Men ===
Rank	Nation	Gold	Silver	Bronze	Total
1	Brazil	7	3	2	12
2	Poland	3	3	2	8
3	Italy	2	2	1	5
4	Spain	2	2	0	4
5	Latvia	2	1	1	4
6	Canada	1	1	0	2
7	Belgium	1	0	0	1
7	Sweden	1	0	0	1
7	Ukraine	1	0	0	1
10	Russia	0	2	4	6
11	Germany	0	1	3	4
12	Mexico	0	1	2	3
13	Austria	0	1	1	2
13	Venezuela	0	1	1	2
15	Netherlands	0	1	0	1
15	Switzerland	0	1	0	1
17	France	0	0	2	2
18	Czech Republic	0	0	1	1
Totals (18 entries)		20	20	20	60

=== Women ===
Rank	Nation	Gold	Silver	Bronze	Total
1	Brazil	9	1	4	14
2	Netherlands	2	2	3	7
3	Switzerland	2	2	1	5
4	United States	2	1	2	5
5	Poland	2	0	2	4
6	Russia	1	4	1	6
7	Canada	1	1	1	3
8	Ukraine	1	0	0	1
9	Germany	0	4	0	4
10	Australia	0	1	1	2
10	Spain	0	1	1	2
12	France	0	1	0	1
12	Italy	0	1	0	1
12	Lithuania	0	1	0	1
15	Austria	0	0	2	2
15	Czech Republic	0	0	2	2
Totals (16 entries)		20	20	20	60

=== Total ===
Rank	Nation	Gold	Silver	Bronze	Total
1	Brazil	16	4	6	26
2	Poland	5	3	4	12
3	Netherlands	2	3	3	8
4	Italy	2	3	1	6
4	Spain	2	3	1	6
4	Switzerland	2	3	1	6
7	Canada	2	2	1	5
8	United States	2	1	2	5
9	Latvia	2	1	1	4
10	Ukraine	2	0	0	2
11	Russia	1	6	5	12
12	Belgium	1	0	0	1
12	Sweden	1	0	0	1
14	Germany	0	5	3	8
15	Austria	0	1	3	4
16	France	0	1	2	3
16	Mexico	0	1	2	3
18	Australia	0	1	1	2
18	Venezuela	0	1	1	2
20	Lithuania	0	1	0	1
21	Czech Republic	0	0	3	3
Totals (21 entries)		40	40	40	120

== See also ==
- FIVB Beach Volleyball U23 World Championships
- FIVB Beach Volleyball U19 World Championships
- FIVB Beach Volleyball U17 World Championships
