= Manhattan Beach Open =

Volleyball Tournament

Tournament information
- Sport: Beach volleyball
- Location: Manhattan Beach, California
- Established: 1960
- Tournament format(s): Double-elimination
- Purse: US$250,000

The Manhattan Beach Open is a beach volleyball tournament held annually during the summer in Manhattan Beach, California. Held on the south side of the Manhattan Beach Pier, the Open is the only professional volleyball tournament in which amateurs are able to "place into" the event through pre-qualifying rounds.

The tournament began in 1960 starting as an amateur event and, since 1984 has been part of the AVP's season (with the exceptions of 1997 and 1998, 2010, 2011 and 2012 it was presented by Pro Beach, and 2020 when it was not run due to Covid-19). Today the event is the largest on the AVP tour drawing an estimated 60,000+ people over three days. It is the longest-running and most prestigious beach volleyball tournament in the United States.

Winners of the tournament are memorialized with bronze volleyball-shaped plaques in the "Volleyball Walk of Fame" mounted on the Manhattan Beach Pier.

== Open Champions ==
The record holder for the most tournament wins by a female is Kathy Gregory, with seven total bronze plaques on the "Volleyball Walk of Fame." For the men, it is Karch Kiraly, who has ten total plaques on the pier.

As of 2002 no game for third place was played for both sexes.

=== Women's results ===
Women's Champions
Year	1st	2nd	3rd	4th (3rd)
1966	Jean Brunicardi / Johnette Latreille	-	-	-
1967	Jean Brunicardi / Johnette Latreille	-	-	-
1968	Jean Brunicardi / Johnette Latreille	-	-	-
1970	Christie Hahn / Roseann Wegrich	-	-	-
1971	Rose Duncan / Susie Malpee	-	-	-
1972	Kathy Gregory / Nina Matthies	-	-	-
1973	Rose Duncan / Kathy Gregory	Cathy Hahn / Nina Matthies	Sheri Caldwell / Sandy Malpee	-
1974	Rose Duncan / Nina Matthies	Kathy Gregory / Miki McFadden	Christie Hahn / Roseann Wegrich	Ginny Fitzgerald / Sandy Malpee
1975	Nina Matthies / Miki McFadden	Kathy Gregory / Roseann Wegrich	Georjean Garvey / Hillary Johnson	Debbie Fonoimoana / Claire McCarty
1976	Kathy Gregory / Miki McFadden	Jill Durkee / Susie Jones	Eileen Clancy / Georjean Garvey	Kathy Hanley / Ann McCampbell
1977	Kathy Gregory / Miki McFadden	Rose Duncan / Jill Durkee	Ann Cunningham / Mary Machado	Kathy Hanley / Maya Thiene
1978	Kathy Gregory / Miki McFadden	Eileen Clancy / Barbara May	Nancy Cohen / Susie Jones	Susan Schwartz / Bonnie Toth
1979	Nancy Cohen / Kathy Gregory	Linda Hanley / Nina Matthies	Eileen Clancy / Barbara May	Jill Durkee / Susie Jones
1980	Linda Hanley / Nina Matthies	Kathy Hanley / Ann McCampbell	Linda Chisholm / Rhonda Stoklos	Ann Cunningham / Anne Hansen
1981	Linda Hanley / Nina Matthies	Beth Rogers / Lisa Strand-Ma'a	Kathy Gregory / Kathy Hanley	Hillary Johnson / Sharkie Zartman
1982	Kathy Hanley / Diane Sebastian	Torrie Dorrell / Dale Keough	Darlene Bailey / Lou Ann Terheggen	Jill Durkee / Susie Jones
1983	Kathy Gregory / Kathy Hanley	Cindy Cochrane / Anna Prousalis	Nina Matthies / Julie Thornton	Bev Lidyoff / Liz Masakayan
1984	Linda Hanley / Nina Matthies	Kathy Hanley / Anna Prousalis	Jeanne Goldsmith / Kathy Gregory	Torrie Dorrell / Dale Keough
1985	Kathy Hanley / Anna Prousalis	Mary Diamond / Julie Thornton	Darlene Bailey / Gail Castro Kehl	Patty Dodd / Liz Masakayan
1986	Linda Hanley / Nina Matthies	Kathy Gregory / Janice Harrer	Linda Chisholm / Heather Hafner	Kathy Hanley / Anna Prousalis
1987	Linda Chisholm / Jackie Silva	Kathy Gregory / Janice Harrer	Linda Hanley / Nina Matthies	Gail Castro Kehl / Heather Hafner
1987	Linda Chisholm / Jackie Silva	Linda Hanley / Nina Matthies	Kathy Gregory / Janice Harrer	Patty Dodd / Dale Hall
1988	Linda Chisholm / Jackie Silva	Janice Harrer / Elaine Roque	Patty Dodd / Lisa Strand-Ma'a	Gail Castro Kehl / Lori Forsythe
1989	Patty Dodd / Jackie Silva	Nina Matthies / Elaine Roque	Linda Chisholm / Janice Harrer	Mary Jo Peppler / Dennie Shupryt Knoop
1989	Linda Chisholm / Janice Harrer	Patty Dodd / Jackie Silva	Dale Hall / Karolyn Kirby	Nina Matthies / Elaine Roque
1990	Karolyn Kirby / Jackie Silva	Linda Chisholm / Linda Hanley	Janice Harrer / Lisa Strand-Ma'a	Nina Matthies / Elaine Roque
1991	Karolyn Kirby / Angela Rock	Linda Chisholm / Liz Masakayan	Gail Castro Kehl / Lori Forsythe	Janice Harrer / Elaine Roque
1992	Marla O'Hara / Dennie Shupryt Knoop	Marie Andersson / Alison Johnson	Charlotte Roach / Gayle Stammer	Heather Hafner / Shannon Millen
1992	Karolyn Kirby / Nancy Reno	Angela Rock / Jackie Silva	Patty Dodd / Elaine Roque	Alison Johnson / Dennie Shupryt Knoop
1993	Cammy Ciarelli / Holly McPeak	Nancy Reno / Angela Rock	Rita Crockett Royster / Linda Hanley	Linda Chisholm / Jackie Silva
1993	Karolyn Kirby / Liz Masakayan	Gail Castro Kehl / Elaine Roque	Barbra Fontana / Lori Forsythe	Deb Richardson / Dennie Shupryt Knoop
1994	Linda Chisholm / Linda Hanley	Cammy Ciarelli / Holly McPeak	Sandra Pires / Jackie Silva	Nancy Reno / Angela Rock
1994	Karolyn Kirby / Liz Masakayan	Barbra Fontana / Lori Forsythe	Deb Richardson / Dennie Shupryt Knoop	Monique Oliver / Gayle Stammer
2001	Barbra Fontana / Elaine Youngs	Lisa Arce / Holly McPeak	Jennifer Meredith / Wendy Stammer	Dianne DeNecochea / Liz Masakayan
2002	Annett Davis / Jenny Johnson Jordan	Holly McPeak / Elaine Youngs	Lisa Arce / Linda Hanley	Carrie Dodd / Leanne McSorley
2003	Misty May-Treanor / Kerri Walsh Jennings	Holly McPeak / Elaine Youngs	Carrie Dodd / Leanne McSorley	Dianne DeNecochea / Nancy Reynolds
2004	Holly McPeak / Elaine Youngs	Annett Davis / Jenny Johnson Jordan	Carrie Dodd / Nancy Reynolds	Misty May-Treanor / Kerri Walsh Jennings
2005	Misty May-Treanor / Kerri Walsh Jennings	Rachel Scott / Elaine Youngs	Jennifer Kessy / Holly McPeak	Tyra Turner / Makare Wilson
2006	Misty May-Treanor / Kerri Walsh Jennings	Nancy Reynolds / Elaine Youngs	Dianne DeNecochea / Tammy Leibl	Nicole Branagh / Holly McPeak
2007	Misty May-Treanor / Kerri Walsh Jennings	Nicole Branagh / Elaine Youngs	Annett Davis / Jenny Johnson Jordan	Rachel Scott / Tyra Turner
2008	Misty May-Treanor / Kerri Walsh Jennings	Jennifer Kessy / April Ross	Annett Davis / Jenny Johnson Jordan	Nicole Branagh / Elaine Youngs
2009	Nicole Branagh / Elaine Youngs	Annett Davis / Jenny Johnson Jordan	Tatiana Minello / Priscilla Piantadosi-Lima	Lisa Fitzgerald / Brooke Niles
2010	No tournament due to the AVP ending the season before the Manhattan Beach Open			
2011	Jenny Kropp / Whitney Pavlik	Jennifer Fopma / Tracy Jones	Emily Day / Heather McGuire	Kristen Batt-Rohr / Brooke Sweat
2012	Jenny Kropp / Whitney Pavlik	Jennifer Fopma / Brooke Sweat	Lauren Fendrick / Rachel Scott	Nicole Branagh / Brittany Hochevar
2013	Whitney Pavlik / Kerri Walsh Jennings	Jennifer Fopma / Brooke Sweat	Lauren Fendrick / Brittany Hochevar	Jennifer Kessy / April Ross
2014	April Ross / Kerri Walsh Jennings	Lauren Fendrick / Brooke Sweat	Lane Carico / Kim DiCello	Emily Day / Summer Ross
2015	Jennifer Fopma / April Ross	Nicole Branagh / Jenny Kropp	Emily Day / Jennifer Kessy	Lane Carico / Summer Ross
2016	Emily Day / Brittany Hochevar	Lane Carico / Summer Ross	Kim DiCello /Kendra VanZwieten	Lauren Fendrick /Brooke Sweat
2017	Emily Day / Brittany Hochevar	Nicole Branagh / Brandie Wilkerson	Lauren Fendrick / April Ross	Kelly Claes / Sara Hughes
2018	Alix Klineman / April Ross	Kelly Claes / Brittany Hochevar	Emily Day / Betsi Flint	Kelley Larsen / Emily Stockman
2019	Melissa Humana-Paredes / Sarah Pavan	Alix Klineman / April Ross	Sara Hughes / Brandie Wilkerson	Terese Cannon / Kelly Reeves
2020	No tournament due to the COVID-19 Pandemic			
2021	Alix Klineman / April Ross	Emily Day / Betsi Flint	Kelly Cheng / Sarah Sponcil	Larissa Maestrini / Liliane Maestrini
2022	Sara Hughes / Kelly Kolinske	Kelly Cheng / Betsi Flint	Terese Cannon / Sarah Sponcil	Zana Muno / Brandie Wilkerson
2023	Betsi Flint / Julia Scoles	Hailey Harward / Kelly Kolinske	Megan Kraft / Emily Stockman	Deahna Kraft / Zana Muno
2024	Taryn Kloth / Kristen Nuss	Betsi Flint / Julia Scoles	Kelly Cheng / Sara Hughes	Toni Rodriguez / Geena Urango

=== Men's results ===
Men's Champions
Year	1st	2nd	3rd	4th (3rd)
1960	Mike Bright / Mike O'Hara	Mike Higer / Gene Selznick	-	-
1961	Mike Bright / Mike O'Hara	Mike Higer / Gene Selznick	-	-
1962	Mike Bright / Mike O'Hara	Ron Lang / Gene Selznick	-	-
1963	Mike Bright / Mike O'Hara	Mike Colbert / Pete Hogan	-	-
1964	Mike Bright / Mike O'Hara	Rand Carter / Ron Von Hagen	-	-
1965	Ron Lang / Gene Selznick	Rand Carter / Ron Von Hagen	-	-
1966	Ron Lang / Ron Von Hagen	Mike Bright / Mike O'Hara	Keith Erickson / Gene Selznick	-
1967	Ron Lang / Ron Von Hagen	Bill Leeka / Bob Vogelsang	Spike Boarts / Bob Smith	Mike O'Hara / Gene Pflueger
1968	Henry Bergman / Larry Rundle	Ron Lang / Ron Von Hagen	Mike Bright / Butch May	-
1969	John Vallely / Ron Von Hagen	Henry Bergman / Larry Rundle	-	-
1970	Henry Bergman / Ron Von Hagen	John Gonzales / Mitch Malpee	Bob Clem / Ron Lang	-
1971	Bob Clem / Larry Rundle	Henry Bergman / Ron Von Hagen	Buzz Swartz / Toshi Toyota	John Gonzales / Mitch Malpee
1972	Matt Gage / Buzz Swartz	Bob Clem / Larry Rundle	Henry Bergman / Ron Von Hagen	Greg Lee / Jon Lee
1973	Bob Jackson / Fred Zeulich	Matt Gage / Ron Von Hagen	Doug Dunlap / Kirk Kilgour	Bob Clem / Greg Lee
1974	Tom Chamales / Ron Von Hagen	Greg Lee / Jim Menges	Bob Jackson / Fred Zeulich	Matt Gage / Buzz Swartz
1975	Greg Lee / Jim Menges	Tom Chamales / Ron Von Hagen	Mike Carey / Dennis Hare	Bob Jackson / Fred Zeulich
1976	Chris Marlowe / Steve Obradovich	Mike Carey / Bob Jackson	Matt Gage / Fred Zeulich	Greg Lee / Jim Menges
1977	Chris Marlowe / Jim Menges	Gary Hooper / Steve Obradovich	Matt Gage / Fred Zeulich	Fred Sturm / Buzz Swartz
1978	Greg Lee / Jim Menges	Andy Fishburn / Fred Sturm	Gary Hooper / Steve Obradovich	Matt Gage / Dane Selznick
1979	Jim Menges / Sinjin Smith	Andy Fishburn / Dane Selznick	Gary Hooper / Steve Obradovich	Chris Marlowe / Fred Sturm
1979	Andy Fishburn / Dane Selznick	Matt Gage / Jim Menges	Chris Marlowe / Randy Stoklos	Gary Hooper / Steve Obradovich
1980	Karch Kiraly / Sinjin Smith	Matt Gage / Jim Menges	Steve Obradovich / Randy Stoklos	Andy Fishburn / Dane Selznick
1980	Karch Kiraly / Sinjin Smith	Andy Fishburn / Dane Selznick	Matt Gage / Jim Menges	Mike Dodd / Jon Stevenson
1981	Jim Menges / Randy Stoklos	Andy Fishburn / Dane Selznick	Gary Hooper / Steve Obradovich	Jon Stevenson / Tim Walmer
1981	Karch Kiraly / Sinjin Smith	Andy Fishburn / Randy Stoklos	Jay Hanseth / Greg Lee	Gary Hooper / Jim Menges
1982	Mike Dodd / Tim Hovland	Sinjin Smith / Randy Stoklos	Andy Fishburn / Dane Selznick	Gary Hooper / Steve Obradovich
1982	Sinjin Smith / Randy Stoklos	Mike Dodd / Tim Hovland	Andy Fishburn / Dane Selznick	Kevin Cleary / Tim Walmer
1983	Mike Dodd / Tim Hovland	Sinjin Smith / Randy Stoklos	John Hanley / Jon Stevenson	Jay Hanseth / Tim Walmer
1984	Mike Dodd / Tim Hovland	Sinjin Smith / Randy Stoklos	Andy Fishburn / Jay Hanseth	John Hanley / Jon Stevenson
1985	Mike Dodd / Tim Hovland	Sinjin Smith / Randy Stoklos	Scott Ayakatubby / Brent Frohoff	John Hanley / Jon Stevenson
1986	Sinjin Smith / Randy Stoklos	Andrew Smith / Jon Stevenson	Robert Chavez / Jay Hanseth	Scott Ayakatubby / Brent Frohoff
1987	Mike Dodd / Tim Hovland	John Hanley / Jon Stevenson	Andy Fishburn / Todd Schaefer	Kevin Cleary / Brent Frohoff
1987	Mike Dodd / Tim Hovland	Sinjin Smith / Randy Stoklos	Andrew Smith / Dan Vrebalovich	John Hanley / Jon Stevenson
1988	Karch Kiraly / Ricci Luyties	Andy Fishburn / Dane Selznick	Dana Fitzgerald / Eugene LeDuff	Bob Ctvrtlik / Steve Timmons
1989	Sinjin Smith / Randy Stoklos	Mike Dodd / Tim Hovland	Brent Frohoff / Karch Kiraly	Craig Moothart / Steve Obradovich
1990	Brent Frohoff / Karch Kiraly	Sinjin Smith / Randy Stoklos	Mike Dodd / Tim Hovland	Al Janc / Tim Walmer
1991	Karch Kiraly / Kent Steffes	Scott Ayakatubby / Steve Timmons	Sinjin Smith / Randy Stoklos	Mike Dodd / Ricci Luyties
1992	Karch Kiraly / Kent Steffes	Sinjin Smith / Randy Stoklos	Brian Lewis / Craig Moothart	Bruk Vandeweghe / Dan Vrebalovich
1993	Karch Kiraly / Kent Steffes	Adam Johnson / Bruk Vandeweghe	Mike Dodd / Mike Whitmarsh	Brian Lewis / Steve Timmons
1994	Adam Johnson / Randy Stoklos	Bill Boullianne / Brian Lewis	Eduardo Bacil / Jose Loiola	Brent Frohoff / Ricci Luyties
1995	Adam Johnson / José Loiola	Scott Ayakatubby / Randy Stoklos	Mike Dodd / Mike Whitmarsh	Karch Kiraly / Kent Steffes
1996	Karch Kiraly / Kent Steffes	Adam Johnson / Jose Loiola	Mike Dodd / Mike Whitmarsh	Scott Ayakatubby / Brian Lewis
1999	David Swatik / Mike Whitmarsh	Jose Loiola / Emanuel Rego	Adam Johnson / Karch Kiraly	Dain Blanton / Eric Fonoimoana
2000	Jose Loiola / Emanuel Rego	Canyon Ceman / Mike Whitmarsh	Eduardo Bacil / Fred Souza	Dax Holdren / Todd Rogers
2001	Stein Metzger / Kevin Wong	Eric Fonoimoana / Rob Heidger	Canyon Ceman / Mike Whitmarsh	Dax Holdren / Todd Rogers
2002	Eric Fonoimoana / Dax Holdren	Canyon Ceman / Mike Whitmarsh	Brent Doble / Karch Kiraly	Eduardo Bacil / Fred Souza
2003	Eric Fonoimoana / Kevin Wong	Eduardo Bacil / Jose Loiola	Matt Fuerbringer / Casey Jennings	Canyon Ceman / Mike Whitmarsh
2004	Karch Kiraly / Mike Lambert	Matt Fuerbringer / Casey Jennings	Eric Fonoimoana / Kevin Wong	Dain Blanton / Jeff Nygaard
2005	Jake Gibb / Stein Metzger	Phil Dalhausser / Nick Lucena	Dax Holdren / Jeff Nygaard	Sean Rosenthal / Larry Witt
2006	Phil Dalhausser / Todd Rogers	Mike Lambert / Stein Metzger	Dax Holdren / Sean Scott	John Hyden / Jeff Nygaard
2007	Phil Dalhausser / Todd Rogers	Dax Holdren / Sean Scott	Anthony Medel / Fred Souza	Jake Gibb / Sean Rosenthal
2008	Phil Dalhausser / Todd Rogers	Nick Lucena / Sean Scott	Matt Olson / Kevin Wong	Matt Fuerbringer / Casey Jennings
2009	Jake Gibb / Sean Rosenthal	Matt Olson / Kevin Wong	Brad Keenan / Nick Lucena	Phil Dalhausser / Todd Rogers
2010	No tournament due to the AVP ending the season before the Manhattan Beach Open			
2011	John Hyden / Sean Scott	Billy Allen / Brad Keenan	Ryan Mariano / Ed Ratledge	John Mayer / Matt Prosser
2012	John Hyden / Sean Scott	Ryan Doherty / Casey Patterson	Matt Fuerbringer / Nick Lucena	Billy Allen / Matt Prosser
2013	Matt Fuerbringer / Casey Jennings	Phil Dalhausser / Sean Rosenthal	Ryan Doherty / Todd Rogers	Jake Gibb / Casey Patterson
2014	Phil Dalhausser / Sean Rosenthal	Theo Brunner / Todd Rogers	Tri Bourne / John Hyden	Brad Keenan / John Mayer
2015	Phil Dalhausser / Nick Lucena	Tri Bourne / John Hyden	Ryan Doherty / John Mayer	Taylor Crabb / Trevor Crabb
2016	Jake Gibb / Casey Patterson	Tri Bourne / John Hyden	Phil Dalhausser / Nick Lucena	Taylor Crabb / Trevor Crabb
2017	Phil Dalhausser / Nick Lucena	Trevor Crabb / Sean Rosenthal	Reid Priddy / Ricardo Santos	Theo Brunner / Casey Patterson
2018	Phil Dalhausser / Nick Lucena	Taylor Crabb / Jake Gibb	Theo Brunner / John Hyden	Jeremy Casebeer / Reid Priddy
2019	Trevor Crabb / Reid Priddy	Chase Budinger / Casey Patterson	Phil Dalhausser / Nick Lucena	Eric Baranek / Billy Kolinske
2020	No tournament due to the COVID-19 Pandemic			
2021	Tri Bourne / Trevor Crabb	Chase Budinger / Casey Patterson	Theo Brunner / Chaim Schalk	Billy Allen / Andy Benesh
2022	Tri Bourne / Trevor Crabb	Theo Brunner / Chaim Schalk	Taylor Crabb / Taylor Sander	Andy Benesh / Miles Evans
2023	Taylor Crabb / Taylor Sander	Theo Brunner / Trevor Crabb	Hagen Smith / Logan Webber	Cody Caldwell / Seain Cook
2024	Theo Brunner / Trevor Crabb	Andy Benesh / Miles Partain	Taylor Sander / Taylor Crabb	Miles Evans / Chase Budinger
