= Alix Klineman =

American volleyball player (born 1989)

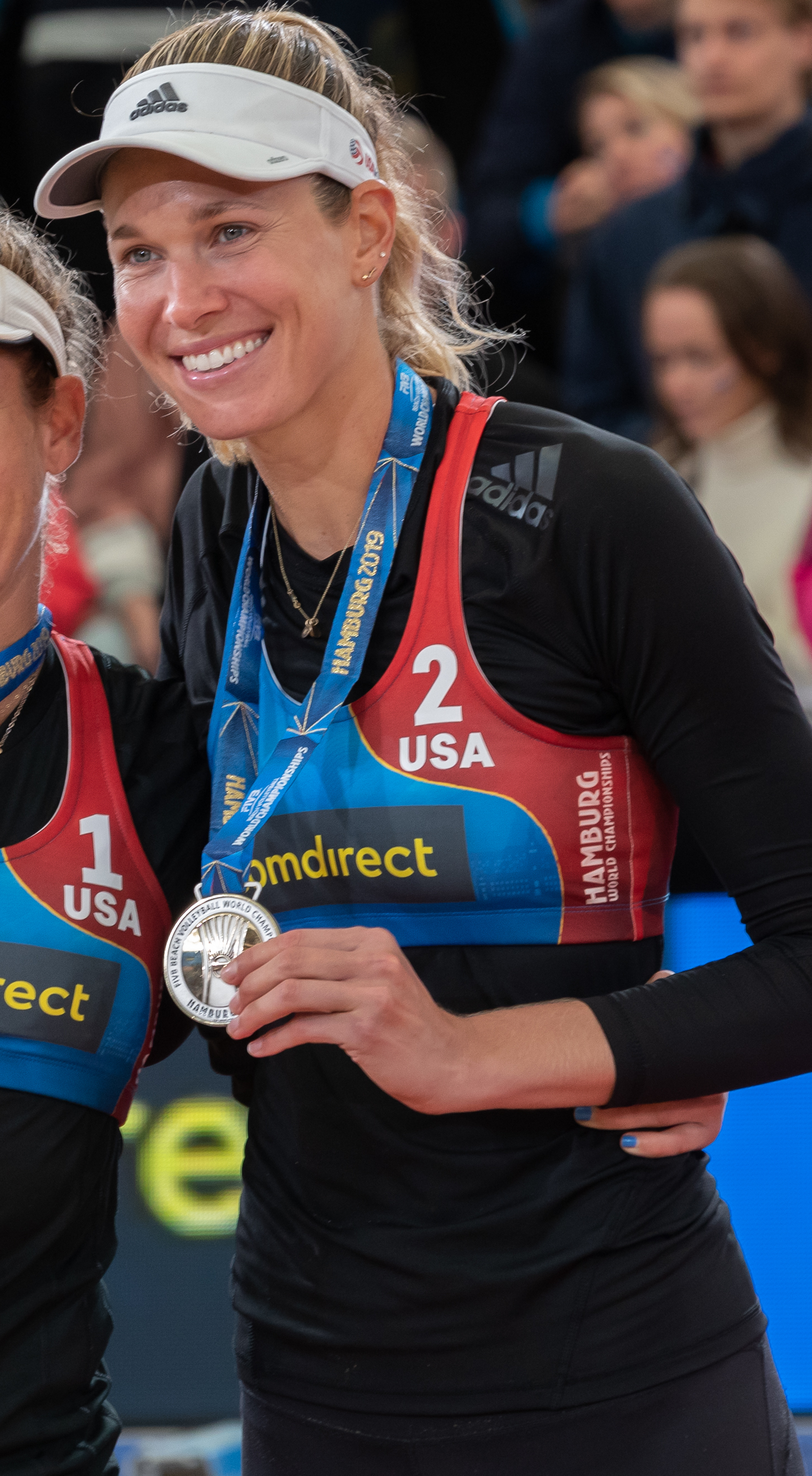
- Klineman in 2019

Personal information
- Full name: Alexandra Rose Klineman
- Born: December 30, 1989 (age 36) Manhattan Beach, California, U.S.
- Height: 1.96 m (6 ft 5 in)
- Weight: 79 kg (174 lb)

Volleyball information
- Position: Outside hitter

Career
- Years: Team
- 2007–2010 2011–2012 2012–2013 2013–2014 2014–2015 2015–2017: Stanford University; Scavolini Pesaro; Mc Carnaghi Villa Cortese; Imoco Volley Conegliano; Igor Gorgonzola Novara; Dentil Praia Clube

National team
- Years: Team
- 2008–2021: United States
Medal record
Women's beach volleyball
Representing the United States
Olympic Games
Gold medal – first place	2020 Tokyo	Beach
World Championships
Silver medal – second place	2019 Hamburg	Beach
World Tour Finals
Bronze medal – third place	2021 Cagliari	Beach
FIVB BVB World Tour
Gold medal – first place	2018 The Hague	Beach
Gold medal – first place	2019 Yangzhou	Beach
Gold medal – first place	2019 Itapema	Beach
Gold medal – first place	2019 Gstaad	Beach
Gold medal – first place	2021 Doha	Beach
Silver medal – second place	2019 Tokyo	Beach
Bronze medal – third place	2021 Cancún	Beach
Bronze medal – third place	2021 Cancún	Beach
AVP Pro BVB Tour
Gold medal – first place	2018 Hawaii	Beach
Gold medal – first place	2018 Championships (Chicago)	Beach
Gold medal – first place	2018 Manhattan Beach	Beach
Gold medal – first place	2018 Austin Open	Beach
Gold medal – first place	2019 Championships (Chicago)	Beach
Gold medal – first place	2019 New York City	Beach
Gold medal – first place	2019 Huntington Beach	Beach
Gold medal – first place	2021 Manhattan Beach	Beach
Silver medal – second place	2018 Hermosa Beach	Beach
Silver medal – second place	2019 Manhattan Beach	Beach
Bronze medal – third place	2018 San Francisco	Beach
Bronze medal – third place	2018 New York City	Beach
Pan American Games
Bronze medal – third place	2011 Guadalajara	Team

Alexandra Rose "Alix" Klineman (born December 30, 1989) is an American beach volleyball player, 2020 Summer Olympics gold medalist, and former indoor volleyball player.

In high school she was the 2006 Gatorade National Player of the Year. She was a four-time All-American in volleyball at Stanford University, and the 2010 Volleyball Magazine national player of the year. She won a bronze medal with Team USA at the 2011 Pan American Games.

Switching to beach volleyball, she was named part of the 2018 Association of Volleyball Professionals Team of the Year (along with April Ross), and individually honored with the 2018 and 2019 Best Blocker awards.

== Early life ==
Klineman was born in Torrance, California, to Mike and Kathie Klineman, raised in Manhattan Beach, California, and is Jewish. She has an older brother, Max, and a sister, Maddy. She is 6 ft 5 in (1.96 m) in height.

== High school ==
Klineman graduated from Mira Costa High School in Manhattan Beach, California in 2007. She was named the 2005 and 2006 California Gatorade State Player of the Year for Volleyball, and the 2006 Gatorade National Player of the Year. She was also the 2004 and 2006 California State Championship most valuable player, PrepVolleyball.com 2004 Sophomore Player of the Year and 2006 Senior Player of the Year, and a three-time PrepVolleyball.com High School All-American. She led Mira Costa to three consecutive California State Championships, and three consecutive Southern Section CIF Championships. In indoor volleyball, Klineman is an outside hitter.

== College ==
She played indoor college women's volleyball at Stanford University for the Stanford Cardinal women's volleyball team in 2007–2010. She was the 2010 Volleyball Magazine Player of the Year as a college senior, a multi American Volleyball Coaches Association (AVCA) All-American, the Pac-10 Conference Player of the Year, and an All-Conference selection all four years. Klineman was also the AVCA National Freshman of the Year, leading the Cardinal to the NCAA Finals, and she made the NCAA All-Tournament Team. She finished her college career second at Stanford and fifth all-time in Pac-10 history with 2,008 kills. In 2010, she ranked second in the US with 5.55 kills per set and 6.25 points per set.

== Team USA ==
She was on the USA Junior National Women's Volleyball Team and a member of the United States women's national volleyball team. She helped the U.S. Girls' Youth National Team win a gold medal at the 2004 North, Central America and Caribbean Volleyball Confederation (NORCECA) Girls' Youth Continental Championship, and a gold medal at the 2006 NORCECA Women's Junior Continental Championship. Klineman was a training member of the United States women's national volleyball team. She won a bronze medal with the US in volleyball at the 2011 Pan American Games.

== Professional indoor volleyball career ==
She also played volleyball in Italy from 2011 to 2015 for Volley Pesaro, Gruppo Sportivo Oratorio Villa Cortese, and AGIL Volley Novara, and with Praia Clube in Brazil for two years.

Klineman served a 13-month ban from May 2013 to June 2014 for an anti-doping rule violation for use of anabolic androgenic steroids relating to unintentional ingestion of her mother's DHEA supplement.

== Beach volleyball career ==
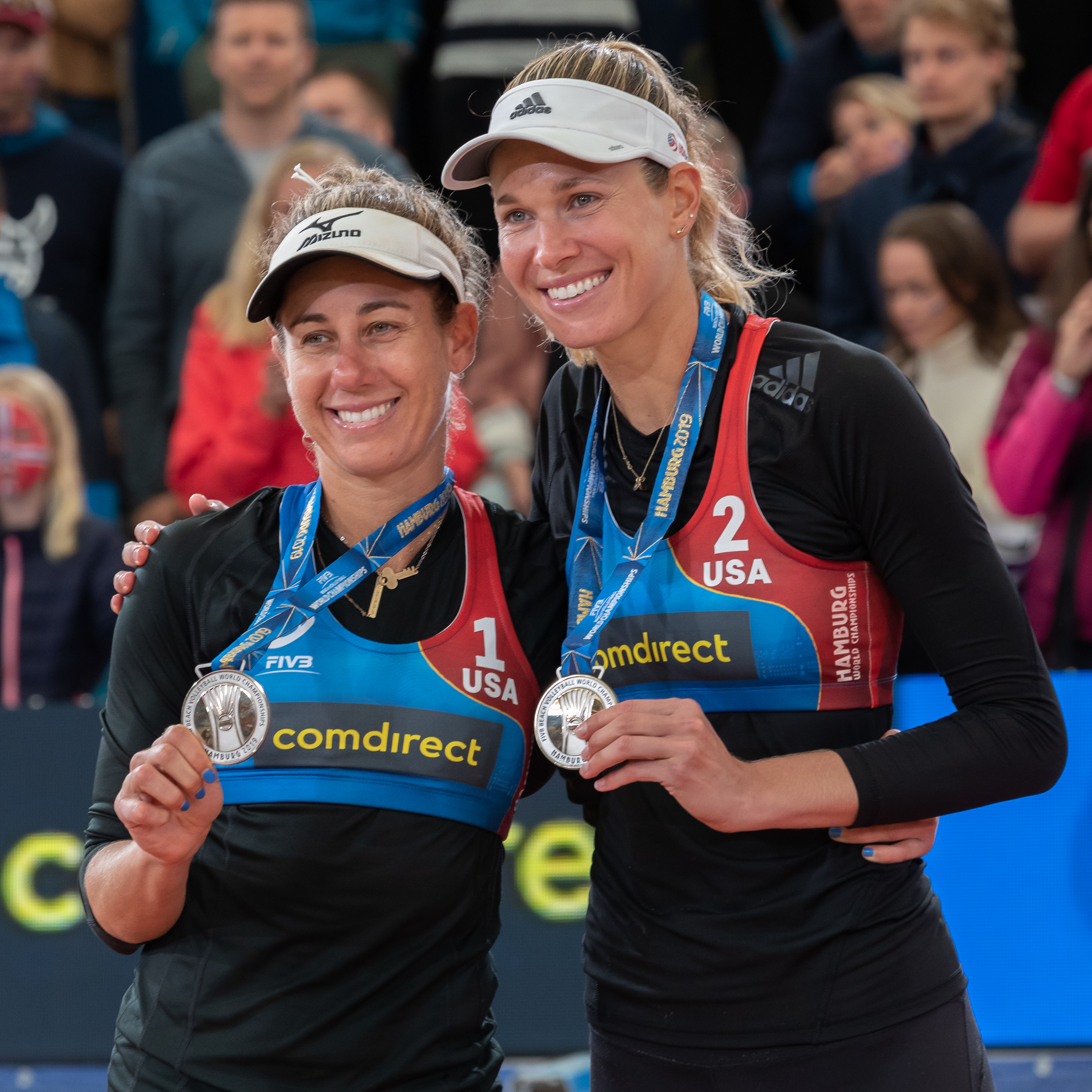
April Ross (left) and Klineman in 2019

In 2017, Klineman left indoor volleyball to focus on beach volleyball full-time, and was named the Association of Volleyball Professionals (AVP) Rookie of the Year. At the end of 2017, Klineman and April Ross became beach volleyball partners. In November 2017, Klineman received a "no fault or negligence" ruling after testing positive for prohibited substances as they were contained within contaminated prescription medication.

Klineman and Ross won the FIVB Dela Beach Open in January 2018, which was the first tournament they played together. During the 2018 AVP Pro Beach Volleyball Tour, Klineman and Ross won four tournament events: the Austin Open, the Manhattan Beach Open, the Championships (in Chicago), and the Hawaii Invitational. In mid-October 2018, Klineman and Ross won their second FIVB tournament event, earning the gold medal over Brazil at the Yangzhou Open. Klineman was named part of the AVP Team of the Year (along with April Ross), and individually honored with the Best Blocker and Most Improved Player awards at the AVP Award Banquet that November.

In 2019, Klineman's success with Ross continued as they won the Huntington Beach and New York City Open AVP tour events, and won the FIVB Itapema Open mid-May. They also won the silver medal at the 2019 Beach Volleyball World Championships in Hamburg, Germany. Klineman was again named Best Blocker.

In July 2020, the two won the AVP Monster Hydro Cup and the Wilson Cup, and in August they won the AVP Champions Cup.

On August 6, 2021, Klineman and Ross captured the gold medal at the 2020 Summer Olympics, after winning in straight sets versus Australia. In the entire tournament, they went undefeated in match play, only losing one set throughout seven matches. Two weeks later, the pair won the AVP Manhattan Beach Open, their second time winning this tournament together.

== Awards ==
=== Clubs ===
- 2014–15 Italian Women's Volleyball League – Silver medal, with AGIL Volley.
- 2015–16 Brazilian Women's Volleyball Superliga – Silver medal, with Dentil Praia Clube.
- 2017 South American Club Championship – Silver medal, with Dentil Praia Clube.

=== Individual ===
- 2015 Inducted into the Southern California Jewish Sports Hall of Fame
- 2017 South American Club Championship "Best Outside Hitter"
- 2018 AVP Team of the Year (with April Ross)
- 2018 AVP Most Improved Player
- 2018 AVP Best Blocker
- 2019 AVP Best Blocker

== See also ==
- List of Jews in sports
- List of Jewish Olympic medalists
