= Summer Ross =

American beach volleyball player (born 1992)

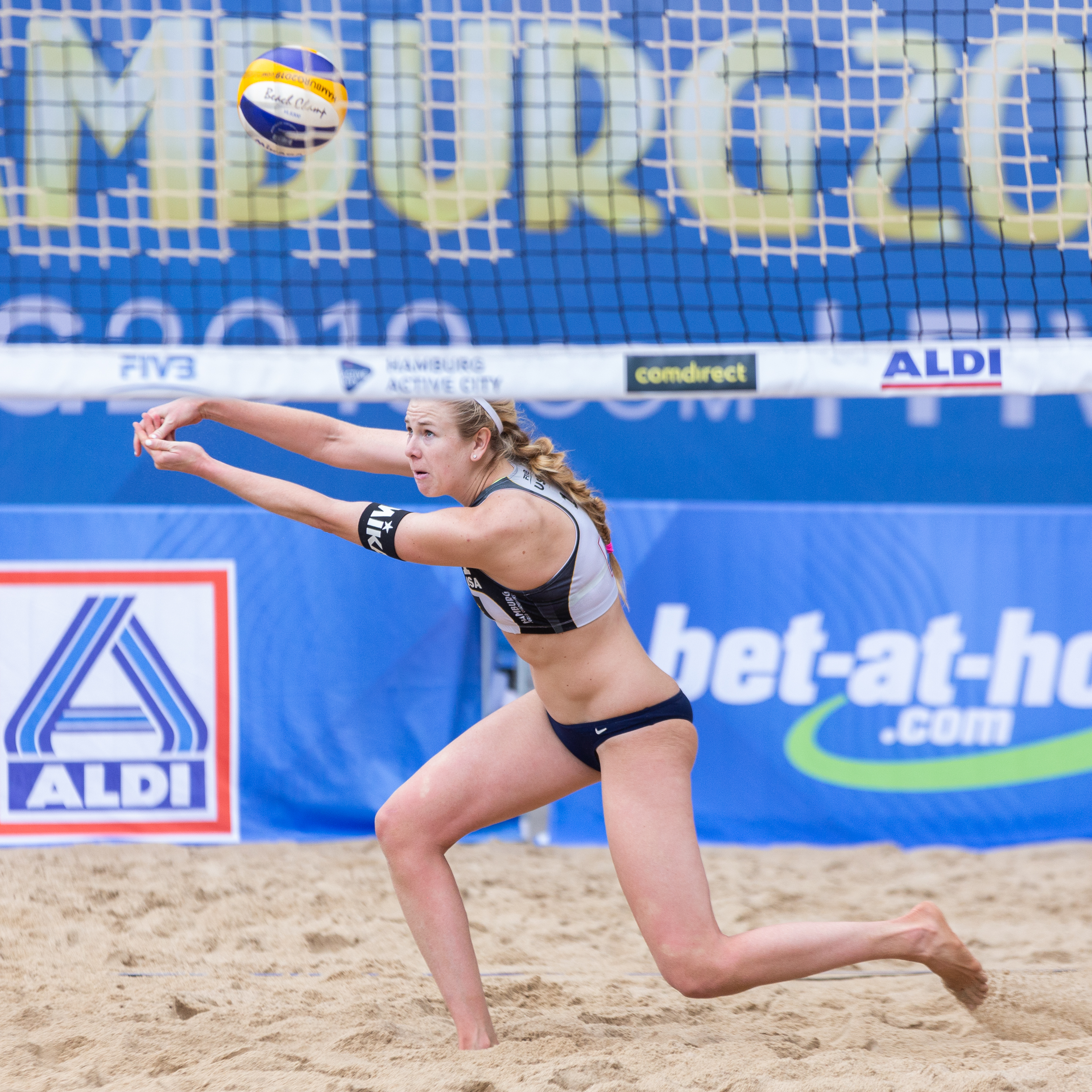
- Ross at the 2019 World Championships

Personal information
- Nationality: American
- Born: December 20, 1992 (age 33) Carlsbad, California, U.S.
- Home town: Manhattan Beach, California, U.S.
- Height: 6 ft 2 in (188 cm)

Sport
- Country: United States
- Sport: Beach volleyball
- Position: Left side/blocker
- Turned pro: 2013
- Partner: Sara Hughes (2018–2022)
- Former partners: Brooke Sweat (2017–18); Lane Carico (2015–16); Jennifer Fopma (2015); Emily Day (2013–14)
- Coached by: José Loiola (2018–)
Medal record
Women's beach volleyball
Representing the United States
World Tour
Gold medal – first place	2018 Moscow	Beach
Silver medal – second place	2017 Moscow	Beach
Bronze medal – third place	2018 Qinzhou	Beach
Bronze medal – third place	2018 Fort Lauderdale	Beach
Bronze medal – third place	2018 Espinho	Beach
Bronze medal – third place	2019 Yangzhou	Beach
FIVB Beach Volleyball U21 World Championships
Gold medal – first place	2010 Alanya	Beach
FIVB Beach Volleyball U19 World Championships
Gold medal – first place	2010 Porto	Beach
- Updated on August 25, 2018

Summer Ross (born December 20, 1992) is an American beach volleyball player. She was the FIVB 2010 Youth Under-19 and Junior Under-21 world champion, the only player to win both titles in the same year and was named 2010 USA Volleyball Beach Female Athlete of the Year. As of 2018, her partner is Sara Hughes.

== Early life and junior career ==
Ross was born in Carlsbad, California to Tony and Kathy. Her older brother, Chase, was a member of the men's volleyball team at Pepperdine University.

Ross began working with coaches from the USA Volleyball (USAV) Beach Program in 2008. Competing with Jane Croson, Ross placed ninth at the 2008 U21 World Championships and fifth at the 2009 U19 World Championships. She had another fifth-place finish with teammate Jazmin Machado at the 2009 U21 World Championships. Her breakthrough came in 2010, when Ross and Croson won the U19 World Championships in August. The following month, Ross partnered with Tara Roenicke to win the U21 World Championships, defeating Italy's Marta Menegatti and Viktoria Orsi Toth in three sets in the gold-medal match. With these wins, 17-year-old Ross became the first beach volleyball player to win both age-group World Championships in the same year. By the end of 2010, Ross had been featured in Sports Illustrated's Faces in the Crowd and was named USAV's Beach Female Athlete of the Year. Ross also placed fourth at the U21 World Championships with Sara Hughes two years later.

Ross was also an active club indoor volleyball player and played for Carlsbad High School in her freshman and sophomore years. She graduated as valedictorian from Carlsbad Seaside Academy in 2011.

== College ==
Regarded as one of the top high school recruits for indoor volleyball, Ross played as a right-side hitter for the Washington Huskies during her freshman year in 2011. Ross started in all of the team's 32 matches and led the Huskies in service aces. Following her freshman season, beach volleyball became an NCAA Emerging Sport for Women and several Division I colleges began sponsoring the sport. Ross transferred to Pepperdine University in 2012 in order to pursue NCAA beach volleyball as Washington did not have a team at the time. As a sophomore, she partnered with Caitlin Racich to lead Pepperdine to both the inaugural team and pairs AVCA National Championships. She was named a Division I Collegiate Beach All-American at the end of season. Later that year, Ross and partner Emily Day won the 2012 World University Championships in Maceio, Brazil.

After one season at Pepperdine, Ross left college in 2013 to play beach volleyball professionally.

== Amateur career ==
While still in high school and college, Ross competed as an amateur on the domestic and international professional tours. She made her Association of Volleyball Professionals (AVP) debut at the $105K Long Beach Open in 2008, losing in the first round of the qualifiers. The following year, at the respective ages of 16 and 17, Ross and partner Natalie Hagglund became the youngest team at the time to ever qualify for an AVP main draw at the 2009 Manhattan Beach Open, eventually finishing in 49th place.

Ross qualified for the main draw at four of the five AVP tournaments she entered during the 2010 season, placing as high as 13th before the league suspended operations for the season. In July 2012, Ross competed with former Olympian, Nicole Branagh, at the Berlin Grand Slam, making her first main draw in an elite international tournament. The following week, Ross was granted a wild card into the Klagenfurt Grand Slam with her U21 partner, Tara Roenicke, as part of the prize for winning the FIVB Beach Volleyball U21 World Championships in 2010.

== Professional career ==
=== 2013–2014: Partnering with Emily Day ===
At the start of the 2013 World Tour, Ross teamed up with Brittany Hochevar to finish 17th at the $146.4K Fuzhou Open. Ross switched partners to Emily Day in the middle of the year. After 17th places in their first two tournaments together, Ross and Day went on to finish within the top five in three $220K Grand Slams. In July, the 39th-seeded pair tied for 17th at the World Championships in Stare Jabłonki, losing to Doris and Stefanie Schwaiger of Austria in the Round of 32. They reached their first World Tour podium at the $146.4K Phuket Open in November, where they were the runners-up after being beaten in the gold-medal match by China's Xia Xinyi and Xue Chen. Ross and Day finished the year ranked No. 22 in the world. The pair also had success on the AVP tour. Despite having to go through the qualifiers in their first AVP event together, Ross and Day upset the second-seeded Kerri Walsh Jennings and Whitney Pavlik in the finals to win the $75K Cincinnati Open in September, giving Ross her first AVP title. The pair went on to reach the finals at the next two AVP stops, losing to Jennifer Kessy and April Ross in the $50K Atlantic City Open, while the final match of the $75K St. Petersburg Open was cancelled due to inclement weather.

On the 2014 World Tour, Ross and Day's best finish was taking fifth place at the $400K Stavanger Grand Slam in June, following a quarterfinal defeat by eventual champions April Ross and Walsh Jennings. The duo also posted two ninth-place finishes at the $400K Shanghai and $500K Long Beach Grand Slams. They ended the World Tour season ranked No. 21. Ross and Day entered the 2014 AVP season as the top seeds. Competing in seven AVP tournaments, their best result was a second-place finish at the $75K Atlantic City Open in September, in which they lost to April Ross and Walsh Jennings in straight sets in the finals. They also came in third in three events.

=== 2015–2016: Partnering with Jennifer Fopma and Lane Carico ===
Ross and Day ended their partnership and Ross teamed up with Jennifer Fopma for the first half of the 2015 World Tour. With Fopman, Ross's best finish was a fifth place at the $75,000 Prague Open in May. Ross played with Lane Carico for the second half of the year, posting two more fifth-place finishes at the $75K Rio de Janeiro and Sochi Opens. They finished the World Tour season ranked 37th in the world. Domestically, the duo competed in three AVP tournaments, coming in second in the $75,000 Seattle Open, and third in the $100K Manhattan Beach and $75K Chicago Opens.

In the 2016 AVP season, Ross and partner Lane Carico won the $75K Seattle Open as the number two seeds, beating Fopma and Hochevar in two sets in the final match. They came in second or third in the remaining AVP events that they entered. They competed in 13 events on the World Tour; their best result was a fifth-place finish after coming through the qualifying rounds at the $75,000 Fuzhou Open, as well as six ninth-place finishes. They ended the year ranked No. 23.

=== 2017: Partnering with Brooke Sweat ===
At the end of 2016, Ross split with Carico and teamed up with Brooke Sweat. In the 2017 AVP season, Ross won the $75K Seattle Open again with new partner Brooke Sweat, beating Betsi Flint and Kelley Larsen in straight sets. The pair were also runners-up at the $87.5K New York City Open and the $112.5K Chicago Championships. On the World Tour, they came in second at the $75K Moscow Open in June, losing to the top-seeded Talita Antunes and Larissa França of Brazil in the gold-medal match. They also had a fourth-place finish at the $300K Fort Lauderdale Major, as well as a fifth-place finish at the 2017 World Championships, losing in the quarterfinals to the eventual champions Laura Ludwig and Kira Walkenhorst of Germany.

=== 2018–present: Partnering with Sara Hughes ===
In March 2018, Ross and partner Brooke Sweat won the bronze medal in the Fort Lauderdale Major of the 2018 FIVB Beach Volleyball World Tour, with Ross recording the most points, kills and blocks in the tournament. Later that month, Ross left her previous partner Sweat to team up with Sara Hughes, who she previously played with in the 2012 U21 World Championships. Hughes and Ross won their first tournament as a team at the AVP New York Open in June 2018, as part of the 2018 AVP Pro Beach Volleyball Tour. The pair medalled in their first FIVB Beach Volleyball World Tour tournament the following month, winning bronze at the Espinho Open. Hughes and Ross later won the 2018 AVP Hermosa Beach Open and the 2018 Moscow Open, the latter being their first FIVB gold medal.

At the end of 2018, Ross was named USAV's Female Beach Athlete of the Year for the first time since 2010.

== Style of play ==
Ross is a blocker and specializes in playing on the left side of the court. She has been noted for her hand setting, a skill that is uncommon in the women's game. She also possesses good ball control and a strong offensive game. During matches, Ross is known for her calm and reserved demeanor. Teammate Hughes has complimented Ross' aggressiveness at the net, while former partner Sweat described her as "a really consistent, solid, steady player."

Of the 87 players who competed in a Major Series main draw on the 2018 World Tour, Ross ranked first for total points scored, averaging 9.05 points per set; first for total kills, averaging 7.46 kills per set; 24th for number of aces, with around 4.5 percent of her serves being aces; and third for total blocks, averaging 1.19 blocks per set.
