= Jennifer Fopma =

American beach volleyball player (born 1981)

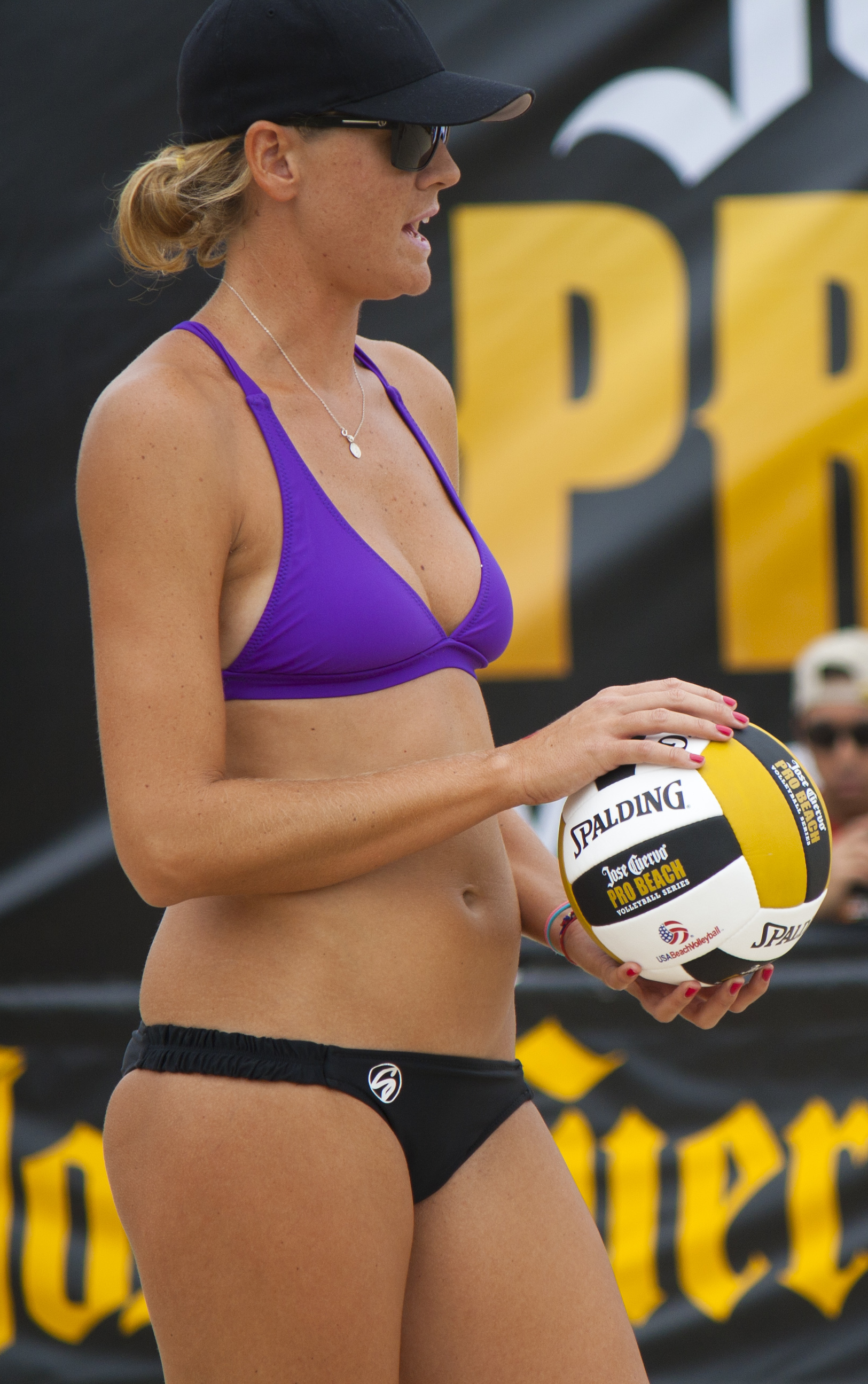
- Fopma in 2012

Personal information
- Nationality: American
- Born: October 30, 1981 (age 45); Leiden, Netherlands
- Hometown: Costa Mesa, California, U.S.
- Height: 6 ft 3 in (190 cm)
- Weight: 165 lb (75 kg)

Beach volleyball information
Teammate
Brooke Sweat, April Ross, Summer Ross, Keao Burdine, Brittany Hochevar, Jenny Pavley, Holly McPeak
Medal record
Women's beach volleyball
Representing the United States
World Tour
Bronze medal – third place	2013 Berlin	Beach

Jennifer Conover (née Fopma, born October 30, 1981) is a retired American beach volleyball player.

== Career and personal life ==
Fopma was born in Leiden to American parents living in the Netherlands. Her family moved back to the U.S. when she was aged one. She started her graduation at Pepperdine University, and then moved to California State University, Northridge.

She started her career in 2005 with the AVP tours. Fopma had her best ever international (FIVB) finish with her then-partner Brooke Sweat, when they placed third at the 2013 Berlin Grand Slam.

She is married to the Men's team's former coach, Jeff Conover. The couple have a son.
