= Sara Hughes =

American beach volleyball player (born 1995)

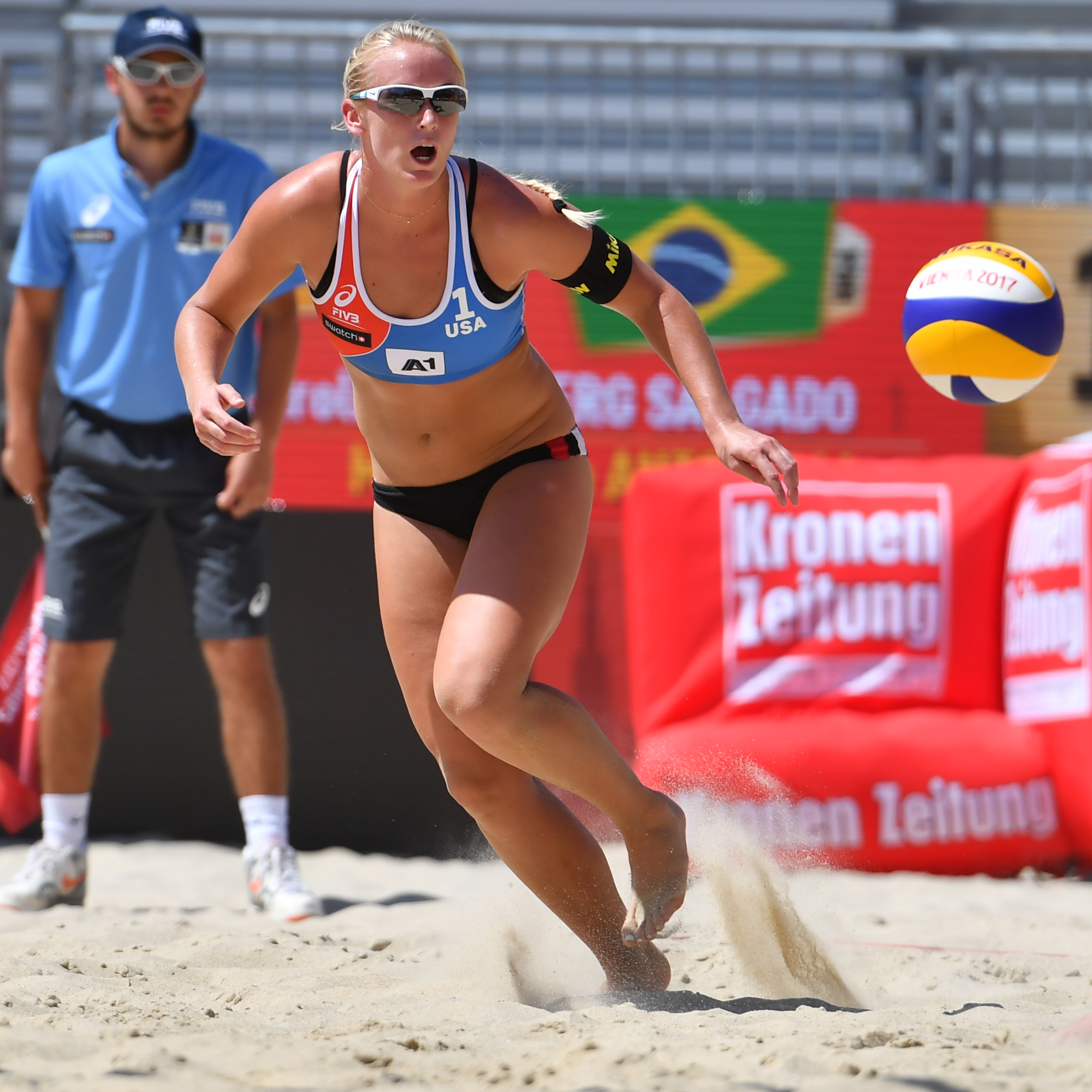
- Hughes at the 2017 Beach Volleyball World Championships

Personal information
- Full name: Sara Elizabeth Hughes
- Born: February 14, 1995 (age 31) Long Beach, California, U.S.
- Education: University of Southern California
- Years active: 2011–present
- Height: 5 ft 10 in (178 cm)

Sport
- Country: United States
- Sport: Beach volleyball
- College team: USC Trojans
- Intercollegiate Athletic Conference: Pac-12
- Turned pro: 2017
- Partner: Ally Batenhorst (2025-)
- Former partners: Justine Wong-Orantes (2004–12); Kelly Cheng (2013–18, 2022–25); Summer Ross (2018–19); Kelley Kolinske (2022)
- Coached by: José Loiola (2016–present)

Achievements and titles
- Highest world ranking: No. 2 (August 23, 2023)
Medal record
Women's beach volleyball
Representing the United States
World Championships
Gold medal – first place	2023 Tlaxcala	Beach
World Tour Finals
Gold medal – first place	2022 Doha	Beach
World Tour
Gold medal – first place	2018 Moscow	Beach
Gold medal – first place	2020 Siem Reap	Beach
Gold medal – first place	2021 Rubavu	Beach
Gold medal – first place	2022 Itapema	Beach
Gold medal – first place	2022 Torquay	Beach
Gold medal – first place	2022 Torquay	Beach
Gold medal – first place	2023 Tepic	Beach
Gold medal – first place	2024 Ostrava	Beach
Silver medal – second place	2023 Gstaad	Beach
Bronze medal – third place	2018 Espinho	Beach
Bronze medal – third place	2019 Yangzhou	Beach
Bronze medal – third place	2021 Itapema	Beach
Bronze medal – third place	2024 Doha	Beach
Bronze medal – third place	2026 Bhubaneswar	Beach
Bronze medal – third place	2026 Tlaxcala	Beach
U21 World Championships
Bronze medal – third place	2014 Larnaka
U19 World Championships
Bronze medal – third place	2013 Porto

Sara Elizabeth Hughes (born February 14, 1995) is an American beach volleyball player. With teammate Kelly Cheng she achieved a career-high world ranking of No. 2 in August 2023. Hughes has won six tournaments on the AVP Pro Tour and seven gold medals, one silver medal, and three bronze medals on the FIVB World Tour/Pro Beach Tour.

Hughes began her beach volleyball training in Huntington Beach, California, at the age of eight. As a junior, she partnered with Cheng to win bronze medals at the 2013 U19 and 2014 U21 World Championships. Her partnership with Cheng continued through college, where the pair won 103 consecutive collegiate matches and led the USC Trojans to back-to-back NCAA Championships in 2016 and 2017. Soon after turning professional in mid-2017, Hughes and Cheng became the youngest team to win an AVP event when they won the season-ending Championship. Hughes split from Cheng in early 2018 and teamed up with Summer Ross. In their first year playing together, Hughes and Ross won their first World Tour title and entered the top ten of the world rankings. Hughes re-partnered with Cheng in late 2022, winning several Beach Pro Tour events including the Finals in Doha in January 2023.

Hughes is a right-side defender and has been noted for her speed and willingness to chase down balls. She is the 2017 FIVB Top Rookie.

== Early life and junior career ==
Hughes was born in Long Beach, California, to Rory and Laura. She has an older brother, Connor, and an older sister, Lauren. Her mother is a former volleyball player and both her siblings played the sport in college, with Connor winning two NCAA Men's Volleyball Championships with the UC Irvine Anteaters.

Growing up in Costa Mesa, California, in a volleyball-playing family, Hughes regularly attended her siblings' practices and tournaments. During one such instance, a player's parent was impressed by eight-year-old Hughes' peppering and recommended her to local beach volleyball youth coach Bill Lovelace. According to Hughes, she first came to love the sport when Lovelace praised her ball control as the best he had ever seen for an eight-year-old. After a successful tryout, she began training under Lovelace every summer in Huntington Beach until she was 15.

A standout junior beach volleyball player, Hughes won numerous tournaments on the Amateur Athletic Union and California Beach Volleyball Association circuits. From 2004 to 2012, she was mostly partnered with Justine Wong-Orantes, playing as a blocker. With Wong-Orantes, Hughes placed ninth at the 2011 and 2012 U19 World Championships. She also finished fourth at the 2012 U21 World Championships with Summer Ross. The following year, Hughes began playing with Kelly Claes and transitioned into a full-time defender. The duo won bronze medals at the 2013 U19 and 2014 U21 World Championships.

Hughes also played club indoor volleyball as the setter for Mizuno Long Beach, and was named most valuable player after her club won the 16-U Junior Olympics national championship in 2011. She played indoor volleyball for Mater Dei High School as well and was the Orange County Player of the Year as a senior.

== College ==
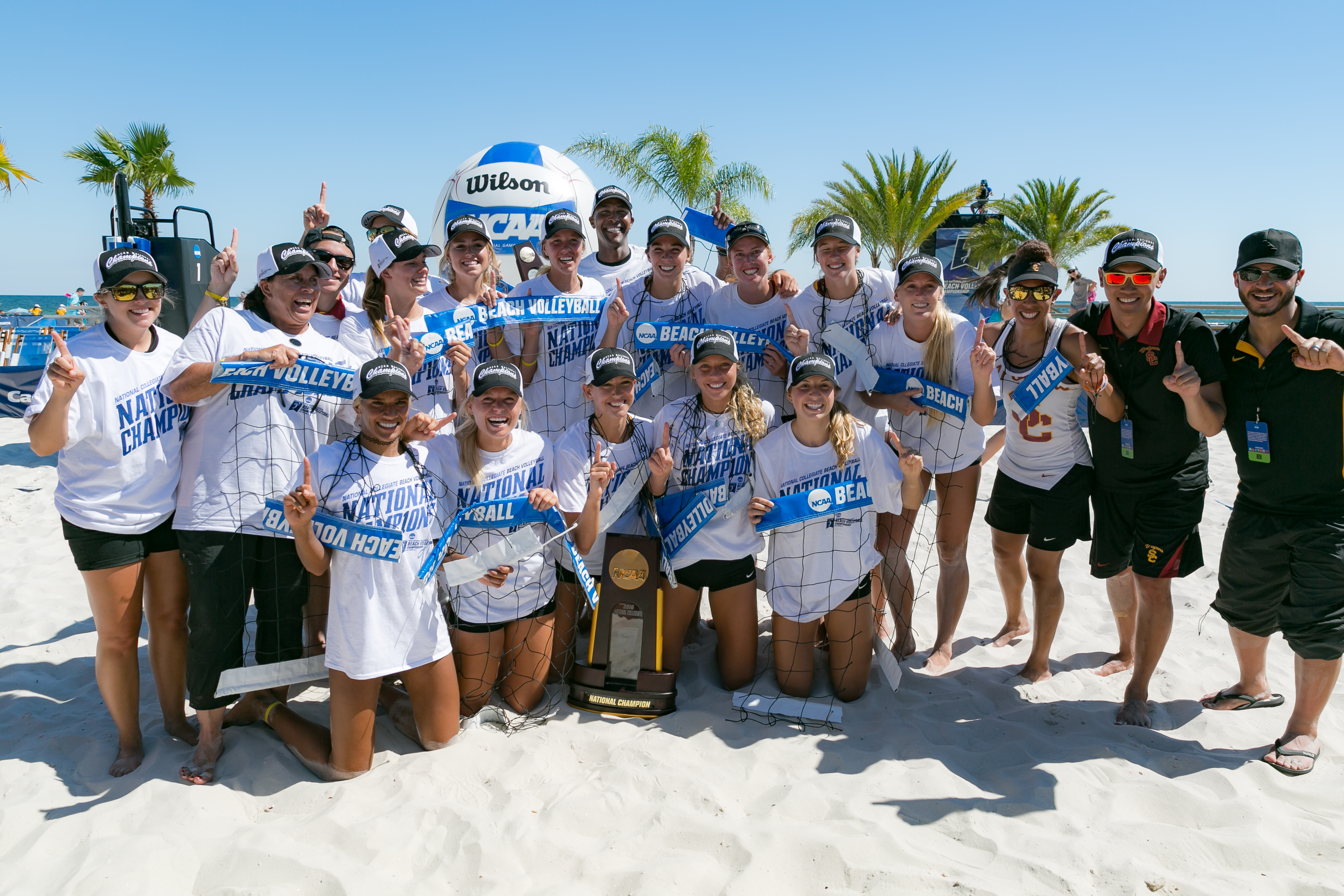
Hughes (fourth from the right) with her USC teammates and coaches after winning the inaugural 2016 NCAA Beach Volleyball Championship

Regarded as one of the top high school recruits for both beach and indoor, Hughes committed to playing beach volleyball for the USC Trojans in her junior year of high school. Beach volleyball had just become an NCAA Emerging Sport for Women at the time and Hughes decided to forgo collegiate indoor volleyball as "sand was [her] real passion."

Hughes joined the Trojans in the 2013–14 season, partnering with Kirby Burnham as the top-flight pair throughout her freshman year. The duo won the AVCA Pairs Championship and recorded 42 wins and 4 losses by the end the season. She was teamed with Claes as the Trojan's top-flight pair for the next three seasons. As sophomores, Hughes and Claes won the AVCA Pairs title and led the Trojans to their first AVCA National Championship, completing the season with a 44–3 win–loss record. In their junior year, they won the inaugural Pac-12 Pairs Championship and were named the Pac-12 Pair of the Year. Women's beach volleyball was also promoted to an NCAA Championship sport that year, and Hughes and Claes helped the Trojans win the first-ever NCAA Beach Volleyball Championship, defeating the Florida State Seminoles' top pair in straight sets in the finals. They ended the season with an undefeated 48–0 record and were selected to the NCAA All-Tournament Team. Hughes and Claes capped off a dominant year by winning the 2016 World University Championships without dropping a set the entire tournament. As seniors, the duo repeated as Pac-12 Pairs Champions and were once again named Pair of Year. They led the Trojans to their second consecutive NCAA title, coming back from a first set loss in the finals to beat the top-flight duo from Pepperdine. Hughes and Claes completed their senior year with a 55–1 win–loss record, amassing an overall record of 147 wins and 4 losses in their three seasons together.

Between their sophomore and senior years, Hughes and Claes had a win streak of 103 collegiate matches, losing just seven sets during this run. Their streak began in April 2015 and was broken two years later in a three-set loss to a team from the Saint Mary's Gaels. Hughes was named an AVCA Division I Collegiate Beach All-American in all her four years of college. She graduated with a Bachelor's degree in business administration in 2017, and earned a Master's degree in Entrepreneurship and Innovation the following year.

== Amateur career ==
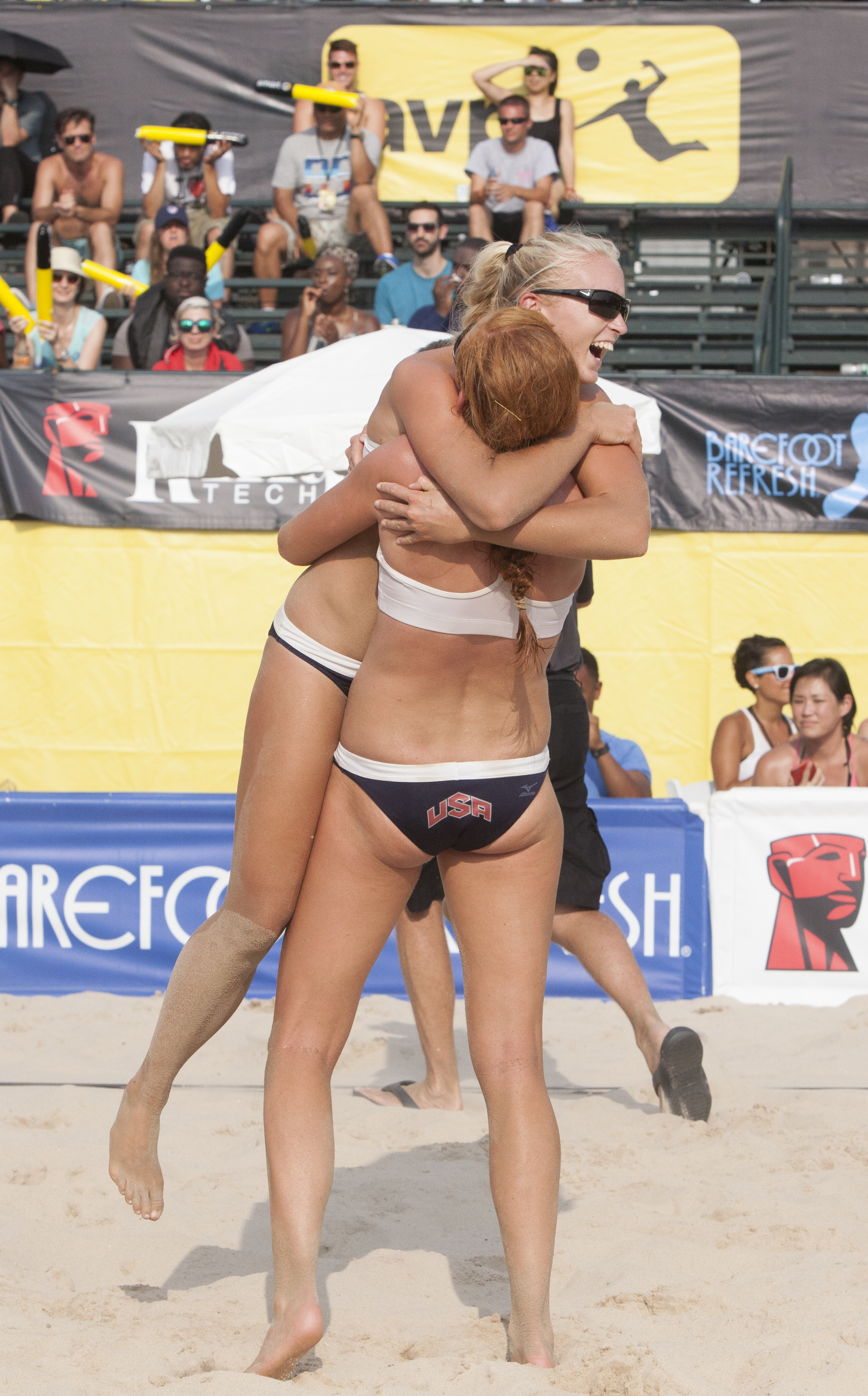
Hughes (being lifted up) and Claes (back turned) celebrate at the 2015 AVP New York Open

While still in high school and college, Hughes competed as an amateur on the domestic and international professional tours. Her first professional tournament result was a 17th place at the 2011 Manhattan Beach Open. In October 2012, she debuted in her first FIVB World Tour event at the $190K Bangsaen Thailand Open, where she and teammate Kaitlin Nielsen lost in the first round of the country quota qualifier. Hughes partnered with Lane Carico to win her first international event the following year at the $8K NORCECA tournament in Boquerón, Cabo Rojo. She made her Association of Volleyball Professionals (AVP) debut playing with Geena Urango at the $75K Milwaukee Open in 2014, but did not progress past the qualifying rounds. After partnering with Kelly Claes, her results improved over the next two years, highlighted by three more NORCECA titles and two AVP semifinal appearances.

Their breakthrough came in June 2016, when Hughes and Claes narrowly lost to Olympians April Ross and Kerri Walsh Jennings with a score of 21–17, 18–21, 15–17 in the third round of the $75K AVP San Francisco Open. Despite the loss, they eventually made it to the finals of the double-elimination tournament where they were defeated once again by A. Ross and Walsh Jennings. Hughes and Claes were given a wild card entry into the main draw of the $400K Klagenfurt Major a month later, where they upset the top-seeded German team of Kira Walkenhorst and Laura Ludwig in the group stage, eventually finishing 17th; Walkenhorst and Ludwig would go on to win gold at the 2016 Summer Olympics a few weeks later.

== Professional career ==
=== 2017: Partnering with Claes ===
Hughes turned professional upon graduating from college in the summer of 2017, and turned down a partnership with three-time Olympic gold medalist Walsh Jennings, choosing instead to continue playing with her collegiate partner Claes. In their first professional season, Hughes and Claes got their highest finish in international competition at the $115K Long Beach Presidents Cup exhibition event in July, beating Germany's Walkenhorst and Ludwig in the bronze-medal match. Two weeks later, they were knocked out of the World Championships by eventual champions Walkenhorst and Ludwig for a ninth-place finish. On the AVP, the 12th-seeded pair won their first title at the $112.5K Chicago Championships in September, beating Brooke Sweat and S. Ross in straight sets in the finals. With this win, Hughes and Claes, aged 22 and 21 at the time, became the youngest team in history to win an AVP tournament. On the World Tour, their best results were fifth-place finishes at the $150K Rio de Janeiro Open and the $300K Poreč Major. Hughes and Claes ended the year ranked No. 16 in the world.

=== 2018–2019: Partnering with S. Ross ===
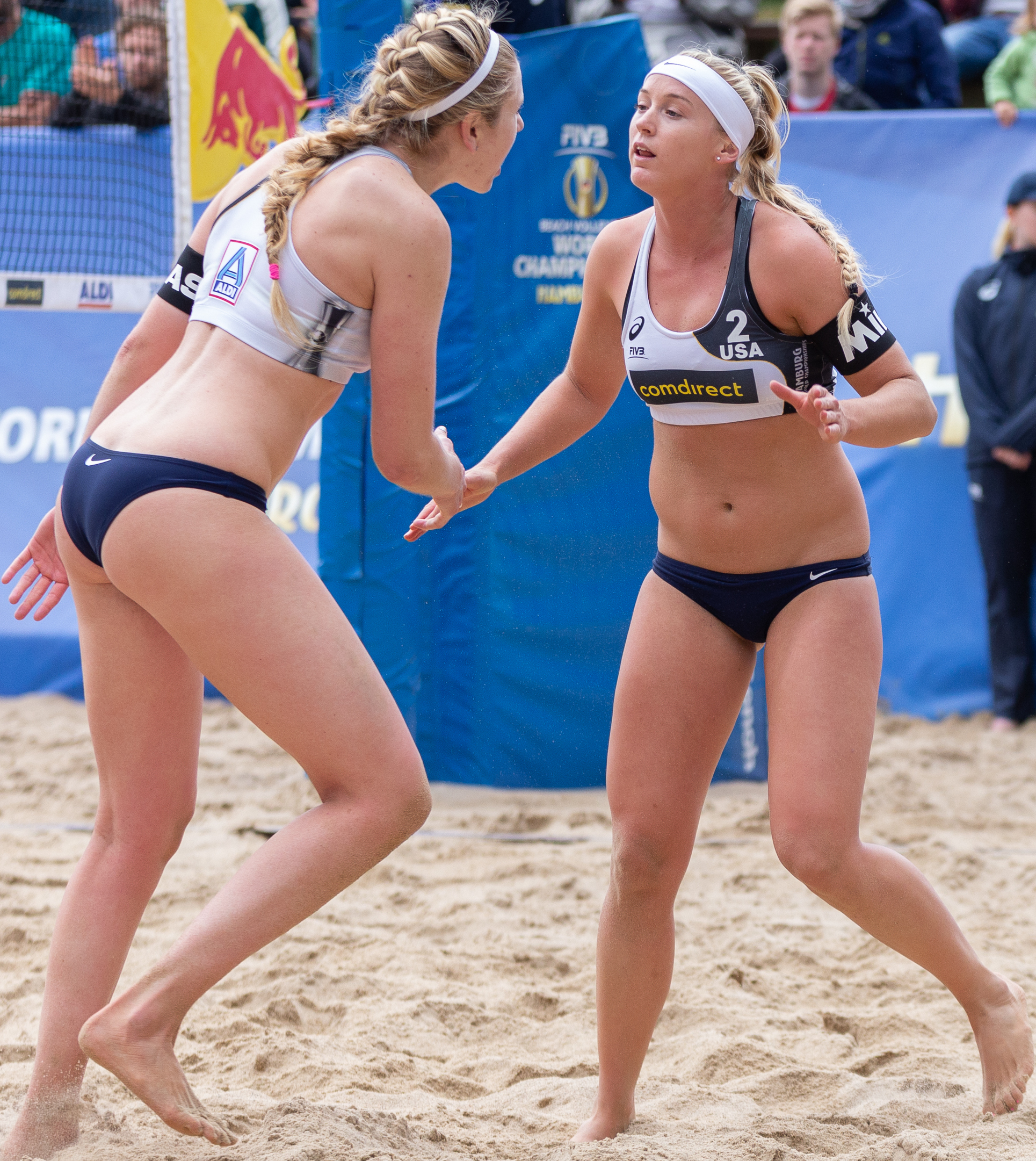
Hughes (right) with Ross at the 2019 World Championships

After ninth-place finishes in their first two World Tour tournaments of 2018, Hughes ended her partnership with Claes to team up with S. Ross. According to Hughes, she made the switch because she "needed to grow a little more as a volleyball player." Hughes and S. Ross entered the AVP season as the top seeds, winning two of the four events they competed in. They won their first tournament together at the $100K AVP New York Open in June by defeating Nicole Branagh and Brandie Wilkerson in the final match in two sets. The following month, they beat A. Ross and Alix Klineman in three sets to win another AVP title at the $79K Hermosa Beach Open. The duo were runners-up to A. Ross and Klineman at the $125K Chicago Championships and the $75K Hawaii Invitational in September.

Hughes and S. Ross also reached their first podium on the World Tour by taking the bronze medal at the $150K Espinho Open in July. The pair then won their first World Tour title the next month at the $150K Moscow Open. Seeded ninth in Moscow, they upset three of the top five seeds, beating the second-seeded Brazilian team of Ágatha Bednarczuk and Eduarda Santos Lisboa in the gold-medal match. After Moscow, Hughes and S. Ross were ranked No. 9 in the world, a career-best for Hughes. They were awarded a wild card entry to the World Tour Finals in Hamburg at the end of the season, in which the eight top-ranked teams and two wild cards compete for the $400K prize pool. As the tenth seeds in the Finals, they notched victories over the top-seeded German team of Chantal Laboureur and Julia Sude and the eight-seeded Dutch team of Sanne Keizer and Madelein Meppelink. However, losses to the fifth-seeded Heather Bansley and Brandie Wilkerson of Canada and the fourth-seeded Maria Antonelli and Carolina Solberg Salgado of Brazil meant they did not progress to the quarterfinals, finishing tied for seventh place. Hughes and S. Ross concluded 2018 with a third-place finish at the $150K Yangzhou Open, defeating Canada's Sarah Pavan and Melissa Humana-Paredes in the bronze-medal match.

=== Accolades ===
Hughes is the 2017 FIVB Top Rookie and the 2018 AVP Best Defender. She and Claes were named Sportswomen of the Year at the 2017 LA Sports Awards, organized by the Los Angeles Sports Council.

== Style of play ==
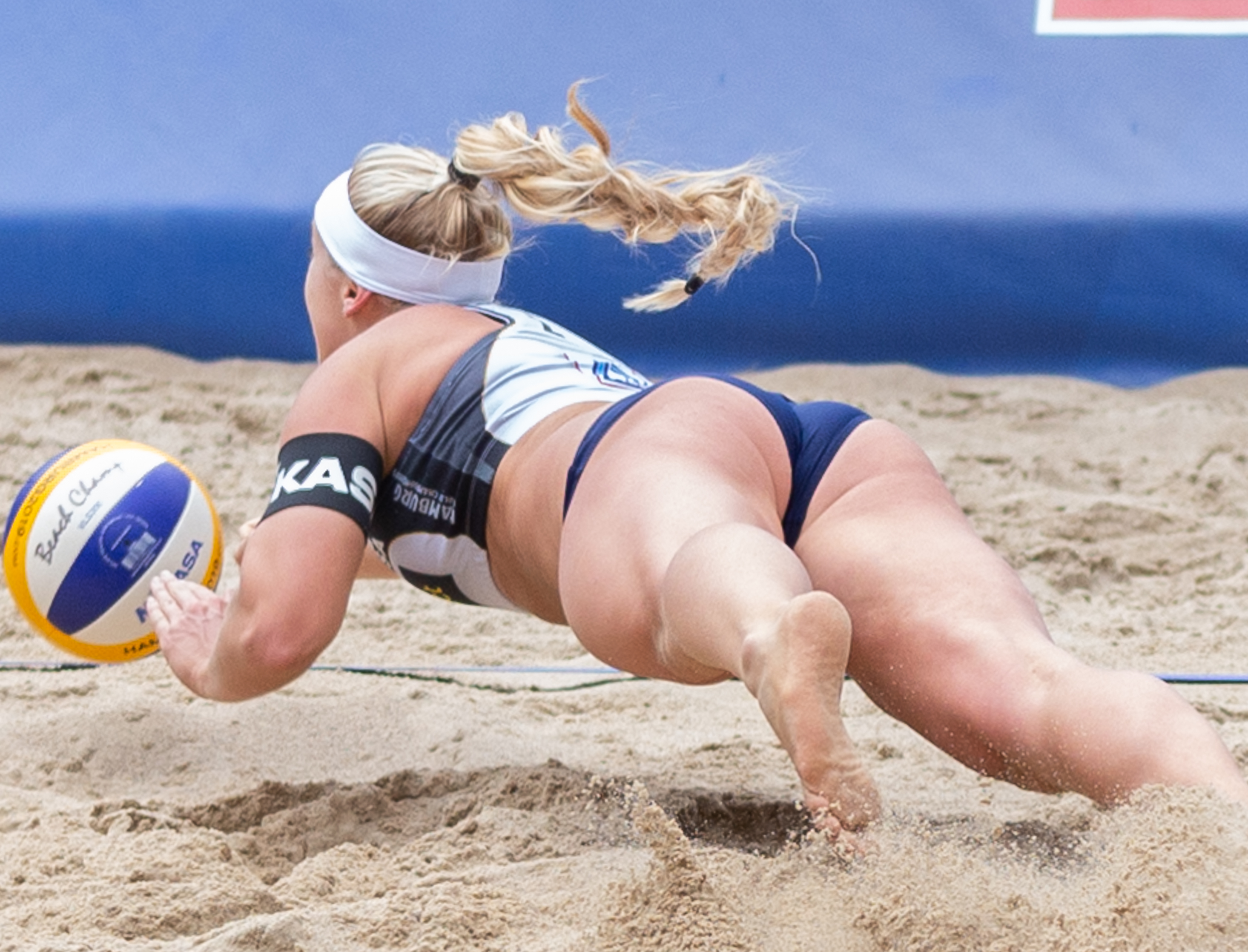
Hughes digging the ball

Hughes is a defender and right-handed right-side player. Originally a blocker in her youth, she moved to the backcourt when she started playing with the taller Claes. Known as a fierce competitor, Hughes has been noted for her "speed and relentless pursuit of every ball." Her USC head coach Anna Collier described her as "one of the fastest and smartest defenders," with the ability to anticipate her opponents' attacks. According to three-time Olympian Holly McPeak, Hughes possesses the competitive drive, work ethic and athleticism necessary to compete at the professional level.

Of the 87 players who competed in a Major Series main draw on the 2018 World Tour, Hughes ranked 33rd for total points scored, averaging 5.61 points per set; 25th for total kills, averaging 5.21 kills per set; and 40th for number of aces, with around four percent of her serves being aces.

== Personal life ==
Hughes' childhood idol was Misty May-Treanor, and she grew up with a poster of the three-time Olympic gold medalist in her bedroom. May-Treanor, who often trained in Huntington Beach when Hughes was young, would occasionally let the latter help with her practice sessions. May-Treanor was later the volunteer assistant coach for the USC Trojans during Hughes' freshman year, and the two have formed a close relationship according to Hughes. A ball girl at AVP tournaments in her youth, Hughes also came to know two-time Olympic medalist April Ross. A. Ross, a fellow Costa Mesa resident, would invite Hughes to her practices when Hughes was in high school.

When Hughes and Claes were just starting to compete on the professional circuits, their biggest challenge was not being able to afford a coach. As their tournament results improved, the pair received more financial assistance from USA Volleyball and began working with Volleyball Hall of Fame inductee José Loiola. Since splitting with Claes in early 2018, Hughes and new partner S. Ross continue to be coached by Loiola. She is sponsored by Mikasa Sports, Oakley, KT Tape, and Nike.

== Career statistics ==
=== FIVB finals: 1 (1–0) ===
Legend
$400,000 tournaments (0–0)
$300,000 tournaments (0–0)
$150,000 tournaments (1–0)
$100–125,000 tournaments (0–0)
$75–80,000 tournaments (0–0)

Result	W–L	Date	Tournament	Tier	Partner	Opponents	Score
Win	1–0	Aug 2018	Moscow, Russia	$150K	Summer Ross	(Brazil) Ágatha Bednarczuk (Brazil) Eduarda Santos Lisboa	21–19, 12–21, 15–12 (0:45)

=== AVP finals: 6 (3–3) ===
Legend
$400,000 tournaments (0–0)
$300,000 tournaments (0–0)
$150,000 tournaments (0–0)
$100–125,000 tournaments (2–1)
$75–80,000 tournaments (1–2)

Result	W–L	Date	Tournament	Tier	Partner	Opponents	Score
Loss	0–1	Jun 2016	San Francisco, California	$75K	Kelly Claes	April Ross; Kerri Walsh Jennings	17–21, 13–21 (0:53)
Win	1–1	Sep 2017	Chicago, Illinois	$112.5K	Kelly Claes	Summer Ross; Brooke Sweat	21–17, 21–18 (0:45)
Win	2–1	Jun 2018	New York City, New York	$100K	Summer Ross	Nicole Branagh; Brandie Wilkerson	21–14, 21–19 (0:52)
Win	3–1	Jul 2018	Hermosa Beach, California	$79K	Summer Ross	April Ross; Alix Klineman	19–21, 21–19, 17–15 (1:28)
Loss	3–2	Sep 2018	Chicago, Illinois	$125K	Summer Ross	April Ross; Alix Klineman	23–25, 16–21 (0:54)
Loss	3–3	Sep 2018	Waikiki, Hawaii	$75K	Summer Ross	April Ross; Alix Klineman	21–18, 19–21, 10–15 (0:59)

=== Performance timeline ===
Key

W	Won	F	Finalist	SF	Semi-finalist
QF	Quarter-finalist	#R	Rounds 4, 3, 2, 1	RR	Round-robin stage
Q#	Qualification round	A	Absent	w/d	Withdrew
G	Gold	S	Silver	B	Bronze
NH	Not held	N/A	Not applicable	DNQ	Did not qualify

Current through the 2018 FIVB World Tour Finals.

Tournament	2015	2016	2017	2018	SR	W–L	Win %
World Championships
World Championships	A	NH	2R	NH	0 / 1	3–2	60%
Grand Slam tournaments (discontinued in 2017)
Long Beach	Q1	2R	NH	NH	0 / 1	2–3	40%
Major Series tournaments
A1 Major Klagenfurt	NH	1R	NH	NH	0 / 1	2–2	50%
Fort Lauderdale	NH	NH	2R	2R	0 / 2	5–3	63%
Poreč	A	A	QF	NH	0 / 1	4–1	80%
Gstaad	A	A	2R	2R	0 / 2	5–4	56%
Vienna	NH	NH	NH	QF	0 / 1	3–2	60%
World Tour Finals	A	A	A	RR	0 / 1	2–2	50%
Career statistics
Titles / Finals	0 / 0	0 / 0	0 / 0	0 / 0	0 / 0		
Overall win–loss	0–0	4–5	16–9	9–7	24–16		
Year-end ranking	161	60	16	9	60%		

Note: Only main draw results are considered.

Awards
Preceded by Eduarda Santos Lisboa (BRA)	Women's FIVB World Tour "Top Rookie"; 2017	Succeeded by Tina Graudiņa (LAT); Svetlana Kholomina (RUS)
