= 2016 FIVB Beach Volleyball World Tour =

Tournament details
- Host country: Various
- Dates: October, 2015 – September, 2016
- Venues: 20 (in 20 host cities)

The 2016 FIVB Beach Volleyball World Tour was the global elite professional beach volleyball circuit organized by the Fédération Internationale de Volleyball (FIVB) for the 2016 beach volleyball season. The 2016 FIVB Beach Volleyball World Tour Calendar comprised four FIVB World Tour Grand Slams, 13 Open tournaments (Doha and Kish Island only for men) and four Major Series events, organised by the Swatch Beach Volleyball Major Series.

The second edition of the Swatch Beach Volleyball FIVB World Tour Finals was held in Toronto, Canada September 13–18, 2016.

== Schedule ==
Key

World Tour Finals
Grand Slam
Major Series
Open tournaments

=== Men ===
Tournament	Champions	Runners-up	Third place	Fourth place
Puerto Vallarta Open; Puerto Vallarta, Mexico; 6–11 October 2015	Phil Dalhausser (USA); Nicholas Lucena (USA); 21–12, 21–18	Alexander Brouwer (NED); Robert Meeuwsen (NED)	Bennet Poniewaz (GER); David Poniewaz (GER); 10–21, 21–18, 15–12	Markus Böckermann (GER); Lars Flüggen (GER)
Antalya Open (1); Antalya, Turkey; 20–25 October 2015	Adrian Carambula (ITA); Alex Ranghieri (ITA); 21–19, 21–16	Lombardo Ontiveros (MEX); Juan Virgen (MEX)	Mārtiņš Pļaviņš (LAT); Haralds Regža (LAT); 21–15, 21–17	Esteban Grimalt (CHI); Marco Grimalt (CHI)
Qatar Open (1); Doha, Qatar; 9–13 November 2015	Markus Böckermann (GER); Lars Flüggen (GER); 21–18, 16–21, 15–13	Phil Dalhausser (USA); Nicholas Lucena (USA)	Tri Bourne (USA); John Hyden (USA); 21–15, 20–22, 15–12	Youssef Krou (FRA); Édouard Rowlandson (FRA)
Kish Island Open; Kish Island, Iran; 15–19 February	Jefferson Pereira (QAT); Cherif Younousse (QAT); 21–13, 14–21, 15–12	Oleg Stoyanovskiy (RUS); Artem Yarzutkin (RUS)	Piotr Kantor (POL); Bartosz Łosiak (POL); 21–19, 15–21, 15–11	Michał Kądzioła (POL); Jakub Szałankiewicz (POL)
Maceió Open; Maceió, Brazil; 23–28 February	Phil Dalhausser (USA); Nicholas Lucena (USA); 21–19, 19–21, 15–12	Evandro Oliveira (BRA); Pedro Solberg Salgado (BRA)	Gustavo Carvalhaes (BRA); Saymon Santos (BRA); 21–18, 25–23	Álvaro Morais Filho (BRA); Vitor Felipe (BRA)
Rio Grand Slam; Rio de Janeiro, Brazil; 8–13 March	Piotr Kantor (POL); Bartosz Łosiak (POL); 21–19, 23–21	Evandro Oliveira (BRA); Pedro Solberg Salgado (BRA)	Alexander Brouwer (NED); Robert Meeuwsen (NED); 19–21, 21–19, 20–18	Grzegorz Fijałek (POL); Mariusz Prudel (POL)
Vitória Open; Vitória, Brazil; 15–20 March	Alison Cerutti (BRA); Bruno Oscar Schmidt (BRA); 21–13, 21–18	Paolo Nicolai (ITA); Daniele Lupo (ITA)	Alexander Brouwer (NED); Robert Meeuwsen (NED); 21–18, 21–15	Adrian Carambula (ITA); Alex Ranghieri (ITA)
Qatar Open (2); Doha, Qatar; 4–8 April	Adrian Carambula (ITA); Alex Ranghieri (ITA); 21–17, 21–19	Alexander Huber (AUT); Robin Seidl (AUT)	Piotr Kantor (POL); Bartosz Łosiak (POL); Walkover	Markus Böckermann (GER); Lars Flüggen (GER)
Xiamen Open; Xiamen, China; 12–17 April	Pablo Herrera (ESP); Adrián Gavira (ESP); 14–21, 21–19, 15–12	John Hyden (USA); Tri Bourne (USA)	Viacheslav Krasilnikov (RUS); Konstantin Semenov (RUS); 21–15, 24–22	Juan Virgen (MEX); Lombardo Ontiveros (MEX)
Fuzhou Open; Fuzhou, China; 19–24 April	Phil Dalhausser (USA); Nicholas Lucena (USA); 21–18, 21–15	Paolo Nicolai (ITA); Daniele Lupo (ITA)	Pablo Herrera (ESP); Adrián Gavira (ESP); 17–21, 21–19, 15–12	Aleksandrs Samoilovs (LAT); Jānis Šmēdiņš (LAT)
Fortaleza Open; Fortaleza, Brazil; 26 April – 1 May	Oscar Brandão (BRA); André Stein (BRA); 15–21, 21–18, 11–5 (ret.)	Jonathan Erdmann (GER); Kay Matysik (GER)	Lombardo Ontiveros (MEX); Juan Virgen (MEX); 23–21, 21–17	Esteban Grimalt (CHI); Marco Grimalt (CHI)
Sochi Open presented by VTB; Sochi, Russia; 3–8 May	Paolo Nicolai (ITA); Daniele Lupo (ITA); 21–15, 21–18	Viacheslav Krasilnikov (RUS); Konstantin Semenov (RUS)	Tri Bourne (USA); John Hyden (USA); 21–19, 19–21, 15–9	Adrian Carambula (ITA); Alex Ranghieri (ITA)
Antalya Open (2); Antalya, Turkey; 10–15 May	Aleksandrs Samoilovs (LAT); Jānis Šmēdiņš (LAT); Walkover	Markus Böckermann (GER); Lars Flüggen (GER)	Grzegorz Fijałek (POL); Mariusz Prudel (POL); 21–14, 21–13	Georgios Kotsilianos (GRE); Nikos Zoupanis (GRE)
Cincinnati Open; Cincinnati, USA; 17–21 May	Gustavo Carvalhaes (BRA); Saymon Santos (BRA); 22–20, 21–8	Josh Binstock (CAN); Sam Schachter (CAN)	Phil Dalhausser (USA); Nicholas Lucena (USA); 21–15, 21–16	John Mayer (USA); Ryan Doherty (USA)
Moscow Grand Slam; Moscow, Russia; 24–29 May	Reinder Nummerdor (NED); Christiaan Varenhorst (NED); 21–19, 7–21, 17–15	Alison Cerutti (BRA); Bruno Oscar Schmidt (BRA)	Piotr Kantor (POL); Bartosz Łosiak (POL); 19–21, 22–20, 15–12	Jake Gibb (USA); Casey Patterson (USA)
smart Major Hamburg; Hamburg, Germany; 7–12 June	Nicholas Lucena (USA); Phil Dalhausser (USA); 29–27, 21–12	Alexander Brouwer (NED); Robert Meeuwsen (NED)	Konstantin Semenov (RUS); Viacheslav Krasilnikov (RUS); 15–21, 22–20, 15–10	Alison Cerutti (BRA); Bruno Oscar Schmidt (BRA)
Olsztyn Grand Slam; Olsztyn, Poland; 15–19 June	Aleksandrs Samoilovs (LAT); Jānis Šmēdiņš (LAT); 21–19, 21–15	Alison Cerutti (BRA); Bruno Oscar Schmidt (BRA)	Gustavo Carvalhaes (BRA); Saymon Santos (BRA); 21–15, 19–21, 15–11	Jake Gibb (USA); Casey Patterson (USA)
Poreč Major; Poreč, Croatia; 28 June – 3 July	Alison Cerutti (BRA); Bruno Oscar Schmidt (BRA); 21–13, 16–21, 15–12	Clemens Doppler (AUT); Alexander Horst (AUT)	Chaim Schalk (CAN); Ben Saxton (CAN); 19–21, 30–28, 20–18	Aleksandrs Samoilovs (LAT); Jānis Šmēdiņš (LAT)
Gstaad Major; Gstaad, Switzerland; 5–10 July	Evandro Oliveira (BRA); Pedro Solberg Salgado (BRA); 24–22, 21–16	Phil Dalhausser (USA); Nicholas Lucena (USA)	Aleksandrs Samoilovs (LAT); Jānis Šmēdiņš (LAT); 21–14, 34–32	Pablo Herrera (ESP); Adrián Gavira (ESP)
A1 Major Klagenfurt; Klagenfurt, Austria; 26–31 July	Aleksandrs Samoilovs (LAT); Jānis Šmēdiņš (LAT); 21–18, 21–18	Gustavo Carvalhaes (BRA); Saymon Santos (BRA)	Chaim Schalk (CAN); Ben Saxton (CAN); 23–21, 17–21, 15–12	Bartosz Łosiak (POL); Michał Bryl (POL)
Long Beach Grand Slam; Long Beach, USA; 24–28 August	Evandro Oliveira (BRA); Pedro Solberg Salgado (BRA); 21–19, 17–21, 15–9	Phil Dalhausser (USA); Nicholas Lucena (USA)	Aleksandrs Samoilovs (LAT); Jānis Šmēdiņš (LAT); 21–18, 21–19	Alex Ranghieri (ITA); Marco Caminati (ITA)
Swatch FIVB World Tour Finals; Toronto, Canada; 13–18 September	Alison Cerutti (BRA); Bruno Oscar Schmidt (BRA); 21–19, 21–19	Evandro Oliveira (BRA); Pedro Solberg Salgado (BRA)	Tri Bourne (USA); John Hyden (USA); 21–14, 22–20	Chaim Schalk (CAN); Ben Saxton (CAN)

=== Women ===
Tournament	Champions	Runners-up	Third place	Fourth place
Puerto Vallarta Open; Puerto Vallarta, Mexico; 6–11 October 2015	Laura Ludwig (GER); Kira Walkenhorst (GER); 21–18, 21–16	Eduarda Lisboa (BRA); Elize Maia (BRA)	Marta Menegatti (ITA); Viktoria Orsi Toth (ITA); 21–18, 21–15	Jantine van der Vlist (NED); Sophie van Gestel (NED)
Antalya Open (1); Antalya, Turkey; 20–25 October 2015	Barbora Hermannová (CZE); Markéta Sluková (CZE); 21–15, 21–17	Marta Menegatti (ITA); Viktoria Orsi Toth (ITA)	Emily Day (USA); Jennifer Kessy (USA); 18–21, 21–14, 15–13	Ana Gallay (ARG); Georgina Klug (ARG)
Maceió Open; Maceió, Brazil; 23–28 February	Eduarda Lisboa (BRA); Elize Maia (BRA); 21–10, 21–13	Madelein Meppelink (NED); Marleen van Iersel (NED)	Ágatha Bednarczuk (BRA); Bárbara Seixas (BRA); 21–13, 21–15	Ana Gallay (ARG); Georgina Klug (ARG)
Rio Grand Slam; Rio de Janeiro, Brazil; 8–13 March	Kerri Walsh Jennings (USA); April Ross (USA); 21–15, 21–13	Kinga Kołosińska (POL); Monika Brzostek (POL)	Karla Borger (GER); Britta Büthe (GER); 21–18, 18–21, 15–10	Isabelle Forrer (SUI); Anouk Vergé-Dépré (SUI)
Vitória Open; Vitória, Brazil; 15–20 March	Larissa França (BRA); Talita Antunes (BRA); 22–20, 21–19	Kerri Walsh Jennings (USA); April Ross (USA)	Katrin Holtwick (GER); Ilka Semmler (GER); 20–22, 21–17, 15–11	Louise Bawden (AUS); Taliqua Clancy (AUS)
Xiamen Open; Xiamen, China; 12–17 April	Isabelle Forrer (SUI); Anouk Vergé-Dépré (SUI); 21–17, 21–14	Barbara Hansel (AUT); Stefanie Schwaiger (AUT)	Kerri Walsh Jennings (USA); April Ross (USA); 24–22, 21–15	Chantal Laboureur (GER); Julia Sude (GER)
Fuzhou Open; Fuzhou, China; 19–24 April	Kerri Walsh Jennings (USA); April Ross (USA); 21–15, 21–15	Chantal Laboureur (GER); Julia Sude (GER)	Joana Heidrich (SUI); Nadine Zumkehr (SUI); Walkover	Isabelle Forrer (SUI); Anouk Vergé-Dépré (SUI)
Fortaleza Open; Fortaleza, Brazil; 26 April – 1 May	Eduarda Lisboa (BRA); Elize Maia (BRA); 21–17, 21–18	Juliana Silva (BRA); Taiana Lima (BRA)	Rebecca Silva (BRA); Liliane Maestrini (BRA); 21–19, 21–19	Linline Matauatu (VAN); Miller Pata (VAN)
Sochi Open presented by VTB; Sochi, Russia; 3–8 May	Joana Heidrich (SUI); Nadine Zumkehr (SUI); 21–11, 19–21, 15–7	Liliana Fernández (ESP); Elsa Baquerizo (ESP)	Katrin Holtwick (GER); Ilka Semmler (GER); 20–22, 21–15, 15–10	Marta Menegatti (ITA); Viktoria Orsi Toth (ITA)
Antalya Open (2); Antalya, Turkey; 10–14 May	Laura Ludwig (GER); Kira Walkenhorst (GER); 23–21, 21–16	Riikka Lehtonen (FIN); Taru Lahti (FIN)	Katrin Holtwick (GER); Ilka Semmler (GER); 21–18, 21–16	Ana Gallay (ARG); Georgina Klug (ARG)
Cincinnati Open; Cincinnati, USA; 17–21 May	Kerri Walsh Jennings (USA); April Ross (USA); 20–22, 21–14, 18–16	Xue Chen (CHN); Xia Xinyi (CHN)	Liliana Fernández (ESP); Elsa Baquerizo (ESP); 21–17, 21–18	Jantine van der Vlist (NED); Sophie van Gestel (NED)
Moscow Grand Slam; Moscow, Russia; 24–29 May	Kerri Walsh Jennings (USA); April Ross (USA); 22–20, 21–17	Larissa França (BRA); Talita Antunes (BRA)	Sarah Pavan (CAN); Heather Bansley (CAN); 21–16, 21–18	Juliana Silva (BRA); Taiana Lima (BRA)
smart Major Hamburg; Hamburg, Germany; 7–11 June	Laura Ludwig (GER); Kira Walkenhorst (GER); 21–19, 19–21, 15–12	Ágatha Bednarczuk (BRA); Bárbara Seixas (BRA)	Larissa França (BRA); Talita Antunes (BRA); 21–15, 21–17	Kerri Walsh Jennings (USA); April Ross (USA)
Olsztyn Grand Slam; Olsztyn, Poland; 14–18 June	Laura Ludwig (GER); Kira Walkenhorst (GER); 21–18, 15–21, 15–10	Larissa França (BRA); Talita Antunes (BRA)	Natália Dubovcová (SVK); Dominika Nestarcová (SVK); 22–20, 21–14	Eduarda Lisboa (BRA); Elize Maia (BRA)
Poreč Major; Poreč, Croatia; 28 June – 2 July	Chantal Laboureur (GER); Julia Sude (GER); 21–19, 21–18	Sarah Pavan (CAN); Heather Bansley (CAN)	Karla Borger (GER); Britta Büthe (GER); 21–19, 21–23, 15–11	Laura Ludwig (GER); Kira Walkenhorst (GER)
Gstaad Major; Gstaad, Switzerland; 5–9 July	Larissa França (BRA); Talita Antunes (BRA); 21–18, 21–14	Kerri Walsh Jennings (USA); April Ross (USA)	Laura Ludwig (GER); Kira Walkenhorst (GER); 21–13, 21–16	Madelein Meppelink (NED); Marleen van Iersel (NED)
A1 Major Klagenfurt; Klagenfurt, Austria; 26–30 July	Laura Ludwig (GER); Kira Walkenhorst (GER); 24–22, 14–21, 15–11	Joana Heidrich (SUI); Nadine Zumkehr (SUI)	Nina Betschart (SUI); Tanja Hüberli (SUI); 14–21, 21–14, 22–20	Ana Gallay (ARG); Georgina Klug (ARG)
Long Beach Grand Slam; Long Beach, USA; 24–28 August	Kerri Walsh Jennings (USA); April Ross (USA); 21–16, 21–16	Liliana Fernández (ESP); Elsa Baquerizo (ESP)	Chantal Laboureur (GER); Julia Sude (GER); 21–16, 21–17	Katrin Holtwick (GER); Ilka Semmler (GER)
Swatch FIVB World Tour Finals; Toronto, Canada; 13–18 September	Laura Ludwig (GER); Kira Walkenhorst (GER); 21–18, 21–16	Joana Heidrich (SUI); Nadine Zumkehr (SUI)	Isabelle Forrer (SUI); Anouk Vergé-Dépré (SUI); 21–19, 21–18	Larissa França (BRA); Talita Antunes (BRA)

== Medal table by country ==
Rank	Nation	Gold	Silver	Bronze	Total
1	Brazil (BRA)	11	11	5	27
2	United States (USA)	9	6	6	21
3	Germany (GER)	8	3	8	19
4	Italy (ITA)	3	3	1	7
5	Latvia (LAT)	3	0	3	6
6	Switzerland (SUI)	2	2	3	7
7	Netherlands (NED)	1	3	2	6
8	Spain (ESP)	1	2	2	5
9	Poland (POL)	1	1	4	6
10	Czech Republic (CZE)	1	0	0	1
10	Qatar (QAT)	1	0	0	1
12	Austria (AUT)	0	3	0	3
13	Canada (CAN)	0	2	3	5
14	Russia (RUS)	0	2	2	4
15	Mexico (MEX)	0	1	1	2
16	China (CHN)	0	1	0	1
16	Finland (FIN)	0	1	0	1
18	Slovakia (SVK)	0	0	1	1
Totals (18 entries)		41	41	41	123
