= 2013 FIVB Beach Volleyball World Tour =

Tournament details
- Host country: Various
- Dates: April – December, 2013
- Venues: 11 (in 11 host cities)

The 2013 FIVB Beach Volleyball World Tour is an international beach volleyball circuit organized by the Fédération Internationale de Volleyball (FIVB).

From this season, the FIVB World Tour calendar comprises the 10 FIVB World Tour Grand Slams and the FIVB Beach Volleyball World Championships.

For the first time since 2002 the competition does not take the name of Swatch, the main sponsor.

== Schedule ==
=== Men ===
Tournament	Champions	Runners-up	Third place	Fourth place
Shanghai Grand Slam; Shanghai, China; 30 April – 4 May	Jake Gibb (USA); Casey Patterson (USA); 21–16, 9–21, 15–9	Pedro Solberg Salgado (BRA); Bruno Oscar Schmidt (BRA)	Ricardo Santos (BRA); Álvaro Morais Filho (BRA); 21–12, 21–10	Michał Kądzioła (POL); Jakub Szałankiewicz (POL)
Corrientes Grand Slam; Corrientes, Argentina; 22 – 26 May	Jānis Šmēdiņš (LAT); Aleksandrs Samoilovs (LAT); 21–16, 21–19	Jake Gibb (USA); Casey Patterson (USA)	Paolo Nicolai (ITA); Daniele Lupo (ITA); 21–13, 23–21	Pedro Solberg Salgado (BRA); Bruno Oscar Schmidt (BRA)
The Hague Grand Slam; The Hague, Netherlands; 11 – 16 June	Pedro Solberg Salgado (BRA); Bruno Oscar Schmidt (BRA); 21–19, 21–12	Jānis Šmēdiņš (LAT); Aleksandrs Samoilovs (LAT)	Grzegorz Fijałek (POL); Mariusz Prudel (POL); 21–18, 21–16	Alexander Huber (AUT); Robin Seidl (AUT)
Rome Grand Slam; Rome, Italy; 18 – 23 June	Phil Dalhausser (USA); Sean Rosenthal (USA); 21–19, 21–18	Jānis Šmēdiņš (LAT); Aleksandrs Samoilovs (LAT)	Pedro Solberg Salgado (BRA); Bruno Oscar Schmidt (BRA); 21–10, 21–11	Alison Cerutti (BRA); Emanuel Rego (BRA)
FIVB World Championships; Stare Jablonki, Poland; 2 – 7 July	Alexander Brouwer (NED); Robert Meeuwsen (NED); 21–18, 21–16	Ricardo Santos (BRA); Álvaro Morais Filho (BRA)	Jonathan Erdmann (GER); Kay Matysik (GER); 21–17, 21–19	Alison Cerutti (BRA); Emanuel Rego (BRA)
Gstaad Grand Slam; Gstaad, Switzerland; 9 – 14 July	Ricardo Santos (BRA); Álvaro Morais Filho (BRA); 21–16, 21–18	Pedro Solberg Salgado (BRA); Bruno Oscar Schmidt (BRA)	Jake Gibb (USA); Casey Patterson (USA); 21–18, 21–18	Alexander Brouwer (NED); Robert Meeuwsen (NED)
Long Beach Grand Slam; Long Beach, United States; 22 – 27 July	Phil Dalhausser (USA); Sean Rosenthal (USA); 21–15, 21–18	Pablo Herrera (ESP); Adrián Gavira (ESP)	Paolo Nicolai (ITA); Daniele Lupo (ITA); 21–16, 21–13	Jake Gibb (USA); Casey Patterson (USA)
Berlin Grand Slam; Berlin, Germany; 6 – 10 August	Vitor Felipe (BRA); Evandro Oliveira (BRA); 21–23, 21–13, 15–10	Konstantin Semenov (RUS); Viacheslav Krasilnikov (RUS)	Pablo Herrera (ESP); Adrián Gavira (ESP); 21–19, 21–16	Andrea Tomatis (ITA); Alex Ranghieri (ITA)
Moscow Grand Slam; Moscow, Russia; 21 – 25 August	Jānis Šmēdiņš (LAT); Aleksandrs Samoilovs (LAT); 21–17, 21–16	Emanuel Rego (BRA); Evandro Oliveira (BRA)	Ricardo Santos (BRA); Álvaro Morais Filho (BRA); 21–15, 21–14	Lorenz Petutschnig (AUT); Alexander Horst (AUT)
São Paulo Grand Slam; São Paulo, Brazil; 8 – 13 October	Pedro Solberg Salgado (BRA); Bruno Oscar Schmidt (BRA); 23–21, 19–21, 15–13	Phil Dalhausser (USA); Casey Jennings (USA)	Jānis Šmēdiņš (LAT); Aleksandrs Samoilovs (LAT); 21–14, 21–12	Pablo Herrera (ESP); Adrián Gavira (ESP)
Xiamen Grand Slam; Xiamen, China; 22 – 26 October	Alison Cerutti (BRA); Vitor Felipe (BRA); 18–21, 21–15, 15–13	Alexander Brouwer (NED); Robert Meeuwsen (NED)	Paolo Nicolai (ITA); Daniele Lupo (ITA); 22–20, 21–19	Jon Stiekema (NED); Christiaan Varenhorst (NED)

=== Women ===
Tournament	Champions	Runners-up	Third place	Fourth place
Shanghai Grand Slam; Shanghai, China; 1 – 5 May	Talita Antunes (BRA); Taiana Lima (BRA); 21–13, 21–11	Doris Schwaiger (AUT); Stefanie Schwaiger (AUT)	Maria Clara Salgado (BRA); Carolina Solberg Salgado (BRA); 16–21, 21–19, 15–8	Madelein Meppelink (NED); Sophie van Gestel (NED)
Corrientes Grand Slam; Corrientes, Argentina; 22 – 26 May	Madelein Meppelink (NED); Sophie van Gestel (NED); 21–17, 21–19	Maria Antonelli (BRA); Agatha Bednarczuk (BRA)	Maria Clara Salgado (BRA); Carolina Solberg Salgado (BRA); 21–16, 18–21, 15–13	Jennifer Kessy (USA); April Ross (USA)
The Hague Grand Slam; The Hague, Netherlands; 11 – 16 June	Talita Antunes (BRA); Taiana Lima (BRA); 21–16, 21–13	Maria Clara Salgado (BRA); Carolina Solberg Salgado (BRA)	Katrin Holtwick (GER); Ilka Semmler (GER); 21–12, 21–14	Jantine van der Vlist (NED); Marloes Wesselink (NED)
Rome Grand Slam; Rome, Italy; 18 – 23 June	Talita Antunes (BRA); Taiana Lima (BRA); 21–17, 19–21, 15–12	Jennifer Kessy (USA); April Ross (USA)	Liliane Maestrini (BRA); Bárbara Seixas (BRA); 21–17, 21–19	Karla Borger (GER); Britta Büthe (GER)
FIVB World Championships; Stare Jablonki, Poland; 1 – 6 July	Xue Chen (CHN); Zhang Xi (CHN); 18–21, 21–17, 21–19	Karla Borger (GER); Britta Büthe (GER)	Liliane Maestrini (BRA); Bárbara Seixas (BRA); 21–18, 21–15	April Ross (USA); Whitney Pavlik (USA)
Gstaad Grand Slam; Gstaad, Switzerland; 9 – 14 July	Xue Chen (CHN); Zhang Xi (CHN); 21–16, 21–14	Liliane Maestrini (BRA); Bárbara Seixas (BRA)	Talita Antunes (BRA); Taiana Lima (BRA); 21–14, 21–13	Laura Ludwig (GER); Kira Walkenhorst (GER)
Long Beach Grand Slam; Long Beach, United States; 22 – 26 July	Talita Antunes (BRA); Taiana Lima (BRA); 20–22, 21–15, 15–13	Maria Clara Salgado (BRA); Carolina Solberg Salgado (BRA)	Katrin Holtwick (GER); Ilka Semmler (GER); 21–18, 25–23	Emily Day (USA); Summer Ross (USA)
Berlin Grand Slam; Berlin, Germany; 7 – 11 August	Talita Antunes (BRA); Taiana Lima (BRA); 16–21, 23–21, 15–12	Katrin Holtwick (GER); Ilka Semmler (GER)	Jennifer Fopma (USA); Brooke Sweat (USA); 21–18, 17–21, 15–12	Kristýna Kolocová (CZE); Markéta Sluková (CZE)
Moscow Grand Slam; Moscow, Russia; 21 – 25 August	Maria Clara Salgado (BRA); Carolina Solberg Salgado (BRA); 21–15, 21–18	Laura Ludwig (GER); Kira Walkenhorst (GER)	Liliana Fernández (ESP); Elsa Baquerizo (ESP); 22–20, 21–19	Marta Menegatti (ITA); Viktoria Orsi Toth (ITA)
São Paulo Grand Slam; São Paulo, Brazil; 8 – 13 October	April Ross (USA); Kerri Walsh Jennings (USA); 19–21, 31–29, 15–12	Laura Ludwig (GER); Kira Walkenhorst (GER)	Maria Antonelli (BRA); Agatha Bednarczuk (BRA); 25–23, 13–21, 15–10	Marta Menegatti (ITA); Viktoria Orsi Toth (ITA)
Xiamen Grand Slam; Xiamen, China; 23 – 27 October	April Ross (USA); Kerri Walsh Jennings (USA); 21–14, 17–21, 15–12	Talita Antunes (BRA); Taiana Lima (BRA)	Laura Ludwig (GER); Kira Walkenhorst (GER); 21–14, 21–19	Katrin Holtwick (GER); Ilka Semmler (GER)

== Medal table by country ==
Rank	Nation	Gold	Silver	Bronze	Total
1	Brazil (BRA)	11	9	9	29
2	United States (USA)	5	3	2	10
3	Latvia (LAT)	2	2	1	5
4	Netherlands (NED)	2	1	0	3
5	China (CHN)	2	0	0	2
6	Germany (GER)	0	4	4	8
7	Spain (ESP)	0	1	2	3
8	Austria (AUT)	0	1	0	1
8	Russia (RUS)	0	1	0	1
10	Italy (ITA)	0	0	3	3
11	Poland (POL)	0	0	1	1
Totals (11 entries)		22	22	22	66

== Open tournaments ==
In this season, the FIVB Open tournaments no longer form part of the World Tour and are considered separate events.

=== Men ===
Tournament	Champions	Runners-up	Third place	Fourth place
Fuzhou Open; Fuzhou, China; 23 – 27 April	Sean Rosenthal (USA); Phil Dalhausser (USA); 21–18, 24–22	Paolo Nicolai (ITA); Daniele Lupo (ITA)	Alexander Huber (AUT); Robin Seidl (AUT); 21–18, 21–18	Ricardo Santos (BRA); Álvaro Morais Filho (BRA)
Anapa Open; Anapa, Russia; 24 – 28 July	Konstantin Semenov (RUS); Yaroslav Koshkarev (RUS); 25–23, 24–26, 15–13	Lars Flüggen (GER); Alexander Walkenhorst (GER)	Alexey Pastukhov (RUS); Viacheslav Krasilnikov (RUS); Forfeit	Finn Dittelbach (GER); Eric Koreng (GER)
Durban Open; Durban, South Africa; 11 – 15 December	Jānis Šmēdiņš (LAT); Aleksandrs Samoilovs (LAT); 15–21, 21–17, 15–10	Mārtiņš Pļaviņš (LAT); Aleksandrs Solovejs (LAT)	Pedro Solberg Salgado (BRA); Bruno Oscar Schmidt (BRA); Forfeit	Přemysl Kubala (CZE); Jan Dumek (CZE)

=== Women ===
Tournament	Champions	Runners-up	Third place	Fourth place
Fuzhou Open; Fuzhou, China; 24 – 28 April	Xue Chen (CHN); Zhang Xi (CHN); 21–14, 21–10	Liliana Fernández (ESP); Elsa Baquerizo (ESP)	Katrin Holtwick (GER); Ilka Semmler (GER); 21–17, 21–18	Madelein Meppelink (NED); Sophie van Gestel (NED)
Anapa Open; Anapa, Russia; 23 – 27 July	Evgenia Ukolova (RUS); Ekaterina Khomyakova (RUS); 21–10, 21–14	Teresa Mersmann (GER); Isabel Schneider (GER)	Maria Prokopeva (RUS); Svetlana Popova (RUS); 21–16, 21–12	Heather Hughes (USA); Kaitlin Sather Nielsen (USA)
Phuket Open; Phuket, Thailand; 29 October – 3 November	Xue Chen (CHN); Xia Xinyi (CHN); 21–16, 21–18	Emily Day (USA); Summer Ross (USA)	Maria Clara Salgado (BRA); Carolina Solberg Salgado (BRA); 21–18, 24–22	Agatha Bednarczuk (BRA); Maria Antonelli (BRA)
Durban Open; Durban, South Africa; 11 – 15 December	Xue Chen (CHN); Xia Xinyi (CHN); 21–18, 21–18	Chantal Laboureur (GER); Julia Sude (GER)	Whitney Pavlik (USA); Jennifer Kessy (USA); 36–34, 21–18	Teresa Mersmann (GER); Isabel Schneider (GER)
