= 2014 FIVB Beach Volleyball World Tour =

Tournament details
- Host country: Various
- Dates: April – December, 2014
- Venues: 18 (in 18 host cities)

The 2014 FIVB Beach Volleyball World Tour is an international beach volleyball circuit organized by the Fédération Internationale de Volleyball (FIVB).

From this season, the FIVB World Tour calendar comprises the 10 FIVB World Tour Grand Slams and 10 Open tournaments. The Phuket Open was originally scheduled for October but was cancelled due to political unrest in Thailand. La Réunion Open (men) and Chennai Open (both gender) were later cancelled also.

The FIVB Open tournaments returned as part of the World Tour.

== Schedule ==
Key

Grand Slam
Open tournaments

=== Men ===
| Tournament | Champions | Runners-up | Third place | Fourth place |
|---|---|---|---|---|
| Fuzhou Open; Fuzhou, China; 22 – 26 April | Paolo Nicolai (ITA); Daniele Lupo (ITA); 21–17, 16–21, 15–13 | Alison Cerutti (BRA); Bruno Oscar Schmidt (BRA) | Jon Stiekema (NED); Christiaan Varenhorst (NED); 17–21, 26–24, 16–14 | Aleksandrs Samoilovs (LAT); Jānis Šmēdiņš (LAT) |
| Shanghai PPTV Grand Slam; Shanghai, China; 29 April – 3 May | Paolo Nicolai (ITA); Daniele Lupo (ITA); 24–26, 21–18, 15–12 | Aleksandrs Samoilovs (LAT); Jānis Šmēdiņš (LAT) | Jonathan Erdmann (GER); Kay Matysik (GER); 15–21, 21–19, 15–10 | Emanuel Rego (BRA); Pedro Solberg Salgado (BRA) |
| Puerto Vallarta Open; Puerto Vallarta, Mexico; 6 – 10 May | Aleksandrs Samoilovs (LAT); Jānis Šmēdiņš (LAT); 21–19, 21–15 | Paolo Ingrosso (ITA); Matteo Ingrosso (ITA) | Juan Virgen (MEX); Lombardo Ontiveros (MEX); 21–16, 18–21, 21–19 | Finn Dittelbach (GER); Eric Koreng (GER) |
| Anapa Open; Anapa, Russia; 28 May – 1 June | Mārtiņš Pļaviņš (LAT); Aleksandrs Solovejs (LAT); 21–16, 24–26, 15–13 | Konstantin Semenov (RUS); Viacheslav Krasilnikov (RUS) | Philip Gabathuler (SUI); Mirco Gerson (SUI); 16–21, 21–17, 16–14 | Sébastien Chevallier (SUI); Alexei Strasser (SUI) |
| Moscow Grand Slam; Moscow, Russia; 11 – 15 June | Konstantin Semenov (RUS); Viacheslav Krasilnikov (RUS); 23–21, 21–17 | Grzegorz Fijałek (POL); Mariusz Prudel (POL) | Phil Dalhausser (USA); Sean Rosenthal (USA); 21–19, 15–21, 15–11 | Paolo Nicolai (ITA); Daniele Lupo (ITA) |
| Berlin smart Grand Slam; Berlin, Germany; 18 – 22 June | John Hyden (USA); Tri Bourne (USA); 21–17, 21–11 | Ryan Doherty (USA); Nicholas Lucena (USA) | Alison Cerutti (BRA); Bruno Oscar Schmidt (BRA); 21–13, 21–12 | Emanuel Rego (BRA); Pedro Solberg Salgado (BRA) |
| Stavanger Grand Slam; Stavanger, Norway; 25 – 29 June | Phil Dalhausser (USA); Sean Rosenthal (USA); 21–16, 21–16 | Ricardo Santos (BRA); Álvaro Morais Filho (BRA) | Philip Gabathuler (SUI); Mirco Gerson (SUI); 28–30, 21–19, 15–9 | Alexey Sidorenko (KAZ); Alexandr Dyachenko (KAZ) |
| Gstaad Grand Slam; Gstaad, Switzerland; 9 – 13 July | Phil Dalhausser (USA); Sean Rosenthal (USA); 21–17, 21–17 | Alison Cerutti (BRA); Bruno Oscar Schmidt (BRA) | Ryan Doherty (USA); Nicholas Lucena (USA); 21–19, 21–16 | Jonathan Erdmann (GER); Kay Matysik (GER) |
| The Hague Transavia Grand Slam; The Hague, Netherlands; 15 – 20 July | Grzegorz Fijałek (POL); Mariusz Prudel (POL); 21–18, 13–21, 15–13 | Phil Dalhausser (USA); Sean Rosenthal (USA) | Emanuel Rego (BRA); Pedro Solberg Salgado (BRA); 12–21, 21–16, 15–11 | Alison Cerutti (BRA); Bruno Oscar Schmidt (BRA) |
| ASICS World Series of Beach Volleyball; Long Beach, California, United States; 22 – 27 July | Phil Dalhausser (USA); Sean Rosenthal (USA); 22–24, 21–17, 15–9 | Grzegorz Fijałek (POL); Mariusz Prudel (POL) | Todd Rogers (USA); Theo Brunner (USA); 21–17, 18–21, 15–12 | Alexander Walkenhorst (GER); Stefan Windscheif (GER) |
| Klagenfurt A1 Grand Slam; Klagenfurt, Austria; 30 July – 3 August | Alison Cerutti (BRA); Bruno Oscar Schmidt (BRA); 21–14, 21–17 | Paolo Nicolai (ITA); Daniele Lupo (ITA) | Isaac Kapa (AUS); Christopher McHugh (AUS); 24–22, 21–17 | Aleksandrs Samoilovs (LAT); Jānis Šmēdiņš (LAT) |
| Stare Jablonki Grand Slam; Stare Jabłonki, Poland; 20 – 24 August | Pedro Solberg Salgado (BRA); Álvaro Morais Filho (BRA); 15–21, 21–17, 15–12 | Aleksandrs Samoilovs (LAT); Jānis Šmēdiņš (LAT) | Jake Gibb (USA); Casey Patterson (USA); 23–21, 21–18 | Clemens Doppler (AUT); Alexander Horst (AUT) |
| São Paulo Grand Slam; São Paulo, Brazil; 23 – 28 September | Reinder Nummerdor (NED); Christiaan Varenhorst (NED); 21–17, 21–13 | Ricardo Santos (BRA); Emanuel Rego (BRA) | Bartosz Łosiak (POL); Piotr Kantor (POL); 21–19, 18–21, 15–12 | Josh Binstock (CAN); Sam Schachter (CAN) |
| Xiamen Open; Xiamen, China; 7 – 11 October | Youssef Krou (FRA); Édouard Rowlandson (FRA); 22–20, 19–21, 15–12 | Francisco Alfredo Marco (ESP); Christian García (ESP) | Nikita Liamin (RUS); Dmitri Barsouk (RUS); 21–18, 21–15 | Theo Brunner (USA); John Mayer (USA) |
| Paraná Open; Paraná, Argentina; 29 October – 2 November | Josh Binstock (CAN); Sam Schachter (CAN); 21–14, 21–12 | Esteban Grimalt (CHI); Marco Grimalt (CHI) | Chaim Schalk (CAN); Ben Saxton (CAN); 21–15, 21–10 | Sebastian Fuchs (GER); Thomas Kaczmarek (GER) |
| Doha Open; Doha, Qatar; 4 – 8 November | Tim Holler (GER); Jonas Schröder (GER); 21–18, 21–13 | Josh Binstock (CAN); Sam Schachter (CAN) | Youssef Krou (FRA); Édouard Rowlandson (FRA); 21–15, 21–15 | Ruslan Bykanov (RUS); Sergey Prokopyev (RUS) |
| Mangaung Open; Mangaung, South Africa; 9 – 14 December | Reinder Nummerdor (NED); Christiaan Varenhorst (NED); 21–18, 21–18 | Esteban Grimalt (CHI); Marco Grimalt (CHI) | Youssef Krou (FRA); Édouard Rowlandson (FRA); 21–16, 21–17 | Sebastian Fuchs (GER); Thomas Kaczmarek (GER) |

=== Women ===
| Tournament | Champions | Runners-up | Third place | Fourth place |
|---|---|---|---|---|
| Fuzhou Open; Fuzhou, China; 23 – 27 April | April Ross (USA); Kerri Walsh Jennings (USA); 21–11, 21–18 | Maria Antonelli (BRA); Juliana Silva (BRA) | Xue Chen (CHN); Xia Xinyi (CHN); 21–19, 21–18 | Maria Clara Salgado (BRA); Carolina Solberg Salgado (BRA) |
| Shanghai PPTV Grand Slam; Shanghai, China; 30 April – 4 May | Laura Ludwig (GER); Kira Walkenhorst (GER); 23–21, 19–21, 15–9 | Wang Fan (CHN); Yue Yuan (CHN) | Agatha Bednarczuk (BRA); Bárbara Seixas (BRA); 21–17, 21–14 | Talita Antunes (BRA); Taiana Lima (BRA) |
| Puerto Vallarta Open; Puerto Vallarta, Mexico; 7 – 11 May | Agatha Bednarczuk (BRA); Bárbara Seixas (BRA); 21–19, 21–18 | Maria Antonelli (BRA); Juliana Silva (BRA) | Xue Chen (CHN); Xia Xinyi (CHN); 21–12, 18–21, 15–13 | Chantal Laboureur (GER); Julia Sude (GER) |
| Prague Open; Prague, Czech Republic; 21 – 25 May | Kristýna Kolocová (CZE); Markéta Sluková (CZE); 21–18, 16–21, 15–12 | Katrin Holtwick (GER); Ilka Semmler (GER) | Laura Ludwig (GER); Kira Walkenhorst (GER); 21–18, 17–21, 15–5 | Doris Schwaiger (AUT); Stefanie Schwaiger (AUT) |
| Anapa Open; Anapa, Russia; 27 – 31 May | Victoria Bieneck (GER); Julia Großner (GER); 22–20, 21–19 | Ekaterina Syrtseva (RUS); Alexandra Moiseeva (RUS) | Evgenia Ukolova (RUS); Maria Prokopeva (RUS); 21–19, 23–21 | Ángela Lobato (ESP); Paula Soria (ESP) |
| Moscow Grand Slam; Moscow, Russia; 11 – 15 June | April Ross (USA); Kerri Walsh Jennings (USA); 21–17, 22–24, 15–13 | Talita Antunes (BRA); Taiana Lima (BRA) | Madelein Meppelink (NED); Marleen van Iersel (NED); 21–19, 18–21, 15–12 | Liliana Fernández (ESP); Elsa Baquerizo (ESP) |
| Berlin smart Grand Slam; Berlin, Germany; 17 – 22 June | Kristýna Kolocová (CZE); Markéta Sluková (CZE); 21–14, 18–21, 15–12 | Maria Antonelli (BRA); Juliana Silva (BRA) | Karla Borger (GER); Britta Büthe (GER); 21–10, 21-19 | Wang Fan (CHN); Yue Yuan (CHN) |
| Stavanger Grand Slam; Stavanger, Norway; 24 – 28 June | April Ross (USA); Kerri Walsh Jennings (USA); 21–12, 21–15 | Liliana Fernández (ESP); Elsa Baquerizo (ESP) | Natália Dubovcová (SVK); Dominika Nestarcová (SVK); 21–19, 16–21, 15–12 | Madelein Meppelink (NED); Marleen van Iersel (NED) |
| Gstaad Grand Slam; Gstaad, Switzerland; 8 – 13 July | Katrin Holtwick (GER); Ilka Semmler (GER); 24–22, 21–16 | Karla Borger (GER); Britta Büthe (GER) | Kristýna Kolocová (CZE); Markéta Sluková (CZE); 27–25, 21–19 | Maria Antonelli (BRA); Juliana Silva (BRA) |
| The Hague Transavia Grand Slam; The Hague, Netherlands; 15 – 20 July | Taiana Lima (BRA); Fernanda Alves (BRA); 21–16, 16–21, 15–12 | Katrin Holtwick (GER); Ilka Semmler (GER) | Maria Antonelli (BRA); Juliana Silva (BRA); 21–13, 21–14 | Kristýna Kolocová (CZE); Markéta Sluková (CZE) |
| ASICS World Series of Beach Volleyball; Long Beach, California, United States; 22 – 27 July | April Ross (USA); Kerri Walsh Jennings (USA); 21–17, 21–17 | Agatha Bednarczuk (BRA); Bárbara Seixas (BRA) | Natália Dubovcová (SVK); Dominika Nestarcová (SVK); 21–19, 12–21, 15–13 | Liliana Fernández (ESP); Elsa Baquerizo (ESP) |
| Klagenfurt A1 Grand Slam; Klagenfurt, Austria; 29 July – 2 August | Larissa França (BRA); Talita Antunes (BRA); 22–20, 21–19 | Maria Antonelli (BRA); Juliana Silva (BRA) | Agatha Bednarczuk (BRA); Bárbara Seixas (BRA); 21–18, 21–18 | Marta Menegatti (ITA); Viktoria Orsi Toth (ITA) |
| Stare Jablonki Grand Slam; Stare Jabłonki, Poland; 19 – 23 August | Larissa França (BRA); Talita Antunes (BRA); 21–14, 19–21, 16–14 | Laura Ludwig (GER); Julia Sude (GER) | Katrin Holtwick (GER); Ilka Semmler (GER); 21–17, 21–16 | Taiana Lima (BRA); Fernanda Alves (BRA) |
| São Paulo Grand Slam; São Paulo, Brazil; 23 – 28 September | Larissa França (BRA); Talita Antunes (BRA); 18–21, 23–21, 21–19 | Marta Menegatti (ITA); Viktoria Orsi Toth (ITA) | Madelein Meppelink (NED); Marleen van Iersel (NED); 21–15, 21–14 | Maria Clara Salgado (BRA); Carolina Solberg Salgado (BRA) |
| Xiamen Open; Xiamen, China; 8 – 12 October | Maria Antonelli (BRA); Juliana Silva (BRA); 20–22, 21–17, 15–13 | Wang Fan (CHN); Yue Yuan (CHN) | Tealle Hunkus (USA); Kendra Vanzwieten (USA); 21–12, 21–15 | Vassiliki Arvaniti (GRE); Maria Tsiartsiani (GRE) |
| Paraná Open; Paraná, Argentina; 28 October – 1 November | Larissa França (BRA); Talita Antunes (BRA); 21–16, 21–17 | Maria Clara Salgado (BRA); Carolina Solberg Salgado (BRA) | Liliane Maestrini (BRA); Rebecca Silva (BRA); 21–8, 21–16 | Irene Hester (USA); Caitlin Ledoux (USA) |
| Mangaung Open; Mangaung, South Africa; 9 – 14 December | Martina Bonnerová (CZE); Barbora Hermannová (CZE); 21–15, 21–17 | Takemi Nishibori (JPN); Sayaka Mizoe (JPN) | Evgenia Ukolova (RUS); Maria Prokopeva (RUS); 21–17, 20–22, 15–12 | Lane Carico (USA); Kimberly Dicello (USA) |

== Medal table by country ==
| Rank | Nation | Gold | Silver | Bronze | Total |
|---|---|---|---|---|---|
| 1 | Brazil (BRA) | 9 | 11 | 6 | 26 |
| 2 | United States (USA) | 8 | 2 | 5 | 15 |
| 3 | Germany (GER) | 4 | 4 | 4 | 12 |
| 4 | Czech Republic (CZE) | 3 | 0 | 1 | 4 |
| 5 | Italy (ITA) | 2 | 3 | 0 | 5 |
| 6 | Latvia (LAT) | 2 | 2 | 0 | 4 |
| 7 | Netherlands (NED) | 2 | 0 | 3 | 5 |
| 8 | Russia (RUS) | 1 | 2 | 3 | 6 |
| 9 | Poland (POL) | 1 | 2 | 1 | 4 |
| 10 | Canada (CAN) | 1 | 1 | 1 | 3 |
| 11 | France (FRA) | 1 | 0 | 2 | 3 |
| 12 | China (CHN) | 0 | 2 | 2 | 4 |
| 13 | Chile (CHI) | 0 | 2 | 0 | 2 |
| 13 | Spain (ESP) | 0 | 2 | 0 | 2 |
| 15 | Japan (JPN) | 0 | 1 | 0 | 1 |
| 16 | Slovakia (SVK) | 0 | 0 | 2 | 2 |
| 16 | Switzerland (SUI) | 0 | 0 | 2 | 2 |
| 18 | Australia (AUS) | 0 | 0 | 1 | 1 |
| 18 | Mexico (MEX) | 0 | 0 | 1 | 1 |
| Totals (19 entries) | | 34 | 34 | 34 | 102 |
