= 2016 in volleyball =

The following were the events of Volleyball for the year 2016 throughout the world.

== Beach volleyball ==
=== 2016 Summer Olympics (FIVB–BVB) ===
- August 6 – 18: 2016 Summer Olympics for Men and Women in Rio de Janeiro at Copacabana Beach
  - Men:
  - (gold) Brazil (Alison Cerutti & Bruno Oscar Schmidt)
  - (silver) Italy (Daniele Lupo & Paolo Nicolai)
  - (bronze) Netherlands (Alexander Brouwer & Robert Meeuwsen)
  - Women:
  - (gold) Germany (Laura Ludwig & Kira Walkenhorst)
  - (silver) Brazil (Ágatha Bednarczuk & Bárbara Seixas)
  - (bronze) United States (April Ross & Kerri Walsh Jennings)

=== International beach volleyball championships ===
- May 11 – 16: 2016 FIVB Beach Volleyball U21 World Championships in (Switzerland) Lucerne
  - Men: (Brazil) George Souto Maior Wanderley / Arthur Diego Mariano Lanci
  - Women: (Brazil) Eduarda Santos Lisboa / Ana Patricia Silva Ramos
- July 6 – 10: 2016 FIVB World Continental Cup Olympic Qualification in Sochi
  - Men: Both Canada and Russia qualified to compete at Rio 2016.
  - Women: Both the Czech Republic and Russia qualified to compete at Rio 2016.
- July 26 – 31: 2016 FIVB Beach Volleyball U19 World Championships in (Cyprus) Larnaca
  - Men: (Brazil) Renato Andrew Lima de Carvalho / Rafael José Mendonça de Queiroz
  - Women: (Brazil) Eduarda Santos Lisboa / Victoria Lopes Pereira Tosta
- September 13 – 18: 2016 FIVB World Tour Finals in (Canada) Toronto
  - Men: (Brazil) Alison Cerutti / Bruno Oscar Schmidt
  - Women: (Germany) Laura Ludwig / Kira Walkenhorst

=== BV Grand Slam ===
- March 8 – 13: Grand Slam #1 in (Brazil) Rio de Janeiro
  - Men: (Poland) Bartosz Losiak / Piotr Kantor
  - Women: (United States) Kerri Walsh Jennings / April Ross
- May 24 – 29: Grand Slam #2 in (Russia) Moscow
  - Men: (Netherlands) Reinder Nummerdor / Christiaan Varenhorst
  - Women: (United States) Kerri Walsh Jennings / April Ross
- June 14 – 19: Grand Slam #3 in (Poland) Olsztyn
  - Men: (Latvia) Aleksandrs Samoilovs / Jānis Šmēdiņš
  - Women: (Germany) Laura Ludwig / Kira Walkenhorst
- August 23 – 28: Grand Slam #4 (final) in (United States) Long Beach, California
  - Men: (Brazil) Pedro Solberg Salgado / Evandro Oliveira
  - Women: (United States) Kerri Walsh Jennings / April Ross

=== BV Major ===
- June 7 – 12: Major #1 in (Germany) Hamburg
  - Men: (United States) Nicholas Lucena / Phil Dalhausser
  - Women: (Germany) Laura Ludwig / Kira Walkenhorst
- June 28 – July 3: Major #2 in (Croatia) Poreč
  - Men: (Brazil) Alison Cerutti / Bruno Oscar Schmidt
  - Women: (Germany) Julia Sude / Chantal Laboureur
- July 5 – 10: Major #3 in (Switzerland) Gstaad
  - Men: (Brazil) Pedro Solberg Salgado / Evandro Gonçalves Oliveira Júnior
  - Women: (Brazil) Larissa França / Talita Antunes
- July 26 – 31: Major #4 (final) in (Austria) Klagenfurt
  - Men: (Latvia) Aleksandrs Samoilovs / Jānis Šmēdiņš
  - Women: (Germany) Laura Ludwig / Kira Walkenhorst

=== BV Open ===
- February 15 – 19: Open #1 in (Iran) Kish Island (men only)
  - Winners: (Qatar) Jefferson Santos Pereira / Cherif Younousse
- February 23 – 28: Open #2 in (Brazil) Maceió
  - Men: (United States) Phil Dalhausser / Nicholas Lucena
  - Women: (Brazil) Eduarda Santos Lisboa / Elize Secomandi Maia
- March 15 – 20: Open #3 in (Brazil) Vitória, Espírito Santo
  - Men: (Brazil) Alison Cerutti / Bruno Oscar Schmidt
  - Women: (Brazil) Larissa França / Talita Antunes
- April 5 – 8: Open #4 in (Qatar) Doha (men only)
  - Winners: (Italy) Alex Ranghieri / Adrian Ignacio Carambula Raurich
- April 12 – 17: Open #5 in (China) Xiamen
  - Men: (Spain) Pablo Herrera / Adrián Gavira
  - Women: (Switzerland) Isabelle Forrer / Anouk Vergé-Dépré
- April 19 – 24: Open #6 in (China) Fuzhou
  - Men: (United States) Phil Dalhausser / Nicholas Lucena
  - Women: (United States) Kerri Walsh Jennings / April Ross
- April 26 – May 1: Open #7 in (Brazil) Fortaleza
  - Men: (Brazil) Oscar Brandão / Andre Loyola Stein
  - Women: (Brazil) Elize Secomandi Maia / Eduarda Santos Lisboa
- May 3 – 8: Open #8 in (Russia) Sochi
  - Men: (Italy) Paolo Nicolai / Daniele Lupo
  - Women: (Switzerland) Joana Heidrich / Nadine Zumkehr
- May 10 – 15: Open #9 in (Turkey) Antalya
  - Men: (Latvia) Aleksandrs Samoilovs / Jānis Šmēdiņš
  - Women: (Germany) Laura Ludwig / Kira Walkenhorst
- May 17 – 21: Open #10 (final) in (United States) Cincinnati
  - Men: (Brazil) Gustavo Albrecht Carvalhaes / Saymon Barbosa Santos
  - Women: (United States) Kerri Walsh Jennings / April Ross

== Volleyball ==
=== 2016 Summer Olympics (FIVB–VB) ===
- August 6 – 20: 2016 Summer Olympics (Women) in (Brazil) Rio de Janeiro (at the Ginásio do Maracanãzinho)
  - (gold) China; (silver) Serbia; (bronze) United States
- August 7 – 21: 2016 Summer Olympics (Men) in Rio de Janeiro (at the Ginásio do Maracanãzinho)
  - (gold) Brazil; (silver) Italy; (bronze) United States

=== International volleyball events ===
- January 4 – 9: 2016 European Women's Continental Olympic Qualification in (Turkey) Ankara
  - Russia has qualified to compete at Rio 2016.
  - Italy and Netherlands has qualified to compete at FIVB World Qualification Tournament.
- January 5 – 10: 2016 European Men's Continental Olympic Qualification in (Germany) Berlin
  - Russia has qualified to compete at Rio 2016.
  - France and Poland has qualified to compete at FIVB World Qualification Tournament.
- January 6 – 10: 2016 CSV Women's South American Olympic Qualification in Bariloche
  - Argentina has qualified to compete at Rio 2016.
  - Peru has qualified to compete at FIVB World Qualification Tournament.
  - Colombia has qualified to compete at FIVB Intercontinental Qualification Tournament.
- January 7 – 9: 2016 NORCECA Women's Continental Olympic Qualification at Pinnacle Bank Arena in Lincoln, Nebraska
  - The United States has qualified to compete at Rio 2016.
  - Dominican Republic has qualified to compete at FIVB World Qualification Tournament.
  - Puerto Rico has qualified to compete at FIVB Intercontinental Qualification Tournament.
- January 7 – 14: 2016 African Men's Continental Olympic Qualification in (Republic of the Congo) Brazzaville
  - Egypt has qualified to compete at Rio 2016.
  - Algeria and Tunisia has qualified to compete at FIVB Intercontinental Qualification Tournament.
- January 8 – 10: 2016 NORCECA Men's Continental Olympic Qualification in Edmonton
  - Cuba has qualified to compete at Rio 2016.
  - Canada has qualified to compete at FIVB World Qualification Tournament.
  - Mexico has qualified to compete at FIVB Intercontinental Qualification Tournament.
- February 12 – 16: 2016 African Women's Continental Olympic Qualification in Yaoundé
  - Cameroon has qualified to compete at Rio 2016.
- March 23 – April 1: 2016 Men's African Club Championship in (Egypt) Cairo
  - (Egypt) El Geish defeated (Tunisia) Espérance, 3–1 in matches won, to win their first Men's African Club Championship title. (Egypt) Smouha took third place.
- April 22 – 30: 2016 Women's African Club Championship in (Tunisia) Tunis
  - (Egypt) Al Ahly SC defeated (Tunisia) Carthage, 3–2 in matches played, to win their second consecutive and seventh overall Women's African Club Championship title.
  - Kenya Pipeline took third place.
- May 14 – 22: Women's World Olympic Qualification Tournament #1 in Tokyo
  - Italy, the Netherlands, Japan, and South Korea all qualified to compete at Rio 2016.
- May 20 – 22: Women's World Olympic Qualification Tournament #2 in San Juan, Puerto Rico
  - Puerto Rico has qualified to compete at Rio 2016.
- May 19 – 27: 2016 Men's Pan-American Volleyball Cup in Mexico City
  - Cuba defeated Argentina, 3–2 in matches played, to win their second Men's Pan-American Volleyball Cup title. Canada took third place.
- May 28 – June 5: Men's World Olympic Qualification Tournament #1 in (Japan) Tokyo
  - Poland, Iran, France, and Canada all qualified to compete at Rio 2016.
- June 3 – 5: Men's World Olympic Qualification Tournament #2 in Mexico City
  - Mexico qualified to compete at Rio 2016.
- June 24 – 29: 2016 Boys' Youth NORCECA Volleyball Championship in Havana
  - Cuba defeated the United States, 3–2 in matches played, to win their fourth Boys' Youth NORCECA Volleyball Championship title.
  - Mexico took the bronze medal.
- July 2 – 6: 19th Southeast Asian Junior Men's Volleyball Championship 2016 in Naypyidaw
  - Round–robin group: 1. Thailand, 2. Myanmar–A, 3. Indonesia
- July 2 – 10: 2016 Women's Pan-American Volleyball Cup in Santo Domingo
  - The Dominican Republic defeated Puerto Rico, 3–2 in matches played, to win their fourth Women's Pan-American Volleyball Cup title.
  - The United States took the bronze medal.
- July 4 – 10: 2016 Men's Junior NORCECA Volleyball Championship in Gatineau
  - The United States defeated Cuba, 3–1 in matches played, to win their third Men's Junior NORCECA Volleyball Championship title.
  - Canada took the bronze medal.
- July 9 – 17: 2016 Asian Junior Men's Volleyball Championship in (Taiwan) Kaohsiung
  - The China defeated Iran, 3–2 in matches played, to win their 4th Asian Junior Men's Volleyball Championship.
  - South Korea took the bronze medal.
- July 16 – 20: 2016 Southeast Asian Women's U19 Volleyball Championship in Sisaket
  - Thailand defeated Vietnam, 3–1 in matches played, in the final. Indonesia took third place.
- July 23 – 31: 2016 Asian Junior Women's Volleyball Championship in Nakhon Ratchasima
  - China defeated Japan, 3–2 in matches played, in the final. Thailand took third place.
- July 26 – August 1: 2016 Women's Junior NORCECA Volleyball Championship in Fort Lauderdale, Florida
  - The Dominican Republic defeated the United States, 3–1 in matches played, to win their second Women's Junior NORCECA Volleyball Championship title.
  - Cuba took third place.
- August 23 – 31: 2016 Asian Men's Club Volleyball Championship in Myanmar
  - (Iran) Sarmayeh Bank Tehran VC defeated (Qatar) Al Arabi, 3–1 in matches played, to win their first Asian Men's Club Volleyball Championship title.
  - (Japan) Toyoda Gosei Trefuerza took third place.
- August 27 – September 4: 2016 Women's U19 Volleyball European Championship in Hungary and Slovakia
  - Russia defeated Serbia, 3–0 in matches played, to win their second Women's U19 Volleyball European Championship title.
  - Turkey took third place.
- September 2 – 10: 2016 Men's U20 Volleyball European Championship in Bulgaria
  - Poland defeated Ukraine, 3–1 in matches played, to win their second Men's U20 Volleyball European Championship title.
  - Russia took third place.
- September 3 – 11: 2016 Asian Women's Club Volleyball Championship in (Philippines) Biñan
  - (Japan) NEC Red Rockets defeated (China) Ba'yi Shenzhen, 3–0 in matches played, to win their first Asian Women's Club Volleyball Championship title.
  - (Thailand) Bangkok Glass took third place.
- September 14 – 20: 2016 Asian Women's Cup Volleyball Championship in (Vietnam) Vĩnh Phúc Province
  - China defeated Kazakhstan, 3–0 in matches played, to win their second consecutive and fourth overall Asian Women's Cup Volleyball Championship title.
  - Thailand took third place.
- September 22 – 28: 2016 Asian Men's Cup Volleyball Championship in (Thailand) Nakhon Pathom
  - Iran defeated China, 3–1 in matches played, to win their third AVC Cup for Men title.
  - Japan took third place.
- October 17 – 23: 2016 FIVB Volleyball Men's Club World Championship in (Brazil) Betim
  - (Brazil) Sada Cruzeiro defeated (Russia) Zenit Kazan, 3–0 in matches played, to win their second consecutive and third overall FIVB Volleyball Men's Club World Championship title.
  - (Italy) Trentino Diatec took third place.
- October 18 – 23: 2016 FIVB Volleyball Women's Club World Championship in (Philippines) Pasay
  - (Turkey) Eczacıbaşı VitrA defeated (Italy) Pomì Casalmaggiore, 3–2 in matches played, to win their second consecutive FIVB Volleyball Women's Club World Championship title.
  - (Turkey) Vakıfbank İstanbul took third place.

=== 2016 FIVB Volleyball World League ===
- July 1 – 3: Group 3 Finals in Frankfurt
  - Winners: Slovenia
  - Second: Germany
  - Third: Greece
- July 9 & 10: Group 2 Finals in Matosinhos
  - Winners: Canada
  - Second: Portugal
  - Third: The Netherlands
- July 13 – 17: Group 1 Finals in (Poland) Kraków
  - Winners: Serbia
  - Second: Brazil
  - Third: France

=== 2016 FIVB Volleyball World Grand Prix ===
- June 17 – 19: Group 3 Finals in Almaty
  - Winners: Croatia
  - Second: Kazakhstan
  - Third: Peru
- June 17 – 19: Group 2 Finals in (Bulgaria) Plovdiv
  - Winners: Dominican Republic
  - Second: Poland
  - Third: Puerto Rico
- July 6 – 10: Group 1 Finals in (Thailand) Bangkok
  - Winners: Brazil
  - Second: The United States
  - Third: The Netherlands

== Volleyball Hall of Fame ==
- Class of 2016:
  - Emanuel Rego
  - Nikola Grbić
  - Misty May-Treanor
  - Danielle Scott-Arruda
  - Park Man-bok
