= Swatch FIVB World Tour 2012 =

Tournament details
- Host country: Various
- Dates: April – October, 2012

The Swatch FIVB World Tour 2012 is an international beach volleyball competition.

The 2012 tour consists of 9 tournaments with both genders and 5 separate gender tournaments.

== Grand Slam ==
There are six Grand Slam tournaments and one World Championships. These events give a higher number of points and more money than the rest of the tournaments.

- Shanghai, China – Shanghai Grand Slam presented by Jinshan Xinchen, April 30–May 6, 2012
- Beijing, China – Beijing Grand Slam, 7–13 May 2012
- Moscow, Russia – Moscow Grand Slam, 6–12 June 2012
- Rome, Italy – Rome Grand Slam, 12–17 June 2012
- Gstaad, Switzerland – 1 to 1 Energy Grand Slam, 2–8 July 2012
- Berlin, Germany – Smart Grand Slam Berlin 2012, 10–15 July 2012
- Klagenfurt, Austria – A1 presented by Volksbank, 16–22 July 2012
- Stare Jabłonki, Poland – Mazury Orlen Grand Slam, 13–19 August 2012

== Tournament results ==
=== Women ===
Event	Gold	Silver	Bronze
Brasilia Open	(China) Xue–Zhang Xi	(Brazil) Talita–Antonelli	(Italy) Cicolari–Menegatti
Sanya Open	(Brazil) Talita–Antonelli	(Brazil) Larissa–Juliana	(China) Xue–Zhang Xi
Shanghai Grand Slam	(China) Xue–Zhang Xi	(Brazil) Talita–Antonelli	(Brazil) Larissa–Juliana
Beijing Grand Slam	(Brazil) Larissa–Juliana	(Italy) Cicolari–Menegatti	(Netherlands) Keizer–Van Iersel
Moscow Grand Slam	(China) Xue–Zhang Xi	(United States) Walsh–May-Treanor	(Brazil) Larissa–Juliana
Rome Grand Slam	(Switzerland) Kuhn–Zumkehr	(Germany) Goller–Ludwig	(United States) Kessy–Ross
1 to 1 Energy Grand Slam	(United States) May-Treanor–Walsh	(Netherlands) Keizer–Van Iersel	(Switzerland) Kuhn–Zumkehr
Smart Grand Slam Berlin	(Brazil) Larissa–Juliana	(China) Xue–Zhang Xi	(Italy) Cicolari–Menegatti
A1 Grand Slam	(Russia) Khomyakova–Ukolova	(Netherlands) Meppelink–Van Gestel	(Brazil) Talita–Antonelli
Mazury Orlen Grand Slam	(Brazil) Larissa–Juliana	(Italy) Cicolari–Menegatti	(Germany) Holtwick–Semmler
Paf Open	(Germany) Holtwick–Semmler	(Spain) Liliana–Baquerizo	(Russia) Khomyakova–Ukolova
Bangsaen Thailand Open	(United States) Kessy–Ross	(Russia) Ukolova–Khomyakova	(Brazil) Agatha–Seixas

=== Men ===
Event	Gold	Silver	Bronze
Brasilia Open	(United States) Rogers–Dalhausser	(United States) Fuerbringer–Lucena	(Brazil) Cunha–Ricardo
Silesia Open	(Brazil) Cunha–Ricardo	(Brazil) Márcio Araújo–Pedro	(Spain) Herrera–Gavira
Shanghai Grand Slam	(United States) Rogers–Dalhausser	(United States) Gibb–Rosenthal	(Brazil) Márcio Araújo–Pedro
Beijing Grand Slam	(Netherlands) Nummerdor–Schuil	(Italy) Nicolai–Lupo	(Brazil) Alison–Emanuel
Patria Direct Prague Open	(Brazil) Ricardo–Cunha	(Brazil) Alison–Emanuel	(United States) Rogers–Dalhausser
Moscow Grand Slam	(Brazil) Alison–Emanuel	(Netherlands) Nummerdor–Schuil	(Brazil) Cunha–Ricardo
Rome Grand Slam	(United States) Gibb–Rosenthal	(Brazil) Alison–Emanuel	(Switzerland) Heyer–Chevallier
1 to 1 Energy Grand Slam	(United States) Gibb–Rosenthal	(Brazil) Alison–Emanuel	(Italy) Nicolai–Lupo
Smart Grand Slam Berlin	(Brazil) Alison–Emanuel	(United States) Gibb–Rosenthal	(Poland) Fijalek–Prudel
A1 Grand Slam	(Netherlands) Nummerdor–Schuil	(Brazil) Márcio Araújo–Pedro	(United States) Gibb–Rosenthal
Mazury Orlen Grand Slam	(Latvia) Pļaviņš–Šmēdiņš	(Austria) Doppler–Horst	(United States) Rogers–Dalhausser

== Medal table by country ==
Rank	Nation	Gold	Silver	Bronze	Total
1	Brazil (BRA)	8	8	8	24
2	United States (USA)	6	4	4	14
3	China (CHN)	3	1	1	5
4	Netherlands (NED)	2	3	1	6
5	Germany (GER)	1	1	1	3
5	Russia (RUS)	1	1	1	3
7	Switzerland (SUI)	1	0	2	3
8	Latvia (LAT)	1	0	0	1
9	Italy (ITA)	0	3	3	6
10	Spain (ESP)	0	1	1	2
11	Austria (AUT)	0	1	0	1
12	Poland (POL)	0	0	1	1
Totals (12 entries)		23	23	23	69
