= Jake Gibb =

American beach volleyball player

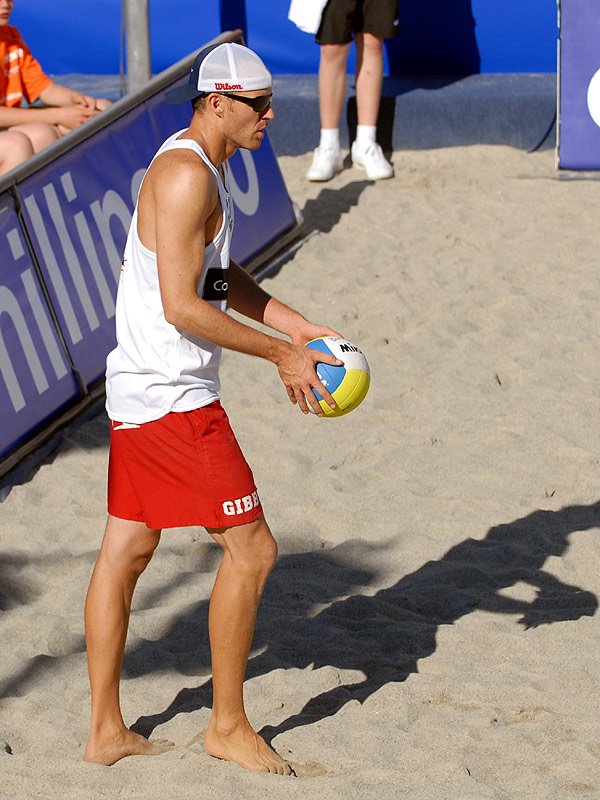
- Gibb in 2008

Personal information
- Full name: Jacob Spiker Gibb
- Nationality: United States
- Born: February 6, 1976 (age 50); Bountiful, Utah, U.S.
- Hometown: Bountiful, Utah, U.S.
- Height: 6 ft 7 in (201 cm)
Medal record
Men's beach volleyball
Representing the United States
World Tour
Gold medal – first place	2006 Mexico	Beach
Gold medal – first place	2008 Prague	Beach
Gold medal – first place	2012 Rome	Beach
Gold medal – first place	2012 Gstaad	Beach
Gold medal – first place	2013 Shanghai	Beach
Gold medal – first place	2015 St. Petersburg	Beach
Gold medal – first place	2020 Chetumal	Beach
Silver medal – second place	2005 Paris	Beach
Silver medal – second place	2006 Paris	Beach
Silver medal – second place	2006 Brazil	Beach
Silver medal – second place	2011 Shanghai	Beach
Silver medal – second place	2012 Shanghai	Beach
Silver medal – second place	2012 Berlin	Beach
Silver medal – second place	2013 Corrientes	Beach
Silver medal – second place	2015 Olsztyn	Beach
Bronze medal – third place	2005 Brazil	Beach
Bronze medal – third place	2005 South Africa	Beach
Bronze medal – third place	2009 Myslowice	Beach
Bronze medal – third place	2011 Québec	Beach
Bronze medal – third place	2012 Klagenfurt	Beach
Bronze medal – third place	2013 Gstaad	Beach
Bronze medal – third place	2014 Stare Jabłonki	Beach
Bronze medal – third place	2021 Doha	Beach

Jacob Spiker Gibb (born February 6, 1976) is an American professional beach volleyball player, who currently plays on the AVP Tour with Taylor Crabb as his partner. Gibb and Casey Patterson represented the United States at the 2016 Summer Olympics. Previously, Gibb and Sean Rosenthal played together from 2006 to 2012. The duo represented Team USA at the 2008 and 2012 Olympic Games.

== Personal life ==
Gibb was born and raised in Bountiful, Utah, where he played golf and basketball. His middle name is his mother's maiden name, Spiker. He did not play volleyball in college, but attended the University of Utah and graduated in 2002 with a degree in business. It was not until he turned 21 that he took up the sport of beach volleyball with his twin brother, Coleman. He has ten brothers and sisters.

Gibb is a two-time cancer survivor. He was diagnosed with testicular cancer in 2010 and also had a melanoma removed from his left shoulder in 2002.

He and his wife, Jane, were married in 2000 and moved to Southern California in 2002. They reside in Huntington Beach, California.

== Career ==
=== Partners ===
- 2000–2002: Mike Daniel
- 2003: Ty Loomis
- 2004: Adam Jewell
- 2005: Stein Metzger
- 2006–2013: Sean Rosenthal
- 2013–2016: Casey Patterson
- 2017–2021: Taylor Crabb

=== AVP ===
Before partnering up with Crabb in 2017, he previously played with Sean Rosenthal, Mike Daniel, Stein Metzger, Ty Loomis and Adam Jewell. In 2005 with Stein Metzger, the duo played in 14 AVP events and won four, which led the tour. They also finished second three times and third five times.

In 2006, Gibb and Rosenthal played in 16 AVP events and won one – the very first event they played together. In 2007, they played in 17 AVP events and won two. They also finished second seven times and third twice. In 2008, they beat top-ranked American duo Phil Dalhausser and Todd Rogers in the final AVP Tour event before the 2008 Beijing Olympics in Long Beach, California. Overall, they played seven AVP Tour events in 2008 and won two, and also placed second in two.

==== AVP honors ====
- 2005
  - AVP Most Valuable Player
  - AVP Team of the Year (with Metzger)
  - FIVB Top Rookie
- 2004
  - AVP Most Improved Player

=== Olympics ===
Gibb made his Olympic debut at the 2008 Summer Olympics with Rosenthal. The team made it to the quarterfinals before losing to Brazilian duo of Ricardo Santos and Emanuel Rego. Gibb and Rosenthal finished 5th again at the 2012 London Olympics when they lost to the Latvian team. Although it was a disappointing finish at the London Olympics, Gibb and Rosenthal finished 1st in the world on the FIVB tour. After a great year, Gibb and Rosenthal decided to conclude their partnership and play with other teammates. The next year, Gibb began to play with Casey Patterson.

Gibb participated with Tri Bourne after Taylor Crabb withdrew due to COVID-19 at the 2020 Summer Olympics in 2021, at age 45, making him the oldest ever Olympic Beach Volleyball competitor and finished 9th.

Sporting positions
Preceded by Alison Cerutti and Emanuel Rego (BRA)	Men's FIVB Beach Volley World Tour Winner alongside (United States) Sean Rosenthal; 2012	Succeeded by Jānis Šmēdiņš and Aleksandrs Samoilovs (LAT)
Awards
Preceded by Emanuel Rego (BRA)	Men's FIVB World Tour "Most Inspirational"; 2013–2014	Succeeded by Emanuel Rego (BRA)
Preceded by Inaugural	Men's FIVB World Tour "Top Rookie" with Matteo Varnier (ITA); 2005	Succeeded by Sean Rosenthal (USA)
Preceded by Alison Cerutti and Emanuel Rego (BRA)	Men's FIVB World Tour "Team of the Year" alongside (United States) Sean Rosenthal; 2012	Succeeded by Jānis Šmēdiņš and Aleksandrs Samoilovs (LAT)
