= Sean Rosenthal =

American beach volleyball player

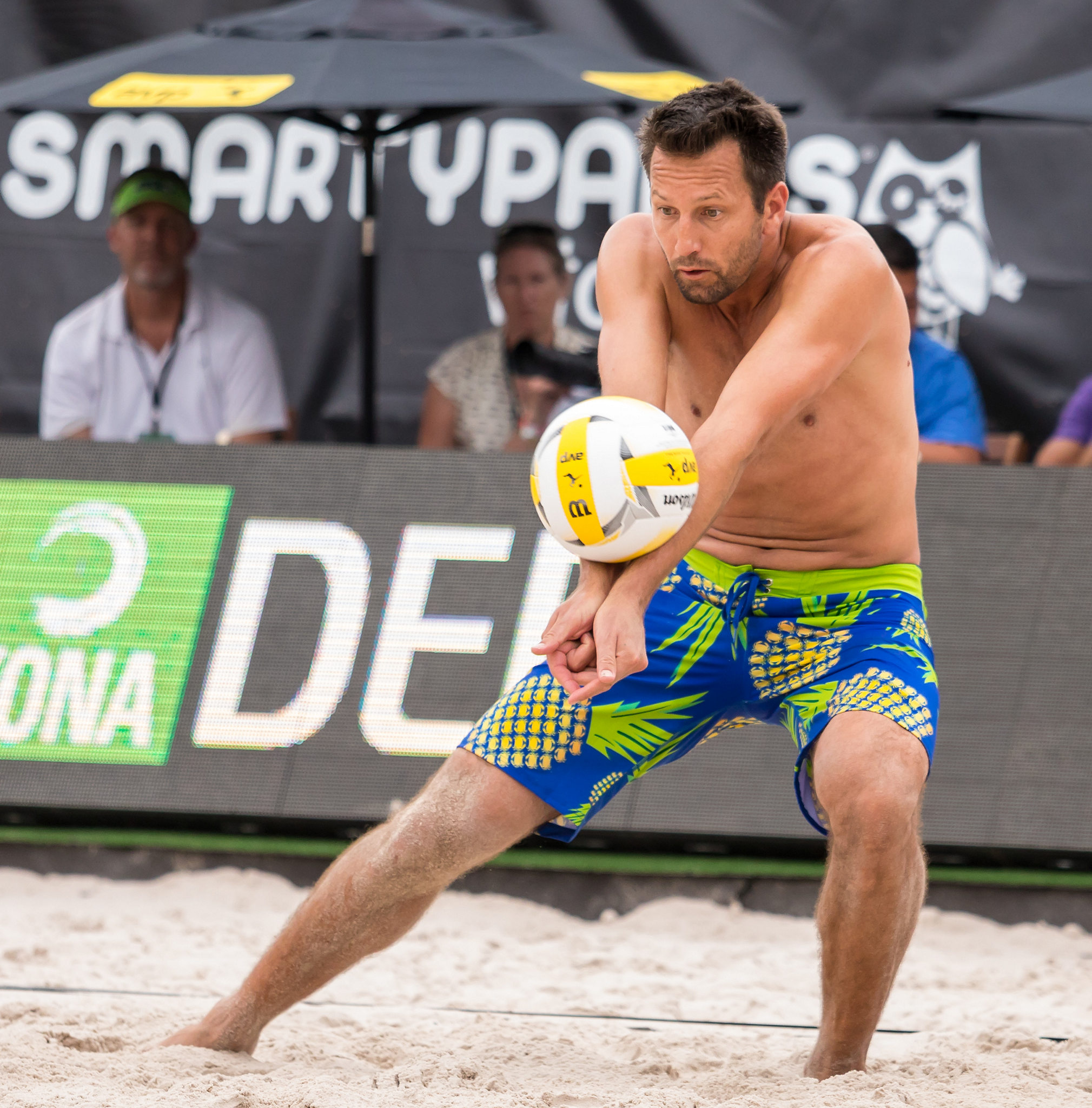
- Sean Rosenthal at the 2017 AVP Austin Open

Personal information
- Full name: Sean Michael Rosenthal
- Nickname: Superman
- Nationality: United States
- Born: June 19, 1980 (age 46); Torrance, California, U.S.
- Hometown: Redondo Beach, California, U.S.
- Height: 6 ft 3 in (1.91 m)
Medal record
Men's beach volleyball
Representing the United States
World Tour
Gold medal – first place	2006 Mexico	Beach
Gold medal – first place	2008 Prague	Beach
Gold medal – first place	2012 Rome	Beach
Gold medal – first place	2012 Gstaad	Beach
Gold medal – first place	2013 Rome	Beach
Gold medal – first place	2013 Long Beach	Beach
Gold medal – first place	2014 Stavanger	Beach
Gold medal – first place	2014 Gstaad	Beach
Gold medal – first place	2014 Long Beach	Beach
Silver medal – second place	2006 Paris	Beach
Silver medal – second place	2006 Brazil	Beach
Silver medal – second place	2011 Shanghai	Beach
Silver medal – second place	2012 Shanghai	Beach
Silver medal – second place	2012 Berlin	Beach
Silver medal – second place	2014 The Hague	Beach
Bronze medal – third place	2009 Myslowice	Beach
Bronze medal – third place	2011 Québec	Beach
Bronze medal – third place	2012 Klagenfurt	Beach
Bronze medal – third place	2014 Moscow	Beach

Sean Michael Rosenthal (born June 19, 1980) is an American beach volleyball player, playing as a defender. He is best known for his high leaping ability, which has earned him the nickname of "Superman". Rosenthal has an entourage called "Rosie's Raiders", which is composed of close friends of his who enjoy going to his various tournaments to support him. He and his former partner, Jake Gibb, represented the United States at the 2008 Olympic Games and 2012 Olympic Games in beach volleyball.

== Personal life ==
Sean Rosenthal was born in Torrance, California. He was raised by his mother, Laura Hurlburt. He attended Redondo Union High School. Rosenthal was married to Kayce Matthess and has three children with her.

== Professional career ==
At the age of 16, he made his professional debut in the AVP. Sean's partner in his first season was Dale Smith. He has gone on to pair up with players like Jake Gibb and Phil Dalhausser. Some of his professional accomplishments include 11 tour victories in the AVP, Best Server in the AVP in 2002, Best Defensive Player in the AVP in 2007, and participation in the 2008 and 2012 Olympics.

== International Competitions ==
Sean and partner Jake Gibb competed in eight FIVB events in 2008 as part of the Olympic qualifying process and earned $42,650 on the FIVB tour in 2008. In 2007, Rosenthal and Gibb played in six international events, with fifth being their best finish. They won $26,950.

=== Olympics ===
Rosenthal made his Olympic debut at the 2008 Summer Olympics with Gibb. The team made it to the quarterfinals before losing to the Brazilian duo Ricardo Santos and Emanuel Rego. At the 2012 Summer Olympics, Rosenthal and Gibb again made it to the quarter-finals where they lost to Martins Plavins and Janis Smedins of Latvia. Shortly after the 2012 Summer Olympics, Gibb and Rosenthal split up as teammates after six years as partners.

== Previous partners ==
- 2018 – Chase Budinger
- 2013-15 - Phil Dalhausser, Theo Brunner
- 2006-12 - Jake Gibb
- 2003-05 - Larry Witt
- 2002 - Mark Williams
- 2001 - Casey Jennings, Jeff Carlucci, Mark Williams
- 2000 - Jeff Carlucci
- 1997 - Dale Smith

== Awards ==
- 2012 - FIVB Most Outstanding Player
- 2012 - FIVB Team Of The Year (Jake Gibb)
- 2012 - FIVB Tour Champion (Jake Gibb)
- 2007 - AVP Best Defensive Player
- 2006 - FIVB Top Rookie
- 2002 - AVP Best Server

Sporting positions
Preceded by Alison Cerutti and Emanuel Rego (BRA)	Men's FIVB Beach Volley World Tour Winner alongside (United States) Jake Gibb; 2012	Succeeded by Jānis Šmēdiņš and Aleksandrs Samoilovs (LAT)
Awards
Preceded by Matteo Varnier (ITA); Jake Gibb (USA)	Men's FIVB World Tour "Top Rookie"; 2006	Succeeded by Igor Kolodinsky (RUS)
Preceded by Emanuel Rego (BRA)	Men's FIVB World Tour "Most Outstanding"; 2012	Succeeded by Phil Dalhausser (USA)
Preceded by Alison Cerutti and Emanuel Rego (BRA)	Men's FIVB World Tour "Team of the Year" alongside (United States) Jake Gibb; 2012	Succeeded by Jānis Šmēdiņš and Aleksandrs Samoilovs (LAT)
