= Katrin Holtwick =

German beach volleyball player

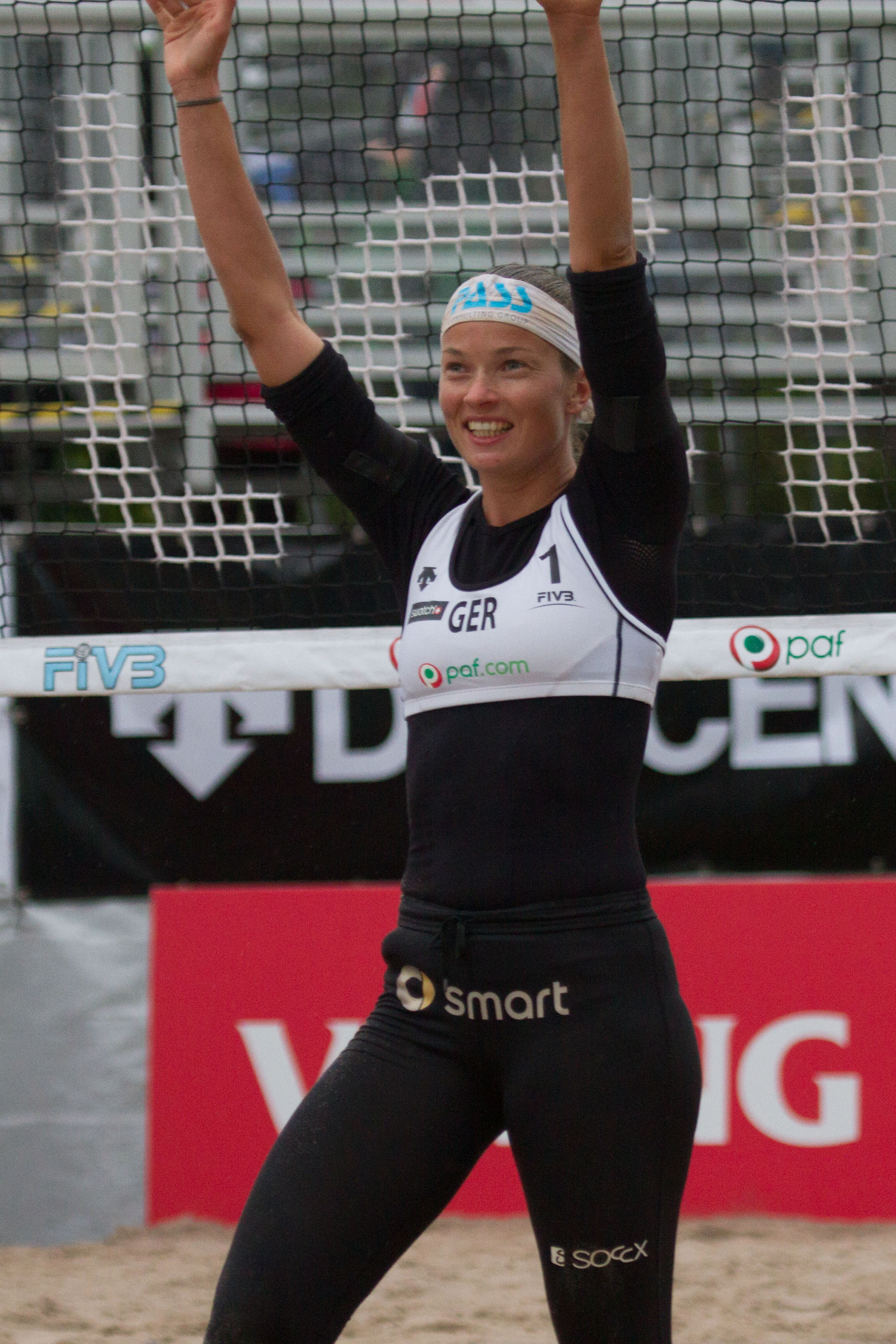

Personal information
- Born: 10 April 1984 (age 42); Bocholt, West Germany
- Hometown: Berlin, Germany
- Height: 176 cm (5 ft 9 in)

Beach volleyball information
Years	Teammate
2003–04; 2005; 2005; 2006–16	Maria Kleefisch; Friederike Fischer; Sara Goller; Ilka Semmler
Honours
World Tour
Gold medal – first place	2014 Gstaad	Beach
Gold medal – first place	2012 Aland	Beach
Silver medal – second place	2014 The Hague	Beach
Silver medal – second place	2014 Prague	Beach
Silver medal – second place	2013 Berlin	Beach
Silver medal – second place	2012 Beijing	Beach
Silver medal – second place	2008 Myslowice	Beach
Bronze medal – third place	2014 Stare Jablonski	Beach
Bronze medal – third place	2013 Long Beach	Beach
Bronze medal – third place	2013 The Hague	Beach
Bronze medal – third place	2013 Fuzhou	Beach
Bronze medal – third place	2012 Stare Jablonski	Beach
Bronze medal – third place	2008 Klagenfurt	Beach

Katrin Holtwick (born 10 April 1984) is a German retired beach volleyball player. From 2006 to 2016, she played with Ilka Semmler. They competed at the 2012 Summer Olympics in London.

She won 2 gold medals, 5 silver medals and 6 bronze medals in the FIVB Beach Volleyball World Tour.

== Professional career ==
=== 2016 World Tour ===
At the 2016 Grand Slam in Long Beach, California (Germany vs Germany) the pair finished 4th after a loss to their compatriots Chantal Laboureur/Julia Sude in straight sets (21-16, 21-17).

In September 2016 Holtwick retired after two losses in the German Beach Volleyball Championship.
