= Christiaan Varenhorst =

Dutch beach volleyball player (born 1990)

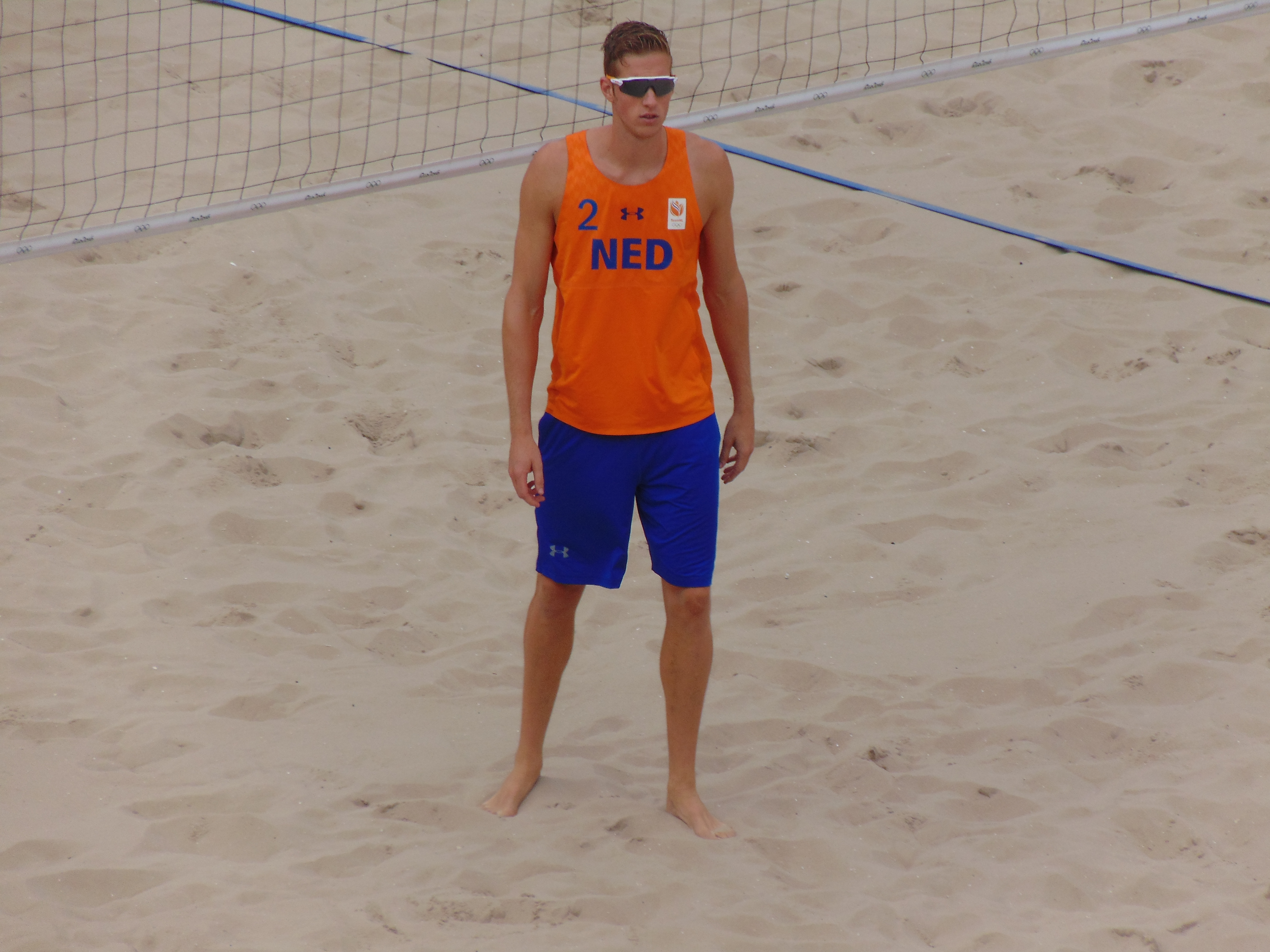
- Varenhorst at the 2016 Summer Olympics

Personal information
- Nationality: Dutch
- Born: 6 May 1990 (age 36)
- Height: 6 ft 11 in (211 cm)

Beach volleyball information

Current teammate
Teammate
Reinder Nummerdor

Christiaan Varenhorst (born 6 May 1990) is a Dutch beach volleyball player.

Varenhorst competed at the 2016 Summer Olympics in Rio de Janeiro in the men's beach volleyball tournament with partner Reinder Nummerdor. Varenhorst specializes as a blocker.

Awards
Preceded by Jānis Šmēdiņš (LAT)	Men's FIVB World Tour "Best Hitter"; 2015	Succeeded by Alison Cerutti (BRA)
