= Julia Sude =

German volleyball player (born 1987)

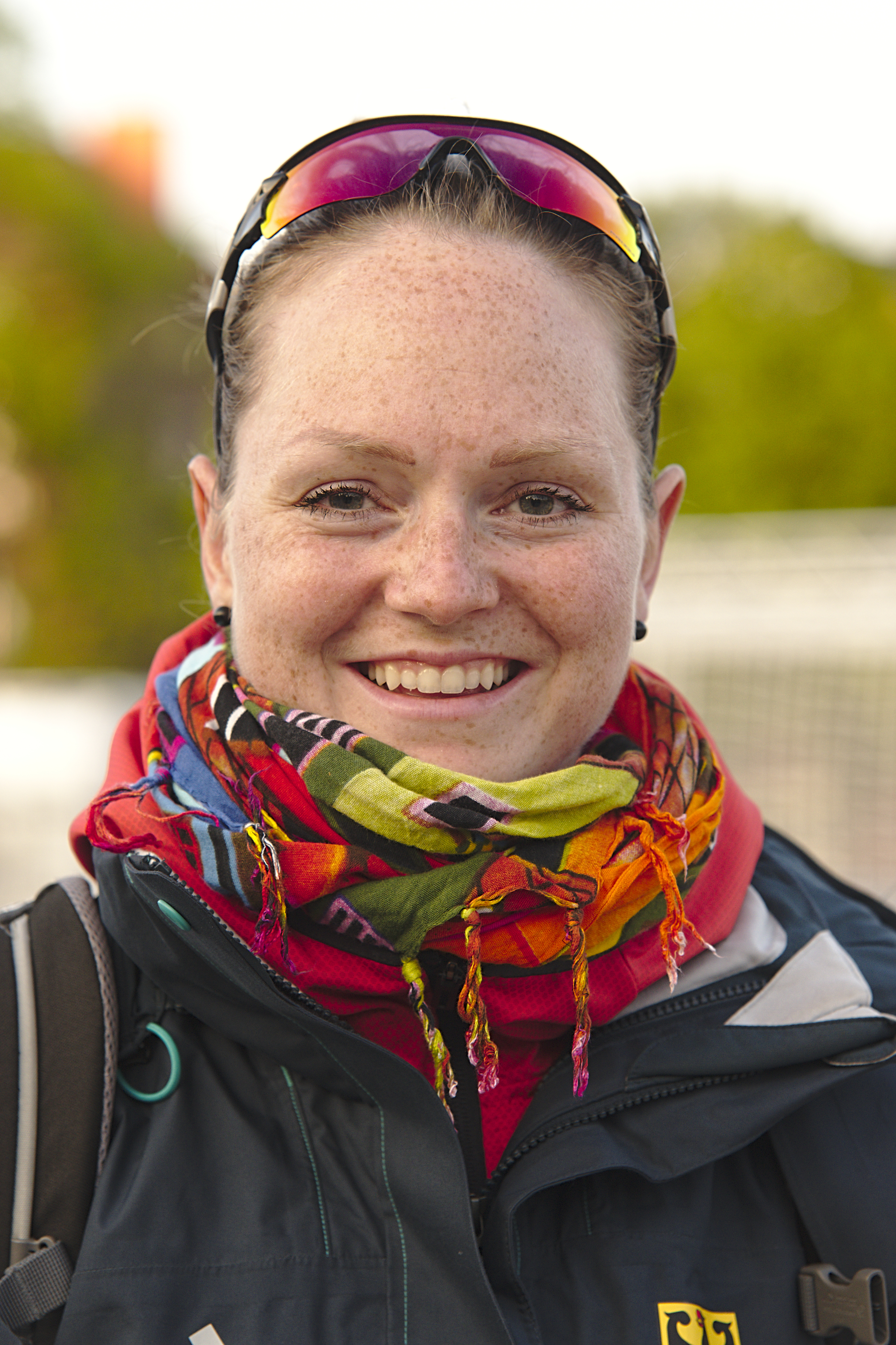
- Sude in 2017

Personal information
- Nationality: German
- Born: September 2, 1987 (age 39); Giessen, West Germany
- Hometown: Friedrichshafen
- Height: 185 cm (6 ft 1 in)
- Weight: 77 kg (170 lb)

Beach volleyball information

Current teammate
Years	Teammate
2019–present	Karla Borger

Previous teammates
Years	Teammate
2015–2018	Chantal Laboureur

National team
Germany
Honours
European Championships
Bronze medal – third place	2017 Jūrmala	Beach
Bronze medal – third place	2021 Vienna	Beach

Julia Sude (born 2 September 1987) is a German beach volleyball player.

== Professional career ==
Since 2015 her teammate has been Chantal Laboureur.

== World tour 2016 ==
At the 2016 Grand Slam at Long Beach, California, In semi final action (Aug 27, 2016) Julia Sude and Laboureur lost to Kerri Walsh Jennings and April Ross of United States straight sets (21 - 17, 21 - 16).

Bronze medal match (Germany vs Germany) the pair won in straight sets (21-16, 21-17) against Katrin Holtwick and Ilka Semmler.

The pair competed at the Toronto World Tour finals in Sept. 2016 placing 1st in Pool D and advance to Quarter Finals.
