= Chantal Laboureur =

German beach volleyball player (born 1990)

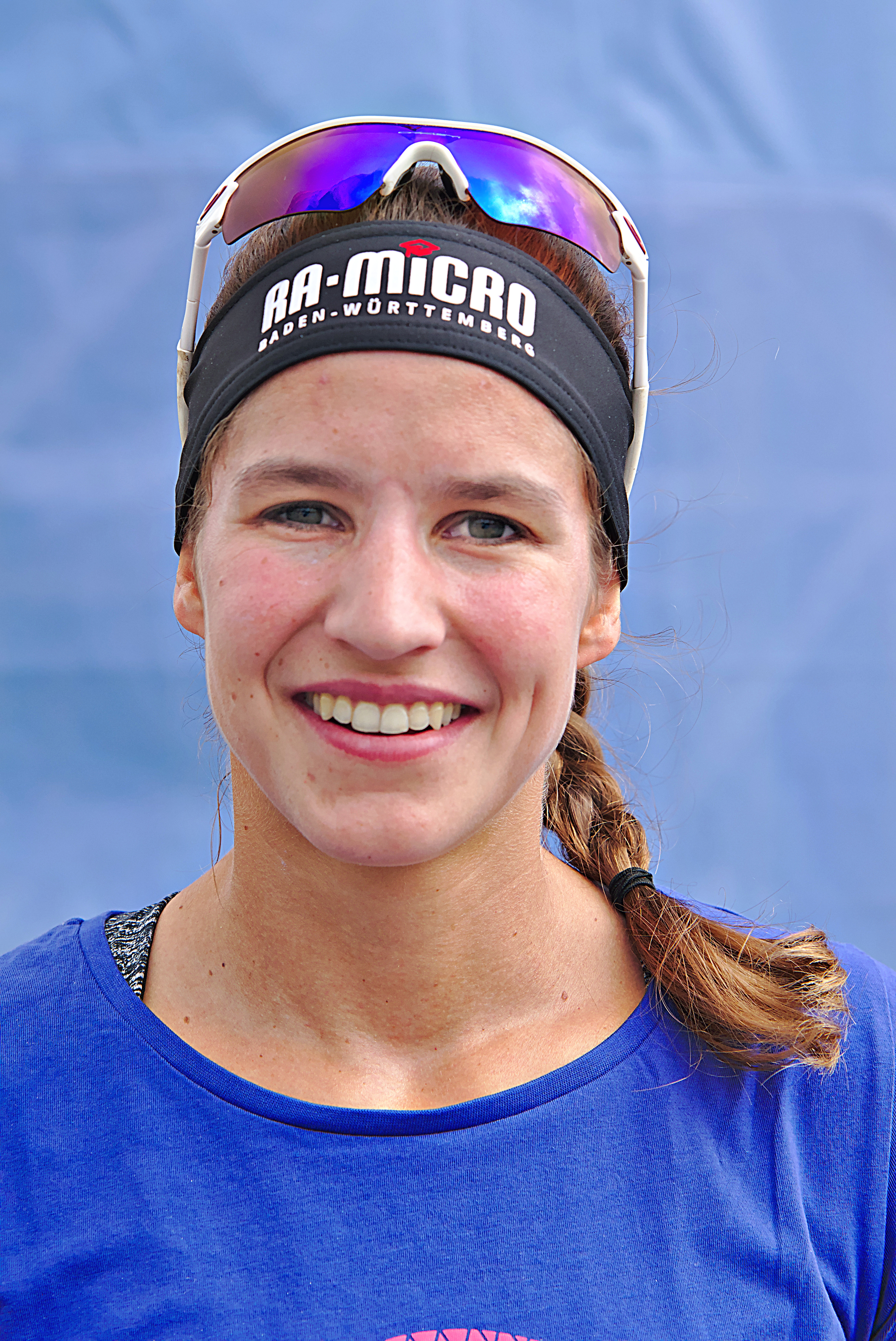
- Laboureur in 2018

Personal information
- Nationality: German
- Born: January 4, 1990 (age 36); Friedrichshafen, West Germany
- Hometown: Stuttgart
- Height: 179 cm (5 ft 10 in)
- Weight: 70 kg (154 lb)

Beach volleyball information
Years	Teammate
2007–2008; 2008–2012; 2009; 2010; 2011–2012; 2012; 2013–2018; 2014; 2019–2020; 2021; 2021–2022	Levke Spinger; Kira Walkenhorst; Katharina Schillerwein; Claudia Lehmann; Christine Aulenbrock; Anni Schumacher; Julia Sude; Elena Kiesling; Sandra Ittlinger; Cinja Tillmann; Sarah Schulz

National team
Germany

Chantal Laboureur (born 4 January 1990) is a retired German beach volleyball player.

== Professional career ==
From 2021 to 2022 her teammate has been Sarah Schulz. She has ended her career in late 2022.

== World tour 2016 ==
At the 2016 Grand Slam at Long Beach, California, In semi final action (Aug 27, 2016) Laboureur and Julia Sude lost to Kerri Walsh Jennings and April Ross of United States straight sets (21 - 17, 21 - 16).

Bronze medal match (Germany vs Germany) the pair won in straight sets (21-16, 21–17) against Katrin Holtwick and Ilka Semmler.

The pair competed at the Toronto World Tour finals in Sept. 2016 placing 1st in Pool D and advance to Quarter Finals.

== Personal life ==
Laboureur is of distant French descent on her father's side.
