= Aleksandrs Samoilovs =

Latvian beach volleyball player

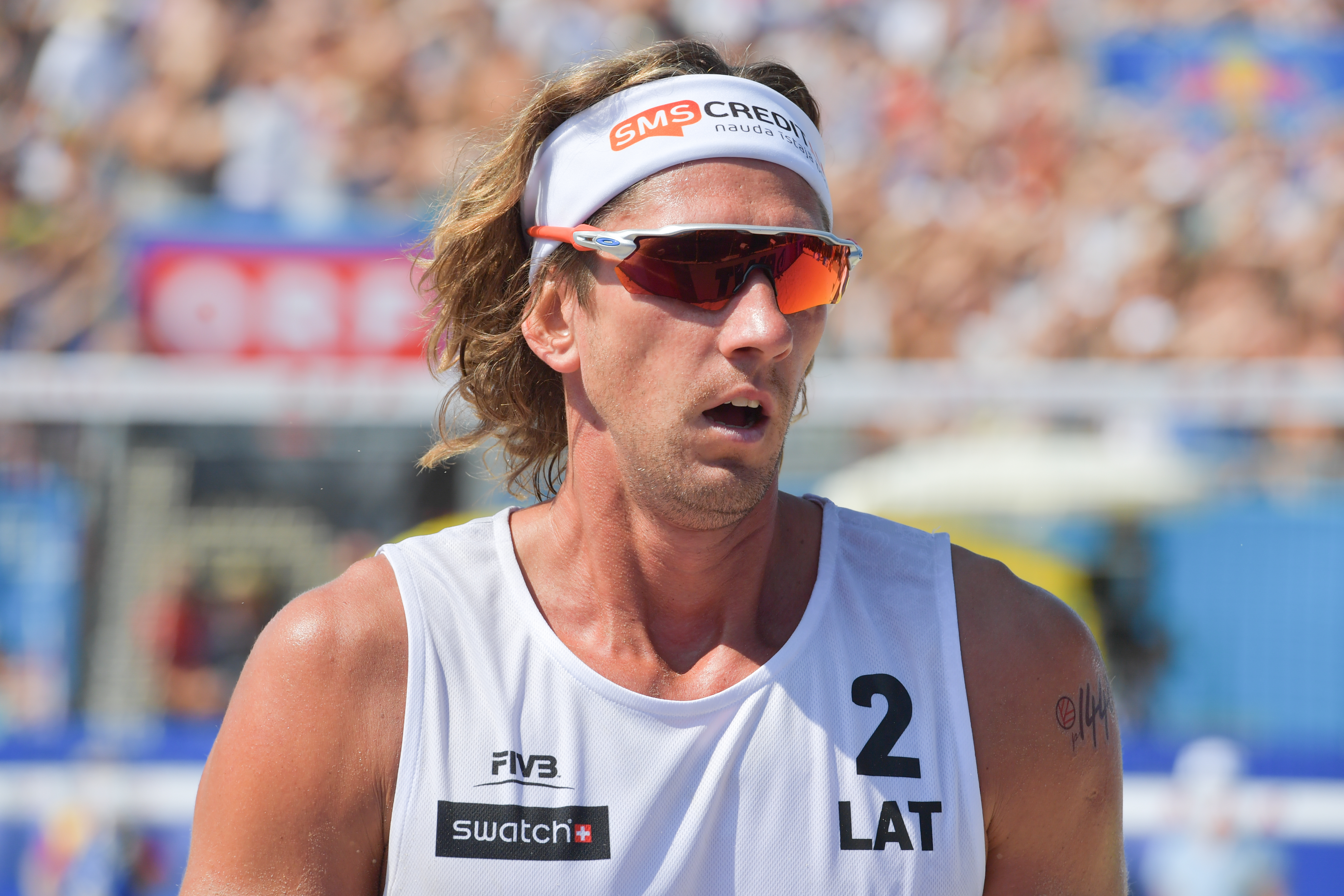

Personal information
- Nickname: The Lion King
- Nationality: Latvian
- Born: 6 April 1985 (age 41); Riga, Latvia
- Hometown: Riga, Latvia
- Height: 195 cm (6 ft 5 in)
- Weight: 94 kg (207 lb)

Beach volleyball information

Current teammate
Years	Teammate
2004, 2008–present	Jānis Šmēdiņš

Previous teammates
Teammate
Ruslans Sorokins, Mārtiņš Pļaviņš
Honours
Men's beach volleyball
Representing Latvia
European Championships
Gold medal – first place	2015 Klagenfurt	Beach
Silver medal – second place	2014 Cagliari	Beach
Silver medal – second place	2013 Klagenfurt	Beach

Aleksandrs Samoilovs (born 6 April 1985) is a Latvian beach volleyball player.

Samoilovs and teammate Mārtiņš Pļaviņš, with whom he partnered since 2004, represented Latvia at the 2008 Summer Olympics in Beijing, China. The duo defeated the number 2 seed, Phil Dalhausser and Todd Rogers, in their first-round game, in what announcers called "the biggest upset in Olympic beach volleyball history". The Latvian team won its preliminary round group and in round of 16 lost to Austrian team Florian Gosch and Alexander Horst.

After the Olympics, Samoilovs and Pļaviņš stopped playing together.

At the 2012 Summer Olympics, he teamed with Ruslans Sorokins, where he again finished in 9th, reaching the round of 16, where they lost to Jonas Reckermann and Julius Brink of Germany.

He now partnering with Jānis Šmēdiņš.

== Best achievements ==
- 1st place World Tour 2013 and 2014
- 1st place U-21 World championship
- 1st place U-23 European championship
- 1st place U-20 European championship
- two times Latvian champion
- 5th place World tour in Italy in 2007
- 5th place World tour in Spain in 2008
- 9th place Olympic Games 2008
- 9th place Olympic Games 2012
- 1st place European championship 2015

Sporting positions
Preceded by Jake Gibb and Sean Rosenthal (USA)	Men's FIVB Beach Volley World Tour Winner alongside (Latvia) Jānis Šmēdiņš; 2013–2014	Succeeded by Alison Cerutti and Bruno Oscar Schmidt (BRA)
Preceded by Alison Cerutti and Bruno Oscar Schmidt (BRA)	Men's FIVB Beach Volley World Tour Winner alongside (Latvia) Jānis Šmēdiņš; 2016	Succeeded by Evandro Oliveira and André Stein (BRA)
Awards
Preceded by Jake Gibb and Sean Rosenthal (USA)	Men's FIVB World Tour "Team of the Year" alongside (Latvia) Jānis Šmēdiņš; 2013–2014	Succeeded by Alison Cerutti and Bruno Oscar Schmidt (BRA)
Preceded by Alison Cerutti and Bruno Oscar Schmidt (BRA)	Men's FIVB World Tour "Team of the Year" alongside (Latvia) Jānis Šmēdiņš; 2016	Succeeded by Evandro Oliveira and André Stein (BRA)
