= Phil Dalhausser =

American beach volleyball player

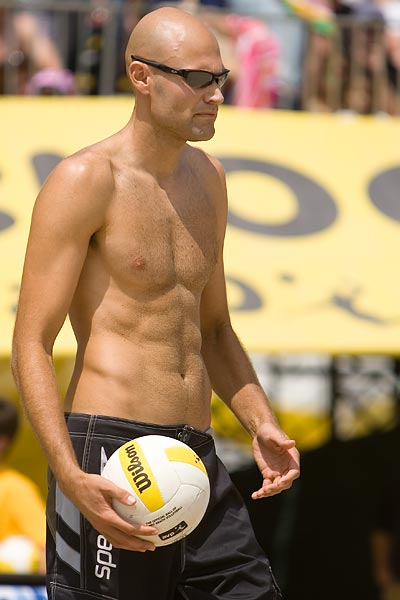
- Dalhausser in 2007

Personal information
- Full name: Philip "Phil" Peter Dalhausser
- Nickname: The Thin Beast, The Beijing Beast, The Beachfront Freak
- Nationality: American
- Born: January 26, 1980 (age 46); Baden, Aargau, Switzerland
- Hometown: Ventura, California, U.S.
- Height: 6 ft 9 in (206 cm)
- Education: UCF
Medal record
Men's beach volleyball
Representing the United States
Olympic Games
Gold medal – first place	2008 Beijing	Beach
World Championships
Gold medal – first place	2007 Gstaad	Beach
Bronze medal – third place	2009 Stavanger	Beach
World Tour Finals
Gold medal – first place	2017 Hamburg	Beach
Silver medal – second place	2015 Fort Lauderdale	Beach
World Tour
Gold medal – first place	2006 Austria	Beach
Gold medal – first place	2008 Paris	Beach
Gold medal – first place	2008 Stavanger	Beach
Gold medal – first place	2008 Moscow	Beach
Gold medal – first place	2009 Marseille	Beach
Gold medal – first place	2009 Klagenfurt	Beach
Gold medal – first place	2010 Brasília	Beach
Gold medal – first place	2010 Rome	Beach
Gold medal – first place	2010 Myslowice	Beach
Gold medal – first place	2010 Patria	Beach
Gold medal – first place	2010 Gstaad	Beach
Gold medal – first place	2010 Klagenfurt	Beach
Gold medal – first place	2010 Stare Jabłonki	Beach
Gold medal – first place	2010 Otera	Beach
Gold medal – first place	2010 PAF	Beach
Gold medal – first place	2011 Brasília	Beach
Gold medal – first place	2011 Shanghai	Beach
Gold medal – first place	2011 Québec	Beach
Gold medal – first place	2011 Stare Jabłonki	Beach
Gold medal – first place	2012 Brasilia	Beach
Gold medal – first place	2012 Shanghai	Beach
Gold medal – first place	2013 Rome	Beach
Gold medal – first place	2013 Long Beach	Beach
Gold medal – first place	2014 Stavanger	Beach
Gold medal – first place	2014 Gstaad	Beach
Gold medal – first place	2014 Long Beach	Beach
Gold medal – first place	2015 Xiamen	Beach
Gold medal – first place	2016 Puerto Vallarta	Beach
Gold medal – first place	2016 Maceió	Beach
Gold medal – first place	2016 Fuzhou	Beach
Gold medal – first place	2016 Hamburg	Beach
Gold medal – first place	2017 Moscow	Beach
Gold medal – first place	2017 Gstaad	Beach
Gold medal – first place	2018 Fort Lauderdale	Beach
Silver medal – second place	2006 Croatia	Beach
Silver medal – second place	2007 Brazil	Beach
Silver medal – second place	2008 Berlin	Beach
Silver medal – second place	2010 Moscow	Beach
Silver medal – second place	2011 Prague	Beach
Silver medal – second place	2011 Gstaad	Beach
Silver medal – second place	2011 PAF	Beach
Silver medal – second place	2013 São Paulo	Beach
Silver medal – second place	2014 The Hague	Beach
Silver medal – second place	2015 Long Beach	Beach
Silver medal – second place	2015 Sochi	Beach
Silver medal – second place	2016 Doha	Beach
Silver medal – second place	2016 Gstaad	Beach
Silver medal – second place	2016 Long Beach	Beach
Silver medal – second place	2019 Doha	Beach
Bronze medal – third place	2006 Mexico	Beach
Bronze medal – third place	2007 Berlin	Beach
Bronze medal – third place	2008 Adelaide	Beach
Bronze medal – third place	2008 Italian	Beach
Bronze medal – third place	2010 Stavanger	Beach
Bronze medal – third place	2011 Moscow	Beach
Bronze medal – third place	2011 Klagenfurt	Beach
Bronze medal – third place	2012 Prague	Beach
Bronze medal – third place	2012 Stare Jabłonki	Beach
Bronze medal – third place	2014 Moscow	Beach
Bronze medal – third place	2016 Cincinnati	Beach
Bronze medal – third place	2017 Fort Lauderdale	Beach
Bronze medal – third place	2021 Cancún	Beach

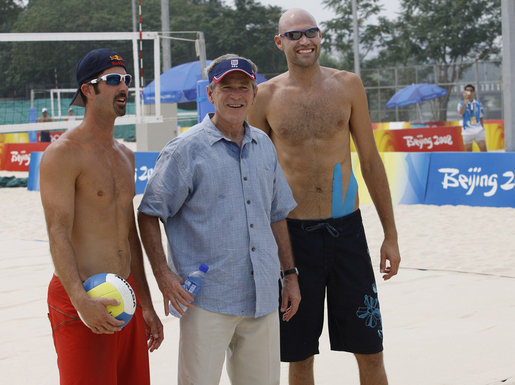
President George W. Bush poses with Dalhausser and teammate Todd Rogers as he visited the practice session Saturday, August 9, 2008, at Beijing's Chaoyang Park prior to their first matches at the 2008 Summer Olympics.

Philip Peter Dalhausser (born January 26, 1980) is an American professional beach volleyball player, who plays as a blocker. He and his former playing partner, Todd Rogers, were the 2007 AVP Tour and FIVB world champions.

Dalhausser and Rogers dominated both the domestic US tour and now the FIVB international tour, winning #1 team honors on both tours in 2010. Dalhausser and Rogers were Olympic gold medalists at the Beijing 2008 Summer Olympics. He announced he would retire from domestic play at the end of the 2025 season, but subsequently stated he would return to the sand. In 2023, Dalhausser was inducted into the International Volleyball Hall of Fame.

== Personal life ==
Dalhausser was born in Baden, Aargau, Switzerland, to a German father, Peter, and a Swiss mother, Marianne. He now calls his hometown Lake Nona, Florida. He attended Mainland High School in Daytona Beach, Florida. Dalhausser did not start playing volleyball until his senior year in high school.

He attended the University of Central Florida and joined Lambda Chi Alpha, where he was named "Most Valuable Player" and received the William G. Morgan Award for most outstanding player. He earned a business degree at UCF and played for the club volleyball team. After college, he worked for a concrete company and then worked a short time for a firm that painted stripes on Florida highways.

In 2011, Dalhausser married Jennifer Corral, who was also a professional beach volleyball player. The couple have two children.

== Volleyball career ==
=== AVP and FIVB ===
Dalhausser has previously teamed up with Nick Lucena.

At 6 ft 9 in (206 cm), Dalhausser led the 2005–2010 AVP tour in blocks. In 2005, he was sixth in kill percentage.

In 2006, Dalhausser teamed up with Todd Rogers. Rogers, an 11-year veteran of professional beach volleyball, thought he needed someone to help him get to the next level and believed Dalhausser had the potential to become the best player in the world. Rogers plays two roles, both partner and coach to Dalhausser.

In 2007, Dalhausser and Rogers won the Beach Volleyball World Championships in Gstaad, Switzerland, becoming the first U.S. beach team to win the gold medal at the tournament.

He announced that 2025 will be his final season, but just prior to winning the AVP league championship (alongside Trevor Crabb), Phil's wife posted that he will play again in the 2026 season.

=== Olympics ===
Dalhausser qualified for the Beijing 2008 Summer Olympics to represent the United States with his teammate Todd Rogers by being the top seeded American team through the international qualification process.

Dalhausser and Rogers had a record of 6–1 in their first Olympics, being upset in their opening match by 23rd-ranked Latvia. They proceeded to win the rest of their games, coming back from 6–0 in the third set to beat 20th-seeded Switzerland.

Dalhausser and Rogers won the gold medal match two sets to one against Márcio Araújo and Fabio Luiz Magalhães of Brazil. Newly crowned women's beach volleyball champions and compatriots Misty May-Treanor and Kerri Walsh were watching from the stands in the final. Dalhausser made nine blocks in the championship match, with five coming in the deciding third set, putting the US up to a 9–1 lead and eventually winning it 15–4. Dalhausser was named tournament MVP. This made the United States the only country to win gold medals in men's and women's beach volleyball at the same Olympics.

Dalhausser and Rogers failed to defend their gold medal at the London 2012 Summer Olympics. The pair was ousted in the round of 16 by the young Italian team of Paolo Nicolai and Daniele Lupo, losing in straight sets for the first time in their Olympic careers.

Dalhausser paired up with Nick Lucena for the Rio 2016 Summer Olympics, winning their debut match against Tunisia in straight sets.

At the Rio 2016 Summer Olympics, Phil Dalhausser and Nick Lucena made it into the quarterfinals match, where they played against Brazil's top-ranked team of 6-foot-8 Alison "The Mammoth" Cerutti and Bruno Oscar Schmidt. There they were eliminated by a 2–1 (21–14, 12–21, 15–9) scoreline, by the hometown's favorite team.

Dalhausser and Lucena made it again to the Tokyo 2020 Summer Olympics, where they finished 9th after a 1–2 against Cherif/Ahmed from Qatar. After the Olympic tournament, Dalhausser decided to retire from professional beach volleyball on the international circuit.

Positions and awards
Sporting positions
Preceded by Julius Brink and Jonas Reckermann (GER)	Men's FIVB Beach Volley World Tour Winner alongside (United States) Todd Rogers; 2010	Succeeded by Alison Cerutti and Emanuel Rego (BRA)
Awards
Preceded by Fábio Luiz Magalhães (BRA)	Men's FIVB World Tour "Best Blocker"; 2006–2008	Succeeded by Jonas Reckermann (GER)
Preceded by Jonas Reckermann (GER)	Men's FIVB World Tour "Best Blocker"; 2010	Succeeded by Alison Cerutti (BRA)
Preceded by Alison Cerutti (BRA)	Men's FIVB World Tour "Best Blocker"; 2012	Succeeded by Pedro Solberg Salgado (BRA)
Preceded by Pedro Solberg Salgado (BRA)	Men's FIVB World Tour "Best Blocker"; 2014	Succeeded by Alison Cerutti (BRA)
Preceded by Paolo Nicolai (ITA)	Men's FIVB World Tour "Best Blocker"; 2017	Succeeded by Anders Mol (NOR)
Preceded by Emanuel Rego (BRA)	Men's FIVB World Tour "Best Hitter"; 2007–2010	Succeeded by Alison Cerutti (BRA)
Preceded by Ricardo Santos (BRA)	Men's FIVB World Tour "Best Attacker"; 2008–2010	Succeeded by Alison Cerutti (BRA)
Preceded by Alison Cerutti (BRA)	Men's FIVB World Tour "Best Attacker"; 2012	Succeeded by Jānis Šmēdiņš (LAT)
Preceded by Jānis Šmēdiņš (LAT)	Men's FIVB World Tour "Best Attacker"; 2017	Succeeded by Anders Mol (NOR)
Preceded by Eric Koreng (GER)	Men's FIVB World Tour "Best Server"; 2014	Succeeded by Evandro Oliveira (BRA)
Preceded by Márcio Araújo (BRA)	Men's FIVB World Tour "Best Setter"; 2009–2012	Succeeded by Jānis Šmēdiņš (LAT)
Preceded by Jānis Šmēdiņš (LAT)	Men's FIVB World Tour "Best Setter"; 2014–2016	Succeeded by Bartosz Łosiak (POL)
Preceded by Fábio Luiz Magalhães (BRA)	Men's FIVB World Tour "Most Improved"; 2006	Succeeded by Dmitri Barsouk (RUS); Xu Linyin (CHN)
Preceded by Harley Marques (BRA); Richard Schuil (NED)	Men's FIVB World Tour "Most Outstanding"; 2010	Succeeded by Emanuel Rego (BRA)
Preceded by Sean Rosenthal (USA)	Men's FIVB World Tour "Most Outstanding"; 2013–2014	Succeeded by Bruno Oscar Schmidt (BRA)
Preceded by Bruno Oscar Schmidt (BRA)	Men's FIVB World Tour "Most Outstanding"; 2017	Succeeded by Anders Mol (NOR)
Preceded by Franco Neto (BRA)	Men's FIVB World Tour "Sportsperson"; 2008	Succeeded by Rivo Vesik (EST)
Preceded by Julius Brink and Jonas Reckermann (GER)	Men's FIVB World Tour "Team of the Year" alongside (United States) Todd Rogers; 2010	Succeeded by Alison Cerutti and Emanuel Rego (BRA)
