= Ilka Semmler =

German beach volleyball player

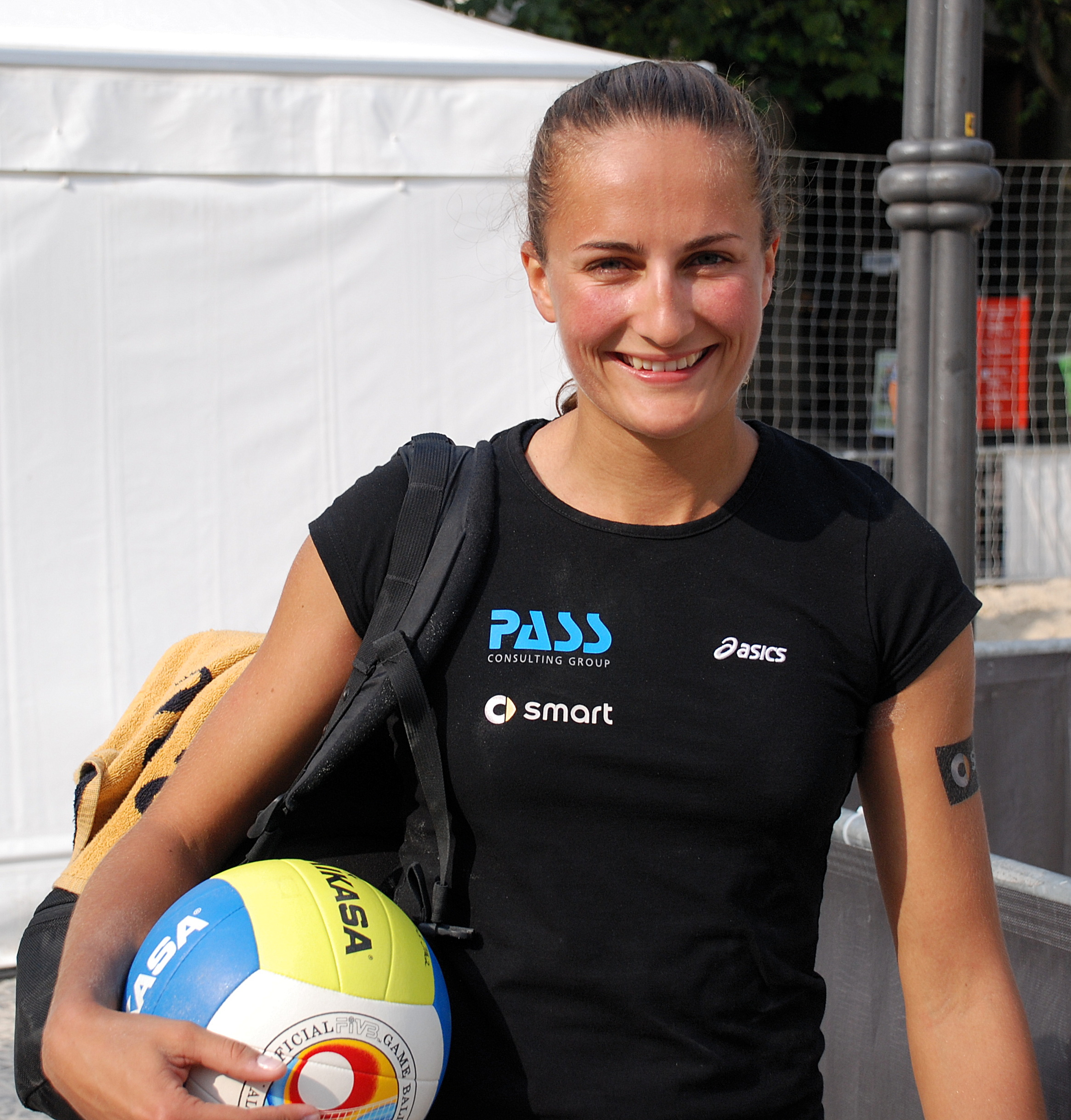

Personal information
- Nationality: German
- Born: 8 September 1985 (age 41); Aachen, West Germany
- Height: 183 cm (6 ft 0 in)
- Weight: 70 kg (154 lb)

Beach volleyball information
Years	Teammate
2002–05; 2006–16	Ruth Flemig; Katrin Holtwick
Honours
Women's beach volleyball
Representing Germany
FIVB World Tour
Silver medal – second place	2013 Berlin	Beach

Ilka Semmler (born 8 September 1985) is a German retired beach volleyball player. From 2006 to 2016, she played with Katrin Holtwick. They competed in the 2012 Summer Olympics in London, where they were eliminated in the first knock-out round by the other German team of Ludwig and Goller.

== Professional career ==
=== 2016 World Tour ===
At the 2016 Grand Slam in Long Beach, California, (Germany vs Germany) the pair finished 4th after a loss to their compatriots Chantal Laboureur/Julia Sude in straight sets (21-16, 21-17).

In September 2016, Semmler and Holtwick both retired after they were eliminated in the German Beach Volleyball Championship.

Awards
Preceded by Larissa França (BRA)	Women's FIVB World Tour "Best Setter"; 2013	Succeeded by Larissa França (BRA)
