= Jānis Šmēdiņš =

Latvian beach volleyball player (born 1987)

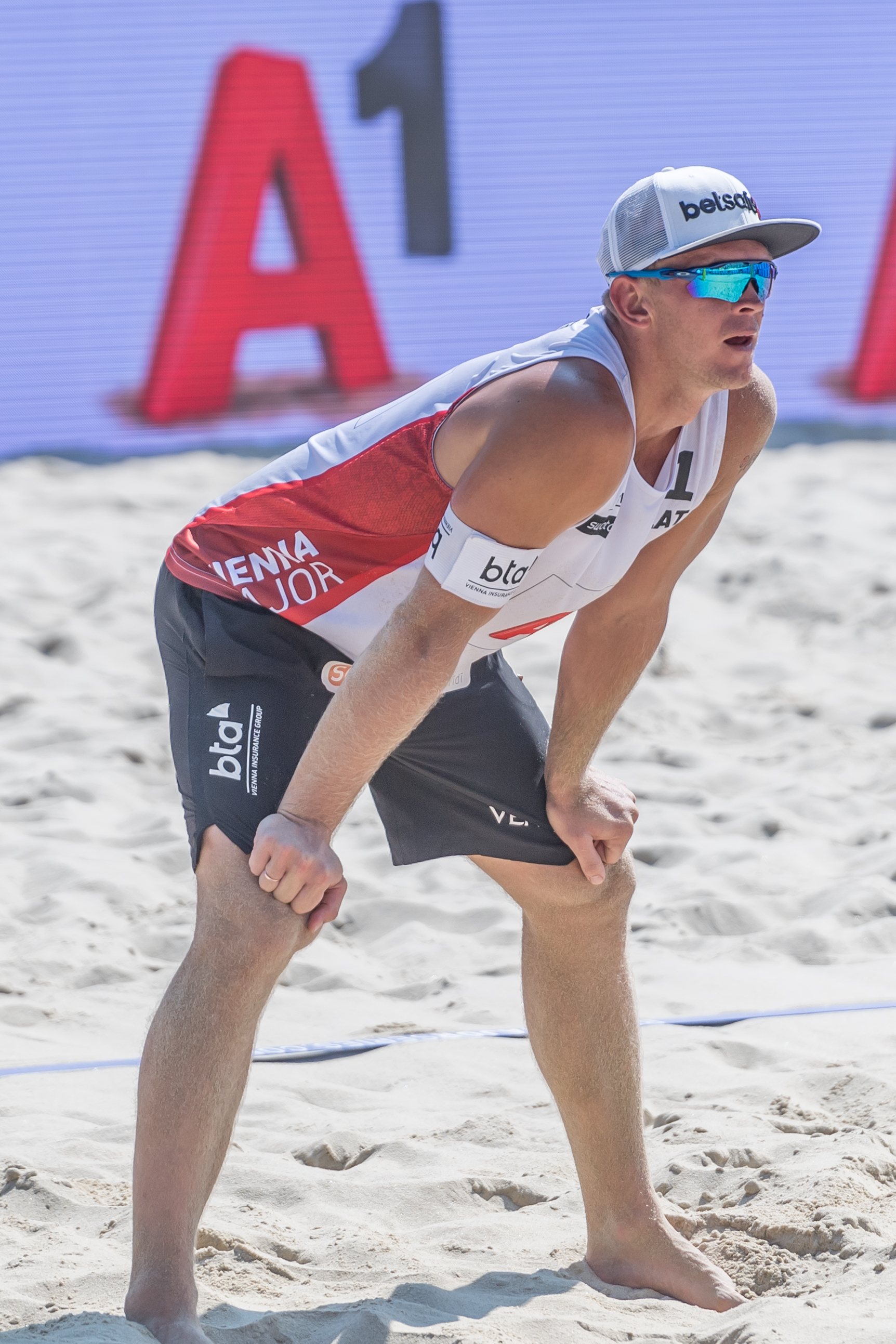

Personal information
- Nationality: Latvian
- Born: 31 July 1987 (age 39); Kuldīga, Latvia
- Height: 6 ft 3 in (191 cm)

Beach volleyball information

Current teammate
Teammate
Aleksandrs Samoilovs
Honours
Men's beach volleyball
Representing Latvia
Olympic Games
Bronze medal – third place	2012 London	Beach
European Championships
Gold medal – first place	2015 Klagenfurt	Beach
Silver medal – second place	2014 Cagliari	Beach
Silver medal – second place	2013 Klagenfurt	Beach
Bronze medal – third place	2010 Berlin	Beach

Jānis Šmēdiņš (born 31 July 1987) is a Latvian professional beach volleyball player. From 2008 to 2012, he played together with Mārtiņš Pļaviņš. They won the bronze medal at the European Championships 2010. Two years later, they won the bronze medal at the 2012 Olympic Games in London. After 2012, he played with Aleksandrs Samoilovs, and the duo were among world leaders before 2016 Olympic Games in Rio.

Sporting positions
Preceded by Jake Gibb and Sean Rosenthal (USA)	Men's FIVB Beach Volley World Tour Winner alongside (Latvia) Aleksandrs Samoilovs; 2013–2014	Succeeded by Alison Cerutti and Bruno Oscar Schmidt (BRA)
Preceded by Alison Cerutti and Bruno Oscar Schmidt (BRA)	Men's FIVB Beach Volley World Tour Winner alongside (Latvia) Aleksandrs Samoilovs; 2016	Succeeded by Evandro Oliveira and André Stein (BRA)
Awards
Preceded by Alison Cerutti (BRA)	Men's FIVB World Tour "Best Hitter"; 2013–2014	Succeeded by Christiaan Varenhorst (NED)
Preceded by Phil Dalhausser (USA)	Men's FIVB World Tour "Best Attacker"; 2013	Succeeded by Paolo Nicolai (ITA)
Preceded by Bruno Oscar Schmidt (BRA)	Men's FIVB World Tour "Best Attacker"; 2016	Succeeded by Phil Dalhausser (USA)
Preceded by Phil Dalhausser (USA)	Men's FIVB World Tour "Best Setter"; 2013	Succeeded by Phil Dalhausser (USA)
Preceded by Bartosz Łosiak (POL)	Men's FIVB World Tour "Best Setter"; 2018	Succeeded by Anders Mol (NOR)
Preceded by Emanuel Rego (BRA)	Men's FIVB World Tour "Sportsperson"; 2013	Succeeded by Emanuel Rego (BRA)
Preceded by Jake Gibb and Sean Rosenthal (USA)	Men's FIVB World Tour "Team of the Year" alongside (Latvia) Aleksandrs Samoilovs; 2013–2014	Succeeded by Alison Cerutti and Bruno Oscar Schmidt (BRA)
Preceded by Alison Cerutti and Bruno Oscar Schmidt (BRA)	Men's FIVB World Tour "Team of the Year" alongside (Latvia) Aleksandrs Samoilovs; 2016	Succeeded by Evandro Oliveira and André Stein (BRA)
