= Alison Cerutti =

Brazilian beach volleyball player

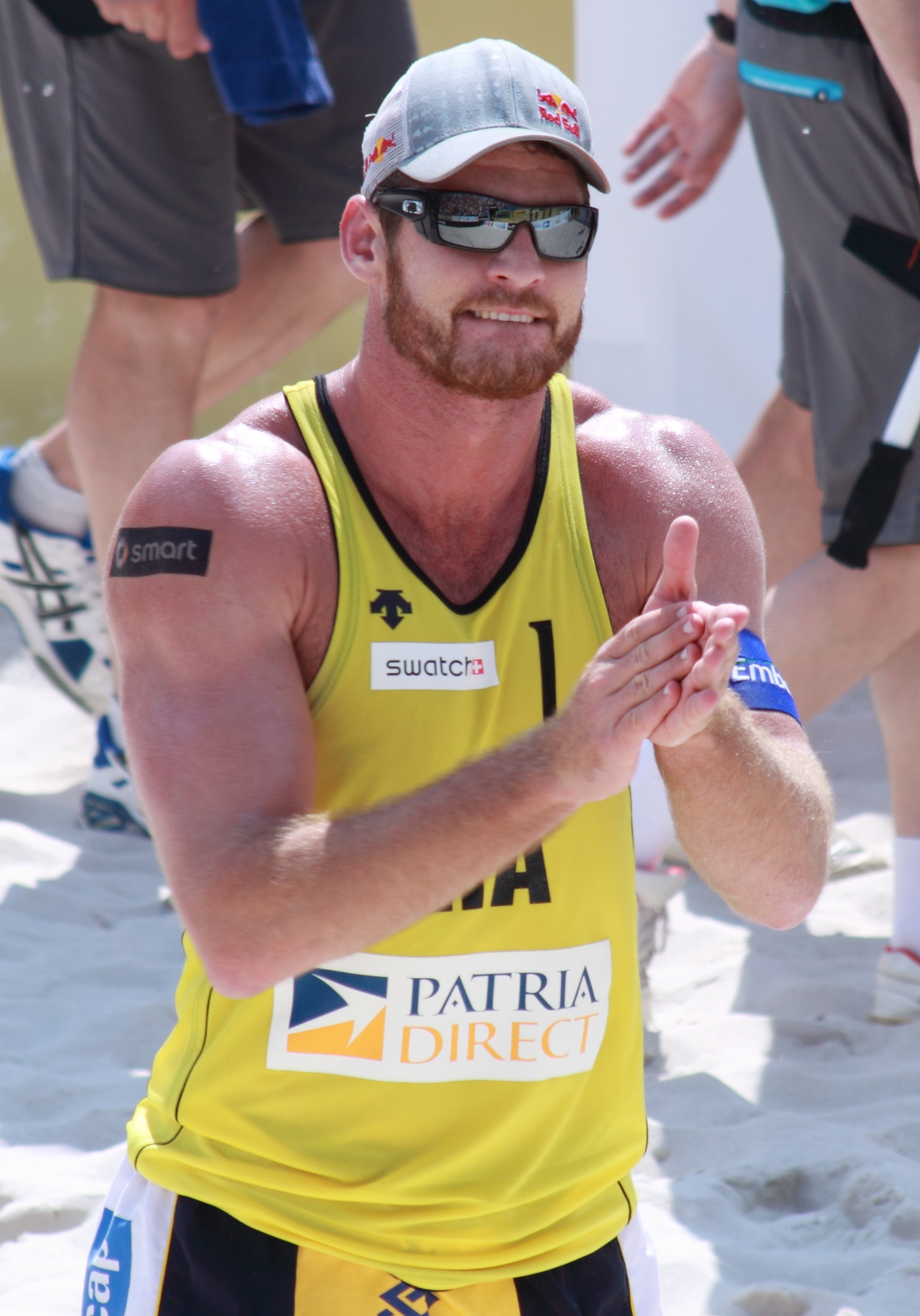
- Alison in 2011

Personal information
- Full name: Alison Conte Cerutti
- Nickname: Mammoth (Mamute in Portuguese)
- Born: 7 December 1985 (age 40); Vitória, Espírito Santo, Brazil
- Hometown: Rio de Janeiro, Brazil
- Height: 203 cm (6 ft 8 in)
- Weight: 106 kg (234 lb)

Beach volleyball information

Current teammate
Teammate
Gustavo Albrecht Carvalhaes

Previous teammates
Teammate
Alvaro Filho
André Stein Bruno Oscar Schmidt
Emanuel Rego
Honours
Men's beach volleyball
Representing Brazil
Olympic Games
Gold medal – first place	2016 Rio de Janeiro	Beach
Silver medal – second place	2012 London	Beach
World Championships
Gold medal – first place	2011 Rome	Beach
Gold medal – first place	2015 The Hague	Beach
Silver medal – second place	2009 Stavanger	Beach
World Tour
Gold medal – first place	2011	Beach
Gold medal – first place	2015	Beach
Gold medal – first place	2016 Porec	Beach
Pan American Games
Gold medal – first place	2011 Guadalajara	Beach

Alison Conte Cerutti (born 7 December 1985), known as Alison Cerutti or simply Alison, is a Brazilian beach volleyball player. He plays as a blocker. In 2011, along with Emanuel Rego he won the Swatch FIVB World Tour in Prague, Czech Republic. and the silver medal at the 2012 Summer Olympics. He won the gold medal at the 2015 World Championships in Netherlands. and the gold medal at the 2016 Summer Olympics in Rio alongside teammate Bruno Schmidt. In 2019, Alison partnered with Álvaro Morais Filho. The team won their first gold medal at the FIVB Kuala Lumpur event. The duo also competed in the Tokyo 2020 journey. Since 2021, Alison has been playing with Guto Carvalhaes.

== Career ==
Alison initially played volleyball in the hall before he came at the age of 16 years as a training partner of José Loiola for beach volleyball. At first, he felt cumbersome and was nicknamed "Mammoth" after a character from the movie Ice Age. In October 2006, he played his first tournaments on the FIVB World Tour with Harley Marques. After the duo was still inferior to the "Country Quota" in Vitória, they landed ninth place at the Acapulco Open. Together with Bernardo Romano, Alison got third in the 2007 Challenger tournament in Cyprus and reached the main draw in Åland. Alison / Romano achieved the same the following year in Stare Jabłonki. Then they successively won the Challenger tournaments in Brno and Pärnu and the satellite tournament in Lausanne. At the Grand Slam in Gstaad, Alison played with Emanuel Rego and finished third. With Bernardo Romano, he was ninth in Guarujá. In the last two tournaments of the year, he competed with Pedro Cunha. After a fifth place in Dubai, Alison / Pedro won the Manama Open against the French Andy and Kevin Cès.

In 2009, Alison played again with Harley Marques. At the first tournament in Brasília, Alison / Harley reached the final, which they lost to Emanuel / Ricardo. In the final of Shanghai, it came to the next Brazilian duel in the final; they won against Cunha / Solberg. After a third place in Rome, they succeeded in Mysłowice and won the next tournament victory against the US duo Matthew Fuerbringer / Jennings. They reached the quarter-finals at the World Championships in Stavanger without losing any set. With two tiebreak victories against Fuerbringer / Jennings and the German duo Klemperer / Koreng, they qualified for the final, in which they were up against the German duo Brink / Reckermann. Later in the World Tour, Alison / Harley remained in the top ten in all tournaments. Another final they reached at the Grand Slam in Klagenfurt against Dalhausser / Rogers. They finished the series as World Tour Champions.

In 2010, Alison played a duo with Emanuel Rego. In the first three tournaments of the World Tour 2010, it came each time to a duel with Rogers / Dalhausser. In Brasília and Rome, the Brazilians each time lost in the final. In Shanghai, they defeated the Americans in the match for third place. After a fourth place in Mysłowice and ninth place in Moscow, Alison / Emanuel also lost the final of Prague against Rogers / Dalhausser. In Gstaad, they missed the top ten of an FIVB tournament for the only time in their career together. Then they finished third in Klagenfurt and Kristiansand and fifth in Stare Jabłonki. In the first tournament of the World Tour 2011, they lost again against Rogers / Dalhausser in the final. At the Prague Open, they then succeeded in revenge, and in Beijing, they won the Grand Slam in the final against Brink / Reckermann. At the World Cup in Rome, they were unbeaten in the semifinals they won against the German defending champions. Then they also won the final against Márcio Araújo and Ricardo Santos. After a fifth place in Stavanger, the new world champions continued their successful series with tournament victories in Gstaad (against Rogers / Dalhausser) and Moscow (against the Swiss Bellaguarda / Heuscher). Then they had two third places in Stare Jabłonki and Åland. Alison / Emanuel became the World Tour Champion and "Team of the Year" of the FIVB. Alison also received Best Blocker, Best Hitter, and Best Offensive Player awards. In October, Alison / Emanuel won in the final against Hernandez / Mussa from Venezuela, which earned them the gold medal at the Pan American Games in Guadalajara.

At the beginning of the World Tour 2012, they finished seventh in Brasília, fifth in Shanghai, and third in Beijing. In Prague, they lost the final against Pedro Cunha and Ricardo Santos. In the final of Moscow, they then won against the Dutch Nummerdor / Schuil. In Rome and Gstaad, both times, they won against the US duo Gibb / Rosenthal before they could prevail in Berlin against the same opponent. At the Olympic Games in London, for which they had qualified as the best team in the Olympic rankings, they made it to the final unbeaten. There, they lost against the German duo Brink / Reckermann and won the silver medal. They finished the season in fifth place at the Grand Slam in Stare Jabłonki. On the World Tour 2013, they finished ninth in Corrientes, fifth in The Hague, and fourth in Rome. At the World Championships in Stare Jabłonki, Alison / Emanuel reached the semifinals after six wins in a row and lost the final against Ricardo / Filho. The match was the third they lost to the Germans, Erdmann / Matysik. Then they reached two fifth and two ninth places. The Grand Slam in São Paulo was their last joint FIVB tournament. Then Alison played the Grand Slam in Moscow with Vitor Gonçalves Felipe before the interim duo won the Grand Slam in Xiamen and finished ninth in Durban.

In 2014, Alison formed a new duo with Bruno Oscar Schmidt, with whom he won the South American Games in Santiago de Chile in March and made the final at the Fuzhou Open against the Italians Nicolai / Lupo. Apart from Shanghai, Alison / Bruno always landed in the top 10 at the World Tour 2014. They were, among other things, third in Berlin and only lost the final in Gstaad against Dalhausser / Rosenthal. In the final of the Grand Slam in Klagenfurt, they won their revenge against Nicolai / Lupo. The 2015 season began with a fourth-place finish in Moscow. After finishing 17th in the Poreč Major, they finished in ninth place twice. They only lost one set at the World Cup in the Netherlands until the finals. In the final, they won against the Dutch Nummerdor / Varenhorst. Alison became the world champion for the second time. Subsequently, Alison / Bruno successively won the Gstaad Major and the Grand Slams in Yokohama, Long Beach, and Olsztyn. They also won the World Tour Final against Dalhausser / Lucena. They became World Tour Champions and received the "Team of the Year" award.

At the beginning of the 2016 season, Alison / Bruno won the Vitória Open in the final against Nicolai / Lupo after fifth place in Rio de Janeiro. In the finals of the Grand Slams in Moscow and Olsztyn, they lost against Nummerdor / Varenhorst and the Latvians Samoilovs / Šmēdiņš. In the next tournament in Poreč, they succeeded against the Austrian duo Doppler / Horst and claimed victory. As world champions, they were set for the Olympic Games in Rio. Despite a defeat against Doppler / Horst, they won their group. With wins against Herrera / Gavira, Dalhausser / Lucena, and the Dutch Brouwer / Robert Meeuwsen, they made it to the finals and won 2–0 against Nicolai / Lupo in the finals. At the end of the season, Alison / Bruno also won the World Tour Final in Toronto. The Brazilians landed only in ninth at the 2017 World Cup in Vienna. After they couldn't catch up with their previous successes on the World Tour anymore, Alison and Bruno split in May 2018. Then Alison played alongside André Loyola Stein, and since April 2019, he has played with Álvaro Morais Filho.

Sporting positions
Preceded by Phil Dalhausser and Todd Rogers (USA)	Men's FIVB Beach Volley World Tour Winner alongside (Brazil) Emanuel Rego; 2011	Succeeded by Jake Gibb and Sean Rosenthal (USA)
Preceded by Jānis Šmēdiņš and Aleksandrs Samoilovs (LAT)	Men's FIVB Beach Volley World Tour Winner alongside (Brazil) Bruno Oscar Schmidt; 2015	Succeeded by Jānis Šmēdiņš and Aleksandrs Samoilovs (LAT)
Awards
Preceded by Phil Dalhausser (USA)	Men's FIVB World Tour "Best Blocker"; 2011	Succeeded by Phil Dalhausser (USA)
Preceded by Phil Dalhausser (USA)	Men's FIVB World Tour "Best Blocker"; 2015	Succeeded by Paolo Nicolai (ITA)
Preceded by Phil Dalhausser (USA)	Men's FIVB World Tour "Best Hitter"; 2011–2012	Succeeded by Jānis Šmēdiņš (LAT)
Preceded by Christiaan Varenhorst (NED)	Men's FIVB World Tour "Best Hitter"; 2016	Succeeded by Alexander Brouwer (NED)
Preceded by Phil Dalhausser (USA)	Men's FIVB World Tour "Best Attacker"; 2011	Succeeded by Phil Dalhausser (USA)
Preceded by Andy Cès (FRA)	Men's FIVB World Tour "Most Improved"; 2009	Succeeded by Bruno Oscar Schmidt (BRA)
Preceded by Phil Dalhausser and Todd Rogers (USA)	Men's FIVB World Tour "Team of the Year" alongside (Brazil) Emanuel Rego; 2011	Succeeded by Jake Gibb and Sean Rosenthal (USA)
Preceded by Jānis Šmēdiņš and Aleksandrs Samoilovs (LAT)	Men's FIVB World Tour "Team of the Year" alongside (Brazil) Bruno Oscar Schmidt; 2015	Succeeded by Jānis Šmēdiņš and Aleksandrs Samoilovs (LAT)
