= Paolo Nicolai =

Italian beach volleyball player

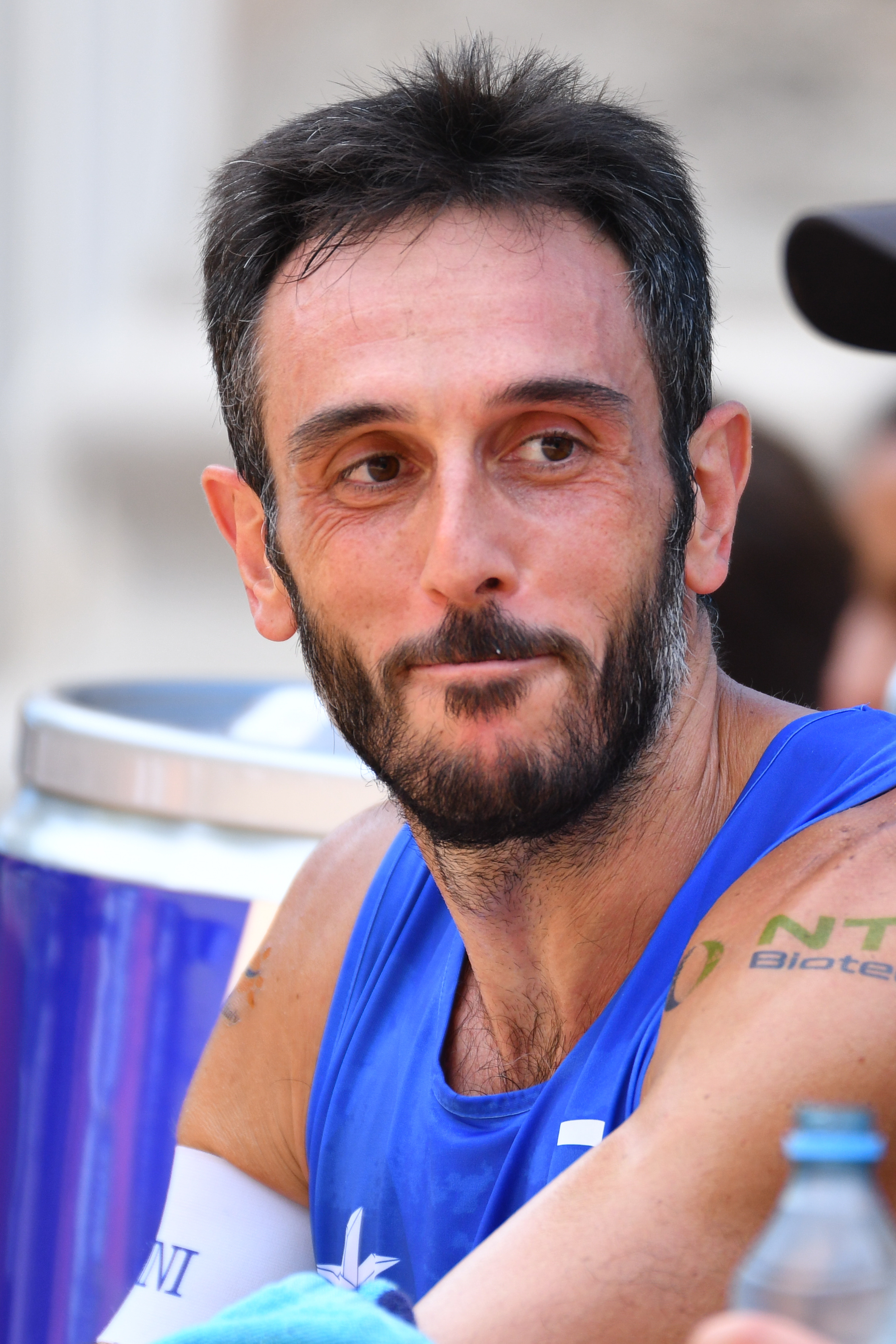
- Nicolai at EC 2022 in Munich

Personal information
- Nationality: Italian
- Born: 6 August 1988 (age 38); Ortona, Italy
- Height: 203 cm (6 ft 8 in)
Honours
Men's beach volleyball
Representing Italy
Olympic Games
Silver medal – second place	2016 Rio de Janeiro	Beach

Paolo Nicolai (born 6 August 1988) is an Italian beach volleyball player.

== Biography ==
Nicolai was born in Ortona, province of Chieti. In 2007 and 2008, he won the FIVB Youth Beach Volleyball World Championships (with Francesco Giontella).

From 2009 he played with different partners (Matteo Varnier and Matteo Martino), becoming an Italian champion once, until in 2011 the Italian federation had him partnered with Daniele Lupo. Lupo and Nicolai qualified for the 2012 Olympic Games, where they were eliminated by the Dutch team Nummerdor-Schuil in the quarter-finals. Nicolai was elected FIVB Most Improved Player 2012.

Lupo and Nicolai won the Beach Volleyball European World Championships twice, once in 2014 and again in 2016. A series of podiums in the World Tour also granted them the qualification for the 2016 Summer Olympics, where they reached the final, winning the silver medal. They reached the final, despite having to qualify as "lucky losers" from the pool stage.

Awards
Preceded by Jānis Šmēdiņš (LAT)	Men's FIVB World Tour "Best Attacker"; 2014	Succeeded by Bruno Oscar Schmidt (BRA)
Preceded by Mariusz Prudel (POL)	Men's FIVB World Tour "Most Improved"; 2012	Succeeded by Álvaro Morais Filho (BRA)
Preceded by Alison Cerutti (BRA)	Men's FIVB World Tour "Best Blocker"; 2016	Succeeded by Phil Dalhausser (USA)
