= 2017 Beach Volleyball World Championships =

2017 World Championship
- Location: Vienna, Austria
- Dates: 28 July – 6 August
- Website: Official website

Champions
- Men: Brazil; Evandro Oliveira; André Stein
- Women: Germany; Laura Ludwig; Kira Walkenhorst

The 2017 FIVB Beach Volleyball World Championships (also known as the FIVB Beach Volleyball World Championships presented by A1 due to sponsorship reasons) was the eleventh edition of the tournament and the world championship for the sport of beach volleyball for both men and women. The tournament was held from 28 July to 6 August 2017 in Vienna, Austria. The tournament had a prize money of US$500,000 per gender.

== Competition schedule ==
P	Preliminary round	LL	Lucky losers playoffs	1/16	Round of 32	1/8	Round of 16	1/4	Quarter-finals	1/2	Semi-finals	B	Bronze medal match	F	Final

Date Event	Fri 28	Sat 29	Sun 30	Mon 31	Tue 1		Wed 2		Thu 3	Fri 4		Sat 5		Sun 6		
Men's tournament	P	P	P	P	P		P	LL	1/16	1/8		1/4		1/2	B	F
Women's tournament	P	P	P	P	P	LL	1/16		1/8	1/4	1/2	B	F			

== Medal summary ==
=== Medal table ===
Rank	Nation	Gold	Silver	Bronze	Total
1	Brazil (BRA)	1	0	1	2
2	Germany (GER)	1	0	0	1
3	Austria (AUT)	0	1	0	1
3	United States (USA)	0	1	0	1
5	Russia (RUS)	0	0	1	1
Totals (5 entries)		2	2	2	6

=== Medal events ===
Event	Gold	Silver	Bronze
Men	Evandro Oliveira and André Stein (BRA)	Clemens Doppler and Alexander Horst (AUT)	Viacheslav Krasilnikov and Nikita Liamin (RUS)
Women	Laura Ludwig and Kira Walkenhorst (GER)	April Ross and Lauren Fendrick (USA)	Larissa França and Talita Antunes (BRA)

== Men's tournament ==
=== Knockout stage bracket ===
Round of 32
3 August
González – Nivaldo (CUB)	2
Seidl – Winter (AUT)	0
3 August
Varenhorst – van Garderen (NED)	2
Álvaro – Saymon (BRA)	0
3 August
Herrera – Gavira (ESP)	2
Fijałek – Bryl (POL)	0
3 August
Ermacora – Pristauz (AUT)	1
Pedro – Guto (BRA)	2
3 August
Alison – Bruno (BRA)	2
Tocs – Finsters (LAT)	0
3 August
Grimalt – Grimalt (CHI)	0
Saxton – Schalk (CAN)	2
3 August
Doherty – Hyden (USA)	1
Šmēdiņš – Samoilovs (LAT)	2
3 August
Pļaviņš – Regža (LAT)	0
Evandro – André (BRA)	2
3 August
Dalhausser – Lucena (USA)	2
Ranghieri – Carambula (ITA)	0
3 August
Gibb – Crabb (USA)	0
McHugh – Schumann (AUS)	2
3 August
Nicolai – Lupo (ITA)	0
Pedlow – Schachter (CAN)	2
3 August
Stoyanovskiy – Yarzutkin (RUS)	1
Krasilnikov – Liamin (RUS)	2
3 August
Łosiak – Kantor (POL)	2
Virgen – Ontiveros (MEX)	1
3 August
Koekelkoren – van Walle (BEL)	2
Brouwer – Meeuwsen (NED)	1
3 August
Doppler – Horst (AUT)	2
Brunner – Patterson (USA)	1
3 August
Prudel – Kujawiak (POL)	0
Jefferson – Cherif (QAT)	2

Round of 16
4 August
González – Nivaldo (CUB)	1
Varenhorst – van Garderen (NED)	2
4 August
Herrera – Gavira (ESP)	2
Pedro – Guto (BRA)	1
4 August
Alison – Bruno (BRA)	1
Saxton – Schalk (CAN)	2
4 August
Šmēdiņš – Samoilovs (LAT)	0
Evandro – André (BRA)	2
4 August
Dalhausser – Lucena (USA)	2
McHugh – Schumann (AUS)	1
4 August
Pedlow – Schachter (CAN)	0
Krasilnikov – Liamin (RUS)	2
4 August
Łosiak – Kantor (POL)	2
Koekelkoren – van Walle (BEL)	1
4 August
Doppler – Horst (AUT)	2
Jefferson – Cherif (QAT)	0

Quarter-finals
5 August
Varenhorst – van Garderen (NED)	2
Herrera – Gavira (ESP)	1
5 August
Saxton – Schalk (CAN)	1
Evandro – André (BRA)	2
5 August
Dalhausser – Lucena (USA)	0
Krasilnikov – Liamin (RUS)	2
5 August
Łosiak – Kantor (POL)	1
Doppler – Horst (AUT)	2

Semi-finals
6 August
Varenhorst – van Garderen (NED)	0
Evandro – André (BRA)	2
6 August
Krasilnikov – Liamin (RUS)	0
Doppler – Horst (AUT)	2

Final
6 August
Evandro – André (BRA)	2
Doppler – Horst (AUT)	0
3rd place match
6 August
Varenhorst – van Garderen (NED)	0
Krasilnikov – Liamin (RUS)	2

== Women's tournament ==
=== Knockout stage bracket ===
Round of 32
2 August
Larissa – Talita (BRA)	2
Zonta – Gallay (ARG)	0
2 August
Mashkova – Samalikova (KAZ)	0
Heidrich – Vergé-Dépré (SUI)	2
2 August
Antonelli – Carol (BRA)	2
Bawden – Clancy (AUS)	1
2 August
Davidova – Shchypkova (UKR)	1
Maia – Lima (BRA)	2
2 August
Summer – Sweat (USA)	2
Xue – Wang X. (CHN)	1
2 August
Flier – van Iersel (NED)	0
Kolocová – Kvapilová (CZE)	2
2 August
Hughes – Claes (USA)	2
Elsa – Amaranta (ESP)	0
2 August
Yue – Wang F. (CHN)	0
Ludwig – Walkenhorst (GER)	2
2 August
Meppelink – van Gestel (NED)	0
Lidy – Leila (CUB)	2
2 August
Wilkerson – Bansley (CAN)	2
Borger – Kozuch (GER)	0
2 August
Ross – Fendrick (USA)	2
Day – Branagh (USA)	1
2 August
Ágatha – Duda (BRA)	1
Hermannová – Sluková (CZE)	2
2 August
Pavan – Humana-Paredes (CAN)	2
Bárbara – Fernanda (BRA)	0
2 August
Schwaiger – Schützenhöfer (AUT)	0
Betschart – Hüberli (SUI)	2
2 August
Gordon – Saxton (CAN)	0
Lehtonen – Lahti (FIN)	2
2 August
Glenzke – Großner (GER)	0
Laboureur – Sude (GER)	2

Round of 16
3 August
Larissa – Talita (BRA)	2
Heidrich – Vergé-Dépré (SUI)	0
3 August
Antonelli – Carol (BRA)	2
Maia – Lima (BRA)	0
3 August
Summer – Sweat (USA)	2
Kolocová – Kvapilová (CZE)	1
3 August
Hughes – Claes (USA)	0
Ludwig – Walkenhorst (GER)	2
3 August
Lidy – Leila (CUB)	1
Wilkerson – Bansley (CAN)	2
3 August
Ross – Fendrick (USA)	2
Hermannová – Sluková (CZE)	1
3 August
Pavan – Humana-Paredes (CAN)	2
Betschart – Hüberli (SUI)	0
3 August
Lehtonen – Lahti (FIN)	0
Laboureur – Sude (GER)	2

Quarter-finals
4 August
Larissa – Talita (BRA)	2
Antonelli – Carol (BRA)	0
4 August
Summer – Sweat (USA)	0
Ludwig – Walkenhorst (GER)	2
4 August
Wilkerson – Bansley (CAN)	0
Ross – Fendrick (USA)	2
4 August
Pavan – Humana-Paredes (CAN)	2
Laboureur – Sude (GER)	0

Semi-finals
4 August
Larissa – Talita (BRA)	0
Ludwig – Walkenhorst (GER)	2
4 August
Ross – Fendrick (USA)	2
Pavan – Humana-Paredes (CAN)	1

Final
5 August
Ludwig – Walkenhorst (GER)	2
Ross – Fendrick (USA)	1
3rd place match
5 August
Larissa – Talita (BRA)	2
Pavan – Humana-Paredes (CAN)	1
