= 2017 Beach Volleyball World Championships – Women's tournament =

Tournament details
- Host country: Austria
- City: Vienna
- Dates: 28 June – 5 July
- Teams: 48 (from 5 confederations)

Final positions
- Champions: Germany; Laura Ludwig; Kira Walkenhorst (1st title)
- Runners-up: United States; April Ross; Lauren Fendrick
- Third place: Brazil; Larissa França; Talita Antunes
- Fourth place: Canada; Sarah Pavan; Melissa Humana-Paredes

The women's tournament was held from 28 July to 5 August 2017.

Laura Ludwig and Kira Walkenhorst won the title, defeating April Ross and Lauren Fendrick in the final, 19–21, 21–13, 15–9. The German pair became the first women's team from Europe to win a gold medal at the World Championships.

== Preliminary round ==
Qualified for the Round of 32 as pool winners or runners-up
Qualified for the Round of 32 as one of the best four third-placed teams
Qualified for the Lucky Losers Playoffs
Eliminated

=== Pool A ===
Pos	Team	Pld	W	L	Pts	SW	SL	SR	SPW	SPL	SPR
1	(Brazil) Larissa–Talita	3	3	0	6	6	1	6.000	139	98	1.418
2	(United States) Day–Branagh	3	2	1	5	4	2	2.000	113	112	1.009
3	(Germany) Bieneck–Schneider	3	1	2	4	2	4	0.500	116	121	0.959
4	(Austria) Strauss–Holzer	3	0	3	3	1	6	0.167	102	139	0.734

Date	Time		Score		Set 1	Set 2	Set 3	Total	Report
29 Jul	12:00	Bieneck–Schneider (Germany)	0–2	(United States) Day–Branagh	16–21	24–26		40–47	Report
29 Jul	17:00	Larissa–Talita (Brazil)	2–1	(Austria) Strauss–Holzer	21–11	19–21	15–8	55–40	Report
30 Jul	14:00	Bieneck–Schneider (Germany)	2–0	(Austria) Strauss–Holzer	21–19	21–13		42–32	Report
30 Jul	18:00	Larissa–Talita (Brazil)	2–0	(United States) Day–Branagh	21–15	21–9		42–24	Report
1 Aug	12:30	Larissa–Talita (Brazil)	2–0	(Germany) Bieneck–Schneider	21–16	21–18		42–34	Report
1 Aug	12:30	Day–Branagh (United States)	2–0	(Austria) Strauss–Holzer	21–19	21–11		42–30	Report

=== Pool B ===
Pos	Team	Pld	W	L	Pts	SW	SL	SR	SPW	SPL	SPR
1	(Germany) Laboureur–Sude	3	3	0	6	6	0	MAX	126	91	1.385
2	(Spain) Elsa–Amaranta	3	2	1	5	4	2	2.000	117	105	1.114
3	(Cuba) Lidy–Leila	3	1	2	4	2	4	0.500	104	114	0.912
4	(Colombia) Andrea–Gorda	3	0	3	3	0	6	0.000	89	126	0.706

Date	Time		Score		Set 1	Set 2	Set 3	Total	Report
29 Jul	14:00	Laboureur–Sude (Germany)	2–0	(Colombia) Andrea–Gorda	21–14	21–14		42–28	Report
29 Jul	14:00	Elsa–Amaranta (Spain)	2–0	(Cuba) Lidy–Leila	21–15	21–17		42–32	Report
30 Jul	12:00	Laboureur–Sude (Germany)	2–0	(Cuba) Lidy–Leila	21–16	21–14		42–30	Report
30 Jul	13:00	Elsa–Amaranta (Spain)	2–0	(Colombia) Andrea–Gorda	21–14	21–17		42–31	Report
1 Aug	9:30	Laboureur–Sude (Germany)	2–0	(Spain) Elsa–Amaranta	21–17	21–16		42–33	Report
1 Aug	9:30	Lidy–Leila (Cuba)	2–0	(Colombia) Andrea–Gorda	21–16	21–14		42–30	Report

=== Pool C ===
Pos	Team	Pld	W	L	Pts	SW	SL	SR	SPW	SPL	SPR
1	(Netherlands) Meppelink–van Gestel	3	2	1	5	4	2	2.000	120	88	1.364
2	(Canada) Gordon–Saxton	3	2	1	5	5	2	2.500	137	112	1.223
3	(Brazil) Ágatha–Duda	3	2	1	5	4	3	1.333	133	110	1.209
4	(Kenya) Gaudencia–Too	3	0	3	3	0	6	0.000	46	126	0.365

Date	Time		Score		Set 1	Set 2	Set 3	Total	Report
29 Jul	10:00	Ágatha–Duda (Brazil)	2–0	(Kenya) Gaudencia–Too	21–7	21–8		42–15	Report
29 Jul	11:00	Meppelink–van Gestel (Netherlands)	0–2	(Canada) Gordon–Saxton	19–21	17–21		36–42	Report
30 Jul	13:00	Ágatha–Duda (Brazil)	2–1	(Canada) Gordon–Saxton	27–25	15–21	15–7	57–53	Report
30 Jul	17:00	Meppelink–van Gestel (Netherlands)	2–0	(Kenya) Gaudencia–Too	21–5	21–7		42–12	Report
1 Aug	10:30	Ágatha–Duda (Brazil)	0–2	(Netherlands) Meppelink–van Gestel	19–21	15–21		34–42	Report
1 Aug	10:30	Gordon–Saxton (Canada)	2–0	(Kenya) Gaudencia–Too	21–9	21–10		42–19	Report

=== Pool D ===
Pos	Team	Pld	W	L	Pts	SW	SL	SR	SPW	SPL	SPR
1	(Germany) Ludwig–Walkenhorst	3	3	0	6	6	1	6.000	137	107	1.280
2	(Germany) Borger–Kozuch	3	2	1	5	4	2	2.000	121	96	1.260
3	(Germany) Glenzke–Großner	3	1	2	4	3	4	0.750	123	116	1.060
4	(Morocco) Mahassine–Zeroual	3	0	3	3	0	6	0.000	64	126	0.508

Date	Time		Score		Set 1	Set 2	Set 3	Total	Report
28 Jul	13:00	Borger–Kozuch (Germany)	2–0	(Germany) Glenzke–Großner	21–16	21–17		42–33	Report
28 Jul	15:00	Ludwig–Walkenhorst (Germany)	2–0	(Morocco) Mahassine–Zeroual	21–10	21–12		42–22	Report
29 Jul	13:00	Ludwig–Walkenhorst (Germany)	2–1	(Germany) Glenzke–Großner	17–21	21–15	15–12	53–48	Report
29 Jul	18:00	Borger–Kozuch (Germany)	2–0	(Morocco) Mahassine–Zeroual	21–10	21–11		42–21	Report
31 Jul	14:00	Ludwig–Walkenhorst (Germany)	2–0	(Germany) Borger–Kozuch	21–19	21–18		42–37	Report
31 Jul	18:00	Glenzke–Großner (Germany)	2–0	(Morocco) Mahassine–Zeroual	21–12	21–9		42–21	Report

=== Pool E ===
Pos	Team	Pld	W	L	Pts	SW	SL	SR	SPW	SPL	SPR
1	(United States) Summer–Sweat	3	2	1	5	5	2	2.500	137	119	1.151
2	(Kazakhstan) Mashkova–Samalikova	3	2	1	5	4	2	2.000	122	109	1.119
3	(Ukraine) Davidova–Shchypkova	3	2	1	5	4	4	1.000	138	132	1.045
4	(Austria) Rimser–Plesiutschnig	3	0	3	3	1	6	0.167	99	136	0.728

Date	Time		Score		Set 1	Set 2	Set 3	Total	Report
28 Jul	13:00	Summer–Sweat (United States)	2–0	(Austria) Rimser–Plesiutschnig	21–15	21–14		42–29	Report
28 Jul	13:00	Davidova–Shchypkova (Ukraine)	0–2	(Kazakhstan) Mashkova–Samalikova	18–21	16–21		34–42	Report
30 Jul	16:00	Summer–Sweat (United States)	2–0	(Kazakhstan) Mashkova–Samalikova	21–15	25–23		46–38	Report
30 Jul	16:00	Davidova–Shchypkova (Ukraine)	2–1	(Austria) Rimser–Plesiutschnig	21–13	16–21	15–7	52–41	Report
1 Aug	11:30	Summer–Sweat (United States)	1–2	(Ukraine) Davidova–Shchypkova	17–21	21–16	11–15	49–52	Report
1 Aug	11:30	Mashkova–Samalikova (Kazakhstan)	2–0	(Austria) Rimser–Plesiutschnig	21–15	21–14		42–29	Report

=== Pool F ===
Pos	Team	Pld	W	L	Pts	SW	SL	SR	SPW	SPL	SPR
1	(Czech Republic) Hermannová–Sluková	3	3	0	6	6	0	MAX	126	72	1.750
2	(Finland) Lehtonen–Lahti	3	2	1	5	4	2	2.000	109	88	1.239
3	(Paraguay) Filippo–Érika	3	1	2	4	2	5	0.400	108	135	0.800
4	(Costa Rica) Alfaro–Charles	3	0	3	3	1	6	0.167	94	142	0.662

Date	Time		Score		Set 1	Set 2	Set 3	Total	Report
29 Jul	16:00	Hermannová–Sluková (Czech Republic)	2–0	(Costa Rica) Alfaro–Charles	21–9	21–10		42–19	Report
29 Jul	17:00	Lehtonen–Lahti (Finland)	2–0	(Paraguay) Filippo–Érika	21–13	21–9		42–22	Report
30 Jul	18:00	Hermannová–Sluková (Czech Republic)	2–0	(Paraguay) Filippo–Érika	21–11	21–17		42–28	Report
30 Jul	19:00	Lehtonen–Lahti (Finland)	2–0	(Costa Rica) Alfaro–Charles	21–15	21–9		42–24	Report
31 Jul	17:00	Hermannová–Sluková (Czech Republic)	2–0	(Finland) Lehtonen–Lahti	21–8	21–17		42–25	Report
31 Jul	19:00	Filippo–Érika (Paraguay)	2–1	(Costa Rica) Alfaro–Charles	21–17	22–24	15–10	58–51	Report

=== Pool G ===
Pos	Team	Pld	W	L	Pts	SW	SL	SR	SPW	SPL	SPR
1	(Canada) Pavan–Humana-Paredes	3	3	0	6	6	0	MAX	128	92	1.391
2	(Netherlands) Flier–van Iersel	3	2	1	5	4	4	1.000	148	151	0.980
3	(China) Yue–Wang F.	3	1	2	4	3	5	0.600	137	135	1.015
4	(Italy) Menegatti–Perry	3	0	3	3	2	6	0.333	120	155	0.774

Date	Time		Score		Set 1	Set 2	Set 3	Total	Report
28 Jul	10:00	Pavan–Humana-Paredes (Canada)	2–0	(Netherlands) Flier–van Iersel	21–13	23–21		44–34	Report
28 Jul	11:00	Yue–Wang F. (China)	2–1	(Italy) Menegatti–Perry	19–21	21–10	15–6	55–37	Report
30 Jul	10:00	Yue–Wang F. (China)	1–2	(Netherlands) Flier–van Iersel	20–22	21–19	12–15	53–56	Report
30 Jul	11:00	Pavan–Humana-Paredes (Canada)	2–0	(Italy) Menegatti–Perry	21–16	21–13		42–29	Report
31 Jul	12:00	Pavan–Humana-Paredes (Canada)	2–0	(China) Yue–Wang F.	21–16	21–13		42–29	Report
31 Jul	13:00	Menegatti–Perry (Italy)	1–2	(Netherlands) Flier–van Iersel	18–21	24–22	12–15	54–58	Report

=== Pool H ===
Pos	Team	Pld	W	L	Pts	SW	SL	SR	SPW	SPL	SPR
1	(Brazil) Maia–Lima	3	3	0	6	6	2	3.000	142	120	1.183
2	(Switzerland) Heidrich–Vergé-Dépré	3	2	1	5	5	2	2.500	141	110	1.282
3	(Brazil) Bárbara–Fernanda	3	1	2	4	3	4	0.750	134	102	1.314
4	(Mozambique) Manhica–Muianga	3	0	3	3	0	6	0.000	41	126	0.325

Date	Time		Score		Set 1	Set 2	Set 3	Total	Report
28 Jul	18:00	Bárbara–Fernanda (Brazil)	1–2	(Brazil) Maia–Lima	21–10	16–21	15–17	52–48	Report
28 Jul	18:00	Heidrich–Vergé-Dépré (Switzerland)	2–0	(Mozambique) Manhica–Muianga	21–10	21–8		42–18	Report
29 Jul	15:00	Bárbara–Fernanda (Brazil)	2–0	(Mozambique) Manhica–Muianga	21–4	21–6		42–10	Report
29 Jul	18:00	Heidrich–Vergé-Dépré (Switzerland)	1–2	(Brazil) Maia–Lima	24–26	21–11	10–15	55–52	Report
31 Jul	15:00	Maia–Lima (Brazil)	2–0	(Mozambique) Manhica–Muianga	21–5	21–8		42–13	Report
31 Jul	17:00	Bárbara–Fernanda (Brazil)	0–2	(Switzerland) Heidrich–Vergé-Dépré	21–23	19–21		40–44	Report

=== Pool I ===
Pos	Team	Pld	W	L	Pts	SW	SL	SR	SPW	SPL	SPR
1	(Brazil) Antonelli–Carol	3	3	0	6	6	1	6.000	138	74	1.865
2	(United States) Hughes–Claes	3	2	1	5	5	2	2.500	129	104	1.240
3	(Canada) Pischke–Broder	3	1	2	4	2	4	0.500	100	105	0.952
4	(Rwanda) Nzayisenga–Mutatsimpundu	3	0	3	3	0	6	0.000	42	126	0.333

Date	Time		Score		Set 1	Set 2	Set 3	Total	Report
28 Jul	14:00	Hughes–Claes (United States)	2–0	(Canada) Pischke–Broder	21–15	21–14		42–29	Report
28 Jul	17:00	Antonelli–Carol (Brazil)	w/o	(Rwanda) Nzayisenga–Mutatsimpundu	21–0	21–0		42–0	Report
29 Jul	19:00	Antonelli–Carol (Brazil)	2–0	(Canada) Pischke–Broder	21–14	21–15		42–29	Report
29 Jul	19:00	Hughes–Claes (United States)	2–0	(Rwanda) Nzayisenga–Mutatsimpundu	21–10	21–11		42–21	Report
31 Jul	16:00	Antonelli–Carol (Brazil)	2–1	(United States) Hughes–Claes	18–21	21–16	15–8	54–45	Report
31 Jul	16:00	Pischke–Broder (Canada)	2–0	(Rwanda) Nzayisenga–Mutatsimpundu	21–12	21–9		42–21	Report

=== Pool J ===
Pos	Team	Pld	W	L	Pts	SW	SL	SR	SPW	SPL	SPR
1	(Switzerland) Betschart–Hüberli	3	3	0	6	6	1	6.000	139	117	1.188
2	(Canada) Wilkerson–Bansley	3	2	1	5	4	2	2.000	120	86	1.395
3	(Argentina) Zonta–Gallay	3	1	2	4	3	4	0.750	112	132	0.848
4	(Venezuela) Gabi–Agudo	3	0	3	3	0	6	0.000	90	126	0.714

Date	Time		Score		Set 1	Set 2	Set 3	Total	Report
28 Jul	17:00	Wilkerson–Bansley (Canada)	2–0	(Argentina) Zonta–Gallay	21–12	21–10		42–22	Report
28 Jul	19:00	Betschart–Hüberli (Switzerland)	2–0	(Venezuela) Gabi–Agudo	21–18	21–15		42–33	Report
30 Jul	16:00	Wilkerson–Bansley (Canada)	2–0	(Venezuela) Gabi–Agudo	21–11	21–11		42–22	Report
30 Jul	17:00	Betschart–Hüberli (Switzerland)	2–1	(Argentina) Zonta–Gallay	21–15	19–21	15–12	55–48	Report
31 Jul	11:00	Betschart–Hüberli (Switzerland)	2–0	(Canada) Wilkerson–Bansley	21–17	21–19		42–36	Report
31 Jul	14:00	Zonta–Gallay (Argentina)	2–0	(Venezuela) Gabi–Agudo	21–17	21–18		42–35	Report

=== Pool K ===
Pos	Team	Pld	W	L	Pts	SW	SL	SR	SPW	SPL	SPR
1	(United States) Ross–Fendrick	3	3	0	6	6	1	6.000	140	106	1.321
2	(Australia) Bawden–Clancy	3	2	1	5	4	4	1.000	141	145	0.972
3	(China) Xue–Wang X.	3	1	2	4	4	4	1.000	145	140	1.036
4	(Australia) Laird–Ngauamo	3	0	3	3	1	6	0.167	105	140	0.750

Date	Time		Score		Set 1	Set 2	Set 3	Total	Report
28 Jul	12:00	Bawden–Clancy (Australia)	2–1	(Australia) Laird–Ngauamo	19–21	22–20	15–7	56–48	Report
28 Jul	17:00	Ross–Fendrick (United States)	2–1	(China) Xue–Wang X.	21–17	20–22	15–9	56–48	Report
30 Jul	14:00	Bawden–Clancy (Australia)	2–1	(China) Xue–Wang X.	18–21	21–19	17–15	56–55	Report
30 Jul	15:00	Ross–Fendrick (United States)	2–0	(Australia) Laird–Ngauamo	21–11	21–18		42–29	Report
31 Jul	10:00	Bawden–Clancy (Australia)	0–2	(United States) Ross–Fendrick	16–21	13–21		29–42	Report
31 Jul	11:00	Laird–Ngauamo (Australia)	0–2	(China) Xue–Wang X.	11–21	17–21		28–42	Report

=== Pool L ===
Pos	Team	Pld	W	L	Pts	SW	SL	SR	SPW	SPL	SPR
1	(Czech Republic) Kolocová–Kvapilová	3	3	0	6	6	3	2.000	184	170	1.082
2	(Austria) Schwaiger–Schützenhöfer	3	2	1	5	5	3	1.667	159	150	1.060
3	(Russia) Birlova–Makroguzova	3	1	2	4	3	4	0.750	144	144	1.000
4	(Thailand) Radarong–Udomchavee	3	0	3	3	2	6	0.333	133	156	0.853

Date	Time		Score		Set 1	Set 2	Set 3	Total	Report
28 Jul	14:00	Kolocová–Kvapilová (Czech Republic)	2–1	(Russia) Birlova–Makroguzova	27–29	27–25	15–10	69–64	Report
28 Jul	15:00	Schwaiger–Schützenhöfer (Austria)	2–1	(Thailand) Radarong–Udomchavee	21–16	20–22	17–15	58–53	Report
29 Jul	16:00	Schwaiger–Schützenhöfer (Austria)	2–0	(Russia) Birlova–Makroguzova	23–21	21–17		44–38	Report
29 Jul	17:00	Kolocová–Kvapilová (Czech Republic)	2–1	(Thailand) Radarong–Udomchavee	21–14	20–22	15–13	56–49	Report
31 Jul	10:00	Birlova–Makroguzova (Russia)	2–0	(Thailand) Radarong–Udomchavee	21–15	21–16		42–31	Report
31 Jul	16:00	Schwaiger–Schützenhöfer (Austria)	1–2	(Czech Republic) Kolocová–Kvapilová	29–31	21–13	7–15	57–59	Report

=== 3rd place ranked teams ===
The four best third-placed teams will advance directly to the round of 32. The other eight third-placed teams will play in the Lucky Losers Playoffs for the additional four spots in the Round of 32.

Pos	Team	Pld	W	L	Pts	SW	SL	SR	SPW	SPL	SPR
1	(Brazil) Ágatha–Duda	3	2	1	5	4	3	1.333	133	110	1.209
2	(Ukraine) Davidova–Shchypkova	3	2	1	5	4	4	1.000	138	132	1.045
3	(China) Xue–Wang X.	3	1	2	4	4	4	1.000	145	140	1.036
4	(Brazil) Bárbara–Fernanda	3	1	2	4	3	4	0.750	134	102	1.314
5	(Germany) Glenzke–Großner	3	1	2	4	3	4	0.750	123	116	1.060
6	(Russia) Birlova–Makroguzova	3	1	2	4	3	4	0.750	144	144	1.000
7	(Argentina) Zonta–Gallay	3	1	2	4	3	4	0.750	112	132	0.848
8	(China) Yue–Wang F.	3	1	2	4	3	5	0.600	137	135	1.015
9	(Germany) Bieneck–Schneider	3	1	2	4	2	4	0.500	116	121	0.959
10	(Canada) Pischke–Broder	3	1	2	4	2	4	0.500	100	105	0.952
11	(Cuba) Lidy–Leila	3	1	2	4	2	4	0.500	104	114	0.912
12	(Paraguay) Filippo–Érika	3	1	2	4	2	5	0.400	108	135	0.800

== Lucky losers playoffs ==
Date	Time		Score		Set 1	Set 2	Set 3	Total	Report
1 Aug	17:30	Birlova–Makroguzova (Russia)	0–2	(Cuba) Lidy–Leila	14–21	19–21		33–42	Report
1 Aug	17:30	Zonta–Gallay (Argentina)	2–1	(Canada) Pischke–Broder	18–21	21–19	15–7	54–47	Report
1 Aug	17:30	Yue–Wang F. (China)	2–1	(Germany) Bieneck–Schneider	21–19	18–21	15–7	54–47	Report
1 Aug	18:45	Glenzke–Großner (Germany)	2–0	(Paraguay) Filippo–Érika	21–12	21–18		42–30	Report

== Knockout stage ==
=== Bracket ===
Round of 32
2 August
Larissa – Talita (BRA)	2
Zonta – Gallay (ARG)	0
2 August
Mashkova – Samalikova (KAZ)	0
Heidrich – Vergé-Dépré (SUI)	2
2 August
Antonelli – Carol (BRA)	2
Bawden – Clancy (AUS)	1
2 August
Davidova – Shchypkova (UKR)	1
Maia – Lima (BRA)	2
2 August
Summer – Sweat (USA)	2
Xue – Wang X. (CHN)	1
2 August
Flier – van Iersel (NED)	0
Kolocová – Kvapilová (CZE)	2
2 August
Hughes – Claes (USA)	2
Elsa – Amaranta (ESP)	0
2 August
Yue – Wang F. (CHN)	0
Ludwig – Walkenhorst (GER)	2
2 August
Meppelink – van Gestel (NED)	0
Lidy – Leila (CUB)	2
2 August
Wilkerson – Bansley (CAN)	2
Borger – Kozuch (GER)	0
2 August
Ross – Fendrick (USA)	2
Day – Branagh (USA)	1
2 August
Ágatha – Duda (BRA)	1
Hermannová – Sluková (CZE)	2
2 August
Pavan – Humana-Paredes (CAN)	2
Bárbara – Fernanda (BRA)	0
2 August
Schwaiger – Schützenhöfer (AUT)	0
Betschart – Hüberli (SUI)	2
2 August
Gordon – Saxton (CAN)	0
Lehtonen – Lahti (FIN)	2
2 August
Glenzke – Großner (GER)	0
Laboureur – Sude (GER)	2

Round of 16
3 August
Larissa – Talita (BRA)	2
Heidrich – Vergé-Dépré (SUI)	0
3 August
Antonelli – Carol (BRA)	2
Maia – Lima (BRA)	0
3 August
Summer – Sweat (USA)	2
Kolocová – Kvapilová (CZE)	1
3 August
Hughes – Claes (USA)	0
Ludwig – Walkenhorst (GER)	2
3 August
Lidy – Leila (CUB)	1
Wilkerson – Bansley (CAN)	2
3 August
Ross – Fendrick (USA)	2
Hermannová – Sluková (CZE)	1
3 August
Pavan – Humana-Paredes (CAN)	2
Betschart – Hüberli (SUI)	0
3 August
Lehtonen – Lahti (FIN)	0
Laboureur – Sude (GER)	2

Quarter-finals
4 August
Larissa – Talita (BRA)	2
Antonelli – Carol (BRA)	0
4 August
Summer – Sweat (USA)	0
Ludwig – Walkenhorst (GER)	2
4 August
Wilkerson – Bansley (CAN)	0
Ross – Fendrick (USA)	2
4 August
Pavan – Humana-Paredes (CAN)	2
Laboureur – Sude (GER)	0

Semi-finals
4 August
Larissa – Talita (BRA)	0
Ludwig – Walkenhorst (GER)	2
4 August
Ross – Fendrick (USA)	2
Pavan – Humana-Paredes (CAN)	1

Final
5 August
Ludwig – Walkenhorst (GER)	2
Ross – Fendrick (USA)	1
3rd place match
5 August
Larissa – Talita (BRA)	2
Pavan – Humana-Paredes (CAN)	1

=== Round of 32 ===
Date	Time		Score		Set 1	Set 2	Set 3	Total	Report
2 Aug	12:30	Summer–Sweat (United States)	2–1	(China) Xue–Wang X.	16–21	21–12	15–10	52–43	Report
2 Aug	12:30	Flier–van Iersel (Netherlands)	0–2	(Czech Republic) Kolocová–Kvapilová	12–21	17–21		29–42	Report
2 Aug	13:30	Davidova–Shchypkova (Ukraine)	1–2	(Brazil) Maia–Lima	21–18	23–25	11–15	55–58	Report
2 Aug	13:30	Hughes–Claes (United States)	2–0	(Spain) Elsa–Amaranta	21–16	21–18		42–34	Report
2 Aug	13:30	Antonelli–Carol (Brazil)	2–1	(Australia) Bawden–Clancy	20–22	21–18	15–12	56–52	Report
2 Aug	14:30	Yue–Wang F. (China)	0–2	(Germany) Ludwig–Walkenhorst	19–21	14–21		33–42	Report
2 Aug	14:30	Glenzke–Großner (Germany)	0–2	(Germany) Laboureur–Sude	14–21	12–21		26–42	Report
2 Aug	14:30	Gordon–Saxton (Canada)	0–2	(Finland) Lehtonen–Lahti	14–21	15–21		29–42	Report
2 Aug	15:30	Meppelink–van Gestel (Netherlands)	0–2	(Cuba) Lidy–Leila	16–21	19–21		35–42	Report
2 Aug	15:30	Wilkerson–Bansley (Canada)	2–0	(Germany) Borger–Kozuch	21–16	21–19		42–35	Report
2 Aug	15:30	Pavan–Humana-Paredes (Canada)	2–0	(Brazil) Bárbara–Fernanda	21–16	21–10		42–26	Report
2 Aug	16:30	Larissa–Talita (Brazil)	2–0	(Argentina) Zonta–Gallay	21–12	21–14		42–26	Report
2 Aug	16:30	Mashkova–Samalikova (Kazakhstan)	0–2	(Switzerland) Heidrich–Vergé-Dépré	24–26	18–21		42–47	Report
2 Aug	16:30	Schwaiger–Schützenhöfer (Austria)	0–2	(Switzerland) Betschart–Hüberli	14–21	17–21		31–42	Report
2 Aug	17:30	Ross–Fendrick (United States)	2–1	(United States) Day–Branagh	10–21	21–18	15–11	46–50	Report
2 Aug	17:30	Ágatha–Duda (Brazil)	1–2	(Czech Republic) Hermannová–Sluková	16–21	21–19	14–16	51–56	Report

=== Round of 16 ===
Date	Time		Score		Set 1	Set 2	Set 3	Total	Report
3 Aug	11:30	Pavan–Humana-Paredes (Canada)	2–0	(Switzerland) Betschart–Hüberli	21–17	23–21		44–38	Report
3 Aug	11:30	Lehtonen–Lahti (Finland)	0–2	(Germany) Laboureur–Sude	17–21	19–21		36–42	Report
3 Aug	12:30	Lidy–Leila (Cuba)	1–2	(Canada) Wilkerson–Bansley	19–21	21–16	15–17	55–54	Report
3 Aug	12:30	Ross–Fendrick (United States)	2–1	(Czech Republic) Hermannová–Sluková	19–21	23–21	15–9	57–51	Report
3 Aug	14:30	Larissa–Talita (Brazil)	2–0	(Switzerland) Heidrich–Vergé-Dépré	21–19	21–16		42–35	Report
3 Aug	14:30	Antonelli–Carol (Brazil)	2–0	(Brazil) Maia–Lima	21–9	21–19		42–28	Report
3 Aug	16:30	Summer–Sweat (United States)	2–1	(Czech Republic) Kolocová–Kvapilová	17–21	22–20	15–12	54–53	Report
3 Aug	16:30	Hughes–Claes (United States)	0–2	(Germany) Ludwig–Walkenhorst	16–21	16–21		32–42	Report

=== Quarterfinals ===
Date	Time		Score		Set 1	Set 2	Set 3	Total	Report
4 Aug	12:00	Larissa–Talita (Brazil)	2–0	(Brazil) Antonelli–Carol	21–17	21–17		42–34	Report
4 Aug	12:00	Summer–Sweat (United States)	0–2	(Germany) Ludwig–Walkenhorst	15–21	14–21		29–42	Report
4 Aug	13:00	Wilkerson–Bansley (Canada)	0–2	(United States) Ross–Fendrick	16–21	10–21		26–42	Report
4 Aug	13:00	Pavan–Humana-Paredes (Canada)	2–0	(Germany) Laboureur–Sude	21–15	21–16		42–31	Report

=== Semifinals ===
Date	Time		Score		Set 1	Set 2	Set 3	Total	Report
4 Aug	17:30	Larissa–Talita (Brazil)	0–2	(Germany) Ludwig–Walkenhorst	19–21	16–21		35–42	Report
4 Aug	18:45	Ross–Fendrick (United States)	2–1	(Canada) Pavan–Humana-Paredes	19–21	21–16	15–11	55–48	Report

=== Third place match ===
Date	Time		Score		Set 1	Set 2	Set 3	Total	Report
5 Aug	13:15	Larissa–Talita (Brazil)	2–1	(Canada) Pavan–Humana-Paredes	21–12	16–21	18–16	55–49	Report

=== Final ===
Date	Time		Score		Set 1	Set 2	Set 3	Total	Report
5 Aug	14:30	Ludwig–Walkenhorst (Germany)	2–1	(United States) Ross–Fendrick	19–21	21–13	15–9	55–43	Report
