= Nina Brunner =

Swiss beach volleyball player (born 1995)

Nina Betschart
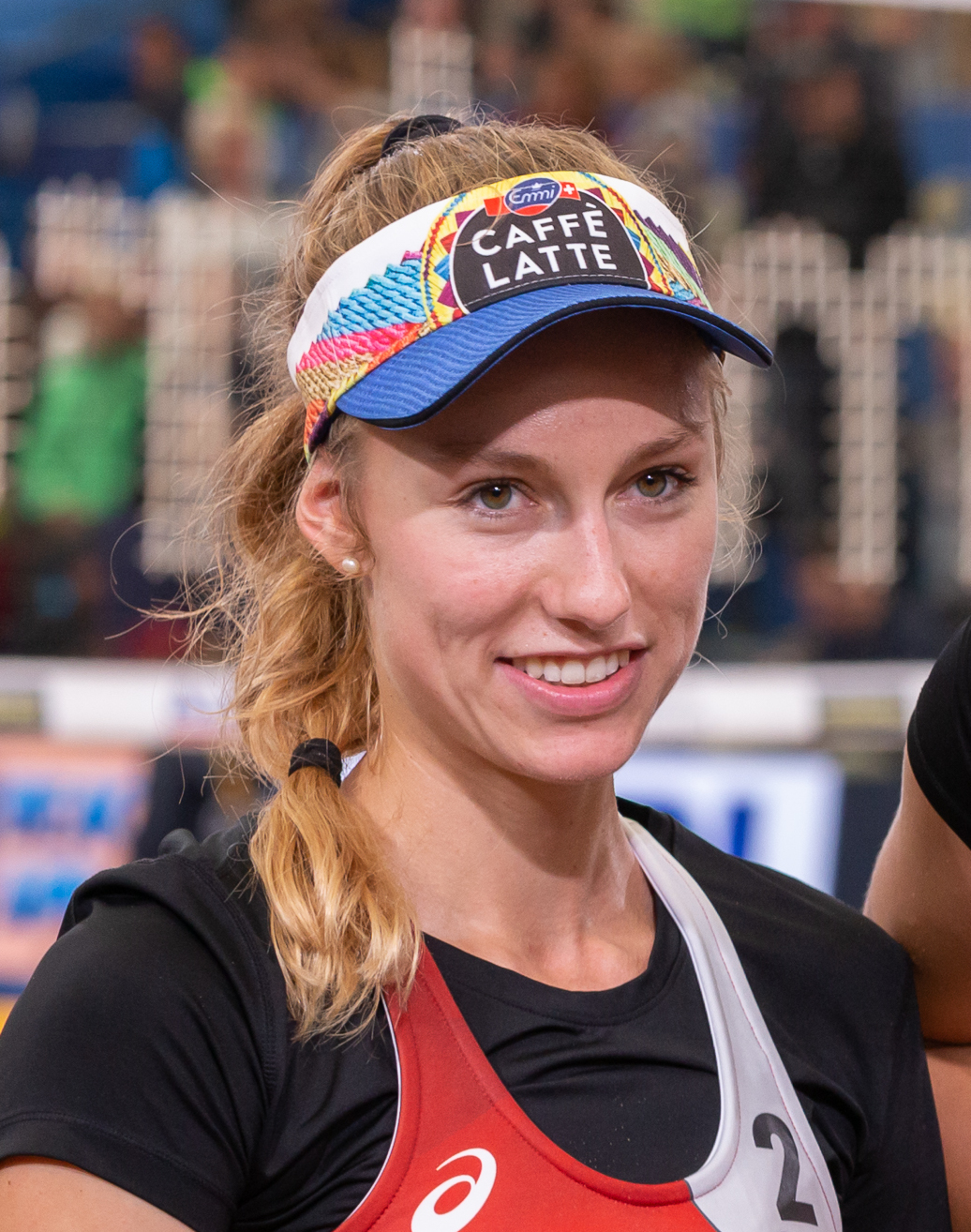
- Betschart in 2019

Personal information
- Full name: Nina Betschart
- Nationality: Swiss
- Born: 14 October 1995 (age 31) Baar, Switzerland
- Home town: Steinhausen, Switzerland
- Height: 1.75 m (5 ft 9 in)
- Weight: 65 kg (143 lb)
Beach volleyball information
Current teammate
- Years: Teammate
- 2016–2024, 2026: Tanja Hüberli
Previous teammates
- Years: Teammate
- 2008–2015 2011–2012 2012–2013: Nicole Eiholzer; Joana Heidrich (temporary); Anouk Vergé-Dépré (temporary)
Medal record
Women's beach volleyball
Representing Switzerland
Olympic Games
Bronze medal – third place	2024 Paris	Beach
European Championships
Gold medal – first place	2021 Vienna	Beach
Gold medal – first place	2023 Vienna	Beach
Silver medal – second place	2018 Netherlands	Beach
Silver medal – second place	2022 Munich	Beach
European Games
Gold medal – first place	2015 Baku	Beach
CEV Nations Cup
Gold medal – first place	2022 Vienna	Beach
U21 World Championships
Gold medal – first place	2011 Halifax	Beach
Gold medal – first place	2012 Halifax	Beach
U22 European Championships
Gold medal – first place	2013 Varna	Beach
Gold medal – first place	2015 Macedo de Cavaleiros	Beach
U20 European Championships
Gold medal – first place	2013 Vilnius	Beach
Gold medal – first place	2014 Cesenatico	Beach
U18 European Championships
Silver medal – second place	2011 Vilnius	Beach
Bronze medal – third place	2012 Brno	Beach

Nina Brunner (née Betschart; born 14 October 1995) is a Swiss professional beach volleyball player who plays as a right side defender with her partner Tanja Hüberli. She is a two-time European Champion, winning the title in 2021 and 2023, the silver medallist at the 2018 and 2022 European Championships, and the bronze medalist at the 2024 Summer Olympics. With her former partner Nicole Eiholzer, she won the gold medal at the first ever European Games in 2015. Alongside Hüberli, Betschart has won combined total of 3 gold, 4 silver and 6 bronze medals on FIVB World Tour and its successor Volleyball World Beach Pro Tour. Betschart / Hüberli team represented Switzerland at the 2020 Summer Olympics where they finished in ninth place and played a pivotal role at their country's triumph in the women's event of the inaugural CEV Beach Volleyball Nations Cup in 2022. They achieved a career-high World ranking of No. 2 in November 2021.

A six-time Swiss National Champion, Betschart has also enjoyed a lot of success in junior level, being twice an U21 World Champion and a four-time gold medallist in European Underage Championships, twice in U20 and twice in U22 level.

== Career ==
Betschart was born in Steinhausen, Switzerland. She began her career in indoor volleyball at VBC Steinhausen with her friend Nicole Eiholzer. Later, Betschart and Eiholzer formed a beach volleyball duo under the supervision of the coach Kurt Brunner, the first and only coach of the pair. From 2008 to 2013 they won the Swiss Junior Championships in every category they competed: U15 (2008, 2009), U18 (2010) and U21 (2011, 2012, 2013).

=== 2011 season: Youngest U21 World Champion ===
In 2011, along with Eiholzer, Betschart became fifth in the U19 World Championships in Umag. They reached the final at the U18 European Championships in Vilnius but lost to home favorite top-seeded Dumbauskaitė / Povilaityte in three sets (17–21, 22–20, 13–15) and settled for silver medal. For the U21 World Championships in Halifax, Betschart teamed up with Joana Heidrich after replacing Heidrich's original teammate Anouk Vergé-Dépré who was unable to play in the World Championships for health reasons, and they became the U21 World Champions after defeating Canada's top-seeded Altomare / Humana-Paredes in three sets. They were the first Swiss pair to claim the World Junior Championship title and at 15 years and 10 months, Betschart became the youngest player to win a gold medal in the history of FIVB U21 World Championships. After their international success, Betschart and Heidrich appeared on the cover of September 2011 issue of Swiss Volley magazine.

=== 2012 season: Back-to-back U21 World Championship gold ===
The following year Betschart / Eiholzer were third at the U18 European Championships in Brno. At the U19 World Championships in Larnaca and the U20 European Championships in Hartberg, they finished in fifth place. Betschart was again the U21 World Champion at Halifax, this time with Anouk Vergé-Dépré, after beating the Brazilian pair Drussyla Costa / Rebecca Silva in straight sets in the final. It was also a milestone in the career of Nina Betschart, she became the second woman after Brazil's Carolina Salgado to win gold in back-to-back years with different partners. Betschart / Eiholzer team made their first senior level tournament podium at Coop Beachtoor event in Locarno by finishing in second place. Alongside Heidrich, Betschart made her FIVB Beach Volleyball World Tour debut at the last stage of the 2012 World Tour in Bangsaen, Thailand after receiving a wild card by the FIVB. They finished the tournament in respectable ninth place.

=== 2013 season: U20 and U22 European double ===
In 2013 Betschart / Eiholzer won three Coop Beachtoor (Swiss National Beach Volleyball Tour) tournaments in Locarno, Geneva and Rorschach, respectively and finished fifth in the Swiss National Championships in Bern. The duo competed in both U21 and U19 World Championships and finished both competitions in fifth place. They won the U20 European Championships in Vilnius after defeating the second seed Baran / Gruszczynska of Poland in the final in straight sets. They have been clearly the dominant force of the championship and did not lose a single set throughout the tournament. This was the first international title that Betschart had won with her long-time partner, Eiholzer. A week later, Betschart became U22 European Champion in Varna, alongside Anouk Vergé-Dépré. Similar to U20 European Championships, Betschart and her partner won all their matches in championship in straight sets and clinched the title without dropping a single set. With the gold medals at U20 and U22 European Championships she became the second woman to win two European Junior Championship gold medals in the same year after Evgenia Ukolova who achieved the double at U20 and U23 European Championships back in 2008 (also with different partners).

=== 2014 season: Second consecutive U20 European title ===
In 2014, Betschart / Eiholzer successfully defended their U20 European Championship title in Cesenatico, Italy and thereby they became the first pair to win the U20 European crown for two consecutive years. They continued to compete well in Coop Beachtour, by winning the tournaments in Basel and Olten and reaching the final at Locarno. They moved up one place in the Swiss National Championships and finished fourth after losing the bronze medal game against the "Swiss Tanjas", Tanja Goricanec and Tanja Hüberli. Her first World Tour appearance with Eiholzer, came in 2014 Gstaad Grand Slam but the duo failed to qualify for main draw after finishing the qualification in 22nd place (only top-14 qualified). In U21 World Championships in Larnaca, they missed the podium after losing the bronze medal match against the American pair Sara Hughes / Kelly Claes in three sets and finished the championships in fourth place.

=== 2015 season: European Games Champion ===
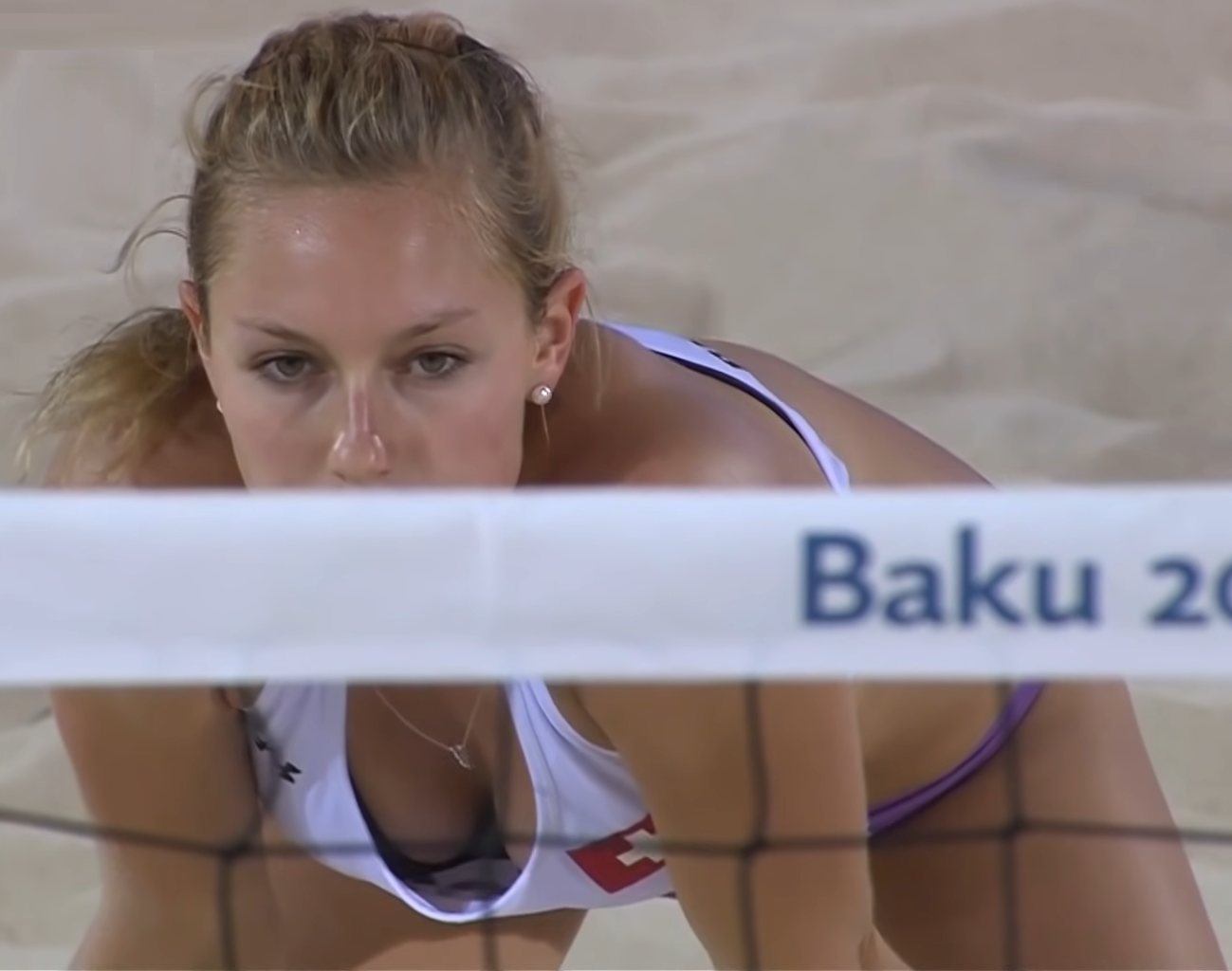
Betschart at the 2015 European Games

In 2015 season the duo began to appear in World Tour in more regular basis, their best result was the ninth-place finish in Prague Open. Their biggest international success came in the European Games in Baku. They won the gold medal after beating Austria's Schützenhofer / Plesiutschnig in the final in three sets (21–16, 14–21, 15–13). They were 8–11 down in the third set tie-breaker and had trailed for most of the set, but in the end they scored three points in a row – including an ace by Betschart – and crowned the first ever European Games champions in beach volleyball. After the match Betschart admitted that the victory was unlikely to come: "It is unbelievable. Didn't expect it. We were behind them all the time." Following the success at the European Games, the duo made their debut in European Championships in senior level in Klagenfurt, Austria but they struggled throughout the group phase and eliminated after losing all three group matches. They put the disappointment behind and made their first podium at continental level after finishing in third place at CEV Satellite tournament in Timișoara, Romania. Then, they went on to win gold medal at the U22 European Championships in Macedo de Cavaleiros, Portugal. They continued to their success at Coop Beachtour, with claiming two tournament wins in Geneva and Rorschach. At the 2015 Swiss National Championships, the duo again move up one place and won their first national championship medal with a third-place finish. At the end of the season Betschart and Eiholzer decided to end their eight-year long partnership.

=== 2016 season: First FIVB World Tour podium ===
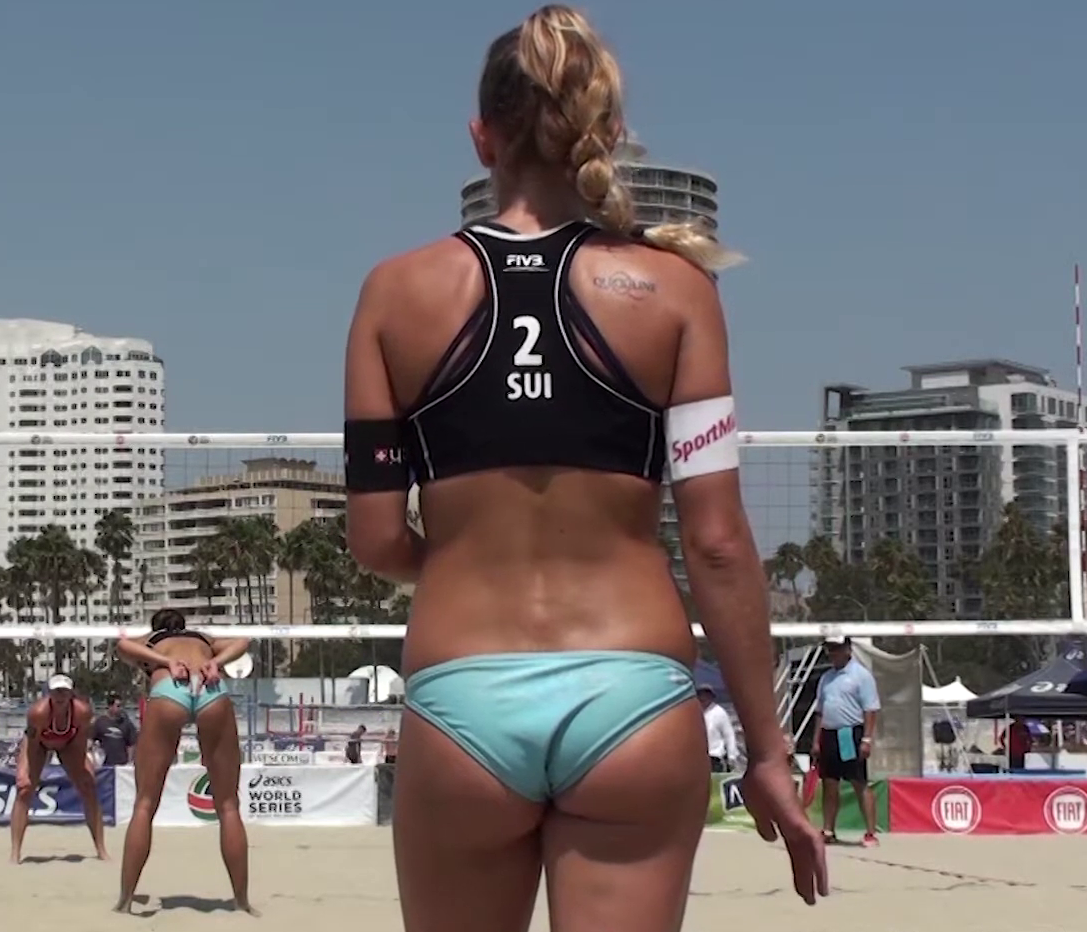
Betschart about to serve at the 2016 Long Beach Grand Slam

Following the split with Eiholzer, Betschart has teamed up with Tanja Hüberli, who was left partnerless upon the retirement of Tanja Goricanec. The pair has started to make their mark in World Tour with a fifth-place finish at Olsztyn Grand Slam. They pulled off an upset by defeating the reigning World Champions Ágatha / Bárbara of Brazil in the second round (21–19, 17–21, 18–16), before losing to the other Brazilian pair Duda / Elize Maia in the quarter-finals. They backed up that performance with another fifth-place finish at Poreč Major. They reached their first World Tour podium at A1 Major Klagenfurt where they finished in third place after defeating Argentina's Ana Gallay / Georgina Klug in three sets (14–21, 21–14, 22–20). At the home European Championships in Biel/Bienne they lost to eventual champions top-seeded Ludwig / Walkenhorst in the round of 16 and finished the championship in ninth place. Alongside Hüberli, Betschart won her first continental level tournament at CEV Satellite Baden in Austria. Since their success in the World Tour, they have started to compete in Coop Beachtour less frequently. Although they finished all tour events they competed in podium places; with her new partner, Betschart could not manage a tournament victory for the first time in four seasons. At the National Championships in Bern, she repeated last year's performance by finishing in bronze medal position.

=== 2017 season: Second FIVB World Tour podium and World Tour Finals debut ===
Betschart and Hüberli started the season in Swatch Major Series event in Fort Lauderdale in early February where they failed to qualify to the knock-out phase after losing all three group matches. In their very next tournament, a Coop Beach Tour event in Zürich, they reached first podium of the season with a third-place finish. They returned to the World Tour at a 4-Star tournament in Rio de Janeiro with a ninth-place finish after losing to the eventual champions Ágatha / Duda of Brazil in the round of 16 (16–21, 21–18, 12–15). After similar ninth-place results in World Tour at 3-star tournaments in Moscow and The Hague, the duo made their first international level podium in CEV Masters tournament in Baden. They edged out the Czech pair Kolocová / Kvapilová in very closely contested bronze medal match despite being forced to take a medical time-out when 10–12 down in the third set (21–18, 19–21, 16–14). In the 5-star Major Series tournament in Poreč, they won all of their matches until the semi-final match against Sluková / Hermannová whom they lost in three sets. They wasted couple of set points in the first set before losing it and despite dominating the second, they ran out of gas in the deciding set (20–22, 21–12, 10–15) and missed the chance to qualify for their first World Tour final. In the bronze medal match, they beat Barbara / Fernanda of Brazil and clinched their second ever medal in World Tour. After that performance they start to struggle in World Tour. They eliminated from Gstaad Major in second round and failed to meet the expectations of the home crowd. They skipped the lower-star World Tour events and participated only at the 4-star tournament in Olsztyn, where they also eliminated in second round, until the World Championships. At the World Championships in Vienna, they topped their group after winning all three group matches and beat the Austrian pair Schwaiger / Schützenhofer in the round of 32 before losing to Pavan / Humana-Paredes of Canada in the next round. Two weeks later they entered to the European Championships in Jurmala as the 4th seeded team, but suffered an unexpected defeat against Kolocová / Kvapilová in the round of 16 despite winning the first set and having a commanding 13–8 lead in the second (21–13, 18–21, 8–15). After the disappointment at European Championships, Betschart and Hüberli competed in Swatch World Tour Finals in Hamburg after receiving a wild card from FIVB, as one of the highest ranked teams not qualified for the event. Although they lost both two pool matches, they beat Kolocová / Kvapilová in the round of 12 and reached the quarter-finals in their World Tour Finals debut. At the end of the season, they competed at the National Championships where they finished in second-place after losing to Vergé-Dépré / Heidrich in the final in three sets (21–10, 17–21, 17–19).

== Personal life ==
On 12 November 2021, Betschart married her long time boyfriend Swiss national ice hockey player Damien Brunner, the son of her coach Kurt, and started to compete under her married name. She has a younger sister Mara who is also a beach volleyball player, and an older brother. Apart from beach volleyball, Betschart has also started a distance education in psychology with the aim of working with children in the future. She gave birth to a daughter in June 2025.

== Awards and honours ==
- CEV Beach Volleyball Team of the Year: 2022 (with Tanja Hüberli).
- Swiss Sports Team of the Year: 2024 (with Tanja Hüberli).
- Most Valuable Player of the Year by Swiss Volley (5): 2017, 2018, 2019, 2023 and 2024.
- Youngster of the Year by Swiss Volley: 2012.
- Most Valuable Player of the Swiss U21 National Championships (2): 2012 and 2013.
- Most Valuable Player of the Swiss U18 National Championships: 2010.
- Most Valuable Player of the Swiss U15 National Championships (2): 2008 and 2009.
- Sporthilfe Best Young Team of the Year (3): 2011, 2012 and 2013 (with Joana Heidrich, Anouk Vergé-Dépré and Nicole Eiholzer; respectively).
- Zug Sportswoman of the Year (3): 2013, 2015 and 2024.

== Career podiums ==
=== FIVB World Tour ===
- 13 medals – (3 gold, 4 silver, 6 bronze)

Legend
FIVB World Championships
FIVB World Tour Finals
5-Star Tournaments (Elite16 / Major)
4-Star Tournaments
3-Star Tournaments (Challenge)
2-Star Tournaments
1-Star Tournaments (Future)

No.	Result	Date	Category	Location	Partner	Opponents	Score		
1.	Bronze	30 Jul 2016	Swatch Major Series	Klagenfurt, Austria	Tanja Hüberli	(Argentina) Gallay / Klug	14–21	21–14	22–20
2.	Bronze	1 Jul 2017	Swatch Major Series	Poreč, Croatia	Tanja Hüberli	(Brazil) Barbara / Fernanda	21–19	21–14	
3.	Bronze	7 Jan 2018	FIVB 4-Star	The Hague, Netherlands	Tanja Hüberli	(Czech Republic) Hermannová / Sluková	21–18	21–10	
4.	Bronze	12 Aug 2018	FIVB 4-Star	Moscow, Russia	Tanja Hüberli	(Germany) Laboureur / Sude	21–19	21–12	
5.	Gold	23 Aug 2020	FIVB 1-Star	Baden, Austria	Tanja Hüberli	(Switzerland) Vergé-Dépré / Heidrich	21–15	3–1 (r)	
6.	Silver	29 May 2021	FIVB 4-Star	Sochi, Russia	Tanja Hüberli	(United States) Claes / Sponcil	18–21	16–21	
7.	Bronze	8 May 2022	Challenge	Doha, Qatar	Tanja Hüberli	(Australia) Artacho / Clancy	13–21	21–19	15–11
8.	Bronze	29 May 2022	Elite 16	Ostrava, Czech Republic	Tanja Hüberli	(Switzerland) Vergé-Dépré / Heidrich	21–16	21–18	
9.	Silver	13 Aug 2022	Elite 16	Hamburg, Germany	Tanja Hüberli	(United States) Cheng / Flint	19–21	18–21	
10.	Silver	5 Feb 2023	Elite 16	Doha, Qatar	Tanja Hüberli	(Netherlands) Stam / Schoon	22–20	14–21	11–15
11.	Gold	21 Apr 2024	Elite 16	Tepic, Mexico	Tanja Hüberli	(Netherlands) Stam / Schoon	21–14	19–21	19–17
12.	Silver	26 May 2024	Elite 16	Espinho, Portugal	Tanja Hüberli	(United States) Kloth / Nuss	21–17	26–28	10–15
13.	Gold	25 Aug 2024	Elite 16	Hamburg, Germany	Tanja Hüberli	(Germany) Müller / Tillmann	21–18	18–21	18–16

=== CEV European Tour ===
- 9 medals – (4 gold, 2 silver, 3 bronze)

Legend
CEV European Championships
CEV Masters
CEV Challenger & Satellite

No.	Result	Date	Category	Location	Partner	Opponents	Score		
1.	Gold	20 Jun 2015	European Games	Baku, Azerbaijan	Nicole Eiholzer	(Austria) Schützenhofer / Plesiutschnig	21–16	14–21	15–13
2.	Bronze	16 Aug 2015	CEV Satellite	Timișoara, Romania	Nicole Eiholzer	(Russia) Motrich / Makroguzova	Walkover		
3.	Gold	11 Jun 2016	CEV Satellite	Baden, Austria	Tanja Hüberli	(Netherlands) Sinnema / Braakman	21–16	21–16	
4.	Bronze	23 Jul 2016	CEV Satellite	Vaduz, Liechtenstein	Tanja Hüberli	(Germany) Arnholdt / Schumacher	21–9	21–17	
5.	Bronze	24 Jun 2017	CEV Masters	Baden, Austria	Tanja Hüberli	(Czech Republic) Kolocová / Kvapilová	21–18	19–21	16–14
6.	Silver	21 Jul 2018	European Championships	The Hague, Netherlands	Tanja Hüberli	(Netherlands) Keizer / Meppelink	16–21	24–26	
7.	Gold	14 Aug 2021	European Championships	Vienna, Austria	Tanja Hüberli	(Netherlands) Stam / Schoon	21–15	21–12	
8.	Silver	20 Aug 2022	European Championships	(Germany) Munich, Netherlands	Tanja Hüberli	(Latvia) Graudiņa / Kravčenoka	21–18	15–21	11–15
9.	Gold	5 Aug 2023	European Championships	Vienna, Austria	Tanja Hüberli	(Spain) Moreno / Álvarez	21–12	21–13	

=== Swiss Beach Tour ===
- 25 medals – (14 gold, 6 silver, 5 bronze)

Legend
Swiss National Championships
Coop Beachtour A1

No.	Result	Date	Category	Location	Partner	Opponents	Score		
1.	Silver	28 May 2012	Coop Beachtour A1	Locarno, Switzerland	Nicole Eiholzer	(Switzerland) Heidrich / Kayser	18–21	18–21	
2.	Gold	20 May 2013	Coop Beachtour A1	Locarno, Switzerland	Nicole Eiholzer	(Switzerland) Kayser / Grässli	22–20	22–20	
3.	Gold	7 Jul 2013	Coop Beachtour A1	Geneva, Switzerland	Nicole Eiholzer	(Switzerland) Goricanec / Hüberli	19–21	21–15	15–9
4.	Gold	25 Aug 2013	Coop Beachtour A1	Rorschach, Switzerland	Nicole Eiholzer	(Brazil) Moreira / Bieli Jorge	21–16	21–19	
5.	Gold	6 May 2014	Coop Beachtour A1	Basel, Switzerland	Nicole Eiholzer	(Switzerland) Goricanec / Hüberli	22–20	21–17	
6.	Silver	9 Jun 2014	Coop Beachtour A1	Locarno, Switzerland	Nicole Eiholzer	(Germany) Köhler / Schumacher	17–21	14–21	
7.	Gold	22 Jun 2014	Coop Beachtour A1	Olten, Switzerland	Nicole Eiholzer	(Switzerland) Kayser / Grässli	24–22	21–15	
8.	Bronze	24 Aug 2014	Coop Beachtour A1	Rorschach, Switzerland	Sarah Leeman	(Switzerland) Sciarini / Guerra-Schmocker	21–12	21–13	
9.	Bronze	7 Jun 2015	Coop Beachtour A1	Olten, Switzerland	Nicole Eiholzer	(Switzerland) Grässli / Sciarini	21–18	21–19	
10.	Gold	28 Jun 2015	Coop Beachtour A1	Geneva, Switzerland	Nicole Eiholzer	(Switzerland) Grässli / Sciarini	19–21	21–19	15–9
11.	Gold	23 Aug 2015	Coop Beachtour A1	Rorschach, Switzerland	Nicole Eiholzer	(Germany) Schumacher / Seyfferth	12–21	21–12	15–12
12.	Bronze	4 Sep 2015	National Championships	Bern, Switzerland	Nicole Eiholzer	(Switzerland) Betz / Seghers	21–15	21–17	
13.	Silver	9 Apr 2016	Coop Beachtour A1	Zürich, Switzerland	Tanja Hüberli	(Switzerland) Heidrich / Zumkehr	14–21	15–21	
14.	Silver	29 May 2016	Coop Beachtour A1	Olten, Switzerland	Tanja Hüberli	(Switzerland) Grässli / Sciarini	21–19	19–21	10–15
15.	Bronze	2 Sep 2016	National Championships	Bern, Switzerland	Tanja Hüberli	(Switzerland) Grässli / Sciarini	21–16	21–15	
16.	Bronze	9 Apr 2017	Coop Beachtour A1	Zürich, Switzerland	Tanja Hüberli	(Switzerland) Caluori / Steinemann	21–17	21–19	
17.	Silver	1 Sep 2017	National Championships	Bern, Switzerland	Tanja Hüberli	(Switzerland) Vergé-Dépré / Heidrich	21–10	17–21	17–19
18.	Silver	8 Apr 2018	Coop Beachtour A1	Zürich, Switzerland	Tanja Hüberli	(Switzerland) Vergé-Dépré / Heidrich	10–21	15–21	
19	Gold	3 Jun 2018	Coop Beachtour A1	Olten, Switzerland	Tanja Hüberli	(Germany) Bieneck / Schneider	22–20	21–15	
20.	Gold	7 Sep 2018	National Championships	Bern, Switzerland	Tanja Hüberli	(Switzerland) Böbner / Vergé-Dépré	21–17	21–17	
21.	Gold	30 Aug 2019	National Championships	Bern, Switzerland	Tanja Hüberli	(Switzerland) Vergé-Dépré / Heidrich	21–16	12–21	15–9
22.	Gold	3 Sep 2021	National Championships	Bern, Switzerland	Tanja Hüberli	(Switzerland) Vergé-Dépré / Caluori	21–14	21–9	
23.	Gold	2 Sep 2022	National Championships	Bern, Switzerland	Tanja Hüberli	(Switzerland) Böbner / Vergé-Dépré	26–24	21–17	
24.	Gold	1 Sep 2023	National Championships	Bern, Switzerland	Tanja Hüberli	(Switzerland) Böbner / Vergé-Dépré	21–12	21–17	
25.	Gold	30 Aug 2024	National Championships	Bern, Switzerland	Tanja Hüberli	(Switzerland) Böbner / Vergé-Dépré	21–17	21–17	

=== International Junior/Youth Championships ===
- 8 medals – (6 gold, 1 silver, 1 bronze)

Legend
FIVB U21 World Championships
FIVB U19 World Championships
CEV U22 European Championships
CEV U20 European Championships
CEV U18 European Championships

No.	Result	Date	Category	Location	Partner	Opponents	Score		
1.	Silver	14 Aug 2011	U18 European Champs.	Vilnius, Lithuania	Nicole Eiholzer	(Lithuania) Dumbauskaitė / Povilaitytė	17–21	22–20	13–15
2.	Gold	4 Sep 2011	U21 World Champs.	Halifax, Canada	Joana Heidrich	(Canada) Altomare / Humana-Paredes	21–16	14–21	15–11
3.	Bronze	8 Jul 2012	U18 European Champs.	Brno, Czech Republic	Nicole Eiholzer	(Czech Republic) Tresnakova / Filatova	21–13	23–21	
4.	Gold	2 Sep 2012	U21 World Champs.	Halifax, Canada	Anouk Vergé-Dépré	(Brazil) Costa / Silva	21–16	21–17	
5.	Gold	11 Aug 2013	U20 European Champs.	Vilnius, Lithuania	Nicole Eiholzer	(Poland) Baran / Gruszczynska	21–9	21–18	
6.	Gold	18 Aug 2013	U22 European Champs.	Varna, Bulgaria	Anouk Vergé-Dépré	(Spain) Lobato / Soria	21–17	21–15	
7.	Gold	7 Sep 2014	U20 European Champs.	Cesenatico, Italy	Nicole Eiholzer	(Austria) Strauss / Strauss	21–16	21–13	
8.	Gold	30 Aug 2015	U22 European Champs.	Macedo de Cavaleiros, Portugal	Nicole Eiholzer	(Poland) Kociołek / Strag	18–21	27–25	15–12
