= 2017 in volleyball =

The following were the events of Volleyball for the year 2017 throughout the world.

== Beach volleyball ==
=== World and continental beach volleyball events ===
- June 15 – 18: 2017 European U22 Beach Volleyball Championships in (Austria) Baden bei Wien
  - Winners: Russia (Oleg Stoyanovskiy & Artem Yarzutkin) (m) / Russia (Svetlana Kholomina & Nadezda Makroguzova) (f)
- July 11 – 16: 2017 FIVB Beach Volleyball U21 World Championships in (China) Nanjing
  - Winners: Brazil (Adrielson dos Santos Silva & Renato Andrew Lima de Carvalho) (m) / Brazil (Eduarda Santos Lisboa & Ana Patricia Silva Ramos) (f)
- July 28 – August 6: 2017 Beach Volleyball World Championships in (Austria) Vienna
  - Winners: Brazil (André Stein & Evandro Oliveira) (m) / Germany (Laura Ludwig & Kira Walkenhorst) (f)
- August 16 – 20: 2017 European Beach Volleyball Championships in (Latvia) Jūrmala
  - Winners: Italy (Daniele Lupo & Paolo Nicolai) (m) / Germany (Nadja Glenzke & Julia Großner) (f)
- August 22 – 27: 2017 Swatch Beach Volleyball FIVB World Tour Finals in Hamburg
  - Winners: United States (Phil Dalhausser & Nick Lucena) (m) / Germany (Laura Ludwig & Kira Walkenhorst) (f)
- August 24 – 27: 2017 European U18 Beach Volleyball Championships in Kazan
  - Winners: Russia (Pavel Shustrov & Alexey Gusev) (m) / Russia (Maria Voronina & Mariia Bocharova) (f)
- September 7 – 10: 2017 European U20 Beach Volleyball Championships in (Italy) Vulcano
  - Winners: Russia (Vasilii Ivanov & Sergey Gorbenko) (m) / Russia (Maria Voronina & Mariia Bocharova) (f)

=== FIVB Beach Volleyball World Tour ===
- February 7 – October 23: 2017 FIVB Beach Volleyball World Tour

==== 2017 Swatch Major Series (Five Star BV events) ====
- February 7 – 12: Major #1 in (United States) Fort Lauderdale, Florida
  - Winners: Brazil (Saymon Barbosa Santos & Álvaro Morais Filho) (m) / Brazil (Larissa França & Talita Antunes) (f)
- June 27 – July 2: Major #2 in (Croatia) Poreč
  - Winners: Brazil (Gustavo Albrecht Carvalhaes & Pedro Solberg Salgado) (m) / Canada (Sarah Pavan & Melissa Humana-Paredes) (f)
- July 4 – 9: Major #3 (final) in (Switzerland) Gstaad
  - Winners: United States (Phil Dalhausser & Nick Lucena) (m) / Germany (Julia Sude & Chantal Laboureur) (f)

==== 2017 Four Star BV events ====
- May 18 – 21: Four Star #1 in Rio de Janeiro
  - Winners: Brazil (Alison Cerutti & Bruno Oscar Schmidt) (m) / Brazil (Ágatha Bednarczuk & Eduarda Santos Lisboa) (f)
- May 23 – 28: Four Star #2 in (Switzerland) Lucerne
  - Event cancelled, due to financial issues.
- July 19 – 23: Four Star #3 (final) in (Poland) Olsztyn
  - Winners: Germany (Markus Böckermann & Lars Flüggen) (m) / Brazil (Larissa França & Talita Antunes) (f)

==== 2017 Three Star BV events ====
- February 15 – 18: Three Star #1 in (Iran) Kish Island (men only)
  - Winners: Russia (Nikita Lyamin & Viacheslav Krasilnikov)
- April 19 – 23: Three Star #2 in (China) Xiamen
  - Winners: Netherlands (Alexander Brouwer & Robert Meeuwsen) (m) / Brazil (Bárbara Seixas & Fernanda Alves) (f)
- May 31 – June 4: Three Star #3 in (Russia) Moscow
  - Winners: United States (Phil Dalhausser & Nick Lucena) (m) / Brazil (Larissa França & Talita Antunes) (f)
- June 15 – 18: Three Star #4 in (Netherlands) The Hague
  - Winners: Russia (Nikita Lyamin & Viacheslav Krasilnikov) (m) / Brazil (Carolina Solberg Salgado & Maria Elisa Antonelli) (f)
- October 11 – 15: Three Star #5 (final) in (China) Qinzhou
  - Winners: Russia (Maxim Sivolap & Igor Velichko) (m) / Australia (Mariafe Artacho & Taliqua Clancy) (f)

==== 2017 Two Star BV events ====
- March 17 – 19: Two Star #1 in (Australia) Sydney #1 (women only)
  - Winners: Canada (Julie Gordon & Camille Saxton)
- June 16 – 18: Two Star #2 in (China) Nanjing (women only)
  - Winners: United States (Kelley Larsen & Betsi Flint)
- June 23 – 25: Two Star #3 in Nantong (women only)
  - Winners: China (Wen Shuhui & Xia Xinyi)
- July 28 – 30: Two Star #4 in Espinho, Portugal (men only)
  - Winners: Brazil (George Souto Maior Wanderley & Vitor Gonçalves Felipe)
- November 22 – 26: Two Star #5 (final) in Sydney #2
  - Winners: Canada (Ben Saxton & Grant O'Gorman) (m) / Australia (Mariafe Artacho del Solar & Taliqua Clancy) (f)

==== 2017 One Star BV events ====
- March 4 & 5: One Star #1 in Shepparton
  - Winners: Australia (Christopher McHugh & Damien Schumann) (m) / Canada (Julie Gordon & Camille Saxton) (f)
- April 15 & 16: One Star #2 in (Malaysia) Langkawi
  - Winners: Cuba (Diaz Gomez Nivaldo Nadir & Sergio González) (m) / United States (Emily Stockman & Kimberly Dicello) (f)
- June 17 & 18: One Star #3 in Monaco (women only)
  - Winners: Brazil (Juliana Silva & Carolina Horta Maximo)
- June 23 & 24: One Star #4 in Pacific Harbour
  - Note 1: This event was postponed from the January 12 – 14 dates, following heavy rainfall and flooding in Fiji.
  - Note 2: This event was officially cancelled, due to financial difficulties.
- July 14 – 16: One Star #5 in (South Korea) Daegu (women only)
  - Winners: Japan (Miki Ishii & Megumi Murakami)
- July 20 – 22: One Star #6 in (South Korea) Ulsan (women only)
  - Winners: United States (Betsi Flint & Kelley Larsen)
- July 21 – 23: One Star #7 in (Morocco) Agadir
  - Winners: France (Youssef Krou & Quincy Aye) (m) / Switzerland (Nicole Eiholzer & Dunja Gerson) (f)
- September 7 – 9: One Star #8 in (France) Montpellier (men only)
  - Winners: Slovenia (Jan Pokeršnik & Nejc Zemljak)
- October 25 – 29: One Star #9 (final) in Aalsmeer
  - Winners: Italy (Enrico Rossi & Marco Caminati) (m) / Netherlands (Joy Stubbe & Madelein Meppelink) (f)

== Indoor Volleyball ==
=== National team competitions ===
World Championships / Cups
Date	Host nation (City)	Tournament	Champions	Runner-up	Bronze medalists	Result (Matches played)
May 8 – 14	Japan (Kobe)	2017 FIVB Volleyball Women's Club World Championship	(Turkey) Vakıfbank Istanbul (2nd title)	(Brazil) Rexona-Sesc Rio	(Switzerland) Voléro Zürich	3–0
June 23 – July 2	Czech Republic (Brno & České Budějovice)	2017 FIVB Volleyball Men's U21 World Championship	Poland (3rd title)	Cuba	Russia	3–0
July 14 – 23	Mexico (Boca del Río & Córdoba)	2017 FIVB Volleyball Women's U20 World Championship	China (3rd title)	Russia	Japan	3–0
August 18 – 25	Egypt (Cairo)	2017 FIVB Volleyball Men's U23 World Championship	Argentina (1st title)	Russia	Cuba	4–2
August 18 – 27	Argentina (Rosario, Santa Fe)	2017 FIVB Volleyball Girls' U18 World Championship	Italy (2nd title)	Dominican Republic	Russia	3–1
August 18 – 27	Bahrain (Riffa & Isa Town)	2017 FIVB Volleyball Boys' U19 World Championship	Iran (2nd title)	Russia	Japan	3–1
September 5 – 10	Japan (Tokyo & Nagoya)	2017 FIVB Volleyball Women's World Grand Champions Cup	China (2nd title)	Brazil	United States	5–0 record
September 10 – 17	Slovenia (Ljubljana)	2017 FIVB Volleyball Women's U23 World Championship	Turkey (1st title)	Slovenia	Bulgaria	4–0
September 12 – 17	Japan (Nagoya & Osaka)	2017 FIVB Volleyball Men's World Grand Champions Cup	Brazil (5th title)	Italy	Iran	4–1 (Sets Ratio: 2.800) (Points Ratio: 1.135)
December 11 – 17	Poland (Opole, Łódź, & Kraków)	2017 FIVB Volleyball Men's Club World Championship	(Russia) Zenit-Kazan (1st title)	(Italy) Cucine Lube Civitanova	(Brazil) Sada Cruzeiro	3–0

=== 2017 FIVB Volleyball World League ===
- June 17 & 18: Group 3 Finals in (Mexico) León
  - Estonia defeated Spain, 3–0 in matches played, in the final. Germany took third place.
- June 24 & 25: Group 2 Finals in Gold Coast
  - Slovenia defeated Japan, 3–0 in matches played, in the final. Australia took third place.
- July 4 – 8: Group 1 Finals in Curitiba
  - France defeated Brazil, 3–2 in matches played, in the final. Canada took third place.

=== 2017 FIVB Volleyball World Grand Prix ===
- July 22 & 23: Group 3 Finals in Canberra
  - Hungary defeated Australia, 3–0 in matches played, in the final. France took third place.
- July 29 & 30: Group 2 Finals in (Czech Republic) Ostrava
  - Poland defeated South Korea, 3–0 in matches played, in the final. Germany took third place.
- August 2 – 6: Group 1 Finals in (China) Nanjing
  - Brazil defeated Italy, 3–2 in matches played, in the final. Serbia took third place.

=== CEV ===
- October 18, 2016 – April 23, 2017: 2016–17 CEV Women's Champions League
  - (Turkey) Vakıfbank Istanbul defeated (Italy) Imoco Volley Conegliano, 3–0 in matches played, to win their third CEV Women's Champions League title.
  - (Turkey) Eczacıbaşı VitrA Istanbul took third place.
  - Note: Both Vakibank and Imoco Volley have qualified to compete at the 2017 FIVB Volleyball Women's Club World Championship event.
- November 2, 2016 – April 30, 2017: 2016–17 CEV Champions League
  - (Russia) VC Zenit-Kazan defeated (Italy) Sir Sicoma Colussi Perugia, 3–0 in matches played, to win their third consecutive and fifth overall CEV Champions League title.
  - (Italy) Cucine Lube Civitanova took third place.
- November 8, 2016 – April 16, 2017: 2016–17 CEV Challenge Cup
  - (Russia) Fakel Novy Urengoy defeated (France) Chaumont Volleyball 52, 6–2 in matches played, to win their first CEV Challenge Cup title.
- December 6, 2016 – April 15, 2017: 2016–17 Men's CEV Cup
  - (France) Tours VB defeated (Italy) Diatec Trentino, 15–13 in the golden set, to win their first Men's CEV Cup title.
- December 13, 2016 – April 15, 2017: 2016–17 Women's CEV Cup
  - (Russia) Dynamo Kazan defeated (Italy) Futura Volley Busto Arsizio, 6–3 in matches played, to win their first Women's CEV Cup title.
- December 13, 2016 – April 15, 2017: 2016–17 CEV Women's Challenge Cup
  - (Turkey) Bursa BBSK defeated (Greece) Olympiacos Piraeus, 5–3 in matches played, to win their second CEV Women's Challenge Cup title.
- April 1 – 9: 2017 Girls' U18 Volleyball European Championship in (Netherlands) Arnhem
  - Russia defeated Italy, 3–2 in matches played, to win their second consecutive and third overall Girls' U18 Volleyball European Championship title.
  - Belarus took third place.
  - Note: Along with the three national teams mentioned above, Serbia, Slovenia, and Germany all qualified to compete in the 2017 FIVB Volleyball Girls' U18 World Championship.
- April 22 – 30: 2017 Boys' U19 Volleyball European Championship in (Hungary) Győr and (Slovakia) Púchov
  - The Czech Republic defeated Italy, 3–2 in matches played, to win their first Boys' U19 Volleyball European Championship title.
  - Turkey took third place.
  - Note: Along the three teams mentioned here, Russia, Poland, and France all qualified to compete at the 2017 FIVB Volleyball Boys' U19 World Championship.
- August 24 – September 3: 2017 Men's European Volleyball Championship in Poland
  - Russia defeated Germany, 3–2 in matches played, to win their 14th Men's European Volleyball Championship title.
  - Serbia took third place.
- September 20 – October 1: 2017 Women's European Volleyball Championship in (Azerbaijan) Baku / Quba and (Georgia (country)) Tbilisi
  - Serbia defeated the Netherlands, 3–1 in matches played, to win their second Women's European Volleyball Championship title.
  - Turkey took third place.

=== AVC ===
Asia Championships
Date	Host nation (City)	Tournament	Champions	Runners-up	Bronze medalists	Results (Matches played)
March 5–13	China (Chongqing)	2017 Asian Girls' U18 Volleyball Championship (Note: Along with the medalists, Thailand also qualified to compete at the 2017 FIVB Volleyball Girls' U18 World Championship.)	Japan (7th title)	China	South Korea	3–0
March 28–April 5	Myanmar (Naypyidaw)	2017 Asian Boys' U19 Volleyball Championship (Note: Along with the medalists, Iran also qualified to compete at the 2017 FIVB Volleyball Boys' U19 World Championship.)	Japan (1st title)	South Korea	China	3–0
May 1–9	Iran (Ardabil)	2017 Asian Men's U23 Volleyball Championship (Note: Iran and Japan, as finalists, qualified to compete at the 2017 FIVB Volleyball Men's U23 World Championship.)	Iran (2nd title)	Japan	Chinese Taipei	3–0
May 13–21	Thailand (Nakhon Ratchasima)	2017 Asian Women's U23 Volleyball Championship (Note: Japan and Thailand, as finalists, qualified to compete at the 2017 FIVB Volleyball Women's U23 World Championship.)	Japan (1st title)	Thailand	Vietnam	3–2
May 23–31	Kazakhstan (Ust-Kamenogorsk)	2017 Asian Women's Club Volleyball Championship (Note: Supreme Chonburi has qualified to compete at the 2018 FIVB Volleyball Women's Club World Championship.)	(Thailand) Supreme Chonburi (1st title)	(Japan) Hisamitsu Springs	(China) Tianjin Bohai Bank	3–1
June 28–July 6	Vietnam (Ninh Bình & Nam Định)	2017 Asian Men's Club Volleyball Championship (Note: Sarmayeh Bank Tehran has qualified to compete at the 2018 FIVB Volleyball Men's Club World Championship.)	(Iran) Sarmayeh Bank Tehran (2nd title)	(Japan) Toyoda Gosei Trefuerza	(Qatar) Al Arabi	3–0
July 24–August 1	Indonesia (Surabaya)	2017 Asian Men's Volleyball Championship (Note: The top 8 teams all qualified to compete at the 2018 AVC Cup for Men.)	Japan (9th title)	Kazakhstan	South Korea	3–1
August 9–17	Philippines (Biñan and Muntinlupa)	2017 Asian Women's Volleyball Championship (Note: The top 8 teams all qualified to compete at the 2018 AVC Cup for Women.)	Japan (4th title)	Thailand	South Korea	3–2

=== NORCECA ===
- September 26 – October 1: 2017 Men's NORCECA Volleyball Championship in Colorado Springs, Colorado
  - The United States defeated the Dominican Republic, 3–0 in matches played, to win their ninth Men's NORCECA Volleyball Championship title.
  - Canada took third place.
  - Note: All teams mentioned above have qualified to compete at the 2018 FIVB Volleyball Men's World Championship.
- September 26 – October 1: 2017 Women's NORCECA Volleyball Championship (Group B) in Langley, British Columbia
  - Champions: Canada; Second: Cuba; Third: Nicaragua; Fourth: Saint Lucia
  - Note: Canada and Cuba have qualified to compete at the 2018 FIVB Volleyball Women's World Championship.
- October 11 – 16: 2017 Women's NORCECA Volleyball Championship (Group A) in Santo Domingo
  - Champions: Dominican Republic; Second: Puerto Rico; Third: Guatemala; Fourth: Jamaica
  - Note: The Dominican Republic and Puerto Rico have qualified to compete at the 2018 FIVB Volleyball Women's World Championship.
- October 11 – 16: 2017 Women's NORCECA Volleyball Championship (Group C) in Trinidad and Tobago
  - Champions: Mexico; Second: Trinidad and Tobago; Third: Costa Rica; Fourth: Dominica
  - Note: Mexico and Trinidad & Tobago have qualified to compete at the 2018 FIVB Volleyball Women's World Championship.

=== CSV ===
- February 12 – 19: 2017 Women's South American Volleyball Club Championship in (Brazil) Uberlândia
  - (Brazil) Rexona Sesc defeated fellow Brazilian team, Dentil/Praia Clube, 3–1 in matches played, to win their third consecutive and fourth overall Women's South American Volleyball Club Championship title.
  - (Peru) Universidad San Martín took third place.
  - Note: Rexona Sesc has qualified to compete at the 2017 FIVB Volleyball Women's Club World Championship.
- February 19 – 26: 2017 Men's South American Volleyball Club Championship in (Brazil) Montes Claros
  - (Brazil) Sada Cruzeiro defeated (Argentina) Personal Bolívar, 3–0 in matches played, to win their second consecutive and fourth overall Men's South American Volleyball Club Championship title.
  - (Argentina) UPCN San Juan took third place.
  - Note: Sada Cruzeiro has qualified to compete at the 2017 FIVB Volleyball Men's Club World Championship.
- August 5 – 12: 2017 Men's South American Volleyball Championship in (Chile) Santiago
  - Brazil defeated Venezuela, 3–0 in matches played, to win their 31st Men's South American Volleyball Championship title.
  - Argentina took third place.
  - Note: Brazil has qualified to compete at the 2018 FIVB Volleyball Men's World Championship.
- August 15 – 19: 2017 Women's South American Volleyball Championship in Cali
  - Champions: Brazil; Second: Colombia; Third: Peru
  - Note: Brazil has qualified to compete at the 2018 FIVB Volleyball Women's World Championship.
- October 11 – 15: 2017 Girls' U16 South American Volleyball Championship in (Paraguay) Asunción
  - Argentina defeated Peru, 3–1 in matches played, to win their first Girls' U16 South American Volleyball Championship title.
  - Chile took third place.

=== NORCECA and CSV ===
- March 18 – 26: 2017 Boys' Youth Pan-American Volleyball Cup in Monterrey
  - Mexico defeated Chile, 3–0 in matches played, to win their first Boys' Youth Pan-American Volleyball Cup title.
  - Puerto Rico took third place.
  - Note: All three teams mentioned above have qualified to compete at the 2017 FIVB Volleyball Boys' U19 World Championship.
- March 26 – April 3: 2017 Girls' Youth Pan-American Volleyball Cup in Havana
  - Colombia defeated Cuba, 3–0 in matches played, to win their first Girls' Youth Pan-American Volleyball Cup title.
  - The Dominican Republic took third place.
  - Note: Along with Colombia and Cuba, Mexico have qualified to compete at the 2017 FIVB Volleyball Girls' U18 World Championship.
- May 6 – 14: 2017 Women's Junior Pan-American Volleyball Cup in San José, Costa Rica
  - The United States defeated Argentina, 3–0 in matches played, to win their first Women's Junior Pan-American Volleyball Cup title.
  - Cuba took third place.
  - Note: Both the United States and Argentina have qualified to compete at the 2017 FIVB Volleyball Women's U20 World Championship.
- May 14 – 22: 2017 Men's Junior Pan-American Volleyball Cup in Fort McMurray
  - Brazil defeated Cuba, 3–1 in matches played, to win their second consecutive Men's Junior Pan-American Volleyball Cup title.
  - Canada took third place.
- June 15 – 26: 2017 Women's Pan-American Volleyball Cup in (Peru) Lima & Cañete
  - The United States defeated the Dominican Republic, 3–1 in matches played, to win their fifth Women's Pan-American Volleyball Cup title.
  - Puerto Rico took third place.
- July 23 – 31: 2017 Men's Pan-American Volleyball Cup in (Canada) Gatineau
  - Argentina defeated Puerto Rico, 3–1 in matches played, to win their first Men's Pan-American Volleyball Cup title.
  - Cuba took third place.

=== CAVB ===
- March 17 – 27: 2017 African Clubs Championship in (Tunisia) Tunis
  - (Egypt) Al Ahly defeated (Tunisia) Étoile du Sahel, 3–1 in matches played, to win their 12th African Clubs Championship title.
  - (Algeria) Bourj Bouaririj took third place.
- April 6 – 16: 2017 Women's African Clubs Championship in Monastir, Tunisia
  - (Tunisia) Carthage defeated (Egypt) Shams, 3–2 in matches played, to win their first Women's African Clubs Championship title.
  - (Kenya) Prisons took third place.
- October 7 – 14: 2017 Women's African Volleyball Championship in Yaoundé
  - Cameroon defeated Kenya, 3–0 in matches played, to win their first Women's African Volleyball Championship title.
  - Egypt took third place.
  - Note: Cameroon and Kenya both qualified to compete at the 2018 FIVB Volleyball Women's World Championship.
- October 22 – 29: 2017 Men's African Volleyball Championship in Cairo
  - Tunisia defeated Egypt, 3–0 in matches played, to win their ninth Men's African Volleyball Championship title.
  - Cameroon took third place.
  - Note: The three teams mentioned above all qualified to compete at the 2018 FIVB Volleyball Men's World Championship.
