= Walkenhorst =

Walkenhorst is a surname. Notable people with the surname include:

- Bob Walkenhorst, American singer, songwriter, musician, and painter
- Kira Walkenhorst (born 1990), German beach volleyball player
- Pia Walkenhorst (born 1993), German volleyball player
