= Markéta Sluková =

Czech beach volleyball player

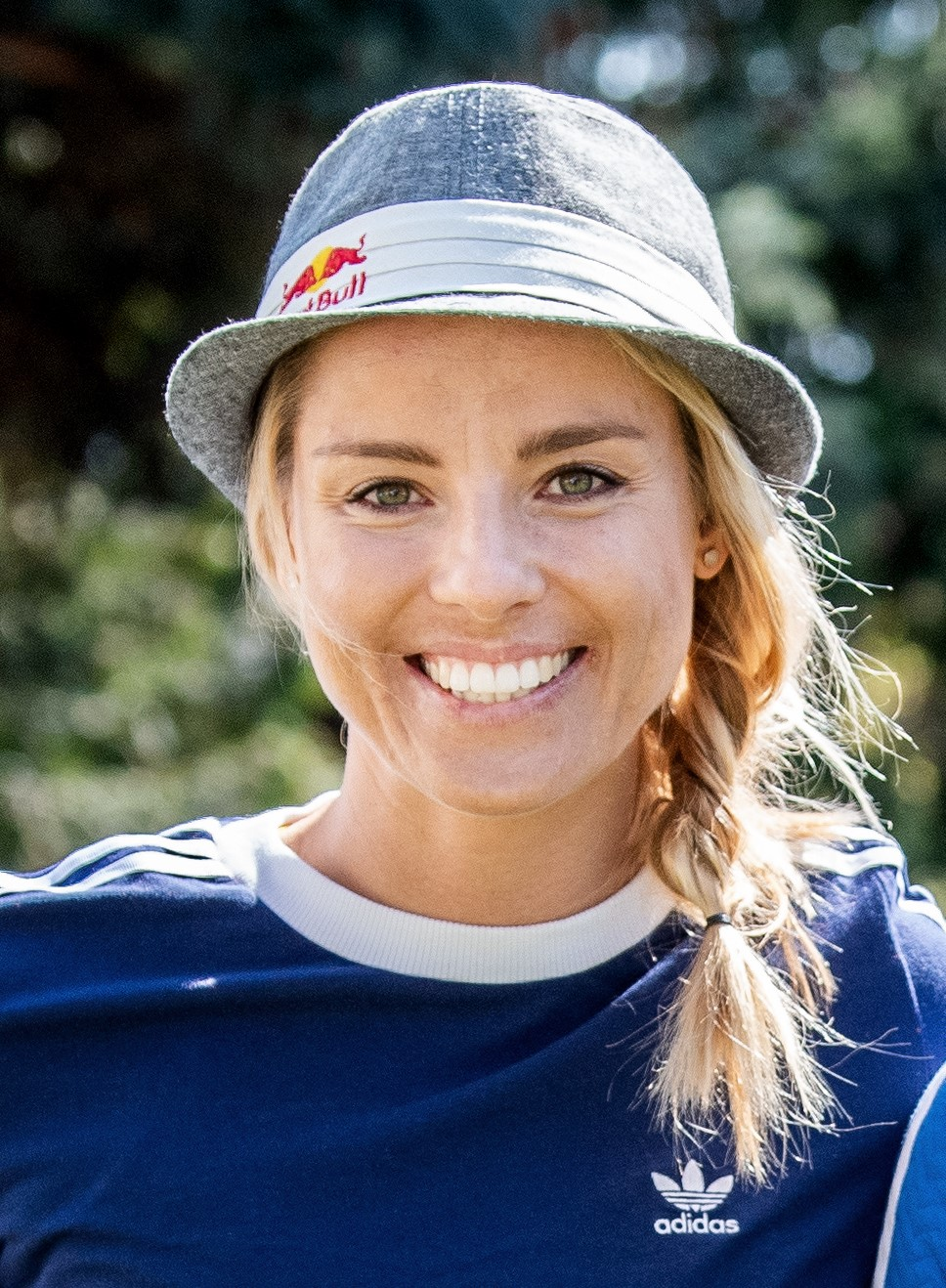
- Sluková in 2019

Personal information
- Full name: Markéta Nausch Sluková
- Nickname: Maki
- Nationality: Czech
- Born: 28 June 1988 (age 38); Prague, Czech Republic
- Height: 180 cm (5 ft 11 in)

Beach volleyball information

Current teammate
Years	Teammate
2022–	Helena Havelková

Previous teammates
Years	Teammate
2015–2021; 2005–2015	Barbora Hermannová; Kristýna Kolocová
Medal record
Women's beach volleyball
Representing the Czech Republic
FIVB Beach Volleyball World Tour
Bronze medal – third place	2014	Gstaad Grand Slam
Gold medal – first place	2014	Berlin Grand Slam
Gold medal – first place	2014	Prague Open
Gold medal – first place	2015	Antalya Open
Silver medal – second place	2016	European Championship
Bronze medal – third place	2017	Rio de Janeiro 4*
Silver medal – second place	2017	Porec Major
European Volleyball Confederation
Gold medal – first place	2016	European Masters
Awards
	2010	FIVB World Tour Rookie of the Year

Markéta Sluková (Czech pronunciation: [ˈmarkɛːta ˈslukovaː]; born 28 June 1988) is a Czech beach volleyball player. She took part in the Summer Olympics twice, finishing fifth in London in 2012, as well as reaching the last 16 of the Rio de Janeiro games in 2016. Outside of Olympic competition Sluková won silver at the 2016 2016 European Beach Volleyball Championships, as well as three golds on the FIVB World Tour.

== Early career ==
Sluková competed on the FIVB Beach Volleyball World Tour and was named the FIVB Rookie of the Year in 2010 with her partner Kristýna Kolocová. With Kolocová she achieved fifth place at the 2012 Summer Olympics in London. During the 2014 FIVB Beach Volleyball World Tour Sluková and Kolocová won gold medals at the Prague Open and Berlin Grand Slam, as well as a bronze medal at the Gstaad Grand Slam.

== Partnership with Barbora Hermannová ==
From August 2015 until 2021, Sluková played with Barbora Hermannová, and they were coached by Simon Nausch. Their first success was winning gold at the October 2015 World Tour tournament in Antalya. The pair reached the final of the 2016 European Beach Volleyball Championships, winning silver after losing in the final to defending champions Laura Ludwig and Kira Walkenhorst. It marked the first time a Czech team had won a European medal in beach volleyball since 2002, and Sluková was named the championship's most valuable player. They took part in the 2016 Summer Olympics in Rio de Janeiro, where they reached the round of 16. Although they qualified for the 2020 Summer Olympics in Tokyo, held in 2021, the team had to withdraw after Nausch Sluková became the fifth member of the Czech team to test positive for COVID-19, just two days before the start of the competition. Due to the same reason, Nausch Sluková did not participate in August 2021's European Championships, and was replaced in the Czech team by Marie-Sára Štochlová. At the end of August 2021 Nausch Sluková announced she was taking a break from the sport to start a family.

== Personal life ==
Sluková married Austrian volleyball coach Simon Nausch in the United States in 2016 after a seven-year relationship. She gave birth to a daughter in June 2022.

== Gallery ==
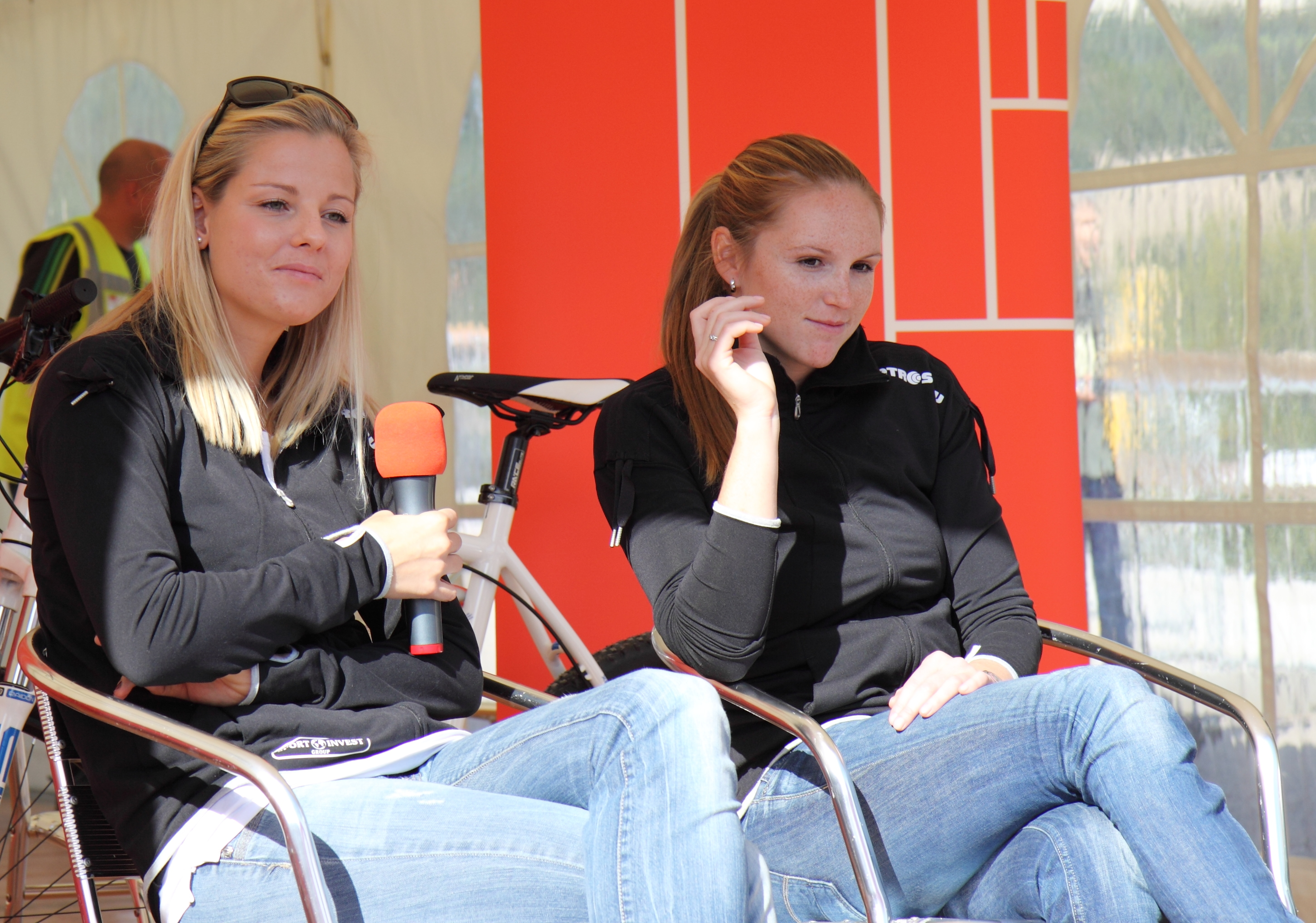
Sluková with her first teammate, Kristýna Kolocová, in 2012

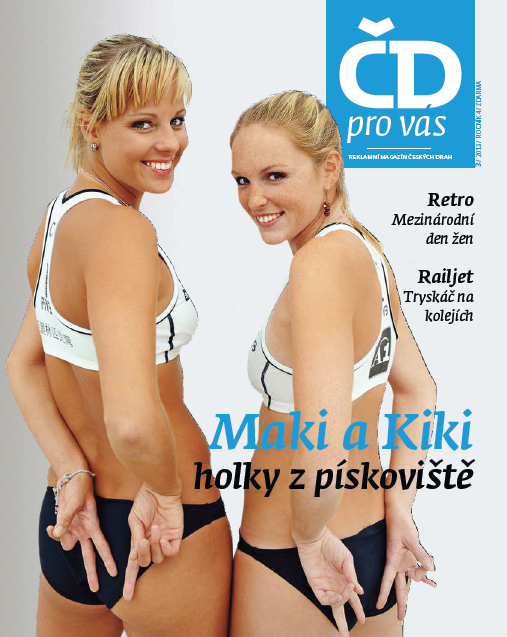
Sluková and Kolocová on the cover of ČD pro vás magazine (March 2013)

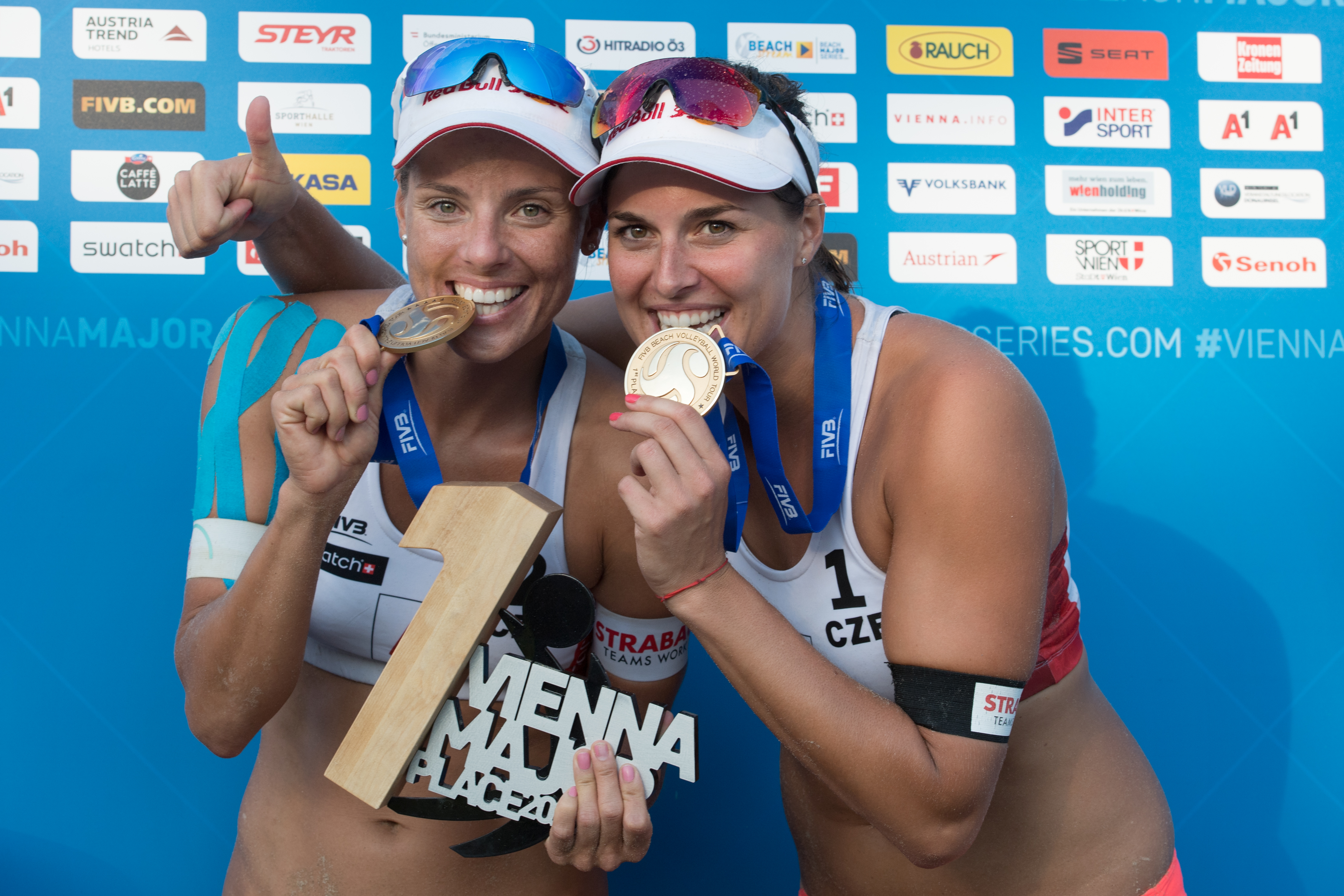
Sluková and Barbora Hermannova celebrate their gold medal at the FIVB Beach Volleyball World Tour Major Series Vienna on 4 August 2018
