= Pia Walkenhorst =

German volleyball player

Pia Sabrina Walkenhorst (born 15 November 1993 in Essen, Germany) is a German volleyball player.

== Family ==
Walkenhorst comes from a volleyball family. Her father was a youth international and trained them at the beginning of her career at VC Essen-Borbeck . Her older sister Kira was 2016 Olympic champion in beach volleyball in Rio. Her brother Alexander also plays volleyball and beach volleyball.

== Career ==
Pia Walkenhorst continued her athletic training from 2007 to 2009 when VC Olympia Berlin continued. At the German Championships U16 and U18 reached in 2007 and 2008 respectively the third place.

In 2009 joined the Universal player for junior team of Dresdner SC. She played in the junior national team and participated in the European Championship. After a season they moved up into the Bundesliga squad of Dresden.

In 2011/12 they played the Cup Winners Smart Allianz Stuttgart. Then she moved to the Second Bundesliga to CPSV volleys Chemnitz.

In 2015 Walkenhorst joined the second division Skurios Volleys Borken. In 2016, she has remained with this team and was awarded a Gold Medal.
