= Barbora Hermannová =

Czech beach volleyball player (born 1990)

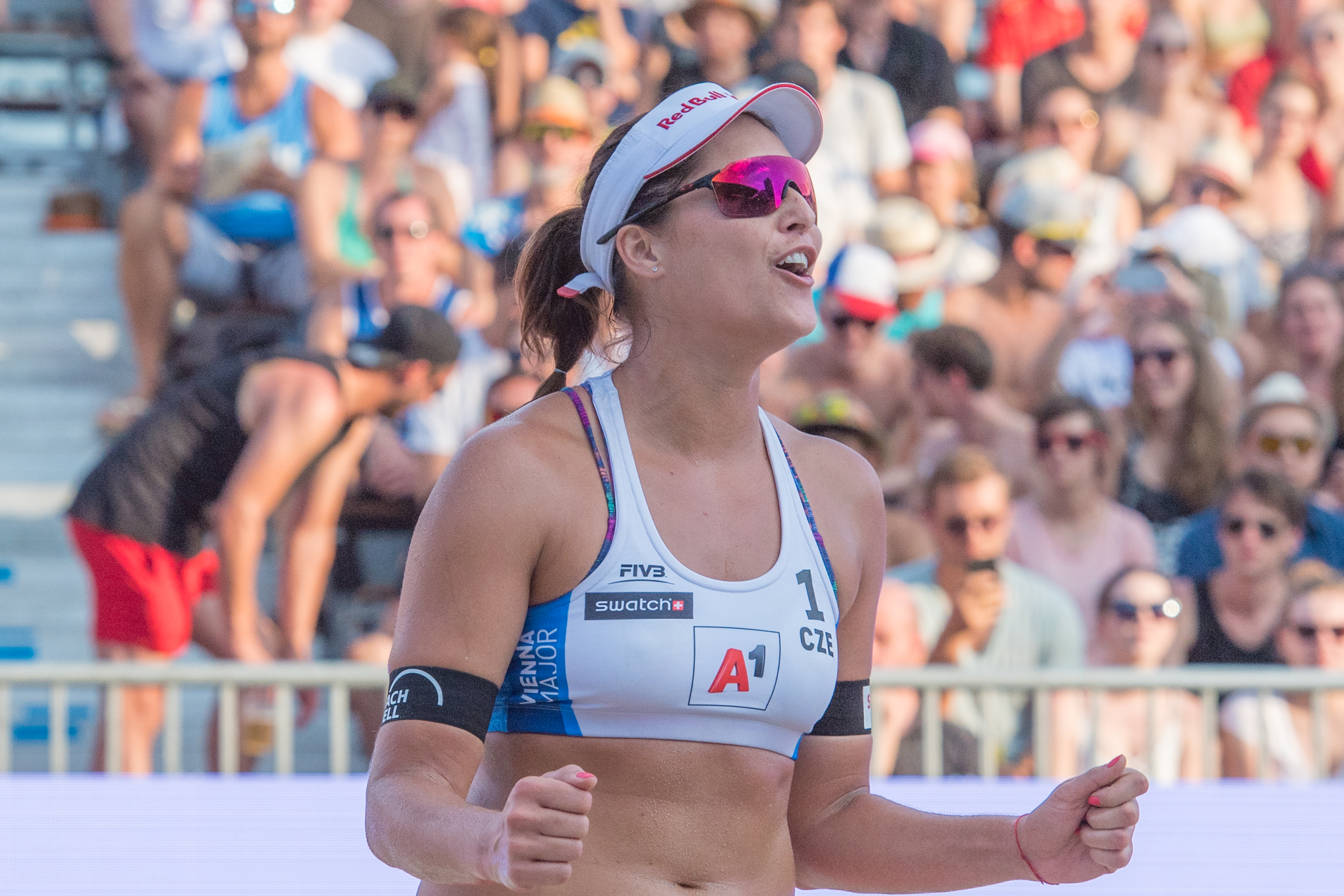

Personal information
- Full name: Barbora Hermannová
- Nickname: Bára
- Nationality: Czech
- Born: 7 November 1990 (age 35); Ostrava, Czech Republic
- Height: 180 cm (5 ft 11 in)

Beach volleyball information

Current teammate
Years	Teammate
2021–	Marie-Sára Štochlová

Previous teammates
Years	Teammate
2010–2015; 2015–2021	Martina Bonnerová; Markéta Sluková
Medal record
Women's beach volleyball
Representing the Czech Republic
FIVB Beach Volleyball World Tour
Gold medal – first place	2015	Antalya Open
Silver medal – second place	2016	European Championship
Bronze medal – third place	2017	Rio de Janeiro 4*
Silver medal – second place	2017	Porec Major
European Volleyball Confederation
Gold medal – first place	2016	European Masters

Barbora Hermannová (born 7 November 1990) is a Czech beach volleyball player. As of 2022, she plays with Marie-Sára Štochlová, with whom she competed for the Czech Republic at the 2024 Summer Olympics in Paris.

== Career ==
Hermannová made her first international appearance in 2008, finishing ninth in the World Youth Championships in The Hague with Michala Kvapilová. In 2009 she played a couple of Open tournaments with Šárka Nakládalová and then teamed up with Martina Bonnerová, who was her partner until 2015. In 2009 they finished seventh at the European U20 Championships in Greece and fourth at the World Junior Championships in Blackpool. A year later, they finished fifth in the same competition in Alanya. At the U23 European Championships in Kos, they finished seventh again. After these successes in the junior competition, they played their first Open tournament together in Mysłowice in 2011. Shortly afterwards, they won their first tournament at the satellite in Cyprus. In Porto, Bonnerová/Hermannová repeated their seventh place at the U23 European Championships. In 2012 they played their first Grand Slams in Shanghai and Beijing. At the European Championships in Scheveningen they finished fifth. At the 2013 World Championships in Stare Jabłonki, they were eliminated after the preliminary round without a win.

Markéta Sluková has been Hermannová's partner since August 2015. At the 2016 Olympic Games in Rio de Janeiro, Hermannová/Sluková finished third in the preliminary round after one win and two losses and were then eliminated in the "lucky loser" match against the Russian duo Ukolova/Birlova. In 2018 and 2019, Hermannová/Sluková were among the absolute top in the world. The two Czech women qualified for the 2021 Olympic Games in Tokyo via the world rankings. Two days before the start of the competitions, however, Sluková tested positive for SARS-CoV-2, so the Czech team was withdrawn without replacement.

After Sluková's career ended, Hermannová has been playing alongside Marie-Sára Štochlová since August 2021.
