= Katharina Schützenhöfer =

Austrian beach volleyball player

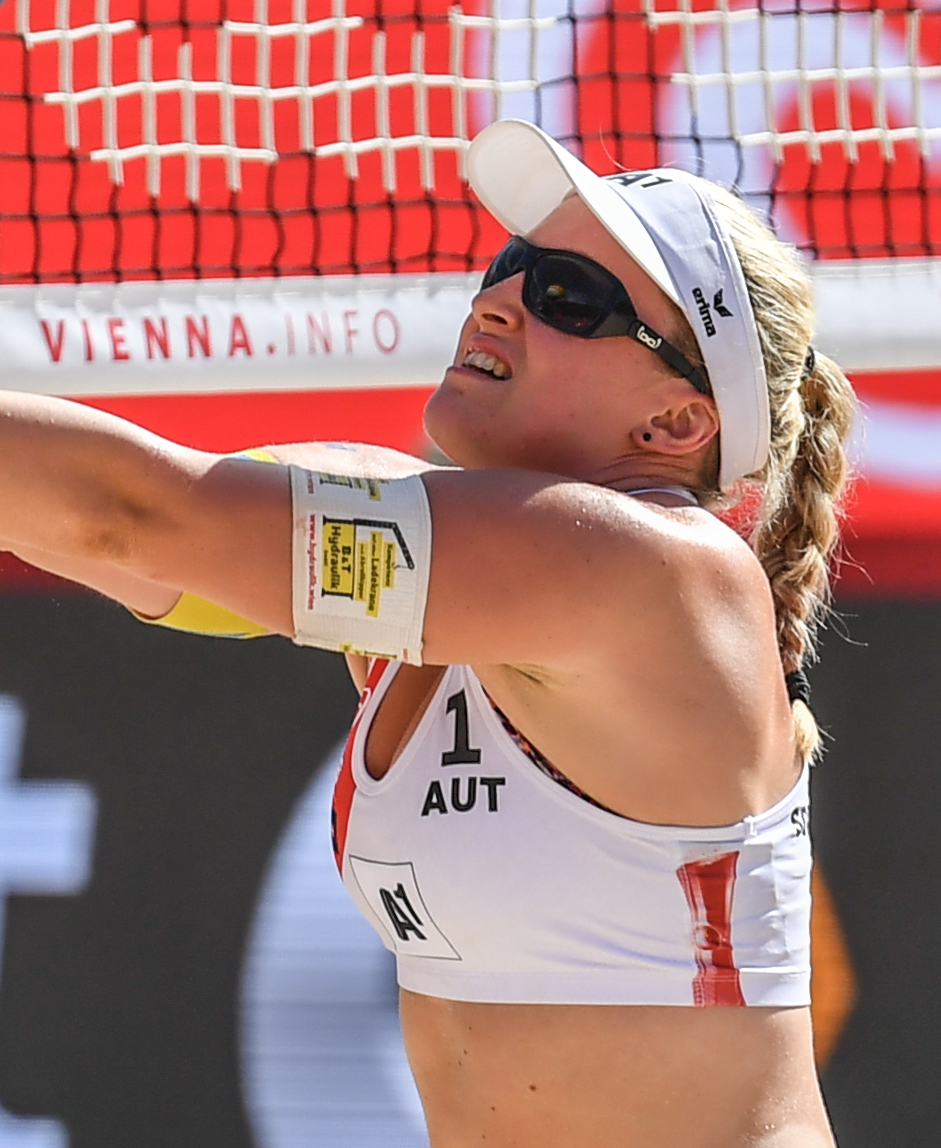
- Schützenhöfer in 2017

Personal information
- Full name: Katharina Elisabeth Schützenhöfer
- Nationality: Austria
- Born: 22 September 1993 (age 33); Oberwart, Austria
- Hometown: Wien, Austria
- Height: 1.75 m (5 ft 9 in)
- Weight: 73 kg (161 lb)

Beach volleyball information

Current teammate
Years	Teammate
2017–present	Lena Plesiutschnig

Previous teammates
Years	Teammate
2010–2016; 2013; 2017	Lena Plesiutschnig; Barbara Hansel; Stefanie Schwaiger
Medal record
Women's beach volleyball
Representing Austria
European Games
Silver medal – second place	2015 Baku	Beach
U21 World Championships
Bronze medal – third place	2013 Umag	Beach
U19 World Championships
Silver medal – second place	2011 Umag	Beach
U20 European Championships
Gold medal – first place	2011 Tel Aviv	Beach

Katharina Elisabeth Schützenhöfer (born 22 September 1993) is an Austrian professional beach volleyball player who plays as a right-side defender with her partner Lena Plesiutschnig. She won the silver medal at the first ever European Games in 2015. Her first and only FIVB World Tour victory so far, came at a 3-star event in Mersin in 2018. She won a silver medal at the 2011 U19 World Championship and a bronze medal at the 2013 U21 World Championship, both competitions were held in Umag. She is also the 2011 U20 European Champion with Plesiutschnig.

== Career podiums ==
=== FIVB World Tour ===
- 3 medals – (1 gold, 1 silver, 1 bronze)

No.	Result	Date	Category	Location	Partner	Opponents	Score		
1.	Bronze	26 Nov 2017	FIVB 2-star	Sydney, Australia	Lena Plesiutschnig	(Japan) Futami / Hasegawa	16–21	24–22	15–10
2.	Gold	6 May 2018	FIVB 3-star	Mersin, Turkey	Lena Plesiutschnig	(Netherlands) Keizer / Meppelink	18–21	25–23	15–12
3.	Silver	16 Jun 2018	FIVB 1-Star	Baden, Austria	Lena Plesiutschnig	(Germany) Mersmann / Tillmann	17–21	16–21	

=== CEV European Tour ===
- 2 medals – (1 silver, 1 bronze)

No.	Result	Date	Category	Location	Partner	Opponents	Score		
1.	Silver	20 Jun 2015	European Games	Baku, Azerbaijan	Lena Plesiutschnig	(Switzerland) Betschart / Eiholzer	16–21	21–14	13–15
2.	Bronze	11 Jul 2015	CEV Satellite	Vaduz, Liechtenstein	Lena Plesiutschnig	(France) Jupiter / Longuet	21–15	19–21	15–10
