= Riikka Lehtonen =

Finnish (beach) volleyball player (born 1979)

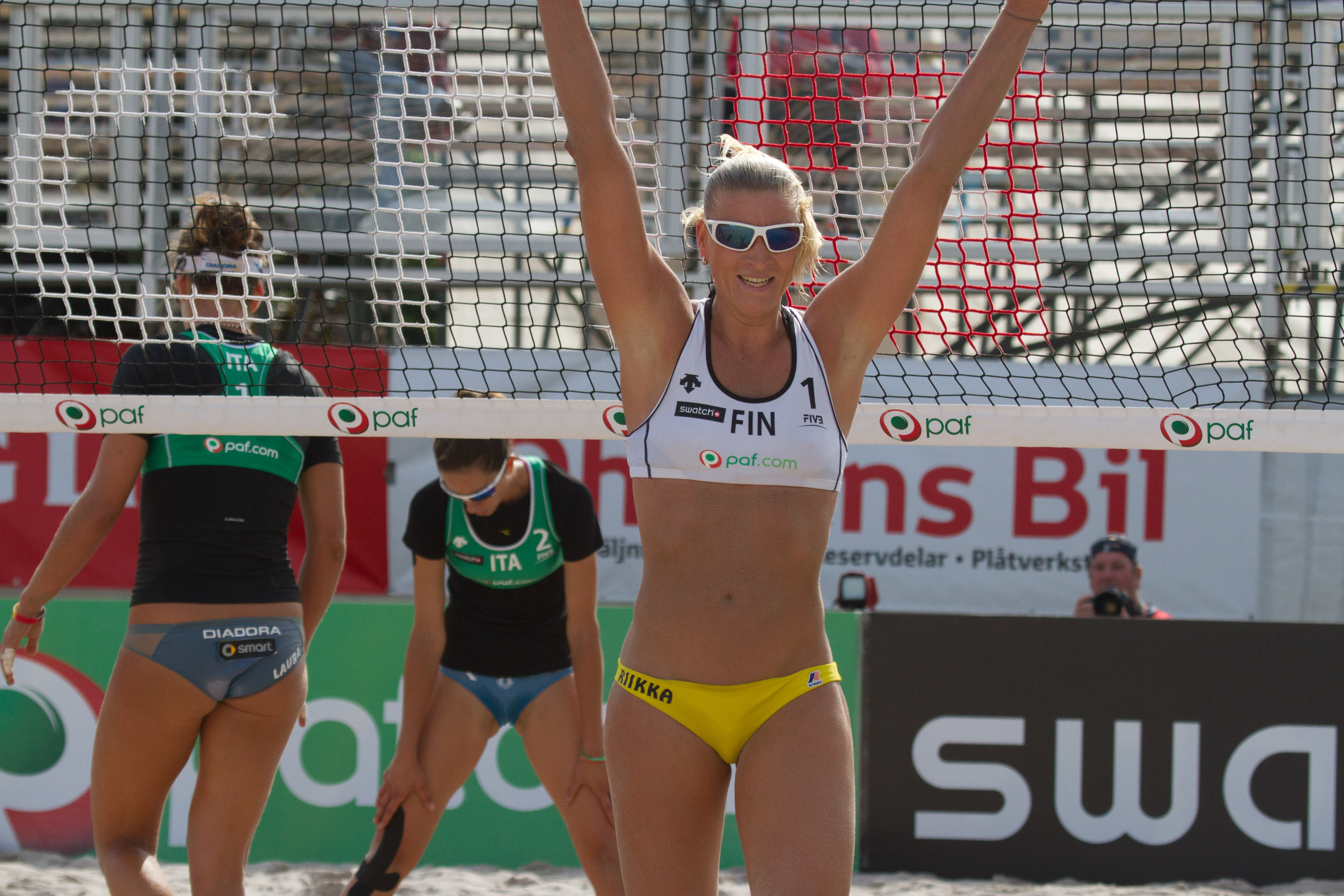

Personal information
- Full name: Riikka Hannele Lehtonen
- Born: 24 July 1979 (age 47); Kangasala, Finland
- Height: 1.81 m (5 ft 11 in)

Volleyball information
- Position: Libero

Career
Years	Teams
1995–1998; 1998–1999; 1999–2001; 2001–2004; 2004–2005; 2005–2006; 2006–2007; 2007–2008; 2008; 2008–2009; 2009–2010; 2010–2011; 2011–2012; 2012; 2012–2013; 2013	OrPo; Raiku; La Rochette; RC Cannes; Vicenza; Bergamo; NEC Red Rockets; Vakıfbank Istanbul; Pallavolo Villanterio; Olympiacos; Sirio Perugia; Igtisadchi Baku; River Volley; Crema; LP Kangasala; Azerrail Baku

National team
1995-	Finland

Riikka Lehtonen (born 24 July 1979 in Kangasala, Finland) is a Finnish volleyball and beach volley player. She is the most successful female volleyball player in Finland. Lehtonen has played for several professional clubs in Finland, France, Italy, Japan, Turkey, Greece and Azerbaijan.

Since 2014 Lehtonen has competed in the FIVB Beach Volleyball World Tour with Taru Lahti.

== Club honours ==
- (Finland) Finnish Championship: 1997, 1999, 2019
- (Finland) Finnish Cup: 1996, 1997, 2013
- (France) French Championship: 2002, 2003, 2004
- (France) French Cup: 2003, 2004
- (Italy) Italian Championship: 2006
- (Italy) Italian Cup: 2006
- CEV Women's Champions League: 2002, 2003
- CEV Women's Challenge Cup: 2008
