= Kira Walkenhorst =

German beach volleyball player

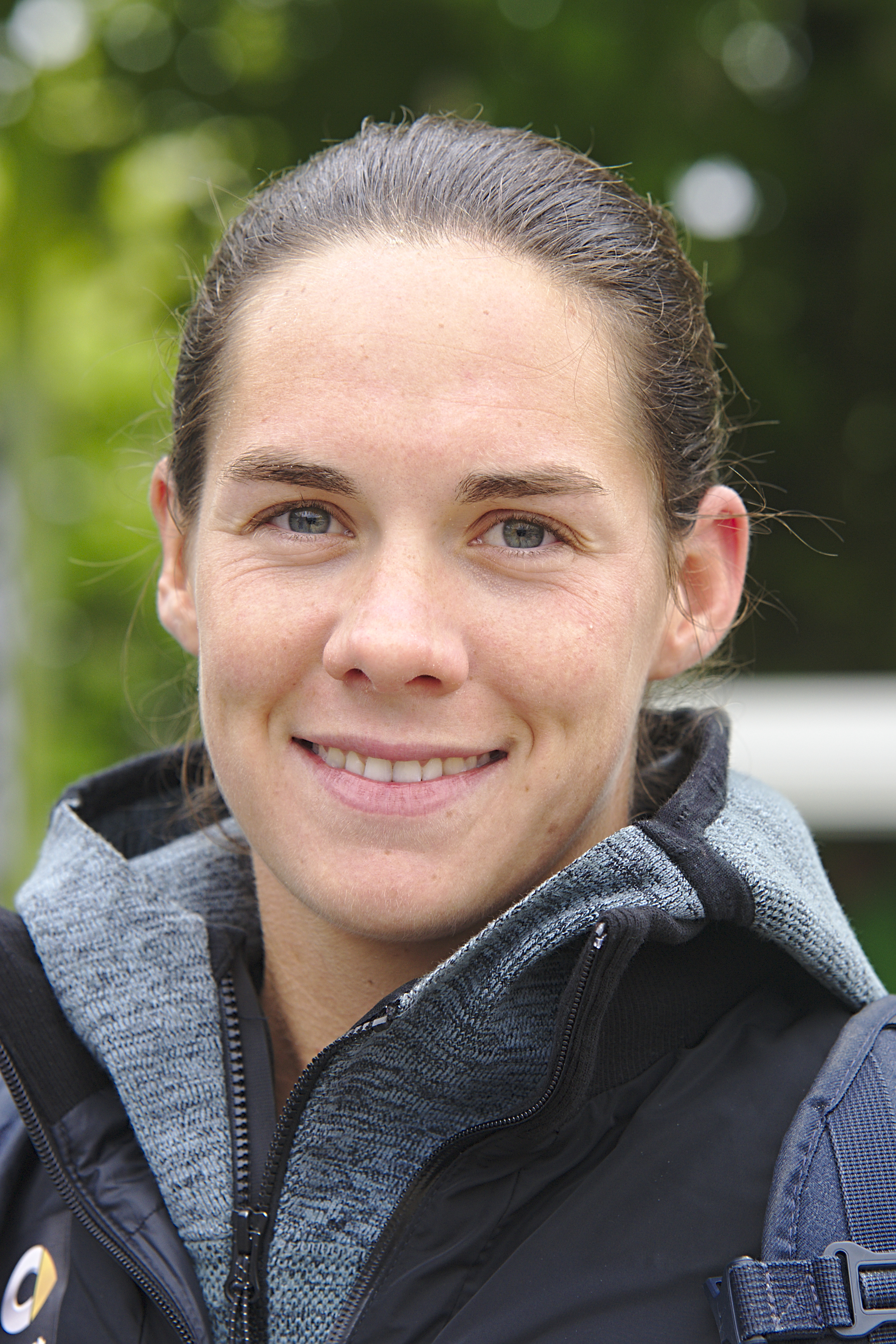
- Walkenhorst in 2017

Personal information
- Nationality: German
- Born: 18 November 1990 (age 36)
- Home town: Essen, Germany
- Height: 184 cm (6 ft 0 in)
- Weight: 75 kg (165 lb)
Beach volleyball information
Current teammate
- Years: Teammate
- –: Anna-Lena Grüne

Indoor volleyball information

National team
- Years: Team
- –: Germany
Honours
Women's beach volleyball
Representing Germany
Olympic Games
Gold medal – first place	2016 Rio de Janeiro	Beach
FIVB World Championships
Gold medal – first place	2017 Vienna	Beach
European Championships
Gold medal – first place	2016 Biel/Bienne	Beach
Gold medal – first place	2015 Klagenfurt	Beach
Bronze medal – third place	2014 Cagliari	Beach
Bronze medal – third place	2013 Klagenfurt	Beach

Kira Katharina Walkenhorst (born 18 November 1990) is a German retired beach volleyball player who played as a blocker. She has an older brother Alexander Walkenhorst who is a professional beach volleyball player and a younger sister Pia Walkenhorst who also plays beach volleyball.

Walkenhorst won the gold medal at the 2016 Summer Olympics in Rio de Janeiro together and at the 2017 World Championships with her teammate Laura Ludwig. She also won bronze medals at the 2013 and 2014 European Beach Volleyball Championships and gold medals at the 2015 and 2016 Beach ECH alongside her teammate Laura Ludwig.

She retired from competition at the start of 2019 due to persistent injuries.

In 2020, Walkenhorst made her comeback on the national tour and participated in the German championships.

== Professional career ==
=== 2016: Rio de Janeiro ===
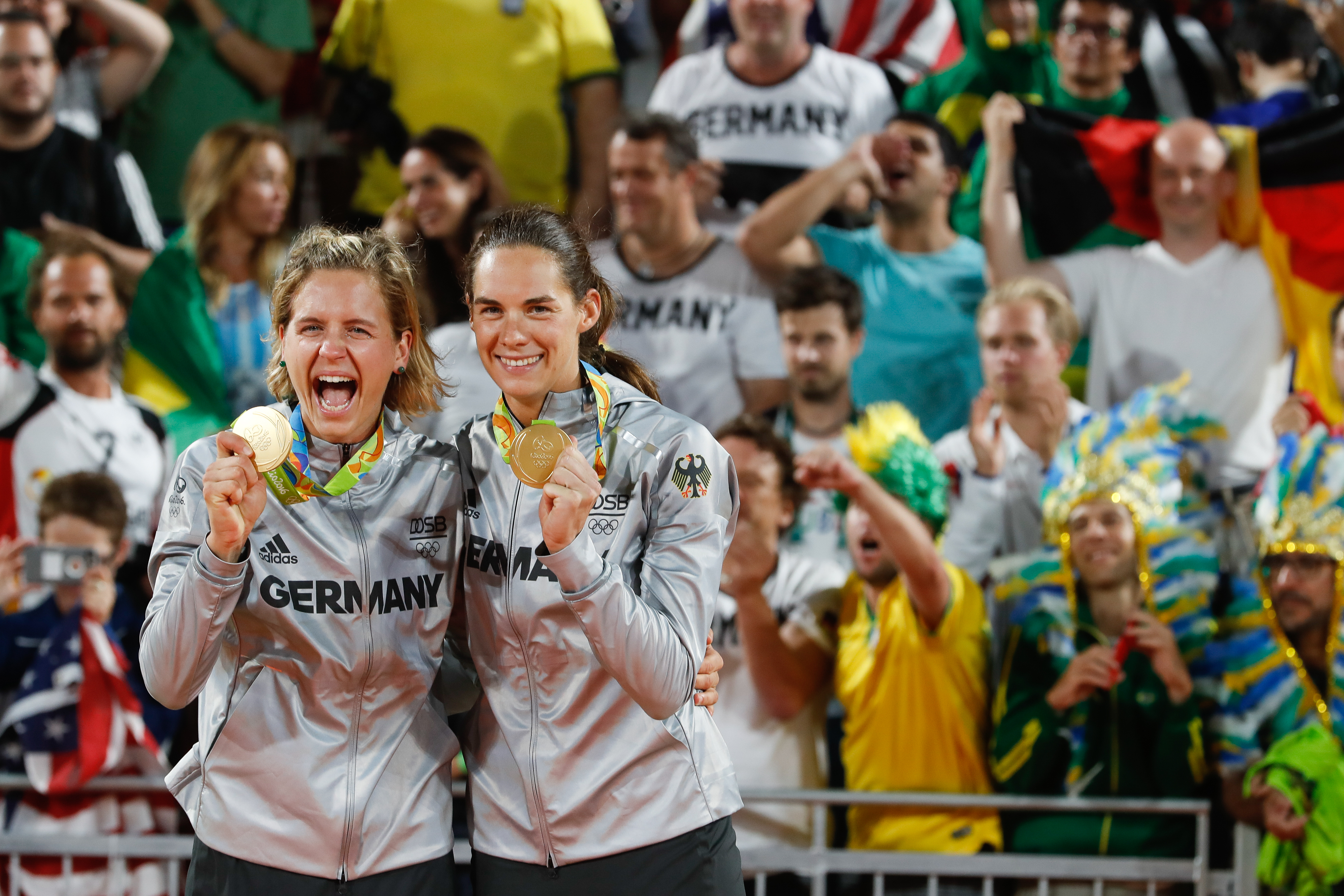
Gold Medal Rio Olympics 2016

Kira Walkenhorst participated in the 2016 summer Olympics in Rio together with her teammate Laura Ludwig. They won the gold medal in the final match against the Brazilian duo Ágatha Bednarczuk and Bárbara Seixas in straight sets of 21–18, 21-14 following their victory against the Brazilian duo Larissa França and Talita Antunes in the semi-finals.

=== 2016: World Tour ===
Walkenhorst competed in the World Tour Finals in Toronto. With teammate Laura they finished 3rd (Last) in Pool-B with 2 losses In the quarter-final match against Ross and Walsh they won in 3 sets of (21-18, 19–21, 15–11), advancing to the semi-final against Larissa and Talita of Brazil.

Winning against Brazil in straight sets of (21-19, 21–19) the pair advance to the gold medal match. Another GOLD medal for the Olympic winners in straight sets of (21-18, 21–16) against the Swiss pair of Zumkehr and Heidrich

=== 2017 season ===
Walkenhorst opened the 2017 season at Fort Lauderdale Major with temporary partner Julia Großner while her regular partner Laura Ludwig recovered from a shoulder injury. They won two out of their three pool play matches to make it through to the Final 24. Here they lost 0:2 to Meppelink / Van Gestel (NED) so finished the tournament in 17th position. At the world championships in Vienna, Ludwig / Walkenhorst won the gold medal after beating Lauren Fendrick and April Ross in the final.

== Personal life ==
In late 2016, Walkenhorst came out as a lesbian. In October 2017, she married her longtime girlfriend and trainer Maria Kleefisch. One year later, her wife Maria gave birth to triplets.

Sporting positions
Preceded by Larissa França and Talita Antunes (BRA)	Women's FIVB Beach World Tour Winner alongside (Germany) Laura Ludwig; 2016	Succeeded by Larissa França and Talita Antunes (BRA)
Awards
Preceded by Sarah Pavan (CAN)	Women's FIVB World Tour "Best Blocker"; 2016	Succeeded by Sarah Pavan (CAN)
Preceded by Kerri Walsh Jennings (USA)	Women's FIVB World Tour "Best Hitter"; 2017	Succeeded by Incumbent
Preceded by Sophie van Gestel (NED)	Women's FIVB World Tour "Most Improved"; 2013	Succeeded by Tanja Hüberli (SUI)
Preceded by Bárbara Seixas (BRA)	Women's FIVB World Tour "Top Rookie"; 2013	Succeeded by Melissa Humana-Paredes (CAN)
Preceded by Larissa França and Talita Antunes (BRA)	Women's FIVB World Tour "Team of the Year" alongside (Germany) Laura Ludwig; 2016	Succeeded by Larissa França and Talita Antunes (BRA)
