= Julia Großner =

German beach volleyball player

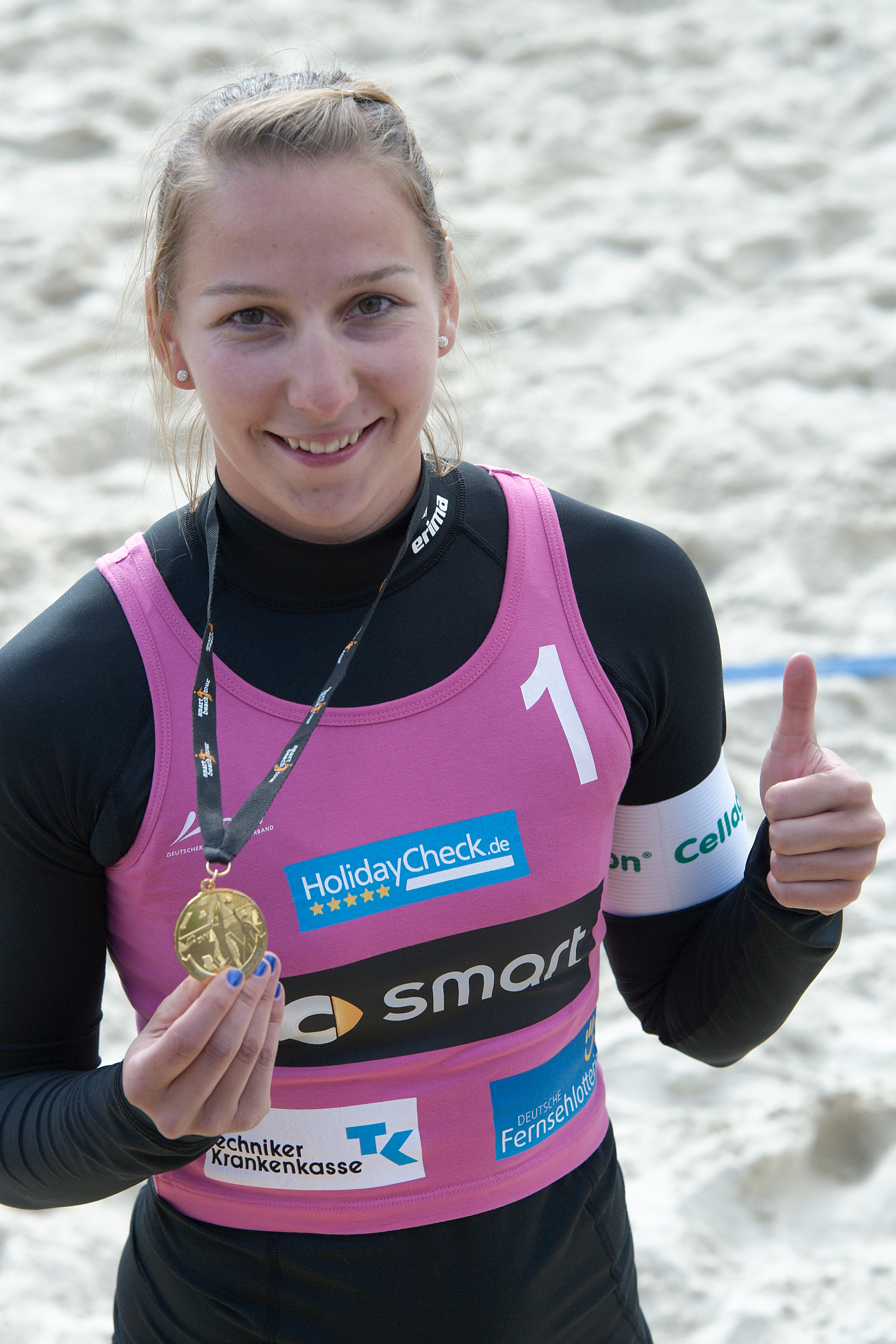
Großner after winning a 2012 tournament in Münster

Julia Großner (born May 4, 1988 in Weimar, Germany) is a professional beach volleyball player.

== Career ==
Julia Großner started playing volleyball in the hall in Erfurt in 1997 and has been playing in the sand since 2003. With Jenny Heinemann, she won the German Championship of the C- and B-Youth in 2004. In 2006, she played with Katharina Schillerwein and in 2007 with Liane Lehmann on national tournaments. Together with Frederike Fischer she started nationally and internationally from 2008 to 2010. In 2009, Julia Grossner became the U23 European champion in the Russian Jantarny alongside Britta Büthe.

From 2011 to 2016 Grossner played with Victoria Bieneck. In the first tournament of the year 2013, the duo Bieneck / Großner took fourth place at the CEV Satellite tournament in Antalya (Turkey). At the World Championships in Stare Jabłonki Bieneck / Großner reached the main round, where they beat the Italians Cicolari / Menegatti. At the German Championships, Bieneck / Großner took fifth place in 2013. In 2014, Bieneck / Großner won the first victory at the Anapa Open in Russia on the FIVB World Tour. In the European Championships and the German Championships, they became fourth respectively in 2014.

In 2017 Grossner plays alongside will have a new partner - Nadja Glenzke.

For the opening tournament in 2017 at Fort Lauderdale Major Julia partnered Kira Walkenhorst, whose regular partner Laura Ludwig was recovering from a shoulder operation. They won two out of their three pool play matches to make it through to the Final 24. Here they lost 0:2 to Meppelink / Van Gestel (NED) and finished the tournament in 17th position.

In October 2017 she won the European Beach Volleyball Championships alongside her partner Nadia Glenzke.
