= Kristýna Kolocová =

Czech beach volleyball player

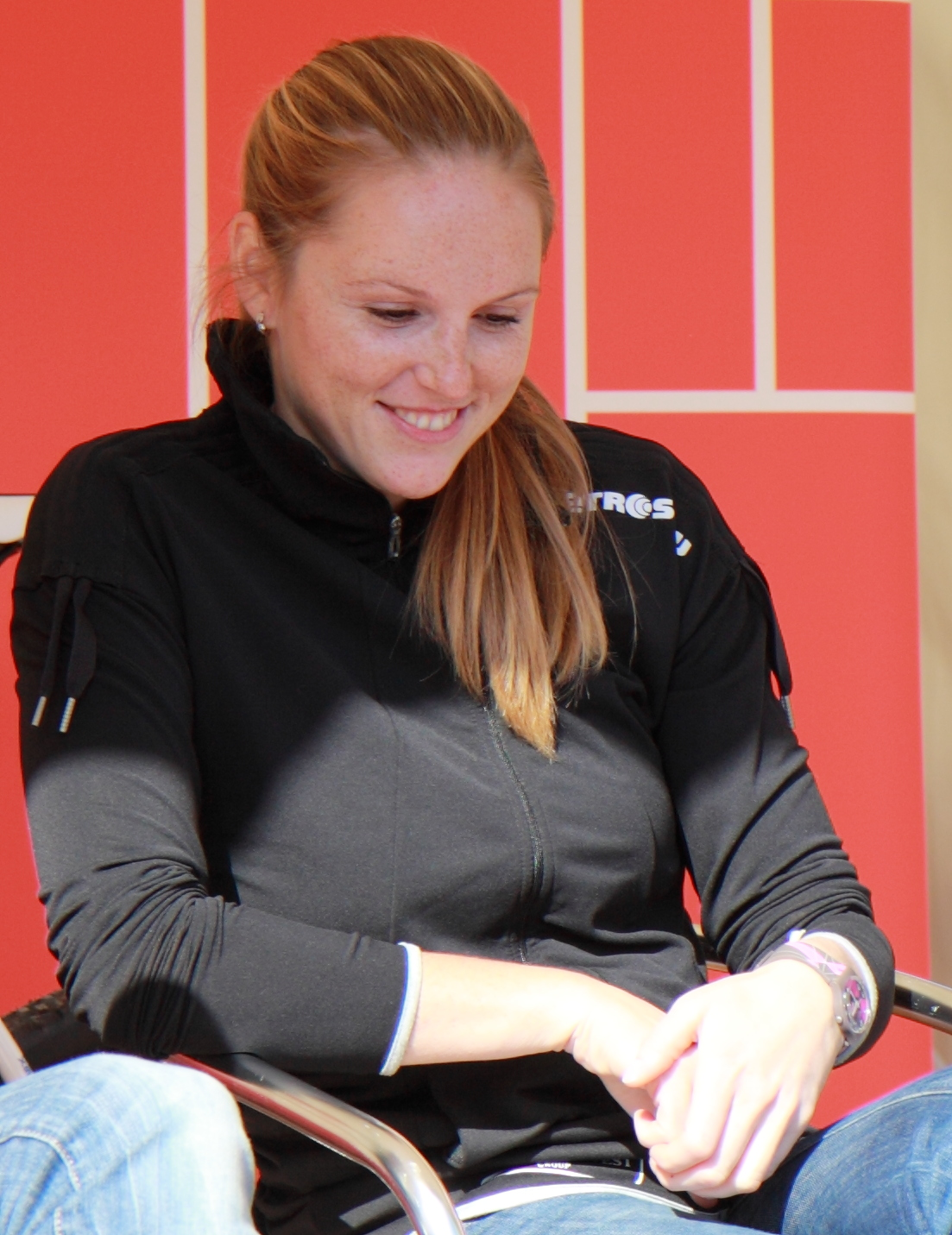
- Kolocová in 2012

Personal information
- Full name: Kristýna Hoidarová Kolocová
- Nickname: Kiki
- Nationality: Czech
- Born: 1 April 1988 (age 38); Nymburk, Czechoslovakia
- Height: 170 cm (5 ft 7 in)

Beach volleyball information

Current teammate
| Years | Teammate |
|---|---|
| 2016–2018 | Michala Kvapilová |

Previous teammates
| Years | Teammate |
|---|---|
| 2005–2015 | Markéta Sluková |
Medal record
Women's beach volleyball
Representing the Czech Republic
FIVB Beach Volleyball World Tour
| Bronze medal – third place | 2014 | Gstaad Grand Slam |
| Gold medal – first place | 2014 | Berlin Grand Slam |
| Gold medal – first place | 2014 | Prague Open |
European Volleyball Confederation
| Gold medal – first place | 2016 | Satellite Vaduz |
| Silver medal – second place | 2016 | European Masters |
| Silver medal – second place | 2017 | European Championship |
| Gold medal – first place | 2018 | European Masters |

Kristýna Kolocová (Czech pronunciation: [ˈkrɪstiːna ˈkolotsovaː]; born 1 April 1988) is a former Czech beach volleyball player. She and Markéta Sluková placed 5th at the 2012 Summer Olympics in London. They qualified from Group C, then beat the Brazilian team of Antonelli and Antunes in the round of 16. They lost to the team of Jennifer Kessy and April Ross, the eventual silver medalists, in the quarter finals.

Kolocová announced her retirement in August 2018.
