= Michala Kvapilová =

Czech volleyball player (born 1990)

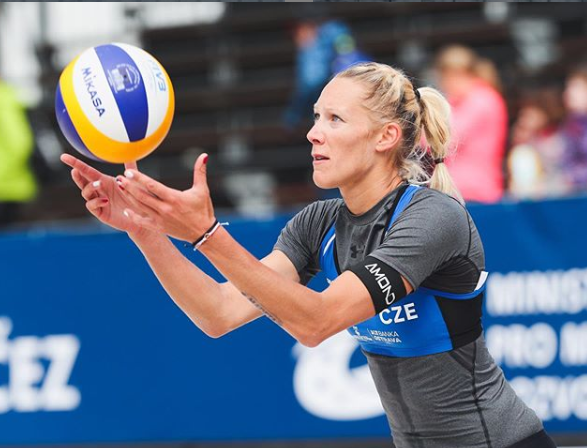
- Michala Kvapilová

Personal information
- Full name: Michala Kvapilová
- Nationality: Czech
- Born: 8 February 1990 (age 36); Ostrava, Czechoslovakia
- Height: 180 cm (5 ft 11 in)

Beach volleyball information

Current teammate
Years	Teammate
2016-present	Kristýna Kolocová
Medal record
Representing the Czech Republic
Women's beach volleyball
European Volleyball Confederation
Gold medal – first place	2016	Satellite Vaduz
Silver medal – second place	2016	European Masters
Silver medal – second place	2017	European Championship
Gold medal – first place	2018	European Masters

Michala Kvapilová (born 8 February 1990) is a Czech female volleyball player. She is part of the Czech Republic women's national volleyball team.

She participated in the 2014 FIVB Volleyball World Grand Prix, and in the 2015 FIVB Volleyball World Grand Prix. On club level she played for PVK Olymp Praha in 2014.
