= 2015 FIVB Beach Volleyball World Tour =

International beach volleyball circuit

Tournament details
- Host country: Various
- Dates: April – October, 2015
- Venues: 17 (in 17 host cities)

The 2015 FIVB Beach Volleyball World Tour was an international beach volleyball circuit organized by the Fédération Internationale de Volleyball (FIVB).

From this season, the FIVB World Tour calendar comprises by 5 FIVB World Tour Grand Slams, 6 Open tournaments (Prague only for women), the newly FIVB Major Series with three events and the FIVB Beach Volleyball World Championships.

An inaugural edition of the FIVB World Tour Finals was held in the United States and concluded the season.

== Schedule ==
Key

World Championships
World Tour Finals
Grand Slam
Major Series
Open tournaments

=== Men ===
| Tournament | Champions | Runners-up | Third place | Fourth place |
|---|---|---|---|---|
| Fuzhou Open; Fuzhou, China; 21 – 25 April | Markus Böckermann (GER); Lars Flüggen (GER); 21–19, 21–19 | Alexander Brouwer (NED); Robert Meeuwsen (NED) | Youssef Krou (FRA); Édouard Rowlandson (FRA); 19–21, 21–17, 15–9 | Todd Rogers (USA); Stafford Slick (USA) |
| Lucerne Open; Lucerne, Switzerland; 13 – 17 May | Alex Ranghieri (ITA); Marco Caminati (ITA); Walkover | Alexander Brouwer (NED); Robert Meeuwsen (NED) | Murat Giginoğlu (TUR); Volkan Göğtepe (TUR); 21–18, 18–21, 15–4 | Nico Beeler (SUI); Alexei Strasser (SUI) |
| Moscow Grand Slam; Moscow, Russia; 26 – 31 May | Pablo Herrera (ESP); Adrián Gavira (ESP); 21–19, 21–19 | Evandro Oliveira (BRA); Pedro Solberg Salgado (BRA) | Jonathan Erdmann (GER); Kay Matysik (GER); 21–19, 21–17 | Alison Cerutti (BRA); Bruno Oscar Schmidt (BRA) |
| Porec Major; Poreč, Croatia; 3 – 7 June | Alexander Brouwer (NED); Robert Meeuwsen (NED); 21–15, 21–13 | Josh Binstock (CAN); Sam Schachter (CAN) | Alex Ranghieri (ITA); Adrian Carambula (ITA); 21–18, 18–21, 15–10 | Reinder Nummerdor (NED); Christiaan Varenhorst (NED) |
| Stavanger Major; Stavanger, Norway; 9 – 14 June | Evandro Oliveira (BRA); Pedro Solberg Salgado (BRA); 21–13, 21–14 | Bartosz Łosiak (POL); Piotr Kantor (POL) | Grzegorz Fijałek (POL); Mariusz Prudel (POL); 21–13, 21–15 | Matteo Ingrosso (ITA); Paolo Ingrosso (ITA) |
| St. Petersburg Grand Slam; St. Petersburg, Florida, United States; 16 – 21 June | Jake Gibb (USA); Casey Patterson (USA); 16–21, 23–21, 15–13 | Reinder Nummerdor (NED); Christiaan Varenhorst (NED) | Nicholas Lucena (USA); Theo Brunner (USA); 21–19, 21–16 | Clemens Doppler (AUT); Alexander Horst (AUT) |
| FIVB World Championships; Amsterdam, Apeldoorn, Rotterdam and The Hague, Netherlands; 26 June – 5 July | Alison Cerutti (BRA); Bruno Oscar Schmidt (BRA); 12–21, 21–14, 22–20 | Reinder Nummerdor (NED); Christiaan Varenhorst (NED) | Evandro Oliveira (BRA); Pedro Solberg Salgado (BRA); 22–20, 21–13 | Nicholas Lucena (USA); Theo Brunner (USA) |
| Gstaad Major; Gstaad, Switzerland; 8 – 12 July | Alison Cerutti (BRA); Bruno Oscar Schmidt (BRA); 21–16, 13–21, 15–10 | Aleksandrs Samoilovs (LAT); Jānis Šmēdiņš (LAT) | Alexander Brouwer (NED); Robert Meeuwsen (NED); 18–21, 21–16, 15–10 | Alex Ranghieri (ITA); Adrian Carambula (ITA) |
| Yokohama Grand Slam; Yokohama, Japan; 21 – 26 July | Alison Cerutti (BRA); Bruno Oscar Schmidt (BRA); 21–15, 21–15 | Chaim Schalk (CAN); Ben Saxton (CAN) | Clemens Doppler (AUT); Alexander Horst (AUT); 21–17, 21–16 | Konstantin Semenov (RUS); Viacheslav Krasilnikov (RUS) |
| Long Beach Grand Slam; Long Beach, California, United States; 18 – 23 August | Alison Cerutti (BRA); Bruno Oscar Schmidt (BRA); 21–16, 20–22, 15–13 | Nicholas Lucena (USA); Phil Dalhausser (USA) | Pablo Herrera (ESP); Adrián Gavira (ESP); 9–21, 21–17, 15–12 | Alexander Brouwer (NED); Robert Meeuwsen (NED) |
| Olsztyn Grand Slam; Olsztyn, Poland; 25 – 30 August | Alison Cerutti (BRA); Bruno Oscar Schmidt (BRA); 21–10, 21–15 | Jake Gibb (USA); Casey Patterson (USA) | Chaim Schalk (CAN); Ben Saxton (CAN); 21–17, 21–18 | Jonathan Erdmann (GER); Kay Matysik (GER) |
| Rio de Janeiro Open; Rio de Janeiro, Brazil; 2 – 6 September | Aleksandrs Samoilovs (LAT); Jānis Šmēdiņš (LAT); 21–15, 25–23 | Markus Böckermann (GER); Lars Flüggen (GER) | Saymon Santos (BRA); Gustavo Carvalhaes (BRA); 21–14, 17–21, 15–8 | Alison Cerutti (BRA); Bruno Oscar Schmidt (BRA) |
| Sochi Open; Sochi, Russia; 8 – 13 September | Aleksandrs Samoilovs (LAT); Jānis Šmēdiņš (LAT); 24–22, 21–19 | Nicholas Lucena (USA); Phil Dalhausser (USA) | Paolo Nicolai (ITA); Daniele Lupo (ITA); 21–18, 15–21, 15–13 | Konstantin Semenov (RUS); Viacheslav Krasilnikov (RUS) |
| Xiamen Open; Xiamen, China; 22 – 26 September | Nicholas Lucena (USA); Phil Dalhausser (USA); 21–16, 21–17 | Markus Böckermann (GER); Lars Flüggen (GER) | Aleksandrs Samoilovs (LAT); Jānis Šmēdiņš (LAT); 21–17, 21–13 | Mārtiņš Pļaviņš (LAT); Haralds Regža (LAT) |
| Ft. Lauderdale Swatch Beach Volleyball; FIVB World Tour Finals; Fort Lauderdale, Florida, United States; 29 September – 4 October | Alison Cerutti (BRA); Bruno Oscar Schmidt (BRA); 21–13, 21–15 | Nicholas Lucena (USA); Phil Dalhausser (USA) | Evandro Oliveira (BRA); Pedro Solberg Salgado (BRA); 21–19, 21–14 | Alexander Brouwer (NED); Robert Meeuwsen (NED) |

=== Women ===
| Tournament | Champions | Runners-up | Third place | Fourth place |
|---|---|---|---|---|
| Fuzhou Open; Fuzhou, China; 22 – 26 April | Jamie Broder (CAN); Kristina Valjas (CAN); 21–17, 23–21 | Chantal Laboureur (GER); Julia Sude (GER) | Kerri Walsh Jennings (USA); April Ross (USA); 13–21, 21–13, 15–11 | Wang Fan (CHN); Yue Yuan (CHN) |
| Lucerne Open; Lucerne, Switzerland; 12 – 17 May | Karla Borger (GER); Britta Büthe (GER); 16–21, 21–16, 15–13 | Madelein Meppelink (NED); Marleen van Iersel (NED) | Jamie Broder (CAN); Kristina Valjas (CAN); 21–18, 21–15 | Stefanie Schwaiger (AUT); Barbara Hansel (AUT) |
| Prague Open; Prague, Czech Republic; 20 – 24 May | Ágatha Bednarczuk (BRA); Bárbara Seixas (BRA); 21–12, 21–18 | Heather Bansley (CAN); Sarah Pavan (CAN) | Eduarda Lisboa (BRA); Elize Maia (BRA); Walkover | Maria Clara Salgado (BRA); Carolina Solberg Salgado (BRA) |
| Moscow Grand Slam; Moscow, Russia; 26 – 31 May | Larissa França (BRA); Talita Antunes (BRA); 21–17, 21–14 | Madelein Meppelink (NED); Marleen van Iersel (NED) | Marta Menegatti (ITA); Viktoria Orsi Toth (ITA); 14–21, 21–19, 16–14 | Wang Fan (CHN); Yue Yuan (CHN) |
| Porec Major; Poreč, Croatia; 2 – 6 June | Larissa França (BRA); Talita Antunes (BRA); 21–16, 25–27, 15–12 | Heather Bansley (CAN); Sarah Pavan (CAN) | Louise Bawden (AUS); Taliqua Clancy (AUS); 21–15, 21–17 | Jamie Broder (CAN); Kristina Valjas (CAN) |
| Stavanger Major; Stavanger, Norway; 9 – 13 June | Juliana Silva (BRA); Maria Antonelli (BRA); 21–16, 21–15 | Ágatha Bednarczuk (BRA); Bárbara Seixas (BRA) | Madelein Meppelink (NED); Marleen van Iersel (NED); 21–17, 16–21, 15–13 | Laura Ludwig (GER); Kira Walkenhorst (GER) |
| St. Petersburg Grand Slam; St. Petersburg, Florida, United States; 17 – 21 June | Ágatha Bednarczuk (BRA); Bárbara Seixas (BRA); 23–21, 21–19 | Juliana Silva (BRA); Maria Antonelli (BRA) | Taiana Lima (BRA); Fernanda Alves (BRA); 17–21, 21–19, 17–15 | Karla Borger (GER); Britta Büthe (GER) |
| FIVB World Championships; Amsterdam, Apeldoorn, Rotterdam and The Hague, Netherlands; 26 June – 5 July | Ágatha Bednarczuk (BRA); Bárbara Seixas (BRA); 21–18, 22–20 | Taiana Lima (BRA); Fernanda Alves (BRA) | Juliana Silva (BRA); Maria Antonelli (BRA); 23–25, 21–18, 15–9 | Katrin Holtwick (GER); Ilka Semmler (GER) |
| Gstaad Major; Gstaad, Switzerland; 7 – 11 July | Larissa França (BRA); Talita Antunes (BRA); 21–13, 21–17 | Taiana Lima (BRA); Fernanda Alves (BRA) | Heather Bansley (CAN); Sarah Pavan (CAN); Walkover | Kerri Walsh Jennings (USA); April Ross (USA) |
| Yokohama Grand Slam; Yokohama, Japan; 21 – 26 July | Laura Ludwig (GER); Kira Walkenhorst (GER); 21–14, 21–17 | Ágatha Bednarczuk (BRA); Bárbara Seixas (BRA) | Heather Bansley (CAN); Sarah Pavan (CAN); 15–21, 22–20, 15–9 | April Ross (USA); Jennifer Fopma (USA) |
| Long Beach Grand Slam; Long Beach, California, United States; 18 – 23 August | Larissa França (BRA); Talita Antunes (BRA); 21–18, 21–16 | Kerri Walsh Jennings (USA); April Ross (USA) | Laura Ludwig (GER); Kira Walkenhorst (GER); 21–17, 21–13 | Louise Bawden (AUS); Taliqua Clancy (AUS) |
| Olsztyn Grand Slam; Olsztyn, Poland; 25 – 29 August | Larissa França (BRA); Talita Antunes (BRA); 21–12, 25–23 | Madelein Meppelink (NED); Marleen van Iersel (NED) | Kinga Kołosińska (POL); Monika Brzostek (POL); 21–12, 21–16 | Sophie van Gestel (NED); Jantine van der Vlist (NED) |
| Rio de Janeiro Open; Rio de Janeiro, Brazil; 2 – 6 September | Larissa França (BRA); Talita Antunes (BRA); 32–30, 18–21, 15–12 | Ágatha Bednarczuk (BRA); Bárbara Seixas (BRA) | Madelein Meppelink (NED); Marleen van Iersel (NED); 21–15, 21–17 | Juliana Silva (BRA); Maria Antonelli (BRA) |
| Sochi Open; Sochi, Russia; 8 – 13 September | Marta Menegatti (ITA); Viktoria Orsi Toth (ITA); 21–19, 21–16 | Isabelle Forrer (SUI); Anouk Vergé-Dépré (SUI) | Nadine Zumkehr (SUI); Joana Heidrich (SUI); 21–18, 21–18 | Riikka Lehtonen (FIN); Taru Lahti (FIN) |
| Xiamen Open; Xiamen, China; 23 – 27 September | Nadine Zumkehr (SUI); Joana Heidrich (SUI); 21–18, 21–17 | Ana Gallay (ARG); Georgina Klug (ARG) | Isabelle Forrer (SUI); Anouk Vergé-Dépré (SUI); 21–14, 24–22 | Katrin Holtwick (GER); Ilka Semmler (GER) |
| Ft. Lauderdale Swatch Beach Volleyball; FIVB World Tour Finals; Fort Lauderdale, Florida, United States; 29 September – 4 October | Larissa França (BRA); Talita Antunes (BRA); 21–17, 21–18 | Laura Ludwig (GER); Kira Walkenhorst (GER) | Ágatha Bednarczuk (BRA); Bárbara Seixas (BRA); 22–20, 14–21, 15–10 | Heather Bansley (CAN); Sarah Pavan (CAN) |

== Medal table by country ==
| Rank | Nation | Gold | Silver | Bronze | Total |
|---|---|---|---|---|---|
| 1 | Brazil (BRA) | 18 | 7 | 7 | 32 |
| 2 | Germany (GER) | 3 | 4 | 2 | 9 |
| 3 | United States (USA) | 2 | 5 | 2 | 9 |
| 4 | Latvia (LAT) | 2 | 1 | 1 | 4 |
| 5 | Italy (ITA) | 2 | 0 | 3 | 5 |
| 6 | Netherlands (NED) | 1 | 7 | 3 | 11 |
| 7 | Canada (CAN) | 1 | 4 | 4 | 9 |
| 8 | Switzerland (SUI) | 1 | 1 | 2 | 4 |
| 9 | Spain (ESP) | 1 | 0 | 1 | 2 |
| 10 | Poland (POL) | 0 | 1 | 2 | 3 |
| 11 | Argentina (ARG) | 0 | 1 | 0 | 1 |
| 12 | Australia (AUS) | 0 | 0 | 1 | 1 |
| 12 | Austria (AUT) | 0 | 0 | 1 | 1 |
| 12 | France (FRA) | 0 | 0 | 1 | 1 |
| 12 | Turkey (TUR) | 0 | 0 | 1 | 1 |
| Totals (15 entries) | | 31 | 31 | 31 | 93 |
