= 2017 FIVB Beach Volleyball World Tour =

Tournament details
- Host country: Various
- Dates: February – August, 2017
- Venues: 21 (in 21 host cities)

The 2017 FIVB Beach Volleyball World Tour was the global elite professional beach volleyball circuit organized by the Fédération Internationale de Volleyball (FIVB) for the 2017 beach volleyball season. The 2017 FIVB Beach Volleyball World Tour Calendar comprised three FIVB World Tour 5-star tournaments, two 4-star, four 3-star, four 2-star and six 1-star events, the World Championships and the World Tour Finals, all organised by the FIVB.

The 2017 edition of the Swatch Beach Volleyball FIVB World Tour Finals will be held in Hamburg, Germany from 22 to 27 August.

== Schedule ==
Key

World Championships
World Tour Finals
5-star tournament/Major Series
4-star tournament
3-star tournament
2-star tournament
1-star tournament

=== Men ===
Tournament	Champions	Runners-up	Third place	Fourth place
Fort Lauderdale Major; Fort Lauderdale, USA; 7–11 February	Álvaro Morais Filho (BRA); Saymon Santos (BRA); 21–15, 21–17	Evandro Oliveira (BRA); André Stein (BRA)	Phil Dalhausser (USA); Nick Lucena (USA); 14–21, 21–13, 15–10	John Hyden (USA); Ryan Doherty (USA)
Kish Island Open; Kish island, Iran; 15–18 February	Nikita Liamin (RUS); Viacheslav Krasilnikov (RUS); 18–21, 21–19, 15–8	Piotr Kantor (POL); Bartosz Łosiak (POL)	Oleg Stoyanovskiy (RUS); Artem Yarzutkin (RUS); 13–21, 21–17, 15–7	Lorenz Schümann (GER); Julius Thole (GER)
Shepparton Open; Shepparton, Australia; 4–5 March	Christopher McHugh (AUS); Damien Schumann (AUS); 21–18, 21–18	Cole Durant (AUS); Zachery Schubert (AUS)	Ben O'Dea (NZL); Sam O'Dea (NZL); 21–12, 21–14	Adam Roberts (USA); Martin Lorenz (USA)
Langkawi Open; Langkawi, Malaysia; 15–16 April	Nivaldo Díaz (CUB); Sergio González (CUB); 21–17, 21–18	Florian Schnetzer (AUT); Peter Eglseer (AUT)	Mart Tiisaar (EST); Kusti Nõlvak (EST); 21–17, 21–17	Lazar Kolarić (SRB); Đorđe Klašnić (SRB)
Xiamen Open; Xiamen, China; 20–23 April	Alexander Brouwer (NED); Robert Meeuwsen (NED); 21–14, 21–17	Paolo Nicolai (ITA); Daniele Lupo (ITA)	Maciej Rudol (POL); Jakub Szałankiewicz (POL); 21–16, 21–17	Armin Dollinger (GER); Jonathan Erdmann (GER)
Rio de Janeiro Open; Rio de Janeiro, Brazil; 18–21 May	Alison Cerutti (BRA); Bruno Oscar Schmidt (BRA); 25–23, 21–12	Bartosz Łosiak (POL); Piotr Kantor (POL)	Paolo Nicolai (ITA); Daniele Lupo (ITA); 21–15, 24–26, 15–11	Theo Brunner (USA); Casey Patterson (USA)
Moscow Open; Moscow, Russia; 30 May–4 June	Phil Dalhausser (USA); Nick Lucena (USA); 21–17, 22–24, 18–16	Viacheslav Krasilnikov (RUS); Nikita Liamin (RUS)	Oleg Stoyanovskiy (RUS); Artem Yarzutkin (RUS); 18–21, 21–14, 15–8	Jānis Šmēdiņš (LAT); Aleksandrs Samoilovs (LAT)
The Hague Open; The Hague, Netherlands; 13–18 June	Viacheslav Krasilnikov (RUS); Nikita Liamin (RUS); 23–21, 22–20	Pablo Herrera (ESP); Adrián Gavira (ESP)	Paolo Nicolai (ITA); Daniele Lupo (ITA); 21–18, 21–15	Nico Beeler (SUI); Marco Krattiger (SUI)
Poreč Major; Poreč, Croatia; 27 June–2 July	Gustavo Carvalhaes (BRA); Pedro Solberg Salgado (BRA); 18–21, 25–23, 15–9	Paolo Nicolai (ITA); Daniele Lupo (ITA)	Alison Cerutti (BRA); Bruno Oscar Schmidt (BRA); 21–15, 21–18	Oleg Stoyanovskiy (RUS); Artem Yarzutkin (RUS)
Gstaad Major; Gstaad, Switzerland; 4–9 July	Phil Dalhausser (USA); Nick Lucena (USA); 21–18, 21–19	Bartosz Łosiak (POL); Piotr Kantor (POL)	Álvaro Morais Filho (BRA); Saymon Santos (BRA); 21–12, 21–18	Evandro Oliveira (BRA); André Stein (BRA)
Olsztyn Open; Olsztyn, Poland; 19–23 July	Markus Böckermann (GER); Lars Flüggen (GER); 15–21, 21–18, 15–11	Ryan Doherty (USA); John Hyden (USA)	Juan Virgen (MEX); Lombardo Ontiveros (MEX); 21–17, 22–20	Mārtiņš Pļaviņš (LAT); Haralds Regža (LAT)
Agadir Open; Agadir, Morocco; 21–23 July	Youssef Krou (FRA); Quincy Ayé (FRA); 21–18, 21–14	Júlio Nascimento Júnior (QAT); Ahmed Tijan (QAT)	Bahman Salemi (IRI); Rahman Raoufi (IRI); 19–21, 21–19, 16–14	Zouheir El Graoui (MAR); Mohamed Abicha (MAR)
Espinho Open; Espinho, Portugal; 28–30 July	George Wanderley (BRA); Vitor Felipe (BRA); 21–12, 21–13	Júlio Nascimento Júnior (QAT); Ahmed Tijan (QAT)	Anders Mol (NOR); Mathias Berntsen (NOR); 22–20, 21–15	Christian Sørum (NOR); Svein Solhaug (NOR)
World Championships; Vienna, Austria; 28 July–6 August	Evandro Oliveira (BRA); André Stein (BRA); 23–21, 22–20	Clemens Doppler (AUT); Alexander Horst (AUT)	Viacheslav Krasilnikov (RUS); Nikita Liamin (RUS); 21–17, 21–17	Christiaan Varenhorst (NED); Maarten van Garderen (NED)
Swatch FIVB World Tour Finals; Hamburg, Germany; 23–27 August	Phil Dalhausser (USA); Nick Lucena (USA); 21–15, 21–13	Evandro Oliveira (BRA); André Stein (BRA)	Paolo Nicolai (ITA); Daniele Lupo (ITA); 21–17, 19–21, 15–12	Bartosz Łosiak (POL); Piotr Kantor (POL)

=== Women ===
Tournament	Champions	Runners-up	Third place	Fourth place
Fort Lauderdale Major; Fort Lauderdale, USA; 7–12 February	Larissa França (BRA); Talita Antunes (BRA); 21–15, 21–18	Ágatha Bednarczuk (BRA); Eduarda Lisboa (BRA)	Chantal Laboureur (GER); Julia Sude (GER); 21–14, 21–14	Brooke Sweat (USA); Summer Ross (USA)
Shepparton Open; Shepparton, Australia; 4–5 March	Julie Gordon (CAN); Camille Saxton (CAN); 21–17, 21–14	Kim Behrens (GER); Anni Schumacher (GER)	Phoebe Bell (AUS); Nicole Laird (AUS); 21–14, 21–16	Leonie Körtzinger (GER); Sandra Seyfferth (GER)
Sydney Open; Sydney, Australia; 17–19 March	Julie Gordon (CAN); Camille Saxton (CAN); 21–14, 21–16	Mariafe Artacho del Solar (AUS); Jessyka Ngauamo (AUS)	Louise Bawden (AUS); Nicole Laird (AUS); 21–18, 22–24, 15–11	Kim Behrens (GER); Anni Schumacher (GER)
Langkawi Open; Langkawi, Malaysia; 15–16 April	Emily Stockman (USA); Kimberly Dicello (USA); 22–20, 22–24, 17–15	Martina Bonnerová (CZE); Šárka Nakládalová (CZE)	Cornelia Rimser (AUT); Lena Plesiutschnig (AUT); 21–18, 21–13	Nadine Strauss (AUT); Teresa Strauss (AUT)
Xiamen Open; Xiamen, China; 20–23 April	Bárbara Seixas (BRA); Fernanda Alves (BRA); 21–12, 19–21, 16–14	Wang Fan (CHN); Yue Yuan (CHN)	Victoria Bieneck (GER); Isabel Schneider (GER); 21–16, 21–19	Maria Antonelli (BRA); Carolina Horta (BRA)
Rio de Janeiro Open; Rio de Janeiro, Brazil; 18–21 May	Ágatha Bednarczuk (BRA); Eduarda Lisboa (BRA); 21–14, 13–21, 15–13	Sarah Pavan (CAN); Melissa Humana-Paredes (CAN)	Barbora Hermannová (CZE); Markéta Sluková (CZE); 23–21, 21–18	Bárbara Seixas (BRA); Fernanda Alves (BRA)
Moscow Open; Moscow, Russia; 31 May–4 June	Larissa França (BRA); Talita Antunes (BRA); 21–16, 21–14	Brooke Sweat (USA); Summer Ross (USA)	Ágatha Bednarczuk (BRA); Eduarda Lisboa (BRA); 21–14, 21–8	Victoria Bieneck (GER); Isabel Schneider (GER)
The Hague Open; The Hague, Netherlands; 13–18 June	Maria Antonelli (BRA); Carolina Solberg (BRA); 21–17, 21–11	Joana Heidrich (SUI); Anouk Vergé-Dépré (SUI)	Ágatha Bednarczuk (BRA); Eduarda Lisboa (BRA); 16–21, 21–13, 15–11	Sarah Pavan (CAN); Melissa Humana-Paredes (CAN)
Nanjing Open; Nanjing, China; 16–18 June	Betsi Flint (USA); Kelley Larsen (USA); 21–19, 21–12	Wen Shuhui (CHN); Xia Xinyi (CHN)	Ieva Dumbauskaitė (LTU); Monika Povilaitytė (LTU); 25–23, 17–21, 15–7	Martina Bonnerová (CZE); Šárka Nakládalová (CZE)
Monaco Open; Monaco, Monaco; 17–18 June	Juliana Silva (BRA); Carolina Horta (BRA); 21–16, 15–21, 15–13	Kim Behrens (GER); Anni Schumacher (GER)	Peny Karagkouni (GRE); Konstantina Tsopoulou (GRE); 21–15, 16–21, 15–9	Shaunna Marie Polley (NZL); Kelsie Wills (NZL)
Nantong Open; Nantong, China; 23–25 June	Wen Shuhui (CHN); Xia Xinyi (CHN); 21–18, 21–14	Wang Fan (CHN); Yue Yuan (CHN)	Ieva Dumbauskaitė (LTU); Monika Povilaitytė (LTU); 26–24, 21–19	Yulia Abalakina (RUS); Ksenia Dabizha (RUS)
Poreč Major; Poreč, Croatia; 27 June–1 July	Sarah Pavan (CAN); Melissa Humana-Paredes (CAN); 32–34, 21–12, 15–6	Barbora Hermannová (CZE); Markéta Sluková (CZE)	Nina Betschart (SUI); Tanja Hüberli (SUI); 21–19, 21–14	Bárbara Seixas (BRA); Fernanda Alves (BRA)
Gstaad Major; Gstaad, Switzerland; 4–8 July	Chantal Laboureur (GER); Julia Sude (GER); 21–18, 22–20	Larissa França (BRA); Talita Antunes (BRA)	Sarah Pavan (CAN); Melissa Humana-Paredes (CAN); 21–15, 21–12	Joana Heidrich (SUI); Anouk Vergé-Dépré (SUI)
Daegu Open; Daegu, South Korea; 14–16 July	Miki Ishii (JPN); Megumi Murakami (JPN); 21–14, 15–21, 17–15	Varapatsorn Radarong (THA); Tanarattha Udomchavee (THA)	Kateřina Valková (CZE); Diana Žolnerčíková (CZE); 21–14, 24–22	Lisa Arnholdt (GER); Leonie Welsch (GER)
Ulsan Open; Ulsan, South Korea; 20–22 July	Betsi Flint (USA); Kelley Larsen (USA); 21–16, 21–13	Varapatsorn Radarong (THA); Tanarattha Udomchavee (THA)	Shaunna Marie Polley (NZL); Kelsie Wills (NZL); 21–17, 21–18	Rumpaipruet Numwong (THA); Khanittha Hongpak (THA)
Olsztyn Open; Olsztyn, Poland; 19–23 July	Larissa França (BRA); Talita Antunes (BRA); 20–22, 21–18, 16–14	Sarah Pavan (CAN); Melissa Humana-Paredes (CAN)	Ágatha Bednarczuk (BRA); Eduarda Lisboa (BRA); Walkover	Kerri Walsh Jennings (USA); Nicole Branagh (USA)
Agadir Open; Agadir, Morocco; 21–23 July	Nicole Eiholzer (SUI); Dunja Gerson (SUI); 21–19, 21–18	Akiko Hasegawa (JPN); Azusa Futami (JPN)	Lézana Placette (FRA); Aline Chamereau (FRA); 21–9, 21–12	Érika Mongelós (PAR); Gabriela Filippo (PAR)
World Championships; Vienna, Austria; 28 July–5 August	Laura Ludwig (GER); Kira Walkenhorst (GER); 19–21, 21–13, 15–9	April Ross (USA); Lauren Fendrick (USA)	Larissa França (BRA); Talita Antunes (BRA); 21–12, 16–21, 18–16	Sarah Pavan (CAN); Melissa Humana-Paredes (CAN)
Swatch FIVB World Tour Finals; Hamburg, Germany; 23–26 August	Laura Ludwig (GER); Kira Walkenhorst (GER); 21–17, 19–21, 15–10	Ágatha Bednarczuk (BRA); Eduarda Lisboa (BRA)	Larissa França (BRA); Talita Antunes (BRA); 21–17, 21–19	Sarah Pavan (CAN); Melissa Humana-Paredes (CAN)

== Medal table by country ==
Rank	Nation	Gold	Silver	Bronze	Total
1	Brazil (BRA)	12	5	7	24
2	United States (USA)	6	3	1	10
3	Germany (GER)	4	2	2	8
4	Canada (CAN)	3	2	1	6
5	Russia (RUS)	2	1	3	6
6	China (CHN)	1	3	0	4
7	Australia (AUS)	1	2	2	5
8	Switzerland (SUI)	1	1	1	3
9	Japan (JPN)	1	1	0	2
10	France (FRA)	1	0	1	2
11	Cuba (CUB)	1	0	0	1
11	Netherlands (NED)	1	0	0	1
13	Poland (POL)	0	3	1	4
14	Italy (ITA)	0	2	3	5
15	Czech Republic (CZE)	0	2	2	4
16	Austria (AUT)	0	2	1	3
17	Qatar (QAT)	0	2	0	2
17	Thailand (THA)	0	2	0	2
19	Spain (ESP)	0	1	0	1
20	Lithuania (LTU)	0	0	2	2
20	New Zealand (NZL)	0	0	2	2
22	Estonia (EST)	0	0	1	1
22	Greece (GRE)	0	0	1	1
22	Iran (IRI)	0	0	1	1
22	Mexico (MEX)	0	0	1	1
22	Norway (NOR)	0	0	1	1
Totals (26 entries)		34	34	34	102
