= 2015 Beach Volleyball World Championships – Women's tournament =

2015 Beach Volleyball World Championships – Men's tournament
Tournament details
- Host country: Netherlands
- Dates: 26 June – 4 July
- Teams: 48 (from 5 confederations)

Final positions
- Champions: Brazil; Bárbara Seixas; Ágatha Bednarczuk (1st title)
- Runners-up: Brazil; Fernanda Alves; Taiana Lima
- Third place: Brazil; Maria Elisa Antonelli; Juliana Silva
- Fourth place: Germany; Katrin Holtwick; Ilka Semmler

The women's tournament was held from 26 June to 4 July 2015.

Bárbara Seixas and Ágatha Bednarczuk won the title, defeating their countrymen Maria Elisa Antonelli and Juliana Silva. Maria Elisa Antonelli and Juliana Silva won the bronze medal who also represented Brazil.

== Preliminary round ==
Qualified for the Round of 32 as pool winners or runners-up
Qualified for the Round of 32 as one of the best four third-placed teams
Qualified for the Lucky Losers Playoffs
Eliminated

=== Pool A ===
Pos	Team	Pld	W	L	Pts	SW	SL	SR	SPW	SPL	SPR	Qualification
1	(Netherlands) Meppelink–Van Iersel	3	3	0	6	6	1	6.000	140	82	1.707	Round of 32
2	(Canada) Humana-Paredes–Pischke	3	2	1	5	4	3	1.333	132	108	1.222	Round of 32
3	(Kazakhstan) Mashkova–Tsimbalova	3	1	2	4	4	4	1.000	153	126	1.214	Round of 32
4	(Guatemala) Orellana–Orellana	3	0	3	3	0	6	0.000	27	126	0.214	

Date	Time		Score		Set 1	Set 2	Set 3	Total	Report
26 Jun	19:40	Meppelink–Van Iersel (Netherlands)	2–1	(Kazakhstan) Mashkova–Tsimbalova	21–19	20–22	15–12	56–53	Report
27 Jun	20:45	Humana-Paredes–Pischke (Canada)	2–0	(Guatemala) Orellana–Orellana	21–11	21–7		42–18	Report
28 Jun	12:30	Mashkova–Tsimbalova (Kazakhstan)	2–0	(Guatemala) Orellana–Orellana	21–7	21–2		42–9	Report
28 Jun	15:30	Meppelink–Van Iersel (Netherlands)	2–0	(Canada) Humana-Paredes–Pischke	21–15	21–14		42–29	Report
29 Jun	15:30	Humana-Paredes–Pischke (Canada)	2–1	(Kazakhstan) Mashkova–Tsimbalova	22–24	24–22	15–12	61–58	Report
29 Jun	19:40	Meppelink–Van Iersel (Netherlands)	w/o	(Guatemala) Orellana–Orellana	21–0	21–0		42–0	Report

=== Pool B ===
Pos	Team	Pld	W	L	Pts	SW	SL	SR	SPW	SPL	SPR	Qualification
1	(Brazil) Larissa–Talita	3	3	0	6	6	1	6.000	138	105	1.314	Round of 32
2	(Switzerland) Goricanec–Hüberli	3	2	1	5	4	2	2.000	116	106	1.094	Round of 32
3	(Netherlands) Van der Vlist–Van Gestel	3	1	2	4	3	5	0.600	121	147	0.823	Round of 32
4	(Thailand) Radarong–Udomchavee	3	0	3	3	1	6	0.167	111	137	0.810	

Date	Time		Score		Set 1	Set 2	Set 3	Total	Report
27 Jun	11:00	Goricanec–Hüberli (Switzerland)	2–0	(Thailand) Radarong–Udomchavee	22–20	21–12		43–32	Report
27 Jun	13:00	Larissa–Talita (Brazil)	2–1	(Netherlands) Van der Vlist–Van Gestel	21–15	18–21	15–10	54–46	Report
28 Jun	18:00	Larissa–Talita (Brazil)	2–0	(Thailand) Radarong–Udomchavee	21–10	21–18		42–28	Report
28 Jun	19:00	Goricanec–Hüberli (Switzerland)	2–0	(Netherlands) Van der Vlist–Van Gestel	21–17	21–15		42–32	Report
30 Jun	13:00	Larissa–Talita (Brazil)	2–0	(Switzerland) Goricanec–Hüberli	21–16	21–15		42–31	Report
30 Jun	14:00	Radarong–Udomchavee (Thailand)	1–2	(Netherlands) Van der Vlist–Van Gestel	18–21	21–16	12–15	51–52	Report

=== Pool C ===
Pos	Team	Pld	W	L	Pts	SW	SL	SR	SPW	SPL	SPR	Qualification
1	(United States) Ross–Walsh	3	3	0	6	6	1	6.000	139	113	1.230	Round of 32
2	(Canada) Bansley–Pavan	3	2	1	5	4	3	1.333	134	131	1.023	Round of 32
3	(Australia) Artacho–Laird	3	1	2	4	3	4	0.750	121	122	0.992	Round of 32
4	(Netherlands) Braakman–Sinnema	3	0	3	3	1	6	0.167	117	145	0.807	

Date	Time		Score		Set 1	Set 2	Set 3	Total	Report
27 Jun	11:00	Bansley–Pavan (Canada)	2–0	(Australia) Artacho–Laird	21–14	21–17		42–31	Report
27 Jun	21:00	Ross–Walsh (United States)	2–0	(Netherlands) Braakman–Sinnema	21–13	22–20		43–33	Report
29 Jun	19:00	Ross–Walsh (United States)	2–1	(Australia) Artacho–Laird	18–21	21–15	15–12	54–48	Report
29 Jun	20:00	Bansley–Pavan (Canada)	2–1	(Netherlands) Braakman–Sinnema	19–21	26–24	15–13	60–58	Report
30 Jun	13:00	Artacho–Laird (Australia)	2–0	(Netherlands) Braakman–Sinnema	21–11	21–15		42–26	Report
30 Jun	14:00	Ross–Walsh (United States)	2–0	(Canada) Bansley–Pavan	21–19	21–13		42–32	Report

=== Pool D ===
Pos	Team	Pld	W	L	Pts	SW	SL	SR	SPW	SPL	SPR	Qualification
1	(Germany) Holtwick–Semmler	3	3	0	6	6	0	MAX	126	92	1.370	Round of 32
2	(Venezuela) Pazo–Agudo	3	2	1	5	4	3	1.333	127	127	1.000	Round of 32
3	(Czech Republic) Bonnerová–Hermannová	3	1	2	4	2	4	0.500	100	106	0.943	
4	(Uruguay) Gómez–Nieto	3	0	3	3	1	6	0.167	114	140	0.814	

Date	Time		Score		Set 1	Set 2	Set 3	Total	Report
27 Jun	15:00	Bonnerová–Hermannová (Czech Republic)	0–2	(Venezuela) Pazo–Agudo	16–21	14–21		30–42	Report
27 Jun	18:00	Holtwick–Semmler (Germany)	2–0	(Uruguay) Gómez–Nieto	21–18	21–17		42–35	Report
28 Jun	19:00	Holtwick–Semmler (Germany)	2–0	(Venezuela) Pazo–Agudo	21–14	21–15		42–29	Report
28 Jun	20:00	Bonnerová–Hermannová (Czech Republic)	2–0	(Uruguay) Gómez–Nieto	21–13	21–11		42–24	Report
29 Jun	18:00	Holtwick–Semmler (Germany)	2–0	(Czech Republic) Bonnerová–Hermannová	21–12	21–16		42–28	Report
29 Jun	21:00	Pazo–Agudo (Venezuela)	2–1	(Uruguay) Gómez–Nieto	18–21	22–20	16–14	56–55	Report

=== Pool E ===
Pos	Team	Pld	W	L	Pts	SW	SL	SR	SPW	SPL	SPR	Qualification
1	(Poland) Kołosińska–Brzostek	3	3	0	6	6	0	MAX	126	89	1.416	Round of 32
2	(Czech Republic) Kolocová–Sluková	3	2	1	5	4	3	1.333	141	114	1.237	Round of 32
3	(Canada) Broder–Valjas	3	1	2	4	3	4	0.750	140	121	1.157	Round of 32
4	(Morocco) Ikram–Mahassine	3	0	3	3	0	6	0.000	43	126	0.341	

Date	Time		Score		Set 1	Set 2	Set 3	Total	Report
27 Jun	11:00	Kołosińska–Brzostek (Poland)	2–0	(Canada) Broder–Valjas	21–18	21–18		42–36	Report
27 Jun	12:00	Kolocová–Sluková (Czech Republic)	2–0	(Morocco) Ikram–Mahassine	21–8	21–2		42–10	Report
28 Jun	15:00	Kolocová–Sluková (Czech Republic)	2–1	(Canada) Broder–Valjas	18–21	31–29	15–12	64–62	Report
28 Jun	18:00	Kołosińska–Brzostek (Poland)	2–0	(Morocco) Ikram–Mahassine	21–8	21–10		42–18	Report
30 Jun	11:00	Kolocová–Sluková (Czech Republic)	0–2	(Poland) Kołosińska–Brzostek	18–21	17–21		35–42	Report
30 Jun	13:00	Broder–Valjas (Canada)	2–0	(Morocco) Ikram–Mahassine	21–8	21–7		42–15	Report

=== Pool F ===
Pos	Team	Pld	W	L	Pts	SW	SL	SR	SPW	SPL	SPR	Qualification
1	(Brazil) Bárbara–Ágatha	3	3	0	6	6	0	MAX	127	92	1.380	Round of 32
2	(United States) Day–Kessy	3	2	1	5	4	2	2.000	114	105	1.086	Round of 32
3	(Cuba) Lianma–Leila	3	1	2	4	2	4	0.500	106	114	0.930	
4	(Mexico) Candelas–Ríos	3	0	3	3	0	6	0.000	90	126	0.714	

Date	Time		Score		Set 1	Set 2	Set 3	Total	Report
27 Jun	16:00	Bárbara–Ágatha (Brazil)	2–0	(Cuba) Lianma–Leila	21–17	23–21		44–38	Report
27 Jun	19:00	Day–Kessy (United States)	2–0	(Mexico) Candelas–Ríos	21–18	21–18		42–36	Report
28 Jun	19:00	Bárbara–Ágatha (Brazil)	2–0	(Mexico) Candelas–Ríos	21–12	21–12		42–24	Report
28 Jun	20:00	Day–Kessy (United States)	2–0	(Cuba) Lianma–Leila	21–13	21–13		42–26	Report
29 Jun	13:00	Candelas–Ríos (Mexico)	0–2	(Cuba) Lianma–Leila	15–21	15–21		30–42	Report
29 Jun	21:00	Bárbara–Ágatha (Brazil)	2–0	(United States) Day–Kessy	22–20	21–10		43–30	Report

=== Pool G ===
Pos	Team	Pld	W	L	Pts	SW	SL	SR	SPW	SPL	SPR	Qualification
1	(Germany) Laboureur–Sude	3	3	0	6	6	2	3.000	150	117	1.282	Round of 32
2	(Brazil) Antonelli–Juliana	2	2	0	4	5	2	2.500	137	89	1.539	Round of 32
3	(Vanuatu) Pata–Matauatu	3	1	2	4	3	4	0.750	118	111	1.063	Round of 32
4	(Algeria) Boucheta–Bayou	3	0	3	3	0	6	0.000	38	126	0.302	

Date	Time		Score		Set 1	Set 2	Set 3	Total	Report
27 Jun	15:00	Laboureur–Sude (Germany)	2–1	(Vanuatu) Pata–Matauatu	21–16	19–21	15–10	55–47	Report
27 Jun	18:00	Antonelli–Juliana (Brazil)	2–0	(Algeria) Boucheta–Bayou	21–7	21–0		42–7	Report
28 Jun	11:00	Laboureur–Sude (Germany)	2–0	(Algeria) Boucheta–Bayou	21–10	21–7		42–17	Report
28 Jun	20:00	Antonelli–Juliana (Brazil)	2–0	(Vanuatu) Pata–Matauatu	21–16	21–13		42–29	Report
29 Jun	13:00	Pata–Matauatu (Vanuatu)	2–0	(Algeria) Boucheta–Bayou	21–4	21–10		42–14	Report
29 Jun	20:00	Antonelli–Juliana (Brazil)	1–2	(Germany) Laboureur–Sude	21–17	19–21	13–15	53–53	Report

=== Pool H ===
Pos	Team	Pld	W	L	Pts	SW	SL	SR	SPW	SPL	SPR	Qualification
1	(Spain) Liliana–Baquerizo	3	3	0	6	6	0	MAX	126	96	1.313	Round of 32
2	(Australia) Bawden–Clancy	3	2	1	5	4	3	1.333	127	94	1.351	Round of 32
3	(Paraguay) Michelle–Filippo	3	1	2	4	3	5	0.600	117	141	0.830	Round of 32
4	(Slovakia) Turnerová–Tomašeková	3	0	3	3	1	6	0.167	100	139	0.719	

Date	Time		Score		Set 1	Set 2	Set 3	Total	Report
27 Jun	15:30	Liliana–Baquerizo (Spain)	2–0	(Slovakia) Turnerová–Tomašeková	21–17	21–15		42–32	Report
27 Jun	17:30	Bawden–Clancy (Australia)	2–1	(Paraguay) Michelle–Filippo	17–21	21–8	15–1	53–30	Report
28 Jun	10:30	Bawden–Clancy (Australia)	2–0	(Slovakia) Turnerová–Tomašeková	21–11	21–11		42–22	Report
28 Jun	14:30	Liliana–Baquerizo (Spain)	2–0	(Paraguay) Michelle–Filippo	21–16	21–16		42–32	Report
30 Jun	11:00	Liliana–Baquerizo (Spain)	2–0	(Australia) Bawden–Clancy	21–13	21–19		42–32	Report
30 Jun	12:00	Michelle–Filippo (Paraguay)	2–1	(Slovakia) Turnerová–Tomašeková	19–21	21–14	15–11	55–46	Report

=== Pool I ===
Pos	Team	Pld	W	L	Pts	SW	SL	SR	SPW	SPL	SPR	Qualification
1	(Brazil) Lima–Fernanda	3	3	0	6	6	0	MAX	132	94	1.404	Round of 32
2	(Switzerland) Forrer–Vergé-Dépré	3	2	1	5	2	2	1.000	129	101	1.277	Round of 32
3	(Switzerland) Zumkehr–Heidrich	3	1	2	4	2	4	0.500	108	104	1.038	
4	(South Africa) Williams–Sekhonyana	3	0	3	3	0	4	0.000	56	126	0.444	

Date	Time		Score		Set 1	Set 2	Set 3	Total	Report
28 Jun	13:30	Zumkehr–Heidrich (Switzerland)	0–2	(Switzerland) Forrer–Vergé-Dépré	20–22	13–21		33–43	Report
28 Jun	20:45	Lima–Fernanda (Brazil)	2–0	(South Africa) Williams–Sekhonyana	21–5	21–12		42–17	Report
29 Jun	12:30	Zumkehr–Heidrich (Switzerland)	2–0	(South Africa) Williams–Sekhonyana	21–11	21–8		42–19	Report
29 Jun	21:45	Lima–Fernanda (Brazil)	2–0	(Switzerland) Forrer–Vergé-Dépré	21–19	27–25		48–44	Report
30 Jun	13:00	Forrer–Vergé-Dépré (Switzerland)	2–0	(South Africa) Williams–Sekhonyana	21–12	21–8		42–20	Report
30 Jun	14:00	Lima–Fernanda (Brazil)	2–0	(Switzerland) Zumkehr–Heidrich	21–14	21–19		42–33	Report

=== Pool J ===
Pos	Team	Pld	W	L	Pts	SW	SL	SR	SPW	SPL	SPR	Qualification
1	(Germany) Borger–Büthe	3	2	1	5	5	2	2.500	142	123	1.154	Round of 32
2	(Russia) Ukolova–Birlova	3	2	1	5	4	2	2.000	117	109	1.073	Round of 32
3	(United States) Fendrick–Sweat	3	2	1	5	4	3	1.333	135	135	1.000	Round of 32
4	(Russia) Prokopeva–Syrtseva	3	0	3	3	0	6	0.000	99	126	0.786	

Date	Time		Score		Set 1	Set 2	Set 3	Total	Report
28 Jun	12:00	Ukolova–Birlova (Russia)	2–0	(Russia) Prokopeva–Syrtseva	21–14	21–18		42–32	Report
28 Jun	15:00	Borger–Büthe (Germany)	1–2	(United States) Fendrick–Sweat	21–17	19–21	18–20	58–58	Report
29 Jun	14:00	Borger–Büthe (Germany)	2–0	(Russia) Prokopeva–Syrtseva	21–16	21–16		42–32	Report
29 Jun	15:00	Fendrick–Sweat (United States)	0–2	(Russia) Ukolova–Birlova	16–21	19–21		35–42	Report
30 Jun	11:00	Fendrick–Sweat (United States)	2–0	(Russia) Prokopeva–Syrtseva	21–19	21–16		42–35	Report
30 Jun	12:00	Borger–Büthe (Germany)	2–0	(Russia) Ukolova–Birlova	21–14	21–19		42–33	Report

=== Pool K ===
Pos	Team	Pld	W	L	Pts	SW	SL	SR	SPW	SPL	SPR	Qualification
1	(Slovakia) Dubovcová–Nestarcová	3	3	0	6	6	2	3.000	151	122	1.238	Round of 32
2	(Germany) Ludwig–Walkenhorst	3	2	1	5	5	2	2.500	129	95	1.358	Round of 32
3	(Poland) Baran–Gruszczyńska	3	1	2	4	3	5	0.600	135	151	0.894	Round of 32
4	(Costa Rica) Charles–Alfaro	3	0	3	3	1	6	0.167	94	141	0.667	

Date	Time		Score		Set 1	Set 2	Set 3	Total	Report
28 Jun	14:00	Dubovcová–Nestarcová (Slovakia)	2–1	(Poland) Baran–Gruszczyńska	21–14	20–22	19–17	60–53	Report
28 Jun	15:00	Ludwig–Walkenhorst (Germany)	2–0	(Costa Rica) Charles–Alfaro	21–9	21–12		42–21	Report
29 Jun	10:00	Ludwig–Walkenhorst (Germany)	2–0	(Poland) Baran–Gruszczyńska	21–13	21–12		42–25	Report
29 Jun	11:00	Dubovcová–Nestarcová (Slovakia)	2–0	(Costa Rica) Charles–Alfaro	21–17	21–7		42–24	Report
30 Jun	11:00	Baran–Gruszczyńska (Poland)	2–1	(Costa Rica) Charles–Alfaro	21–17	21–23	15–9	57–49	Report
30 Jun	12:00	Ludwig–Walkenhorst (Germany)	1–2	(Slovakia) Dubovcová–Nestarcová	15–21	21–13	9–15	45–49	Report

=== Pool L ===
Pos	Team	Pld	W	L	Pts	SW	SL	SR	SPW	SPL	SPR	Qualification
1	(Italy) Menegatti–Orsi Toth	3	3	0	6	6	2	3.000	145	123	1.179	Round of 32
2	(China) Wang–Yue	3	2	1	5	5	2	2.500	133	125	1.064	Round of 32
3	(Netherlands) Remmers–Stiekema	3	1	2	4	2	4	0.500	105	116	0.905	
4	(Argentina) Gallay–Klug	3	0	3	3	1	6	0.167	118	137	0.861	

Date	Time		Score		Set 1	Set 2	Set 3	Total	Report
28 Jun	14:00	Wang–Yue (China)	2–0	(Netherlands) Remmers–Stiekema	21–17	21–19		42–36	Report
28 Jun	16:00	Menegatti–Orsi Toth (Italy)	2–1	(Argentina) Gallay–Klug	15–21	21–19	15–9	51–49	Report
29 Jun	13:00	Menegatti–Orsi Toth (Italy)	2–0	(Netherlands) Remmers–Stiekema	21–13	21–14		42–27	Report
29 Jun	15:00	Wang–Yue (China)	2–0	(Argentina) Gallay–Klug	23–21	21–16		44–37	Report
30 Jun	12:00	Gallay–Klug (Argentina)	0–2	(Netherlands) Remmers–Stiekema	18–21	14–21		32–42	Report
30 Jun	14:00	Wang–Yue (China)	1–2	(Italy) Menegatti–Orsi Toth	21–16	14–21	12–15	47–52	Report

=== 3rd place ranked teams ===
The eight best third-placed teams advanced to the round of 32.

Pos	Team	Pld	W	L	Pts	SW	SL	SR	SPW	SPL	SPR	Qualification
1	(United States) Fendrick–Sweat	3	2	1	5	4	3	1.333	135	135	1.000	Round of 32
2	(Kazakhstan) Mashkova–Tsimbalova	3	1	2	4	4	4	1.000	153	126	1.214	Round of 32
3	(Canada) Broder–Valjas	3	1	2	4	3	4	0.750	140	121	1.157	Round of 32
4	(Vanuatu) Pata–Matauatu	3	1	2	4	3	4	0.750	118	111	1.063	Round of 32
5	(Australia) Artacho–Laird	3	1	2	4	3	4	0.750	121	122	0.992	Round of 32
6	(Poland) Baran–Gruszczyńska	3	1	2	4	3	5	0.600	135	151	0.894	Round of 32
7	(Paraguay) Michelle–Filippo	3	1	2	4	3	5	0.600	117	141	0.830	Round of 32
8	(Netherlands) Van der Vlist–Van Gestel	3	1	2	4	3	5	0.600	121	147	0.823	Round of 32
9	(Switzerland) Zumkehr–Heidrich	3	1	2	4	2	4	0.500	108	104	1.038	
10	(Czech Republic) Bonnerová–Hermannová	3	1	2	4	2	4	0.500	100	106	0.943	
11	(Cuba) Lianma–Leila	3	1	2	4	2	4	0.500	106	114	0.930	
12	(Netherlands) Remmers–Stiekema	3	1	2	4	2	4	0.500	105	116	0.905	

== Knockout stage ==
A draw was held to determine the pairings.

=== Round of 32 ===
Date	Time		Score		Set 1	Set 2	Set 3	Total	Report
1 Jul	12:00	Menegatti–Orsi Toth (Italy)	2–0	(Czech Republic) Kolocová–Sluková	21–19	21–18		42–37	Report
1 Jul	12:00	Dubovcová–Nestarcová (Slovakia)	0–2	(Canada) Humana-Paredes–Pischke	22–24	15–21		37–45	Report
1 Jul	12:00	Laboureur–Sude (Germany)	0–2	(Kazakhstan) Mashkova–Tsimbalova	18–21	14–21		32–42	Report
1 Jul	12:30	Lima–Fernanda (Brazil)	2–0	(Venezuela) Pazo–Agudo	21–12	21–14		42–26	Report
1 Jul	13:00	Kołosińska–Brzostek (Poland)	1–2	(United States) Fendrick–Sweat	24–22	8–21	10–15	42–58	Report
1 Jul	13:00	Bárbara–Ágatha (Brazil)	2–1	(Canada) Broder–Valjas	14–21	21–16	15–7	50–44	Report
1 Jul	13:00	Borger–Büthe (Germany)	1–2	(Canada) Bansley–Pavan	13–21	21–19	13–15	47–55	Report
1 Jul	13:30	Forrer–Vergé-Dépré (Switzerland)	0–2	(Australia) Bawden–Clancy	18–21	14–21		32–42	Report
1 Jul	14:00	Van Gestel–Van der Vlist (Netherlands)	0–2	(Germany) Holtwick–Semmler	17–21	21–23		38–44	Report
1 Jul	14:00	Ross–Walsh (United States)	2–0	(Paraguay) Michelle–Filippo	21–6	21–10		42–16	Report
1 Jul	14:00	Antonelli–Juliana (Brazil)	2–1	(Switzerland) Goricanec–Hüberli	18–21	21–18	15–9	54–48	Report
1 Jul	14:30	Liliana–Baquerizo (Spain)	2–0	(Vanuatu) Pata–Matauatu	21–19	23–21		44–40	Report
1 Jul	15:00	Ludwig–Walkenhorst (Germany)	0–2	(Russia) Ukolova–Birlova	16–21	16–21		32–42	Report
1 Jul	15:00	Wang–Yue (China)	2–0	(United States) Day–Kessy	21–19	21–18		42–37	Report
1 Jul	15:00	Artacho–Laird (Australia)	0–2	(Brazil) Larissa–Talita	18–21	17–21		35–42	Report
1 Jul	15:30	Meppelink–Van Iersel (Netherlands)	2–0	(Poland) Baran–Gruszczyńska	21–12	21–19		42–31	Report

=== Round of 16 ===
Date	Time		Score		Set 1	Set 2	Set 3	Total	Report
2 Jul	12:00	Ukolova–Birlova (Russia)	0–2	(Germany) Holtwick–Semmler	18–21	22–24		40–45	Report
2 Jul	12:30	Lima–Fernanda (Brazil)	2–0	(Spain) Liliana–Baquerizo	21–17	21–19		42–36	Report
2 Jul	13:00	Fendrick–Sweat (United States)	2–0	(Italy) Menegatti–Orsi Toth	21–18	21–19		42–37	Report
2 Jul	13:30	Meppelink–Van Iersel (Netherlands)	1–2	(Australia) Bawden–Clancy	22–24	21–16	12–15	55–55	Report
2 Jul	14:00	Humana-Paredes–Pischke (Canada)	0–2	(Brazil) Bárbara–Ágatha	15–21	14–21		29–42	Report
2 Jul	14:00	Mashkova–Tsimbalova (Kazakhstan)	0–2	(Canada) Bansley–Pavan	15–21	10–21		25–42	Report
2 Jul	15:00	Ross–Walsh (United States)	1–2	(China) Wang–Yue	19–21	21–17	13–15	53–53	Report
2 Jul	15:00	Antonelli–Juliana (Brazil)	2–1	(Brazil) Larissa–Talita	19–21	21–18	15–13	55–52	Report

=== Quarterfinals ===
Date	Time		Score		Set 1	Set 2	Set 3	Total	Report
2 Jul	19:00	Fendrick–Sweat (United States)	0–2	(Germany) Holtwick–Semmler	18–21	15–21		33–42	Report
2 Jul	19:45	Bawden–Clancy (Australia)	1–2	(Brazil) Lima–Fernanda	21–15	16–21	16–18	53–54	Report
2 Jul	20:00	Wang–Yue (China)	0–2	(Brazil) Bárbara–Ágatha	18–21	21–23		39–44	Report
2 Jul	20:00	Bansley–Pavan (Canada)	0–2	(Brazil) Antonelli–Juliana	23–25	18–21		41–46	Report

=== Semifinals ===
Date	Time		Score		Set 1	Set 2	Set 3	Total	Report
3 Jul	19:45	Lima–Fernanda (Brazil)	2–0	(Germany) Holtwick–Semmler	21–12	21–15		42–37	Report
3 Jul	20:45	Bárbara–Ágatha (Brazil)	2–0	(Brazil) Antonelli–Juliana	24–22	21–19		45–41	Report

=== Third place game ===
Date	Time		Score		Set 1	Set 2	Set 3	Total	Report
4 Jul	20:00	Holtwick–Semmler (Germany)	1–2	(Brazil) Antonelli–Juliana	25–23	18–21	9–15	52–59	Report

=== Final ===
Date	Time		Score		Set 1	Set 2	Set 3	Total	Report
4 Jul	21:00	Lima–Fernanda (Brazil)	0–2	(Brazil) Bárbara–Ágatha	18–21	20–22		38–43	Report
