= Karen Cope =

Costa Rican volleyball player

Personal information
- Full name: Karen Cope Charles
- Nickname: La Negra
- Born: November 6, 1985 (age 40); San Jose, San Jose Province, Costa Rica
- Hometown: San José, Costa Rica
- Height: 1.73 m (5 ft 8 in)
- Weight: 55 kg (121 lb)
- Spike: 315 cm (124 in)
- Block: 297 cm (117 in)

Beach volleyball information

Current teammate
Years	Teammate
2016	Nathalia Alfaro

Previous teammates
Years	Teammate
2013	Marianela Alfaro
Honours
Women's volleyball
Representing Costa Rica
Central American and Caribbean Games
Bronze medal – third place	2010 Mayagüez	Team
- Last updated: January 2017

Karen Cope Charles (born November 6, 1985, in El Limón) is a beach volleyball and volleyball player from Costa Rica who played the 2006 and 2010 FIVB indoor World Championships and the 2015 World Championships and the 2016 Summer Olympics in beach volleyball.

== Personal and early life ==
Cope is 173 cm (5 ft 8 in) tall 55 kilograms (121 lb), born as Karen Cope Charles on June 11, 1985, in Limón, Limón Province, Costa Rica. She is the daughter of Stwart Cope a former basketball player, and Brenda Charles Clark, now-deceased, who is former sports educator and national record holder in track and field. She have an older sister named Karen and a little brother named Carlton.

As an Afro-Costa Rican, she expressed along with boxer Hanna Gabriel pride in her roots, backing and celebrating the Day of the Black Person and Afro-Costa Rican Culture.

== Career ==
=== 2006 ===
Kope played the Pan-AmericanCup, reaching the eleventh place and the seventh place during the 2006 Central American and Caribbean Games, where most of the Costa Rican athletes had to cover their own expenses, including the entire volleyball team.

After playing the TV Azteca Women's Stars tournament, she made the selection for the 2006 FIVB World Championship, appointed for jumping ability and considered one of the team's top players. The Costa Rica national team, then ranked No.33, lost 0–3 in their World Championships debut to Korea in spite of Cope's team resistance, and many defensive mistakes. 0–3 to Japan to worsen 0–2 in the pool A ranking and finally, her national team won their first ever set, but losing 1–3 to Poland, even when Cope was a highlight because of her jumping abilities and spike, while losing their third match. They beat Kenya in a 3–2 comeback, the first ever win for her national team in the World Championships, they thanked the audience support while their captain admitted their better concentration through the match as one of the key roles for the win. After they lost to Chinese Taipei 0-3 they were eliminated in the first round of the championship, finally ranking tied-17th.

While playing World Championship, she signed with the Swedish club EVS Engelholm Volleyball Sallskap, with plans to play professional volleyball and study. She got that through the Costa Rica National team advisor, Canadian Lorne Sawula, who sent a video to Sweden. She played the 2006/2007 CEV Top Teams Cup, and helped her team to reach the continental cup semifinals and the local league second place.

=== 2007 ===
When she finished her season with the Swedish team, she returned to Costa Rica to play with the local University of Costa Rica. She also announced her singing with the Swiss club Kanti Schaffhausen.

She then played the Pan-American Cup where her team played without any preparation games. Her team lost the seventh place match game against Peru, besides Cope's 14 points. And later went to Rio de Janeiro, Brazil to play the volleyball tournament of the Pan American Games. Besides being the top or second best scorer for her team, they lost 0–3 to the Dominican Republic and 2–3 to Mexico, ending her participation in eighth place.

=== 2008 ===
Cope played the 2007-08 CEV Challenge Cup season with her Swiss team and lost to Romanian Dinamo Romprest Bucuresti in the third round.

During the 2008–09 CEV Cup With Kanti Schaffhausen, they defeated the Croatian OTP Banka Pula 3–0 and 3–0 in the 1/16 round and later to the Portuguese Clube Desportivo Ribeirense 2–3 and 3–0. Before falling to the German Rote Raben Vilsbiburg in the quarterfinals in January 2009.

=== 2009 ===
Kanti Schaffhausen was unable to achieve their first championship being defeated by Volley Köniz, after Kope suffered a season-ending injury that her club could not overcome, winning anyway the Swiss cup. When she returned from Switzerland, she was called to the national team who was scheduled to play the 2010 FIVB World Championship NORCECA qualification tournament with lack of warm up games. The only warn up was the Pan-American Cup were her team ranked eight after only advancing to the 5-8 position round after the pool play, and losing to Argentina and Canada. After the Pan American Cup, her national team traveled to Orlando, Florida to play the 2010 FIVB World Championship NORCECA qualification tournament.

=== 2012 ===
Cope signed with the Puerto Rican club Valencianas de Juncos as the first Costa Rican to play in the Puerto Rican League. Besides the support she gave for the team along the season, she was released on 27 February 2012 when her team was in eighth place to make room for the American Blair Brown. She then returned to Costa Rica to play with San José Bio Gel winning her second Costa Rican championship, the Opening Tournament. She then traveled to Mexico to play the NORCECA Olympic qualification and her team reached the quarterfinals, but only managed to claim the sixth place, not qualifying for the 2012 Summer Olympics.

In July she played the Pan-American Cup and after losing to Canada in the 5-8 qualification round, her team only ranked in the ninth place. But she later found herself with an unknown injury that kept her out of the court. But in December, she played the Costa Rican Closing tournament with San José Bio Gel, leading the team to their second straight championship being awarded Most Valuable player. She dedicated that triumph to her deceased mother and confessed that she was planning to share her time either to play indoor volleyball abroad with an attractive contract or a new career in beach volleyball and study veterinary medicine.

=== 2015 ===
She won the Central American Beach Volleyball from the NORCECA Beach Volleyball Continental Cup, beating Guatemalans Maria Jose Orellana and Maria Andrea Orellana. In March they were announced as one of the 48 teams that were going to compete in the World Championship, as the first ever Costa Rican representatives in the World Championship. With this joy, they won in April the Costa Rican Beach Volleyball national championship for the second time. She then played the Cayman Islands stop from the NORCECA Beach Volleyball Tour, finishing in the fifth place.

In June, she played the Ocean City stop of the National Beach Volleyball League in the United States, with the Costa Rica Olympic Committee backup, winning the bronze medal and using this tournament to improve the blocking and the service effectiveness. Playing in Puerto Cortés, Honduras, Cope and Alfaro claimed the Central American Championship.

Playing in the 2015 Beach Volleyball World Championships, in their first match, they lost 0–2 to the German representatives, 0–2 to the Slovaks, and finally 1–2 to the Poland team. After her participation, Cope defined playing with the score and improve the closing as the key points for their next competitions and also thanked the support and motivation from Costa Rica during the World Championship.

She then traveled to Toronto, Canada to play the 2015 Pan American Games, beating the Chileans 2–1, before an easy 30 minutes win 2–0 to the Nicaraguans, and finished the pool play with a 1–2 loss to the Brazilian team. They defeated 2–0 to the Mexicans in the elimination round but lost 0–2 in the quarterfinals round to the Canadians, and 0-2 the Colombian Galindo sisters and ending their Pan American Games participation in the eighth place when they lost 0–2 to Uruguay.

In October she won the NORCECA Beach Volleyball Tour silver medal in Saint Lucia when she lost 0–3 to the Americans Irene Hester and Caitlin Ledoux the gold medal match.

=== 2016 ===
The Costa Rican Institute for Sports and Recreation granted Kope a C$1,500,000 (Costa Rican Colones)—approximately US$2,830 in March 2016— annual scholarship.

Togegther with Marcela Araya and Valeria Valenciano the duo of Alfaro and Cope qualified for the 2016 Summer Olympics by winning the NORCECA Continental Cup, first time ever in beach volleyball for their home country. The knowledge of each other and a solid friendship was the foundation to achieve the Olympic berth, she also defined that moment as the result of teamwork and achieving the highest point in her sport career. The team was one of 10 Costa Rica representatives to the games. They lost their first match 0–2 to Australia, 0–2 to Netherlands in the second match.

== Clubs ==
- (Sweden) Engelholm VS (2006–2007)
- Universidad de Costa Rica (2007)
- (Switzerland) Kanti Schaffhausen (2007–2009)
- (Austria) SVS Post Schwechat (2009–2010)
- Universidad de Costa Rica (2010)
- (Chile) Boston College (2011)
- (Puerto Rico) Valencianas de Juncos (2012)
- (Costa Rica) San José Bio Gel (2012)

== Awards ==
=== Individuals ===
- 2011 Chilean League "Best Spiker"
- 2012 Costa Rican League "Most Valuable Player"

=== Clubs ===
- 2006-07 Swedish League - Runner-Up, with Engelholm VS
- 2007-08 Swiss League - Runner-Up, with Kanti Schaffhausen
- 2008 Swiss Supercup - Champion, with Kanti Schaffhausen
- 2008-09 Swiss League - Runner-Up, with Kanti Schaffhausen
- 2008-09 Swiss Cup - Champion, with Kanti Schaffhausen
- 2010 Costa Rican League - Champion, with Universidad de Costa Rica
- 2011 Chilean League Super-4 - Champion, with Boston College
- 2012 Costa Rican League - Champion, with San José Bio Gel
