= Rebecca Pavan =

Canadian volleyball player (born 1990)

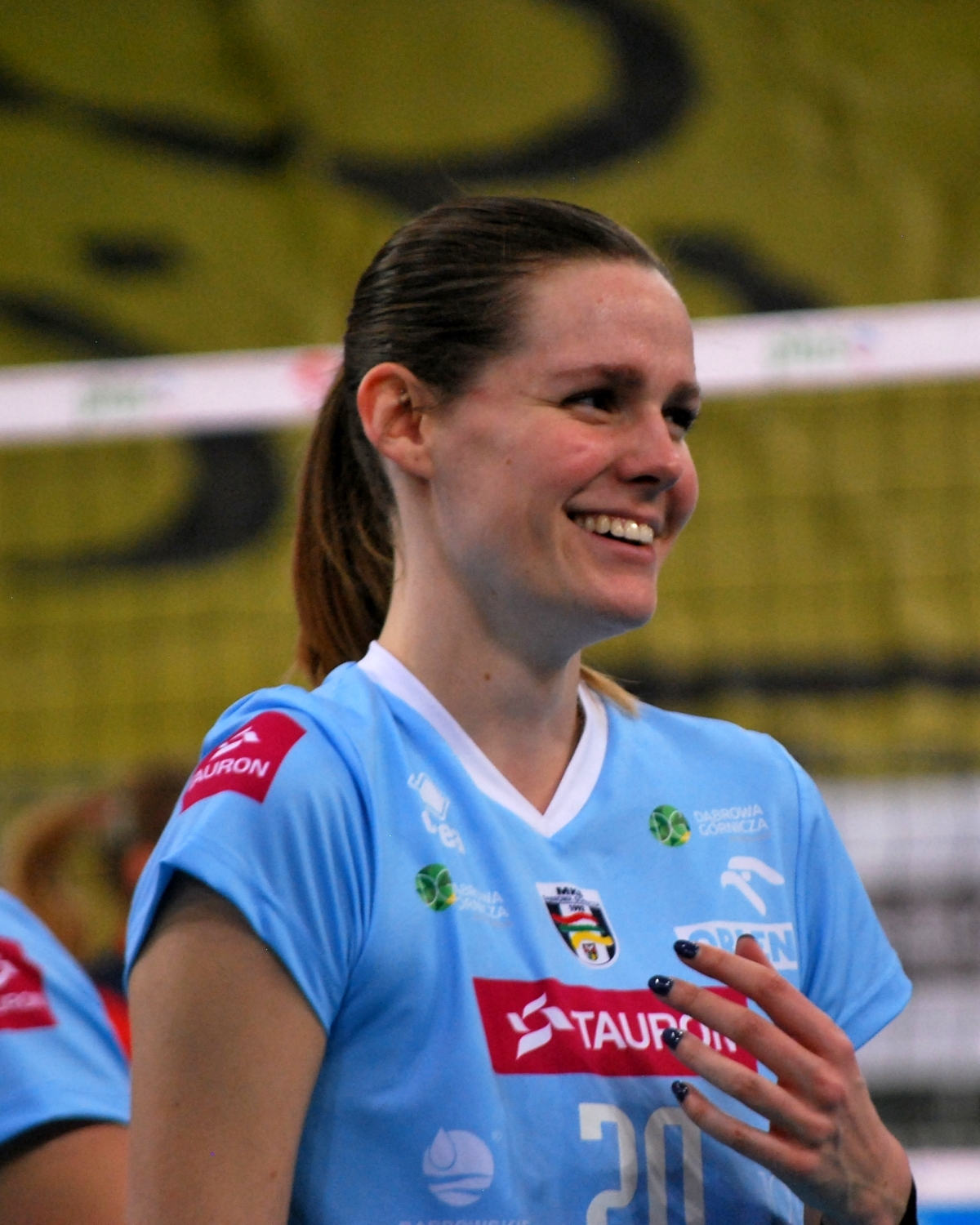

Personal information
- Nickname: Becky
- Nationality: Canadian
- Born: 17 April 1990 (age 36); Kitchener, Ontario
- Height: 1.92 m (6 ft 4 in)
- Spike: 314 cm (124 in)
- Block: 300 cm (120 in)
- Education: University of Kentucky

Career
| Years | Teams |
|---|---|
| 2013-14; 2014-15; 2015-16 | (Germany) VC Stuttgart (France) Béziers Volley (Poland) MKS Dąbrowa Górnicza |

National team
| Canada |

Rebecca Ann Pavan (born 17 April 1990) is a Canadian retired female volleyball player. She was a member of the Canada women's national volleyball team and played for MKS Dąbrowa Górnicza in 2016. She was part of the Canadian national team at the 2014 FIVB Volleyball Women's World Championship in Italy. Pavan played collegiate volleyball at the University of Kentucky. Her older sister is fellow volleyball player Sarah Pavan.
