= Ágatha Bednarczuk =

Brazilian beach volleyball player (born 1983)

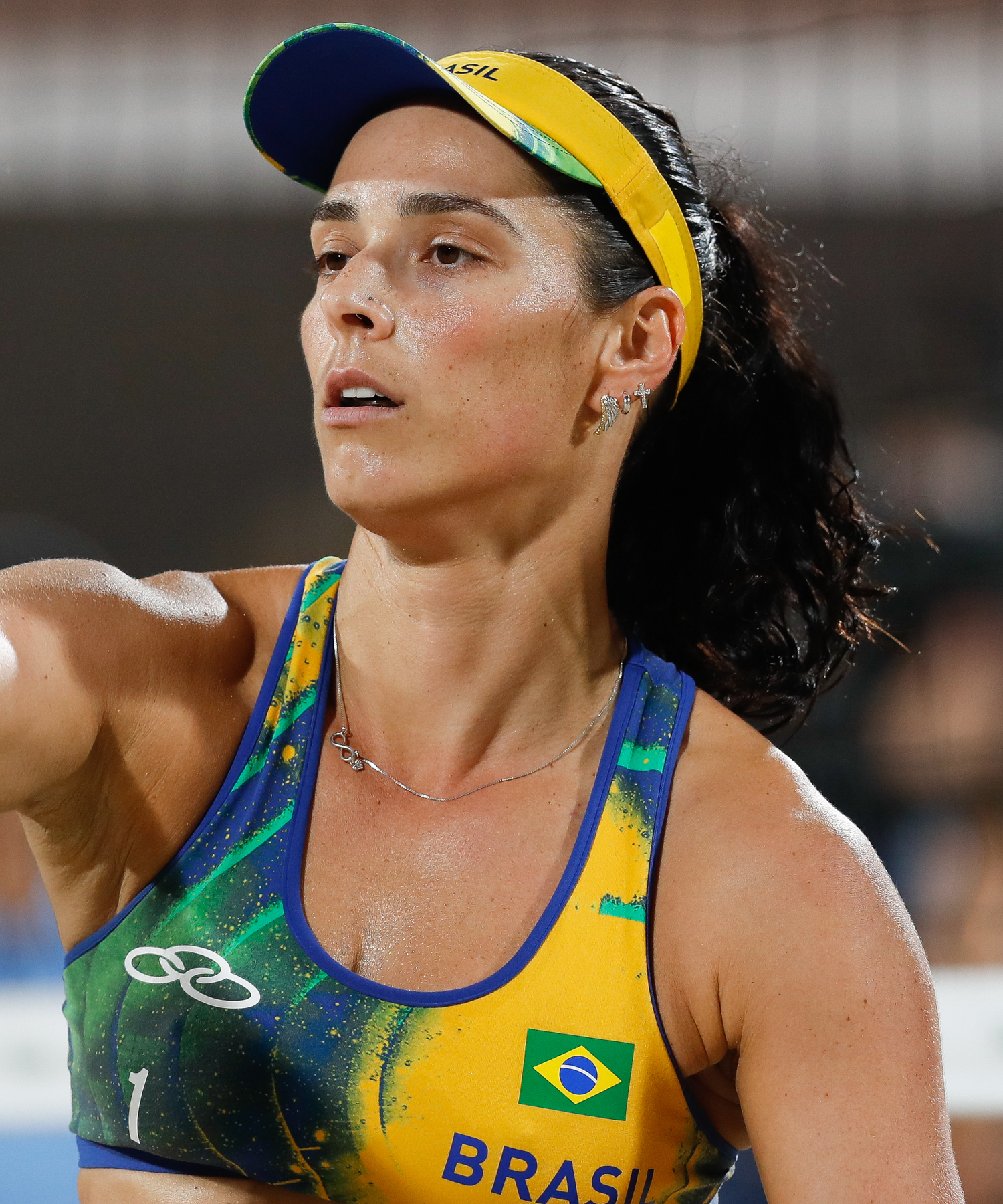
- Bednarczuk at the 2016 Summer Olympics

Personal information
- Full name: Ágatha Bednarczuk Rippel
- Nationality: Brazilian
- Born: 22 June 1983 (age 43)
- Home town: Curitiba, Brazil
- Height: 1.82 m (6 ft 0 in)
- Weight: 70 kg (154 lb)
Beach volleyball information
Current teammate
- Years: Teammate
- 2023–present: Rebecca Cavalcante
Previous teammates
- Years: Teammate
- 2005 2006–2008 2010 2013 2012, 2014–2017 2017–2021: Sandra Pires; Shaylyn Bede; Raquel Pellucci; Maria Antonelli; Bárbara Seixas; Duda Lisboa
Honours
Women's beach volleyball
Representing Brazil
Olympic Games
Silver medal – second place	2016 Rio de Janeiro	Beach
World Championships
Gold medal – first place	2015 The Hague	Beach
Universiade
Bronze medal – third place	2011 Shenzhen	Beach

Ágatha Bednarczuk Rippel (born 22 June 1983), frequently referred to as just Ágatha, is a Brazilian international beach volleyball player, playing as a blocker. She won the gold medal at the 2015 World Championships, as well as a silver medal at the 2016 Summer Olympics, alongside her teammate Bárbara Seixas.

== Biography ==
Born in Curitiba to Maria José Vagnoni Moscardi and Alfredo Bednarczuk, Bednarczuk is of Polish and Italian ancestry. She started competing in the city of Paranaguá, and became famous after competing at the 2005 Beach Volleyball World Championships. She was part of the Swatch FIVB World Tour 2008 and 2012. Bednarczuk also competed at the 2013 Beach Volleyball World Championships and was on the 2014 FIVB Beach Volleyball World Tour. She won the gold medal at the 2015 World Championships alongside her teammate Bárbara Seixas. This qualified her to represent Brazil at the 2016 Summer Olympics.

=== Olympics ===
Ágatha and her partner Bárbara beat Kerri Walsh-Jennings and April Ross of United States, in straight sets of (22–20), (21–18) in the 2016 Rio Olympic semifinal. The pair then lost to Germany's Laura Ludwig and Kira Walkenhorst.
