= 2015 Beach Volleyball World Championships =

2017 World Championship
- Location: The Hague; Amsterdam; Rotterdam; Apeldoorn, Netherlands
- Dates: 26 June – 5 July
- Website: Official website

Champions
- Men: Brazil; Alison Cerutti; Bruno Oscar Schmidt
- Women: Brazil; Bárbara Seixas; Ágatha Bednarczuk

The 2015 FIVB Beach Volleyball World Championships were staged from 26 June to 5 July 2015 in The Hague, Amsterdam, Rotterdam, and Apeldoorn, Netherlands. The FIVB Beach Volleyball World Championships are organized every two years and Netherlands hosted the event for the first time. 48 teams per gender entered the competition making 96 total. The winners of the event qualified for the 2016 Summer Olympics.

== Venues ==
Pool A, H, I, Final round	Pool B, G, J, Quarterfinal	Pool C, F, K, Quarterfinal	Pool D, E, L, Quarterfinal
(Netherlands) The Hague	(Netherlands) Amsterdam	(Netherlands) Apeldoorn	(Netherlands) Rotterdam
Hofvijver	Dam Square	Market Square	SS Rotterdam
Capacity: 5,500	Capacity: 2,000	Capacity: 2,000	Capacity: 2,000

== Medal summary ==
=== Medal table ===
Rank	Nation	Gold	Silver	Bronze	Total
1	Brazil (BRA)	2	1	2	5
2	Netherlands (NED)	0	1	0	1
Totals (2 entries)		2	2	2	6

=== Medal events ===
Event	Gold	Silver	Bronze
Men	Alison Cerutti and Bruno Schmidt (BRA)	Reinder Nummerdor and Christiaan Varenhorst (NED)	Pedro Solberg and Evandro Oliveira (BRA)
Women	Bárbara Seixas and Ágatha Bednarczuk (BRA)	Taiana Lima and Fernanda Alves (BRA)	Maria Antonelli and Juliana Silva (BRA)
