= Claudia Ríos =

Mexican volleyball player

Personal information
- Nationality: Mexico
- Born: 22 September 1992 (age 34); Ciudad Victoria
- Height: 1.74 m (5 ft 9 in)
- Weight: 54 kg (119 lb)
- Spike: 282 cm (111 in)
- Block: 262 cm (103 in)

Volleyball information
- Number: 14

Career
Years	Teams
2014	(Mexico) Tamaulipas

Claudia Ríos (born 22 September 1992) is a Mexican female volleyball player. She is a member of the Mexico women's national volleyball team and played for Tamaulipas in 2014.

She was part of the Mexico national team at the 2014 FIVB Volleyball Women's World Championship in Italy.

== Clubs ==
- (Mexico) Tamaulipas (2014)
