= Juliana Silva =

Brazilian beach volleyball player (born 1983)

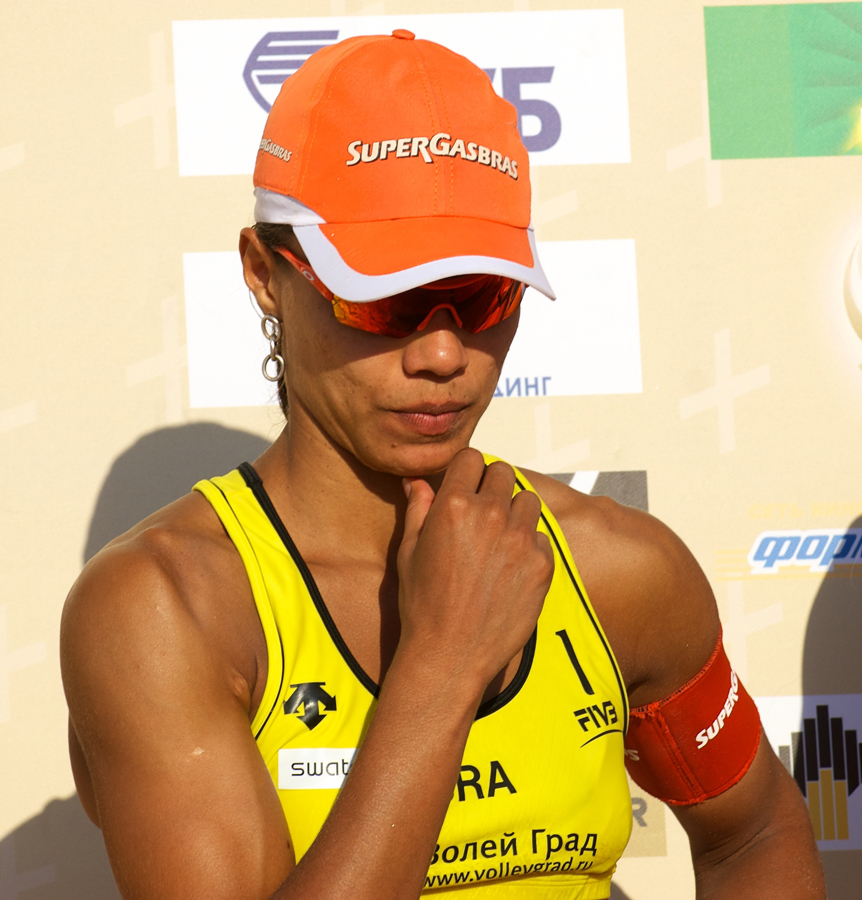
- Silva at the Grand Slam Moscow 2011

Personal information
- Full name: Juliana Felisberta da Silva
- Nickname: Juliana Felisberta
- Born: July 22, 1983 (age 43); Santos, Brazil
- Height: 5 ft 10 in (178 cm)

Beach volleyball information

Current teammate
Teammate
Maria Antonelli
Honours
Women's beach volleyball
Representing Brazil
Olympic Games
Bronze medal – third place	2012 London	Beach
World Championships
Gold medal – first place	2011 Rome	Beach
Silver medal – second place	2005 Berlin	Beach
Silver medal – second place	2009 Stavanger	Beach
Bronze medal – third place	2007 Gstaad	Beach
Bronze medal – third place	2015 The Hague	Beach
Pan American Games
Gold medal – first place	2007 Rio de Janeiro	Beach
Gold medal – first place	2011 Guadalajara	Beach

Juliana Felisberta da Silva (born 22 July 1983) is a Brazilian female beach volleyball player who won the silver medal in the women's beach team competition at the 2005 Beach Volleyball World Championships in Berlin, Germany and the 2009 Beach Volleyball World Championships in Stavanger, Norway, partnering with Larissa França. At the 2011 Beach Volleyball World Championships, they won the gold medal. At the 2012 Summer Olympics, they won the bronze medal.

== Playing partners ==
- Larissa França
- Jackie Silva
- Maria Antonelli

Sporting positions
Preceded by Adriana Behar and Shelda Bede (BRA)	Women's FIVB Beach World Tour Winner alongside (Brazil) Larissa França; 2005–2007	Succeeded by Ana Paula Connelly and Shelda Bede (BRA)
Preceded by Ana Paula Connelly and Shelda Bede (BRA)	Women's FIVB Beach World Tour Winner alongside (Brazil) Larissa França; 2009–2012	Succeeded by Talita Antunes and Taiana Lima (BRA)
Preceded by Talita Antunes and Taiana Lima (BRA)	Women's FIVB Beach World Tour Winner alongside (Brazil) Maria Antonelli; 2014	Succeeded by Talita Antunes and Larissa França (BRA)
Awards
Preceded by Kerri Walsh (USA)	Women's FIVB World Tour "Best Blocker"; 2009–2010	Succeeded by Kerri Walsh (USA)
Preceded by April Ross (USA)	Women's FIVB World Tour "Best Attacker"; 2010	Succeeded by Laura Ludwig (GER)
Preceded by Laura Ludwig (GER)	Women's FIVB World Tour "Best Attacker"; 2012	Succeeded by Talita Antunes (BRA)
Preceded by Misty May-Treanor (USA); Zhang Xi (CHN)	Women's FIVB World Tour "Most Outstanding"; 2009–2011	Succeeded by Kerri Walsh (USA)
Preceded by Misty May-Treanor (USA)	Women's FIVB World Tour "Sportsperson"; 2011	Succeeded by Kerri Walsh (USA)
Preceded by Taiana Lima (BRA)	Women's FIVB World Tour "Sportsperson"; 2014	Succeeded by Laura Ludwig (GER)
Preceded by Inaugural	Women's FIVB World Tour "Team of the Year" alongside (Brazil) Larissa França; 2005–2007	Succeeded by Ana Paula Connelly and Shelda Bede (BRA)
Preceded by Ana Paula Connelly and Shelda Bede (BRA)	Women's FIVB World Tour "Team of the Year" alongside (Brazil) Larissa França; 2009–2012	Succeeded by Talita Antunes and Taiana Lima (BRA)
Preceded by Talita Antunes and Taiana Lima (BRA)	Women's FIVB World Tour "Team of the Year" alongside (Brazil) Maria Antonelli; 2014	Succeeded by Talita Antunes and Larissa França (BRA)
