= Nadine Zumkehr =

Swiss beach volleyball player

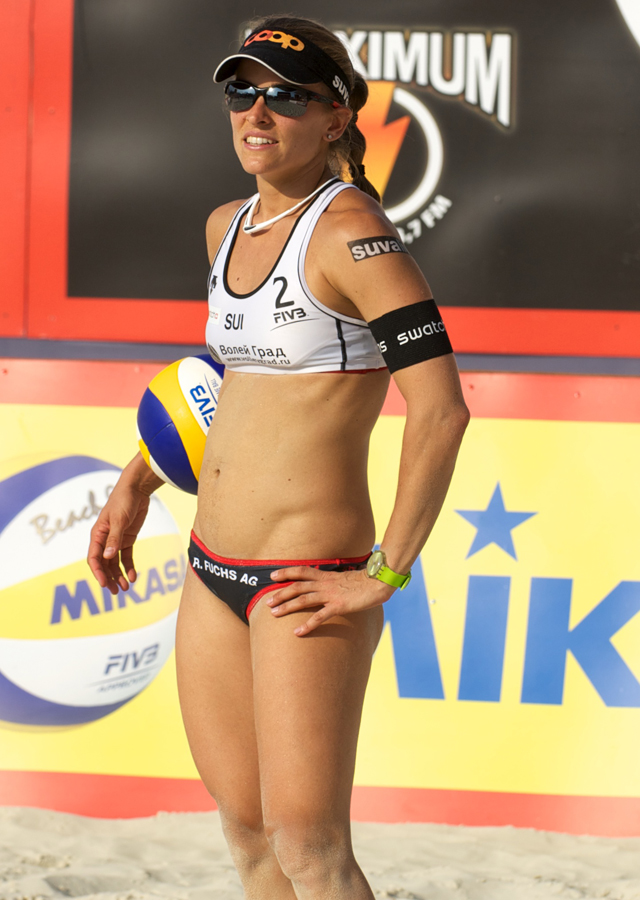
- Zumkehr in 2011

Personal information
- Nationality: Swiss
- Born: 5 February 1985 (age 41); Frutigen, Switzerland
- Height: 172 cm (5 ft 8 in)
- Weight: 65 kg (143 lb)

Beach volleyball information

Current teammate
Teammate
Joana Heidrich

Previous teammates
Years	Teammate
2013-16	Joana Heidrich

National team
Switzerland
Honours
Women's volleyball
Representing Switzerland
FIVB Beach Volleyball World Tour
Silver medal – second place	2016 Toronto	Beach

Nadine Zumkehr (born 5 February 1985) is a Swiss beach volleyball player. As of 2012, she played with Simone Kuhn. The pair participated in the 2012 Summer Olympics tournament and were eliminated in the round of 16 by the American pair of Jennifer Kessy and April Ross who went on to win silver.

== Professional career ==
As of 2013 she now plays with Joana Heidrich. The pair participated in the 2016 summer Olympics in Rio with a 14th seed, as of 12 June 2016, placement. They lost against Brazil's #1 seed team of Talita Antunes and Larissa Franca in a nail biting match of 3 sets (21–23, 27–25, 15–13), which was also the longest match at Rio, in the quarter-final Played 14 August 2016.

Zumkehr played her last Beach Volleyball game at the Toronto World Finals and will retire.

== World tour 2016 ==
She is competing at the World Tour finals in Toronto. The pair played against fellow country mates of Isabelle Forrer and Anouk Verge-Depre and won in 3 sets of (14–21, 21–15, 15–10). The pair advanced to Gold medal match against Germany's Olympic Gold medalists of Laura Ludwig and Kira Walkenhorst. They lost to the German's in straight sets of (18–21, 16–21) and finish with silver medal.

Awards
Preceded by Pata Miller (VAN)	Women's FIVB World Tour "Most Inspirational"; 2016	Succeeded by Laura Ludwig (GER)
