= Jantine van der Vlist =

Dutch volleyball player (born 1985)

Personal information
- Nationality: Dutch
- Born: 30 October 1985 (age 41); Wageningen, Netherlands

Beach volleyball information

Current teammate
Years	Teammate
2015-	Sophie van Gestel

Previous teammates
Years	Teammate
2013-14; 2013	Rimke Braakma; Marloes Wesselink

National team
Netherlands

Jantine van der Vlist (born 30 October 1985) is a Dutch beach volleyball player. She has previously played indoor volleyball.

== Beach volleyball ==
As of 2015, she plays with Sophie van Gestel. At the 2016 Summer Olympics in Rio de Janeiro, the pair played in Pool-E and were eliminated with a set win/loss of 1W/6L.
