= Bárbara Seixas =

Brazilian beach volleyball player

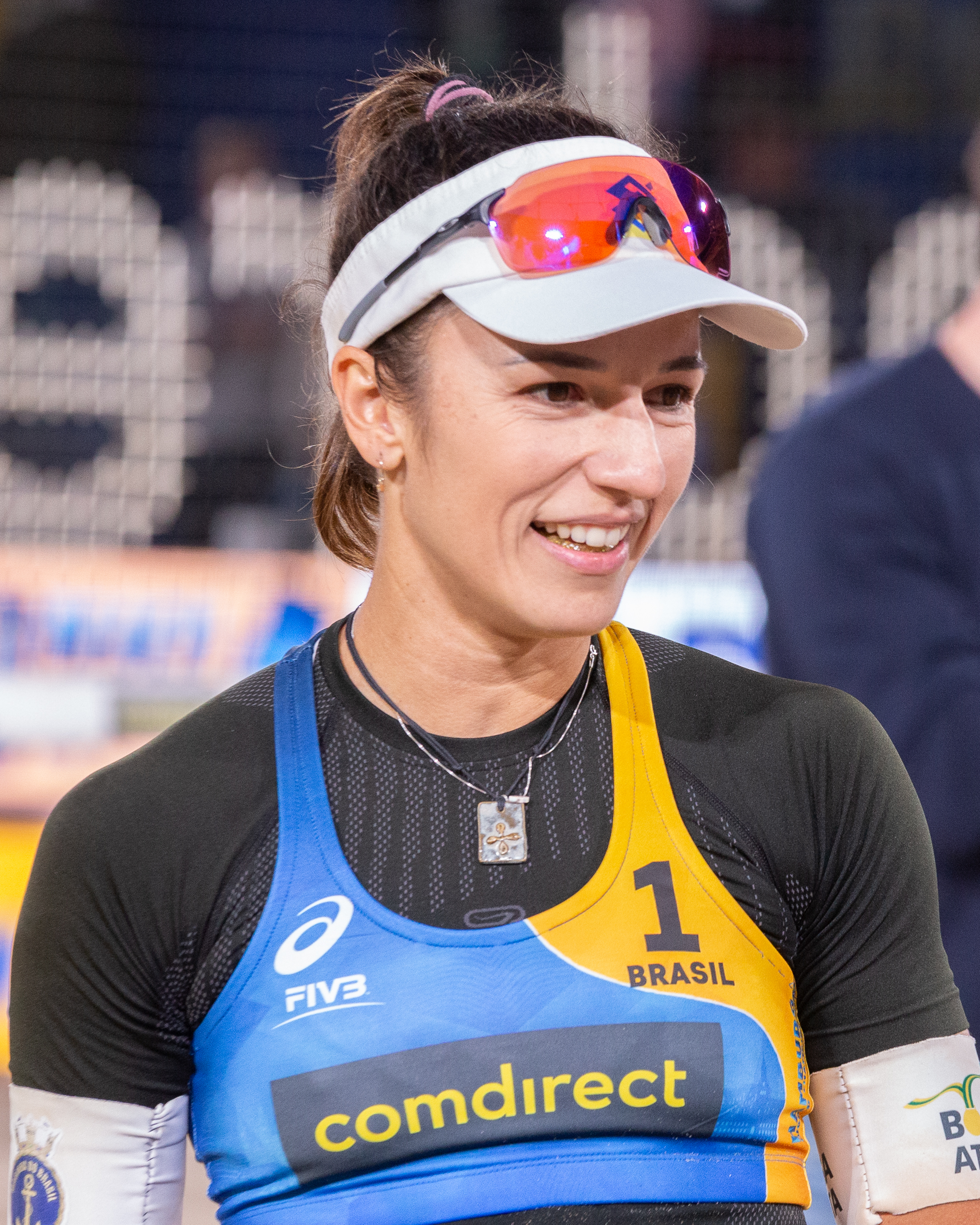
- Seixas at the 2019 World Championships

Personal information
- Full name: Bárbara Seixas de Freitas
- Nationality: Brazilian
- Born: 3 August 1987 (age 39)
- Hometown: Rio de Janeiro, Brazil
- Height: 1.78 m (5 ft 10 in)

Beach volleyball information
Years
- 2003–04 / 2021–24
- 2012 / 2014–17
Teammate
- Carolina Solberg Salgado
- Ágatha Bednarczuk
Honours
Women's beach volleyball
Representing Brazil
Olympic Games
| Silver medal – second place | 2016 Rio de Janeiro | Beach |
World Championships
| Gold medal – first place | 2015 The Hague | Beach |
| Bronze medal – third place | 2013 Stare Jabłonki | Beach |
South American Games
| Gold medal – first place | 2022 Asunción | Beach |
Youth World Championships
| Gold medal – first place | 2005 St. Quay | Beach U19 |
| Gold medal – first place | 2006 Myslowice | Beach U21 |
| Gold medal – first place | 2007 Modena | Beach U21 |
| Silver medal – second place | 2003 Pattaya | Beach U18 |
| Silver medal – second place | 2004 Termoli | Beach U18 |

Bárbara Seixas de Freitas (born 8 March 1987) is a Brazilian inactive beach volleyball player, playing as a defender. In 2012, she was named "FIVB Top Rookie of the Year". Seixas is a three-time youth World Champion and has reached the podium in several FIVB Beach Volleyball World Tour tournaments. She won a bronze medal at the 2013 World Championships alongside her teammate Liliane Maestrini, and per 13 August 2013 they rank third among the women's money leaders with $108,875.

In 2015, Seixas and her partner Ágatha won a gold medal at the 2015 World Championships.

== Professional career ==
=== 2016: Olympics final at home ===
Seixas and her partner Ágatha beat Kerri Walsh-Jennings and April Ross of United States, in straight sets of (22–20, 21–18) in the semi-final match in the Rio 2016 Summer Olympics. They lost in the deciding match for gold against Germany's pair Laura Ludwig and Kira Walkenhorst.

Awards
| Preceded by Britta Büthe (GER) | Women's FIVB World Tour "Top Rookie"; 2012 | Succeeded by Kira Walkenhorst (GER) |
