= Talita Antunes =

Brazilian beach volleyball player

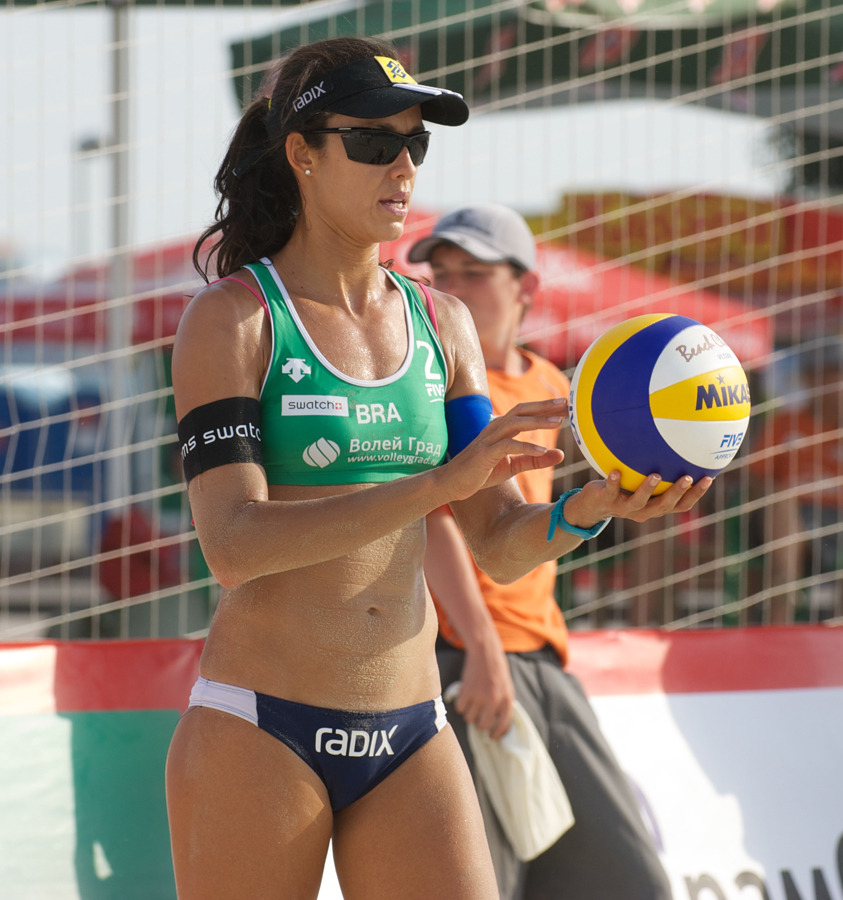
- Antunes in 2011

Personal information
- Full name: Talita Antunes da Rocha
- Nickname: Talita
- Born: August 29, 1982 (age 44); Aquidauana, MS, Brazil
- Hometown: Rio de Janeiro, Brazil
- Height: 5 ft 11 in (1.80 m)
- Weight: 64 kg (141 lb)

Beach volleyball information

Current teammate
Teammate
Larissa França

Previous teammates
Teammate	Tours (points)
Maria Clara Salgado; Tatiana Minello; Tais Jesus; Renata Ribeiro	1 (27); 1 (18); 1 (-)
Honours
Women's beach volleyball
Representing Brazil
World Championships
Bronze medal – third place	2009 Stavanger	Beach
Bronze medal – third place	2017 Vienna	Beach
World Tour Finals
Gold medal – first place	2015 Fort Lauderdale	Beach

Talita Antunes da Rocha (born August 29, 1982) is a Brazilian beach volleyball player, playing as a blocker. She was FIVB rookie of the year in 2005, and World Tour Winner twice, in 2013 and 2015.

== Career ==
Born in Aquidauana, Antunes caught the attention of Olympic Champion Jackie Silva at the age of 19. From the first time they played together, in Maceió in 2001, Jackie was impressed with Antunes' style and invited the young player to partner with her in 2002. The pair won the South American Championship in La Paz, Bolívia 2002.

After Silva was injured, Talita continued the 2002 season with Renata Ribeiro as her new partner. They won the championships in the Challenger Banco do Brasil in Natal and they were runners-up in the games held in Rio and Recife. In 2003, she was again champion in Goiânia do Circuito Banco do Brasil, this time with a new partner, Tais Jesus. She also partnered with Giseli Gavio on the Italian Circuit, ranking fourth overall. In 2005, she resumed her partnership with Ribeiro and was voted FIVB World Tour rookie of the year. Their partnership won them several competitions and they became one of the top-ranking teams in the world tour. In 2008, Talita was crowned Queen of the Beach in Brazil. In that same year, Talita and Renata represented Brazil in the 2008 Beijing Olympics. They finished fourth after losing a hard-fought Bronze Medal Match to the Chinese Team.

In 2009, Talita forged a new partnership with Maria Elisa Antonelli. They won gold in the 2009 Swatch FIVB World Tour in China, South Korea, Switzerland, and Norway. They also won the bronze medal at the 2009 World Championships in Stavanger, Norway. Their strong partnership landed Talita and Maria 1st overall ranking in the 2009 Brazilian Beach Volleyball Circuit and 2nd overall ranking in the 2009 World Ranking. Talita and Maria Elisa went to the 2012 Summer Olympics in London, but were upset in the round of 16 by a Czech double.

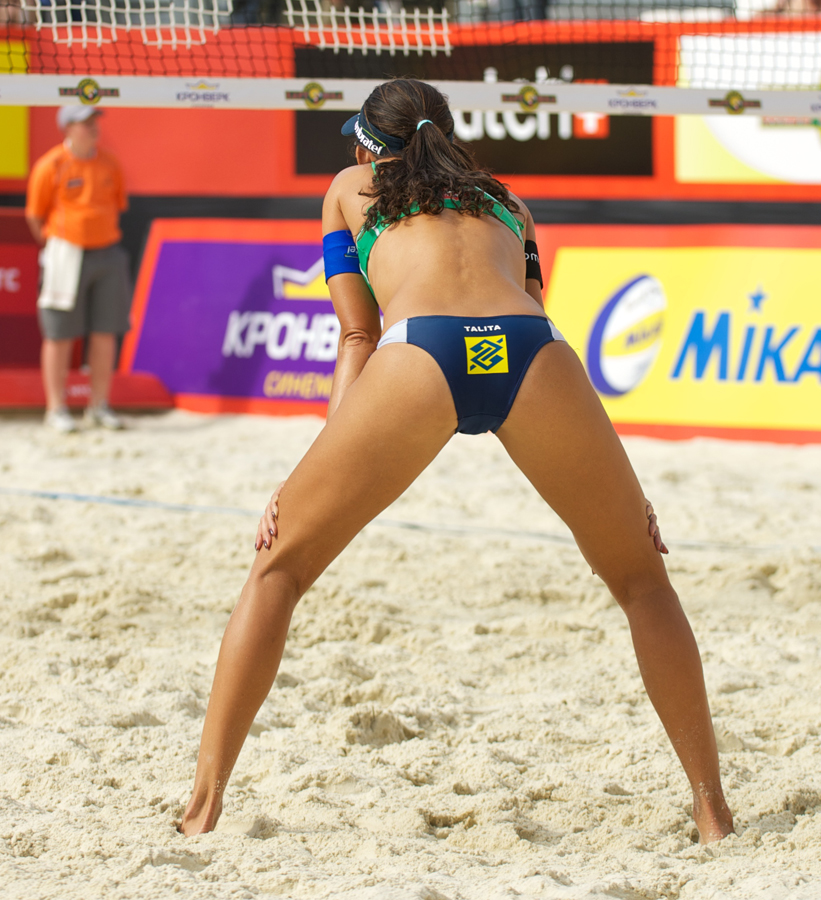
Talita Antunes at the 2012 Moscow Grand Slam.

After the Olympics, Talita partnered with Taiana Lima and won the FIVB Beach Volleyball World Tour for the first time in 2013. The following year, Larissa França, a former world champion who won bronze in London, signed to form a partnership with Talita aiming the 2016 Summer Olympics Brazil would host in Rio de Janeiro. Larissa and Talita were World Tour champions and Team of the Year in 2015, and were deemed favorites for the Olympic gold. Talita got to her second Olympic semifinal after a hard-fought win over the Swiss team of Joana Heidrich and Nadine Zumkehr in the quarterfinals, but went on to lose 2–0 to the Germans Ludwig and Walkenhosrt in the semi-final. April Ross and Kerri Walsh Jennings (the latter of whom also beat Talita in the 2008 semifinal) then won the bronze medal over the team in 3 sets.

== Personal life ==
Talita is married to Renato França, who coaches male beach volleyball squad Pedro Solberg and Evandro Oliveira.

Sporting positions
Preceded by Larissa França and Juliana Silva (BRA)	Women's FIVB Beach World Tour Winner alongside (Brazil) Taiana Lima; 2013	Succeeded by Maria Antonelli and Juliana Silva (BRA)
Preceded by Maria Antonelli and Juliana Silva (BRA)	Women's FIVB Beach World Tour Winner alongside (Brazil) Larissa França; 2015	Succeeded by Laura Ludwig and Kira Walkenhorst (GER)
Preceded by Laura Ludwig and Kira Walkenhorst (GER)	Women's FIVB Beach World Tour Winner alongside (Brazil) Larissa França; 2017	Succeeded by Incumbent
Awards
Preceded by Kerri Walsh Jennings (USA)	Women's FIVB World Tour "Best Blocker"; 2013	Succeeded by Kerri Walsh Jennings (USA)
Preceded by Kerri Walsh Jennings (USA)	Women's FIVB World Tour "Best Hitter"; 2013–2015	Succeeded by Kerri Walsh Jennings (USA)
Preceded by Juliana Silva (BRA)	Women's FIVB World Tour "Best Attacker"; 2013	Succeeded by Kerri Walsh Jennings (USA)
Preceded by Larissa França and Juliana Silva (BRA)	Women's FIVB World Tour "Team of the Year" alongside (Brazil) Taiana Lima; 2013	Succeeded by Juliana Silva and Maria Antonelliq (BRA)
Preceded by Maria Antonelli and Juliana Silva (BRA)	Women's FIVB World Tour "Team of the Year" alongside (Brazil) Larissa França; 2015	Succeeded by Laura Ludwig and Kira Walkenhorst (GER)
Preceded by Laura Ludwig and Kira Walkenhorst (GER)	Women's FIVB World Tour "Team of the Year" alongside (Brazil) Larissa França; 2017	Succeeded by Incumbent
Preceded by Inaugural	Women's FIVB World Tour "Top Rookie"; 2005	Succeeded by Xue Chen (CHN)
