= Sarah Pavan =

Canadian volleyball and beach volleyball player

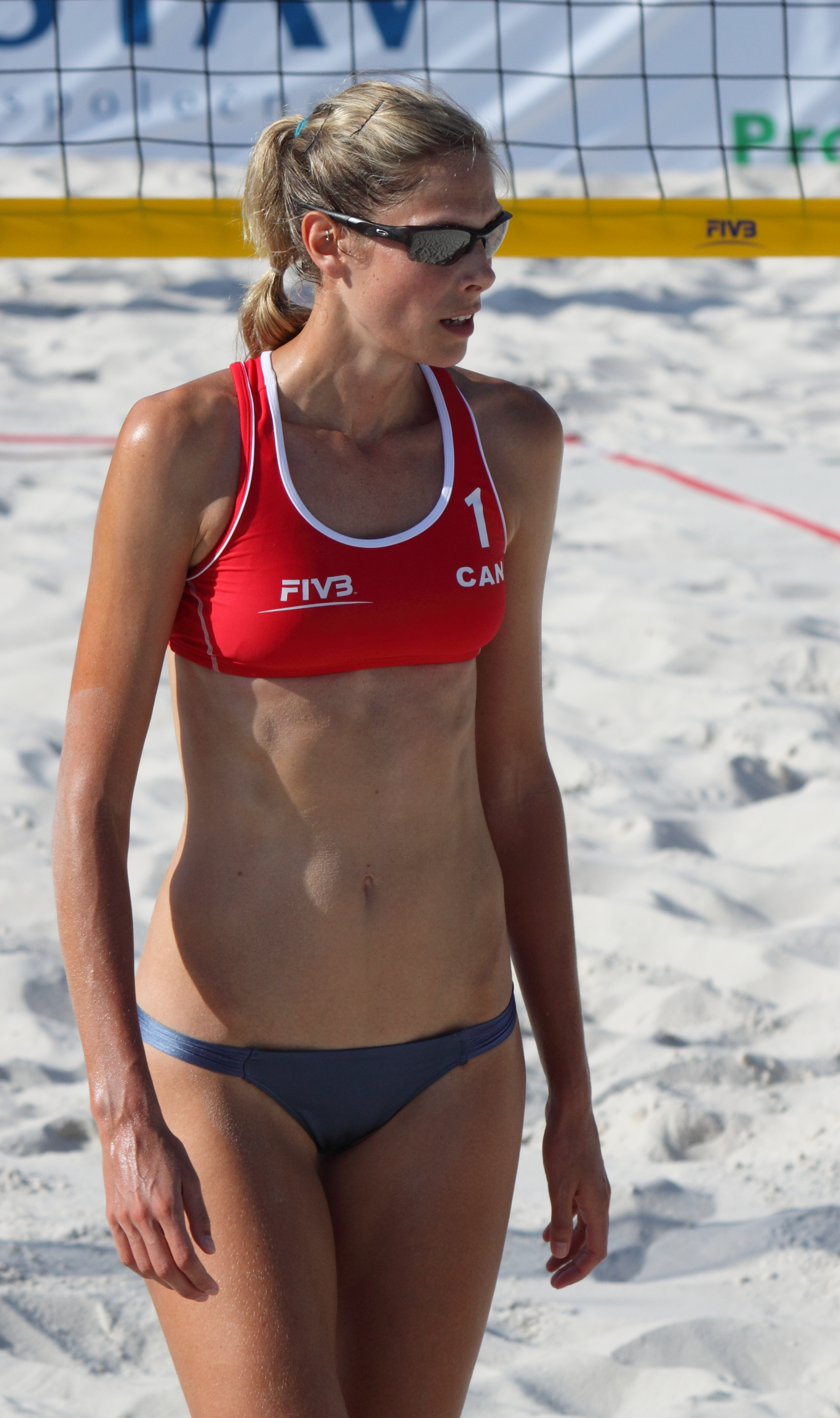
- Pavan in 2014

Personal information
- Nicknames: SP, Pav
- Born: August 16, 1986 (age 40) Kitchener, Ontario, Canada
- Education: University of Nebraska–Lincoln
- Height: 1.96 m (6 ft 5 in)
Best results
Years	Location	Result
2016 2016 2016 2019	Porec; Moscow; Rio Olympics; World Championships Hamburg	Rank 2 Rank 3 Rank 5 Rank 1

Volleyball information
- Position: Opposite hitter

Career
- Years: Team
- 2008–2010 2010–2011 2011–2012 2012–2014 2014–2015 2015–2017 2017–2018: Spes Volley Conegliano; Korea Expressway; MC Carnaghi; Unilever Rio de Janeiro; GS Caltex Seoul; Shanghai; Pomi Casalmaggiore

National team
- Years: Team
- 2003–2010: Canada
Honours
Women's beach volleyball
Representing Canada
World Championships
Gold medal – first place	2019 Hamburg	Beach
Commonwealth Games
Gold medal – first place	2022 Birmingham	Beach
Gold medal – first place	2018 Gold Coast	Beach
FIVB BVB World Tour
Gold medal – first place	2017 Porec	Beach
Gold medal – first place	2018 Xiamen	Beach
Gold medal – first place	2018 Gstaad	Beach
Gold medal – first place	2019 Vienna	Beach
Gold medal – first place	2019 Edmonton	Beach
Gold medal – first place	2022 Jurmala	Beach
Silver medal – second place	2017 Rio de Janeiro	Beach
Silver medal – second place	2017 Olsztyn	Beach
Silver medal – second place	2018 Las Vegas	Beach
Silver medal – second place	2019 Itapema	Beach
Bronze medal – third place	2017 Gstaad	Beach
Bronze medal – third place	2023 Chiang Mai	Beach
AVP Pro BVB Tour
Silver medal – second place	2019 Huntington Beach	Beach
Gold medal – first place	2019 Manhattan Beach	Beach

Sarah Lindsey Pavan (born August 16, 1986) is a Canadian former beach volleyball and indoor volleyball player. She was part of the Canada women's national volleyball team at the 2010 FIVB Volleyball Women's World Championship in Japan. With Melissa Humana-Paredes, she won the women's gold medal at the 2019 Beach Volleyball World Championships.

== College indoor volleyball career ==
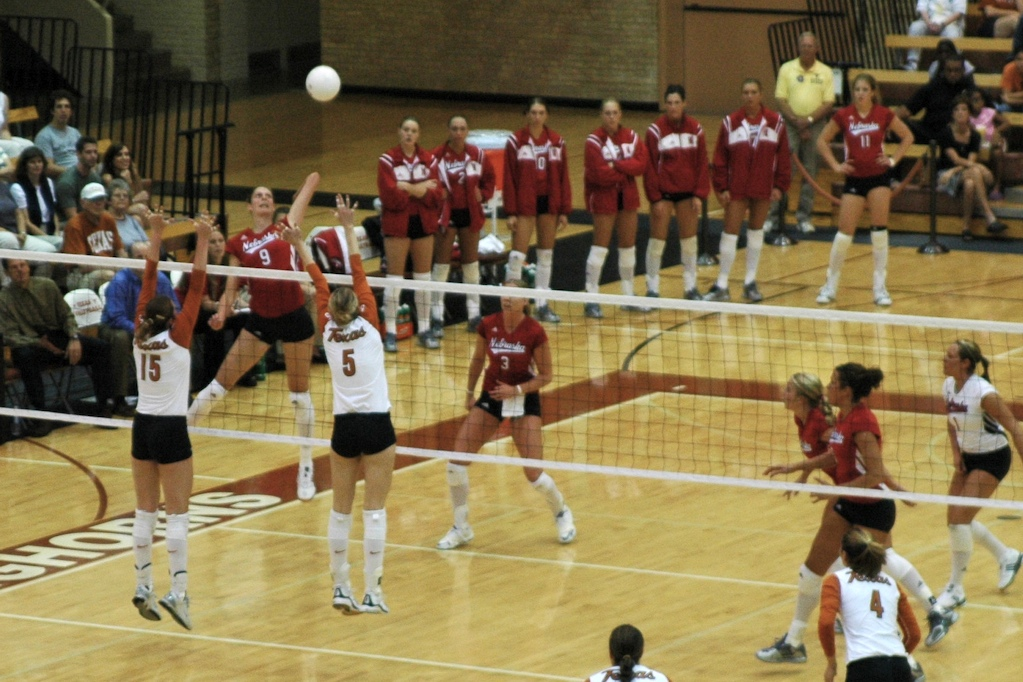
Pavan hitting against Big 12 rival Texas on Oct. 20, 2004

Pavan played college volleyball for the Nebraska Cornhuskers where she led her team to win the 2006 NCAA Division I women's volleyball tournament, in which she was named the tournament's Most Outstanding Player. Her collegiate accolades are numerous, and include winning the Honda Sports Award for volleyball (2007), the Honda-Broderick Cup (2006–07), the AVCA National Player of the Year (2006), and three times the Big 12 Conference Player of the Year (2005–07). She also won several academic awards, including twice winning ESPN The Magazine Academic All-American of the Year (2007–08) and earning a degree in biochemistry with a perfect 4.0 GPA.

== Pro beach volleyball career ==
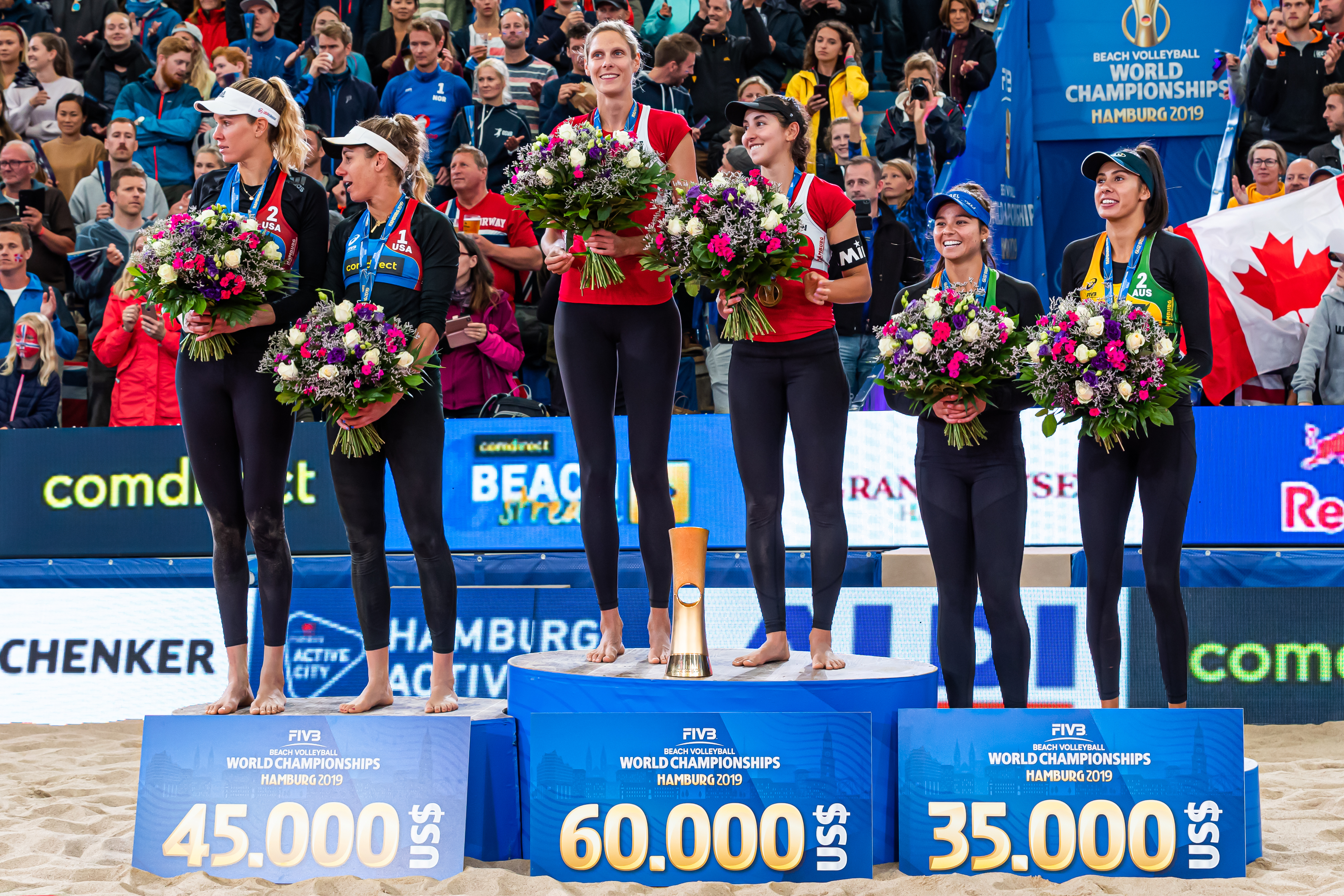
Pavan and Humana-Paredes after winning the gold medal at the World Championships in 2019

In beach volleyball, Pavan played as a right-side blocker. After contacting Heather Bansley to find out if she knew anyone looking for a partner, she paired up with Bansley in 2013 when she changed over to beach volleyball. After qualifying for the 2016 Summer Olympics in Rio, the pair competed in Pool E and won all 3 matches with a 2–0 set score. For the Round of 16 match, they were paired with the other Canadian team of Broder and Valjas, which they won in straight sets of (21–16, 21–11). They lost to Germany's Laura Ludwig and Kira Walkenhorst in straight sets of (14–21, 14–21) in the quarterfinals.

From September 2016 to July 2022, Pavan partnered with Melissa Humana-Paredes. The pair achieved initial success on the international circuit during the 2017 FIVB season by winning gold medals at the Porec Major, silver medals at both the Rio de Janeiro and Olsztyn Opens, and bronze medals at the Gstaad Major. Pavan and Humana-Paredes continued doing well internationally in 2018, winning the gold medal over Australia in straight sets at the 2018 Commonwealth Games. As it was the first time beach volleyball was competed at the Commonwealth Games, they became the first women to win a gold medal in the sport at the competition. After this initial success, the pair competed well on the 2018 FIVB Beach Volleyball World Tour, winning gold medals at both the Xiamen Open and Gstaad Major, and finishing in fourth place at the Huntington Beach Open.

During the 2019 FIVB season, they won silver medals at the Las Vegas and Itapema Open competitions. In their first AVP Pro Beach Volleyball Tour in 2019, they finished second in the tournament to the American duo of Alix Klineman and April Ross. Two months later, Pavan and Humana-Paredes won gold medals at the 2019 Beach Volleyball World Championships, defeating Klineman and Ross in straight sets for Canada's first medal ever at the event. As the FIVB tour continued in 2019, they subsequently won gold medals at the Edmonton Open and Vienna Major, though were eliminated in the quarterfinals of both the Gstaad Major and Tokyo Open by Klineman and Ross. In mid-August, the duo returned to the AVP tour, reaching the finals in the Manhattan Beach Open and defeating Klineman and Ross in three sets.

Pavan and Humana-Paredes were named to the Canadian Olympic team for the 2020 Summer Olympics in Tokyo, which the COVID-19 pandemic caused to be delayed until 2021. The two went undefeated during pool play, winning every set. Entering the knockout rounds as the top seed, they defeated Spaniards Liliana/Baquerizo in the Round of 16. In the quarter final, a rematch of the Commonwealth Games final with Australians Clancy/Artacho del Solar, they lost two sets to one and were eliminated from the tournament.

Pavan retired on October 21, 2024.

== Personal life ==
Pavan has a younger sister, Rebecca, who also played indoor volleyball at the University of Kentucky and for certain European clubs. She too competed for the Canadian women's national team. Pavan has a YouTube channel, in which she and her husband Adam reviews popular anime. She announced her pregnancy with her first child in May 2025. She gave birth to a daughter in September 2025.
