= Larissa França =

Brazilian beach volleyball player

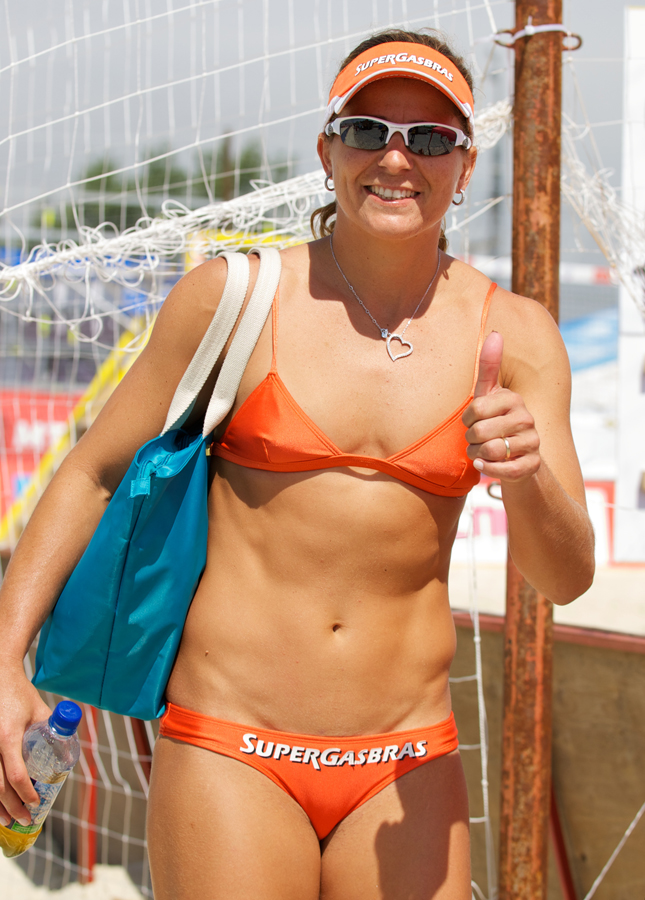
- França at the Grand Slam Moscow on September 3, 2012

Personal information
- Nickname: Larissa
- Born: April 14, 1982 (age 44); Cachoeiro do Itapemirim, ES, Brazil
- Hometown: Fortaleza, Brazil
- Height: 1.74 m (5 ft 9 in)
- Weight: 68 kg (150 lb)

Beach volleyball information

Current teammate
Teammate
Lili Maestrini

Previous teammates
Years	Teammate
2004-12; 2002-03	Juliana Silva; Ana Richa
Honours
Women's beach volleyball
Representing Brazil
Olympic Games
Bronze medal – third place	2012 London	Beach
World Championships
Gold medal – first place	2011 Rome	Beach
Silver medal – second place	2005 Berlin	Beach
Silver medal – second place	2009 Stavanger	Beach
Bronze medal – third place	2007 Gstaad	Beach
Bronze medal – third place	2017 Vienna	Beach
Pan American Games
Gold medal – first place	2007 Rio de Janeiro	Beach
Gold medal – first place	2011 Guadalajara	Beach
Bronze medal – third place	2003 Santo Domingo	Beach
World Tour Finals
Gold medal – first place	2015 Fort Lauderdale	Beach

Larissa França Maestrini (born April 14, 1982) is a Brazilian beach volleyball player. She is the all-time leader of beach volleyball titles, with 57 FIVB career gold medals, including the 2011 Beach Volleyball World Championships with Juliana Felisberta and the 2015 FIVB Beach Volleyball World Tour with Talita Antunes.

She was inducted to the Volleyball Hall of Fame in 2023.

== Career ==
With Felisberta, França won two Pan American Games titles (in 2007 and 2011) and the bronze medal at the 2012 Summer Olympics. Four years prior, França had had to play the 2008 Summer Olympics with Ana Paula Connelly following an injury to Felisberta, finishing in fifth place. She also won the bronze medal at the 2003 Pan American Games in Santo Domingo, Dominican Republic, partnering Ana Richa.

After a brief two year retirement following the 2012 Olympics, França went back to activity in 2014 in a double with Talita Antunes. The duo went on to win the gold medal at the 2015 Swatch FIVB World Tour Finals and earn a spot into the 2016 Summer Olympics.

The pair participated in the 2016 Summer Olympics in Rio. The pair won their quarterfinal match against the Swiss team of Joana Heidrich and Nadine Zumkehr in a nail biting match of three sets (21-23, 27–25, 15-13) in the quarter final played on August 14, 2016. The pair lost in straight sets to Ludwig and Walkenhosrt in the semifinal match. Next they went for bronze. They lost to the American team of April Ross and Kerri Walsh Jennings in 3 sets of (21–17, 17–21, 9–15); they finished 4th.

== Personal life ==
França was born in Cachoeiro de Itapemirim, Espírito Santo, and moved at a young age to the state of Pará. A sports enthusiast from her youth, she earned a volleyball scholarship in high school and went on to start her professional career at Tuna Luso Brasileira. She moved to beach volleyball in 2001, following an event held by the Brazilian Volleyball Confederation in Fortaleza.

In August 2013, França married fellow female player Liliane Maestrini, about one month after they came out about their relationship.

Sporting positions
Preceded by Adriana Behar and Shelda Bede (BRA)	Women's FIVB Beach World Tour Winner alongside (Brazil) Juliana Silva; 2005–2007	Succeeded by Ana Paula Connelly and Shelda Bede (BRA)
Preceded by Ana Paula Connelly and Shelda Bede (BRA)	Women's FIVB Beach World Tour Winner alongside (Brazil) Juliana Silva; 2009–2012	Succeeded by Talita Antunes and Taiana Lima (BRA)
Preceded by Maria Antonelli and Juliana Silva (BRA)	Women's FIVB Beach World Tour Winner alongside (Brazil) Talita Antunes; 2015	Succeeded by Laura Ludwig and Kira Walkenhorst (GER)
Preceded by Laura Ludwig and Kira Walkenhorst (GER)	Women's FIVB Beach World Tour Winner alongside (Brazil) Talita Antunes; 2017	Succeeded by Incumbent
Awards
Preceded by Misty May-Treanor (USA)	Women's FIVB World Tour "Best Defender"; 2009	Succeeded by Zhang Xi (CHN)
Preceded by Misty May-Treanor (USA)	Women's FIVB World Tour "Best Defender"; 2012	Succeeded by Laura Ludwig (GER)
Preceded by Laura Ludwig (GER)	Women's FIVB World Tour "Best Defender"; 2014	Succeeded by Heather Bansley (CAN)
Preceded by Kerri Walsh (USA)	Women's FIVB World Tour "Best Hitter"; 2008	Succeeded by April Ross (USA)
Preceded by April Ross (USA)	Women's FIVB World Tour "Best Hitter"; 2010	Succeeded by April Ross (USA)
Preceded by Kerri Walsh Jennings (USA)	Women's FIVB World Tour "Best Attacker"; 2015–	Succeeded by Incumbent
Preceded by Misty May-Treanor (USA)	Women's FIVB World Tour "Best Setter"; 2006–2012	Succeeded by Ilka Semmler (GER)
Preceded by Ilka Semmler (GER)	Women's FIVB World Tour "Best Setter"; 2014	Succeeded by Marleen van Iersel (NED)
Preceded by Marleen van Iersel (NED)	Women's FIVB World Tour "Best Setter"; 2016–	Succeeded by Incumbent
Preceded by Misty May-Treanor (USA)	Women's FIVB World Tour "Most Outstanding"; 2006	Succeeded by Kerri Walsh (USA)
Preceded by Kerri Walsh Jennings (USA)	Women's FIVB World Tour "Most Outstanding"; 2015	Succeeded by Laura Ludwig (GER)
Preceded by Inaugural	Women's FIVB World Tour "Team of the Year" alongside (Brazil) Juliana Silva; 2005–2007	Succeeded by Ana Paula Connelly and Shelda Bede (BRA)
Preceded by Ana Paula Connelly and Shelda Bede (BRA)	Women's FIVB World Tour "Team of the Year" alongside (Brazil) Juliana Silva; 2009–2012	Succeeded by Talita Antunes and Taiana Lima (BRA)
Preceded by Maria Antonelli and Juliana Silva (BRA)	Women's FIVB World Tour "Team of the Year" alongside (Brazil) Talita Antunes; 2015	Succeeded by Laura Ludwig and Kira Walkenhorst (GER)
Preceded by Laura Ludwig and Kira Walkenhorst (GER)	Women's FIVB World Tour "Team of the Year" alongside (Brazil) Talita Antunes; 2017	Succeeded by Incumbent
