= Fernanda Alves =

Brazilian beach volleyball player (born 1985)

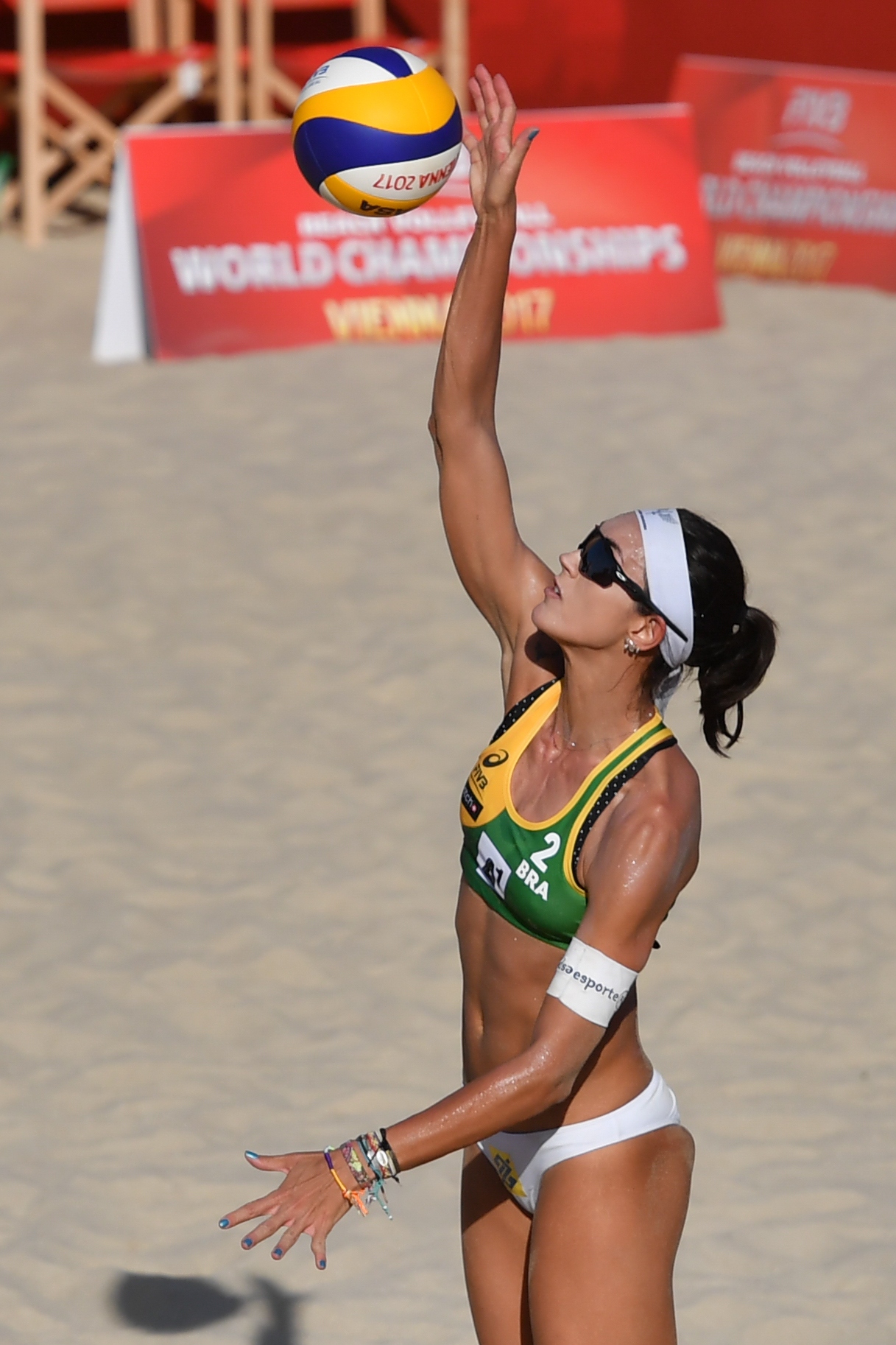
- Alves in 2017

Personal information
- Full name: Fernanda Berti Alves
- Born: 29 June 1985 (age 41); São Joaquim da Barra, São Paulo, Brazil
- Height: 1.89 m (6 ft 2 in)
- Weight: 74 kg (163 lb)
- Spike: 303 cm (119 in)
- Block: 287 cm (113 in)

Volleyball information
- Position: Opposite spiker

National team
2005	Brazil
Honours
Women's volleyball
Representing Brazil
World Grand Champions Cup
Gold medal – first place	2005 Japan	Team
South American Championship
Gold medal – first place	2005 La Paz
Women's beach volleyball
Representing Brazil
World Championships
Silver medal – second place	2015 The Hague	Beach

Fernanda Alves (born 29 June 1985) is a Brazilian volleyball player.

She was a member of the Brazil women's national volleyball team.

== Career ==
She participated in the 2005 FIVB Women's World Grand Champions Cup, and the 2017 FIVB Beach Volleyball World Championships.

== Clubs ==
- (Brazil) Fluminense FC (1999–2001)
- (Brazil) ACF/Campos (2001–2004)
- (Brazil) São Caetano (2004–2005)
- (Brazil) Brasil Telecom (2005–2006)
- (Brazil) Pinheiros (2006–2007)
- (South Korea) Daejeon KGC (2007–2008)
- (Italy) Pallavolo Cesena (2008–2010)
- (Brazil) Sport Recife (2009–2010)
- (Brazil) Praia Clube (2010–2011)
- (Brazil) Vôlei Futuro (2011–2012)
