= Maria Elisa Antonelli =

Brazilian beach volleyball player

Maria Antonelli
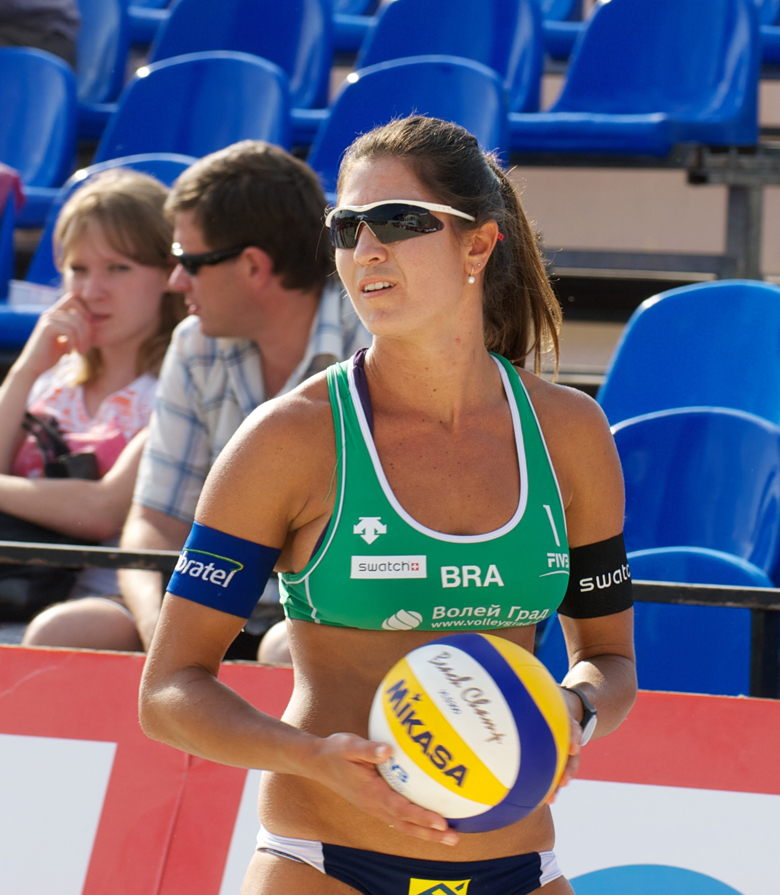

Personal information
- Full name: Maria Elisa Mendes Ticon Antonelli
- Born: 25 February 1984 (age 42); Resende, RJ, Brazil
- Hometown: Rio de Janeiro, Brazil
- Height: 176 cm (5 ft 9 in)

Beach volleyball information

Current teammate
Teammate
Juliana Silva
Honours
Women's beach volleyball
Representing Brazil
World Championships
Bronze medal – third place	2015 The Hague	Beach

Maria Elisa Mendes Ticon Antonelli (born 25 February 1984) is a Brazilian beach volleyball player. She competed with Talita Antunes at the 2012 Summer Olympics, qualifying from group E before losing to the Czech team of Kristýna Kolocová and Markéta Sluková in the last 16.

Sporting positions
Preceded by Talita Antunes and Taiana Lima (BRA)	Women's FIVB Beach World Tour Winner alongside (Brazil) Juliana Silva; 2014	Succeeded by Talita Antunes and Larissa França (BRA)
Awards
Preceded by Talita Antunes and Taiana Lima (BRA)	Women's FIVB World Tour "Team of the Year" alongside (Brazil) Juliana Silva; 2014	Succeeded by Talita Antunes and Larissa França (BRA)
