= Laura Ludwig =

German beach volleyball player

Laura Ludwig-Bowes
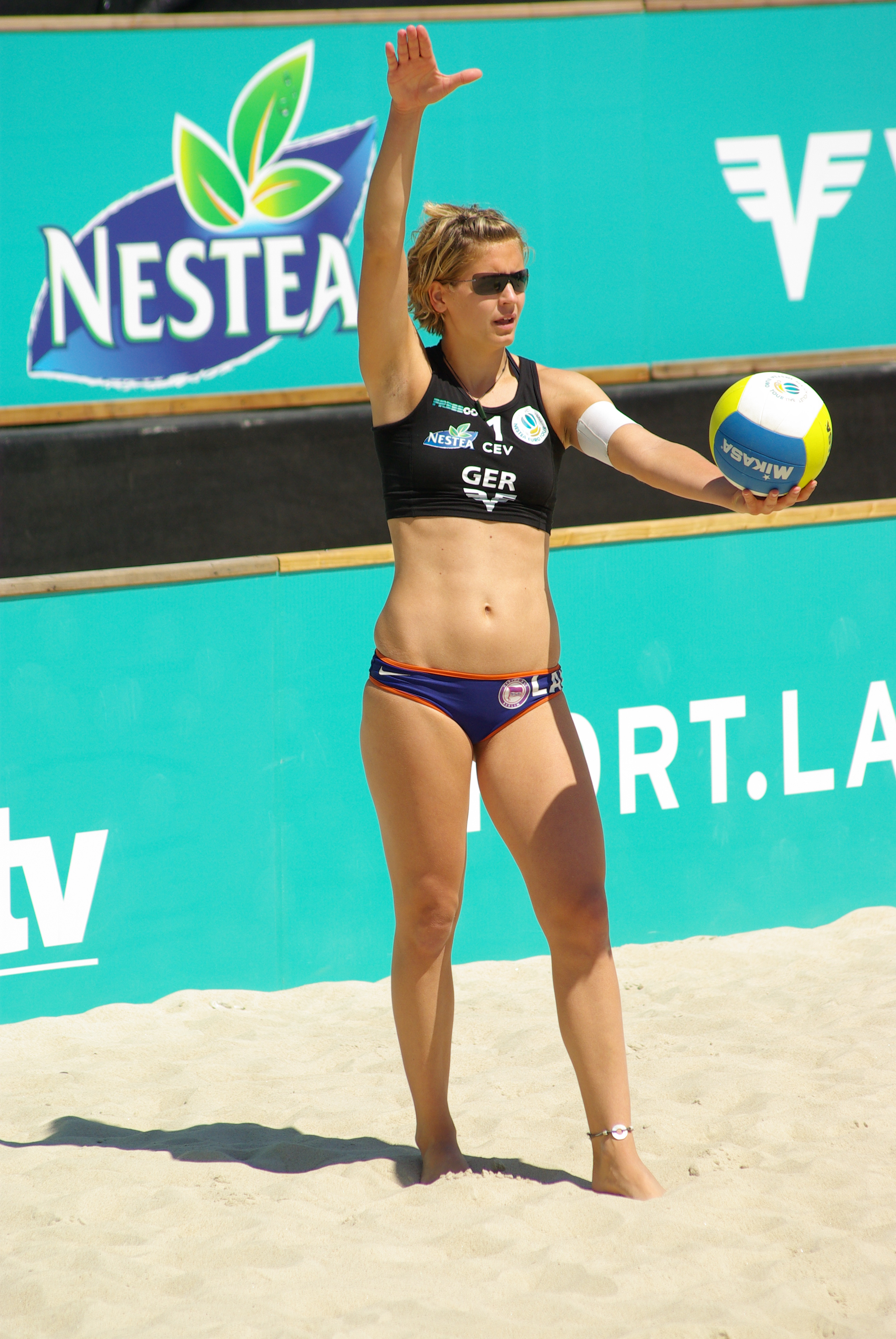
- Ludwig in 2008

Personal information
- Nationality: German
- Born: 13 January 1986 (age 40); East Berlin, East Germany
- Hometown: Berlin
- Height: 1.81 m (5 ft 11 in)
- Weight: 69 kg (152 lb)

Beach volleyball information

Current teammate
Teammate
Louisa Lippmann

Previous teammates
Years	Teammate
2014 Jul-Sept; 2004-2012; 2013-2017; 2018-2020; 2021	Julia Sude; Sara Goller; Kira Walkenhorst; Margareta Kozuch; Leonie Körtzinger
Honours
Women's beach volleyball
Representing Germany
Olympic Games
Gold medal – first place	2016 Rio de Janeiro	Beach
FIVB World Championships
Gold medal – first place	2017 Vienna	Beach
European Championships
Gold medal – first place	2008 Hamburg	Beach
Gold medal – first place	2010 Berlin	Beach
Gold medal – first place	2015 Klagenfurt	Beach
Gold medal – first place	2016 Biel/Bienne	Beach
Silver medal – second place	2007 Valencia	Beach
Silver medal – second place	2009 Sochi	Beach
Bronze medal – third place	2013 Klagenfurt	Beach
Bronze medal – third place	2014 Cagliari	Beach
Bronze medal – third place	2023 Vienna	Beach

Laura Ludwig-Bowes (born 13 January 1986) is a German professional beach volleyball player, playing as a defender. Previously forming a pair with compatriot Kira Walkenhorst, she represents Hamburger SV and has won four European championships. She won the gold medal at the 2016 Summer Olympics. She added another medal, Gold, at the 2016 World Tour Finals in Toronto. In 2017, she and Walkenhorst won the World Championship in Vienna.

== Biography ==
Ludwig was born in East Berlin, East Germany.

Initially paired with Jana Köhler, Ludwig won the U18 European Championship and later the U18 World Championship in Pattava Beach (Thailand). After surviving a stroke which nearly ended her career, she bounced back after teaming with a new partner, Sara Goller. Together, Ludwig and Goller became 2006 German champions, won the U23 European Championships in St. Pölten and ended up fourth in the women's European Championships the same year in The Hague. They continued their line of success in 2007, defending the German title and winning the silver medal in the European Championships in Valencia. Ludwig and Goller ended the 2007 season leading the German women's ranking and placing seventh overall.

She won silver medals at the 2007 and 2009 European beach volleyball championships, and gold medals at the 2008 and 2010 Beach ECH, alongside her former teammate Sara Goller. They competed at the 2008 and 2012 Summer Olympics, finishing in ninth place in 2008 and reaching the quarterfinals in 2012.

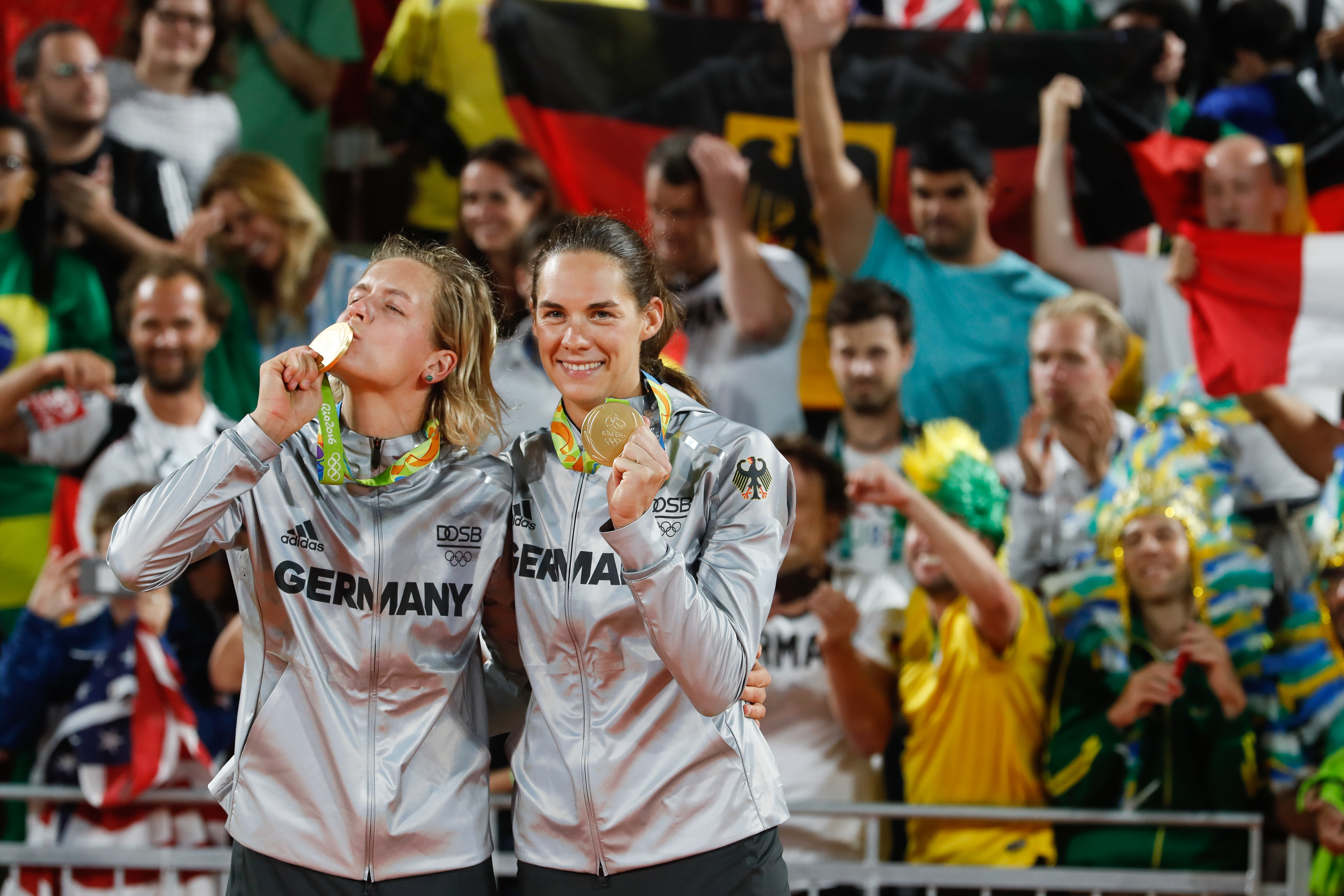
Gold Medal Rio Olympics 2016

In 2013 Ludwig formed a beach partnership with Kira Walkenhorst. The pairing was successful, with bronze medal finishes at the 2013 and 2014 European beach volleyball championship, and gold medals at the 2015 and 2016 Beach ECH. Ludwig and Walkenhorst won the gold medal at the 2016 Summer Olympics, defeating Brazil's pair of Ágatha and Bárbara in straight sets of 21-18 21–14 in the final.

=== World tour 2016 ===
Ludwig competed in the World Tour Finals in Toronto. With teammate Walkenhorst, they finished 3rd (last) in Pool B with 2 losses. In the quarter-final match against Ross and Walsh they won in 3 sets (21-18, 19–21, 15-11), advancing to the semi-final against Larissa and Talita of Brazil.

Winning against Brazil in straight sets of (21-19, 21-19) the pair advanced to the gold medal match. Another gold medal for the Olympic winners came in straight sets of (21-18, 21-16) against the Swiss pair of Zumkehr and Heidrich.

=== 2017 season ===
Ludwig did not compete at the opening round of the 2017 season in Fort Lauderdale due to a shoulder operation. Ludwig's regular partner Kira Walkenhorst temporarily partnered with Julia Großner.

Ludwig's first tournament of the 2017 season after her shoulder operation was the Smart Super Cup in Münster. Alongside regular partner Walkenhorst, they secured the gold medal with a 2:0 scoreline ahead of runners-up Laboureur & Sude. Ludwig's first international tournament in 2017 was the FIVB World Tour tournament in Rio de Janeiro. After beating Lusson/Jupiter and Juliana/Carol in Pool play and Davidova/Shchypkova in their third match they lost to Pavan/Humana-Paredes to finish the tournament in 5th position.

=== 2021 Season ===
In July, Ludwig partnered with Margareta Kozuch to represent Germany at the 2020 Summer Olympics in Tokyo that had been delayed due to the worldwide COVID-19 pandemic. The pair reached the quarter-finals, losing to the Americans April Ross and Alix Klineman.

== See also ==
- Sport in Berlin

Sporting positions
Preceded by Larissa França and Talita Antunes (BRA)	Women's FIVB Beach World Tour Winner alongside (Germany) Kira Walkenhorst; 2016	Succeeded by Larissa França and Talita Antunes (BRA)
Preceded by Ágatha Bednarczuk and Bárbara Seixas (BRA)	Women's FIVB Beach World Champion alongside (Germany) Kira Walkenhorst; 2017	Succeeded by Sarah Pavan and Melissa Humana-Paredes (CAN)
Preceded by Ágatha Bednarczuk and Eduarda Lisboa (BRA)	Women's FIVB Beach World Tour Finals Champion alongside (Germany) Kira Walkenhorst; 2019	Succeeded by Incumbent
Preceded by Larissa França and Talita Antunes (BRA)	Women's FIVB Beach World Tour Finals Champion alongside (Germany) Kira Walkenhorst; 2016 & 2017	Succeeded by Ágatha Bednarczuk and Eduarda Lisboa (BRA)
Awards
Preceded by TBD	Women's FIVB World Tour "Most Entertaining"; 2019	Succeeded by Incumbent
Preceded by Heather Bansley (CAN)	Women's FIVB World Tour "Best Defender"; 2017	Succeeded by Heather Bansley (CAN)
Preceded by Nadine Zumkehr (SUI)	Women's FIVB World Tour "Most Inspirational"; 2017	Succeeded by Ágatha Bednarczuk (BRA)
Preceded by Larissa França (BRA)	Women's FIVB World Tour "Most Outstanding"; 2016–2017	Succeeded by Duda (BRA)
Preceded by Juliana Silva (BRA)	Women's FIVB World Tour "Sportsperson"; 2015–2017	Succeeded by Ágatha Bednarczuk (BRA)
Preceded by Larissa França and Talita Antunes (BRA)	Women's FIVB World Tour "Team of the Year" alongside (Germany) Kira Walkenhorst; 2016	Succeeded by Larissa França and Talita Antunes (BRA)
Preceded by Larissa França (BRA)	Women's FIVB World Tour "Best Defender"; 2013	Succeeded by Larissa França (BRA)
Preceded by Misty May-Treanor (USA); Kerri Walsh Jennings (USA)	Women's FIVB World Tour "Most Inspirational"; 2013	Succeeded by Kerri Walsh Jennings (USA)
Preceded by Juliana Silva (BRA)	Women's FIVB World Tour "Best Attacker"; 2011	Succeeded by Juliana Silva (BRA)
Preceded by Leila Barros (BRA)	Women's FIVB World Tour "Most Improved" alongside (Australia) Tamsin Barnett; 2007	Succeeded by Nicole Branagh (USA)
Olympic Games
Preceded by Timo Boll	Flagbearer for Germany (with Patrick Hausding); Tokyo 2020	Succeeded by Incumbent
