= Beach volleyball at the 2016 Summer Olympics – Women's tournament =

Women's beach volleyball at the Games of the XXXI Olympiad
- Venue: Copacabana Stadium
- Dates: 6–17 August 2016
- Competitors: 48 from 17 nations
- Teams: 24

Medalists
1st place, gold medalist(s)		Laura Ludwig; Kira Walkenhorst	Germany
2nd place, silver medalist(s)		Ágatha Bednarczuk; Bárbara Seixas	Brazil
3rd place, bronze medalist(s)		April Ross; Kerri Walsh Jennings	United States

The women's beach volleyball tournament at the 2016 Olympic Games in Rio de Janeiro, Brazil, took place at the Copacabana Stadium. The competition was held from 6 to 17 August 2016. Twenty four teams with 48 athletes around the world competed for the gold medal.

The medals for the tournament were presented by Anita DeFrantz, IOC Member, Olympian one Bronze Medal, United States of America, and the gifts were presented by Dr. Ary Graça Filho, FIVB President.

== Qualification ==
Means of qualification	Date	Venue	Vacancies	Qualified
Host Country	—N/a	—N/a	1	Brazil
2015 World Championships	26 June – 5 July 2015	Netherlands	1	Brazil
FIVB Beach Volleyball Olympic Ranking	13 June 2016	(Switzerland) Lausanne	15	United States
FIVB Beach Volleyball Olympic Ranking	13 June 2016	(Switzerland) Lausanne	15	Germany
FIVB Beach Volleyball Olympic Ranking	13 June 2016	(Switzerland) Lausanne	15	Canada
FIVB Beach Volleyball Olympic Ranking	13 June 2016	(Switzerland) Lausanne	15	Netherlands
FIVB Beach Volleyball Olympic Ranking	13 June 2016	(Switzerland) Lausanne	15	Australia
FIVB Beach Volleyball Olympic Ranking	13 June 2016	(Switzerland) Lausanne	15	Italy
FIVB Beach Volleyball Olympic Ranking	13 June 2016	(Switzerland) Lausanne	15	Germany
FIVB Beach Volleyball Olympic Ranking	13 June 2016	(Switzerland) Lausanne	15	Spain
FIVB Beach Volleyball Olympic Ranking	13 June 2016	(Switzerland) Lausanne	15	Poland
FIVB Beach Volleyball Olympic Ranking	13 June 2016	(Switzerland) Lausanne	15	Switzerland
FIVB Beach Volleyball Olympic Ranking	13 June 2016	(Switzerland) Lausanne	15	Canada
FIVB Beach Volleyball Olympic Ranking	13 June 2016	(Switzerland) Lausanne	15	Switzerland
FIVB Beach Volleyball Olympic Ranking	13 June 2016	(Switzerland) Lausanne	15	United States
FIVB Beach Volleyball Olympic Ranking	13 June 2016	(Switzerland) Lausanne	15	Argentina
FIVB Beach Volleyball Olympic Ranking	13 June 2016	(Switzerland) Lausanne	15	China
2014–2016 AVC Continental Cup	20–26 June 2016	(Australia) Cairns	1	Australia
2014–2016 CAVB Continental Cup	12–18 April 2016	(Nigeria) Abuja	1	Egypt
2014–2016 CEV Continental Cup	22–26 June 2016	(Norway) Stavanger	1	Netherlands
2014–2016 CSV Continental Cup	22–26 June 2016	(Argentina) Santa Fe	1	Venezuela
2014–2016 NORCECA Continental Cup	20–26 June 2016	(Mexico) Guaymas	1	Costa Rica
2016 FIVB World Continental Cup	6–10 July 2016	(Russia) Sochi	2	Czech Republic
2016 FIVB World Continental Cup	6–10 July 2016	(Russia) Sochi	2	Russia
Total			24	

== Pools composition ==
Twenty-four teams were drawn in six pools of four teams. The top six teams from the FIVB beach volleyball Olympic ranking as of 12 June 2016 were seeded at the first row of each pools from pool A to F. The seventh to ninth from the ranking were drawn first in pool F, E, or D. Then, the tenth to twelfth were drawn in pool C, B, or A. The next row was filled by the teams ranked thirteenth to seventeenth. These teams were drawn in pool A to E. The remaining spot of third row was filled by one of the five confederation continental cup champions. Then, the four remaining confederation continental cup champions were drawn in pool F to C. Finally, the winners and runners-up from the World Continental Cup were drawn in the last two spots. Teams from the same national Olympic committee could not be drawn in the same pool, except in the last drawing.

On 3 August 2016, Viktoria Orsi Toth from Italy was excluded from the women's tournament due to positive doping test for clostebol before the competition. Her place was replaced by Laura Giombini.

Group	Team	NOC
Seeding	Talita Antunes / Larissa França	Brazil
Seeding	Ágatha Bednarczuk / Bárbara Seixas	Brazil
Seeding	April Ross / Kerri Walsh Jennings	United States
Seeding	Laura Ludwig / Kira Walkenhorst	Germany
Seeding	Heather Bansley / Sarah Pavan	Canada
Seeding	Madelein Meppelink / Marleen van Iersel	Netherlands
Draw 1	Louise Bawden / Taliqua Clancy	Australia
Draw 1	Karla Borger / Britta Büthe	Germany
Draw 1	Marta Menegatti / Laura Giombini	Italy
Draw 2	Elsa Baquerizo / Liliana Fernández	Spain
Draw 2	Monika Brzostek / Kinga Kołosińska	Poland
Draw 2	Isabelle Forrer / Anouk Vergé-Dépré	Switzerland
Draw 3	Jamie Broder / Kristina Valjas	Canada
Draw 3	Joana Heidrich / Nadine Zumkehr	Switzerland
Draw 3	Lauren Fendrick / Brooke Sweat	United States
Draw 3	Ana Gallay / Georgina Klug	Argentina
Draw 3	Wang Fan / Yue Yuan	China
Draw 4–5	Mariafe Artacho / Nicole Laird	Australia
Draw 4–5	Doaa Elghobashy / Nada Meawad	Egypt
Draw 4–5	Jantine van der Vlist / Sophie van Gestel	Netherlands
Draw 4–5	Norisbeth Agudo / Olaya Pérez Pazo	Venezuela
Draw 4–5	Nathalia Alfaro / Karen Cope	Costa Rica
Draw 6	Barbora Hermannová / Markéta Sluková	Czech Republic
Draw 6	Ekaterina Birlova / Evgenia Ukolova	Russia

Draw

Pool A	Pool B	Pool C
Larissa – Talita (BRA)	Ágatha – Bárbara (BRA)	Ross – Walsh Jennings (USA)
Brzostek – Kołosińska (POL)	Elsa – Liliana (ESP)	Forrer – Vergé-Dépré (SUI)
Fendrick – Sweat (USA)	Gallay – Klug (ARG)	Wang – Yue (CHN)
Birlova – Ukolova (RUS)	Hermannová – Sluková (CZE)	Artacho Del Solar – Laird (AUS)

Pool D	Pool E	Pool F
Ludwig – Walkenhorst (GER)	Bansley – Pavan (CAN)	Meppelink – Van Iersel (NED)
Menegatti – Giombini (ITA)	Borger – Büthe (GER)	Bawden – Clancy (AUS)
Broder – Valjas (CAN)	Heidrich – Zumkehr (SUI)	Alfaro – C. Charles (CRC)
Elghobashy – Nada (EGY)	van der Vlist – van Gestel (NED)	Agudo – Pazo (VEN)

== Venue ==
Rio de Janeiro, Brazil
Copacabana Stadium
Capacity: 12,000
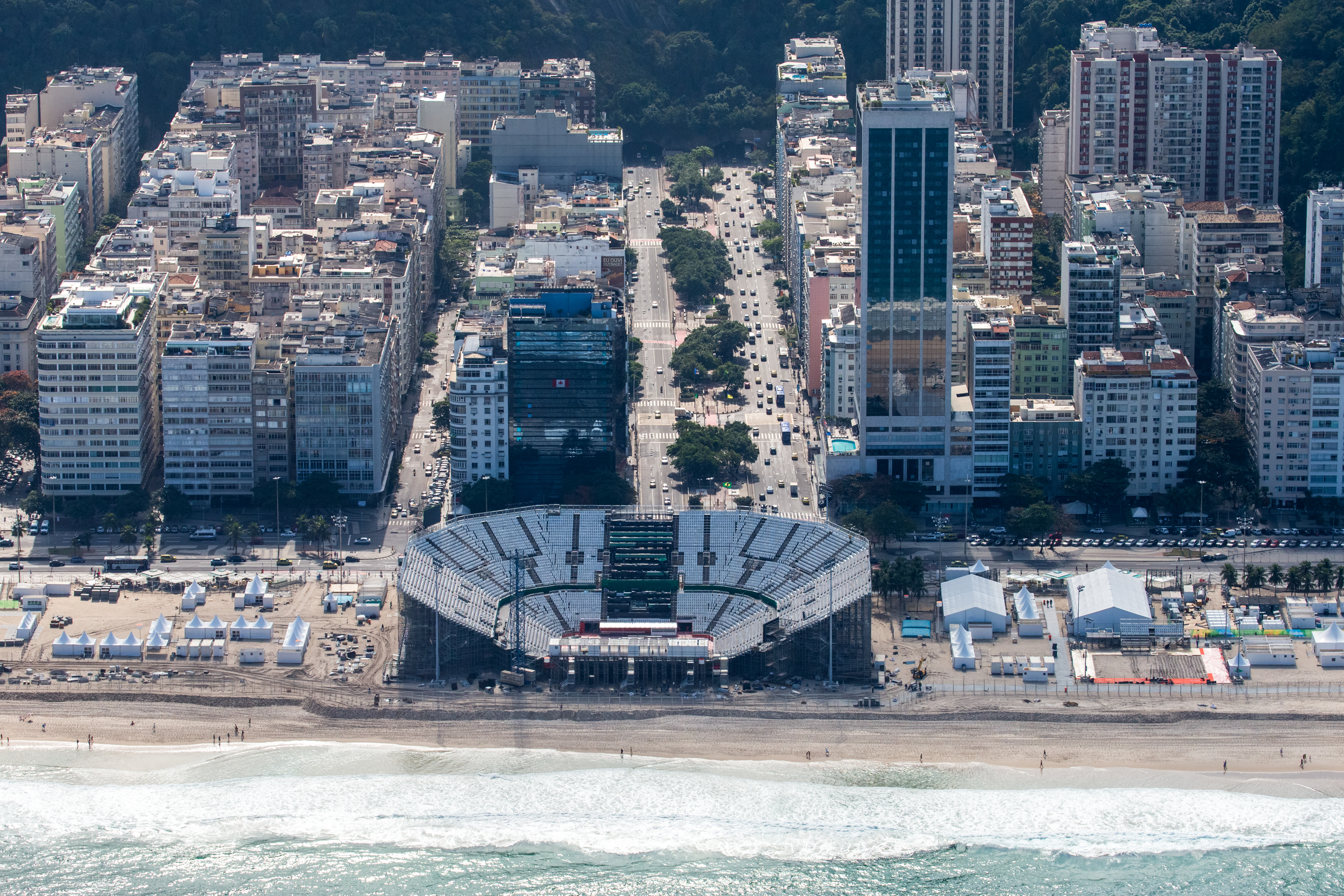

== Format ==
The preliminary round was a competition between the twenty four teams divided into six groups of four teams. This round, the teams competed in a single round-robin format. The two highest ranked teams in each group and the two best third ranked teams advanced automatically to the knockout stage. The other four third ranked teams faced the lucky loser playoffs to take the last two spots. The fourth placed teams in each pool were ranked nineteenth in this competition. The losers from the lucky loser playoffs were tied seventeenth. The knockout stage followed the single-elimination format. The losers in the round of sixteen were ranked ninth. The four quarter-final losers finished fifth. The winners of the semi-finals competed for gold medals and the losers played for bronze medals.

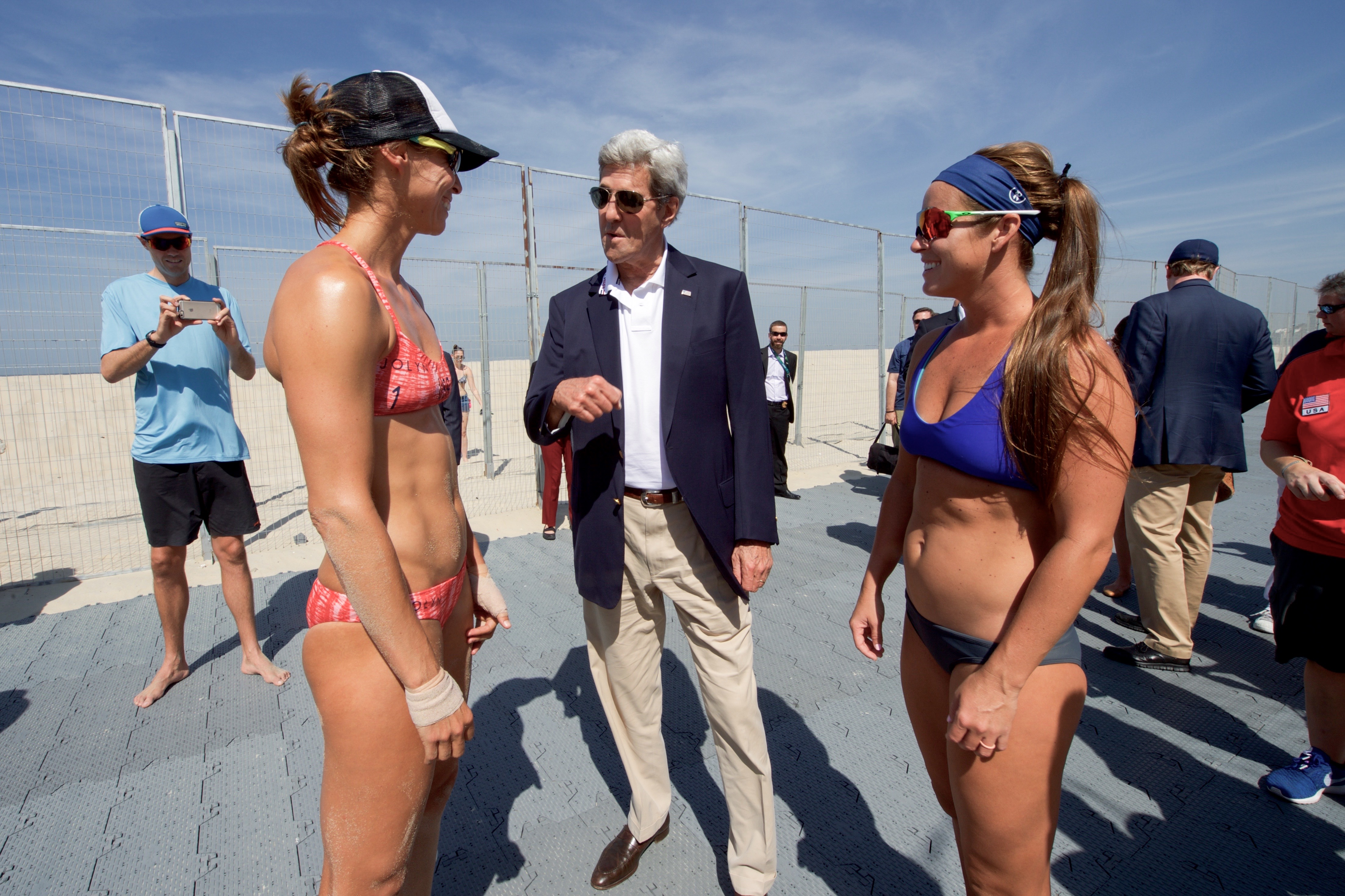
US politician John Kerry speaking with Lauren Fendrick and Brooke Sweat at Copacabana.

== Pool standing procedure ==
1. Match points (2 for the winner, 1 for the loser, 0 for forfeit)
2. Between 2 teams consider all teams points ratio / Between 3 teams consider head-to-head points ratio
3. Seeding position of the pools composition

== Referees ==
The following referees were selected for the tournament.

- (Argentina) Osvaldo Sumavil
- (Brazil) Mário Ferro
- (Brazil) Elizir Martins de Oliveira
- (Canada) Lucie Guillemette
- (China) Wang Lijun
- (Colombia) Juan Carlos Saavedra
- (Greece) Charalampos Papadogoulas
- (Italy) Davide Crescentini
- (Japan) Mariko Satomi
- (Puerto Rico) Carlos L. Rivera Rodriguez
- (Russia) Roman Pristovakin
- (South Africa) Giovanni Bake
- (Spain) José Maria Padron
- (Switzerland) Jonas Personeni
- (Thailand) Kritsada Panaseri
- (United States) Daniel Apol

== Preliminary round ==
- All times are Brasília Time (UTC−03:00).

=== Pool A ===
Pos	Team	Pld	W	L	Pts	SW	SL	SR	SPW	SPL	SPR	Qualification
1	Larissa – Talita (BRA)	3	3	0	6	6	0	MAX	126	84	1.500	Round of 16
2	Brzostek – Kołosińska (POL)	3	2	1	5	4	3	1.333	117	119	0.983	Round of 16
3	Birlova – Ukolova (RUS)	3	1	2	4	2	5	0.400	126	141	0.894	Lucky losers
4	Fendrick – Sweat (USA)	3	0	3	3	2	6	0.333	127	152	0.836	

Source: FIVB

7 August 2016; 10:00	Larissa – Talita (Brazil)	2–0	(Russia) Birlova – Ukolova	Copacabana Stadium, Rio de Janeiro; Attendance: 4,400; Referees: José Padron (ESP), Daniel Apol (USA)
7 August 2016; 10:00	(21–14, 21–16); Report			Copacabana Stadium, Rio de Janeiro; Attendance: 4,400; Referees: José Padron (ESP), Daniel Apol (USA)

7 August 2016; 11:00	Brzostek – Kołosińska (Poland)	2–1	(United States) Fendrick – Sweat	Copacabana Stadium, Rio de Janeiro; Attendance: 4,400; Referees: Carlos Rodríguez (PUR), Davide Crescentini (ITA)
7 August 2016; 11:00	(14–21, 21–13, 15–7); Report			Copacabana Stadium, Rio de Janeiro; Attendance: 4,400; Referees: Carlos Rodríguez (PUR), Davide Crescentini (ITA)

9 August 2016; 13:00	Brzostek – Kołosińska (Poland)	2–0	(Russia) Birlova – Ukolova	Copacabana Stadium, Rio de Janeiro; Attendance: 8,599; Referees: Davide Crescentini (ITA), José Padron (ESP)
9 August 2016; 13:00	(21–19, 21–18); Report			Copacabana Stadium, Rio de Janeiro; Attendance: 8,599; Referees: Davide Crescentini (ITA), José Padron (ESP)

9 August 2016; 16:30	Larissa – Talita (Brazil)	2–0	(United States) Fendrick – Sweat	Copacabana Stadium, Rio de Janeiro; Attendance: 8,502; Referees: Charalampos Papadogoulas (GRE), Lucie Guillemette (CAN)
9 August 2016; 16:30	(21–16, 21–13); Report			Copacabana Stadium, Rio de Janeiro; Attendance: 8,502; Referees: Charalampos Papadogoulas (GRE), Lucie Guillemette (CAN)

11 August 2016; 10:00	Larissa – Talita (Brazil)	2–0	(Poland) Brzostek – Kołosińska	Copacabana Stadium, Rio de Janeiro; Referees: Mariko Satomi (JPN), Carlos Rodríguez (PUR)
11 August 2016; 10:00	(21–10, 21–15); Report			Copacabana Stadium, Rio de Janeiro; Referees: Mariko Satomi (JPN), Carlos Rodríguez (PUR)

11 August 2016; 15:30	Fendrick – Sweat (United States)	1–2	(Russia) Birlova – Ukolova	Copacabana Stadium, Rio de Janeiro; Attendance: 5,009; Referees: Wang Lijun (CHN), Lucie Guillemette (CAN)
11 August 2016; 15:30	(18–21, 26–24, 13–15); Report			Copacabana Stadium, Rio de Janeiro; Attendance: 5,009; Referees: Wang Lijun (CHN), Lucie Guillemette (CAN)

=== Pool B ===
Pos	Team	Pld	W	L	Pts	SW	SL	SR	SPW	SPL	SPR	Qualification
1	Elsa – Liliana (ESP)	3	3	0	6	6	0	MAX	127	101	1.257	Round of 16
2	Ágatha – Bárbara (BRA)	3	2	1	5	4	3	1.333	134	120	1.117	Round of 16
3	Hermannová – Sluková (CZE)	3	1	2	4	3	5	0.600	132	145	0.910	Lucky losers
4	Gallay – Klug (ARG)	3	0	3	3	1	6	0.167	106	133	0.797	

Source: FIVB

6 August 2016; 13:00	Elsa – Liliana (Spain)	2–0	(Argentina) Gallay – Klug	Copacabana Stadium, Rio de Janeiro; Attendance: 8,200; Referees: Charalampos Papadogoulas (GRE), Jonas Personeni (SUI)
6 August 2016; 13:00	(21–11, 21–19); Report			Copacabana Stadium, Rio de Janeiro; Attendance: 8,200; Referees: Charalampos Papadogoulas (GRE), Jonas Personeni (SUI)

6 August 2016; 15:30	Ágatha – Bárbara (Brazil)	2–1	(Czech Republic) Hermannová – Sluková	Copacabana Stadium, Rio de Janeiro; Referees: Daniel Apol (USA), Jonas Personeni (SUI)
6 August 2016; 15:30	(19–21, 21–17, 15–11); Report			Copacabana Stadium, Rio de Janeiro; Referees: Daniel Apol (USA), Jonas Personeni (SUI)

8 August 2016; 11:00	Ágatha – Bárbara (Brazil)	2–0	(Argentina) Gallay – Klug	Copacabana Stadium, Rio de Janeiro; Referees: Wang Lijun (CHN), Charalampos Papadogoulas (GRE)
8 August 2016; 11:00	(21–11, 21–17); Report			Copacabana Stadium, Rio de Janeiro; Referees: Wang Lijun (CHN), Charalampos Papadogoulas (GRE)

8 August 2016; 22:00	Elsa – Liliana (Spain)	2–0	(Czech Republic) Hermannová – Sluková	Copacabana Stadium, Rio de Janeiro; Attendance: 8,593; Referees: Wang Lijun (CHN), Lucie Guillemette (CAN)
8 August 2016; 22:00	(21–15, 21–19); Report			Copacabana Stadium, Rio de Janeiro; Attendance: 8,593; Referees: Wang Lijun (CHN), Lucie Guillemette (CAN)

10 August 2016; 17:30	Ágatha – Bárbara (Brazil)	0–2	(Spain) Elsa – Liliana	Copacabana Stadium, Rio de Janeiro; Attendance: 6,531; Referees: Carlos Rodríguez (PUR), Mariko Satomi (JPN)
10 August 2016; 17:30	(17–21, 20–22); Report			Copacabana Stadium, Rio de Janeiro; Attendance: 6,531; Referees: Carlos Rodríguez (PUR), Mariko Satomi (JPN)

10 August 2016; 22:00	Gallay – Klug (Argentina)	1–2	(Czech Republic) Hermannová – Sluková	Copacabana Stadium, Rio de Janeiro; Attendance: 7,980; Referees: Giovanni Bake (RSA), Lucie Guillemette (CAN)
10 August 2016; 22:00	(21–13, 19–21, 8–15); Report			Copacabana Stadium, Rio de Janeiro; Attendance: 7,980; Referees: Giovanni Bake (RSA), Lucie Guillemette (CAN)

=== Pool C ===
Pos	Team	Pld	W	L	Pts	SW	SL	SR	SPW	SPL	SPR	Qualification
1	Ross – Walsh Jennings (USA)	3	3	0	6	6	1	6.000	142	101	1.406	Round of 16
2	Wang – Yue (CHN)	3	2	1	5	4	3	1.333	124	123	1.008	Round of 16
3	Forrer – Vergé-Dépré (SUI)	3	1	2	4	4	5	0.800	165	171	0.965	Round of 16
4	Artacho Del Solar – Laird (AUS)	3	0	3	3	1	6	0.167	109	145	0.752	

Source: FIVB

6 August 2016; 23:00	Forrer – Vergé-Dépré (Switzerland)	1–2	(China) Wang – Yue	Copacabana Stadium, Rio de Janeiro; Attendance: 7,844; Referees: Lucie Guillemette (CAN), Osvaldo Sumavil (ARG)
6 August 2016; 23:00	(22–24, 21–18, 12–15); Report			Copacabana Stadium, Rio de Janeiro; Attendance: 7,844; Referees: Lucie Guillemette (CAN), Osvaldo Sumavil (ARG)

7 August 2016; 00:00	Ross – Walsh Jennings (United States)	2–0	(Australia) Artacho Del Solar – Laird	Copacabana Stadium, Rio de Janeiro; Attendance: 3,135; Referees: Wang Lijun (CHN), Charalampos Papadogoulas (GRE)
7 August 2016; 00:00	(21–14, 21–13); Report			Copacabana Stadium, Rio de Janeiro; Attendance: 3,135; Referees: Wang Lijun (CHN), Charalampos Papadogoulas (GRE)

8 August 2016; 10:00	Forrer – Vergé-Dépré (Switzerland)	2–1	(Australia) Artacho Del Solar – Laird	Copacabana Stadium, Rio de Janeiro; Attendance: 2,688; Referees: Osvaldo Sumavil (ARG), Giovanni Bake (RSA)
8 August 2016; 10:00	(19–21, 21–16, 21–19); Report			Copacabana Stadium, Rio de Janeiro; Attendance: 2,688; Referees: Osvaldo Sumavil (ARG), Giovanni Bake (RSA)

9 August 2016; 00:00	Ross – Walsh Jennings (United States)	2–0	(China) Wang – Yue	Copacabana Stadium, Rio de Janeiro; Attendance: 8,272; Referees: Charalampos Papadogoulas (GRE), Lucie Guillemette (CAN)
9 August 2016; 00:00	(21–16, 21–9); Report			Copacabana Stadium, Rio de Janeiro; Attendance: 8,272; Referees: Charalampos Papadogoulas (GRE), Lucie Guillemette (CAN)

10 August 2016; 13:00	Wang – Yue (China)	2–0	(Australia) Artacho Del Solar – Laird	Copacabana Stadium, Rio de Janeiro; Attendance: 7,245; Referees: Osvaldo Sumavil (ARG), Lucie Guillemette (CAN)
10 August 2016; 13:00	(21–16, 21–10); Report			Copacabana Stadium, Rio de Janeiro; Attendance: 7,245; Referees: Osvaldo Sumavil (ARG), Lucie Guillemette (CAN)

10 August 2016; 21:00	Ross – Walsh Jennings (United States)	2–1	(Switzerland) Forrer – Vergé-Dépré	Copacabana Stadium, Rio de Janeiro; Attendance: 8,577; Referees: Roman Pristovakin (RUS), Osvaldo Sumavil (ARG)
10 August 2016; 21:00	(21–13, 22–24, 15–12); Report			Copacabana Stadium, Rio de Janeiro; Attendance: 8,577; Referees: Roman Pristovakin (RUS), Osvaldo Sumavil (ARG)

=== Pool D ===
Pos	Team	Pld	W	L	Pts	SW	SL	SR	SPW	SPL	SPR	Qualification
1	Ludwig – Walkenhorst (GER)	3	3	0	6	6	1	6.000	138	103	1.340	Round of 16
2	Broder – Valjas (CAN)	3	2	1	5	4	3	1.333	121	118	1.025	Round of 16
3	Menegatti – Giombini (ITA)	3	1	2	4	4	4	1.000	138	128	1.078	Round of 16
4	Elghobashy – Nada (EGY)	3	0	3	3	0	6	0.000	78	126	0.619	

Source: FIVB

7 August 2016; 18:30	Ludwig – Walkenhorst (Germany)	2–0	(Egypt) Elghobashy – Nada	Copacabana Stadium, Rio de Janeiro; Attendance: 8,523; Referees: Lucie Guillemette (CAN), Mário Ferro (BRA)
7 August 2016; 18:30	(21–12, 21–15); Report			Copacabana Stadium, Rio de Janeiro; Attendance: 8,523; Referees: Lucie Guillemette (CAN), Mário Ferro (BRA)

7 August 2016; 22:00	Menegatti – Giombini (Italy)	1–2	(Canada) Broder – Valjas	Copacabana Stadium, Rio de Janeiro; Attendance: 7,329; Referees: Carlos Rodríguez (PUR), Kritsada Panaseri (THA)
7 August 2016; 22:00	(21–15, 18–21, 9–15); Report			Copacabana Stadium, Rio de Janeiro; Attendance: 7,329; Referees: Carlos Rodríguez (PUR), Kritsada Panaseri (THA)

9 August 2016; 12:00	Menegatti – Giombini (Italy)	2–0	(Egypt) Elghobashy – Nada	Copacabana Stadium, Rio de Janeiro; Attendance: 3,988; Referees: Kritsada Panaseri (THA), Carlos Rodríguez (PUR)
9 August 2016; 12:00	(21–10, 21–13); Report			Copacabana Stadium, Rio de Janeiro; Attendance: 3,988; Referees: Kritsada Panaseri (THA), Carlos Rodríguez (PUR)

9 August 2016; 18:30	Ludwig – Walkenhorst (Germany)	2–0	(Canada) Broder – Valjas	Copacabana Stadium, Rio de Janeiro; Attendance: 7,590; Referees: Mário Ferro (BRA), Wang Lijun (CHN)
9 August 2016; 18:30	(21–17, 21–11); Report			Copacabana Stadium, Rio de Janeiro; Attendance: 7,590; Referees: Mário Ferro (BRA), Wang Lijun (CHN)

11 August 2016; 15:30	Broder – Valjas (Canada)	2–0	(Egypt) Elghobashy – Nada	Copacabana Stadium Court 1, Rio de Janeiro; Referees: Kritsada Panaseri (THA), Mariko Satomi (JPN)
11 August 2016; 15:30	(21–12, 21–16); Report			Copacabana Stadium Court 1, Rio de Janeiro; Referees: Kritsada Panaseri (THA), Mariko Satomi (JPN)

11 August 2016; 21:00	Ludwig – Walkenhorst (Germany)	2–1	(Italy) Menegatti – Giombini	Copacabana Stadium, Rio de Janeiro; Attendance: 4,832; Referees: José Padron (ESP), Mariko Satomi (JPN)
11 August 2016; 21:00	(21–18, 18–21, 15–9); Report			Copacabana Stadium, Rio de Janeiro; Attendance: 4,832; Referees: José Padron (ESP), Mariko Satomi (JPN)

=== Pool E ===
Pos	Team	Pld	W	L	Pts	SW	SL	SR	SPW	SPL	SPR	Qualification
1	Bansley – Pavan (CAN)	3	3	0	6	6	0	MAX	126	102	1.235	Round of 16
2	Heidrich – Zumkehr (SUI)	3	2	1	5	4	3	1.333	131	110	1.191	Round of 16
3	Borger – Büthe (GER)	3	1	2	4	2	4	0.500	104	117	0.889	Lucky losers
4	van der Vlist – van Gestel (NED)	3	0	3	3	1	6	0.167	105	137	0.766	

Source: FIVB

7 August 2016; 15:30	Bansley – Pavan (Canada)	2–0	(Netherlands) van der Vlist – van Gestel	Copacabana Stadium, Rio de Janeiro; Referees: Osvaldo Sumavil (ARG), Charalampos Papadogoulas (GRE)
7 August 2016; 15:30	(21–15, 21–17); Report			Copacabana Stadium, Rio de Janeiro; Referees: Osvaldo Sumavil (ARG), Charalampos Papadogoulas (GRE)

7 August 2016; 21:00	Borger – Büthe (Germany)	0–2	(Switzerland) Heidrich – Zumkehr	Copacabana Stadium, Rio de Janeiro; Referees: Juan Saavedra (COL), José Padron (ESP)
7 August 2016; 21:00	(12–21, 16–21); Report			Copacabana Stadium, Rio de Janeiro; Referees: Juan Saavedra (COL), José Padron (ESP)

9 August 2016; 21:00	Borger – Büthe (Germany)	2–0	(Netherlands) van der Vlist – van Gestel	Copacabana Stadium, Rio de Janeiro; Attendance: 8,625; Referees: Carlos Rodríguez (PUR), Daniel Apol (USA)
9 August 2016; 21:00	(21–19, 21–14); Report			Copacabana Stadium, Rio de Janeiro; Attendance: 8,625; Referees: Carlos Rodríguez (PUR), Daniel Apol (USA)

10 August 2016; 00:00	Bansley – Pavan (Canada)	2–0	(Switzerland) Heidrich – Zumkehr	Copacabana Stadium, Rio de Janeiro; Attendance: 6,580; Referees: Elizir de Oliveira (BRA), Davide Crescentini (ITA)
10 August 2016; 00:00	(21–18, 21–18); Report			Copacabana Stadium, Rio de Janeiro; Attendance: 6,580; Referees: Elizir de Oliveira (BRA), Davide Crescentini (ITA)

11 August 2016; 18:30	Heidrich – Zumkehr (Switzerland)	2–1	(Netherlands) van der Vlist – van Gestel	Copacabana Stadium, Rio de Janeiro; Attendance: 8,722; Referees: Osvaldo Sumavil (ARG), Roman Pristovakin (RUS)
11 August 2016; 18:30	(17–21, 21–11, 15–8); Report			Copacabana Stadium, Rio de Janeiro; Attendance: 8,722; Referees: Osvaldo Sumavil (ARG), Roman Pristovakin (RUS)

11 August 2016; 22:00	Bansley – Pavan (Canada)	2–0	(Germany) Borger – Büthe	Copacabana Stadium, Rio de Janeiro; Attendance: 7,741; Referees: Daniel Apol (USA), Elzir De Oliveira (BRA)
11 August 2016; 22:00	(21–19, 21–15); Report			Copacabana Stadium, Rio de Janeiro; Attendance: 7,741; Referees: Daniel Apol (USA), Elzir De Oliveira (BRA)

=== Pool F ===
Pos	Team	Pld	W	L	Pts	SW	SL	SR	SPW	SPL	SPR	Qualification
1	Bawden – Clancy (AUS)	3	3	0	6	6	1	6.000	145	102	1.422	Round of 16
2	Meppelink – Van Iersel (NED)	3	2	1	5	5	2	2.500	144	121	1.190	Round of 16
3	Agudo – Pazo (VEN)	3	1	2	4	2	4	0.500	93	119	0.782	Lucky losers
4	Alfaro – C. Charles (CRC)	3	0	3	3	0	6	0.000	96	126	0.762	

Source: FIVB

6 August 2016; 17:00	Bawden – Clancy (Australia)	2–0	(Costa Rica) Alfaro – C. Charles	Copacabana Stadium, Rio de Janeiro; Referees: Giovanni Bake (RSA), Lucie Guillemette (CAN)
6 August 2016; 17:00	(21–15, 21–14); Report			Copacabana Stadium, Rio de Janeiro; Referees: Giovanni Bake (RSA), Lucie Guillemette (CAN)

6 August 2016; 18:30	Meppelink – Van Iersel (Netherlands)	2–0	(Venezuela) Agudo – Pazo	Copacabana Stadium, Rio de Janeiro; Attendance: 8,384; Referees: Kritsada Panaseri (THA), Davide Crescentini (ITA)
6 August 2016; 18:30	(21–17, 21–11); Report			Copacabana Stadium, Rio de Janeiro; Attendance: 8,384; Referees: Kritsada Panaseri (THA), Davide Crescentini (ITA)

8 August 2016; 17:30	Meppelink – Van Iersel (Netherlands)	2–0	(Costa Rica) Alfaro – C. Charles	Copacabana Stadium, Rio de Janeiro; Attendance: 8,593; Referees: Mariko Satomi (JPN), Roman Pristovakin (RUS)
8 August 2016; 17:30	(21–16, 21–16); Report			Copacabana Stadium, Rio de Janeiro; Attendance: 8,593; Referees: Mariko Satomi (JPN), Roman Pristovakin (RUS)

8 August 2016; 23:00	Bawden – Clancy (Australia)	2–0	(Venezuela) Agudo – Pazo	Copacabana Stadium, Rio de Janeiro; Attendance: 8,272; Referees: Giovanni Bake (RSA), Roman Pristovakin (RUS)
8 August 2016; 23:00	(21–9, 21–14); Report			Copacabana Stadium, Rio de Janeiro; Attendance: 8,272; Referees: Giovanni Bake (RSA), Roman Pristovakin (RUS)

10 August 2016; 16:00	Meppelink – Van Iersel (Netherlands)	1–2	(Australia) Bawden – Clancy	Copacabana Stadium, Rio de Janeiro; Attendance: 3,448; Referees: Mário Ferro (BRA), Roman Pristovakin (RUS)
10 August 2016; 16:00	(25–27, 21–18, 14–16); Report			Copacabana Stadium, Rio de Janeiro; Attendance: 3,448; Referees: Mário Ferro (BRA), Roman Pristovakin (RUS)

10 August 2016; 18:30	Alfaro – C. Charles (Costa Rica)	0–2	(Venezuela) Agudo – Pazo	Copacabana Stadium, Rio de Janeiro; Attendance: 8,577; Referees: Kritsada Panaseri (THA), Daniel Apol (USA)
10 August 2016; 18:30	(16–21, 19–21); Report			Copacabana Stadium, Rio de Janeiro; Attendance: 8,577; Referees: Kritsada Panaseri (THA), Daniel Apol (USA)

=== Lucky losers ===
The table below shows the ranking of third-placed teams in the preliminary round. The top two teams will advance to next round automatically. The other teams will compete for the two remaining spots. The third-ranked team will play with the sixth-ranked team, and the fourth-ranked team will play with the fifth-ranked team.

Pos	Team	Pld	W	L	Pts	SW	SL	SR	SPW	SPL	SPR	Qualification
1	Menegatti – Giombini (ITA)	3	1	2	4	4	4	1.000	138	128	1.078	Round of 16
2	Forrer – Vergé-Dépré (SUI)	3	1	2	4	4	5	0.800	165	171	0.965	Round of 16
3	Hermannová – Sluková (CZE)	3	1	2	4	3	5	0.600	132	145	0.910	Lucky loser playoffs
4	Borger – Büthe (GER)	3	1	2	4	2	4	0.500	104	117	0.889	Lucky loser playoffs
5	Agudo – Pazo (VEN)	3	1	2	4	2	4	0.500	93	119	0.782	Lucky loser playoffs
6	Birlova – Ukolova (RUS)	3	1	2	4	2	5	0.400	126	141	0.894	Lucky loser playoffs

Source: FIVB

==== Lucky loser playoffs ====
12 August 2016; 00:00	Hermannová – Sluková (Czech Republic)	1–2	(Russia) Birlova – Ukolova	Copacabana Stadium Court 1, Rio de Janeiro; Referees: Mário Ferro (BRA), Lucie Guillemette (CAN)
12 August 2016; 00:00	(19–21, 21–12, 10–15); Report			Copacabana Stadium Court 1, Rio de Janeiro; Referees: Mário Ferro (BRA), Lucie Guillemette (CAN)

12 August 2016; 00:00	Borger – Büthe (Germany)	2–0	(Venezuela) Agudo – Pazo	Copacabana Stadium, Rio de Janeiro; Attendance: 2,641; Referees: Elzir De Oliveira (BRA), Mariko Satomi (JPN)
12 August 2016; 00:00	(21–13, 21–8); Report			Copacabana Stadium, Rio de Janeiro; Attendance: 2,641; Referees: Elzir De Oliveira (BRA), Mariko Satomi (JPN)

== Knockout stage ==
- All times are Brasília Time (UTC−03:00).

The round of sixteen pair up were determined by drawing of lots. The six first ranked teams in preliminary pools were separated automatically. Then, the lucky loser playoffs winners were drawn. The two best third ranked were drawn next. And, the last drawing belonged to the second ranked teams. The teams in the same pool from preliminary round could not meet in round of 16.

Round of 16
12 August
Larissa – Talita (BRA)	2
Borger – Büthe (GER)	0
13 August
Meppelink – Van Iersel (NED)	1
Heidrich – Zumkehr (SUI)	2
13 August
Bansley – Pavan (CAN)	2
Broder – Valjas (CAN)	0
13 August
Forrer – Vergé-Dépré (SUI)	0
Ludwig – Walkenhorst (GER)	2
12 August
Ross – Walsh Jennings (USA)	2
Menegatti – Giombini (ITA)	0
13 August
Brzostek – Kołosińska (POL)	1
Bawden – Clancy (AUS)	2
12 August
Wang – Yue (CHN)	0
Ágatha – Bárbara (BRA)	2
12 August
Birlova – Ukolova (RUS)	2
Elsa – Liliana (ESP)	0

Quarter-finals
14 August
Larissa – Talita (BRA)	2
Heidrich – Zumkehr (SUI)	1
14 August
Bansley – Pavan (CAN)	0
Ludwig – Walkenhorst (GER)	2
14 August
Ross – Walsh Jennings (USA)	2
Bawden – Clancy (AUS)	0
14 August
Ágatha – Bárbara (BRA)	2
Birlova – Ukolova (RUS)	0

Semi-finals
16 August
Larissa – Talita (BRA)	0
Ludwig – Walkenhorst (GER)	2
16 August
Ross – Walsh Jennings (USA)	0
Ágatha – Bárbara (BRA)	2

Gold medal
17 August
Ludwig – Walkenhorst (GER)	2
Ágatha – Bárbara (BRA)	0
Bronze medal
17 August
Larissa – Talita (BRA)	1
Ross – Walsh Jennings (USA)	2

=== Round of 16 ===
12 August 2016; 11:00	Wang – Yue (China)	0–2	(Brazil) Ágatha – Bárbara	Copacabana Stadium, Rio de Janeiro; Referees: Carlos Rodríguez (PUR), Osvaldo Sumavil (ARG)
12 August 2016; 11:00	(12–21, 16–21); Report			Copacabana Stadium, Rio de Janeiro; Referees: Carlos Rodríguez (PUR), Osvaldo Sumavil (ARG)

12 August 2016; 16:00	Larissa – Talita (Brazil)	2–0	(Germany) Borger – Büthe	Copacabana Stadium, Rio de Janeiro; Attendance: 7,843; Referees: Davide Crescentini (ITA), Lucie Guillemette (CAN)
12 August 2016; 16:00	(21–17, 21–19); Report			Copacabana Stadium, Rio de Janeiro; Attendance: 7,843; Referees: Davide Crescentini (ITA), Lucie Guillemette (CAN)

12 August 2016; 19:00	Birlova – Ukolova (Russia)	2–0	(Spain) Elsa – Liliana	Copacabana Stadium, Rio de Janeiro; Attendance: 5,439; Referees: Elzir De Oliveira (BRA), Giovanni Bake (RSA)
12 August 2016; 19:00	(23–21, 24–22); Report			Copacabana Stadium, Rio de Janeiro; Attendance: 5,439; Referees: Elzir De Oliveira (BRA), Giovanni Bake (RSA)

12 August 2016; 23:59	Ross – Walsh Jennings (United States)	2–0	(Italy) Menegatti – Giombini	Copacabana Stadium, Rio de Janeiro; Attendance: 8,599; Referees: Mariko Satomi (JPN), Kritsada Panaseri (THA)
12 August 2016; 23:59	(21–10, 21–16); Report			Copacabana Stadium, Rio de Janeiro; Attendance: 8,599; Referees: Mariko Satomi (JPN), Kritsada Panaseri (THA)

13 August 2016; 12:00	Bansley – Pavan (Canada)	2–0	(Canada) Broder – Valjas	Copacabana Stadium, Rio de Janeiro; Attendance: 7,661; Referees: Elzir De Oliveira (BRA), Giovanni Bake (RSA)
13 August 2016; 12:00	(21–16, 21–11); Report			Copacabana Stadium, Rio de Janeiro; Attendance: 7,661; Referees: Elzir De Oliveira (BRA), Giovanni Bake (RSA)

13 August 2016; 15:00	Forrer – Vergé-Dépré (Switzerland)	0–2	(Germany) Ludwig – Walkenhorst	Copacabana Stadium, Rio de Janeiro; Referees: Lucie Guillemette (CAN), Mariko Satomi (JPN)
13 August 2016; 15:00	(19–21, 10–21); Report			Copacabana Stadium, Rio de Janeiro; Referees: Lucie Guillemette (CAN), Mariko Satomi (JPN)

13 August 2016; 20:00	Meppelink – Van Iersel (Netherlands)	1–2	(Switzerland) Heidrich – Zumkehr	Copacabana Stadium, Rio de Janeiro; Attendance: 8,297; Referees: Mário Ferro (BRA), Carlos Rodríguez (PUR)
13 August 2016; 20:00	(21–19, 13–21, 10–15); Report			Copacabana Stadium, Rio de Janeiro; Attendance: 8,297; Referees: Mário Ferro (BRA), Carlos Rodríguez (PUR)

13 August 2016; 23:00	Brzostek – Kołosińska (Poland)	1–2	(Australia) Bawden – Clancy	Copacabana Stadium, Rio de Janeiro; Attendance: 7,052; Referees: Osvaldo Sumavil (ARG), Daniel Apol (USA)
13 August 2016; 23:00	(21–15, 16–21, 11–15); Report			Copacabana Stadium, Rio de Janeiro; Attendance: 7,052; Referees: Osvaldo Sumavil (ARG), Daniel Apol (USA)

=== Quarterfinals ===
14 August 2016; 16:00	Bansley – Pavan (Canada)	0–2	(Germany) Ludwig – Walkenhorst	Copacabana Stadium, Rio de Janeiro; Referees: Wang Lijun (CHN), Mário Ferro (BRA)
14 August 2016; 16:00	(14–21, 14–21); Report			Copacabana Stadium, Rio de Janeiro; Referees: Wang Lijun (CHN), Mário Ferro (BRA)

14 August 2016; 17:00	Larissa – Talita (Brazil)	2–1	(Switzerland) Heidrich – Zumkehr	Copacabana Stadium, Rio de Janeiro; Attendance: 8,961; Referees: Roman Pristovakin (RUS), Mariko Satomi (JPN)
14 August 2016; 17:00	(21–23, 27–25, 15–13); Report			Copacabana Stadium, Rio de Janeiro; Attendance: 8,961; Referees: Roman Pristovakin (RUS), Mariko Satomi (JPN)

14 August 2016; 23:00	Ágatha – Bárbara (Brazil)	2–0	(Russia) Birlova – Ukolova	Copacabana Stadium, Rio de Janeiro; Attendance: 8,500; Referees: Davide Crescentini (ITA), Juan Saavedra (COL)
14 August 2016; 23:00	(23–21, 21–16); Report			Copacabana Stadium, Rio de Janeiro; Attendance: 8,500; Referees: Davide Crescentini (ITA), Juan Saavedra (COL)

14 August 2016; 23:59	Ross – Walsh Jennings (United States)	2–0	(Australia) Bawden – Clancy	Copacabana Stadium, Rio de Janeiro; Attendance: 8,500; Referees: Elzir De Oliveira (BRA), Osvaldo Sumavil (ARG)
14 August 2016; 23:59	(21–14, 21–16); Report			Copacabana Stadium, Rio de Janeiro; Attendance: 8,500; Referees: Elzir De Oliveira (BRA), Osvaldo Sumavil (ARG)

=== Semifinals ===
16 August 2016; 16:00	Larissa – Talita (Brazil)	0–2	(Germany) Ludwig – Walkenhorst	Copacabana Stadium, Rio de Janeiro; Attendance: 8,045; Referees: Daniel Apol (USA), José Padron (ESP)
16 August 2016; 16:00	(18–21, 12–21); Report			Copacabana Stadium, Rio de Janeiro; Attendance: 8,045; Referees: Daniel Apol (USA), José Padron (ESP)

16 August 2016; 23:59	Ross – Walsh Jennings (United States)	0–2	(Brazil) Ágatha – Bárbara	Copacabana Stadium, Rio de Janeiro; Attendance: 8,654; Referees: Juan Saavedra (COL), Wang Lijun (CHN)
16 August 2016; 23:59	(20–22, 18–21); Report			Copacabana Stadium, Rio de Janeiro; Attendance: 8,654; Referees: Juan Saavedra (COL), Wang Lijun (CHN)

=== Bronze medal game ===
17 August 2016; 22:00	Larissa – Talita (Brazil)	1–2	(United States) Ross – Walsh Jennings	Copacabana Stadium, Rio de Janeiro; Attendance: 4,217; Referees: Charalampos Papadogoulas (GRE), Wang Lijun (CHN)
17 August 2016; 22:00	(21–17, 17–21, 9–15); Report			Copacabana Stadium, Rio de Janeiro; Attendance: 4,217; Referees: Charalampos Papadogoulas (GRE), Wang Lijun (CHN)

=== Gold medal game ===
17 August 2016; 23:59	Ludwig – Walkenhorst (Germany)	2–0	(Brazil) Ágatha – Bárbara	Copacabana Stadium, Rio de Janeiro; Attendance: 8,667; Referees: José Padron (ESP), Roman Pristovakin (RUS)
17 August 2016; 23:59	(21–18, 21–14); Report			Copacabana Stadium, Rio de Janeiro; Attendance: 8,667; Referees: José Padron (ESP), Roman Pristovakin (RUS)

== Final ranking ==
Rank	Team	Seed
1st place, gold medalist(s)	Ludwig – Walkenhorst (GER)	4
2nd place, silver medalist(s)	Ágatha – Bárbara (BRA)	2
3rd place, bronze medalist(s)	Ross – Walsh Jennings (USA)	3
4	Larissa – Talita (BRA)	1
5	Bansley – Pavan (CAN)	5
5	Bawden – Clancy (AUS)	7
5	Heidrich – Zumkehr (SUI)	17
5	Birlova – Ukolova (RUS)	24
9	Meppelink – Van Iersel (NED)	6
9	Borger – Büthe (GER)	7
9	Menegatti – Giombini (ITA)	9
9	Forrer – Vergé-Dépré (SUI)	10
9	Elsa – Liliana (ESP)	11
9	Brzostek – Kołosińska (POL)	12
9	Wang – Yue (CHN)	15
9	Broder – Valjas (CAN)	16
17	Agudo – Pazo (VEN)	19
17	Hermannová – Sluková (CZE)	23
19	Fendrick – Sweat (USA)	13
19	Gallay – Klug (ARG)	14
19	Alfaro – C. Charles (CRC)	18
19	van der Vlist – van Gestel (NED)	20
19	Elghobashy – Nada (EGY)	21
19	Artacho Del Solar – Laird (AUS)	22

== See also ==
- Beach volleyball at the 2016 Summer Olympics – Men's tournament
