= Volleyball at the 2015 European Games – Qualification =

Volleyball competitions at the 2015 European Games

A total of 464 athletes will compete at the volleyball competitions at the 2015 European Games; 336 in indoor volleyball and 128 in beach volleyball. Most of the qualification places will be based on the CEV Rankings as of 1 January 2015.

== Qualification summary ==
Country	Indoor		Beach		Total athletes
Country	Men	Women	Men	Women	Total athletes
Austria			2	2	8
Azerbaijan	X	X	2	2	36
Belarus			1		2
Belgium	X	X			28
Bulgaria	X	X			28
Croatia		X			14
Czech Republic			1	2	6
Denmark			1		2
Estonia			1		2
Finland	X			2	18
France	X		2	2	22
Germany	X	X	2	2	36
Great Britain			1		2
Greece			1	1	4
Israel			1		2
Italy	X	X	2	2	36
Latvia			2		4
Lithuania				1	2
Netherlands		X	2	2	22
Norway			2	2	8
Poland	X	X	2	2	36
Romania		X			14
Russia	X	X	2	2	36
Serbia	X	X			28
Slovakia	X			1	16
Spain			2	2	8
Sweden				2	4
Switzerland			2	2	8
Turkey	X	X	1		30
Ukraine				1	2
30 NOC's	12	12	32	32	464

== Indoor ==
=== Men ===
Means of qualification	Vacancies	Qualified
Host nation	1	Azerbaijan
CEV European Ranking (as of 1 January 2015)	9	Russia; Italy; Serbia; Poland; Bulgaria; Germany; France; Finland; Belgium
CEV European League Ranking List (2011–2014)	2	Slovakia; Turkey
Total	12	

=== Women ===
Means of qualification	Vacancies	Qualified
Host nation	1	Azerbaijan
CEV European Ranking (as of 1 January 2015)	9	Russia; Serbia; Italy; Turkey; Germany; Netherlands; Poland; Belgium; Croatia
CEV European League Ranking List (2011–2014)	2	Bulgaria; Romania
Total	12	

== Beach ==
=== Men ===
Means of qualification	Vacancies	Nation	Athletes	Athletes at Games
Host nation	2	Azerbaijan		
Host nation	2	Azerbaijan		
CEV Entry Ranking (as of 1 January 2015)	30	Poland	Grzegorz Fijalek/Mariusz Prudel	
CEV Entry Ranking (as of 1 January 2015)	30	Italy	Paolo Nicolai/Daniele Lupo	
CEV Entry Ranking (as of 1 January 2015)	30	Latvia	Aleksandrs Samoilovs/Janis Smedins	
CEV Entry Ranking (as of 1 January 2015)	30	Germany	Jonathan Erdmann/Kay Matysik	
CEV Entry Ranking (as of 1 January 2015)	30	Netherlands	Jon Stiekema/Christiaan Varenhorst	
CEV Entry Ranking (as of 1 January 2015)	30	Russia	Konstantin Semenov/Viacheslav Krasilnikov	
CEV Entry Ranking (as of 1 January 2015)	30	Spain	Pablo Herrera Allepuz/Adrián Gavira Collado	
CEV Entry Ranking (as of 1 January 2015)	30	Germany	Alexander Walkenhorst/Stefan Windscheif	
CEV Entry Ranking (as of 1 January 2015)	30	Switzerland	Philip Gabathuler/Mirvo Gerson	
CEV Entry Ranking (as of 1 January 2015)	30	Austria	Clemens Doppler/Alexander Horst	
CEV Entry Ranking (as of 1 January 2015)	30	Poland	Michal Kadziola/Jakub Szalankiewicz	
CEV Entry Ranking (as of 1 January 2015)	30	Netherlands	Alexander Brouwer/Robert Meeuwsen	
CEV Entry Ranking (as of 1 January 2015)	30	France	Youssef Krou/Edouard Rowlandson	
CEV Entry Ranking (as of 1 January 2015)	30	Turkey	Volkan Gögtepe/Murat Giginoglu	
CEV Entry Ranking (as of 1 January 2015)	30	Austria	Alexander Huber/Robin Seidl	
CEV Entry Ranking (as of 1 January 2015)	30	Greece	Kotsilianos Georgios/Zoupani Nikos	
CEV Entry Ranking (as of 1 January 2015)	30	Spain	Alfredo Marco Francisco/Christian García	
CEV Entry Ranking (as of 1 January 2015)	30	Italy	Matteo Ingrosso/Paolo Ingrosso	
CEV Entry Ranking (as of 1 January 2015)	30	Norway	Andreas Horrem Iver/Geir Eithun	
CEV Entry Ranking (as of 1 January 2015)	30	Switzerland	Sebastian Chevallier/Alexei Strasser	
CEV Entry Ranking (as of 1 January 2015)	30	Latvia	Martins Plavins/Aleksandrs Solovejs	
CEV Entry Ranking (as of 1 January 2015)	30	Russia	Nikita Liamin/Dmitri Barsouk	
CEV Entry Ranking (as of 1 January 2015)	30	Belarus	Aliaksandr Dziadkou/Aliaksandr Kavalenka	
CEV Entry Ranking (as of 1 January 2015)	30	Israel	Ariel Hilman/Sean Faiga	
CEV Entry Ranking (as of 1 January 2015)	30	Denmark	Peter Kildegaard Andersen/Martin Olesen	Peter Kildegaard Andersen/Kristoffer Abell
CEV Entry Ranking (as of 1 January 2015)	30	Norway	Øivind Hordvik/Bjarte Usken	
CEV Entry Ranking (as of 1 January 2015)	30	Great Britain	Jake Sheaf/Chris Gregory	
CEV Entry Ranking (as of 1 January 2015)	30	France	Yannick Salvetti/Jean-Baptiste Daguerre	
CEV Entry Ranking (as of 1 January 2015)	30	Czech Republic	Robert Kufa/Jan Dumek	
CEV Entry Ranking (as of 1 January 2015)	30	Estonia	Kristo Kollo/Rivo Vesik	
Total	32			

=== Women ===
Means of qualification	Vacancies	Nation	Athletes	Athletes at Games
Host nation	2	Azerbaijan		
Host nation	2	Azerbaijan		
CEV Entry Ranking (as of 1 January 2015)	30	Germany	Katrin Holtwick/Ilka Semmler	
CEV Entry Ranking (as of 1 January 2015)	30	Czech Republic	Kristyna Kolocova/Marketa Slukova	
CEV Entry Ranking (as of 1 January 2015)	30	Spain	Liliana Fernández/Elsa Baquerizo	
CEV Entry Ranking (as of 1 January 2015)	30	Germany	Karla Borger/Britta Büthe	
CEV Entry Ranking (as of 1 January 2015)	30	Netherlands	Madelein Meppelink/Marleen van Iersel	
CEV Entry Ranking (as of 1 January 2015)	30	Italy	Marta Menegatti/Viktoria Orsi Toth	
CEV Entry Ranking (as of 1 January 2015)	30	Slovakia	Natalia Dubovcova/Dominika Nestarcova	
CEV Entry Ranking (as of 1 January 2015)	30	Switzerland	Nadine Zumkehr/Joana Heidrich	
CEV Entry Ranking (as of 1 January 2015)	30	Switzerland	Tanja Goricanec/Tanja Hüberli	
CEV Entry Ranking (as of 1 January 2015)	30	Poland	Monika Brzostek/Kinga Kolosinska	
CEV Entry Ranking (as of 1 January 2015)	30	Czech Republic	Martina Bonnerová/Barbora Hermannová	
CEV Entry Ranking (as of 1 January 2015)	30	Russia	Evgenia Ukolova/Maria Prokopeva	
CEV Entry Ranking (as of 1 January 2015)	30	Russia	Ekaterina Syrtseva/Alexandra Moiseeva	
CEV Entry Ranking (as of 1 January 2015)	30	Finland	Taru Lahti/Riikka Lehtonen	
CEV Entry Ranking (as of 1 January 2015)	30	Greece	Vassiliki Arvaniti/Maria Tsiartsiani	
CEV Entry Ranking (as of 1 January 2015)	30	Sweden	Nina Grawender/Karin Lundqvist	
CEV Entry Ranking (as of 1 January 2015)	30	Italy	Giulia Momoli/Laura Giombini	
CEV Entry Ranking (as of 1 January 2015)	30	Lithuania	Ieva Dumbauskaite/Monika Povilaityte	
CEV Entry Ranking (as of 1 January 2015)	30	Austria	Barbara Hensel/Stefanie Schwaiger	
CEV Entry Ranking (as of 1 January 2015)	30	Austria	Katharina Schützenhöfer/Lena Plesiutschnig	
CEV Entry Ranking (as of 1 January 2015)	30	Norway	Janne Kongshavn/Victoria Faye Kjølberg	
CEV Entry Ranking (as of 1 January 2015)	30	Finland	Essi Hasu/Anniina Parkkinen	
CEV Entry Ranking (as of 1 January 2015)	30	Spain	Ángela Lobato/Paula Soria	
CEV Entry Ranking (as of 1 January 2015)	30	Netherlands	Rimke Braakman/Jantine van der Vlist	
CEV Entry Ranking (as of 1 January 2015)	30	France	Melinda Adelin/Laura Longuet	
CEV Entry Ranking (as of 1 January 2015)	30	Sweden	Camilla Nilsson/Tadva Yoken	
CEV Entry Ranking (as of 1 January 2015)	30	Norway	Cindy Treland/Janne Pedersen	
CEV Entry Ranking (as of 1 January 2015)	30	Ukraine	Inna Makhno/Diana Mulenko	
CEV Entry Ranking (as of 1 January 2015)	30	France	Deborah Giaoul/Mathilde Giordano	
CEV Entry Ranking (as of 1 January 2015)	30	Poland	Karolina Baran/Jagoda Gruszczynska	
Total	32			

== Sources ==
- Indoor Volleyball Qualifiers
