= 2020 European Beach Volleyball Championships =

Volleyball competition held in Latvia

2020 European Beach Volleyball Championship
Tournament details
- Host country: Latvia
- Dates: 15–20 September
- Teams: 64

The 2020 European Beach Volleyball Championship is a 2020 edition of European Beach Volleyball Championship which is a unisex competition of national teams which took place from 15 to 20 September 2020 in Jūrmala in Latvia. The draw consisted of 32 men's & 32 women's teams, with 100,000 EUR prize money per gender.

== Medal events ==
=== Medal table ===
* Host nation (Latvia)

Rank	Nation	Gold	Silver	Bronze	Total
1	Norway (NOR)	1	0	0	1
1	Switzerland (SUI)	1	0	0	1
3	Russia (RUS)	0	1	1	2
4	Germany (GER)	0	1	0	1
5	Italy (ITA)	0	0	1	1
Totals (5 entries)		2	2	2	6

=== Medal summary ===
Event	Gold	Silver	Bronze
Men	Norway; Anders Mol; Christian Sørum	Russia; Viacheslav Krasilnikov; Oleg Stoyanovskiy	Italy; Paolo Nicolai; Daniele Lupo
Women	Switzerland; Joana Heidrich; Anouk Vergé-Dépré	Germany; Kim Behrens; Cinja Tillmann	Russia; Nadezda Makroguzova; Svetlana Kholomina

== Men's tournament ==
=== Preliminary round ===
==== Pool A ====
Pos	Team	Pld	W	L	Pts	SW	SL	SR	SPW	SPL	SPR	Qualification
1	(Norway) A. Mol–Sørum	2	2	0	4	4	0	MAX	89	63	1.413	Round of 16
2	(Latvia) A. Samoilovs–Šmēdiņš	2	1	1	3	2	2	1.000	68	77	0.883	Round of 24
3	(Austria) Huber–Dressler	2	1	1	3	2	3	0.667	90	104	0.865	Round of 24
4	(Estonia) Nõlvak–Tiisaar	2	0	2	2	1	4	0.250	99	102	0.971	

Date	Time		Score		Set 1	Set 2	Set 3	Total	Report
16 Sep	12:00	A. Mol–Sørum (Norway)	2–0	(Austria) Huber–Dressler	21–13	26–24		47–37	
16 Sep	12:00	A. Samoilovs–Šmēdiņš (Latvia)	2–0	(Estonia) Nõlvak–Tiisaar	21–17	21–18		42–35	
18 Sep	08:30	A. Mol–Sørum (Norway)	2–0	(Latvia) A. Samoilovs–Šmēdiņš	21–14	21–12		42–26	
18 Sep	10:10	Huber–Dressler (Austria)	2–1	(Estonia) Nõlvak–Tiisaar	22–24	21–14	19–17	62–55	

==== Pool B ====
Pos	Team	Pld	W	L	Pts	SW	SL	SR	SPW	SPL	SPR	Qualification
1	(Russia) Krasilnikov–Stoyanovskiy	2	2	0	4	4	1	4.000	104	87	1.195	Round of 16
2	(Poland) Kantor–Łosiak	2	1	1	3	3	2	1.500	99	96	1.031	Round of 24
3	(France) Aye–Gauthier-Rat	2	1	1	3	2	3	0.667	86	90	0.956	Round of 24
4	(Latvia) Bedrītis–Reliņš	2	0	2	2	1	4	0.250	78	94	0.830	

Date	Time		Score		Set 1	Set 2	Set 3	Total	Report
16 Sep	10:00	Krasilnikov–Stoyanovskiy (Russia)	2–0	(Latvia) Bedrītis–Reliņš	21–15	21–15		42–30	
16 Sep	10:00	Kantor–Łosiak (Poland)	2–0	(France) Aye–Gauthier-Rat	21–18	21–16		42–34	
18 Sep	08:30	Krasilnikov–Stoyanovskiy (Russia)	2–1	(Poland) Kantor–Łosiak	21–16	24–26	17–15	62–57	
18 Sep	10:10	Bedrītis–Reliņš (Latvia)	1–2	(France) Aye–Gauthier-Rat	15–21	21–16	12–15	48–52	

==== Pool C ====
Pos	Team	Pld	W	L	Pts	SW	SL	SR	SPW	SPL	SPR	Qualification
1	(Netherlands) Varenhorst–van de Velde	2	2	0	4	4	1	4.000	100	87	1.149	Round of 16
2	(Germany) Thole–Wickler	2	1	1	3	3	2	1.500	96	82	1.171	Round of 24
3	(Poland) Bryl–Miszczuk	2	1	1	3	2	3	0.667	86	96	0.896	Round of 24
4	(Latvia) Solovejs–M. Samoilovs	2	0	2	2	1	4	0.250	78	95	0.821	

Date	Time		Score		Set 1	Set 2	Set 3	Total	Report
16 Sep	11:00	Thole–Wickler (Germany)	2–0	(Latvia) Solovejs–M. Samoilovs	21–11	21–13		42–24	
16 Sep	11:00	Varenhorst–van de Velde (Netherlands)	2–0	(Poland) Bryl–Miszczuk	21–14	21–19		42–33	
18 Sep	09:20	Thole–Wickler (Germany)	1–2	(Netherlands) Varenhorst–van de Velde	18–21	24–22	12–15	54–58	
18 Sep	11:00	Solovejs–M. Samoilovs (Latvia)	1–2	(Poland) Bryl–Miszczuk	21–16	19–21	14–16	54–53	

==== Pool D ====
Pos	Team	Pld	W	L	Pts	SW	SL	SR	SPW	SPL	SPR	Qualification
1	(Latvia) Pļaviņš–Točs	2	2	0	4	4	0	MAX	85	71	1.197	Round of 16
2	(Austria) Doppler–Horst	2	1	1	3	2	2	1.000	80	77	1.039	Round of 24
3	(Belgium) Koekelkoren–van Walle	2	1	1	3	2	2	1.000	77	72	1.069	Round of 24
4	(Czech Republic) Dumek–Bercik	2	0	2	2	0	4	0.000	64	86	0.744	

Date	Time		Score		Set 1	Set 2	Set 3	Total	Report
16 Sep	13:00	Pļaviņš–Točs (Latvia)	2–0	(Belgium) Koekelkoren–van Walle	21–16	21–19		42–35	
16 Sep	13:00	Dumek–Bercik (Czech Republic)	0–2	(Austria) Doppler–Horst	13–21	21–23		34–44	
18 Sep	09:20	Pļaviņš–Točs (Latvia)	2–0	(Austria) Doppler–Horst	22–20	21–16		43–36	
18 Sep	11:00	Koekelkoren–van Walle (Belgium)	2–0	(Czech Republic) Dumek–Bercik	21–18	21–12		42–30	

==== Pool E ====
Pos	Team	Pld	W	L	Pts	SW	SL	SR	SPW	SPL	SPR	Qualification
1	(Switzerland) Heidrich–Gerson	2	2	0	4	4	1	4.000	95	90	1.056	Round of 16
2	(Belarus) Dziadkou–Piatrushka	2	1	1	3	2	3	0.667	85	92	0.924	Round of 24
3	(Italy) Nicolai–Lupo	2	1	1	3	3	3	1.000	105	92	1.141	Round of 24
4	(Germany) Dollinger–Winter	2	0	2	2	2	4	0.500	97	108	0.898	

Date	Time		Score		Set 1	Set 2	Set 3	Total	Report
16 Sep	11:00	Heidrich–Gerson (Switzerland)	2–1	(Germany) Dollinger–Winter	21–17	16–21	16–14	53–52	
16 Sep	13:00	Nicolai–Lupo (Italy)	1–2	(Belarus) Dziadkou–Piatrushka	21–11	17–21	12–15	50–47	
18 Sep	09:20	Dziadkou–Piatrushka (Belarus)	0–2	(Switzerland) Heidrich–Gerson	19–21	19–21		38–42	
18 Sep	11:00	Nicolai–Lupo (Italy)	2–1	(Germany) Dollinger–Winter	19–21	21–17	15–7	55–45	

==== Pool F ====
Pos	Team	Pld	W	L	Pts	SW	SL	SR	SPW	SPL	SPR	Qualification
1	(Russia) Lyamin–Myskiv	2	2	0	4	4	2	2.000	108	99	1.091	Round of 16
2	(Netherlands) Brouwer–Meeuwsen	2	1	1	3	3	2	1.500	95	77	1.234	Round of 24
3	(Germany) Bergmann–L. Pfretzschner	2	1	1	3	3	2	1.500	93	97	0.959	Round of 24
4	(Latvia) Jirgensons–Aišpurs	2	0	2	2	0	4	0.000	66	89	0.742	

Date	Time		Score		Set 1	Set 2	Set 3	Total	Report
16 Sep	10:00	Lyamin–Myskiv (Russia)	2–1	(Germany) Bergmann–L. Pfretzschner	18–21	21–16	15–9	54–46	
16 Sep	12:00	Brouwer–Meeuwsen (Netherlands)	2–0	(Latvia) Jirgensons–Aišpurs	21–10	21–13		42–23	
18 Sep	09:20	Brouwer–Meeuwsen (Netherlands)	1–2	(Russia) Lyamin–Myskiv	19–21	21–18	13–15	53–54	
18 Sep	10:10	Jirgensons–Aišpurs (Latvia)	0–2	(Germany) Bergmann–L. Pfretzschner	23–25	20–22		43–47	

==== Pool G ====
Pos	Team	Pld	W	L	Pts	SW	SL	SR	SPW	SPL	SPR	Qualification
1	(Norway) H. Mol–Berntsen	2	2	0	4	4	0	MAX	99	83	1.193	Round of 16
2	(Russia) Likholetov–Bykanov	2	1	1	3	2	3	0.667	104	112	0.929	Round of 24
3	(Austria) Pristauz–Hörl	2	1	1	3	3	2	1.500	97	78	1.244	Round of 24
4	(Germany) Ehlers–S. Pfretzschner	2	0	2	2	0	4	0.000	57	84	0.679	

Date	Time		Score		Set 1	Set 2	Set 3	Total	Report
16 Sep	10:00	Ehlers–S. Pfretzschner (Germany)	0–2	(Norway) H. Mol–Berntsen	16–21	16–21		32–42	
16 Sep	12:00	Likholetov–Bykanov (Russia)	2–1	(Austria) Pristauz–Hörl	12–21	21–16	20–18	53–55	
18 Sep	08:30	H. Mol–Berntsen (Norway)	2–0	(Russia) Likholetov–Bykanov	21–17	36–34		57–51	
18 Sep	10:10	Ehlers–S. Pfretzschner (Germany)	0–2	(Austria) Pristauz–Hörl	14–21	11–21		25–42	

==== Pool H ====
Pos	Team	Pld	W	L	Pts	SW	SL	SR	SPW	SPL	SPR	Qualification
1	(Spain) Herrera–Gavira	2	2	0	4	4	0	MAX	85	38	2.237	Round of 16
2	(Italy) Windisch–Carambula	2	1	1	3	2	2	1.000	80	78	1.026	Round of 24
3	(Switzerland) Krattiger–Breer	2	1	1	3	2	2	1.000	77	69	1.116	Round of 24
4	(Latvia) Rinkevičs–Gabdulļins	2	0	2	2	0	4	0.000	27	84	0.321	

Date	Time		Score		Set 1	Set 2	Set 3	Total	Report
16 Sep	11:00	Windisch–Carambula (Italy)	2–0	(Switzerland) Krattiger–Breer	21–18	21–17		42–35	
16 Sep	13:00	Herrera–Gavira (Spain)	2–0	(Latvia) Rinkevičs–Gabdulļins	21–0	21–0		42–0	
18 Sep	08:30	Windisch–Carambula (Italy)	0–2	(Spain) Herrera–Gavira	20–22	18–21		38–43	
18 Sep	11:00	Krattiger–Breer (Switzerland)	2–0	(Latvia) Rinkevičs–Gabdulļins	21–14	21–13		42–27	

=== Knockout stage ===
A draw will be held to determine the pairings.

==== Round of 24 ====
Date	Time		Score		Set 1	Set 2	Set 3	Total	Report
18 Sep	14:30	Likholetov–Bykanov (Russia)	0–2	(France) Aye–Gauthier-Rat	17–21	16–21		33–42	
18 Sep	15:20	Doppler–Horst (Austria)	0–2	(Poland) Bryl–Miszczuk	18–21	19–21		37–42	
18 Sep	14:30	Kantor–Łosiak (Poland)	2–0	(Austria) Pristauz–Hörl	21–19	21–17		42–36	
18 Sep	15:20	Thole–Wickler (Germany)	1–2	(Italy) Nicolai–Lupo	24–26	21–13	12–15	57–54	
18 Sep	15:20	Dziadkou–Piatrushka (Belarus)	0–2	(Switzerland) Krattiger–Breer	16–21	19–21		35–42	
18 Sep	15:20	A. Samoilovs–Šmēdiņš (Latvia)	2–0	(Belgium) Koekelkoren–van Walle	21–18	21–16		42–34	
18 Sep	14:30	Windisch–Carambula (Italy)	2–1	(Germany) Bergmann–L. Pfretzschner	16–21	21–17	15–10	52–48	
18 Sep	14:30	Brouwer–Meeuwsen (Netherlands)	1–2	(Austria) Huber–Dressler	21–16	17–21	12–15	50–52	

==== Round of 16 ====
Date	Time		Score		Set 1	Set 2	Set 3	Total	Report
19 Sep	10:00	A. Mol–Sørum (Norway)	2–0	(France) Aye–Gauthier-Rat	21–12	21–14		42–26	
19 Sep	11:00	Herrera–Gavira (Spain)	2–0	(Poland) Bryl–Miszczuk	21–18	21–17		42–35	
19 Sep	10:00	Heidrich–Gerson (Switzerland)	0–2	(Poland) Kantor–Łosiak	19–21	16–21		35–42	
19 Sep	10:00	Pļaviņš–Točs (Latvia)	0–2	(Italy) Nicolai–Lupo	17–21	18–21		35–42	
19 Sep	11:00	Varenhorst–van de Velde (Netherlands)	0–2	(Switzerland) Krattiger–Breer	19–21	21–23		40–44	
19 Sep	11:00	Lyamin–Myskiv (Russia)	2–0	(Latvia) A. Samoilovs–Šmēdiņš	21–18	22–20		43–38	
19 Sep	10:00	H. Mol–Berntsen (Norway)	2–1	(Italy) Windisch–Carambula	12–21	21–16	15–10	48–47	
19 Sep	11:00	Krasilnikov–Stoyanovskiy (Russia)	2–0	(Austria) Huber–Dressler	21–14	21–19		42–33	

==== Quarterfinals ====
Date	Time		Score		Set 1	Set 2	Set 3	Total	Report
19 Sep	17:00	A. Mol–Sørum (Norway)	2–0	(Spain) Herrera–Gavira	21–16	21–16		42–32	
19 Sep	15:00	Kantor–Łosiak (Poland)	1–2	(Italy) Nicolai–Lupo	19–21	21–19	16–18	56–58	
19 Sep	16:00	Krattiger–Breer (Switzerland)	0–2	(Russia) Lyamin–Myskiv	15–21	18–21		33–42	
19 Sep	17:00	H. Mol–Berntsen (Norway)	0–2	(Russia) Krasilnikov–Stoyanovskiy	14–21	9–21		23–42	

==== Semifinals ====
Date	Time		Score		Set 1	Set 2	Set 3	Total	Report
20 Sep	12:30	A. Mol–Sørum (Norway)	2–0	(Italy) Nicolai–Lupo	27–25	21–19		48–44	
20 Sep	13:45	Lyamin–Myskiv (Russia)	0–2	(Russia) Krasilnikov–Stoyanovskiy	17–21	16–21		33–42	

==== Third place game ====
Date	Time		Score		Set 1	Set 2	Set 3	Total	Report
20 Sep	17:30	Nicolai–Lupo (Italy)	2–1	(Russia) Lyamin–Myskiv	17–21	23–21	15–12	55–54	

==== Final ====
Date	Time		Score		Set 1	Set 2	Set 3	Total	Report
20 Sep	19:00	A. Mol–Sørum (Norway)	2–0	(Russia) Krasilnikov–Stoyanovskiy	21–19	21–15		42–34	

== Women's tournament ==
=== Preliminary round ===
==== Pool A ====
Pos	Team	Pld	W	L	Pts	SW	SL	SR	SPW	SPL	SPR	Qualification
1	(Switzerland) Hüberli–Betschart	2	2	0	4	4	0	MAX	84	57	1.474	Round of 16
2	(Spain) Soria–Carro	2	1	1	3	2	2	1.000	67	82	0.817	Round of 24
3	(Poland) Brzostek–Gromadowska	2	1	1	3	2	2	1.000	79	80	0.988	Round of 24
4	(Poland) Ceynowa–Kociołek	1	0	1	1	0	4	0.000	78	89	0.876	

Date	Time		Score		Set 1	Set 2	Set 3	Total	Report
15 Set	12:00	Hüberli–Betschart (Switzerland)	2–0	(Poland) Brzostek–Gromadowska	21–18	21–16		42–34	
15 Set	12:00	Ceynowa–Kociołek (Poland)	0–2	(Spain) Soria–Carro	19–21	21–23		40–44	
16 Set	14:00	Hüberli–Betschart (Switzerland)	2–0	(Spain) Soria–Carro	21–15	21–8		42–23	
16 Set	14:00	Brzostek–Gromadowska (Poland)	2–0	(Poland) Ceynowa–Kociołek	24–22	21–16		45–38	

==== Pool B ====
Pos	Team	Pld	W	L	Pts	SW	SL	SR	SPW	SPL	SPR	Qualification
1	(Germany) Kozuch–Ludwig	2	2	0	4	4	0	MAX	84	47	1.787	Round of 16
2	(Russia) Birlova–Ukolova	2	1	1	3	2	2	1.000	77	67	1.149	Round of 24
3	(Czech Republic) Kubíčková–Kvapilová	2	1	1	3	2	2	1.000	70	77	0.909	Round of 24
4	(Latvia) Ozoliņa–Skrastiņa	2	0	2	2	0	4	0.000	44	84	0.524	

Date	Time		Score		Set 1	Set 2	Set 3	Total	Report
15 Set	16:00	Kozuch–Ludwig (Germany)	2–0	(Latvia) Ozoliņa–Skrastiņa	21–7	21–16		42–23	
15 Set	16:00	Birlova–Ukolova (Russia)	0–2	(Czech Republic) Kubíčková–Kvapilová	12–21	23–25		35–46	
16 Set	16:00	Kozuch–Ludwig (Germany)	2–0	(Czech Republic) Kubíčková–Kvapilová	21–12	21–12		42–24	
16 Set	16:00	Ozoliņa–Skrastiņa (Latvia)	0–2	(Russia) Birlova–Ukolova	13–21	8–21		21–42	

==== Pool C ====
Pos	Team	Pld	W	L	Pts	SW	SL	SR	SPW	SPL	SPR	Qualification
1	(Germany) Bieneck–Schneider	2	2	0	4	4	2	2.000	110	99	1.111	Round of 16
2	(Switzerland) Heidrich–Vergé-Dépré	2	1	1	3	3	2	1.500	93	90	1.033	Round of 24
3	(Russia) Bocharova–Voronina	2	1	1	3	3	2	1.500	90	83	1.084	Round of 24
4	(Austria) N. Strauss–T. Strauss	2	0	2	2	0	4	0.000	63	84	0.750	

Date	Time		Score		Set 1	Set 2	Set 3	Total	Report
15 Set	12:00	Heidrich–Vergé-Dépré (Switzerland)	2–0	(Austria) N. Strauss–T. Strauss	21–14	21–18		42–32	
15 Set	17:00	Bieneck–Schneider (Germany)	2–1	(Russia) Bocharova–Voronina	21–18	16–21	15–9	52–48	
16 Set	16:00	Heidrich–Vergé-Dépré (Switzerland)	1–2	(Germany) Bieneck–Schneider	17–21	24–22	10–15	51–58	
16 Set	16:00	N. Strauss–T. Strauss (Austria)	0–2	(Russia) Bocharova–Voronina	18–21	13–21		31–42	

==== Pool D ====
Pos	Team	Pld	W	L	Pts	SW	SL	SR	SPW	SPL	SPR	Qualification
1	(Russia) Makroguzova–Kholomina	2	2	0	4	4	0	MAX	84	61	1.377	Round of 16
2	(Netherlands) van Iersel–Ypma	2	1	1	3	2	2	1.000	75	73	1.027	Round of 24
3	(Poland) Gruszczyńska–Wachowicz	2	1	1	3	2	2	1.000	81	94	0.862	Round of 24
4	(Finland) Sinisalo–Parkkinen	2	0	2	2	1	4	0.250	83	95	0.874	

Date	Time		Score		Set 1	Set 2	Set 3	Total	Report
15 Set	16:00	Makroguzova–Kholomina (Russia)	2–0	(Poland) Gruszczyńska–Wachowicz	21–17	21–11		42–28	
15 Set	14:00	Sinisalo–Parkkinen (Finland)	0–2	(Netherlands) van Iersel–Ypma	17–21	14–21		31–42	
16 Set	14:00	Makroguzova–Kholomina (Russia)	2–0	(Netherlands) van Iersel–Ypma	21–15	21–18		42–33	
16 Set	15:00	Gruszczyńska–Wachowicz (Poland)	2–1	(Finland) Sinisalo–Parkkinen	15–21	21–16	17–15	53–52	

==== Pool E ====
Pos	Team	Pld	W	L	Pts	SW	SL	SR	SPW	SPL	SPR	Qualification
1	(Latvia) Kravčenoka–Graudiņa	2	2	0	4	4	1	4.000	97	75	1.293	Round of 16
2	(Russia) Dabizha–Rudykh	2	1	1	3	3	3	1.000	100	108	0.926	Round of 24
3	(Finland) Lehtonen–Ahtiainen	2	1	1	3	2	2	1.000	73	76	0.961	Round of 24
4	(Austria) Schützenhöfer–Plesiutschnig	2	0	2	2	1	4	0.250	87	98	0.888	

Date	Time		Score		Set 1	Set 2	Set 3	Total	Report
15 Sep	17:00	Kravčenoka–Graudiņa (Latvia)	2–0	(Finland) Lehtonen–Ahtiainen	21–14	21–14		42–28	
15 Sep	19:00	Schützenhöfer–Plesiutschnig (Austria)	1–2	(Russia) Dabizha–Rudykh	19–21	21–17	13–15	53–53	
16 Sep	17:00	Lehtonen–Ahtiainen (Finland)	2–0	(Austria) Schützenhöfer–Plesiutschnig	21–12	24–22		45–34	
16 Sep	19:00	Kravčenoka–Graudiņa (Latvia)	2–1	(Russia) Dabizha–Rudykh	21–16	19–21	15–10	55–47	

==== Pool F ====
Pos	Team	Pld	W	L	Pts	SW	SL	SR	SPW	SPL	SPR	Qualification
1	(Czech Republic) Hermannová–Sluková	2	2	0	4	4	0	MAX	84	66	1.273	Round of 16
2	(Italy) Menegatti–Orsi Toth	2	1	1	3	2	2	1.000	80	83	0.964	Round of 24
3	(France) Jupiter–Chamereau	2	1	1	3	2	2	1.000	83	79	1.051	Round of 24
4	(Latvia) Namiķe–Brailko	2	0	2	2	0	4	0.000	65	84	0.774	

Date	Time		Score		Set 1	Set 2	Set 3	Total	Report
15 Sep	14:00	Menegatti–Orsi Toth (Italy)	2–0	(France) Jupiter–Chamereau	21–18	25–23		46–41	
15 Sep	18:00	Hermannová–Sluková (Czech Republic)	2–0	(Latvia) Namiķe–Brailko	21–16	21–16		42–32	
16 Sep	17:00	Hermannová–Sluková (Czech Republic)	2–0	(Italy) Menegatti–Orsi Toth	21–19	21–15		42–34	
16 Sep	18:00	Namiķe–Brailko (Latvia)	0–2	(France) Jupiter–Chamereau	17–21	16–21		33–42	

==== Pool G ====
Pos	Team	Pld	W	L	Pts	SW	SL	SR	SPW	SPL	SPR	Qualification
1	(Netherlands) Keizer–Meppelink	2	2	0	4	4	0	MAX	84	64	1.313	Round of 16
2	(Spain) A. Fernández–Lobato	2	1	1	3	2	2	1.000	76	73	1.041	Round of 24
3	(Germany) Behrens–Tillmann	2	1	1	3	2	2	1.000	73	75	0.973	Round of 24
4	(Latvia) Briede–Paegle	2	0	2	2	0	4	0.000	63	84	0.750	

Date	Time		Score		Set 1	Set 2	Set 3	Total	Report
15 Sep	13:00	Behrens–Tillmann (Germany)	0–2	(Spain) A. Fernández–Lobato	19–21	12–21		31–42	
15 Sep	17:00	Keizer–Meppelink (Netherlands)	2–0	(Latvia) Briede–Paegle	21–13	21–17		42–30	
16 Sep	17:00	Keizer–Meppelink (Netherlands)	2–0	(Spain) A. Fernández–Lobato	21–18	21–16		42–34	
16 Sep	17:00	Briede–Paegle (Latvia)	0–2	(Germany) Behrens–Tillmann	15–21	18–21		33–42	

==== Pool H ====
Pos	Team	Pld	W	L	Pts	SW	SL	SR	SPW	SPL	SPR	Qualification
1	(Spain) L. Fernández–Baquerizo	2	2	0	4	4	1	4.000	101	89	1.135	Round of 16
2	(France) Placette–Richard	2	1	1	3	2	3	0.667	92	89	1.034	Round of 24
3	(Germany) Ittlinger–Laboureur	2	1	1	3	3	2	1.500	89	89	1.000	Round of 24
4	(Norway) Lunde–Hjortland	2	0	2	2	1	4	0.250	86	101	0.851	

Date	Time		Score		Set 1	Set 2	Set 3	Total	Report
15 Sep	13:00	L. Fernández–Baquerizo (Spain)	2–1	(Norway) Lunde–Hjortland	22–20	20–22	17–15	59–57	
15 Sep	13:00	Ittlinger–Laboureur (Germany)	1–2	(France) Placette–Richard	16–21	26–24	5–15	47–60	
16 Sep	15:00	L. Fernández–Baquerizo (Spain)	2–0	(France) Placette–Richard	21–18	21–14		42–32	
16 Sep	15:00	Lunde–Hjortland (Norway)	0–2	(Germany) Ittlinger–Laboureur	12–21	17–21		29–42	

=== Knockout stage ===
A draw will be held to determine the pairings.

==== Round of 24 ====
Date	Time		Score		Set 1	Set 2	Set 3	Total	Report
18 Sep	12:45	Dabizha–Rudykh (Russia)	0–2	(Germany) Behrens–Tillmann	18–21	13–21		31–42	
18 Sep	12:45	Soria–Carro (Spain)	1–2	(Finland) Lehtonen–Ahtiainen	22–20	12–21	11–15	45–56	
18 Sep	12:45	Menegatti–Orsi Toth (Italy)	2–1	(Russia) Bocharova–Voronina	23–21	13–21	15–12	51–54	
18 Sep	12:45	Kubíčková–Kvapilová (Czech Republic)	0–2	(France) Jupiter–Chamereau	18–21	24–26		42–47	
18 Sep	12:00	Placette–Richard (France)	0–2	(Poland) Brzostek–Gromadowska	17–21	23–25		40–46	
18 Sep	12:00	van Iersel–Ypma (Netherlands)	2–1	(Russia) Birlova–Ukolova	21–23	21–14	15–10	57–47	
18 Sep	12:00	Heidrich–Vergé-Dépré (Switzerland)	2–0	(Poland) Gruszczyńska–Wachowicz	21–17	21–10		42–27	
18 Sep	12:00	A. Fernández–Lobato (Spain)	0–2	(Germany) Ittlinger–Laboureur	14–21	19–21		33–42	

==== Round of 16 ====
Date	Time		Score		Set 1	Set 2	Set 3	Total	Report
18 Sep	17:10	Hüberli–Betschart (Switzerland)	0–2	(Germany) Behrens–Tillmann	18–21	15–21		33–42	
18 Sep	17:10	L. Fernández–Baquerizo (Spain)	1–2	(Finland) Lehtonen–Ahtiainen	21–13	19–21	15–17	55–51	
18 Sep	17:10	Kravčenoka–Graudiņa (Latvia)	0–2	(Italy) Menegatti–Orsi Toth	16–21	13–21		29–42	
18 Sep	17:10	Makroguzova–Kholomina (Russia)	2–0	(France) Jupiter–Chamereau	21–15	21–17		42–32	
18 Sep	16:20	Bieneck–Schneider (Germany)	2–1	(Poland) Brzostek–Gromadowska	18–21	21–16	15–10	54–47	
18 Sep	16:20	Hermannová–Sluková (Czech Republic)	2–0	(Netherlands) van Iersel–Ypma	21–13	21–10		42–23	
18 Sep	16:20	Keizer–Meppelink (Netherlands)	0–2	(Switzerland) Heidrich–Vergé-Dépré	24–26	16–21		40–47	
18 Sep	16:20	Kozuch–Ludwig (Germany)	2–0	(Germany) Ittlinger–Laboureur	21–15	21–16		42–31	

==== Quarterfinals ====
Date	Time		Score		Set 1	Set 2	Set 3	Total	Report
19 Sep	12:00	Behrens–Tillmann (Germany)	2–0	(Finland) Lehtonen–Ahtiainen	22–20	21–18		43–38	
19 Sep	13:00	Menegatti–Orsi Toth (Italy)	0–2	(Russia) Makroguzova–Kholomina	16–21	13–21		29–42	
19 Sep	14:00	Bieneck–Schneider (Germany)	1–2	(Czech Republic) Hermannová–Sluková	26–28	21–12	12–15	59–55	
19 Sep	14:00	Heidrich–Vergé-Dépré (Switzerland)	2–1	(Germany) Kozuch–Ludwig	17–21	21–16	15–4	53–41	

==== Semifinals ====
Date	Time		Score		Set 1	Set 2	Set 3	Total	Report
19 Sep	18:15	Behrens–Tillmann (Germany)	2–0	(Russia) Makroguzova–Kholomina	21–19	21–17		42–36	
19 Sep	19:15	Hermannová–Sluková (Czech Republic)	0–2	(Switzerland) Heidrich–Vergé-Dépré	11–21	17–21		28–42	

==== Third place game ====
Date	Time		Score		Set 1	Set 2	Set 3	Total	Report
20 Sep	15:00	Makroguzova–Kholomina (Russia)	2–0	(Czech Republic) Hermannová–Sluková	25–23	21–18		46–41	

==== Final ====
Date	Time		Score		Set 1	Set 2	Set 3	Total	Report
20 Sep	16:00	Behrens–Tillmann (Germany)	1–2	(Switzerland) Heidrich–Vergé-Dépré	21–18	14–21	16–18	51–57	
