= Heather Bansley =

Canadian beach volleyball player

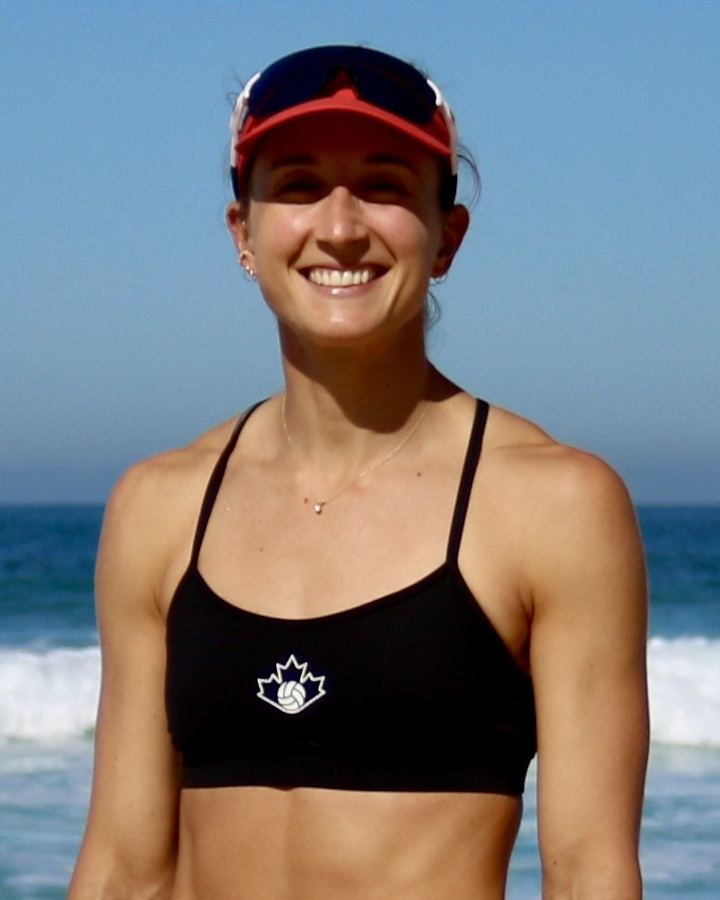
- Bansley in 2021

Personal information
- Born: September 13, 1987 (age 39); London, Ontario, Canada
- Height: 1.70 m (5 ft 7 in)
- Weight: 64 kg (141 lb)
- Education: Toronto Varsity Blues

Beach volleyball information
Years	Teammate
2013-16; 2016-21	Sarah Pavan; Brandie Wilkerson

Best results
Years	Location	Result
2018; 2018; 2018	Chetumal; Warsaw; Las Vegas	1st 1st 1st

National team
Canada

Heather Bansley (born September 13, 1987) is a Canadian beach volleyball player, playing as a left-side defender. She has been named FIVB Best Defensive Player of the World Tour in 2015, 2016 and 2018.

== University career ==
Bansley played CIS volleyball for the Toronto Varsity Blues for five seasons from 2005 to 2010 where she was a member of the 2009-10 OUA champions.

== Pro career ==
Bansley and former partner Sarah Pavan were part of the Canadian team for the 2016 Summer Olympics. After qualifying for the women's tournament, the pair competed in Pool E and won all 3 matches with a 2–0 set score. For the Round of 16 match, they were paired with the other Canadian team of Broder and Valjas, which they won in straight sets of (21–16, 21–11). They lost to Germany's Laura Ludwig and Kira Walkenhorst in straight sets of (14–21, 14–21) in the quarterfinals.

Bansley and her next partner Brandie Wilkerson first competed together at the Swatch World Tour finals in Toronto (September 13–18, 2016), where they finished 9th. In 2018, they had a break-out year and closed the season ranked No. 1 on the FIVB world tour.

Bansley and Wilkerson were named as part of the Canadian Olympic team for the 2020 Summer Olympics in Tokyo, one of the nation's two entries in the women's tournament along with the team of Bansley's former partner Pavan and Melissa Humana-Paredes. Bansley and Wilkerson struggled during pool play, recording two losses and one win, but advanced into the knockout stages due to being one of the top two "Lucky Loser" teams. In the Round of 16 they were the sixteenth seed, but unexpectedly upset the third-seeded American team of Claes/Sponcil by winning two sets to one. In the quarter-final they faced the Latvian team Kravčenoka/Graudiņa, and were eliminated after losing two sets to one.

Bansley announced her retirement in early 2022 and has joined the Canadian beach volleyball coaching staff, primarily working with their Next Gen program.

In 2023, Sophie Bukovec reached out to Bansley to pair up. They competed in their first tournament together in Edmonton in July 2023. The duo would go on to win silver at the 2024 Recife Challenge, as part of the Volleyball World Beach Pro Tour.

In June 2024, Bukovec and Bansley qualified to compete for Canada at the 2024 Summer Olympics.

Awards
Preceded by Larissa França (BRA)	Women's FIVB World Tour "Best Defender"; 2015–2016	Succeeded by Laura Ludwig (GER)
