= Taylor Wilson (volleyball) =

Canadian beach volleyball player

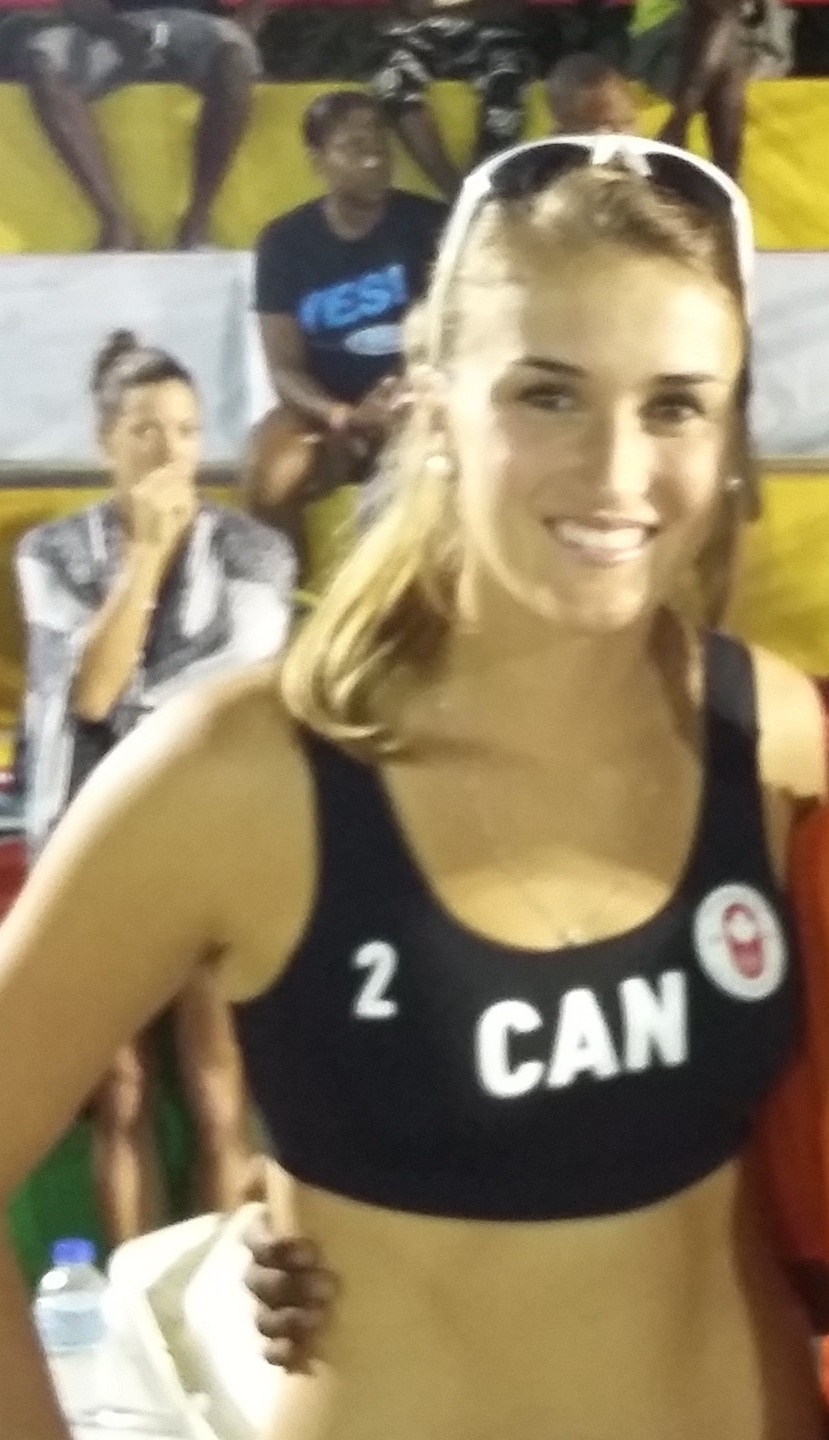
- Wilson in 2015

Personal information
- Full name: Taylor Mackenzie Wilson
- Born: Taylor Mackenzie Pischke; April 18, 1993 (age 33) Winnipeg, Manitoba, Canada
- Education: UCSB; University of Manitoba
- Height: 180 cm (5 ft 11 in)
- Weight: 69 kg (152 lb)
Beach volleyball information
Current teammate
Years	Teammate	Tours (points)
2012-2016 2017	Melissa Humana-Paredes; Kristina May	2,414.0

Taylor Mackenzie Wilson (née Pischke; born April 18, 1993) is a Canadian professional volleyball player. She has won seven Canadian national titles (four indoor volleyball and three beach volleyball), including the women's volleyball championship in 2014.

== Personal life ==
Wilson (then Pischke) was born in Winnipeg, Manitoba, Canada, to Garth Pischke, a two-time Olympian with Canada men's national volleyball team, and a former coach of the Manitoba Bisons men's team, and mother Cindy Shepherd, a Canadian Junior National team athlete and three-time U Sports National Champion. Wilson first competed in rhythmic gymnastics at the national level before taking up her parents' sport at the age of 14. She attended high school at Fort Richmond Collegiate.

She is married to the professional ice hockey player Tom Wilson. On 23rd May, 2024, they welcomed their first son, Teddy Wilson.

== University career ==
Wilson played university volleyball for the UC Santa Barbara Gauchos in the 2011–12 season. Her departure from UCSB, after one semester on the indoor team, occurred because there was no opportunity to play beach volleyball during the second semester when the NCAA sand program at UCSB did not become a collegiate sport. Wilson was on a double scholarship at UCSB to play on their indoor and beach volleyball teams. She then joined the Manitoba Bisons in time for the 2012–13 season where she finished sixth in the Canada West conference in kills per set and sixth in points per set. In the following season, she was named a Canada West Second-Team All-Star as she finished fifth in kills and points per game. That year, the Bisons lost the conference championship to the UBC Thunderbirds, but by finishing second, the team qualified for the 2014 CIS women's volleyball championship. The Bisons defeated the Ottawa Gee-Gees, Dalhousie Tigers, and finally the first-seeded UBC Thunderbirds to claim the national championship as Wilson was also named to the Championship All-Star Team.

Wilson has been the recipient of many academic awards at the University of Manitoba including Sport Manitoba's prestigious Princess Royal Pan Am Scholarships and Milt Stegall Scholarship for community service, athletics, and a cumulative GPA above 4.0. Twice she was named Manitoba's Junior Female Athlete of the Year in 2012 and 2013 and a finalist for Female Athlete of the Year in 2013, 2014, and 2015.

== 2012-16: Original team ==
Wilson played on Team Canada's beach volleyball squad with Melissa Humana-Paredes of Toronto from 2012 to 2016. John Child, who competed in three Olympic Games and won a bronze medal at the 1996 Atlanta Games, was the team's coach. Along with Humana-Paredes, Wilson won two bronze medals at the under 23 World Championship (2013 and 2014), and seven medals (3 gold, 3 silver, 1 bronze) at the NORCECA Beach Volleyball Circuit between 2013 and 2015. Both reached the semi-finals at the 2015 Pan American Games in Toronto and the 2013 Summer Universiade in Kazan, Russia.

Wilson also appeared in Sportnet Magazine's 2013 issue of "Beauty of Sport". and in 2016 was an advocate of the Dove Campaign "My Beauty My Say".

In 2015 and 2016, Wilson competed on the FIVB World Tour in eleven Grand Slam and Open events, and in 2015 reached the round of 16 and a 9th-place finish at the 2015 Beach Volleyball World Championships. She competed (Aug 23–28, 2016) in her final event with partner Melissa, at the Long Beach, California Grand Slam before resuming studies at the University of Manitoba. Playing in Pool-A they lost to Maria Antonelli/Lili BRA (21-11, 23-21) and Ross/Walsh Jennings USA (21-16, 21-17) in straight sets. Playing against Carol/Ana Patrícia of BRA they won in straight sets (21-19, 26-24), placing them 3rd in Pool-A and advancing to the elimination round. The team finished 17th overall. This marked the culmination of 11 FIVB World Tour events that they played in 2016 where they finished top 10 in four events (Vitoria Open, Xiamen Open, Hamburg Major Series, and Olsztyn Grand Slam).

== 2017-19: Multiple partners ==
In January 2017, Wilson began playing with new partner, Kristina May, who was a member of the 2016 Canadian Olympic team playing with then-partner Jamie Broder. The pair made their debut at the opening stop of the 2017 FIVB Beach Volleyball World Tour in Fort Lauderdale with a 25th-place finish.

For the 2018 season, Wilson began competition with another partner, Jamie Broder. They competed together in several competitions together during the season, with their best showing in FIVB competition being a 9th-place finish at Fort Lauderdale. In 2019, Wilson teamed up with Sophie Bukovec for the entirety of the FIVB season. Together, Wilson and Bukovec had a season best 4th-place finish at the Aydın tournament in mid-May, followed shortly thereafter with a 5th-place finish at the Bayden event just under a month later.
