= Norisbeth Agudo =

Venezuelan beach volleyball player (born 1992)

Norisbeth Isais Agudo González (born May 22, 1992) is a Venezuelan beach volleyball player. She competed alongside Olaya Pérez Pazo in the women's beach volleyball tournament at the 2016 Summer Olympics.
