= Anouk Vergé-Dépré =

Swiss beach volleyball player (born 1992)

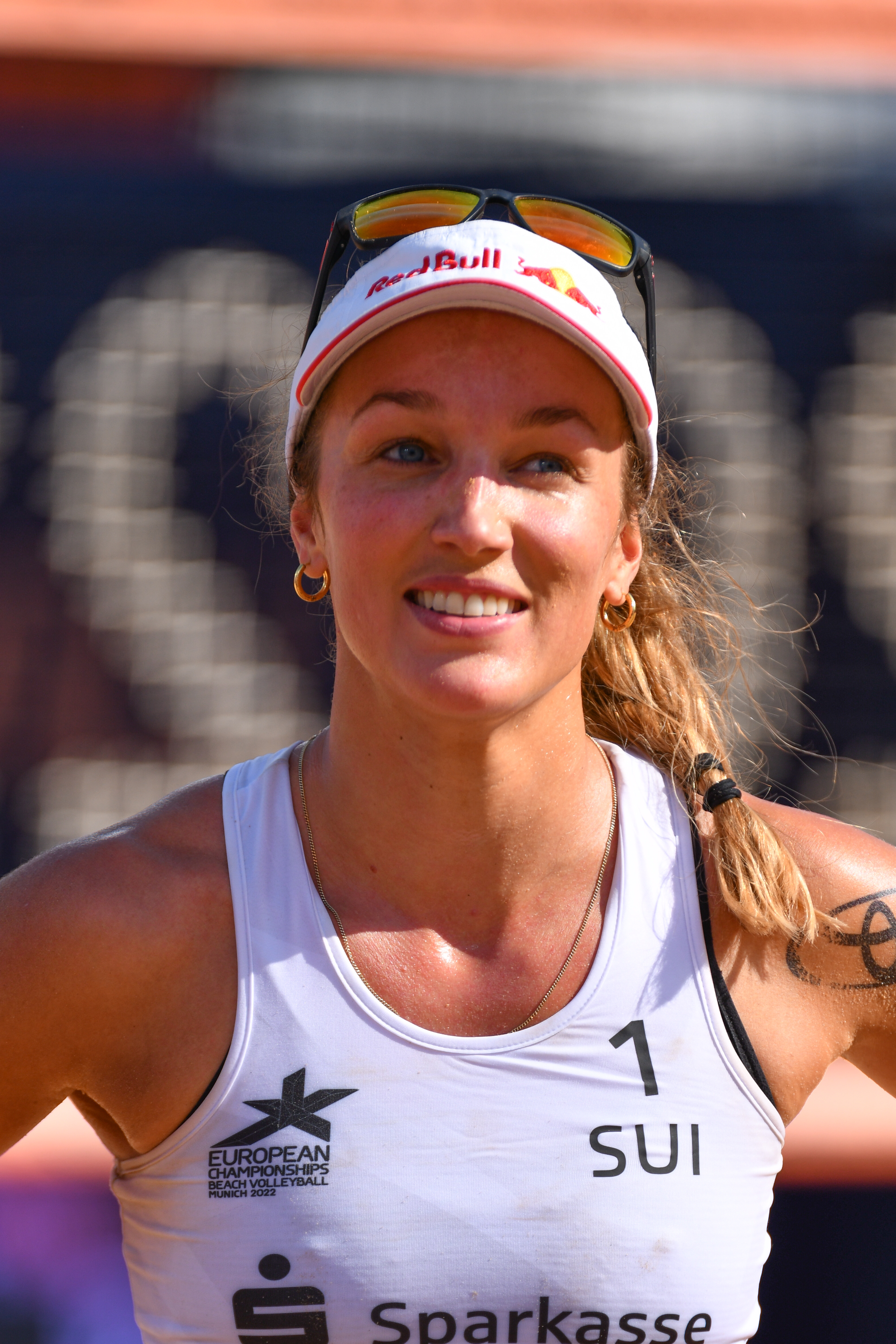
- Vergé-Dépré at the 2022 European Volleyball Championships

Personal information
- Nationality: Switzerland
- Born: 11 February 1992 (age 34); Bern, Switzerland
- Height: 1.85 m (6 ft 1 in)
- Weight: 69 kg (152 lb)
- Education: University of Fribourg

Beach volleyball information

Current teammate
Years	Teammate
2018, 2025	Zoé Vergé-Dépré

Previous teammates
Years	Teammate
2017–2024; 2011–2016	Joana Heidrich; Isabelle Forrer
Honours
Women's Beach Volleyball
Representing Switzerland
Olympic Games
Bronze medal – third place	2020 Tokyo	Beach
European Championships
Gold medal – first place	2020 Jūrmala	Beach
World Tour Finals
Bronze medal – third place	2016 Toronto	Beach
World Beach Pro Tour
Gold medal – first place	2023 Goa	Beach
Silver medal – second place	2024 Xiamen	Beach
Silver medal – second place	2024 Vienna	Beach
Bronze medal – third place	2025 Ostrava	Beach
World Tour
Gold medal – first place	2016 Xiamen	Beach
Gold medal – first place	2019 Moscow	Beach
Gold medal – first place	2021 Ostrava	Beach
Silver medal – second place	2015 Sochi	Beach
Silver medal – second place	2017 The Hague	Beach
Silver medal – second place	2018 Itapema	Beach
Silver medal – second place	2020 Baden	Beach
Silver medal – second place	2021 Ostrava	Beach
Bronze medal – third place	2015 Xiamen	Beach

Anouk Vergé-Dépré (born 11 February 1992) is a Swiss beach volleyball player. Representing her country with teammate Joana Heidrich, she won the bronze medal at the 2020 Summer Olympics and the gold medal at the 2020 European Beach Volleyball Championships. With former teammate Isabelle Forrer, she won third place at the 2016 FIVB World Tour Finals and competed at the 2016 Summer Olympics.

== Career ==
Vergé-Dépré and partner Isabelle Forrer won the Xiamen Open of the 2016 FIVB Beach Volleyball World Tour in April. Later in August, at the 2016 Summer Olympics, Vergé-Dépré and Forrer were eliminated in the round of 16 by German pair Laura Ludwig and Kira Walkenhorst. Vergé-Dépré and Forrer then competed at the 2016 World Tour Finals in Toronto and won the bronze medal. They defeated Larissa Franca and Talita Antunes of Brazil in straight sets of 21–19 and 21–18. At the close of the 2016 season, Forrer announced her retirement. Vergé-Dépré then partnered with Joana Heidrich, who was likewise left partnerless upon the retirement of Nadine Zumkehr.

Seeded No. 12 at the 2020 Summer Olympics, Vergé-Dépré and Heidrich lost the semifinal to eventual gold medalists Alix Klineman and April Ross of the USA. In the bronze medal game, they won against Latvians Anastasija Kravčenoka and Tīna Graudiņa in straight sets of 19–21 and 15–21. Vergé-Dépré and Heidrich won Switzerland's first-ever Olympic medal in women's beach volleyball.

Vergé-Dépré and Heidrich won the gold medal at the 2020 European Beach Volleyball Championships, defeating the German pair Kim Behrens and Cinja Tillmann in the final.

== Personal life ==
Her younger sister, Zoé Vergé-Dépré, is also a beach volleyball player.

Vergé-Dépré attended the University of Fribourg.
