= Olaya Pérez Pazo =

Venezuelan beach volleyball player (born 1983)

Olaya Pérez Pazo (born June 7, 1983) is a Venezuelan beach volleyball player. She competed alongside Norisbeth Agudo in the women's beach volleyball tournament at the 2016 Summer Olympics.
