= Kristina May =

Canadian beach volleyball player (born 1987)

Personal information
- Full name: Kristina Valjas May
- Born: 2 June 1987 (age 39); Toronto, Ontario, Canada
- Height: 188 cm (6 ft 2 in)
- Weight: 68 kg (150 lb)
- Education: University of Toronto

Beach volleyball information

Current teammate
Years	Teammate
2011-16; 2017	Jamie Broder; Taylor Pischke

National team
Canada

Kristina Väljas May (née Väljas, born 2 June 1987) is a Canadian beach volleyball player. She qualified to compete (along with partner Jamie Broder) at the 2016 Summer Olympics. They advanced to the round of 16 until they were eliminated, finishing in a tie for ninth place.

== Life and career ==
Valjas was born on 2 June 1987 to parents who both played varsity volleyball in university. Growing up, she competed in mountain biking and cross-country skiing. She is the older sister of skier Len Väljas. Like her parents, she played university volleyball for the Toronto Varsity Blues, before transitioning to beach volleyball, where in 2010 she became part of the national team. Valjas formed a double with Jamie Broder in 2011, and went on to win NORCECA continental titles in 2013 and 2015.

In April 2015, Valjas and Broder won an FIVB World Tour medal, becoming the first Canadian female athletes to do so.

In October 2016, she married John May, and adopted his surname. They have three sons. In 2017, May started a new team with Taylor Pischke.
