= Joana Heidrich =

Swiss beach volleyball player

Joana Mäder
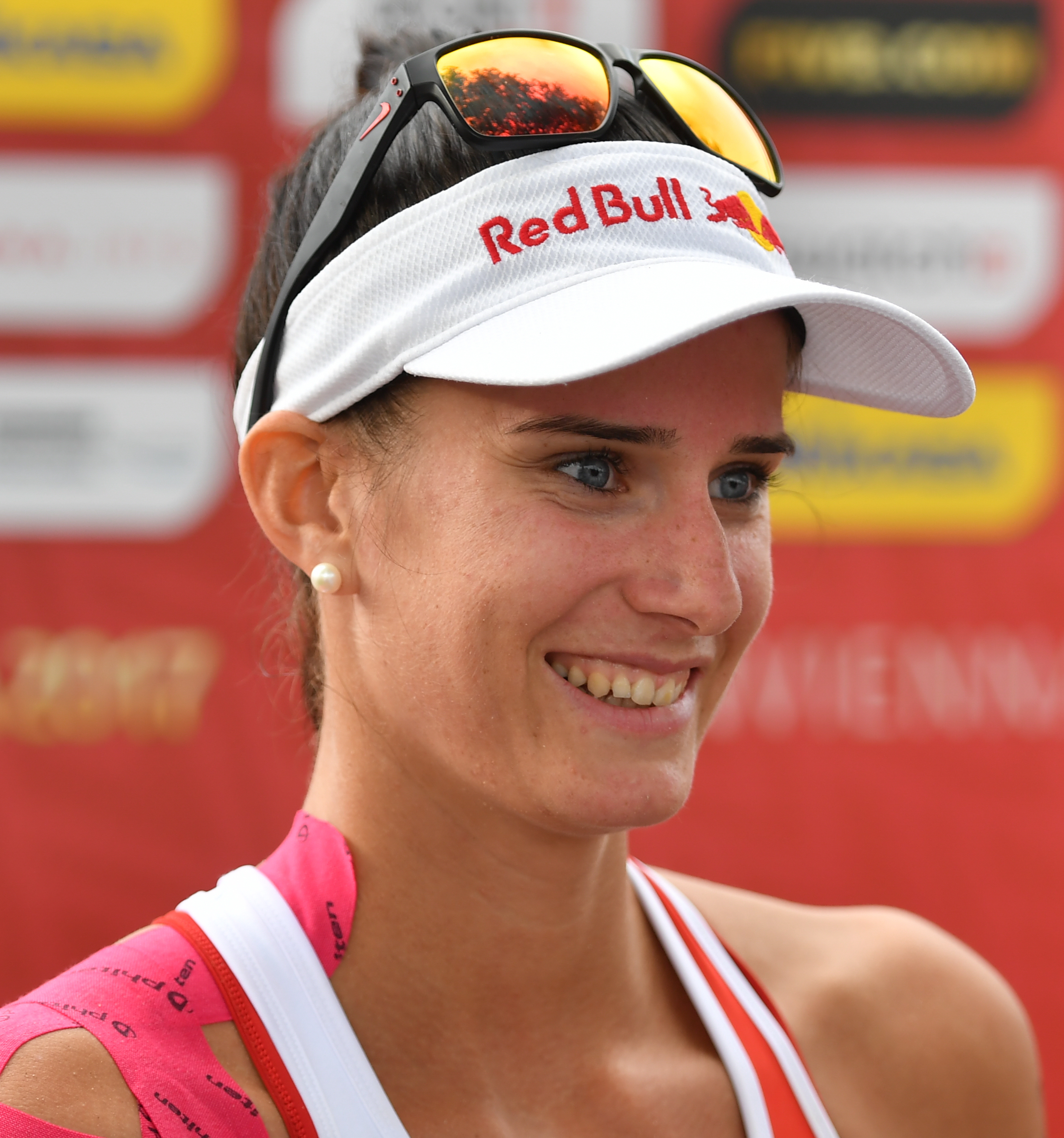
- Heidrich in 2017

Personal information
- Nationality: Swiss
- Born: 2 October 1991 (age 35); Zurich, Switzerland
- Height: 1.90 m (6 ft 3 in)
- Weight: 158 lb (72 kg)

Beach volleyball information

Current teammate
Teammate
Leona Kernen

Previous teammates
| Years | Teammate |
|---|---|
| 2013–16; 2017–2024; 2026- | Nadine Zumkehr; Anouk Vergé-Dépré; Leona Kernen |

National team
| Switzerland |
Honours
Women's beach volleyball
Representing Switzerland
Olympic Games
| Bronze medal – third place | 2020 Tokyo | Team |
European Championships
| Gold medal – first place | 2020 Jurmala | Beach |

Joana Mäder (née Heidrich; born 2 October 1991) is a Swiss beach volleyball player. She competed with Nadine Zumkehr in the 2016 Summer Olympics in Rio de Janeiro.

Following Zumkehr's retirement at the close of the 2016 season, she partnered with Anouk Vergé-Dépré, whose own former partner, Isabelle Forrer, likewise retired.

In July 2021, Heidrich and Vergé-Dépré represented Switzerland at the 2020 Summer Olympics in Tokyo and won the bronze medal.

== Professional career ==
The pair participated in the 2016 Summer Olympics with a 14th seed, as of 12 June 2016, placement. They lost against Brazil's #1 seed team of Talita Antunes and Larissa França in a match of 3 sets (21–23, 27–25, 15–13), which was also the longest match at Rio, in the quarter-final played 14 August 2016 and settled at 5th place.

=== FIVB World Tour 2016 ===
She competed with Zumkehr at the 2016 FIVB World Tour Finals in Toronto. The duo played against fellow country mates of Isabelle Forrer and Anouk Verge-Depre in the semifinals and won in 3 sets of (14–21, 21–15, 15–10). They advanced to the gold medal match against Germany's Laura Ludwig and Kira Walkenhorst but they lost to the Germans in straight sets of (18–21, 16–21) and finished with the silver medal.

== Personal life ==
She is married to ice hockey player Stefan Mäder. The couple have a daughter.

Awards
| Preceded by Linline Matauatu (VAN) | Women's FIVB World Tour "Most Improved"; 2016 | Succeeded by Melissa Humana-Paredes (CAN) |
