= Elsa Baquerizo =

Spanish beach volleyball player

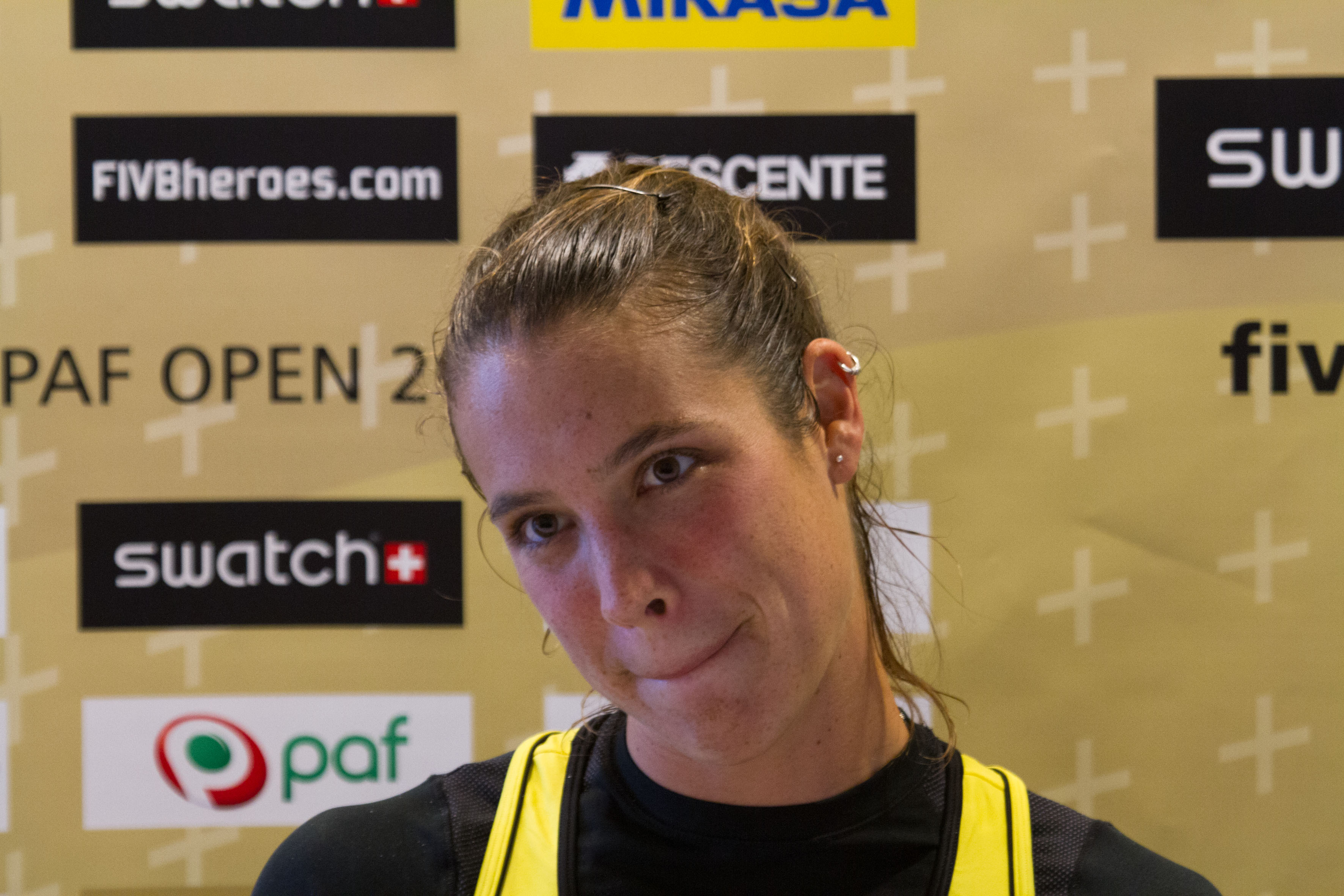
- Baquerizo in 2009

Personal information
- Full name: Elsa María Baquerizo McMillan
- Nationality: Spanish
- Born: 25 June 1987 (age 39); New York, New York, U.S.
- Height: 1.81 m (5 ft 11 in)
- Weight: 68 kg (150 lb)
Honours
Women's beach volleyball
Representing Spain
European Championships
Silver medal – second place	2013 Klagenfurt	Beach
Bronze medal – third place	2012 Scheveningen	Beach
FIVB World Tour
Silver medal – second place	2016 Long Beach, CA	Beach

Elsa María Baquerizo McMillan (Note: In this Spanish name, the first or paternal surname is Baquerizo and the second or maternal family name is McMillan.) (born 25 June 1987) is a Spanish beach volleyball player. As of 2012, she plays with Liliana Fernández. The pair participated in the 2012 Summer Olympics tournament and were eliminated in the round of 16 by the Italians Greta Cicolari and Marta Menegatti. They again competed at the 2016 Summer Olympics, losing in the last 16 to the Russian pair of Birlova and Ukolova.

== Professional career ==
=== World tour 2016 ===
Silver medal went to Liliana and Elsa at the Long Beach, California Grand Slam where they lost to April Ross/Kerri Walsh Jennings in straight sets, 21–16, 21–16.
