= Evgenia Ukolova =

Russian beach volleyball player (born 1989)

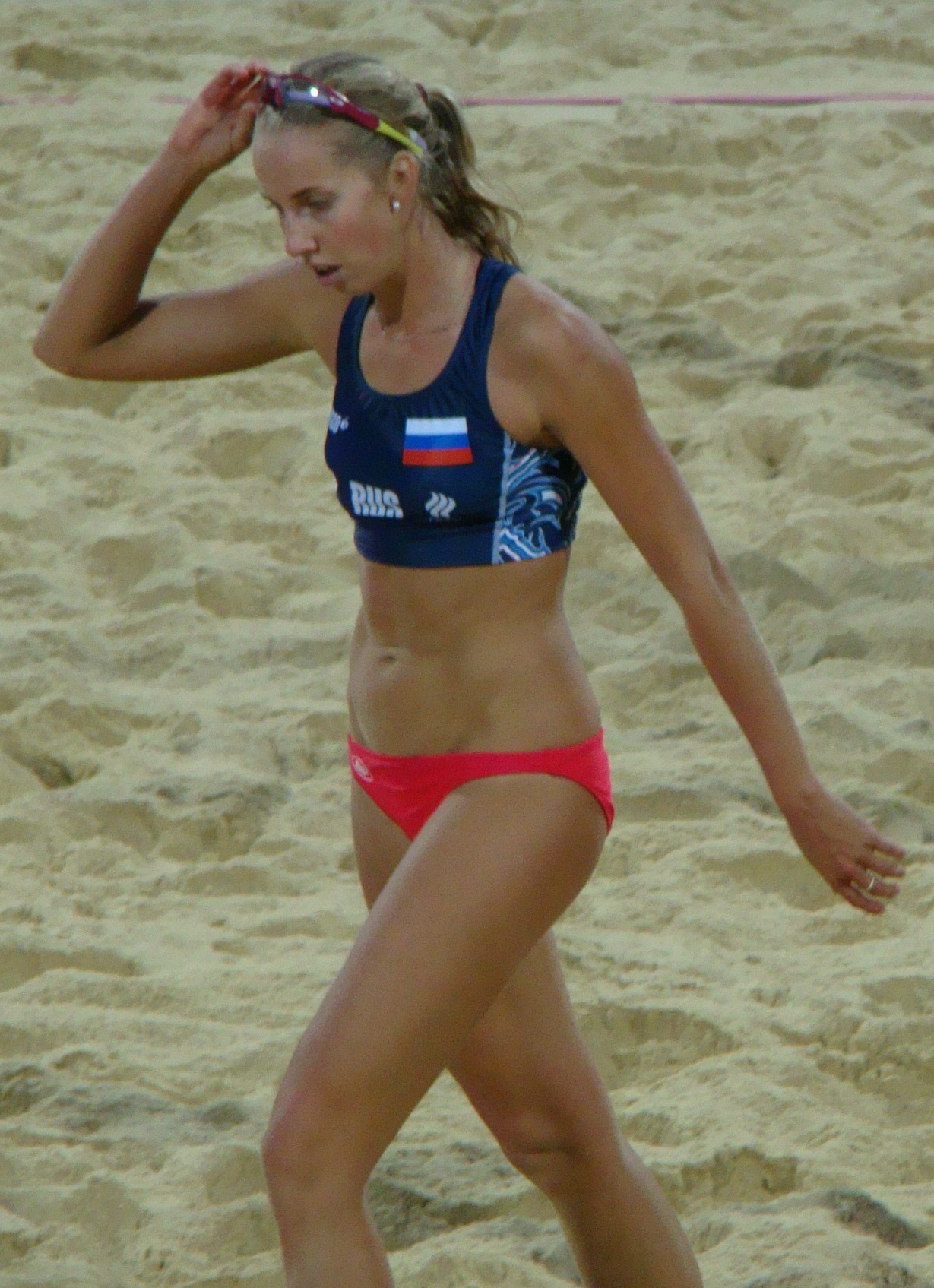
- Ukolova competing at the 2012 Summer Olympics

Personal information
- Nationality: Russian
- Born: 17 May 1989 (age 36) Moscow
- Height: 182 cm (6 ft 0 in)
- Weight: 66 kg (146 lb)

Sport
- Country: Russia
- Sport: Beach volleyball

Evgenia Nikolayevna Ukolova (Russian: Евгения Николаевна Уколова; born 17 May 1989) is a Russian beach volleyball player. As of 2012, she plays with Ekaterina Khomyakova (also known by her married name of Ekaterina Birlova). They qualified for the 2012 Summer Olympics in London and for the 2016 Summer Olympics in Rio de Janeiro.

At the 2012 Olympics, they qualified from their group but lost to the Chinese pair of Xue Chen and Zhang Xi in the first knockout round.

At the 2016 Olympics, they had to use the lucky loser route to qualify from the group stages, beating Barbora Hermannová and Markéta Sluková in the lucky loser round. In the last 16, Ukolova and Birlova beat Elsa Baquerizo and Liliana Fernández of Spain, before losing to eventual silver medalists Ágatha Bednarczuk and Bárbara Seixas in the quarterfinals.
