= Kinga Wojtasik =

Polish beach volleyball player

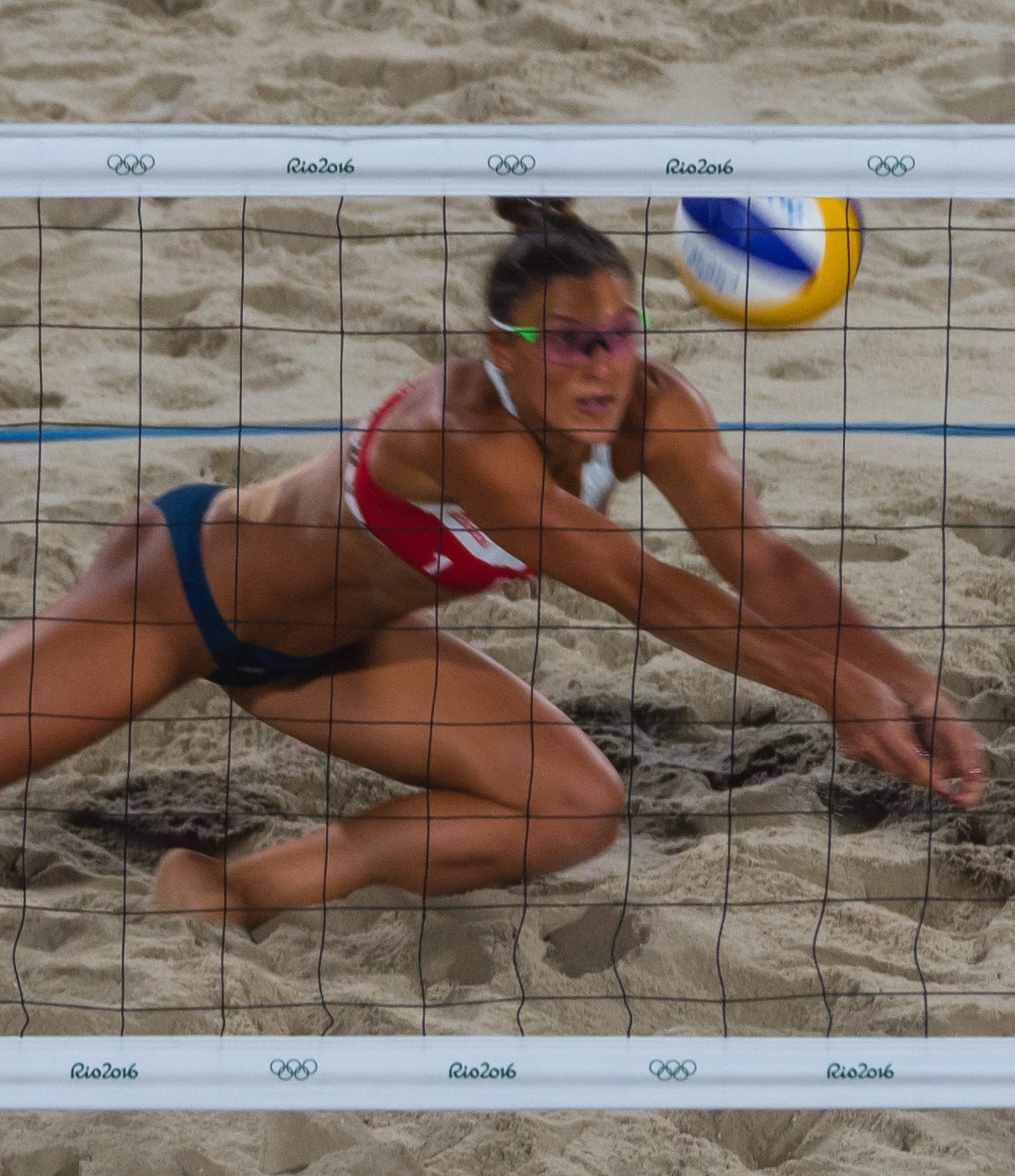
- Kołosińska at the 2016 Summer Olympics

Personal information
- Nationality: Polish
- Born: 2 June 1990 (age 36); Lublin, Poland

Beach volleyball information

Current teammate
Teammate
Monika Brzostek

Kinga Wojtasik (born 2 June 1990), née Kołosińska, is a Polish beach volleyball player. As of 2016, she plays with Monika Brzostek. They have qualified for 2016 Summer Olympics in Rio de Janeiro.
