= Isabelle Forrer =

Swiss beach volleyball player

Personal information
- Nationality: Switzerland
- Born: 28 March 1982 (age 44); St. Gallen, Switzerland
- Height: 1.78 m (5 ft 10 in)
- Weight: 64 kg (141 lb)

Best results
Years	Location	Result
2016; 2016; 2016	Xiamen; Rio Olympics; FIVB World Tour Finals	Gold; 9th Bronze

Isabelle Forrer (born 28 March 1982) is a Swiss beach volleyball player. She represented her country at the 2016 Summer Olympics with doubles partner Anouk Vergé-Dépré. Forrer and Vergé-Dépré were eliminated in the round of 16 by German pair Laura Ludwig and Kira Walkenhorst (the eventual gold medal winners). Forrer and Vergé-Dépré finished 9th. The pair competed at the 2016 World Tour Finals in Toronto and won the bronze medal. They won the bronze medal match against Larissa Franca and Talita Antunes of Brazil in straight sets (21-19, 21-18).
