= Monika Brzostek =

Polish beach volleyball player (born 1989)

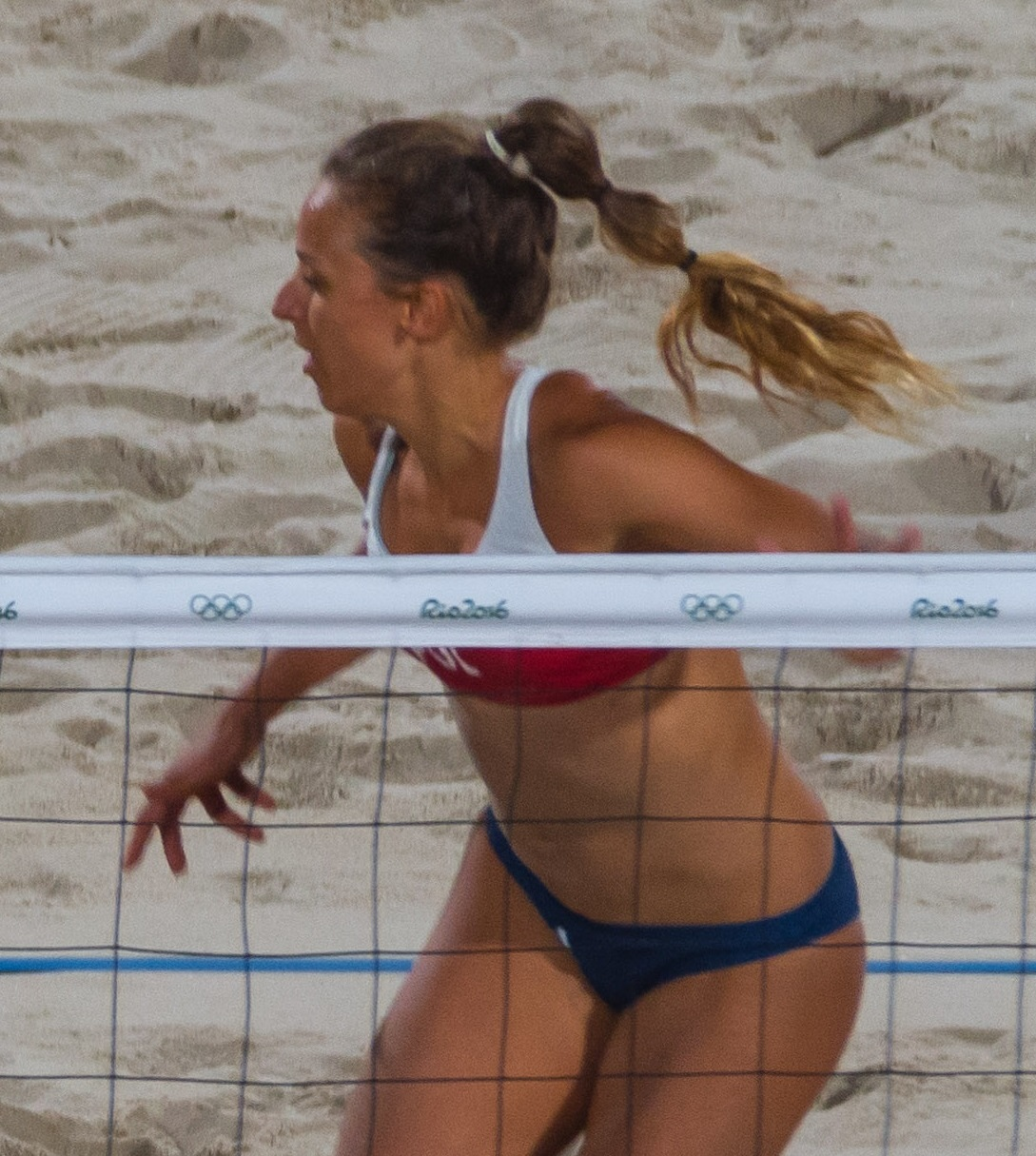
- Brzostek at the 2016 Summer Olympics

Personal information
- Nationality: Polish
- Born: 28 July 1989 (age 37); Rybnik, Poland

Beach volleyball information

Current teammate
Teammate
Kinga Kołosińska

Monika Brzostek (born 28 July 1989) is a Polish beach volleyball player. As of 2016, she plays with Kinga Kołosińska. They have qualified for 2016 Summer Olympics in Rio de Janeiro.
