= Jamie Broder =

Canadian beach volleyball player

Personal information
- Full name: Jamie Lynn Broder
- Born: June 8, 1985 (age 41); Victoria, British Columbia, Canada
- Height: 172 cm (5 ft 8 in)
- Weight: 65 kg (143 lb)
- Education: British Columbia

Beach volleyball information

Current teammate
Teammate
Kristina Valjas

National team
Canada

Jamie Lynn Broder (born June 8, 1985, in Victoria, British Columbia) is a Canadian beach volleyball player. Broder has qualified to compete (along with partner Kristina Valjas) at the 2016 Summer Olympics. They made it to the round of 16 however they paired up against the other Canadian team of Pavan and Bansley and lost in straight sets.

She played CIS volleyball with the UBC Thunderbirds for two seasons where she was a member of the 2008 CIS women's volleyball championship team.
