= Ekaterina Birlova =

Russian beach volleyball player

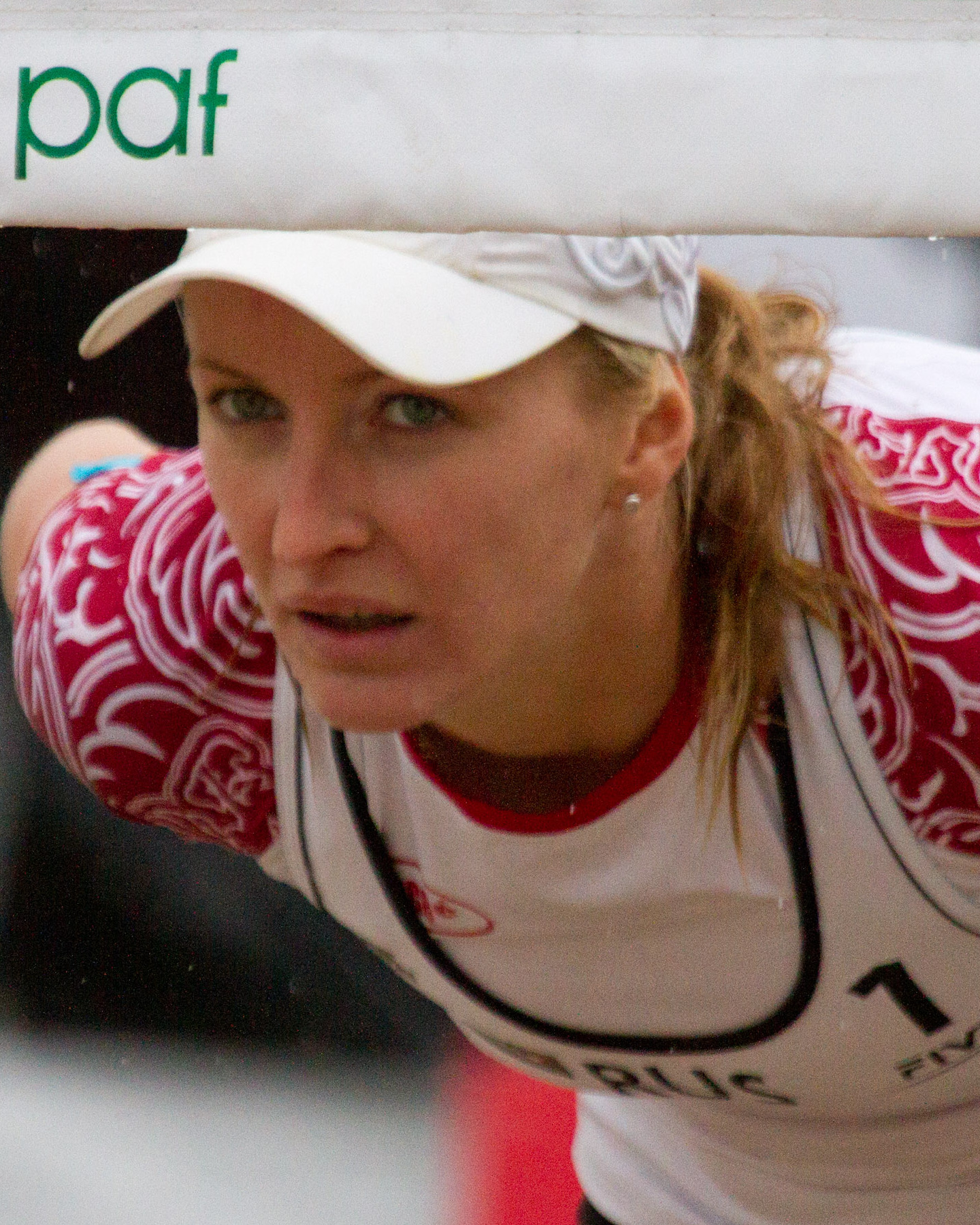
- Birlova at the Paf Open 2012

Personal information
- Full name: Ekaterina Vladimirovna Birlova
- Nationality: Russian
- Born: 11 August 1987 (age 38) Bryansk
- Height: 180 cm (5 ft 11 in)
- Weight: 64 kg (141 lb)

Sport
- Country: Russia
- Sport: Beach volleyball

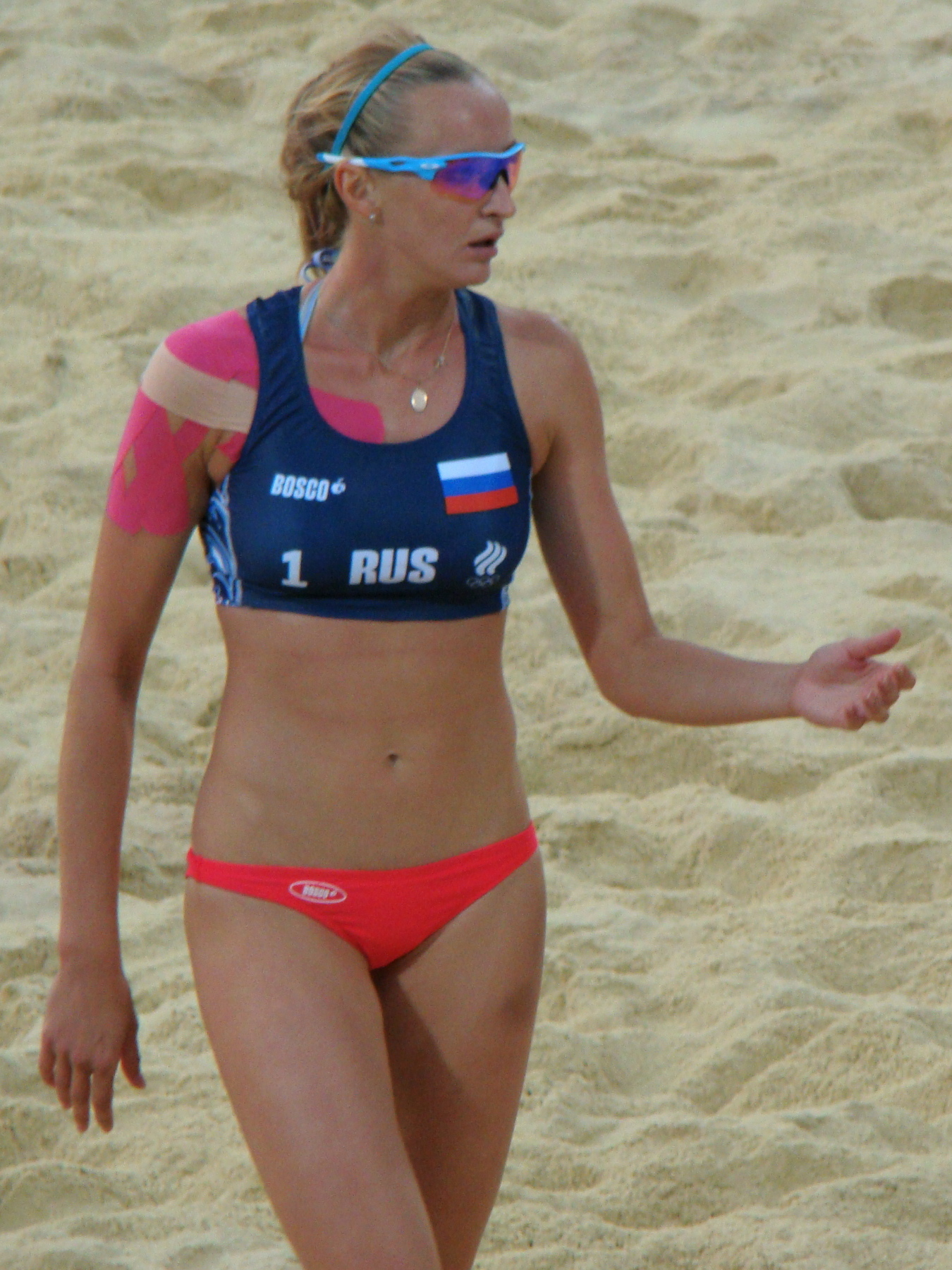
Birlova at the 2012 Summer Olympics

Ekaterina Vladimirovna Birlova (Russian: Екатерина Владимировна Бирлова, born 11 August 1987 in Bryansk), née Khomyakova (Russian: Хомякова), is a Russian beach volleyball player. As of 2012, she plays with Evgenia Ukolova. They qualified for the 2012 Summer Olympics in London and for the 2016 Summer Olympics in Rio de Janeiro.
