= Liliana Fernández =

Spanish beach volleyball player

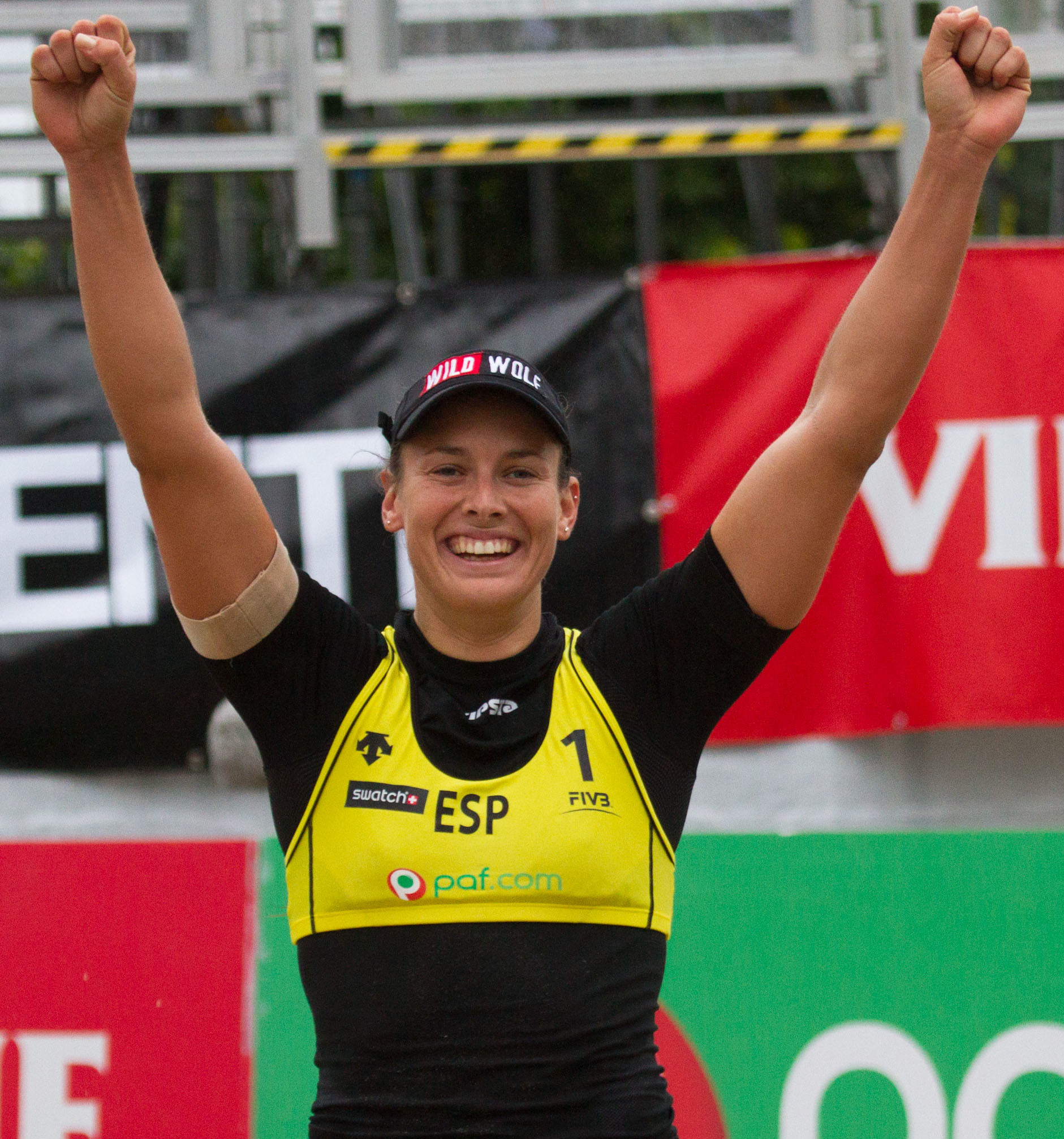
- Fernández in 2012

Personal information
- Full name: Liliana Fernández Steiner
- Nickname: Lili
- Nationality: Spanish
- Born: 4 January 1987 (age 39); Alicante, Spain
- Height: 1.78 m (5 ft 10 in)
- Weight: 75 kg (165 lb)
Honours
Women's beach volleyball
Representing Spain
European Championships
| Silver medal – second place | 2013 Klagenfurt | Beach |
| Bronze medal – third place | 2012 Scheveningen | Beach |
FIVB World Tour
| Silver medal – second place | 2016 Long Beach, CA | Beach |

Liliana Fernández Steiner (Note: In this Spanish name, the first or paternal surname is Fernández and the second or maternal family name is Steiner.) (born 4 January 1987) is a Spanish beach volleyball player. As of 2012, she plays with Elsa Baquerizo. The pair participated in the 2012 Summer Olympics tournament and were eliminated in the round of 16 by the Italians Greta Cicolari and Marta Menegatti.

== Professional career ==
=== World tour 2016 ===
The silver medal went to Elsa and Liliana at the Long Beach, California Grand Slam where they lost to April Ross/Kerri Walsh Jennings in straight sets of (21-16, 21-16)

== Personal life ==
Born in Spain, Fernández is of German descent through her maternal grandparents. Her mother was born in Croatia.
