= Beach volleyball at the 2022 South American Games =

- Venue: Los Pynandi World Cup Stadium
- Dates: 11 – 15 June
- Nations: 11
- Teams: 10 (men); 11 (women)

Beach volleyball competitions at the 2022 South American Games in Asunción, Paraguay were held between October 11 and 15, 2022 at Los Pynandi World Cup Stadium.

== Medal summary ==
=== Medal table ===
* Host nation (Paraguay)

Rank	Nation	Gold	Silver	Bronze	Total
1	Brazil (BRA)	1	0	1	2
1	Chile (CHI)	1	0	1	2
3	Argentina (ARG)	0	1	0	1
3	Paraguay (PAR)*	0	1	0	1
Totals (4 entries)		2	2	2	6

=== Medalists ===
Event	Gold	Silver	Bronze
Men's tournament	Chile; Esteban Grimalt; Marco Grimalt	Argentina; Nicolás Capogrosso; Tomás Capogrosso	Brazil; Arthur Mariano; Adrielson Silva
Women's tournament	Brazil; Bárbara Seixas; Carolina Solberg Salgado	Paraguay; Giuliana Poletti; Laura Ovelar	Chile; Chris Vorpahl; María Francisca Rivas

== Participating nations ==
=== Men's tournament ===
- Argentina
- Bolivia
- Brazil
- Chile
- Colombia
- Curaçao
- Ecuador
- Paraguay
- Peru
- Uruguay

=== Women's tournament ===
- Argentina
- Bolivia
- Brazil
- Chile
- Colombia
- Curaçao
- Ecuador
- Paraguay
- Peru
- Suriname
- Uruguay

== Results ==
=== Men's tournament ===
Group A

Pos	Team	Pld	W	L	Pts	SW	SL	SR	SPW	SPL	SPR	Qualification	PAR	URU	ECU	COL
1	Riveros – Battilana (Paraguay)	3	2	1	5	4	3	1.333	126	126	1.000	Quarterfinals	—	2–0	2–1	0–2
2	Mocellini – Llambias (Uruguay)	3	2	1	5	4	2	2.000	117	100	1.170	Quarterfinals	0–2	—	2–0	2–0
3	León – Quiñonez (Ecuador)	3	1	2	4	3	5	0.600	128	139	0.921		1–2	0–2	—	2–1
4	De Rivas – De la Hoz (Colombia)	3	1	2	4	3	4	0.750	121	127	0.953		2–0	0–2	1–2	—

Group B

Pos	Team	Pld	W	L	Pts	SW	SL	SR	SPW	SPL	SPR	Qualification	CHI	BRA	URU	BOL
1	Aravena – Droguett (Chile)	3	3	0	6	6	2	3.000	146	122	1.197	Quarterfinals	—	2–1	2–1	2–0
2	Lanci – Solberg (Brazil)	3	2	1	5	5	2	2.500	132	111	1.189	Quarterfinals	1–2	—	2–0	2–0
3	Hannibal – Cairus (Uruguay)	3	1	2	4	3	4	0.750	119	122	0.975		1–2	0–2	—	2–0
4	Zeballos – Salvatierra (Bolivia)	3	0	3	3	0	6	0.000	84	126	0.667		0–2	0–2	0–2	—

Group C

Pos	Team	Pld	W	L	Pts	SW	SL	SR	SPW	SPL	SPR	Qualification	CHI	ARG	CUR	PER
1	Grimalt – Grimalt (Chile)	3	3	0	6	6	1	6.000	136	82	1.659	Quarterfinals	—	2–1	2–0	2–0
2	Amieva – Aveiro (Argentina)	3	2	1	5	5	2	2.500	121	87	1.391	Quarterfinals	1–2	—	2–0	2–0
3	Luis – Anthony (Curaçao)	3	1	2	4	2	5	0.400	94	135	0.696		0–2	0–2	—	2–1
4	Sajami – Parreño (Peru)	3	0	3	3	1	6	0.167	92	139	0.662		0–2	0–2	1–2	—

Group D

Pos	Team	Pld	W	L	Pts	SW	SL	SR	SPW	SPL	SPR	Qualification	BRA	ARG	PAR	CUR
1	Silva – Mariano (Brazil)	3	3	0	6	6	5	1.200	139	102	1.363	Quarterfinals	—	2–1	2–0	2–0
2	Capogrosso – Capogrosso (Argentina)	3	2	1	5	5	3	1.667	132	105	1.257	Quarterfinals	1–2	—	2–0	2–0
3	Massare – Melgarejo (Paraguay)	3	1	2	4	2	2	1.000	104	109	0.954		0–2	0–2	—	2–0
4	Elsevijf – Van Henneigen (Curaçao)	3	0	3	3	0	6	0.000	67	126	0.532		0–2	0–2	0–2	—

Knockout Stage

Quarterfinals
(Chile) Aravena – Droguett	2
(Argentina) Amieva – Aveiro	0
(Brazil) Lanci – Solberg	0
(Chile) Grimalt – Grimalt	2
(Paraguay) Riveros – Battilana	0
(Argentina) Capogrosso – Capogrosso	2
(Brazil) Silva – Mariano	2
(Uruguay) Mocellini – Llambias	0

Semifinals
(Chile) Aravena – Droguett	0
(Chile) Grimalt – Grimalt	2
(Argentina) Capogrosso – Capogrosso	2
(Brazil) Silva – Mariano	0

Final
(Chile) Grimalt – Grimalt	2
(Argentina) Capogrosso – Capogrosso	0
Bronze medal match
(Chile) Aravena – Droguett	0
(Brazil) Silva – Mariano	2

=== Women's tournament ===
Group A

Pos	Team	Pld	W	L	Pts	SW	SL	SR	SPW	SPL	SPR	Qualification	PAR	ECU	COL	URU
1	Mongelos – Valiente (Paraguay)	3	3	0	6	6	1	6.000	140	100	1.400	Quarterfinals	—	2–1	2–0	2–0
2	Vilela – Simisterra (Ecuador)	3	2	1	5	5	2	2.500	129	129	1.000	Quarterfinals	1–2	—	2–0	2–0
3	Beltrán – Rios (Colombia)	3	1	2	4	2	4	0.500	107	107	1.000		0–2	0–2	—	2–0
4	Purtscher – Bianchi (Uruguay)	3	0	3	3	0	6	0.000	87	128	0.680		0–2	0–2	0–2	—

Group B

Pos	Team	Pld	W	L	Pts	SW	SL	SR	SPW	SPL	SPR	Qualification	CHI	URU	CHI	BRA
1	Vorpahl – Rivas (Chile)	3	3	0	6	6	0	MAX	130	64	2.031	Quarterfinals	—	2–0	2–0	2–0
2	Bausero – Fortunati (Uruguay)	3	2	1	5	4	2	2.000	120	78	1.538	Quarterfinals	0–2	—	2–0	2–0
3	Recart – Mardones (Chile)	3	1	2	4	2	4	0.500	103	85	1.212		0–2	0–2	—	2–0
4	Ana Patricia – Lisboa (Brazil)	3	0	3	3	0	6	0.000	0	126	0.000		0–2	0–2	0–2	—

Group C

Pos	Team	Pld	W	L	Pts	SW	SL	SR	SPW	SPL	SPR	Qualification	ARG	ARG	BOL	CUR
1	De Brito – Pereyra (Argentina)	3	3	0	6	6	0	MAX	126	81	1.556	Quarterfinals	—	2–0	2–0	2–0
2	Peralta – Najul (Argentina)	3	2	1	5	4	2	2.000	116	87	1.333	Quarterfinals	0–2	—	2–0	2–0
3	Chacón – Galindo (Bolivia)	3	1	2	4	2	4	0.500	91	115	0.791		0–2	0–2	—	2–0
4	Tolentino – St. Hilaire (Curaçao)	3	0	3	3	0	6	0.000	76	126	0.603		0–2	0–2	0–2	—

Group D

Pos	Team	Pld	W	L	Pts	SW	SL	SR	SPW	SPL	SPR	Qualification	BRA	PAR	PER	SUR
1	Seixas – Solberg Salgado (Brazil)	3	3	0	6	6	0	MAX	126	63	2.000	Quarterfinals	—	2–0	2–0	2–0
2	Poletti – Ovelar (Paraguay)	3	2	1	5	4	3	1.333	127	110	1.155	Quarterfinals	0–2	—	2–1	2–0
3	Gaona – Allcca (Peru)	3	1	2	4	3	4	0.750	115	124	0.927		0–2	1–2	—	2–0
4	Frankel – Tammenga (Suriname)	3	0	3	3	0	6	0.000	55	126	0.437		0–2	0–2	0–2	—

Knockout Stage

Quarterfinals
(Paraguay) Mongelos – Valiente	1
(Paraguay) Poletti – Ovelar	2
(Argentina) De Brito – Pereyra	2
(Uruguay) Bausero – Fortunati	0
(Chile) Vorpahl – Rivas	2
(Argentina) Peralta – Najul	1
(Brazil) Seixas – Solberg Salgado	2
(Ecuador) Vilela – Simisterra	2

Semifinals
(Paraguay) Poletti – Ovelar	2
(Argentina) De Brito – Pereyra	0
(Chile) Vorpahl – Rivas	0
(Brazil) Seixas – Solberg Salgado	2

Final
(Paraguay) Poletti – Ovelar	0
(Brazil) Seixas – Solberg Salgado	2
Bronze medal match
(Argentina) De Brito – Pereyra	1
(Chile) Vorpahl – Rivas	2
