= Marco Grimalt =

Chilean beach volleyball player (born 1989)

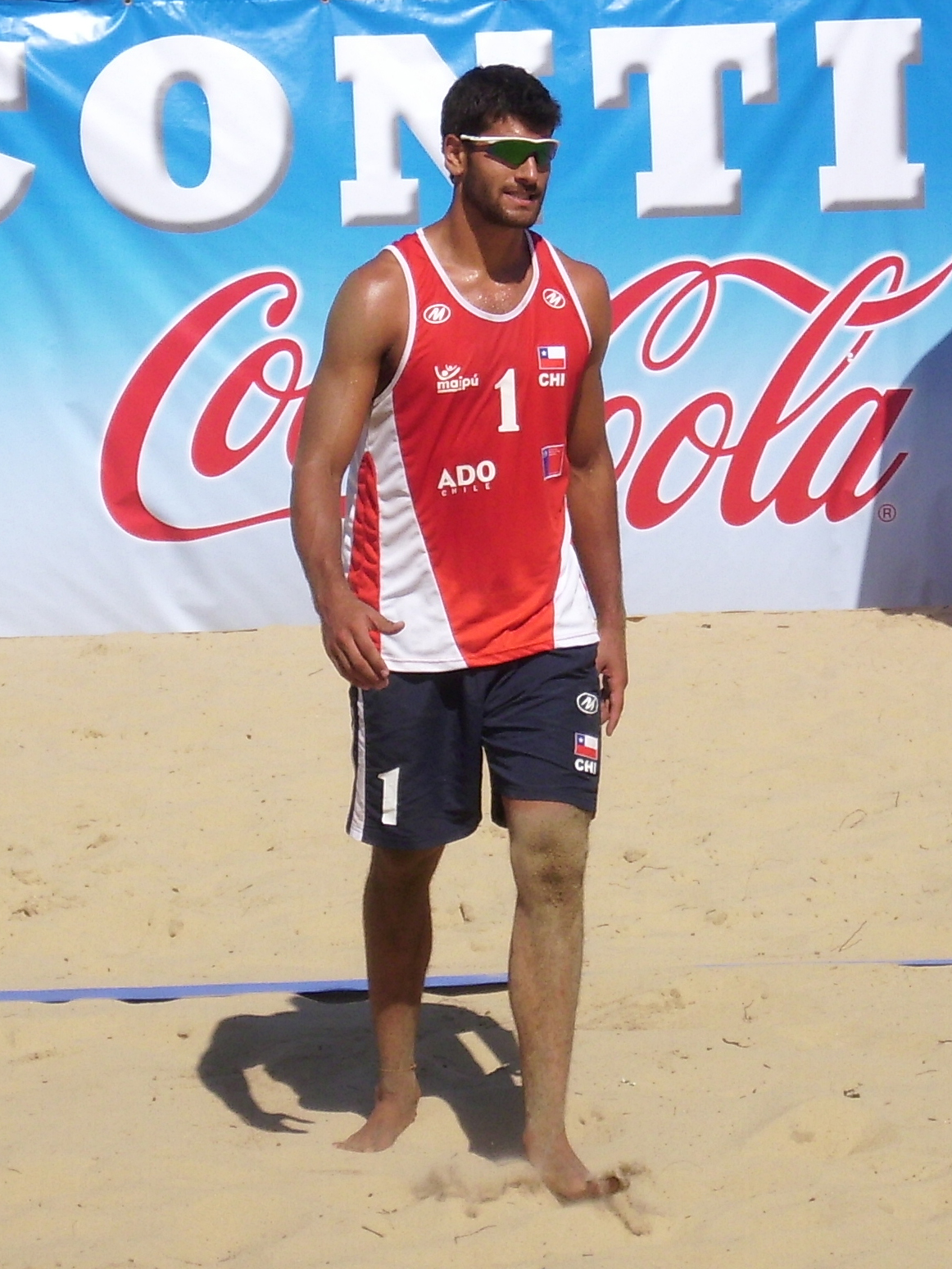
- Grimalt in 2011

Personal information
- Nationality: Chile
- Born: 11 July 1989 (age 37); Queilén, Chile
- Height: 1.96 m (6 ft 5 in)
- Weight: 92 kg (203 lb)
Honours
Men's beach volleyball
Representing Chile
Pan American Games
Gold medal – first place	2019 Lima	Beach
Bronze medal – third place	2023 Santiago	Beach
South American Games
Gold medal – first place	2022 Asunción	Beach
Silver medal – second place	2014 Santiago	Beach
Bronze medal – third place	2010 Medellín	Beach
Bronze medal – third place	2018 Cochabamba	Beach
Bronze medal – third place	2026 Santa Fe	Beach
Bolivarian Games
Gold medal – first place	2013 Trujillo	Beach
Silver medal – second place	2017 Santa Marta	Beach

Marco Alfonso Grimalt Krogh (Note: In this Chilean name, the first or paternal surname is Grimalt and the second or maternal family name is Krogh.) (born 11 July 1989) is a beach volleyball player representing the Chilean national volleyball team. He has participated in the Pan American Games in 2011, 2015, 2019, and 2023, as well as the South American Games in 2010 and 2014. He represented Chile at the 2020 Summer Olympics.

Teaming up with his cousin Esteban Grimalt, he clinched the gold medal at the 2019 Pan American Games and was honored with the National Sports Award in 2022.

== Career ==
Grimalt was born in Queilén, Chiloé, but grew up in Linares, Maule Region. His passion for volleyball developed early, influenced by his father and several relatives who played the sport. Alongside his cousin Esteban Grimalt, they began dedicating themselves to beach volleyball in 2006, primarily during the Chilean summers due to the country's climate.

After their participation in the 2010 South American Games in Colombia, where they secured a bronze medal, the Chilean Association of Olympic Athletes approved a project that allowed them to focus on beach volleyball year-round.

In the 2011 Pan American Games held in Guadalajara, Mexico, the Grimalt duo fell short of reaching the quarterfinals, with one win and two losses. The following year, they clinched the gold medal in the inaugural Bolivarian Beach Games in Lima, Peru. In 2012, they also claimed gold in the South American Beach Volleyball Circuit held in Santa Fe, Argentina.

In 2014, Marco Grimalt and Esteban Grimalt participated in the 2014 South American Games in Santiago, Chile, earning a silver medal after losing in the final to the Brazilian team of Alison Conte and Bruno Oscar de Almeida.

At the 2015 Pan American Games in Toronto, they finished in fourth place. At the 2019 Pan American Games in Lima, they won the gold medal by defeating the Mexican duo of Rodolfo Ontiveros and Juan Virgen in the final.

At the 2020 Summer Olympics in Tokyo, the Grimalt duo was defeated in the round of 16 by Konstantin Semenov and Ilya Leshukov, who represented the Russian Olympic Committee.

At the 2022 South American Games in Asunción, the Grimalts won the gold medal by defeating the Argentine duo of Nicolás and Tomás Capogrosso.

== Notes ==
Olympic Games
Preceded by Henrik von Appen	Flag bearer for Chile; Tokyo 2020 with Francisca Crovetto	Succeeded by Dominique Ohaco; Henrik Von Appen
