= Beach volleyball at the 2022 Bolivarian Games =

Beach volleyball competitions at the 2022 Bolivarian Games

- Volleyball (beach) pictogram
- Venue: Parque de la Leyenda Vallenata
- Dates: 2–5 July 2022
- Competitors: 48 from 8 nations
- Teams: 24 (6 men and 5 women)

Beach volleyball competitions at the 2022 Bolivarian Games in Valledupar, Colombia were held from 2 to 5 July 2022 at Parque de la Leyenda Vallenata beach volleyball courts.

Two medal events were scheduled to be contested: men's and women's tournaments. A total of 48 athletes (26 athletes – 13 teams for men and 22 athletes – 11 teams for women) competed in the events. Both tournaments were open competitions without age restrictions.

Pairs José Gregorio Gómez-Rolando Hernandez from Venezuela and Michelle Valiente-Patricia Caballero from Paraguay were the defending men's and women's gold medalists, respectively.

== Participating nations ==
A total of eight nations (six ODEBO nations and two invited) registered teams for the beach volleyball events. Each nation could enter a maximum of eight athletes (two teams of two athletes each per gender). Hosts Colombia, Ecuador and Venezuela entered four teams each; Chile and Peru entered three teams each; and Dominican Republic, Panama and Paraguay two teams each. The participation of Bolivia and Guatemala was expected, but eventually they did not register teams.

- Chile (6 athletes)
- Colombia (8)
- Dominican Republic (4)
- Ecuador (8)
- Panama (4)
- Paraguay (4)
- Peru (6)
- Venezuela (8)

=== Teams ===
NOC	Men's teams	Women's teams
~~Bolivia~~	~~Carlos Chacón – Renzo Zaconeta~~	~~Isabel Chacón – Maria Jose Galindo~~
Chile	Noé Aravena – Vicente Droguett/ Thomas Acevedo – Martín Iglesias	Chris Vorpahl – Francisca Rivas
Colombia	Sneider De Rivas – Johan Murray / Juan Carlos Noriega – Camilo Rivera	Margarita Guzmán – Marcela Ríos / Yuly Ayala – Ana María Beltrán
Ecuador	Dany León – Joffré Jurado / Marcos Tenorio – Pedro Jaramillo	Karelys Simisterra – Ariana Vilela / Valeria Batioja – Jasmín Suárez
Panama	José Miguel González – Jason Quintero	Hashlyn Cuero – Karla Doris Ortiz
Paraguay	Roger Battilana – Gonzalo Melgarejo / Jorge Riveros – Luis Riveros	
Peru	Mauricio Sajami – Gabriel Vásquez	Lisbeth Allcca – Claudia Gaona / Alexandra Carrasco – Cinthia Herrera
Dominican Republic	Hayerling De Jesús – Oscar Martínez	Julibeth Payano – Jeneiry Rosario
Venezuela	José Torrealba – Hernán Tovar / Jose Gómez – Rolando Hernández	Zulay Ramírez – Juliennis Regalado / Yhonnielis Camacho – Urimar Narvaez

== Medal summary ==
=== Medal table ===
* Host nation (Host nation)

Rank	Nation	Gold	Silver	Bronze	Total
1	Chile (CHI)	2	0	0	2
2	Colombia (COL)*	0	1	2	3
3	Ecuador (ECU)	0	1	0	1
Totals (3 entries)		2	2	2	6

=== Medalists ===
Event	Gold	Silver	Bronze
Men's tournament	Chile; Noé Aravena; Vicente Droguett	Ecuador; Pedro Jaramillo; Dany León	Colombia; Johan Murray; Sneider De Rivas
Women's tournament	Chile; Chris Vorpahl; Francisca Rivas	Colombia; Yuly Ayala; Ana María Beltrán	Colombia; Margarita Guzmán; Marcela Ríos

== Venue ==
All matches in both events were played at the beach volleyball courts of the Parque de la Leyenda Vallenata in Valledupar.

== Groups composition ==
The pools for both events were conformed as follows:

Men's groups

Pool A
Pos	Team
A1	(Colombia) De Rivas – Murray (COL 1)
A2	(Venezuela) Torrealba – Tovar (VEN 1)
A3	(Chile) Acevedo – Iglesias (CHI 2)

Pool B
Pos	Team
B1	(Dominican Republic) De Jesús – Martínez (DOM)
B2	(Peru) Sajami – Vásquez (PER)
B3	(Paraguay) J. Riveros – L. Riveros (PAR 2)

Pool C
Pos	Team
C1	(Chile) Aravena – Droguett (CHI 1)
C2	(Ecuador) Jurado – León (ECU 1)
C3	(Colombia) Noriega – Rivera (COL 2)

Pool D
Pos	Team
D1	(Panama) González – Quintero (PAN)
D2	(Paraguay) Battilana – Melgarejo (PAR 1)
D3	(Ecuador) Jaramillo – Tenorio (ECU 2)
D4	(Venezuela) Gómez – Hernández (VEN 2)

Women's groups

Pool A
Pos	Team
A1	(Colombia) Guzmán – Ríos (COL 1)
A2	(Peru) Allcca – Gaona (PER 1)
A3	(Venezuela) Ramírez – Regalado (VEN 1)

Pool B
Pos	Team
B1	(Dominican Republic) Payano – Rosario (DOM)
B2	(Ecuador) Simisterra – Vilela (ECU 1)
B3	(Ecuador) Batioja – Suárez (ECU 2)
B4	(Venezuela) Camacho – Narvaez (VEN 2)

Pool C
Pos	Team
C1	(Chile) Rivas – Vorpahl (CHI 1)
C2	(Panama) Cuero – Ortiz (PAN)
C3	(Colombia) Ayala – Beltrán (COL 2)
C4	(Peru) Carrasco – Herrera (PER 2)

== Men's tournament ==
2022 Bolivarian Games Men's Beach volleyball tournament
Tournament details
- Host country: Colombia
- City: Valledupar
- Dates: 2–5 July 2022
- Teams: 13 (from 2 confederations)
- Venue: 1 (in 1 host city)

The men's tournament was held from 2–5 July 2022, and consisted of a group stage and a final stage.

All match times are in COT (UTC−5).

=== Group stage ===
The group stage consists of three groups of three and one group of four. Each group is played under round-robin format, with the top two teams progressing to the quarter-finals.

==== Pool A ====
Pos	Team	Pld	W	L	Pts	SW	SL	SR	SPW	SPL	SPR	Qualification
1	De Rivas – Murray (COL) (H)	0	0	0	0	0	0	—	0	0	—	Quarter-finals
2	Torrealba – Tovar (VEN)	0	0	0	0	0	0	—	0	0	—	Quarter-finals
3	Acevedo – Iglesias (CHI)	0	0	0	0	0	0	—	0	0	—	

First match(es) will be played: 5 July 2022. Source:
(H) Host

2 July 2022; 11:00	De Rivas – Murray (Colombia)	Match 4	(Chile) Acevedo – Iglesias	Parque de la Leyenda Vallenata – Court 1

3 July 2022; 19:00	Torrealba – Tovar (Venezuela)	Match 9	(Chile) Acevedo – Iglesias	Parque de la Leyenda Vallenata – Court 2

3 July 2022; 16:00	De Rivas – Murray (Colombia)	Match 15	(Venezuela) Torrealba – Tovar	Parque de la Leyenda Vallenata – Court 1

==== Pool B ====
Pos	Team	Pld	W	L	Pts	SW	SL	SR	SPW	SPL	SPR	Qualification
1	De Jesús – Martínez (DOM)	0	0	0	0	0	0	—	0	0	—	Quarter-finals
2	Sajami – Vásquez (PER)	0	0	0	0	0	0	—	0	0	—	Quarter-finals
3	J. Riveros – L. Riveros (PAR)	0	0	0	0	0	0	—	0	0	—	

First match(es) will be played: 2 July 2022. Source:

2 July 2022; 12:00	De Jesús – Martínez (Dominican Republic)	Match 5	(Paraguay) J. Riveros – L. Riveros	Parque de la Leyenda Vallenata – Court 1

3 July 2022; 9:00	Sajami – Vásquez (Peru)	Match 7	(Paraguay) J. Riveros – L. Riveros	Parque de la Leyenda Vallenata – Court 2

3 July 2022; 15:00	De Jesús – Martínez (Dominican Republic)	Match 13	(Peru) Sajami – Vásquez	Parque de la Leyenda Vallenata – Court 1

==== Pool C ====
Pos	Team	Pld	W	L	Pts	SW	SL	SR	SPW	SPL	SPR	Qualification
1	Aravena – Droguett (CHI)	0	0	0	0	0	0	—	0	0	—	Quarter-finals
2	Jurado – León (ECU)	0	0	0	0	0	0	—	0	0	—	Quarter-finals
3	Noriega – Rivera (COL) (H)	0	0	0	0	0	0	—	0	0	—	

First match(es) will be played: 2 July 2022. Source:
(H) Host

2 July 2022; 9:00	Aravena – Droguett (Chile)	Match 2	(Colombia) Noriega – Rivera	Parque de la Leyenda Vallenata – Court 1

3 July 2022; 12:00	Jurado – León (Ecuador)	Match 10	(Colombia) Noriega – Rivera	Parque de la Leyenda Vallenata – Court 2

3 July 2022; 15:00	Aravena – Droguett (Chile)	Match 14	(Ecuador) Jurado – León	Parque de la Leyenda Vallenata – Court 2

==== Pool D ====
Pos	Team	Pld	W	L	Pts	SW	SL	SR	SPW	SPL	SPR	Qualification
1	González – Quintero (PAN)	0	0	0	0	0	0	—	0	0	—	Quarter-finals
2	Battilana – Melgarejo (PAR)	0	0	0	0	0	0	—	0	0	—	Quarter-finals
3	Jaramillo – Tenorio (ECU)	0	0	0	0	0	0	—	0	0	—	
4	Gómez – Hernández (VEN)	0	0	0	0	0	0	—	0	0	—	

First match(es) will be played: 2 July 2022. Source:

2 July 2022; 9:00	Battilana – Melgarejo (Paraguay)	1-2	(Ecuador) Jaramillo – Tenorio	Parque de la Leyenda Vallenata – Court 1

2 July 2022; 10:00	González – Quintero (Panama)	Match 3	(Venezuela) Gómez – Hernández	Parque de la Leyenda Vallenata – Court 1

3 July 2022; 8:00	González – Quintero (Panama)	Match 6	(Ecuador) Jaramillo – Tenorio	Parque de la Leyenda Vallenata – Court 2

3 July 2022; 10:00	Battilana – Melgarejo (Paraguay)	Match 8	(Venezuela) Gómez – Hernández	Parque de la Leyenda Vallenata – Court 2

3 July 2022; 14:00	Jaramillo – Tenorio (Ecuador)	Match 11	(Venezuela) Gómez – Hernández	Parque de la Leyenda Vallenata – Court 1

3 July 2022; 14:00	González – Quintero (Panama)	Match 12	(Paraguay) Battilana – Melgarejo	Parque de la Leyenda Vallenata – Court 2

=== Final stage ===
The final stage consists of the quarter-finals, semi-finals and the bronze and gold medal matches. The quarter-finals match-ups were:

- Quarter-final 1: Winners Pool B v runners-up Group C
- Quarter-final 2: Winners Pool D v runners-up Group A
- Quarter-final 3: Winners Pool A v runners-up Group D
- Quarter-final 4: Winners Pool C v runners-up Group B

The semi-finals match-ups were:

- Semifinal 1: Winners Quarter-final 1 v winners Quarter-final 2
- Semifinal 2: Winners Quarter-final 3 v winners Quarter-final 4

Winners of semi-finals played the gold medal match, while losers played the bronze medal match.

Quarter-finals
Winners Pool B
Winners Pool C
Winners Pool D
Winners Pool A
Winners Pool A
Winners Pool D
Winners Pool C
Winners Pool B

Semi-finals

Gold medal match
Bronze medal match

==== Quarter-finals ====
4 July 2022; 11:00	Winners Pool B	Match 16	Runners-up Group C	Parque de la Leyenda Vallenata – Court 1

4 July 2022; 11:00	Winners Pool D	Match 17	Runners-up Group A	Parque de la Leyenda Vallenata – Court 2

4 July 2022; 12:00	Winners Pool A	Match 18	Runners-up Group D	Parque de la Leyenda Vallenata – Court 1

4 July 2022; 12:00	Winners Pool C	Match 19	Runners-up Group B	Parque de la Leyenda Vallenata – Court 2

==== Semi-finals ====
4 July 2022; 15:00	Winner Match 16	Match 20	Winner Match 17	Parque de la Leyenda Vallenata – Court 1

4 July 2022; 15:00	Winner Match 18	Match 21	Winner Match 19	Parque de la Leyenda Vallenata – Court 2

==== Bronze medal match ====
5 July 2022; 9:00	Loser Match 20	Match 22	Loser Match 21	Parque de la Leyenda Vallenata – Court 1

==== Gold medal match ====
5 July 2022; 10:00	Winner Match 20	Match 23	Winner Match 21	Parque de la Leyenda Vallenata – Court 1

== Women's tournament ==
Beach volleyball at the 2022 Bolivarian Games
Tournament details
- Host country: Colombia
- City: Valledupar
- Dates: 2–5 July 2022
- Teams: 11 (from 2 confederations)
- Venue: 1 (in 1 host city)

The women's tournament was held from 2–5 July 2022, and consisted of a group stage and a final stage.

All match times are in COT (UTC−5).

=== Group stage ===
The group stage consists of one group of three and two groups of four. Each group is played under the round-robin format, with the top two teams plus the two best third-placed teams advancing to the quarter-finals.

==== Pool A ====
Pos	Team	Pld	W	L	Pts	SW	SL	SR	SPW	SPL	SPR	Qualification
1	Guzmán – Ríos (COL) (H)	0	0	0	0	0	0	—	0	0	—	Quarter-finals
2	Allcca – Gaona (PER)	0	0	0	0	0	0	—	0	0	—	Quarter-finals
3	Ramírez – Regalado (VEN)	0	0	0	0	0	0	—	0	0	—	

First match(es) will be played: 5 July 2022. Source:
(H) Host

2 July 2022; 12:00	Guzmán – Ríos (Colombia)	Match 5	(Venezuela) Ramírez – Regalado	Parque de la Leyenda Vallenata – Court 2

2 July 2022; 15:00	Allcca – Gaona (Peru)	Match 8	(Venezuela) Ramírez – Regalado	Parque de la Leyenda Vallenata – Court 1

3 July 2022; 12:00	Guzmán – Ríos (Colombia)	Match 15	(Peru) Allcca – Gaona	Parque de la Leyenda Vallenata – Court 1

==== Pool B ====
Pos	Team	Pld	W	L	Pts	SW	SL	SR	SPW	SPL	SPR	Qualification
1	Payano – Rosario (DOM)	0	0	0	0	0	0	—	0	0	—	Quarter-finals
2	Simisterra – Vilela (ECU)	0	0	0	0	0	0	—	0	0	—	Quarter-finals
3	Batioja – Suárez (ECU)	0	0	0	0	0	0	—	0	0	—	
4	Camacho – Narvaez (VEN)	0	0	0	0	0	0	—	0	0	—	

First match(es) will be played: 2 July 2022. Source:

2 July 2022; 8:00	Payano – Rosario (Dominican Republic)	Match 1	(Venezuela) Camacho – Narvaez	Parque de la Leyenda Vallenata – Court 2

2 July 2022; 9:00	Simisterra – Vilela (Ecuador)	Match 2	(Ecuador) Batioja – Suárez	Parque de la Leyenda Vallenata – Court 2

2 July 2022; 14:00	Payano – Rosario (Dominican Republic)	Match 6	(Ecuador) Batioja – Suárez	Parque de la Leyenda Vallenata – Court 1

2 July 2022; 14:00	Simisterra – Vilela (Ecuador)	Match 7	(Venezuela) Camacho – Narvaez	Parque de la Leyenda Vallenata – Court 2

3 July 2022; 10:00	Batioja – Suárez (Ecuador)	Match 13	(Venezuela) Camacho – Narvaez	Parque de la Leyenda Vallenata – Court 1

3 July 2022; 11:00	Payano – Rosario (Dominican Republic)	Match 14	(Ecuador) Simisterra – Vilela	Parque de la Leyenda Vallenata – Court 1

==== Pool C ====
Pos	Team	Pld	W	L	Pts	SW	SL	SR	SPW	SPL	SPR	Qualification
1	Vorpahl – Rivas (CHI)	0	0	0	0	0	0	—	0	0	—	Quarter-finals
2	Cuero – Ortiz (PAN)	0	0	0	0	0	0	—	0	0	—	Quarter-finals
3	Ayala – Beltrán (COL)	0	0	0	0	0	0	—	0	0	—	
4	Carrasco – Herrera (PER)	0	0	0	0	0	0	—	0	0	—	

First match(es) will be played: 2 July 2022. Source:

2 July 2022; 10:00	Cuero – Ortiz (Panama)	Match 3	(Colombia) Ayala – Beltrán	Parque de la Leyenda Vallenata – Court 2

2 July 2022; 11:00	Rivas – Vorpahl (Chile)	Match 4	(Peru) Carrasco – Herrera	Parque de la Leyenda Vallenata – Court 2

2 July 2022; 15:00	Cuero – Ortiz (Panama)	Match 9	(Peru) Carrasco – Herrera	Parque de la Leyenda Vallenata – Court 2

2 July 2022; 16:00	Rivas – Vorpahl (Chile)	Match 10	(Colombia) Ayala – Beltrán	Parque de la Leyenda Vallenata – Court 1

3 July 2022; 8:00	Rivas – Vorpahl (Chile)	Match 11	(Panama) Cuero – Ortiz	Parque de la Leyenda Vallenata – Court 1

3 July 2022; 9:00	Ayala – Beltrán (Colombia)	Match 12	(Peru) Carrasco – Herrera	Parque de la Leyenda Vallenata – Court 1

=== Final stage ===
The final stage consists of the quarter-finals, semi-finals and the bronze and gold medal matches. The quarter-finals match-ups were:

- Quarter-final 1 (match 16): Best first-placed team v 2nd best third-placed team
- Quarter-final 2 (match 17): Best second-placed team v 2nd best second-placed team
- Quarter-final 3 (match 18): 3rd best first-placed team v 3rd best second-placed team
- Quarter-final 4 (match 19): 2nd best first-placed team v Best third-placed team

The semi-finals match-ups were:

- Semifinal 1 (match 20): Winners Quarter-final 1 v winners Quarter-final 2
- Semifinal 2 (match 21): Winners Quarter-final 3 v winners Quarter-final 4

Winners of semi-finals played the gold medal match, while losers played the bronze medal match.

Quarter-finals
Best first-placed team
2nd best third-placed team
Best second-placed team
2nd best second-placed team
3rd best first-placed team
3rd best second-placed team
2nd best first-placed team
Best third-placed team

Semi-finals

Gold medal match
Bronze medal match

==== Quarter-finals ====
4 July 2022; 9:00	Best first-placed team	Match 16	2nd best third-placed team	Parque de la Leyenda Vallenata – Court 1

4 July 2022; 9:00	Best second-placed team	Match 17	2nd best second-placed team	Parque de la Leyenda Vallenata – Court 2

4 July 2022; 10:00	3rd best first-placed team	Match 18	3rd best second-placed team	Parque de la Leyenda Vallenata – Court 1

4 July 2022; 10:00	2nd best first-placed team	Match 19	Best third-placed team	Parque de la Leyenda Vallenata – Court 2

==== Semi-finals ====
4 July 2022; 14:00	Winner Match 16	Match 20	Winner Match 17	Parque de la Leyenda Vallenata – Court 1

4 July 2022; 14:00	Winner Match 18	Match 21	Winner Match 19	Parque de la Leyenda Vallenata – Court 2

==== Bronze medal match ====
5 July 2022; 9:00	Loser match 20	Match 22	Loser match 21	Parque de la Leyenda Vallenata – Court 2

==== Gold medal match ====
5 July 2022; 10:00	Winner match 20	Match 23	Winner match 21	Parque de la Leyenda Vallenata – Court 2
