= Beach volleyball at the 2026 South American Games =

Beach volleyball competitions at the 2026 South American Games

- Venue: Rural Picadero
- Dates: September 13–17
- Competitors: 48 from 10 nations

Beach volleyball competitions at the 2026 South American Games in Rosario, Santa Fe, and Rafaela, Argentina, were held between September 13 and 17 at Rural Picadero, located within Parque de la Independencia in Rosario.

A total of two tournaments were contested (one men's and one women's).

== Medal summary ==
=== Medal table ===
Rank	Nation	Gold	Silver	Bronze	Total
1	Brazil	2	0	0	2
2	Paraguay	0	1	0	1
2	Venezuela	0	1	0	1
4	Chile	0	0	1	1
4	Peru	0	0	1	1
Totals (5 entries)		2	2	2	6

=== Medalists ===
Event	Gold	Silver	Bronze
Men's tournament	Brazil; Arthur Lanci; Evandro Junior	Venezuela; Esyenser Delgado; Juliangel Vargas	Chile; Esteban Grimalt; Marco Grimalt
Women's tournament	Brazil; Carolina Solberg; Rebecca Silva	Paraguay; Michelle Valiente; Giuliana Poletti Corrales	Peru; Lisbeth Allcca; Claudia Gaona

== Participation ==
Ten nations participated in the beach volleyball tournaments of the 2026 South American Games.

- Argentina (8)
- Bolivia (6)
- Brazil (4)
- Chile (4)
- Colombia (4)
- Ecuador (4)
- Paraguay (8)
- Peru (2)
- Uruguay (4)
- Venezuela (4)

== Results ==
=== Men's tournament ===
==== Groups ====
Group A

Pos	Team	Pld	W	L	Pts	SW	SL	SR	SPW	SPL	SPR	Qualification	ARG	ECU	BOL
1	Capogrosso – Capogrosso (Argentina)	2	2	0	4	4	0	MAX	84	45	1.867	Quarterfinals	—	2–0	2–0
2	Vélez – Quiñonez (Ecuador)	2	1	1	3	2	2	1.000	62	70	0.886	Quarterfinals	0–2	—	2–0
3	Pérez – Pérez (Bolivia)	2	0	2	2	0	4	0.000	53	84	0.631		0–2	0–2	—

Source: Results

Group B

Pos	Team	Pld	W	L	Pts	SW	SL	SR	SPW	SPL	SPR	Qualification	VEN	BRA	ARG
1	Delgado – Vargas (Venezuela)	2	2	0	4	4	2	2.000	104	103	1.010	Quarterfinals	—	2–1	2–1
2	Arthur – Evandro (Brazil)	2	1	1	3	3	3	1.000	105	102	1.029	Quarterfinals	1–2	—	2–1
3	Bueno – Amieva (Argentina)	2	0	2	2	2	4	0.500	99	103	0.961		1–2	1–2	—

Source: Results

Group C

Pos	Team	Pld	W	L	Pts	SW	SL	SR	SPW	SPL	SPR	Qualification	PAR	COL	PAR
1	Giuliano – Gonzalo (Paraguay)	2	2	0	4	4	0	MAX	84	61	1.377	Quarterfinals	—	2–0	2–0
2	Yeferson – Noriega (Colombia)	2	1	1	3	2	2	1.000	78	67	1.164	Quarterfinals	0–2	—	2–0
3	Maxi – Yegros (Paraguay)	2	0	2	2	0	4	0.000	50	84	0.595		0–2	0–2	—

Source: Results

Group D

Pos	Team	Pld	W	L	Pts	SW	SL	SR	SPW	SPL	SPR	Qualification	URU	URU	CHI
1	Grimalt – Grimalt (Chile)	2	2	0	4	4	0	MAX	84	59	1.424	Quarterfinals	—	2–0	2–0
2	Rubio – Luciano (Uruguay)	2	1	1	3	2	3	0.667	74	91	0.813	Quarterfinals	0–2	—	2–1
3	Llambias – Mocellini (Uruguay)	2	0	2	2	1	4	0.250	75	83	0.904		0–2	1–2	—

Source: Results

==== Playoffs ====
Classification 9-12 places

Semifinals 9-12
(Bolivia) Pérez – Pérez	0
(Uruguay) Llambias – Mocellini	2
(Argentina) Bueno – Amieva	2
(Paraguay) Maxi – Yegros	0

9 place match
(Uruguay) Llambias – Mocellini	0
(Argentina) Bueno – Amieva	2
11 place match
(Bolivia) Pérez – Pérez	2
(Paraguay) Maxi – Yegros	0

Classification 5-8 places

Semifinals 5-8
(Paraguay) Giuliano – Gonzalo	2
(Uruguay) Rubio – Luciano	0
(Colombia) Yeferson – Noriega	2
(Ecuador) Vélez – Quiñonez	0

5 place match
(Paraguay) Giuliano – Gonzalo	1
(Colombia) Yeferson – Noriega	2
7 place match
(Uruguay) Rubio – Luciano	2
(Ecuador) Vélez – Quiñonez	0

Knockout Stage

Quarterfinals
(Venezuela) Delgado – Vargas	2
(Colombia) Yeferson – Noriega	0
(Chile) Grimalt – Grimalt	2
(Ecuador) Vélez – Quiñonez	0
(Paraguay) Giuliano – Gonzalo	0
(Brazil) Arthur – Evandro	2
(Argentina) Capogrosso – Capogrosso	2
(Uruguay) Rubio – Luciano	0

Semifinals
(Venezuela) Delgado – Vargas	2
(Chile) Grimalt – Grimalt	1
(Brazil) Arthur – Evandro	2
(Argentina) Capogrosso – Capogrosso	1

Final
(Venezuela) Delgado – Vargas	0
(Brazil) Arthur – Evandro	2
Bronze medal match
(Chile) Grimalt – Grimalt	2
(Argentina) Capogrosso – Capogrosso	0

==== Final classification ====
Rank	Team	Country	Win/loss
1st place, gold medalist(s)	Arthur Lanci – Evandro Oliveira	Brazil	4–1
2nd place, silver medalist(s)	Esyenser Delgado – Juliangel Vargas	Venezuela	4–1
3rd place, bronze medalist(s)	Esteban Grimalt – Marco Grimalt	Chile	4–1
4	Tomás Capogrosso – Nicolás Capogrosso	Argentina	3–2
5	Yeferson de la Hoz – Juan Noriega	Colombia	3–2
6	Giuliano Massare – Gonzalo Melgarejo	Paraguay	3–2
7	Sebastián Rubio – Luciano Fernández	Uruguay	2–3
8	Alfredo Vélez – Ronald Quiñonez	Ecuador	1–4
9	Maciel Bueno – Bautista Amieva	Argentina	2–2
10	Nicolás LLambias – Lucas Mocellini	Uruguay	1–3
11	Edson Pérez – Rodrigo Pérez	Bolivia	1–3
12	Maximiliano Pérez – Matías Yegros	Paraguay	0–4

=== Women's tournament ===
==== Groups ====
Group A

Pos	Team	Pld	W	L	Pts	SW	SL	SR	SPW	SPL	SPR	Qualification	VEN	ARG	COL
1	Rodríguez – Moreno (Venezuela)	2	2	0	4	4	1	4.000	97	87	1.115	Quarterfinals	—	2–1	2–0
2	Churin – Enríquez (Argentina)	2	1	1	3	3	3	1.000	102	97	1.052	Quarterfinals	1–2	—	2–1
3	Beleño – Sara (Colombia)	2	0	2	2	1	4	0.250	82	97	0.845		0–2	1–2	—

Source: Results

Group B

Pos	Team	Pld	W	L	Pts	SW	SL	SR	SPW	SPL	SPR	Qualification	BRA	PAR	BOL
1	Carol – Rebecca (Brazil)	2	2	0	4	4	0	MAX	84	49	1.714	Quarterfinals	—	2–0	2–0
2	Fio – Denisse (Paraguay)	2	1	1	3	2	2	1.000	65	68	0.956	Quarterfinals	0–2	—	2–0
3	Velásquez – Galindo (Bolivia)	2	0	2	2	0	4	0.000	52	84	0.619		0–2	0–2	—

Source: Results

Group C

Pos	Team	Pld	W	L	Pts	SW	SL	SR	SPW	SPL	SPR	Qualification	PAR	ARG	CHI
1	Michelle – Corrales (Paraguay)	2	2	0	4	4	0	MAX	84	51	1.647	Quarterfinals	—	2–0	2–0
2	Ghigliazza – Abdala (Argentina)	2	1	1	3	2	2	1.000	67	72	0.931	Quarterfinals	0–2	—	2–0
3	Dubost – Ohlsson (Chile)	2	0	2	2	0	4	0.000	56	84	0.667		0–2	0–2	—

Source: Results

Group D

Pos	Team	Pld	W	L	Pts	SW	SL	SR	SPW	SPL	SPR	Qualification	PER	ECU	BOL
1	Allcca – Gaona (Peru)	2	2	0	4	4	0	MAX	84	61	1.377	Quarterfinals	—	2–0	2–0
2	Ariana – Valeska (Ecuador)	2	1	1	3	2	2	1.000	76	62	1.226	Quarterfinals	0–2	—	2–0
3	Arnez – Valda (Bolivia)	2	0	2	2	0	4	0.000	47	84	0.560		0–2	0–2	—

Source: Results

==== Playoffs ====
Classification 9-12 places

Semifinals 9-12
(Colombia) Beleño – Sara	2
(Bolivia) Arnez – Valda	0
(Bolivia) Velásquez – Galindo	2
(Chile) Dubost – Ohlsson	1

9 place match
(Colombia) Beleño – Sara	1
(Bolivia) Velásquez – Galindo	2
11 place match
(Bolivia) Arnez – Valda	0
(Chile) Dubost – Ohlsson	2

Classification 5-8 places

Semifinals 5-8
(Ecuador) Ariana – Valeska	0
(Paraguay) Fio – Denisse	2
(Argentina) Churin – Enríquez	2
(Argentina) Ghigliazza – Abdala	1

5 place match
(Paraguay) Fio – Denisse	1
(Argentina) Churin – Enríquez	2
7 place match
(Ecuador) Ariana – Valeska	2
(Argentina) Ghigliazza – Abdala	1

Knockout Stage

Quarterfinals
(Venezuela) Rodríguez – Moreno	2
(Ecuador) Ariana – Valeska	1
(Paraguay) Michelle – Corrales	2
(Paraguay) Fio – Denisse	0
(Peru) Allcca – Gaona	2
(Argentina) Churin – Enríquez	1
(Brazil) Carol – Rebecca	2
(Argentina) Ghigliazza – Abdala	0

Semifinals
(Venezuela) Rodríguez – Moreno	0
(Paraguay) Michelle – Corrales	2
(Peru) Allcca – Gaona	0
(Brazil) Carol – Rebecca	2

Final
(Paraguay) Michelle – Corrales	0
(Brazil) Carol – Rebecca	2
Bronze medal match
(Venezuela) Rodríguez – Moreno	0
(Peru) Allcca – Gaona	2

==== Final classification ====
Rank	Team	Country	Win/loss
1st place, gold medalist(s)	Carolina Solberg Salgado – Rebecca Cavalcante	Brazil	5–0
2nd place, silver medalist(s)	Michelle Valiente – Giuliana Corrales	Paraguay	4–1
3rd place, bronze medalist(s)	Lisbeth Allcca – Claudia Gaona	Peru	4–1
4	Darlín Rodríguez – Valeria Moreno	Venezuela	3–2
5	Brenda Churin – Belén Enríquez	Argentina	3–2
6	Fiorella Nuñez – Denisse Álvarez	Paraguay	2–3
7	Ariana Vilela – Valeska Cherrez	Ecuador	2–3
8	Agostina Ghihliazza – Morena Abdala	Argentina	1–4
9	Jeisy Velásquez – Majo Galindo	Bolivia	2–2
10	Mercy Beleño – Sara Pérez	Colombia	1–3
11	Ale Dubost – Sofía Ohlsson	Chile	1–3
12	Camila Arnez – Carla Valda	Bolivia	0–4
