= Esteban Grimalt =

Chilean beach volleyball player (born 1991)

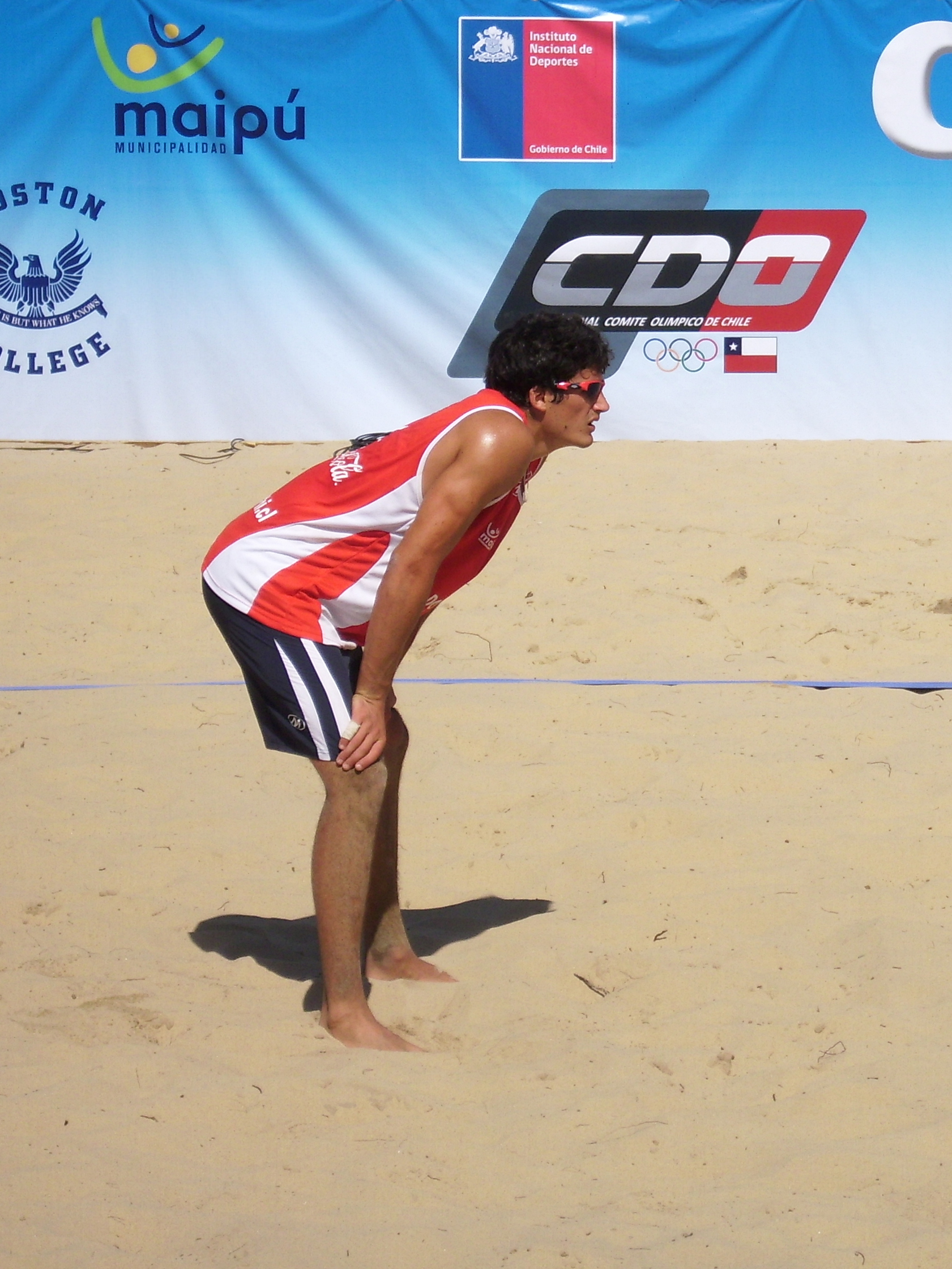

Personal information
- Nationality: Chile
- Born: 9 January 1991 (age 35); Santiago, Chile
- Height: 1.93 m (6 ft 4 in)
- Weight: 96 kg (212 lb)
Honours
Men's beach volleyball
Representing Chile
Pan American Games
Gold medal – first place	2019 Lima	Beach
Bronze medal – third place	2023 Santiago	Beach
South American Games
Gold medal – first place	2022 Asunción	Beach
Silver medal – second place	2014 Santiago	Beach
Bronze medal – third place	2010 Medellín	Beach
Bronze medal – third place	2018 Cochabamba	Beach
Bronze medal – third place	2026 Santa Fe	Beach
Bolivarian Games
Gold medal – first place	2013 Trujillo	Beach
Silver medal – second place	2017 Santa Marta	Beach

Esteban Mauricio Grimalt Fuster (Note: In this Spanish name, the first or paternal surname is Grimalt and the second or maternal family name is Fuster.) (born 9 January 1991) is a Chilean Olympic beach volleyball player.

His greatest achievements are Gold in the South American Circuit of Viña del Mar 2009, Gold in the Continental Tour Paraguay 2013, Gold in Continental Tour Bolivia 2013, Gold in Continental Tour Perú 2014, and Silver in the 2014 South American Games. He classified for the 2016 Olympics in Rio de Janeiro with his cousin Marco Grimalt and received Gold in the 2019 Panamerican Games.

He represented Chile at the 2020 Summer Olympics.
