= Giuliana Corrales =

Paraguayan beach volleyball player

Giuliana Poletti
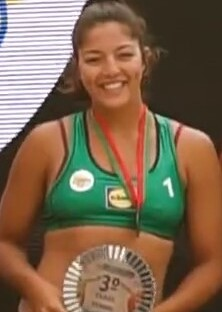
- Poletti in 2022

Personal information
- Full name: Giuliana Poletti Corrales
- Nationality: Paraguay
- Born: 30 September 2000 (age 26) Asunción

Sport
- Sport: Beach volleyball
Medal record
Women's beach volleyball
Representing Paraguay
South American Games
Silver medal – second place	2022 Asunción	Beach
Silver medal – second place	2026 Santa Fe	Beach

Giuliana Poletti Corrales (born September 30, 2000) is a Paraguayan beach volleyball player. Alongside her partner Michelle Valiente, she participated in the 2024 Olympic Games in Paris, after winning, along their teammates Erika Mongelós and Fiorella Núñez, the CSV Olympic Qualifier held in Luque, Paraguay.

== Career ==
She started playing volleyball at Asunción's Colegio Internacional and participated in the institution's beauty contest in 2014 finishing as first runner-up, in 2015 she defended the colors of the Club Deportivo Alemán. In indoor volleyball she competed with the national team in the 2015 South American Children's Championship (U-16) in Tarapoto, Peru, an edition in which she was team captain, and finished in seventh position.

In 2015, she was part of the Paraguayan beach volleyball team along with María Janina Ocampos and Diana Mereles and competed in the 2nd edition of the World School Beach Volleyball Championship held in Aracaju, Brazil, obtaining the bronze medal, together they placed third in the Paraguayan U-23 circuit in 2017 in Asunción. In 2016 she debuted on the South American circuit held in Asunción alongside Cece Fernández, and with Romina Édiger in the Santa Cruz de la Sierra, on both occasions they finished in thirteenth position.

In 2017 she formed a duo with Patricia Caballero and obtained third place in the first stage of the Paraguayan circuit and the title in the second stage, and also in the third stage in Asunción, in this same venue they finished third in the last stage, together they played on the court when they defended Club Deportivo Internacional in the final of the closed tournament of the same year. Together with Laura Ovelar, they competed in the 2017 South American Youth Games in Santiago, and in the 2017 Bolivarian Games in Santa Marta, then, along with Michelle Valiente, they competed in the U21 World Cup in Nanjing and finished in ninth place.

In 2018, with partner Laura Ovelar, she participated at the 2018 Summer Youth Olympics in Buenos Aires.

In 2019, she and Michelle Valiente competed at the 2019 South American Beach Games, being eliminated in the quarterfinals.

In 2022, along with Laura Ovelar, she won the silver medal at the 2022 South American Games held in her hometown Asunción that year.

From 2020 to 2023 she went to study in the United States, at Texas A&M University–Corpus Christi, representing the Islanders team, forming a duo with Brooke Pertuit. In 2023, she resumed the duo with Laura Ovelar and finished in ninth place in the 2023 South American Beach Games in Santa Marta.
