= Beach volleyball at the 2019 Pan American Games – Men's tournament =

Beach volleyball – Men's tournament at the 2019 Pan American Games
- Venue: Estadio de Volley de Playa
- Dates: July 24–30
- Competitors: 32 from 16 nations

Medalists
Gold medal	Esteban Grimalt; Marco Grimalt	Chile
Silver medal	Lombardo Ontiveros; Juan Virgen	Mexico
Bronze medal	Julián Azaad; Nicolás Capogrosso	Argentina

The men's tournament competition of the beach volleyball events at the 2019 Pan American Games will take place between 24-30 of July at the Estadio de Volley de Playa a temporary venue in the San Miguel cluster. The defending Pan American Games champions are Rodolfo Ontiveros and Juan Virgen of Mexico.

Each of the 16 pairs in the tournament were placed in one of four groups of four teams apiece, and play a round-robin within that pool. The top two teams in each pool advanced to the quarterfinals. The third along with the fourth-placed teams in each group, were eliminated.

The 8 teams that advanced to the elimination rounds played a single-elimination tournament with a bronze medal match between the semifinal losers.

== Schedule ==
Date	Start	Finish	Phase
Wednesday July 24, 2019	10:40	14:50	Preliminaries
Thursday July 25, 2019	9:00	13:10	Preliminaries
Friday July 26, 2019	9:40	13:50	Preliminaries
Saturday July 27, 2019	10:40	14:50	Elimination stage/Quarterfinal qualifiers
Sunday July 28, 2019	10:40	14:50	Quarterfinals
Monday July 29, 2019	9:00	14:50	Semifinals
Tuesday July 30, 2019	10:50	14:30	Gold/Bronze medal matches

== Results ==
All times are local, PET (UTC−5).

=== Preliminary round ===
==== Group A ====
Pos	Team	Pld	W	L	Pts	SW	SL	SR	SPW	SPL	SPR	Qualification
1	Hernández – Gómez (VEN)	3	3	0	6	6	0	MAX	126	81	1.556	Quarterfinals
2	Leonardo – García (GUA)	3	2	1	5	4	2	2.000	121	93	1.301	Quarterfinals qualifying
3	Medina – Sánchez (DOM)	3	1	2	4	2	4	0.500	106	109	0.972	Quarterfinals qualifying
4	Vásquez – Seminario (PER)	3	0	3	3	0	6	0.000	58	126	0.460	Placement 13th–16th

Source: Lima 2019

24 July 2019; 14:50	Vásquez – Seminario (Peru)	0–2	(Dominican Republic) Medina – Sánchez	Estadio Voleibol de Playa – Court 1 Referees: Katrina Meyer (USA), Omid Mojtahedi (CAN)
24 July 2019; 14:50	(11–21, 14–21); Report			Estadio Voleibol de Playa – Court 1 Referees: Katrina Meyer (USA), Omid Mojtahedi (CAN)

24 July 2019; 14:50	Leonardo – García (Guatemala)	0–2	(Venezuela) Hernández – Gómez	Estadio Voleibol de Playa – Court 2 Referees: Erick Martínez (CUB), Sergio Silva Duarte (NCA)
24 July 2019; 14:50	(18–21, 19–21); Report			Estadio Voleibol de Playa – Court 2 Referees: Erick Martínez (CUB), Sergio Silva Duarte (NCA)

25 July 2019; 12:20	Vásquez – Seminario (Peru)	0–2	(Venezuela) Hernández – Gómez	Estadio Voleibol de Playa – Court 1 Referees: Sergio Silva Duarte (NCA), Sergio Cifuentes (GUA
25 July 2019; 12:20	(8–21, 8–21); Report			Estadio Voleibol de Playa – Court 1 Referees: Sergio Silva Duarte (NCA), Sergio Cifuentes (GUA

25 July 2019; 12:20	Leonardo – García (Guatemala)	2–0	(Dominican Republic) Medina – Sánchez	Estadio Voleibol de Playa – Court 2 Referees: Omid Mojtahedi (CAN), Claudia Guerrero (HON)
25 July 2019; 12:20	(21–19, 21–15); Report			Estadio Voleibol de Playa – Court 2 Referees: Omid Mojtahedi (CAN), Claudia Guerrero (HON)

26 July 2019; 13:50	Vásquez – Seminario (Peru)	0–2	(Guatemala) Leonardo – García	Estadio Voleibol de Playa – Court 1 Referees: Marcos Braga (BRA), Marlene Hernández (MEX)
26 July 2019; 13:50	(11–21, 6–21); Report			Estadio Voleibol de Playa – Court 1 Referees: Marcos Braga (BRA), Marlene Hernández (MEX)

26 July 2019; 13:50	Hernández – Gómez (Venezuela)	2–0	(Dominican Republic) Medina – Sánchez	Estadio Voleibol de Playa – Court 2 Referees: Hernán D. Lovera (COL), Sergio Silva Duarte (NCA)
26 July 2019; 13:50	(21–14, 21–16); Report			Estadio Voleibol de Playa – Court 2 Referees: Hernán D. Lovera (COL), Sergio Silva Duarte (NCA)

==== Group B ====
Pos	Team	Pld	W	L	Pts	SW	SL	SR	SPW	SPL	SPR	Qualification
1	Capogrosso – Azaad (ARG)	3	3	0	6	6	1	6.000	139	89	1.562	Quarterfinals
2	Satterfield – Burik (USA)	3	2	1	5	5	2	2.500	127	106	1.198	Quarterfinals qualifying
3	Escobar – Vargas (ESA)	3	1	2	4	2	4	0.500	88	116	0.759	Quarterfinals qualifying
4	Stewart – Phillip (TTO)	3	0	3	3	0	6	0.000	83	126	0.659	Placement 13th–16th

Source: Lima 2019

24 July 2019; 14:00	Satterfield – Burik (United States)	2–0	(El Salvador) Escobar – Vargas	Estadio Voleibol de Playa – Court 1 Referees: Claudia Vega (PER), Marcos Braga (BRA)
24 July 2019; 14:00	(21–12, 21–10); Report			Estadio Voleibol de Playa – Court 1 Referees: Claudia Vega (PER), Marcos Braga (BRA)

24 July 2019; 14:50	Capogrosso – Azaad (Argentina)	2–0	(Trinidad and Tobago) Stewart – Phillip	Estadio Voleibol de Playa – Court 2 Referees: Carolina Piston (URU), Eduardo A. Paiz (ESA)
24 July 2019; 14:50	(21–15, 21–7); Report			Estadio Voleibol de Playa – Court 2 Referees: Carolina Piston (URU), Eduardo A. Paiz (ESA)

25 July 2019; 13:10	Satterfield – Burik (United States)	2–0	(Trinidad and Tobago) Stewart – Phillip	Estadio Voleibol de Playa – Court 1 Referees: Rocio Lai Delgado (DOM), Marlene Hernández (MEX)
25 July 2019; 13:10	(21–13, 21–16); Report			Estadio Voleibol de Playa – Court 1 Referees: Rocio Lai Delgado (DOM), Marlene Hernández (MEX)

25 July 2019; 13:10	Capogrosso – Azaad (Argentina)	2–0	(El Salvador) Escobar – Vargas	Estadio Voleibol de Playa – Court 2 Referees: Katrina Meyer (USA), Erick Martínez (CUB)
25 July 2019; 13:10	(21–12, 21–12); Report			Estadio Voleibol de Playa – Court 2 Referees: Katrina Meyer (USA), Erick Martínez (CUB)

26 July 2019; 10:30	Satterfield – Burik (United States)	1–2	(Argentina) Capogrosso – Azaad	Estadio Voleibol de Playa – Court 1 Referees: Elvin Ryan Germain (LCA), Carolina Piston (URU)
26 July 2019; 10:30	(21–19, 10–21, 12–15)			Estadio Voleibol de Playa – Court 1 Referees: Elvin Ryan Germain (LCA), Carolina Piston (URU)

26 July 2019; 10:30	Stewart – Phillip (Trinidad and Tobago)	0–2	(El Salvador) Escobar – Vargas	Estadio Voleibol de Playa – Court 2 Referees: Lino J. Salamanca (VEN), Claudia Vega (PER)
26 July 2019; 10:30	(19–21, 13–21); Report			Estadio Voleibol de Playa – Court 2 Referees: Lino J. Salamanca (VEN), Claudia Vega (PER)

==== Group C ====
Pos	Team	Pld	W	L	Pts	SW	SL	SR	SPW	SPL	SPR	Qualification
1	Brandão – Dealtry (BRA)	3	2	1	5	5	2	2.500	135	112	1.205	Quarterfinals
2	González – Reyes (CUB)	3	2	1	5	5	3	1.667	142	131	1.084	Quarterfinals qualifying
3	Vieyto – Cairus (URU)	3	2	1	5	4	3	1.333	124	115	1.078	Quarterfinals qualifying
4	Alpízar – Valenciano (CRC)	3	0	3	3	0	6	0.000	84	127	0.661	Placement 13th–16th

Source: Lima 2019

24 July 2019; 11:30	Brandão – Dealtry (Brazil)	2–0	(Costa Rica) Alpízar – Valenciano	Estadio Voleibol de Playa – Court 1 Referees: Omid Mojtahedi (CAN), Claudia Vega (PER)
24 July 2019; 11:30	(21–13, 21–14); Report			Estadio Voleibol de Playa – Court 1 Referees: Omid Mojtahedi (CAN), Claudia Vega (PER)

24 July 2019; 11:30	González – Reyes (Cuba)	1–2	(Uruguay) Vieyto – Cairus	Estadio Voleibol de Playa – Court 2 Referees: Diego M. Medina (ARG), Sergio Silvia Durate (NCA)
24 July 2019; 11:30	(21–15, 16–21, 8–15); Report			Estadio Voleibol de Playa – Court 2 Referees: Diego M. Medina (ARG), Sergio Silvia Durate (NCA)

25 July 2019; 9:50	Brandão – Dealtry (Brazil)	2–0	(Uruguay) Vieyto – Cairus	Estadio Voleibol de Playa – Court 1 Referees: Claudia Vega (PER), Lino J. Salamanca (VEN)
25 July 2019; 9:50	(21–16, 21–14); Report			Estadio Voleibol de Playa – Court 1 Referees: Claudia Vega (PER), Lino J. Salamanca (VEN)

25 July 2019; 9:50	González – Reyes (Cuba)	2–0	(Costa Rica) Alpízar – Valenciano	Estadio Voleibol de Playa – Court 2 Referees: Marcos Braga (BRA), Claudia Guerrero (HON)
25 July 2019; 9:50	(21–13, 21–16); Report			Estadio Voleibol de Playa – Court 2 Referees: Marcos Braga (BRA), Claudia Guerrero (HON)

26 July 2019; 13:00	Brandão – Dealtry (Brazil)	1–2	(Cuba) González – Reyes	Estadio Voleibol de Playa – Court 1 Referees: Suzanne B. Lowry (USA), Eduardo A. Paiz(ESA)
26 July 2019; 13:00	(21–16, 14–21, 16–18); Report			Estadio Voleibol de Playa – Court 1 Referees: Suzanne B. Lowry (USA), Eduardo A. Paiz(ESA)

26 July 2019; 13:00	Vieyto – Cairus (Uruguay)	2–0	(Costa Rica) Alpízar – Valenciano	Estadio Voleibol de Playa – Court 2 Referees: Diego M. Medina (ARG), Rocio Lai Delgado (DOM)
26 July 2019; 13:00	(22–20, 21–8); Report			Estadio Voleibol de Playa – Court 2 Referees: Diego M. Medina (ARG), Rocio Lai Delgado (DOM)

==== Group D ====
Pos	Team	Pld	W	L	Pts	SW	SL	SR	SPW	SPL	SPR	Qualification
1	M. Grimalt – E. Grimalt (CHI)	3	3	0	6	6	2	3.000	149	124	1.202	Quarterfinals
2	Ontiveros – Virgen (MEX)	3	2	1	5	5	2	2.500	130	118	1.102	Quarterfinals qualifying
3	Nusbaum – Plantinga (CAN)	3	1	2	4	2	4	0.500	110	132	0.833	Quarterfinals qualifying
4	Mora – López (NCA)	3	0	3	3	1	6	0.167	134	149	0.899	Placement 13th–16th

Source: Lima 2019

24 July 2019; 10:40	Nusbaum – Plantinga (Canada)	2–0	(Nicaragua) Mora – López	Estadio Voleibol de Playa – Court 1 Referees: Marcos Braga (BRA), Sergio Cifuentes (GUA)
24 July 2019; 10:40	(22–20, 30–28); Report			Estadio Voleibol de Playa – Court 1 Referees: Marcos Braga (BRA), Sergio Cifuentes (GUA)

24 July 2019; 10:40	M. Grimalt – E. Grimalt (Chile)	2–1	(Mexico) Ontiveros – Virgen	Estadio Voleibol de Playa – Court 2 Referees: Erick Martínez (CUB), Carolina B. Piston (URU)
24 July 2019; 10:40	(21–15, 16–21, 15–10); Report			Estadio Voleibol de Playa – Court 2 Referees: Erick Martínez (CUB), Carolina B. Piston (URU)

25 July 2019; 9:00	Nusbaum – Plantinga (Canada)	0–2	(Mexico) Ontiveros – Virgen	Estadio Voleibol de Playa – Court 1 Referees: Eduardo A. Paiz (ESA), Justo Ramon Benitez (PAR)
25 July 2019; 9:00	(14–21, 19–21); Report			Estadio Voleibol de Playa – Court 1 Referees: Eduardo A. Paiz (ESA), Justo Ramon Benitez (PAR)

25 July 2019; 9:00	M. Grimalt – E. Grimalt (Chile)	2–1	(Nicaragua) Mora – López	Estadio Voleibol de Playa – Court 2 Referees: Sergio Cifuentes (GUA), Carolina B. Piston (URU)
25 July 2019; 9:00	(21–19, 19–21, 15-13); Report			Estadio Voleibol de Playa – Court 2 Referees: Sergio Cifuentes (GUA), Carolina B. Piston (URU)

26 July 2019; 9:40	Nusbaum – Plantinga (Canada)	0–2	(Chile) M. Grimalt – E. Grimalt	Estadio Voleibol de Playa – Court 1
26 July 2019; 9:40	(11–21, 14–21)			Estadio Voleibol de Playa – Court 1

26 July 2019; 9:50	Ontiveros – Virgen (Mexico)	2–0	(Nicaragua) Mora – López	Estadio Voleibol de Playa – Court 2 Referees: Eduardo A. Paiz (ESA), Diego M. Medina (ARG)
26 July 2019; 9:50	(21–16, 21–17); Report			Estadio Voleibol de Playa – Court 2 Referees: Eduardo A. Paiz (ESA), Diego M. Medina (ARG)

=== Placement 13th–16th ===
13th–16th semifinals
Stewart – Phillip (TTO)	1
Alpízar – Valenciano (CRC)	2
Vásquez – Seminario (PER)	0
Mora – López (NCA)	2

13th–14th place match
Alpízar – Valenciano (CRC)	0
Mora – López (NCA)	2
15th–16th place match
Stewart – Phillip (TTO)	2
Vásquez – Seminario (PER)	0

==== 13th–16th semifinals ====
27 July 2019; 10:40	Stewart – Phillip (Trinidad and Tobago)	1–2	(Costa Rica) Alpízar – Valenciano	Estadio Voleibol de Playa – Court 2 Referees: Claudia Guerrero (HON), Omid Mojtahedi (CAN)
27 July 2019; 10:40	(21–19, 16–21, 12–15); Report			Estadio Voleibol de Playa – Court 2 Referees: Claudia Guerrero (HON), Omid Mojtahedi (CAN)

27 July 2019; 11:30	Vásquez – Seminario (Peru)	0–2	(Nicaragua) Mora – López	Estadio Voleibol de Playa – Court 2 Referees: Justo Ramón Benítez (PAR), Katrina Meyer (USA)
27 July 2019; 11:30	(7–21, 15–21); Report			Estadio Voleibol de Playa – Court 2 Referees: Justo Ramón Benítez (PAR), Katrina Meyer (USA)

==== 15th–16th place match ====
27 July 2019; 14:50	Stewart – Phillip (Trinidad and Tobago)	2–0	(Peru) Vásquez – Seminario	Estadio Voleibol de Playa – Court 2 Referees: Eduardo A. Paiz (ESA), Elvin Ryan Germain (LCA)
27 July 2019; 14:50	(21–19, 21–16); Report			Estadio Voleibol de Playa – Court 2 Referees: Eduardo A. Paiz (ESA), Elvin Ryan Germain (LCA)

==== 13th–14th place match ====
28 July 2019; 12:20	Alpízar – Valenciano (Costa Rica)	0–2	(Nicaragua) Mora – López	Estadio Voleibol de Playa – Court 2 Referees: Lino J. Salamanca (VEN), Suzanne B. Lowry (USA)
28 July 2019; 12:20	(16–21, 14–21); Report			Estadio Voleibol de Playa – Court 2 Referees: Lino J. Salamanca (VEN), Suzanne B. Lowry (USA)

=== Placement 9th–12th ===
9th–10th semifinals
Medina – Sánchez (DOM)	0
Satterfield – Burik (USA)	2
Escobar – Vargas (ESA)	1
Leonardo – García (GUA)	2

9th place match
Satterfield – Burik (USA)	1
Leonardo – García (GUA)	2
11th place match
Medina – Sánchez (DOM)	2
Escobar – Vargas (ESA)	0

==== 9th–12th semifinals ====
28 July 2019; 10:40	Medina – Sánchez (Dominican Republic)	0–2	(United States) Satterfield – Burik	Estadio Voleibol de Playa – Court 2 Referees: Eduardo A. Paiz (ESA), Claudia Vega (PER)
28 July 2019; 10:40	(13–21, 12–21); Report			Estadio Voleibol de Playa – Court 2 Referees: Eduardo A. Paiz (ESA), Claudia Vega (PER)

28 July 2019; 11:30	Escobar – Vargas (El Salvador)	1–2	(Guatemala) Leonardo – García	Estadio Voleibol de Playa – Court 2 Referees: Erick Martínez (CUB), Carolina Piston (URU)
28 July 2019; 11:30	(13–21, 21–17, 11–15)			Estadio Voleibol de Playa – Court 2 Referees: Erick Martínez (CUB), Carolina Piston (URU)

==== 11th–12th place match ====
28 July 2019; 14:50	Medina – Sánchez (Dominican Republic)	2–0	(El Salvador) Escobar – Vargas	Estadio Voleibol de Playa – Court 2 Referees: Justo Ramón Benitez (PAR), Sergio Silva Duarte (NCA)
28 July 2019; 14:50	(21–11, 21–14); Report			Estadio Voleibol de Playa – Court 2 Referees: Justo Ramón Benitez (PAR), Sergio Silva Duarte (NCA)

==== 9th–10th place match ====
29 July 2019; 9:00	Satterfield – Burik (United States)	1–2	(Guatemala) Leonardo – García	Estadio Voleibol de Playa – Court 2 Referees: Marlene Hernández (MEX), Sergio Cifuentes (GUA)
29 July 2019; 9:00	(24–22, 35–37, 11–15); Report			Estadio Voleibol de Playa – Court 2 Referees: Marlene Hernández (MEX), Sergio Cifuentes (GUA)

=== Placement 5th–8th ===
9th–12th semifinals
González – Reyes (CUB)	2
Hernández – Gómez (VEN)	1
Brandão – Dealtry (BRA)	0
Vieyto – Cairus (URU)	2

5th–6th place match
González – Reyes (CUB)	2
Vieyto – Cairus (URU)	0
7th–8th place match
Hernández – Gómez (VEN)	0
Brandão – Dealtry (BRA)	2

==== 5th–8th semifinals ====
29 July 2019; 9:00	González – Reyes (Cuba)	2–1	(Venezuela) Hernández – Gómez	Estadio Voleibol de Playa – Court 1 Referees: Diego M. Medina (ARG), Justo Ramón Benitez (PAR)
29 July 2019; 9:00	(14–21, 26–24, 15–12)			Estadio Voleibol de Playa – Court 1 Referees: Diego M. Medina (ARG), Justo Ramón Benitez (PAR)

29 July 2019; 9:50	Brandão – Dealtry (Brazil)	0–2	(Uruguay) Vieyto – Cairus	Estadio Voleibol de Playa – Court 1 Referees: Suzanne B. Lowry (USA), Lino J. Salamanca (VEN)
29 July 2019; 9:50	(13–21, 20–22); Report			Estadio Voleibol de Playa – Court 1 Referees: Suzanne B. Lowry (USA), Lino J. Salamanca (VEN)

==== 7th–8th place match ====
29 July 2019; 10:50	Hernández – Gómez (Venezuela)	0–2	(Brazil) Brandão – Dealtry	Estadio Voleibol de Playa – Court 2 Referees: Marlene Hernández (MEX), Hernan D. Lovera (COL)
29 July 2019; 10:50	(17–21, 11–21); Report			Estadio Voleibol de Playa – Court 2 Referees: Marlene Hernández (MEX), Hernan D. Lovera (COL)

==== 5th–6th place match ====
29 July 2019; 10:50	González – Reyes (Cuba)	2–0	(Uruguay) Vieyto – Cairus	Estadio Voleibol de Playa – Court 1 Referees: Eduardo A. Paiz (ESA), Justo Ramón Benitez (PAR)
29 July 2019; 10:50	(21–17, 21–16); Report			Estadio Voleibol de Playa – Court 1 Referees: Eduardo A. Paiz (ESA), Justo Ramón Benitez (PAR)

=== Placement 1st–4th ===
Quarterfinals qualifying
González – Reyes (CUB)	2
Medina – Sánchez (DOM)	0
Satterfield – Burik (USA)	0
Nusbaum – Plantinga (CAN)	2
Ontiveros – Virgen (MEX)	2
Escobar – Vargas (ESA)	0
Leonardo – García (GUA)	0
Vieyto – Cairus (URU)	2

Quarterfinals
M. Grimalt – E. Grimalt (CHI)	2
González – Reyes (CUB)	0
Hernández – Gómez (VEN)	1
Nusbaum – Plantinga (CAN)	2
Brandão – Dealtry (BRA)	0
Ontiveros – Virgen (MEX)	2
Capogrosso – Azaad (ARG)	2
Vieyto – Cairus (URU)	1

Semifinals
M. Grimalt – E. Grimalt (CHI)	2
Nusbaum – Plantinga (CAN)	0
Ontiveros – Virgen (MEX)	2
Capogrosso – Azaad (ARG)	1

Gold medal match
M. Grimalt – E. Grimalt (CHI)	2
Ontiveros – Virgen (MEX)	1
Bronze medal match
Nusbaum – Plantinga (CAN)	0
Capogrosso – Azaad (ARG)	2

==== Quarterfinals qualifying ====
Losers of Quarterfinals qualifying are transferred to Placement 9th–12th.

27 July 2019; 10:40	Satterfield – Burik (United States)	0–2	(Canada) Nusbaum – Plantinga	Estadio Voleibol de Playa – Court 1 Referees: Marcos Braga (BRA), Lino J. Salamanca (VEN)
27 July 2019; 10:40	(19–21, 12–21); Report			Estadio Voleibol de Playa – Court 1 Referees: Marcos Braga (BRA), Lino J. Salamanca (VEN)

27 July 2019; 11:30	González – Reyes (Cuba)	2–0	(Dominican Republic) Medina – Sánchez	Estadio Voleibol de Playa – Court 1 Referees: Suzanne B. Lowry (USA), Marlene Hernández (MEX)
27 July 2019; 11:30	(21–17, 21–14); Report			Estadio Voleibol de Playa – Court 1 Referees: Suzanne B. Lowry (USA), Marlene Hernández (MEX)

27 July 2019; 14:00	Ontiveros – Virgen (Mexico)	2–0	(El Salvador) Escobar – Vargas	Estadio Voleibol de Playa – Court 1 Referees: Katrina Meyer (USA), Claudia Vega (PER)
27 July 2019; 14:00	(21–16, 21–12); Report			Estadio Voleibol de Playa – Court 1 Referees: Katrina Meyer (USA), Claudia Vega (PER)

27 July 2019; 14:50	Leonardo – García (Guatemala)	0–2	(Uruguay) Vieyto – Cairus	Estadio Voleibol de Playa – Court 1 Referees: Omid Mojtahedi (CAN), Claudia Guerrero (HON)
27 July 2019; 14:50	(15–21, 17–21); Report			Estadio Voleibol de Playa – Court 1 Referees: Omid Mojtahedi (CAN), Claudia Guerrero (HON)

==== Quarterfinals ====
Losers of Quarterfinals are transferred to Placement 5th–8th.

28 July 2019; 10:40	M. Grimalt – E. Grimalt (Chile)	2–0	(Cuba) González – Reyes	Estadio Voleibol de Playa – Court 1 Referees: Marcos Braga (BRA), Omid Mojtahedi (CAN)
28 July 2019; 10:40	(21–13, 21–16); Report			Estadio Voleibol de Playa – Court 1 Referees: Marcos Braga (BRA), Omid Mojtahedi (CAN)

28 July 2019; 11:30	Hernández – Gómez (Venezuela)	1–2	(Canada) Nusbaum – Plantinga	Estadio Voleibol de Playa – Court 1 Referees: Katrina Meyer (USA), Claudia Guerrero (HON)
28 July 2019; 11:30	(26–28, 24–22, 7–15); Report			Estadio Voleibol de Playa – Court 1 Referees: Katrina Meyer (USA), Claudia Guerrero (HON)

28 July 2019; 14:00	Brandão – Dealtry (Brazil)	0–2	(Mexico) Ontiveros – Virgen	Estadio Voleibol de Playa – Court 1 Referees: Omid Mojtahedi (CAN), Diego M. Medina (ARG)
28 July 2019; 14:00	(25–27, 20–22); Report			Estadio Voleibol de Playa – Court 1 Referees: Omid Mojtahedi (CAN), Diego M. Medina (ARG)

28 July 2019; 14:50	Capogrosso – Azaad (Argentina)	2–1	(Uruguay) Vieyto – Cairus	Estadio Voleibol de Playa – Court 1 Referees: Suzanne B. Lowry (USA), Marcos Braga (BRA)
28 July 2019; 14:50	(14–21, 21–14, 18–16); Report			Estadio Voleibol de Playa – Court 1 Referees: Suzanne B. Lowry (USA), Marcos Braga (BRA)

==== Semifinals ====
29 July 2019; 14:00	M. Grimalt – E. Grimalt (Chile)	2–0	(Canada) Nusbaum – Plantinga	Estadio Voleibol de Playa – Court 1 Referees: Marcos Braga (BRA), Marlene Hernández (MEX)
29 July 2019; 14:00	(21–12, 21–14); Report			Estadio Voleibol de Playa – Court 1 Referees: Marcos Braga (BRA), Marlene Hernández (MEX)

29 July 2019; 14:50	Ontiveros – Virgen (Mexico)	2–1	(Argentina) Capogrosso – Azaad	Estadio Voleibol de Playa – Court 1 Referees: Omid Mojtahedi (CAN), Katrina Meyer (USA)
29 July 2019; 14:50	(9–21, 21–17, 15–12); Report			Estadio Voleibol de Playa – Court 1 Referees: Omid Mojtahedi (CAN), Katrina Meyer (USA)

==== Bronze medal match ====
30 July 2019; 11:40	Nusbaum – Plantinga (Canada)	0–2	(Argentina) Capogrosso – Azaad	Estadio Voleibol de Playa – Court 1 Referees: Katrina Meyer (USA), Sergio Silva Duarte (NCA)
30 July 2019; 11:40	(17–21, 18–21); Report			Estadio Voleibol de Playa – Court 1 Referees: Katrina Meyer (USA), Sergio Silva Duarte (NCA)

==== Gold medal match ====
30 July 2019; 14:30	M. Grimalt – E. Grimalt (Chile)	2–1	(Mexico) Ontiveros – Virgen	Estadio Voleibol de Playa – Court 1 Referees: Suzanne B. Lowry (USA), Omid Mojtahedi (CAN)
30 July 2019; 14:30	(21–19, 22–24, 15–10)			Estadio Voleibol de Playa – Court 1 Referees: Suzanne B. Lowry (USA), Omid Mojtahedi (CAN)

== Final standings ==
Rank	Team
1st place, gold medalist(s)	Marco Grimalt – Esteban Grimalt (CHI)
2nd place, silver medalist(s)	Lombardo Ontiveros – Juan Virgen (MEX)
3rd place, bronze medalist(s)	Nicolás Capogrosso – Julián Azaad (ARG)
4	Aaron Nusbaum – Michael Plantinga (CAN)
5	Sergio González – Luis Reyes (CUB)
6	Mauricio Vieyto – Marco Cairus (URU)
7	Oscar Brandão – Thiago Dealtry (BRA)
8	Rolando Hernández – José Gómez (VEN)
9	Andy Leonardo – Luis García (GUA)
10	Ian Satterfield – Mark Burik (USA)
11	Alex Medina – William Sánchez (DOM)
12	Carlos Escobar – David Vargas (ESA)
13	Rubén Mora – Danny López (NCA)
14	Víctor Alpízar – Sebastián Valenciano (CRC)
15	Daynte Stewart – Marlon Phillip (TTO)
16	Gabriel Vásquez – Bruno Seminario (PER)
