= Beach volleyball at the 2023 South American Beach Games =

Beach volleyball competitions at the 2023 South American Beach Games

- Venue: Parque Multideportivo 500 Años
- Dates: July 18−21
- Nations: 12

The Beach volleyball tournaments at the 2023 South American Beach Games in Santa Marta, Colombia were held between July 18 and 21, 2023 at the Parque Multideportivo 500 Años.
It was organized by ODESUR, with the supervision of Confederación Sudamericana de Voleibol jointly with the Federación Colombiana de Voleibol.

== Schedule ==
The competition schedule is as follows:

G	Group stage	¼	Quarterfinals	½	Semifinals	B	Bronze medal match	F	Gold medal match

Date Event	Tue 18	Wed 19	Thu 20		Fri 21	
Men's beach volleyball	G	G	¼	½	B	F
Women's beach volleyball	G	G	¼	½	B	F

== Medal summary ==
=== Medal table ===
* Host nation (Colombia)

Rank	Nation	Gold	Silver	Bronze	Total
1	Chile (CHI)	1	0	0	1
1	Paraguay (PAR)	1	0	0	1
3	Peru (PER)	0	1	0	1
3	Uruguay (URU)	0	1	0	1
5	Colombia (COL)*	0	0	1	1
5	Ecuador (ECU)	0	0	1	1
Totals (6 entries)		2	2	2	6

=== Medalists ===
Event	Gold	Silver	Bronze
Men	Chile; Noé Aravena; Vicente Droguett	Uruguay; Hans Hannibal; Nicolás Llambías	Colombia; Juan Carlos Noriega; Yeferson De La Hoz
Women	Paraguay; Erika Mongelos; Michelle Valiente	Peru; Claudia Gaona; Lisbeth Allcca Merino	Ecuador; Karelys Simisterra; Valeska Cherrez

== Participation ==
Twelve nations participated in beach volleyball events of the 2023 South American Beach Games.

- Argentina
- Bolivia
- Chile
- Colombia
- Curaçao
- Ecuador
- Panama
- Paraguay
- Peru
- Suriname
- Uruguay
- Venezuela

== Men's beach volleyball competition ==
=== Group stage ===
==== Group A ====
Pos	Team	Pld	W	L	Pts	SW	SL	SR	SPW	SPL	SPR	Qualification
1	COL2 Noriega/De la Hoz	3	3	0	6	6	1	6.000	139	111	1.252	Quarterfinals
2	URU1 Hannibal/Llambias	3	2	1	5	5	2	2.500	134	97	1.381	Quarterfinals
3	BOL Calvo/Salvatierra	3	1	2	4	2	4	0.500	94	111	0.847	
4	PER Guerrero/Parreño	3	0	3	3	0	6	0.000	78	126	0.619	

Source: SantaMarta2023.com

==== Group B ====
Pos	Team	Pld	W	L	Pts	SW	SL	SR	SPW	SPL	SPR	Qualification
1	ARG1 Sosaya/Gauto	3	3	0	6	6	1	6.000	129	92	1.402	Quarterfinals
2	PAR Massare/Melgarejo	3	2	1	5	5	2	2.500	137	106	1.292	Quarterfinals
3	URU2 Bailon/Cairus	3	1	2	4	2	4	0.500	91	115	0.791	
4	PAN Ortiz/Acosta	3	0	3	3	0	6	0.000	82	126	0.651	

Source: SantaMarta2023.com

==== Group C ====
Pos	Team	Pld	W	L	Pts	SW	SL	SR	SPW	SPL	SPR	Qualification
1	CHI1 Aravena/Droguett	3	3	0	6	6	0	MAX	126	83	1.518	Quarterfinals
2	ECU2 Estupiñán/Quiñonez	3	2	1	5	4	3	1.333	132	127	1.039	Quarterfinals
3	ECU1 León/Tenorio	3	1	2	4	3	4	0.750	130	125	1.040	
4	CUW Paulina/Valeriano	3	0	3	3	0	6	0.000	73	126	0.579	

Source: SantaMarta2023.com

==== Group D ====
Pos	Team	Pld	W	L	Pts	SW	SL	SR	SPW	SPL	SPR	Qualification
1	VEN Rangél/Tovar	3	3	0	6	6	0	MAX	127	94	1.351	Quarterfinals
2	COL1 Murray/Manjarrés	3	2	1	5	4	2	2.000	120	123	0.976	Quarterfinals
3	ARG2 Inostroza/Gonzalez	3	1	2	4	2	4	0.500	123	128	0.961	
4	CHI2 Córdova/Acevedo	3	0	3	3	0	6	0.000	101	126	0.802	

Source: SantaMarta2023.com

=== Knockout stage ===
==== Bracket ====
Quarter-finals
20 July
URU1 Hannibal/Llambias	2
VEN Rangél/Tovar	0
20 July
ARG1 Sosaya/Gauto	2
ECU2 Estupiñán/Quiñonez	0
20 July
COL1 Murray/Manjarrés	1
COL2 Noriega/De la Hoz	2
20 July
PAR Massare/Melgarejo	0
CHI1 Aravena/Droguett	2

Semi-finals
20 July
URU1 Hannibal/Llambias	2
ARG1 Sosaya/Gauto	0
20 July
COL2 Noriega/De la Hoz	1
CHI1 Aravena/Droguett	2

Gold medal
21 July
URU1 Hannibal/Llambias	0
CHI1 Aravena/Droguett	2
Bronze medal
21 July
ARG1 Sosaya/Gauto	1
COL2 Noriega/De la Hoz	2

== Women's beach volleyball competition ==
=== Group stage ===
==== Group A ====
Pos	Team	Pld	W	L	Pts	SW	SL	SR	SPW	SPL	SPR	Qualification
1	VEN Brito/Regalado	3	3	0	6	6	0	MAX	126	78	1.615	Quarterfinals
2	COL1 Rios/Guzmán	3	2	1	5	4	2	2.000	108	97	1.113	Quarterfinals
3	COL2 Beltrán/Cardona	3	1	2	4	2	4	0.500	103	107	0.963	
4	BOL Padilla/Arando	3	0	3	3	0	6	0.000	71	126	0.563	

Source: SantaMarta2023.com

==== Group B ====
Pos	Team	Pld	W	L	Pts	SW	SL	SR	SPW	SPL	SPR	Qualification
1	ARG1 Ghigliazza/Churin	3	2	1	5	4	2	2.000	113	83	1.361	Quarterfinals
2	URU1 Bianchi/Acuña	3	2	1	5	4	2	2.000	111	115	0.965	Quarterfinals
3	URU2 Purtscher/Simón	3	1	2	4	2	4	0.500	114	115	0.991	
4	PAN Cuero/Lezcano	3	1	2	4	2	4	0.500	92	117	0.786	

Source: SantaMarta2023.com

==== Group C ====
Pos	Team	Pld	W	L	Pts	SW	SL	SR	SPW	SPL	SPR	Qualification
1	PER Gaona/Allcca	3	3	0	6	6	0	MAX	130	90	1.444	Quarterfinals
2	PAR1 Mongelos/Valiente	3	2	1	5	4	2	2.000	125	70	1.786	Quarterfinals
3	ECU2 Dvorquez/Batioja	3	1	2	4	2	4	0.500	95	98	0.969	
4	SUR Mak/Myr	3	0	3	3	0	6	0.000	34	126	0.270	

Source: SantaMarta2023.com

==== Group D ====
Pos	Team	Pld	W	L	Pts	SW	SL	SR	SPW	SPL	SPR	Qualification
1	CHI Vorpahl/Urretaviscaya	3	3	0	6	6	1	6.000	131	120	1.092	Quarterfinals
2	ECU1 Simisterra/Cherrez	3	2	1	5	4	4	1.000	160	162	0.988	Quarterfinals
3	PAR2 Poletti/Ovelar	3	1	2	4	4	5	0.800	169	155	1.090	
4	ARG2 Enriquez/Abdalá	3	0	3	3	2	6	0.333	136	159	0.855	

Source: SantaMarta2023.com

=== Knockout stage ===
==== Bracket ====
Quarter-finals
20 July
COL1 Rios/Guzmán	2
CHI Vorpahl/Urretaviscaya	0
20 July
ARG1 Ghigliazza/Churin	0
PAR1 Mongelos/Valiente	2
20 July
VEN Brito/Regalado	0
ECU1 Simisterra/Cherrez	2
20 July
URU1 Bianchi/Acuña	0
PER Gaona/Allcca	2

Semi-finals
20 July
COL1 Rios/Guzmán	1
PAR1 Mongelos/Valiente	2
20 July
ECU1 Simisterra/Cherrez	0
PER Gaona/Allcca	2

Gold medal
21 July
PAR1 Mongelos/Valiente	2
PER Gaona/Allcca	1
Bronze medal
21 July
COL1 Rios/Guzmán	0
ECU1 Simisterra/Cherrez	2
