= Michelle Valiente =

Paraguayan beach volleyball player

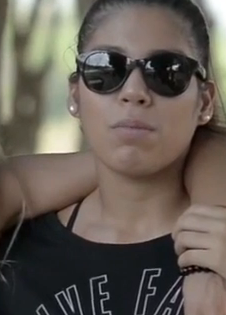
- Valiente in 2015

Personal information
- Full name: Michelle Sharon Valiente Amarilla
- Nationality: Paraguay
- Born: 7 May 1998 (age 28) Fernando de la Mora

Sport
- Sport: Beach volleyball
Medal record
Women's beach volleyball
Representing Paraguay
South American Games
Gold medal – first place	2018 Cochabamba	Beach
Silver medal – second place	2026 Santa Fe	Beach
South American Beach Games
Gold medal – first place	2023 Santa Marta	Beach
Bolivarian Games
Bronze medal – third place	2013 Trujillo	Beach

Michelle Sharon Valiente Amarilla (born May 7, 1998) is a Paraguayan beach volleyball player.

Alongside her partner Giuliana Poletti, she participated in the 2024 Olympic Games in Paris, after winning, along with their teammates Erika Mongelós and Fiorella Núñez, the CSV Olympic Qualifier held in Luque, Paraguay.

== Career ==
Her sporting career initially developed in indoor volleyball, and in 2012 she was representing the Paraguayan national team in the South American Under-20 Championship in Lima, and finished in eighth place, in the same year she also represented in the edition of the South American Under-18 Championship in Callao, when she played in the opposite position.

In 2013, she teamed up with Erika Mongelós in the qualifiers in Asunción for the 2014 Summer Youth Olympics, and they finished runners-up. They were bronze medalists in the XVII edition of the Bolivarian Games in Trujillo in 2013.

In 2014, she was alongside Erika Mongelós in the Cochabamba qualifying stage for the 2014 Summer Youth Olympics, winning the title, they went to compete in Nanjing at the Youth Olympics and finished in ninth place. Later that year they competed together in the 2014 U-21 World Championships in Larnaca and finished in seventeenth place, and ninth in the 2014 U19 World Championships in Porto.

In 2015, alongside Mongelós again, she qualified for the 2015 Beach Volleyball World Championships through the qualifiers, at which time they were coached by Brazilian Adriano Garrido, but it was alongside Gabriela Filippo that they competed in the championship, when she finished in seventeenth place.

In the 2018 season, with Patricia Caballero, she won the gold medal at the 2018 South American Games in Cochabamba.

She resumed the duo with Patricia Caballero on the 2019 South American Circuit on the Brasilia stage, they competed at the 2019 Beach Volleyball World Championships and the 2019 Pan American Games, where they finished in seventh place, they also finished fifth at the one-star World Circuit tournaments in Vaduz and Knokke-Heist.

In 2023, alongside Erika Mongelós, she won gold medals at the 2023 South American Beach Games in Santa Marta. Together they competed in the 2023 edition of the Beach Volleyball World Championships in Mexico, they also competed in the 2023 Pan American Games finishing in eleventh place.
