= Carolina Solberg Salgado =

Brazilian beach volleyball player (born 1987)

Carolina Solberg
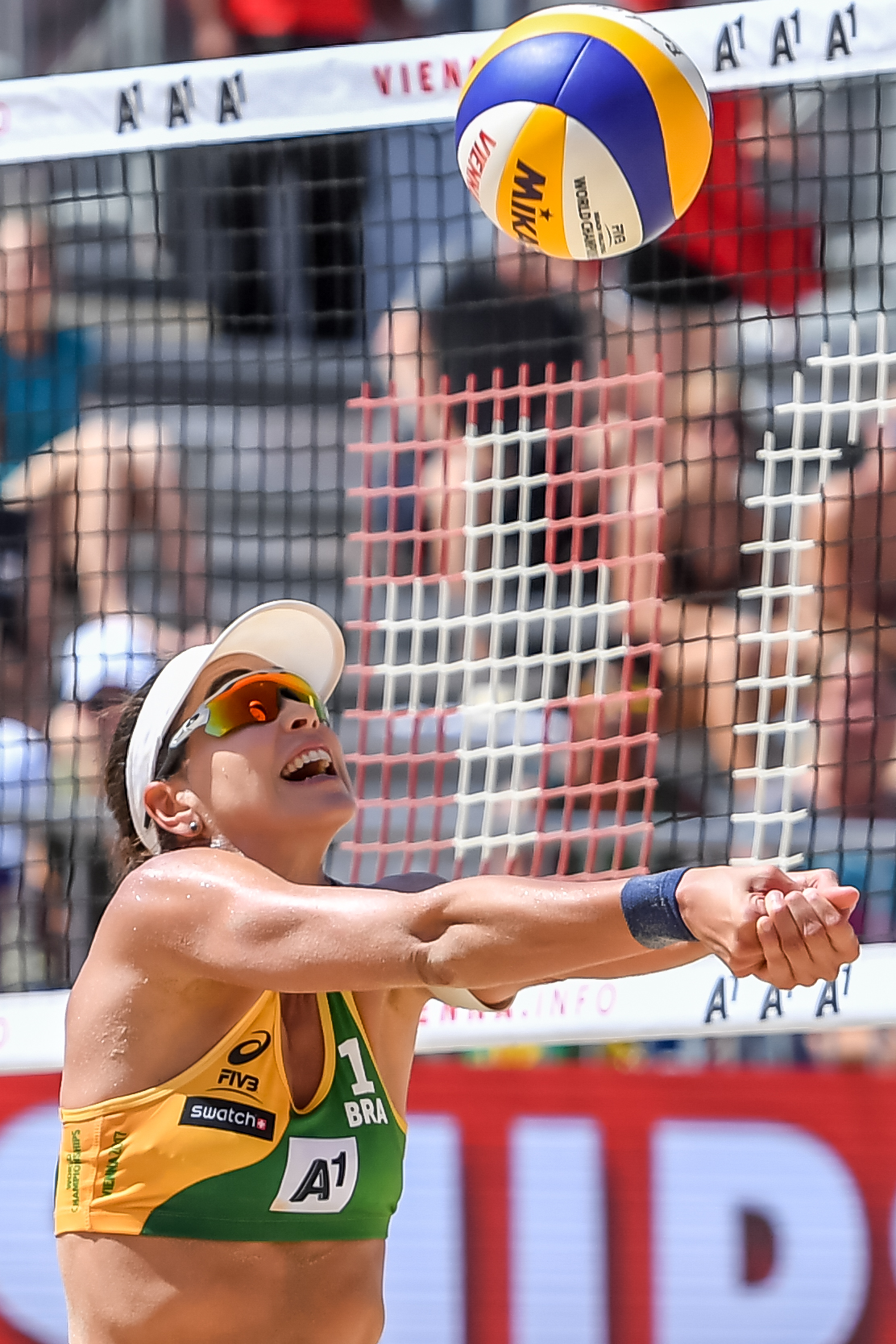
- Solberg at the 2017 World Championships

Personal information
- Full name: Carolina Salgado Solberg
- Nickname: Carol
- Born: 6 August 1987 (age 39); Rio de Janeiro, Brazil
- Height: 1.78 m (5 ft 10 in)

Beach volleyball information

Current teammate
Years	Teammate
2024–present	Rebecca Silva

Previous teammates
Years
- 2002
- 2003–15
- 2003–04 / 2021–24
- 2004
- 2005
- 2006
- 2017
- 2017–19
Teammate
- Isabel Grael
- Maria Clara Salgado
- Bárbara Seixas
- Taiana Lima
- Camila 'Camilinha' Saldanha
- Júlia Caldas
- Juliana Silva
- Maria Antonelli
Honours
World Championships
Bronze medal – third place	2025 Adelaide	Beach
Volleyball World Beach Pro Tour
Gold medal – first place	Season 2024	Beach
Gold medal – first place	Season 2025	Beach
South American Games
Gold medal – first place	2022 Asunción	Beach
Gold medal – first place	2026 Santa Fe	Beach
U21 World Championships
Gold medal – first place	2004 Porto Santo	Beach
Gold medal – first place	2005 Rio de Janeiro	Beach
Bronze medal – third place	2003 Saint Quay Portrieu	Beach
U18 World Championships
Silver medal – second place	2003 Pattaya	Beach

Carolina Solberg Salgado (born 6 August 1987) is a Brazilian beach volleyball player. She won a gold medal in the 2004 FIVB Under-18 World Championship and again in the Under-21 World Championship in 2005.

Playing alongside Bárbara Seixas, she represented Brazil in beach volleyball at the 2024 Summer Olympics.

Her siblings, Maria Clara Salgado and Pedro Solberg, are also successful players, as was their mother Isabel in past years.

Solberg is married to art director and 2013 Latin Grammy awardee Fernando Young.

== Opposition to Jair Bolsonaro ==
In 2020, Solberg was punished by the Brazilian Superior Court of Sports Justice (Superior Tribunal de Justiça Desportiva) for shouting "Bolsonaro, out!" during a live interview. She was fined 100,000 reais and was suspended for 6 games. She protested the punishment and in a second trial she was absolved of all charges. The Brazilian Volleyball Confederation accused her of "staining the sport", even though many other volleyball players have consistently showed support for Bolsonaro without any repercussions or reprimands.
