= Rebecca Cavalcante =

Brazilian beach volleyball player (born 1993)

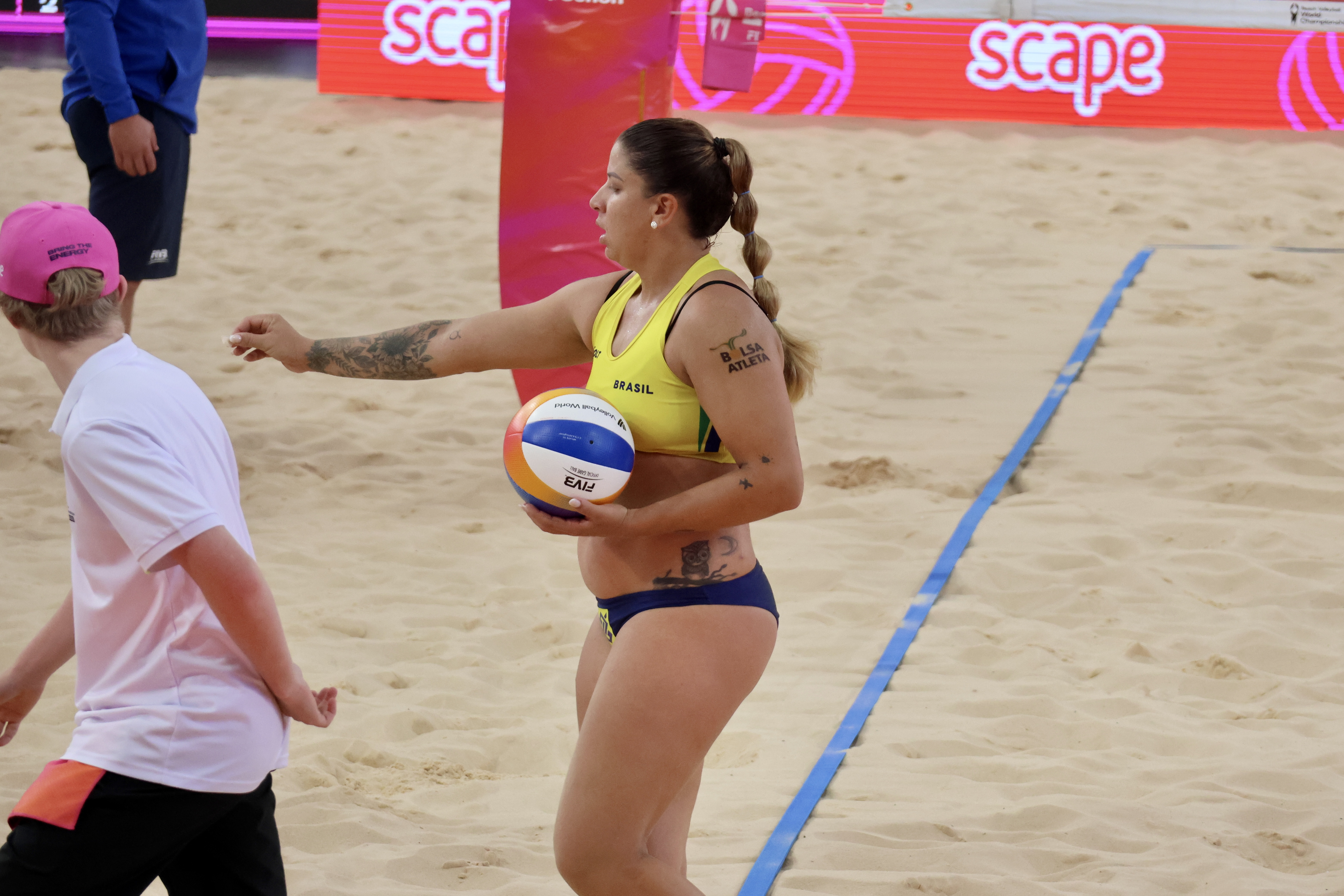
- Cavalcante at the 2025 World Championships

Personal information
- Full name: Rebecca Cavalcante Barbosa da Silva
- Born: 23 April 1993 (age 33); Fortaleza, Brazil
- Height: 1.75 m (5 ft 9 in)
- Weight: 78 kg (172 lb)

Beach volleyball information

Current teammate
Years	Teammate
2024–present	Carolina Solberg Salgado

Previous teammates
Years	Teammate
2017–21	Ana Patrícia Ramos
Honours
Women's beach volleyball
Representing Brazil
World Championships
Bronze medal – third place	2025 Adelaide	Beach
Volleyball World Beach Pro Tour
Gold medal – first place	2023 Chiang Mai	Beach
Silver medal – second place	2024 Guadalajara	Beach
South American Games
Gold medal – first place	2026 Santa Fe	Beach

Rebecca Cavalcante Barbosa da Silva (born 23 April 1993) is a Brazilian beach volleyball player. She competed for Brazil with Ana Patrícia Ramos in women's beach volleyball at the 2020 Summer Olympics.
