= Beach volleyball at the 2013 Bolivarian Games =

The beach volleyball tournaments, for the 2013 Bolivarian Games in Trujillo, starts on the 16 and ends on 29 November 2013. The beach volleyball competition takes place at Huanchaco Beach, in the Huanchaco Island in Trujillo.

== Medal table ==
Rank	Nation	Gold	Silver	Bronze	Total
1	Chile (CHI)	1	1	0	2
2	Colombia (COL)	1	0	0	1
3	Venezuela (VEN)	0	1	1	2
4	Paraguay (PAR)	0	0	1	1
Totals (4 entries)		2	2	2	6

=== Medalists ===
Event	Gold	Silver	Bronze
Men	Chile; Esteban Grimalt; Marco Grimalt	Venezuela; Jackson Henríquez; Luis Cociwa	Venezuela; Vicente Salazar; Carlos Rangel
Women	Colombia; Claudia Galindo; Andrea Galindo	Chile; Camila Pazdirek; Francisca Rivas	Paraguay; Erika Mongelos; Michelle Valiente

== See also ==
- Volleyball at the 2013 Bolivarian Games
