= Beach soccer at the 2023 South American Beach Games =

Beach soccer competitions at the 2023 South American Beach Games

- Venue: Parque Multideportivo 500 Años
- Dates: July 18−21
- Nations: 8

Beach soccer competitions at the 2023 South American Beach Games in Santa Marta, Colombia were held between July 18 and 21, 2023 at the Estadio Fútbol Playa of the Parque Multideportivo 500 Años.
It was organized by ODESUR, with the supervision of CONMEBOL jointly with the Colombian Football Federation.

== Schedule ==
The competition schedule is as follows:

G	Group stage	B	Bronze medal match	F	Gold medal match

Date Event	Tue 18	Wed 19	Thu 20	Fri 21	
Men's beach soccer	G	G	G	B	F

== Medal summary ==
=== Medal table ===
* Host nation (Colombia)

Rank	Nation	Gold	Silver	Bronze	Total
1	Brazil (BRA)	1	0	0	1
2	Colombia (COL)*	0	1	0	1
3	Argentina (ARG)	0	0	1	1
Totals (3 entries)		1	1	1	3

=== Medalists ===
Event	Gold	Silver	Bronze
Men	Brazil; Alisson Maciel; Brenno Carneiro; Datinha; Edson Hulk; Fabio Ribeiro; Francisco Da Silva Neto; João Marques; Lucas Teodósio Alves; Mão; Matheus Nascimento; Tiago Oliveira Dos Santos; Willian Araújo	Colombia; Alejandro Quintero; Andrés Rueda; Eduardo López; Emanuel Londoño; Juan Fernando Ossa; Julio Pantoja; Kevin Clavijo; Rafael Acosta; Sebastián Hernández Espitia; Victor Morales; Wilmar Donado; Wilson Cordoba	Argentina; Axel Rutterschmidt; Emanuel De Sosa; Emiliano Holmedilla; Lautaro Benaducci; Luca Becares; Lucas Ponzetti; Manuel Pomar; Mariano Mansilla; Nahuel Cipolletta; Nahuel Gigena; Nicanor Maciel; Sebastián Gómez Polatti

== Participation ==
Eight nations participated in beach soccer events of the 2023 South American Beach Games.

- Argentina
- Brazil
- Colombia
- Ecuador
- Panama
- Paraguay
- Uruguay
- Venezuela

== Group stage ==
The top teams of each group advanced to the Gold medal match, the second teams advanced to the Bronze medal match. The teams finishing in third and fourth proceeded to play in consolation matches against the teams finishing in the same position in the other group to determine their final rank.

=== Group A ===
Pos	Team	Pld	W	W+	WP	L	GF	GA	GD	Pts	Qualification
1	Colombia (H)	3	3	0	0	0	20	13	+7	9	Gold medal match
2	Paraguay	3	2	0	0	1	20	11	+9	6	Bronze medal match
3	Panama	3	1	0	0	2	12	19	−7	3	Fifth place match
4	Ecuador	3	0	0	0	3	9	18	−9	0	Seventh place match

Source: santamarta2023.com
(H) Host
18 July 2023
10:30 COT

Colombia	6–5	Paraguay
	Report

Parque Multideportivo 500 Años
18 July 2023
14:30 COT

Ecuador	3–5	Panama
	Report

Parque Multideportivo 500 Años
19 July 2023
09:00 COT

Panama	3–8	Paraguay
	Report

Parque Multideportivo 500 Años
19 July 2023
16:25 COT

Colombia	6–4	Ecuador
	Report

Parque Multideportivo 500 Años
20 July 2023
14:30 COT

Ecuador	2–7	Paraguay
	Report

Parque Multideportivo 500 Años
20 July 2023
16:00 COT

Panama	4–8	Colombia
	Report

Parque Multideportivo 500 Años

=== Group B ===
Pos	Team	Pld	W	W+	WP	L	GF	GA	GD	Pts	Qualification
1	Brazil	3	3	0	0	0	18	13	+5	9	Gold medal match
2	Argentina	3	1	0	0	2	12	12	0	3	Bronze medal match
3	Uruguay	3	1	0	0	2	17	16	+1	3	Fifth place match
4	Venezuela	3	0	0	1	2	13	19	−6	1	Seventh place match

Source: santamarta2023.com
18 July 2023
09:00 COT

Uruguay	8–4	Venezuela
	Report

Parque Multideportivo 500 Años
18 July 2023
16:00 COT

Brazil	4–3	Argentina
	Report

Parque Multideportivo 500 Años
19 July 2023
10:30 COT

Brazil	7–5	Uruguay
	Report

Parque Multideportivo 500 Años
19 July 2023
14:30 COT

Venezuela	4–4 (a.e.t.)	Argentina
	Report
Penalties
	5-4

Parque Multideportivo 500 Años
20 July 2023
09:00 COT

Uruguay	4–5	Argentina
	Report

Parque Multideportivo 500 Años
20 July 2023
10:30 COT

Venezuela	5–7	Brazil
	Report

Parque Multideportivo 500 Años

== Placement matches ==
=== Seventh place match ===
21 July 2023
08:30 COT

Ecuador	2–5	Venezuela
	Report

Parque Multideportivo 500 Años

=== Fifth place match ===
21 July 2023
10:00 COT

Panama	2–3	Uruguay
	Report

Parque Multideportivo 500 Años

=== Bronze medal match ===
21 July 2023
11:30 COT

Paraguay	5–6 (a.e.t.)	Argentina
	Report

Parque Multideportivo 500 Años

=== Gold medal match ===
21 July 2023
13:10 COT

Colombia	2–6	Brazil
	Report

Parque Multideportivo 500 Años
