= Beach volleyball at the 2019 Pan American Games =

- Beach volleyball pictogram
- Venue: Estadio de Volley de Playa
- Dates: July 24–30, 2019
- No. of events: 2 (1 men, 1 women)
- Competitors: 64 from 19 nations

Beach volleyball competitions at the 2019 Pan American Games in Lima, Peru were held between July 24 and 30 at the Estadio de Volley de Playa a temporary venue in the San Miguel cluster.

Two medal events are scheduled to be contested. The events are: a men's and women's tournament. A total of 64 athletes (32 per gender and 16 teams per event) are scheduled to compete.

== Medal table ==
* Host nation (Peru)

Rank	Nation	Gold	Silver	Bronze	Total
1	Chile	1	0	0	1
1	United States	1	0	0	1
3	Argentina	0	1	1	2
4	Mexico	0	1	0	1
5	Brazil	0	0	1	1
Totals (5 entries)		2	2	2	6

== Medalists ==
Event	Gold	Silver	Bronze
Men's tournament	Chile; Marco Grimalt; Esteban Grimalt	Mexico; Juan Virgen; Rodolfo Ontiveros	Argentina; Nicolás Capogrosso; Julián Azaad
Women's tournament	United States; Karissa Cook; Jace Pardon	Argentina; Ana Gallay; Fernanda Pereyra	Brazil; Carolina Horta; Ângela Lavalle

== Participating nations ==
A total of 19 countries qualified athletes. The number of athletes a nation entered is in parentheses beside the name of the country.

- Argentina (4)
- Brazil (4)
- Canada (4)
- Chile (4)
- Colombia (2)
- Costa Rica (4)
- Cuba (4)
- Dominican Republic (2)
- El Salvador (4)
- Guatemala (4)
- Mexico (4)
- Nicaragua (4)
- Paraguay (2)
- Peru (4)
- Trinidad and Tobago (4)
- United States (4)
- Uruguay (2)
- Venezuela (2)
- Virgin Islands (2)

== Qualification ==
A total of 64 Beach volleyball athletes will qualify to compete. Each nation may enter a maximum of 4 athletes (one team per gender of two athletes). As host nation, Peru automatically qualified a full team of four athletes (one team per gender). All other quotas were awarded through the NORCECA (North America, Central America and Caribbean) and CSV (South America) rankings. The top 10 teams from NORCECA qualified along with the top five teams from CSV.

== See also ==
- Beach volleyball at the 2020 Summer Olympics
