= Beach volleyball at the 2018 South American Games =

- Venue: Estadio Félix Capriles
- Dates: 3 – 7 June
- Nations: 9
- Teams: 15 (men); 13 (women)

== Participating nations ==
=== Men's tournament ===
- Argentina
- Bolivia
- Chile
- Colombia
- Ecuador
- Paraguay
- Peru
- Uruguay
- Venezuela

=== Women's tournament ===
- Argentina
- Bolivia
- Chile
- Colombia
- Ecuador
- Paraguay
- Peru
- Uruguay
- Venezuela

=== Medal summary ===
Event	Gold	Silver	Bronze
Men	Carlos Rangel; José Gómez; Venezuela	Gastón Baldi; Hans Hannibal; Uruguay M 1	Esteban Grimalt; Marco Grimalt; Chile 1
Women	Michelle Valiente; Patricia Caballero; Paraguay	Gabriela Brito; Norisbeth Agudo; Venezuela	Erika Mongelos; Gabriela Filippo; Paraguay 2

=== Medal table ===
Rank	Nation	Gold	Silver	Bronze	Total
1	Venezuela (VEN)	1	1	0	2
2	Paraguay (PAR)	1	0	1	2
3	Uruguay (URU)	0	1	0	1
4	Chile (CHI)	0	0	1	1
Totals (4 entries)		2	2	2	6
