= Volleyball at the 2014 South American Games =

There were two volleyball and two beach volleyball events at the 2014 South American Games.

== Men's beach volleyball ==
=== Pool A ===
Pos	Team	Pld	W	L	Pts	SW	SL	SR	SPW	SPL	SPR
1	Pérez Tapia – Montenegro (Bolivia)	0	0	0	0	0	0	—	0	0	—
2	Williman Antoni – Cathalurda (Uruguay) 2	0	0	0	0	0	0	—	0	0	—
3	Grimalt Fuster – Grimalt (Chile) 1	0	0	0	0	0	0	—	0	0	—
4	Bramont-Arias – Heredia Vasquez (Peru)	0	0	0	0	0	0	—	0	0	—

Date	Time		Score		Set 1	Set 2	Set 3	Total	Report
12 Mar	9:00	Pérez Tapia – Montenegro (Bolivia)	1–2	(Uruguay) 2 Williman Antoni – Cathalurda	21–18	17–21	13–15	51–54	
12 Mar	10:00	Grimalt Fuster – Grimalt (Chile) 1	2–0	(Peru) Bramont-Arias – Heredia Vasquez	21–3	21–9		42–12	
12 Mar	17:00	Grimalt Fuster – Grimalt (Chile) 1	2–0	(Uruguay) 2 Williman Antoni – Cathalurda	21–18	21–12		42–30	
12 Mar	17:00	Pérez Tapia – Montenegro (Bolivia)	1–2	(Peru) Bramont-Arias – Heredia Vasquez	21–9	16–21	10–15	47–45	

== Men's volleyball ==
Pos	Team	Pld	W	L	Pts	SW	SL	SR	SPW	SPL	SPR
1st place, gold medalist(s)	Argentina	3	3	0	6	9	0	MAX	225	117	1.923
2nd place, silver medalist(s)	Chile	3	3	0	6	9	0	MAX	225	148	1.520
3rd place, bronze medalist(s)	Ecuador	4	2	2	6	6	7	0.857	259	295	0.878
4	Peru	3	0	3	3	1	9	0.111	171	240	0.713
5	Colombia	3	0	3	3	0	9	0.000	145	225	0.644

Date	Time		Score		Set 1	Set 2	Set 3	Set 4	Set 5	Total	Report
13 Mar	18:00	Argentina	3–0	Ecuador	25–13	25–15	25–11			75–39	
13 Mar	20:00	Chile	3–0	Peru	25–17	25–15	25–21			75–53	
14 Mar	18:00	Argentina	3–0	Colombia	25–12	25–16	25–11			75–39	
14 Mar	20:00	Chile	3–0	Ecuador	25–17	25–17	25–21			75–55	
15 Mar	18:00	Colombia	0–3	Ecuador	24–26	21–25	21–25			66–76	
15 Mar	20:00	Argentina	3–0	Peru	25–12	25–15	25–12			75–39	
16 Mar	18:00	Ecuador	3–1	Peru	25–21	25–19	15–25	25–14		90–79	
16 Mar	20:00	Colombia	0–3	Chile	12–25	16–25	12–25			40–75	

== Women's volleyball ==
Pos	Team	Pld	W	L	Pts	SW	SL	SR	SPW	SPL	SPR
1st place, gold medalist(s)	Argentina	5	4	1	9	15	3	5.000	409	250	1.636
2nd place, silver medalist(s)	Chile	5	4	1	9	12	4	3.000	378	255	1.482
3rd place, bronze medalist(s)	Brazil	5	4	1	9	13	5	2.600	421	331	1.272
4	Peru	5	2	3	7	6	10	0.600	297	348	0.853
5	Colombia	5	1	4	6	4	12	0.333	272	373	0.729
6	Uruguay	5	0	5	5	0	15	0.000	176	375	0.469

Date	Time		Score		Set 1	Set 2	Set 3	Set 4	Set 5	Total	Report
8 Mar	16:00	Argentina	3–0	Peru	25–12	25–11	25–11			75–34	
8 Mar	18:00	Chile	3–0	Uruguay	25–8	25–7	25–7			75–22	
8 Mar	20:00	Brazil	3–0	Colombia	25–8	25–20	25–13			75–41	
9 Mar	16:00	Argentina	3–0	Uruguay	25–6	25–8	25–10			75–24	
9 Mar	18:00	Chile	3–0	Colombia	25–19	25–7	25–13			75–39	
9 Mar	20:00	Peru	0–3	Brazil	8–25	19–25	18–25			45–75	
10 Mar	16:00	Uruguay	0–3	Colombia	23–25	9–25	19–25			51–75	
10 Mar	18:00	Chile	3–0	Peru	25–19	25–17	25–10			75–46	
10 Mar	20:00	Brazil	3–2	Argentina	20–25	25–22	16–25	25–22	17–15	103–109	
11 Mar	16:00	Brazil	3–0	Uruguay	25–15	25–12	25–11			75–38	
11 Mar	18:00	Argentina	3–0	Chile	25–18	25–17	25–19			75–54	
11 Mar	20:00	Peru	3–1	Colombia	25–16	25–22	22–25	25–19		97–82	
12 Mar	16:00	Uruguay	0–3	Peru	11–25	15–25	15–25			41–75	
12 Mar	18:00	Chile	3–1	Brazil	25–23	23–25	25–21	26–24		99–93	
12 Mar	20:00	Colombia	0–3	Argentina	16–25	9–25	10–25			35–75	
