= Chris Vorpahl =

Chilean volleyball player (born 1990)

Chris Andrea Vorpahl Villablanca

Personal information
- Nationality: Chilean
- Born: 4 October 1990 (age 36)
- Height: 180 cm (71 in)
- Weight: 63 kg (139 lb)
- Spike: 295 cm (116 in)
- Block: 283 cm (111 in)

Volleyball information
- Position: outside hitter
- Number: 10 (national team)

Career
Years	Teams
2011	(Chile) Boston College

National team
2011	Chile

Chris Vorpahl (born 4 October 1990) is a Chilean female beach volleyball player and former indoor volleyball player. She was part of the Chile women's national volleyball team.

She participated at the 2011 Women's Pan-American Volleyball Cup. On club level she played for Boston College in 2011.
