= Beach volleyball at the 2010 South American Games =

- Venue: Plaza Mayor
- Dates: March 25–28

Beach Volleyball at the 2010 South American Games in Medellín was held from March 25 to March 28. All games were played at Plaza Mayor in Medellín, Colombia.

== Medal summary ==
=== Medal table ===
| Rank | Nation | Gold | Silver | Bronze | Total |
|---|---|---|---|---|---|
| 1 | Venezuela (VEN) | 1 | 0 | 1 | 2 |
| 2 | Brazil (BRA) | 1 | 0 | 0 | 1 |
| 3 | Colombia (COL) | 0 | 1 | 0 | 1 |
| 3 | Ecuador (ECU) | 0 | 1 | 0 | 1 |
| 5 | Chile (CHI) | 0 | 0 | 1 | 1 |
| Totals (5 entries) | | 2 | 2 | 2 | 6 |

== Men ==
=== Group stage ===
==== Group A ====
| Team | W | L | Pts |
|---|---|---|---|
| (Ecuador) Bardales/Maldonado | 3 | 0 | 6 |
| (Brazil) Carvalhaes/Gomes | 2 | 1 | 5 |
| (Colombia) Ramirez/Velasquez | 1 | 2 | 4 |
| (Paraguay) Brizuela Car/Godoy Muller | 0 | 3 | 3 |

| Mar 25, 2010 | (Ecuador) Bardales/Maldonado | 2–0 | (Colombia) Ramirez/Velasquez | Plaza Mayor |

| Mar 25, 2010 | (Brazil) Carvalhaes/Gomes | 2–0 | (Paraguay) Brizuela Car/Godoy Muller | Plaza Mayor |

| Mar 25, 2010 | (Brazil) Carvalhaes/Gomes | 2–0 | (Colombia) Ramirez/Velasquez | Plaza Mayor |

| Mar 26, 2010 | (Ecuador) Bardales/Maldonado | 2–0 | (Paraguay) Brizuela Car/Godoy Muller | Plaza Mayor |

| Mar 26, 2010 | (Paraguay) Brizuela Car/Godoy Muller | 1–2 | (Colombia) Ramirez/Velasquez | Plaza Mayor |

| Mar 26, 2010 | (Brazil) Carvalhaes/Gomes | 1–2 | (Ecuador) Bardales/Maldonado | Plaza Mayor |

==== Group B ====
| Team | W | L | Pts |
|---|---|---|---|
| (Uruguay) Cairus/Williman | 2 | 0 | 4 |
| (Argentina) Conde/Del Coto | 1 | 1 | 3 |
| (Bolivia) Barrientos B/Pavisic Ante | 0 | 2 | 2 |

| Mar 25, 2010 | (Uruguay) Cairus/Williman | 2–0 | (Bolivia) Barrientos B/Pavisic Ante | Plaza Mayor |

| Mar 26, 2010 | (Argentina) Conde/Del Coto | 2–0 | (Bolivia) Barrientos B/Pavisic Ante | Plaza Mayor |

| Mar 26, 2010 | (Uruguay) Cairus/Williman | 2–0 | (Argentina) Conde/Del Coto | Plaza Mayor |

==== Group C ====
| Team | W | L | Pts |
|---|---|---|---|
| (Venezuela) Hernandez/Villafane | 3 | 0 | 6 |
| (Chile) Grimalt Fust/Grimalt Krog | 2 | 1 | 5 |
| (Colombia) Cabrera/Cuesta | 1 | 2 | 4 |
| (Peru) Lopez Essenw/Briceno Bell | 0 | 3 | 3 |

| Mar 25, 2010 | (Chile) Grimalt Fust/Grimalt Krog | 2–0 | (Peru) Lopez Essenw/Briceno Bell | Plaza Mayor |

| Mar 25, 2010 | (Colombia) Cabrera/Cuesta | 1–2 | (Venezuela) Hernandez/Villafane | Plaza Mayor |

| Mar 25, 2010 | (Colombia) Ramirez/Velasquez | 2–0 | (Peru) Lopez Essenw/Briceno Bell | Plaza Mayor |

| Mar 26, 2010 | (Chile) Grimalt Fust/Grimalt Krog | 0–2 | (Venezuela) Hernandez/Villafane | Plaza Mayor |

| Mar 26, 2010 | (Venezuela) Hernandez/Villafane | 2–0 | (Peru) Lopez Essenw/Briceno Bell | Plaza Mayor |

| Mar 26, 2010 | (Colombia) Ramirez/Velasquez | 1–2 | (Chile) Grimalt Fust/Grimalt Krog | Plaza Mayor |

=== Quarterfinals ===
| Mar 27, 2010 | (Ecuador) Bardales/Maldonado | 2–0 | (Colombia) Ramirez/Velasquez | Plaza Mayor |

| Mar 27, 2010 | (Uruguay) Cairus/Williman | 0–2 | (Colombia) Cabrera/Cuesta | Plaza Mayor |

| Mar 27, 2010 | (Venezuela) Hernandez/Villafane | 2–0 | (Brazil) Carvalhaes/Gomes | Plaza Mayor |

| Mar 27, 2010 | (Argentina) Conde/Del Coto | 1–2 | (Chile) Grimalt Fust/Grimalt Krog | Plaza Mayor |

=== Semifinals ===
| Mar 28, 2010 | (Venezuela) Hernandez/Villafane | 2–0 | (Colombia) Cabrera/Cuesta | Plaza Mayor |

| Mar 28, 2010 | (Ecuador) Bardales/Maldonado | 2–1 | (Chile) Grimalt Fust/Grimalt Krog | Plaza Mayor |

=== Bronze-medal match ===
| Mar 28, 2010 | (Colombia) Cabrera/Cuesta | 1–2 | (Chile) Grimalt Fust/Grimalt Krog | Plaza Mayor |

=== Gold-medal match ===
| Mar 28, 2010 | (Ecuador) Bardales/Maldonado | 0–2 | (Venezuela) Hernandez/Villafane | Plaza Mayor |

== Women ==
=== Group stage ===
==== Group A ====
| Team | W | L | Pts |
|---|---|---|---|
| (Brazil) Boogaerdt/Schmidt | 2 | 0 | 4 |
| (Ecuador) Chila Angulo/Vilela Becer | 1 | 1 | 3 |
| (Bolivia) Calvo Villar/Coll Vega | 0 | 2 | 2 |

| Mar 25, 2010 | (Brazil) Boogaerdt/Schmidt | 2–0 | (Bolivia) Calvo Villar/Coll Vega | Plaza Mayor |

| Mar 25, 2010 | (Ecuador) Chila Angulo/Vilela Becer | 2–0 | (Bolivia) Calvo Villar/Coll Vega | Plaza Mayor |

| Mar 26, 2010 | (Brazil) Boogaerdt/Schmidt | 2–1 | (Ecuador) Chila Angulo/Vilela Becer | Plaza Mayor |

==== Group B ====
| Team | W | L | Pts |
|---|---|---|---|
| (Venezuela) Mosquera/Valera | 2 | 0 | 4 |
| (Colombia) Medina/Villalobos | 1 | 1 | 3 |
| (Chile) Pina Cerda/Rivas Zapata | 0 | 2 | 2 |

| Mar 25, 2010 | (Colombia) Medina/Villalobos | 0–2 | (Venezuela) Mosquera/Valera | Plaza Mayor |

| Mar 25, 2010 | (Venezuela) Mosquera/Valera | 2–1 | (Chile) Pina Cerda/Rivas Zapata | Plaza Mayor |

| Mar 26, 2010 | (Colombia) Medina/Villalobos | 2–0 | (Chile) Pina Cerda/Rivas Zapata | Plaza Mayor |

==== Group C ====
| Team | W | L | Pts |
|---|---|---|---|
| (Colombia) Galindo/Galindo | 2 | 0 | 4 |
| (Argentina) Albano/Forguez | 1 | 1 | 3 |
| (Uruguay) Cardozo/Guigou | 0 | 2 | 2 |

| Mar 25, 2010 | (Uruguay) Cardozo/Guigou | 0–2 | (Colombia) Galindo/Galindo | Plaza Mayor |

| Mar 26, 2010 | (Argentina) Albano/Forguez | 0–2 | (Colombia) Galindo/Galindo | Plaza Mayor |

| Mar 26, 2010 | (Uruguay) Cardozo/Guigou | 0–2 | (Argentina) Albano/Forguez | Plaza Mayor |

=== Quarterfinals ===
| Mar 27, 2010 | (Brazil) Boogaerdt/Schmidt | 2–0 | (Bolivia) Calvo Villar/Coll Vega | Plaza Mayor |

| Mar 27, 2010 | (Venezuela) Mosquera/Valera | 2–0 | (Chile) Pina Cerda/Rivas Zapata | Plaza Mayor |

| Mar 27, 2010 | (Colombia) Galindo/Galindo | 2–0 | (Ecuador) Chila Angulo/Vilela Becer | Plaza Mayor |

| Mar 27, 2010 | (Colombia) Medina/Villalobos | 1–2 | (Argentina) Albano/Forguez | Plaza Mayor |

=== Semifinals ===
| Mar 28, 2010 | (Venezuela) Mosquera/Valera | 0–2 | (Colombia) Galindo/Galindo | Plaza Mayor |

| Mar 28, 2010 | (Brazil) Boogaerdt/Schmidt | 2–0 | (Argentina) Albano/Forguez | Plaza Mayor |

=== Bronze-medal match ===
| Mar 28, 2010 | (Argentina) Albano/Forguez | 0–2 | (Venezuela) Mosquera/Valera | Plaza Mayor |

=== Gold-medal match ===
| Mar 28, 2010 | (Brazil) Boogaerdt/Schmidt | 2–1 | (Colombia) Galindo/Galindo | Plaza Mayor |
