= 2023 South American Beach Games =

Multi-sport event in Santa Marta, Colombia

- Nations: 15
- Athletes: 800
- Events: 14 sports
- Opening: 14 July 2023
- Closing: 21 July 2023
- Opened by: Astrid Rodríguez; Minister of Sports of Colombia
- Torch lighter: Danobis Dalmero
- Website: santamarta2023.com

The 2023 South American Beach Games (Spanish: Juegos Suramericanos de Playa), officially the V South American Beach Games, is an international multi-sport event that is being held in Santa Marta, Colombia from July 14–21. It will be the first time this event is realised in Colombia. The games are overseen by ODESUR, (acronym for "Organización Deportiva Suramericana" – South American Sports Organization.

== Participating countries ==
All 15 nations of the Organización Deportiva Suramericana (ODESUR) are competing in this edition.

- Argentina (108)
- Aruba (5)
- Bolivia (27)
- Brazil (61)
- Chile (95)
- Colombia (133) (host)
- Curaçao (7)
- Ecuador (82)
- Guyana (TBD)
- Panama (36)
- Paraguay (54)
- Peru (47)
- Suriname (6)
- Uruguay (70)
- Venezuela (92)

== Sports ==
- Beach handball (details)
- Beach rugby (details)
- Beach soccer (details)
- Beach tennis (details)
- Beach volleyball (details)
- Beach wrestling (details)
- Open water swimming (details)
- Rowing beach sprint (details)
- Sailing (details)
- Skateboarding (details)
- Surfing (details)
- Triathlon (details)
- Underwater sports (details)
- Water skiing (details)

== Medal table ==
Final medal tally.

* Host nation (Colombia)

Rank	Nation	Gold	Silver	Bronze	Total
1	Colombia (COL)*	14	15	7	36
2	Venezuela (VEN)	14	8	5	27
3	Brazil (BRA)	11	7	7	25
4	Argentina (ARG)	10	10	16	36
5	Chile (CHI)	8	8	11	27
6	Peru (PER)	5	8	5	18
7	Ecuador (ECU)	4	7	11	22
8	Uruguay (URU)	2	2	3	7
9	Paraguay (PAR)	1	3	0	4
10	Panama (PAN)	0	1	4	5
Totals (10 entries)		69	69	69	207

== Medalists ==
=== Beach rugby ===
Event	Gold	Silver	Bronze
Men	Chile; Franco Buffa; Federico Contreras; Tomas del Rio; Martín Escobar; Martín Leiva; Cristóbal Martínez; Martín Pizarro; Nicolás Saab; Mateo Sahurie; Iñaki Tuset	Colombia; Juan Agudelo; Alex Arrieta; Neider García; Luis Miguel Giraldo; Alejandro Guisao; Camilo Mosquera; Jhojan Ortiz; Jader Quiñones; Juan Camilo Romero; Andrés Telléz	Argentina; Lucio Auad; Simón Benítez Cruz; Guido Chesini; Maximiliano Fiscella Nicoli; Francisco Jorge; Alfonso Latorre; Alejo Lavayén; Tomás Lizazú; Facundo Pueyrredón; Mateo Urani
Women	Colombia; Laura Aguilar; Laura Álvarez; Angela Alzate; Natalia Caycedo; Paola Delgado; Yuriza Martínez; Isabel Ramírez; Yamileth Ramírez; Juliana Soto; Leidy Soto	Chile; Antonieta Badilla; Nataly Badilla; Antonia Paz Campbell; Juaquina Herrera; Camila Igor; Carla Jorquera; Maria Teresa Marin; Jelena Salopek; Catalina Villaroel; Zilera Wyss	Uruguay; Lucia Brum; María Eugenia Cruces; Emilia Loaces; Tatiana Merli; Victoria Merli; Carolina Oliveira; Fiorella Prieto; Estefanía Ren; Mariana Sancristobal; Natalia Verocai

=== Beach tennis ===
Event	Gold	Silver	Bronze
Men's singles	Daniel Mola; Brazil	Diego Guzman; Venezuela	Carlos Vigon; Venezuela
Women's singles	María Emilia Quintana; Ecuador	Francisca Zúñiga; Chile	Sophia Chow; Brazil
Men's doubles	Brazil; Allan Oliveira; André Baran	Venezuela; Carlos Vigon; Ramon Guedez	Chile; Alexander Beller; Vicente Brusadelli-Toro
Women's doubles	Brazil; Sophia Chow; Vitoria Marchezini	Venezuela; Andrea Colavita; Gabriela Anzola	Chile; Cecilia Costa; Francisca Zúñiga
Mixed doubles	Brazil; André Baran; Vitoria Marchezini	Venezuela; Lady Correa; Ramon Guedez	Ecuador; Andrés Cabezas; María Emilia Quintana

=== Beach wrestling ===
Event	Gold	Silver	Bronze
Men's 70 kg	Wilfredo Rodríguez; Venezuela	Julián Horta; Colombia	Sergio Godoy; Ecuador
Men's 80 kg	Steven Rodríguez; Venezuela	Jair Cuero; Colombia	Lautaro Seghesso; Argentina
Men's 90 kg	Pedro Ceballos; Venezuela	Carlos Muñoz; Colombia	Cláudio de Souza; Brazil
Men's +90 kg	José Daniel Díaz; Venezuela	Carlos Angulo; Colombia	Kempton Aparicio; Panama
Women's 50 kg	Naiyeliz Gutierrez; Venezuela	Alisson Cardozo; Colombia	Yusneiry Agrazal; Panama
Women's 60 kg	Betzabeth Argüello; Venezuela	Camila Amarilla; Argentina	Andrea Gonzáles; Colombia
Women's 70 kg	Astrid Montero; Venezuela	Leonela Ayoví; Ecuador	Nicoll Parrado; Colombia
Women's +70 kg	Tatiana Rentería; Colombia	María Acosta; Venezuela	Linda Machuca; Argentina

=== Open water swimming ===
Event	Gold	Silver	Bronze
Men's 5 km	Ronaldo Zambrano; Venezuela	Gian Franco Turco; Argentina	Guillermo Bertola; Argentina
Men's 10 km	Luiz Felipe Loureiro; Brazil	Juan Alcívar; Ecuador	Guillermo Bertola; Argentina
Women's 5 km	Cibelle Jungblut; Brazil	Ana Victoria Abad; Ecuador	Ruthseli Aponte; Venezuela
Women's 10 km	Romina Imwinkelried; Argentina	Mayte Puca; Argentina	Cibelle Jungblut; Brazil
Mixed 4×1500 m relay	Argentina; Gian Franco Turco; Guillermo Bertola; Mayte Puca; Romina Imwinkelried	Colombia; Freddy Arévalo; Juan Castro; Mariana Libreros; Sofia Ospina	Ecuador; Ana Victoria Abad; Danna Martínez; Juan Alcívar; Tommy Guevara

=== Rowing beach sprint ===
Event	Gold	Silver	Bronze
Men's single sculls	Marcos Sarraute; Uruguay	Arturo Rivarola; Paraguay	Johann Hamann; Peru
Women's single sculls	Kimberlyn Meneses; Venezuela	Victoria Hostetter; Chile	Bárbara Ferreira; Brazil
Men's double sculls	Peru; Johann Hamann; Victor Aspillaga	Uruguay; Hugo Vázquez; Marcos Sarraute	Brazil; Herbert Berckenhagen; Vangelys Pereira
Women's double sculls	Chile; Christina Hostetter; Victoria Hostetter	Paraguay; Fiorella Rodríguez; Gabriela Mosqueira	Peru; Daniela Thiermann; María José Cevasco
Mixed double sculls	Chile; Felipe Cárdenas; Victoria Hostetter	Paraguay; Alberto Portillo; Fiorella Rodríguez	Colombia; Andrés Mejía; Zulay Gil

=== Sailing ===
Event	Gold	Silver	Bronze
Men's Ilca 7	Francisco Renna; Argentina	Renzo Sanguineti; Peru	Matías Dyck; Ecuador
Men's Sunfish	Marx Chirinos; Venezuela	Jean Paul de Trazegnies; Peru	Diego González; Chile
Men's Tabla IQFoil	José Gregorio Estredo; Venezuela	Simón Gómez; Colombia	Juan Ignacio Caleau; Argentina
Women's Ilca 6	Daniela Rivera; Venezuela	Sophie Zimmermann; Peru	Isabel Busch; Argentina
Women's Sunfish	Caterina Romero; Peru	María José Poncell; Chile	Sofia D'Agostino; Argentina
Mixed Snipe Abierto	Argentina; Julio Alsogaray; Malena Sciarra	Peru; Alessia Zavala; Ismael Muelle	Uruguay; Mariana Foglia; Pablo Defazio

=== Skateboarding ===
Event	Gold	Silver	Bronze
Men's street	Gabryel Aguilar; Brazil	Eduardo Neves; Brazil	Víctor Urbano; Peru
Women's street	Gabriela Mazetto; Brazil	Carla dos Santos Silva; Brazil	Jazmín Álvarez; Colombia

=== Surfing ===
Event	Gold	Silver	Bronze
Men's bodyboard	Daniel Arocha; Venezuela	Edwin Núñez; Panama	Cristopher Bayona; Peru
Men's shortboard	Israel Junior; Brazil	Alonso Correa; Peru	Isauro Elizondo; Panama
Men's SUP race	Itzel Delgado; Peru	David Leão; Brazil	Santino Basaldella; Argentina
Men's SUP surf	Tamil Martino; Peru	Luiz Diniz; Brazil	Franco Faccin; Argentina
Women's bodyboard	Rosmarky Alvarez; Venezuela	Hannah Saavedra; Peru	Verónica Correa; Panama
Women's shortboard	Lucia Indurain; Argentina	Daniella Rosas; Peru	Mimi Barona; Ecuador
Women's SUP race	Juliana González; Argentina	Lena Ribeiro; Brazil	Giannisa Vecco; Peru
Women's SUP surf	Vania Torres; Peru	Lucía Cosoleto; Argentina	Gabriela Sztamfater; Brazil

=== Triathlon ===
Event	Gold	Silver	Bronze
Men's individual	Juan José Andrade; Ecuador	Mateo Mendoza; Chile	Gabriel Teran; Ecuador
Women's individual	Romina Biagioli; Argentina	Paula Jara; Ecuador	Dominga Jácome; Chile
Men's pair	Ecuador; Gabriel Teran; Juan José Andrade	Chile; Andree Buc; Mateo Mendoza	Argentina; Ivan Anzaldo; Thomás Castañeda
Women's pair	Ecuador; Paula Jara; Paula Vega	Chile; Daniela Moya; Dominga Jácome	Argentina; Moira Miranda; Romina Biagioli
Mixed relay	Chile; Andree Buc; Daniela Moya; Dominga Jácome; Mateo Mendoza	Argentina; Ivan Anzaldo; Moira Miranda; Romina Biagioli; Thomás Castañeda	Brazil; Amanda Moro; Giovanna Lacerda; Matheus Martinhaki; Vinícius Avi Sant'Ana

=== Underwater swimming ===
Event	Gold	Silver	Bronze
Men's 1 km surface monofins	Juan Sebastián Gómez; Colombia	Miguel Rangel; Venezuela	William Birkett; Ecuador
Men's 1 km bi-fins	Tomás Rodríguez; Argentina	Juan David Vivas; Colombia	Miguel Armijos; Ecuador
Men's 3 km bi-fins	Alejandro Hurtado; Colombia	Tomás Rodríguez; Argentina	Erick López; Ecuador
Women's 1 km surface monofins	María Clara Lopera; Colombia	Samanta Díaz; Venezuela	Emma Sabando; Ecuador
Women's 1 km bi-fins	Natalia Sánchez; Colombia	Sammy Diaz; Ecuador	Adriana Rosales; Venezuela
Women's 3 km bi-fins	Laura Saavedra; Colombia	Sammy Diaz; Ecuador	Génesis González; Venezuela
Mixed 4×150 m relay	Colombia; Alejandro Hurtado; Juan Sebastián Gómez; Laura Saavedra; María Clara Lopera	Ecuador; Emma Sabando; Marcelo Mora; Sammy Diaz; William Birkett	Venezuela; Adriana Rosales; Carlos Gregoris; Miguel Rangel; Samanta Díaz
Mixed 4×1 km surface relay	Colombia; Enmanuel Arango; Juan David Vivas; Juana Cortés; Natalia Sánchez	Venezuela; Adriana Rosales; Carlos Gregoris; Miguel Rangel; Samanta Díaz	Chile; Andrés Rojas; Javiera Fuentes; Matías Antiguay; Rocío Torres

=== Water skiing ===
Event	Gold	Silver	Bronze
Men's overall	Martín Verswyvel; Colombia	Erich Gisler; Argentina	Miguel Alemparte; Chile
Men's slalom	Santiago Correa; Colombia	Felipe Neves; Brazil	Juan Luis Piwonka; Chile
Men's jump	José Browne Bezanilla; Chile	Martín Verswyvel; Colombia	Miguel Alemparte; Chile
Men's trick	Tomás Renosto; Argentina	Pablo Alvira; Colombia	Erich Gisler; Argentina
Men's wakeboard	Jorge Rocha; Colombia	Santino Robuschi; Argentina	Vicente Cárcamo; Chile
Women's overall	Daniela Verswyvel; Colombia	Martina Piedrahita; Colombia	Terhi Gisler; Argentina
Women's slalom	Trinidad Espinal; Chile	Emilia Méndez; Chile	Daniela Verswyvel; Colombia
Women's jump	Emilia Méndez; Chile	Martina Piedrahita; Colombia	Emilia Bernal; Colombia
Women's trick	Daniela Verswyvel; Colombia	Martina Piedrahita; Colombia	Delfina Renosto; Argentina
Women's wakeboard	María Victoria De Armas; Argentina	Mariana Osmak; Brazil	Ignacia Holscher; Chile
