= Nicolás Capogrosso =

Argentine beach volleyball player

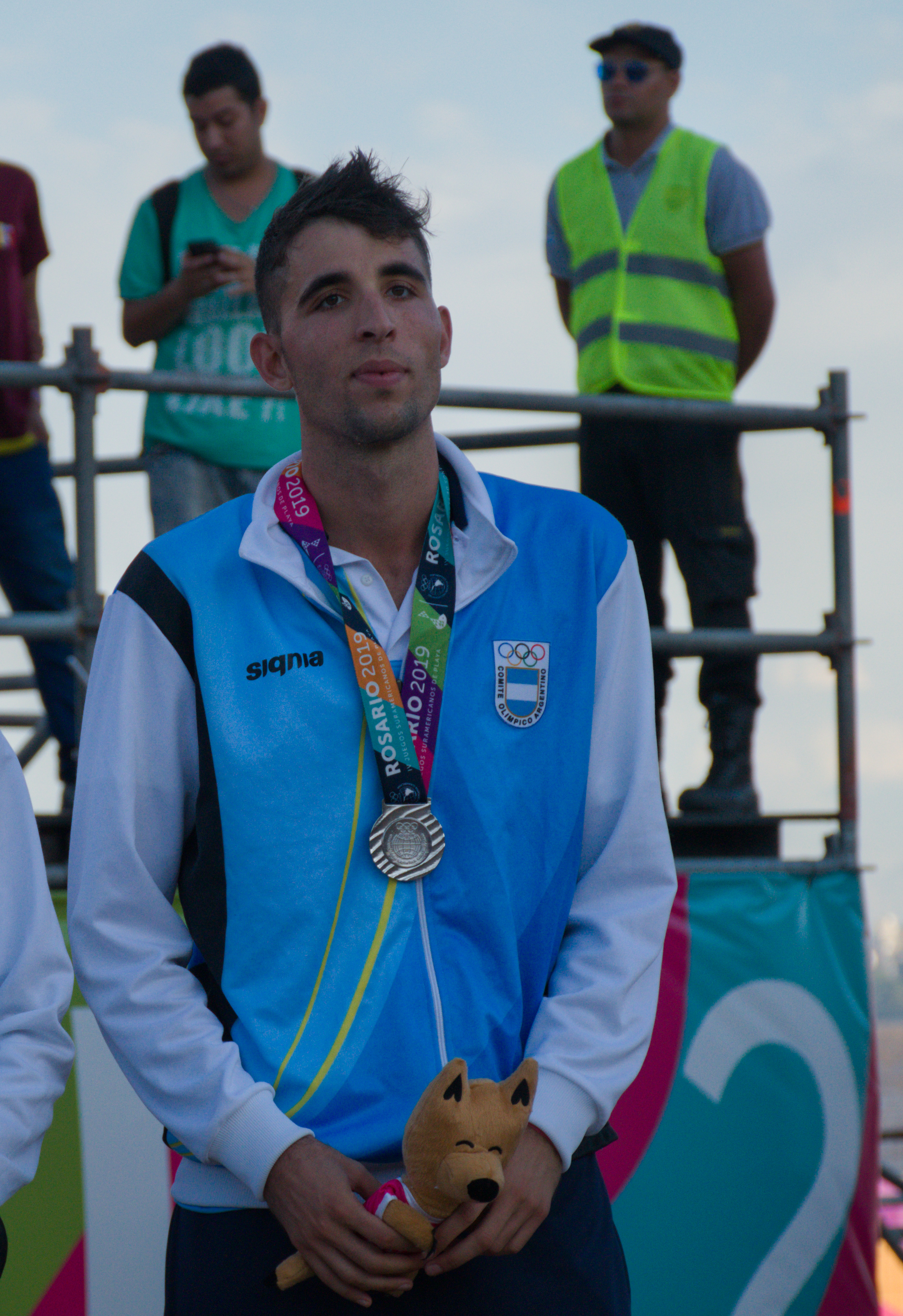
- Capogrosso in 2019

Personal information
- Nationality: Argentina
- Born: 15 January 1995 (age 31) Rosario, Argentina
- Height: 2.05 m (6 ft 9 in)

Sport
- Sport: Beach volleyball
Medal record
Men's beach volleyball
Representing Argentina
Pan American Games
Bronze medal – third place	2019 Lima	Beach
South American Games
Silver medal – second place	2022 Asunción	Beach

Nicolás Capogrosso (born 15 January 1995) is an Argentine beach volleyball player. He competed in the 2020 Summer Olympics.
