= 2013–14 South American Beach Volleyball Circuit (Macae, Brazil) =

2014 South American Beach Volleyball Circuit (Macae Stop)
Tournament details
- Host country: Brazil
- Dates: January 24–26, 2014
- Teams: 16 (each gender)
- Venue: Praia do Pecado (in Macae, Rio de Janeiro host cities)

Final positions
- Champions: Francioni/Carvalhaes (BRA) (male); Horta/Sabino (BRA) (female) (th title)

Macae, Rio de Janeiro, Brazil was the first leg of the 2013–14 South American Beach Volleyball Circuit, the tournament was held March 24–26, 2014.

32 teams participated in the event (16 per gender). Brazil took gold on home soil in both male and female categories, 2013 U21 World Champions Allison Francioni and Gustavo Carvalhaes won for the men while Carolina Horta and Claudinere Sabino took gold in the women's competition.

== Women's Competition ==
=== Participating teams ===
- (Argentina) ARG1 Ana Gallay–Georgina Klug
- (Argentina) ARG2 Virginia Zonta–Julieta Puntin
- (Bolivia) BOL1 Marxia Reyes–Diva Oropeza
- (Bolivia) BOL2 María Rene Jofre–María Rene Vila
- (Brazil) BRA1 Elize Maia–Fernanda Berti
- (Brazil) BRA2 Eduarda Lisboa–Thais Ferreira
- (Brazil) BRA3 Carolina Horta–Claudinere Sabino
- (Brazil) BRA4 Pauline Da Silva–Vanilda Leao
- (Brazil) BRA5 Rachel Nunhes–Camila Fonseca
- (Brazil) BRA6 Andressa Ramalho–Paula Hoffmann
- (Chile) CHI1 Camila Pazdirek–Francesca Rivas
- (Chile) CHI2 Daniela Bravo–Natalia Depassier
- (Paraguay) PAR1 Michelle Valiente–Gabriela Filippo
- (Paraguay) PAR2 Johana Ocampos–Erika Mongelos
- (Uruguay) URU1 Lucía Guigou–Fabiana Gómez
- (Uruguay) URU2 Lia Fortunati–Eugenia Nieto

=== Pools ===
Pool A	Pool B	Pool C	Pool D
(Brazil) BRA1 (Argentina) ARG2 (Chile) CHI2 (Brazil) BRA6	(Brazil) BRA2 (Argentina) ARG1 (Paraguay) PAR2 (Brazil) BRA5	(Brazil) BRA3 (Uruguay) URU2 (Bolivia) BOL1 (Paraguay) PAR1	(Chile) CHI1 (Uruguay) URU1 (Bolivia) BOL2 (Brazil) BRA4

=== Pool A ===
Pos	Team	Pld	W	L	Pts	SW	SL	SR	SPW	SPL	SPR
1	(Brazil) Maia–Berti	3	3	0	6	6	0	MAX	126	75	1.680
2	(Brazil) Ramalho–Hoffmann	3	2	1	5	4	3	1.333	126	126	1.000
3	(Chile) Bravo–Depassier	3	1	2	4	3	4	0.750	116	132	0.879
4	(Argentina) Zonta–Puntin	3	0	3	3	0	6	0.000	98	133	0.737

Date	Time		Score		Set 1	Set 2	Set 3	Total
24 Jan	09:00	Maia–Berti (Brazil)	2–0	(Brazil) Ramalho–Hoffmann	21–10	21–14		42–24
24 Jan	09:00	Zonta–Puntin (Argentina)	0–2	(Chile) Bravo–Depassier	20–22	16–21		36–43
24 Jan	12:00	Maia–Berti (Brazil)	2–0	(Chile) Bravo–Depassier	21–9	21–18		42–27
24 Jan	12:00	Zonta–Puntin (Argentina)	0–2	(Brazil) Ramalho–Hoffmann	13–21	25–27		38–48
25 Jan	09:00	Maia–Berti (Brazil)	2–0	(Argentina) Zonta–Puntin	21–11	21–13		42–24
25 Jan	09:00	Bravo–Depassier (Chile)	1–2	(Brazil) Ramalho–Hoffmann	21–18	14–21	11–15	46–54

=== Pool B ===
Pos	Team	Pld	W	L	Pts	SW	SL	SR	SPW	SPL	SPR
1	(Brazil) Lisboa–Ferreira	3	3	0	6	6	1	6.000	140	95	1.474
2	(Argentina) Gallay–Klug	3	2	1	5	5	2	2.500	131	104	1.260
3	(Brazil) Nunhes–Fonseca	3	1	2	4	2	4	0.500	105	110	0.955
4	(Paraguay) Ocampos–Mongelos	3	0	3	3	0	6	0.000	59	126	0.468

Date	Time		Score		Set 1	Set 2	Set 3	Total
24 Jan	09:40	Lisboa–Ferreira (Brazil)	2–0	(Brazil) Nunhes–Fonseca	21–15	21–14		42–29
24 Jan	09:40	Gallay–Klug (Argentina)	2–0	(Paraguay) Ocampos–Mongelos	21–4	21–10		42–14
24 Jan	12:40	Gallay–Klug (Argentina)	2–0	(Brazil) Nunhes–Fonseca	21–16	21–18		42–34
24 Jan	12:40	Lisboa–Ferreira (Brazil)	2–0	(Paraguay) Ocampos–Mongelos	21–10	21–9		42–19
25 Jan	09:40	Gallay–Klug (Argentina)	1–2	(Brazil) Lisboa–Ferreira	16–21	22–20	9–15	47–56
25 Jan	09:40	Ocampos–Mongelos (Paraguay)	0–2	(Brazil) Nunhes–Fonseca	11–21	15–21		26–42

=== Pool C ===
Pos	Team	Pld	W	L	Pts	SW	SL	SR	SPW	SPL	SPR
1	(Brazil) Horta–Sabino	3	3	0	6	6	0	MAX	126	77	1.636
2	(Paraguay) Valiente–Filippo	3	2	1	5	4	3	1.333	131	121	1.083
3	(Uruguay) Fortunati–Nieto	3	1	2	4	3	4	0.750	126	123	1.024
4	(Bolivia) Reyes–Oropeza	3	0	3	3	0	6	0.000	64	126	0.508

Date	Time		Score		Set 1	Set 2	Set 3	Total
24 Jan	11:00	Valiente–Filippo (Paraguay)	0–2	(Brazil) Horta–Sabino	19–21	16–21		35–42
24 Jan	11:00	Reyes–Oropeza (Bolivia)	0–2	(Uruguay) Fortunati–Nieto	9–21	18–21		27–42
24 Jan	13:40	Valiente–Filippo (Paraguay)	2–1	(Uruguay) Fortunati–Nieto	25–23	13–21	16–14	54–58
24 Jan	13:40	Reyes–Oropeza (Bolivia)	0–2	(Brazil) Horta–Sabino	9–21	7–21		16–42
25 Jan	11:00	Valiente–Filippo (Paraguay)	2–0	(Bolivia) Reyes–Oropeza	21–10	21–11		42–21
25 Jan	11:00	Fortunati–Nieto (Uruguay)	0–2	(Brazil) Horta–Sabino	17–21	9–21		26–42

=== Pool D ===
Pos	Team	Pld	W	L	Pts	SW	SL	SR	SPW	SPL	SPR
1	(Uruguay) Guigou–Gómez	3	3	0	6	6	1	6.000	140	94	1.489
2	(Brazil) Da Silva–Leao	3	2	1	5	5	2	2.500	137	99	1.384
3	(Chile) Pazdirek–Rivas	3	1	2	4	2	4	0.500	104	106	0.981
4	(Bolivia) Jofre–Vila	3	0	3	3	0	6	0.000	44	126	0.349

Date	Time		Score		Set 1	Set 2	Set 3	Total
24 Jan	10:20	Pazdirek–Rivas (Chile)	0–2	(Brazil) Da Silva–Leao	12–21	20–22		32–43
24 Jan	10:20	Guigou–Gómez (Uruguay)	2–0	(Bolivia) Jofre–Vila	21–2	21–10		42–12
24 Jan	13:00	Pazdirek–Rivas (Chile)	2–0	(Bolivia) Jofre–Vila	21–8	21–13		42–21
24 Jan	13:00	Guigou–Gómez (Uruguay)	2–1	(Brazil) Da Silva–Leao	18–21	23–21	15–10	56–52
25 Jan	10:20	Pazdirek–Rivas (Chile)	0–2	(Uruguay) Guigou–Gómez	18–21	12–21		30–42
25 Jan	10:20	Jofre–Vila (Bolivia)	0–2	(Brazil) Da Silva–Leao	3–21	8–21		11–42

=== Championship bracket ===
Quarterfinals
A1	(Brazil) Maia–Berti	2
C2	(Paraguay) Valiente–Filippo	0
D1	(Uruguay) Guigou–Gómez	0
B2	(Argentina) Gallay–Klug	2
B1	(Brazil) Lisboa–Ferreira	2
D2	(Brazil) Da Silva–Leao	0
C1	(Brazil) Horta–Sabino	2
A2	(Brazil) Ramalho–Hoffmann	0

Semifinals
A1	(Brazil) Maia–Berti	2
B2	(Argentina) Gallay–Klug	0
B1	(Brazil) Lisboa–Ferreira	0
C1	(Brazil) Horta–Sabino	2

Finals
A1	(Brazil) Maia–Berti	0
C1	(Brazil) Horta–Sabino	2
Third place
B2	(Argentina) Gallay–Klug	0
B1	(Brazil) Lisboa–Ferreira	2

=== Quarterfinals ===
Date	Time		Score		Set 1	Set 2	Set 3	Total
25 Jan	15:00	Maia–Berti (Brazil)	2–0	(Paraguay) Valiente–Filippo	21–16	21–13		42–29
25 Jan	16:20	Horta–Sabino (Brazil)	2–0	(Brazil) Ramalho–Hoffmann	21–12	21–15		42–27
25 Jan	15:40	Lisboa–Ferreira (Brazil)	2–0	(Brazil) Da Silva–Leao	21–17	21–12		42–29
25 Jan	17:00	Guigou–Gómez (Uruguay)	0–2	(Argentina) Gallay–Klug	17–21	7–21		24–42

=== Semifinals ===
Date	Time		Score		Set 1	Set 2	Set 3	Total
26 Jan	9:00	Horta–Sabino (Brazil)	2–0	(Brazil) Lisboa–Ferreira	21–18	21–14		42–32
26 Jan	9:00	Maia–Berti (Brazil)	2–0	(Argentina) Gallay–Klug	21–8	21–17		42–25

=== Third-place match ===
Date	Time		Score		Set 1	Set 2	Set 3	Total
26 Jan	9:00	Lisboa–Ferreira (Brazil)	2–0	(Argentina) Gallay–Klug	21–19	21–17		42–36

=== Final ===
Date	Time		Score		Set 1	Set 2	Set 3	Total
26 Jan	9:00	Maia–Berti (Brazil)	0–2	(Brazil) Horta–Sabino	18–21	19–21		37–42

=== Ranking ===
Rank	Final Ranking	Points
1st place, gold medalist(s)	(Brazil) Horta–Sabino	200
2nd place, silver medalist(s)	(Brazil) Maia–Berti	-
3rd place, bronze medalist(s)	(Brazil) Lisboa–Ferreira	-
4.	(Argentina) Gallay–Klug	140
5.	(Brazil) Ramalho–Hoffmann	-
5.	(Brazil) Da Silva–Leao	-
5.	(Paraguay) Valiente–Filippo	120
5.	(Uruguay) Guigou–Gómez	120
9.	(Brazil) Nunhes–Fonseca	-
9.	(Chile) Bravo–Depassier	100
9.	(Chile) Pazdirek–Rivas	-
9.	(Uruguay) Fortunati–Nieto	-
13.	(Argentina) Zonta–Puntin	-
13.	(Bolivia) Reyes–Oropeza	100
13.	(Bolivia) Jofre–Vila	-
13.	(Paraguay) Ocampos–Mongelos	-

== Men's Competition ==
=== Participating teams ===
- (Argentina) ARG1 Julian Azaad–Ian Mehamed
- (Argentina) ARG2 Facundo Del Coto–Pablo Bianchi
- (Bolivia) BOL1 Fernando Barrientos–Juan Pablo Naim
- (Bolivia) BOL2 Israel Martínez–Sergio Franco
- (Brazil) BRA1 Alvaro Filho–Edson de Barros
- (Brazil) BRA2 Oscar Brandao–Thiago Barbosa
- (Brazil) BRA3 Bruno Lima–Heriberto Lima
- (Brazil) BRA4 Allison Francioni–Gustavo Carvalhaes
- (Brazil) BRA5 Saymon Barbosa–Marcio Gaudie Ley
- (Brazil) BRA6 Joallison Gomez–Hevaldo Sabino
- (Chile) CHI1 Esteban Grimalt–Marco Grimalt
- (Chile) CHI2 Cristobal Martínez–Rodrigo Salinas
- (Paraguay) PAR1 Luis Riveros–Mauricio Brizuela
- (Paraguay) PAR2 Roger Battilana–Gregorio Godoy
- (Uruguay) URU1 Renzo Cairus–Nicolás Zanotta
- (Uruguay) URU2 Guillermo Williman–Pablo Rodríguez

=== Pools ===
Pool A	Pool B	Pool C	Pool D
(Brazil) BRA1 (Argentina) ARG2 (Chile) CHI2 (Brazil) BRA6	(Brazil) BRA2 (Chile) CHI1 (Paraguay) PAR2 (Brazil) BRA5	(Brazil) BRA3 (Uruguay) URU1 (Paraguay) PAR1 (Bolivia) BOL2	(Brazil) BRA4 (Argentina) ARG1 (Bolivia) BOL1 (Uruguay) URU2

=== Pool A ===
Pos	Team	Pld	W	L	Pts	SW	SL	SR	SPW	SPL	SPR
1	(Brazil) Gomez–Sabino	3	3	0	6	6	1	6.000	140	117	1.197
2	(Argentina) Del Coto–Bianchi	3	2	1	5	5	3	1.667	141	140	1.007
3	(Chile) Martínez–Salinas	3	1	2	4	3	4	0.750	121	129	0.938
4	(Brazil) Filho–Barros	3	0	3	3	0	6	0.000	113	129	0.876

Date	Time		Score		Set 1	Set 2	Set 3	Total
24 Jan	09:00	Filho–Barros (Brazil)	0–2	(Brazil) Gomez–Sabino	19–21	17–21		36–42
24 Jan	09:00	Del Coto–Bianchi (Argentina)	2–1	(Chile) Martínez–Salinas	21–16	11–21	15–10	47–47
24 Jan	11:40	Filho–Barros (Brazil)	0–2	(Argentina) Del Coto–Bianchi	20–22	17–22		37–43
24 Jan	11:40	Martínez–Salinas (Chile)	0–2	(Brazil) Gomez–Sabino	12–21	18–21		30–42
25 Jan	09:00	Filho–Barros (Brazil)	0–2	(Chile) Martínez–Salinas	19–21	21–23		40–44
25 Jan	09:00	Del Coto–Bianchi (Argentina)	1–2	(Brazil) Gomez–Sabino	22–20	17–21	12–15	51–56

=== Pool B ===
Pos	Team	Pld	W	L	Pts	SW	SL	SR	SPW	SPL	SPR
1	(Brazil) Barbosa–Gaudie Ley	3	2	1	5	4	2	2.000	116	85	1.365
2	(Chile) Grimalt–Grimalt	3	2	1	5	4	2	2.000	117	89	1.315
3	(Brazil) Brandao–Barbosa	3	2	1	5	4	2	2.000	121	101	1.198
4	(Paraguay) Battilana–Godoy	3	0	3	3	0	6	0.000	37	126	0.294

Date	Time		Score		Set 1	Set 2	Set 3	Total
24 Jan	09:40	Brandao–Barbosa (Brazil)	2–0	(Brazil) Barbosa–Gaudie Ley	21–16	21–16		42–32
24 Jan	09:40	Grimalt–Grimalt (Chile)	2–0	(Paraguay) Battilana–Godoy	21–4	21–6		42–10
24 Jan	12:20	Grimalt–Grimalt (Chile)	0–2	(Brazil) Barbosa–Gaudie Ley	14–21	19–21		33–42
24 Jan	12:20	Brandao–Barbosa (Brazil)	2–0	(Paraguay) Battilana–Godoy	21–15	21–12		42–27
25 Jan	09:40	Grimalt–Grimalt (Chile)	2–0	(Brazil) Brandao–Barbosa	21–18	21–19		42–37
25 Jan	09:40	Barbosa–Gaudie Ley (Brazil)	2–0	(Paraguay) Battilana–Godoy	21–2	21–8		42–10

=== Pool C ===
Pos	Team	Pld	W	L	Pts	SW	SL	SR	SPW	SPL	SPR
1	(Brazil) Francioni–Carvalhaes	3	3	0	6	6	0	MAX	127	83	1.530
2	(Argentina) Azaad–Mehamed	3	2	1	5	4	2	2.000	118	85	1.388
3	(Uruguay) Williman–Rodríguez	3	1	2	4	2	4	0.500	106	115	0.922
4	(Bolivia) Barrientos–Naim	3	0	3	3	0	6	0.000	58	126	0.460

Date	Time		Score		Set 1	Set 2	Set 3	Total
24 Jan	10:20	Azaad–Mehamed (Argentina)	0–2	(Brazil) Francioni–Carvalhaes	17–21	17–21		34–42
24 Jan	10:20	Williman–Rodríguez (Uruguay)	2–0	(Bolivia) Barrientos–Naim	21–12	21–18		42–30
24 Jan	13:00	Azaad–Mehamed (Argentina)	2–0	(Uruguay) Williman–Rodríguez	21–16	21–16		42–32
24 Jan	13:00	Barrientos–Naim (Bolivia)	0–2	(Brazil) Francioni–Carvalhaes	6–21	11–21		17–42
25 Jan	10:20	Azaad–Mehamed (Argentina)	2–0	(Bolivia) Barrientos–Naim	21–5	21–6		42–11
25 Jan	10:20	Francioni–Carvalhaes (Brazil)	2–0	(Uruguay) Williman–Rodríguez	21–12	22–20		43–32

=== Pool D ===
Pos	Team	Pld	W	L	Pts	SW	SL	SR	SPW	SPL	SPR
1	(Brazil) Lima–Lima	3	3	0	6	6	0	MAX	126	81	1.556
2	(Uruguay) Cairus–Zanotta	3	2	1	5	4	2	2.000	114	95	1.200
3	(Paraguay) Riveros–Brizuela	3	1	2	4	2	4	0.500	113	114	0.991
4	(Bolivia) Martínez–Franco	3	0	3	3	0	6	0.000	73	126	0.579

Date	Time		Score		Set 1	Set 2	Set 3	Total
24 Jan	11:00	Lima–Lima (Brazil)	2–0	(Paraguay) Riveros–Brizuela	21–12	21–14		42–26
24 Jan	11:00	Cairus–Zanotta (Uruguay)	2–0	(Bolivia) Martínez–Franco	21–12	21–6		42–18
24 Jan	13:40	Martínez–Franco (Bolivia)	0–2	(Paraguay) Riveros–Brizuela	15–21	15–21		30–42
24 Jan	13:40	Lima–Lima (Brazil)	2–0	(Uruguay) Cairus–Zanotta	21–17	21–13		42–30
25 Jan	11:00	Cairus–Zanotta (Uruguay)	2–0	(Paraguay) Riveros–Brizuela	21–16	21–19		42–35
25 Jan	11:00	Lima–Lima (Brazil)	2–0	(Bolivia) Martínez–Franco	21–14	21–11		42–25

=== Championship bracket ===
Quarterfinals
A1	(Brazil) Gomez–Sabino	2
D2	(Uruguay) Cairus–Zanotta	0
C1	(Brazil) Francioni–Carvalhaes	2
B2	(Chile) Grimalt–Grimalt	0
B1	(Brazil) Barbosa–Gaudie Ley	0
C2	(Argentina) Azaad–Mehamed	0
D1	(Brazil) Lima–Lima	0
A2	(Argentina) Del Coto–Bianchi	2

Semifinals
A1	(Brazil) Gomez–Sabino	0
C1	(Brazil) Francioni–Carvalhaes	2
C2	(Argentina) Azaad–Mehamed	1
A2	(Argentina) Del Coto–Bianchi	2

Finals
C1	(Brazil) Francioni–Carvalhaes	2
A2	(Argentina) Del Coto–Bianchi	0
Third place
A1	(Brazil) Gomez–Sabino	0
C1	(Argentina) Azaad–Mehamed	2

=== Quarterfinals ===
Date	Time		Score		Set 1	Set 2	Set 3	Total
25 Jan	15:00	Gomez–Sabino (Brazil)	2–0	(Uruguay) Cairus–Zanotta	21–17	21–19		42–36
25 Jan	15:40	Lima–Lima (Brazil)	0–2	(Argentina) Del Coto–Bianchi	17–21	15–21		32–42
25 Jan	16:20	Barbosa–Gaudie Ley (Brazil)	0–2	(Argentina) Azaad–Mehamed	18–21	21–23		39–44
25 Jan	17:00	Francioni–Carvalhaes (Brazil)	2–0	(Chile) Grimalt–Grimalt	21–0	21–0		42–0

=== Semifinals ===
Date	Time		Score		Set 1	Set 2	Set 3	Total
26 Jan	10:00	Azaad–Mehamed (Argentina)	1–2	(Argentina) Del Coto–Bianchi	21–17	15–21	9–15	45–53
26 Jan	11:00	Gomez–Sabino (Brazil)	0–2	(Brazil) Francioni–Carvalhaes	17–21	7–21		24–42

=== Third-place match ===
Date	Time		Score		Set 1	Set 2	Set 3	Total
26 Jan	13:00	Azaad–Mehamed (Argentina)	2–0	(Brazil) Gomez–Sabino	21–0	21–0		42–0

=== Final ===
Date	Time		Score		Set 1	Set 2	Set 3	Total
26 Jan	14:00	Francioni–Carvalhaes (Brazil)	2–0	(Argentina) Del Coto–Bianchi	22–20	21–16		43–36

=== Ranking ===
Rank	Final Ranking	Points
1st place, gold medalist(s)	(Brazil) Francioni–Carvalhaes	200
2nd place, silver medalist(s)	(Argentina) Del Coto–Bianchi	180
3rd place, bronze medalist(s)	(Argentina) Azaad–Mehamed	-
4.	(Brazil) Gomez–Sabino	-
5.	(Brazil) Barbosa–Gaudie Ley	-
5.	(Brazil) Lima–Lima	-
5.	(Chile) Grimalt–Grimalt	120
5.	(Uruguay) Cairus–Zanotta	120
9.	(Brazil) Brandao–Barbosa	-
9.	(Chile) Martínez–Salinas	-
9.	(Paraguay) Riveros–Brizuela	100
9.	(Uruguay) Williman–Rodríguez	-
13.	(Brazil) Filho–Barros	-
13.	(Bolivia) Barrientos–Naim	100
13.	(Bolivia) Martínez–Franco	-
13.	(Paraguay) Battilana–Godoy	-

== Ranking after first stop ==
=== Women ===
Rank	Final Ranking	Points
1.	Brazil	200
2.	Argentina	140
3.	Paraguay	120
3.	Uruguay	120
5.	Bolivia	100
5.	Chile	100

=== Men ===
Rank	Final Ranking	Points
1.	Brazil	200
2.	Argentina	180
3.	Chile	120
3.	Uruguay	120
5.	Bolivia	100
5.	Paraguay	100
