= 2013–14 South American Beach Volleyball Circuit (Viña del Mar, Chile) =

2014 South American Beach Volleyball Circuit (Viña del Mar Stop)
Tournament details
- Host country: Chile
- Dates: February 7–9, 2014
- Teams: 16 (each gender)
- Venue: Viña (in Viña del Mar host cities)

Final positions
- Champions: Azaad/Mehamed (ARG) (male) (1st title); Gallay/Klug (ARG) (female) (1st title)

Viña del Mar, Chile was the second leg of the 2013–14 South American Beach Volleyball Circuit, the tournament was held February 7–9, 2014.

32 teams participated in the event (16 per gender). Argentina took gold in both male and female categories, for the men, Julian Azaad and Ian Mehamed won their first South American title while 2012 Olympian Ana Gallay and Georgina Klug took gold in the women's competition.

== Women's Competition ==
=== Participating teams ===
- (Argentina) ARG1 Ana Gallay–Georgina Klug
- (Argentina) ARG2 Julieta Puntin–Cecilia Peralta
- (Bolivia) BOL Marxia Reyes–Diva Oropeza
- (Brazil) BRA1 Thais Ferreira–Fabiola Constancio
- (Brazil) BRA2 Karine Monte–Rafaela Fares
- (Chile) CHI1 Camila Pazdirek–Francesca Rivas
- (Chile) CHI2 Pilar Mardones–Saniela Burgos
- (Chile) CHI3 María Elena Salas–Josefina Vélez
- (Colombia) COL Andrea Galindo–Claudia Galindo
- (Paraguay) PAR Michelle Valiente–Gabriela Filippo
- (Peru) PER1 Mishell Serna–Alinson Vela
- (Peru) PER2 Katia García–Michelle Mogollon
- (Uruguay) URU1 Lucía Guigou–Eugenia Nieto
- (Uruguay) URU2 Lia Fortunati–Victoria Aguirre
- (Venezuela) VEN1 Norisbeth Agudo–Gabriela Brito
- (Venezuela) VEN2 Yetsi Lezama–Milagros Hernández

=== Pools ===
| Pool A | Pool B | Pool C | Pool D |
|---|---|---|---|
| (Brazil) BRA1 (Colombia) COL (Peru) PER1 (Chile) CHI3 | (Brazil) BRA2 (Argentina) ARG1 (Peru) PER2 (Venezuela) VEN1 | (Chile) CHI1 (Paraguay) PAR (Argentina) ARG2 (Venezuela) VEN2 | (Chile) CHI2 (Uruguay) URU1 (Uruguay) URU2 (Bolivia) BOL |

=== Pool A ===
| Pos | Team | Pld | W | L | Pts | SW | SL | SR | SPW | SPL | SPR |
|---|---|---|---|---|---|---|---|---|---|---|---|
| 1 | (Brazil) Ferreira–Constancio | 3 | 3 | 0 | 6 | 6 | 0 | MAX | 126 | 74 | 1.703 |
| 2 | (Colombia) Galindo–Galindo | 3 | 2 | 1 | 5 | 4 | 2 | 2.000 | 112 | 82 | 1.366 |
| 3 | (Chile) Salas–Vélez | 3 | 1 | 2 | 4 | 2 | 4 | 0.500 | 89 | 120 | 0.742 |
| 4 | (Peru) Serna–Vela | 3 | 0 | 3 | 3 | 0 | 6 | 0.000 | 75 | 126 | 0.595 |

| Date | Time | | Score | | Set 1 | Set 2 | Set 3 | Total |
|---|---|---|---|---|---|---|---|---|
| 7 Feb | 09:00 | Ferreira–Constancio (Brazil) | 2–0 | (Chile) Salas–Vélez | 21–10 | 21–18 | | 42–28 |
| 7 Feb | 09:00 | Galindo–Galindo (Colombia) | 2–0 | (Peru) Serna–Vela | 21–6 | 21–15 | | 42–21 |
| 7 Feb | 11:00 | Ferreira–Constancio (Brazil) | 2–0 | (Colombia) Galindo–Galindo | 21–14 | 21–14 | | 42–28 |
| 7 Feb | 11:00 | Serna–Vela (Peru) | 0–2 | (Chile) Salas–Vélez | 17–21 | 19–21 | | 36–42 |
| 8 Feb | 09:00 | Ferreira–Constancio (Brazil) | 2–0 | (Peru) Serna–Vela | 21–9 | 21–9 | | 42–18 |
| 8 Feb | 09:00 | Salas–Vélez (Chile) | 0–2 | (Colombia) Galindo–Galindo | 5–21 | 12–21 | | 19–42 |

=== Pool B ===
| Pos | Team | Pld | W | L | Pts | SW | SL | SR | SPW | SPL | SPR |
|---|---|---|---|---|---|---|---|---|---|---|---|
| 1 | (Argentina) Gallay–Klug | 3 | 3 | 0 | 6 | 6 | 0 | MAX | 126 | 84 | 1.500 |
| 2 | (Venezuela) Agudo–Brito | 3 | 2 | 1 | 5 | 4 | 3 | 1.333 | 120 | 104 | 1.154 |
| 3 | (Brazil) Monte–Fares | 3 | 1 | 2 | 4 | 3 | 4 | 0.750 | 121 | 117 | 1.034 |
| 4 | (Peru) García–Mogollon | 3 | 0 | 3 | 3 | 0 | 6 | 0.000 | 64 | 126 | 0.508 |

| Date | Time | | Score | | Set 1 | Set 2 | Set 3 | Total |
|---|---|---|---|---|---|---|---|---|
| 7 Feb | 09:40 | Gallay–Klug (Argentina) | 2–0 | (Peru) García–Mogollon | 21–17 | 21–11 | | 42–28 |
| 7 Feb | 09:40 | Monte–Fares (Brazil) | 1–2 | (Venezuela) Agudo–Brito | 16–21 | 22–20 | 7–15 | 45–46 |
| 7 Feb | 11:40 | Gallay–Klug (Argentina) | 2–0 | (Brazil) Monte–Fares | 21–11 | 21–14 | | 42–25 |
| 7 Feb | 12:20 | Agudo–Brito (Venezuela) | 2–0 | (Peru) García–Mogollon | 21–9 | 21–13 | | 42–22 |
| 8 Feb | 09:40 | Gallay–Klug (Argentina) | 2–0 | (Venezuela) Agudo–Brito | 21–17 | 21–14 | | 42–31 |
| 8 Feb | 09:40 | Monte–Fares (Brazil) | 2–0 | (Peru) García–Mogollon | 21–6 | 21–8 | | 42–14 |

=== Pool C ===
| Pos | Team | Pld | W | L | Pts | SW | SL | SR | SPW | SPL | SPR |
|---|---|---|---|---|---|---|---|---|---|---|---|
| 1 | (Chile) Pazdirek–Rivas | 3 | 3 | 0 | 6 | 6 | 1 | 6.000 | 138 | 95 | 1.453 |
| 2 | (Venezuela) Lezama–Hernández | 3 | 2 | 1 | 5 | 4 | 3 | 1.333 | 128 | 118 | 1.085 |
| 3 | (Paraguay) Valiente–Filippo | 3 | 1 | 2 | 4 | 4 | 4 | 1.000 | 141 | 128 | 1.102 |
| 4 | (Argentina) Puntin–Peralta | 3 | 0 | 3 | 3 | 0 | 6 | 0.000 | 73 | 126 | 0.579 |

| Date | Time | | Score | | Set 1 | Set 2 | Set 3 | Total |
|---|---|---|---|---|---|---|---|---|
| 7 Feb | 10:20 | Valiente–Filippo (Paraguay) | 1–2 | (Venezuela) Lezama–Hernández | 11–21 | 21–17 | 13–15 | 45–53 |
| 7 Feb | 10:20 | Pazdirek–Rivas (Chile) | 2–0 | (Argentina) Puntin–Peralta | 21–10 | 21–10 | | 42–20 |
| 7 Feb | 12:20 | Valiente–Filippo (Paraguay) | 2–0 | (Argentina) Puntin–Peralta | 21–10 | 21–12 | | 42–22 |
| 7 Feb | 12:20 | Pazdirek–Rivas (Chile) | 2–0 | (Venezuela) Lezama–Hernández | 21–16 | 21–17 | | 42–33 |
| 8 Feb | 10:20 | Pazdirek–Rivas (Chile) | 2–1 | (Paraguay) Valiente–Filippo | 21–9 | 18–21 | 15–12 | 54–42 |
| 8 Feb | 10:20 | Puntin–Peralta (Argentina) | 0–2 | (Venezuela) Lezama–Hernández | 17–21 | 14–21 | | 31–42 |

=== Pool D ===
| Pos | Team | Pld | W | L | Pts | SW | SL | SR | SPW | SPL | SPR |
|---|---|---|---|---|---|---|---|---|---|---|---|
| 1 | (Uruguay) Guigou–Nieto | 3 | 3 | 0 | 6 | 6 | 0 | MAX | 126 | 80 | 1.575 |
| 2 | (Uruguay) Fortunati–Aguirre | 3 | 2 | 1 | 5 | 4 | 3 | 1.333 | 120 | 122 | 0.984 |
| 3 | (Chile) Mardones–Burgos | 3 | 1 | 2 | 4 | 3 | 4 | 0.750 | 124 | 113 | 1.097 |
| 4 | (Bolivia) Reyes–Oropeza | 3 | 0 | 3 | 3 | 0 | 6 | 0.000 | 71 | 126 | 0.563 |

| Date | Time | | Score | | Set 1 | Set 2 | Set 3 | Total |
|---|---|---|---|---|---|---|---|---|
| 7 Feb | 11:00 | Guigou–Nieto (Uruguay) | 2–0 | (Uruguay) Fortunati–Aguirre | 21–13 | 21–14 | | 42–27 |
| 7 Feb | 11:00 | Mardones–Burgos (Chile) | 2–0 | (Bolivia) Reyes–Oropeza | 21–10 | 21–10 | | 42–20 |
| 7 Feb | 13:20 | Reyes–Oropeza (Bolivia) | 0–2 | (Uruguay) Fortunati–Aguirre | 14–21 | 13–21 | | 27–42 |
| 7 Feb | 13:20 | Mardones–Burgos (Chile) | 0–2 | (Uruguay) Guigou–Nieto | 16–21 | 13–21 | | 29–42 |
| 8 Feb | 11:00 | Guigou–Nieto (Uruguay) | 2–0 | (Bolivia) Reyes–Oropeza | 21–10 | 21–14 | | 42–24 |
| 8 Feb | 11:00 | Mardones–Burgos (Chile) | 1–2 | (Uruguay) Fortunati–Aguirre | 21–15 | 19–21 | 13–15 | 53–51 |

=== Championship bracket ===
Quarterfinals
A1 | (Brazil) Ferreira–Constancio | 2
D2 | (Uruguay) Fortunati–Aguirre | 0
C1 | (Chile) Pazdirek–Rivas | 1
B2 | (Venezuela) Agudo–Brito | 2
B1 | (Argentina) Gallay–Klug | 2
C2 | (Venezuela) Lezama–Hernández | 0
D1 | (Uruguay) Guigou–Nieto | 2
A2 | (Colombia) Galindo–Galindo | 1

Semifinals
A1 | (Brazil) Ferreira–Constancio | 2
B2 | (Venezuela) Agudo–Brito | 0
B1 | (Argentina) Gallay–Klug | 2
D1 | (Uruguay) Guigou–Nieto | 0

Finals
A1 | (Brazil) Ferreira–Constancio | 1
B1 | (Argentina) Gallay–Klug | 2
Third place
B2 | (Venezuela) Agudo–Brito | 2
D1 | (Uruguay) Guigou–Nieto | 0

=== Quarterfinals ===
| Date | Time | | Score | | Set 1 | Set 2 | Set 3 | Total |
|---|---|---|---|---|---|---|---|---|
| 8 Feb | 15:00 | Ferreira–Constancio (Brazil) | 2–0 | (Uruguay) Fortunati–Aguirre | 21–9 | 21–7 | | 42–16 |
| 8 Feb | 15:40 | Guigou–Nieto (Uruguay) | 2–1 | (Colombia) Galindo–Galindo | 19–21 | 21–19 | 15–11 | 55–51 |
| 8 Feb | 16:20 | Gallay–Klug (Argentina) | 2–0 | (Venezuela) Lezama–Hernández | 21–12 | 21–16 | | 42–28 |
| 8 Feb | 17:00 | Pazdirek–Rivas (Chile) | 1–2 | (Venezuela) Agudo–Brito | 16–21 | 21–19 | 10–15 | 47–55 |

=== Semifinals ===
| Date | Time | | Score | | Set 1 | Set 2 | Set 3 | Total |
|---|---|---|---|---|---|---|---|---|
| 8 Feb | 16:20 | Gallay–Klug (Argentina) | 2–0 | (Uruguay) Guigou–Nieto | 21–12 | 21–12 | | 42–24 |
| 8 Feb | 15:00 | Ferreira–Constancio (Brazil) | 2–0 | (Venezuela) Agudo–Brito | 21–14 | 21–16 | | 42–30 |

=== Third-place match ===
| Date | Time | | Score | | Set 1 | Set 2 | Set 3 | Total |
|---|---|---|---|---|---|---|---|---|
| 8 Feb | 16:20 | Agudo–Brito (Venezuela) | 2–0 | (Uruguay) Guigou–Nieto | 21–16 | 21–17 | | 42–33 |

=== Final ===
| Date | Time | | Score | | Set 1 | Set 2 | Set 3 | Total |
|---|---|---|---|---|---|---|---|---|
| 8 Feb | 16:20 | Gallay–Klug (Argentina) | 2–1 | (Brazil) Ferreira–Constancio | 21–18 | 14–21 | 15–7 | 50–46 |

=== Ranking ===
| Rank | Final ranking | Points |
|---|---|---|
| 1st place, gold medalist(s) | (Argentina) Gallay–Klug | 200 |
| 2nd place, silver medalist(s) | (Brazil) Ferreira–Constancio | 180 |
| 3rd place, bronze medalist(s) | (Venezuela) Agudo–Brito | 160 |
| 4. | (Uruguay) Guigou–Nieto | 140 |
| 5. | (Chile) Pazdirek–Rivas | 120 |
| 5. | (Colombia) Galindo–Galindo | 120 |
| 5. | (Uruguay) Fortunati–Aguirre | - |
| 5. | (Venezuela) Lezama–Hernández | - |
| 9. | (Brazil) Monte–Fares | - |
| 9. | (Chile) Salas–Vélez | - |
| 9. | (Chile) Mardones–Burgos | - |
| 9. | (Paraguay) Valiente–Filippo | 100 |
| 13. | (Argentina) Puntin–Peralta | - |
| 13. | (Bolivia) Reyes–Oropeza | 100 |
| 13. | (Peru) Serna–Vela | 100 |
| 13. | (Peru) García–Mogollon | - |

== Men's Competition ==
=== Participating teams ===
- (Argentina) ARG1 Julian Azaad–Ian Mehamed
- (Argentina) ARG2 Facundo del Coto–Pablo Bianchi
- (Bolivia) BOL Israel Martínez–Sergio Franco
- (Brazil) BRA1 Allison Francioni–Gustavo Carvalhaes
- (Brazil) BRA2 Marcio Gaudie Ley–Saymon Barbosa
- (Chile) CHI1 Esteban Grimalt–Marco Grimalt
- (Chile) CHI2 Cristobal Martínez–Rodrigo Salinas
- (Chile) CHI3 Javier Daga–Matias Tovar
- (Colombia) COL Yhan Cuesta–Diego Corredor
- (Paraguay) PAR Luis Riveros–Mauricio Brizuela
- (Peru) PER1 Williams Maldonado–Roger Rengifo
- (Peru) PER2 Luis Bramont–Jimy Heredia
- (Uruguay) URU1 Renzo Cairus–Nicolás Zanotta
- (Uruguay) URU2 Andrés Stoll–Martín Molina
- (Venezuela) VEN1 Jesús Villafañe–Igor Hernández
- (Venezuela) VEN2 Jackson Henríquez–Carlos Rangel

=== Pools ===
| Pool A | Pool B | Pool C | Pool D |
|---|---|---|---|
| (Brazil) BRA1 (Venezuela) VEN1 (Peru) PER1 (Chile) CHI3 | (Brazil) BRA2 (Argentina) ARG2 (Colombia) COL (Venezuela) VEN2 | (Chile) CHI1 (Argentina) ARG1 (Paraguay) PAR (Peru) PER2 | (Chile) CHI2 (Uruguay) URU1 (Uruguay) URU2 (Bolivia) BOL |

=== Pool A ===
| Pos | Team | Pld | W | L | Pts | SW | SL | SR | SPW | SPL | SPR |
|---|---|---|---|---|---|---|---|---|---|---|---|
| 1 | (Brazil) Francioni–Carvalhaes | 3 | 2 | 1 | 5 | 5 | 2 | 2.500 | 138 | 110 | 1.255 |
| 2 | (Venezuela) Villafañe–Hernández | 3 | 2 | 1 | 5 | 4 | 2 | 2.000 | 122 | 87 | 1.402 |
| 3 | (Chile) Daga–Tovar | 3 | 2 | 1 | 5 | 4 | 3 | 1.333 | 113 | 127 | 0.890 |
| 4 | (Peru) Wamo–Rengifo | 3 | 0 | 3 | 3 | 0 | 6 | 0.000 | 77 | 126 | 0.611 |

| Date | Time | | Score | | Set 1 | Set 2 | Set 3 | Total |
|---|---|---|---|---|---|---|---|---|
| 7 Feb | 09:00 | Francioni–Carvalhaes (Brazil) | 1–2 | (Chile) Daga–Tovar | 19–21 | 21–14 | 14–16 | 54–51 |
| 7 Feb | 09:00 | Villafañe–Hernández (Venezuela) | 2–0 | (Peru) Wamo–Rengifo | 21–14 | 21–11 | | 42–25 |
| 7 Feb | 11:40 | Francioni–Carvalhaes (Brazil) | 2–0 | (Venezuela) Villafañe–Hernández | 21–19 | 21–19 | | 42–38 |
| 7 Feb | 11:40 | Daga–Tovar (Chile) | 2–0 | (Peru) Wamo–Rengifo | 21–18 | 21–13 | | 42–31 |
| 8 Feb | 09:00 | Francioni–Carvalhaes (Brazil) | 2–0 | (Peru) Wamo–Rengifo | 21–10 | 21–11 | | 42–21 |
| 8 Feb | 09:00 | Villafañe–Hernández (Venezuela) | 2–0 | (Chile) Daga–Tovar | 21–11 | 21–9 | | 42–20 |

=== Pool B ===
| Pos | Team | Pld | W | L | Pts | SW | SL | SR | SPW | SPL | SPR |
|---|---|---|---|---|---|---|---|---|---|---|---|
| 1 | (Brazil) Gaudie Ley–Barbosa | 3 | 2 | 1 | 5 | 5 | 3 | 1.667 | 142 | 138 | 1.029 |
| 2 | (Venezuela) Henríquez–Rangel | 3 | 2 | 1 | 5 | 4 | 3 | 1.333 | 123 | 132 | 0.932 |
| 3 | (Argentina) Del Coto–Bianchi | 3 | 1 | 2 | 4 | 3 | 4 | 0.750 | 132 | 114 | 1.158 |
| 4 | (Colombia) Cuesta–Corredor | 3 | 1 | 2 | 4 | 3 | 5 | 0.600 | 128 | 141 | 0.908 |

| Date | Time | | Score | | Set 1 | Set 2 | Set 3 | Total | Report |
|---|---|---|---|---|---|---|---|---|---|
| 7 Feb | 09:40 | Del Coto–Bianchi (Argentina) | 0–2 | (Venezuela) Henríquez–Rangel | 19–21 | 20–22 | | 39–43 | |
| 7 Feb | 09:40 | Gaudie Ley–Barbosa (Brazil) | 1–2 | (Colombia) Cuesta–Corredor | 21–19 | 18–21 | 12–15 | 51–55 | |
| 7 Feb | 12:20 | Cuesta–Corredor (Colombia) | 1–2 | (Venezuela) Henríquez–Rangel | 22–24 | 21–9 | 8–15 | 51–48 | |
| 7 Feb | 12:20 | Del Coto–Bianchi (Argentina) | 1–2 | (Brazil) Gaudie Ley–Barbosa | 21–13 | 17–21 | 13–15 | 51–49 | |
| 8 Feb | 09:40 | Del Coto–Bianchi (Argentina) | 2–0 | (Colombia) Cuesta–Corredor | 21–13 | 21–9 | | 42–22 | |
| 8 Feb | 09:40 | Gaudie Ley–Barbosa (Brazil) | 2–0 | (Venezuela) Henríquez–Rangel | 21–14 | 21–18 | | 42–32 | |

=== Pool C ===
| Pos | Team | Pld | W | L | Pts | SW | SL | SR | SPW | SPL | SPR |
|---|---|---|---|---|---|---|---|---|---|---|---|
| 1 | (Chile) Grimalt–Grimalt | 3 | 3 | 0 | 6 | 6 | 0 | MAX | 126 | 80 | 1.575 |
| 2 | (Argentina) Azaad–Mehamed | 3 | 2 | 1 | 5 | 4 | 2 | 2.000 | 124 | 92 | 1.348 |
| 3 | (Paraguay) Riveros–Brizuela | 3 | 1 | 2 | 4 | 2 | 4 | 0.500 | 100 | 98 | 1.020 |
| 4 | (Peru) Bramont–Heredia | 3 | 0 | 3 | 3 | 0 | 6 | 0.000 | 46 | 126 | 0.365 |

| Date | Time | | Score | | Set 1 | Set 2 | Set 3 | Total |
|---|---|---|---|---|---|---|---|---|
| 7 Feb | 10:20 | Grimalt–Grimalt (Chile) | 2–0 | (Peru) Bramont–Heredia | 21–8 | 21–11 | | 42–19 |
| 7 Feb | 10:20 | Azaad–Mehamed (Argentina) | 2–0 | (Paraguay) Riveros–Brizuela | 21–10 | 25–23 | | 46–33 |
| 7 Feb | 13:00 | Riveros–Brizuela (Paraguay) | 2–0 | (Peru) Bramont–Heredia | 21–6 | 21–4 | | 42–10 |
| 7 Feb | 13:00 | Grimalt–Grimalt (Chile) | 2–0 | (Argentina) Azaad–Mehamed | 21–18 | 21–18 | | 42–36 |
| 8 Feb | 10:20 | Azaad–Mehamed (Argentina) | 2–0 | (Peru) Bramont–Heredia | 21–9 | 21–8 | | 42–17 |
| 8 Feb | 10:20 | Grimalt–Grimalt (Chile) | 2–0 | (Paraguay) Riveros–Brizuela | 21–16 | 21–9 | | 42–25 |

=== Pool D ===
| Pos | Team | Pld | W | L | Pts | SW | SL | SR | SPW | SPL | SPR |
|---|---|---|---|---|---|---|---|---|---|---|---|
| 1 | (Uruguay) Cairus–Zanotta | 3 | 2 | 1 | 5 | 4 | 2 | 2.000 | 122 | 94 | 1.298 |
| 2 | (Chile) Martínez–Salinas | 3 | 2 | 1 | 5 | 4 | 2 | 2.000 | 121 | 103 | 1.175 |
| 3 | (Uruguay) Stoll–Molina | 3 | 2 | 1 | 5 | 4 | 2 | 2.000 | 112 | 105 | 1.067 |
| 4 | (Bolivia) Martínez–Franco | 3 | 0 | 3 | 3 | 0 | 6 | 0.000 | 73 | 126 | 0.579 |

| Date | Time | | Score | | Set 1 | Set 2 | Set 3 | Total |
|---|---|---|---|---|---|---|---|---|
| 7 Feb | 11:00 | Cairus–Zanotta (Uruguay) | 2–0 | (Uruguay) Stoll–Molina | 21–11 | 21–17 | | 42–28 |
| 7 Feb | 11:00 | Martínez–Salinas (Chile) | 2–0 | (Bolivia) Martínez–Franco | 21–14 | 21–19 | | 42–23 |
| 7 Feb | 13:40 | Martínez–Salinas (Chile) | 2–0 | (Uruguay) Cairus–Zanotta | 21–19 | 21–19 | | 42–38 |
| 7 Feb | 13:40 | Stoll–Molina (Uruguay) | 2–0 | (Bolivia) Martínez–Franco | 21–13 | 21–13 | | 42–26 |
| 7 Feb | 11:00 | Cairus–Zanotta (Uruguay) | 2–0 | (Bolivia) Martínez–Franco | 21–7 | 21–17 | | 42–24 |
| 7 Feb | 11:00 | Martínez–Salinas (Chile) | 0–2 | (Uruguay) Stoll–Molina | 18–21 | 19–21 | | 37–42 |

=== Championship bracket ===
Quarterfinals
A1 | (Brazil) Francioni–Carvalhaes | 2
D2 | (Chile) Martínez–Salinas | 1
C1 | (Chile) Grimalt–Grimalt | 2
B2 | (Venezuela) Henríquez–Rangel | 0
B1 | (Brazil) Gaudie Ley–Barbosa | 0
C2 | (Argentina) Azaad–Mehamed | 2
D1 | (Uruguay) Cairus–Zanotta | 2
A2 | (Venezuela) Villafañe–Hernández | 0

Semifinals
A1 | (Brazil) Francioni–Carvalhaes | 1
C1 | (Chile) Grimalt–Grimalt | 2
C2 | (Argentina) Azaad–Mehamed | 2
D1 | (Uruguay) Cairus–Zanotta | 0

Finals
C1 | (Chile) Grimalt–Grimalt | 1
C2 | (Argentina) Azaad–Mehamed | 2
Third place
A1 | (Brazil) Francioni–Carvalhaes | 2
D1 | (Uruguay) Cairus–Zanotta | 0

=== Quarterfinals ===
| Date | Time | | Score | | Set 1 | Set 2 | Set 3 | Total |
|---|---|---|---|---|---|---|---|---|
| 8 Feb | 14:00 | Francioni–Carvalhaes (Brazil) | 2–1 | (Chile) Martínez–Salinas | 21–12 | 18–21 | 15–10 | 54–43 |
| 8 Feb | 14:40 | Cairus–Zanotta (Uruguay) | 2–0 | (Venezuela) Villafañe–Hernández | 21–14 | 21–10 | | 42–24 |
| 8 Feb | 15:20 | Gaudie Ley–Barbosa (Brazil) | 0–2 | (Argentina) Azaad–Mehamed | 13–21 | 17–21 | | 30–42 |
| 8 Feb | 16:00 | Grimalt–Grimalt (Chile) | 2–0 | (Venezuela) Henríquez–Rangel | 21–14 | 21–14 | | 42–28 |

=== Semifinals ===
| Date | Time | | Score | | Set 1 | Set 2 | Set 3 | Total |
|---|---|---|---|---|---|---|---|---|
| 9 Feb | 09:00 | Cairus–Zanotta (Uruguay) | 0–2 | (Argentina) Azaad–Mehamed | 20–22 | 19–21 | | 39–43 |
| 9 Feb | 10:00 | Francioni–Carvalhaes (Brazil) | 1–2 | (Chile) Grimalt–Grimalt | 21–19 | 15–21 | 16–18 | 52–58 |

=== Third-place match ===
| Date | Time | | Score | | Set 1 | Set 2 | Set 3 | Total |
|---|---|---|---|---|---|---|---|---|
| 9 Feb | 14:00 | Cairus–Zanotta (Uruguay) | 0–2 | (Brazil) Francioni–Carvalhaes | 15–21 | 17–21 | | 32–42 |

=== Final ===
| Date | Time | | Score | | Set 1 | Set 2 | Set 3 | Total |
|---|---|---|---|---|---|---|---|---|
| 9 Feb | 17:00 | Grimalt–Grimalt (Chile) | 1–2 | (Argentina) Azaad–Mehamed | 16–21 | 21–14 | 16–14 | 53–49 |

=== Ranking ===
| Rank | Final ranking | Points |
|---|---|---|
| 1st place, gold medalist(s) | (Argentina) Azaad–Mehamed | 200 |
| 2nd place, silver medalist(s) | (Chile) Grimalt–Grimalt | 180 |
| 3rd place, bronze medalist(s) | (Brazil) Francioni–Carvalhaes | 160 |
| 4. | (Uruguay) Cairus–Zanotta | 140 |
| 5. | (Brazil) Gaudie Ley–Barbosa | - |
| 5. | (Chile) Martínez–Salinas | - |
| 5. | (Venezuela) Villafañe–Hernández | 120 |
| 5. | (Venezuela) Henríquez–Rangel | - |
| 9. | (Argentina) Del Coto–Bianchi | - |
| 9. | (Chile) Daga–Tovar | - |
| 9. | (Paraguay) Riveros–Brizuela | 100 |
| 9. | (Uruguay) Stoll–Molina | - |
| 13. | (Bolivia) Martínez–Franco | 100 |
| 13. | (Colombia) Cuesta–Corredor | 100 |
| 13. | (Peru) Wamo–Rengifo | 100 |
| 13. | (Peru) Bramont–Heredia | - |

== Ranking after first stop ==
=== Women ===
| Rank | Final ranking | Points |
|---|---|---|
| 1. | Brazil | 380 |
| 2. | Argentina | 340 |
| 3. | Uruguay | 260 |
| 4. | Chile | 220 |
| 4. | Paraguay | 220 |
| 6. | Bolivia | 200 |
| 7. | Venezuela | 160 |
| 8. | Colombia | 120 |
| 9. | Peru | 100 |

=== Men ===
| Rank | Final ranking | Points |
|---|---|---|
| 1. | Argentina | 380 |
| 2. | Brazil | 360 |
| 3. | Chile | 300 |
| 4. | Uruguay | 260 |
| 5. | Bolivia | 200 |
| 5. | Paraguay | 200 |
| 7. | Venezuela | 120 |
| 8. | Colombia | 100 |
| 8. | Peru | 100 |
