= Beach volleyball at the 2015 Pan American Games – Women's tournament =

Beach volleyball – Women's tournament at the 2015 Pan American Games
- Venue: Chevrolet Beach Volleyball Centre
- Dates: July 13–21
- Competitors: 32 from 16 nations

Medalists
Gold medal	Ana Gallay; Georgina Klug	Argentina
Silver medal	Lianma Flores; Leila Martinez	Cuba
Bronze medal	Carolina Horta; Liliane Maestrini	Brazil

The women's tournament competition of the beach volleyball events at the 2015 Pan American Games will take place between 13 and 21 of July at the Chevrolet Beach Volleyball Centre. The defending Pan American Games champions are Larissa França and Juliana Felisberta of Brazil.

Each of the 16 pairs in the tournament will be placed in one of four groups of four teams apiece, and play a round-robin within that pool. The top two teams in each pool advance to the Quarterfinals. The third along with the fourth-placed teams in each group, will be eliminated.

The 8 teams that advanced to the elimination rounds will play a single-elimination tournament with a bronze-medal match between the semifinal losers.

== Schedule ==
Date	Start	Finish	Phase
Monday July 13, 2015	9:00	23:00	Preliminaries
Tuesday July 14, 2015	9:00	23:00	Preliminaries
Wednesday July 15, 2015	9:00	23:00	Preliminaries
Thursday July 16, 2015	9:00	23:00	Preliminaries
Friday July 17, 2015	9:00	23:30	Elimination stage/Quarterfinal qualifiers
Saturday July 18, 2015	9:00	23:30	Quarterfinals
Sunday July 19, 2015	9:00	21:00	Semifinals
Monday July 20, 2015	9:00	21:00	Placement matches
Tuesday July 21, 2015	9:00	21:00	Gold/bronze-medal matches

== Results ==
=== Preliminary round ===
All times are Central Standard Time (UTC−06:00)

==== Group A ====
Pos	Team	Pld	W	L	Pts	SW	SL	SR	SPW	SPL	SPR	Qualification
1	Humana-Paredes – Pischke (CAN)	3	3	0	6	6	0	MAX	126	78	1.615	Quarterfinals
2	Gómez – Nieto (URU)	3	2	1	5	4	2	2.000	113	86	1.314	Elimination round
3	Bernier Colon – Torruella (PUR)	3	1	2	4	2	4	0.500	103	100	1.030	Elimination round
4	Powery – Smith-Johnson (CAY)	3	0	3	3	0	6	0.000	48	126	0.381	13th to 16th round

Date		Score		Set 1	Set 2	Set 3	Report
July 13	Humana-Paredes – Pischke (CAN)	2–0	Powery – Smith-Johnson (CAY)	21–8	21–10		
July 13	Gómez – Nieto (URU)	2–0	Bernier Colon – Torruella (PUR)	21–15	21–15		
July 14	Humana-Paredes – Pischke (CAN)	2–0	Bernier Colon – Torruella (PUR)	21–16	21–15		
July 14	Gómez – Nieto (URU)	2–0	Powery – Smith-Johnson (CAY)	21–7	21–7		
July 15	Humana-Paredes – Pischke (CAN)	2–0	Gómez – Nieto (URU)	21–15	21–14		
July 15	Bernier Colon – Torruella (PUR)	2–0	Powery – Smith-Johnson (CAY)	21–5	21–11		

==== Group B ====
Pos	Team	Pld	W	L	Pts	SW	SL	SR	SPW	SPL	SPR	Qualification
1	Maestrini – Horta (BRA)	3	3	0	6	6	1	6.000	138	81	1.704	Quarterfinals
2	Alfaro – Cope (CRC)	3	2	1	5	5	3	1.667	132	124	1.065	Elimination round
3	Mardones – Rivas (CHI)	3	1	2	4	3	5	0.600	119	138	0.862	Elimination round
4	Machado – Rodríguez (NIC)	3	0	3	3	1	6	0.167	88	134	0.657	13th to 16th round

Date		Score		Set 1	Set 2	Set 3	Report
July 13	Maestrini – Horta (BRA)	2–0	Machado – Rodríguez (NIC)	21–7	21–13		
July 13	Alfaro – Cope (CRC)	2–1	Mardones – Rivas (CHI)	16–21	21–14	15–11	
July 14	Maestrini – Horta (BRA)	2–0	Mardones – Rivas (CHI)	21–16	21–7		
July 14	Alfaro – Cope (CRC)	2–0	Machado – Rodríguez (NIC)	21–15	21–9		
July 16	Maestrini – Horta (BRA)	2–1	Alfaro – Cope (CRC)	21–11	18–21	15–6	
July 16	Mardones – Rivas (CHI)	2–1	Machado – Rodríguez (NIC)	21–13	14–21	15–10	

==== Group C ====
Pos	Team	Pld	W	L	Pts	SW	SL	SR	SPW	SPL	SPR	Qualification
1	Larsen – Metter (USA)	3	3	0	6	6	0	MAX	126	89	1.416	Quarterfinals
2	A Galindo – C Galindo (COL)	3	2	1	5	4	2	2.000	116	101	1.149	Elimination round
3	Molina – Soler (ESA)	3	1	2	4	2	5	0.400	113	137	0.825	Elimination round
4	Orellana – Recinos (GUA)	3	0	3	3	1	6	0.167	113	141	0.801	13th to 16th round

Date		Score		Set 1	Set 2	Set 3	Report
July 13	Larsen – Metter (USA)	2–0	Molina – Soler (ESA)	21–12	21–14		
July 13	A Galindo – C Galindo (COL)	2–0	Orellana – Recinos (GUA)	21–14	21–15		
July 15	A Galindo – C Galindo (COL)	2–0	Molina – Soler (ESA)	21–18	21–12		
July 15	Larsen – Metter (USA)	2–0	Orellana – Recinos (GUA)	21–13	21–18		
July 16	Larsen – Metter (USA)	2–0	A Galindo – C Galindo (COL)	21–14	21–18		
July 16	Orellana – Recinos (GUA)	1–2	Molina – Soler (ESA)	18–21	23–21	12–15	

==== Group D ====
Pos	Team	Pld	W	L	Pts	SW	SL	SR	SPW	SPL	SPR	Qualification
1	Flores – Martinez (CUB)	3	3	0	6	6	1	6.000	139	106	1.311	Quarterfinals
2	Gallay – Klug (ARG)	3	2	1	5	5	2	2.500	133	104	1.279	Elimination round
3	Candelas – Revuelta (MEX)	3	1	2	4	2	4	0.500	107	114	0.939	Elimination round
4	Davidson – Dyette (TRI)	3	0	3	3	0	6	0.000	75	130	0.577	13th to 16th round

Date		Score		Set 1	Set 2	Set 3	Report
July 14	Gallay – Klug (ARG)	2–0	Davidson – Dyette (TRI)	21–11	21–13		
July 14	Candelas – Revuelta (MEX)	0–2	Flores – Martinez (CUB)	18–21	18–21		
July 15	Gallay – Klug (ARG)	1–2	Flores – Martinez (CUB)	21–19	15–21	13–15	
July 15	Candelas – Revuelta (MEX)	2–0	Davidson – Dyette (TRI)	25–23	21–7		
July 16	Gallay – Klug (ARG)	2–0	Candelas – Revuelta (MEX)	21–15	21–10		
July 16	Flores – Martinez (CUB)	2–0	Davidson – Dyette (TRI)	21–12	21–9		

=== Elimination stage ===
==== 13th to 16th round ====
Date		Score		Set 1	Set 2	Set 3	Report
July 17	Powery – Smith-Johnson (CAY)	0–2	Davidson – Dyette (TRI)	18–21	18–21		
July 17	Machado – Rodríguez (NIC)	1–2	Orellana – Recinos (GUA)	12–21	23–21	8–15	

==== Elimination round ====
Date		Score		Set 1	Set 2	Set 3	Report
July 17	A Galindo – C Galindo (COL)	2–0	Bernier Colon – Torruella (PUR)	21–13	22–20		
July 17	Gallay – Klug (ARG)	2–0	Mardones – Rivas (CHI)	21–9	21–10		
July 17	Alfaro – Cope (CRC)	2–0	Candelas – Revuelta (MEX)	21–18	21–11		
July 17	Gómez – Nieto (URU)	2–0	Molina – Soler (ESA)	21–12	21–16		

==== 9th to 12th round ====
Date		Score		Set 1	Set 2	Set 3	Report
July 18	Candelas – Revuelta (MEX)	2–0	Bernier Colon – Torruella (PUR)	21–6	21–18		
July 18	Mardones – Rivas (CHI)	2–1	Molina – Soler (ESA)	21–15	19–21	15–8	

==== Quarterfinals ====
Date		Score		Set 1	Set 2	Set 3	Report
July 18	Larsen – Metter (USA)	0–2	Gallay – Klug (ARG)	18–21	12–21		
July 18	Flores – Martinez (CUB)	2–0	A Galindo – C Galindo (COL)	21–18	21–12		
July 18	Humana-Paredes – Pischke (CAN)	2–0	Alfaro – Cope (CRC)	21–12	21–12		
July 18	Maestrini – Horta (BRA)	2–1	Gómez – Nieto (URU)	21–14	19–21	15–11	

==== Semifinals ====
Date		Score		Set 1	Set 2	Set 3	Report
July 19	Humana-Paredes – Pischke (CAN)	1–2	Flores – Martinez (CUB)	18–21	21–17	7–15	
July 19	Gallay – Klug (ARG)	2–1	Maestrini – Horta (BRA)	21–17	21–23	15–13	

==== 5th to 8th round ====
Date		Score		Set 1	Set 2	Set 3	Report
July 20	Alfaro – Cope (CRC)	1–2	A Galindo – C Galindo (COL)	13–21	21–19	12–15	
July 20	Larsen – Metter (USA)	2–0	Gómez – Nieto (URU)	21–12	21–10		

=== Finals ===
==== 15th to 16th round ====
Date		Score		Set 1	Set 2	Set 3	Report
July 19	Powery – Smith-Johnson (CAY)	0–2	Machado – Rodríguez (NIC)	7–21	16–21		

==== 13th to 14th round ====
Date		Score		Set 1	Set 2	Set 3	Report
July 19	Davidson – Dyette (TRI)	0–2	Orellana – Recinos (GUA)	15–21	16–21		

==== 11th to 12th round ====
Date		Score		Set 1	Set 2	Set 3	Report
July 20	Bernier Colon – Torruella (PUR)	1–2	Molina – Soler (ESA)	25–23	19–21	14–16	

==== 9th to 10th round ====
Date		Score		Set 1	Set 2	Set 3	Report
July 20	Candelas – Revuelta (MEX)	2–0	Mardones – Rivas (CHI)	21–17	22–20		

==== 7th to 8th round ====
Date		Score		Set 1	Set 2	Set 3	Report
July 21	Alfaro – Cope (CRC)	0–2	Gómez – Nieto (URU)	15–21	12–21		

==== 5th to 6th round ====
Date		Score		Set 1	Set 2	Set 3	Report
July 21	A Galindo – C Galindo (COL)	1–2	Larsen – Metter (USA)	13–21	21–18	11–15	

==== Bronze-medal match ====
Date		Score		Set 1	Set 2	Set 3	Report
July 21	Humana-Paredes – Pischke (CAN)	0–2	Maestrini – Horta (BRA)	9–21	14–21		

==== Gold-medal match ====
Date		Score		Set 1	Set 2	Set 3	Report
July 21	Flores – Martinez (CUB)	1–2	Gallay – Klug (ARG)	17–21	21–19	7–15	

== Final standings ==
Rank	Team
1st place, gold medalist(s)	Ana Gallay – Georgina Klug (ARG)
2nd place, silver medalist(s)	Lianma Flores – Leila Martinez (CUB)
3rd place, bronze medalist(s)	Carolina Horta – Liliane Maestrini (BRA)
4	Melissa Humana-Paredes – Taylor Pischke (CAN)
5	Kelley Larsen – Betsi Metter (USA)
6	Andrea Galindo – Claudia Galindo (COL)
7	Fabiana Gómez – María Eugenia Nieto (URU)
8	Nathalia Alfaro – Karen Cope (CRC)
9	Bibiana Candelas – Martha Revuelta (MEX)
10	Pilar Mardones – Francisca Rivas (CHI)
11	Laura Molina – Ivonne Soler (ESA)
12	Lina Bernier Colon – Eva Torruella (PUR)
13	María José Orellana – Blanca Recinos (GUA)
14	Malika Davidson – Ayana Dyette (TRI)
15	Elia Machado – Lolette Rodríguez (NIC)
16	Ileann Powery – Chante Smith-Johnson (CAY)
