= Brenda Churín =

Argentine beach volleyball player

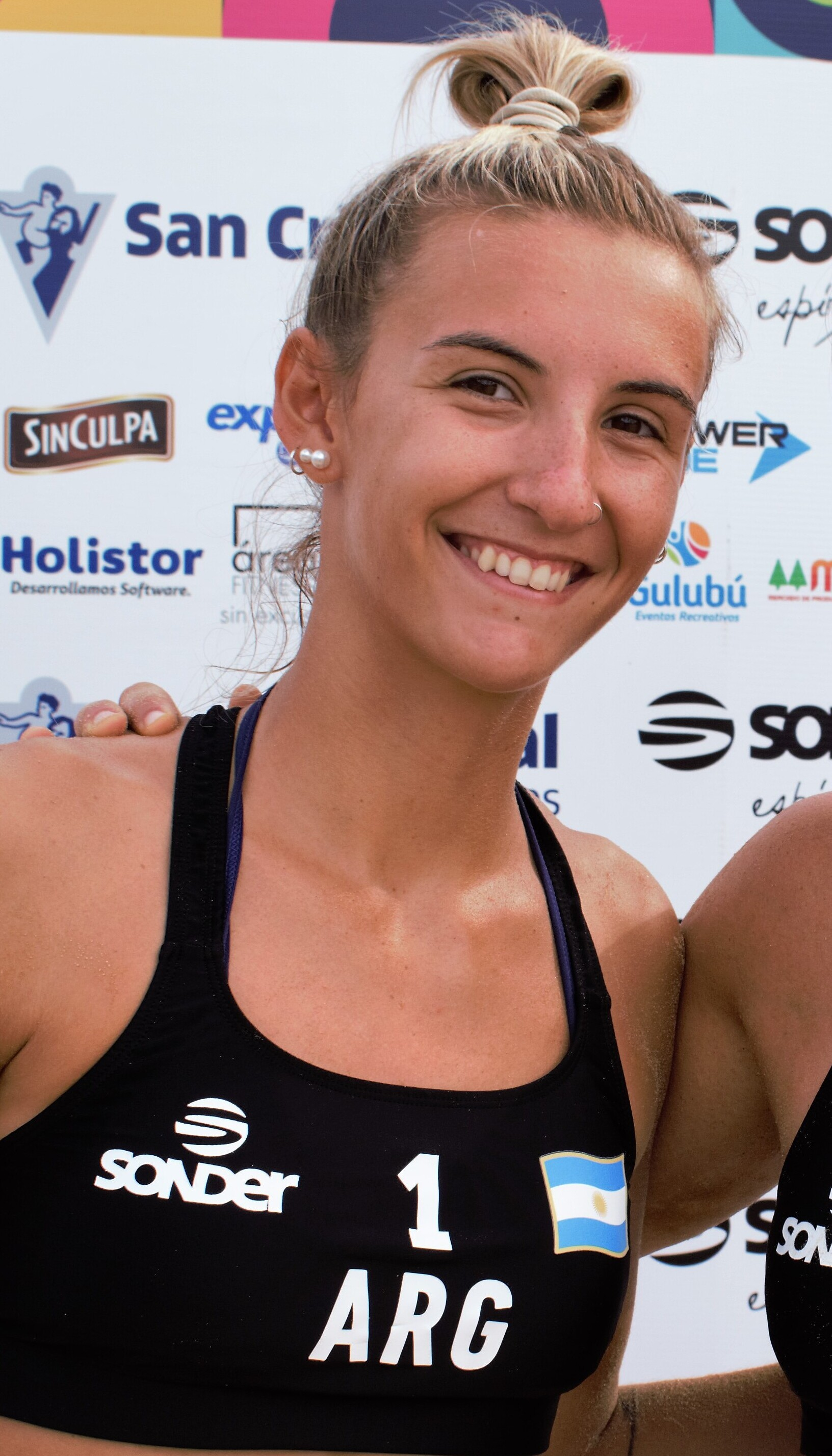
- Churín at the 2019 South American Beach Games

Personal information
- Full name: Brenda Ailén Churín
- Nationality: Argentina
- Born: 17 February 2000 (age 26); La Plata, Argentina

Brenda Ailén Churín (born 17 February 2000) is an Argentine beach volleyball player.

== Career ==
Early in her career, Churín competed alongside Delfina Villar at the 2018 Summer Youth Olympics in Buenos Aires. After debuting in a loss to Switzerland, the couple defeated Australia before losing to the United States team. The duo ended up eliminated in the round of 16 after losing to Spain.

In 2019 she began teaming up with María Zonta, and together they became champions of the Argentine Beach Volley Circuit that year in Cerrito, Entre Ríos. They then qualified for the 2019 South American Beach Games in Rosario, where they ultimately placed fourth, losing the bronze medal to the Colombian team.

In 2021, in addition to continuing her team with Zonta, she teamed up with Cecilia Peralta, with whom she won that year's National Circuit in Rosario after defeating Ana Gallay and Fernanda Pereyra. Churín and Peralta won the Continental Cup in Asunción, defeating the local Paraguayan team to qualify for the 2020 Summer Olympics in Tokyo.

In mid-2023, Churín teamed up with Ana Gallay, and together they won bronze in the South American Circuit that year in Lima after defeating Giuliana Poletti and Laura Ovelar from Paraguay, and shortly after they won the South American Beach Volleyball Championship that year in Cayenne. In 2024, the duo finished in fourth position in that year's South American Circuit in Uberlândia.
