= Beach volleyball at the 2011 Pan American Games – Women's tournament =

Beach volleyball – Women's tournament at the 2011 Pan American Games
- Venue: Pan American Beach Volleyball Stadium
- Dates: October 16–21
- Competitors: 32 from 16 nations

Medalists
Gold medal	Larissa França; Juliana Felisberta	Brazil
Silver medal	Bibiana Candelas; Mayra García	Mexico
Bronze medal	Yarleen Santiago; Yamileska Yantin	Puerto Rico

The women's tournament competition of the beach volleyball events at the 2011 Pan American Games will take place between 16 and 21 of October at the Pan American Beach Volleyball Stadium. The defending Pan American Games champion is Juliana Felisberta & Larissa França of Brazil.

Each of the 16 pairs in the tournament was placed in one of four groups of four teams apiece, and played a round-robin within that pool. The top two teams in each pool advanced to the Quarterfinals. The third along with the fourth-placed teams in each group, were eliminated.

The 8 teams that advanced to the elimination rounds played a single-elimination tournament with a bronze medal match between the semifinal losers.

== Schedule ==
Date	Start	Finish	Phase
Sunday October 16, 2011	9:00	18:00	Preliminaries
Monday October 17, 2011	9:00	18:00	Preliminaries
Tuesday October 18, 2011	9:00	18:00	Preliminaries
Wednesday October 19, 2011	9:00	18:00	Quarterfinals
Thursday October 20, 2011	9:00	15:00	Semifinals
Friday October 21, 2011	10:00	16:00	Gold/Bronze medal matches

== Preliminary round ==
All times are Central Standard Time (UTC−06:00)

=== Group E ===
Pos	Team	Pld	W	L	Pts	SW	SL	SR	SPW	SPL	SPR	Qualification
1	Candelas – García (MEX)	3	3	0	6	6	0	MAX	126	59	2.136	Quarterfinals
2	Gómez – Guigou (URU)	3	2	1	5	4	3	1.333	119	117	1.017	Quarterfinals
3	Morales – Alfaro (CRC)	3	1	2	4	3	4	0.750	107	123	0.870	
4	Hernández – Rodríguez (NCA)	3	0	3	3	0	6	0.000	70	126	0.556	

Date		Score		Set 1	Set 2	Set 3	Report
Oct 16	Gómez – Guigou (URU)	2–1	Morales – Alfaro (CRC)	16–21	21–14	15–13	
Oct 16	Candelas – García (MEX)	2–0	Hernández – Rodríguez (NCA)	21–5	21–12		
Oct 17	Gómez – Guigou (URU)	2–0	Hernández – Rodríguez (NCA)	21–12	21–15		
Oct 17	Candelas – García (MEX)	2–0	Morales – Alfaro (CRC)	21–8	21–9		
Oct 18	Morales – Alfaro (CRC)	2–0	Hernández – Rodríguez (NCA)	21–14	21–15		
Oct 18	Candelas – García (MEX)	2–0	Gómez – Guigou (URU)	21–15	21–10		

=== Group F ===
Pos	Team	Pld	W	L	Pts	SW	SL	SR	SPW	SPL	SPR	Qualification
1	França – Silva (BRA)	3	3	0	6	6	0	MAX	126	73	1.726	Quarterfinals
2	Sinal – Sinal (CUB)	3	2	1	5	4	3	1.333	125	108	1.157	Quarterfinals
3	Chila – Vilela (ECU)	3	1	2	4	2	5	0.400	129	139	0.928	
4	Dyette – Phillip (TRI)	3	0	3	3	1	6	0.167	81	141	0.574	

Date		Score		Set 1	Set 2	Set 3	Report
Oct 16	Sinal – Sinal (CUB)	2–1	Chila – Vilela (ECU)	18–21	21–15	15–13	
Oct 16	França – Silva (BRA)	2–0	Dyette – Phillip (TRI)	21–5	21–16		
Oct 17	Sinal – Sinal (CUB)	2–0	Dyette – Phillip (TRI)	21–12	21–14		
Oct 17	França – Silva (BRA)	2–0	Chila – Vilela (ECU)	21–12	21–11		
Oct 18	França – Silva (BRA)	2–0	Sinal – Sinal (CUB)	21–16	21–13		
Oct 18	Dyette – Phillip (TRI)	1–2	Chila – Vilela (ECU)	14–21	23–21	6–15	

=== Group G ===
Pos	Team	Pld	W	L	Pts	SW	SL	SR	SPW	SPL	SPR	Qualification
1	Santiago – Yantin (PUR)	3	3	0	6	6	1	6.000	138	98	1.408	Quarterfinals
2	Bansley – Maloney (CAN)	3	2	1	5	4	3	1.333	134	107	1.252	Quarterfinals
3	Gallay – Zonta (ARG)	3	1	2	4	4	4	1.000	143	124	1.153	
4	Avalos – Romero (ESA)	3	0	3	3	0	6	0.000	48	126	0.381	

Date		Score		Set 1	Set 2	Set 3	Report
Oct 16	Santiago – Yantin (PUR)	2–0	Avalos – Romero (ESA)	21–4	21–7		
Oct 16	Gallay – Zonta (ARG)	1–2	Bansley – Maloney (CAN)	21–18	20–22	6–15	
Oct 17	Santiago – Yantin (PUR)	2–0	Bansley – Maloney (CAN)	21–19	21–18		
Oct 17	Gallay – Zonta (ARG)	2–0	Avalos – Romero (ESA)	21–14	21–5		
Oct 18	Santiago – Yantin (PUR)	2–1	Gallay – Zonta (ARG)	21–18	18–21	15–11	
Oct 18	Bansley – Maloney (CAN)	2–0	Avalos – Romero (ESA)	21–10	21–8		

=== Group H ===
Pos	Team	Pld	W	L	Pts	SW	SL	SR	SPW	SPL	SPR	Qualification
1	Day – Hughes (USA)	3	3	0	6	6	1	6.000	147	106	1.387	Quarterfinals
2	Galindo – Galindo (COL)	3	2	1	5	4	3	1.333	129	118	1.093	Quarterfinals
3	Orellana – Ramírez (GUA)	3	1	2	4	4	4	1.000	148	142	1.042	
4	Pazlivek – Rivas (CHI)	3	0	3	3	0	6	0.000	67	126	0.532	

Date		Score		Set 1	Set 2	Set 3	Report
Oct 16	Galindo – Galindo (COL)	2–1	Orellana – Ramírez (GUA)	21–19	18–21	15–10	
Oct 16	Day – Hughes (USA)	2–0	Pazlivek – Rivas (CHI)	21–10	21–7		
Oct 17	Galindo – Galindo (COL)	2–0	Pazlivek – Rivas (CHI)	21–12	21–13		
Oct 17	Day – Hughes (USA)	2–1	Orellana – Ramírez (GUA)	28–26	20–22	15–8	
Oct 18	Galindo – Galindo (COL)	0–2	Day – Hughes (USA)	19–21	14–21		
Oct 18	Pazlivek – Rivas (CHI)	0–2	Orellana – Ramírez (GUA)	17–21	8–21		

== Elimination stage ==
Quarterfinals
H2	Galindo – Galindo (COL)	16	13
E1	Candelas – García (MEX)	21	21
H1	Day – Hughes (USA)	21	21
E2	Gómez – Guigou (URU)	12	12
F2	Sinal – Sinal (CUB)	16	18
G1	Santiago – Yantin (PUR)	21	21
F1	França – Silva (BRA)	21	21
G2	Bansley – Maloney (CAN)	15	16

Semifinals
E1	Candelas – García (MEX)	21	21
H1	Day – Hughes (USA)	12	14
G1	Santiago – Yantin (PUR)	16	12
F1	França – Silva (BRA)	21	21

Gold medal match
E1	Candelas – García (MEX)	15	24	20
F1	França – Silva (BRA)	21	22	22
Bronze medal match
H1	Day – Hughes (USA)	16	21	7
G1	Santiago – Yantin (PUR)	21	16	15

=== Quarterfinals ===
Date		Score		Set 1	Set 2	Set 3	Report
Oct 19	Candelas – García (MEX)	2–0	Galindo – Galindo (COL)	21–16	21–13		
Oct 19	Day – Hughes (USA)	2–0	Gómez – Guigou (URU)	21–12	21–12		
Oct 19	Sinal – Sinal (CUB)	0–2	Santiago – Yantin (PUR)	16–21	18–21		
Oct 19	França – Silva (BRA)	2–0	Bansley – Maloney (CAN)	21–15	21–16		

=== Semifinals ===
Date		Score		Set 1	Set 2	Set 3	Report
Oct 20	Candelas – García (MEX)	2–0	Day – Hughes (USA)	21-12	21-14		
Oct 20	Santiago – Yantin (PUR)	0–2	França – Silva (BRA)	16-21	12-21		

=== Bronze medal match ===
Date		Score		Set 1	Set 2	Set 3	Report
Oct 21	Day – Hughes (USA)	1–2	Santiago – Yantin (PUR)	16-21	21-16	7-15	

=== Gold medal match ===
Date		Score		Set 1	Set 2	Set 3	Report
Oct 21	Candelas – García (MEX)	1–2	França – Silva (BRA)	15-21	24-22	20-22	
