= 2013–14 South American Beach Volleyball Circuit (Gutape, Colombia) =

2014 South American Beach Volleyball Circuit (Gutapé Stop)
Tournament details
- Host country: Colombia
- Dates: May 30 – June 1, 2014
- Teams: 16 (each sex)
- Venue: Gutapé (in Medellín host cities)

Medellín in Colombia was the eighth leg and second to last of the 2013–14 South American Beach Volleyball Circuit. The tournament was held May 30 – June 1, 2014.

32 teams participated in the event (16 per sex).

== Women's competition ==
=== Participating teams ===
- (Argentina) ARG1 Virginia Zonta – Julieta Puntin
- (Argentina) ARG2 Camila Hiruela – Irene Verasio
- (Brazil) BRA Fernanda Berti – Elize Maia
- (Chile) CHI Camila Pazdirek – Francesca Rivas
- (Ecuador) ECU Mishelle Molina – Ariana Becerra
- (Colombia) COL1 Erica Grisales – Cindy Garcia
- (Colombia) COL2 Andrea Galindo – Jeimy Luna
- (Colombia) COL3 Cristina Escobar – Rosa Beltran
- (Colombia) COL4 Johana Mora – Katerine Valderrama
- (Colombia) COL5 Sadat Rios – Wendy Rojas
- (Colombia) COL6 Marly Ardila – Laura Salazar
- (Paraguay) PAR Michelle Valiente – Erika Mongelos
- (Peru) PER Andrea Sandoval – Cinthia Herrera
- (Uruguay) URU Lucia Guigou – Fabiana Gómez
- (Venezuela) VEN1 Olaya Pazos – Yetsi Lezama
- (Venezuela) VEN2 Milagros Hernández – Frankelina Rodríguez

=== Pools ===
| Pool A | Pool B | Pool C | Pool D |
|---|---|---|---|
| (Brazil) BRA (Colombia) COL6 (Peru) PER (Ecuador) ECU | (Argentina) ARG1 (Argentina) ARG2 (Venezuela) VEN1 (Colombia) COL5 | (Colombia) COL2 (Colombia) COL4 (Uruguay) URU (Paraguay) PAR | (Colombia) COL1 (Chile) CHI (Colombia) COL3 (Venezuela) VEN2 |

=== Pool A ===
| Pos | Team | Pld | W | L | Pts | SW | SL | SR | SPW | SPL | SPR |
|---|---|---|---|---|---|---|---|---|---|---|---|
| 1 | (Brazil) Berti – Maia | 0 | 0 | 0 | 0 | 0 | 0 | — | 0 | 0 | — |
| 2 | (Colombia) Ardila – Salazar | 0 | 0 | 0 | 0 | 0 | 0 | — | 0 | 0 | — |
| 3 | (Ecuador) Molina – Becerra | 0 | 0 | 0 | 0 | 0 | 0 | — | 0 | 0 | — |
| 4 | (Peru) Sandoval – Herrera | 0 | 0 | 0 | 0 | 0 | 0 | — | 0 | 0 | — |

| Date | Time | | Score | | Set 1 | Set 2 | Set 3 | Total |
|---|---|---|---|---|---|---|---|---|
| 30 May | 09:00 | Berti – Maia (Brazil) | – | (Colombia) Ardila – Salazar | – | – | – | – |
| 30 May | 09:00 | Sandoval – Herrera (Peru) | – | (Ecuador) Molina – Becerra | – | – | – | – |
| 30 May | 11:40 | Berti – Maia (Brazil) | – | (Ecuador) Molina – Becerra | – | – | – | – |
| 30 May | 11:40 | Ardila – Salazar (Colombia) | – | (Peru) Sandoval – Herrera | – | – | – | – |
| 31 May | 09:00 | Berti – Maia (Brazil) | – | (Peru) Sandoval – Herrera | – | – | – | – |
| 31 May | 09:00 | Ardila – Salazar (Colombia) | – | (Ecuador) Molina – Becerra | – | – | – | – |

=== Pool B ===
| Pos | Team | Pld | W | L | Pts | SW | SL | SR | SPW | SPL | SPR |
|---|---|---|---|---|---|---|---|---|---|---|---|
| 1 | (Argentina) Zonta – Puntin | 0 | 0 | 0 | 0 | 0 | 0 | — | 0 | 0 | — |
| 2 | (Argentina) Hiruela – Verasio | 0 | 0 | 0 | 0 | 0 | 0 | — | 0 | 0 | — |
| 3 | (Venezuela) Pasos – Lezama | 0 | 0 | 0 | 0 | 0 | 0 | — | 0 | 0 | — |
| 4 | (Colombia) Rios – Rojas | 0 | 0 | 0 | 0 | 0 | 0 | — | 0 | 0 | — |

| Date | Time | | Score | | Set 1 | Set 2 | Set 3 | Total |
|---|---|---|---|---|---|---|---|---|
| 30 May | 09:40 | Zonta – Puntin (Argentina) | – | (Argentina) Hiruela – Verasio | – | – | – | – |
| 30 May | 09:40 | Pasos – Lezama (Venezuela) | – | (Colombia) Rios – Rojas | – | – | – | – |
| 30 May | 12:20 | Rios – Rojas (Colombia) | – | (Argentina) Zonta – Puntin | – | – | – | – |
| 30 May | 12:20 | Hiruela – Verasio (Argentina) | – | (Venezuela) Pasos – Lezama | – | – | – | – |
| 31 May | 09:40 | Pasos – Lezama (Venezuela) | – | (Argentina) Zonta – Puntin | – | – | – | – |
| 31 May | 09:40 | Rios – Rojas (Colombia) | – | (Argentina) Hiruela – Verasio | – | – | – | – |

=== Pool C ===
| Pos | Team | Pld | W | L | Pts | SW | SL | SR | SPW | SPL | SPR |
|---|---|---|---|---|---|---|---|---|---|---|---|
| 1 | (Uruguay) Guigou – Gómez | 0 | 0 | 0 | 0 | 0 | 0 | — | 0 | 0 | — |
| 2 | (Colombia) Galindo – Luna | 0 | 0 | 0 | 0 | 0 | 0 | — | 0 | 0 | — |
| 3 | (Paraguay) Valiente – Mongelos | 0 | 0 | 0 | 0 | 0 | 0 | — | 0 | 0 | — |
| 4 | (Colombia) Mora – Valderrama | 0 | 0 | 0 | 0 | 0 | 0 | — | 0 | 0 | — |

| Date | Time | | Score | | Set 1 | Set 2 | Set 3 | Total |
|---|---|---|---|---|---|---|---|---|
| 30 May | 10:20 | Guigou – Gómez (Uruguay) | – | (Paraguay) Valiente – Mongelos | – | – | – | – |
| 30 May | 10:20 | Galindo – Luna (Colombia) | – | (Colombia) Mora – Valderrama | – | – | – | – |
| 30 May | 13:00 | Mora – Valderrama (Colombia) | – | (Uruguay) Guigou – Gómez | – | – | – | – |
| 30 May | 13:00 | Valiente – Mongelos (Paraguay) | – | (Colombia) Galindo – Luna | – | – | – | – |
| 31 May | 10:20 | Guigou – Gómez (Uruguay) | – | (Colombia) Galindo – Luna | – | – | – | – |
| 31 May | 10:20 | Valiente – Mongelos (Paraguay) | – | (Colombia) Mora – Valderrama | – | – | – | – |

=== Pool D ===
| Pos | Team | Pld | W | L | Pts | SW | SL | SR | SPW | SPL | SPR |
|---|---|---|---|---|---|---|---|---|---|---|---|
| 1 | (Colombia) Grisales – García | 0 | 0 | 0 | 0 | 0 | 0 | — | 0 | 0 | — |
| 2 | (Chile) Pazdirek – Rivas | 0 | 0 | 0 | 0 | 0 | 0 | — | 0 | 0 | — |
| 3 | (Colombia) Escobar – Beltran | 0 | 0 | 0 | 0 | 0 | 0 | — | 0 | 0 | — |
| 4 | (Venezuela) Hernández – Rodríguez | 0 | 0 | 0 | 0 | 0 | 0 | — | 0 | 0 | — |

| Date | Time | | Score | | Set 1 | Set 2 | Set 3 | Total |
|---|---|---|---|---|---|---|---|---|
| 30 May | 11:00 | Grisales – García (Colombia) | – | (Colombia) Escobar – Beltran | – | – | – | – |
| 30 May | 11:00 | Pazdirek – Rivas (Chile) | – | (Venezuela) Hernández – Rodríguez | – | – | – | – |
| 30 May | 13:40 | Grisales – García (Colombia) | – | (Venezuela) Hernández – Rodríguez | – | – | – | – |
| 30 May | 13:40 | Pazdirek – Rivas (Chile) | – | (Colombia) Escobar – Beltran | – | – | – | – |
| 31 May | 11:00 | Escobar – Beltran (Colombia) | – | (Venezuela) Hernández – Rodríguez | – | – | – | – |
| 31 May | 11:00 | Pazdirek – Rivas (Chile) | – | (Colombia) Grisales – García | – | – | – | – |

== Men's competition ==
=== Participating teams ===
- (Argentina) ARG1 Ian Mehamed – Facundo del Coto
- (Argentina) ARG2 Leandro Aveiro – Aulisi Santiago
- (Bolivia) BOL Israel Martínez – Sergio Franco
- (Brazil) BRA1 Evandro Gonçalves – Victor Gonçalves
- (Brazil) BRA2 Harley Silva – Joallyson Gomez
- (Chile) CHI Esteban Grimalt – Marco Grimalt
- (Colombia) COL1 Julián Carmona – Juan Camilo Gil
- (Colombia) COL2 Jorge Cabrera – Juan David Paternina
- (Colombia) COL4 Omar Zapata – Andrés Ramírez
- (Colombia) COL3 Johan Murray – Jorge Manjarres
- (Colombia) COL5 Gustavo Piedrahita – Álex Racero
- (Colombia) COL6 Henry Castro – Gdeivi Paez
- (Colombia) COL7 Carlos Vásquez – Jhon Castro
- (Uruguay) URU Michael González – Marco Cairus
- (Venezuela) VEN1 Vicente Salazar – Gerardo Méndez
- (Venezuela) VEN2 Ronald Fayola – Carlos Rangel

=== Pools ===
| Pool A | Pool B | Pool C | Pool D |
|---|---|---|---|
| (Brazil) BRA1 (Brazil) BRA2 (Argentina) ARG2 (Colombia) COL7 | (Colombia) COL1 (Argentina) ARG1 (Colombia) COL2 (Colombia) COL5 | (Uruguay) URU (Venezuela) VEN1 (Colombia) COL3 (Colombia) COL4 | (Chile) CHI (Venezuela) VEN2 (Colombia) COL6 (Bolivia) BOL |
