= 2018–2020 CSV Beach Volleyball Continental Cup =

The 2018–2020 CSV Beach Volleyball Continental Cup were a beach volleyball double-gender event. Teams from South American countries were split into groups of four, where an elimination bracket determined the 2 teams to advance to the next stage from the sub-zones. The winners of the event qualified for the 2020 Summer Olympics.

== Phase 1 ==
=== Men ===
==== Pool A ====
Pool A was contested in Brasília, Brazil.

Semifinals		Final
Venezuela	4
Paraguay	0	Brazil	4
Brazil	4	Venezuela	0
Bolivia	0

- Third place: Bolivia 3–1 Paraguay
- Brazil qualified for final phase. Venezuela qualified to phase 3. Bolivia qualified to phase 2.

==== Pool B ====
Pool B was contested in Mar del Plata, Argentina.

Semifinals		Final
Ecuador	0
Colombia	3	Argentina	3
		Colombia	1

- Argentina qualified for final phase. Colombia qualified for third phase.

==== Pool C ====
Pool B was contested in Coquimbo, Chile.

Semifinals		Final
Chile	3
French Guiana	0	Chile	2
Uruguay	3	Uruguay	1
Peru	0

- Third place: Peru 0–3 French Guiana
- Chile qualified for final phase. Uruguay and French Guiana qualified to phase 2.

=== Women ===
==== Pool A ====
Pool A was contested in Brasília, Brazil.

Semifinals		Final
Uruguay	1
Ecuador	3	Brazil	2
		Ecuador	1

- Brazil qualified to third round.

==== Pool B ====
Pool B was contested in Coquimbo, Chile.

Semifinals		Final
Chile	2
Venezuela	3	Colombia	3
Colombia	3	Venezuela	2
French Guiana	0

- Third place: Chile 3–0 French Guiana
- Colombia qualified for phase 3. Venezuela and Chile qualified to phase 2.

==== Pool C ====
Pool C was contested in Asunción, Paraguay.

Semifinals		Final
Argentina	3
Bolivia	0	Paraguay	0
Paraguay	3	Argentina	3
Peru	0

- Third place: Bolivia 0–3 Peru
- Argentina qualified for third round. Paraguay and Peru qualified to phase 2.

== Phase 2 ==
=== Men ===
- Phase 2 was contested in Portoviejo, Ecuador.

Quarterfinal		Semifinal		Final
Ecuador	4
Bolivia	0	Bolivia	2
		French Guiana	3
				Ecuador	3
				French Guiana	1

- Ecuador qualified for third phase.

=== Women ===
- Phase 2 was contested in Montevideo, Uruguay.

Quarterfinal		Semifinal		Final
Uruguay	2
Peru	3	Chile	3
		Peru	1
				Uruguay	2
				Chile	3

- Chile qualified for third phase.

== Phase 3 ==
=== Men ===
Date	Time		Score		Set 1	Set 2	Set 3	Total	Report
		Venezuela	3–1	Colombia					
1 Feb	8:00	Henríquez–Charly	2–0	Perea–Corredor	21–15	21–14		42–29	
1 Feb	8:50	Hernán–Mussa	2–0	Rivas–Denis	21–13	21–17		42–30	
1 Feb	15:30	Henríquez–Charly	2–0	Rivas–Denis	21–12	21–17		42–29	
1 Feb	16:20	Hernán–Mussa	1–2	Perea–Corredor	16–21	21–12	11–15	48–48	

Date	Time		Score		Set 1	Set 2	Set 3	Total	Report
		Uruguay	3–1	Ecuador					
1 Feb	9:40	Moccelini–Cairus	1–2	Jaramillo–Marcos	21–15	17–21	11–15	49–51	
1 Feb	10:30	Hannibal–Baldi	2–0	Leon–Quiñones	21–17	21–9		42–26	
1 Feb	17:10	Moccelini–Cairus	2–0	Leon–Quiñones	21–17	21–9		42–26	
1 Feb	18:00	Hannibal–Baldi	2–0	Jaramillo–Marcos	21–18	21–17		42–35	

Date	Time		Score		Set 1	Set 2	Set 3	Total	Report
		Colombia	2–2	Ecuador					
2 Feb	8:00	Rivas–Denis	0–2	Jaramillo–Marcos	14–21	17–21		31–42	
2 Feb	8:50	Perea–Corredor	2–0	Leon–Quiñones	21–13	21–15		42–28	
2 Feb	15:30	Rivas–Denis	2–1	Leon–Quiñones	22–20	18–21	16–14	56–55	
2 Feb	16:20	Perea–Corredor	1–2	Jaramillo–Marcos	21–16	18–21	11–15	50–52	

- Colombia took third place.

Date	Time		Score		Set 1	Set 2	Set 3	Total	Report
		Uruguay	2–3	Venezuela					
2 Feb	9:40	Moccelini–Cairus	1–2	Hernán–Mussa	16–21	21–16	16–18	53–55	
2 Feb	10:30	Hannibal–Baldi	2–1	Henríquez–Charly	13–21	21–17	15–10	49–48	
2 Feb	17:10	Moccelini–Cairus	0–2	Henríquez–Charly	24–26	18–21		42–45	
2 Feb	18:00	Hannibal–Baldi	2–0	Hernán–Mussa	21–13	21–17		42–30	
2 Feb	19:50	Uruguay	13–15 (GS)	Venezuela					

- Venezuela took first place.
- Uruguay took second place
- Venezuela will play in the final round against Argentina, Brazil and Chile.
