= Mardones =

Mardones is a surname. Notable people with the surname include:

- Benny Mardones (1946–2020), American singer
- Francisca Mardones (parathlete) (born 1977), Chilean wheelchair tennis player
- Patricio Mardones (born 1962), Chilean footballer
- Pilar Mardones (born 1989), Chilean volleyball player
