= Beach volleyball at the 2015 Pan American Games =

- Beach volleyball pictogram for the games
- Venue: Chevrolet Beach Volleyball Centre
- Dates: July 13–21
- No. of events: 2 (1 men, 1 women)
- Competitors: 64 from 19 nations

Beach volleyball competitions at the 2015 Pan American Games in Toronto were held from July 13 to 21 at a temporary facility in Exhibition Place called the Chevrolet Beach Volleyball Centre. A total of two beach volleyball tournaments were held: one each for the men and women.

== Competition schedule ==
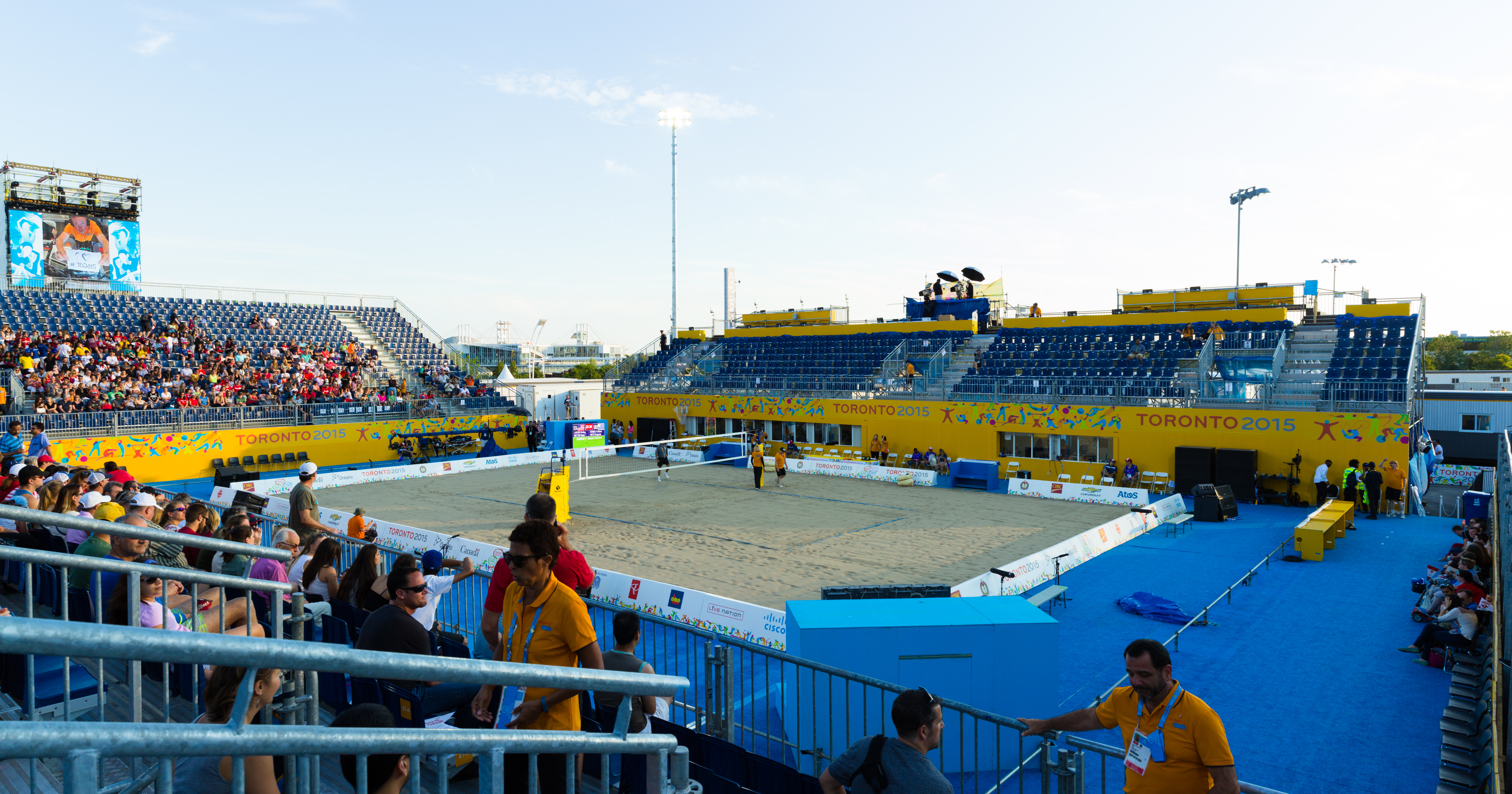
The Chevrolet Beach Volleyball Centre, was the venue for the beach volleyball competitions

The following is the competition schedule for the beach volleyball competitions:

P	Preliminaries	¼	Quarterfinals	½	Semifinals	C	Classification matches	B	3rd place play-off	F	Final

Event↓/Date →	Mon 13	Tue 14	Wed 15	Thu 16	Fri 17	Sat 18	Sun 19	Mon 20	Tue 21	
Men	P	P	P	P	P	¼	½	C	B	F
Women	P	P	P	P	P	¼	½	C	B	F

== Medal table ==
Rank	Nation	Gold	Silver	Bronze	Total
1	Argentina	1	0	0	1
1	Mexico	1	0	0	1
3	Brazil	0	1	1	2
3	Cuba	0	1	1	2
Totals (4 entries)		2	2	2	6

== Medalists ==
Event	Gold	Silver	Bronze
Men's tournament	Mexico; Rodolfo Ontiveros; Juan Virgen	Brazil; Vitor Araujo; Álvaro Morais Filho	Cuba; Nivaldo Diaz; Sergio González
Women's tournament	Argentina; Ana Gallay; Georgina Klug	Cuba; Lianma Flores; Leila Martinez	Brazil; Carolina Horta; Liliane Maestrini

== Qualification ==
A total of sixteen teams per gender qualified to compete at the games. The host nation (Canada) qualified in each event automatically, along with the top five ranked nations in South America and the top ten nations ranked in North, Central America and the Caribbean. The rankings on January 1, 2015 were used to determine the teams.

== Participating nations ==
A total of 19 nations qualified athletes. The numbers in parentheses represent the number of participants entered.

- Aruba (2)
- Argentina (4)
- Brazil (4)
- Canada (4)
- Cayman Islands (2)
- Chile (4)
- Colombia (2)
- Costa Rica (2)
- Cuba (4)
- El Salvador (4)
- Guatemala (4)
- Mexico (4)
- Nicaragua (4)
- Puerto Rico (4)
- Saint Lucia (2)
- Trinidad and Tobago (4)
- United States (4)
- Uruguay (4)
- Venezuela (2)

== See also ==
- Volleyball at the 2016 Summer Olympics
