= Liliane Maestrini =

Brazilian beach volleyball player (born 1987)

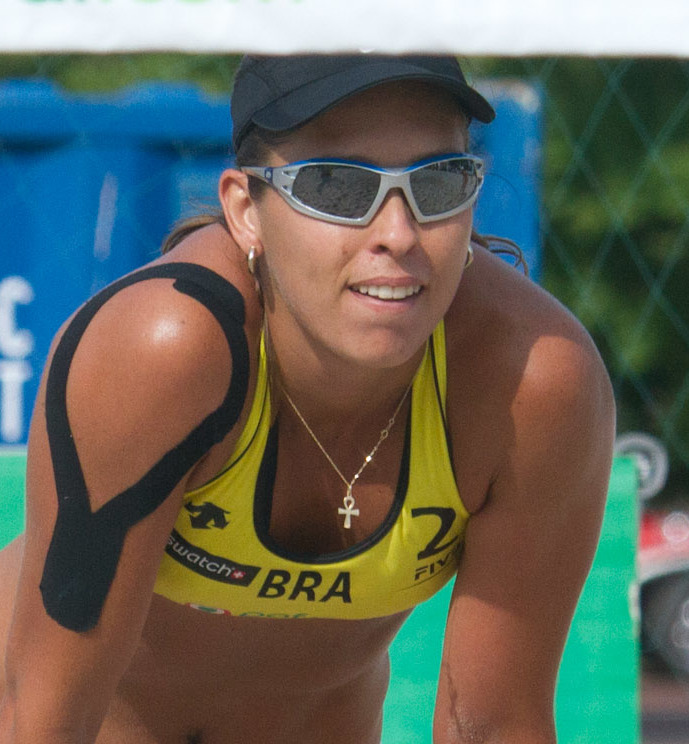
- Maestrini in Mariehamn, Finland in 2012

Personal information
- Full name: Liliane Simões Maestrini
- Born: 26 October 1987 (age 39); Vitória, Espírito Santo, Brazil
- Height: 6 ft 0 in (183 cm)
Honours
Women's beach volleyball
Representing Brazil
Pan American Games
Bronze medal – third place	2015 Toronto	Beach
World Championships
Bronze medal – third place	2013 Stare Jabłonki	Beach
World Tour
Gold medal – first place	2011 London	Beach
Silver medal – second place	2013 Gstaad	Beach
Bronze medal – third place	2013 Rome	Beach
Youth World Championships
Gold medal – first place	2007 Modena	Beach U21
CEV Challenger & Satellites
Gold medal – first place	2009 Vaduz	Beach

Liliane "Lili" Simões Maestrini (born 26 October 1987) is a Brazilian beach volleyball player.

She won bronze medals at the 2013 World Championships alongside her teammate Bárbara Seixas and the 2015 Pan American Games alongside Carolina Horta.

She is the 2007 World U21 Champion and has reached the podium in several FIVB Beach Volleyball World Tour tournaments.

== Personal life ==
In August 2013, Liliane married fellow female player Larissa França.
