= 2013–14 South American Beach Volleyball Circuit =

2013-14 South American Beach Volleyball Circuit
Tournament details
- Host country: various
- Dates: December 2013 – May 2014
- Venue: various (in 9 host cities)

The 2013–14 South American Beach Volleyball Circuit was a South American beach volleyball tour. The tour consisted of nine tournaments in both genders.

The tournament was in the 2013 calendar, however, the first tournament began in January 2014.

== Tournaments ==
- Macaé Tournament, Brazil, January 24–26
- Viña Tournament, Viña del Mar, Chile, February 7–9
- Montevideo Tournament, Montevideo, Uruguay, February 14–16
- Trilce Tournament, Lima, Peru, February 28 – March 2
- Sucre Tournament, Sucre, Bolivia, March 21–23
- Cochabamba Tournament, Cochabamba, Bolivia, March 28–30
- Tucuman Tournament, Tucuman, Argentina, April 11–13
- Vargas Tournament, Caracas, Venezuela, May 20–23
- Gutape Tournament, Cali, Colombia, May 30 – June 1
- Asunción Tournament, Asunción, Paraguay, June 6–8
