= Renzo Cairus =

Uruguayan volleyball player (born 1990)

Personal information
- Full name: Renzo Cairus Lucarelli
- Born: 12 March 1990 (age 36); Montevideo, Uruguay

Beach volleyball information
Years	Teammate
2015; 2014	Mauricio Vieyto; Nicolás Zanotta

Indoor volleyball information
- Current club: Urbia Voley Palma

Renzo Cairus Lucarelli (born 12 March 1990 in Montevideo) is a Uruguayan beach volleyball and indoor volleyball player. He currently plays for Urbia Voley Palma in the Spanish Superliga de Voleibol Masculina.

== Results ==
Pan American Games

- 2015 Toronto: 5th (with Mauricio Vieyto)

FIVB Beach Volleyball World Tour

- 2010 Brasilia Open: 41st
- 2013 Anapa Open: 17th

South American Beach Volleyball Circuit

- 2014 Brazil: 5th (with Nicolás Zanotta)
- 2014 Chile: 4th (with Nicolás Zanotta)
