= Julian Azaad =

Argentine beach volleyball player

Personal information
- Full name: Julian Amado Azaad
- Nationality: Argentina
- Born: 26 December 1990 (age 35) Cerrito, Entre Ríos, Argentina
- Height: 1.94 m (6 ft 4 in)

Sport
- Sport: Beach volleyball
Medal record
Representing Argentina
Pan American Games
Bronze medal – third place	2019 Lima	Men's tournament

Julian Amado Azaad (born 26 December 1990) is an Argentine beach volleyball player. He competed in the 2020 Summer Olympics.
