= Chevrolet Beach Volleyball Centre =

Beach volleyball venue in Toronto, Canada

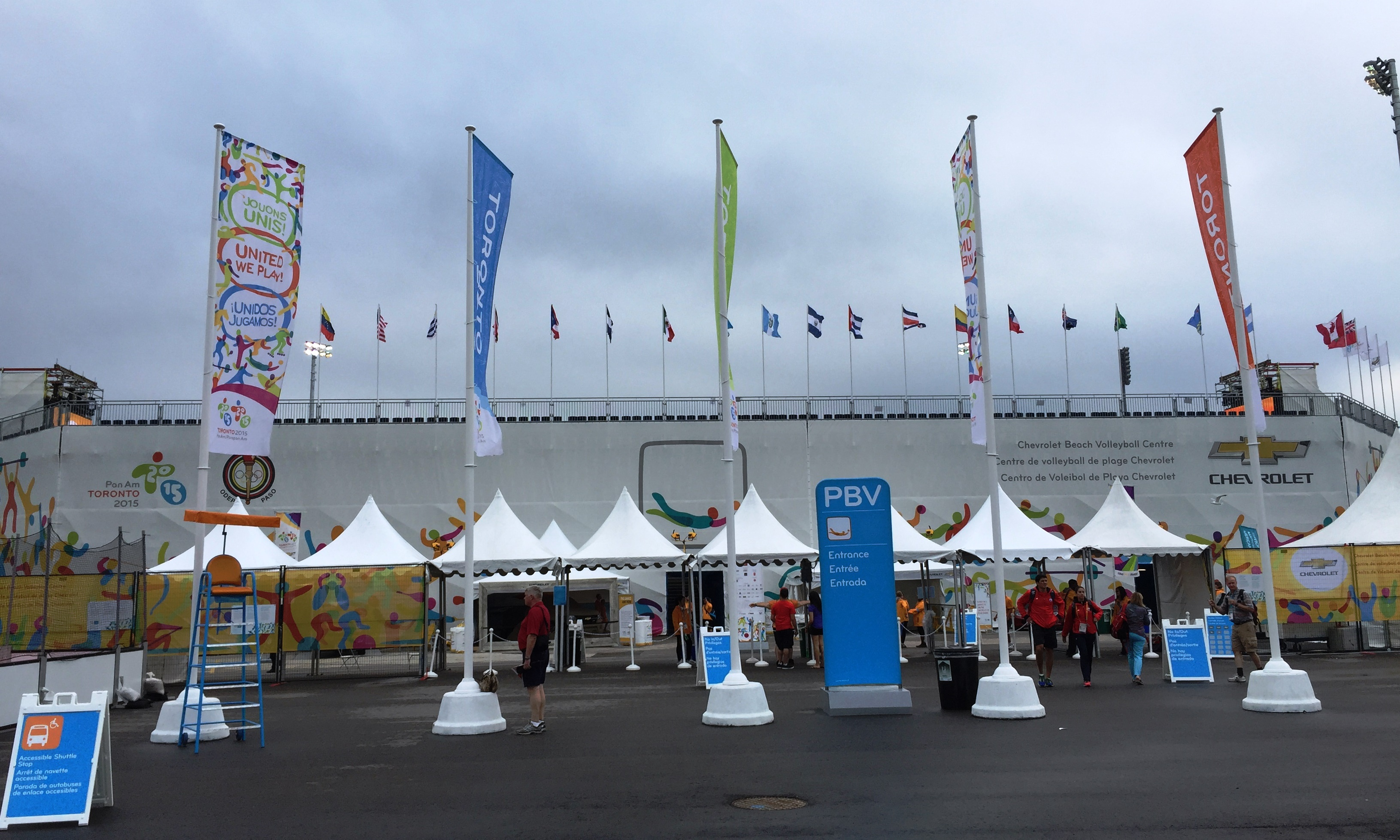
- Interactive map of Chevrolet Beach Volleyball Centre
- Location: 200 Princes Boulevard; Exhibition Place, Toronto, Ontario, Canada
- Coordinates: 43°37′55.9″N 79°25′02.5″W
- Owner: TO2015
- Capacity: 5,000

Construction
- Built: June–July 2015
- Opened: July 2015
- Demolished: July–August 2015

Tenant
- 2015 Pan American Games

The Chevrolet Beach Volleyball Centre was a temporary beach volleyball facility built at Exhibition Place (parking lot south of BMO Field) for the 2015 Pan American Games in Toronto, Ontario, Canada. The venue hosted the beach volleyball competitions at the games from July 13–21. A total of 3,000 metric tonnes of sand was used to build the temporary courts.

The courts were removed following the games in preparation for the Marketplace venue for the 2015 Canadian National Exhibition.

== Photo gallery ==
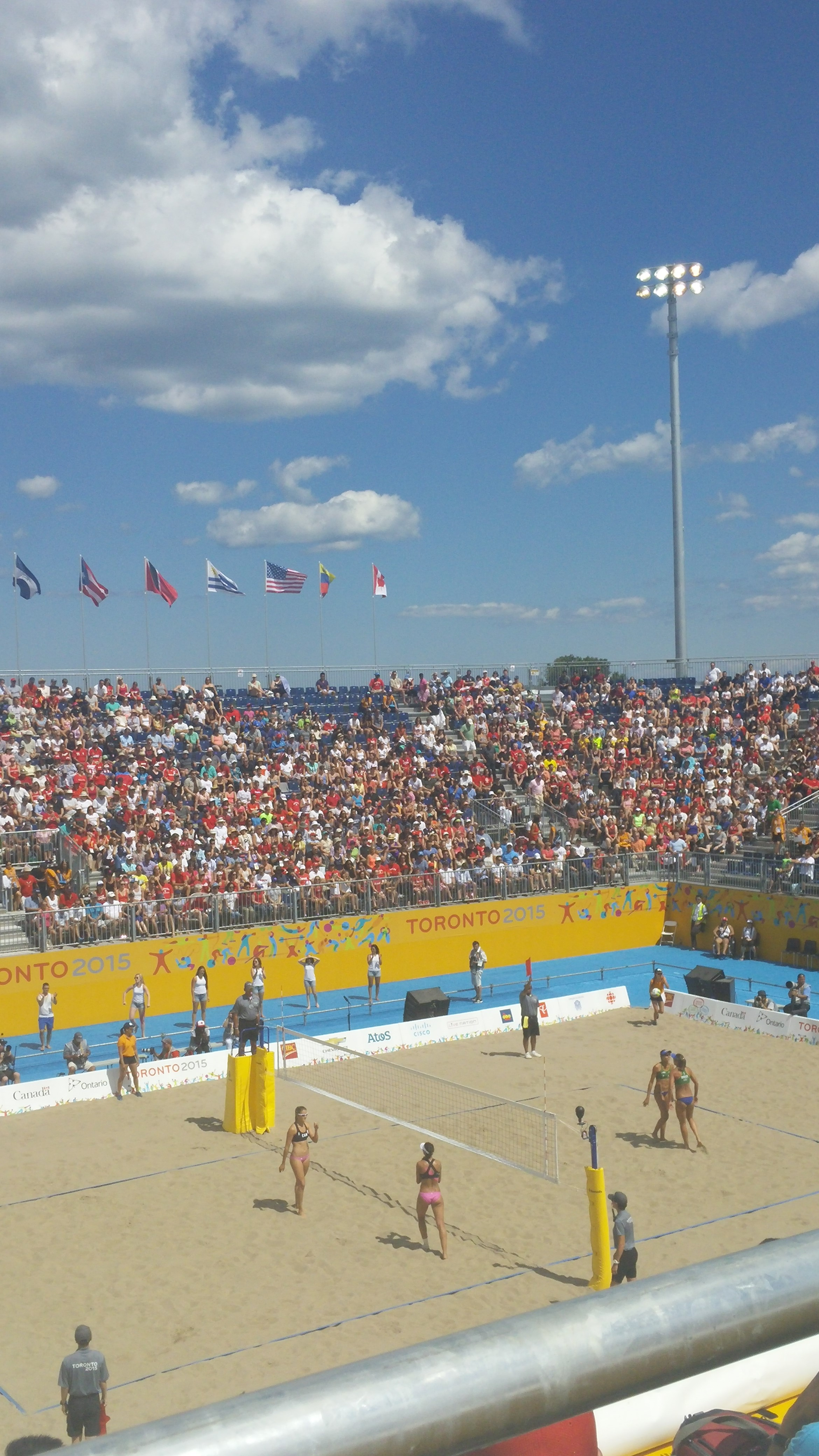
Centre Court

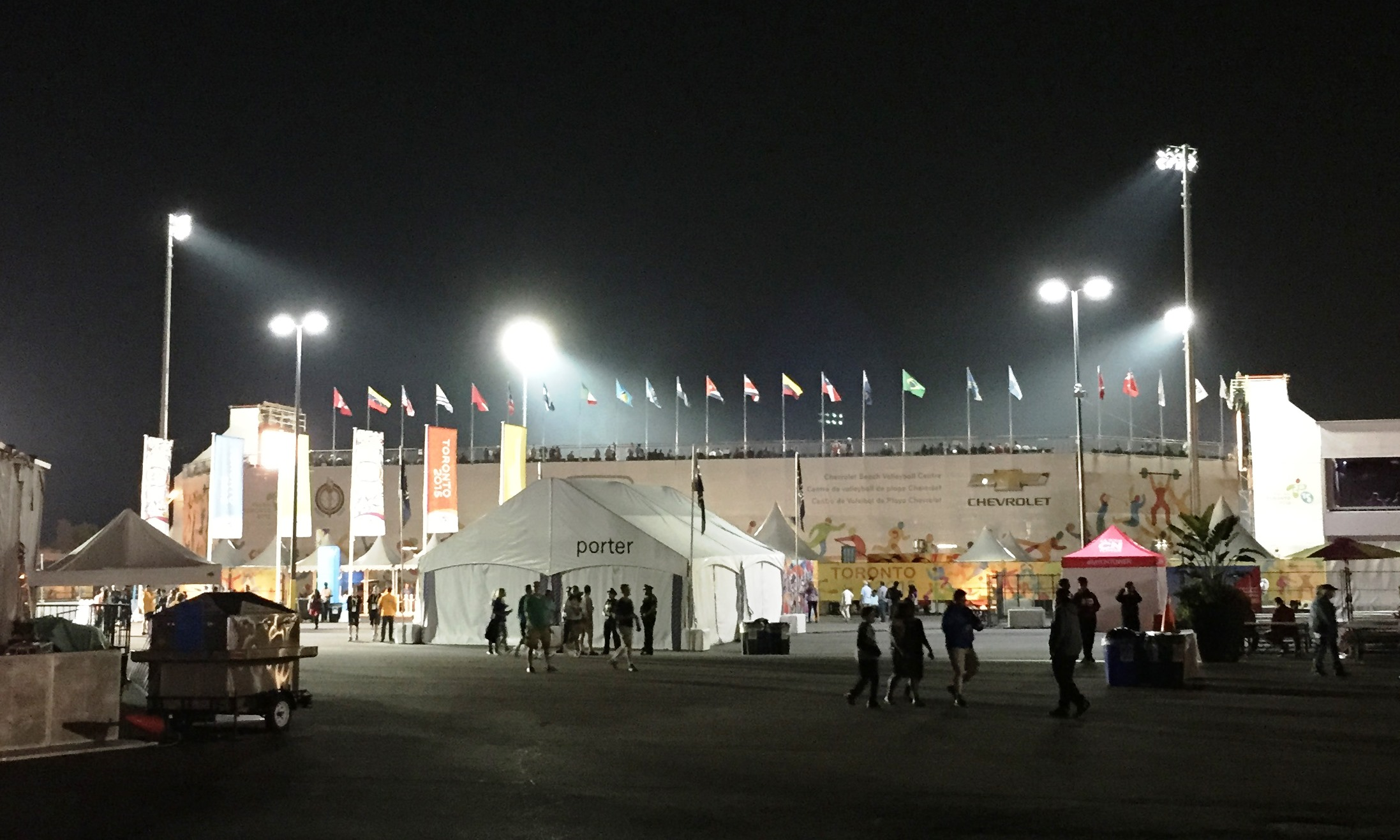
Centre at night in Pan Am Park

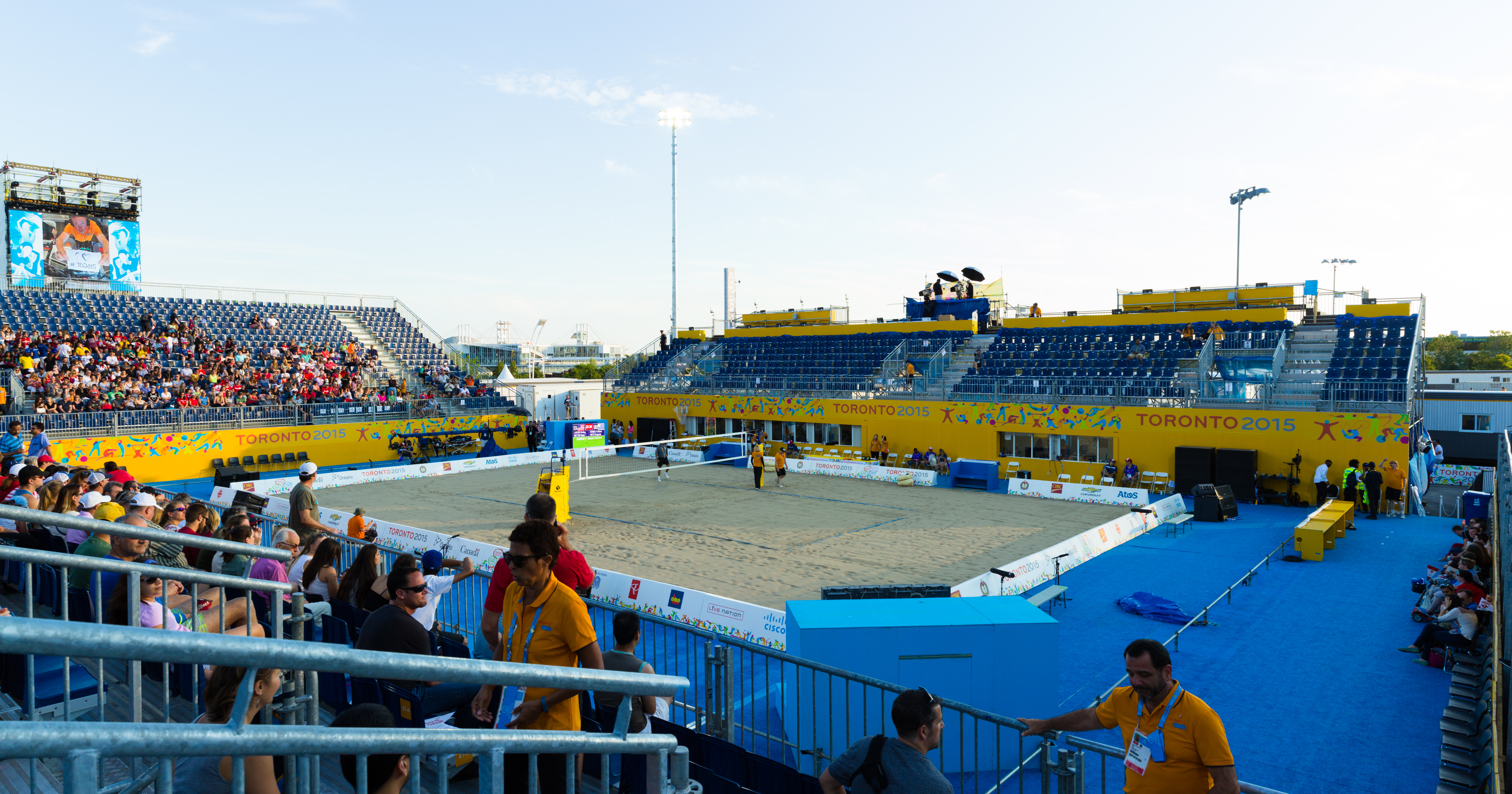
Centre Court
