= Carolina Horta =

Brazilian beach volleyball player (born 1992)

Personal information
- Born: 20 August 1992 (age 33)
- Height: 5 ft 11 in (180 cm)

Sport
- Country: Brazil
Medal record
Pan American Games
| Bronze medal – third place | 2015 Toronto | Beach volleyball |
| Bronze medal – third place | 2019 Lima | Beach volleyball |

Carolina Horta (born 20 August 1992) is a Brazilian beach volleyball player.

Horta won bronze medals at the Pan American Games in 2015, alongside Liliane Maestrini, and 2019, alongside Angela Lavalle.
