= Thais Ferreira =

Brazilian activist and politician

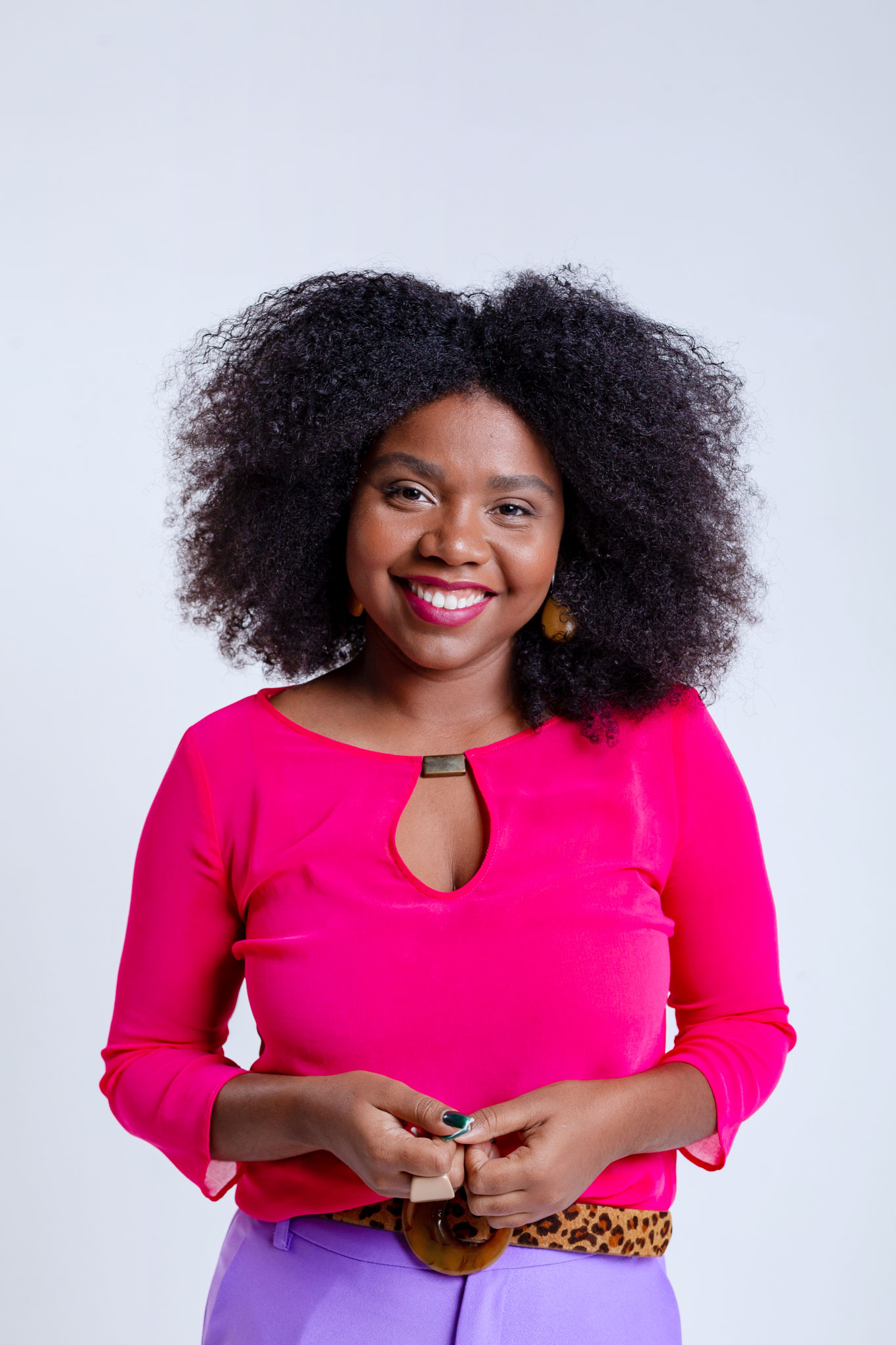

Councilwoman for Rio de Janeiro
- Incumbent
- Assumed office 1 January 2021

Personal details
- Born: Thais de Souza Ferreira; 19 September 1988 (age 38) Rio de Janeiro, Brazil
- Party: PSOL
- Education: Massachusetts Institute of Technology

Thais de Souza Ferreira (born 19 September 1988) is a Brazilian community activist and politician who has been a councilwoman for the Municipal Chamber of the city of Rio de Janeiro since 2021. A community leader in the neighborhood of Irajá, in the North Zone, she entered politics with the encouragement of councilwoman Marielle Franco, who had been assassinated in March 2018, becoming a first substitute for the Socialism and Liberty Party (PSOL) in 2018.

== Biography ==
Ferreira was born in 1988 in Rio de Janeiro. She studied Innovation and Strategy at the Massachusetts Institute of Technology.

Ferreira ran for office for the first time during the 2018 elections. She was invited by Franco to join PSOL and was a candidate for the state assembly, being elected as a first substitute for the party coalition. In 2020, she was elected as a councilwoman in Rio de Janeiro. Among the 53 councilors elected to the municipal chamber in Rio de Janeiro in 2020, 20%, or 10 councilors, were women, Ferreira being among them. Of those within this group, only 4 were non-white.

Ferreira is one of the main voices that are critical of obstacles that exist with regards to Black women effectively participating in political party structures, including that of PSOL.

In 2021, the municipal chamber began to seek a more diverse council in comparison to the previous council, with a new initiative that set aside 35% of vacancies to include women, people younger than 29, and, most importantly, Black and racially mixed people, with the goal of having these groups represent 30% of the council. Ferreira is considered one of the principal voices in this movement. She also participated in the A Tenda das candidatas project in 2020, a collective which seeks to promote female candidates for office.

Ferreira, during her campaign for councilman, prioritized lowering infant mortality, combating racism, women's health and accessibility for all people to the city.

She participated in an initiative that brought together 14 city councilors from around the country to call for the postponement of the Exame Nacional do Ensino Médio in 2021, which was set to take place in January of that year, unless there was a guarantee of sanitary conditions before the testing period in response to the COVID-19 pandemic.

Ferreira recognized doctor and reality show participant Fred Nicácio as an honorary citizen of the city of Rio de Janeiro for him confronting sensitive topics such as racism and religious intolerance on the show, after having received the Medalha Pedro Ernesto after his participation on Big Brother Brasil. According to her, the award is known for being "the greatest award conceded by the Municipal Chamber of Rio".

== Activism ==
In 2017, Ferreira created the Mãe&Mais organization, where she had become one of the main activists that sought to improve health outcomes for women in obstetric care settings. At age 29, she had suffered the loss of her child due to medical negligence and started the organization due to this experience. The organization set up a model of women's health clinics, providing health services with a welcoming and humanizing mindset in Rio de Janeiro. The initiative is open to the public for mothers, between the ages of 15 and 35, and children from birth to 6 years old. The organization has received funding from institutions such as the Brazil Foundation and Fundação Telefónica. It is run by health and education professionals, the majority of whom are Black women, and has already helped more than a thousand families. It has been viewed as a model in community projects targeting maternal health.

== Awards and recognition ==
- Ferreira was recognized as the founder of Mãe&Mais, a project recognized by Social Good Lab of Fundação Social Good Brasil in 2017.
- She was selected to participate and received a program scholarship from RenovaBR in 2018.
