= Pilar Mardones =

Chilean volleyball player (born 1989)

Personal information
- Nickname: Pili
- Nationality: Chilean
- Born: 16 November 1989 (age 36)
- Height: 174 cm (69 in)
- Weight: 62 kg (137 lb)
- Spike: 280 cm (110 in)
- Block: 272 cm (107 in)

Volleyball information
- Position: outside hitter
- Number: 7 (national team)

Career
Years	Teams
2011	(Chile) Club Manquehue

National team
2011	Chile

Pilar Mardones (born 16 November 1989) is a professional Chilean female beach volleyball player, playing as an outside hitter. She was part of the Chile women's national volleyball team.

She participated at the 2011 Women's Pan-American Volleyball Cup, and at the 2015 Pan American Games. On club level she played for Boston College in 2011.
