= María Eugenia Nieto =

Uruguayan beach volleyball player (born 1986)

Personal information
- Born: 15 January 1986 (age 39); Montevideo, Uruguay

Sport
- Sport: Beach volleyball

María Eugenia Nieto (born 15 January 1986 in Montevideo) is a Uruguayan beach volleyball player.

She is the first Uruguayan along with Fabiana Gómez to play a Beach Volleyball World Cup.

== Results ==
Pan American Games

- 2015: TBD

Beach Volleyball World Championships

- 2015: 37th

FIVB Beach Volleyball World Tour

- Paraná Open 2014: 25th
