= Fabiana Gómez =

Uruguayan beach volleyball and tennis player

Personal information
- Born: 8 December 1986 (age 38); Montevideo, Uruguay

Sport
- Sport: Beach volleyball

Fabiana Gómez (born 8 December 1986, in Montevideo) is a Uruguayan beach volleyball player and former tennis player.

She is the first Uruguayan along with María Eugenia Nieto to play a Beach Volleyball World Cup.

== Results ==
Pan American Games

- 2011: 6th
- 2015: TBD

Beach Volleyball World Championships

- 2015: 37th
