= Cerrito, Entre Ríos =

Coordinates: 31°35′S 60°04′W

Cerrito (Entre Ríos)
- Municipality and village
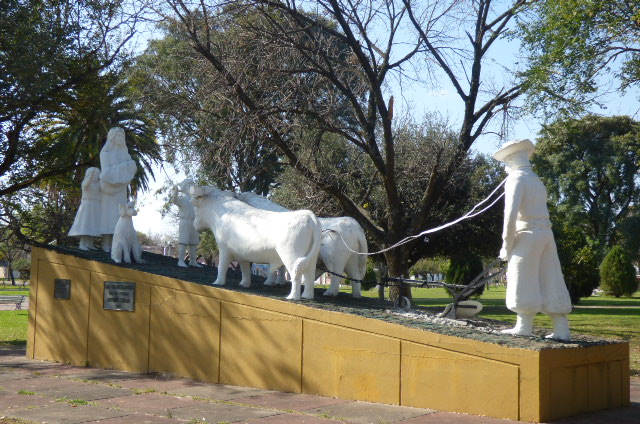
- Interactive map of Cerrito (Entre Ríos)
- Country: Argentina
- Province: Entre Ríos Province
- Time zone: UTC−3 (ART)

Cerrito (Entre Ríos) is a village and municipality in Entre Ríos Province in north-eastern Argentina.
