= Georgina Klug =

Argentine beach volleyball player (born 1984)

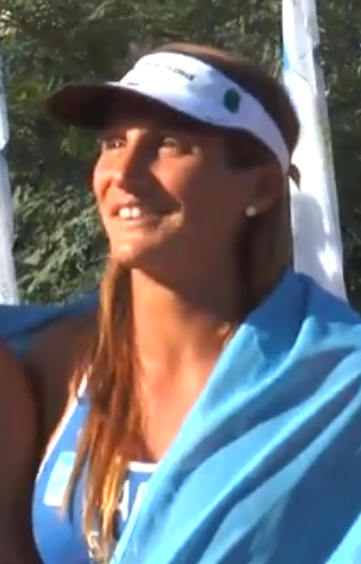
- After winning a tournament in Tucumán in 2014

Personal information
- Born: 11 June 1984 (age 42) Santa Fe, Argentina
- Height: 1.72 m (5 ft 8 in)
- Weight: 64 kg (141 lb)

Sport
- Country: Argentina
- Sport: Beach volleyball
Medal record
Women's beach volleyball
Representing Argentina
Pan American Games
| Gold medal – first place | 2015 Toronto | Beach volleyball |

Georgina Klug (born 11 June 1984) is an Argentine beach volleyball player. Prior to 2011, she played indoor volleyball, being even captain of Argentina women's national volleyball team.

Georgina won the gold medal at the 2015 Pan American Games with Ana Gallay. She represented her country at the 2016 Summer Olympics.
