= María Zonta =

Argentine beach volleyball player (born 1989)

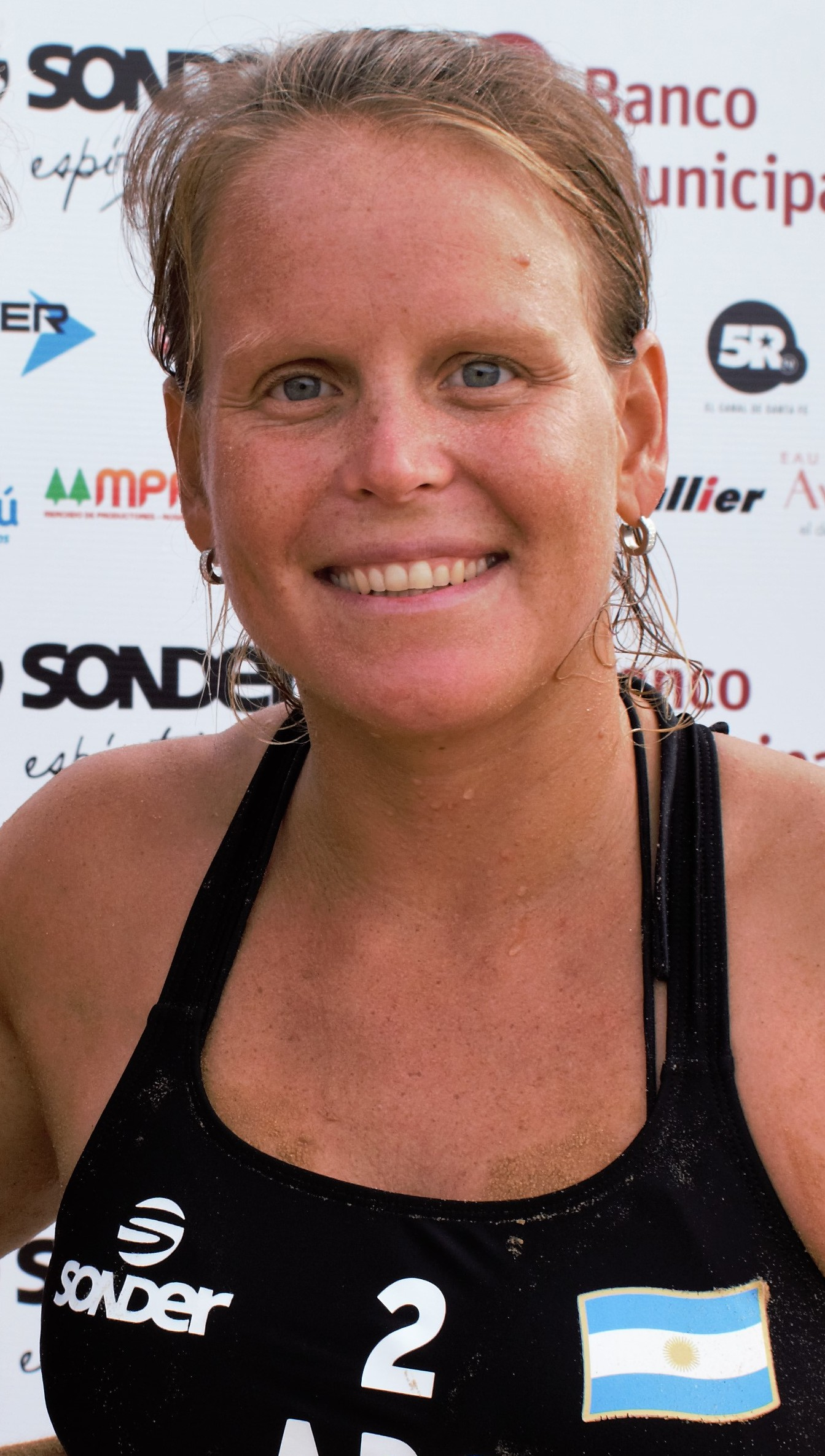
- Zonta at the 2019 South American Beach Games

Personal information
- Full name: María Virginia Zonta
- Nationality: Argentina
- Born: 30 September 1989 (age 37)

Beach volleyball information
Teammate
Ana Gallay

María Virginia Zonta (born 30 September 1989 in Santa Fe) is an Argentine beach volleyball player. In 2012, she played with Ana Gallay. They participated in the 2012 Summer Olympics tournament and lost their three pool matches.
