= Ana Gallay =

Argentine beach volleyball player (born 1986)

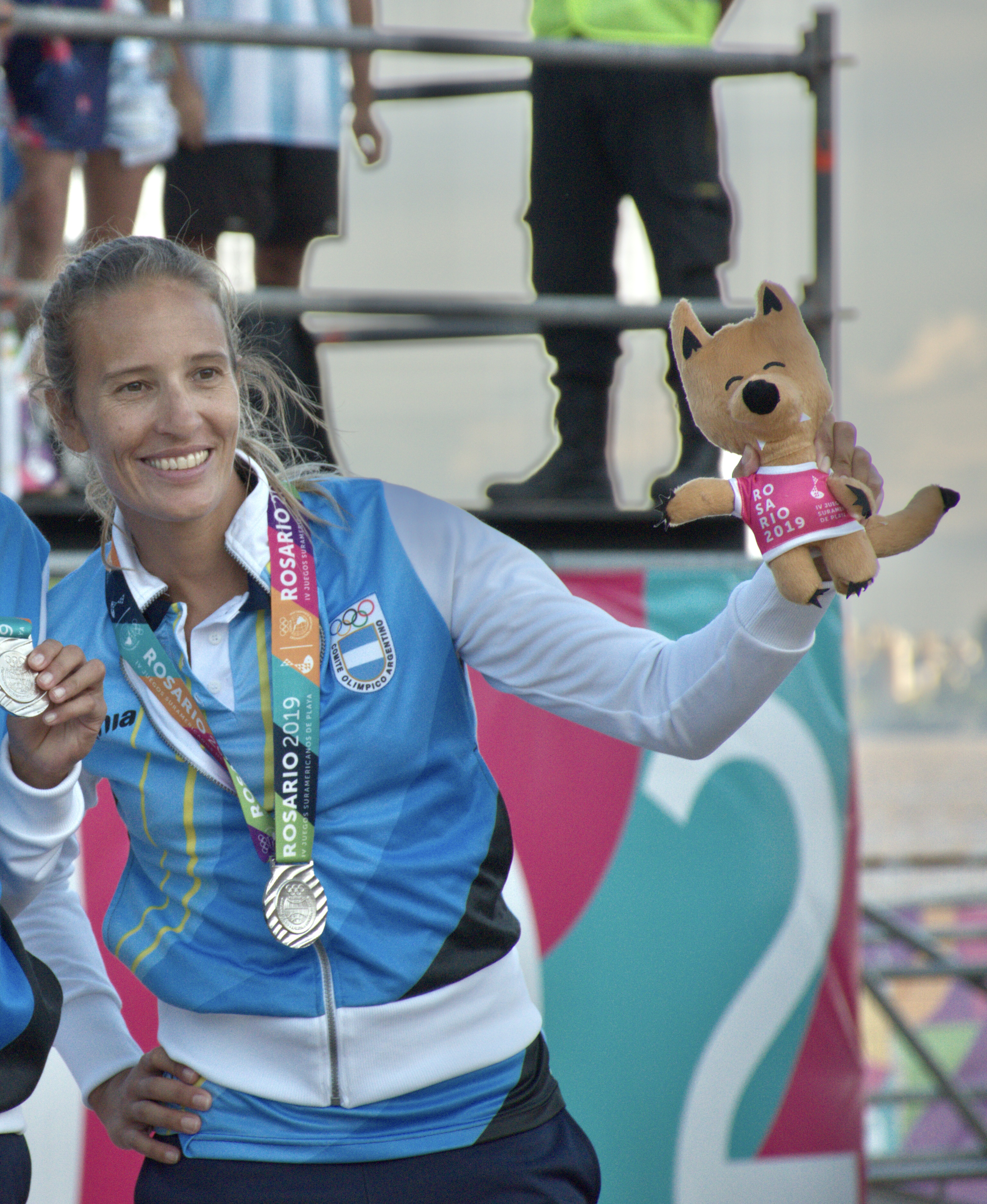
- Gallay during the 2019 South American Beach Games

Personal information
- Full name: Ana María Gallay
- Born: 16 January 1986 (age 40); Nogoyá, Argentina
- Height: 174 cm (5 ft 9 in)
- Weight: 66 kg (146 lb)
Honours
Women's beach volleyball
Representing Argentina
Pan American Games
Gold medal – first place	2015 Toronto	Beach
Silver medal – second place	2019 Lima	Beach

Ana María Gallay (born 16 January 1986) is an Argentine beach volleyball player. She competed at the 2020 Summer Olympics.

== Life ==
She was born in Nogoyá, Entre Ríos Province, Argentina.

In 2012, she played with Virginia Zonta. The pair participated in the 2012 Summer Olympics tournament and lost their three pool matches. Ana won the gold medal at the 2015 Pan American Games with Georgina Klug. She represented her country at the 2016 Summer Olympics.
