= 2018–2020 CEV Beach Volleyball Continental Cup =

The 2018–2020 CEV Beach Volleyball Continental Cup were a beach volleyball double-gender event. Teams representing European countries were split into groups of four, where an elimination bracket determined the two teams to advance to the next stage from the sub-zones. The winners of the event qualified for the Volleyball at the 2020 Summer Olympics.

== Men ==
=== Phase 1 ===
==== Pool A ====
Pool A was contested in Novi Sad, Serbia.

Semifinals
8 June 2019
Serbia	2
San Marino	0
8 June 2019
Belarus	2
Romania	0
Fourth place 9 June
San Marino	0
Romania	2

Final
8 June 2019
Serbia	2
Belarus	0
Second place 9 June 2019
Belarus	2
Romania	0

- Serbia and Belarus qualified to the Phase 2.

==== Pool B ====
Pool B was contested in London, England.

25 May 2019; 11:40	Gregory – Batrane (England)	2–0	(Armenia) Asmaryan – Ghasaboghlyan	Feel Good Too Centre Gym, London
25 May 2019; 11:40	(21–9, 21–9)			Feel Good Too Centre Gym, London

25 May 2019; 12:30	Ja. Bello – Smith (England)	2–0	(Armenia) Balabekyan – Simoni	Feel Good Too Centre Gym, London
25 May 2019; 12:30	(21–18, 21–17)			Feel Good Too Centre Gym, London

25 May 2019; 16:20	Heidrich – Gerson (Switzerland)	2–0	(Armenia) Asmaryan – Ghasaboghlyan	Feel Good Too Centre Gym, London
25 May 2019; 16:20	(21–5, 21–6)			Feel Good Too Centre Gym, London

25 May 2019; 16:20	Beeler – Krattiger (Switzerland)	2–0	(Armenia) Balabekyan – Simoni	Feel Good Too Centre Gym, London
25 May 2019; 16:20	(21–6, 21–11)			Feel Good Too Centre Gym, London

26 May 2019; 12:00	Heidrich – Gerson (Switzerland)	2–0	(England) Ja. Bello – Smith	Feel Good Too Centre Gym, London
26 May 2019; 12:00	(21–17, 21–14)			Feel Good Too Centre Gym, London

26 May 2019; 13:00	Beeler – Krattiger (Switzerland)	2–0	(England) Gregory – Batrane	Feel Good Too Centre Gym, London
26 May 2019; 13:00	(22–20, 23–21)			Feel Good Too Centre Gym, London

- Switzerland and England qualified to the Phase 2.

==== Pool C ====
Pool C was contested in Bettystown, Ireland.

Semifinals
1 June 2019
Lithuania	2
Scotland	0
1 June 2019
Ukraine	2
Ireland	0
Fourth place 2 June 2019
Scotland	1
Ireland	2

Final
1 June 2019
Lithuania	2
Ukraine	1
Second place 2 June 2019
Ukraine	2
Ireland	0

- Lithuania and Ukraine qualified to the Phase 2.

==== Pool D ====
Pool D was contested in Schinias, Greece.

Semifinals
22 June 2019
Turkey	2
Kosovo	0
22 June 2019
Sweden	2
Greece	0
Fourth place 23 June 2019
Kosovo	0
Greece	2

Final
22 June 2019
Turkey	2
Sweden	0
Second place 23 June 2019
Sweden	2
Greece	0

- Turkey and Sweden qualified to the Phase 2.

==== Pool E ====
Pool E was contested in Portorož, Slovenia.

Semifinals
11 May 2019
Czech Republic	2
Israel	0
11 May 2019
Slovenia	2
Northern Ireland	0
Fourth place 12 May 2019
Israel	2
Northern Ireland	0

Final
11 May 2019
Czech Republic	2
Slovenia	1
Second place 12 May 2019
Slovenia	2
Israel	0

- Czech Republic and Slovenia qualified to the Phase 2.

==== Pool F ====
Pool F was contested in Batumi, Georgia.

Semifinals
22 June 2019
Belgium	2
Georgia	0
22 June 2019
Hungary	1
Slovakia	2
Fourth place 23 June 2019
Georgia	0
Hungary	2

Final
23 June 2019
Belgium	2
Slovakia	0
Second place 23 June 2019
Slovakia	2
Hungary	1

- Belgium and Slovakia qualified to the Phase 2.

==== Pool G ====
Pool G was contested in Umag, Croatia.

Semifinals
22 June 2019
Estonia	2
Albania	0
22 June 2019
Denmark	2
Croatia	0
Fourth place 23 June 2019
Albania	0
Croatia	2

Final
22 June 2019
Estonia	1
Denmark	2
Second place 23 June 2019
Estonia	2
Croatia	0

- Denmark and Estonia qualified to the Phase 2.

==== Pool H ====
Pool H was contested in Larnaka, Cyprus.

Semifinals
8 June 2019
France	2
Moldova	0
8 June 2019
Finland	2
Cyprus	0
Fourth place 8 June
Moldova	1
Cyprus	2

Final
8 June 2019
France	1
Finland	2
Second place 9 June 2019
France	2
Cyprus	0

- Finland and France qualified to the Phase 2.

== Women ==
=== Ranking ===
Organizer of the Final (3rd phase), Netherlands, qualifies directly to the 3rd Phase.

The top 8 in CEV Country Ranking as of 30 September 2018 qualified to the 2nd Phase.

- Czech Republic, Germany, Switzerland, Russia, Finland, Poland, Spain and Italy

=== Phase 1 ===
Pool A was contested in Novi Sad, Serbia.

Semifinals
8 June 2019
Sweden	2
Albania	0
8 June 2019
Israel	1
Serbia	2
Fourth place 9 June
Albania	0
Israel	2

Final
8 June 2019
Sweden	1
Serbia	2
Second place 9 June 2019
Sweden	2
Israel	1

- Serbia and Sweden qualified to the Phase 2.

==== Pool B ====
Pool B was contested in London, England.

Semifinals
25 May 2019
France	2
Northern Ireland	0
25 May 2019
Belarus	2
England	1
Fourth place 26 May 2019
England	2
Northern Ireland	0

Final
25 May 2019
France	2
Belarus	0
Second place 26 May 2019
Belarus	2
England	1

- France and Belarus qualified to the Phase 2.

==== Pool C ====
Pool C was contested in Bettystown, Ireland.

Semifinals
1 June 2019
Slovakia	2
Ireland	1
1 June 2019
Denmark	2
Estonia	0
Fourth place 2 June
Estonia	2
Ireland	0

Final
1 June 2019
Slovakia	2
Denmark	1
Second place 2 June 2019
Denmark	0
Estonia	2

- Slovakia and Estonia qualified to the Phase 2.

==== Pool D ====
Pool D was contested in Schinias, Greece.

Semifinals
22 June 2019
Austria	2
Kosovo	0
22 June 2019
Greece	2
Portugal	0
Fourth place 23 June 2019
Kosovo	0
Portugal	2

Final
22 June 2019
Austria	1
Greece	2
Second place 23 June 2019
Austria	2
Portugal	0

- Greece and Austria qualified to the Phase 2.

==== Pool E ====
Pool E was contested in Portorož, Slovenia.

11 May 2019; 13:10	Kravčenoka – Graudiņa (Latvia)	2–0	(Bulgaria) Kyoseva – Petrova	Portorož Beach, Portorož
11 May 2019; 13:10	(21–10, 21–3)			Portorož Beach, Portorož

11 May 2019; 14:00	Lece – Ozoliņa (Latvia)	2–0	(Bulgaria) Mishonova – Duleva	Portorož Beach, Portorož
11 May 2019; 14:00	(21–8, 21–12)			Portorož Beach, Portorož

12 May 2019; 09:00	Jančar – Kotnik (Slovenia)	2–0	(Bulgaria) Kyoseva – Petrova	Portorož Beach, Portorož
12 May 2019; 09:00	(21–13, 21–8)			Portorož Beach, Portorož

12 May 2019; 09:50	Skarlovnik – Pešić (Slovenia)	2–0	(Bulgaria) Mishonova – Duleva	Portorož Beach, Portorož
12 May 2019; 09:50	(21–14, 21–13)			Portorož Beach, Portorož

12 May 2019; 15:00	Kravčenoka – Graudiņa (Latvia)	2–0	(Slovenia) Skarlovnik – Pešić	Portorož Beach, Portorož
12 May 2019; 15:00	(21–12, 21–16)			Portorož Beach, Portorož

12 May 2019; 15:50	Lece – Ozoliņa (Latvia)	2–0	(Slovenia) Jančar – Kotnik	Portorož Beach, Portorož
12 May 2019; 15:50	(22–20, 21–13)			Portorož Beach, Portorož

- Latvia and Slovenia qualified to the Phase 2.

==== Pool F ====
Pool F was contested in Batumi, Georgia.

Semifinals
22 June 2019
Norway	2
Georgia	0
22 June 2019
Turkey	2
Hungary	1
Fourth place 23 June 2019
Georgia	0
Hungary	2

Final
23 June 2019
Norway	2
Turkey	0
Second place 23 June 2019
Turkey	2
Hungary	1

- Norway and Turkey qualified to the Phase 2.

==== Pool G ====
Pool G was contested in Umag, Croatia.

Date	Time		Score		Set 1	Set 2	Set 3	Total	Report
22 Jun	09:00	Andriukaitytė–Vitkauskaitė (Lithuania)	2–0	(Croatia) Radanović–Vrbanc	21–13	21–13		42–26	
22 Jun	10:00	Dumbauskaitė–Zobnina (Lithuania)	2–0	(Croatia) Drviš–Bečić	21–8	21–9		42–17	
22 Jun	15:00	Vaida–Ordean (Romania)	2–0	(Croatia) Radanović–Vrbanc	21–19	22–20		43–39	
22 Jun	16:00	Răileanu–Stanciu (Romania)	2–0	(Croatia) Drviš–Bečić	22–20	21–12		43–32	
23 Jun	11:00	Andriukaitytė–Vitkauskaitė (Lithuania)	2–0	(Romania) Răileanu–Stanciu	21–16	22–20		43–36	
23 Jun	12:00	Dumbauskaitė–Zobnina (Lithuania)	2–1	(Romania) Vaida–Ordean	13–21	21–19	15–10	49–50	

- Lithuania and Romania qualified to the Phase 2.

==== Pool H ====
Pool H was contested in Larnaka, Cyprus.

Semifinals
8 June 2019
Ukraine	2
Moldova	0
8 June 2019
Cyprus	2
Scotland	0
Fourth place 8 June
Moldova	2
Scotland	0

Final
8 June 2019
Ukraine	2
Cyprus	0
Second place 9 June 2019
Cyprus	2
Moldova	0

- Ukraine and Cyprus qualified to the Phase 2.

=== Phase 2 ===
Rank	Pool 1 (Turkey) İzmir	Pool 2 (Spain) Madrid	Pool 3 (Austria) Baden
1	Greece	Russia	Germany
2	Poland	France	Austria
3	Finland	Spain	Italy
4	Czech Republic	Switzerland	Ukraine
5	Slovenia	Lithuania	Norway
6	Turkey	Cyprus	Latvia
7	Serbia	Estonia	Sweden
8	Belarus	Romania	Slovakia

=== Final round ===
- Host: The Hague, Netherlands

==== Bracket ====
Round of 16
23 June 2021
Netherlands	2
Estonia	0
23 June 2021
Finland	0
Spain	2
23 June 2021
Austria	2
Slovenia	0
23 June 2021
France	0
Norway	2
23 June 2021
Russia	2
Cyprus	1
23 June 2021
Italy	0
Ukraine	2
23 June 2021
Greece	2
Lithuania	0
23 June 2021
Poland	2
Czech Republic	1

Quarterfinals
24 June 2021
Netherlands	2
Spain	1
24 June 2021
Austria	0
Norway	2
24 June 2021
Russia	2
Ukraine	0
24 June 2021
Greece	2
Poland	1

Semifinals
25 June 2021
Netherlands	2
Norway	1
25 June 2021
Russia	2
Greece	0

Final
26 June 2021
Netherlands	2
Russia	1

==== Round of 16 ====
Date	Time		Score		Set 1	Set 2	Set 3	Total	Report
23 Jun	17:00	Van Iersel–Ypma (Netherlands)	2–0	(Estonia) Kure-Pohhomov–Pikk	21–14	21–16		42–30	Report
23 Jun	18:00	Schoon–Stam (Netherlands)	2–0	(Estonia) Hollas–Soomets	21–10	21–10		42–20	Report
23 Jun	08:00	Dabizha–Rudykh (Russia)	2–0	(Cyprus) Nyström–Gusarova	21–19	21–19		42–38	Report
23 Jun	08:50	Bocharova–Voronina (Russia)	0–2	(Cyprus) Angelopoulou–Konstantopoulou	16–21	20–22		36–43	Report
23 Jun	13:00	Dabizha–Rudykh (Russia)	2–0	(Cyprus) Angelopoulou–Konstantopoulou	21–14	21–8		42–22	Report
23 Jun	09:40	Arvaniti–Karagkouni (Greece)	2–0	(Lithuania) Andriukaitytė–Povilaitytė	21–19	21–16		42–35	Report
23 Jun	10:30	Baka–Klepkou (Greece)	2–1	(Lithuania) Dumbauskaitė–Grudzinskaitė	21–19	16–21	15–10	52–50	Report
23 Jun	08:00	Schützenhöfer–Plesiutschnig (Austria)	2–0	(Slovenia) N. Lovšin–Morgan	21–11	21–13		42–24	Report
23 Jun	08:50	N. Strauss–T. Strauss (Austria)	2–0	(Slovenia) T. Lovšin–Kotnik	21–13	21–17		42–30	Report
23 Jun	08:00	Jupiter–Chamereau (France)	1–2	(Norway) Helland-Hansen–Hjortland	21–19	14–21	8–15	43–55	Report
23 Jun	08:50	Placette–Richard (France)	0–2	(Norway) Lunde–Olimstad	17–21	20–22		37–43	Report
23 Jun	09:40	Wojtasik–Kociołek (Poland)	2–1	(Czech Republic) Williams–Štochlová	19–21	21–16	15–8	55–45	Report
23 Jun	10:30	Ceynowa–Łodej (Poland)	0–2	(Czech Republic) Kubíčková–Kvapilová	17–21	18–21		35–42	Report
23 Jun	13:50	Wojtasik–Kociołek (Poland)	2–0	(Czech Republic) Kubíčková–Kvapilová	21–12	21–16		42–28	Report
23 Jun	09:40	Scampoli–Bianchin (Italy)	0–2	(Ukraine) In. Makhno–Ir. Makhno	19–21	17–21		36–42	Report
23 Jun	10:30	They–Breidenbach (Italy)	0–2	(Ukraine) Lunina–Davidova	19–21	19–21		38–42	Report
23 Jun	11:20	Sinisalo–Prihti (Finland)	1–2	(Spain) Soria–Carro	21–18	9–21	13–15	43–54	Report
23 Jun	12:10	Lehtonen–Ahtiainen (Finland)	0–2	(Spain) Fernández–Lobato	13–21	18–21		31–42	Report

==== Quarterfinals ====
Date	Time		Score		Set 1	Set 2	Set 3	Total	Report
24 Jun	09:30	Arvaniti–Karagkouni (Greece)	2–0	(Poland) Ceynowa–Łodej	21–10	21–19		42–29	Report
24 Jun	10:30	Baka–Klepkou (Greece)	0–2	(Poland) Wojtasik–Kociołek	11–21	12–21		23–42	Report
24 Jun	14:30	Arvaniti–Karagkouni (Greece)	2–1	(Poland) Wojtasik–Kociołek	22–20	13–21	17–15	52–56	Report
24 Jun	10:30	Dabizha–Rudykh (Russia)	2–1	(Ukraine) In. Makhno–Ir. Makhno	17–21	21–17	15–11	53–49	Report
24 Jun	12:30	Bocharova–Voronina (Russia)	2–0	(Ukraine) Lunina–Davidova	21–13	21–19		42–32	Report
24 Jun	09:30	Schützenhöfer–Plesiutschnig (Austria)	1–2	(Norway) Helland-Hansen–Hjortland	18–21	21–16	14–16	53–53	Report
24 Jun	11:30	N. Strauss–T. Strauss (Austria)	0–2	(Norway) Lunde–Olimstad	17–21	20–22		37–43	Report
24 Jun	17:00	Van Iersel–Ypma (Netherlands)	0–2	(Spain) Soria–Carro	19–21	21–23		40–44	Report
24 Jun	18:00	Schoon–Stam (Netherlands)	2–0	(Spain) Fernández–Lobato	21–10	21–10		42–20	Report
24 Jun	21:30	Schoon–Stam (Netherlands)	2–0	(Spain) Fernández–Soria	21–17	21–12		42–29	Report

==== Semifinals ====
Date	Time		Score		Set 1	Set 2	Set 3	Total	Report
25 Jun	09:30	Dabizha–Rudykh (Russia)	2–0	(Greece) Baka–Klepkou	21–15	21–15		42–30	Report
25 Jun	12:30	Bocharova–Voronina (Russia)	2–1	(Greece) Arvaniti–Karagkouni	19–21	21–17	15–10	55–48	Report
25 Jun	17:00	Van Iersel–Ypma (Netherlands)	2–1	(Norway) Helland-Hansen–Hjortland	15–21	21–17	17–15	53–53	Report
25 Jun	18:00	Schoon–Stam (Netherlands)	0–2	(Norway) Lunde–Olimstad	20–22	15–21		35–43	Report
25 Jun	21:30	Schoon–Stam (Netherlands)	2–1	(Norway) Lunde–Olimstad	21–18	18–21	16–14	55–53	Report

==== Final ====
Date	Time		Score		Set 1	Set 2	Set 3	Total	Report
26 Jun	12:00	Van Iersel–Ypma (Netherlands)	0–2	(Russia) Bocharova–Voronina	18–21	15–21		33–42	Report
26 Jun	13:15	Schoon–Stam (Netherlands)	2–0	(Russia) Dabizha–Rudykh	21–14	21–13		42–27	Report
26 Jun	18:45	Schoon–Stam (Netherlands)	2–1	(Russia) Bocharova–Voronina	21–15	15–21	15–11	51–47	Report
