= Netherlands at the 2022 European Championships =

in (Germany) Munich 11 August 2022 – 22 August 2022
- Competitors: 160 in 11 sports
- Medals Ranked 7th: Gold 9 Silver 7 Bronze 12 Total 28

European Championships appearances
- 2018; 2022

The Netherlands competed at the 2022 European Championships in Munich from 11–22 August 2022.

== Medallists ==
Medal	Name	Sport	Event	Date
Gold	Harrie Lavreysen; Roy van den Berg; Jeffrey Hoogland	Cycling	Men's team sprint	12 August
Gold	Karolien Florijn	Rowing	Women's single sculls	14 August
Gold	Melvin Twellaar	Rowing	Men's single sculls	14 August
Gold	Fabio Jakobsen	Cycling	Men's road race	14 August
Gold	Jessica Schilder	Athletics	Women's shot put	15 August
Gold	Femke Bol	Athletics	Women's 400 metres	16 August
Gold	Femke Bol	Athletics	Women's 400 metres hurdles	19 August
Gold	Eveline Saalberg; Lieke Klaver; Lisanne de Witte; Femke Bol	Athletics	Women's 4 × 400 metres relay	20 August
Gold	Lorena Wiebes	Cycling	Women's road race	21 August
Silver	Kyra Lamberink; Hetty van der Wouw; Shanne Braspennincx	Cycling	Women's team sprint	12 August
Silver	Ralf Rienks; Ruben Knab; Sander de Graaf; Rik Rienks	Rowing	Men's coxless four	13 August
Silver	Nika Vos; Tessa Dullemans; Ilse Kolkman; Bente Paulis	Rowing	Women's quadruple sculls	13 August
Silver	Roos de Jong; Laila Youssifou	Rowing	Women's double sculls	13 August
Silver	Nicolas van Sprang; Lennart van Lierop; Abe Wiersma; Jacob van de Kerkhof; Michiel Mantel; Mick Makker; Guus Mollee; Guillaume Krommenhoek; Dieuwke Fetter	Rowing	Men's eight	13 August
Silver	Ellen van Dijk	Cycling	Women's individual time trial	17 August
Silver	Loran de Munck	Gymnastics	Men's pommel horse	21 August
Bronze	Vincent Hoppezak	Cycling	Men's points race	12 August
Bronze	Ymkje Clevering; Veronique Meester	Rowing	Women's coxless pair	13 August
Bronze	Mylene de Zoete	Cycling	Women's elimination race	13 August
Bronze	Roy Eefting	Cycling	Men's scratch	13 August
Bronze	Martine Veldhuis	Rowing	Women's lightweight single sculls	14 August
Bronze	Benthe Boonstra; Laila Youssifou; Hermine Drenth; Marloes Oldenburg; Roos de Jong; Tinka Offereins; Ymkje Clevering; Veronique Meester; Aniek van Veenen	Rowing	Women's eight	14 August
Bronze	Nienke Brinkman	Athletics	Women's marathon	15 August
Bronze	Laurine van Riessen	Cycling	Women's sprint	15 August
Bronze	Jorinde van Klinken	Athletics	Women's shot put	15 August
Bronze	Riejanne Markus	Cycling	Women's individual time trial	17 August
Bronze	Anne Terpstra	Cycling	Women's cross-country	20 August
Bronze	Katja Stam; Raïsa Schoon	Beach volleyball	Women's tournament	20 August

== Competitors ==
The following is the list of number of competitors in the Championships:

Sport	Men	Women	Total
Athletics	26	32	58
Beach volleyball	8	6	14
Gymnastics (men and women)	5	5	10
Cycling BMX	2	0	2
Cycling mountain bike	1	4	5
Cycling road	8	8	16
Cycling track	10	11	21
Rowing	19	16	35
Sport climbing	5	3	8
Table tennis	0	4	4
Triathlon	3	4	7
Total	87	93	160

== Athletics ==
Netherlands has qualified 27 male and 34 female athletes.

=== Men ===
Track and road events

Athlete	Event	Heat		Semifinal		Final	
Athlete	Event	Result	Rank	Result	Rank	Result	Rank
Joris van Gool	100 m	10.45	14	did not advance			
Taymir Burnet	200 m	20.48	2 Q	20.44	10	did not advance	
Liemarvin Bonevacia	400 m	Bye		45.40	3 Q	45.17	4
Jochem Dobber	400 m	46.36	22	did not advance			
Tony van Diepen	800 m	1:47.67	16 Q	1:47.64	6	did not advance	
Djoao Lobles	800 m	1:48.00	23	did not advance			
Mike Foppen	5000 m	—				13:27.93	5
Koen Smet	110 m hurdles	13.88	14	14.06	23	did not advance	
Ramsey Angela	400 m hurdles	49.51	5 Q	49.99	19	did not advance	
Nick Smidt	400 m hurdles	50.06	8 Q	50.29	20	did not advance	
Elvis Afrifa; Taymir Burnet; Joris van Gool; Raphael Bouju	4x100 m relay	38.83	6 Q	—		38.25	4
Isayah Boers; Liemarvin Bonevacia; Jochem Dobber; Ramsey Angela	4x400 m relay	3:01.57	3 Q	—		3:01.34	5
Tom Hendrikse	Marathon	—				2:19:21	40
Ronald Schröer	Marathon	—				2:19:40	42

Field events

Athlete	Event	Qualification		Final	
Athlete	Event	Result	Rank	Result	Rank
Douwe Amels	High jump	2.21	=5 q	NM	
Rutger Koppelaar	Pole vault	5.65	=1 q	5.75	4
Menno Vloon	Pole vault	5.65	9 q	NM	
Ruben Rolvink	Discus throw	60.12	19	did not advance	
Denzel Comenentia	Hammer throw	68.89	23	did not advance	

Combined events – Decathlon

Athlete	Event	100 m	LJ	SP	HJ	400 m	110H	DT	PV	JT	1500 m	Final	Rank
Sven Roosen	Result	10.83	7.14	14.13	1.84	47.69 SB	14.45	38.40	4.80	59.74	4:18.43	8021	10
Sven Roosen	Points	899	847	736	661	924	917	632	849	734	822	8021	10
Rik Taam	Result	10.76	7.29	13.97	1.93	47.61	DNS					DNF	
Rik Taam	Points	915	883	727	740	928	DNS					DNF	

=== Women ===
Track and road events

Athlete	Event	Heat		Semifinal		Final	
Athlete	Event	Result	Rank	Result	Rank	Result	Rank
Jamile Samuel	200 m	23.00	3 Q	23.13	8	did not advance	
Lieke Klaver	200 m	Bye		22.92	4 Q	22.88	5
Lieke Klaver	400 m	Bye		50.59	4 Q	50.56	6
Eveline Saalberg	400 m	51.81	6 Q	52.45	19	did not advance	
Femke Bol	400 m	Bye		50.60	5 Q	49.44	1st place, gold medalist(s)
Femke Bol	400 m hurdles	Bye		53.73	1 Q	52.67	1st place, gold medalist(s)
Maureen Koster	5000 m	—				15:03.29	4
Diane van Es	5000 m	—				15:26.44	13
Silke Jonkman	10,000 m	—				32:30.92	11
Jasmijn Lau	10,000 m	—				33:14.00	16
Maayke Tjin-A-Lim	100 m hurdles	13.26	4 Q	13.21	19	did not advance	
Nadine Visser	100 m hurdles	Bye		12.74	4 Q	12.75	4
Zoë Sedney	100 m hurdles	Bye		13.42	21	did not advance	
N'Ketia Seedo; Zoë Sedney; Minke Bisschops; Naomi Sedney	4×100 m relay	43.75	8 q	—		43.03	5
Andrea Bouma*; Lieke Klaver; Laura de Witte*; Lisanne de Witte; Femke Bol; Eveline Saalberg	4×400 m relay	3:25.84	3 Q	—		3:20.87	1st place, gold medalist(s)
Nienke Brinkman	Marathon	—				2:28:52	3rd place, bronze medalist(s)
Jill Holterman	Marathon	—				2:35:25 SB	21
Bo Ummels	Marathon	—				3:00:56	52 SB
Ruth van der Meijden	Marathon	—				DNF	
Nienke Brinkman; Jill Holterman; Bo Ummels; Ruth van der Meijden	Marathon Cup	—				8:05:13	8

Field events

Athlete	Event	Qualification		Final	
Athlete	Event	Result	Rank	Result	Rank
Britt Weerman	High jump	1.87	=5 q	1.93	4
Benthe König	Shot put	17.27	13	did not advance	
Jessica Schilder	Shot put	18.95	2 Q	20.24	1st place, gold medalist(s)
Jorinde van Klinken	Shot put	18.62	4 Q	18.94	3rd place, bronze medalist(s)
Jorinde van Klinken	Discus throw	62.18	7	64.43	4
Alida van Daalen	Discus throw	56.05	18	did not advance	

Combined events – Heptathlon

Athlete	Event	100H	HJ	SP	200 m	LJ	JT	800 m	Final	Rank
Sofie Dokter	Result	13.81	1.80	12.78	24.57	5.82	35.82	2:21.29	5811	11
Sofie Dokter	Points	1005	978	713	927	795	587	806	5811	11
Emma Oosterwegel	Result	DNF	DNS						DNF	
Emma Oosterwegel	Points	0	DNS						DNF	
Anouk Vetter	Result	13.37	1.71	15.68	24.00	6.27	DNS		DNF	
Anouk Vetter	Points	1069	867	907	981	934	DNS		DNF	

== Beach Volleyball ==
Netherlands has qualified 4 male and 3 female pairs.

=== Men ===
Athlete	Event	Preliminary round			Round of 24	Round of 16	Quarterfinals	Semifinals	Final / BM	
Athlete	Event	Opposition Score	Opposition Score	Rank	Opposition Score	Opposition Score	Opposition Score	Opposition Score	Opposition Score	Rank
Alexander Brouwer; Robert Meeuwsen	Men's	Pfretzschner – Huster (GER); W 2-0	Kantor – Rudol (POL); W 2-0	1 Q	Bye	Seidl – Waller (AUT); L 1-2	did not advance			
Yorick de Groot; Stefan Boermans	Men's	Hörl – Horst (AUT); L 1-2	Abell – Brinck (AUT); W 2-0	3 q	Herrera – Gavira (ESP); L 1-2	did not advance				
Leon Luini; Ruben Penninga	Men's	van Werkhoven – van de Velde (NED); L 0-2	Sepka – van de Velde (NED); W 2-0	3 q	Seidl – Waller (AUT); L 1-2	did not advance				
Mart van Werkhoven; Steven van de Velde	Men's	Luini – Penninga (NED); W 2-0	Nicolai – Semerád (CZE); L 0-2	2 q	Lupo – Ranghieri (ITA); W 2-0	Bryl – Łosiak (POL); L 0-2	did not advance			

=== Women ===
Athlete	Event	Preliminary round			Round of 24	Round of 16	Quarterfinals	Semifinals	Final / BM	
Athlete	Event	Opposition Score	Opposition Score	Rank	Opposition Score	Opposition Score	Opposition Score	Opposition Score	Opposition Score	Rank
Emma Piersma; Mexime van Driel	Women's	Schützenhofer – Plesiutschnig (AUT); L 0-2	Makhno – Makhno (UKR); L 0-2	4	did not advance					
Katja Stam; Raïsa Schoon	Women's	Dumbauskaitė – Grudzinskaitė (LTU); W 2-1	Böbner – Vergé-Depré (SUI); W 2-0	1 Q	Bye	Makhno – Makhno (UKR); W 2-1	Bentele – Vergé-Depré (SUI); W 2-1	Kravčenoka – Graudiņa (LAT); L 0-2	Álvarez – Moreno (ESP); W 2-1	3rd place, bronze medalist(s)
Emi van Driel; Pleun Ypma	Women's	Ittlinger – Schneider (GER)	Carro – Lobato (ESP); L 0-2	4	did not advance					

== Cycling ==
=== Road ===
Men

Athlete	Event	Time	Rank
Nils Eekhoff	Road race	4:39:39	81
Jos van Emden	Road race	4:40:34	92
Daan Hoole	Road race	4:40:34	91
Fabio Jakobsen	Road race	4:38:49	1st place, gold medalist(s)
Jan Maas	Road race	4:42:20	105
Boy van Poppel	Road race	4:39:28	65
Danny van Poppel	Road race	4:38:49	4
Elmar Reinders	Road race	4:44:27	118
Jos van Emden	Time trial	0:28:28	9

Women

Athlete	Event	Time	Rank
Ellen van Dijk	Road race	2:59:38	42
Anouska Koster	Road race	2:59:38	43
Jeanne Korevaar	Road race	3:02:01	62
Charlotte Kool	Road race	2:59:40	44
Floortje Mackaij	Road race	2:59:38	41
Riejanne Markus	Road race	2:59:44	50
Lorena Wiebes	Road race	2:59:20	1st place, gold medalist(s)
Ellen van Dijk	Time trial	0:31:06	2nd place, silver medalist(s)
Riejanne Markus	Time trial	0:31:28	3rd place, bronze medalist(s)

=== Track ===
Sprint

Athlete	Event	Qualification		Round 1	Round 2	Quarterfinals	Semifinals	Final	
Athlete	Event	Time Speed (km/h)	Rank	Opposition Time	Opposition Time	Opposition Time	Opposition Time	Opposition Time	Rank
Tijmen van Loon	Men's sprint	9.695	5 Q	Bye	Sarnecki (POL); W	Helal (FRA); L, L	did not advance		
Laurine van Riessen	Women's sprint	10.593	3 Q	Bye	Bell (GBR); W	van de Wouw (NED); W, W	Emma Hinze (GER); L, L	Friedrich (GER); W, W	3rd place, bronze medalist(s)
Hetty van de Wouw	Women's sprint	10.593	6 Q	Bye	Vece (ITA); W	van Riessen (NED); L, L	did not advance		

Team sprint

Athlete	Event	Qualification		Round 1		Final	
Athlete	Event	Time	Rank	Opposition Time	Rank	Opposition Time Speed (km/h)	Rank
Roy van den Berg; Jeffrey Hoogland; Harrie Lavreysen	Men's team sprint	35.036	1	Italy; W 34.810	1 FA	France; W 34.639	1st place, gold medalist(s)
Kyra Lamberink; Shanne Braspennincx; Hetty van de Wouw; Steffie van der Peet ^{[a]}	Women's team sprint	38.492	2	No opponent Q 38.474	4 FA	Germany; L 38.304	2nd place, silver medalist(s)

Qualification legend: FA=Gold medal final;
^{a} Athlete who participated in the qualification round only.

Time trial

Cyclist	Event	Qualification		Final	
Cyclist	Event	Time	Rank	Time	Rank
Kyra Lamberink	Women's 500 m time trial	33.992	8	34.042	7
Steffie van der Peet	Women's 500 m time trial	33.613	5	33.673	4

Individual Pursuit

Cyclist	Event	Qualification		Final	
Cyclist	Event	Time	Rank	Opponent Results	Rank
Brian Megens	Men's individual pursuit	4:15.460	5	did not advance	
Daniek Hengeveld	Women's individual pursuit	3:28.233	6	did not advance	

Team pursuit

Cyclist	Event	Qualification		Round 1	Final	
Cyclist	Event	Time	Rank	Opponent Time	Opponent Time	Rank
Mylène de Zoete; Daniek Hengeveld; Lonneke Uneken; Amber van der Hulst	Women's team pursuit	4:23.843	5 q	Switzerland; 4:22.280	Did not advance	5

Scratch

Cyclist	Event	Rank
Roy Eefting	Men's scratch	3rd place, bronze medalist(s)
Maike van der Duin	Women's scratch	5

Points race

Cyclist	Event	Final			
Cyclist	Event	Lap points	Sprint points	Total	Rank
Vincent Hoppezak	Men's points race	100	13	113	3rd place, bronze medalist(s)
Lonneke Uneken	Women's points race	0	0	0	10

Cyclist	Event	Rank
Roy Eefting	Men's scratch	3rd place, bronze medalist(s)
Maike van der Duin	Women's scratch	5

Elimination race

Cyclist	Event	Rank
Yoeri Havik	Men's elimination race	4
Mylène de Zoete	Women's elimination race	3rd place, bronze medalist(s)

== Gymnastics ==
Netherlands has entered five male and five female athletes.

=== Men ===
Team event

Athlete	Event	Qualification								Final							
Athlete	Event	Apparatus						Total	Rank	Apparatus						Total	Rank
Athlete	Event	F	PH	R	V	PB	HB	Total	Rank	F	PH	R	V	PB	HB	Total	Rank
Loran de Munck	Team															—	
Martijn de Veer	Team															—	
Jermain Grünberg	Team															—	
Jordi Hagenaar	Team															—	
Yazz Ramsahai	Team															—	
Total	Team																

Individual finals

Athlete	Event								
Athlete	Event	Apparatus						Total	Rank
Athlete	Event	F	PH	R	V	PB	HB	Total	Rank
Loran de Munck	Pommel horse	—	14.700	—				14.700	2nd place, silver medalist(s)

=== Women ===
Team event

Athlete	Event	Qualification						Final					
Athlete	Event	Apparatus				Total	Rank	Apparatus				Total	Rank
Athlete	Event	V	UB	BB	F	Total	Rank	V	UB	BB	F	Total	Rank
Shade van Oorschoot	Team			10.966	12.566	23.532						—	
Vera van Pol	Team	13.556	12.800	12.500	12.633	51.499	16	13.600		12.100	12.800	—	
Sanna Veerman	Team	13.200	12.800			26.000		13.433	13.400			—	
Naomi Visser	Team	13.133	14.266	12.233	16.633	56.265	6 Q	13.300	14.066	12.700	13.033	—	
Tisha Volleman	Team	12.833	13.200	11.300	13.000	50.833	18		13.200	11.666	13.166	—	
Total	Team	38.899	40.266	36.033	39.266	155.464	6	40.333	40.666	36.466	38.999	156.464	4

Individual finals

Athlete	Event	Apparatus				Total	Rank
Athlete	Event	V	UB	BB	F	Total	Rank
Naomi Visser	All-around	13.133	14.266	12.233	13.633	53.265	6
Naomi Visser	Uneven bars	—	13.066	—		13.066	7
Naomi Visser	Floor	—			13.133	13.133	6

== Triathlon ==
=== Men ===
Athlete	Event	Swim (1.5 km)	Trans 1	Bike (40 km)	Trans 2	Run (10 km)	Total Time	Rank
Victor Goené	Men's	19:01	0:31	0:53:38	0:24	0:35:54	1:49:27	52
Donald Hillebregt	Men's	18:31	0:38	0:54:05	0:27	0:35:45	1:49:25	51
Richard Murray	Men's	19:29	0:34	0:53:08	0:25	0:32:25	1:45:59	37

=== Women ===
Athlete	Event	Swim (1.5 km)	Trans 1	Bike (40 km)	Trans 2	Run (10 km)	Total Time	Rank
Barbara de Koning	Women's	19:31	0:36	1:00:17	0:35	0:40:09	2:01:05	37
Rachel Klamer	Women's	19:42	0:37	0:57:09	0:26	0:36:40	1:54:33	16
Rani Skrabanja	Women's	19:39	0:38	0:57:10	0:28	0:38:58	1:56:51	20
Marit van den Berg	Women's	21:48	0:35	did not finish				

=== Mixed ===
Athlete	Event	Swim (300 m)	Trans 1	Bike (6.8 km)	Trans 2	Run (2 km)	Total Group Time	Rank
Donald Hillebregt; Rani Skrabanja; Victor Goené; Barbara de Koning	Mixed relay						1:29:50	14
