= Beach volleyball at the 2015 European Games – Women's tournament =

Women's beach volleyball at the 2015 European Games
- Venue: Beach Arena
- Date: 16–20 June
- Competitors: 62 from 19 nations
- Teams: 31

Medalists
gold medal	Nicole Eiholzer; Nina Betschart	Switzerland
silver medal	Katharina Schützenhöfer; Lena Plesiutschnig	Austria
bronze medal	Ieva Dumbauskaitė; Monika Povilaitytė	Lithuania

The women's beach volleyball competition at the 2015 European Games in Baku, Azerbaijan was held from 16 to 20 June 2015 at the Beach Arena.

== Preliminary round ==
=== Pool A ===
Pos	Team	Pld	W	L	Pts	SW	SL	SR	SPW	SPL	SPR	Qualification
1	Dumbauskaitė – Povilaitytė (LTU)	3	3	0	6	6	2	3.000	158	132	1.197	Round of 16
2	Schützenhöfer – Plesiutschnig (AUT)	3	2	1	5	5	2	2.500	135	118	1.144	Round of 24
3	Cunha – Liubymova (AZE)	3	1	2	4	3	4	0.750	131	132	0.992	Round of 24
4	Bang – Olsen (DEN)	3	0	3	3	0	6	0.000	84	126	0.667	

Date	Time		Score		Set 1	Set 2	Set 3	Total	Report
16 Jun	13:00	Cunha – Liubymova (AZE)	2–0	Bang – Olsen (DEN)	21–14	21–17		42–31	Report
16 Jun	13:00	Dumbauskaitė – Povilaitytė (LTU)	2–1	Schützenhöfer – Plesiutschnig (AUT)	21–14	18–21	18–16	57–51	Report
16 Jun	20:00	Dumbauskaitė – Povilaitytė (LTU)	2–0	Bang – Olsen (DEN)	21–9	21–17		42–26	Report
16 Jun	22:00	Cunha – Liubymova (AZE)	0–2	Schützenhöfer – Plesiutschnig (AUT)	19–21	15–21		34–42	Report
17 Jun	22:00	Cunha – Liubymova (AZE)	1–2	Dumbauskaitė – Povilaitytė (LTU)	17–21	23–21	15–17	55–59	Report
17 Jun	22:00	Schützenhöfer – Plesiutschnig (AUT)	2–0	Bang – Olsen (DEN)	21–9	21–18		42–27	Report

=== Pool B ===
Pos	Team	Pld	W	L	Pts	SW	SL	SR	SPW	SPL	SPR	Qualification
1	Giombini – Toti (ITA)	3	3	0	6	6	2	3.000	149	118	1.263	Round of 16
2	Ozoliņa – Graudiņa (LAT)	3	1	2	4	4	5	0.800	156	152	1.026	Round of 24
3	Žolnerčíková – Jakubšová (CZE)	3	1	2	4	3	5	0.600	140	151	0.927	Round of 24
4	Teufl – Zass (AUT)	3	1	2	4	3	4	0.750	116	140	0.829	

Date	Time		Score		Set 1	Set 2	Set 3	Total	Report
16 Jun	10:00	Žolnerčíková – Jakubšová (CZE)	2–1	Ozoliņa – Graudiņa (LAT)	17–21	21–18	15–9	53–48	Report
16 Jun	10:00	Giombini – Toti (ITA)	2–0	Teufl – Zass (AUT)	21–11	21–10		42–21	Report
16 Jun	17:00	Žolnerčíková – Jakubšová (CZE)	0–2	Teufl – Zass (AUT)	24–26	17–21		41–47	Report
16 Jun	17:00	Giombini – Toti (ITA)	2–1	Ozoliņa – Graudiņa (LAT)	21–17	15–21	15–13	51–51	Report
17 Jun	17:00	Žolnerčíková – Jakubšová (CZE)	1–2	Giombini – Toti (ITA)	22–20	14–21	10–15	46–56	Report
17 Jun	17:00	Teufl – Zass (AUT)	1–2	Ozoliņa – Graudiņa (LAT)	16–21	23–21	9–15	48–57	Report

=== Pool C ===
Pos	Team	Pld	W	L	Pts	SW	SL	SR	SPW	SPL	SPR	Qualification
1	Soria – Lobato (ESP)	2	2	0	4	4	0	MAX	84	61	1.377	Round of 16
2	Babenka – Mileuskaya (BLR)	2	1	1	3	2	2	1.000	80	79	1.013	Round of 24
3	Kongshavn – Kjølberg (NOR)	2	0	2	2	0	4	0.000	64	88	0.727	Round of 24

Date	Time		Score		Set 1	Set 2	Set 3	Total	Report
16 Jun	10:00	Soria – Lobato (ESP)	2–0	Babenka – Mileuskaya (BLR)	21–19	21–15		42–34	Report
16 Jun	17:00	Soria – Lobato (ESP)	2–0	Kongshavn – Kjølberg (NOR)	21–13	21–14		42–27	Report
17 Jun	17:00	Kongshavn – Kjølberg (NOR)	0–2	Babenka – Mileuskaya (BLR)	14–21	23–25		37–46	Report

=== Pool D ===
Pos	Team	Pld	W	L	Pts	SW	SL	SR	SPW	SPL	SPR	Qualification
1	Van Gestel – Van der Vlist (NED)	3	3	0	6	6	1	6.000	139	92	1.511	Round of 16
2	Er. Nyström – Em. Nyström (FIN)	3	2	1	5	4	2	2.000	110	96	1.146	Round of 24
3	Karagkouni – Metheniti (GRE)	3	1	2	4	3	4	0.750	114	125	0.912	Round of 24
4	Angelova – Mishonova (BUL)	3	0	3	3	0	6	0.000	76	126	0.603	

Date	Time		Score		Set 1	Set 2	Set 3	Total	Report
16 Jun	12:00	Van Gestel – Van der Vlist (NED)	2–0	Angelova – Mishonova (BUL)	21–10	21–8		42–18	Report
16 Jun	12:00	Karagkouni – Metheniti (GRE)	0–2	Er. Nyström – Em. Nyström (FIN)	14–21	10–21		24–42	Report
16 Jun	19:00	Van Gestel – Van der Vlist (NED)	2–0	Er. Nyström – Em. Nyström (FIN)	21–15	21–11		42–26	Report
16 Jun	19:00	Karagkouni – Metheniti (GRE)	2–0	Angelova – Mishonova (BUL)	21–11	21–17		42–28	Report
17 Jun	19:00	Van Gestel – Van der Vlist (NED)	2–1	Karagkouni – Metheniti (GRE)	21–14	19–21	15–13	55–48	Report
17 Jun	19:00	Er. Nyström – Em. Nyström (FIN)	2–0	Angelova – Mishonova (BUL)	21–12	21–18		42–30	Report

=== Pool E ===
Pos	Team	Pld	W	L	Pts	SW	SL	SR	SPW	SPL	SPR	Qualification
1	Lehtonen – Lahti (FIN)	3	2	1	5	4	2	2.000	123	90	1.367	Round of 16
2	Gioria – Momoli (ITA)	3	2	1	5	4	3	1.333	142	140	1.014	Round of 24
3	Ribera – Fernández (ESP)	3	2	1	5	4	2	2.000	109	110	0.991	Round of 24
4	Shalayeuskaya – Siakretava (BLR)	3	0	3	3	1	6	0.167	112	146	0.767	

Date	Time		Score		Set 1	Set 2	Set 3	Total	Report
16 Jun	11:00	Gioria – Momoli (ITA)	2–1	Shalayeuskaya – Siakretava (BLR)	19–21	28–26	15–11	62–58	Report
16 Jun	11:00	Lehtonen – Lahti (FIN)	2–0	Ribera – Fernández (ESP)	21–15	21–9		42–24	Report
16 Jun	18:00	Gioria – Momoli (ITA)	0–2	Ribera – Fernández (ESP)	17–21	20–22		37–43	Report
16 Jun	18:00	Lehtonen – Lahti (FIN)	2–0	Shalayeuskaya – Siakretava (BLR)	21–11	21–12		42–33	Report
17 Jun	18:00	Gioria – Momoli (ITA)	2–0	Lehtonen – Lahti (FIN)	22–20	21–19		43–39	Report
17 Jun	18:00	Ribera – Fernández (ESP)	2–0	Shalayeuskaya – Siakretava (BLR)	21–12	21–19		42–31	Report

=== Pool F ===
Pos	Team	Pld	W	L	Pts	SW	SL	SR	SPW	SPL	SPR	Qualification
1	Eiholzer – Betschart (SUI)	3	3	0	6	6	1	6.000	140	128	1.094	Round of 16
2	Braakman – Sinnema (NED)	3	2	1	5	4	3	1.333	137	119	1.151	Round of 24
3	Abalakina – Dabizha (RUS)	3	1	2	4	4	4	1.000	143	131	1.092	Round of 24
4	Trans – Søndergård (DEN)	3	0	3	3	0	6	0.000	84	126	0.667	

Date	Time		Score		Set 1	Set 2	Set 3	Total	Report
16 Jun	11:00	Eiholzer – Betschart (SUI)	2–1	Trans – Søndergård (DEN)	21–18	21–17		42–35	Report
16 Jun	11:00	Abalakina – Dabizha (RUS)	1–2	Braakman – Sinnema (NED)	21–18	15–21	13–15	49–54	Report
16 Jun	18:00	Eiholzer – Betschart (SUI)	2–0	Braakman – Sinnema (NED)	21–19	24–22		45–41	Report
16 Jun	18:00	Abalakina – Dabizha (RUS)	2–0	Trans – Søndergård (DEN)	21–13	21–11		42–24	Report
17 Jun	18:00	Eiholzer – Betschart (SUI)	2–1	Abalakina – Dabizha (RUS)	17–21	21–19	15–12	53–52	Report
17 Jun	18:00	Braakman – Sinnema (NED)	2–0	Trans – Søndergård (DEN)	21–13	21–12		42–25	Report

=== Pool G ===
Pos	Team	Pld	W	L	Pts	SW	SL	SR	SPW	SPL	SPR	Qualification
1	Longuet – Adelin (FRA)	3	3	0	6	6	1	6.000	141	117	1.205	Round of 16
2	Prokopeva – Syrtseva (RUS)	3	2	1	5	4	2	2.000	111	105	1.057	Round of 24
3	Gruszczyńska – Baran (POL)	3	1	2	4	2	5	0.400	126	134	0.940	Round of 24
4	Ir. Makhno – In. Makhno (UKR)	3	0	3	3	2	6	0.333	130	152	0.855	

Date	Time		Score		Set 1	Set 2	Set 3	Total	Report
16 Jun	13:00	Gruszczyńska – Baran (POL)	2–1	Ir. Makhno – In. Makhno (UKR)	21–16	17–21	15–13	53–50	Report
16 Jun	13:00	Prokopeva – Syrtseva (RUS)	0–2	Longuet – Adelin (FRA)	13–21	14–21		27–42	Report
16 Jun	19:00	Gruszczyńska – Baran (POL)	0–2	Longuet – Adelin (FRA)	19–21	18–21		37–42	Report
16 Jun	19:00	Prokopeva – Syrtseva (RUS)	2–0	Ir. Makhno – In. Makhno (UKR)	21–13	21–14		42–27	Report
17 Jun	20:00	Gruszczyńska – Baran (POL)	0–2	Prokopeva – Syrtseva (RUS)	19–21	17–21		36–42	Report
17 Jun	20:00	Longuet – Adelin (FRA)	2–1	Ir. Makhno – In. Makhno (UKR)	18–21	24–22	15–10	57–53	Report

=== Pool H ===
Pos	Team	Pld	W	L	Pts	SW	SL	SR	SPW	SPL	SPR	Qualification
1	Řeháčková – Gálová (CZE)	3	2	1	5	4	3	1.333	129	123	1.049	Round of 16
2	Ferreira – Karimova (AZE)	3	2	1	5	5	2	2.500	134	124	1.081	Round of 24
3	Udovenko – Sulima (UKR)	3	1	2	4	2	5	0.400	120	137	0.876	Round of 24
4	Kociołek – Strąg (POL)	3	1	2	4	3	4	0.750	131	130	1.008	

Date	Time		Score		Set 1	Set 2	Set 3	Total	Report
16 Jun	12:00	Ferreira – Karimova (AZE)	2–0	Kociołek – Strąg (POL)	21–18	21–18		42–36	Report
16 Jun	12:00	Řeháčková – Gálová (CZE)	2–0	Udovenko – Sulima (UKR)	21–12	21–19		42–31	Report
16 Jun	20:00	Řeháčková – Gálová (CZE)	0–2	Kociołek – Strąg (POL)	15–21	17–21		32–42	Report
16 Jun	21:00	Ferreira – Karimova (AZE)	2–0	Udovenko – Sulima (UKR)	21–17	21–16		42–33	Report
17 Jun	21:00	Ferreira – Karimova (AZE)	1–2	Řeháčková – Gálová (CZE)	21–17	21–23	8–15	50–55	Report
17 Jun	21:00	Udovenko – Sulima (UKR)	2–1	Kociołek – Strąg (POL)	21–18	19–21	16–14	56–53	Report

== Knockout stage ==
=== Round of 24 ===
Date	Time		Score		Set 1	Set 2	Set 3	Total	Report
18 Jun	13:00	Gioria – Momoli (ITA)	0–2	Gruszczyńska – Baran (POL)	19–21	17–21		36–42	Report
18 Jun	13:00	Babenka – Mileuskaya (BLR)	1–2	Ribera – Fernández (ESP)	21–18	16–21	13–15	50–54	Report
18 Jun	13:00	Prokopeva – Syrtseva (RUS)	2–0	Kongshavn – Kjølberg (NOR)	21–10	21–18		42–28	Report
18 Jun	13:00	Schützenhöfer – Plesiutschnig (AUT)	2–0	Abalakina – Dabizha (RUS)	21–13	21–14		42–27	Report
18 Jun	12:00	Ferreira – Karimova (AZE)	0–2	Žolnerčíková – Jakubšová (CZE)	21–23	19–21		40–44	Report
18 Jun	12:00	Ozoliņa – Graudiņa (LAT)	2–0	Udovenko – Sulima (UKR)	21–16	21–16		42–32	Report
18 Jun	12:00	Braakman – Sinnema (NED)	2–0	Karagkouni – Metheniti (GRE)	21–15	21–17		42–32	Report
18 Jun	12:00	Er. Nyström – Em. Nyström (FIN)	0–2	Cunha – Liubymova (AZE)	19–21	13–21		32–42	Report

=== Round of 16 ===
Date	Time		Score		Set 1	Set 2	Set 3	Total	Report
18 Jun	20:00	Dumbauskaitė – Povilaitytė (LTU)	2–1	Gruszczyńska – Baran (POL)	21–16	15–21	17–15	53–52	Report
18 Jun	20:00	Řeháčková – Gálová (CZE)	2–1	Ribera – Fernández (ESP)	16–21	22–20	15–13	53–54	Report
18 Jun	20:00	Lehtonen – Lahti (FIN)	0–2	Prokopeva – Syrtseva (RUS)	18–21	17–21		35–42	Report
18 Jun	19:00	Van Gestel – Van der Vlist (NED)	1–2	Schützenhöfer – Plesiutschnig (AUT)	18–21	22–20	13–15	53–56	Report
18 Jun	22:00	Soria – Lobato (ESP)	2–1	Žolnerčíková – Jakubšová (CZE)	21–16	20–22	15–11	56–49	Report
18 Jun	19:00	Eiholzer – Betschart (SUI)	2–1	Ozoliņa – Graudiņa (LAT)	21–17	16–21	15–11	52–49	Report
18 Jun	19:00	Longuet – Adelin (FRA)	0–2	Braakman – Sinnema (NED)	20–22	19–21		39–43	Report
18 Jun	21:00	Giombini – Toti (ITA)	2–1	Cunha – Liubymova (AZE)	17–21	21–17	15–11	53–49	Report

=== Quarterfinals ===
Date	Time		Score		Set 1	Set 2	Set 3	Total	Report
19 Jun	17:00	Dumbauskaitė – Povilaitytė (LTU)	2–0	Řeháčková – Gálová (CZE)	21–17	21–14		42–31	Report
19 Jun	17:00	Prokopeva – Syrtseva (RUS)	1–2	Schützenhöfer – Plesiutschnig (AUT)	21–16	13–21	12–15	46–52	Report
19 Jun	18:00	Soria – Lobato (ESP)	0–2	Eiholzer – Betschart (SUI)	14–21	13–21		27–42	Report
19 Jun	18:00	Braakman – Sinnema (NED)	1–2	Giombini – Toti (ITA)	19–21	21–14	16–18	56–53	Report

=== Semifinals ===
Date	Time		Score		Set 1	Set 2	Set 3	Total	Report
20 Jun	12:00	Dumbauskaitė – Povilaitytė (LTU)	0–2	Schützenhöfer – Plesiutschnig (AUT)	18–21	18–21		36–42	Report
20 Jun	13:00	Eiholzer – Betschart (SUI)	2–0	Giombini – Toti (ITA)	21–11	22–20		43–31	Report

=== Bronze medal game ===
Date	Time		Score		Set 1	Set 2	Set 3	Total	Report
20 Jun	21:00	Dumbauskaitė – Povilaitytė (LTU)	2–0	Giombini – Toti (ITA)	21–19	21–19		42–38	Report

=== Final ===
Date	Time		Score		Set 1	Set 2	Set 3	Total	Report
20 Jun	22:00	Schützenhöfer – Plesiutschnig (AUT)	1–2	Eiholzer – Betschart (SUI)	16–21	21–14	13–15	50–50	Report
