= 2022 European Beach Volleyball Championships =

European Beach Volleyball Championship

Tournament details
- Host country: Munich, Germany
- Dates: 15–21 August 2022
- Teams: 64
- Venue: Königsplatz, Munich (in 1 host city)

The 2022 European Beach Volleyball Championships is a 2022 edition of European Beach Volleyball Championship which is a unisex competition of national teams that took place from 15 to 21 August 2022 in Munich, Germany. The draw consisted of 32 men's & 32 women's teams.

== Medal events ==
=== Medal table ===
Rank	Nation	Gold	Silver	Bronze	Total
1	Latvia	1	0	0	1
1	Sweden	1	0	0	1
3	Czech Republic	0	1	0	1
3	Switzerland	0	1	0	1
5	Netherlands	0	0	1	1
5	Norway	0	0	1	1
Totals (6 entries)		2	2	2	6

=== Medal summary ===
Event	Gold	Silver	Bronze
Men	Sweden; David Åhman; Jonatan Hellvig	Czech Republic; Ondřej Perušič; David Schweiner	Norway; Anders Mol; Christian Sørum
Women	Latvia; Tīna Graudiņa; Anastasija Kravčenoka	Switzerland; Nina Brunner; Tanja Hüberli	Netherlands; Raïsa Schoon; Katja Stam

== Men's tournament ==
=== Preliminary round ===
==== Pool A ====
Pos	Team	Pld	W	L	Pts	SW	SL	SR	SPW	SPL	SPR	Qualification
1	Mol–Sørum (NOR)	2	2	0	4	4	0	MAX	85	72	1.181	Round of 16
2	Berntsen–Mol (NOR)	2	1	1	3	2	2	1.000	79	72	1.097	Round of 24
3	Åhman–Hellvig (SWE)	2	1	1	3	2	2	1.000	78	80	0.975	Round of 24
4	Elazar–Ohana (ISR)	2	0	2	2	0	4	0.000	66	84	0.786	

Source: cev.eu

Date	Time		Score		Set 1	Set 2	Set 3	Total	Report
16 Aug	17:00	Åhman–Hellvig (Sweden)	2–0	(Norway) Berntsen–Mol	21–18	21–19		42–37	Report
16 Aug	18:00	Mol–Sørum (Norway)	2–0	(Israel) Elazar–Ohana	21–19	21–17		42–36	Report
17 Aug	18:00	Elazar–Ohana (Israel)	0–2	(Norway) Berntsen–Mol	12–21	18–21		30–42	Report
17 Aug	19:00	Mol–Sørum (Norway)	2–0	(Sweden) Åhman–Hellvig	22–20	21–16		43–36	Report

==== Pool B ====
Pos	Team	Pld	W	L	Pts	SW	SL	SR	SPW	SPL	SPR	Qualification
1	Brouwer–Meeuwsen (NED)	2	2	0	4	4	0	MAX	84	54	1.556	Round of 16
2	Kantor–Rudol (POL)	2	1	1	3	2	3	0.667	88	100	0.880	Round of 24
3	Samoilovs–Šmēdiņš (LAT)	2	1	1	3	3	2	1.500	100	93	1.075	Round of 24
4	Pfretzschner–Huster (GER)	2	0	2	2	0	4	0.000	59	84	0.702	

Source: cev.eu

Date	Time		Score		Set 1	Set 2	Set 3	Total	Report
16 Aug	18:00	Kantor–Rudol (Poland)	2–1	(Latvia) Samoilovs–Šmēdiņš	21–23	25–23	15–12	61–58	
16 Aug	19:00	Brouwer–Meeuwsen (Netherlands)	2–0	(Germany) Pfretzschner–Huster	21–14	21–13		42–27	
17 Aug	18:00	Brouwer–Meeuwsen (Netherlands)	2–0	(Poland) Kantor–Rudol	21–17	21–10		42–27	
17 Aug	18:00	Pfretzschner–Huster (Germany)	0–2	(Latvia) Samoilovs–Šmēdiņš	15–21	17–21		33–42	

==== Pool C ====
Pos	Team	Pld	W	L	Pts	SW	SL	SR	SPW	SPL	SPR	Qualification
1	Nicolai–Cottafava (ITA)	2	2	0	4	4	0	MAX	84	64	1.313	Round of 16
2	van Werkhoven–van de Velde (NED)	2	1	1	3	2	2	1.000	78	78	1.000	Round of 24
3	Luini–Penninga (NED)	2	1	1	3	2	2	1.000	78	75	1.040	Round of 24
4	Šépka–Semerád (CZE)	2	0	2	2	0	4	0.000	61	84	0.726	

Source: cev.eu

Date	Time		Score		Set 1	Set 2	Set 3	Total	Report
16 Aug	15:00	Nicolai–Cottafava (Italy)	2–0	(Czech Republic) Šépka–Semerád	21–15	21–16		42–31	
16 Aug	15:00	van Werkhoven–van de Velde (Netherlands)	2–0	(Netherlands) Luini–Penninga	21–14	24–22		45–36	
17 Aug	12:30	Nicolai–Cottafava (Italy)	2–0	(Netherlands) van Werkhoven–van de Velde	21–15	21–18		42–33	
17 Aug	14:00	Šépka–Semerád (Czech Republic)	0–2	(Netherlands) Luini–Penninga	14–21	16–21		30–42	

==== Pool D ====
Pos	Team	Pld	W	L	Pts	SW	SL	SR	SPW	SPL	SPR	Qualification
1	Perušič–Schweiner (CZE)	2	2	0	4	4	2	2.000	113	99	1.141	Round of 16
2	Krou–Gauthier-Rat (FRA)	2	1	1	3	3	2	1.500	87	92	0.946	Round of 24
3	Sowa–Pfretzschner (GER)	2	1	1	3	3	3	1.000	113	115	0.983	Round of 24
4	Ermacora–Pristauz (AUT)	2	0	2	2	1	4	0.250	94	101	0.931	

Source: cev.eu

Date	Time		Score		Set 1	Set 2	Set 3	Total	Report
16 Aug	19:00	Ermacora–Pristauz (Austria)	0–2	(France) Krou–Gauthier-Rat	19–21	18–21		37–42	
16 Aug	20:00	Perušič–Schweiner (Czech Republic)	2–1	(Germany) Sowa–Pfretzschner	26–24	17–21	15–9	58–54	
17 Aug	19:00	Perušič–Schweiner (Czech Republic)	2–1	(France) Krou–Gauthier-Rat	19–21	21–14	15–10	55–45	
17 Aug	20:00	Sowa–Pfretzschner (Germany)	2–1	(Austria) Ermacora–Pristauz	19–21	25–23	15–13	59–57	

==== Pool E ====
Pos	Team	Pld	W	L	Pts	SW	SL	SR	SPW	SPL	SPR	Qualification
1	Krattiger–Breer (SUI)	2	2	0	4	4	0	MAX	90	72	1.250	Round of 16
2	Nõlvak–Tiisaar (EST)	2	1	1	3	2	2	1.000	85	82	1.037	Round of 24
3	Lupo–Ranghieri (ITA)	2	1	1	3	2	3	0.667	284	90	3.156	Round of 24
4	Nurminen–Sirén (FIN)	2	0	2	2	1	4	0.250	82	97	0.845	

Source: cev.eu

Date	Time		Score		Set 1	Set 2	Set 3	Total	Report
16 Aug	19:00	Lupo–Ranghieri (Italy)	0–2	(Switzerland) Krattiger–Breer	13–21	16–21		29–42	
16 Aug	21:00	Nõlvak–Tiisaar (Estonia)	2–0	(Finland) Nurminen–Sirén	21–19	21–15		42–34	
17 Aug	19:00	Nurminen–Sirén (Finland)	1–2	(Italy) Lupo–Ranghieri	19–21	21–19	8–15	48–55	
17 Aug	21:00	Nõlvak–Tiisaar (Estonia)	0–2	(Switzerland) Krattiger–Breer	18–21	25–27		43–48	

==== Pool F ====
Pos	Team	Pld	W	L	Pts	SW	SL	SR	SPW	SPL	SPR	Qualification
1	Hörl–Horst (AUT)	2	2	0	4	4	2	2.000	109	101	1.079	Round of 16
2	Ehlers–Wickler (GER)	2	1	1	3	3	3	1.000	110	105	1.048	Round of 24
3	Immers–Boermans (NED)	2	1	1	3	3	2	1.500	92	90	1.022	Round of 24
4	Abell–Brinck (DEN)	2	0	2	2	1	4	0.250	86	101	0.851	

Source: cev.eu

Date	Time		Score		Set 1	Set 2	Set 3	Total	Report
16 Aug	15:00	Immers–Boermans (Netherlands)	1–2	(Austria) Hörl–Horst	19–21	23–21	8–15	50–57	
16 Aug	16:00	Ehlers–Wickler (Germany)	2–1	(Denmark) Abell–Brinck	18–21	21–14	20–18	59–53	
17 Aug	12:30	Abell–Brinck (Denmark)	0–2	(Netherlands) Immers–Boermans	18–21	15–21		33–42	
17 Aug	13:00	Ehlers–Wickler (Germany)	1–2	(Austria) Hörl–Horst	16–21	21–15	14–16	51–52	

==== Pool G ====
Pos	Team	Pld	W	L	Pts	SW	SL	SR	SPW	SPL	SPR	Qualification
1	Carambula–Rossi (ITA)	2	2	0	4	4	1	4.000	99	86	1.151	Round of 16
2	Seidl–Waller (AUT)	2	1	1	3	3	3	1.000	104	107	0.972	Round of 24
3	Métral–Haussener (SUI)	2	1	1	3	3	2	1.500	95	86	1.105	Round of 24
4	Benzi–Bonifazi (ITA)	2	0	2	2	0	4	0.000	68	87	0.782	

Source: cev.eu

Date	Time		Score		Set 1	Set 2	Set 3	Total	Report
16 Aug	17:00	Carambula–Rossi (Italy)	2–0	(Italy) Benzi–Bonifazi	21–14	24–22		45–36	
16 Aug	18:00	Seidl–Waller (Austria)	2–1	(Switzerland) Métral–Haussener	21–18	17–21	16–14	54–53	
17 Aug	14:00	Carambula–Rossi (Italy)	2–1	(Austria) Seidl–Waller	21–17	18–21	15–12	54–50	
17 Aug	14:00	Benzi–Bonifazi (Italy)	0–2	(Switzerland) Métral–Haussener	16–21	16–21		32–42	

==== Pool H ====
Pos	Team	Pld	W	L	Pts	SW	SL	SR	SPW	SPL	SPR	Qualification
1	Bryl–Łosiak (POL)	2	2	0	4	4	0	MAX	90	72	1.250	Round of 16
2	Herrera–Gavira (ESP)	2	1	1	3	2	2	1.000	91	88	1.034	Round of 24
3	Huber–Dressler (AUT)	2	1	1	3	2	3	0.667	89	99	0.899	Round of 24
4	Winter–Henning (GER)	2	0	2	2	1	4	0.250	80	91	0.879	

Source: cev.eu

Date	Time		Score		Set 1	Set 2	Set 3	Total	Report
16 Aug	16:00	Bryl–Łosiak (Poland)	2–0	(Germany) Winter–Henning	21–14	21–15		42–29	
16 Aug	16:00	Herrera–Gavira (Spain)	2–0	(Austria) Huber–Dressler	21–15	27–25		48–40	
17 Aug	12:00	Winter–Henning (Germany)	1–2	(Austria) Huber–Dressler	21–13	18–21	12–15	51–49	
17 Aug	12:30	Bryl–Łosiak (Poland)	2–0	(Spain) Herrera–Gavira	27–25	25–18		48–43	

=== Knockout stage ===
==== Round of 24 ====
Date	Time		Score		Set 1	Set 2	Set 3	Total	Report
18 Aug	12:00	Herrera–Gavira (ESP)	2–1	Immers–Boermans (NED)	21–16	20–22	15–11	56–49	Report
18 Aug	13:00	Seidl–Waller (AUT)	2–1	Luini–Penninga (NED)	24–26	21–15	15–10	60–51	Report
18 Aug	13:00	Kantor–Rudol (POL)	2–1	Berntsen–H. Mol (NOR)	21–15	19–21	15–12	55–48	Report
18 Aug	14:00	van Werkhoven–van de Velde (NED)	2–0	Lupo–Ranghieri (ITA)	21–12	23–21		44–33	Report
18 Aug	15:00	Ehlers–Wickler (GER)	2–1	Huber–Dressler (AUT)	21–17	19–21	15–12	55–50	Report
18 Aug	15:00	Krou–Gauthier-Rat (FRA)	0–2	Samoilovs–Šmēdiņš (LAT)	18–21	18–21		36–42	Report
18 Aug	16:00	Nõlvak–Tiisaar (EST)	2–0	Sowa–Pfretzschner (GER)	21–14	21–17		42–31	Report
18 Aug	16:00	Åhman–Hellvig (SWE)	2–1	Métral–Haussener (SUI)	18–21	21–15	15–10	54–46	Report

==== Round of 16 ====
Date	Time		Score		Set 1	Set 2	Set 3	Total	Report
19 Aug	11:00	Perušič–Schweiner (CZE)	2–1	Kantor–Rudol (POL)	21–18	21–23	15–12	57–53	Report
19 Aug	12:00	Hörl–Horst (AUT)	2–1	Nõlvak–Tiisaar (EST)	18–21	21–18	15–8	54–47	Report
19 Aug	13:00	Nicolai–Cottafava (ITA)	1–2	Åhman–Hellvig (SWE)	21–15	8–21	9–15	38–51	Report
19 Aug	14:30	Carambula–Rossi (ITA)	1–2	Herrera–Gavira (ESP)	14–21	24–22	11–15	49–58	Report
19 Aug	15:00	Krattiger–Breer (SUI)	0–2	Ehlers–Wickler (GER)	15–21	30–32		45–53	Report
19 Aug	15:30	Brouwer–Meeuwsen (NED)	1–2	Seidl–Waller (AUT)	16–21	21–10	10–15	47–46	Report
19 Aug	16:00	A. Mol–Sørum (NOR)	2–0	Samoilovs–Šmēdiņš (LAT)	21–16	21–16		42–32	Report
18 Aug	16:30	Bryl–Łosiak (POL)	2–0	van Werkhoven–van de Velde (NED)	21–9	23–21		44–30	Report

==== Quarterfinals ====
Date	Time		Score		Set 1	Set 2	Set 3	Total	Report
20 Aug	11:15	Hörl–Horst (AUT)	0–2	Perušič–Schweiner (CZE)	17–21	19–21		36–42	Report
20 Aug	12:30	Åhman–Hellvig (SWE)	2–1	Herrera–Gavira (ESP)	21–16	31–33	15–11	67–60	Report
20 Aug	13:45	Seidl–Waller (AUT)	1–2	Bryl–Łosiak (POL)	21–16	20–22	11–15	52–53	Report
20 Aug	15:00	Ehlers–Wickler (GER)	0–2	A. Mol–Sørum (NOR)	15–21	14–21		29–42	Report

==== Semifinals ====
Date	Time		Score		Set 1	Set 2	Set 3	Total	Report
21 Aug	11:00	Bryl–Łosiak (POL)	0–2	Perušič–Schweiner (CZE)	15–21	11–21		26–42	Report
20 Aug	12:30	Åhman–Hellvig (SWE)	2–1	A. Mol–Sørum (NOR)	21–16	21–23	15–13	57–52	Report

==== Third place game ====
Date	Time		Score		Set 1	Set 2	Set 3	Total	Report
21 Aug	16:00	Bryl–Łosiak (POL)	0–2	A. Mol–Sørum (NOR)	16–21	17–21		33–43	Report

==== Final ====
Date	Time		Score		Set 1	Set 2	Set 3	Total	Report
21 Aug	17:30	Perušič–Schweiner (CZE)	0–2	Åhman–Hellvig (SWE)	16–21	15–21		31–42	Report

== Women's tournament ==
=== Preliminary round ===
==== Pool A ====
Pos	Team	Pld	W	L	Pts	SW	SL	SR	SPW	SPL	SPR	Qualification
1	Álvarez–Moreno (ESP)	2	2	0	4	4	2	2.000	106	98	1.082	Round of 16
2	Müller–Tillmann (GER)	2	1	1	3	3	2	1.500	89	84	1.060	Round of 24
3	Ahtiainen–Prihti (FIN)	2	1	1	3	3	2	1.500	93	84	1.107	Round of 24
4	Vieira–Chamereau (FRA)	2	0	2	2	0	4	0.000	62	84	0.738	

Updated to match(es) played on 15 August 2022. Source: cev.eu

Date	Time		Score		Set 1	Set 2	Set 3	Total	Report
15 Aug	17:15	Müller–Tillmann (Germany)	2–0	(France) Vieira–Chamereau	21–14	21 –15		42–29	
15 Aug	18:30	Ahtiainen–Prihti (Finland)	1–2	(Spain) Álvarez–Moreno	21–15	17–21	13–15	51–51	
17 Aug	10:30	Vieira–Chamereau (France)	0–2	(Finland) Ahtiainen–Prihti	18–21	15–21		33–42	
17 Aug	11:00	Müller–Tillmann (Germany)	1–2	(Spain) Álvarez–Moreno	14–21	21–19	12–14	47–55	

==== Pool B ====
Pos	Team	Pld	W	L	Pts	SW	SL	SR	SPW	SPL	SPR	Qualification
1	Bentele–Vergé-Dépré (SUI)	2	2	0	4	4	1	4.000	101	74	1.365	Round of 16
2	Schützenhofer–Plesiutschnig (AUT)	2	1	1	3	2	3	0.667	81	87	0.931	Round of 24
3	Makhno–Makhno (UKR)	2	1	1	3	3	2	1.500	95	101	0.941	Round of 24
4	Piersma–van Driel (NED)	2	0	2	2	1	4	0.250	87	102	0.853	

Source: cev.eu

Date	Time		Score		Set 1	Set 2	Set 3	Total	Report
16 Aug	12:30	Schützenhofer–Plesiutschnig (Austria)	2–1	(Netherlands) Piersma–van Driel	21–10	19–21	16–14	59–49	
16 Aug	13:30	Bentele–Vergé-Dépré (Switzerland)	2–1	(Ukraine) Makhno–Makhno	23–25	21–13	15–11	56–45	
17 Aug	16:00	Bentele–Vergé-Dépré (Switzerland)	2–0	(Austria) Schützenhofer–Plesiutschnig	21–14	21–11		42–25	
17 Aug	16:00	Makhno–Makhno (Ukraine)	2–0	(Netherlands) Piersma–van Driel	21–19	25–23		46–42	

==== Pool C ====
Pos	Team	Pld	W	L	Pts	SW	SL	SR	SPW	SPL	SPR	Qualification
1	Kravčenoka–Graudiņa (LAT)	2	2	0	4	4	0	MAX	84	58	1.448	Round of 16
2	Lahti–Parkkinen (FIN)	2	1	1	3	2	3	0.667	86	99	0.869	Round of 24
3	Windeleff–Bisgaard (DEN)	2	1	1	3	2	2	1.000	70	74	0.946	Round of 24
4	Placette–Richard (FRA)	2	0	2	2	1	4	0.250	89	98	0.908	

Source: cev.eu

Date	Time		Score		Set 1	Set 2	Set 3	Total	Report
16 Aug	11:30	Kravčenoka–Graudiņa (Latvia)	2–0	(Denmark) Windeleff–Bisgaard	21–16	21–12		42–28	
16 Aug	11:30	Placette–Richard (France)	1–2	(Finland) Lahti–Parkkinen	19–21	21–16	17–19	57–56	
17 Aug	12:30	Kravčenoka–Graudiņa (Latvia)	2–0	(Finland) Lahti–Parkkinen	21–16	21–14		42–30	
17 Aug	14:00	Windeleff–Bisgaard (Denmark)	2–0	(France) Placette–Richard	21–15	21–17		42–32	

==== Pool D ====
Pos	Team	Pld	W	L	Pts	SW	SL	SR	SPW	SPL	SPR	Qualification
1	Hüberli–Brunner (SUI)	2	2	0	4	4	0	MAX	84	57	1.474	Round of 16
2	Walkenhorst–Lippmann (GER)	2	1	1	3	2	3	0.667	81	90	0.900	Round of 24
3	Soria–González (ESP)	2	1	1	3	2	3	0.667	84	91	0.923	Round of 24
4	Erika–Paulikienė (LTU)	2	0	2	2	2	4	0.500	97	108	0.898	

Source: cev.eu

Date	Time		Score		Set 1	Set 2	Set 3	Total	Report
16 Aug	13:30	Erika–Paulikienė (Lithuania)	1–2	(Spain) Soria–González	21–19	18–21	10–15	49–55	
16 Aug	14:00	Hüberli–Brunner (Switzerland)	2–0	(Germany) Walkenhorst–Lippmann	21–19	21–9		42–28	
17 Aug	10:00	Walkenhorst–Lippmann (Germany)	2–1	(Lithuania) Erika–Paulikienė	21–15	17–21	15–12	53–48	
17 Aug	10:30	Hüberli–Brunner (Switzerland)	2–0	(Spain) Soria–González	21–14	21–15		42–29	

==== Pool E ====
Pos	Team	Pld	W	L	Pts	SW	SL	SR	SPW	SPL	SPR	Qualification
1	Stam–Schoon (NED)	2	2	0	4	4	1	4.000	96	76	1.263	Round of 16
2	Böbner–Vergé-Depré (SUI)	2	1	1	3	2	2	1.000	76	67	1.134	Round of 24
3	Dumbauskaitė–Grudzinskaitė (LTU)	2	1	1	3	3	3	1.000	98	108	0.907	Round of 24
4	Davidova–Lunina (UKR)	2	0	2	2	1	4	0.250	79	98	0.806	

Source: cev.eu

Date	Time		Score		Set 1	Set 2	Set 3	Total	Report
16 Aug	10:00	Böbner–Vergé-Depré (Switzerland)	2–0	(Ukraine) Davidova–Lunina	21–14	21–11		42–25	
16 Aug	10:30	Stam–Schoon (Netherlands)	2–1	(Lithuania) Dumbauskaitė–Grudzinskaitė	21–11	18–21	15–10	54–42	
17 Aug	10:30	Stam–Schoon (Netherlands)	2–0	(Switzerland) Böbner–Vergé-Depré	21–17	21–17		42–34	
17 Aug	11:30	Dumbauskaitė–Grudzinskaitė (Lithuania)	2–1	(Ukraine) Davidova–Lunina	19–21	22–20	15–13	56–54	

==== Pool F ====
Pos	Team	Pld	W	L	Pts	SW	SL	SR	SPW	SPL	SPR	Qualification
1	Borger–Sude (GER)	2	2	0	4	4	0	MAX	84	65	1.292	Round of 16
2	Breidenbach–Orsi Toth (ITA)	2	1	1	3	3	3	1.000	104	107	0.972	Round of 24
3	Menegatti–Gottardi (ITA)	2	1	1	3	2	3	0.667	91	87	1.046	Round of 24
4	Baieva–Lazarenko (UKR)	2	0	2	2	1	4	0.250	81	101	0.802	

Source: cev.eu

Date	Time		Score		Set 1	Set 2	Set 3	Total	Report
16 Aug	11:00	Borger–Sude (Germany)	2–0	(Ukraine) Khmil–Lazarenko	21–13	21–14		42–27	
16 Aug	12:30	Menegatti–Gottardi (Italy)	2–1	(Italy) Breidenbach–Orsi Toth	17–21	21–12	15–12	53–45	
17 Aug	15:00	Borger–Sude (Germany)	2–0	(Italy) Menegatti–Gottardi	21–19	21–19		42–38	
17 Aug	15:00	Baieva–Lazarenko (Ukraine)	1–2	(Italy) Breidenbach–Orsi Toth	16–21	21–19	17–19	54–59	

==== Pool G ====
Pos	Team	Pld	W	L	Pts	SW	SL	SR	SPW	SPL	SPR	Qualification
1	Laboureur–Schulz (GER)	2	2	0	4	4	1	4.000	114	93	1.226	Round of 16
2	Kotnik–Lovšin (SLO)	2	2	0	4	3	2	1.500	112	108	1.037	Round of 24
3	Scampoli–Bianchin (ITA)	2	1	1	3	2	3	0.667	87	95	0.916	Round of 24
4	Klinger–Klinger (AUT)	2	0	2	2	1	4	0.250	76	93	0.817	

Source: cev.eu

Date	Time		Score		Set 1	Set 2	Set 3	Total	Report
15 Aug	20:00	Laboureur–Schulz (Germany)	2–0	(Austria) Klinger–Klinger	21–10	21–13		42–23	
15 Aug	21:00	Scampoli–Bianchin (Italy)	0–2	(Slovenia) Kotnik–Lovšin	18–21	18–21		36–42	
17 Aug	15:00	Laboureur–Schulz (Germany)	2–1	(Slovenia) Kotnik–Lovšin	19–21	23–21	30–28	72–70	
17 Aug	15:00	Klinger–Klinger (Austria)	1–2	(Italy) Scampoli–Bianchin	21–15	19–21	13–15	53–51	

==== Pool H ====
Pos	Team	Pld	W	L	Pts	SW	SL	SR	SPW	SPL	SPR	Qualification
1	Ittlinger–Schneider (GER)	2	2	0	4	4	1	4.000	98	85	1.153	Round of 16
2	Kociołek–Łodej (POL)	2	1	1	3	3	3	1.000	103	108	0.954	Round of 24
3	Carro–Lobato (ESP)	2	1	1	3	3	2	1.500	95	84	1.131	Round of 24
4	van Driel–Ypma (NED)	2	0	2	2	0	4	0.000	65	85	0.765	

Source: cev.eu

Date	Time		Score		Set 1	Set 2	Set 3	Total	Report
16 Aug	10:30	Carro–Lobato (Spain)	1–2	(Poland) Kociołek–Łodej	17–21	21–15	15–17	53–53	
16 Aug	12:00	Ittlinger–Schneider (Germany)	2–0	(Netherlands) van Driel–Ypma	21–15	22–20		43–35	
17 Aug	16:00	Ittlinger–Schneider (Germany)	2–1	(Poland) Kociołek–Łodej	19–21	21–16	15–13	55–50	
17 Aug	16:00	van Driel–Ypma (Netherlands)	0–2	(Spain) Carro–Lobato	12–21	19–21		31–42	

=== Knockout stage ===
==== Round of 24 ====
Date	Time		Score		Set 1	Set 2	Set 3	Total	Report
18 Aug	11:30	Soria–González (Spain)	2–1	(Spain) Carro–Lobato	21–16	15–21	15–11	51–48	
18 Aug	10:30	Kotnik–Lovšin (Slovenia)	0–2	(Ukraine) Makhno–Makhno	12–21	17–21		29–42	
18 Aug	10:00	Müller–Tillmann (Germany)	1–2	(Italy) Scampoli–Bianchin	21–12	19–21	15–17	55–50	
18 Aug	10:30	Kociołek–Łodej (Poland)	2–0	(Finland) Ahtiainen–Prihti	21–15	21–19		42–34	
18 Aug	11:30	Schützenhofer–Plesiutschnig (Austria)	0–2	(Denmark) Windeleff–Bisgaard	14–21	20–22		34–43	
18 Aug	11:00	Böbner–Vergé-Depré (Switzerland)	2–0	(Germany) Walkenhorst–Lippmann	21–19	22–20		43–39	
18 Aug	11:30	Menegatti–Gottardi (Italy)	2–0	(Lithuania) Dumbauskaitė–Grudzinskaitė	21–15	21–19		42–34	
18 Aug	10:30	Lahti–Parkkinen (Finland)	0–2	(Italy) Breidenbach–Orsi Toth	18–21	25–27		43–48	

==== Round of 16 ====
Date	Time		Score		Set 1	Set 2	Set 3	Total	Report
18 Aug	18:00	Borger–Sude (Germany)	2–1	(Italy) Scampoli–Bianchin	18–21	21–14	15–8	54–43	Report
18 Aug	18:00	Kravčenoka–Graudiņa (Latvia)	2–0	(Poland) Kociołek–Łodej	21–12	21–18		42–30	Report
18 Aug	18:00	Álvarez–Moreno (Spain)	2–1	(Italy) Breidenbach–Orsi Toth	16–21	21–19	15–11	52–51	Report
18 Aug	19:00	Bentele–Vergé-Dépré (Switzerland)	2–0	(Spain) Soria–González	21–18	21–14		42–32	Report
18 Aug	19:00	Stam–Schoon (Netherlands)	2–1	(Ukraine) Makhno–Makhno	21–15	19–21	15–9	55–45	Report
18 Aug	19:00	Laboureur–Schulz (Germany)	2–1	(Switzerland) Böbner–Vergé-Depré	18–21	21–13	15–9	54–43	Report
18 Aug	20:00	Ittlinger–Schneider (Germany)	1–2	(Italy) Menegatti–Gottardi	21–16	16–21	12–15	49–52	Report
18 Aug	21:00	Hüberli–Brunner (Switzerland)	2–0	(Denmark) Windeleff–Bisgaard	21–15	21–16		42–31	Report

==== Quarterfinals ====
Date	Time		Score		Set 1	Set 2	Set 3	Total	Report
19 Aug	10:00	Borger–Sude (Germany)	0–2	(Latvia) Kravčenoka–Graudiņa	18–21	18–21		36–42	Report
19 Aug	11:00	Bentele–Vergé-Dépré (Switzerland)	1–2	(Netherlands) Stam–Schoon	20–22	21–19	11–15	52–56	Report
19 Aug	12:15	Menegatti–Gottardi (Italy)	0–2	(Spain) Álvarez–Moreno	18–21	18–21		36–42	Report
19 Aug	13:15	Hüberli–Brunner (Switzerland)	2–0	(Germany) Laboureur–Schulz	21–12	21–15		42–27	Report

==== Semifinals ====
Date	Time		Score		Set 1	Set 2	Set 3	Total	Report
19 Aug	17:45	Stam–Schoon (Netherlands)	0–2	(Latvia) Kravčenoka–Graudiņa	13–21	19–21		32–42	Report
19 Aug	19:00	Hüberli–Brunner (Switzerland)	2–0	(Spain) Álvarez–Moreno	21–14	21–17		42–31	Report

==== Third place game ====
Date	Time		Score		Set 1	Set 2	Set 3	Total	Report
20 Aug	17:00	Stam–Schoon (Netherlands)	2–1	(Spain) Álvarez–Moreno	19–21	24–22	15–11	58–54	Report

==== Final ====
Date	Time		Score		Set 1	Set 2	Set 3	Total	Report
20 Aug	18:30	Kravčenoka–Graudiņa (Latvia)	2–1	(Switzerland) Hüberli–Brunner	18–21	21–15	15–11	54–47	Report
