= 2021 European Beach Volleyball Championships =

European Beach Volleyball Championship

Tournament details
- Host country: (Austria) Vienna
- Dates: 11–15 August
- Teams: 64

The 2021 European Beach Volleyball Championships is a 2021 edition of European Beach Volleyball Championship which is a unisex competition of national teams which took place from 11 to 15 August 2021 in Vienna in Austria. The draw consisted of 32 men's & 32 women's teams.

== Medal events ==
=== Medal table ===
* Host nation (Austria)

Rank	Nation	Gold	Silver	Bronze	Total
1	Norway	1	0	0	1
1	Switzerland	1	0	0	1
3	Netherlands	0	2	0	2
4	Germany	0	0	1	1
4	Poland	0	0	1	1
Totals (5 entries)		2	2	2	6

=== Medal summary ===
Event	Gold	Silver	Bronze
Men	Norway; Anders Mol; Christian Sørum	Netherlands; Stefan Boermans; Yorick de Groot	Poland; Piotr Kantor; Bartosz Łosiak
Women	Switzerland; Nina Betschart; Tanja Hüberli	Netherlands; Katja Stam; Raïsa Schoon	Germany; Karla Borger; Julia Sude

== Men's tournament ==
=== Preliminary round ===
==== Pool A ====
Pos	Team	Pld	W	L	Pts	SW	SL	SR	SPW	SPL	SPR	Qualification
1	Mol–Sørum (NOR)	2	2	0	4	4	1	4.000	98	78	1.256	Round of 16
2	Ayé–Gauthier-Rat (FRA)	2	1	1	3	3	3	1.000	105	100	1.050	Round of 24
3	Seid–Waller (AUT)	2	1	1	3	2	3	0.667	89	93	0.957	Round of 24
4	Heidrich–Métral (SUI)	2	0	2	2	2	4	0.500	95	116	0.819	

Source: cev.eu

Date	Time		Score		Set 1	Set 2	Set 3	Total	Report
12 Aug	10:45	Heidrich–Métral (Switzerland)	1–2	(Austria) Seid–Waller	16–21	21–19	12–15	49–55	Report
12 Aug	11:00	Mol–Sørum (Norway)	2–1	(France) Ayé–Gauthier-Rat	21–14	18–21	15–9	54–44	Report
12 Aug	17:00	Ayé–Gauthier-Rat (France)	2–1	(Switzerland) Heidrich–Métral	25–27	21–19	15–0 (R)	61–46	Report
12 Aug	19:15	Mol–Sørum (Norway)	2–0	(Austria) Seid–Waller	21–13	23–21		44–34	Report

==== Pool B ====
Pos	Team	Pld	W	L	Pts	SW	SL	SR	SPW	SPL	SPR	Qualification
1	Perušič–Schweiner (CZE)	2	2	0	4	4	1	4.000	100	85	1.176	Round of 16
2	Krattiger–Haussener (SUI)	2	1	1	3	2	2	1.000	86	78	1.103	Round of 24
3	Pļaviņš–Točs (LAT)	2	1	1	3	3	2	1.500	104	102	1.020	Round of 24
4	Doppler–Horst (AUT)	2	0	2	2	0	4	0.000	59	84	0.702	

Source: cev.eu

Date	Time		Score		Set 1	Set 2	Set 3	Total	Report
12 Aug	12:00	Krattiger–Haussener (Switzerland)	0–2	(Latvia) Pļaviņš–Točs	26–28	18–21		44–49	Report
12 Aug	12:45	Perušič–Schweiner (Czech Republic)	2–0	(Austria) Doppler–Horst	21–17	21–13		42–30	Report
12 Aug	18:00	Perušič–Schweiner (Czech Republic)	2–1	(Latvia) Pļaviņš–Točs	22–24	21–19	15–12	58–55	Report
12 Aug	20:30	Doppler–Horst (Austria)	0–2	(Switzerland) Krattiger–Haussener	17–21	12–21		29–42	Report

==== Pool C ====
Pos	Team	Pld	W	L	Pts	SW	SL	SR	SPW	SPL	SPR	Qualification
1	Lyamin–Myskiv (RUS)	2	2	0	4	4	1	4.000	109	98	1.112	Round of 16
2	Kantor–Łosiak (POL)	2	1	1	3	3	2	1.500	95	89	1.067	Round of 24
3	Samoilovs–Šmēdiņš (LAT)	2	1	1	3	2	2	1.000	98	96	1.021	Round of 24
4	Iemelianchyk–Popov (UKR)	2	0	2	2	0	4	0.000	76	95	0.800	

Source: cev.eu

Date	Time		Score		Set 1	Set 2	Set 3	Total	Report
12 Aug	09:00	Kantor–Łosiak (Poland)	2–0	(Ukraine) Iemelianchyk–Popov	21–11	21–18		42–29	Report
12 Aug	09:00	Samoilovs–Šmēdiņš (Latvia)	0–2	(Russia) Lyamin–Myskiv	25–27	20–22		45–49	Report
12 Aug	15:00	Kantor–Łosiak (Poland)	1–2	(Russia) Lyamin–Myskiv	26–24	19–21	8–15	53–60	Report
12 Aug	15:00	Iemelianchyk–Popov (Ukraine)	0–2	(Latvia) Samoilovs–Šmēdiņš	17–21	30–32		47–53	Report

==== Pool D ====
Pos	Team	Pld	W	L	Pts	SW	SL	SR	SPW	SPL	SPR	Qualification
1	Herrera–Gavira (ESP)	2	2	0	4	4	1	4.000	96	76	1.263	Round of 16
2	Szałankiewicz–Bryl (POL)	2	1	1	3	3	2	1.500	103	98	1.051	Round of 24
3	Carambula–Dal Corso (ITA)	2	1	1	3	2	3	0.667	77	88	0.875	Round of 24
4	Hörl–Leitner (AUT)	2	0	2	2	1	4	0.250	90	104	0.865	

Source: cev.eu

Date	Time		Score		Set 1	Set 2	Set 3	Total	Report
12 Aug	11:00	Szałankiewicz–Bryl (Poland)	1–2	(Spain) Herrera–Gavira	21–16	16–21	15–17	52–54	Report
12 Aug	12:00	Carambula–Dal Corso (Italy)	2–1	(Austria) Hörl–Leitner	21–15	17–21	15–10	53–46	Report
12 Aug	17:00	Hörl–Leitner (Austria)	0–2	(Poland) Szałankiewicz–Bryl	16–21	28–30		44–51	Report
12 Aug	18:00	Carambula–Dal Corso (Italy)	0–2	(Spain) Herrera–Gavira	9–21	15–21		24–42	Report

==== Pool E ====
Pos	Team	Pld	W	L	Pts	SW	SL	SR	SPW	SPL	SPR	Qualification
1	Brouwer–Meeuwsen (NED)	2	2	0	4	4	0	MAX	84	63	1.333	Round of 16
2	Ehlers–Pfretzschner (GER)	2	1	1	3	2	2	1.000	73	67	1.090	Round of 24
3	Boermans–de Groot (NED)	2	1	1	3	2	2	1.000	74	75	0.987	Round of 24
4	Huber–Dressler (AUT)	2	0	2	2	0	4	0.000	58	84	0.690	

Source: cev.eu

Date	Time		Score		Set 1	Set 2	Set 3	Total	Report
12 Aug	09:45	Boermans–de Groot (Netherlands)	2–0	(Austria) Huber–Dressler	21–15	21–18		42–33	Report
12 Aug	11:00	Brouwer–Meeuwsen (Netherlands)	2–0	(Germany) Ehlers–Pfretzschner	21–19	21–12		42–31	Report
12 Aug	17:00	Boermans–de Groot (Netherlands)	0–2	(Netherlands) Brouwer–Meeuwsen	17–21	15–21		32–42	Report
12 Aug	17:00	Huber–Dressler (Austria)	0–2	(Germany) Ehlers–Pfretzschner	13–21	12–21		25–42	Report

==== Pool F ====
Pos	Team	Pld	W	L	Pts	SW	SL	SR	SPW	SPL	SPR	Qualification
1	Thole–Wickler (GER)	2	2	0	4	4	1	4.000	98	79	1.241	Round of 16
2	Walkenhorst–Winter (GER)	2	1	1	3	2	2	1.000	73	74	0.986	Round of 24
3	Nicolai–Lupo (ITA)	2	1	1	3	3	2	1.500	91	95	0.958	Round of 24
4	Likholetov–Bykanov (RUS)	2	0	2	2	0	4	0.000	71	85	0.835	

Source: cev.eu

Date	Time		Score		Set 1	Set 2	Set 3	Total	Report
12 Aug	10:00	Nicolai–Lupo (Italy)	2–0	(Russia) Likholetov–Bykanov	21–19	22–20		43–39	Report
12 Aug	10:00	Thole–Wickler (Germany)	2–0	(Germany) Walkenhorst–Winter	21–12	21–19		42–31	Report
12 Aug	16:00	Nicolai–Lupo (Italy)	1–2	(Germany) Thole–Wickler	21–18	12–21	15–17	48–56	Report
12 Aug	16:00	Likholetov–Bykanov (Russia)	0–2	(Germany) Walkenhorst–Winter	14–21	18–21		32–42	Report

==== Pool G ====
Pos	Team	Pld	W	L	Pts	SW	SL	SR	SPW	SPL	SPR	Qualification
1	Varenhorst–van de Velde (NED)	2	2	0	4	4	2	2.000	117	103	1.136	Round of 16
2	Nõlvak–Tiisaar (EST)	2	1	1	3	2	2	1.000	87	88	0.989	Round of 24
3	Krasilnikov–Stoyanovskiy (RUS)	2	1	1	3	3	2	1.500	95	100	0.950	Round of 24
4	Windisch–Cottafava (ITA)	2	0	2	2	1	4	0.250	96	104	0.923	

Source: cev.eu

Date	Time		Score		Set 1	Set 2	Set 3	Total	Report
12 Aug	09:00	Krasilnikov–Stoyanovskiy (Russia)	2–0	(Estonia) Nõlvak–Tiisaar	21–18	28–26		49–44	Report
12 Aug	10:00	Varenhorst–van de Velde (Netherlands)	2–1	(Italy) Windisch–Cottafava	21–18	25–27	15–12	61–57	Report
12 Aug	15:00	Windisch–Cottafava (Italy)	0–2	(Estonia) Nõlvak–Tiisaar	19–21	20–22		39–43	Report
12 Aug	16:00	Varenhorst–van de Velde (Netherlands)	2–1	(Russia) Krasilnikov–Stoyanovskiy	21–12	20–22	15–12	56–46	Report

==== Pool H ====
Pos	Team	Pld	W	L	Pts	SW	SL	SR	SPW	SPL	SPR	Qualification
1	Koekelkoren–van Walle (BEL)	2	2	0	4	4	2	2.000	114	105	1.086	Round of 16
2	Semenov–Leshukov (RUS)	2	1	1	3	3	2	1.500	98	92	1.065	Round of 24
3	Dziadkou–Piatrushka (BLR)	2	1	1	3	2	2	1.000	72	75	0.960	Round of 24
4	Ermacora–Pristauz (AUT)	2	0	2	2	1	4	0.250	82	94	0.872	

Source: cev.eu

Date	Time		Score		Set 1	Set 2	Set 3	Total	Report
12 Aug	11:45	Ermacora–Pristauz (Austria)	1–2	(Belgium) Koekelkoren–van Walle	15–21	21–16	13–15	49–52	Report
12 Aug	12:00	Semenov–Leshukov (Russia)	2–0	(Belarus) Dziadkou–Piatrushka	21–11	21–19		42–30	Report
12 Aug	18:00	Koekelkoren–van Walle (Belgium)	2–1	(Russia) Semenov–Leshukov	28–26	19–21	15–9	62–56	Report
12 Aug	18:00	Ermacora–Pristauz (Austria)	0–2	(Belarus) Dziadkou–Piatrushka	17–21	16–21		33–42	Report

=== Knockout stage ===
==== Round of 24 ====
Date	Time		Score		Set 1	Set 2	Set 3	Total	Report
13 Aug	12:00	Krasilnikov–Stoyanovskiy (Russia)	2–0	(Switzerland) Krattiger–Haussener	21–18	21–14		42–32	Report
13 Aug	12:00	Kantor–Łosiak (Poland)	2–0	(Belarus) Dziadkou–Piatrushka	21–13	21–18		42–31	Report
13 Aug	12:00	Boermans–de Groot (Netherlands)	2–0	(Estonia) Nõlvak–Tiisaar	25–23	21–14		46–37	Report
13 Aug	12:00	Carambula–Dal Corso (Italy)	0–2	(Latvia) Samoilovs–Šmēdiņš	22–24	11–21		33–45	Report
13 Aug	13:00	Nicolai–Lupo (Italy)	2–1	(Poland) Szałankiewicz–Bryl	21–18	17–21	15–13	53–52	Report
13 Aug	13:00	Semenov–Leshukov (Russia)	2–1	(Germany) Walkenhorst–Winter	14–21	21–17	15–9	50–47	Report
13 Aug	13:00	Pļaviņš–Točs (Latvia)	2–0	(France) Ayé–Gauthier-Rat	21–15	21–19		42–34	Report
13 Aug	13:00	Seid–Waller (Austria)	1–2	(Germany) Ehlers–Pfretzschner	25–23	21–23	11–15	57–61	Report

==== Round of 16 ====
Date	Time		Score		Set 1	Set 2	Set 3	Total	Report
13 Aug	16:00	Koekelkoren–van Walle (Belgium)	0–2	(Netherlands) Boermans–de Groot	15–21	18–21		33–42	Report
13 Aug	16:00	Perušič–Schweiner (Czech Republic)	2–0	(Latvia) Samoilovs–Šmēdiņš	21–14	21–13		42–27	Report
13 Aug	17:00	Herrera–Gavira (Spain)	2–1	(Russia) Krasilnikov–Stoyanovskiy	21–16	19–21	15–12	55–49	Report
13 Aug	17:00	Thole–Wickler (Germany)	0–2	(Poland) Kantor–Łosiak	18–21	18–21		36–42	Report
13 Aug	18:00	Varenhorst–van de Velde (Netherlands)	0–2	(Russia) Semenov–Leshukov	13–21	19–21		32–42	Report
13 Aug	18:00	Lyamin–Myskiv (Russia)	0–2	(Germany) Ehlers–Pfretzschner	19–21	17–21		36–42	Report
13 Aug	19:45	Brouwer–Meeuwsen (Netherlands)	2–0	(Latvia) Pļaviņš–Točs	21–15	21–18		42–33	Report
13 Aug	21:00	Mol–Sørum (Norway)	2–0	(Italy) Nicolai–Lupo	21–18	29–27		50–45	Report

==== Quarterfinals ====
Date	Time		Score		Set 1	Set 2	Set 3	Total	Report
14 Aug	12:45	Herrera–Gavira (Spain)	0–2	(Poland) Kantor–Łosiak	18–21	19–21		37–42	Report
14 Aug	13:45	Boermans–de Groot (Netherlands)	2–1	(Czech Republic) Perušič–Schweiner	21–16	16–21	15–10	52–47	Report
14 Aug	20:00	Brouwer–Meeuwsen (Netherlands)	2–1	(Germany) Ehlers–Pfretzschner	21–19	13–21	15–11	49–51	Report
14 Aug	21:00	Mol–Sørum (Norway)	2–1	(Russia) Semenov–Leshukov	18–21	21–18	15–8	54–47	Report

==== Semifinals ====
Date	Time		Score		Set 1	Set 2	Set 3	Total	Report
15 Aug	12:00	Mol–Sørum (Norway)	2–1	(Netherlands) Brouwer–Meeuwsen	17–21	21–17	15–13	53–51	Report
15 Aug	13:00	Kantor–Łosiak (Poland)	0–2	(Netherlands) Boermans–de Groot	19–21	10–21		29-42	Report

==== Third place game ====
Date	Time		Score		Set 1	Set 2	Set 3	Total	Report
15 Aug	16:30	Brouwer–Meeuwsen (Netherlands)	0–2	(Poland) Kantor–Łosiak	14–21	19–21		33–42	Report

==== Final ====
Date	Time		Score		Set 1	Set 2	Set 3	Total	Report
15 Aug	17:45	Mol–Sørum (Norway)	2–1	(Netherlands) Boermans–de Groot	21–19	24–26	15–12	60–57	Report

== Women's tournament ==
=== Preliminary round ===
==== Pool A ====
Pos	Team	Pld	W	L	Pts	SW	SL	SR	SPW	SPL	SPR	Qualification
1	van Iersel–Ypma (NED)	2	2	0	4	4	1	4.000	89	77	1.156	Round of 16
2	Lehtonen–Ahtiainen (FIN)	2	1	1	3	3	2	1.500	92	76	1.211	Round of 24
3	Ceynowa–Gruszczyńska (POL)	2	1	1	3	2	3	0.667	82	86	0.953	Round of 24
4	Parkkinen–Lahti (FIN)	2	0	2	2	1	4	0.250	73	97	0.753	

Source: cev.eu

Date	Time		Score		Set 1	Set 2	Set 3	Total	Report
11 Aug	12:00	Ceynowa–Gruszczyńska (Poland)	2–1	(Finland) Parkkinen–Lahti	11–21	21–15	15–11	55–44	Report
11 Aug	12:00	van Iersel–Ypma (Netherlands)	2–1	(Finland) Lehtonen–Ahtiainen	11–21	21–19	15–10	47–50	Report
11 Aug	16:00	Ceynowa–Gruszczyńska (Poland)	0–2	(Netherlands) van Iersel–Ypma	9–21	18–21		27–42	Report
11 Aug	16:00	Parkkinen–Lahti (Finland)	0–2	(Finland) Lehtonen–Ahtiainen	14–21	15–21		29–42	Report

==== Pool B ====
Pos	Team	Pld	W	L	Pts	SW	SL	SR	SPW	SPL	SPR	Qualification
1	Dabizha–Kholomina (RUS)	2	2	0	4	4	1	4.000	100	87	1.149	Round of 16
2	Stam–Schoon (NED)	2	1	1	3	2	2	1.000	73	61	1.197	Round of 24
3	Böbner–Vergé-Dépré (SUI)	2	1	1	3	2	2	1.000	81	77	1.052	Round of 24
4	Strauss–Dörfler (AUT)	2	0	2	2	1	4	0.250	67	96	0.698	

Source: cev.eu

Date	Time		Score		Set 1	Set 2	Set 3	Total	Report
11 Aug	12:45	Dabizha–Kholomina (Russia)	2–1	(Austria) Strauss–Dörfler	21–18	18–21	15–9	54–48	Report
11 Aug	13:00	Stam–Schoon (Netherlands)	0–2	(Switzerland) Böbner–Vergé-Dépré	16–21	15–21		31–42	Report
11 Aug	17:00	Dabizha–Kholomina (Russia)	2–0	(Switzerland) Böbner–Vergé-Dépré	25–23	21–16		46–39	Report
11 Aug	20:00	Strauss–Dörfler (Austria)	0–2	(Netherlands) Stam–Schoon	5–21	14–21		19–42	Report

==== Pool C ====
Pos	Team	Pld	W	L	Pts	SW	SL	SR	SPW	SPL	SPR	Qualification
1	Betschart–Hüberli (SUI)	2	2	0	4	4	1	4.000	94	69	1.362	Round of 16
2	Behrens–Ittlinger (GER)	2	1	1	3	2	2	1.000	71	68	1.044	Round of 24
3	Bocharova–Voronina (RUS)	2	1	1	3	2	3	0.667	75	94	0.798	Round of 24
4	Hjortland–Helland-Hansen (NOR)	2	0	2	2	2	4	0.500	96	101	0.950	

Source: cev.eu

Date	Time		Score		Set 1	Set 2	Set 3	Total	Report
11 Aug	11:00	Behrens–Ittlinger (Germany)	2–0	(Russia) Bocharova–Voronina	21–14	21–12		42–26	Report
11 Aug	11:00	Betschart–Hüberli (Switzerland)	2–1	(Norway) Hjortland–Helland-Hansen	16–21	21–10	15–9	52–40	Report
11 Aug	14:45	Betschart–Hüberli (Switzerland)	2–0	(Germany) Behrens–Ittlinger	21–16	21–13		42–29	Report
11 Aug	15:00	Hjortland–Helland-Hansen (Norway)	1–2	(Russia) Bocharova–Voronina	21–23	21–11	12–15	54–49	Report

==== Pool D ====
Pos	Team	Pld	W	L	Pts	SW	SL	SR	SPW	SPL	SPR	Qualification
1	Kravčenoka–Graudiņa (LAT)	2	2	0	4	4	0	MAX	84	68	1.235	Round of 16
2	Soria–Carro (ESP)	2	1	1	3	2	2	1.000	83	78	1.064	Round of 24
3	Wojtasik–Kociołek (POL)	2	1	1	3	2	2	1.000	79	83	0.952	Round of 24
4	Placette–Richard (FRA)	2	0	2	2	0	4	0.000	67	84	0.798	

Source: cev.eu

Date	Time		Score		Set 1	Set 2	Set 3	Total	Report
11 Aug	13:00	Kravčenoka–Graudiņa (Latvia)	2–0	(France) Placette–Richard	21–17	21–17		42–34	Report
11 Aug	13:00	Wojtasik–Kociołek (Poland)	2–0	(Spain) Soria–Carro	21–19	24–22		45–41	Report
11 Aug	17:00	Kravčenoka–Graudiņa (Latvia)	2–0	(Poland) Wojtasik–Kociołek	21–18	21–16		42–34	Report
11 Aug	18:00	Placette–Richard (France)	0–2	(Spain) Soria–Carro	16–21	17–21		33–42	Report

==== Pool E ====
Pos	Team	Pld	W	L	Pts	SW	SL	SR	SPW	SPL	SPR	Qualification
1	Borger–Sude (GER)	2	2	0	4	4	1	4.000	95	80	1.188	Round of 16
2	Hermannová–Štochlová (CZE)	2	1	1	3	3	3	1.000	104	104	1.000	Round of 24
3	Lunde–Olimstad (NOR)	2	1	1	3	3	2	1.500	94	95	0.989	Round of 24
4	Lobato–Álvarez (ESP)	2	0	2	2	0	4	0.000	71	85	0.835	

Source: cev.eu

Date	Time		Score		Set 1	Set 2	Set 3	Total	Report
11 Aug	10:00	Borger–Sude (Germany)	2–0	(Spain) Lobato–Álvarez	21–18	21–16		42–34	Report
11 Aug	10:00	Hermannová–Štochlová (Czech Republic)	2–1	(Norway) Lunde–Olimstad	21–23	21–14	16–14	58–51	Report
11 Aug	15:00	Hermannová–Štochlová (Czech Republic)	1–2	(Germany) Borger–Sude	21–17	17–21	8–15	46–53	Report
11 Aug	15:00	Lunde–Olimstad (Norway)	2–0	(Spain) Lobato–Álvarez	22–20	21–17		43–37	Report

==== Pool F ====
Pos	Team	Pld	W	L	Pts	SW	SL	SR	SPW	SPL	SPR	Qualification
1	Keizer–Meppelink (NED)	2	2	0	4	4	1	4.000	92	81	1.136	Round of 16
2	Bieneck–Schneider (GER)	2	1	1	3	3	2	1.500	92	81	1.136	Round of 24
3	Arvaniti–Karagkouni (GRE)	2	1	1	3	2	2	1.000	73	73	1.000	Round of 24
4	Friedl–Pfeffer (AUT)	2	0	2	2	0	4	0.000	62	84	0.738	

Source: cev.eu

Date	Time		Score		Set 1	Set 2	Set 3	Total	Report
11 Aug	10:45	Keizer–Meppelink (Netherlands)	2–0	(Austria) Friedl–Pfeffer	21–18	21–13		42–31	Report
11 Aug	11:00	Bieneck–Schneider (Germany)	2–0	(Greece) Arvaniti–Karagkouni	21–15	21–16		42–31	Report
11 Aug	16:00	Keizer–Meppelink (Netherlands)	2–1	(Germany) Bieneck–Schneider	21–18	14–21	15–11	50–50	Report
11 Aug	18:00	Friedl–Pfeffer (Austria)	0–2	(Greece) Arvaniti–Karagkouni	19–21	12–21		31–42	Report

==== Pool G ====
Pos	Team	Pld	W	L	Pts	SW	SL	SR	SPW	SPL	SPR	Qualification
1	Laboureur–Tillmann (GER)	2	2	0	4	4	2	2.000	108	91	1.187	Round of 16
2	Birlova–Frolova (RUS)	2	1	1	3	2	3	0.667	101	100	1.010	Round of 24
3	Menegatti–Orsi Toth (ITA)	2	1	1	3	3	2	1.500	94	95	0.989	Round of 24
4	D. Klinger–R. Klinger (AUT)	2	0	2	2	2	4	0.500	97	114	0.851	

Source: cev.eu

Date	Time		Score		Set 1	Set 2	Set 3	Total	Report
11 Aug	11:45	Laboureur–Tillmann (Germany)	2–1	(Austria) D. Klinger–R. Klinger	21–13	19–21	15–10	55–44	Report
11 Aug	12:00	Menegatti–Orsi Toth (Italy)	2–0	(Russia) Birlova–Frolova	21–18	26–24		47–42	Report
11 Aug	17:00	Laboureur–Tillmann (Germany)	2–1	(Italy) Menegatti–Orsi Toth	17–21	21–16	15–10	53–47	Report
11 Aug	19:00	D. Klinger–R. Klinger (Austria)	1–2	(Russia) Birlova–Frolova	20–22	24–22	9–15	53–59	Report

==== Pool H ====
Pos	Team	Pld	W	L	Pts	SW	SL	SR	SPW	SPL	SPR	Qualification
1	In. Makhno–Ir. Makhno (UKR)	2	2	0	4	4	1	4.000	95	85	1.118	Round of 16
2	Kvapilová–Williams (CZE)	2	1	1	3	3	2	1.500	93	88	1.057	Round of 24
3	Schützenhöfer–Plesiutschnig (AUT)	2	1	1	3	3	3	1.000	106	104	1.019	Round of 24
4	Davidova–Lunina (UKR)	2	0	2	2	0	4	0.000	67	84	0.798	

Source: cev.eu

Date	Time		Score		Set 1	Set 2	Set 3	Total	Report
11 Aug	13:45	Schützenhöfer–Plesiutschnig (Austria)	2–1	(Czech Republic) Kvapilová–Williams	21–18	19–21	15–12	55–51	Report
11 Aug	14:00	Davidova–Lunina (Ukraine)	0–2	(Ukraine) In. Makhno–Ir. Makhno	19–21	15–21		34–42	Report
11 Aug	18:00	Kvapilová–Williams (Czech Republic)	2–0	(Ukraine) Davidova–Lunina	21–19	21–14		42–33	Report
11 Aug	21:00	Schützenhöfer–Plesiutschnig (Austria)	1–2	(Ukraine) In. Makhno–Ir. Makhno	17–21	21–17	13–15	51–53	Report

=== Knockout stage ===
==== Round of 24 ====
Date	Time		Score		Set 1	Set 2	Set 3	Total	Report
12 Aug	13:00	Bieneck–Schneider (Germany)	2–0	(Russia) Bocharova–Voronina	21–13	21–12		42–25	Report
12 Aug	13:00	Hermannová–Štochlová (Czech Republic)	2–0	(Czech Republic) Kvapilová–Williams	21–18	21–14		42–32	Report
12 Aug	13:00	Wojtasik–Kociołek (Poland)	2–0	(Finland) Lehtonen–Ahtiainen	21–18	21–16		42–34	Report
12 Aug	13:45	Menegatti–Orsi Toth (Italy)	1–2	(Netherlands) Stam–Schoon	21–19	14–21	13–15	48–55	Report
12 Aug	14:00	Behrens–Ittlinger (Germany)	2–0	(Norway) Lunde–Olimstad	22–20	21–15		43–35	Report
12 Aug	14:00	Böbner–Vergé-Dépré (Switzerland)	2–0	(Russia) Birlova–Frolova					Report
12 Aug	14:00	Ceynowa–Gruszczyńska (Poland)	0–2	(Spain) Soria–Carro	19–21	13–21		32–42	Report
12 Aug	16:00	Schützenhöfer–Plesiutschnig (Austria)	2–0	(Greece) Arvaniti–Karagkouni	21–16	21–19		42–35	Report

==== Round of 16 ====
Date	Time		Score		Set 1	Set 2	Set 3	Total	Report
13 Aug	09:45	Laboureur–Tillmann (Germany)	2–0	(Austria) Schützenhöfer–Plesiutschnig	21–15	21–17		42–32	Report
13 Aug	10:00	van Iersel–Ypma (Netherlands)	0–2	(Netherlands) Stam–Schoon	16–21	15–21		31–42	Report
13 Aug	10:00	In. Makhno–Ir. Makhno (Ukraine)	0–2	(Germany) Bieneck–Schneider	13–21	15–21		28–42	Report
13 Aug	10:00	Kravčenoka–Graudiņa (Latvia)	2–0	(Czech Republic) Hermannová–Štochlová	21–17	21–18		42–35	Report
13 Aug	10:45	Borger–Sude (Germany)	2–1	(Switzerland) Böbner–Vergé-Dépré	21–12	15–21	15–11	51–44	Report
13 Aug	11:00	Betschart–Hüberli (Switzerland)	2–0	(Poland) Wojtasik–Kociołek	21–13	21–17		42–30	Report
13 Aug	11:00	Keizer–Meppelink (Netherlands)	2–0	(Germany) Behrens–Ittlinger	21–17	21–15		42–32	Report
13 Aug	11:00	Dabizha–Kholomina (Russia)	2–1	(Spain) Soria–Carro	20–22	21–17	19–17	60–56	Report

==== Quarterfinals ====
Date	Time		Score		Set 1	Set 2	Set 3	Total	Report
13 Aug	14:00	Laboureur–Tillmann (Germany)	1–2	(Latvia) Kravčenoka–Graudiņa	21–13	16–21	13–15	50–49	Report
13 Aug	16:30	Stam–Schoon (Netherlands)	2–0	(Germany) Bieneck–Schneider	21–19	23–21		44–40	Report
13 Aug	17:30	Borger–Sude (Germany)	2–0	(Russia) Dabizha–Kholomina	21–18	21–19		42–37	Report
13 Aug	18:30	Betschart–Hüberli (Switzerland)	2–0	(Netherlands) Keizer–Meppelink	22–20	21–19		43–39	Report

==== Semifinals ====
Date	Time		Score		Set 1	Set 2	Set 3	Total	Report
14 Aug	10:45	Stam–Schoon (Netherlands)	2–1	(Latvia) Kravčenoka–Graudiņa	21–15	15–21	15–11	51–47	Report
14 Aug	11:45	Betschart–Hüberli (Switzerland)	2–1	(Germany) Borger–Sude	21–9	22–24	16–14	59–47	Report

==== Third place game ====
Date	Time		Score		Set 1	Set 2	Set 3	Total	Report
14 Aug	16:30	Kravčenoka–Graudiņa (Latvia)	1–2	(Germany) Borger–Sude	21–14	17–21	8–15	46–50	Report

==== Final ====
Date	Time		Score		Set 1	Set 2	Set 3	Total	Report
14 Aug	17:45	Stam–Schoon (Netherlands)	0–2	(Switzerland) Betschart–Hüberli	15–21	12–21		27–42	Report
