= Piotr Kantor =

Polish beach volleyball player (born 1992)

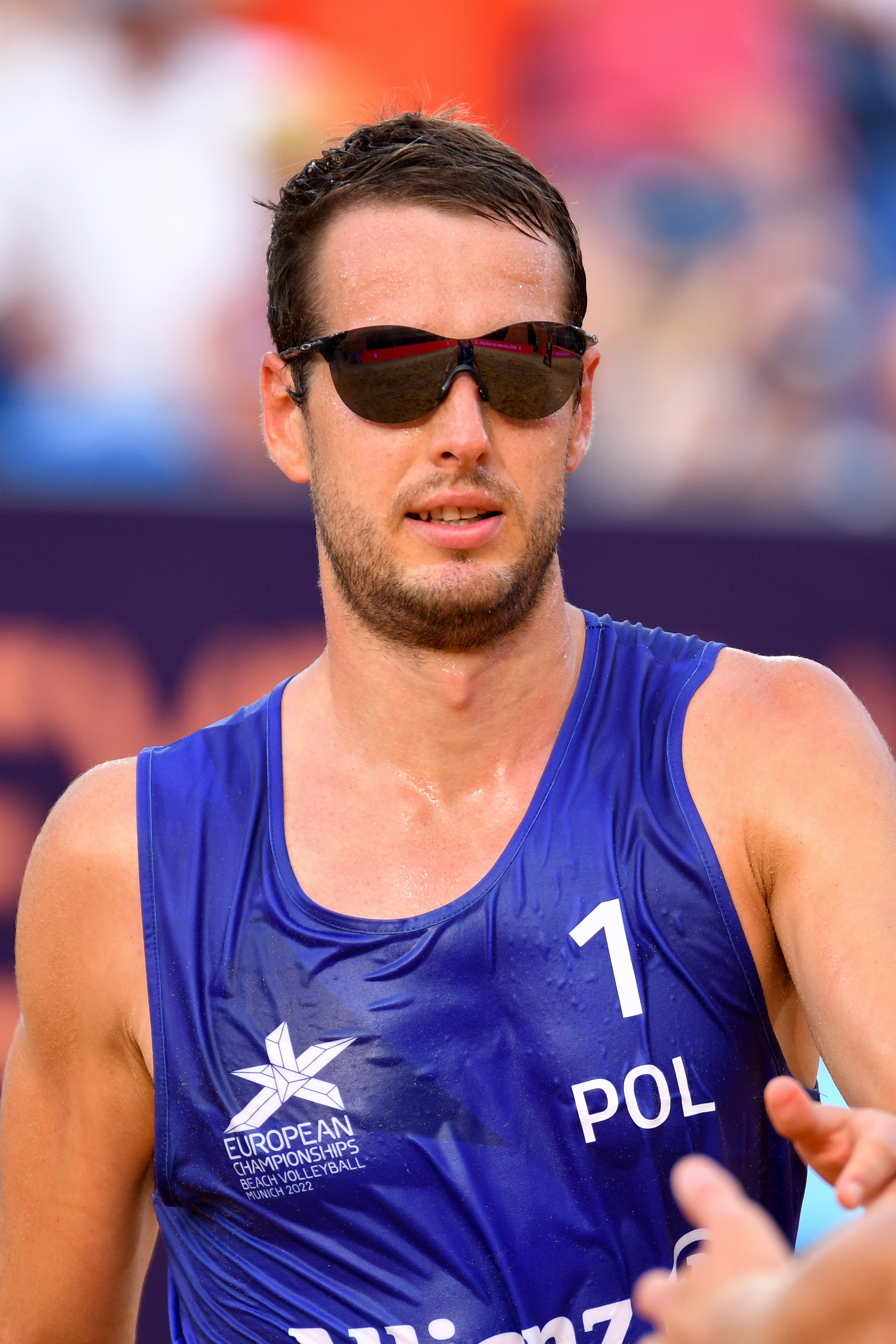

Personal information
- Nationality: Poland
- Born: 3 May 1992 (age 34); Sosnowiec, Poland
- Height: m
- Weight: 90 kg (198 lb)
Honours
Men's beach volleyball
Representing Poland
European Championship
Bronze medal – third place	2021 Vienna	Men's tournament

Piotr Kantor (born 3 May 1992) is a Polish Olympic beach volleyball player.

Kantor participated in 2016 Summer Olympics in Rio de Janeiro, Brazil as well as in 2020 Summer Olympics in Tokyo, Japan.

Awards
Preceded by Lombardo Ontiveros (MEX)	Men's FIVB World Tour "Most Improved"; 2016	Succeeded by Sam Pedlow (CAN)
