= Katja Stam =

Dutch beach volleyball player (born 1998)

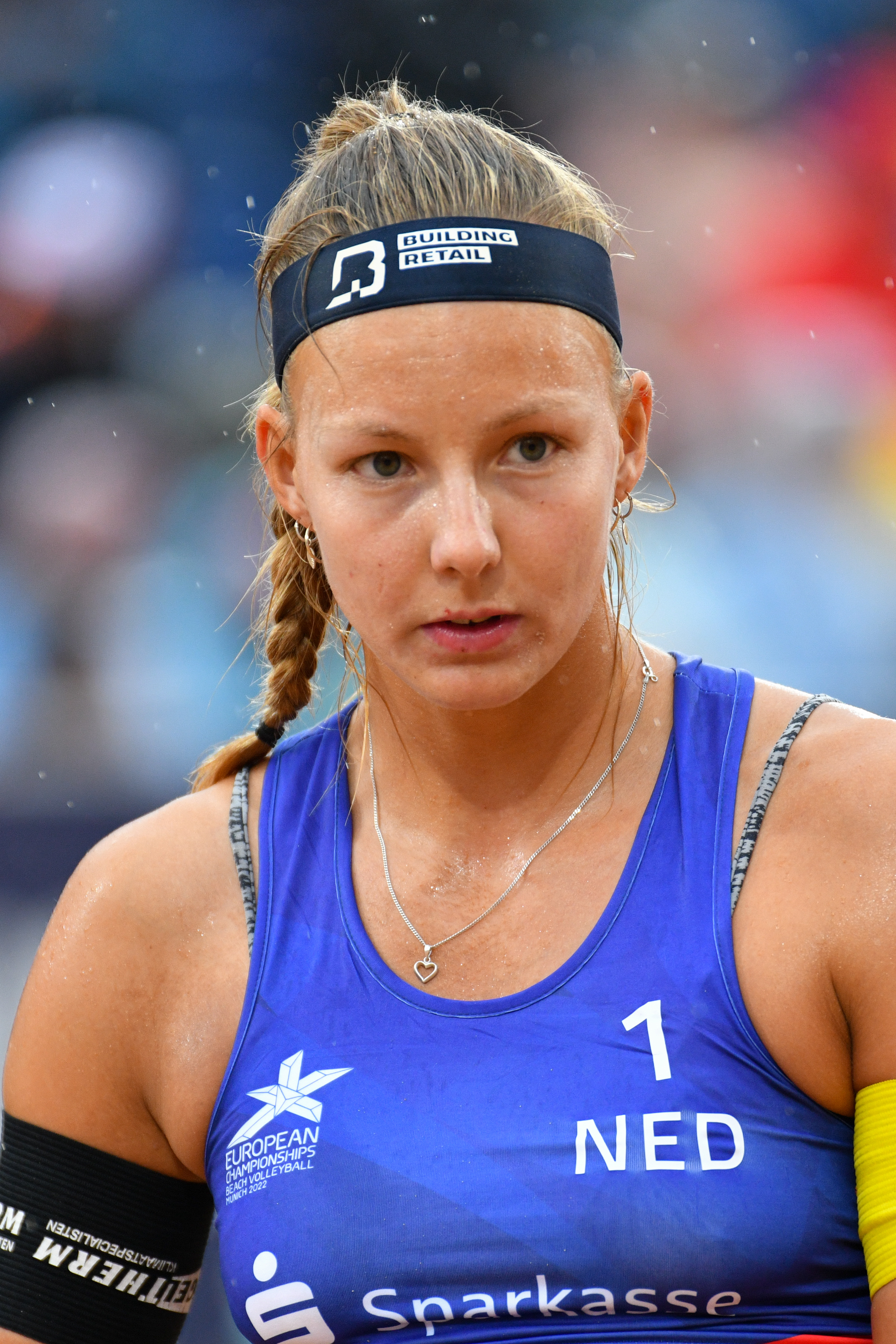
- Stam in 2022

Personal information
- Nationality: Netherlands
- Born: 3 October 1998 (age 27) Emmen, Netherlands
- Height: 1.92 m (6 ft 4 in)
- Weight: 76 kg (168 lb)

Sport
- Sport: Beach volleyball
Medal record
Women's beach volleyball
Representing the Netherlands
European Championships
Gold medal – first place	2026 Stare Jabłonki	Beach
Silver medal – second place	2021 Vienna	Beach
Bronze medal – third place	2022 Munich	Beach

Katja Stam (born 3 October 1998) is a Dutch beach volleyball player. She competed in the 2020 Summer Olympics. Stam shares the same birthday with her partner Raïsa Schoon.
