= Raïsa Schoon =

Dutch beach volleyball player (born 2001)

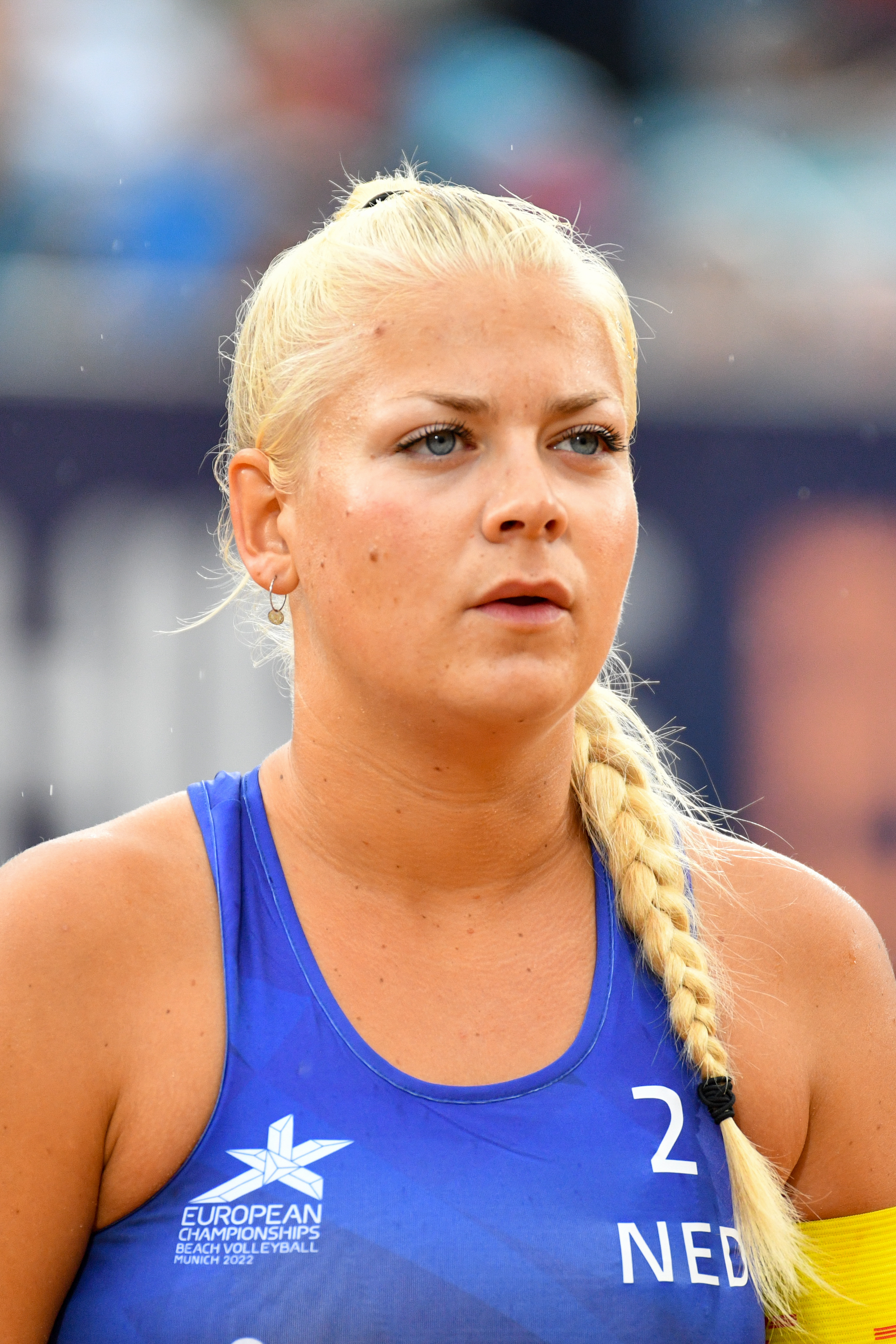
- 2022 in Munich

Personal information
- Nationality: Netherlands
- Born: 3 October 2001 (age 24)
- Height: 1.74 m (5 ft 9 in)

Sport
- Sport: Beach volleyball
Medal record
Women's beach volleyball
Representing the Netherlands
European Championships
Gold medal – first place	2026 Stare Jabłonki	Beach
Silver medal – second place	2021 Vienna	Beach
Bronze medal – third place	2022 Munich	Beach

Raïsa Schoon (born 3 October 2001) is a Dutch beach volleyball player. She competed in the 2020 Summer Olympics. Schoon shares the same birthday with her partner Katja Stam.
