= Ieva Dumbauskaitė =

Lithuanian beach volleyball player (born 1994)

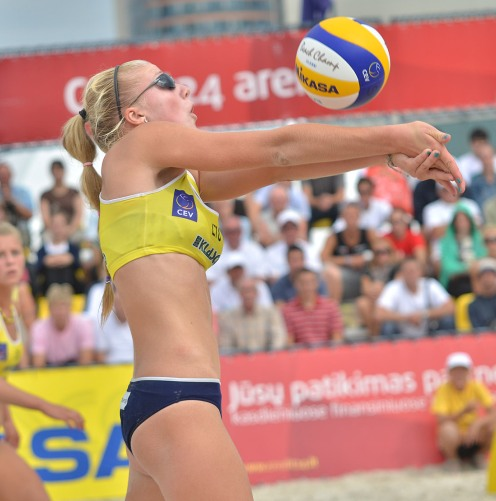
- Lithuanian beach volleyball player Ieva Dumbauskaitė

Personal information
- Full name: Ieva Dumbauskaitė
- Born: September 7, 1994 (age 32); Klaipėda, Lithuania

Beach volleyball information

Current teammate
Teammate
Monika Povilaitytė (1,443)

Previous teammates
Years	Teammate	Tours (points)
2010; 2009	Ieva Kažuraitytė; Rūta Bukantyitė	(0); 0)
Honours
Women's beach volleyball
Representing Lithuania
European Games
Bronze medal – third place	2015 Baku	Team
World Youth Championships
Gold medal – first place	2012 Larnaca	Team
European U20 Championships
Bronze medal – third place	2012 Hartberg	Team
European U18 Championships
Gold medal – first place	2011 Vilnius	Team

Ieva Dumbauskaitė (born 7 September 1994, in Klaipėda) is a Lithuanian beach volleyball player.

In 2013 Dumbauskaitė and Monika Povilaitytė became the first Lithuanian beach volleyball players to qualify for the world championships. In 2014 the two were nominated for Best Female Team of the Year at the Lithuanian Sportsperson of the Year awards, but lost to the rowers Milda Valčiukaitė and Donata Vištartaitė.
