= Amaranta Fernández =

Spanish volleyball player (born 1983)

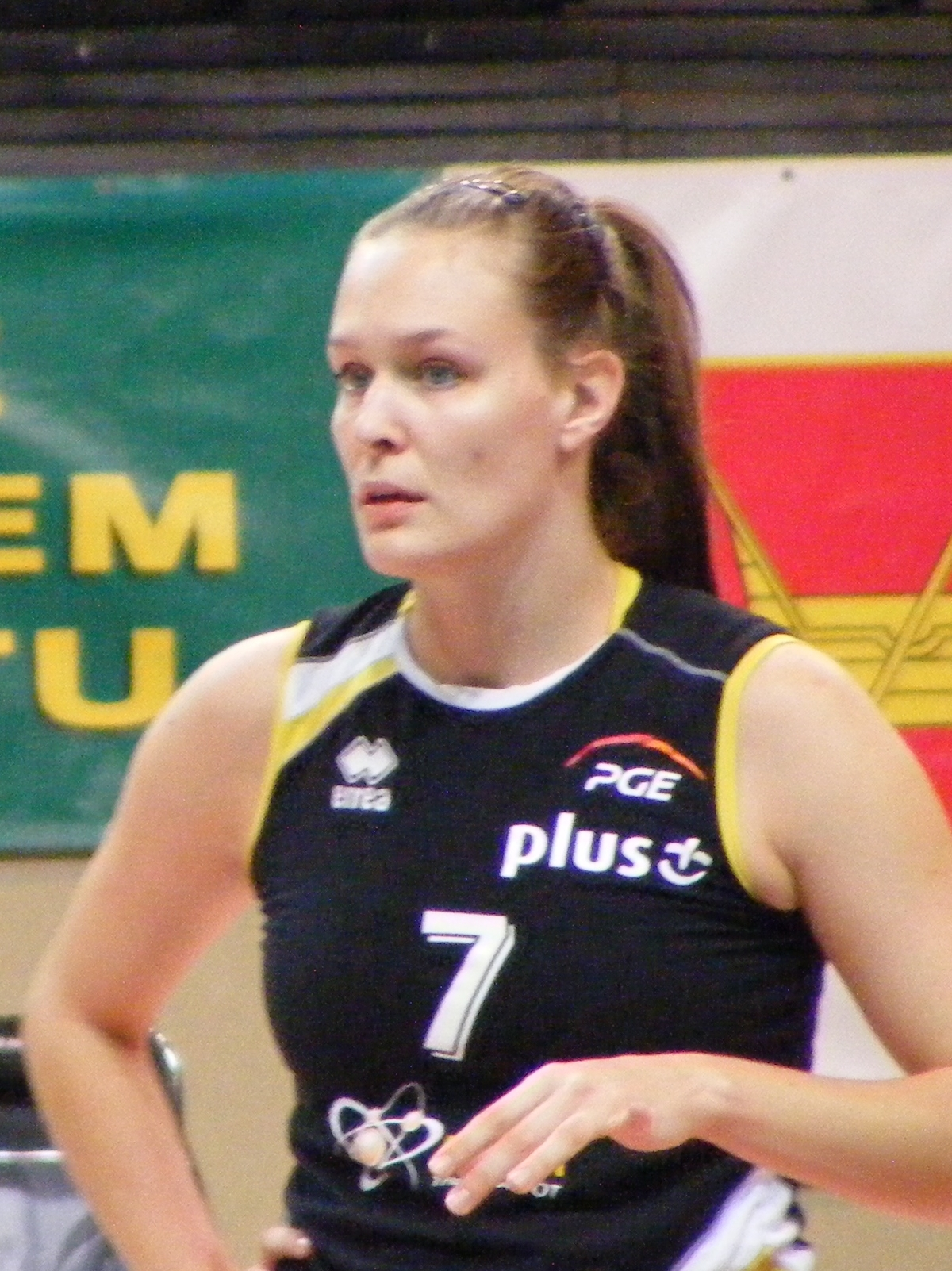
- Amaranta Fernandez Organika Cup 2010

Personal information
- Full name: Amaranta Fernández Navarro
- Nationality: Spanish
- Born: 11 August 1983 (age 43); Mataró, Spain
- Height: 189 cm (74 in)
- Weight: 79 kg (174 lb)

Volleyball information
- Position: central
- Number: 7 (national team)

Career
Years	Teams
2011	(Poland) Atom Trefl Sopot

National team
2011	Spain

Amaranta Fernández Navarro (born 11 August 1983) is a Spanish former volleyball player, playing as a central. She was part of the Spain women's national volleyball team.

She competed at the 2011 Women's European Volleyball Championship. On club level she played for Atom Trefl Sopot.
