= Alexander Huber (beach volleyball) =

Austrian beach volleyball player

Personal information
- Nickname: Xandi
- Born: 25 July 1985 (age 41) Klagenfurt, Austria
- Height: 179 cm (5 ft 10 in)
- Weight: 65 kg (143 lb)

Sport
- Country: Austria
- Sport: Beach volleyball

Alexander Huber (born 25 July 1985) is an Austrian beach volleyball player.

He competed at the 2016 Summer Olympics in Rio de Janeiro, Brazil in the men's beach volleyball tournament. At just 179 cm (5 ft 10 in), he is one of the shortest players at the World Tour.
