= Inna Makhno =

Ukrainian beach volleyball player

Personal information
- Nationality: Ukrainian
- Born: 15 October 1994 (age 31) Kremenchuk, Ukraine
- Height: 1.79 m (5 ft 10 in)
- Weight: 66 kg (146 lb)

Sport
- Sport: Beach volleyball
Medal record
Women's beach volleyball
Representing Ukraine
Volleyball World Beach Pro Tour
Gold medal – first place	2022	Baden Future
Bronze medal – third place	2023	Warsaw Future II
Bronze medal – third place	2024	Warsaw Future
FIVB Beach Volleyball World Tour
Gold medal – first place	2019	Ljubljana Open
Silver medal – second place	2018	Porec Open
Silver medal – second place	2018	Ljubljana Open
Silver medal – second place	2019	Göteborg Open

Inna Makhno (born 15 October 1994) is a Ukrainian beach volleyball player.

== Career ==
Since 2010, a partner was her sister Iryna Makhno.

They represented Ukraine at the 2015 European Games in Baku, competing in Group G.

Also Makno competed at the 2017 European Beach Volleyball Championships without reaching a round of 16th.

Their first achievement in beach volleyball competition was silver medals at the FIVB Beach Volleyball World Tour in 2018, held in Poreč and Ljubljana. They also competed at the 2019 FIVB Beach Volleyball World Tour winning gold and silver medals.

At the 2021 European Beach Volleyball Championships Inna and Iryna Makhno reached quarterfinals, but they lost in this stage. They repeated this achievement at the 2022 European Beach Volleyball Championships.

In 2023, Sofiia Rylova became her partner, and they competed at the 2023 Volleyball World Beach Pro Tour, winning a bronze medal.
