= Peny Karagkouni =

Greek volleyball player

Panagiota "Peny" Karagkouni

Personal information
- Full name: Panagiota Karagkouni
- Nickname: Peny Karagkouni
- Nationality: Greek
- Born: January 7, 1993 (age 33); Maroussi, Athens
- Hometown: Athens, Greece
- Height: 1.87 m (6 ft 1 1/2 in)
- Weight: 72 kg (159 lb)
- Spike: 279 cm (110 in)
- Block: 270 cm (110 in)

Beach volleyball information

Current teammate
Teammate
Pigi-Anna Metheniti

Indoor volleyball information
- Position: Outside hitter

Career
Years	Teams
2008–2013	Iraklis Kifissias
2019-2020	AEK
2021	Panathinaikos

National team
2007–2013	Greece (U17); Greece (U19); Greece
Honours
Gold medal – first place	2013 Greek Championship
Silver medal – second place	2013 Mediterranean Games
Silver medal – second place	2014 Greek Championship
Silver medal – second place	2015 Greek Championship
Bronze medal – third place	2019 Mediterranean Beach Games

Panagiota "Peny" Karagkouni (Greek: Παναγιώτα Καραγκούνη; born July 1, 1993) is a Greek beach volleyball player. Her debut appearance in beach volleyball tournaments was in 2013, when she replaced Maria Tsiartsiani as Vicky Arvaniti's partner.

In her first season in beach volleyball, and despite being the new member of the team, she managed (with Vicky Arvaniti) to finish 5th in the finals of the European Championship held in Klagenfurt, Austria hosted by CEV.

Her greatest achievement to date has been the silver medal she gained with Vassiliki Arvaniti at the XVII Mediterranean Games held at Mersin, Turkey.

In addition, on 28 July 2013 she won the Greek Championship held in Athens and she – along with Arvaniti – was the player who would represent the Greek National Team in all international competitions for the following year.

She reached her first important FIVB milestone on 14 December 2013, by obtaining the 9th position at the FIVB Beach Volleyball Durban Open for the first time in her career, this being the greatest achievement for the team since she partnered up with Vicky Arvaniti.

In April 2014, Maria Tsiartsiani returned to action after a successful surgery on the right shoulder and only a few months after she had given birth to her first child, and she teamed up with her ex-teammate Arvaniti.

Consequently, Peny took part at the Continental Cup round 1 hosted by CEV as being the second Greek team partnering Evangelia Christou this time and managed to obtain the first place, which gave the Greek national teams the opportunity to compete at the second stage of the tournament that would lead to the Olympic Games of Rio 2016.

Soon after this, she teamed up with Pigi-Anna Metheniti (with whom she played until late 2015) and a few weeks later they managed to finish 2nd in the Greek Championship behind Arvaniti/Tsiartsiani.

During the second season of the Greek duo, they took part in the first European Games held in Baku where they managed to finish 17th in their international debut.

Moreover, during the same year, they finished 2nd in the Greek Championship, losing 2–1 to Arvaniti/Tsiartsiani at a "repeat" final as of 2014. Also, they took part in two tournaments for the Balkan Championship in Burhaniye and Thessaloniki finishing third and second respectively. Finally, she competed in the CEV Continental Cup Rounds 3 and 4 where she got the second place, getting a ticket for the finals of the competition which will be held in Stavanger, Norway in June 2016.

== Early life ==
Born in Athens, Karagkouni started playing volleyball at the age of 6 for Iraklis Kifissias, and in 2008 she got promoted to the women's first team even though she was only 15.

She has won 9 Greek Championships in indoor volleyball with Iraklis Kifissias at the U15, U17 and U19 categories. For some years, she used to play at all three categories at the same time. In addition, "Peny" was playing as a libero player for 9 years and as an outside hitter for another 3.

At a very young age, Karagkouni started representing the Greek national team in indoor volleyball taking part in various international championships. While being a member of the U17 and U19 Greek national teams, her position was libero even though she had started playing as an outside hitter over the last years of her career in volleyball. She counts 75 appearances with all national teams.

After five successful years with the Greek team, she started playing beach volleyball as a partner of Vassiliki Arvaniti.

Karagkouni is studying philosophy, Pedagogy and Psychology at the University of Athens since 2011.

== Distinctions ==
Year	Event	Location	Position	Teammate
2013	FIVB Masters	Baden, AUT	13th	Vicky Arvaniti
2013	CEV European Championship Finals	Klagenfurt, AUT	5th	Vicky Arvaniti
2013	Mediterranean Games	Mersin, TUR	2nd	Vicky Arvaniti
2013	FIVB Open	Durban, RSA	9th	Vicky Arvaniti
2013	Greek Championship	Athens, GR	1st	Vicky Arvaniti
2014	CEV Continental Cup round 1	Athens, GR	1st	Evangelia Christou
2014	Greek Championship	Alexandroupolis, GR	2nd	Pigi-Anna Metheniti
2015	CEV Continental Cup round 3	Thessaloniki, GR	2nd	Pigi-Anna Metheniti
2015	Balkan Championship	Burhaniye, TUR	3rd	Pigi-Anna Metheniti
2015	First European Games Baku 2015	Baku, AZE	17th	Pigi-Anna Metheniti
2015	Greek Championship	Vegoritida Lake, GR	2nd	Pigi-Anna Metheniti
2015	Balkan Championship	Thessaloniki, GR	2nd	Pigi-Anna Metheniti
2015	CEV Continental Cup round 4	Thessaloniki, GR	2nd	Pigi-Anna Metheniti
