= Iryna Makhno =

Ukrainian beach volleyball player

Personal information
- Nationality: Ukrainian
- Born: 15 October 1994 (age 31) Kremenchuk, Ukraine
- Height: 1.79 m (5 ft 10 in)

Sport
- Sport: Beach volleyball
Medal record
Women's beach volleyball
Representing Ukraine
Volleyball World Beach Pro Tour
| Gold medal – first place | 2022 | Baden Future |
FIVB Beach Volleyball World Tour
| Gold medal – first place | 2019 | Ljubljana Open |
| Silver medal – second place | 2018 | Porec Open |
| Silver medal – second place | 2018 | Ljubljana Open |
| Silver medal – second place | 2019 | Göteborg Open |

Iryna Makhno (born 15 October 1994) is a Ukrainian beach volleyball player. Inna Makhno is her sister, Ukrainian beach volleyball player.

== Career ==
Since 2010, a partner was her sister Inna Makhno.

Representing Ukraine, they competed at the 2015 European Games, held in Baku, in Group G.

Also Makno's sisters competed at the 2017 European Beach Volleyball Championships without reaching a round of 16th.

Their first achievement in beach volleyball competition was silver medals at the FIVB Beach Volleyball World Tour in 2018, held in Poreč and Ljubljana. They also competed at the 2019 FIVB Beach Volleyball World Tour winning gold and silver medals.

At the 2021 European Beach Volleyball Championships Inna and Iryna Makhno reached quarterfinals, but they lost in this stage. They repeated this achievement at the 2022 European Beach Volleyball Championships.
