= Diana Lunina =

Ukrainian beach volleyball player

Personal information
- Nationality: Ukrainian
- Born: 28 October 1992 (age 33) Kyiv, Ukraine
- Height: 1.90 m (6 ft 3 in)
- Weight: 71 kg (157 lb)

Sport
- Sport: Beach volleyball
Medal record
Women's beach volleyball
Representing Ukraine
Volleyball World Beach Pro Tour
Gold medal – first place	2022	Mysłowice Future
Gold medal – first place	2023	Spiez Future
Silver medal – second place	2022	Leuven Future
Silver medal – second place	2023	Madrid Future
FIVB Beach Volleyball World Tour
Silver medal – second place	2019	Langkawi Open
Silver medal – second place	2019	Aydin Masters
Bronze medal – third place	2019	Ljubljana Winter Edition
Bronze medal – third place	2019	SMM Pak Bara Beach in Satun

Diana Lunina (born 28 October 1992) is a Ukrainian beach volleyball player.

== Career ==
Since 2013, Svitlana Baburina, Inna Makhno, Myloslava Bezpako, Maryna Samodai, Anastasia Lysenko, Kateryna Kovalenko, Valentina Davidova and Tetiana Lazarenko were her partners.

At the 2019 FIVB Beach Volleyball World Tour she won two silver and two bronze medals.

Diana also won two gold and two silver medals at the Volleyball World Beach Pro Tour in 2022 and 2023.

She competed at the European Beach Volleyball Championships in 2019, 2021 and 2022 without reaching any medals.

She is currently beach volleyball player in the team Balikesir Büyüksehir Belediyespor Kulübü.

== Personal life ==
Lunina's cousin died on March, 9, 2024 fighting as a member of the Armed Forces of Ukraine during the Russian invasion of Ukraine near Avdiivka.
