= Monika Paulikienė =

Lithuanian beach volleyball player (born 1994)

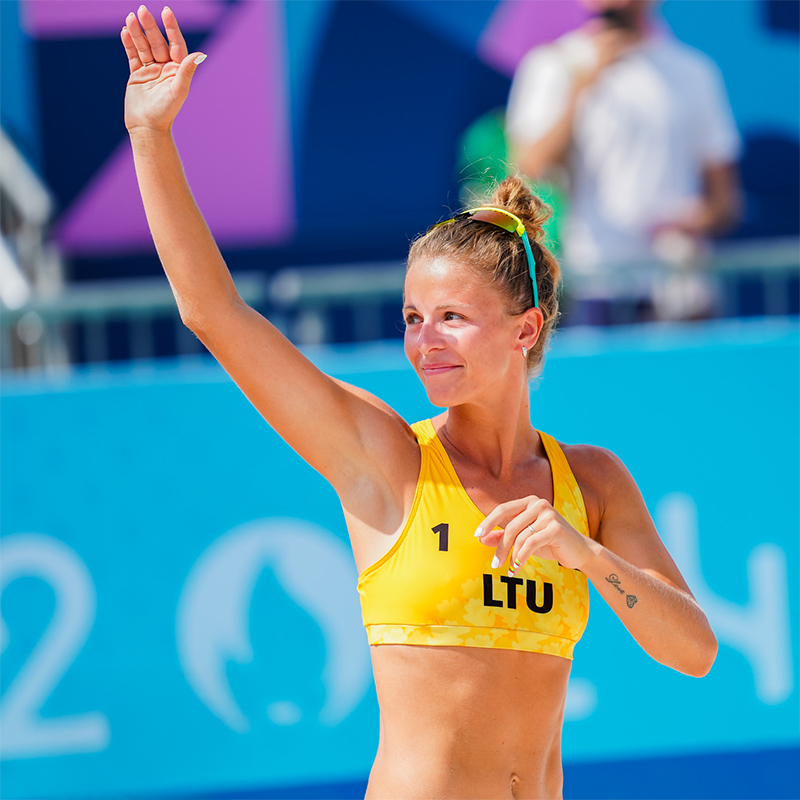

Personal information
- Born: 30 August 1994 (age 32); Tytuvėnai, Lithuania

Beach volleyball information

Current teammate
Teammate
Ainė Raupelytė
Honours
Women's beach volleyball
Representing Lithuania
European Games
Bronze medal – third place	2015 Baku	Team
World Youth Championships
Gold medal – first place	2012 Larnaca	Team
European U20 Championships
Bronze medal – third place	2012 Hartberg	Team
European U18 Championships
Gold medal – first place	2011 Vilnius	Team

Monika Paulikienė (born 30 August 1994) is a Lithuanian beach volleyball player.

2013 became the first Lithuanian beach volleyball players to qualify for the world championships.

2024 together with Aine Raupelyte became first Lithuanian beach volleyball players qualified to Olympic games (Paris 2024).
