= Paula Soria =

Spanish beach volleyball player

Personal information
- Full name: Paula Soria Gutiérrez
- Nationality: Spanish
- Born: 31 January 1993 (age 33); Orihuela, Spain
- Height: 180 cm (5 ft 11 in)

Beach volleyball information

Current teammate
Teammate
Liliana Fernández
Honours
Women's beach volleyball
Representing Spain
Mediterranean Games
Gold medal – first place	2018 Tarragona	Team

Paula Soria Gutiérrez (Note: In this Spanish name, the first or paternal surname is Soria and the second or maternal family name is Gutiérrez.) (born 31 January 1993) is a Spanish beach volleyball player. She played with Liliana Fernández at the 2024 Summer Olympics in Paris.
