= Lena Plesiutschnig =

Austrian beach volleyball player

- Plesiutschnig in 2017

Personal information
- Full name: Lena Maria Plesiutschnig
- Nationality: Austria
- Born: 4 October 1993 (age 33); Graz, Austria
- Hometown: Graz, Austria
- Height: 1.84 m (6 ft 0 in)
- Weight: 68 kg (150 lb)

Beach volleyball information

Current teammate
Years	Teammate
2017–present	Katharina Schützenhöfer

Previous teammates
Years	Teammate
2010–2016; 2013; 2017	Katharina Schützenhöfer; Magdalena Jirak; Cornelia Rimser
Medal record
Women's beach volleyball
Representing Austria
European Games
Silver medal – second place	2015 Baku	Beach
U21 World Championships
Bronze medal – third place	2013 Umag	Beach
U19 World Championships
Silver medal – second place	2011 Umag	Beach
U20 European Championships
Gold medal – first place	2011 Tel Aviv	Beach

Lena Maria Plesiutschnig (born 4 October 1993) is an Austrian professional beach volleyball player who plays as a left-side blocker with her partner Katharina Schützenhöfer. She won the silver medal at the first ever European Games in 2015. Her first and only FIVB World Tour victory so far, came at a 3-star event in Mersin in 2018. She won a silver medal at the 2011 U19 World Championship and a bronze medal at the 2013 U21 World Championship, both competitions were held in Umag. She is also the 2011 U20 European Champion with Schützenhöfer.

== Career podiums ==
=== FIVB World Tour ===
- 3 medals – (1 gold, 1 silver, 1 bronze)

No.	Result	Date	Category	Location	Partner	Opponents	Score		
1.	Bronze	26 Nov 2017	FIVB 2-star	Sydney, Australia	Katharina Schützenhöfer	(Japan) Futami / Hasegawa	16–21	24–22	15–10
2.	Gold	6 May 2018	FIVB 3-star	Mersin, Turkey	Katharina Schützenhöfer	(Netherlands) Keizer / Meppelink	18–21	25–23	15–12
3.	Silver	16 Jun 2018	FIVB 1-Star	Baden, Austria	Katharina Schützenhöfer	(Germany) Mersmann / Tillmann	17–21	16–21	

=== CEV European Tour ===
- 2 medals – (1 silver, 1 bronze)

No.	Result	Date	Category	Location	Partner	Opponents	Score		
1.	Silver	20 Jun 2015	European Games	Baku, Azerbaijan	Katharina Schützenhöfer	(Switzerland) Betschart / Eiholzer	16–21	21–14	13–15
2.	Bronze	11 Jul 2015	CEV Satellite	Vaduz, Liechtenstein	Katharina Schützenhöfer	(France) Jupiter / Longuet	21–15	19–21	15–10
