= Beach volleyball at the 2020 Summer Olympics – Women's tournament =

Women's beach volleyball at the Games of the XXXII Olympiad
- Venue: Shiokaze Park
- Dates: 24 July – 6 August 2021
- Competitors: 48 from 17 nations
- Teams: 24

Medalists
1st place, gold medalist(s)		April Ross; Alix Klineman	United States
2nd place, silver medalist(s)		Taliqua Clancy; Mariafe Artacho del Solar	Australia
3rd place, bronze medalist(s)		Joana Heidrich; Anouk Vergé-Dépré	Switzerland

The women's beach volleyball tournament at the 2020 Olympic Games in Tokyo, Japan, took place at the Shiokaze Park. The competition was held from 24 July to 6 August 2021. It was originally scheduled to take place from 25 July to 8 August 2020, but due to the COVID-19 pandemic, the IOC and the Tokyo 2020 Organising Committee announced on 24 March 2020 that the 2020 Summer Olympics would be delayed to 2021. Because of this pandemic, the games were played behind closed doors. Twenty-four teams with 48 athletes from around the world competed for the gold medal.

April Ross and Alix Klineman won the gold medal, defeating Taliqua Clancy and Mariafe Artacho del Solar in the final, while Joana Heidrich and Anouk Vergé-Dépré won the bronze medal.

The medals for the competition were presented by Mustapha Berraf, IOC Member, Algeria; and the medalists' bouquets were presented by Ary Graça, FIVB President, Brazil.

== Qualification ==
Means of qualification	Date	Venue	Vacancies	Qualified
Host nation	—	—	1	Japan
2019 World Championships	28 June – 7 July 2019	(Germany) Hamburg	1	Canada
2019 FIVB Olympic Qualification Tournament	18–22 September 2019	(China) Haiyang	2	Latvia
2019 FIVB Olympic Qualification Tournament	18–22 September 2019	(China) Haiyang	2	Spain
FIVB Beach Volleyball Olympic Ranking	13 June 2021	(Switzerland) Lausanne	15	United States
FIVB Beach Volleyball Olympic Ranking	13 June 2021	(Switzerland) Lausanne	15	Brazil
FIVB Beach Volleyball Olympic Ranking	13 June 2021	(Switzerland) Lausanne	15	Brazil
FIVB Beach Volleyball Olympic Ranking	13 June 2021	(Switzerland) Lausanne	15	Australia
FIVB Beach Volleyball Olympic Ranking	13 June 2021	(Switzerland) Lausanne	15	United States
FIVB Beach Volleyball Olympic Ranking	13 June 2021	(Switzerland) Lausanne	15	Switzerland
FIVB Beach Volleyball Olympic Ranking	13 June 2021	(Switzerland) Lausanne	15	ROC
FIVB Beach Volleyball Olympic Ranking	13 June 2021	(Switzerland) Lausanne	15	Canada
FIVB Beach Volleyball Olympic Ranking	13 June 2021	(Switzerland) Lausanne	15	Switzerland
FIVB Beach Volleyball Olympic Ranking	13 June 2021	(Switzerland) Lausanne	15	Netherlands
FIVB Beach Volleyball Olympic Ranking	13 June 2021	(Switzerland) Lausanne	15	China
FIVB Beach Volleyball Olympic Ranking	13 June 2021	(Switzerland) Lausanne	15	Czech Republic
FIVB Beach Volleyball Olympic Ranking	13 June 2021	(Switzerland) Lausanne	15	Germany
FIVB Beach Volleyball Olympic Ranking	13 June 2021	(Switzerland) Lausanne	15	Germany
FIVB Beach Volleyball Olympic Ranking	13 June 2021	(Switzerland) Lausanne	15	Italy
2018–2020 CEV Continental Cup Final	23–26 June 2021	(Netherlands) The Hague	1	Netherlands
2018–2020 AVC Continental Cup Final	25–27 June 2021	(Thailand) Nakhon Pathom	1	China
2018–2020 CAVB Continental Cup Final	25–27 June 2021	(Morocco) Agadir	1	Kenya
2018–2020 NORCECA Continental Cup Final	25–27 June 2021	(Mexico) Colima	1	Cuba
2018–2020 CSV Continental Cup Final	26–27 June 2021	(Paraguay) Asunción	1	Argentina
Total			24	

== Teams ==
Twenty four teams were drawn in six pools of four teams.

Team	NOC
Ana Gallay / Fernanda Pereyra	Argentina
Taliqua Clancy / Mariafe Artacho del Solar	Australia
Ágatha Bednarczuk / Eduarda Santos Lisboa	Brazil
Ana Patrícia Ramos / Rebecca Cavalcanti	Brazil
Heather Bansley / Brandie Wilkerson	Canada
Sarah Pavan / Melissa Humana-Paredes	Canada
Wang Fan / Xia Xinyi	China
Xue Chen / Wang Xinxin	China
Lidy Echevarría / Leila Martínez	Cuba
Barbora Hermannová / Markéta Sluková	Czech Republic
Margareta Kozuch / Laura Ludwig	Germany
Julia Sude / Karla Borger	Germany
Marta Menegatti / Viktoria Orsi Toth	Italy
Miki Ishii / Megumi Murakami	Japan
Gaudencia Makokha / Brackcides Khadambi	Kenya
Anastasija Kravčenoka / Tīna Graudiņa	Latvia
Sanne Keizer / Madelein Meppelink	Netherlands
Katja Stam / Raïsa Schoon	Netherlands
Nadezda Makroguzova / Svetlana Kholomina	ROC
Liliana Fernández / Elsa Baquerizo	Spain
Nina Betschart / Tanja Hüberli	Switzerland
Joana Heidrich / Anouk Vergé-Dépré	Switzerland
Kelly Claes / Sarah Sponcil	United States
Alix Klineman / April Ross	United States

== Draw ==
The draw was made on 5 July 2021.

Pool A	Pool B	Pool C
Pavan – Humana-Paredes (CAN)	Klineman – Ross (USA)	Ágatha – Duda (BRA)
Heidrich – Vergé-Dépré (SUI)	Keizer – Meppelink (NED)	Bansley – Wilkerson (CAN)
Sude – Borger (GER)	Liliana – Baquerizo (ESP)	Wang F – Xia (CHN)
Stam – Schoon (NED)	Xue – Wang X (CHN)	Gallay – Pereyra (ARG)

Pool D	Pool E	Pool F
Ana Patrícia – Rebecca (BRA)	Clancy – Artacho del Solar (AUS)	Ishii – Murakami (JPN)
Claes – Sponcil (USA)	Makroguzova – Kholomina (ROC)	Betschart – Hüberli (SUI)
Kravčenoka – Graudiņa (LAT)	Menegatti – Orsi Toth (ITA)	Kozuch – Ludwig (GER)
Makokha – Khadambi (KEN)	Lidy – Leila (CUB)	Hermannová – Sluková (CZE)

== Referees ==
The following referees were selected for the tournament.

- (Argentina) Osvaldo Sumavil
- (Brazil) Mário Ferro
- (China) Wang Lijun
- (Colombia) Juan Carlos Saavedra
- (Greece) Charalampos Papadogoulas
- (Japan) Mariko Satomi
- (Italy) Davide Crescentini
- (Poland) Agnieszka Myszkowska
- (Portugal) Rui Carvalho
- (Russia) Roman Pristovakin
- (South Africa) Giovanni Bake
- (Spain) José María Padrón
- (United States) Brig Beatie

== Preliminary round ==
All times are local (UTC+9).

=== Pool A ===
Pos	Team	Pld	W	L	Pts	SW	SL	SR	SPW	SPL	SPR	Qualification
1	Pavan – Humana-Paredes (CAN)	3	3	0	6	6	0	MAX	129	96	1.344	Round of 16
2	Vergé-Dépré – Heidrich (SUI)	3	2	1	5	4	3	1.333	135	120	1.125	Round of 16
3	Stam – Schoon (NED)	3	1	2	4	2	4	0.500	113	123	0.919	Lucky losers
4	Sude – Borger (GER)	3	0	3	3	1	6	0.167	106	144	0.736	

Source: Tokyo 2020 and FIVB

24 July 2021; 12:00	Pavan – Humana-Paredes (Canada)	2–0	(Netherlands) Stam – Schoon	Shiokaze Park, Tokyo; Referees: Giovanni Bake (RSA), Charalampos Papadogoulas (GRE)
24 July 2021; 12:00	(21–16, 21–14); Report			Shiokaze Park, Tokyo; Referees: Giovanni Bake (RSA), Charalampos Papadogoulas (GRE)

24 July 2021; 17:00	Heidrich – Vergé-Dépré (Switzerland)	2–1	(Germany) Sude – Borger	Shiokaze Park, Tokyo; Referees: Davide Crescentini (ITA), Brig Beatie (USA)
24 July 2021; 17:00	(21–8, 21–23, 15–6); Report			Shiokaze Park, Tokyo; Referees: Davide Crescentini (ITA), Brig Beatie (USA)

26 July 2021; 12:00	Pavan – Humana-Paredes (Canada)	2–0	(Germany) Sude – Borger	Shiokaze Park, Tokyo; Referees: Juan Carlos Saavedra (COL), Rui Carvalho (POR)
26 July 2021; 12:00	(21–17, 21–14); Report			Shiokaze Park, Tokyo; Referees: Juan Carlos Saavedra (COL), Rui Carvalho (POR)

26 July 2021; 21:00	Heidrich – Vergé-Dépré (Switzerland)	2–0	(Netherlands) Stam – Schoon	Shiokaze Park, Tokyo; Referees: Brig Beatie (USA), Agnieszka Myszkowska (POL)
26 July 2021; 21:00	(22–20, 21–18); Report			Shiokaze Park, Tokyo; Referees: Brig Beatie (USA), Agnieszka Myszkowska (POL)

29 July 2021; 10:00	Pavan – Humana-Paredes (Canada)	2–0	(Switzerland) Heidrich – Vergé-Dépré	Shiokaze Park, Tokyo; Referees: Roman Pristovakin (RUS), Wang Lijun (CHN)
29 July 2021; 10:00	(21–13, 24–22); Report			Shiokaze Park, Tokyo; Referees: Roman Pristovakin (RUS), Wang Lijun (CHN)

29 July 2021; 15:00	Sude – Borger (Germany)	0–2	(Netherlands) Stam – Schoon	Shiokaze Park, Tokyo; Referees: Agnieszka Myszkowska (POL), Charalampos Papadogoulas (GRE)
29 July 2021; 15:00	(22–24, 16–21); Report			Shiokaze Park, Tokyo; Referees: Agnieszka Myszkowska (POL), Charalampos Papadogoulas (GRE)

=== Pool B ===
Pos	Team	Pld	W	L	Pts	SW	SL	SR	SPW	SPL	SPR	Qualification
1	Ross – Klineman (USA)	3	3	0	6	6	1	6.000	140	109	1.284	Round of 16
2	Xue – Wang X (CHN)	3	2	1	5	4	3	1.333	143	128	1.117	Round of 16
3	Liliana – Baquerizo (ESP)	3	1	2	4	2	5	0.400	108	137	0.788	Lucky losers
4	Keizer – Meppelink (NED)	3	0	3	3	3	6	0.500	160	177	0.904	

Source: Tokyo 2020 and FIVB

25 July 2021; 09:00	Klineman – Ross (United States)	2–0	(China) Xue – Wang X	Shiokaze Park, Tokyo; Referees: Mariko Satomi (JPN), Davide Crescentini (ITA)
25 July 2021; 09:00	(21–17, 21–19); Report			Shiokaze Park, Tokyo; Referees: Mariko Satomi (JPN), Davide Crescentini (ITA)

25 July 2021; 21:00	Keizer – Meppelink (Netherlands)	1–2	(Spain) Liliana – Baquerizo	Shiokaze Park, Tokyo; Referees: Davide Crescentini (ITA), Osvaldo Sumavil (ARG)
25 July 2021; 21:00	(21–19, 18–21, 14–16); Report			Shiokaze Park, Tokyo; Referees: Davide Crescentini (ITA), Osvaldo Sumavil (ARG)

27 July 2021; 09:00	Klineman – Ross (United States)	2–0	(Spain) Liliana – Baquerizo	Shiokaze Park, Tokyo; Referees: Mário Ferro (BRA), Davide Crescentini (ITA)
27 July 2021; 09:00	(21–13, 21–16); Report			Shiokaze Park, Tokyo; Referees: Mário Ferro (BRA), Davide Crescentini (ITA)

27 July 2021; 16:00	Keizer – Meppelink (Netherlands)	1–2	(China) Xue – Wang X	Shiokaze Park, Tokyo; Referees: Rui Carvalho (POR), Agnieszka Myszkowska (POL)
27 July 2021; 16:00	(21–19, 29–31, 13–15); Report			Shiokaze Park, Tokyo; Referees: Rui Carvalho (POR), Agnieszka Myszkowska (POL)

30 July 2021; 09:00	Klineman – Ross (United States)	2–1	(Netherlands) Keizer – Meppelink	Shiokaze Park, Tokyo; Referees: Agnieszka Myszkowska (POL), Juan Carlos Saavedra (COL)
30 July 2021; 09:00	(20–22, 21–17, 15–5); Report			Shiokaze Park, Tokyo; Referees: Agnieszka Myszkowska (POL), Juan Carlos Saavedra (COL)

30 July 2021; 17:00	Liliana – Baquerizo (Spain)	0–2	(China) Xue – Wang X	Shiokaze Park, Tokyo; Referees: Davide Crescentini (ITA), Osvaldo Sumavil (ARG)
30 July 2021; 17:00	(13–21, 10–21); Report			Shiokaze Park, Tokyo; Referees: Davide Crescentini (ITA), Osvaldo Sumavil (ARG)

=== Pool C ===
Pos	Team	Pld	W	L	Pts	SW	SL	SR	SPW	SPL	SPR	Qualification
1	Wang F – Xia (CHN)	3	3	0	6	6	1	6.000	138	106	1.302	Round of 16
2	Ágatha – Duda (BRA)	3	2	1	5	4	2	2.000	116	108	1.074	Round of 16
3	Bansley – Wilkerson (CAN)	3	1	2	4	3	4	0.750	126	128	0.984	Round of 16
4	Gallay – Pereyra (ARG)	3	0	3	3	0	6	0.000	89	127	0.701	

Updated to match(es) played on 29 July 2021. Source: Tokyo 2020 and FIVB

24 July 2021; 11:00	Ágatha – Duda (Brazil)	2–0	(Argentina) Gallay – Pereyra	Shiokaze Park, Tokyo; Referees: José María Padrón (ESP), Agnieszka Myszkowska (POL)
24 July 2021; 11:00	(21–19, 21–11); Report			Shiokaze Park, Tokyo; Referees: José María Padrón (ESP), Agnieszka Myszkowska (POL)

24 July 2021; 20:00	Bansley – Wilkerson (Canada)	1–2	(China) Wang F – Xia	Shiokaze Park, Tokyo; Referees: Juan Carlos Saavedra (COL), José María Padrón (ESP)
24 July 2021; 20:00	(21–18, 15–21, 11–15); Report			Shiokaze Park, Tokyo; Referees: Juan Carlos Saavedra (COL), José María Padrón (ESP)

27 July 2021; 11:00	Bansley – Wilkerson (Canada)	2–0	(Argentina) Gallay – Pereyra	Shiokaze Park, Tokyo; Referees: Mariko Satomi (JPN), Mário Ferro (BRA)
27 July 2021; 11:00	(22–20, 21–12); Report			Shiokaze Park, Tokyo; Referees: Mariko Satomi (JPN), Mário Ferro (BRA)

27 July 2021; 22:00	Ágatha – Duda (Brazil)	0–2	(China) Wang F – Xia	Shiokaze Park, Tokyo; Referees: Davide Crescentini (ITA), Osvaldo Sumavil (ARG)
27 July 2021; 22:00	(18–21, 14–21); Report			Shiokaze Park, Tokyo; Referees: Davide Crescentini (ITA), Osvaldo Sumavil (ARG)

29 July 2021; 20:00	Wang F – Xia (China)	2–0	(Argentina) Gallay – Pereyra	Shiokaze Park, Tokyo; Referees: Giovanni Bake (RSA), Roman Pristovakin (RUS)
29 July 2021; 20:00	(21–14, 21–13); Report			Shiokaze Park, Tokyo; Referees: Giovanni Bake (RSA), Roman Pristovakin (RUS)

29 July 2021; 21:00	Ágatha – Duda (Brazil)	2–0	(Canada) Bansley – Wilkerson	Shiokaze Park, Tokyo; Referees: Osvaldo Sumavil (ARG), Davide Crescentini (ITA)
29 July 2021; 21:00	(21–18, 21–18); Report			Shiokaze Park, Tokyo; Referees: Osvaldo Sumavil (ARG), Davide Crescentini (ITA)

=== Pool D ===
Pos	Team	Pld	W	L	Pts	SW	SL	SR	SPW	SPL	SPR	Qualification
1	Claes – Sponcil (USA)	3	3	0	6	6	2	3.000	147	110	1.336	Round of 16
2	Graudiņa – Kravčenoka (LAT)	3	2	1	5	5	3	1.667	135	120	1.125	Round of 16
3	Ana Patrícia – Rebecca (BRA)	3	1	2	4	4	4	1.000	141	125	1.128	Round of 16
4	Makokha – Khadambi (KEN)	3	0	3	3	0	6	0.000	58	126	0.460	

Source: Tokyo 2020 and FIVB

26 July 2021; 09:00	Claes – Sponcil (United States)	2–1	(Latvia) Kravčenoka – Graudiņa	Shiokaze Park, Tokyo; Referees: Charalampos Papadogoulas (GRE), Giovanni Bake (RSA)
26 July 2021; 09:00	(21–13, 16–21, 15–11); Report			Shiokaze Park, Tokyo; Referees: Charalampos Papadogoulas (GRE), Giovanni Bake (RSA)

26 July 2021; 11:00	Ana Patrícia – Rebecca (Brazil)	2–0	(Kenya) Makokha – Khadambi	Shiokaze Park, Tokyo; Referees: Agnieszka Myszkowska (POL), Charalampos Papadogoulas (GRE)
26 July 2021; 11:00	(21–15, 21–9); Report			Shiokaze Park, Tokyo; Referees: Agnieszka Myszkowska (POL), Charalampos Papadogoulas (GRE)

28 July 2021; 11:00	Ana Patrícia – Rebecca (Brazil)	1–2	(Latvia) Kravčenoka – Graudiņa	Shiokaze Park, Tokyo; Referees: Juan Carlos Saavedra (COL), Charalampos Papadogoulas (GRE)
28 July 2021; 11:00	(15–21, 21–12, 12–15); Report			Shiokaze Park, Tokyo; Referees: Juan Carlos Saavedra (COL), Charalampos Papadogoulas (GRE)

29 July 2021; 09:00	Claes – Sponcil (United States)	2–0	(Kenya) Makokha – Khadambi	Shiokaze Park, Tokyo; Referees: Mariko Satomi (JPN), Giovanni Bake (RSA)
29 July 2021; 09:00	(21–8, 21–6); Report			Shiokaze Park, Tokyo; Referees: Mariko Satomi (JPN), Giovanni Bake (RSA)

31 July 2021; 09:00	Ana Patrícia – Rebecca (Brazil)	1–2	(United States) Claes – Sponcil	Shiokaze Park, Tokyo; Referees: Wang Lijun (CHN), Roman Pristovakin (RUS)
31 July 2021; 09:00	(21–17, 19–21, 11–15); Report			Shiokaze Park, Tokyo; Referees: Wang Lijun (CHN), Roman Pristovakin (RUS)

31 July 2021; 10:00	Kravčenoka – Graudiņa (Latvia)	2–0	(Kenya) Makokha – Khadambi	Shiokaze Park, Tokyo; Referees: Osvaldo Sumavil (ARG), Mário Ferro (BRA)
31 July 2021; 10:00	(21–6, 21–14); Report			Shiokaze Park, Tokyo; Referees: Osvaldo Sumavil (ARG), Mário Ferro (BRA)

=== Pool E ===
Pos	Team	Pld	W	L	Pts	SW	SL	SR	SPW	SPL	SPR	Qualification
1	Makroguzova – Kholomina (ROC)	3	3	0	6	6	1	6.000	135	101	1.337	Round of 16
2	Artacho del Solar – Clancy (AUS)	3	2	1	5	5	2	2.500	126	119	1.059	Round of 16
3	Lidy – Leila (CUB)	3	1	2	4	2	4	0.500	98	116	0.845	Lucky losers
4	Menegatti – Orsi Toth (ITA)	3	0	3	3	0	6	0.000	104	127	0.819	

Source: Tokyo 2020 and FIVB

25 July 2021; 12:00	Clancy – Artacho del Solar (Australia)	2–0	(Cuba) Lidy – Leila	Shiokaze Park, Tokyo; Referees: Mário Ferro (BRA), Wang Lijun (CHN)
25 July 2021; 12:00	(21–15, 21–14); Report			Shiokaze Park, Tokyo; Referees: Mário Ferro (BRA), Wang Lijun (CHN)

25 July 2021; 15:00	Makroguzova – Kholomina	2–0	(Italy) Menegatti – Orsi Toth	Shiokaze Park, Tokyo; Referees: Charalampos Papadogoulas (GRE), Agnieszka Myszkowska (POL)
25 July 2021; 15:00	(21–18, 21–15); Report			Shiokaze Park, Tokyo; Referees: Charalampos Papadogoulas (GRE), Agnieszka Myszkowska (POL)

28 July 2021; 16:00	Makroguzova – Kholomina	2–0	(Cuba) Lidy – Leila	Shiokaze Park, Tokyo; Referees: Davide Crescentini (ITA), Osvaldo Sumavil (ARG)
28 July 2021; 16:00	(21–16, 21–11); Report			Shiokaze Park, Tokyo; Referees: Davide Crescentini (ITA), Osvaldo Sumavil (ARG)

28 July 2021; 21:00	Clancy – Artacho del Solar (Australia)	2–0	(Italy) Menegatti – Orsi Toth	Shiokaze Park, Tokyo; Referees: Agnieszka Myszkowska (POL), Charalampos Papadogoulas (GRE)
28 July 2021; 21:00	(22–20, 21–19); Report			Shiokaze Park, Tokyo; Referees: Agnieszka Myszkowska (POL), Charalampos Papadogoulas (GRE)

30 July 2021; 15:00	Clancy – Artacho del Solar (Australia)	1–2	Makroguzova – Kholomina	Shiokaze Park, Tokyo; Referees: Osvaldo Sumavil (ARG), Giovanni Bake (RSA)
30 July 2021; 15:00	(8–21, 21–15, 12–15); Report			Shiokaze Park, Tokyo; Referees: Osvaldo Sumavil (ARG), Giovanni Bake (RSA)

30 July 2021; 20:00	Menegatti – Orsi Toth (Italy)	0–2	(Cuba) Lidy – Leila	Shiokaze Park, Tokyo; Referees: José María Padrón (ESP), Agnieszka Myszkowska (POL)
30 July 2021; 20:00	(16–21, 16–21); Report			Shiokaze Park, Tokyo; Referees: José María Padrón (ESP), Agnieszka Myszkowska (POL)

=== Pool F ===
Pos	Team	Pld	W	L	Pts	SW	SL	SR	SPW	SPL	SPR	Qualification
1	Hüberli – Betschart (SUI)	3	3	0	6	6	2	3.000	111	111	1.000	Round of 16
2	Ludwig – Kozuch (GER)	3	2	1	5	5	2	2.500	102	98	1.041	Round of 16
3	Ishii – Murakami (JPN)	3	1	2	4	3	4	0.750	89	93	0.957	Lucky losers
4	Hermannová – Sluková (CZE) (Note: Team Hermannova – Slukova (CZE) was unable to play the match due to COVID-19 regulations. In accordance with the rules for beach volleyball, the other teams were given two points and they were awarded a defeat and 1 point.)	3	0	3	3	0	6	0.000	0	126	0.000	Did not start

Source: Tokyo 2020 and FIVB
Notes:

24 July 2021; 09:00	Ishii – Murakami (Japan)	2–0; Awarded (Note: Team Hermannova – Slukova (CZE) was unable to play the match due to Covid-19 regulations. In accordance with the rules for Beach Volleyball, the other team were given two points and they were awarded a defeat and 1 point.)	(Czech Republic) Hermannová – Sluková	Shiokaze Park, Tokyo; Referees: Agnieszka Myszkowska (POL), Juan Carlos Saavedra (COL)
24 July 2021; 09:00	Report			Shiokaze Park, Tokyo; Referees: Agnieszka Myszkowska (POL), Juan Carlos Saavedra (COL)

24 July 2021; 15:00	Betschart – Hüberli (Switzerland)	2–1	(Germany) Kozuch – Ludwig	Shiokaze Park, Tokyo; Referees: Brig Beatie (USA), Mariko Satomi (JPN)
24 July 2021; 15:00	(23–25, 22–20, 16–14); Report			Shiokaze Park, Tokyo; Referees: Brig Beatie (USA), Mariko Satomi (JPN)

26 July 2021; 16:00	Betschart – Hüberli (Switzerland)	2–0; Awarded	(Czech Republic) Hermannová – Sluková	Shiokaze Park, Tokyo
26 July 2021; 16:00	Report			Shiokaze Park, Tokyo

26 July 2021; 20:00	Ishii – Murakami (Japan)	0–2	(Germany) Kozuch – Ludwig	Shiokaze Park, Tokyo; Referees: Giovanni Bake (RSA), Juan Carlos Saavedra (COL)
26 July 2021; 20:00	(17–21, 20–22); Report			Shiokaze Park, Tokyo; Referees: Giovanni Bake (RSA), Juan Carlos Saavedra (COL)

28 July 2021; 10:00	Ishii – Murakami (Japan)	1–2	(Switzerland) Betschart – Hüberli	Shiokaze Park, Tokyo; Referees: Rui Carvalho (POR), Brig Beatie (USA)
28 July 2021; 10:00	(21–14, 19–21, 12–15); Report			Shiokaze Park, Tokyo; Referees: Rui Carvalho (POR), Brig Beatie (USA)

28 July 2021; 15:00	Kozuch – Ludwig (Germany)	2–0; Awarded	(Czech Republic) Hermannová – Sluková	Shiokaze Park, Tokyo
28 July 2021; 15:00	Report			Shiokaze Park, Tokyo

=== Lucky losers ===
The table below shows the ranking of third-placed teams in the preliminary round. The top two teams advanced to next round automatically. The other teams competed for the two remaining spots. The third-ranked team played against the sixth-ranked team, and the fourth-ranked team played against the fifth-ranked team.

Pos	Team	Pld	W	L	Pts	SW	SL	SR	SPW	SPL	SPR	Qualification
1	Ana Patrícia – Rebecca (BRA)	3	1	2	4	4	4	1.000	141	125	1.128	Round of 16
2	Bansley – Wilkerson (CAN)	3	1	2	4	3	4	0.750	126	128	0.984	Round of 16
3	Ishii – Murakami (JPN)	3	1	2	4	3	4	0.750	89	93	0.957	Lucky loser playoffs
4	Stam – Schoon (NED)	3	1	2	4	2	4	0.500	113	123	0.919	Lucky loser playoffs
5	Lidy – Leila (CUB)	3	1	2	4	2	4	0.500	98	116	0.845	Lucky loser playoffs
6	Liliana – Baquerizo (ESP)	3	1	2	4	2	5	0.400	108	137	0.788	Lucky loser playoffs

Source: Tokyo 2020 and FIVB

==== Lucky loser playoffs ====
31 July 2021; 17:00	Ishii – Murakami (Japan)	0–2	(Spain) Liliana – Baquerizo	Shiokaze Park, Tokyo; Referees: Charalampos Papadogoulas (GRE), Brig Beatie (USA)
31 July 2021; 17:00	(15–21, 10–21); Report			Shiokaze Park, Tokyo; Referees: Charalampos Papadogoulas (GRE), Brig Beatie (USA)

31 July 2021; 20:00	Stam – Schoon (Netherlands)	0–2	(Cuba) Lidy – Leila	Shiokaze Park, Tokyo; Referees: Roman Pristovakin (RUS), Giovanni Bake (RSA)
31 July 2021; 20:00	(17–21, 17–21); Report			Shiokaze Park, Tokyo; Referees: Roman Pristovakin (RUS), Giovanni Bake (RSA)

== Knockout stage ==
The round of sixteen pair ups were determined by a draw following the group stage.

=== Bracket ===
Round of 16
2 August
Pavan – Humana-Paredes (CAN)	2
Liliana – Baquerizo (ESP)	0
1 August
Clancy – Artacho del Solar (AUS)	2
Xue – Wang X (CHN)	0
1 August
Makroguzova – Kholomina (ROC)	1
Kravčenoka – Graudiņa (LAT)	2
1 August
Bansley – Wilkerson (CAN)	2
Claes – Sponcil (USA)	1
1 August
Wang F – Xia (CHN)	0
Ana Patrícia – Rebecca (BRA)	2
1 August
Heidrich – Vergé-Dépré (SUI)	2
Hüberli – Betschart (SUI)	1
1 August
Kozuch – Ludwig (GER)	2
Ágatha – Duda (BRA)	1
2 August
Lidy – Leila (CUB)	0
Ross – Klineman (USA)	2

Quarter-finals
3 August
Pavan – Humana-Paredes (CAN)	1
Clancy – Artacho del Solar (AUS)	2
3 August
Kravčenoka – Graudiņa (LAT)	2
Bansley – Wilkerson (CAN)	1
3 August
Ana Patrícia – Rebecca (BRA)	1
Heidrich – Vergé-Dépré (SUI)	2
3 August
Kozuch – Ludwig (GER)	0
Ross – Klineman (USA)	2

Semi-finals
5 August
Clancy – Artacho del Solar (AUS)	2
Kravčenoka – Graudiņa (LAT)	0
5 August
Heidrich – Vergé-Dépré (SUI)	0
Ross – Klineman (USA)	2

Gold medal
6 August
Clancy – Artacho del Solar (AUS)	0
Ross – Klineman (USA)	2
Bronze medal
6 August
Kravčenoka – Graudiņa (LAT)	0
Heidrich – Vergé-Dépré (SUI)	2

=== Round of 16 ===
1 August 2021; 09:00	Bansley – Wilkerson (Canada)	2–1	(United States) Claes – Sponcil	Shiokaze Park, Tokyo; Referees: Agnieszka Myszkowska (POL), Rui Carvalho (POR)
1 August 2021; 09:00	(22–24, 21–18, 15–13); Report			Shiokaze Park, Tokyo; Referees: Agnieszka Myszkowska (POL), Rui Carvalho (POR)

1 August 2021; 10:00	Wang F – Xia (China)	0–2	(Brazil) Ana Patrícia – Rebecca	Shiokaze Park, Tokyo; Referees: José María Padrón (ESP), Juan Carlos Saavedra (COL)
1 August 2021; 10:00	(14–21, 21–23); Report			Shiokaze Park, Tokyo; Referees: José María Padrón (ESP), Juan Carlos Saavedra (COL)

1 August 2021; 14:00	Makroguzova – Kholomina	1–2	(Latvia) Kravčenoka – Graudiņa	Shiokaze Park, Tokyo; Referees: Wang Lijun (CHN), Davide Crescentini (ITA)
1 August 2021; 14:00	(21–16, 17–21, 13–15); Report			Shiokaze Park, Tokyo; Referees: Wang Lijun (CHN), Davide Crescentini (ITA)

1 August 2021; 17:00	Kozuch – Ludwig (Germany)	2–1	(Brazil) Ágatha – Duda	Shiokaze Park, Tokyo; Referees: Charalampos Papadogoulas (GRE), Agnieszka Myszkowska (POL)
1 August 2021; 17:00	(21–19, 19–21, 16–14); Report			Shiokaze Park, Tokyo; Referees: Charalampos Papadogoulas (GRE), Agnieszka Myszkowska (POL)

1 August 2021; 18:00	Heidrich – Vergé-Dépré (Switzerland)	2–1	(Switzerland) Betschart – Hüberli	Shiokaze Park, Tokyo; Referees: Mariko Satomi (JPN), Brig Beatie (USA)
1 August 2021; 18:00	(21–12, 19–21, 23–21); Report			Shiokaze Park, Tokyo; Referees: Mariko Satomi (JPN), Brig Beatie (USA)

1 August 2021; 21:00	Clancy – Artacho del Solar (Australia)	2–0	(China) Xue – Wang X	Shiokaze Park, Tokyo; Referees: Roman Pristovakin (RUS), Giovanni Bake (RSA)
1 August 2021; 21:00	(22–20, 21–13); Report			Shiokaze Park, Tokyo; Referees: Roman Pristovakin (RUS), Giovanni Bake (RSA)

2 August 2021; 09:00	Lidy – Leila (Cuba)	0–2	(United States) Klineman – Ross	Shiokaze Park, Tokyo; Referees: Rui Carvalho (POR), Mariko Satomi (JPN)
2 August 2021; 09:00	(17–21, 15–21); Report			Shiokaze Park, Tokyo; Referees: Rui Carvalho (POR), Mariko Satomi (JPN)

2 August 2021; 10:00	Pavan – Humana-Paredes (Canada)	2–0	(Spain) Liliana – Baquerizo	Shiokaze Park, Tokyo; Referees: Lijun Colombia Juan (COL), Agnieszka Myszkowska (POL)
2 August 2021; 10:00	(21–13, 21–13); Report			Shiokaze Park, Tokyo; Referees: Lijun Colombia Juan (COL), Agnieszka Myszkowska (POL)

=== Quarterfinals ===
3 August 2021; 09:00	Kozuch – Ludwig (Germany)	0–2	(United States) Klineman – Ross	Shiokaze Park, Tokyo; Referees: Juan Carlos Saavedra (COL), Charalampos Papadogoulas (GRE)
3 August 2021; 09:00	(19–21, 19–21); Report			Shiokaze Park, Tokyo; Referees: Juan Carlos Saavedra (COL), Charalampos Papadogoulas (GRE)

3 August 2021; 10:00	Ana Patrícia – Rebecca (Brazil)	1–2	(Switzerland) Heidrich – Vergé-Dépré	Shiokaze Park, Tokyo; Referees: Agnieszka Myszkowska (POL), Brig Beatie (USA)
3 August 2021; 10:00	(19–21, 21–18, 12–15); Report			Shiokaze Park, Tokyo; Referees: Agnieszka Myszkowska (POL), Brig Beatie (USA)

3 August 2021; 21:00	Kravčenoka – Graudiņa (Latvia)	2–1	(Canada) Bansley – Wilkerson	Shiokaze Park, Tokyo; Referees: Davide Crescentini (ITA), Osvaldo Sumavil (ARG)
3 August 2021; 21:00	(21–13, 18–21, 15–11); Report			Shiokaze Park, Tokyo; Referees: Davide Crescentini (ITA), Osvaldo Sumavil (ARG)

3 August 2021; 22:00	Pavan – Humana-Paredes (Canada)	1–2	(Australia) Clancy – Artacho del Solar	Shiokaze Park, Tokyo; Referees: José María Padrón (ESP), Wang Lijun (CHN)
3 August 2021; 22:00	(15–21, 21–19, 12–15); Report			Shiokaze Park, Tokyo; Referees: José María Padrón (ESP), Wang Lijun (CHN)

=== Semifinals ===
5 August 2021; 09:00	Heidrich – Vergé-Dépré (Switzerland)	0–2	(United States) Klineman – Ross	Shiokaze Park, Tokyo; Referees: Roman Pristovakin (RUS), Mariko Satomi (JPN)
5 August 2021; 09:00	(12–21, 11–21); Report			Shiokaze Park, Tokyo; Referees: Roman Pristovakin (RUS), Mariko Satomi (JPN)

5 August 2021; 10:00	Clancy – Artacho del Solar (Australia)	2–0	(Latvia) Kravčenoka – Graudiņa	Shiokaze Park, Tokyo; Referees: Juan Carlos Saavedra (COL), Giovanni Bake (RSA)
5 August 2021; 10:00	(23–21, 21–13); Report			Shiokaze Park, Tokyo; Referees: Juan Carlos Saavedra (COL), Giovanni Bake (RSA)

=== Bronze medal game ===
6 August 2021; 10:00	Kravčenoka – Graudiņa (Latvia)	0–2	(Switzerland) Heidrich – Vergé-Dépré	Shiokaze Park, Tokyo; Referees: Rui Carvalho (POR), Mariko Satomi (JPN)
6 August 2021; 10:00	(19–21, 15–21); Report			Shiokaze Park, Tokyo; Referees: Rui Carvalho (POR), Mariko Satomi (JPN)

=== Gold medal game ===
6 August 2021; 11:30	Clancy – Artacho del Solar (Australia)	0–2	(United States) Klineman – Ross	Shiokaze Park, Tokyo; Referees: Mário Ferro (BRA), Charalampos Papadogoulas (GRE)
6 August 2021; 11:30	(15–21, 16–21); Report			Shiokaze Park, Tokyo; Referees: Mário Ferro (BRA), Charalampos Papadogoulas (GRE)

== Final ranking ==
Rank	Team
Gold medal	Ross – Klineman (USA)
Silver medal	Clancy – Artacho del Solar (AUS)
Bronze medal	Heidrich – Vergé-Dépré (SUI)
4	Kravčenoka – Graudiņa (LAT)
5	Ana Patrícia – Rebecca (BRA)
5	Bansley – Wilkerson (CAN)
5	Pavan – Humana-Paredes (CAN)
5	Kozuch – Ludwig (GER)
9	Ágatha – Duda (BRA)
9	Wang F – Xia (CHN)
9	Xue – Wang X (CHN)
9	Lidy – Leila (CUB)
9	Makroguzova – Kholomina (ROC)
9	Hüberli – Betschart (SUI)
9	Liliana – Baquerizo (ESP)
9	Claes – Sponcil (USA)
17	Ishii – Murakami (JPN)
17	Stam – Schoon (NED)
19	Gallay – Pereyra (ARG)
19	Hermannová – Sluková (CZE)
19	Sude – Borger (GER)
19	Menegatti – Orsi Toth (ITA)
19	Makokha – Khadambi (KEN)
19	Keizer – Meppelink (NED)

== See also ==
- Beach volleyball at the 2020 Summer Olympics – Men's tournament
