= Viktoria Orsi Toth =

Italian beach volleyball player

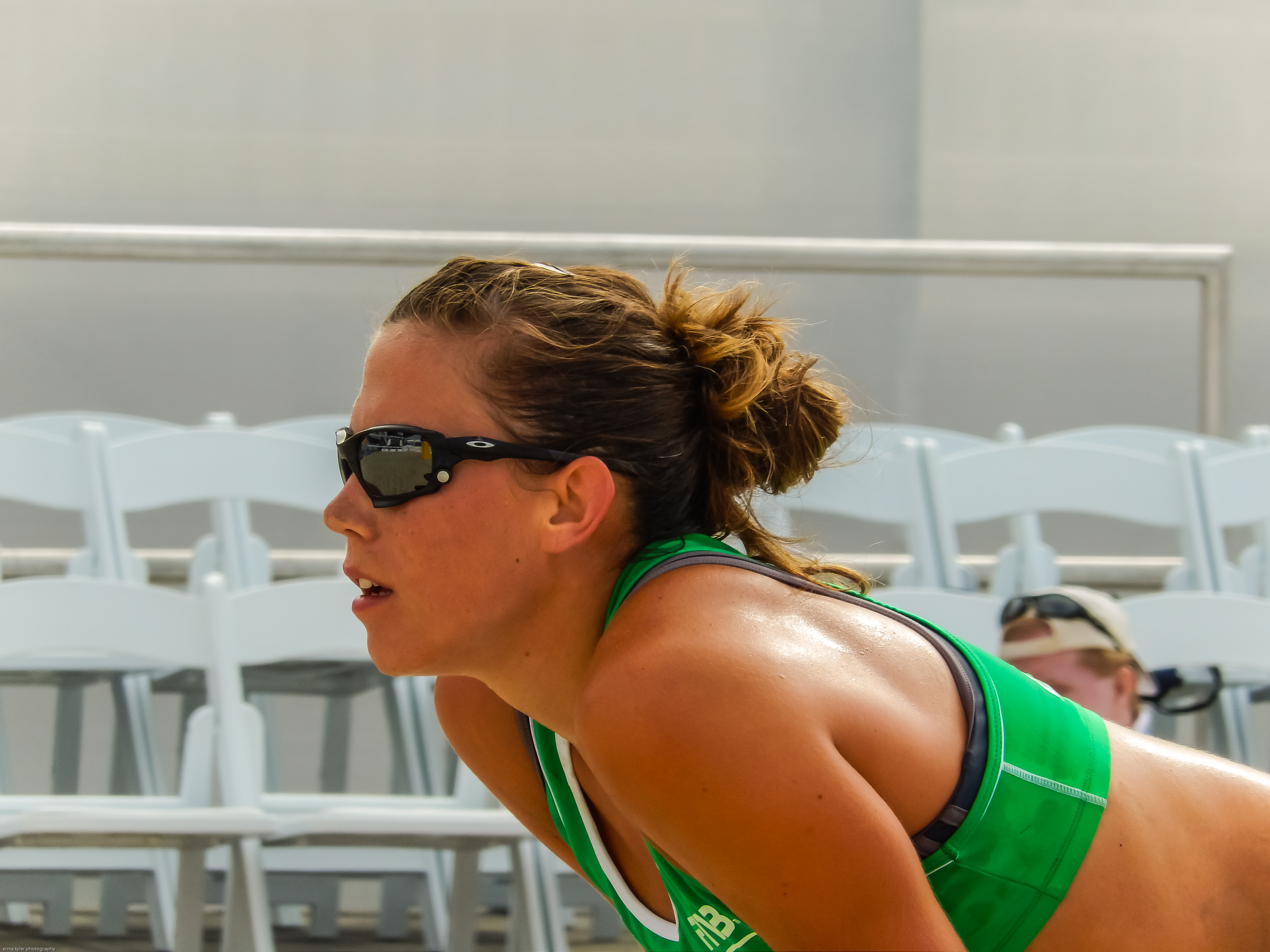
- Orsi Toth in 2013

Personal information
- National team: Italy
- Born: 14 August 1990 (age 36) Budapest, Hungary
- Years active: 2010–present
- Height: 1.86 m (6 ft 1 in)

Sport
- Sport: Beach volleyball
- Position: Right side/blocker
- Partner: Marta Menegatti (2013–16, 2018–)
- Former partner: Laura Giombini (2011–12)
- Coached by: Lissandro Carvalho (2010–13, 2015–16); Paulo Moreira Da Costa (2014); Terenzio Feroleto (2018–)
International medals
Women's beach volleyball
Representing Italy
World Tour
| Gold medal – first place | 2015 Sochi | Open |
| Gold medal – first place | 2018 Agadir | 2-star |
| Silver medal – second place | 2014 Klagenfurt | Grand Slam |
| Silver medal – second place | 2015 Antalya | Open |
| Silver medal – second place | 2018 Qinzhou | 3-star |
| Bronze medal – third place | 2015 Moscow | Grand Slam |
| Bronze medal – third place | 2015 Puerto Vallarta | Open |
U21 World Championships
| Silver medal – second place | 2010 Alanya | Team |
Women's volleyball
Representing Italy
Junior European Championship
| Gold medal – first place | 2008 Italy | Team |
Youth European Championship
| Bronze medal – third place | 2007 Czech Republic | Team |
- Updated on 3 February 2019

Viktoria Orsi Toth (born 14 August 1990) is an Italian beach volleyball player who plays as a right-side blocker. With partner Marta Menegatti, she achieved a career-high world ranking of No. 7 in June 2016. Her career highlights include two gold, three silver and two bronze medals on the FIVB World Tour.

Born in Hungary, her family moved to Italy when Orsi Toth was five. She began her sporting career playing indoor volleyball for various clubs, including two seasons in the Serie A1. As a member of the Italy women's national under-20 team, she won the 2008 Junior European Volleyball Championship. Orsi Toth competed in her first international beach volleyball event in 2010 and quit indoor volleyball the following year to focus solely on the beach game.

Orsi Toth debuted on the World Tour in 2011. For the next two and a half seasons, she was mostly partnered with Laura Giombini and struggled to qualify for main draws. Her breakthrough came mid-2013 when she teamed up with Menegatti. The pair medalled on the World Tour five times over the next three years, including their first World Tour title in 2015. They qualified for the 2016 Summer Olympics but Orsi Toth was suspended right before the tournament for a doping violation, for which she has maintained her innocence. After serving a two-year ban, she returned to international competition in July 2018, resuming her partnership with Menegatti.

== Early and personal life ==
Orsi Toth was born on 14 August 1990 in Budapest, Hungary. Her parents were both athletes; her father, Laszlo, was a decathlete who represented Hungary in international events, while her mother, Agnese, played basketball for the Hungary national team and in Italy's Serie A. They both later became physical education teachers. Orsi Toth has two siblings: her brother, Lorenzo, was a track and field athlete who ran the 800 metres; her younger sister, Reka, was a silver medalist at the 2017 European U20 Beach Volleyball Championships, and has played NCAA Division I indoor volleyball for the Coastal Carolina Chanticleers (2018) and beach volleyball for the Loyola Marymount Lions (since 2019).

Orsi Toth was five when her parents moved the family to Italy for their careers, eventually settling down in Santeramo in Colle. Growing up, Orsi Toth played various sports including swimming, ballet and taekwondo. She had originally aspired to take after her father and become a heptathlete. However, she detested running and lacked access to track and field training facilities. She took up indoor volleyball instead as many of her friends were already playing it, even though her parents were initially against their daughter playing volleyball as Hungary does not have a strong tradition in the sport. Up until the 2005–06 season, she played in the youth ranks of a local sports club, Santeramo Sport, alongside Immacolata Sirressi. Orsi Toth credits Sirressi with making her become attracted to indoor volleyball, and the two later became teammates on the Italy women's national under-18 and under-20 teams, as well as in the Serie A1 club Tena Volley Santeramo.

Orsi Toth is a naturalized Italian citizen. Although she grew up in Italy, she still converses in Hungarian with her parents. She has been a member of the Centro Sportivo Aeronautica Militare since September 2015 with the current rank of Airman First Class (Italian: Primo Aviere). Off the court, Orsi Toth has described herself as shy.

== Indoor career ==
=== Club ===
Orsi Toth began her sporting career playing indoor volleyball in the outside/opposite hitter position. She advanced from the youth leagues when she was selected to the Italian Volleyball Federation's (FIPAV) Club Italia in the 2006–07 season. The club played in the Serie B1 at the time, the third division of the Italian volleyball league system.

In the summer of 2007, she signed with Lines Ecocapitanata Altamura in the Serie A1, the top division of the league system. As the second-youngest player in the league, Orsi Toth made her debut in October as a substitute in the third set of her club's three-set loss against Unicom Starker Kerakoll Sassuolo. Altamura finished 9th out of the 12 Serie A1 clubs in the 2007–08 regular season, just missing out on advancing to the eight-team championship playoffs. They also took part in the Italian Cup, a volleyball competition involving the Serie A1 and A2 clubs, (Note: In the 2007–08 season, a combined Italian Cup was held for the Serie A1 and A2 clubs. In the 2008–09 season, a separate Serie A1 Italian Cup was held for the Serie A1 clubs.) and were eliminated in the second round. Over the course of the season, Orsi Toth played in 12 matches (19 sets) and recorded a hitting percentage of 0.23, slightly below her team's average of 0.27.

After one season with Altamura, Orsi Toth left to join another Serie A1 team, Tena Volley Santeramo. Santeramo ended the 2008–09 regular season ranked 12th out of the 14 teams and thus managed to stay just ahead of the relegation cutoff. They were knocked out of the Serie A1 Italian Cup by Foppapedretti Bergamo in the second round. Orsi Toth played in 24 matches (82 sets) for Santeramo in total, posting a hitting percentage of 0.15, which was well below her team's average of 0.27.

After two seasons in the top division, Orsi Toth signed a deal in 2009 to play for Professionecasa Valenzano in the Serie B1. She transferred to another Serie B1 side, Asti Volley, the following year.

=== International ===
Orsi Toth was named to the 14-man national under-18 team roster for the 2007 Girls' Youth European Volleyball Championship. Italy won the bronze medal, following a loss to Serbia in the semifinals and a victory against Belgium in the bronze-medal match. Orsi Toth went on to represent her country again at the 2007 U18 World Championship. Italy finished 12th out of the 16 teams in the tournament, with Orsi Toth posting a 0.315 kill percentage (32nd out of 179 players) and averaging 0.31 blocks per set (52nd out of 168 players). The following year, Orsi Toth was called up to the 12-man national under-20 squad for the 2008 Women's Junior European Volleyball Championship. Italy faced Russia in the finals, beating them in three straight sets to win the tournament. Orsi Toth played in the championship match as a substitute in the second set but did not score any points.

== Beach career ==
=== 2010: Transition to beach ===
"I've always said that I am not suitable to this sport. I was born in Hungary, a land-locked country where, as I child, I never got to see a beach or the sea. I have a light skin, and I can't stand the sun for a long time. So, when I first started, I thought this was definitely not the thing I was meant to do in life."

— Orsi Toth on her difficult beginnings with beach volleyball.

Orsi Toth was not selected to the indoor national team in 2010, and so she began exploring other options. In March, she accepted an offer to try out beach volleyball for a few months with the beach national team. Her transition to beach volleyball was not smooth, and at first, Orsi Toth did not like the sport and felt that she had no future in it. She noted that, for her, the taxing sport "had turned into some kind of a daily torture." She persevered nonetheless, taking it as a personal challenge to push herself beyond her comfort zone.

She made her international beach volleyball debut in June, teaming up with Marta Menegatti at the 2010 Beach Volleyball World University Championships in Alanya, Turkey; they finished in ninth place. The duo went on to compete at the U21 World Championships that September, claiming the silver medal following a three-set loss to the American team of Tara Roenicke and Summer Ross in the finals.

=== 2011–2012: World Tour debut ===
By May 2011, Orsi Toth had quit indoor volleyball to focus solely on the beach game. She joined the women's national team headed by Lissandro Carvalho, who she credits with convincing her to make the switch. In June, she partnered with Giada Benazzi to compete in her first World Championships at the 2011 edition held in Rome. The duo received a wild card into the main draw where they were seeded 48th; they did not win any of their group stage matches and finished tied for 37th. Orsi Toth was also paired with Laura Giombini two months later at the 2011 Summer Universiade in Shenzhen, China, where they finished seventh. She made her FIVB World Tour debut playing with Giombini at the $190K Hague Open in August, but did not progress past the qualifying rounds. At the $190K Phuket Open in November, Orsi Toth and Giombini beat Jamie Broder and Kristina May of Canada, as well as Andrezza Martins and Cristine Santanna of Georgia in the qualifiers to advance to Orsi Toth's first main draw on the World Tour. They lost their first two matches in the main draw and did not progress further. Orsi Toth concluded her first season on the World Tour ranked No. 89 in the world with Giombini.

Orsi Toth and Giombini did not make it out of the qualifiers in five of the six World Tour events they entered in 2012. They were given a wild card into the main draw of the $300K Rome Grand Slam in June as the No. 32 seeds. Despite losing two of their three group stage matches, the pair advanced to the knockout rounds following a forfeit by Canada's Heather Bansley and Elizabeth Maloney, but were defeated in the first round by their fifth-seeded compatriots Greta Cicolari and Marta Menegatti. At the end of the month, Orsi Toth and Giombini were one of two teams—the other being Daniela Gioria and Giulia Momoli—to represent Italy at the FIVB World Cup Olympic Qualification Tournament. (Note: The FIVB World Cup Olympic Qualification Tournament saw 11 countries, each represented by two pairs, separated into two pools to compete against each other in a round-robin format. The top country of each pool then played a final match-up against the second-place country of the other pool, and each match-up winner won one of the last two available Olympic spots. Pairs who were already qualified for the 2012 Summer Olympics were not allowed to participate.) Italy advanced to the final country match-up where they lost against the Netherlands, and thus did not win one of the remaining qualification spots for the 2012 Summer Olympics. Orsi Toth and Giombini ended the year 59th in the world rankings.

=== 2013: Partnering with Menegatti ===
The start of the 2013 season saw Orsi Toth competing at the $220K Corrientes Grand Slam with Cicolari, followed by the $220K Rome Grand Slam with Benazzi; she did not make it out of the group stage in either tournament. Her breakthrough came midway through 2013, when the national team coach decided to separate Cicolari and Menegatti—the top Italian women's team at the time—and paired Menegatti with Orsi Toth instead. The new pairing entered the $220K Long Beach Grand Slam in July where they did not win any of their group stage matches and exited the tournament tied for 25th. Orsi Toth and Menegatti's results improved after Long Beach, with fourth-place finishes at the $220K Moscow and São Paulo Grand Slams. Having only played five international events as a team, they wrapped up their first season together ranked No. 44 in the world.

=== 2014–2015: First World Tour title ===
At the beginning of 2014, Carvalho abruptly left the national team programme and his coaching duties were handed over to Paulo "Paulao" Moreira Da Costa. Orsi Toth and Menegatti had a slow start to the season, failing to reach the podium in their first ten World Tour events. They were further setback and forced to skip a tournament when Orsi Toth sprained her ankle mid-season. The duo finally earned their first World Tour medal as a team—after 15 previous attempts—at the $400K São Paulo Grand Slam in September. Seeded 11th, they upset the second-seeded Kerri Walsh Jennings and April Ross of the United States in the quarterfinals, followed by the ninth-seeded Madelein Meppelink and Marleen van Iersel of the Netherlands in the semifinals. In the finals against Brazil's seven-seeded Larissa França and Talita Antunes, Orsi Toth and Menegatti were unable to capitalise on several match points, eventually losing with a score of 21–18, 21–23, 19–21. The pair also took part in the European Championships, finishing fifth with a three-set loss to Meppelink and van Iersel in the quarterfinals. Overall, it was a season of "near-misses" which saw them lose a number of key tiebreaker sets. At the end of 2014, they were ranked tenth in the world.

Carvalho returned as their coach in early 2015, and Orsi Toth and Menegatti started off the year with a bronze medal at the $300K Moscow Grand Slam in May. However, Menegatti was troubled by injuries in the first half of the season, and they could not repeat the Moscow feat in their next eight tournaments, failing to advance to the knockout stage in three of them. They also had to skip the 2015 European Championships in July due to an abdominal problem sustained by Menegatti. Their results got better in September when they won their first World Tour title at the $75K Sochi Open, coming back from a five-point deficit in the first set to beat Isabelle Forrer and Anouk Vergé-Dépré of Switzerland in two sets. The gold medal in Sochi made them the first Italian women's team to ever win a World Tour event. Orsi Toth and Menegatti went on to medal at their next two tournaments, with a bronze at the $75K Puerto Vallarta Open and a silver at the $75K Antalya Open. They closed out the year with an improved world ranking of No. 8.

=== 2016: Qualifying for the Rio Olympics, doping violation ===
Orsi Toth and Menegatti did not medal on the World Tour in 2016; their highest finish was a fourth at the $75K Sochi Open, as well as fifth-place finishes at three $400K Majors. They qualified for the 2016 Summer Olympics in Rio de Janeiro on 13 June 2016 via their Olympic ranking points. The pair were ranked No. 7 in the world at the time, a career-best for Orsi Toth. On 2 August, three days before the start of the Olympics, Orsi Toth was found to have tested positive for clostebol, an anabolic steroid that is banned by the World Anti-Doping Agency. The positive sample came from an out-of-competition doping test conducted by the Italian Anti-Doping Organization on 19 July 2016. Orsi Toth was thus suspended from competition by the first chamber of Italy's National Anti-Doping Tribunal (TNA). A counter-analysis was performed the day after the initial announcement and confirmed the positive result. Orsi Toth was replaced by Laura Giombini at the Olympics, (Note: Rebecca Perry, a 1.91 m (6 ft 3 in) Italian-American blocker, was initially selected as Orsi Toth's replacement. However, Perry was found by the Fédération Internationale de Volleyball (FIVB) to be ineligible as she had not participated in the required 12 FIVB tournaments during the qualification period. Thus Giombini, Perry's partner at the time, was selected instead.) and Menegatti and Giombini went on to finish ninth in the tournament.

Orsi Toth has strenuously maintained her innocence. According to her, the amount of clostebol found in the positive samples were minimal and she does not know how she came into contact with the banned substance, given that no traces of the substance were found in her cosmetics, supplements or food. Several other athletes have tested positive for clostebol due to the use of a dermatological cream called Trofodermin, and when news first broke of Orsi Toth's positive doping test, the then president of FIPAV, Carlo Magri, had attributed it to the careless use of a cream. However, Orsi Toth maintains that she was very careful and never used Trofodermin.

=== 2016–2018: Suspension ===
Orsi Toth was initially handed a four-year doping ban by the first chamber of the TNA in February 2017. She filed an appeal with the second chamber and the ban was later reduced to two years: from 19 July 2016 to 18 July 2018. Orsi Toth did not train for the majority of her suspension and at some point had considered leaving beach volleyball permanently. In an interview with La Gazzetta dello Sport in July 2018, she said she had spent this period finding interests in her life outside of sports and was about to graduate from her physical education studies. Meanwhile, Orsi Toth's former teammate Menegatti struggled to medal on the international circuit with other partners. Around mid-2017, the two began discussing plans to restart their partnership after the ban ended, and Orsi Toth went back to training two months prior to her return to competition.

=== 2018–present: Comeback ===
"I just resumed training a few months ago and I was trying to enjoy every session because I knew it could end soon. And now, I just keep enjoying every second. This victory means a lot to me, but honestly, I'm just happy to be playing again."

— Orsi Toth on her team's victory over world No. 1 Bansley and Wilkerson.

On 18 July 2018, Orsi Toth's two-year ban ended and she resumed her partnership with Menegatti, now coached by Terenzio Feroleto. Orsi Toth made her return to international competition later that month at the $50K Agadir Open, which she and Menegatti won as the No. 13 seeds. The following week, Orsi Toth and Mengatti were given a wild card into the main draw of the $300K Vienna Major as the 31st seeds. In the group stage, they upset the second-seeded Heather Bansley and Brandie Wilkerson of Canada, and the 15th-seeded Nina Betschart and Tanja Huberli of Switzerland to top their group. They advanced to the Round of 16 where they were knocked out of the tournament by Sara Hughes and Summer Ross of the United States. Overall, the pair posted top-ten finishes in all seven World Tour events they entered, including a second-place finish at the $75K Qinzhou Open in October. They concluded the year ranked No. 25 in the world.

== Style of play ==
Orsi Toth is a blocker and a right-handed right-side player. According to the Italian sports news website OA Sport, she possesses a strong serve and has made strides in her blocking and attacking. OA Sport noted that early on in her career, she relied too heavily on outpowering rather than outsmarting opponents, but has since limited her attacking errors. Of the 111 players who competed in a Major Series main draw on the 2016 World Tour, Orsi Toth was ranked 18th for total points scored, averaging 7.54 points per set; 48th for number of aces, with around 4.75% of her serves being aces; and third for total blocks, averaging 1.69 blocks per set. OA Sport noted that Orsi Toth's biggest strength is her mental toughness.

In her partnership with Menegatti, opponents almost always serve Orsi Toth as they fear the more experienced Menegatti. This led Orsi Toth to initially struggle with fatigue during tournaments, although she felt better prepared for this by the pair's second season together. Menegatti has described Orsi Toth as a calmer player compared to herself, and said that Orsi Toth's down-to-earth demeanor keeps her grounded as well.

== Career statistics ==
=== World Tour finals: 5 (2–3) ===
Legend
$400,000 tournaments (0–1)
$300,000 tournaments (0–0)
$190,000 tournaments (0–0)
$75,000 tournaments (1–2)
$50,000 tournaments (1–0)

| Result | W–L | Date | Tournament | Tier | Partner | Opponents | Score |
|---|---|---|---|---|---|---|---|
| Loss | 0–1 | Sep 2014 | São Paulo Grand Slam | $400K | Marta Menegatti | (Brazil) Larissa França (Brazil) Talita Antunes | 21–18, 21–23, 19–21 (0:55) |
| Win | 1–1 | Sep 2015 | Sochi Open | $75K | Marta Menegatti | (Switzerland) Isabelle Forrer (Switzerland) Anouk Vergé-Dépré | 21–19, 21–16 (0:41) |
| Loss | 1–2 | Oct 2015 | Antalya Open | $75K | Marta Menegatti | (Czech Republic) Markéta Sluková (Czech Republic) Barbora Hermannová | 15–21, 17–21 (0:40) |
| Win | 2–2 | Jul 2018 | Agadir, Morocco | $50K | Marta Menegatti | (Czech Republic) Martina Bonnerova (Czech Republic) Sarka Nakladalova | 19–21, 21–19, 15–12 (0:56) |
| Loss | 2–3 | Oct 2018 | Qinzhou, China | $75K | Marta Menegatti | (Brazil) Rebecca Cavalcanti (Brazil) Ana Patricia Silva | 21–18, 15–21, 12–15 (0:44) |

=== Performance timeline ===
Key

| W | Won | F | Finalist | SF | Semi-finalist |
| QF | Quarter-finalist | #R | Rounds 4, 3, 2, 1 | RR | Round-robin stage |
| Q# | Qualification round | A | Absent | w/d | Withdrew |
| G | Gold | S | Silver | B | Bronze |
| NH | Not held | N/A | Not applicable | DNQ | Did not qualify |

Current through the 2018 FIVB World Tour Finals.

| Tournament | 2011 | 2012 | 2013 | 2014 | 2015 | 2016 | 2017 | 2018 | SR | W–L | Win % |
|---|---|---|---|---|---|---|---|---|---|---|---|
| World Championships | RR (0–3) | NH | A | NH | 2R (4–1) | NH | A | NH | 0 / 2 | 4–4 | 50% |
| European Championships | A | A | A | QF (4–2) | A | 1R (3–1) | A | A | 0 / 2 | 7–3 | 70% |
Career statistics
| Titles / Finals | 0 / 0 | 0 / 0 | 0 / 0 | 0 / 0 | 0 / 0 | 0 / 0 | 0 / 0 | 0 / 0 | 0 / 0 | | |
| Overall win–loss | 0–3 | 0–0 | 0–0 | 4–2 | 4–1 | 3–1 | 0–0 | 0–0 | 11–7 | | |
| Year-end ranking | 89 | 59 | 44 | 10 | 8 | 10 | N/A | 25 | 61% | | |

Note: Only main draw results are considered.
