= Beach volleyball at the Mediterranean Games =

The Beach volleyball Mediterranean Games Tournament was first Contested in the 15th Mediterranean Games Event in Spain, Almería for both men and women.

== Men's tournament ==
=== History ===
| Year | Location | Gold | Silver | Bronze |
|---|---|---|---|---|
| 2005; Details | Almería, Spain | (Italy); Riccardo Lione / Matteo Varnier | (Spain); Alex Ortiz Vargas / Raul Aro Perez | (Spain); Jésus Manuel Ruiz Nunez / Agusta Correa Hdez |
| 2009; Details | Pescara, Italy | (Spain); Manuel Carrasco / Jesús Ruiz | (Spain); José Manuel Ariza / Miguel Ángel de Amo | (Italy); Matteo Ingrosso / Paolo Ingrosso |
| 2013; Details | Mersin, Turkey | (Turkey); Murat Giginoğlu / Selçuk Şekerci | (Spain); Adrián Gavira / Pablo Herrera | (France); Yannick Salvetti / Jean-Baptiste Daguerre |
| 2018; Details | Tarragona, Spain | (Turkey); Murat Giginoğlu / Volkan Göğtepe | (Italy); Marco Caminati / Enrico Rossi | (Turkey); Hasan Hüseyin Mermer / Sefa Urlu |

== Men, Medals Summary ==
| Rank | Nation | Gold | Silver | Bronze | Total |
|---|---|---|---|---|---|
| 1 | Turkey (TUR) | 2 | 0 | 1 | 3 |
| 2 | Spain (ESP) | 1 | 3 | 1 | 5 |
| 3 | Italy (ITA) | 1 | 1 | 1 | 3 |
| 4 | France (FRA) | 0 | 0 | 1 | 1 |
| Totals (4 entries) | | 4 | 4 | 4 | 12 |

== Women's tournament ==
=== History ===
| Year | Location | Gold | Silver | Bronze |
|---|---|---|---|---|
| 2005; Details | Almería, Spain | (France); Morgane Faure / Virginie Sarpaux | (Spain); Cati Pol Martí / Julia Mandaña Codina | (Italy); Gaia Cicola / Margherita Reniero |
| 2009; Details | Pescara, Italy | (Spain); Cristina Hopf Aguilar / Alejandra Simón | (Italy); Greta Cicolari / Lucia Bacchi | (France); Morgane Faure / Mathilde Giordano |
| 2013; Details | Mersin, Turkey | (Italy); Greta Cicolari / Marta Menegatti | (Greece); Vassiliki Arvaniti / Panagiota Karagkouni | (Italy); Daniela Gioria / Laura Giombini |
| 2018; Details | Tarragona, Spain | (Spain); María Carro / Paula Soria | (France); Aline Chamereau / Alexandra Jupiter | (Spain); Amaranta Fernández / Ángela Lobato |

== Women, Medals Summary ==
| Rank | Nation | Gold | Silver | Bronze | Total |
|---|---|---|---|---|---|
| 1 | Spain (ESP) | 2 | 1 | 1 | 4 |
| 2 | Italy (ITA) | 1 | 1 | 2 | 4 |
| 3 | France (FRA) | 1 | 1 | 1 | 3 |
| 4 | Greece (GRE) | 0 | 1 | 0 | 1 |
| Totals (4 entries) | | 4 | 4 | 4 | 12 |
