= Menegatti =

Menegatti is a surname of Italian origin. Notable people with the surname include:

- Beppe Menegatti (1929–2024), Italian theatre director
- Marta Menegatti (born 1990), Italian beach volleyball player
- Pietro Menegatti (born 1992), Italian footballer
