= 2019 FIVB Women's Beach Volleyball Intercontinental Olympic Qualification Tournament =

2019 Women's Intercontinental Olympic Qualification Tournament
Tournament details
- Host country: China
- City: Haiyang
- Dates: 18–23 September 2019
- Teams: 16
- Venue: 1 (in 1 host city)

The 2019 FIVB Women's Beach Volleyball Intercontinental Olympic Qualification Tournament was a volleyball tournament for women's beach volleyball players organised by Fédération Internationale de Volleyball (FIVB), held in September 2019. 16 teams played in the tournament, where the top 2 teams qualified to the 2020 Olympic volleyball tournament.

== Qualification ==
Mean of qualification	Country	Qualifier	Seed
Host country	China	Xia Xinyi–Wang Fan	1
FIVB World Ranking	Brazil	Ângela Lavalle–Carolina Horta Máximo	2
FIVB World Ranking	Canada	Heather Bansley–Brandie Wilkerson	3
FIVB World Ranking	Australia	Becchara Palmer–Nicole Laird	4
FIVB World Ranking	Netherlands	Sanne Keizer–Madelein Meppelink	5
FIVB World Ranking	Switzerland	Anouk Vergé-Dépré–Joana Heidrich	6
FIVB World Ranking	Italy	Marta Menegatti–Viktoria Orsi Toth	7
FIVB World Ranking	Russia	Maria Voronina–Maria Bocharova	8
FIVB World Ranking	Czech Republic	Barbora Hermannová–Markéta Sluková	9
FIVB World Ranking	Spain	Liliana Fernández–Elsa Baquerizo	10
FIVB World Ranking	Latvia	Tīna Graudiņa–Anastasija Kravčenoka	11
FIVB World Ranking	~~Slovakia~~	~~Andrea Štrbová–Natália Dubovcová~~	~~12~~
FIVB World Ranking	Finland	Taru Lahti-Liukkonen–Anniina Parkkinen	13
FIVB World Ranking	Germany	Sandra Ittlinger–Chantal Laboureur	14
FIVB World Ranking	Japan	Miki Koshikawa–Megumi Murakami	15
FIVB World Ranking	Austria	Plesiutschnig–Schützenhöfer	16
Reallocation	Poland	Katarzyna Kociołek–Kinga Wojtasik	12

== Pools composition ==
=== First round ===
Teams were seeded following the Serpentine system according to their FIVB Beach Volleyball World Rankings as of 16 July 2019.

Pool A	Pool B	Pool C	Pool D
(China) X.Y. Xia–Wang	(Brazil) Ângela–Carolina Horta	(Canada) Bansley–Brandie	(Australia) Palmer–Laird
(Russia) Voronina–Bocharova	(Italy) Menegatti–Orsi Toth	(Switzerland) Vergé-Dépré–Heidrich	(Netherlands) Keizer–Meppelink
(Czech Republic) Hermannová–Sluková	(Spain) Liliana–Elsa	(Latvia) Graudiņa–Kravčenoka	(Poland) Kociołek–Wojtasik
(Austria) Plesiutschnig–Schützenhöfer	(Japan) Koshikawa–Murakami	(Germany) Ittlinger–Laboureur	(Finland) Lahti–Parkkinen

=== Second round ===
Pool E		Pool F		Pool G		Pool H	
1A	(Czech Republic) Hermannová–Sluková	1B	(Italy) Menegatti–Orsi Toth	1C	(Germany) Ittlinger–Laboureur	1D	(Netherlands) Keizer–Meppelink
2D	(Finland) Lahti–Parkkinen	2C	(Switzerland) Vergé-Dépré–Heidrich	2B	(Spain) Liliana–Elsa	2A	(China) X.Y. Xia–Wang
3A	(Austria) Plesiutschnig–Schützenhöfer	3D	(Poland) Kociołek–Wojtasik	3B	(Brazil) Ângela–Carolina Horta	3C	(Latvia) Graudiņa–Kravčenoka

=== Third round ===
Pool I		Pool J	
1E	(Czech Republic) Hermannová–Sluková	1F	(Italy) Menegatti–Orsi Toth
1H	(China) X.Y. Xia–Wang	1G	(Germany) Ittlinger–Laboureur
2F	(Poland) Kociołek–Wojtasik	2E	(Austria) Plesiutschnig–Schützenhöfer
2G	(Spain) Liliana–Elsa	2H	(Latvia) Graudiņa–Kravčenoka

== First round ==
- All times are China Standard Time (UTC+08:00).

=== Pool A ===
Semifinals
(China) X.Y. Xia–Wang	2
(Austria) Plesiutschnig–Schützenhöfer	0
(Russia) Voronina–Bocharova	0
(Czech Republic) Hermannová–Sluková	2

Winner final
(China) X.Y. Xia–Wang	0
(Czech Republic) Hermannová–Sluková	2
Loser final
(Austria) Plesiutschnig–Schützenhöfer	2
(Russia) Voronina–Bocharova	1

==== Semifinals ====
Date	Time		Score		Set 1	Set 2	Set 3	Total	Report
18 Sep	8:30	Voronina–Bocharova (Russia)	0–2	(Czech Republic) Hermannová–Sluková	12–21	7–21		28–42	
18 Sep	9:00	X.Y. Xia–Wang (China)	2–0	(Austria) Plesiutschnig–Schützenhöfer	21–19	21–15		42–34	

==== Final ====
Date	Time		Score		Set 1	Set 2	Set 3	Total	Report
18 Sep	14:00	Plesiutschnig–Schützenhöfer (Austria)	2–1	(Russia) Voronina–Bocharova	21–18	10–21	15–12	46–51	
18 Sep	14:00	X.Y. Xia–Wang (China)	0–2	(Czech Republic) Hermannová–Sluková	12–21	21–23		33–43	

==== Standing ====
Pos	Team	Pld	W	L	Pts	SW	SL	SR	SPW	SPL	SPR	Qualification
1	(Czech Republic) Hermannová–Sluková	2	2	0	4	4	0	MAX	86	52	1.654	Second round
2	(China) X.Y. Xia–Wang	2	1	1	3	2	2	1.000	75	78	0.962	Second round
3	(Austria) Plesiutschnig–Schützenhöfer	2	1	1	3	2	3	0.667	80	93	0.860	Second round
4	(Russia) Voronina–Bocharova	2	0	2	2	1	4	0.250	70	88	0.795	

=== Pool B ===
Semifinals
(Brazil) Ângela–Carolina Horta	2
(Japan) Koshikawa–Murakami	1
(Italy) Menegatti–Orsi Toth	2
(Spain) Liliana–Elsa	1

Winner final
(Brazil) Ângela–Carolina Horta	0
(Italy) Menegatti–Orsi Toth	2
Loser final
(Japan) Koshikawa–Murakami	1
(Spain) Liliana–Elsa	2

==== Semifinal ====
Date	Time		Score		Set 1	Set 2	Set 3	Total	Report
18 Sep	11:30	Ângela–Carolina Horta (Brazil)	2–1	(Japan) Koshikawa–Murakami	21–16	18–21	15–7	54–44	
18 Sep	12:00	Menegatti–Orsi Toth (Italy)	2–1	(Spain) Liliana–Elsa	24–26	24–22	15–12	63–60	

==== Final ====
Date	Time		Score		Set 1	Set 2	Set 3	Total	Report
18 Sep	16:00	Ângela–Carolina Horta (Brazil)	0–2	(Italy) Menegatti–Orsi Toth	19–21	16–21		35–42	
18 Sep	16:00	Koshikawa–Murakami (Japan)	1–2	(Spain) Liliana–Elsa	21–18	21–23	5–15	47–56	

==== Standing ====
Pos	Team	Pld	W	L	Pts	SW	SL	SR	SPW	SPL	SPR	Qualification
1	(Italy) Menegatti–Orsi Toth	2	2	0	4	4	1	4.000	105	95	1.105	Second round
2	(Spain) Liliana–Elsa	2	1	1	3	3	3	1.000	116	110	1.055	Second round
3	(Brazil) Ângela–Carolina Horta	2	1	1	3	2	3	0.667	89	86	1.035	Second round
4	(Japan) Koshikawa–Murakami	2	0	2	2	2	4	0.500	91	110	0.827	

=== Pool C ===
Semifinals
(Canada) Bansley–Brandie	0
(Germany) Ittlinger–Laboureur	2
(Switzerland) Vergé-Dépré–Heidrich	2
(Latvia) Graudiņa–Kravčenoka	0

Winner final
(Germany) Ittlinger–Laboureur	2
(Switzerland) Vergé-Dépré–Heidrich	1
Loser final
(Canada) Bansley–Brandie	1
(Latvia) Graudiņa–Kravčenoka	2

==== Semifinal ====
Date	Time		Score		Set 1	Set 2	Set 3	Total	Report
18 Sep	9:20	Bansley–Brandie (Canada)	0–2	(Germany) Ittlinger–Laboureur	15–21	18–21		33–42	
18 Sep	9:20	Vergé-Dépré–Heidrich (Switzerland)	2–0	(Latvia) Graudiņa–Kravčenoka	21–19	21–18		42–37	

==== Final ====
Date	Time		Score		Set 1	Set 2	Set 3	Total	Report
18 Sep	13:00	Bansley–Brandie (Canada)	1–2	(Latvia) Graudiņa–Kravčenoka	12–21	21–16	14–16	47–53	
18 Sep	13:00	Ittlinger–Laboureur (Germany)	2–1	(Switzerland) Vergé-Dépré–Heidrich	13–21	21–14	15–11	49–46	

==== Standing ====
Pos	Team	Pld	W	L	Pts	SW	SL	SR	SPW	SPL	SPR	Qualification
1	(Germany) Ittlinger–Laboureur	2	2	0	4	4	1	4.000	91	79	1.152	Second round
2	(Switzerland) Vergé-Dépré–Heidrich	2	1	1	3	3	2	1.500	88	86	1.023	Second round
3	(Latvia) Graudiņa–Kravčenoka	2	1	1	3	2	3	0.667	90	89	1.011	Second round
4	(Canada) Bansley–Brandie	2	0	2	2	1	4	0.250	80	95	0.842	

=== Pool D ===
Semifinals
(Australia) Palmer–Laird	0
(Finland) Lahti–Parkkinen	2
(Netherlands) Keizer–Meppelink	2
(Poland) Kociołek–Wojtasik	1

Winner final
(Finland) Lahti–Parkkinen	1
(Netherlands) Keizer–Meppelink	2
Loser final
(Australia) Palmer–Laird	1
(Poland) Kociołek–Wojtasik	2

==== Semifinal ====
Date	Time		Score		Set 1	Set 2	Set 3	Total	Report
18 Sep	10:20	Palmer–Laird (Australia)	0–2	(Finland) Lahti–Parkkinen	11–21	11–21		22–42	
18 Sep	10:50	Keizer–Meppelink (Netherlands)	2–0	(Poland) Kociołek–Wojtasik	21–16	21–14		42–30	

==== Final ====
Date	Time		Score		Set 1	Set 2	Set 3	Total	Report
18 Sep	14:50	Palmer–Laird (Australia)	1–2	(Poland) Kociołek–Wojtasik	17–21	21–11	6–15	44–47	
18 Sep	14:50	Lahti–Parkkinen (Finland)	1–2	(Netherlands) Keizer–Meppelink	21–18	19–21	13–15	53–54	

==== Standing ====
Pos	Team	Pld	W	L	Pts	SW	SL	SR	SPW	SPL	SPR	Qualification
1	(Netherlands) Keizer–Meppelink	2	2	0	4	4	1	4.000	96	83	1.157	Second round
2	(Finland) Lahti–Parkkinen	2	1	1	3	3	2	1.500	95	76	1.250	Second round
3	(Poland) Kociołek–Wojtasik	2	1	1	3	2	3	0.667	77	86	0.895	Second round
4	(Australia) Palmer–Laird	2	0	2	2	1	4	0.250	66	89	0.742	

== Second round ==
- All times are China Standard Time (UTC+08:00).

=== Pool E ===
Pos	Team	Pld	W	L	Pts	SW	SL	SR	SPW	SPL	SPR	Qualification
1	(Czech Republic) Hermannová–Sluková	2	2	0	4	4	0	MAX	84	58	1.448	Third round
2	(Austria) Plesiutschnig–Schützenhöfer	2	1	1	3	2	3	0.667	87	95	0.916	Third round
3	(Finland) Lahti–Parkkinen	2	0	2	2	1	4	0.250	79	97	0.814	

Date	Time		Score		Set 1	Set 2	Set 3	Total	Report
19 Sep	9:50	Hermannová–Sluková (Czech Republic)	2–0	(Austria) Plesiutschnig–Schützenhöfer	21–16	21–16		42–32	
19 Sep	13:00	Lahti–Parkkinen (Finland)	1–2	(Austria) Plesiutschnig–Schützenhöfer	21–18	18–21	14–16	53–55	
19 Sep	15:50	Hermannová–Sluková (Czech Republic)	2–0	(Finland) Lahti–Parkkinen	21–12	21–14		42–26	

=== Pool F ===
Pos	Team	Pld	W	L	Pts	SW	SL	SR	SPW	SPL	SPR	Qualification
1	(Italy) Menegatti–Orsi Toth	2	2	0	4	4	1	4.000	100	94	1.064	Third round
2	(Poland) Kociołek–Wojtasik	2	1	1	3	3	3	1.000	111	110	1.009	Third round
3	(Switzerland) Vergé-Dépré–Heidrich	2	0	2	2	1	4	0.250	94	101	0.931	

Date	Time		Score		Set 1	Set 2	Set 3	Total	Report
19 Sep	9:50	Menegatti–Orsi Toth (Italy)	2–1	(Poland) Kociołek–Wojtasik	24–22	17–21	15–11	56–54	
19 Sep	13:00	Vergé-Dépré–Heidrich (Switzerland)	1–2	(Poland) Kociołek–Wojtasik	21–18	22–24	11–15	54–57	
19 Sep	15:50	Menegatti–Orsi Toth (Italy)	2–0	(Switzerland) Vergé-Dépré–Heidrich	23–21	21–19		44–40	

=== Pool G ===
Pos	Team	Pld	W	L	Pts	SW	SL	SR	SPW	SPL	SPR	Qualification
1	(Germany) Ittlinger–Laboureur	2	2	0	4	4	0	MAX	86	64	1.344	Third round
2	(Spain) Liliana–Elsa	2	1	1	3	2	2	1.000	82	80	1.025	Third round
3	(Brazil) Ângela–Carolina Horta	2	0	2	2	0	4	0.000	60	84	0.714	

Date	Time		Score		Set 1	Set 2	Set 3	Total	Report
19 Sep	9:50	Ittlinger–Laboureur (Germany)	2–0	(Spain) Liliana–Elsa	23–21	21–19		44–40	
19 Sep	13:00	Ângela–Carolina Horta (Brazil)	0–2	(Spain) Liliana–Elsa	19–21	17–21		36–42	
19 Sep	15:50	Ittlinger–Laboureur (Germany)	2–0	(Brazil) Ângela–Carolina Horta	21–14	21–10		42–24	

=== Pool H ===
Pos	Team	Pld	W	L	Pts	SW	SL	SR	SPW	SPL	SPR	Qualification
1	(China) X.Y. Xia–Wang	2	2	0	4	4	1	4.000	110	104	1.058	Third round
2	(Latvia) Graudiņa–Kravčenoka	2	1	1	3	3	2	1.500	109	102	1.069	Third round
3	(Netherlands) Keizer–Meppelink	2	0	2	2	0	4	0.000	71	84	0.845	

Date	Time		Score		Set 1	Set 2	Set 3	Total	Report
19 Sep	9:50	Keizer–Meppelink (Netherlands)	0–2	(Latvia) Graudiņa–Kravčenoka	18–21	16–21		34–42	
19 Sep	13:00	X.Y. Xia–Wang (China)	2–1	(Latvia) Graudiņa–Kravčenoka	22–20	18–21	28–26	68–67	
19 Sep	15:50	Keizer–Meppelink (Netherlands)	0–2	(China) X.Y. Xia–Wang	19–21	18–21		37–42	

== Third round ==
- All times are China Standard Time (UTC+08:00).

=== Pool I ===
Pos	Team	Pld	W	L	Pts	SW	SL	SR	SPW	SPL	SPR	Qualification
1	(Spain) Liliana–Elsa	3	3	0	6	6	1	6.000	136	122	1.115	Final 1
2	(Czech Republic) Hermannová–Sluková	3	2	1	5	4	2	2.000	127	113	1.124	Final 2
3	(Poland) Kociołek–Wojtasik	3	1	2	4	2	5	0.400	112	130	0.862	
4	(China) X.Y. Xia–Wang	3	0	3	3	2	6	0.333	131	141	0.929	

Date	Time		Score		Set 1	Set 2	Set 3	Total	Report
20 Sep	11:00	Hermannová–Sluková (Czech Republic)	2–0	(Poland) Kociołek–Wojtasik	21–11	21–19		42–30	
20 Sep	11:00	X.Y. Xia–Wang (China)	1–2	(Spain) Liliana–Elsa	21–11	17–21	11–15	49–47	
20 Sep	15:00	Hermannová–Sluková (Czech Republic)	0–2	(Spain) Liliana–Elsa	20–22	23–25		43–47	
20 Sep	15:00	X.Y. Xia–Wang (China)	1–2	(Poland) Kociołek–Wojtasik	21–16	15–21	10–15	46–52	
21 Sep	11:30	Hermannová–Sluková (Czech Republic)	2–0	(China) X.Y. Xia–Wang	21–18	21–18		42–36	
21 Sep	11:30	Liliana–Elsa (Spain)	2–0	(Poland) Kociołek–Wojtasik	21–12	21–18		42–30	

=== Pool J ===
Pos	Team	Pld	W	L	Pts	SW	SL	SR	SPW	SPL	SPR	Qualification
1	(Latvia) Graudiņa–Kravčenoka	3	2	1	5	4	2	2.000	120	105	1.143	Final 2
2	(Germany) Ittlinger–Laboureur	3	2	1	5	4	4	1.000	139	139	1.000	Final 1
3	(Italy) Menegatti–Orsi Toth	3	2	1	5	5	3	1.667	140	137	1.022	
4	(Austria) Plesiutschnig–Schützenhöfer	3	0	3	3	2	6	0.333	130	148	0.878	

Date	Time		Score		Set 1	Set 2	Set 3	Total	Report
20 Sep	12:00	Menegatti–Orsi Toth (Italy)	2–0	(Latvia) Graudiņa–Kravčenoka	21–17	21–19		42–36	
20 Sep	12:00	Ittlinger–Laboureur (Germany)	2–1	(Austria) Plesiutschnig–Schützenhöfer	15–21	23–21	15–10	53–52	
20 Sep	16:00	Menegatti–Orsi Toth (Italy)	2–0	(Austria) Plesiutschnig–Schützenhöfer	17–21	21–13	15–12	53–46	
20 Sep	16:00	Ittlinger–Laboureur (Germany)	0–2	(Latvia) Graudiņa–Kravčenoka	16–21	15–21		31–42	
21 Sep	12:45	Menegatti–Orsi Toth (Italy)	1–2	(Germany) Ittlinger–Laboureur	15–21	21–19	9–15	45–55	
21 Sep	12:45	Plesiutschnig–Schützenhöfer (Austria)	0–2	(Latvia) Graudiņa–Kravčenoka	19–21	13–21		32–42	

== Final round ==
- All times are China Standard Time (UTC+08:00).

=== Final 1 ===
Date	Time		Score		Set 1	Set 2	Set 3	Total	Report
22 Sep	10:00	Liliana–Elsa (Spain)	2–1	(Germany) Ittlinger–Laboureur	18–21	21–17	15–10	54–48	

=== Final 2 ===
Date	Time		Score		Set 1	Set 2	Set 3	Total	Report
22 Sep	11:00	Graudiņa–Kravčenoka (Latvia)	2–1	(Czech Republic) Hermannová–Sluková	21–17	15–21	17–15	53–53	

== See also ==
- 2019 FIVB Men's Beach Volleyball Intercontinental Olympic Qualification Tournament
