= Beach volleyball at the 2013 Mediterranean Games =

- Venue: Kızkalesi Beach
- Location: Mersin, Turkey
- Dates: 25-28 June 2013

The beach volleyball tournaments at the 2013 Mediterranean Games in Mersin took place between 25 June and 28 June. Both the men's and the women's tournament were held at the Kızkalesi Beach (Maiden's Castle).

== Medal table ==
* Host nation (Turkey)

Rank	Nation	Gold	Silver	Bronze	Total
1	Italy	1	0	1	2
2	Turkey*	1	0	0	1
3	Greece	0	1	0	1
3	Spain	0	1	0	1
5	France	0	0	1	1
Totals (5 entries)		2	2	2	6

== Medal summary ==
=== Events ===
Event	Gold	Silver	Bronze
Men	Turkey (TUR); Murat Giginoğlu; Selçuk Şekerci	Spain (ESP); Adrián Gavira; Pablo Herrera	France (FRA); Yannick Salvetti; Jean-Baptiste Daguerre
Women	Italy (ITA); Greta Cicolari; Marta Menegatti	Greece (GRE); Vassiliki Arvaniti; Peny Karagkouni	Italy (ITA); Daniela Gioria; Laura Giombini
