= Hannes Jagerhofer =

Austrian entrepreneur

- Jagerhofer during a beach volleyball event
- Born: February 8, 1962 (age 64); Klagenfurt, Carinthia, Austria
- Occupations: CEo, acts group ceo, checkrobin.com
- Years active: 1987–present

Hannes Jagerhofer (born 8 February 1962, in Klagenfurt) is an Austrian entrepreneur, marketing and PR manager, event expert and author. The ACTS Group, founded by him, is one of the most renowned event and communication agencies in Austria. While at the ACTS Group Hannes Jagerhofer founded the Beach Majors GmbH, which was organizing the Beach Volleyball Major Series from 2015 to 2020 together with Red Bull. The Beach Volleyball Major Series was a sports series with the tournaments providing the highest prize money and ranking points of the FIVB World Tour (Major tournaments, FIVB Beach Volleyball World Tour Finals, FIVB Beach Volleyball World Championships).

== Origin and private life ==
Jagerhofer was born in Klagenfurt, Austria, and attended the Lerchenfeld high school in Klagenfurt. He studied medicine and computer science from 1980 to 1984 in Vienna. In 1985, Jagerhofer became self-employed and advanced to become one of the most renowned event managers in Austria.

Jagerhofer is the father of two children and lives with his family in Carinthia, Vienna in Austria and Fort Lauderdale, Florida. The entrepreneur is also a passionate pilot, kite surfer and loves water skiing.

== Business career ==
=== Event management ===
In 1985, Jagerhofer became self-employed and in 1987 organized for the first time sporting events in the area of Carinthia. In the 90s, Jagerhofer made a name for himself as a clubbing organizer. He developed an innovative approach to organizing events in Vienna that had a strong influence on Vienna's nightlife, as reported by a BBC documentary. He organized Austria's first clubbing events in unique locations such as an aircraft hangar at Vienna International Airport, Club Splendid in Vienna, the Meierei in the Vienna City Park and at the Viennese Technisches Museum, where Prince would give a live performance. From 1989 onwards Jagerhofer organized large events for clients – events on behalf of companies such as Lauda Air, Visa and T-Mobile also large and customer events.

In 1990 he founded ACTS Promotional Events GmbH (renamed ACTS Group in 2011). In the years that followed, ACTS was responsible for the conception and implementation of Apple Computer's brand presentation at the CEBIT in Hanover, for the overall conception of the corporate presentation of the brands Sony, Sony Music and Columbia Tristar at the IFA in Berlin, the organization of the Stiegl-Braukunstfeste, the Ö3-Expedition-Großglockner, the opening of the T-Center building in Vienna, the event 15 years Philharmonic coin and much more. Between 2003 and 2005, Jagerhofer operated the ACTS International Inc. branch in Florida and a helicopter shuttle service called HelicopterShuttle.com.

Over the past 20 years, Jagerhofer has organized numerous events in his home region of Carinthia, including, from 1999 to 2004, the Cart City Circuits in Velden, and most recently, from 1996 to 2016 the beach volleyball tournament in Klagenfurt.

==== Teaching activities ====
From 1995 to 2005 Jagerhofer gave seminars at the Ueberreuter Managerakademie on the topic Event management". His book Event Marketing – 10 Steps to Success, published in 1995, was also written during this time. Between 1999 and 2003 Jagerhofer lectured at the College of Marketing & Sales.

=== Checkfelix ===
In 2005 Jagerhofer founded Jabo Software Vertrieb- und Entwicklung GmbH (Sales and Development of Software), which developed the online travel and flight search engine checkfelix.com which he successfully sold to the US travel portal KAYAK in 2011.

=== YPD-Challenge ===
In 2009, Jagerhofer launched an online and offline-based recruiting tool for students called Young Powerful Dynamic (YPD-Challenge). Jagerhofer's concept: to give young people a fair chance in professional life – no matter which background they had. Together with the Danube University Krems (Applied Game Studies) and the Sigmund Freud PrivatUniversität, a multi-level, innovative selection procedure for young professionals was developed. The tool tested lateral thinking, problem solving, and general knowledge, identifying motivated candidates. Selected candidates were awarded internships at over 30 major companies including Apple, Red Bull, Lazard, and Siemens. In 2014 and 2015, a television show on the YPD Challenge aired on ServusTV. The Austrian broadcaster relied on an interactive TV online real-time concept, which contested innovative ways on the Austrian TV market with its second-screen application.

=== Checkrobin ===
In 2012, Hannes Jagerhofer came up with the idea of using the unused space in empty car trunk space as a sensible means of transport during his numerous business trips.

2013, in the age of the sharing economy, he founded the start-up checkrobin.com, the first ride for all kinds of things. A private platform was made available to individual drivers and senders across Austria to send items quickly. Objects can be moved rapidly and unpackaged from A to B, saving unnecessary CO_{2} emissions as well as reducing travel costs.

In 2017, Jagerhofer opened the platform for the whole of Europe under the name myrobin.com; in 2016, a comparison platform for parcel services was added. Checkrobin today cooperates with various parcel and shipping service providers such as DPD, UPS, or Hermes to show its customers the cheapest, fastest, and easiest way to transport parcels to their destination. Since 2018, checkrobin has also been offering the Checkrobin Business extension to provide a shipping platform for commercial mailers. Checkrobin Business is aimed purely at business customers and is currently operating on the German market.

== Beach Volleyball ==
Hannes Jagerhofer is also known as "Mr. Beachvolleyball". In 1996, Jagerhofer organized the first beach volleyball tournament in Klagenfurt. The first Austrian Masters tournament was played in front of 27 visitors on the final day. Jagerhofer lured the fans to the ranks with free beer. The participation of the first international beach volleyball teams at the Austrian Tour stop of the FIVB World Tour 1997 showed the potential of this sport. In 2001 Klagenfurt hosted the third FIVB Beach Volleyball World Championships. This was an important turning point, which not only laid the foundation for beach volleyball in Austria, but also for the future success of the event. From 2002 onwards Klagenfurt was the official venue of the annual FIVB Grand Slam and two European Beach Volleyball Championships in 2013 and 2015. In 2006, the Grand Slam in Klagenfurt was voted the best tournament in the world by the Fédération Internationale de Volleyball.

=== Beach Volleyball Major Series ===
Inspired by the success of the Klagenfurt event, Jagerhofer founded the Beach Majors GmbH, a joint venture between him and Red Bull, organizing the Beach Volleyball Major Series. The Beach Volleyball Major Series was the FIVB World Tour's most highly endowed international sports series (highest prize and highest ranking points). In 2017, a branch of Beach Majors GmbH, the Beach Major USA LLC was opened in Fort Lauderdale, Florida. From 2015 to 2020, the tour stops have been held around the world in Austria, Croatia, Switzerland, Canada, Germany, Norway and the United States.

=== FIVB Beach Volleyball World Championships ===
In 2017, Jagerhofer and the Beach Majors GmbH got the rights to organize the 2017 Beach Volleyball World Championships. This took place on the Danube Island in Vienna on 10 days in front of a total of 180,000 fans – and thus became one of the largest beach volleyball events in the history of the sport. The great success of this event compared the media with the 2016 Summer Olympics in Rio de Janeiro.

From 28 June to 7 July 2019 Jagerhofer hosted the 12th FIVB Beach Volleyball World Championship 2019 in Hamburg, where over 130.000 fans flocked to the famous tennis stadion "Am Rothenbaum".

== See also ==
- Beach Volleyball Major Series
