= Leila Martínez =

Cuban beach volleyball player (born 1994)

Personal information
- Full name: Leila Consuelo Martínez Ortega
- Born: 27 April 1994 (age 32) Havana, Cuba
- Height: 180 cm (5 ft 11 in)

Sport
- Sport: Beach volleyball
Medal record
Representing Cuba
Pan American Games
Silver medal – second place	2015 Toronto	Women's tournament

Leila Consuelo Martínez Ortega (born 27 April 1994) is a Cuban volleyball player.

Martínez was selected to play at the 2020 Summer Olympics in Tokyo alongside Lidiannis Echevarria. The duo won two rounds 2–0.
