= Marta Menegatti =

Italian beach volleyball player

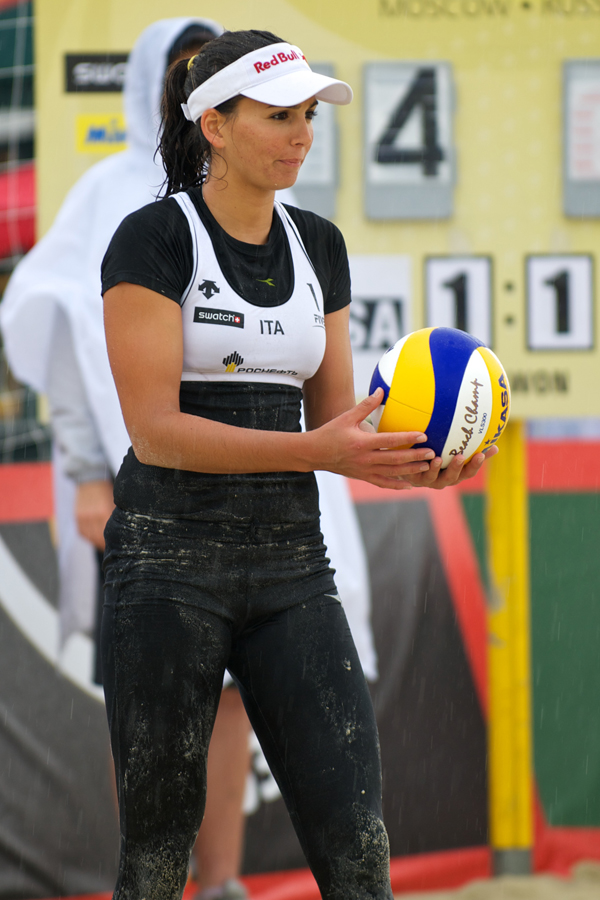
- Menegatti in 2012

Personal information
- National team: Italy
- Born: 16 August 1990 (age 36) Rovigo, Italy
- Years active: 2006–present
- Height: 1.80 m (5 ft 11 in)

Sport
- Sport: Beach volleyball
- Position: Left side/defender
- Partner: Valentina Gottardi (2023–)
- Former partners: Greta Cicolari (2009–13); Laura Giombini (2016, 2018); Rebecca Perry (2017); Viktoria Orsi Toth (2013–16, 2018–)
- Coached by: Lissandro Carvalho (2009–13, 2015–17); Paulo Moreira Da Costa (2014); Terenzio Feroleto (2018–)

Achievements and titles
- Highest world ranking: No. 4 (20 August 2012)
International medals
Women's beach volleyball
Representing Italy
| Event | 1st | 2nd | 3rd |
|---|---|---|---|
| World Tour | 2 | 7 | 7 |
| European Championships | 1 | 1 | 0 |
| Mediterranean Games | 1 | 0 | 0 |
| U21 World Championships | 0 | 1 | 0 |
| U19 World Championships | 0 | 1 | 0 |
| U23 European Championships | 0 | 1 | 0 |
| U20 European Championships | 1 | 0 | 0 |
| Total | 5 | 11 | 7 |
World Tour
| Gold medal – first place | 2015 Sochi | Open |
| Gold medal – first place | 2018 Agadir | 2-star |
| Silver medal – second place | 2010 Phuket | Open |
| Silver medal – second place | 2011 Myslowice | Open |
| Silver medal – second place | 2012 Beijing | Grand Slam |
| Silver medal – second place | 2012 Stare Jablonki | Grand Slam |
| Silver medal – second place | 2014 Klagenfurt | Grand Slam |
| Silver medal – second place | 2015 Antalya | Open |
| Silver medal – second place | 2018 Qinzhou | 3-star |
| Bronze medal – third place | 2011 Gstaad | Grand Slam |
| Bronze medal – third place | 2011 Phuket | Open |
| Bronze medal – third place | 2012 Brasília | Open |
| Bronze medal – third place | 2012 Berlin | Grand Slam |
| Bronze medal – third place | 2015 Moscow | Grand Slam |
| Bronze medal – third place | 2015 Puerto Vallarta | Open |
| Bronze medal – third place | 2018 Shepparton | 1-star |
European Championships
| Gold medal – first place | 2011 Kristiansand | Team |
| Silver medal – second place | 2024 Netherlands | Women's |
Mediterranean Games
| Gold medal – first place | 2013 Mersin | Team |
U21 World Championships
| Silver medal – second place | 2010 Alanya | Team |
U19 World Championships
| Silver medal – second place | 2007 Mysłowice | Team |
U23 European Championships
| Silver medal – second place | 2010 Kos | Team |
U20 European Championships
| Gold medal – first place | 2009 Kos | Team |
- Updated on 30 December 2018

Marta Menegatti (born 16 August 1990) is an Italian beach volleyball player who plays as a left-side defender with her partner Viktoria Orsi Toth. With former teammate Greta Cicolari, she achieved a career-high world ranking of No. 4 in August 2012. Her career highlights include two gold, seven silver and seven bronze medals on the FIVB World Tour. She is also the 2011 European champion and the 2013 Mediterranean Games champion, both achieved with Cicolari. Menegatti represented Italy at the 2012 and 2016 Summer Olympics, finishing fifth (with Cicolari) and ninth (with Laura Giombini) respectively.

Born into a sporting family, Menegatti started playing indoor volleyball at the age of nine. Her transition to beach volleyball began six or seven years later and she made her international debut in 2006. A decorated junior player, she medalled at four age-group World and European Championships with different partners. Menegatti debuted on the World Tour with Cicolari in 2009. The pair entered the top ten of the world rankings by their third year and medalled at seven World Tour events before an acrimonious split midway through 2013. Menegatti then teamed up with Orsi Toth and reached the podium five more times over the next three years, including her first World Tour title in 2015. Following Orsi Toth's suspension right before the 2016 Olympics, Menegatti struggled with different partners. Orsi Toth's return in the summer of 2018 brought about a return to form, with Menegatti climbing from a low of No. 81 back into the top 25 of the world rankings.

Menegatti has been noted as a complete player who can impact games on defense. She is the 2011 FIVB Most Improved Player.

== Early life ==
Born in Rovigo, Menegatti grew up in Ariano nel Polesine and hails from a sporting family. Her father Maurizio was an amateur footballer, while her mother Cinzia was an indoor volleyball player in the Serie C, the fifth tier of the Italian volleyball league system. Her younger brother Pietro is a footballer who has played as a goalkeeper for various Serie C and D clubs. Her mother described her as a quiet and resolute child. After trying out various sports including synchronised swimming and dance, Menegatti began playing indoor volleyball at the age of nine. She first played for a youth team in Taglio di Po, then later for a team in Jolanda di Savoia where her mother coached. In 2004, prior to her 14th birthday, Menegatti successfully tried out for the indoor volleyball club ASD Teodora Ravenna. She thus moved to Ravenna and spent the next five years playing in the Serie B1 and B2, the third and fourth tier of the Italian volleyball league system respectively.

While in Ravenna, Menegatti's indoor club often trained on a local beach, prompting her foray into beach volleyball. She began playing beach volleyball in the summer of 2005 or 2006, but did not take to it at first, partly because of the difficulty of playing on sand. Menegatti took it as a personal challenge to get better on the beach; she said years later that the challenging aspect of beach volleyball was probably what won her over from indoor. Soon after getting into the sport, she competed in her first beach tournament at the Trophy of the Regions (Italian: Trofeo delle Regioni), a national youth competition organised by the Italian Volleyball Federation (FIPAV). She was selected to the junior national team after coming in second at the event. Menegatti continued to play both beach and indoor volleyball over the next few years, entering beach tournaments during the summer indoor off-seasons.

== Career ==
=== 2006–2008: Junior years ===
Menegatti made her international debut on the Challenger and Satellite circuit in August 2006, where she and her partner Debora Pini placed ninth at the $10K Eboli Satellite tournament. From 2006 to 2008, Menegatti was paired with various partners to represent Italy at the annual U20 European, U19 World and U21 World Championships. She won her first international medal in the age-group category when she and Gilda Lombardo were runners-up at the 2007 edition of the U19 World Championships.

=== 2009: Partnering with Cicolari, World Tour debut ===
In the summer of 2009, at the age of 19, Menegatti was offered a spot on the Italian beach volleyball national team. She quit indoor volleyball to focus solely on the beach game. National team coach Lissandro Carvalho introduced her to Greta Cicolari, and the two began competing together on the Challenger and Satellite circuit, winning one silver and three bronze medals in 2009. Menegatti and Cicolari debuted in their first FIVB World Tour event at the $190K Barcelona Open in September. They defeated Rebecca Moskowitz and Kristina May of Canada in three sets to qualify for the double-elimination main draw, eventually finishing 13th after losing to Shelda Bede and Ana Paula Connelly of Brazil in the third round of the losers bracket. One month later at the $190K Sanya Open, the pair came through the qualifiers and upset two of the top-three seeds on their way to the semifinals where they lost to Angie Akers and Tyra Turner of the United States. They became the first Italian women's team to advance to a semifinal on the World Tour since 2001, and the third overall in the tour's 18-year history. They concluded their first year as teammates ranked No. 43 in the world.

Menegatti also continued to represent her country in age-group events. In August, she played with Laura Giombini at the U23 European Championships where they finished 19th. Later in the month, Menegatti and her partner Debora Allegretti won the U20 European Championships; they went on to compete at the U21 World Championships in September, finishing 9th.

=== 2010: First World Tour podium ===
In May 2010, Menegatti and Cicolari competed in their first World Tour major event at the $300K Rome Grand Slam, where they were knocked out by eventual champions Jennifer Kessy and April Ross of the United States to tie for ninth. They did not manage better than ninth at the next four Grand Slams either. Towards the end of the season, Menegatti played with Valeria Rosso on the World Tour as Cicolari was recovering from a muscle strain. Menegatti and Rosso became the first Italian pair to reach a World Tour final at the $190K Phuket Open in November. Seeded 16th, they upset three of the top-ten seeds before falling to the fourth-seeded Nicole Branagh and Kerri Walsh Jennings of the United States in the gold-medal match. Despite Cicolari's absence, Menegatti and Cicolari ended the year with an improved world ranking of No. 23.

Menegatti attained two more podium finishes on the age-group circuit. She was the silver medalist at the U23 European Championships with Giombini in August, following a loss to the Czech team of Kristýna Kolocová and Markéta Sluková in the gold-medal match. The next month, Menegatti briefly teamed up with Viktoria Orsi Toth to claim another silver medal at the U21 World Championships, losing a tight three-setter to the American team of Tara Roenicke and Summer Ross in the finals.

=== 2011: European champions ===
"It is just unbelievable—that was a really great match we played, maybe the best we have ever played. Everything just fitted in our way to play. I don't realize it year [sic] that we have just beaten our idols. I think it is the most important victory of our career."

— Menegatti on beating May-Treanor and Walsh Jennings in the Gstaad Grand Slam.

Menegatti and Cicolari medalled on the World Tour three times in 2011. The first was a silver medal at the $190K Myslowice Open in May, where they reached the finals as the No. 14 seeds with upsets over three of the top-five seeds, before falling to the sixth-seeded Dutch team of Sanne Keizer and Marleen van Iersel. In July, they entered the $300K Gstaad Grand Slam as the No. 5 seeds. They advanced to the semifinals undefeated, including a 19–21, 21–19, 15–11 quarterfinals win over the USA's third-seeded Misty May-Treanor and Kerri Walsh Jennings. In the semifinals, they lost to the second-seeded Juliana Silva and Larissa França of Brazil, but came back the next day to beat another Brazilian team of Maria Elisa Antonelli and Talita Antunes to claim the bronze medal. Menegatti closed out the year by medalling at the $190K Phuket Open once again, this time with a third-place finish with Cicolari.

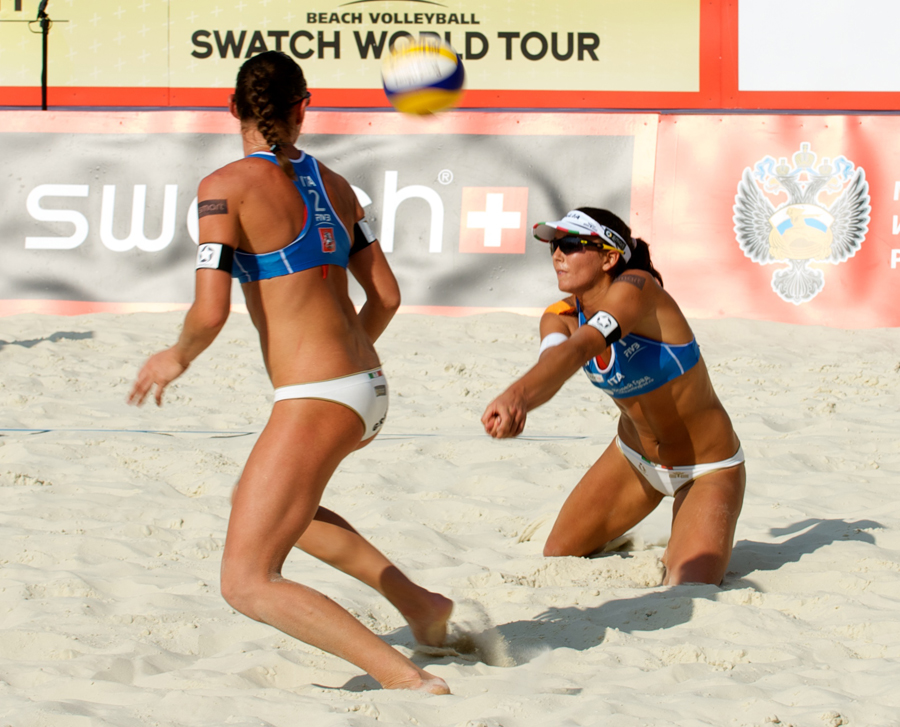
Menegatti (right) receives a serve at the 2011 Moscow Grand Slam as Cicloari watches

Menegatti and Cicolari entered their first World Championships in Rome as the No. 13 seeds. With a partisan crowd, they topped their group and won their first knockout match against Russia's Anastasia Vasina and Anna Vozakova. They were eliminated from the competition in the Round of 16 by China's Xue Chen and Zhang Xi in straight sets. They ended the year sixth in the world rankings, and Menegatti was named the FIVB Most Improved Player.

The pair competed at the European Championships for the first time in August. Coming in as the No. 2 seeds, they advanced to the final four without meeting any of the top-ten seeds. In their semifinal match against the Czech Republic's tenth-seeded Lenka Háječková and Hana Skalníková, they rallied from a first-set loss to win 19–21, 21–13, 15–13. They were crowned the new European champions with a dominating 21–10, 21–12 win over the 16th-seeded Barbara Hansel and Sara Montagnolli of Austria in the championship match.

=== 2012: London Olympics ===
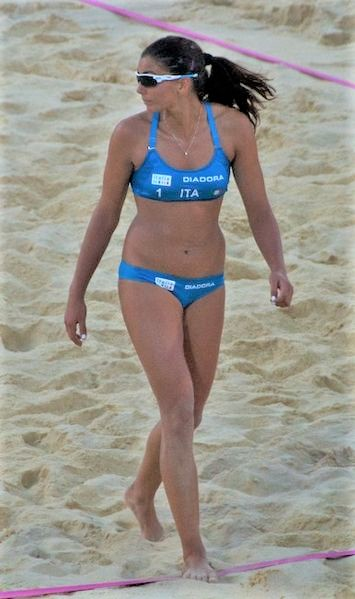
Menegatti in the quarterfinals at the 2012 Summer Olympics

In the lead up to the 2012 Summer Olympics, Menegatti and Cicolari competed in seven World Tour events. They medalled in three of them, starting off 2012 with a bronze at the $190K Brasília Open, followed by a silver at the $300K Beijing Grand Slam, and another bronze at the $300K Berlin Grand Slam. They notched victories against top teams including the Brazilian pairs of Juliana and Larissa, and Maria Antonelli and Talita, as well as the American pairs of May-Treanor and Walsh Jennings, and Kessy and April Ross. In order to avoid worsening a shoulder injury, Menegatti skipped the European Championships in May and was thus not able to defend her title.

Menegatti and Cicolari qualified for the London Olympics on 18 June 2012 via their Olympic ranking points. They were ranked No. 5 in the world at the time and were considered the tournament's dark horse due to their recent success on the World Tour. The duo went undefeated in the group stage. They rallied from a set down to win their first match against Russia's Ekaterina Birlova and Evgeniya Ukolova. This was followed by a 21–18, 21–12 victory over Zara Dampney and Shauna Mullin of Great Britain. Their final group stage match saw them beat Marie-Andrée Lessard and Annie Martin of Canada in three sets to top their group with a 6–2 set record. They won their first knockout match against Spain's Elsa Baquerizo and Liliana Fernandez to progress to the quarterfinals where they faced May-Treanor and Walsh Jennings. The Americans defeated them in straight sets, thus ending Menegatti and Cicolari's Olympic run. Menegatti was visibly upset during the quarterfinals match; she later explained that her tears were due to the frustration of losing, particularly to her hero May-Treanor.

A few days after the Olympics, they entered their last tournament of the year at the $300K Stare Jablonki Grand Slam; they came in second with a loss to Juliana and Larissa in the gold-medal match. After Stare Jablonki, Menegatti and Cicolari reached a career-high world ranking of No. 4.

=== 2013: Partnering with Orsi Toth ===
Menegatti and Cicolari represented Italy at the 2013 Mediterranean Games in June. They finished a dominant tournament run—in which they did not drop a set—with a 21–16, 21–13 victory over Vassiliki Arvaniti and Peny Karagkouni of Greece. The duo took part in the World Championships the following month, advancing to the quarterfinals where they were defeated by Brazil's Liliane Maestrini and Bárbara Seixas. On the World Tour, Menegatti and Cicolari competed in five events together in the first half of 2013; their best results were three fifth-place finishes. In what would be their last tournament together, they placed ninth at the $220K Gstaad Grand Slam in July. la Repubblica reported that the pair had gone to the Gstaad tournament without any of their coaching staff due to growing tensions between Cicolari and national team coach Carvalho.

After Gstaad, Carvalho decided to separate the pair, and Menegatti entered the $220K Long Beach Grand Slam one week later with Viktoria Orsi Toth, who she last played with at the 2010 U21 World Championships. Menegatti and Orsi Toth did not win any of their group stage matches and exited the Grand Slam tied for 25th. Menegatti released a statement shortly after to affirm her support for Carvalho's decision. The new pairing's results improved after Long Beach, with two fourth-place finishes at the $220K Moscow and São Paulo Grand Slams. Having only played five international events as a team, they finished their first season together ranked No. 44 in the world.

=== 2014–2015: First World Tour title ===
At the beginning of 2014, Carvalho abruptly left the national team programme and his coaching duties were handed over to Paulo "Paulao" Moreira Da Costa. Menegatti and Orsi Toth had a slow start to the season, failing to reach the podium in their first ten World Tour events. They were further setback and forced to skip a tournament when Orsi Toth sprained her ankle mid-season. The duo finally earned their first World Tour medal as a team—after 15 previous attempts—at the $400K São Paulo Grand Slam in September. Seeded 11th, they upset the second-seeded Walsh Jennings and April Ross of the United States in the quarterfinals, followed by the ninth-seeded Madelein Meppelink and Marleen van Iersel of the Netherlands in the semifinals. In the finals against Brazil's seventh-seeded Larissa and Talita, Menegatti and Orsi Toth were unable to capitalise on several match points, eventually losing with a score of 21–18, 21–23, 19–21. The pair also represented Italy at the European Championships, finishing fifth with a three-set loss to Meppelink and van Iersel in the quarterfinals. Overall, it was a season of "near-misses" which saw them lose a number of key tiebreaker sets. At the end of 2014, they were ranked tenth in the world.

Carvalho returned as their coach in early 2015, and Menegatti and Orsi Toth started off the year with a bronze medal at the $300K Moscow Grand Slam in May. However, Menegatti was troubled by injuries in the first half of the season, and they could not repeat the Moscow feat in their next eight tournaments, failing to advance to the knockout stage in three of them. An abdominal problem also sidelined Menegatti from the 2015 European Championships in July. Their results got better in September when they won their first World Tour title at the $75K Sochi Open, coming back from a five-point deficit in the first set to beat Isabelle Forrer and Anouk Vergé-Dépré of Switzerland in two sets. The gold medal in Sochi made them the first Italian women's team to ever win a World Tour event. Menegatti and Orsi Toth went on to medal at their next two tournaments, with a bronze at the $75K Puerto Vallarta Open and a silver at the $75K Antalya Open. They were the eighth-ranked team in the world at the end of 2015.

=== 2016: Rio Olympics ===
"I will never forget the feelings on that day—August 2. I felt lost, hopeless, it was like if I had been deprived of one half of myself. I still feel a deep anxiety thinking back to those moments, it was terrible."

— Menegatti on Orsi Toth's suspension in Rio.

Menegatti and Orsi Toth did not medal on the World Tour in 2016; their highest finish was a fourth at the $75K Sochi Open, as well as fifth-place finishes at three $400K Majors. They qualified for the 2016 Summer Olympics in Rio de Janeiro on 13 June 2016 via their Olympic ranking points. The pair were ranked No. 7 in the world at the time. On 2 August, three days before the start of the Olympics, Orsi Toth was found to have tested positive for the banned substance clostebol and was suspended from competition. (Note: The positive sample came from an out-of-competition doping test conducted by the Italian Anti-Doping Organization on 19 July 2016. A counter-analysis was performed the day after the initial announcement and confirmed the positive result.) Rebecca Perry, a professional indoor volleyball player who had transitioned to beach volleyball earlier that year, was initially selected by FIPAV as Orsi Toth's replacement. (Note: Another athlete was allowed to replace Orsi Toth as the FIVB considers beach volleyball to be a team sport, such that "[i]n team sports, the player gets punished, not the team." The replacement was authorised by the Rio 2016 Organising Committee under the "Late Athlete Replacement Policy", which allows for discretionary authorisation of athlete replacements by the Committee "on a case-by-case basis for exceptional circumstances.") However, Perry was found by the Fédération Internationale de Volleyball (FIVB) to be ineligible as she had not participated in sufficient qualifying tournaments. (Note: The FIVB Olympic qualification system required athletes to have participated in at least 12 tournaments before 10 July 2016; Perry did not play in her 12th tournament until two days after the deadline.) Instead, Laura Giombini, who Menegatti last played with at the 2010 U23 European Championships, was brought in as she was the only Italian athlete who met the FIVB's eligibility criteria. Giombini arrived in Rio three days before their first match was scheduled to take place.

As both Menegatti and Giombini specialised as right-side defenders at the time, they had to adapt positions: Giombini became the team's blocker, while Menegatti moved to the left side of the court. With only three practices together beforehand, commentators observed in their opening match against Canada that the two had difficulties coordinating on defense, resulting in positioning errors and confusion between the blocker and defender. Seeded ninth, they suffered three-set losses against the 16th-seeded Jamie Broder and Kristina May of Canada and the fourth-seeded Laura Ludwig and Kira Walkenhorst of Germany in the group stage, but were still able to advance to the knockout stage following a victory over Egypt's Doaa Elghobashy and Nada Meawad. A two-set loss to Walsh Jennings and April Ross in the next round saw them exit from the competition.

Despite Orsi Toth's suspension, her and Menegatti's top-eight world ranking qualified them for the World Tour Finals held in Toronto, Canada. With Giombini replacing Orsi Toth, Menegatti did not win any of her matches.

=== 2017–2018: Partner switches, struggles ===
At the end of 2016, Menegatti announced that Perry would be her new partner for the following season. The decision to team up with Perry, a 1.91 m (6 ft 3 in) blocker, was made to allow Menegatti to return to her preferred position as a right-side defender. However, Menegatti and Perry struggled on the World Tour and did not manage better than a 17th place in nine tournaments. Their results saw Menegatti drop in the world rankings and the tandem were ranked No. 39 by the end of September. During this time, both Perry and Menegatti's longtime coach Carvalho left the national team programme. Carvalho was replaced by his coaching assistant, Terenzio Feroleto, in 2018.

"I love this sport and it doesn't bother me if I have to restart and begin from the bottom. I want to gain the position I had before. I know I have to work and fight a lot. It will take me some time but I'm confident I can get there."

— Menegatti on her slump.

Menegatti reunited with Giombini for the first half of 2018, although the plan was for her to resume her partnership with Orsi Toth once the latter's doping ban expired midway through the season. No longer having sufficient ranking points to play in the major events, Menegatti and Giombini commenced 2018 competing at the $10K Shepparton Open. They came away with the bronze medal and amassed enough points to enter the qualifiers for the $300K Fort Lauderdale Major in February. The pair did not make it out of the qualifiers in Fort Lauderdale and in three of their next six World Tour events. They entered the European Championships as the No. 32 seeds and recorded a group stage upset over the top-seeded Chantal Laboureur and Julia Sude of Germany. However, they were beaten in the first knockout round by Switzerland's Zoe and Anouk Vergé-Dépré to finish 17th. The bronze in Shepparton was Menegatti's only medal in 19 international events playing with Giombini and Perry. Prior to Orsi Toth's return, Menegatti and Giombini were ranked No. 81 in the world.

=== 2018–present: Orsi Toth's return ===
Orsi Toth served a two-year suspension and returned to international competition in July at the $50K Agadir Open, resuming her partnership with Menegatti. The pair won the tournament as the No. 13 seeds. The following week, they were given a wild card into the main draw of the $300K Vienna Major as the 31st seeds. In the group stage, they upset the second-seeded Heather Bansley and Brandie Wilkerson of Canada, and the 15th-seeded Nina Betschart and Tanja Huberli of Switzerland to top their group. They advanced to the Round of 16 where they were knocked out of the tournament by Sara Hughes and Summer Ross of the United States. Orsi Toth's return produced a turnaround in results for Menegatti, with the duo posting top-ten finishes in all seven World Tour events they entered, including a second-place finish at the $75K Qinzhou Open in October. They concluded the year ranked No. 25 in the world.

== Style of play ==
Menegatti receives a serve and attacks from the right side of the court to score a point against Spain at the 2012 Summer Olympics. She has played on the right side for the majority of her career.

Menegatti is a defender and a right-handed left-side player. Originally a right-side specialist, she switched over to the left when she played with Giombini at the 2016 Summer Olympics, and continued playing on the left since reuniting with Giombini—and later Orsi Toth—in 2018. La Gazzetta dello Sport's Mario Salvini praised Menegatti as one of the best technical players in the world in 2015, while OA Sport's Enrico Spada described her as a complete player in his preview of the Rio Olympics. According to Spada, she is able to impact games on defense such that she often wins points on her team's serve. Of the 88 players who competed in a Major Series main draw on the 2015 World Tour, Menegatti had the third highest serve efficiency, winning points on her serve over 43% of the time despite just 6.4% of her serves being aces. She was similarly ranked within the top four for serve efficiency in 2016. Olympic gold medalist Dain Blanton commented at the 2018 Vienna Major that one of Menegatti's strengths is her ability to turn backcourt defense into offensive plays. Prior to her post-Rio Olympics slump, she was regarded as one of the most consistent players on the international circuit.

In her partnership with Orsi Toth, opponents almost always serve the latter as they fear Menegatti. Menegatti has assumed a leadership role within this pairing as she is the more experienced of the two—a role reversal of when she played with Cicolari. While she has worked on developing her leadership skills and says she enjoys taking on this role, Spada noted that there are times when she loses her edge and struggles to lead the team. Menegatti has described herself as a more "explosive" player compared to Orsi Toth's calmer demeanor.

== Personal life ==
Menegatti graduated from secondary school with a diploma in accounting, specialising in foreign languages. She went on to enroll in the Faculty of Motor Sciences at the University of L'Aquila. She has been a member of the Centro Sportivo Aeronautica Militare since December 2009, with the current rank of 1st Chosen Airman (Italian: Primo Aviere Scelto), and as such receives a monthly stipend from the Italian Air Force. As members of the Air Force, Menegatti and Cicolari participated in the 2011 Military World Games. Menegatti is sponsored by Mikasa Sports (sports equipment), Oakley, Inc. (eyewear) and Adidas (sportswear); previous sponsors include Red Bull (energy drink) and Smart (automotive). She has also been a brand ambassador for Shiseido (beauty products) and Unet Energia Italiana (renewable energy).

Since she was young, Menegatti respected Misty May-Treanor for both her playing style and her on-court demeanor. During matches, Menegatti wears a pair of pearl earrings that were a gift from her parents as a symbolic way of having them with her. She was in a relationship with fellow Italian beach volleyball player Alex Ranghieri.

=== Trial against Cicolari ===
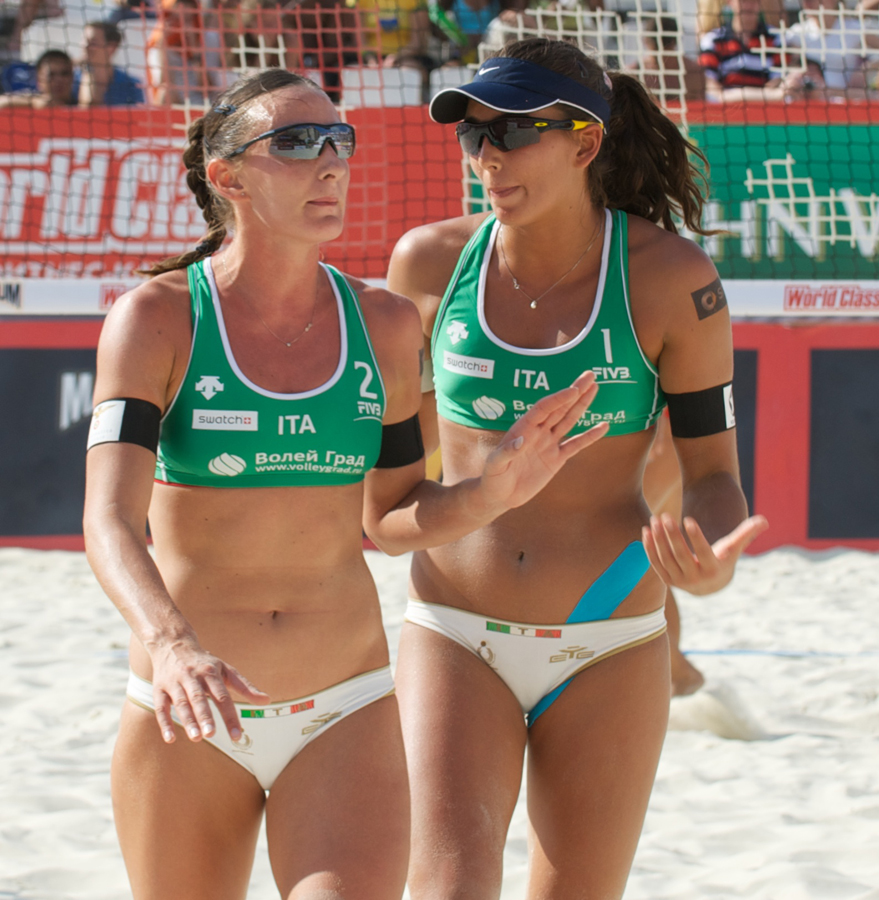
Cicolari (left) and Menegatti in 2011

Menegatti (together with her former coach Carvalho and another Italian beach volleyball player) submitted a series of complaints to the Public Prosecutor's Office of Bergamo in 2014, accusing Cicolari, and three other individuals associated with Cicolari, of stalking and harassment. According to the subsequent investigation, the accused parties had allegedly sent threats and insults via text and social media in the years following the acrimonious 2013 split between Menegatti and Cicolari. The case was brought to trial and, in November 2018, Menegatti testified in court that the alleged harassment was still ongoing and that she has had to see a psychologist to deal with the resulting anxiety. According to Menegatti, her corporate sponsors had also been sent emails that were "denigratory" towards her which caused her to lose a sponsor.

== Career statistics ==
=== World Tour finals: 9 (2–7) ===
Legend
$400,000 tournaments (0–1)
$300,000 tournaments (0–2)
$190,000 tournaments (0–2)
$75,000 tournaments (1–2)
$50,000 tournaments (1–0)

| Result | W–L | Date | Tournament | Tier | Partner | Opponents | Score |
|---|---|---|---|---|---|---|---|
| Loss | 0–1 | Nov 2010 | Phuket Open | $190K | Valeria Rosso | (United States) Nicole Branagh (United States) Kerri Walsh Jennings | 23–21, 14–21, 11–15 (1:03) |
| Loss | 0–2 | May 2011 | Myslowice Open | $190K | Greta Cicolari | (Netherlands) Sanne Keizer (Netherlands) Marleen van Iersel | 17–21, 18–21 (0:39) |
| Loss | 0–3 | May 2012 | Beijing Grand Slam | $300K | Greta Cicolari | (Brazil) Juliana Silva (Brazil) Larissa França | 13–21, 15–21 (0:33) |
| Loss | 0–4 | Aug 2012 | Stare Jablonki Grand Slam | $300K | Greta Cicolari | (Brazil) Juliana Silva (Brazil) Larissa França | 16–21, 20–22 (0:38) |
| Loss | 0–5 | Sep 2014 | São Paulo Grand Slam | $400K | Viktoria Orsi Toth | (Brazil) Larissa França (Brazil) Talita Antunes | 21–18, 21–23, 19–21 (0:55) |
| Win | 1–5 | Sep 2015 | Sochi Open | $75K | Viktoria Orsi Toth | (Switzerland) Isabelle Forrer (Switzerland) Anouk Vergé-Dépré | 21–19, 21–16 (0:41) |
| Loss | 1–6 | Oct 2015 | Antalya Open | $75K | Viktoria Orsi Toth | (Czech Republic) Markéta Sluková (Czech Republic) Barbora Hermannová | 15–21, 17–21 (0:40) |
| Win | 2–6 | July 2018 | Agadir, Morocco | $50K | Viktoria Orsi Toth | (Czech Republic) Martina Bonnerova (Czech Republic) Sarka Nakladalova | 19–21, 21–19, 15–12 (0:56) |
| Loss | 2–7 | Oct 2018 | Qinzhou, China | $75K | Viktoria Orsi Toth | (Brazil) Rebecca Cavalcanti (Brazil) Ana Patricia Silva | 21–18, 15–21, 12–15 (0:44) |

=== European finals: 1 (1–0) ===
| Result | W–L | Date | Tournament | Partner | Opponents | Score |
|---|---|---|---|---|---|---|
| Win | 1–0 | Aug 2011 | European Championships | Greta Cicolari | (Austria) Barbara Hansel (Austria) Sara Montagnolli | 21–10, 21–12 (0:31) |

=== Performance timeline ===
Key

| W | Won | F | Finalist | SF | Semi-finalist |
| QF | Quarter-finalist | #R | Rounds 4, 3, 2, 1 | RR | Round-robin stage |
| Q# | Qualification round | A | Absent | w/d | Withdrew |
| G | Gold | S | Silver | B | Bronze |
| NH | Not held | N/A | Not applicable | DNQ | Did not qualify |

Current through the 2018 FIVB World Tour Finals.

| Tournament | 2011 | 2012 | 2013 | 2014 | 2015 | 2016 | 2017 | 2018 | SR | W–L | Win % |
|---|---|---|---|---|---|---|---|---|---|---|---|
| Summer Olympics | NH | QF (4–1) | NH | NH | NH | 1R (1–3) | NH | NH | 0 / 2 | 5–4 | 56% |
| World Championships | 2R (4–1) | NH | QF (4–2) | NH | 2R (4–1) | NH | RR (0–3) | NH | 0 / 4 | 12–7 | 63% |
| World Tour Finals | NH | NH | NH | NH | A | RR (0–3) | A | A | 0 / 1 | 0–3 | 0% |
| European Championships | W (7–0) | A | A | QF (4–2) | A | 1R (3–1) | A | 1R (2–2) | 1 / 4 | 16–5 | 76% |
Career statistics
| Titles / Finals | 1 / 1 | 0 / 0 | 0 / 0 | 0 / 0 | 0 / 0 | 0 / 0 | 0 / 0 | 0 / 0 | 1 / 1 | | |
| Overall win–loss | 11–1 | 4–1 | 4–2 | 4–2 | 4–1 | 4–7 | 0–3 | 2–2 | 33–19 | | |
| Year-end ranking | 6 | 5 | 44 | 10 | 8 | 10 | 42 | 25 | 63% | | |

== Notes ==
Awards
| Preceded by Taiana Lima (BRA) | Women's FIVB World Tour "Most Improved"; 2011 | Succeeded by Sophie van Gestel (NED) |
