= Lidianny Echevarría =

Cuban volleyball player (born 1996)

Lidianny Echevarria
Personal information
- Full name: Lidiannis Echevarría Benítez
- Born: 19 March 1996 (age 29) Artemisa, Cuba

Sport
- Sport: Beach volleyball

Lidiannis Echevarría Benítez (Note: In this Spanish name, the first or paternal surname is Echevarría and the second or maternal family name is Benítez.) (born 19 March 1996) is a Cuban volleyball player.

Echevarria was selected to play at the 2020 Olympic Games in Tokyo alongside Leila Martínez. The duo won two rounds 2-0.
