= Greta Cicolari =

Italian beach volleyball player

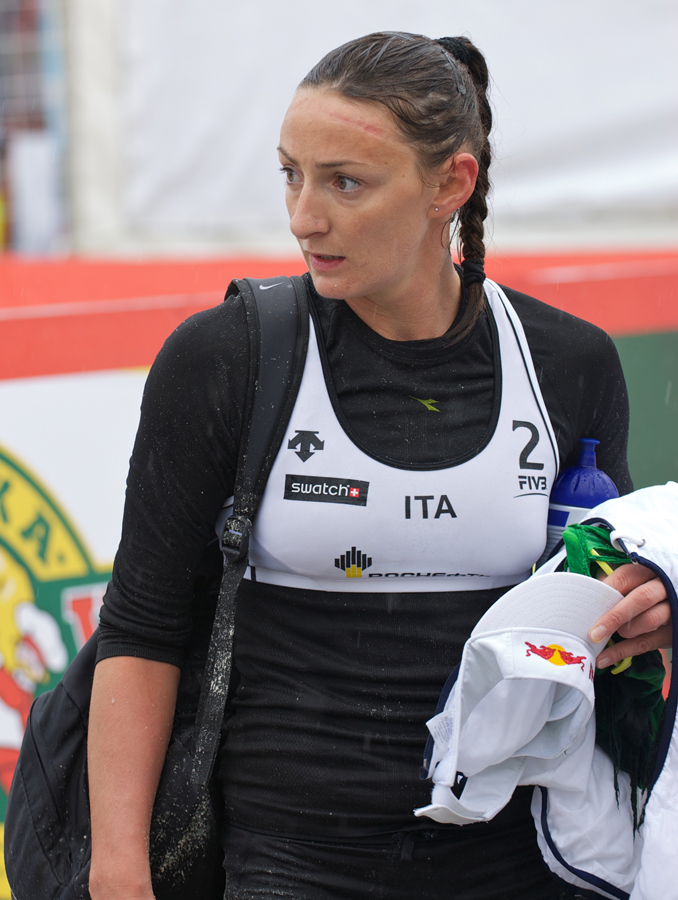
- Cicolari in 2012

Personal information
- Nationality: Italian
- Born: 23 August 1982 (age 44) Bergamo, Italy
- Height: 180 cm (5 ft 11 in)
- Weight: 65 kg (143 lb)

Sport
- Country: Italy
- Sport: Beach volleyball
Medal record
Women's beach volleyball
Representing Italy
European Championships
Gold medal – first place	2011 Kristiansand	Beach
Mediterranean Games
Gold medal – first place	2013 Mersin	Beach
Silver medal – second place	2009 Pescara	Beach

Greta Cicolari (born 23 August 1982) is an Italian beach volleyball player. As of 2012, she plays with Marta Menegatti. They qualified for the 2012 Summer Olympics in London and reached the quarter-finals.
