= Pietro Menegatti =

Italian footballer

Personal information
- Date of birth: 17 January 1992 (age 34)
- Place of birth: Rovigo, Italy
- Height: 1.85 m (6 ft 1 in)
- Position: Goalkeeper

Youth career
- –2009: Ravenna

Senior career*
Years	Team	Apps	(Gls)
2008–2012	Ravenna	36	(0)
2010–2011	→ Venezia (loan)	16	(0)
2012–2013	Poggibonsi	28	(0)
2013–2015	SPAL	71	(0)
2015–2016	Cesena	0	(0)
2016–2018	Fano	27	(0)
2018	Monopoli	4	(0)
2018–2019	Montegiorgio	22	(0)
2019–2021	Monopoli	21	(0)
- * Club domestic league appearances and goals as of 2 May 2021

Pietro Menegatti (born 17 January 1992) is an Italian footballer who plays as a goalkeeper.

== Club career ==
Menegatti made his debut in the Lega Pro Seconda Divisione for Poggibonsi on 1 December 2012 in a game against Salernitana. His first game in the unified Serie C for SPAL took place on 1 September 2014 against Pontedera. In December 2018 he joined Serie D club Montegiorgio.

On 16 July 2019, he returned to Monopoli on a 2-year contract.

== Personal life ==
Menegatti is the younger brother of beach volleyball player Marta Menegatti.
