= Beach Volleyball Major Series =

International series of beach volleyball tournaments

- Full name: Beach Volleyball Major Series
- Region: International
- Date span: February–September
- Tournaments: Men & Women
- Type: Beach volleyball
- CEO: Hannes Jagerhofer

History
- First tour: 2015
- Number of tour stops: 4 (2015), 5 (2016), 4 (2017), 4 (2018), 2 (2019)

Most tournament wins
- Women (team): (Brazil) Talita/Larissa (5 wins)
- Men (team): (Norway) Mol/Sørum (5 wins)

Present World Tour Final winners
- Women: (Germany) Ludwig/Kozuch
- Men: (Russia) Krasilnikov/Stoyanovskiy

The Beach Volleyball Major Series (or Beach Major Series and formerly the Swatch Beach Volleyball Major Series) was an international series of beach volleyball tournaments from 2015 to 2020. The tournaments consisted of Tour Stops and formed part of the FIVB Beach Volleyball World Tour. The series concluded with the FIVB World Tour Finals.

Each tournament in the series had a prize pool of US$300,000 per gender, except for the World Tour Finals which had a prize pool of US$400,000 per gender.

== History ==
The Beach Volleyball Major Series arose out of a joint-venture between Austrian companies Red Bull and the ACTS Group.

Red Bull was established in 1987 by Dietrich Mateschitz. Aside from the energy drink, Red Bull's direct marketing focuses heavily on sports and lifestyle.

ACTS Group is a marketing agency founded in 1990 by Hannes Jagerhofer. It offers services including event-marketing, event-organization, external-communication and public relations. The group has also been responsible for the organizing beach volleyball tournaments, including the FIVB Grand Slams in Klagenfurt, Carinthia, Austria.

Swatch was the title sponsor of the Swatch Beach Volleyball Major Series between 2015 and 2017.

The Series will not continue because of the COVID-19 pandemic.

== Relation to the FIVB ==
The competition was overseen by the FIVB, the international governing body for the sports of indoor, beach and grass volleyball.

In the category of Beach Volleyball, the FIVB oversees three competitions, namely: the FIVB Beach Volleyball Continental Cup, the FIVB Beach Volleyball World Tour and lastly the FIVB Beach Volleyball World Championships.

The Beach Volleyball Major Series formed part of the FIVB Beach Volleyball World Tour.

== Olympic qualification ==
Beach volleyball was formally recognized as an Olympic discipline in 1996. In order for a beach volleyball athlete to participate in the Olympics, minimum requirements must be met and one of these requirements as stipulated by the FIVB is that all athletes must have participated in a minimum of 12 official FIVB Olympic qualification tournaments as an individual.

Also an athlete hoping to participate in the Olympics must earn FIVB World Ranking points which tallies up to make up the Olympic Ranking.

Participation in Major Series tournaments counts towards Olympic qualification tournaments and also earns athletes FIVB World Ranking points. An exception is the FIVB World Tour Finals – participating teams do not earn FIVB World Ranking points for this event.

In 2016, the smart Major Hamburg was the final tournament where Olympic ranking points for the 2016 Olympic Games in Rio de Janeiro could be obtained.

== Tournaments ==
=== 2015 ===
The first Beach Volleyball Major Series began in 2015. There were Tour Stops in Poreč, Croatia; Stavanger, Norway and Gstaad, Switzerland. The Swatch Beach Volleyball FIVB World Tour Finals took place in Fort Lauderdale Florida, United States.

Dates	Tour Stop	Major	Host country	Men's winners	Women's winners
2–7 June	Poreč	Poreč Major	Croatia	Brouwer/Meewusen (Netherlands)	Larissa/Talita (Brazil)
9–12 June	Stavanger	Stavanger Major	Norway	Evandro/Pedro Solberg (Brazil)	Juliana/Antonelli (Brazil)
7–12 July	Gstaad	Gstaad Major	Switzerland	Alison/Bruno Schmidt (Brazil)	Larissa/Talita (Brazil)
29 September – 4 October	Fort Lauderdale	Swatch Beach Volleyball FIVB World Tour Finals	United States	Alison/Bruno Schmidt (Brazil)	Larissa/Talita (Brazil)

=== 2016 ===
The 2016 Major Series schedule began in Hamburg, Germany, and took in further stops in Croatia, Switzerland and Klagenfurt in Austria. The Series culminated with the Swatch Beach Volleyball FIVB World Tour Finals in Toronto.

Dates	Tour Stop	Major	Host country	Men's winners	Women's winners
7–12 June	Hamburg	smart Major Hamburg	Germany	Lucena/Dalhausser (United States)	Ludwig/Walkenhorst (Germany)
28 June – 3 July	Poreč	Poreč Major	Croatia	Alison/Bruno Schmidt (Brazil)	Laboureur/Sude (Germany)
5–10 July	Gstaad	Gstaad Major	Switzerland	Evandro/Pedro Solberg (Brazil)	Larissa/Talita (Brazil)
26–31 July	Klagenfurt	A1 Major Klagenfurt/Kärnten	Austria	Samoilovs/Smedins (Latvia)	Ludwig/Walkenhorst (Germany)
13–18 September	Toronto	Swatch Beach Volleyball FIVB World Tour Finals	Canada	Alison/Bruno Schmidt (Brazil)	Ludwig/Walkenhorst (Germany)

=== 2017 ===
The 2017 Major Series schedule was released in October 2016. As part of the FIVB World Tour, the Swatch Major Series did include trips to Poreč and Gstaad. The 2017 tour began in February in Fort Lauderdale, the site of the 2015 World Tour Finals. The 2017 Finals were held in August in Hamburg. The Swatch Major Series was also responsible for the organization of the FIVB Beach Volleyball World Championships in Vienna in July and August.

Dates	Tour Stop	Major	Host country	Men's winners	Women's winners
7–12 February	Fort Lauderdale	Fort Lauderdale Major	United States	Alvaro/Saymon (Brazil)	Larissa/Talita (Brazil)
27 Jun – 2 July	Poreč	Poreč Major	Croatia	Guto/Pedro Solberg (Brazil)	Pavan/Humana-Paredes (Canada)
4–9 July	Gstaad	Gstaad Major	Switzerland	Lucena/Dalhausser (United States)	Laboureur/Sude (Germany)
22–27 August	Hamburg	Swatch Beach Volleyball FIVB World Tour Finals	Germany	Lucena/Dalhausser (United States)	Ludwig/Walkenhorst (Germany)

=== 2018 ===
Dates	Tour Stop	Major	Host country	Men's winners	Women's winners
27 February – 4 April	Fort Lauderdale	Fort Lauderdale Major	United States	Lucena/Dalhausser (United States)	Seixas/Alves (Brazil)
5–10 July	Gstaad	Gstaad Major	Switzerland	Mol/Sørum (Norway)	Humana-Paredes/Pavan (Canada)
31 July – 5 August	Vienna	Vienna Major	Austria	Mol/Sørum (Norway)	Hermannová/Sluková (Czech Republic)
14–19 August	Hamburg	FIVB World Tour Finals	Germany	Mol/Sørum (Norway)	Agatha/Duda (Brazil)

=== 2019 ===
Dates	Tour Stop	Major	Host country	Men's winners	Women's winners
9–14 July	Gstaad	Gstaad Major	Switzerland	Mol/Sørum (Norway)	Klineman/Ross (United States)
31 July – 4 August	Vienna	Vienna Major	Austria	Mol/Sørum (Norway)	Pavan/Melissa (Canada)

=== 2020 ===
Due to the COVID-19 pandemic, all three tournaments as well as the whole Beach Volleyball Major Series was cancelled.

Dates	Tour Stop	Major	Host country	Men's winners	Women's winners
7–12 July	Gstaad	Gstaad Major	Switzerland	Cancelled	Cancelled
12–16 August	Vienna	Vienna Major	Austria	Cancelled	Cancelled
19–23 August	Hamburg	Hamburg Major	Germany	Cancelled	Cancelled

== Mascot ==
The Major Series' official mascot was Marnin. Unveiled prior to the 2016 season, Marnin is described as a cross between a kangaroo and a fox. Marnin made his debut courtside on the FIVB Tour at the Hamburg Major.

== See also ==
- Hannes Jagerhofer
- Red Bull
- FIVB
- Beach volleyball
