= Italian Anti-Doping Organization =

The Italian Anti-Doping Organization (Italian: Organizzazione Nazionale Anti Doping, NADO Italia) is an independent public authority charged with ensuring that participants in sports in Italy do not violate rules regarding doping.
