= European U20 Beach Volleyball Championships =

International beach volleyball competition

European U20 Beach Volleyball Championships is a double-gender beach volleyball tournament for national U20 teams. It is organised annually by the European Volleyball Confederation (CEV).

== Editions ==
U20 European Championships

U19

1. 1999, Aug 18–21 Finestrat ESP

U20

2. 2000, Aug 03-06 Nürnberg GER

2001 cancelled

3. 2002, Aug 22–25 Basel SUI

4. 2003, Jul 01-04 Salzburg AUT

5. 2004, Jul 22–25 Koper SLO

6. 2005, Jul 28–31 Tel Aviv ISR

7. 2006, Aug 17–20 Ankaran SLO

8. 2007, Aug 30 – Sep 02 Scheveningen NED

9. 2008, Aug 04-07 San Salvo ITA

10. 2009, Aug 26–29 Kos GRE

11. 2010, Jul 08-11 Catania ITA

12. 2011, Jul 27–30 Tel Aviv ISR

13. 2012, Aug 16–19 Hartberg AUT

14. 2013, Aug 08-11 Vilnius LTU

15. 2014, Sep 04-07 Cesenatico ITA

16. 2015, Sep 02-05 Larnaca CYP

17. 2016, Jun 16–19 Antalya TUR

18. 2017, Sep 07-10 Vulcano ITA

19. 2018, Jun 28 – Jul 01 Anapa RUS

20. 2019, Jun 27–30 Göteborg SWE

21. 2020, Sep 09-13 Brno CZE

22. 2021, Jul 08-11 İzmir TUR

23. 2022, Jul 14–17 İzmir TUR

24. 2023, Aug 17–20 Rīga LAT

25. 2024, Jul 24–28 Mysłowice POL

26. 2025, Aug 21–24 Madrid ESP

2020: Originally planned on Aug 12–16 but postponed due to the COVID-19 pandemic.

== Results ==
Men

Champions Final Runners-up Third place

1. 1999 RUS 2:1 GER GER
2. 2000 GER 2:0 NED GER
3. 2002 CZE 2:1 GER GER
4. 2003 LAT 2:0 ESP POL
5. 2004 LAT 2:0 GER POL
6. 2005 LAT 2:0 POL GER
7. 2006 GER 2:1 POL NED
8. 2007 POL 2:0 FRA ITA
9. 2008 POL 2:1 NED RUS
10. 2009 POL 2:1 UKR ESP
11. 2010 POL 2:1 DEN UKR
12. 2011 POL 2:0 LAT GER
13. 2012 AUT 2:1 POL POL
14. 2013 POL 2:1 POL RUS
15. 2014 GER 2:0 RUS LTU
16. 2015 NOR 2:0 FRA UKR
17. 2016 NOR 2:0 RUS SUI
18. 2017 RUS 2:0 SUI FRA
19. 2018 RUS 2:0 FRA RUS
20. 2019 NED 2:0 GER SWE
21. 2020 SWE 2:0 GER ITA
22. 2021 SLO 2:0 NOR ITA
23. 2022 AUT 2:1 FRA GER
24. 2023 FRA 2:0 AUT LAT
25. 2024 HUN 2:0 GRE SUI
26. 2025 DEN 2:1 FIN HUN

Women

Champions Final Runners-up Third place

1. 1999 GRE 2:0 LAT FRA
2. 2000 RUS 2:0 SUI EST
3. 2002 FIN 2:0 GER RUS
4. 2003 GER 2:0 RUS GER
5. 2004 GER 2:1 AUT GER
6. 2005 NED 2:1 AUT GER
7. 2006 GER 2:0 SUI NED
8. 2007 NED 2:0 CZE POL
9. 2008 RUS 2:0 POL NED
10. 2009 ITA 2:1 POL POL
11. 2010 GER 2:0 RUS POL
12. 2011 AUT 2:0 RUS POL
13. 2012 POL 2:0 GER LTU
14. 2013 SUI 2:0 POL AUT
15. 2014 SUI 2:0 AUT POL
16. 2015 NED 2:1 FIN RUS
17. 2016 NED 2:0 ITA BLR
18. 2017 RUS 2:1 ITA NED
19. 2018 RUS 2:0 POL SUI
20. 2019 RUS 2:0 NED ESP
21. 2020 LAT 2:0 SUI UKR
22. 2021 RUS 2:0 ESP DEN
23. 2022 UKR 2:0 LAT NED
24. 2023 POL 2:1 SUI CZE
25. 2024 SUI 2:0 LAT ESP
26. 2025 POL 2:0 FRA AUT

== Medals ==
=== Men (1999–2025) ===
Rank	Nation	Gold	Silver	Bronze	Total
1	Poland	6	4	3	13
2	Germany	3	5	6	14
3	Russia	3	2	3	8
4	Latvia	3	1	1	5
5	Austria	2	1	0	3
5	Norway	2	1	0	3
7	France	1	4	1	6
8	Netherlands	1	2	1	4
9	Denmark	1	1	0	2
10	Hungary	1	0	1	2
10	Sweden	1	0	1	2
12	Czech Republic	1	0	0	1
12	Slovenia	1	0	0	1
14	Switzerland	0	1	2	3
14	Ukraine	0	1	2	3
16	Spain	0	1	1	2
17	Finland	0	1	0	1
17	Greece	0	1	0	1
19	Italy	0	0	3	3
20	Lithuania	0	0	1	1
Totals (20 entries)		26	26	26	78

=== Women (1999–2025) ===
Rank	Nation	Gold	Silver	Bronze	Total
1	Russia	6	3	2	11
2	Germany	4	2	3	9
3	Netherlands	4	1	4	9
4	Poland	3	4	5	12
5	Switzerland	3	4	1	8
6	Austria	1	3	2	6
7	Latvia	1	3	0	4
8	Italy	1	2	0	3
9	Finland	1	1	0	2
10	Ukraine	1	0	1	2
11	Greece	1	0	0	1
12	Spain	0	1	2	3
13	Czech Republic	0	1	1	2
13	France	0	1	1	2
15	Belarus	0	0	1	1
15	Denmark	0	0	1	1
15	Estonia	0	0	1	1
15	Lithuania	0	0	1	1
Totals (18 entries)		26	26	26	78

==== Total (1999–2025) ====
Rank	Nation	Gold	Silver	Bronze	Total
1	Poland	9	8	8	25
2	Russia	9	5	5	19
3	Germany	7	7	9	23
4	Netherlands	5	3	5	13
5	Latvia	4	4	1	9
6	Switzerland	3	5	3	11
7	Austria	3	4	2	9
8	Norway	2	1	0	3
9	France	1	5	2	8
10	Italy	1	2	3	6
11	Finland	1	2	0	3
12	Ukraine	1	1	3	5
13	Czech Republic	1	1	1	3
13	Denmark	1	1	1	3
15	Greece	1	1	0	2
16	Hungary	1	0	1	2
16	Sweden	1	0	1	2
18	Slovenia	1	0	0	1
19	Spain	0	2	3	5
20	Lithuania	0	0	2	2
21	Belarus	0	0	1	1
21	Estonia	0	0	1	1
Totals (22 entries)		52	52	52	156
