= Laura Giombini =

Italian beach volleyball player (born 1989)

Personal information
- Nationality: Italian
- Born: 4 January 1989 (age 36); Perugia, Italy
- Height: 183 cm (6 ft 0 in)
- Weight: 70 kg (154 lb)

Sport
- Country: Italy
- Sport: Beach volleyball
- Event: Rio 2016 Olympics

Laura Giombini (born 4 January 1989) is an Italian beach volleyball player. She represented her country at the 2016 Summer Olympics in Rio de Janeiro.

Three days before the opening ceremony the Italian Volleyball Federation partnered Laura with Marta Menegatti.
