= Beach volleyball at the 2020 Summer Olympics – Men's tournament =

Men's beach volleyball at the Games of the XXXII Olympiad
- Venue: Shiokaze Park
- Dates: 24 July – 7 August 2021
- Competitors: 48 from 19 nations
- Teams: 24

Medalists
1st place, gold medalist(s)		Anders Mol; Christian Sørum	Norway
2nd place, silver medalist(s)		Viacheslav Krasilnikov; Oleg Stoyanovskiy	ROC
3rd place, bronze medalist(s)		Cherif Younousse; Ahmed Tijan	Qatar

The men's beach volleyball tournament at the 2020 Olympic Games in Tokyo, Japan, took place at the Shiokaze Park. The competition was held from 24 July to 7 August 2021. It was originally scheduled to take place from 25 July to 8 August 2020, but due to the COVID-19 pandemic, the IOC and the Tokyo 2020 Organising Committee announced on 24 March 2020 that the 2020 Summer Olympics would be delayed to 2021. Because of this pandemic, the games were played behind closed doors. Twenty four teams with 48 athletes around the world competed for the gold medal.

Anders Mol and Christian Sørum captured the gold medal after defeating Viacheslav Krasilnikov and Oleg Stoyanovskiy in the final, while Cherif Younousse and Ahmed Tijan took home bronze.

The medals for the competition were presented by Kristin Kloster Aasen, Norway; IOC Member, and the medalists' bouquets were presented by Ary Graça, Brazil; FIVB President.

== Qualification ==
Means of qualification	Date	Venue	Vacancies	Qualified
Host nation	—N/a	—N/a	1	Japan
2019 World Championships	28 June – 7 July 2019	(Germany) Hamburg	1	ROC
2019 FIVB Olympic Qualification Tournament	18–22 September 2019	(China) Haiyang	2	Italy
2019 FIVB Olympic Qualification Tournament	18–22 September 2019	(China) Haiyang	2	Latvia
FIVB Beach Volleyball Olympic Ranking	13 June 2021	(Switzerland) Lausanne	15	Norway
FIVB Beach Volleyball Olympic Ranking	13 June 2021	(Switzerland) Lausanne	15	Qatar
FIVB Beach Volleyball Olympic Ranking	13 June 2021	(Switzerland) Lausanne	15	Brazil
FIVB Beach Volleyball Olympic Ranking	13 June 2021	(Switzerland) Lausanne	15	Poland
FIVB Beach Volleyball Olympic Ranking	13 June 2021	(Switzerland) Lausanne	15	Netherlands
FIVB Beach Volleyball Olympic Ranking	13 June 2021	(Switzerland) Lausanne	15	Brazil
FIVB Beach Volleyball Olympic Ranking	13 June 2021	(Switzerland) Lausanne	15	Germany
FIVB Beach Volleyball Olympic Ranking	13 June 2021	(Switzerland) Lausanne	15	ROC
FIVB Beach Volleyball Olympic Ranking	13 June 2021	(Switzerland) Lausanne	15	Czech Republic
FIVB Beach Volleyball Olympic Ranking	13 June 2021	(Switzerland) Lausanne	15	United States
FIVB Beach Volleyball Olympic Ranking	13 June 2021	(Switzerland) Lausanne	15	United States
FIVB Beach Volleyball Olympic Ranking	13 June 2021	(Switzerland) Lausanne	15	Spain
FIVB Beach Volleyball Olympic Ranking	13 June 2021	(Switzerland) Lausanne	15	Poland
FIVB Beach Volleyball Olympic Ranking	13 June 2021	(Switzerland) Lausanne	15	Italy
FIVB Beach Volleyball Olympic Ranking	13 June 2021	(Switzerland) Lausanne	15	Chile
2018–2020 CEV Continental Cup Final	23–26 June 2021	(Netherlands) The Hague	1	Switzerland
2018–2020 AVC Continental Cup Final	25–27 June 2021	(Thailand) Nakhon Pathom	1	Australia
2018–2020 CAVB Continental Cup Final	25–27 June 2021	(Morocco) Agadir	1	Morocco
2018–2020 NORCECA Continental Cup Final	25–27 June 2021	(Mexico) Colima	1	Mexico
2018–2020 CSV Continental Cup Final	26–27 June 2021	(Chile) Santiago	1	Argentina
Total			24	

== Teams ==
Twenty four teams were drawn in six pools of four teams.

Team	NOC
Julian Azaad / Nicolás Capogrosso	Argentina
Chris McHugh / Damien Schumann	Australia
Alison Cerutti / Álvaro Morais Filho	Brazil
Evandro Oliveira / Bruno Oscar Schmidt	Brazil
Marco Grimalt / Esteban Grimalt	Chile
Ondřej Perušič / David Schweiner	Czech Republic
Julius Thole / Clemens Wickler	Germany
Adrian Carambula / Enrico Rossi	Italy
Paolo Nicolai / Daniele Lupo	Italy
Yusuke Ishijima / Katsuhiro Shiratori	Japan
Mārtiņš Pļaviņš / Edgars Točs	Latvia
Josué Gaxiola / José Rubio	Mexico
Zouheir El Graoui / Mohamed Abicha	Morocco
Alexander Brouwer / Robert Meeuwsen	Netherlands
Anders Mol / Christian Sørum	Norway
Michał Bryl / Grzegorz Fijałek	Poland
Piotr Kantor / Bartosz Łosiak	Poland
Cherif Younousse / Ahmed Tijan	Qatar
Viacheslav Krasilnikov / Oleg Stoyanovskiy	ROC
Konstantin Semenov / Ilya Leshukov	ROC
Pablo Herrera / Adrián Gavira	Spain
Adrian Heidrich / Mirco Gerson	Switzerland
Jake Gibb / Tri Bourne*	United States
Nick Lucena / Phil Dalhausser	United States

*Taylor Crabb of the United States originally qualified to play with Gibb, but was tested positive for COVID-19 and was replaced by Bourne.

== Draw ==
The draw was made on 5 July 2021.

Pool A	Pool B	Pool C
Mol – Sørum (NOR)	Krasilnikov – Stoyanovskiy (ROC)	Cherif – Ahmed (QAT)
Semenov – Leshukov (ROC)	Perušič – Schweiner (CZE)	Gibb – Bourne (USA)
Herrera – Gavira (ESP)	Pļaviņš – Točs (LAT)	Carambula – Rossi (ITA)
McHugh – Schumann (AUS)	Gaxiola – Rubio (MEX)	Heidrich – Gerson (SUI)

Pool D	Pool E	Pool F
Alison – Álvaro (BRA)	Fijałek – Bryl (POL)	Ishijima – Shiratori (JPN)
Brouwer – Meeuwsen (NED)	Evandro – Schmidt (BRA)	Thole – Wickler (GER)
Lucena – Dalhausser (USA)	M Grimalt – E Grimalt (CHI)	Nicolai – Lupo (ITA)
Azaad – Capogrosso (ARG)	El Graoui – Abicha (MAR)	Kantor – Łosiak (POL)

== Referees ==
The following referees were selected for the tournament.

- (Argentina) Osvaldo Sumavil
- (Brazil) Mário Ferro
- (China) Wang Lijun
- (Colombia) Juan Carlos Saavedra
- (Greece) Charalampos Papadogoulas
- (Japan) Mariko Satomi
- (Italy) Davide Crescentini
- (Poland) Agnieszka Myszkowska
- (Portugal) Rui Carvalho
- (Russia) Roman Pristovakin
- (South Africa) Giovanni Bake
- (Spain) José María Padrón
- (United States) Brig Beatie

== Preliminary round ==
All times are local (UTC+9).

=== Pool A ===
Pos	Team	Pld	W	L	Pts	SW	SL	SR	SPW	SPL	SPR	Qualification
1	Semenov – Leshukov (ROC)	3	3	0	6	6	0	MAX	127	107	1.187	Round of 16
2	Mol – Sørum (NOR)	3	2	1	5	4	3	1.333	137	133	1.030	Round of 16
3	Herrera – Gavira (ESP)	3	1	2	4	2	4	0.500	120	120	1.000	Lucky losers
4	McHugh – Schumann (AUS)	3	0	3	3	1	6	0.167	114	138	0.826	

Source: Tokyo 2020 and FIVB

24 July 2021; 16:00	Semenov – Leshukov	2–0	(Spain) Herrera – Gavira	Shiokaze Park, Tokyo; Referees: Mário Ferro (BRA), Osvaldo Sumavil (ARG)
24 July 2021; 16:00	(21–19, 22–20); Report			Shiokaze Park, Tokyo; Referees: Mário Ferro (BRA), Osvaldo Sumavil (ARG)

24 July 2021; 22:00	Mol – Sørum (Norway)	2–1	(Australia) McHugh – Schumann	Shiokaze Park, Tokyo; Referees: Agnieszka Myszkowska (POL), Juan Carlos Saavedra (COL)
24 July 2021; 22:00	(21–18, 18–21, 15–13); Report			Shiokaze Park, Tokyo; Referees: Agnieszka Myszkowska (POL), Juan Carlos Saavedra (COL)

26 July 2021; 15:00	Semenov – Leshukov	2–0	(Australia) McHugh – Schumann	Shiokaze Park, Tokyo; Referees: Wang Lijun (CHN), Davide Crescentini (ITA)
26 July 2021; 15:00	(21–14, 21–16); Report			Shiokaze Park, Tokyo; Referees: Wang Lijun (CHN), Davide Crescentini (ITA)

26 July 2021; 22:00	Mol – Sørum (Norway)	2–0	(Spain) Herrera – Gavira	Shiokaze Park, Tokyo; Referees: Charalampos Papadogoulas (GRE), Giovanni Bake (RSA)
26 July 2021; 22:00	(21–17, 24–22); Report			Shiokaze Park, Tokyo; Referees: Charalampos Papadogoulas (GRE), Giovanni Bake (RSA)

28 July 2021; 17:00	Herrera – Gavira (Spain)	2–0	(Australia) McHugh – Schumann	Shiokaze Park, Tokyo; Referees: Roman Pristovakin (RUS), Mário Ferro (BRA)
28 July 2021; 17:00	(21–16, 21–16); Report			Shiokaze Park, Tokyo; Referees: Roman Pristovakin (RUS), Mário Ferro (BRA)

28 July 2021; 22:00	Mol – Sørum (Norway)	0–2	Semenov – Leshukov	Shiokaze Park, Tokyo; Referees: Brig Beatie (USA), José María Padrón (ESP)
28 July 2021; 22:00	(19–21, 19–21); Report			Shiokaze Park, Tokyo; Referees: Brig Beatie (USA), José María Padrón (ESP)

=== Pool B ===
Pos	Team	Pld	W	L	Pts	SW	SL	SR	SPW	SPL	SPR	Qualification
1	Krasilnikov – Stoyanovskiy (ROC)	3	2	1	5	5	4	1.250	169	148	1.142	Round of 16
2	Pļaviņš – Točs (LAT)	3	2	1	5	4	3	1.333	83	93	0.892	Round of 16
3	Gaxiola – Rubio (MEX)	3	1	2	4	4	4	1.000	150	151	0.993	Round of 16
4	Perušič – Schweiner (CZE)	3	1	2	4	3	5	0.600	96	148	0.649	

Source: Tokyo 2020 and FIVB

26 July 2021; 10:00	Krasilnikov – Stoyanovskiy	2–1	(Mexico) Gaxiola – Rubio	Shiokaze Park, Tokyo; Referees: Rui Carvalho (POR), Brig Beatie (USA)
26 July 2021; 10:00	(24–26, 21–15, 18–16); Report			Shiokaze Park, Tokyo; Referees: Rui Carvalho (POR), Brig Beatie (USA)

26 July 2021; 17:00	Perušič – Schweiner (Czech Republic)	0–2; Awarded (Note: Team Perušič – Schweiner (CZE) was unable to play the match due to Covid-19 regulations. In accordance with the rules for Beach Volleyball, the other team were given two points and they were awarded a defeat and 1 point.)	(Latvia) Pļaviņš – Točs	Shiokaze Park, Tokyo
26 July 2021; 17:00	Report			Shiokaze Park, Tokyo

29 July 2021; 16:00	Perušič – Schweiner (Czech Republic)	2–1	(Mexico) Gaxiola – Rubio	Shiokaze Park, Tokyo; Referees: José María Padrón (ESP), Brig Beatie (USA)
29 July 2021; 16:00	(17–21, 21–16, 16–14); Report			Shiokaze Park, Tokyo; Referees: José María Padrón (ESP), Brig Beatie (USA)

29 July 2021; 17:00	Krasilnikov – Stoyanovskiy	1–2	(Latvia) Pļaviņš – Točs	Shiokaze Park, Tokyo; Referees: Rui Carvalho (POR), Juan Carlos Saavedra (COL)
29 July 2021; 17:00	(21–13, 19–21, 11–15); Report			Shiokaze Park, Tokyo; Referees: Rui Carvalho (POR), Juan Carlos Saavedra (COL)

31 July 2021; 15:00	Pļaviņš – Točs (Latvia)	0–2	(Mexico) Gaxiola – Rubio	Shiokaze Park, Tokyo; Referees: Brig Beatie (USA), Mariko Satomi (JPN)
31 July 2021; 15:00	(18–21, 16–21); Report			Shiokaze Park, Tokyo; Referees: Brig Beatie (USA), Mariko Satomi (JPN)

31 July 2021; 16:00	Krasilnikov – Stoyanovskiy	2–1	(Czech Republic) Perušič – Schweiner	Shiokaze Park, Tokyo; Referees: Juan Carlos Saavedra (COL), Agnieszka Myszkowska (POL)
31 July 2021; 16:00	(19–21, 21–13, 15–8); Report			Shiokaze Park, Tokyo; Referees: Juan Carlos Saavedra (COL), Agnieszka Myszkowska (POL)

=== Pool C ===
Pos	Team	Pld	W	L	Pts	SW	SL	SR	SPW	SPL	SPR	Qualification
1	Cherif – Ahmed (QAT)	3	3	0	6	6	0	MAX	129	103	1.252	Round of 16
2	Gibb – Bourne (USA)	3	2	1	5	4	2	2.000	121	119	1.017	Round of 16
3	Heidrich – Gerson (SUI)	3	1	2	4	2	5	0.400	133	139	0.957	Lucky losers
4	Carambula – Rossi (ITA)	3	0	3	3	1	6	0.167	125	147	0.850	

Source: Tokyo 2020 and FIVB

25 July 2021; 17:00	Cherif – Ahmed (Qatar)	2–0	(Switzerland) Heidrich – Gerson	Shiokaze Park, Tokyo; Referees: Juan Carlos Saavedra (COL), Charalampos Papadogoulas (GRE)
25 July 2021; 17:00	(21–17, 21–16); Report			Shiokaze Park, Tokyo; Referees: Juan Carlos Saavedra (COL), Charalampos Papadogoulas (GRE)

25 July 2021; 22:00	Gibb – Bourne (United States)	2–0	(Italy) Carambula – Rossi	Shiokaze Park, Tokyo; Referees: Mário Ferro (BRA), Roman Pristovakin (RUS)
25 July 2021; 22:00	(21–18, 21–19); Report			Shiokaze Park, Tokyo; Referees: Mário Ferro (BRA), Roman Pristovakin (RUS)

28 July 2021; 09:00	Gibb – Bourne (United States)	2–0	(Switzerland) Heidrich – Gerson	Shiokaze Park, Tokyo; Referees: Charalampos Papadogoulas (GRE), Agnieszka Myszkowska
28 July 2021; 09:00	(21–19, 23–21); Report			Shiokaze Park, Tokyo; Referees: Charalampos Papadogoulas (GRE), Agnieszka Myszkowska

28 July 2021; 20:00	Cherif – Ahmed (Qatar)	2–0	(Italy) Carambula – Rossi	Shiokaze Park, Tokyo; Referees: José María Padrón (ESP), Rui Carvalho (POR)
28 July 2021; 20:00	(24–22, 21–13); Report			Shiokaze Park, Tokyo; Referees: José María Padrón (ESP), Rui Carvalho (POR)

30 July 2021; 10:00	Carambula – Rossi (Italy)	1–2	(Switzerland) Heidrich – Gerson	Shiokaze Park, Tokyo; Referees: Brig Beatie (USA), Charalampos Papadogoulas (GRE)
30 July 2021; 10:00	(14–21, 26–24, 13–15); Report			Shiokaze Park, Tokyo; Referees: Brig Beatie (USA), Charalampos Papadogoulas (GRE)

30 July 2021; 22:00	Cherif – Ahmed (Qatar)	2–0	(United States) Gibb – Bourne	Shiokaze Park, Tokyo; Referees: Juan Carlos Saavedra (COL), José María Padrón (ESP)
30 July 2021; 22:00	(21–18, 21–17); Report			Shiokaze Park, Tokyo; Referees: Juan Carlos Saavedra (COL), José María Padrón (ESP)

=== Pool D ===
Pos	Team	Pld	W	L	Pts	SW	SL	SR	SPW	SPL	SPR	Qualification
1	Alison – Álvaro (BRA)	3	2	1	5	5	2	2.500	143	127	1.126	Round of 16
2	Brouwer – Meeuwsen (NED)	3	2	1	5	4	2	2.000	120	108	1.111	Round of 16
3	Lucena – Dalhausser (USA)	3	2	1	5	4	4	1.000	147	144	1.021	Round of 16
4	Azaad – Capogrosso (ARG)	3	0	3	3	1	6	0.167	107	138	0.775	

Updated to match(es) played on 29 July 2021. Source: Tokyo 2020 and FIVB

24 July 2021; 10:00	Alison – Álvaro (Brazil)	2–0	(Argentina) Azaad – Capogrosso	Shiokaze Park, Tokyo; Referees: Charalampos Papadogoulas (GRE), Rui Carvalho (POR)
24 July 2021; 10:00	(21–16, 21–17); Report			Shiokaze Park, Tokyo; Referees: Charalampos Papadogoulas (GRE), Rui Carvalho (POR)

24 July 2021; 21:00	Brouwer – Meeuwsen (Netherlands)	2–0	(United States) Lucena – Dalhausser	Shiokaze Park, Tokyo; Referees: Rui Carvalho (POR), Giovanni Bake (RSA)
24 July 2021; 21:00	(21–17, 21–18); Report			Shiokaze Park, Tokyo; Referees: Rui Carvalho (POR), Giovanni Bake (RSA)

27 July 2021; 12:00	Alison – Álvaro (Brazil)	1–2	(United States) Lucena – Dalhausser	Shiokaze Park, Tokyo; Referees: Roman Pristovakin (RUS), Osvaldo Sumavil (ARG)
27 July 2021; 12:00	(22–24, 21–19, 13–15); Report			Shiokaze Park, Tokyo; Referees: Roman Pristovakin (RUS), Osvaldo Sumavil (ARG)

27 July 2021; 21:00	Brouwer – Meeuwsen (Netherlands)	2–0	(Argentina) Azaad – Capogrosso	Shiokaze Park, Tokyo; Referees: Wang Lijun (CHN), Roman Pristovakin (RUS)
27 July 2021; 21:00	(21–14, 21–14); Report			Shiokaze Park, Tokyo; Referees: Wang Lijun (CHN), Roman Pristovakin (RUS)

29 July 2021; 11:00	Lucena – Dalhausser (United States)	2–1	(Argentina) Azaad – Capogrosso	Shiokaze Park, Tokyo; Referees: Davide Crescentini (ITA), Mariko Satomi (JPN)
29 July 2021; 11:00	(21–19, 18–21, 15–6); Report			Shiokaze Park, Tokyo; Referees: Davide Crescentini (ITA), Mariko Satomi (JPN)

29 July 2021; 22:00	Alison – Álvaro (Brazil)	2–0	(Netherlands) Brouwer – Meeuwsen	Shiokaze Park, Tokyo; Referees: Wang Lijun (CHN), Roman Pristovakin (RUS)
29 July 2021; 22:00	(21–14, 24–22); Report			Shiokaze Park, Tokyo; Referees: Wang Lijun (CHN), Roman Pristovakin (RUS)

=== Pool E ===
Pos	Team	Pld	W	L	Pts	SW	SL	SR	SPW	SPL	SPR	Qualification
1	Evandro – Schmidt (BRA)	3	3	0	6	6	2	3.000	151	128	1.180	Round of 16
2	Bryl – Fijałek (POL)	3	2	1	5	5	2	2.500	134	120	1.117	Round of 16
3	M. Grimalt – E. Grimalt (CHI)	3	1	2	4	3	4	0.750	125	120	1.042	Lucky losers
4	El Graoui – Abicha (MAR)	3	0	3	3	0	6	0.000	84	126	0.667	

Source: Tokyo 2020 and FIVB

25 July 2021; 11:00	Evandro – Schmidt (Brazil)	2–1	(Chile) M. Grimalt – E. Grimalt	Shiokaze Park, Tokyo; Referees: Osvaldo Sumavil (ARG), Mariko Satomi (JPN)
25 July 2021; 11:00	(21–15, 16–21, 15–12); Report			Shiokaze Park, Tokyo; Referees: Osvaldo Sumavil (ARG), Mariko Satomi (JPN)

25 July 2021; 16:00	Fijałek – Bryl (Poland)	2–0	(Morocco) El Graoui – Abicha	Shiokaze Park, Tokyo; Referees: Giovanni Bake (RSA), José María Padrón (ESP)
25 July 2021; 16:00	(21–17, 21–11); Report			Shiokaze Park, Tokyo; Referees: Giovanni Bake (RSA), José María Padrón (ESP)

27 July 2021; 15:00	Evandro – Schmidt (Brazil)	2–0	(Morocco) El Graoui – Abicha	Shiokaze Park, Tokyo; Referees: Brig Beatie (USA), Juan Carlos Saavedra (COL)
27 July 2021; 15:00	(21–14, 21–16); Report			Shiokaze Park, Tokyo; Referees: Brig Beatie (USA), Juan Carlos Saavedra (COL)

27 July 2021; 17:00	Fijałek – Bryl (Poland)	2–0	(Chile) M. Grimalt – E. Grimalt	Shiokaze Park, Tokyo; Referees: Charalampos Papadogoulas (GRE), Brig Beatie (USA)
27 July 2021; 17:00	(21–17, 21–18); Report			Shiokaze Park, Tokyo; Referees: Charalampos Papadogoulas (GRE), Brig Beatie (USA)

30 July 2021; 11:00	M. Grimalt – E. Grimalt (Chile)	2–0	(Morocco) El Graoui – Abicha	Shiokaze Park, Tokyo; Referees: Rui Carvalho (POR), Agnieszka Myszkowska (POL)
30 July 2021; 11:00	(21–14, 21–12); Report			Shiokaze Park, Tokyo; Referees: Rui Carvalho (POR), Agnieszka Myszkowska (POL)

30 July 2021; 21:00	Fijałek – Bryl (Poland)	1–2	(Brazil) Evandro – Schmidt	Shiokaze Park, Tokyo; Referees: Charalampos Papadogoulas (GRE), Brig Beatie (USA)
30 July 2021; 21:00	(21–19, 14–21, 15–17); Report			Shiokaze Park, Tokyo; Referees: Charalampos Papadogoulas (GRE), Brig Beatie (USA)

=== Pool F ===
Pos	Team	Pld	W	L	Pts	SW	SL	SR	SPW	SPL	SPR	Qualification
1	Nicolai – Lupo (ITA)	3	3	0	6	6	2	3.000	150	138	1.087	Round of 16
2	Thole – Wickler (GER)	3	2	1	5	5	2	2.500	138	118	1.169	Round of 16
3	Kantor – Łosiak (POL)	3	1	2	4	3	4	0.750	128	125	1.024	Lucky losers
4	Ishijima – Shiratori (JPN)	3	0	3	3	0	6	0.000	91	126	0.722	

Source: Tokyo 2020 and FIVB

25 July 2021; 10:00	Ishijima – Shiratori (Japan)	0–2	(Poland) Kantor – Łosiak	Shiokaze Park, Tokyo; Referees: Wang Lijun (CHN), Roman Pristovakin (RUS)
25 July 2021; 10:00	(15–21, 14–21); Report			Shiokaze Park, Tokyo; Referees: Wang Lijun (CHN), Roman Pristovakin (RUS)

25 July 2021; 20:00	Thole – Wickler (Germany)	1–2	(Italy) Nicolai – Lupo	Shiokaze Park, Tokyo; Referees: Roman Pristovakin (RUS), Wang Lijun (CHN)
25 July 2021; 20:00	(21–19, 19–21, 13–15); Report			Shiokaze Park, Tokyo; Referees: Roman Pristovakin (RUS), Wang Lijun (CHN)

27 July 2021; 10:00	Ishijima – Shiratori (Japan)	0–2	(Italy) Nicolai – Lupo	Shiokaze Park, Tokyo; Referees: Osvaldo Sumavil (ARG), Wang Lijun (CHN)
27 July 2021; 10:00	(19–21, 16–21); Report			Shiokaze Park, Tokyo; Referees: Osvaldo Sumavil (ARG), Wang Lijun (CHN)

27 July 2021; 20:00	Thole – Wickler (Germany)	2–0	(Poland) Kantor – Łosiak	Shiokaze Park, Tokyo; Referees: Osvaldo Sumavil (ARG), Mariko Satomi (JPN)
27 July 2021; 20:00	(22–20, 21–16); Report			Shiokaze Park, Tokyo; Referees: Osvaldo Sumavil (ARG), Mariko Satomi (JPN)

30 July 2021; 16:00	Nicolai – Lupo (Italy)	2–1	(Poland) Kantor – Łosiak	Shiokaze Park, Tokyo; Referees: Mário Ferro (BRA), Wang Lijun (CHN)
30 July 2021; 16:00	(21–19, 17–21, 15–10); Report			Shiokaze Park, Tokyo; Referees: Mário Ferro (BRA), Wang Lijun (CHN)

31 July 2021; 11:00	Ishijima – Shiratori (Japan)	0–2	(Germany) Thole – Wickler	Shiokaze Park, Tokyo; Referees: Giovanni Bake (RSA), Wang Lijun (CHN)
31 July 2021; 11:00	(16–21, 11–21); Report			Shiokaze Park, Tokyo; Referees: Giovanni Bake (RSA), Wang Lijun (CHN)

=== Lucky losers ===
The table below shows the ranking of third-placed teams in the preliminary round. The top two teams advanced to next round automatically. The other teams competed for the two remaining spots. The third-ranked team played against the sixth-ranked team, and the fourth-ranked team played against the fifth-ranked team.

Pos	Team	Pld	W	L	Pts	SW	SL	SR	SPW	SPL	SPR	Qualification
1	Lucena – Dalhausser (USA)	3	2	1	5	4	4	1.000	147	144	1.021	Round of 16
2	Gaxiola – Rubio (MEX)	3	1	2	4	4	4	1.000	150	151	0.993	Round of 16
3	M. Grimalt – E. Grimalt (CHI)	3	1	2	4	3	4	0.750	125	120	1.042	Lucky loser playoffs
4	Kantor – Łosiak (POL)	3	1	2	4	3	4	0.750	128	125	1.024	Lucky loser playoffs
5	Herrera – Gavira (ESP)	3	1	2	4	2	4	0.500	120	120	1.000	Lucky loser playoffs
6	Heidrich – Gerson (SUI)	3	1	2	4	2	5	0.400	133	139	0.957	Lucky loser playoffs

Source: Tokyo 2020 and FIVB

==== Lucky loser playoffs ====
31 July 2021; 21:00	Kantor – Łosiak (Poland)	1–2	(Spain) Herrera – Gavira	Shiokaze Park, Tokyo; Referees: Davide Crescentini (ITA), Osvaldo Sumavil (ARG)
31 July 2021; 21:00	(29–31, 21–19, 7–15); Report			Shiokaze Park, Tokyo; Referees: Davide Crescentini (ITA), Osvaldo Sumavil (ARG)

31 July 2021; 22:00	M. Grimalt – E. Grimalt (Chile)	2–0	(Switzerland) Heidrich – Gerson	Shiokaze Park, Tokyo; Referees: Mário Ferro (BRA), Roman Pristovakin (RUS)
31 July 2021; 22:00	(21–17, 21–18); Report			Shiokaze Park, Tokyo; Referees: Mário Ferro (BRA), Roman Pristovakin (RUS)

== Knockout stage ==
The round of sixteen pair up were determined by drawing of lots. The six first ranked teams in the preliminary pools were separated automatically. Then, the lucky loser playoffs winners were drawn. The two best third ranked were drawn next. And, the last drawing belonged to the second ranked teams. The teams from the same pool in the preliminary round could not meet in round of 16.

=== Bracket ===
Round of 16
2 August
Semenov – Leshukov (ROC)	2
M. Grimalt – E. Grimalt (CHI)	0
1 August
Mol – Sørum (NOR)	2
Brouwer – Meeuwsen (NED)	0
2 August
Evandro – Schmidt (BRA)	0
Pļaviņš – Točs (LAT)	2
2 August
Gaxiola – Rubio (MEX)	0
Alison – Álvaro (BRA)	2
1 August
Cherif – Ahmed (QAT)	2
Lucena – Dalhausser (USA)	1
2 August
Fijałek – Bryl (POL)	0
Nicolai – Lupo (ITA)	2
2 August
Gibb – Bourne (USA)	1
Thole – Wickler (GER)	2
2 August
Herrera – Gavira (ESP)	0
Krasilnikov – Stoyanovskiy (ROC)	2

Quarter-finals
4 August
Semenov – Leshukov (ROC)	0
Mol – Sørum (NOR)	2
4 August
Pļaviņš – Točs (LAT)	2
Alison – Álvaro (BRA)	0
4 August
Cherif – Ahmed (QAT)	2
Nicolai – Lupo (ITA)	0
4 August
Thole – Wickler (GER)	0
Krasilnikov – Stoyanovskiy (ROC)	2

Semi-finals
5 August
Mol – Sørum (NOR)	2
Pļaviņš – Točs (LAT)	0
5 August
Cherif – Ahmed (QAT)	0
Krasilnikov – Stoyanovskiy (ROC)	2

Gold medal
7 August
Mol – Sørum (NOR)	2
Krasilnikov – Stoyanovskiy (ROC)	0
Bronze medal
7 August
Pļaviņš – Točs (LAT)	0
Cherif – Ahmed (QAT)	2

=== Round of 16 ===
1 August 2021; 13:00	Cherif – Ahmed (Qatar)	2–1	(United States) Lucena – Dalhausser	Shiokaze Park, Tokyo; Referees: Osvaldo Sumavil (ARG), Roman Pristovakin (RUS)
1 August 2021; 13:00	(14–21, 21–19, 15–11); Report			Shiokaze Park, Tokyo; Referees: Osvaldo Sumavil (ARG), Roman Pristovakin (RUS)

1 August 2021; 22:00	Mol – Sørum (Norway)	2–0	(Netherlands) Brouwer – Meeuwsen	Shiokaze Park, Tokyo; Referees: Mário Ferro (BRA), Davide Crescentini (ITA)
1 August 2021; 22:00	(21–17, 21–19); Report			Shiokaze Park, Tokyo; Referees: Mário Ferro (BRA), Davide Crescentini (ITA)

2 August 2021; 13:00	Evandro – Schmidt (Brazil)	0–2	(Latvia) Pļaviņš – Točs	Shiokaze Park, Tokyo; Referees: Charalampos Papadogoulas (GRE), Giovanni Bake (RSA)
2 August 2021; 13:00	(19–21, 18–21); Report			Shiokaze Park, Tokyo; Referees: Charalampos Papadogoulas (GRE), Giovanni Bake (RSA)

2 August 2021; 14:00	Semenov – Leshukov	2–0	(Chile) M. Grimalt – E. Grimalt	Shiokaze Park, Tokyo; Referees: Davide Crescentini (ITA), Mário Ferro (BRA)
2 August 2021; 14:00	(21–16, 21–16); Report			Shiokaze Park, Tokyo; Referees: Davide Crescentini (ITA), Mário Ferro (BRA)

2 August 2021; 17:00	Fijałek – Bryl (Poland)	0–2	(Italy) Nicolai – Lupo	Shiokaze Park, Tokyo; Referees: Osvaldo Sumavil (ARG), José María Padrón (ESP)
2 August 2021; 17:00	(20–22, 18–21); Report			Shiokaze Park, Tokyo; Referees: Osvaldo Sumavil (ARG), José María Padrón (ESP)

2 August 2021; 18:00	Herrera – Gavira (Spain)	0–2	Krasilnikov – Stoyanovskiy	Shiokaze Park, Tokyo; Referees: Brig Beatie (USA), Rui Carvalho (POR)
2 August 2021; 18:00	(20–22, 17–21); Report			Shiokaze Park, Tokyo; Referees: Brig Beatie (USA), Rui Carvalho (POR)

2 August 2021; 21:00	Gaxiola – Rubio (Mexico)	0–2	(Brazil) Alison – Álvaro	Shiokaze Park, Tokyo; Referees: Roman Pristovakin (RUS), Giovanni Bake (RSA)
2 August 2021; 21:00	(14–21, 13–21); Report			Shiokaze Park, Tokyo; Referees: Roman Pristovakin (RUS), Giovanni Bake (RSA)

2 August 2021; 22:00	Gibb – Bourne (United States)	1–2	(Germany) Thole – Wickler	Shiokaze Park, Tokyo; Referees: Mário Ferro (BRA), Davide Crescentini (ITA)
2 August 2021; 22:00	(21–17, 15–21, 11–15); Report			Shiokaze Park, Tokyo; Referees: Mário Ferro (BRA), Davide Crescentini (ITA)

=== Quarterfinals ===
4 August 2021; 09:00	Semenov – Leshukov	0–2	(Norway) Mol – Sørum	Shiokaze Park, Tokyo; Referees: Rui Carvalho (POR), Juan Carlos Saavedra (COL)
4 August 2021; 09:00	(17–21, 19–21); Report			Shiokaze Park, Tokyo; Referees: Rui Carvalho (POR), Juan Carlos Saavedra (COL)

4 August 2021; 10:00	Pļaviņš – Točs (Latvia)	2–0	(Brazil) Alison – Álvaro	Shiokaze Park, Tokyo; Referees: Brig Beatie (USA), Charalampos Papadogoulas (GRE)
4 August 2021; 10:00	(21–16, 21–19); Report			Shiokaze Park, Tokyo; Referees: Brig Beatie (USA), Charalampos Papadogoulas (GRE)

4 August 2021; 21:00	Thole – Wickler (Germany)	0–2	Krasilnikov – Stoyanovskiy	Shiokaze Park, Tokyo; Referees: Charalampos Papadogoulas (GRE), Davide Crescentini (ITA)
4 August 2021; 21:00	(16–21, 19–21); Report			Shiokaze Park, Tokyo; Referees: Charalampos Papadogoulas (GRE), Davide Crescentini (ITA)

4 August 2021; 22:00	Cherif – Ahmed (Qatar)	2–0	(Italy) Nicolai – Lupo	Shiokaze Park, Tokyo; Referees: Mário Ferro (BRA), José María Padrón (ESP)
4 August 2021; 22:00	(21–17, 23–21); Report			Shiokaze Park, Tokyo; Referees: Mário Ferro (BRA), José María Padrón (ESP)

=== Semifinals ===
5 August 2021; 21:00	Mol – Sørum (Norway)	2–0	(Latvia) Pļaviņš – Točs	Shiokaze Park, Tokyo; Referees: Osvaldo Sumavil (ARG), Charalampos Papadogoulas (GRE)
5 August 2021; 21:00	(21–15, 21–16); Report			Shiokaze Park, Tokyo; Referees: Osvaldo Sumavil (ARG), Charalampos Papadogoulas (GRE)

5 August 2021; 22:00	Cherif – Ahmed (Qatar)	0–2	Krasilnikov – Stoyanovskiy	Shiokaze Park, Tokyo; Referees: Davide Crescentini (ITA), Brig Beatie (USA)
5 August 2021; 22:00	(19–21, 17–21); Report			Shiokaze Park, Tokyo; Referees: Davide Crescentini (ITA), Brig Beatie (USA)

=== Bronze medal game ===
7 August 2021; 10:00	Pļaviņš – Točs (Latvia)	0–2	(Qatar) Cherif – Ahmed	Shiokaze Park, Tokyo; Referees: Brig Beatie (USA), Roman Pristovakin (RUS)
7 August 2021; 10:00	(12–21, 18–21); Report			Shiokaze Park, Tokyo; Referees: Brig Beatie (USA), Roman Pristovakin (RUS)

=== Gold medal game ===
7 August 2021; 11:30	Mol – Sørum (Norway)	2–0	Krasilnikov – Stoyanovskiy	Shiokaze Park, Tokyo; Referees: Charalampos Papadogoulas (GRE), José María Padrón (ESP)
7 August 2021; 11:30	(21–17, 21–18); Report			Shiokaze Park, Tokyo; Referees: Charalampos Papadogoulas (GRE), José María Padrón (ESP)

== Final ranking ==
Rank	Team
Gold medal	Mol – Sørum (NOR)
Silver medal	Krasilnikov – Stoyanovskiy (ROC)
Bronze medal	Cherif – Ahmed (QAT)
4	Pļaviņš – Točs (LAT)
5	Alison – Álvaro (BRA)
5	Thole – Wickler (GER)
5	Nicolai – Lupo (ITA)
5	Semenov – Leshukov (ROC)
9	Evandro – Schmidt (BRA)
9	M. Grimalt – E. Grimalt (CHI)
9	Gaxiola – Rubio (MEX)
9	Brouwer – Meeuwsen (NED)
9	Fijałek – Bryl (POL)
9	Herrera – Gavira (ESP)
9	Gibb – Bourne (USA)
9	Lucena – Dalhausser (USA)
17	Kantor – Łosiak (POL)
17	Heidrich – Gerson (SUI)
19	Azaad – Capogrosso (ARG)
19	McHugh – Schumann (AUS)
19	Perušič – Schweiner (CZE)
19	Carambula – Rossi (ITA)
19	Ishijima – Shiratori (JPN)
19	El Graoui – Abicha (MAR)

== See also ==
- Beach volleyball at the 2020 Summer Olympics – Women's tournament
