= 2020 FIVB Beach Volleyball World Tour =

2019–2020 FIVB Beach Volleyball World Tour
Tournament details
- Host country: Various
- Dates: October 2019 – September 2020
- Venues: 15 (in 15 host cities)

The 2020 FIVB Beach Volleyball World Tour is the global elite professional beach volleyball circuit organized by the Fédération Internationale de Volleyball (FIVB) for the 2019–20 beach volleyball season. Starts in late early October 2019, the 2020 FIVB Beach Volleyball World Tour Calendar comprised by two FIVB World Tour 4-star tournaments, one 3-star, two 2-star and eleven 1-star event, all organised by the FIVB. Several events were postponed or canceled due to COVID-19 pandemic.

== Schedule ==
Key

World Tour Finals
5-star tournament/Major Series
4-star tournament
3-star tournament
2-star tournament
1-star tournament

=== Men ===
Tournament	Champions	Runners-up	Third place	Fourth place
Bandar Torkaman Open; Bandar Torkaman, Iran; US$5,000; 1–4 October 2019	Nuttanon Inkiew (THA); Sedtawat Padsawud (THA); 17–21, 21–17, 14–12 ret.	Alireza Aghajani (IRI); Javad Firouzpour (IRI)	Bahman Salemi (IRI); Arash Vakili (IRI); 21–17, 21–16	Takashi Tsuchiya (JPN); Hitoshi Murakami (JPN)
Qinzhou Open; Qinzhou, China; US$75,000; 29 October–3 November 2019	Adrian Heidrich (SUI); Mirco Gerson (SUI); 21–13, 21–16	Martin Ermacora (AUT); Moritz Pristauz (AUT)	Valeriy Samoday (RUS); Igor Velichko (RUS); 16–21, 22–20, 15–8	Ruslan Bykanov (RUS); Alexander Likholetov (RUS)
Tel Aviv Open; Tel Aviv, Israel; US$5,000; 6–9 November 2019	Samuele Cottafava (ITA); Jakob Windisch (ITA); 21–12, 21–17	Martin Hansen (DEN); Daniel Thomsen (DEN)	Sergey Prokopyev (RUS); Aleksandr Kramarenko (RUS) w/o	Sean Faiga (ISR); Netanel Ohana (ISR)
Aspire Beach Volleyball Cup Doha; Doha, Qatar; US$5,000; 12–15 November 2019	Jędrzej Brożyniak (POL); Piotr Janiak (POL); 18–21, 21–15, 15–12	Petr Bakhnar (RUS); Yury Bogatov (RUS)	David Åhman (SWE); Jonatan Hellvig (SWE); 22–24, 21–12, 18–16	Nouh Al-Jalbubi (OMA); Mazin Al-Hashmi (OMA)
Chetumal Open; Chetumal, Mexico; US$150,000; 13–17 November 2019	Taylor Crabb (USA); Jake Gibb (USA); 21–16, 16–21, 15–12	Alexander Brouwer (NED); Robert Meeuwsen (NED)	Trevor Crabb (USA); Tri Bourne (USA); 21–16, 21–12	Alexander Walkenhorst (GER); Sven Winter (GER)
Dargahan Cup Qeshm Island; Dargahan, Iran; US$5,000; 7–10 January 2020	Alireza Aghajani (IRI); Javad Firouzpour (IRI); 21–17, 21–15	Bahman Salemi (IRI); Arash Vakili (IRI)	Rahman Raoufi (IRI); Abolhamed Mirzaali (IRI); 21–15, 21–18	Benlouaer Ziad (QAT); Saifeddine Elmajid (QAT)
VolleyFest Cook Islands; Avarua, Cook Islands; US$5,000; 14–17 January 2020	Griffin Muller (NZL); Sam O'Dea (NZL); 21–14, 20–22, 15–7	Christopher Austin (USA); Earl Schultz (USA)	Adam Roberts (USA); Travis Mewhirter (USA); 21–18, 22–20	Takashi Tsuchiya (JPN); Hitoshi Murakami (JPN)
Anchor Beach Volleyball Carnival; Phnom Penh, Cambodia; US$25,000; 20–23 February 2020	Christopher McHugh (AUS); Damien Schumann (AUS); 21–16, 30–28	Christoph Dressler (AUT); Alexander Huber (AUT)	Robin Sowa (GER); Lukas Pfretzschner (GER); 21–18, 17–21, 24–22	Florian Schnetzer (AUT); Laurenz Leitner (AUT)
Katara Beach Volleyball Cup; Doha, Qatar; US$150,000; 1–13 March 2020	Michał Bryl (POL); Grzegorz Fijałek (POL); 16–21, 21–19, 15–11	Josué Gaxiola (MEX); José Luis Rubio (MEX)	Paolo Nicolai (ITA); Daniele Lupo (ITA); 21–19, 21–17	Evandro Oliveira (BRA); Bruno Oscar Schmidt (BRA)
Langkawi Open; Langkawi, Malaysia; US$5,000; 12–15 March 2020	Jędrzej Brożyniak (POL); Piotr Janiak (POL); 21–19, 14–21, 15–8	Martin Johansson (SWE); Alexander Annerstedt (SWE)	Wang Chin-ju (TPE); Hsieh Ya-jen (TPE); 21–16, 21–18	Dunwinit Kaewsai (THA); Prathip Sukto (THA)
Star-1 Ljubljana presented by HSE; Ljubljana, Slovenia; US$5,000; 30 July–2 August 2020	Tiziano Andreatta (ITA); Andrea Abbiati (ITA); 21–18, 15–21, 15–11	Clemens Doppler (AUT); Alexander Horst (AUT)	Christoph Dressler (AUT); Alexander Huber (AUT); 22–24, 21–10, 15–8	Tadej Boženk (SLO); Vid Jakopin (SLO)
Baden Open presented by Sport.Land.Nö; Baden, Austria; US$5,000; 19–23 August 2020	Robin Seidl (AUT); Philipp Waller (AUT); 21–17, 16–21, 15–11	Adrian Heidrich (SUI); Mirco Gerson (SUI)	Quentin Métral (SUI); Yves Haussener (SUI); 25–23, 21–19	Jan Pokeršnik (SLO); Nejc Zemljak (SLO)
World Tour 1-Star Montpellier; Montpellier, France; US$5,000; 25–29 August 2020	David Åhman (SWE); Jonatan Hellvig (SWE); 18–21, 21–17, 15–9	Quincy Ayé (FRA); Arnaud Gauthier-Rat (FRA)	Leon Luini (NED); Matthew Immers (NED); 21–19, 24–22	Timothée Platre (FRA); Arnaud Loiseau (FRA)
World Tour 1-Star Vilnius; Vilnius, Lithuania; US$5,000; 11–13 September 2020	Kusti Nõlvak (EST); Mart Tiisaar (EST); 12–21, 22–20, 15–12	Artur Vasiljev (LTU); Robert Juchnevic (LTU)	Tobia Marchetto (ITA); Alberto di Silvestre (ITA); 23–21, 19–21, 16–14	Dimitriy Korotkov (EST); Timo Lõhmus (EST)

=== Women ===
Tournament	Champions	Runners-up	Third place	Fourth place
Qinzhou Open; Qinzhou, China; US$75,000; 29 October–3 November 2019	Karla Borger (GER); Julia Sude (GER); 21–16, 21–19	Kerri Walsh Jennings (USA); Brooke Sweat (USA)	Wen Shuhui (CHN); Wang Jingzhe (CHN); 23–21, 22–24, 15–12	Mariafe Artacho (AUS); Taliqua Clancy (AUS)
Tel Aviv Open; Tel Aviv, Israel; US$5,000; 6–9 November 2019	Kaho Sakaguchi (JPN); Reika Murakami (JPN); 21–19, 21–16	Simone Okholm (DEN); Line Hansen (DEN)	Alexandra Shiryayeva (RUS); Ekaterina Syrtseva (RUS); 21–16, 21–19	Eva Freiberger (AUT); Valerie Teufl (AUT)
Chetumal Open; Chetumal, Mexico; US$150,000; 13–17 November 2019	Taliqua Clancy (AUS); Mariafe Artacho (AUS); 15–21, 21–14, 15–12	Wang Fan (CHN); Xia Xinyi (CHN)	Madelein Meppelink (NED); Sanne Keizer (NED) w/o	Talita Antunes (BRA); Taiana Lima (BRA)
Siem Reap Open; Siem Reap, Cambodia; US$25,000; 5–9 February 2020	Lauren Fendrick (USA); Sara Hughes (USA); 21–13, 21–16	Kelly Reeves (USA); Terese Cannon (USA)	Yurika Sakaguchi (JPN); Chiyo Suzuki (JPN); 21–18, 21–18	Cecilie Olsen (DEN); Sofia Bisgaard (DEN)
Guam Beach Cup; Tamuning, Guam; US$5,000; 5–8 March 2020	Chiyo Suzuki (JPN); Yurika Sakaguchi (JPN); 21–16, 21–12	Sarah Schermerhorn (USA); Kimberly Hildreth (USA)	Ayumi Shiratori (JPN); Suzuka Hashimoto (JPN); 21–15, 21–12	Delayne Maple (USA); Megan Kraft (USA)
Langkawi Open; Langkawi, Malaysia; US$5,000; 12–15 March 2020	Kou Nai-han (TPE); Liu Pi-hsin (TPE); 23–21, 21–18	Dorina Klinger (AUT); Ronja Klinger (AUT)	Kaho Sakaguchi (JPN); Reika Murakami (JPN) w/o	Chiyo Suzuki (JPN); Yurika Sakaguchi (JPN)
Star-1 Ljubljana presented by HSE; Ljubljana, Slovenia; US$5,000; 30 July–2 August 2020	Clara Windeleff (DEN); Line Trans Hansen (DEN); 21–11, 21–10	Cecilie Olsen (DEN); Sofia Bisgaard (DEN)	Sarah Cools (BEL); Lisa van den Vonder (BEL); 21–14, 21–19	Varvara Brailko (LAT); Anete Namiķe (LAT)
Baden Open presented by Sport.Land.Nö; Baden, Austria; US$5,000; 19–23 August 2020	Tanja Hüberli (SUI); Nina Betschart (SUI) w/o	Anouk Vergé-Dépré (SUI); Joana Heidrich (SUI)	Isabel Schneider (GER); Victoria Bieneck (GER); 21–16, 20–22, 15–13	Julia Sude (GER); Karla Borger (GER)
World Tour 1-Star Vilnius; Vilnius, Lithuania; US$5,000; 11–13 September 2020	Claudia Scampoli (ITA); Margherita Bianchin (ITA); 21–17, 21–11	Marta Ozoliņa (LAT); Luize Skrastiņa (LAT)	María Rivas (CHI); Chris Vorpahl (CHI); 21–19, 21–19	Ieva Dumbauskaitė (LTU); Karole Virbickaitė (LTU)

== Medal table by country ==
Rank	Nation	Gold	Silver	Bronze	Total
1	Italy	3	0	2	5
2	Poland	3	0	0	3
3	United States	2	4	2	8
4	Switzerland	2	2	1	5
5	Japan	2	0	3	5
6	Australia	2	0	0	2
7	Austria	1	4	1	6
8	Denmark	1	3	0	4
9	Iran	1	2	2	5
10	Sweden	1	1	1	3
11	Germany	1	0	2	3
12	Chinese Taipei	1	0	1	2
13	Estonia	1	0	0	1
13	New Zealand	1	0	0	1
13	Thailand	1	0	0	1
16	Russia	0	1	3	4
17	Netherlands	0	1	2	3
18	China	0	1	1	2
19	France	0	1	0	1
19	Latvia	0	1	0	1
19	Lithuania	0	1	0	1
19	Mexico	0	1	0	1
23	Belgium	0	0	1	1
23	Chile	0	0	1	1
Totals (24 entries)		23	23	23	69
