= 2018 European Beach Volleyball Championships =

International beach volleyball competition

2018 European Beach Volleyball Championship

Tournament details
- Host country: Netherlands
- Dates: 15–22 July
- Teams: 64
- Venues: 4 (in 4 host cities)

The 2018 European Beach Volleyball Championship was held from the 15th until the 22nd of July, 2018 in Apeldoorn, Rotterdam, The Hague, and Utrecht in The Netherlands. The draw consisted of 32 men's & 32 women's teams, with 20,000 EUR prize money per gender.

== Men's tournament ==
=== Preliminary round ===
==== Pool A ====
Pos	Team	Pld	W	L	Pts	SW	SL	SR	SPW	SPL	SPR	Qualification
1	(Switzerland) Beeler–Krattiger	3	2	1	5	5	3	1.667	145	128	1.133	Round of 16
2	(Czech Republic) Perušič–Schweiner	3	2	1	5	4	4	1.000	138	133	1.038	Round of 24
3	(Italy) Nicolai–Lupo	3	1	2	4	4	4	1.000	137	135	1.015	Round of 24
4	(Serbia) Kolarić–Basta	3	1	2	4	3	5	0.600	123	147	0.837	

Date	Time		Score		Set 1	Set 2	Set 3	Total	Report
16 Jul	17:30	Perušič–Schweiner (Czech Republic)	0–2	(Switzerland) Beeler–Krattiger	16–21	14–21		30–42	
16 Jul	18:30	Nicolai–Lupo (Italy)	2–0	(Serbia) Kolarić–Basta	21–13	21–16		42–29	
18 Jul	19:30	Nicolai–Lupo (Italy)	1–2	(Switzerland) Beeler–Krattiger	21–16	18–21	9–15	48–52	
18 Jul	20:30	Perušič–Schweiner (Czech Republic)	2–1	(Serbia) Kolarić–Basta	18–21	21–13	15–10	54–44	
19 Jul	13:00	Beeler–Krattiger (Switzerland)	1–2	(Serbia) Kolarić–Basta	21–14	17–21	13–15	51–50	
19 Jul	17:30	Nicolai–Lupo (Italy)	1–2	(Czech Republic) Perušič–Schweiner	21–18	14–21	12–15	47–54	

==== Pool B ====
Pos	Team	Pld	W	L	Pts	SW	SL	SR	SPW	SPL	SPR	Qualification
1	(Netherlands) Brouwer–Meeuwsen	3	3	0	6	6	0	MAX	139	112	1.241	Round of 16
2	(Belgium) Koekelkoren–Van Walle	3	2	1	5	4	2	2.000	112	105	1.067	Round of 24
3	(Turkey) Giginoğlu–Göğtepe	3	1	2	4	2	4	0.500	121	122	0.992	Round of 24
4	(Poland) Kujawiak–Rudol	3	0	3	3	0	6	0.000	102	135	0.756	

Date	Time		Score		Set 1	Set 2	Set 3	Total	Report
16 Jul	18:30	Kujawiak–Rudol (Poland)	0–2	(Belgium) Koekelkoren–Van Walle	14–21	12–21		26–42	
16 Jul	19:45	Brouwer–Meeuwsen (Netherlands)	2–0	(Turkey) Giginoğlu–Göğtepe	25–23	21–19		46–42	
18 Jul	19:45	Brouwer–Meeuwsen (Netherlands)	2–0	(Belgium) Koekelkoren–Van Walle	21–16	21–12		42–28	
18 Jul	20:35	Kujawiak–Rudol (Poland)	0–2	(Turkey) Giginoğlu–Göğtepe	17–21	17–21		34–42	
19 Jul	17:30	Koekelkoren–Van Walle (Belgium)	2–0	(Turkey) Giginoğlu–Göğtepe	21–19	21–18		42–37	
19 Jul	18:30	Brouwer–Meeuwsen (Netherlands)	2–0	(Poland) Kujawiak–Rudol	21–14	30–28		51–42	

==== Pool C ====
Pos	Team	Pld	W	L	Pts	SW	SL	SR	SPW	SPL	SPR	Qualification
1	(Russia) Semenov–Leshukov	3	3	0	6	6	0	MAX	126	94	1.340	Round of 16
2	(Austria) Doppler–Horst	3	2	1	5	4	3	1.333	135	120	1.125	Round of 24
3	(Poland) Prudel–Szałankiewicz	3	1	2	4	5	3	1.667	143	145	0.986	Round of 24
4	(Netherlands) Van der Ham–Vismans	3	0	3	3	1	6	0.167	94	139	0.676	

Date	Time		Score		Set 1	Set 2	Set 3	Total	Report
16 Jul	19:30	Prudel–Szałankiewicz (Poland)	0–2	(Russia) Semenov–Leshukov	15–21	19–21		34–42	
16 Jul	20:30	Doppler–Horst (Austria)	2–0	(Netherlands) Van der Ham–Vismans	21–13	21–11		42–24	
17 Jul	14:00	Prudel–Szałankiewicz (Poland)	2–1	(Netherlands) Van der Ham–Vismans	19–21	21–15	15–10	55–46	
17 Jul	15:00	Doppler–Horst (Austria)	0–2	(Russia) Semenov–Leshukov	19–21	17–21		36–42	
19 Jul	12:00	Doppler–Horst (Austria)	2–1	(Poland) Prudel–Szałankiewicz	27–25	15–21	15–8	57–54	
19 Jul	13:00	Semenov–Leshukov (Russia)	2–0	(Netherlands) Van der Ham–Vismans	21–12	21–12		42–24	

==== Pool D ====
Pos	Team	Pld	W	L	Pts	SW	SL	SR	SPW	SPL	SPR	Qualification
1	(Poland) Kantor–Łosiak	3	3	0	6	6	1	6.000	136	121	1.124	Round of 16
2	(Switzerland) Heidrich–Gerson	3	1	2	4	3	4	0.750	122	131	0.931	Round of 24
3	(Netherlands) Boehlé–Van de Velde	3	1	2	4	3	4	0.750	153	152	1.007	Round of 24
4	(Italy) Caminati–Rossi	3	1	2	4	3	5	0.600	150	157	0.955	

Date	Time		Score		Set 1	Set 2	Set 3	Total	Report
15 Jul	19:45	Caminati–Rossi (Italy)	1–2	(Netherlands) Boehlé–Van de Velde	18–21	31–29	9–15	58–65	
16 Jul	18:30	Kantor–Łosiak (Poland)	2–0	(Switzerland) Heidrich–Gerson	21–14	21–16		42–30	
17 Jul	15:00	Heidrich–Gerson (Switzerland)	1–2	(Italy) Caminati–Rossi	21–18	17–21	12–15	50–54	
17 Jul	18:30	Kantor–Łosiak (Poland)	2–1	(Netherlands) Boehlé–Van de Velde	14–21	23–21	15–11	52–53	
19 Jul	12:00	Kantor–Łosiak (Poland)	2–0	(Italy) Caminati–Rossi	21–19	21–19		42–38	
19 Jul	13:00	Heidrich–Gerson (Switzerland)	2–0	(Netherlands) Boehlé–Van de Velde	21–19	21–16		42–35	

==== Pool E ====
Pos	Team	Pld	W	L	Pts	SW	SL	SR	SPW	SPL	SPR	Qualification
1	(Norway) A. Mol–Sørum	3	3	0	6	6	0	MAX	126	81	1.556	Round of 16
2	(France) Thiercy–Gauthier-Rat	3	1	2	4	3	4	0.750	122	122	1.000	Round of 24
3	(Russia) Sivolap–Yarzutkin	3	1	2	4	2	4	0.500	97	120	0.808	Round of 24
4	(Russia) Krasilnikov–Lyamin	3	1	2	4	2	5	0.400	114	136	0.838	

Date	Time		Score		Set 1	Set 2	Set 3	Total	Report
16 Jul	19:30	Krasilnikov–Lyamin (Russia)	0–2	(Russia) Sivolap–Yarzutkin	17–21	19–21		36–42	
16 Jul	20:30	A. Mol–Sørum (Norway)	2–0	(France) Thiercy–Gauthier-Rat	21–10	21–18		42–28	
18 Jul	19:30	Krasilnikov–Lyamin (Russia)	2–1	(France) Thiercy–Gauthier-Rat	21–18	14–21	15–13	50–52	
18 Jul	20:30	A. Mol–Sørum (Norway)	2–0	(Russia) Sivolap–Yarzutkin	21–10	21–15		42–25	
19 Jul	17:30	Sivolap–Yarzutkin (Russia)	0–2	(France) Thiercy–Gauthier-Rat	15–21	15–21		30–42	
19 Jul	18:30	Krasilnikov–Lyamin (Russia)	0–2	(Norway) A. Mol–Sørum	15–21	13–21		28–42	

==== Pool F ====
Pos	Team	Pld	W	L	Pts	SW	SL	SR	SPW	SPL	SPR	Qualification
1	(Russia) Stoyanovskiy–Velichko	3	3	0	6	6	1	6.000	140	111	1.261	Round of 16
2	(Latvia) Pļaviņš–Točs	3	2	1	5	5	2	2.500	132	111	1.189	Round of 24
3	(Norway) Berntsen–H. Mol	3	1	2	4	2	4	0.500	106	107	0.991	Round of 24
4	(Czech Republic) Dumek–Berčík	3	0	3	3	0	6	0.000	77	126	0.611	

Date	Time		Score		Set 1	Set 2	Set 3	Total	Report
16 Jul	17:30	Stoyanovskiy–Velichko (Russia)	2–0	(Czech Republic) Dumek–Berčík	21–12	21–15		42–27	
16 Jul	18:30	Pļaviņš–Točs (Latvia)	2–0	(Norway) Berntsen–H. Mol	21–13	21–15		42–28	
18 Jul	19:30	Stoyanovskiy–Velichko (Russia)	2–0	(Norway) Berntsen–H. Mol	21–17	21–19		42–36	
18 Jul	20:30	Pļaviņš–Točs (Latvia)	2–0	(Czech Republic) Dumek–Berčík	21–15	21–12		42–27	
19 Jul	18:30	Stoyanovskiy–Velichko (Russia)	2–1	(Latvia) Pļaviņš–Točs	19–21	21–13	16–14	56–48	
19 Jul	17:30	Berntsen–H. Mol (Norway)	2–0	(Czech Republic) Dumek–Berčík	21–15	21–8		42–23	

==== Pool G ====
Pos	Team	Pld	W	L	Pts	SW	SL	SR	SPW	SPL	SPR	Qualification
1	(Latvia) Šmēdiņš–Samoilovs	3	3	0	6	6	1	6.000	132	116	1.138	Round of 16
2	(Poland) Fijałek–Bryl	3	2	1	5	4	2	2.000	118	102	1.157	Round of 24
3	(Germany) Bergmann–Harms	3	1	2	4	3	5	0.600	133	135	0.985	Round of 24
4	(Lithuania) Rumševičius–Každailis	3	0	3	3	1	6	0.167	110	140	0.786	

Date	Time		Score		Set 1	Set 2	Set 3	Total	Report
16 Jul	17:30	Šmēdiņš–Samoilovs (Latvia)	2–1	(Germany) Bergmann–Harms	21–13	11–21	15–12	47–46	
16 Jul	20:35	Fijałek–Bryl (Poland)	2–0	(Lithuania) Rumševičius–Každailis	21–11	21–17		42–28	
17 Jul	15:00	Šmēdiņš–Samoilovs (Latvia)	2–0	(Lithuania) Rumševičius–Každailis	21–16	22–20		43–36	
17 Jul	17:30	Fijałek–Bryl (Poland)	2–0	(Germany) Bergmann–Harms	21–15	21–17		42–32	
19 Jul	12:00	Rumševičius–Každailis (Lithuania)	1–2	(Germany) Bergmann–Harms	14–21	21–19	11–15	46–55	
19 Jul	13:00	Šmēdiņš–Samoilovs (Latvia)	2–0	(Poland) Fijałek–Bryl	21–16	21–18		42–34	

==== Pool H ====
Pos	Team	Pld	W	L	Pts	SW	SL	SR	SPW	SPL	SPR	Qualification
1	(Spain) Herrera–Gavira	3	3	0	6	6	1	6.000	138	112	1.232	Round of 16
2	(Netherlands) Varenhorst–Bouter	3	2	1	5	4	2	2.000	120	104	1.154	Round of 24
3	(France) Krou–Aye	3	1	2	4	2	4	0.500	98	117	0.838	Round of 24
4	(Austria) Winter–Hörl	3	0	3	3	1	6	0.167	113	136	0.831	

Date	Time		Score		Set 1	Set 2	Set 3	Total	Report
16 Jul	19:45	Varenhorst–Bouter (Netherlands)	2–0	(France) Krou–Aye	21–9	21–14		42–23	
16 Jul	20:35	Herrera–Gavira (Spain)	2–1	(Austria) Winter–Hörl	16–21	21–15	15–7	52–43	
17 Jul	15:00	Herrera–Gavira (Spain)	2–0	(France) Krou–Aye	21–14	21–19		42–33	
17 Jul	18:30	Varenhorst–Bouter (Netherlands)	2–0	(Austria) Winter–Hörl	21–19	21–18		42–37	
19 Jul	12:00	Krou–Aye (France)	2–0	(Austria) Winter–Hörl	21–16	21–17		42–33	
19 Jul	18:30	Herrera–Gavira (Spain)	2–0	(Netherlands) Varenhorst–Bouter	21–15	23–21		44–36	

=== Knockout stage ===
A draw will be held to determine the pairings.

==== Round of 24 ====
Date	Time		Score		Set 1	Set 2	Set 3	Total	Report
20 Jul	15:00	Doppler–Horst (Austria)	1–2	(France) Krou–Aye	27–25	15–21	9–15	51–61	
20 Jul	16:00	Thiercy–Gauthier-Rat (France)	1–2	(Poland) Prudel–Szałankiewicz	14–21	21–18	8–15	43–54	
20 Jul	16:00	Heidrich–Gerson (Switzerland)	2–1	(Italy) Nicolai-Lupo	21–19	21–23	15–12	57–44	
20 Jul	17:00	Perušič–Schweiner (Czech Republic)	2–1	(Netherlands) Boehlé–Van de Velde	21–13	15–21	15–11	51–45	
20 Jul	18:00	Varenhorst–Bouter (Netherlands)	2–1	(Germany) Bergmann–Harms	21–15	19–21	15–13	55–49	
20 Jul	17:00	Koekelkoren–Van Walle (Belgium)	2–1	(Norway) Berntsen–H. Mol	14–21	26–24	17–15	57–60	
20 Jul	17:00	Fijałek–Bryl (Poland)	2–0	(Turkey) Giginoğlu–Göğtepe	21–12	21–12		42–24	
20 Jul	18:00	Pļaviņš–Točs (Latvia)	2–0	(Russia) Sivolap–Yarzutkin	21–14	21–14		42–28	

==== Round of 16 ====
Date	Time		Score		Set 1	Set 2	Set 3	Total	Report
20 Jul	19:45	Brouwer–Meeuwsen (Netherlands)	2–0	(France) Krou–Aye	24–22	21–15		45–37	
20 Jul	20:35	Šmēdiņš–Samoilovs (Latvia)	2–0	(Poland) Prudel–Szałankiewicz	21–19	21–18		42–37	
21 Jul	12:00	Stoyanovskiy–Velichko (Russia)	2–1	(Switzerland) Heidrich–Gerson	21–17	16–21	15–12	52–50	
21 Jul	13:00	Semenov–Leshukov (Russia)	2–0	(Czech Republic) Perušič–Schweiner	22–20	21–12		43–32	
21 Jul	13:15	Kantor–Łosiak (Poland)	1–2	(Netherlands) Varenhorst–Bouter	21–15	16–21	10–15	47–51	
21 Jul	14:15	A. Mol–Sørum (Norway)	2–1	(Belgium) Koekelkoren–Van Walle	21–18	19–21	15–11	55–50	
21 Jul	15:45	Herrera–Gavira (Spain)	2–0	(Poland) Fijałek–Bryl	21–19	21–16		42–35	
21 Jul	16:45	Beeler–Krattiger (Switzerland)	2–1	(Latvia) Pļaviņš–Točs	15–21	21–19	16–14	52–54	

==== Quarterfinals ====
Date	Time		Score		Set 1	Set 2	Set 3	Total	Report
21 Jul	17:00	Šmēdiņš–Samoilovs (Latvia)	2–1	(Netherlands) Brouwer–Meeuwsen	13–21	22–20	15–10	50–51	
21 Jul	19:45	Semenov–Leshukov (Russia)	2–0	(Russia) Stoyanovskiy–Velichko	26–24	21–17		47–41	
21 Jul	16:00	A. Mol–Sørum (Norway)	2–1	(Netherlands) Varenhorst–Bouter	13–21	21–16	15–11	49–48	
21 Jul	17:15	Beeler–Krattiger (Switzerland)	0–2	(Spain) Herrera–Gavira	19–21	18–21		37–42	

==== Semifinals ====
Date	Time		Score		Set 1	Set 2	Set 3	Total	Report
22 Jul	15:00	Semenov–Leshukov (Russia)	0–2	(Latvia) Šmēdiņš–Samoilovs	15–21	15–21		30–42	
22 Jul	16:00	Herrera–Gavira (Spain)	0–2	(Norway) A. Mol–Sørum	19–21	16–21		35–42	

==== Third place game ====
Date	Time		Score		Set 1	Set 2	Set 3	Total	Report
22 Jul	18:30	Herrera–Gavira (Spain)	2–1	(Russia) Semenov–Leshukov	21–17	13–21	15–12	49–50	

==== Final ====
Date	Time		Score		Set 1	Set 2	Set 3	Total	Report
22 Jul	19:45	Šmēdiņš–Samoilovs (Latvia)	0–2	(Norway) A. Mol–Sørum	17–21	13–21		30–42	

== Women's tournament ==
=== Preliminary round ===
==== Pool A ====
Pos	Team	Pld	W	L	Pts	SW	SL	SR	SPW	SPL	SPR	Qualification
1	(Spain) Fernández–Baquerizo	3	2	1	5	4	2	2.000	122	97	1.258	Round of 16
2	(Italy) Menegatti–Giombini	3	2	1	5	4	3	1.333	128	87	1.471	Round of 24
3	(Germany) Laboureur–Sude	3	2	1	5	5	2	2.500	129	92	1.402	Round of 24
4	(Poland) Kołosińska–Kociołek	3	0	3	1	0	6	0.000	23	126	0.183	

Date	Time		Score		Set 1	Set 2	Set 3	Total	Report
17 Jul	12:00	Kołosińska–Kociołek (Poland)	Injury POL	(Spain) Fernández–Baquerizo				23–42	
17 Jul	13:00	Laboureur–Sude (Germany)	1–2	(Italy) Menegatti–Giombini	18–21	21–18	6–15	45–54	
17 Jul	19:45	Laboureur–Sude (Germany)	2–0	(Spain) Fernández–Baquerizo	21–19	21–19		42–38	
17 Jul	20:30	Kołosińska–Kociołek (Poland)	forfeit POL	(Italy) Menegatti–Giombini	0–21	0–21		0–42	
18 Jul	14:00	Fernández–Baquerizo (Spain)	2–0	(Italy) Menegatti–Giombini	21–15	21–17		42–32	
18 Jul	15:00	Laboureur–Sude (Germany)	forfeit POL	(Poland) Kołosińska–Kociołek	21–0	21–0		42–0	

==== Pool B ====
Pos	Team	Pld	W	L	Pts	SW	SL	SR	SPW	SPL	SPR	Qualification
1	(Netherlands) Keizer–Meppelink	3	2	1	5	5	2	2.500	138	117	1.179	Round of 16
2	(Czech Republic) Hermannová–Sluková	3	2	1	5	4	3	1.333	129	117	1.103	Round of 24
3	(France) Jupiter–Chamereau	3	1	2	4	3	6	0.500	134	152	0.882	Round of 24
4	(Slovakia) Štrbová–Dubovcová	3	1	2	4	2	4	0.500	102	117	0.872	

Date	Time		Score		Set 1	Set 2	Set 3	Total	Report
17 Jul	19:45	Keizer–Meppelink (Netherlands)	2–0	(Slovakia) Štrbová–Dubovcová	21–18	21–14		42–32	
17 Jul	20:35	Hermannová–Sluková (Czech Republic)	2–1	(France) Jupiter–Chamereau	20–22	21–15	15–10	56–47	
18 Jul	12:00	Hermannová–Sluková (Czech Republic)	2–0	(Slovakia) Štrbová–Dubovcová	21–19	21–9		42–28	
18 Jul	13:00	Keizer–Meppelink (Netherlands)	1–2	(France) Jupiter–Chamereau	19–21	21–17	14–16	54–54	
18 Jul	17:30	Štrbová–Dubovcová (Slovakia)	2–0	(France) Jupiter–Chamereau	21–15	21–18		42–33	
18 Jul	18:30	Hermannová–Sluková (Czech Republic)	0–2	(Netherlands) Keizer–Meppelink	15–21	16–21		31–42	

==== Pool C ====
Pos	Team	Pld	W	L	Pts	SW	SL	SR	SPW	SPL	SPR	Qualification
1	(Netherlands) Sinnema–Bloem	3	3	0	6	6	0	MAX	127	91	1.396	Round of 16
2	(Ukraine) Davidova–Shchypkova	3	2	1	5	4	2	2.000	108	103	1.049	Round of 24
3	(Switzerland) Z. Vergé-Dépré–A. Vergé-Dépré	3	1	2	4	2	4	0.500	107	111	0.964	Round of 24
4	(Switzerland) Eiholzer–Steinemann	3	0	3	3	0	6	0.000	90	127	0.709	

Date	Time		Score		Set 1	Set 2	Set 3	Total	Report
17 Jul	14:00	Z. Vergé-Dépré–A. Vergé-Dépré (Switzerland)	2—0	(Switzerland) Eiholzer–Steinemann	21–10	21–17		42–27	
17 Jul	18:30	Davidova–Shchypkova (Ukraine)	0–2	(Netherlands) Sinnema–Bloem	13–21	11–21		24–42	
18 Jul	12:00	Z. Vergé-Dépré–A. Vergé-Dépré (Switzerland)	0–2	(Netherlands) Sinnema–Bloem	14–21	17–21		33–42	
18 Jul	13:00	Davidova–Shchypkova (Ukraine)	2–0	(Switzerland) Eiholzer–Steinemann	21–15	21–12		42–27	
18 Jul	17:30	Sinnema–Bloem (Netherlands)	2–0	(Switzerland) Eiholzer–Steinemann	22–20	21–16		43–36	
18 Jul	18:30	Z. Vergé-Dépré–A. Vergé-Dépré (Switzerland)	0–2	(Ukraine) Davidova–Shchypkova	16–21	18–21		34–42	

==== Pool D ====
Pos	Team	Pld	W	L	Pts	SW	SL	SR	SPW	SPL	SPR	Qualification
1	(Germany) Bieneck–Schneider	3	3	0	6	6	1	6.000	140	110	1.273	Round of 16
2	(Finland) Lahti-Liukkonen–Parkkinen	3	1	2	4	3	4	0.750	125	126	0.992	Round of 24
3	(Netherlands) Van Gestel–Wesselink	3	1	2	4	2	5	0.400	117	135	0.867	Round of 24
4	(Latvia) Kravčenoka–Graudina	3	1	2	4	3	4	0.750	121	132	0.917	

Date	Time		Score		Set 1	Set 2	Set 3	Total	Report
17 Jul	14:00	Lahti-Liukkonen–Parkkinen (Finland)	2–0	(Latvia) Kravčenoka–Graudina	21–18	21–11		42–29	
17 Jul	17:30	Bieneck–Schneider (Germany)	2–0	(Netherlands) Van Gestel–Wesselink	21–18	21–10		42–28	
18 Jul	12:00	Lahti-Liukkonen–Parkkinen (Finland)	1–2	(Netherlands) Van Gestel–Wesselink	21–19	19–21	11–15	51–55	
18 Jul	13:00	Bieneck–Schneider (Germany)	2–1	(Latvia) Kravčenoka–Graudina	23–21	18–21	15–8	59–50	
18 Jul	17:30	Kravčenoka–Graudina (Latvia)	2–0	(Netherlands) Van Gestel–Wesselink	21–16	21–18		42–34	
18 Jul	18:30	Bieneck–Schneider (Germany)	2–0	(Finland) Lahti-Liukkonen–Parkkinen	21–17	21–15		42–32	

==== Pool E ====
Pos	Team	Pld	W	L	Pts	SW	SL	SR	SPW	SPL	SPR	Qualification
1	(Switzerland) Betschart–Hüberli	3	3	0	6	6	1	6.000	141	115	1.226	Round of 16
2	(Spain) Lobato–Fernández	3	2	1	5	4	3	1.333	132	124	1.065	Round of 24
3	(Austria) Schützenhöfer–Plesiutschnig	3	1	2	4	3	5	0.600	132	149	0.886	Round of 24
4	(Switzerland) Caluori–Gerson	3	0	3	3	2	6	0.333	135	152	0.888	

Date	Time		Score		Set 1	Set 2	Set 3	Total	Report
17 Jul	12:00	Betschart–Hüberli (Switzerland)	2–0	(Switzerland) Caluori–Gerson	21–19	21–15		42–34	
17 Jul	13:00	Schützenhöfer–Plesiutschnig (Austria)	0–2	(Spain) Lobato–Fernández	16–21	15–21		31–42	
17 Jul	19:30	Schützenhöfer–Plesiutschnig (Austria)	2–1	(Switzerland) Caluori–Gerson	21–15	17–21	16–14	54–50	
17 Jul	20:30	Betschart–Hüberli (Switzerland)	2–0	(Spain) Lobato–Fernández	21–15	21–19		42–34	
18 Jul	14:00	Betschart–Hüberli (Switzerland)	2–1	(Austria) Schützenhöfer–Plesiutschnig	21–23	21–16	15–8	57–47	
18 Jul	15:00	Caluori–Gerson (Switzerland)	1–2	(Spain) Lobato–Fernández	20–22	21–19	10–15	51–56	

==== Pool F ====
Pos	Team	Pld	W	L	Pts	SW	SL	SR	SPW	SPL	SPR	Qualification
1	(Finland) Lehtonen–Ahtiainen	3	3	0	6	6	2	3.000	144	131	1.099	Round of 16
2	(Czech Republic) Kolocová–Kvapilová	3	2	1	5	5	2	2.500	136	99	1.374	Round of 24
3	(Poland) Gruszczyńska–Gromadowska	3	1	2	4	3	5	0.600	123	150	0.820	Round of 24
4	(Russia) Dabizha–Mastikova	3	0	3	3	1	6	0.167	114	137	0.832	

Date	Time		Score		Set 1	Set 2	Set 3	Total	Report
17 Jul	12:00	Kolocová–Kvapilová (Czech Republic)	2–0	(Poland) Gruszczyńska–Gromadowska	21–10	21–14		42–24	
17 Jul	13:00	Lehtonen–Ahtiainen (Finland)	2–0	(Russia) Dabizha–Mastikova	21–14	21–19		42–33	
17 Jul	19:30	Lehtonen–Ahtiainen (Finland)	2–1	(Poland) Gruszczyńska–Gromadowska	21–15	18–21	15–10	54–46	
17 Jul	20:30	Kolocová–Kvapilová (Czech Republic)	2–0	(Russia) Dabizha–Mastikova	21–15	21–12		42–27	
18 Jul	14:00	Dabizha–Mastikova (Russia)	1–2	(Poland) Gruszczyńska–Gromadowska	18–21	21–15	15–17	54–53	
18 Jul	15:00	Kolocová–Kvapilová (Czech Republic)	1–2	(Finland) Lehtonen–Ahtiainen	21–12	19–21	12–15	52–48	

==== Pool G ====
Pos	Team	Pld	W	L	Pts	SW	SL	SR	SPW	SPL	SPR	Qualification
1	(Germany) Behrens–Ittlinger	3	2	1	5	4	3	1.333	133	124	1.073	Round of 16
2	(Germany) Borger–Kozuch	3	2	1	5	5	2	2.500	130	116	1.121	Round of 24
3	(Russia) Ukolova–Birlova	3	2	1	5	4	4	1.000	142	131	1.084	Round of 24
4	(Norway) Ulveseth–Lunde	3	0	3	3	2	6	0.333	119	153	0.778	

Date	Time		Score		Set 1	Set 2	Set 3	Total	Report
17 Jul	12:00	Borger–Kozuch (Germany)	2–0	(Norway) Ulveseth–Lunde	21–19	21–16		42–35	
17 Jul	13:00	Ulveseth–Lunde (Norway)	1–2	(Russia) Ukolova–Birlova	9–21	21–19	13–15	43–55	
17 Jul	17:30	Behrens–Ittlinger (Germany)	2–1	(Norway) Ulveseth–Lunde	21–14	20–22	15–13	56–49	
17 Jul	18:30	Borger–Kozuch (Germany)	1–2	(Russia) Ukolova–Birlova	14–21	21–18	11–15	46–54	
18 Jul	14:00	Behrens–Ittlinger (Germany)	2–0	(Russia) Ukolova–Birlova	21–19	21–14		42–33	
18 Jul	15:00	Borger–Kozuch (Germany)	2–0	(Norway) Ulveseth–Lunde	21–15	21–12		42–27	

==== Pool H ====
Pos	Team	Pld	W	L	Pts	SW	SL	SR	SPW	SPL	SPR	Qualification
1	(Netherlands) Stubbe–Ramond-van Iersel	3	3	0	6	6	0	MAX	126	102	1.235	Round of 16
2	(Czech Republic) Bonnerová–Nakládalová	3	2	1	5	4	3	1.333	133	127	1.047	Round of 24
3	(Russia) Kholomina–Makroguzova	3	1	2	4	3	2	1.500	122	114	1.070	Round of 24
4	(Russia) Bocharova–Voronina	3	0	3	3	0	6	0.000	89	127	0.701	

Date	Time		Score		Set 1	Set 2	Set 3	Total	Report
17 Jul	14:00	Kholomina–Makroguzova (Russia)	2–0	(Russia) Bocharova–Voronina	21–8	21–18		42–26	
17 Jul	17:30	Stubbe–Ramond-van Iersel (Netherlands)	2–0	(Czech Republic) Bonnerová–Nakládalová	21–18	21–18		42–36	
18 Jul	12:00	Kholomina–Makroguzova (Russia)	1–2	(Czech Republic) Bonnerová–Nakládalová	15–21	21–18	12–15	48–54	
18 Jul	13:00	Stubbe–Ramond-van Iersel (Netherlands)	2–0	(Russia) Bocharova–Voronina	21–17	21–17		42–34	
18 Jul	17:30	Bocharova–Voronina (Russia)	0–2	(Czech Republic) Bonnerová–Nakládalová	20–22	17–21		37–43	
18 Jul	18:30	Stubbe–Ramond-van Iersel (Netherlands)	2–0	(Russia) Kholomina–Makroguzova	21–18	21–14		42–32	

=== Knockout stage ===
A draw will be held to determine the pairings.

==== Round of 24 ====
Date	Time		Score		Set 1	Set 2	Set 3	Total	Report
19 Jul	14:00	Menegatti–Giombini (Italy)	0–2	(Switzerland) Z. Vergé-Dépré–A. Vergé-Dépré	16–21	18–21		34–42	
19 Jul	15:00	Lobato–Fernández (Spain)	2–0	(France) Jupiter–Chamereau	21–15	21–14		42–29	
19 Jul	15:00	Hermannová–Sluková (Czech Republic)	2–0	(Russia) Kholomina–Makroguzova	21–17	36–34		57–51	
19 Jul	14:00	Kolocová–Kvapilová (Czech Republic)	0–2	(Russia) Ukolova–Birlova	11–21	19–21		30–42	
19 Jul	15:00	Davidova–Shchypkova (Ukraine)	2–0	(Poland) Gruszczyńska–Gromadowska	21–16	27–25		48–41	
19 Jul	14:00	Borger–Kozuch (Germany)	2–0	(Netherlands) Van Gestel–Wesselink	27–25	21–15		48–40	
19 Jul	14:00	Lahti-Liukkonen–Parkkinen (Finland)	0–2	(Germany) Laboureur–Sude	22–24	20–22		42–46	
19 Jul	15:00	Bonnerová–Nakládalová (Czech Republic)	2–1	(Austria) Schützenhöfer–Plesiutschnig	23–21	18–21	15–11	56–53	

==== Round of 16 ====
Date	Time		Score		Set 1	Set 2	Set 3	Total	Report
19 Jul	19:30	Keizer–Meppelink (Netherlands)	2–0	(Switzerland) Z. Vergé-Dépré–A. Vergé-Dépré	21–16	21–14		42–30	
19 Jul	20:30	Behrens–Ittlinger (Germany)	0–2	(Spain) Lobato–Fernández	17–21	17–21		34–42	
19 Jul	20:30	Lehtonen–Ahtiainen (Finland)	0–2	(Czech Republic) Hermannová–Sluková	10–21	11–21		21–42	
19 Jul	19:30	Sinnema–Bloem (Netherlands)	1–2	(Russia) Ukolova–Birlova	18–21	21–18	8–15	47–54	
19 Jul	20:30	Bieneck–Schneider (Germany)	2–0	(Ukraine) Davidova–Shchypkova	21–17	21–19		42–36	
19 Jul	19:30	Betschart–Hüberli (Switzerland)	2–1	(Germany) Borger–Kozuch	18–21	21–16	15–9	54–43	
19 Jul	19:30	Stubbe–Ramond-van Iersel (Netherlands)	0–2	(Germany) Laboureur–Sude	20–22	25–27		45–49	
19 Jul	20:30	Fernández – Baquerizo (Spain)	2–0	(Czech Republic) Bonnerová–Nakládalová	21–14	21–13		42–27	

==== Quarterfinals ====
Date	Time		Score		Set 1	Set 2	Set 3	Total	Report
20 Jul	19:45	Lobato–Fernández (Spain)	0–2	(Netherlands) Keizer–Meppelink	10–21	17–21		27–42	
20 Jul	18:30	Ukolova–Birlova (Russia)	0–2	(Czech Republic) Hermannová–Sluková	13–21	17–21		30–42	
20 Jul	20:35	Betschart–Hüberli (Switzerland)	2–1	(Germany) Bieneck–Schneider	18–21	21–11	15–12	54–44	
20 Jul	20:35	Fernández – Baquerizo (Spain)	2–1	(Germany) Laboureur–Sude	21–23	22–20	15–10	58–53	

==== Semifinals ====
Date	Time		Score		Set 1	Set 2	Set 3	Total	Report
21 Jul	16:00	Hermannová–Sluková (Czech Republic)	1–2	(Netherlands) Keizer–Meppelink	22–20	17–21	12–15	51–56	
21 Jul	15:00	Fernández – Baquerizo (Spain)	1–2	(Switzerland) Betschart–Hüberli	21–14	21–23	13–15	55–42	

==== Third place game ====
Date	Time		Score		Set 1	Set 2	Set 3	Total	Report
21 Jul	18:30	Fernández – Baquerizo (Spain)	Forfeit ESP	(Czech Republic) Hermannová–Sluková	–	–		–	

==== Final ====
Date	Time		Score		Set 1	Set 2	Set 3	Total	Report
21 Jul	19:45	Betschart–Hüberli (Switzerland)	0–2	(Netherlands) Keizer–Meppelink	16–21	24–26		40–47	
