= Beach volleyball at the 2020 Summer Olympics – Men's qualification =

The qualification for the 2020 men's Olympic beach volleyball tournament allocated quota places to 24 teams. A maximum of two teams per country are allowed to qualify. The 2020 Olympics were postponed to 2021 due to the COVID-19 pandemic.

== Qualification summary ==
Means of qualification	Date	Venue	Vacancies	Qualified
Host nation	—	—	1	Japan
2019 World Championships	28 June – 7 July 2019	(Germany) Hamburg	1	ROC
2019 FIVB Olympic Qualification Tournament	18–22 September 2019	(China) Haiyang	2	Italy
2019 FIVB Olympic Qualification Tournament	18–22 September 2019	(China) Haiyang	2	Latvia
FIVB Beach Volleyball Olympic Ranking	13 June 2021	(Switzerland) Lausanne	15	Norway
FIVB Beach Volleyball Olympic Ranking	13 June 2021	(Switzerland) Lausanne	15	Qatar
FIVB Beach Volleyball Olympic Ranking	13 June 2021	(Switzerland) Lausanne	15	Brazil
FIVB Beach Volleyball Olympic Ranking	13 June 2021	(Switzerland) Lausanne	15	Poland
FIVB Beach Volleyball Olympic Ranking	13 June 2021	(Switzerland) Lausanne	15	Netherlands
FIVB Beach Volleyball Olympic Ranking	13 June 2021	(Switzerland) Lausanne	15	Brazil
FIVB Beach Volleyball Olympic Ranking	13 June 2021	(Switzerland) Lausanne	15	Germany
FIVB Beach Volleyball Olympic Ranking	13 June 2021	(Switzerland) Lausanne	15	ROC
FIVB Beach Volleyball Olympic Ranking	13 June 2021	(Switzerland) Lausanne	15	Czech Republic
FIVB Beach Volleyball Olympic Ranking	13 June 2021	(Switzerland) Lausanne	15	United States
FIVB Beach Volleyball Olympic Ranking	13 June 2021	(Switzerland) Lausanne	15	United States
FIVB Beach Volleyball Olympic Ranking	13 June 2021	(Switzerland) Lausanne	15	Spain
FIVB Beach Volleyball Olympic Ranking	13 June 2021	(Switzerland) Lausanne	15	Poland
FIVB Beach Volleyball Olympic Ranking	13 June 2021	(Switzerland) Lausanne	15	Italy
FIVB Beach Volleyball Olympic Ranking	13 June 2021	(Switzerland) Lausanne	15	Chile
2018–2020 CEV Continental Cup Final	23–26 June 2021	(Netherlands) The Hague	1	Switzerland
2018–2020 AVC Continental Cup Final	25–27 June 2021	(Thailand) Nakhon Pathom	1	Australia
2018–2020 CAVB Continental Cup Final	25–27 June 2021	(Morocco) Agadir	1	Morocco
2018–2020 NORCECA Continental Cup Final	25–27 June 2021	(Mexico) Colima	1	Mexico
2018–2020 CSV Continental Cup Final	26–27 June 2021	(Chile) Santiago	1	Argentina
Total			24	

== Host country ==
FIVB reserved a vacancy for the Olympics host country to participate in the tournament.

- Japan

== FIVB Beach Volleyball Olympic Qualification Tournament ==
The top two teams from the FIVB Beach Volleyball Olympic Qualification Tournament qualified.

== World Championships ==
One team qualified from the 2019 World Championships.

== Ranking ==
15 teams qualified from the Olympic Ranking.

Top 25 Rankings as of June 13, 2021
Rank	Pair	Points	Qualified	Comment
1				
2				
3				
4				
5				
6				
7				
8				
9				
10				
11				
12				
13				
14				
15				
16				
17				
18				
19				
20				
21				
22				
23				
24				
25				

== Continental Cup ==
One winner from each Continental Cup qualified for the Olympics.
