= 2018–2020 NORCECA Beach Volleyball Continental Cup =

The 2018–2020 NORCECA Beach Volleyball Continental Cup were a beach volleyball double-gender event. NORCEA is the North, Central America and Caribbean Volleyball Confederation. The winners of the event qualified for the 2020 Summer Olympics.

== Aguascalientes Tournament ==
Men's Final Standings

Rank	Pair	Points	Qualified	Comment
1	(United States) Crabb–Bourne	200		
2	(Mexico) Virgen–Ontiveros	180		
3	(Cuba) González–Reyes	160		
4	(Guatemala) Blanco–García L.	140		
5	(Nicaragua) Mora–López	120		
6	(Canada) Hoey–MacNeil	120		
7	(Costa Rica) Valenciano–Quintero	110		
8	(United States) Slick–Allen	110		
9	(Mexico) Sarabia–Stephens	100		
10	(Trinidad and Tobago) Williams–Theodore	100		
11	(Canada) Gyemi–Bouchard	100		
12	(El Salvador) Tato–Pepe	100		
13	(Belize) Hauze–Jenkins	90		
14	(Canada) Santamaria–Parham	90		
15	(United States Virgin Islands) Austin–Field	90		
16	(Saint Kitts and Nevis) Penny–Seabrookes	90		

Women's Final Standings

Rank	Pair	Points	Qualified	Comment
1	(Cuba) Mailen–Leila	200		
2	(United States) Dowdy–Quiggle	180		
3	(United States) Fonoimoana–Martin	160		
4	(Mexico) Valdez Lizarraga–Quintero	140		
5	(Canada) Gordon–Marcelle	120		
6	(Costa Rica) Valenciano–Araya	120		
7	(Mexico) Orellana–Revuelta	110		
8	(Curaçao) Tolentino–Anthony	110		
9	(El Salvador) Vasquez–Vargas	100		
10	(Guatemala) Alvarado–Bethancourt	100		
11	(Nicaragua) Mendoza–Lolette	100		
12	(Cayman Islands) Wolfenden–Harrison	100		
13	(Canada) Dunn-Suen–Cruickshank	90		
14	(United States Virgin Islands) Valenciana–Bennett	90		
15	(Saint Kitts and Nevis) Allen Edinborough–Dyer	90		
16	(Trinidad and Tobago) Joseph–Davidson	90		

== Cayman Islands Tournament ==
Men's Final Standings

Rank	Pair	Points	Qualified	Comment
1	(Mexico) Virgen–Ontiveros	200		
2	(Cuba) González–Reyes	180		
3	(Nicaragua) Mora–López	160		
4	(United States) Vaught–Sauter	140		
5	(Canada) Reka–Fecteau-Boutin	120		
6	(Guatemala) Blanco–García L.	120		
7	(United States Virgin Islands) Kwasny–Ospina	110		
8	(Dominican Republic) Castillo–Medina	110		
9	(Canada) MacNeil–Hoey	100		
10	(Cayman Islands) Santamaria–Parham	100		
11	(El Salvador) Tato–Pepe	100		
12	(Trinidad and Tobago) Williams–Theodore	100		
13	(The Bahamas) Wilson–Isaacs	90		
14	(Costa Rica) Quintero–Valenciano	90		
15	(United States Virgin Islands) Lomeli–Pippen	90		
16	(Jamaica) Simpson–Walters	90		
17	(Cayman Islands) Campbell–Dack	80		
18	(Saint Kitts and Nevis) Penny–Seabrookes	80		

Women's Final Standings

Rank	Pair	Points	Qualified	Comment
1	(Cuba) Mailen–Leila	200		
2	(United States) Hochevar–Wopat	180		
3	(United States) Martin–Fonoimoana	160		
4	(Mexico) Orellana–Revuelta	140		
5	(Canada) May–Lenarduzzi	120		
6	(Costa Rica) Valenciano–Araya	120		
7	(El Salvador) Vásquez–Vargas	110		
8	(Nicaragua) Mendoza–ELIA	110		
9	(Cayman Islands) Wolfenden–Gandolfi	100		
10	(Guatemala) Alvarado–Bethancourt	100		
11	(Curaçao) Tolentino–Anthony	100		
12	(Canada) Dunn-Suen–Cruickshank	100		
13	(Cayman Islands) Harrison–Powery	90		
14	(United States Virgin Islands) Valenciana–Vitt	90		
15	(Saint Kitts and Nevis) Allen Edinborough–Dyer	90		
16	(Trinidad and Tobago) Joseph–Davidson	90		
17	(United States Virgin Islands) Bennett–Dietrich	80		
18	(Jamaica) Smith–Wright	80		

== Nicaragua Tournament ==
Men's Final Standings

Rank	Pair	Points	Qualified	Comment
1	(Cuba) González–Reyes	200		
2	(Guatemala) Blanco–García L.	180		
3	(Trinidad and Tobago) Waldo–Stewart	160		
4	(Nicaragua) López–Contreras	140		
5	(Canada) MacNeil–Hoey	120		
6	(Canada) Reka–Fecteau-Boutin	120		
7	(Nicaragua) Mora–López	110		
8	(Dominican Republic) Castillo–Medina	110		
9	(United States) Brewster–Boag	100		
10	(Costa Rica) Smith–Alpízar	100		
11	(Puerto Rico) Quinones–López	100		
12	(El Salvador) Tato–Pepe	100		
13	(The Bahamas) Isaacs–Wilmott	90		
14	(Belize) Martinez–Carnegie	90		
15	(El Salvador) Flores–Ávalos	90		
16	(Guatemala) Aragón–Garrido	90		

Women's Final Standings

Rank	Pair	Points	Qualified	Comment
1	(Cuba) Mailen–Leila	200		
2	(Nicaragua) López–Lolette	180		
3	(El Salvador) Vásquez–Vargas	160		
4	(United States) Melville–Fuller	140		
5	(Canada) Dunn-Suen–Cruickshank	120		
6	(Canada) May–Lenarduzzi	120		
7	(Mexico) Cruz–Burnside	110		
8	(Costa Rica) Quesada–Ramírez	110		
9	(United States Virgin Islands) Csaszi–Valenciana	100		
10	(Guatemala) Alvarado–Bethancourt	100		
11	(Costa Rica) Valenciano–C. Villegas	100		
12	(Trinidad and Tobago) Chase–Davidson	100		
13	(Guatemala) Quiñonez–Guillermo	90		
14	(Nicaragua) Lugo–Alonso	90		
15	(Nicaragua) Mendoza–Machado	90		

== Varadero Tournament ==
Men's Final Standings

Rank	Pair	Points	Qualified	Comment
1	(Cuba) González–Reyes	200		
2	(Nicaragua) Mora–López	180		
3	(Cuba) Carrasco–Piña	160		
4	(United States) Field–Loomis	140		
5	(United States) Zaun–Satterfield	120		
6	(Puerto Rico) Rivera–López	120		
7	(Guatemala) Blanco–García L.	110		
8	(Canada) Burlacu–Kopp	110		
9	(Canada) Reka–Fecteau-Boutin	100		
10	(Costa Rica) Smith–Valenciano	100		
11	(Trinidad and Tobago) Waldo–Stewart	100		
12	(Panama) Gonzalez–Quintero	100		
13	(The Bahamas) Isaacs–Wilson	90		
14	(Belize) Codd–Nuñez	90		
15	(Dominican Republic) Castillo–Medina	90		
16	(El Salvador) Tato–Pepe	90		
17	(United States Virgin Islands) López–Lake	90		

Women's Final Standings

Rank	Pair	Points	Qualified	Comment
1	(Cuba) Mailen–Leila	200		
2	(United States) Fonoimoana–Martin	180		
3	(Cuba) Sánchez–Lidy	160		
4	(Canada) Dunn-Suen–Cruickshank	140		
5	(United States) Ledoux–Urango	120		
6	(Puerto Rico) Navas–González	120		
7	(El Salvador) Vásquez–Vargas	110		
8	(Canada) May–Lenarduzzi	110		
9	(Costa Rica) Quesada–Ramírez	100		
10	(Nicaragua) Elia–Rodríguez	100		
11	(Trinidad and Tobago) Rheeza–Davidson	100		
12	(Guatemala) Alvarado–Bethancourt	100		
13	(Cayman Islands) Gandolfi–Powery	90		
14	(United States Virgin Islands) Charles–Buckner	90		
15	(Jamaica) Smith–Wright	90		
16	(Martinique) Carole–Cristelle	90		

== La Paz Tournament ==
Men's Final Standings

Rank	Pair	Points	Qualified	Comment
1	(Mexico) Sarabia–Stephens	200		
2	(United States) Friend–Mewhirter	180		
3	(Guatemala) Leonardo–García L.	160		
4	(Canada) Donovan–Kazhamiaka	140		
5	(Nicaragua) Mora–López	120		
6	(Costa Rica) Valenciano–Quintero	120		
7	(Belize) Codd–Hauze	110		
8	(Mexico) Alcázar–Tamayo	110		
9	(Mexico) Cárdenas–Espinoza	100		
10	(Canada) Kopp–Burlacu	100		
11	(El Salvador) Tato–Pepe	100		
12	(Cayman Islands) Campbell–Dack	100		
13	(The Bahamas) Isaacs–Petit	90		
14	(United States Virgin Islands) Lake–López	90		
15	(Saint Kitts and Nevis) Seabrookes–Rebels	90		

Women's Final Standings

Rank	Pair	Points	Qualified	Comment
1	(Canada) May–Dunn	200		
2	(Mexico) Valdez Lizárraga–Quintero	180		
3	(Mexico) Burnside–Cruz	160		
4	(United States) Newberry–Brennan	140		
5	(Mexico) Ríos–Santoyo	120		
6	(Canada) Fletcher–Thorup	120		
7	(Nicaragua) López–Lolette	110		
8	(United States Virgin Islands) Valenciana–Almeida-Anz	110		
9	(El Salvador) Vásquez–Vargas	100		
10	(Cayman Islands) Cristin–Smith-Johnson	100		

== Punta Cana Tournament ==
Men's Final Standings

Rank	Pair	Points	Qualified	Comment
1	(Nicaragua) Mora–López	200		
2	(Mexico) Rubio–Gaxiola	180		
3	(Canada) MacNeil–Kopp	160		
4	(United States) Joyner–Boag	140		
5	(Trinidad and Tobago) Williams–Theodore	120		
6	(Saint Lucia) Gillan–Matlo	120		
7	(Martinique) Brice–Bosqui	110		
8	(The Bahamas) Isaacs–Wilmott	110		
9	(Dominican Republic) Medina–Sarmiento	100		
10	(Saint Lucia) Germaine–Tevin	100		
11	(Saint Vincent and the Grenadines) Delshun–Daryl	100		
12	(Dominican Republic) Espinal–López	100		
13	Vanterpool–Anguilla	90		
14	(Saint Vincent and the Grenadines) Franklyn–Franklyn	90		

Women's Final Standings

Rank	Pair	Points	Qualified	Comment
1	(United States) Hartong–Urango	200		
2	(Canada) McBain–Tresham	180		
3	(Mexico) Orellana–Revuelta	160		
4	(Puerto Rico) González–Torres	140		
5	(Guatemala) Bethancourt–Girón N.	120		
6	(Nicaragua) Mendoza–Rodríguez	120		
7	(Trinidad and Tobago) Rheeza–Davidson	110		
8	(Curaçao) Savonije–Tolentino	110		
9	(United States Virgin Islands) Bennett–Valenciana	100		
10	(Dominican Republic) De La Cruz–Payano	100		
11	(Anguilla) Leveret–Gumbs	100		

== Bonaire Tournament ==
Men's Final Standings

Rank	Pair	Points	Qualified	Comment
1	(Mexico) Rubio–Gaxiola	200		
2	(United States) Johnson–Austin	180		
3	(United States) Friend–Mewhirter	160		
4	(Canada) Fecteau-Boutin–Reka	140		
5	(Nicaragua) Mora–López	120		
6	(El Salvador) Flores–Pepe	120		
7	(Trinidad and Tobago) Williams–Waldo	110		
8	(Saint Kitts and Nevis) Penny–Seabrookes	110		
9	(United States Virgin Islands) Kwasny–Ospina	100		
10	(Aruba) Fransua–Toro	100		
11	(Curaçao) Nayo–Meulens	100		
12	(Bonaire) Morales Monsalve–Winklaar	100		
13	(Bonaire) Prudencia–Saragoza	90		

Women's Final Standings

Rank	Pair	Points	Qualified	Comment
1	(United States) Davis–Wheeler	200		
2	(Mexico) Orellana–Revuelta	180		
3	(Guatemala) Bethancourth–N. Giron	160		
4	(Canada) Cowley–Dormann	140		
5	(United States) Fuchs–Fuller	120		
6	(Nicaragua) Lolette–Mendoza	120		
7	(Trinidad and Tobago) Davidson–Rheeza	110		
8	(El Salvador) Vásquez–Vargas	110		
9	(Canada) Visscher–Wolf	100		
10	(Curaçao) Tolentino–Savonije	100		
11	(Aruba) Toussaint–Rafini	100		
12	(Bonaire) Lorini–Verolme	100		

== Boca Chica Tournament ==
Men's Final Standings

Rank	Pair	Points	Qualified	Comment
1	(United States) Gibb–Ta. Crabb	600		
2	(Canada) Pedlow–Schachter	540		
3	(United States) Doherty–Evans	480		
4	(Canada) Fecteau-Boutin–O'Gorman	420		
5	(Puerto Rico) Encarnación–Ribas	360		
6	(Mexico) Rubio–Gaxiola	346		
7	(Nicaragua) López–Contreras	330		
8	(Mexico) Ontiveros–Virgen	316		
9	(Dominican Republic) Medina–Perez	300		
10	(Guatemala) Leonardo–L. García	292		
11	(Dominican Republic) Espinal–Sarmiento	286		
12	(Saint Kitts and Nevis) Penny–Seabrookes	278		
13	(The Bahamas) Isaacs–Wilmott	270		
14	(Martinique) Privat–Lefaivre	270		
15	(Trinidad and Tobago) Tevin–Thomas	270		

Women's Final Standings

Rank	Pair	Points	Qualified	Comment
1	(United States) Sweat–Walsh Jennings	600		
2	(Cuba) Sánchez–Lidy	540		
3	(United States) Stockman–Larsen	480		
4	(Canada) Nicole–Megan	420		
5	(Canada) Bukovec–Pischke	360		
6	(Mexico) Orellana–Revuelta	346		
7	(Puerto Rico) González–Torres	330		
8	(Nicaragua) Lolette–Mendoza	316		
9	(Guatemala) Bethancourth–N. Giron	300		
10	(Curaçao) Tolentino–Savonije	292		
11	(Trinidad and Tobago) Abby–Chase	286		
12	(United States Virgin Islands) Valenciana–Nutterfield	278		
13	(Costa Rica) Valenciano–Quesada	270		
14	(Dominican Republic) De La Cruz–Payano	270		
15	(Saint Lucia) Jamilla–Emmanuel	270		
16	(Saint Lucia) Neptune–Noel	270		
17	(Antigua and Barbuda) Payne–Thomas	240		
18	(Antigua and Barbuda) Rosie–Peters	240		

== Hato Mayor del Rey Tournament ==
Men's Final Standings

Rank	Pair	Points	Qualified	Comment
1	(United States) Casebeer–Schalk	200		
2	(Canada) Fecteau-Boutin–MacNeil	180		
3	(Nicaragua) Mora–López	160		
4	(United States) Brewster–Ferrari	140		
5	(Puerto Rico) Rodríguez–Encarnación	120		
6	(Costa Rica) B. Duarte–Valenciano	120		
7	(Canada) Grabovskyy–Towe	110		
8	(El Salvador) Tato–Vargas	110		
9	(Dominican Republic) Espinal–Medina	100		
10	(Belize) Hauze–Jenkins	100		
11	(Dominican Republic) Sarmiento–Perez	100		
12	(Martinique) Lefaivre–Brice	100		
13	(Trinidad and Tobago) Waldo–Thomas	90		

Women's Final Standings

Rank	Pair	Points	Qualified	Comment
1	(United States) Quiggle–Fonoimoana	200		
2	(Cuba) Sánchez–Lidy	180		
3	(Canada) Nash–Poletto	160		
4	(Costa Rica) M. Quesada–K. Quesada	180		
5	(Puerto Rico) González–Torres	120		
6	(Dominican Republic) Payano–De La Cruz	120		
7	(Nicaragua) Mendoza–Lolette	110		
8	(United States Virgin Islands) Valenciana–Nutterfield	110		
9	(El Salvador) Vásquez–Vargas	100		
10	(Belize) Sabal–Balderamos	100		
11	(Canada) Lenarduzzi–Dunn-Suen	100		
12	(Trinidad and Tobago) Chase–Joseph	100		
13	(Dominican Republic) Bethancourt–Amparo	90		
14	(Martinique) Cristelle–Carole	90		

== Final Men's Standings ==
#	(Mexico) Aguascalientes		Cayman Islands		Nicaragua		(Cuba) Varadero		(Mexico) La Paz		(Dominican Republic) Punta Cana		Bonaire		(Dominican Republic) Boca Chica		(Dominican Republic) Hato Mayor del Rey		(Jamaica) Ocho Rios		Total	
#	Team	Points	Team	Points	Team	Points	Team	Points	Team	Points	Team	Points	Team	Points	Team	Points	Team	Points	Team	Points	Team	Points
1	United States	200	United States	140	United States	80	United States	160	United States	180	United States	140	United States	180	United States	200	United States	200	United States	200	United States	1680
2	Nicaragua	110	Nicaragua	160	Nicaragua	140	Nicaragua	180	Nicaragua	110	Nicaragua	200	Nicaragua	140	Nicaragua	110	Nicaragua	160	Nicaragua	180	Nicaragua	1490
3	Canada	100	Canada	110	Canada	110	Canada	100	Canada	140	Canada	160	Canada	160	Canada	180	Canada	180	Canada	160	Canada	1400
4	Mexico	180	Mexico	200	Mexico		Mexico		Mexico	200	Mexico	180	Mexico	200	Mexico	140	Mexico		Mexico		Mexico	1100
5	Guatemala	140	Guatemala	100	Guatemala	180	Guatemala	110	Guatemala	160	Guatemala		Guatemala		Guatemala	80	Guatemala		Guatemala	80	Guatemala	850
6	Cuba	160	Cuba	180	Cuba	200	Cuba	200	Cuba		Cuba		Cuba		Cuba		Cuba		Cuba		Cuba	740
7	Trinidad and Tobago	70	Trinidad and Tobago	35	Trinidad and Tobago	160	Trinidad and Tobago	70	Trinidad and Tobago		Trinidad and Tobago	110	Trinidad and Tobago	100	Trinidad and Tobago	35	Trinidad and Tobago	45	Trinidad and Tobago	100	Trinidad and Tobago	725
8	Puerto Rico		Puerto Rico		Puerto Rico	55	Puerto Rico	140	Puerto Rico		Puerto Rico		Puerto Rico		Puerto Rico	160	Puerto Rico	140	Puerto Rico	140	Puerto Rico	635
9	El Salvador	55	El Salvador	45	El Salvador	45	El Salvador	15	El Salvador	70	El Salvador		El Salvador	110	El Salvador		El Salvador	100	El Salvador	55	El Salvador	495
10	Costa Rica	80	Costa Rica		Costa Rica	70	Costa Rica	80	Costa Rica	100	Costa Rica		Costa Rica		Costa Rica		Costa Rica	110	Costa Rica	45	Costa Rica	490
11	Dominican Republic		Dominican Republic	70	Dominican Republic	100	Dominican Republic	25	Dominican Republic		Dominican Republic	55	Dominican Republic		Dominican Republic	100	Dominican Republic	80	Dominican Republic		Dominican Republic	430
12	United States Virgin Islands	45	United States Virgin Islands	80	United States Virgin Islands		United States Virgin Islands	10	United States Virgin Islands	35	United States Virgin Islands		United States Virgin Islands	70	United States Virgin Islands		United States Virgin Islands		United States Virgin Islands	70	United States Virgin Islands	310
13	Bahamas		Bahamas	15	Bahamas	35	Bahamas	45	Bahamas	45	Bahamas	70	Bahamas		Bahamas	55	Bahamas		Bahamas		Bahamas	265
14	Belize	35	Belize		Belize	25	Belize	35	Belize	80	Belize		Belize		Belize		Belize	70	Belize		Belize	245
15	Saint Kitts and Nevis	25	Saint Kitts and Nevis	10	Saint Kitts and Nevis		Saint Kitts and Nevis		Saint Kitts and Nevis	25	Saint Kitts and Nevis		Saint Kitts and Nevis	80	Saint Kitts and Nevis	70	Saint Kitts and Nevis		Saint Kitts and Nevis		Saint Kitts and Nevis	210
16	Martinique		Martinique		Martinique		Martinique		Martinique		Martinique	80	Martinique		Martinique	45	Martinique	55	Martinique		Martinique	180
17	Jamaica		Jamaica	25	Jamaica		Jamaica		Jamaica		Jamaica		Jamaica		Jamaica		Jamaica		Jamaica	110	Jamaica	135
18	Cayman Islands	15	Cayman Islands	55	Cayman Islands		Cayman Islands		Cayman Islands	55	Cayman Islands		Cayman Islands		Cayman Islands		Cayman Islands		Cayman Islands		Cayman Islands	125
19	Saint Lucia		Saint Lucia		Saint Lucia		Saint Lucia		Saint Lucia		Saint Lucia	100	Saint Lucia		Saint Lucia		Saint Lucia		Saint Lucia		Saint Lucia	100
20	Aruba		Aruba		Aruba		Aruba		Aruba		Aruba		Aruba	55	Aruba		Aruba		Aruba	35	Aruba	90
21	Panama		Panama		Panama		Panama	55	Panama		Panama		Panama		Panama		Panama		Panama		Panama	55
22	Curaçao		Curaçao		Curaçao		Curaçao		Curaçao		Curaçao		Curaçao	45	Curaçao		Curaçao		Curaçao		Curaçao	45
23	Saint Vincent and the Grenadines		Saint Vincent and the Grenadines		Saint Vincent and the Grenadines		Saint Vincent and the Grenadines		Saint Vincent and the Grenadines		Saint Vincent and the Grenadines	45	Saint Vincent and the Grenadines		Saint Vincent and the Grenadines		Saint Vincent and the Grenadines		Saint Vincent and the Grenadines		Saint Vincent and the Grenadines	45
24	Anguilla		Anguilla		Anguilla		Anguilla		Anguilla		Anguilla	35	Anguilla		Anguilla		Anguilla		Anguilla		Anguilla	35
25	Bonaire		Bonaire		Bonaire		Bonaire		Bonaire		Bonaire		Bonaire	35	Bonaire		Bonaire		Bonaire		Bonaire	35

== Final Women's Standings ==
#	(Mexico) Aguascalientes		Cayman Islands		Nicaragua		(Cuba) Varadero		(Mexico) La Paz		(Dominican Republic) Punta Cana		Bonaire		(Dominican Republic) Boca Chica		(Dominican Republic) Hato Mayor del Rey		(Jamaica) Ocho Rios		Total	
#	Team	Points	Team	Points	Team	Points	Team	Points	Team	Points	Team	Points	Team	Points	Team	Points	Team	Points	Team	Points	Team	Points
1	United States	180	United States	180	United States	140	United States	180	United States	160	United States	200	United States	200	United States	200	United States	200	United States		United States	1640
2	Canada	140	Canada	140	Canada	110	Canada	160	Canada	200	Canada	180	Canada	140	Canada	160	Canada	160	Canada		Canada	1390
3	Cuba	200	Cuba	200	Cuba	200	Cuba	200	Cuba		Cuba		Cuba		Cuba	180	Cuba	180	Cuba		Cuba	1160'
4	Mexico	160	Mexico	160	Mexico	100	Mexico		Mexico	180	Mexico	160	Mexico	180	Mexico	140	Mexico		Mexico		Mexico	'1080
5	Nicaragua	55	Nicaragua	80	Nicaragua	180	Nicaragua	80	Nicaragua	140	Nicaragua	100	Nicaragua	110	Nicaragua	100	Nicaragua	80	Nicaragua		Nicaragua	925
6	El Salvador	80	El Salvador	100	El Salvador	160	El Salvador	110	El Salvador	100	El Salvador		El Salvador	80	El Salvador		El Salvador	55	El Salvador		El Salvador	685
7	Guatemala	70	Guatemala	55	Guatemala	55	Guatemala	55	Guatemala		Guatemala	110	Guatemala	160	Guatemala	80	Guatemala		Guatemala		Guatemala	585
8	Costa Rica	110	Costa Rica	110	Costa Rica	80	Costa Rica	100	Costa Rica		Costa Rica		Costa Rica		Costa Rica	35	Costa Rica	140	Costa Rica		Costa Rica	575
9	Puerto Rico		Puerto Rico		Puerto Rico		Puerto Rico	140	Puerto Rico		Puerto Rico	140	Puerto Rico		Puerto Rico	140	Puerto Rico	110	Puerto Rico		Puerto Rico	530
10	United States Virgin Islands	35	United States Virgin Islands	25	United States Virgin Islands	70	United States Virgin Islands	35	United States Virgin Islands	110	United States Virgin Islands	55	United States Virgin Islands		United States Virgin Islands	45	United States Virgin Islands	70	United States Virgin Islands		United States Virgin Islands	445
11	Trinidad and Tobago	25	Trinidad and Tobago	15	Trinidad and Tobago	45	Trinidad and Tobago	70	Trinidad and Tobago		Trinidad and Tobago	80	Trinidad and Tobago	100	Trinidad and Tobago	55	Trinidad and Tobago	35	Trinidad and Tobago		Trinidad and Tobago	425
12	Curaçao	100	Curaçao	45	Curaçao		Curaçao		Curaçao		Curaçao	70	Curaçao	70	Curaçao	70	Curaçao		Curaçao		Curaçao	355
13	Cayman Islands	45	Cayman Islands	70	Cayman Islands		Cayman Islands	45	Cayman Islands	80	Cayman Islands		Cayman Islands		Cayman Islands		Cayman Islands		Cayman Islands		Cayman Islands	240
14	Dominican Republic		Dominican Republic		Dominican Republic		Dominican Republic		Dominican Republic		Dominican Republic	45	Dominican Republic		Dominican Republic	25	Dominican Republic	100	Dominican Republic		Dominican Republic	170
15	Aruba		Aruba		Aruba		Aruba		Aruba		Aruba		Aruba	55	Aruba		Aruba		Aruba		Aruba	55
16	Saint Kitts and Nevis	15	Saint Kitts and Nevis	35	Saint Kitts and Nevis		Saint Kitts and Nevis		Saint Kitts and Nevis		Saint Kitts and Nevis		Saint Kitts and Nevis		Saint Kitts and Nevis		Saint Kitts and Nevis		Saint Kitts and Nevis		Saint Kitts and Nevis	50
17	Belize		Belize		Belize		Belize		Belize		Belize		Belize		Belize		Belize	45	Belize		Belize	45
18	Bonaire		Bonaire		Bonaire		Bonaire		Bonaire		Bonaire		Bonaire	45	Bonaire		Bonaire		Bonaire		Bonaire	45
19	Martinique		Martinique		Martinique		Martinique	15	Martinique		Martinique		Martinique		Martinique		Martinique	25	Martinique		Martinique	40
20	Anguilla		Anguilla		Anguilla		Anguilla		Anguilla		Anguilla	35	Anguilla		Anguilla		Anguilla		Anguilla		Anguilla	35
21	Jamaica		Jamaica	10	Jamaica		Jamaica	25	Jamaica		Jamaica		Jamaica		Jamaica		Jamaica		Jamaica		Jamaica	35
22	Saint Lucia		Saint Lucia		Saint Lucia		Saint Lucia		Saint Lucia		Saint Lucia		Saint Lucia		Saint Lucia	15	Saint Lucia		Saint Lucia		Saint Lucia	15
23	Antigua and Barbuda		Antigua and Barbuda		Antigua and Barbuda		Antigua and Barbuda		Antigua and Barbuda		Antigua and Barbuda		Antigua and Barbuda		Antigua and Barbuda	10	Antigua and Barbuda		Antigua and Barbuda		Antigua and Barbuda	10
