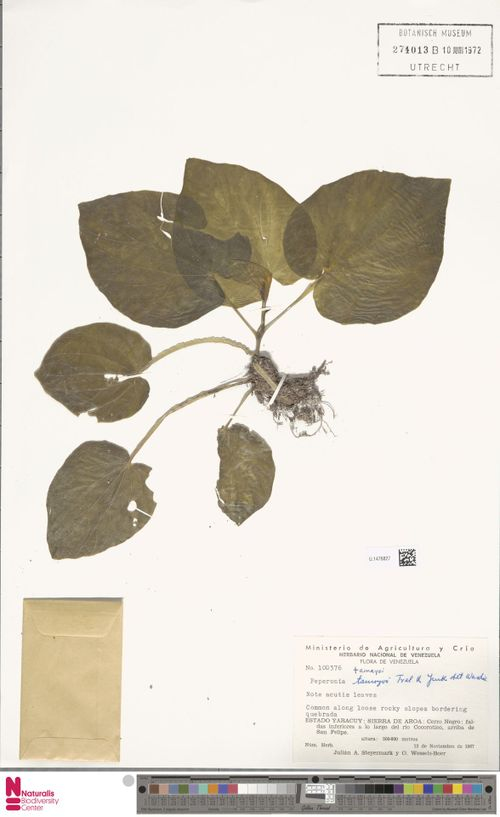

Scientific classification
- Kingdom: Plantae
- Clade: Embryophytes
- Clade: Tracheophytes
- Clade: Angiosperms
- Clade: Magnoliids
- Order: Piperales
- Family: Piperaceae
- Genus: Peperomia
- Species: P. tamayoi

Binomial name
- Peperomia tamayoi Trel. & Yunck.

= Peperomia tamayoi =

Species of lithophyte

Peperomia tamayoi is a species of lithophyte in the genus Peperomia. It was first described by William Trelease & Truman G. Yuncker and published in the book "The Piperaceae of northern South America 2: 484–485, f. 427. 1950". It primarily grows on wet tropical biomes The species name came from Francisco Tamayo, a Venezuelan botanist who collect the first specimens of this species.

== Distribution ==
It is endemic to Colombia, Ecuador, and Venezuela First specimens where found in Carabobo.

- Colombia
  - Antioquia
- Ecuador
  - Pichincha
- Venezuela
  - Yaracuy
  - Carabobo
