= Christian Sørum =

Norwegian beach volleyball player

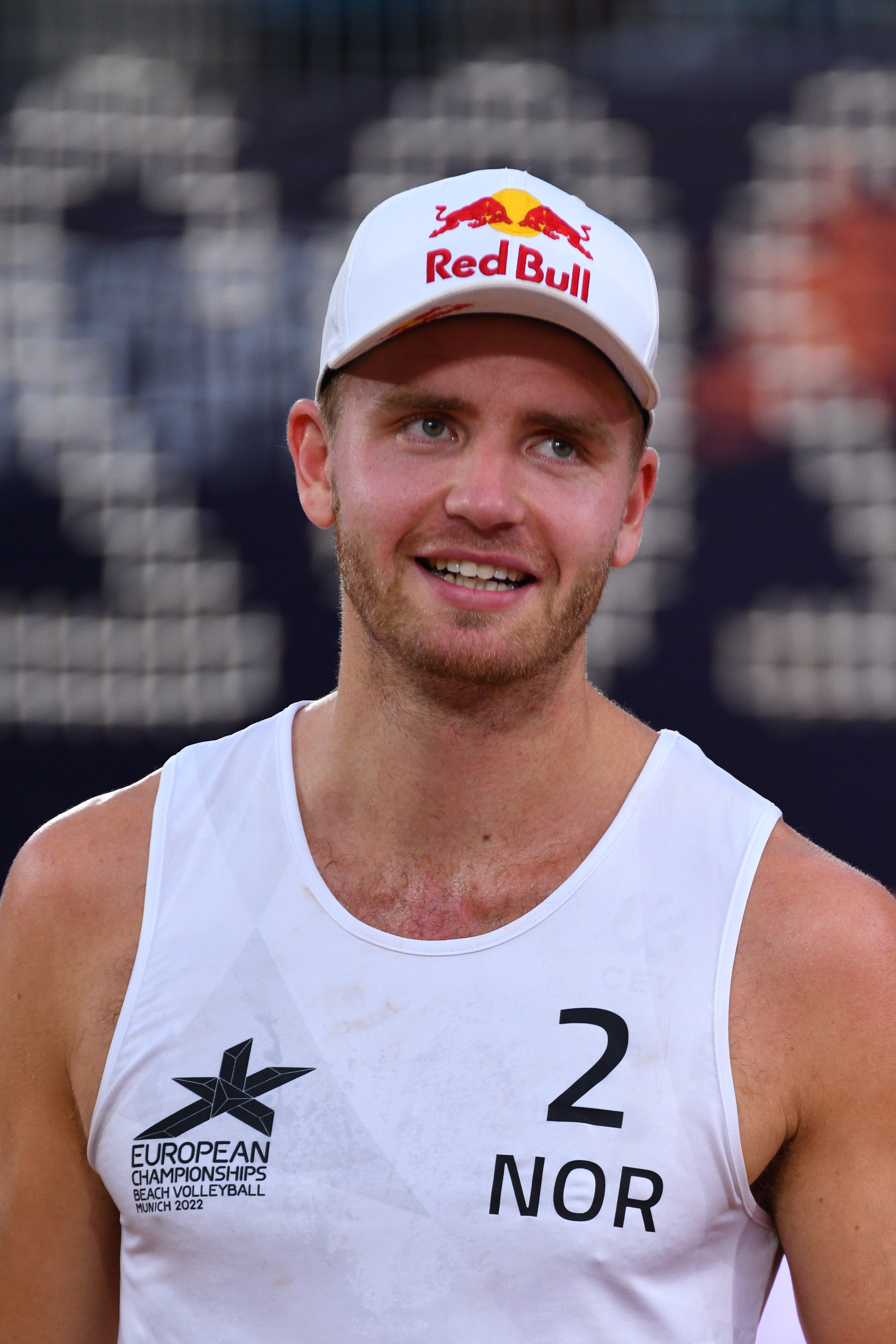
- Sørum in 2022

Personal information
- Full name: Christian Sandlie Sørum
- Nationality: Norwegian
- Born: 3 December 1995 (age 30); Rælingen, Norway
- Height: 1.92 m (6 ft 4 in)
- Weight: 89 kg (196 lb)

Beach volleyball information

Current teammate
Years	Teammate
2016–	Anders Mol

Previous teammates
Years	Teammate
2014–2015; 2015–2016	Runar Sannarnes; Morten Kvamsdal
Honours
Men's beach volleyball
Representing Norway
Olympic Games
Gold medal – first place	2020 Tokyo	Beach
Bronze medal – third place	2024 Paris	Beach
World Championships
Gold medal – first place	2022 Rome	Beach
Bronze medal – third place	2019 Hamburg	Beach
Volleyball World Beach Pro Tour
Gold medal – first place	2026	Montreal Elite 16
Gold medal – first place	2026	Saquarema Elite 16
Gold medal – first place	2025	Hamburg Elite 16
Gold medal – first place	2025	Montreal Elite 16
Gold medal – first place	2025	Saquarema Elite 16
Gold medal – first place	2024	Doha The Finals
Gold medal – first place	2024	João Pessoa Elite 16
Gold medal – first place	2024	Hamburg Elite 16
Gold medal – first place	2024	Vienna Elite 16
Gold medal – first place	2023	Montreal Elite 16
Gold medal – first place	2023	Ostrava Elite 16
Gold medal – first place	2023	Doha Elite 16
Gold medal – first place	2022	Doha The Finals
Gold medal – first place	2022	Cape Town Elite 16
Gold medal – first place	2022	Paris Elite 16
Gold medal – first place	2022	Ostrava Elite 16
Silver medal – second place	2026	Hamburg Elite 16
Silver medal – second place	2025	Ostrava Elite 16
Silver medal – second place	2023	Doha The Finals
Silver medal – second place	2023	Gstaad Elite 16
Silver medal – second place	2023	Uberlândia Elite 16
Silver medal – second place	2023	Tepic Elite 16
Bronze medal – third place	2025	Brasília Elite 16
Bronze medal – third place	2024	Gstaad Elite 16
Bronze medal – third place	2024	Doha Elite 16
Bronze medal – third place	2023	Hamburg Elite 16
Bronze medal – third place	2022	Uberlândia Elite 16
Bronze medal – third place	2022	Rosarito Elite 16
FIVB Beach Volleyball World Tour
Gold medal – first place	2021	Cagliari Tour Final
Gold medal – first place	2021	Cancún 2
Gold medal – first place	2021	Cancún 1
Gold medal – first place	2019	Vienna
Gold medal – first place	2019	Tokyo
Gold medal – first place	2019	Gstaad
Gold medal – first place	2019	Ostrava
Gold medal – first place	2019	Jinjang
Gold medal – first place	2019	Itapema
Gold medal – first place	2018	Las Vegas
Gold medal – first place	2018	Hamburg Tour Final
Gold medal – first place	2018	Vienna
Gold medal – first place	2018	Gstaad
Silver medal – second place	2019	Oslo
Silver medal – second place	2019	Warsaw
Silver medal – second place	2018	Itapema
Bronze medal – third place	2019	Rome Tour Final
European Championship
Gold medal – first place	2025 Düsseldorf	Beach
Gold medal – first place	2021 Vienna	Beach
Gold medal – first place	2020 Jurmala	Beach
Gold medal – first place	2019 Moscow	Beach
Gold medal – first place	2018 Netherlands	Beach
Silver medal – second place	2026 Stare Jabłonki	Beach
Bronze medal – third place	2022 Munich	Beach

Christian Sandlie Sørum (born 3 December 1995) is a Norwegian beach volleyball player. He won the gold medal at the 2020 Olympics in Tokyo.

== Beach career ==
Sorum has been playing beach volleyball in national and international tournaments since 2011, starting CEV U18 with Knut-Ludvig Larsen and from 2012 with Bjarne Nikolai Huus, finishing 2nd in the FIVB U19 World Championship. With Runar Sannarnes in 2014 he became U22 European champion in Fehiye.

With Morten Kvamsdal, he had his first top ten finish at the 2016 FIVB World Tour in Fortaleza and was ninth at the European Championships in Biel. Since the end of July 2016 Sorum plays with Anders Mol, with whom he finished fifth at the FIVB Major in Klagenfurt and won the U22 European Championship in Thessaloniki.

In 2017, Mol / Sorum took second place at the FIVB 5-Star-Tournament in Gstaad, won the CEV Masters in Ljubljana and finished fifth at the European Championships in Jurmala.

In 2018, they started again at the 4-star tournament in Den Haag with a fifth place. It was followed by many more top 10 finishes, including a fifth place in Xiamen, a second place in Itapema, a fifth place in Espinho and the victory in Gstaad.

In July, Mol / Sorum became European Champions in the Netherlands. Then they also won the 5-star tournament in Vienna and climbed, after 19 victories in a row, at number one in the world rankings. Also at the World Tour Final in Hamburg Mol / Sorum emerged victorious. With that win the duo landed their forth FIVB World Tour gold medal in a row and earned them the highest ever prize money in the history of beach volleyball, taking home 150,000 $ in total. Sorum was awarded FIVB Best Defender for the 2018/2017 season.

The World Tour 2018-19 season was dominated by absolute dominance of Mol / Sorum. They won the 4-star tournaments in Las Vegas, Itapema, Jinjiang, Ostrava, and finished second in Warsaw.

At the World Championships in Hamburg, they retired in the semifinals against the German team Thole /Wickler and finished third in the end. The following tournaments in Gstaad, Tokyo, and Vienna they could win again. At the European Championships in Moscow, Mol / Sorum defended their title. At the World Tour Finals in Rome, Mol / Sorum won a bronze medal. For the second year in a row, Sorum was awarded FIVB Best Defender. Mol / Sorum were also awarded FIVB Most Outstanding Men’s Team.

In 2020, Mol / Sorum once again defended their European Championship title winning gold in Jurmala, Latvia. This win made them the third team in history to win a European Championship three years in a row. At 23 and 24 respectively they are the youngest team to achieve this feat.

At the 2020 Tokyo Olympics, the pair won gold medals, beating Russians Viacheslav Krasilnikov and Oleg Stoyanovskiy in the final.

They won gold at the 2021 European Championship in Vienna, becoming the first team to win it four times and the first team to win four consecutive times.

== Indoor career ==
Sorum played from 2012 to 2014 also indoor volleyball in the Norwegian junior national team as an outside attacker. In the 2013-14 season, he played with Forde VBK in the European Challenge Cup.

Sporting positions
Preceded by Evandro Oliveira and André Stein (BRA)	Men's FIVB Beach Volley World Tour Winner alongside (Norway) Anders Mol; 2018; 2019	Succeeded by Cherif Younousse and Ahmed Tijan (QAT)
Awards
Preceded by Viacheslav Krasilnikov (RUS)	Men's FIVB World Tour "Best Defensive Player"; 2018; 2019	Succeeded by Discontinued
Preceded by Evandro Oliveira and André Stein (BRA)	Men's FIVB World Tour "Team of the Year" alongside (Norway) Anders Mol; 2018; 2019	Succeeded by Discontinued
