= Shiokaze Park =

Public park in Tokyo, Japan

- 潮風公園
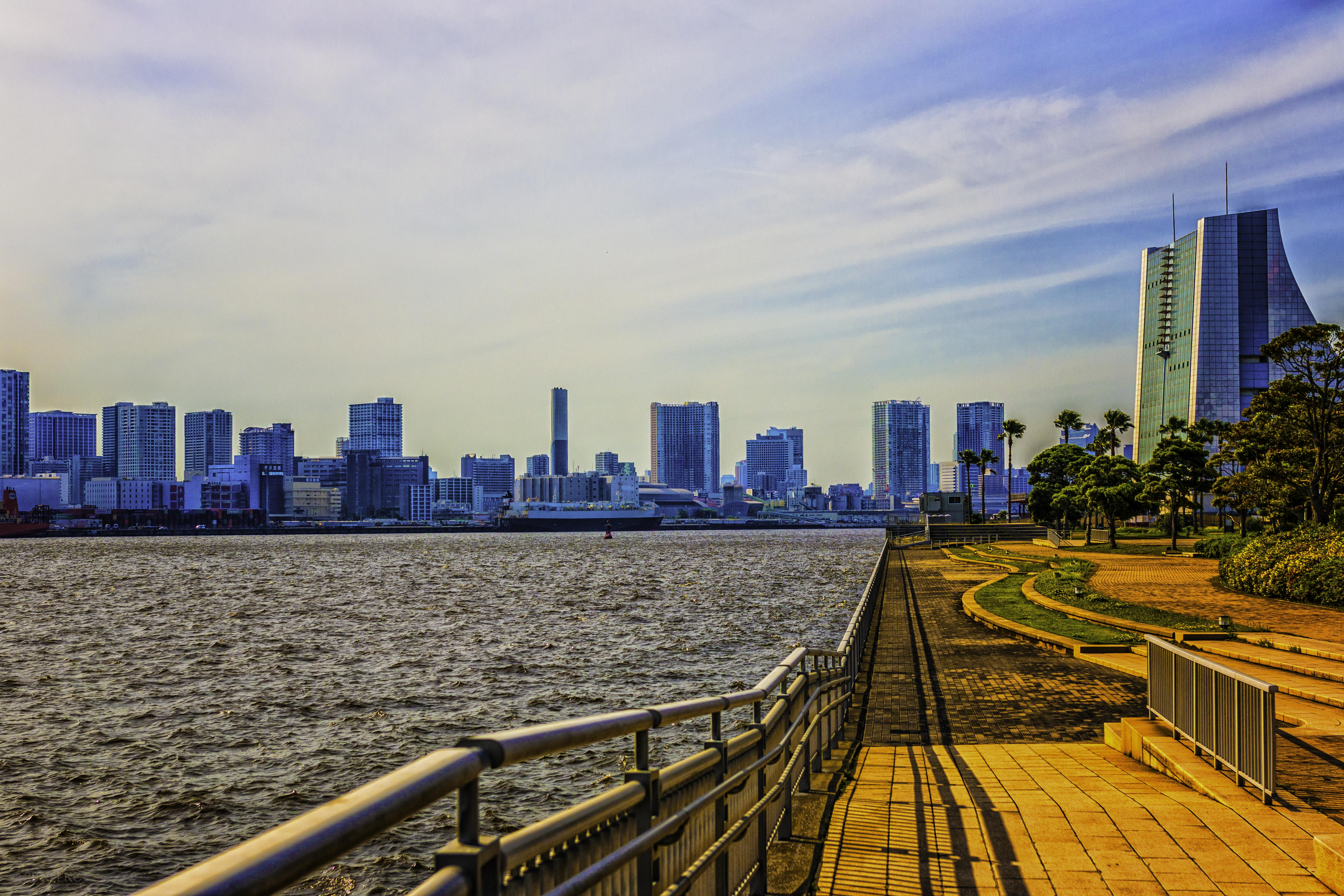
- Shiokaze Park
- Interactive map of Shiokaze Park
- Location: Odaiba Island, Tokyo, Japan
- Coordinates: 35°37′26″N 139°46′08″E
- Area: 154,939.86 m^{2} (1,667,758.8 sq ft)
- Created: June 1, 1974

Shiokaze Park (Japanese: 潮風公園, Hepburn: Shiokaze Kōen) is a public park and was a temporary beach volleyball sport venue for the 2020 Summer Olympics, located in Tokyo, Japan.

== History ==
Shiokaze Park opened on June 1, 1974. It is located in Odaiba Island in Tokyo, and has a view of the Rainbow Bridge.

== 2020 Summer Olympics ==
Shiokaze Park was the site of a temporary beach volleyball venue for the 2020 Summer Olympics. Its capacity was 12,000.

== Vegetation ==
Shiokaze Park has 12,800 trees and 27,600 shrubs, including the following vegetation:

- Cockspur coral tree
- Olive tree
- Japanese black pine
- Crape myrtle
- Quercus myrsinifolia
- Machilus thunbergii
- Gray Bottlebrush
- Matebashii tree
- Wax myrtle
- Washington palm tree
