= Francisco Tamayo =

Venezuelan botanist (1902–1985)

Francisco Tamayo Yepes (4 October 1902 in Lara, Venezuela – 14 February 1985 in Caracas, Venezuela) was a Venezuelan botanist.

Species named after Tamayo include Erytina tamayonis, Ichantus tamayonis, Lupinus tamayoanus, Mammiliaria tamayonis, Paspalum tamayonis, Peperomia tamayoi and Tamayoa paraguanensis.
