= Edgars Točs =

Latvian beach volleyball player

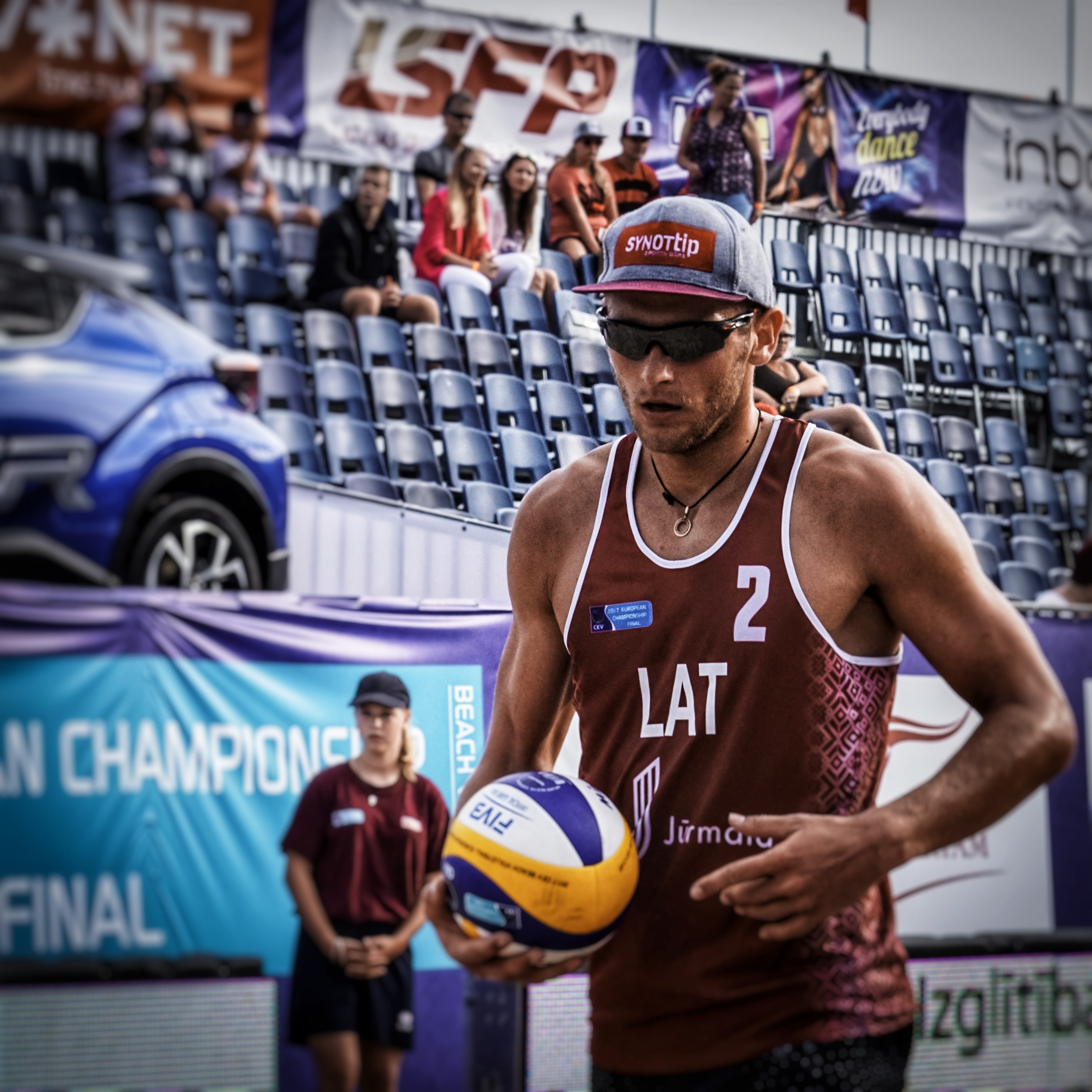

Personal information
- Nationality: Latvian
- Born: 29 November 1988 (age 37); Madona, Latvia
- Hometown: Madona, Latvia
- Height: 196 cm (6 ft 5 in)
- Weight: 94 kg (207 lb)
- Education: University of Daugavpils

Beach volleyball information

Current teammate
Teammate
Mārtiņš Pļaviņš

Previous teammates
Years	Teammate
2010– present	Toms Vanags; Toms Benjavs; Toms Šmēdiņš; Richard Finster

National team
Latvia
- Last updated: 4 August 2021

Edgars Točs (born 29 November 1988) is a Latvian beach volleyball player. He made his debut appearance at the Olympics representing Latvia at the 2020 Summer Olympics.

== Career ==
In 2010, he competed in separate tournaments together with Toms Vanags and Toms Benjavs. He competed in 2012 along with Toms Šmēdiņš and Toms Benjavs. He then paired with Richard Finster and the duo played a total of 29 international ranked tournaments.

He then decided to pair with Mārtiņš Pļaviņš and competed in international competitions since December 2017. He paired along with Mārtiņš Pļaviņš won the Dela Beach Open in January 2018 which was part of the 2018 FIVB Beach Volleyball World Tour. In July 2019, he along with Mārtiņš Pļaviņš had a third-place finish in the Espinho Open which was part of the 2019 FIVB Beach Volleyball World Tour. He was awarded the Latvian Beach Volleyball Male Player of the Year in 2019 by the Latvian Volleyball Federation.

He also paired with Mārtiņš Pļaviņš and competed in the men's beach volleyball tournament at the 2020 Summer Olympics.
