= José Luis Rubio =

Mexican beach volleyball player (born 1996)

Personal information
- Full name: José Luis Rubio Camargo
- Nationality: Mexico
- Born: 17 October 1996 (age 28); Los Ángeles del Triunfo, Mexico
- Height: 1.95 m (6 ft 5 in)

Sport
- Sport: Beach volleyball

José Luis Rubio Camargo (born 17 October 1996) is a Mexican beach volleyball player. He competed in the 2020 Summer Olympics.

Known as "El Tigüi" or "El Tiwi", Rubio hails from Los Ángeles del Triunfo, Guasave Municipality, Sinaloa. He initially played association football before switching to volleyball at age 14.
