= Adrian Heidrich =

Swiss beach volleyball player

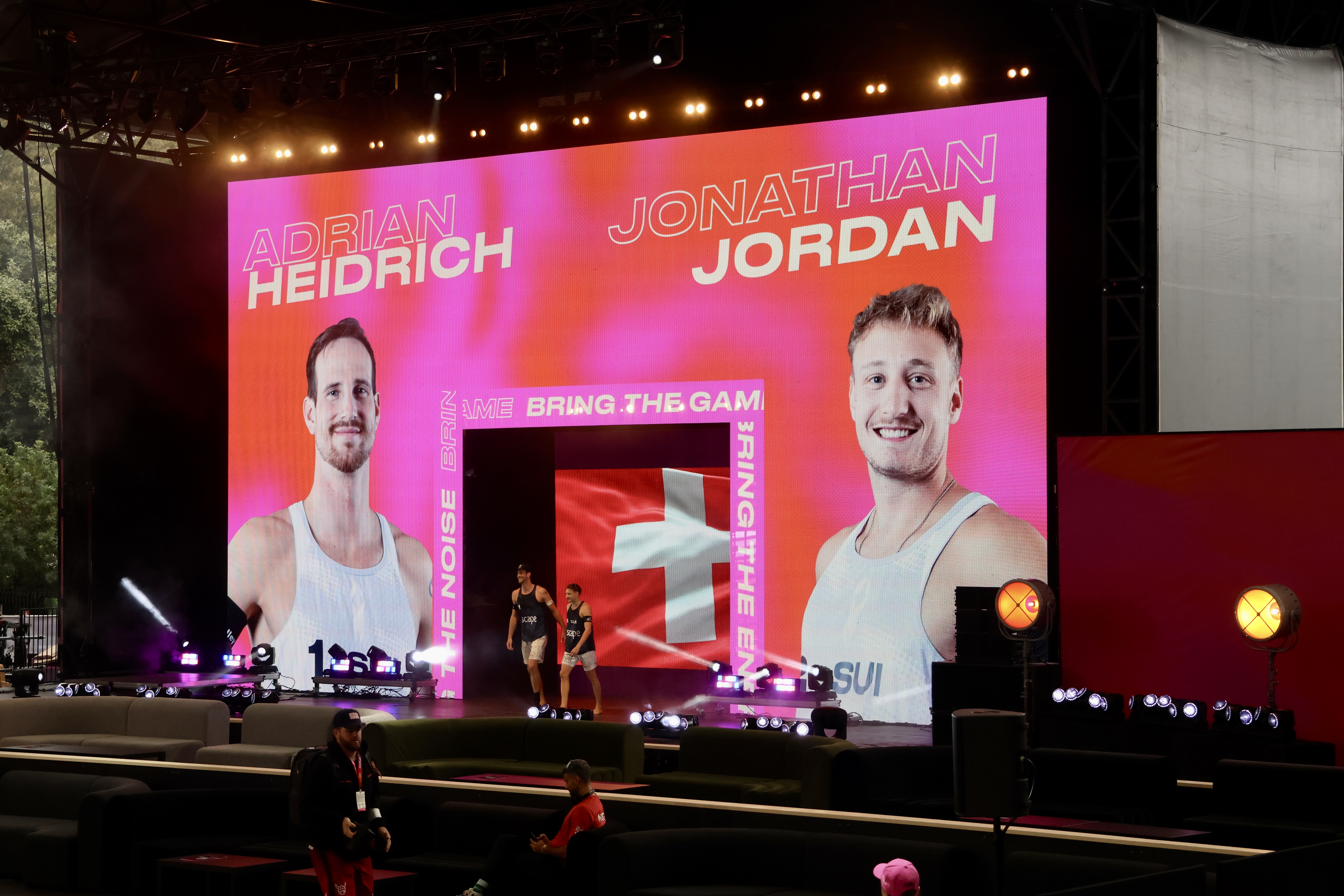
- Heidrich and his partner Jonathan Jordan displayed on the screen during the Beach World Championships

Personal information
- Nationality: Switzerland
- Born: 18 September 1994 (age 31) Kloten, Switzerland
- Height: 2.07 m (6 ft 9 in)

Sport
- Sport: Beach volleyball

Adrian Heidrich (born 18 September 1994) is a Swiss beach volleyball player. He competed in the 2020 Summer Olympics in which he placed 17th.
