= Mirco Gerson =

Swiss beach volleyball player

Personal information
- Nationality: Switzerland
- Born: 29 December 1992 (age 32); Belp, Switzerland
- Height: 1.86 m (6 ft 1 in)

Sport
- Sport: Beach volleyball

Mirco Gerson (born 29 December 1992) is a Swiss beach volleyball player. He competed in the 2020 Summer Olympics.
