= Josué Gaxiola =

Mexican beach volleyball player (born 1997)

Personal information
- Full name: Josué Gastón Gaxiola Leyva
- Nationality: Mexico
- Born: 2 September 1997 (age 27); Tamazula, Sinaloa, Mexico
- Height: 1.83 m (6 ft 0 in)

Sport
- Sport: Beach volleyball

Josué Gastón Gaxiola Leyva (born 2 September 1997) is a Mexican beach volleyball player. He competed in the 2020 Summer Olympics. Nicknamed "El Bobe", he hails from Tamazula, Guasave Municipality, Sinaloa.
