= 2021 FIVB Beach Volleyball U19 World Championships – Women's tournament =

Tournament details
- Host country: Thailand
- City: Phuket
- Dates: 6–11 December
- Teams: (from 5 confederations)

Final positions
- Champions: United States; Megan Kraft; Delayne Maple (1st title)
- Runners-up: Russia; Olga Gavrilova; Alina Salmanova
- Third place: Ukraine; Anhelina Khmil; Tetiana Lazarenko
- Fourth place: United States; Xolani Hodel; Katherine Reilly

The 2021 FIVB Beach Volleyball U19 World Championships – Women's tournament was held from 6 to 11 December 2021.

== Preliminary round ==
=== Pool A ===
Pos	Team	Pld	W	L	Pts	SW	SL	SR	SPW	SPL	SPR	Qualification
1	(Thailand) S.Apinya – B.Jidapa	3	3	0	6	6	1	6.000	139	111	1.252	Round of 16
2	(Spain) Binimelis – Fernández Da Silva	3	2	1	5	5	2	2.500	137	106	1.292	Round of 24
3	(Hungary) Gubik – Vasvári,Z.	3	1	2	4	2	4	0.500	91	106	0.858	Round of 24
4	(Kazakhstan) Kabulbekova – Ivanchenko	3	0	3	3	0	6	0.000	82	126	0.651	

7 December 2021	S.Apinya – B.Jidapa (Thailand)	2–1	(Spain) Binimelis – Fernández Da Silva
7 December 2021	(16–21, 21–16, 18–16); Report

7 December 2021	Kabulbekova – Ivanchenko (Kazakhstan)	0–2	(Hungary) Gubik – Vasvári,Z.
7 December 2021	(11–21, 11–21); Report

7 December 2021	S.Apinya – B.Jidapa (Thailand)	2–0	(Hungary) Gubik – Vasvári,Z.
7 December 2021	(21–15, 21–12); Report

7 December 2021	Kabulbekova – Ivanchenko (Kazakhstan)	0–2	(Spain) Binimelis – Fernández Da Silva
7 December 2021	(17–21, 12–21); Report

8 December 2021	S.Apinya – B.Jidapa (Thailand)	2–0	(Kazakhstan) Kabulbekova – Ivanchenko
8 December 2021	(21–16, 21–15); Report

8 December 2021	Gubik – Vasvári,Z. (Hungary)	0–2	(Spain) Binimelis – Fernández Da Silva
8 December 2021	(9–21, 13–21); Report

=== Pool B ===
Pos	Team	Pld	W	L	Pts	SW	SL	SR	SPW	SPL	SPR	Qualification
1	(Russia) Bocharova – Gubina	3	3	0	6	6	1	6.000	139	98	1.418	Round of 16
2	(Czech Republic) Kylie – Brinkova	3	2	1	5	4	2	2.000	110	94	1.170	Round of 24
3	(Latvia) Brailko – Namiķe	3	1	2	4	3	4	0.750	126	124	1.016	Round of 24
4	(Finland) Hautala – Mäkitalo	3	0	3	3	0	6	0.000	67	126	0.532	

7 December 2021	Bocharova – Gubina (Russia)	2–0	(Finland) Hautala – Mäkitalo
7 December 2021	(21–10, 21–13); Report

7 December 2021	Kylie – Brinkova (Czech Republic)	2–0	(Latvia) Brailko – Namiķe
7 December 2021	(21–18, 21–17); Report

7 December 2021	Bocharova – Gubina (Russia)	2–1	(Latvia) Brailko – Namiķe
7 December 2021	(19–21, 21–15, 15–13); Report

7 December 2021	Kylie – Brinkova (Czech Republic)	2–0	(Finland) Hautala – Mäkitalo
7 December 2021	(21–7, 21–10); Report

8 December 2021	Bocharova – Gubina (Russia)	2–0	(Czech Republic) Kylie – Brinkova
8 December 2021	(21–10, 21–16); Report

8 December 2021	Brailko – Namiķe (Latvia)	2–0	(Finland) Hautala – Mäkitalo
8 December 2021	(21–14, 21–13); Report

=== Pool C ===
Pos	Team	Pld	W	L	Pts	SW	SL	SR	SPW	SPL	SPR	Qualification
1	(Italy) Gottardi – Mattavelli	3	3	0	6	6	1	6.000	146	118	1.237	Round of 16
2	(Netherlands) Poiesz – Piersma B.	3	2	1	5	5	2	2.500	139	120	1.158	Round of 24
3	(Australia) Fleming – Mears	3	1	2	4	2	4	0.500	104	123	0.846	Round of 24
4	(Paraguay) Adri – Fio	3	0	3	3	0	6	0.000	99	127	0.780	

7 December 2021	Poiesz – Piersma B. (Netherlands)	2–0	(Australia) Fleming – Mears
7 December 2021	(22–20, 21–9); Report

7 December 2021	Gottardi – Mattavelli (Italy)	2–0	(Paraguay) Adri – Fio
7 December 2021	(22–20, 21–11); Report

7 December 2021	Poiesz – Piersma B. (Netherlands)	2–0	(Paraguay) Adri – Fio
7 December 2021	(21–15, 21–17); Report

7 December 2021	Gottardi – Mattavelli (Italy)	2–0	(Australia) Fleming – Mears
7 December 2021	(23–21, 21–12); Report

8 December 2021	Poiesz – Piersma B. (Netherlands)	1–2	(Italy) Gottardi – Mattavelli
8 December 2021	(18–21, 25–23, 11–15); Report

8 December 2021	Adri – Fio (Paraguay)	0–2	(Australia) Fleming – Mears
8 December 2021	(19–21, 17–21); Report

=== Pool D ===
Pos	Team	Pld	W	L	Pts	SW	SL	SR	SPW	SPL	SPR	Qualification
1	(Denmark) Windeleff – Bisgaard	3	3	0	6	6	1	6.000	139	116	1.198	Round of 16
2	(Spain) Tania – Vergara	3	2	1	5	5	2	2.500	135	111	1.216	Round of 24
3	(Australia) Stevens – Fejes	3	1	2	4	2	4	0.500	108	113	0.956	Round of 24
4	(Thailand) K.Aungkhawipa – Ch.Tassanee	3	0	3	3	0	6	0.000	84	126	0.667	

7 December 2021	Tania – Vergara (Spain)	2–0	(Thailand) K.Aungkhawipa – Ch.Tassanee
7 December 2021	(21–12, 21–10); Report

7 December 2021	Stevens – Fejes (Australia)	0–2	(Denmark) Windeleff – Bisgaard
7 December 2021	(15–21, 17–21); Report

7 December 2021	Tania – Vergara (Spain)	1–2	(Denmark) Windeleff – Bisgaard
7 December 2021	(21–19, 18–21, 12–15); Report

7 December 2021	Stevens – Fejes (Australia)	2–0	(Thailand) K.Aungkhawipa – Ch.Tassanee
7 December 2021	(21–16, 21–13); Report

8 December 2021	Tania – Vergara (Spain)	2–0	(Australia) Stevens – Fejes
8 December 2021	(21–17, 21–17); Report

8 December 2021	Windeleff – Bisgaard (Denmark)	2–0	(Thailand) K.Aungkhawipa – Ch.Tassanee
8 December 2021	(21–15, 21–18); Report

=== Pool E ===
Pos	Team	Pld	W	L	Pts	SW	SL	SR	SPW	SPL	SPR	Qualification
1	(Ukraine) Khmil – Lazarenko	3	2	1	5	5	3	1.667	157	113	1.389	Round of 16
2	(United States) Hodel – Reilly	3	2	1	5	5	2	2.500	129	96	1.344	Round of 24
3	(Canada) Glagau – Sorra	3	2	1	5	4	3	1.333	126	126	1.000	Round of 24
4	(Chile) Marcela – Danae	3	0	3	3	0	6	0.000	49	126	0.389	

7 December 2021	Hodel – Reilly (United States)	2–0	(Canada) Glagau – Sorra
7 December 2021	(21–14, 21–14); Report

7 December 2021	Khmil – Lazarenko (Ukraine)	2–0	(Chile) Marcela – Danae
7 December 2021	(21–8, 21–4); Report

8 December 2021	Hodel – Reilly (United States)	2–0	(Chile) Marcela – Danae
8 December 2021	(21–7, 21–7); Report

8 December 2021	Khmil – Lazarenko (Ukraine)	1–2	(Canada) Glagau – Sorra
8 December 2021	(18–21, 21–11, 22–24); Report

8 December 2021	Hodel – Reilly (United States)	1–2	(Ukraine) Khmil – Lazarenko
8 December 2021	(21–18, 14–21, 10–15); Report

8 December 2021	Marcela – Danae (Chile)	0–2	(Canada) Glagau – Sorra
8 December 2021	(13–21, 10–21); Report

=== Pool F ===
Pos	Team	Pld	W	L	Pts	SW	SL	SR	SPW	SPL	SPR	Qualification
1	(United States) Kraft – Maple	3	3	0	6	6	0	MAX	126	60	2.100	Round of 16
2	(Germany) Beutel – Schürholz	3	2	1	5	4	3	1.333	118	117	1.009	Round of 24
3	(Poland) Marcinowska – Lunio	3	1	2	4	3	4	0.750	111	112	0.991	Round of 24
4	(Colombia) Isabela – Gaviria	3	0	3	3	0	6	0.000	60	126	0.476	

7 December 2021	Marcinowska – Lunio (Poland)	0–2	(United States) Kraft – Maple
7 December 2021	(9–21, 11–21); Report

7 December 2021	Beutel – Schürholz (Germany)	2–0	(Colombia) Isabela – Gaviria
7 December 2021	(21–13, 21–13); Report

8 December 2021	Marcinowska – Lunio (Poland)	2–0	(Colombia) Isabela – Gaviria
8 December 2021	(21–11, 21–9); Report

8 December 2021	Beutel – Schürholz (Germany)	0–2	(United States) Kraft – Maple
8 December 2021	(11–21, 15–21); Report

8 December 2021	Marcinowska – Lunio (Poland)	1–2	(Germany) Beutel – Schürholz
8 December 2021	(21–14, 16–21, 12–15); Report

8 December 2021	Isabela – Gaviria (Colombia)	0–2	(United States) Kraft – Maple
8 December 2021	(6–21, 8–21); Report

=== Pool G ===
Pos	Team	Pld	W	L	Pts	SW	SL	SR	SPW	SPL	SPR	Qualification
1	(Russia) Gavrilova – Salmanova	3	3	0	6	6	0	MAX	126	67	1.881	Round of 16
2	(Brazil) Mafe – Carol	3	2	1	5	4	3	1.333	125	111	1.126	Round of 24
3	(Switzerland) Toschini – Kernen	3	1	2	4	3	5	0.600	117	139	0.842	Round of 24
4	(Finland) Mäenpää – Muukka	3	0	3	3	1	6	0.167	87	138	0.630	

7 December 2021	Toschini – Kernen (Switzerland)	0–2	(Russia) Gavrilova – Salmanova
7 December 2021	(10–21, 12–21); Report

7 December 2021	Mafe – Carol (Brazil)	2–0	(Finland) Mäenpää – Muukka
7 December 2021	(21–15, 21–13); Report

8 December 2021	Toschini – Kernen (Switzerland)	2–1	(Finland) Mäenpää – Muukka
8 December 2021	(21–14, 18–21, 15–7); Report

8 December 2021	Mafe – Carol (Brazil)	0–2	(Russia) Gavrilova – Salmanova
8 December 2021	(13–21, 15–21); Report

8 December 2021	Toschini – Kernen (Switzerland)	1–2	(Brazil) Mafe – Carol
8 December 2021	(21–19, 12–21, 8–15); Report

8 December 2021	Mäenpää – Muukka (Finland)	0–2	(Russia) Gavrilova – Salmanova
8 December 2021	(10–21, 7–21); Report

=== Pool H ===
Pos	Team	Pld	W	L	Pts	SW	SL	SR	SPW	SPL	SPR	Qualification
1	(Canada) Mann – Santer	3	3	0	6	6	2	3.000	148	135	1.096	Round of 16
2	(Thailand) Ch.Suchinna – S.Patcharaporn	3	2	1	5	5	4	1.250	161	145	1.110	Round of 24
3	(Mexico) Ramirez – Flores	3	1	2	4	3	4	0.750	124	126	0.984	Round of 24
4	(Germany) Uhl – Prade	3	0	3	3	2	6	0.333	127	154	0.825	

7 December 2021	Ch.Suchinna – S.Patcharaporn (Thailand)	2–1	(Germany) Uhl – Prade
7 December 2021	(18–21, 24–22, 15–6); Report

7 December 2021	Mann – Santer (Canada)	2–0	(Mexico) Ramirez – Flores
7 December 2021	(21–18, 21–19); Report

8 December 2021	Ch.Suchinna – S.Patcharaporn (Thailand)	2–1	(Mexico) Ramirez – Flores
8 December 2021	(21–15, 19–21, 15–9); Report

8 December 2021	Mann – Santer (Canada)	2–1	(Germany) Uhl – Prade
8 December 2021	(21–18, 19–21, 15–10); Report

8 December 2021	Ch.Suchinna – S.Patcharaporn (Thailand)	1–2	(Canada) Mann – Santer
8 December 2021	(21–15, 15–21, 13–15); Report

8 December 2021	Ramirez – Flores (Mexico)	2–0	(Germany) Uhl – Prade
8 December 2021	(21–14, 21–15); Report

== Knockout stage ==
=== Bracket ===
Round of 16
9 December
(Russia) Bocharova – Gubina	2
(Poland) Marcinowska – Lunio	0
9 December
(Russia) Gavrilova – Salmanova	2
(Spain) Tania – Vergara	0
9 December
(Ukraine) Khmil – Lazarenko	2
(Spain) Binimelis – Fernández Da Silva	0
9 December
(Denmark) Windeleff – Bisgaard	2
(Czech Republic) Kylie – Brinkova	0
9 December
(Italy) Gottardi – Mattavelli	2
(Latvia) Brailko – Namiķe	1
9 December
(United States) Kraft – Maple	2
(Netherlands) Poiesz – Piersma B.	1
9 December
(Canada) Mann – Santer	0
(United States) Hodel – Reilly	2
9 December
(Thailand) S.Apinya – B.Jidapa	1
(Canada) Glagau – Sorra	2

Quarter-finals
10 December
(Russia) Bocharova – Gubina	0
(Russia) Gavrilova – Salmanova	2
10 December
(Ukraine) Khmil – Lazarenko	2
(Denmark) Windeleff – Bisgaard	0
10 December
(Italy) Gottardi – Mattavelli	0
(United States) Kraft – Maple	2
10 December
(United States) Hodel – Reilly	2
(Canada) Glagau – Sorra	1

Semi-finals
10 December
(Russia) Gavrilova – Salmanova	2
(Ukraine) Khmil – Lazarenko	0
10 December
(United States) Kraft – Maple	2
(United States) Hodel – Reilly	0

Final
11 December
(Russia) Gavrilova – Salmanova	0
(United States) Kraft – Maple	2
Third place
11 December
(Ukraine) Khmil – Lazarenko	2
(United States) Hodel – Reilly	0

=== Round of 24 ===
9 December 2021	Ch.Suchinna – S.Patcharaporn (Thailand)	0–2	(Poland) Marcinowska – Lunio
9 December 2021	(18–21, 14–21); Report

9 December 2021	Tania – Vergara (Spain)	2–0	(Hungary) Gubik – Vasvári,Z.
9 December 2021	(21–16, 21–15); Report

9 December 2021	Binimelis – Fernández Da Silva (Spain)	2–1	(Australia) Stevens – Fejes
9 December 2021	(21–17, 16–21, 16–14); Report

9 December 2021	Kylie – Brinkova (Czech Republic)	2–0	(Mexico) Ramirez – Flores
9 December 2021	(21–16, 21–13); Report

9 December 2021	Mafe – Carol (Brazil)	1–2	(Latvia) Brailko – Namiķe
9 December 2021	(16–21, 21–18, 10–15); Report

9 December 2021	Poiesz – Piersma B. (Netherlands)	2–0	(Switzerland) Toschini – Kernen
9 December 2021	(21–13, 21–17); Report

9 December 2021	Hodel – Reilly (United States)	2–0	(Australia) Fleming – Mears
9 December 2021	(21–19, 21–12); Report

9 December 2021	Beutel – Schürholz (Germany)	0–2	(Canada) Glagau – Sorra
9 December 2021	(19–21, 13–21); Report

=== Round of 16 ===
9 December 2021	Bocharova – Gubina (Russia)	2–0	(Poland) Marcinowska – Lunio
9 December 2021	(21–8, 22–20); Report

9 December 2021	Gavrilova – Salmanova (Russia)	2–0	(Spain) Tania – Vergara
9 December 2021	(21–17, 21–16); Report

9 December 2021	Khmil – Lazarenko (Ukraine)	2–0	(Spain) Binimelis – Fernández Da Silva
9 December 2021	(21–18, 21–18); Report

9 December 2021	Windeleff – Bisgaard (Denmark)	2–0	(Czech Republic) Kylie – Brinkova
9 December 2021	(21–12, 21–10); Report

9 December 2021	Gottardi – Mattavelli (Italy)	2–1	(Latvia) Brailko – Namiķe
9 December 2021	(24–22, 17–21, 15–12); Report

9 December 2021	Kraft – Maple (United States)	2–1	(Netherlands) Poiesz – Piersma B.
9 December 2021	(17–21, 21–8, 15–10); Report

9 December 2021	Mann – Santer (Canada)	0–2	(United States) Hodel – Reilly
9 December 2021	(10–21, 19–21); Report

9 December 2021	S.Apinya – B.Jidapa (Thailand)	1–2	(Canada) Glagau – Sorra
9 December 2021	(21–18, 19–21, 12–15); Report

=== Quarterfinals ===
10 December 2021	Bocharova – Gubina (Russia)	0–2	(Russia) Gavrilova – Salmanova
10 December 2021	(20–22, 19–21); Report

10 December 2021	Khmil – Lazarenko (Ukraine)	2–0	(Denmark) Windeleff – Bisgaard
10 December 2021	(21–18, 21–17); Report

10 December 2021	Gottardi – Mattavelli (Italy)	0–2	(United States) Kraft – Maple
10 December 2021	(10–21, 20–22); Report

10 December 2021	Hodel – Reilly (United States)	2–1	(Canada) Glagau – Sorra
10 December 2021	(21–13, 19–21, 15–12); Report

=== Semifinals ===
10 December 2021	Gavrilova – Salmanova (Russia)	2–0	(Ukraine) Khmil – Lazarenko
10 December 2021	(21–13, 25–23); Report

10 December 2021	Kraft – Maple (United States)	2–0	(United States) Hodel – Reilly
10 December 2021	(21–17, 21–15); Report

=== Third place game ===
11 December 2021	Khmil – Lazarenko (Ukraine)	2–0	(United States) Hodel – Reilly
11 December 2021	(21–15, 21–19); Report

=== Final ===
11 December 2021	Gavrilova – Salmanova (Russia)	0–2	(United States) Kraft – Maple
11 December 2021	(12–21, 17–21); Report

== Final ranking ==
Rank	Team
Gold medal	(United States) Kraft – Maple
Silver medal	(Russia) Gavrilova – Salmanova
Bronze medal	(Ukraine) Khmil – Lazarenko
4	(United States) Hodel – Reilly
5	(Canada) Glagau – Sorra
5	(Denmark) Windeleff – Bisgaard
5	(Italy) Gottardi – Mattavelli
5	(Russia) Bocharova – Gubina
9	(Canada) Mann – Santer
9	(Czech Republic) Kylie – Brinkova
9	(Spain) Binimelis – Fernández Da Silva
9	(Spain) Tania – Vergara
9	(Latvia) Brailko – Namiķe
9	(Netherlands) Poiesz – Piersma B.
9	(Poland) Marcinowska – Lunio
9	(Thailand) S.Apinya – B.Jidapa
17	(Australia) Fleming – Mears
17	(Australia) Stevens – Fejes
17	(Brazil) Mafe – Carol
17	(Germany) Beutel – Schürholz
17	(Hungary) Gubik – Vasvári,Z.
17	(Mexico) Ramirez – Flores
17	(Switzerland) Toschini – Kernen
17	(Thailand) Ch.Suchinna – S.Patcharaporn
25	(Chile) Marcela – Danae
25	(Colombia) Isabela – Gaviria
25	(Finland) Hautala – Mäkitalo
25	(Finland) Mäenpää – Muukka
25	(Germany) Uhl – Prade
25	(Kazakhstan) Kabulbekova – Ivanchenko
25	(Paraguay) Adri – Fio
25	(Thailand) K.Aungkhawipa – Ch.Tassanee
33	(Brazil) Larissa – Duda
33	(Kazakhstan) Shingissova – Khristolyubova
33	(Latvia) Ozolina A. – Liepajniece
