= European U22 Beach Volleyball Championships =

Beach volleyball championship

European U22 Beach Volleyball Championships is a double-gender beach volleyball tournament for national U22 teams. It is organised annually by the European Volleyball Confederation (CEV). First held in 1999, it was originally an under-23 tournament until 2013 when it was restricted to athletes under the age of 22.

== Results ==
=== Men ===
#	Year	Location	Gold	Silver	Bronze
1999–2012: U23
1	1999	(Greece)	(Spain)	(Greece)	(Germany) / (Greece)
2	2000	(San Marino)	(Germany)	(Spain)	(Russia)
3	2001	(Portugal)	(Portugal)	(Germany)	(Russia)
–	2002	Not held	Not held	Not held	Not held
4	2003	(Poland)	(Russia)	(Germany)	(Germany)
5	2004	(Czech Republic)	(Spain)	(Germany)	(Poland)
6	2005	(Poland)	(Latvia)	(Finland)	(Germany)
7	2006	(Austria)	(Austria)	(Germany)	(Latvia)
8	2007	(Cyprus)	(Germany)	(Spain)	(Russia)
9	2008	(Portugal)	(Poland)	(Italy)	(Germany)
10	2009	(Russia)	(Germany)	(Russia)	(Germany)
11	2010	Kos, Greece	(Poland) Poland; Michal Kadziola; Jakub Szalankiewicz	(Germany) Germany; Matthias Penk; Alexander Walkenhorst	(Italy) Italy; Paolo Nicolai; Paolo Ingrosso
12	2011	Porto, Portugal	(Germany) Germany; Lars Flüggen; Stefan Köhler	(Poland) Poland; Michal Kadziola; Jakub Szalankiewicz	(Russia) Russia; Sergey Kostyukhin; Ruslan Bykanov
13	2012	Assen, Netherlands	(Ukraine) Ukraine; Sergiy Popov; Valeriy Samoday	(Poland) Poland; Bartosz Łosiak; Piotr Kantor	(Belarus) Belarus; Aliaksandr Dziadkou; Yauhen Vishneuski
Since 2013: U22
14	2013 (Note: From 2013 onwards, the tournament was changed from U23 to U22.)	Varna, Bulgaria	(Poland) Poland; Bartosz Łosiak; Piotr Kantor	(Norway) Norway; Lars Fredrik Tvinde; Hendrik Mol	(Poland) Poland; Maciej Kosiak; Maciej Rudol
15	2014	Fethiye, Turkey	(Norway) Norway; Runar Sannarnes; Christian Sørum	(Switzerland) Switzerland; Nico Beeler; Marco Krattiger	(Austria) Austria; Christoph Dressler; Benedikt Kattner
16	2015	Macedo de Cavaleiros, Portugal	(Poland) Poland; Michał Bryl; Kacper Kujawiak	(France) France; Romain Di Giantommaso; Maxime Thiercy	(Russia) Russia; Igor Velichko; Maxim Sivolap
17	2016	Thessaloniki, Greece	(Norway) Norway; Anders Mol; Christian Sørum	(Austria) Austria; Moritz Pristauz; Maximilian Trummer	(France) France; Arnaud Gauthier-Rat; Arnaud Loiseau
18	2017	Baden, Austria	(Russia) Russia; Oleg Stoyanovskiy; Artem Yarzutkin	(Norway) Norway; Mathias Berntsen; Anders Mol	(Austria) Austria; Moritz Pristauz; Paul Buchegger
19	2018	Jūrmala, Latvia	(Latvia) Latvia; Kristaps Šmits; Mihails Samoilovs	(Spain) Spain; Alejandro Huerta; Javier Huerta	(Lithuania) Lithuania; Audrius Knašas; Patrikas Stankevičius
20	2019	Antalya, Turkey	(Russia) Russia; Alexey Gusev; Pavel Shustrov	(Germany) Germany; Lukas Pfretzschner; Robin Sowa	(France) France; Timothée Platre; Théo Faure
21	2020	İzmir, Turkey	(Russia) Russia; Alexey Gusev; Pavel Shustrov	(Poland) Poland; Miłosz Kruk; Mikołaj Miszczuk	(Germany) Germany; Mio Wüst; Rudy Schneider
22	2021	Baden, Austria	(Sweden) Sweden; David Åhman; Jonatan Hellvig	(Latvia) Latvia; Arturs Rinkēvičs; Ardis Bedrītis	(Russia) Russia; Alexey Gusev; Pavel Shustrov
23	2022	Vlissingen, Netherlands	(Sweden) Sweden; David Åhman; Jacob Hölting Nilsson	(Latvia) Latvia; Kristians Fokerots; Arturs Rinkēvičs	(Austria) Austria; Timo Hammarberg; Laurenc Grössig
24	2023	Timișoara, Romania	(Norway) Norway; Markus Mol; Jo Sunde	(Germany) Germany; Maximilian Just; Lui Wüst	(Latvia) Latvia; Olivers Bulgačs; Kristians Fokerots
25	2024	Termal, Turkey	(Sweden) Sweden; Jacob Hölting Nilsson; Elmer Andersson	(Norway) Norway; Adrian Mol; Even Stray Aas	(France) France; Arthur Canet; Téo Rotar
26	2025	Baden, Austria	(France) France; Arthur Canet; Téo Rotar	(Latvia) Latvia; Olivers Bulgačs; Kristiāns Fokerots	(Austria) Austria; Timo Hammarberg; Tim Berger
27	2026	Madrid, Spain	(Latvia) Latvia; Gustavs Auziņš; Kristians Fokerots	(Lithuania) Lithuania; Povilas Piešina; Dovydas Sinkevičius	(Norway) Norway; Even Stray Aas; Sebastian Kjemperud

=== Women ===
#	Year	Location	Gold	Silver	Bronze
1999–2012: U23
1	1999	(Greece)	(Latvia)	(Austria)	(Sweden) / (Romania)
2	2000	(San Marino)	(Czech Republic)	(Latvia)	(Latvia)
3	2001	(Portugal)	(Russia)	(Czech Republic)	(Spain)
–	2002	Not held	Not held	Not held	Not held
4	2003	(Poland)	(Czech Republic)	(Germany)	(Greece)
5	2004	(Czech Republic)	(Finland)	(Switzerland)	(Germany)
6	2005	(Poland)	(Germany)	(Germany)	(Czech Republic)
7	2006	(Austria)	(Germany)	(Germany)	(Austria)
8	2007	(Cyprus)	(Germany)	(Czech Republic)	(Netherlands)
9	2008	(Portugal)	(Russia)	(Czech Republic)	(Poland)
10	2009	(Russia)	(Germany)	(Czech Republic)	(Germany)
11	2010	Kos, Greece	(Czech Republic) Czech Republic; Kristýna Kolocová; Markéta Sluková	(Italy) Italy; Marta Menegatti; Laura Giombini	(Russia) Russia; Elizaveta Ryabova; Irina Chaika
12	2011	Porto, Portugal	(Netherlands) Netherlands; Rimke Braakman; Michelle Stiekema	(Poland) Poland; Kinga Kołosińska; Monika Brzostek	(Germany) Germany; Chantal Laboureur; Kira Walkenhorst
13	2012	Assen, Netherlands	(Germany) Germany; Chantal Laboureur; Kira Walkenhorst	(Russia) Russia; Irina Chaika; Yulia Abalakina	(Germany) Germany; Christine Aulenbrock; Victoria Bieneck
Since 2013: U22
14	2013 (Note: From 2013 onwards, the tournament was changed from U23 to U22.)	Varna, Bulgaria	(Switzerland) Switzerland; Nina Betschart; Anouk Vergé-Dépré	(Spain) Spain; Ángela Lobato; Paula Soria	(Czech Republic) Czech Republic; Hana Třešňáková; Eliška Gálová
15	2014	Fethiye, Turkey	(Poland) Poland; Karolina Baran; Jagoda Gruszczyńska	(Poland) Poland; Katarzyna Kociołek; Dorota Strąg	(Switzerland) Switzerland; Nicole Eiholzer; Dunja Gerson
16	2015	Macedo de Cavaleiros, Portugal	(Switzerland) Switzerland; Nina Betschart; Nicole Eiholzer	(Poland) Poland; Katarzyna Kociołek; Dorota Strąg	(Lithuania) Lithuania; Monika Povilaitytė; Ieva Dumbauskaitė
17	2016	Thessaloniki, Greece	(Latvia) Latvia; Anastasija Kravčenoka; Tīna Graudiņa	(Poland) Poland; Katarzyna Kociołek; Jagoda Gruszczyńska	(Germany) Germany; Lisa Arnholdt; Nadja Glenzke
18	2017	Baden, Austria	(Russia) Russia; Nadezda Makroguzova; Svetlana Kholomina	(Romania) Romania; Adriana Matei; Beata Vaida	(Germany) Germany; Lisa Arnholdt; Leonie Welsch
19	2018	Jūrmala, Latvia	(Russia) Russia; Nadezda Makroguzova; Svetlana Kholomina	(Latvia) Latvia; Anastasija Kravčenoka; Tīna Graudiņa	(Spain) Spain; Daniela Álvarez; María Belén Carro
20	2019	Antalya, Turkey	(Russia) Russia; Maria Bocharova; Maria Voronina	(Germany) Germany; Julika Hoffmann; Sarah Schulz	(Spain) Spain; Daniela Álvarez; María Belén Carro
21	2020	İzmir, Turkey	(Russia) Russia; Anastasiia Frolova; Aleksandra Ganenko	(Russia) Russia; Maria Voronina; Maria Bocharova	(Switzerland) Switzerland; Esmée Böbner; Mara Betschart
22	2021	Baden, Austria	(Russia) Russia; Maria Voronina; Maria Bocharova	(Netherlands) Netherlands; Raïsa Schoon; Emi van Driel	(Ukraine) Ukraine; Anhelina Khmil; Tetiana Lazarenko
23	2022	Vlissingen, Netherlands	(Spain) Spain; Daniela Álvarez; Tania Moreno	(Denmark) Denmark; Clara Windeleff; Sofia Bisgaard	(Ukraine) Ukraine; Anhelina Khmil; Tetiana Lazarenko
24	2023	Timișoara, Romania	(Lithuania) Lithuania; Danielė Kvedaraitė; Ariana Rudkovskaja	(Czech Republic) Czech Republic; Kylie Neuschaeferová; Markéta Svozilová	(Spain) Spain; Sofía Izuzquiza; Ana Vergara
25	2024	Termal, Turkey	(Czech Republic) Czech Republic; Katerina Pavelková; Anna Pavelková	(Poland) Poland; Małgorzata Ciężkowska; Urszula Łunio	(Latvia) Latvia; Līva Ēbere; Deniela Konstantinova
26	2025	Baden, Austria	(Ukraine) Ukraine; Yeva Serdiuk; Daria Romaniuk	(Czech Republic) Czech Republic; Katerina Pavelková; Anna Pavelková	(Poland) Poland; Małgorzata Ciężkowska; Urszula Łunio
27	2026	Madrid, Spain	(Netherlands) Netherlands; Nigella Negenman; Floor Hogenhout	(Latvia) Latvia; Līva Ēbere; Deniela Konstantinova	(Czech Republic) Czech Republic; Katerina Pavelková; Anna Pavelková

== Medals (total) ==
Rank	Nation	Gold	Silver	Bronze	Total
1	Russia	11	3	7	21
2	Germany	9	11	12	32
3	Poland	5	8	4	17
4	Latvia	5	6	4	15
5	Czech Republic	4	6	3	13
6	Spain	3	4	4	11
7	Norway	3	3	1	7
8	Sweden	3	0	1	4
9	Switzerland	2	2	2	6
10	Netherlands	2	1	1	4
11	Ukraine	2	0	2	4
12	Austria	1	2	5	8
13	France	1	1	3	5
14	Lithuania	1	1	2	4
15	Finland	1	1	0	2
16	Portugal	1	0	0	1
17	Italy	0	2	1	3
18	Greece	0	1	2	3
19	Romania	0	1	1	2
20	Denmark	0	1	0	1
21	Belarus	0	0	1	1
Totals (21 entries)		54	54	56	164

== See also ==
- European Beach Volleyball Championships
- Nestea European Championship Tour
- Beach Volleyball Major Series
- FIVB Beach Volleyball World Tour
- FIVB Beach Volleyball World Championships
- FIVB Beach Volleyball U23 World Championships
- FIVB Beach Volleyball U21 World Championships
- FIVB Beach Volleyball U19 World Championships
- FIVB Beach Volleyball U17 World Championships
- 2022–2024 CEV Beach Volleyball Continental Cup
- 2018–2020 CEV Beach Volleyball Continental Cup
- 2014–2016 CEV Beach Volleyball Continental Cup
- 2010–2012 CEV Beach Volleyball Continental Cup
- European Beach Volleyball Club Cups
- European Snow Volleyball Championships
- European Beach Volleyball Nations Cups
- Beach Volleyball at the European Games
- European Beach Volleyball Continental Cups
