= 2021 FIVB Beach Volleyball World Tour =

Beach volleyball competition series

Tournament details
- Host country: Various
- Dates: February – November 2021
- Venues: 23 (in 23 host cities)

The 2021 FIVB Beach Volleyball World Tour was the final edition of the global elite professional beach volleyball circuit organized by the Fédération Internationale de Volleyball (FIVB) for the 2021 beach volleyball season. When it started in late February 2021, it comprised eight FIVB World Tour 4-star tournaments, three 2-star events, 17 categorized as 1-star and the World Tour Finals, all organized by the FIVB.

The full calendar of events was updated on September 13, 2021.

== Schedule ==
Key

World Tour Finals
5-star tournament/Major Series
4-star tournament
3-star tournament
2-star tournament
1-star tournament

=== Men ===
| Tournament | Champions | Runners-up | Third place | Fourth place |
|---|---|---|---|---|
| World Tour Doha 1 Star; Doha, Qatar; US$5,000; 23–26 February 2021 | Cherif Younousse (QAT); Ahmed Tijan (QAT); 21–15, 21–19 | Quentin Métral (SUI); Yves Haussener (SUI) | Pavel Shustrov (RUS); Alexey Gusev (RUS); 19–21, 21–15, 19–17 | Murat Giginoğlu (TUR); Volkan Gögtepe (TUR) |
| Katara Beach Volleyball Cup; Doha, Qatar; US$150,000; 8–12 March 2021 | Ondřej Perušič (CZE); David Schweiner (CZE); 21–16, 21–19 | Evandro Oliveira (BRA); Gustavo Carvalhaes (BRA) | Jake Gibb (USA); Taylor Crabb (USA); 21–9, 23–21 | Nick Lucena (USA); Phil Dalhausser (USA) |
| Cancún Hub – 1st event Cancún, Mexico; US$150,000; 15–20 April 2021 | Anders Mol (NOR); Christian Sørum (NOR); 21–19, 22–20 | Cherif Younousse (QAT); Ahmed Tijan (QAT) | Ondřej Perušič (CZE); David Schweiner (CZE); 21–18, 21–12 | Martin Ermacora (AUT); Moritz Pristauz (AUT) |
| Cancún Hub – 2nd event Cancún, Mexico; US$150,000; 21–26 April 2021 | Anders Mol (NOR); Christian Sørum (NOR); 21–18, 21–18 | Cherif Younousse (QAT); Ahmed Tijan (QAT) | Alison Cerutti (BRA); Álvaro Morais Filho (BRA); 21–17, 21–17 | Adrian Carambula (ITA); Enrico Rossi (ITA) |
| Cancún Hub – 3rd event Cancún, Mexico; US$150,000; 27 April–2 May 2021 | Cherif Younousse (QAT); Ahmed Tijan (QAT); 21–15, 21–12 | Konstantin Semenov (RUS); Ilya Leshukov (RUS) | Nick Lucena (USA); Phil Dalhausser (USA); 21–19, 21–15 | Adrian Carambula (ITA); Enrico Rossi (ITA) |
| Sofia Beach Open 1 Sofia, Bulgaria; US$5,000; 20–23 May 2021 | Aleksandr Kramarenko (RUS); Maksim Hudyakov (RUS); 21–18, 21–13 | Maciej Rudol (POL); Jakub Nowak (POL) | João Pedrosa (POR); Hugo Campos (POR); 25–23, 21–15 | Jędrzej Brożyniak (POL); Piotr Janiak (POL) |
| FIVB Beach Volleyball WT Sochi; Sochi, Russia; US$150,000; 25–30 May 2021 | Piotr Kantor (POL); Bartosz Łosiak (POL); 17–21, 23–21, 15–10 | Cherif Younousse (QAT); Ahmed Tijan (QAT) | Steven van de Velde (NED); Christiaan Varenhorst (NED); 21–16, 26–28, 15–9 | Adrian Carambula (ITA); Enrico Rossi (ITA) |
| J&T Banka Ostrava Beach Open; Ostrava, Czech Republic; US$150,000; 2–6 June 2021 | Alexander Brouwer (NED); Robert Meeuwsen (NED); 13–21, 21–19, 15–13 | Ondřej Perušič (CZE); David Schweiner (CZE) | George Wanderley (BRA); André Stein (BRA); 27–25, 21–18 | Viacheslav Krasilnikov (RUS); Oleg Stoyanovskiy (RUS) |
| Sofia Beach Open 2 Sofia, Bulgaria; US$5,000; 10–13 June 2021 | Petr Bakhnar (RUS); Valeriy Samoday (RUS); 21–17, 21–19 | João Pedrosa (POR); Hugo Campos (POR) | Samuele Cottafava (ITA); Gianluca Dal Corso (ITA); 21–19, 23–21 | Jakob Windisch (ITA); Tobia Marchetto (ITA) |
| FIVB Beach Volleyball WT Gstaad; Gstaad, Switzerland; US$150,000; 6–10 July 2021 | Stefan Boermans (NED); Yorick de Groot (NED); 23–21, 19–21, 15–10 | Cherif Younousse (QAT); Ahmed Tijan (QAT) | Viacheslav Krasilnikov (RUS); Oleg Stoyanovskiy (RUS); 21–16, 21–12 | Nikita Lyamin (RUS); Taras Myskiv (RUS) |
| FIVB Beach Volleyball WT Rubavu; Rubavu, Rwanda; US$25,000; 14–18 July 2021 | Theo Brunner (USA); Chaim Schalk (USA); 25–23, 21–15 | Chase Budinger (USA); Troy Field (USA) | Maksim Hudyakov (RUS); Aleksandr Kramarenko (RUS); 21–11, 21–15 | Anton Kislytsyn (RUS); Daniil Kuvichka (RUS) |
| Leuven Open; Leuven, Belgium; US$5,000; 15–18 July 2021 | Dries Koekelkoren (BEL); Tom van Walle (BEL); 20–22, 21–18, 15–13 | Arnaud Loiseau (FRA); Tom Altwies (FRA) | Danijel Pokeršnik (SLO); Črtomir Bošnjak (SLO); 21–10, 17–21, 15–11 | Timothée Platre (FRA); Liam Patte (FRA) |
| Sofia Beach Open 3 Sofia, Bulgaria; US$5,000; 15–18 July 2021 | Mateusz Florczyk (POL); Jakub Szałankiewicz (POL); 17–21, 21–14, 15–0 | Vinícius Cardozo (BRA); Matheus Maia (BRA) | Petr Bakhnar (RUS); Valeriy Samoday (RUS); 21–19, 21–16 | Miloš Milić (SRB); Lazar Kolarić (SRB) |
| Ljubljana Open; Ljubljana, Slovenia; US$5,000; 29 July–1 August 2021 | Patrikas Stankevičius (LIT); Audrius Knašas (LIT); 21–14, 21–12 | Alan Košenina (SLO); Rok Bračko (SLO) | Miloš Milić (SRB); Lazar Kolarić (SRB); 21–19, 21–16 | Martin Appelgren (SWE); Alexander Herrmann (SWE) |
| Sofia Beach Open 4 Sofia, Bulgaria; US$5,000; 5–8 August 2021 | Dirk Boehlé (NED); Mart van Werkhoven (NED); 21–12, 10–21, 16–14 | Gianluca Dal Corso (ITA); Tobia Marchetto (ITA) | Tiziano Andreatta (ITA); Andrea Abbiati (ITA); 29–31, 21–18, 15–9 | Dmitrii Veretiuk (RUS); Artem Yarzutkin (RUS) |
| World Tour 1 Star Cortegaça; Cortegaça, Portugal; US$5,000; 12–15 August 2021 | Javier Bello (ENG); Joaquin Bello (ENG); 17–21, 21–15, 15–8 | João Pedrosa (POR); Hugo Campos (POR) | Roberto Reis (POR); Sebastião Alves (POR); 16–21, 21–17, 15–9 | Jakob Reiter (AUT); Michael Murauer (AUT) |
| Prague Open; Prague, Czech Republic; US$25,000; 19–22 August 2021 | Ondřej Perušič (CZE); David Schweiner (CZE); 21–17, 17–21, 15–9 | Philipp Bergmann (GER); Yannick Harms (GER) | David Åhman (SWE); Jonatan Hellvig (SWE); 21–17, 19–21, 15–8 | Kristoffer Abell (DEN); Jacob Brinck (DEN) |
| Budapest Open; Budapest, Hungary; US$5,000; 19–22 August 2021 | Jyrki Nurminen (FIN); Santeri Sirén (FIN); 21–19, 21–17 | Gianluca Dal Corso (ITA); Tobia Marchetto (ITA) | Eylon Elazar (ISR); Netanel Ohana (ISR); 15–21, 21–15, 17–15 | Miloš Milić (SRB); Lazar Kolarić (SRB) |
| Montpellier Open; Montpellier, France; US$5,000; 24–29 August 2021 | Quincy Ayé (FRA); Arnaud Gauthier-Rat (FRA); 14–21, 26–24, 15–13 | Đorđe Klašnić (SRB); Lazar Kolarić (SRB) | Ardis Bedrītis (LAT); Arturs Rinkēvičs (LAT); 11–21, 21–12, 15–6 | Felix Friedl (AUT); Maximilian Trummer (AUT) |
| World Tour 1 Star Warsaw; Warsaw, Poland; US$5,000; 2–5 September 2021 | Jyrki Nurminen (FIN); Santeri Sirén (FIN); 21–10, 21–15 | Miłosz Kruk (POL); Jakub Szałankiewicz (POL) | Leon Luini (NED); Thijs Nijeboer (NED); 21–14, 21–19 | River Day (ISR); Kevin Cuzmiciov (ISR) |
| World Tour 1 Star Apeldoorn; Apeldoorn, Netherlands; US$5,000; 8–12 September 2021 | Jakub Zdybek (POL); Paweł Lewandowski (POL); 21–19, 16–21, 15–12 | Ruben Penninga (NED); Matthew Immers (NED) | Tomás Capogrosso (ARG); Bautista Amieva (ARG); 21–11, 21–16 | Lui Wüst (GER); Robin Sowa (GER) |
| World Tour 1 Star Cervia; Cervia, Italy; US$5,000; 9–12 September 2021 | Jakob Windisch (ITA); Samuele Cottafava (ITA); 23–21, 21–16 | Miles Evans (USA); Troy Field (USA) | Jyrki Nurminen (FIN); Santeri Sirén (FIN); 21–14, 21–16 | Maximilian Trummer (AUT); Felix Friedl (AUT) |
| World Tour 1 Star Nijmegen; Nijmegen, Netherlands; US$5,000; 16–19 September 2021 | Miles Evans (USA); Troy Field (USA); 21–17, 21–15 | Stefan Boermans (NED); Sam van der Loo (NED) | Javier Bello (ENG); Joaquin Bello (ENG); 21–18, 19–21, 15–11 | Julian Hörl (AUT); Florian Schnetzer (AUT) |
| World Tour Finals; Cagliari, Italy; US$300,000; 6–10 October 2021 | Anders Mol (NOR); Christian Sørum (NOR); 22–20, 23–21 | Ondřej Perušič (CZE); David Schweiner (CZE) | Steven van de Velde (NED); Christiaan Varenhorst (NED); 23–21, 21–17 | Paolo Nicolai (ITA); Daniele Lupo (ITA) |
| FIVB Beach Volleyball WT Itapema; Itapema, Brazil; US$150,000; 10–14 November 2021 | George Wanderley (BRA); André Stein (BRA); 29–27, 21–17 | Vitor Felipe (BRA); Renato Carvalho (BRA) | Christoph Dressler (AUT); Alexander Huber (AUT); 16–21, 21–17, 16–14 | Alex Ranghieri (ITA); Daniele Lupo (ITA) |

=== Women ===
| Tournament | Champions | Runners-up | Third place | Fourth place |
|---|---|---|---|---|
| Katara Beach Volleyball Cup; Doha, Qatar; US$150,000; 8–12 March 2021 | April Ross (USA); Alix Klineman (USA); 22–20, 21–18 | Sarah Pavan (CAN); Melissa Humana-Paredes (CAN) | Ágatha Bednarczuk (BRA); Eduarda Santos Lisboa (BRA); 21–13, 21–14 | Kelley Kolinske (USA); Emily Stockman (USA) |
| Cancún Hub – 1st event Cancún, Mexico; US$150,000; 15–20 April 2021 | Taiana Lima (BRA); Talita Antunes (BRA); 19–21, 24–22, 15–10 | Sarah Pavan (CAN); Melissa Humana-Paredes (CAN) | Ágatha Bednarczuk (BRA); Eduarda Santos Lisboa (BRA); 37–35, 21–16 | Chantal Laboureur (GER); Cinja Tillmann (GER) |
| Cancún Hub – 2nd event Cancún, Mexico; US$150,000; 21–26 April 2021 | Ágatha Bednarczuk (BRA); Eduarda Santos Lisboa (BRA); 21–15, 21–19 | Nadezda Makroguzova (RUS); Svetlana Kholomina (RUS) | April Ross (USA); Alix Klineman (USA); 21–17, 21–17 | Sanne Keizer (NED); Madelein Meppelink (NED) |
| Cancún Hub – 3rd event Cancún, Mexico; US$150,000; 27 April–2 May 2021 | Taliqua Clancy (AUS); Mariafe Artacho del Solar (AUS); 19–21, 22–20, 16–14 | Ágatha Bednarczuk (BRA); Eduarda Santos Lisboa (BRA) | April Ross (USA); Alix Klineman (USA); 21–16, 21–15 | Sarah Pavan (CAN); Melissa Humana-Paredes (CAN) |
| Sofia Beach Open 1 Sofia, Bulgaria; US$5,000; 20–23 May 2021 | Alexandra Wheeler (USA); Corinne Quiggle (USA); 21–18, 21–16 | Norisbeth Agudo (VEN); Gabriela Brito (VEN) | Dorina Klinger (AUT); Ronja Klinger (AUT); 21–17, 21–14 | Erika Nyström (CYP); Daria Gusarova (CYP) |
| FIVB Beach Volleyball WT Sochi; Sochi, Russia; US$150,000; 25–29 May 2021 | Kelly Claes (USA); Sarah Sponcil (USA); 21–19, 21–17 | Tanja Hüberli (SUI); Nina Betschart (SUI) | Nadezda Makroguzova (RUS); Svetlana Kholomina (RUS); 21–18, 21–11 | Tina Graudiņa (LAT); Anastasija Kravčenoka (LAT) |
| J&T Banka Ostrava Beach Open; Ostrava, Czech Republic; US$150,000; 2–6 June 2021 | Kelly Claes (USA); Sarah Sponcil (USA); 21–18, 21–15 | Anouk Vergé-Dépré (SUI); Joana Heidrich (SUI) | Carolina Solberg Salgado (BRA); Bárbara Seixas (BRA); 21–15, 21–16 | Sarah Pavan (CAN); Melissa Humana-Paredes (CAN) |
| Sofia Beach Open 2 Sofia, Bulgaria; US$5,000; 10–13 June 2021 | Anhelina Khmil (UKR); Tetiana Lazarenko (UKR); 21–17, 21–15 | Norisbeth Agudo (VEN); Gabriela Brito (VEN) | Alexandra Wheeler (USA); Corinne Quiggle (USA); 21–15, 21–11 | Dorina Klinger (AUT); Ronja Klinger (AUT) |
| FIVB Beach Volleyball WT Gstaad; Gstaad, Switzerland; US$150,000; 6–11 July 2021 | Ágatha Bednarczuk (BRA); Eduarda Santos Lisboa (BRA); 23–21, 21–18 | Ana Patrícia Ramos (BRA); Rebecca Cavalcanti (BRA) | Sarah Pavan (CAN); Melissa Humana-Paredes (CAN); 21–13, 13–21, 17–15 | Tīna Graudiņa (LAT); Anastasija Kravčenoka (LAT) |
| FIVB Beach Volleyball WT Rubavu; Rubavu, Rwanda; US$25,000; 14–18 July 2021 | Sara Hughes (USA); Emily Day (USA); 19–21, 21–13, 16–14 | Chantal Laboureur (GER); Sarah Schulz (GER) | Svenja Müller (GER); Sarah Schneider (GER); 21–19, 21–19 | Valentyna Davidova (UKR); Diana Lunina (UKR) |
| World Tour Star 1 Leuven; Leuven, Belgium; US$5,000; 15–18 July 2021 | Susannah Muno (USA); Christian Jones (USA); 17–21, 21–11, 18–16 | Anna-Lena Grüne (GER); Chenoa Christ (GER) | Sarah Cools (BEL); Lisa van den Vonder (BEL); 21–18, 21–15 | Maud Catry (BEL); Els Vandesteene (BEL) |
| Sofia Beach Open 3 Sofia, Bulgaria; US$5,000; 22–25 July 2021 | Margherita Bianchin (ITA); Claudia Scampoli (ITA); 21–12, 21–18 | Sophie Bukovec (CAN); Camille Saxton (CAN) | Sarah Cools (BEL); Lisa van den Vonder (BEL) w/o | Inna Makhno (UKR); Anna Shumeiko (UKR) |
| World Tour Star 1 Ljubljana; Ljubljana, Slovenia; US$5,000; 29 July–1 August 2021 | Martina Williams (CZE); Marie-Sára Štochlová (CZE); 21–18, 27–25 | Emi van Driel (NED); Mexime van Driel (NED) | Margherita Bianchin (ITA); Claudia Scampoli (ITA); 21–18, 21–19 | Sarah Cools (BEL); Lisa van den Vonder (BEL) |
| Sofia Beach Open 4 Sofia, Bulgaria; US$5,000; 5–8 August 2021 | Heleene Hollas (EST); Liisa Soomets (EST); 21–17, 21–18 | Chiara They (ITA); Margherita Bianchin (ITA) | Sara Breidenbach (ITA); Claudia Scampoli (ITA); 21–16, 21–14 | Jagoda Gruszczyńska (POL); Kinga Legieta (POL) |
| World Tour Star 1 Cortegaça; Cortegaça, Portugal; US$5,000; 12–15 August 2021 | Alice Zeimann (NZL); Shaunna Polley (NZL); 19–21, 21–15, 15–7 | Emma Piersma (NED); Brecht Piersma (NED) | Nazaret Florián (ESP); Nuria Bouza (ESP); 21–17, 22–20 | Wies Bekhuis (NED); Nadine Everaert (NED) |
| World Tour Star 2 Budapest; Prague, Czech Republic; US$25,000; 19–22 August 2021 | Elize Maia (BRA); Thamela Galil (BRA); 21–18, 21–16 | Esmée Böbner (SUI); Zoé Vergé-Dépré (SUI) | Andressa Ramalho (BRA); Vitória Rodrigues (BRA); 21–19, 21–18 | Valentyna Davidova (UKR); Diana Lunina (UKR) |
| World Tour Star 1 Budapest; Budapest, Hungary; US$5,000; 19–22 August 2021 | Chiara They (ITA); Sara Breidenbach (ITA); 21–13, 21–17 | Erika Nyström (CYP); Daria Gusarova (CYP) | Anhelina Khmil (UKR); Tetiana Lazarenko (UKR); 21–19, 23–25, 15–12 | Sofia Starikov (ISR); Anita Dave (ISR) |
| World Tour Star 2 Brno; Brno, Czech Republic; US$25,000; 26–29 August 2021 | Betsi Flint (USA); Emily Day (USA); 21–13, 21–8 | Martina Williams (CZE); Marie-Sára Štochlová (CZE) | Cinja Tillmann (GER); Svenja Müller (GER); 21–14, 22–20 | Alice Zeimann (NZL); Shaunna Polley (NZL) |
| Koropiv Hutir Cup; Koropove, Ukraine; US$5,000; 2–5 September 2021 | Sofia Starikov (ISR); Anita Dave (ISR); 23–21, 21–16 | Franziska Friedl (AUT); Eva Pfeffer (AUT) | Anhelina Khmil (UKR); Tetiana Lazarenko (UKR); 21–10, 21–14 | Veronika Zhukova (UKR); Anastasiya Nagorna (UKR) |
| World Tour 1 Star Apeldoorn; Apeldoorn, Netherlands; US$5,000; 8–12 September 2021 | Anna-Lena Grüne (GER); Sarah Schulz (GER); 23–21, 21–11 | Esmee Priem (NED); Iris Reinders (NED) | Lea Kunst (GER); Nele Schmitt (GER); 21–16, 21–15 | Wies Bekhuis (NED); Nadine Everaert (NED) |
| World Tour 1 Star Cervia; Cervia, Italy; US$5,000; 9–12 September 2021 | Chiara They (ITA); Sara Breidenbach (ITA); 22–20, 18–21, 15–12 | Molly Turner (USA); Terese Cannon (USA) | Tjaša Kotnik (SLO); Tajda Lovšin (SLO); 21–13, 21–15 | Giulia Rubini (ITA); Giada Godenzoni (ITA) |
| World Tour 1 Star Madrid; Madrid, Spain; US$5,000; 16–19 September 2021 | Paula Soria (ESP); María Belén Carro (ESP); 21–14, 21–15 | Tjaša Kotnik (SLO); Tajda Lovšin (SLO) | Anhelina Khmil (UKR); Tetiana Lazarenko (UKR); 17–21, 21–18, 15–13 | Ida Sinisalo (FIN); Sara Sinisalo (FIN) |
| World Tour 1 Star Nijmegen; Nijmegen, Netherlands; US$5,000; 16–19 September 2021 | Delaney Knudsen (USA); Terese Cannon (USA); 21–14, 18–21, 15–8 | Anna-Lena Grüne (GER); Sarah Schulz (GER) | Annik Stähli (SUI); Mara Betschart (SUI); 13–21, 21–19, 15–11 | Aline Chamereau (FRA); Clémence Vieira (FRA) |
| World Tour Finals; Cagliari, Italy; US$300,000; 6–10 October 2021 | Julia Sude (GER); Karla Borger (GER); 21–13, 23–21 | Sarah Pavan (CAN); Melissa Humana-Paredes (CAN) | April Ross (USA); Alix Klineman (USA); 21–8, 21–17 | Nadezda Makroguzova (RUS); Svetlana Kholomina (RUS) |
| FIVB Beach Volleyball WT Itapema; Itapema, Brazil; US$150,000; 10–14 November 2021 | Ágatha Bednarczuk (BRA); Eduarda Santos Lisboa (BRA); 25–23, 21–13 | Taiana Lima (BRA); Hegeile Almeida (BRA) | Terese Cannon (USA); Sara Hughes (USA); 9–21, 21–18, 15–9 | Tainá Silva (BRA); Victoria Tosta (BRA) |

== Medal table by country ==
| Rank | Nation | Gold | Silver | Bronze | Total |
|---|---|---|---|---|---|
| 1 | United States | 10 | 3 | 7 | 20 |
| 2 | Brazil | 6 | 6 | 6 | 18 |
| 3 | Italy | 4 | 3 | 4 | 11 |
| 4 | Netherlands | 3 | 5 | 3 | 11 |
| 5 | Czech Republic | 3 | 3 | 1 | 7 |
| 6 | Poland | 3 | 2 | 0 | 5 |
| 7 | Norway | 3 | 0 | 0 | 3 |
| 8 | Germany | 2 | 4 | 3 | 9 |
| 9 | Qatar | 2 | 4 | 0 | 6 |
| 10 | Russia | 2 | 2 | 5 | 9 |
| 11 | Finland | 2 | 0 | 1 | 3 |
| 12 | France | 1 | 1 | 0 | 2 |
| 13 | Ukraine | 1 | 0 | 3 | 4 |
| 14 | Belgium | 1 | 0 | 2 | 3 |
| 15 | England | 1 | 0 | 1 | 2 |
| 15 | Israel | 1 | 0 | 1 | 2 |
| 15 | Spain | 1 | 0 | 1 | 2 |
| 18 | Australia | 1 | 0 | 0 | 1 |
| 18 | Estonia | 1 | 0 | 0 | 1 |
| 18 | Lithuania | 1 | 0 | 0 | 1 |
| 18 | New Zealand | 1 | 0 | 0 | 1 |
| 22 | Canada | 0 | 4 | 1 | 5 |
| 22 | Switzerland | 0 | 4 | 1 | 5 |
| 24 | Portugal | 0 | 2 | 2 | 4 |
| 24 | Slovenia | 0 | 2 | 2 | 4 |
| 26 | Venezuela | 0 | 2 | 0 | 2 |
| 27 | Austria | 0 | 1 | 2 | 3 |
| 28 | Serbia | 0 | 1 | 1 | 2 |
| 29 | Cyprus | 0 | 1 | 0 | 1 |
| 30 | Argentina | 0 | 0 | 1 | 1 |
| 30 | Latvia | 0 | 0 | 1 | 1 |
| 30 | Sweden | 0 | 0 | 1 | 1 |
| Totals (32 entries) | | 50 | 50 | 50 | 150 |
