= 2022 European U20 Beach Volleyball Championships =

Tournament details
- Host country: (Turkey) İzmir
- Dates: 14–17 July
- Teams: 64

The 2022 European U20 Beach Volleyball Championships is a 2022 edition of European U20 Beach Volleyball Championships which is a unisex competition of national teams which took place from 14 to 17 July 2022 in İzmir in Turkey.

== Schedule ==
14 July	Pool matches (round 1 and 2)
15 July	Pool matches (round 2 and 3)
16 July	Final Phase
17 July	Semifinals and finals

== Medal summary ==
Event	Gold	Silver	Bronze
Men	Austria; Timo Hammarberg; Tim Berger	France; Arthur Canet; Téo Rotar	Germany; Momme Lorenz; Hennes Nissen
Women	Ukraine; Anhelina Khmil; Tetiana Lazarenko	Latvia; Daniela Konstantinova; Līva Ēbere	Netherlands; Brecht Piersma; Desy Poiesz

== Medal table ==
* Host nation (Turkey)

Rank	Nation	Gold	Silver	Bronze	Total
1	Austria	1	0	0	1
1	Ukraine	1	0	0	1
3	France	0	1	0	1
3	Latvia	0	1	0	1
5	Germany	0	0	1	1
5	Netherlands	0	0	1	1
Totals (6 entries)		2	2	2	6

== Men ==
=== Pool A ===
Pos	Team	Pld	W	L	Pts	SW	SL	SR	SPW	SPL	SPR	Qualification
1	Czachorowski – Lejawa (POL)	3	3	0	6	6	1	6.000	138	86	1.605	Round of 16
2	Güllük – Kuru (TUR)	3	2	1	5	5	2	2.500	129	119	1.084	Round of 24
3	Jurković – Devald (CRO)	3	1	2	4	2	4	0.500	100	119	0.840	Round of 24
4	Bielka – Vysoký (SVK)	3	0	3	3	0	6	0.000	83	126	0.659	

Source: CEV

Date	Time		Score		Set 1	Set 2	Set 3	Total	Report
14 Jul	12:30	Güllük – Kuru	2–0	Jurković – Devald	21–17	21–16		42–33	Report
14 Jul	12:30	Czachorowski – Lejawa	2–0	Bielka – Vysoký	21–8	21–8		42–16	Report
15 Jul	09:00	Güllük – Kuru	2–0	Bielka – Vysoký	21–16	21–16		42–32	Report
15 Jul	09:00	Czachorowski – Lejawa	2–0	Jurković – Devald	21–13	21–12		42–25	Report
15 Jul	16:00	Güllük – Kuru	1–1	Czachorowski – Lejawa	17–21	21–18	7–15	45–54	Report
15 Jul	16:00	Bielka – Vysoký	0–2	Jurković – Devald	19–21	16–21		35–42	

=== Pool B ===
Pos	Team	Pld	W	L	Pts	SW	SL	SR	SPW	SPL	SPR	Qualification
1	Vercauteren – Van Langendonck (BEL)	3	3	0	6	6	1	6.000	138	103	1.340	Round of 16
2	Hanni – Armellini (ITA)	3	2	1	5	4	3	1.333	122	123	0.992	Round of 24
3	Täht – Stog (EST)	3	1	2	4	4	4	1.000	143	144	0.993	Round of 24
4	Anton – Milcică (ROU)	3	0	3	3	0	6	0.000	96	129	0.744	

Source: CEV

Date	Time		Score		Set 1	Set 2	Set 3	Total	Report
14 Jul	12:30	Hanni – Armellini	2–0	Anton – Milcică	21–16	21–16		42–32	Report
14 Jul	12:30	Vercauteren – Van Langendonck	2–1	Täht – Stog	18–21	21–18	15–10	54–49	Report
15 Jul	09:00	Hanni – Armellini	2–1	Täht – Stog	21–12	14–21	18–16	53–49	Report
15 Jul	09:00	Vercauteren – Van Langendonck	2–0	Anton – Milcică	21–15	21–12		42–27	Report
15 Jul	16:00	Hanni – Armellini	0–2	Vercauteren – Van Langendonck	14–21	13–21		27–42	Report
15 Jul	16:00	Täht – Stog	2–0	Anton – Milcică	24–22	21–15		45–37	Report

=== Pool C ===
Pos	Team	Pld	W	L	Pts	SW	SL	SR	SPW	SPL	SPR	Qualification
1	Oliva – Kurka (CZE)	3	3	0	6	6	2	3.000	147	128	1.148	Round of 16
2	Lorenz – Nissen (GER)	3	2	1	5	5	2	2.500	137	123	1.114	Round of 24
3	Kurt – Tür (TUR)	3	1	2	4	2	4	0.500	113	128	0.883	Round of 24
4	Vartigov – Popov (BUL)	3	0	3	3	1	6	0.167	123	141	0.872	

Source: CEV

Date	Time		Score		Set 1	Set 2	Set 3	Total	Report
14 Jul	13:20	Lorenz – Nissen	2–0	Kurt – Tür	24–22	21–12		45–34	Report
14 Jul	13:20	Oliva – Kurka	2–1	Vartigov – Popov	17–21	21–14	15–10	53–45	
15 Jul	09:45	Lorenz – Nissen	2–0	Vartigov – Popov	21–17	22–20		43–37	Report
15 Jul	09:45	Oliva – Kurka	2–0	Kurt – Tür	21–15	21–19		42–34	Report
15 Jul	16:50	Lorenz – Nissen	1–2	Oliva – Kurka	17–21	21–16	11–15	49–52	
15 Jul	16:50	Vartigov – Popov	0–2	Kurt – Tür	19–21	22–24		41–45	

=== Pool D ===
Pos	Team	Pld	W	L	Pts	SW	SL	SR	SPW	SPL	SPR	Qualification
1	Boiko – Savvin (UKR)	3	3	0	6	6	0	MAX	126	76	1.658	Round of 16
2	Pulkkinen – Vainio (FIN)	3	2	1	5	4	3	1.333	120	117	1.026	Round of 24
3	Kardoulias – Kaliozis (GRE)	3	1	2	4	2	4	0.500	97	110	0.882	Round of 24
4	Agassi – Laufer (ISR)	3	0	3	3	1	6	0.167	99	139	0.712	

Source: CEV

Date	Time		Score		Set 1	Set 2	Set 3	Total	Report
14 Jul	13:20	Boiko – Savvin	2–0	Pulkkinen – Vainio	21–11	21–12		42–23	Report
14 Jul	13:20	Agassi – Laufer	0–2	Kardoulias – Kaliozis	12–21	14–21		26–42	Report
15 Jul	09:45	Boiko – Savvin	2–0	Kardoulias – Kaliozis	21–15	21–10		42–25	Report
15 Jul	09:45	Agassi – Laufer	1–2	Pulkkinen – Vainio	21–19	15–21	9–15	45–55	Report
15 Jul	16:50	Boiko – Savvin	2–0	Agassi – Laufer	21–13	21–15		42–28	Report
15 Jul	16:50	Kardoulias – Kaliozis	0–2	Pulkkinen – Vainio	16–21	14–21		30–42	

=== Pool E ===
Pos	Team	Pld	W	L	Pts	SW	SL	SR	SPW	SPL	SPR	Qualification
1	Andersen – Hansen (DEN)	3	2	1	5	4	3	1.333	132	129	1.023	Round of 16
2	Hammarberg – Berger (AUT)	3	2	1	5	5	2	2.500	144	124	1.161	Round of 24
3	Groenewold – Sengers (NED)	3	2	1	5	4	3	1.333	132	120	1.100	Round of 24
4	Strazdas – Palubinskas (LTU)	3	0	3	3	1	6	0.167	106	134	0.791	

Source: CEV

Date	Time		Score		Set 1	Set 2	Set 3	Total	Report
14 Jul	14:10	Hammarberg – Berger	2–0	Strazdas – Palubinskas	21–13	21–14		42–27	Report
14 Jul	14:10	Groenewold – Sengers	0–2	Andersen – Hansen	19–21	14–21		33–42	
15 Jul	10:30	Groenewold – Sengers	2–0	Strazdas – Palubinskas	21–12	21–16		42–28	Report
15 Jul	10:30	Hammarberg – Berger	2–0	Andersen – Hansen	21–18	24–22		45–40	Report
15 Jul	17:40	Groenewold – Sengers	2–1	Hammarberg – Berger	21–17	21–23	15–10	57–50	Report
15 Jul	17:40	Strazdas – Palubinskas	1–2	Andersen – Hansen	19–21	21–14	11–15	51–50	Report

=== Pool F ===
Pos	Team	Pld	W	L	Pts	SW	SL	SR	SPW	SPL	SPR	Qualification
1	Canet – Rotar (FRA)	3	3	0	6	6	0	MAX	127	86	1.477	Round of 16
2	Fokerots – Bulgačs (LAT)	3	2	1	5	4	2	2.000	127	105	1.210	Round of 24
3	Dóczi – Udvarhelyi (HUN)	3	1	2	4	2	4	0.500	90	109	0.826	Round of 24
4	Bello – Soczewka (ENG)	1	0	1	1	0	2	0.000	25	42	0.595	

Source: CEV

Date	Time		Score		Set 1	Set 2	Set 3	Total	Report
14 Jul	14:10	Dóczi – Udvarhelyi	2–0	Bello – Soczewka	21–9	21–16		42–25	Report
14 Jul	14:10	Canet – Rotar	2–0	Fokerots – Bulgačs	21–17	22–20		43–37	Report
15 Jul	10:30	Dóczi – Udvarhelyi	0–2	Fokerots – Bulgačs	15–21	8–21		23–42	Report
15 Jul	10:30	Canet – Rotar	2–0	Bello – Soczewka	21–14	21–10		42–24	Report
15 Jul	17:40	Dóczi – Udvarhelyi	0–2	Canet – Rotar	14–21	11–21		25–42	Report
15 Jul	17:40	Fokerots – Bulgačs	2–0	Bello – Soczewka	21–14	27–25		48–39	

=== Pool G ===
Pos	Team	Pld	W	L	Pts	SW	SL	SR	SPW	SPL	SPR	Qualification
1	Ekstrand – Hölting Nilsson (SWE)	3	3	0	6	6	0	MAX	126	73	1.726	Round of 16
2	Bračko – Vinkovič (SLO)	3	2	1	5	4	2	2.000	116	99	1.172	Round of 24
3	Kaplan – Kesgin (TUR)	3	1	2	4	2	5	0.400	107	137	0.781	Round of 24
4	Đogić – Tomić (SRB)	3	0	3	3	1	6	0.167	99	139	0.712	

Source: CEV

Date	Time		Score		Set 1	Set 2	Set 3	Total	Report
14 Jul	15:00	Bračko – Vinkovič	2–0	Kaplan – Kesgin	21–13	21–16		42–29	Report
14 Jul	15:00	Ekstrand – Hölting Nilsson	2–0	Đogić – Tomić	21–12	21–6		42–18	Report
15 Jul	11:15	Bračko – Vinkovič	2–0	Đogić – Tomić	21–18	21–10		42–28	Report
15 Jul	11:15	Ekstrand – Hölting Nilsson	2–0	Kaplan – Kesgin	21–12	21–11		42–23	Report
15 Jul	18:30	Bračko – Vinkovič	0–2	Ekstrand – Hölting Nilsson	16–21	16–21		32–42	Report
15 Jul	18:30	Đogić – Tomić	1–2	Kaplan – Kesgin	19–21	21–19	13–15	53–55	

=== Pool H ===
Pos	Team	Pld	W	L	Pts	SW	SL	SR	SPW	SPL	SPR	Qualification
1	Klungsøyr – Sunde (NOR)	3	3	0	6	6	0	MAX	131	115	1.139	Round of 16
2	Kolb – Schalch (SUI)	3	2	1	5	4	2	2.000	123	95	1.295	Round of 24
3	Plămădeală – Romanov (MLD)	3	1	2	4	2	5	0.400	127	141	0.901	Round of 24
4	Viera – Tokarev (ESP)	3	0	3	3	1	6	0.167	110	140	0.786	

Source: CEV

Date	Time		Score		Set 1	Set 2	Set 3	Total	Report
14 Jul	15:00	Kolb – Schalch	2–0	Plămădeală – Romanov	21–10	21–19		42–29	Report
14 Jul	15:00	Viera – Tokarev	0–2	Klungsøyr – Sunde	16–21	18–21		34–42	Report
15 Jul	11:15	Kolb – Schalch	0–2	Klungsøyr – Sunde	19–21	20–22		39–43	Report
15 Jul	11:15	Viera – Tokarev	1–2	Plămădeală – Romanov	18–21	22–20	13–15	53–56	Report
15 Jul	18:30	Kolb – Schalch	2–0	Viera – Tokarev	21–15	21–8		42–23	
15 Jul	18:30	Klungsøyr – Sunde	2–0	Plămădeală – Romanov	21–19	25–23		46–42	Report

=== Classification 25-29 ===
Date	Time		Score		Set 1	Set 2	Set 3	Total	Report
16 Jul	15:40	Strazdas – Palubinskas	2–0	Vartigov – Popov	21–14	21–15		42–29	Report
16 Jul	15:40	Bielka – Vysoký	0–2	Agassi – Laufer	15–21	21–23		36–44	Report
16 Jul	16:30	Anton – Milcică	1–2	Viera – Tokarev	19–21	21–18	12–15	52–54	Report
16 Jul	16:30	Bello – Soczewka	WO	Đogić – Tomić					Report

=== Classification 17-21 ===
Date	Time		Score		Set 1	Set 2	Set 3	Total	Report
17 Jul	09:00	Bračko – Vinkovič	2–0	Plămădeală – Romanov	21–13	21–17		42–30	Report
17 Jul	09:00	Kaplan – Kesgin	0–2	Dóczi – Udvarhelyi	14–21	17–21		31–42	Report
17 Jul	09:45	Täht – Stog	2–0	Jurković – Devald	21–14	21–10		42–24	Report
17 Jul	09:45	Güllük – Kuru	2–0	Pulkkinen – Vainio	21–14	21–13		42–27	Report

=== Classification 9-13 ===
Date	Time		Score		Set 1	Set 2	Set 3	Total	Report
17 Jul	13:00	Kurt – Tür	2–1	Andersen – Hansen	10–21	21–13	15–12	46–46	Report
17 Jul	14:00	Boiko – Savvin	0–2	Fokerots – Bulgačs	23–25	21–23		44–48	Report
17 Jul	14:00	Kardoulias – Kaliozis	1–2	Klungsøyr – Sunde	19–21	21–19	4–15	44–55	Report
17 Jul	14:00	Hanni – Armellini	0–2	Groenewold – Sengers	13–21	13–21		26–42	Report

=== Classification 5-8 ===
Date	Time		Score		Set 1	Set 2	Set 3	Total	Report
17 Jul	11:00	Czachorowski – Lejawa	0–2	Ekstrand – Hölting Nilsson	14–21	17–21		31–42	Report
17 Jul	11:00	Kolb – Schalch	0–2	Vercauteren – Van Langendonck	8–21	19–21		27–42	Report

=== Final bracket ===
Round of 24
Pulkkinen – Vainio (FIN)	0
Kurt – Tür (TUR)	2
Bračko – Vinkovič (SLO)	1
Kardoulias – Kaliozis (GRE)	2
Fokerots – Bulgačs (LAT)	2
Jurković – Devald (CRO)	0
Hanni – Armellini (ITA)	2
Plămădeală – Romanov (MLD)	0
Hammarberg – Berger (AUT)	2
Täht – Stog (EST)	0
Kolb – Schalch (SUI)	2
Kaplan – Kesgin (TUR)	0
Lorenz – Nissen (GER)	2
Dóczi – Udvarhelyi (HUN)	0
Güllük – Kuru (TUR)	0
Groenewold – Sengers (NED)	2

Round of 16
Czachorowski – Lejawa (POL)	2
Kurt – Tür (TUR)	0
Canet – Rotar (FRA)	2
Kardoulias – Kaliozis (GRE)	0
Ekstrand – Hölting Nilsson (SWE)	2
Fokerots – Bulgačs (LAT)	0
Oliva – Kurka (CZE)	2
Hanni – Armellini (ITA)	0
Boiko – Savvin (UKR)	0
Hammarberg – Berger (AUT)	2
Andersen – Hansen (DEN)	0
Kolb – Schalch (SUI)	2
Klungsøyr – Sunde (NOR)	1
Lorenz – Nissen (GER)	2
Vercauteren – Van Langendonck (BEL)	2
Groenewold – Sengers (NED)	0

Quarterfinals
Czachorowski – Lejawa (POL)	0
Canet – Rotar (FRA)	2
Ekstrand – Hölting Nilsson (SWE)	1
Oliva – Kurka (CZE)	2
Hammarberg – Berger (AUT)	2
Kolb – Schalch (SUI)	1
Lorenz – Nissen (GER)	2
Vercauteren – Van Langendonck (BEL)	0

Semifinals
Canet – Rotar (FRA)	2
Oliva – Kurka (CZE)	1
Hammarberg – Berger (AUT)	2
Lorenz – Nissen (GER)	1

Final
Canet – Rotar (FRA)	1
Hammarberg – Berger (AUT)	2
3rd place
Oliva – Kurka (CZE)	0
Lorenz – Nissen (GER)	2

=== Round of 24 ===
Date	Time		Score		Set 1	Set 2	Set 3	Total	Report
16 Jul	09:00	Pulkkinen – Vainio	0–2	Kurt – Tür	18–21	20–22		38–42	Report
16 Jul	09:00	Bračko – Vinkovič	1–2	Kardoulias – Kaliozis	14–21	21–18	13–15	48–54	Report
16 Jul	09:50	Fokerots – Bulgačs	2–0	Jurković – Devald	21–11	21–16		42–27	Report
16 Jul	09:50	Hanni – Armellini	2–0	Plămădeală – Romanov	21–11	21–19		42–30	Report
16 Jul	10:40	Hammarberg – Berger	2–0	Täht – Stog	21–17	21–18		42–35	Report
16 Jul	10:40	Kolb – Schalch	2–0	Kaplan – Kesgin	21–8	21–15		42–23	Report
16 Jul	11:30	Lorenz – Nissen	2–0	Dóczi – Udvarhelyi	21–12	21–16		42–28	Report
16 Jul	11:30	Güllük – Kuru	0–2	Groenewold – Sengers	15–21	13–21		28–42	Report

=== Round of 16 ===
Date	Time		Score		Set 1	Set 2	Set 3	Total	Report
16 Jul	12:20	Czachorowski – Lejawa	2–0	Kurt – Tür	21–14	21–9		42–23	Report
16 Jul	12:20	Canet – Rotar	2–0	Kardoulias – Kaliozis	21–15	21–15		42–30	Report
16 Jul	13:10	Ekstrand – Hölting Nilsson	2–0	Fokerots – Bulgačs	21–17	21–19		42–36	Report
16 Jul	13:10	Oliva – Kurka	2–0	Hanni – Armellini	22–20	21–17		43–37	Report
16 Jul	14:00	Boiko – Savvin	0–2	Hammarberg – Berger	20–22	14–21		34–43	Report
16 Jul	14:00	Andersen – Hansen	0–2	Kolb – Schalch	19–21	19–21		38–42	Report
16 Jul	14:50	Klungsøyr – Sunde	1–2	Lorenz – Nissen	22–20	14–21	13–15	49–56	Report
16 Jul	14:50	Vercauteren – Van Langendonck	2–0	Groenewold – Sengers	21–19	21–12		42–31	Report

=== Quarterfinals ===
Date	Time		Score		Set 1	Set 2	Set 3	Total	Report
16 Jul	17:20	Czachorowski – Lejawa	0–2	Canet – Rotar	11–21	17–21		28–42	Report
16 Jul	17:20	Ekstrand – Hölting Nilsson	1–2	Oliva – Kurka	17–21	21–15	11–15	49–51	Report
16 Jul	18:10	Hammarberg – Berger	2–1	Kolb – Schalch	21–9	19–21	15–13	55–43	Report
16 Jul	18:10	Lorenz – Nissen	2–0	Vercauteren – Van Langendonck	31–29	21–19		52–48	Report

=== Semifinals ===
Date	Time		Score		Set 1	Set 2	Set 3	Total	Report
17 Jul	13:00	Canet – Rotar	2–1	Oliva – Kurka	13–21	21–19	15–11	49–51	Report
17 Jul	14:00	Hammarberg – Berger	2–1	Lorenz – Nissen	21–15	20–22	15–11	56–48	Report

=== Final 7th place ===
Date	Time		Score		Set 1	Set 2	Set 3	Total	Report
17 Jul	15:00	Czachorowski – Lejawa	0–2	Kolb – Schalch	19–21	19–21		38–42	Report

=== Final 5th place ===
Date	Time		Score		Set 1	Set 2	Set 3	Total	Report
17 Jul	16:00	Ekstrand – Hölting Nilsson	2–0	Vercauteren – Van Langendonck	21–19	21–13		42–32	Report

=== Final 3rd place ===
Date	Time		Score		Set 1	Set 2	Set 3	Total	Report
17 Jul	17:00	Oliva – Kurka	0–2	Lorenz – Nissen	17–21	17–21		34–42	Report

=== Final 1st place ===
Date	Time		Score		Set 1	Set 2	Set 3	Total	Report
17 Jul	18:00	Canet – Rotar	0–2	Hammarberg – Berger	21–16	18–21		39–37	Report

=== Final ranking ===
Rank	Team
1st place, gold medalist(s)	Hammarberg – Berger (AUT)
2nd place, silver medalist(s)	Canet – Rotar (FRA)
3rd place, bronze medalist(s)	Lorenz – Nissen (GER)
4	Oliva – Kurka (CZE)
5	Ekstrand – Hölting Nilsson (SWE)
6	Vercauteren – Van Langendonck (BEL)
7	Kolb – Schalch (SUI)
8	Czachorowski – Lejawa (POL)
9	Fokerots – Bulgačs (LAT)
9	Groenewold – Sengers (NED)
9	Klungsøyr – Sunde (NOR)
9	Kurt – Tür (TUR)
13	Andersen – Hansen (DEN)
13	Kardoulias – Kaliozis (GRE)
13	Hanni – Armellini (ITA)
13	Boiko – Savvin (UKR)
17	Täht – Stog (EST)
17	Dóczi – Udvarhelyi (HUN)
17	Bračko – Vinkovič (SLO)
17	Güllük – Kuru (TUR)
21	Jurković – Devald (CRO)
21	Pulkkinen – Vainio (FIN)
21	Plămădeală – Romanov (MLD)
21	Kaplan – Kesgin (TUR)
25	Bello – Soczewka (ENG)
25	Viera – Tokarev (ESP)
25	Agassi – Laufer (ISR)
25	Strazdas – Palubinskas (LTU)
29	Vartigov – Popov (BUL)
29	Anton – Milcică (ROU)
29	Đogić – Tomić (SRB)
29	Bielka – Vysoký (SVK)

== Women ==
=== Pool A ===
Pos	Team	Pld	W	L	Pts	SW	SL	SR	SPW	SPL	SPR	Qualification
1	Monteiro – Santos (POR)	3	3	0	6	6	0	MAX	126	82	1.537	Round of 16
2	Gouin – Potier (FRA)	3	2	1	5	4	2	2.000	116	92	1.261	Round of 24
3	Pitsigkoni – Gkizetti (GRE)	3	1	2	4	2	4	0.500	95	102	0.931	Round of 24
4	Yılmaz – Aksoy (TUR)	3	0	3	3	0	6	0.000	65	126	0.516	

Source: CEV

Date	Time		Score		Set 1	Set 2	Set 3	Total	Report
14 Jul	09:00	Yılmaz – Aksoy	0–2	Monteiro – Santos	17–21	9–21		26–42	Report
14 Jul	09:00	Gouin – Potier	2–0	Pitsigkoni – Gkizetti	21–19	21–10		42–29	Report
14 Jul	16:00	Yılmaz – Aksoy	0–2	Pitsigkoni – Gkizetti	11–21	7–21		18–42	Report
14 Jul	16:00	Gouin – Potier	0–2	Monteiro – Santos	19–21	13–21		32–42	Report
15 Jul	12:30	Yılmaz – Aksoy	0–2	Gouin – Potier	14–21	7–21		21–42	Report
15 Jul	12:30	Pitsigkoni – Gkizetti	0–2	Monteiro – Santos	14–21	10–21		24–42	Report

=== Pool B ===
Pos	Team	Pld	W	L	Pts	SW	SL	SR	SPW	SPL	SPR	Qualification
1	Piersma – Poiesz (NED)	3	3	0	6	6	1	6.000	141	100	1.410	Round of 16
2	Sinisalo – Muuka (FIN)	3	2	1	5	4	2	2.000	108	89	1.213	Round of 24
3	Marolt – Javornik (SLO)	3	1	2	4	3	4	0.750	121	126	0.960	Round of 24
4	Čikuc – Čikuc (SRB)	3	0	3	3	0	6	0.000	71	126	0.563	

Source: CEV

Date	Time		Score		Set 1	Set 2	Set 3	Total	Report
14 Jul	09:00	Piersma – Poiesz	2–0	Sinisalo – Muuka	21–10	21–14		42–24	Report
14 Jul	09:00	Marolt – Javornik	2–0	Čikuc – Čikuc	21–10	21–17		42–27	Report
14 Jul	16:00	Piersma – Poiesz	2–0	Čikuc – Čikuc	21–11	21–16		42–27	Report
14 Jul	16:00	Marolt – Javornik	0–2	Sinisalo – Muuka	15–21	15–21		30–42	Report
15 Jul	12:30	Piersma – Poiesz	2–1	Marolt – Javornik	21–13	20–22	16–14	57–49	Report
15 Jul	12:30	Čikuc – Čikuc	0–2	Sinisalo – Muuka	10–21	7–21		17–42	Report

=== Pool C ===
Pos	Team	Pld	W	L	Pts	SW	SL	SR	SPW	SPL	SPR	Qualification
1	Binimelis – Fernández da Silva (ESP)	3	3	0	6	6	1	6.000	139	101	1.376	Round of 16
2	Kuivonen – Jürgenson (EST)	3	2	1	5	5	3	1.667	140	130	1.077	Round of 24
3	Berndt – Faroß (GER)	3	1	2	4	3	4	0.750	121	115	1.052	Round of 24
4	Jashari – Avdullahu (KOS)	3	0	3	3	0	6	0.000	72	126	0.571	

Source: CEV

Date	Time		Score		Set 1	Set 2	Set 3	Total	Report
14 Jul	09:45	Binimelis – Fernández da Silva	2–0	Jashari – Avdullahu	21–10	21–15		42–25	Report
14 Jul	09:45	Berndt – Faroß	1–2	Kuivonen – Jürgenson	18–21	21–13	13–15	52–49	Report
14 Jul	16:50	Binimelis – Fernández da Silva	2–1	Kuivonen – Jürgenson	19–21	21–16	15–12	55–49	Report
14 Jul	16:50	Berndt – Faroß	2–0	Jashari – Avdullahu	21–13	21–11		42–24	Report
15 Jul	13:20	Binimelis – Fernández da Silva	2–0	Berndt – Faroß	21–12	21–15		42–27	Report
15 Jul	13:20	Kuivonen – Jürgenson	2–0	Jashari – Avdullahu	21–16	21–7		42–23	Report

=== Pool D ===
Pos	Team	Pld	W	L	Pts	SW	SL	SR	SPW	SPL	SPR	Qualification
1	Konstantinova – Ēbere (LAT)	3	3	0	6	6	0	MAX	126	80	1.575	Round of 16
2	Saxne – Andersson (SWE)	3	2	1	5	4	3	1.333	122	131	0.931	Round of 24
3	Van Deun – Bex (BEL)	3	1	2	4	3	4	0.750	138	120	1.150	Round of 24
4	Páneková – Majerníková (SVK)	3	0	3	3	0	6	0.000	71	126	0.563	

Source: CEV

Date	Time		Score		Set 1	Set 2	Set 3	Total	Report
14 Jul	09:45	Konstantinova – Ēbere	2–0	Van Deun – Bex	21–19	21–19		42–38	Report
14 Jul	09:45	Saxne – Andersson	2–0	Páneková – Majerníková	21–18	21–13		42–31	Report
14 Jul	16:50	Konstantinova – Ēbere	2–0	Páneková – Majerníková	21–9	21–7		42–16	Report
14 Jul	16:50	Saxne – Andersson	2–1	Van Deun – Bex	12–21	27–25	15–12	54–58	Report
15 Jul	13:20	Konstantinova – Ēbere	2–0	Saxne – Andersson	21–14	21–12		42–26	Report
15 Jul	13:20	Páneková – Majerníková	0–2	Van Deun – Bex	9–21	15–21		24–42	Report

=== Pool E ===
Pos	Team	Pld	W	L	Pts	SW	SL	SR	SPW	SPL	SPR	Qualification
1	Khmil – Lazarenko (UKR)	3	3	0	6	6	1	6.000	143	98	1.459	Round of 16
2	Vasvári – Gubik (HUN)	3	2	1	5	5	2	2.500	139	100	1.390	Round of 24
3	Thelle – Windelstad (NOR)	3	1	2	4	2	4	0.500	89	106	0.840	Round of 24
4	Siličytė – Čyvaitė (LTU)	3	0	3	3	0	6	0.000	60	126	0.476	

Source: CEV

Date	Time		Score		Set 1	Set 2	Set 3	Total	Report
14 Jul	10:30	Vasvári – Gubik	2–0	Thelle – Windelstad	21–8	21–16		42–24	Report
14 Jul	10:30	Khmil – Lazarenko	2–0	Siličytė – Čyvaitė	21–10	21–10		42–20	Report
14 Jul	17:40	Khmil – Lazarenko	2–0	Thelle – Windelstad	21–9	21–14		42–23	Report
14 Jul	17:40	Vasvári – Gubik	2–0	Siličytė – Čyvaitė	21–9	21–9		42–18	Report
15 Jul	14:10	Khmil – Lazarenko	2–1	Vasvári – Gubik	22–24	21–18	15–13	58–55	Report
15 Jul	14:10	Thelle – Windelstad	2–0	Siličytė – Čyvaitė	21–6	21–16		42–22	

=== Pool F ===
Pos	Team	Pld	W	L	Pts	SW	SL	SR	SPW	SPL	SPR	Qualification
1	Dainese – Cicola (ITA)	3	2	1	5	4	3	1.333	135	122	1.107	Round of 16
2	Lyø – Hauge (DEN)	3	2	1	5	4	2	2.000	116	114	1.018	Round of 24
3	Mrkić – Šverko (CRO)	3	1	2	4	3	4	0.750	126	126	1.000	Round of 24
4	Kindova – Gavrailova (BUL)	3	1	2	4	2	4	0.500	110	125	0.880	

Source: CEV

Date	Time		Score		Set 1	Set 2	Set 3	Total	Report
14 Jul	10:30	Dainese – Cicola	2–1	Mrkić – Šverko	21–16	16–21	15–8	52–45	Report
14 Jul	10:30	Lyø – Hauge	2–0	Kindova – Gavrailova	21–14	21–19		42–33	Report
14 Jul	17:40	Dainese – Cicola	0–2	Kindova – Gavrailova	18–21	23–25		41–46	Report
14 Jul	17:40	Lyø – Hauge	2–0	Mrkić – Šverko	21–19	22–20		43–39	Report
15 Jul	14:10	Dainese – Cicola	2–0	Lyø – Hauge	21–16	21–15		42–31	Report
15 Jul	14:10	Kindova – Gavrailova	0–2	Mrkić – Šverko	15–21	16–21		31–42	Report

=== Pool G ===
Pos	Team	Pld	W	L	Pts	SW	SL	SR	SPW	SPL	SPR	Qualification
1	Łunio – Ciężkowska (POL)	3	3	0	6	6	1	6.000	138	77	1.792	Round of 16
2	Kernen – Niederhauser (SUI)	3	2	1	5	5	2	2.500	128	95	1.347	Round of 24
3	Brădățan – Miu (ROU)	3	1	2	4	2	4	0.500	85	101	0.842	Round of 24
4	Gillies – Waldie (SCO)	3	0	3	3	0	6	0.000	48	126	0.381	

Source: CEV

Date	Time		Score		Set 1	Set 2	Set 3	Total	Report
14 Jul	11:15	Kernen – Niederhauser	2–0	Gillies – Waldie	21–7	21–8		42–15	Report
14 Jul	11:15	Łunio – Ciężkowska	2–0	Brădățan – Miu	21–9	21–8		42–17	Report
14 Jul	18:30	Kernen – Niederhauser	2–0	Brădățan – Miu	21–14	21–12		42–26	Report
14 Jul	18:30	Łunio – Ciężkowska	2–0	Gillies – Waldie	21–10	21–6		42–16	Report
15 Jul	15:00	Kernen – Niederhauser	1–2	Łunio – Ciężkowska	21–18	10–21	13–15	44–54	Report
15 Jul	15:00	Brădățan – Miu	2–0	Gillies – Waldie	21–10	21–7		42–17	Report

=== Pool H ===
Pos	Team	Pld	W	L	Pts	SW	SL	SR	SPW	SPL	SPR	Qualification
1	Pavelková – Pavelková (CZE)	3	3	0	6	6	1	6.000	134	101	1.327	Round of 16
2	Keefe – Tucker (ENG)	3	2	1	5	4	3	1.333	118	114	1.035	Round of 24
3	Rabitsch – Trailovic (AUT)	3	2	1	5	4	4	1.000	143	126	1.135	Round of 24
4	Lavie – Rolnik (ISR)	3	0	3	3	0	6	0.000	72	126	0.571	

Source: CEV

Date	Time		Score		Set 1	Set 2	Set 3	Total	Report
14 Jul	11:15	Pavelková – Pavelková	2–0	Keefe – Tucker	21–15	21–9		42–24	Report
14 Jul	11:15	Rabitsch – Trailovic	2–0	Lavie – Rolnik	21–14	21–10		42–24	Report
14 Jul	18:30	Pavelková – Pavelková	2–0	Lavie – Rolnik	21–12	21–13		42–25	Report
14 Jul	18:30	Rabitsch – Trailovic	1–2	Keefe – Tucker	16–21	21–16	12–15	49–52	Report
15 Jul	15:00	Pavelková – Pavelková	2–1	Rabitsch – Trailovic	14–21	21–19	15–12	50–52	Report
15 Jul	15:00	Lavie – Rolnik	0–2	Keefe – Tucker	10–21	13–21		23–42	Report

=== Classification 25-29 ===
Date	Time		Score		Set 1	Set 2	Set 3	Total	Report
16 Jul	15:40	Lavie – Rolnik	2–0	Čikuc – Čikuc	21–9	21–17		42–26	Report
16 Jul	15:40	Gillies – Waldie	0–2	Páneková – Majerníková	5–21	8–21		13–42	Report
16 Jul	16:30	Kindova – Gavrailova	2–0	Siličytė – Čyvaitė	21–14	21–12		42–26	Report
16 Jul	16:30	Jashari – Avdullahu	2–0	Yılmaz – Aksoy	21–14	21–17		42–31	Report

=== Classification 17-21 ===
Date	Time		Score		Set 1	Set 2	Set 3	Total	Report
17 Jul	09:00	Marolt – Javornik	2–0	Berndt – Faroß	21–14	21–18		42–32	Report
17 Jul	09:00	Lyø – Hauge	WO	Thelle – Windelstad					Report
17 Jul	09:45	Brădățan – Miu	1–2	Pitsigkoni – Gkizetti	21–16	14–21	10–15	45–52	Report
17 Jul	09:45	Van Deun – Bex	2–0	Mrkić – Šverko	21–14	21–14		42–28	Report

=== Classification 9-13 ===
Date	Time		Score		Set 1	Set 2	Set 3	Total	Report
17 Jul	11:00	Saxne – Andersson	0–2	Rabitsch – Trailovic	15–21	22–24		37–45	Report
17 Jul	12:00	Monteiro – Santos	0–2	Keefe – Tucker	10–21	13–21		23–42	Report
17 Jul	12:00	Gouin – Potier	2–0	Pavelková – Pavelková	21–19	28–26		49–45	Report
17 Jul	12:00	Kernen – Niederhauser	0–2	Sinisalo – Muuka	22–24	17–21		39–45	Report

=== Classification 5-8 ===
Date	Time		Score		Set 1	Set 2	Set 3	Total	Report
17 Jul	13:00	Dainese – Cicola	0–2	Binimelis – Fernández da Silva	16–21	17–21		33–42	Report
17 Jul	13:00	Vasvári – Gubik	1–2	Łunio – Ciężkowska	16–21	21–18	13–15	50–54	Report

=== Final bracket ===
Round of 24
Kuivonen – Jürgenson (EST)	2
Van Deun – Bex (BEL)	1
Gouin – Potier (FRA)	2
Brădățan – Miu (ROU)	0
Kernen – Niederhauser (SUI)	2
Marolt – Javornik (SLO)	1
Keefe – Tucker (ENG)	2
Mrkić – Šverko (CRO)	0
Lyø – Hauge (DEN)	0
Rabitsch – Trailovic (AUT)	2
Vasvári – Gubik (HUN)	2
Pitsigkoni – Gkizetti (GRE)	0
Sinisalo – Muuka (FIN)	2
Thelle – Windelstad (NOR)	0
Saxne – Andersson (SWE)	2
Berndt – Faroß (GER)	1

Round of 16
Monteiro – Santos (POR)	1
Kuivonen – Jürgenson (EST)	2
Dainese – Cicola (ITA)	2
Gouin – Potier (FRA)	0
Khmil – Lazarenko (UKR)	2
Kernen – Niederhauser (SUI)	0
Binimelis – Fernández da Silva (ESP)	2
Keefe – Tucker (ENG)	0
Konstantinova – Ēbere (LAT)	2
Rabitsch – Trailovic (AUT)	1
Pavelková – Pavelková (CZE)	1
Vasvári – Gubik (HUN)	2
Łunio – Ciężkowska (POL)	2
Sinisalo – Muuka (FIN)	1
Piersma – Poiesz (NED)	2
Saxne – Andersson (SWE)	0

Quarterfinals
Kuivonen – Jürgenson (EST)	2
Dainese – Cicola (ITA)	0
Khmil – Lazarenko (UKR)	2
Binimelis – Fernández da Silva (ESP)	0
Konstantinova – Ēbere (LAT)	2
Vasvári – Gubik (HUN)	1
Łunio – Ciężkowska (POL)	0
Piersma – Poiesz (NED)	2

Semifinals
Kuivonen – Jürgenson (EST)	0
Khmil – Lazarenko (UKR)	2
Konstantinova – Ēbere (LAT)	2
Piersma – Poiesz (NED)	1

Final
Khmil – Lazarenko (UKR)	2
Konstantinova – Ēbere (LAT)	0
3rd place
Kuivonen – Jürgenson (EST)	1
Piersma – Poiesz (NED)	2

=== Round of 24 ===
Date	Time		Score		Set 1	Set 2	Set 3	Total	Report
16 Jul	09:00	Kuivonen – Jürgenson	2–1	Van Deun – Bex	25–23	17–21	15–11	57–55	Report
16 Jul	09:00	Gouin – Potier	2–0	Brădățan – Miu	21–19	21–17		42–36	Report
16 Jul	09:50	Kernen – Niederhauser	2–1	Marolt – Javornik	22–20	19–21	15–11	56–52	Report
16 Jul	09:50	Keefe – Tucker	2–0	Mrkić – Šverko	21–18	21–11		42–29	Report
16 Jul	10:40	Lyø – Hauge	0–2	Rabitsch – Trailovic	13–21	19–21		32–42	Report
16 Jul	10:40	Vasvári – Gubik	2–0	Pitsigkoni – Gkizetti	21–6	21–13		42–19	Report
16 Jul	11:30	Sinisalo – Muuka	2–0	Thelle – Windelstad	21–14	21–19		42–33	Report
16 Jul	11:30	Saxne – Andersson	2–1	Berndt – Faroß	21–16	14–21	15–13	50–50	Report

=== Round of 16 ===
Date	Time		Score		Set 1	Set 2	Set 3	Total	Report
16 Jul	12:20	Monteiro – Santos	1–2	Kuivonen – Jürgenson	15–21	21–18	11–15	47–54	Report
16 Jul	12:20	Dainese – Cicola	2–0	Gouin – Potier	21–13	21–7		42–20	Report
16 Jul	13:10	Khmil – Lazarenko	2–0	Kernen – Niederhauser	21–13	21–17		42–30	Report
16 Jul	13:10	Binimelis – Fernández da Silva	2–0	Keefe – Tucker	21–16	21–10		42–26	Report
16 Jul	14:00	Konstantinova – Ēbere	2–1	Rabitsch – Trailovic	21–13	17–21	15–7	53–41	Report
16 Jul	14:00	Pavelková – Pavelková	1–2	Vasvári – Gubik	19–21	21–15	13–15	53–51	Report
16 Jul	14:50	Łunio – Ciężkowska	2–1	Sinisalo – Muuka	21–14	7–21	15–12	43–47	Report
16 Jul	14:50	Piersma – Poiesz	2–0	Saxne – Andersson	21–12	21–18		42–30	Report

=== Quarterfinals ===
Date	Time		Score		Set 1	Set 2	Set 3	Total	Report
16 Jul	17:20	Kuivonen – Jürgenson	2–0	Dainese – Cicola	21–12	21–17		42–29	Report
16 Jul	17:20	Khmil – Lazarenko	2–0	Binimelis – Fernández da Silva	21–19	21–19		42–38	Report
16 Jul	18:10	Konstantinova – Ēbere	2–1	Vasvári – Gubik	21–15	14–21	15–12	50–48	Report
16 Jul	18:10	Łunio – Ciężkowska	0–2	Piersma – Poiesz	13–21	10–21		23–42	Report

=== Semifinals ===
Date	Time		Score		Set 1	Set 2	Set 3	Total	Report
17 Jul	11:00	Kuivonen – Jürgenson	0–2	Khmil – Lazarenko	11–21	13–21		24–42	Report
17 Jul	12:00	Konstantinova – Ēbere	2–1	Piersma – Poiesz	19–21	21–14	18–16	58–51	Report

=== Final 7th place ===
Date	Time		Score		Set 1	Set 2	Set 3	Total	Report
17 Jul	16:00	Dainese – Cicola	0–2	Vasvári – Gubik	18–21	15–21		33–42	Report

=== Final 5th place ===
Date	Time		Score		Set 1	Set 2	Set 3	Total	Report
17 Jul	16:00	Binimelis – Fernández da Silva	1–2	Łunio – Ciężkowska	21–18	19–21	16–18	56–57	Report

=== Final 3rd place ===
Date	Time		Score		Set 1	Set 2	Set 3	Total	Report
17 Jul	15:00	Kuivonen – Jürgenson	1–2	Piersma – Poiesz	12–21	21–19	13–15	46–55	Report

=== Final 1st place ===
Date	Time		Score		Set 1	Set 2	Set 3	Total	Report
17 Jul	16:00	Khmil – Lazarenko	2–0	Konstantinova – Ēbere	21–13	21–17		42–30	Report

=== Final ranking ===
Rank	Team
1st place, gold medalist(s)	Khmil – Lazarenko (UKR)
2nd place, silver medalist(s)	Konstantinova – Ēbere (LAT)
3rd place, bronze medalist(s)	Piersma – Poiesz (NED)
4	Kuivonen – Jürgenson (EST)
5	Łunio – Ciężkowska (POL)
6	Binimelis – Fernández da Silva (ESP)
7	Vasvári – Gubik (HUN)
8	Dainese – Cicola (ITA)
9	Rabitsch – Trailovic (AUT)
9	Keefe – Tucker (ENG)
9	Sinisalo – Muuka (FIN)
9	Gouin – Potier (FRA)
13	Pavelková – Pavelková (CZE)
13	Monteiro – Santos (POR)
13	Kernen – Niederhauser (SUI)
13	Saxne – Andersson (SWE)
17	Van Deun – Bex (BEL)
17	Lyø – Hauge (DEN)
17	Pitsigkoni – Gkizetti (GRE)
17	Marolt – Javornik (SLO)
21	Mrkić – Šverko (CRO)
21	Berndt – Faroß (GER)
21	Thelle – Windelstad (NOR)
21	Brădățan – Miu (ROU)
25	Kindova – Gavrailova (BUL)
25	Lavie – Rolnik (ISR)
25	Jashari – Avdullahu (KOS)
25	Páneková – Majerníková (SVK)
29	Siličytė – Čyvaitė (LTU)
29	Gillies – Waldie (SCO)
29	Čikuc – Čikuc (SRB)
29	Yılmaz – Aksoy (TUR)
