= Tetiana Lazarenko =

Ukrainian beach volleyball player

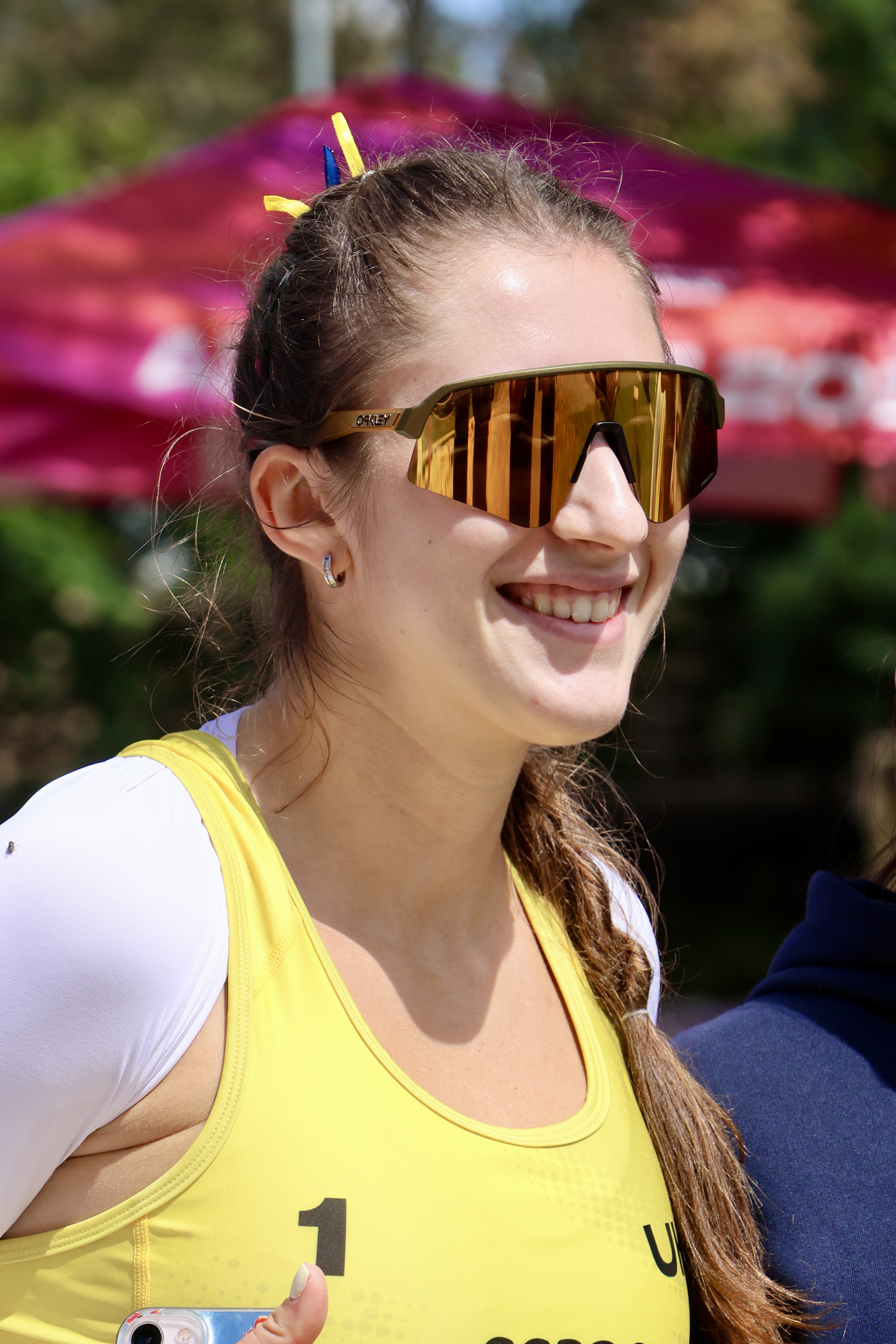
- Lazarenko at the 2025 World Championships

Personal information
- Nationality: Ukrainian
- Born: 18 August 2003 (age 23) Zaporizhzhia, Ukraine
- Height: 1.80 m (5 ft 11 in)

Sport
- Sport: Beach volleyball
Medal record
Women's beach volleyball
Representing Ukraine
European Championships
Gold medal – first place	2025 Düsseldorf	Beach
Volleyball World Beach Pro Tour
Gold medal – first place	2022	Warsaw Future
Gold medal – first place	2023	Spiez Future
Gold medal – first place	2023	Warsaw Future II
Gold medal – first place	2024	Chennai Challenge
Silver medal – second place	2022	Białystok Future
Silver medal – second place	2023	Madrid Future
Silver medal – second place	2024	Rakvere Future
Bronze medal – third place	2024	Ios Island Future
Bronze medal – third place	2024	Baden Future
FIVB Beach Volleyball World Tour
Gold medal – first place	2021	Sofia Beach Open 2
Bronze medal – third place	2021	World Tour Star 1 Budapest
Bronze medal – third place	2021	Koropiv Hutir Cup
Bronze medal – third place	2021	World Tour 1 Star Madrid
World U19 Championships
Bronze medal – third place	2021 Phuket	Beach
World U21 Championships
Gold medal – first place	2021 Phuket	Beach
European U22 Championships
Bronze medal – third place	2021 Baden	Beach
Bronze medal – third place	2022 Vlissingen	Beach
European U20 Championships
Gold medal – first place	2022 İzmir	Beach
European U18 Championships
Gold medal – first place	2020 İzmir	Beach

Tetiana Lazarenko (born 18 August 2003) is a Ukrainian beach volleyball player.

== Career ==
Since 2019, her partner was Anhelina Khmil. They debuted competing in international competitions at the 2019 U20 Beach Volleyball European Championships, where they didn't reach quarterfinals.

Later, they represented Ukraine at the 2020 European Beach Volleyball U18 Championships, held in İzmir, where they won gold medals.

In 2021, they debuted competing at the 2021 FIVB Beach Volleyball U21 World Championships, held in Phuket reaching a gold medal. Khmil/Lazarenko represented Ukraine at the 2021 FIVB Beach Volleyball U19 World Championships, where they won a bronze medal, and also at the 2021 European U22 Beach Volleyball Championships, held in Baden, receiving bronze medals too.

Lazarenko and Khmil competed at the FIVB Beach Volleyball World Tour in 2021, where they won a gold medal in Sofia Beach Open 2 and three bronze medals.

In 2022, Khmil/Lazarenko competed at the Volleyball World Beach Pro Tour, winning a gold medal in Warsaw and a silver medal in Białystok. In that year, they received gold medals at the 2022 European U20 Beach Volleyball Championships and bronze medals at the 2022 European U22 Beach Volleyball Championships.

Because of Khmil's studying at the Texas Christian University in the United States, Tetiana had to changed her partner. Yevhenia Baieva became her partner and they competed at the 2022 European Beach Volleyball Championships without winning a Pool F.

In January 2023, Lazarenko moved to the sport club "Prometheus" in Kamianske, and Diana Lunina became her new partner.

Lazarenko compete with Lunina and later Maryna Hladun at the 2023 Volleyball World Beach Pro Tour, winning two gold and one silver medals.

Lazarenko and Hladun reached the round of 16 at the 2024 European Beach Volleyball Championships.

A year later, the pair won gold at the 2025 European Beach Volleyball Championships.
