= Anhelina Khmil =

Ukrainian beach volleyball player

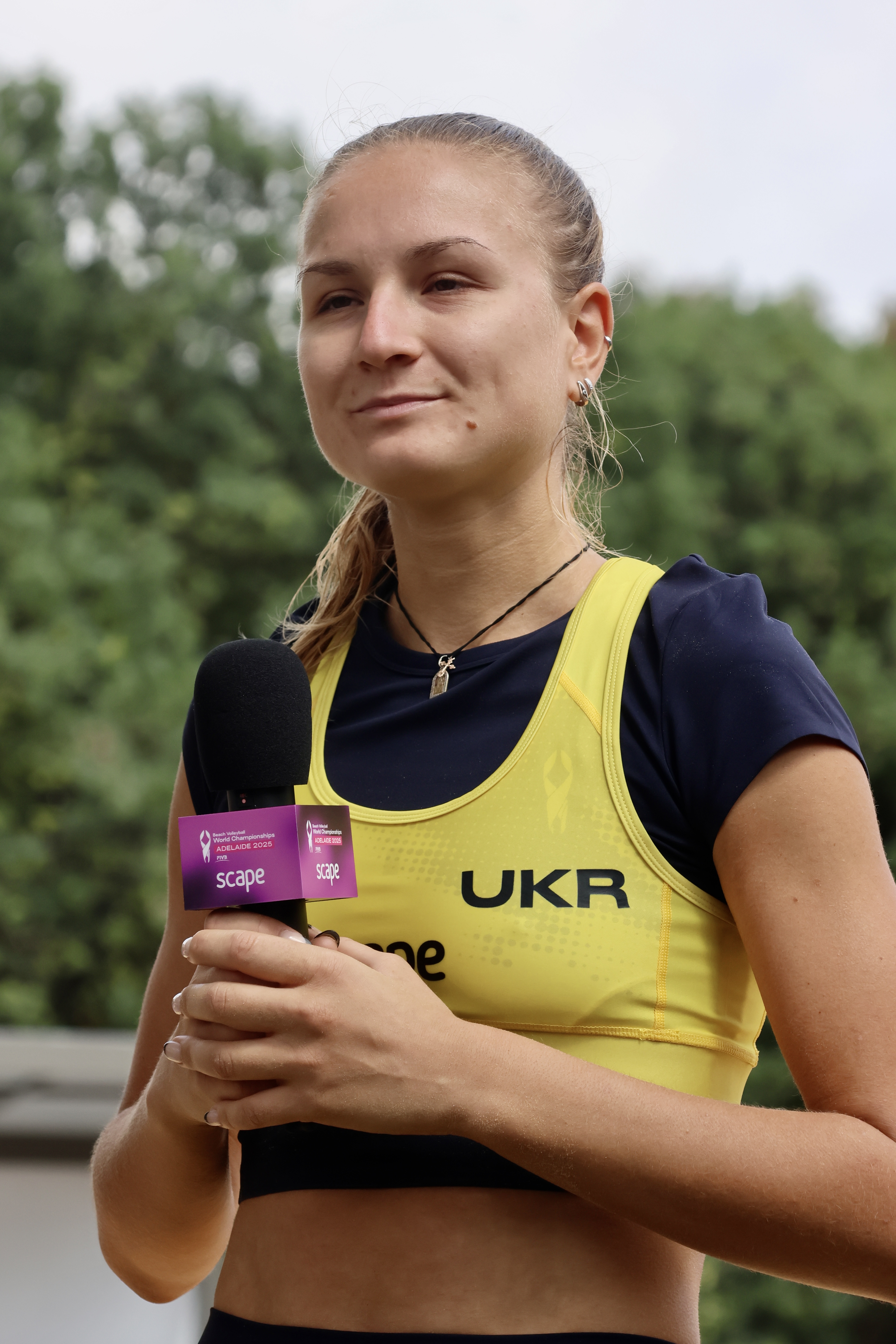
- Khmil at the 2025 World Championships

Personal information
- Nationality: Ukrainian
- Born: 27 June 2003 (age 23) Kremenchuk, Ukraine
- Height: 1.87 m (6 ft 2 in)

Sport
- Sport: Beach volleyball
Medal record
Women's beach volleyball
Representing Ukraine
Volleyball World Beach Pro Tour
Gold medal – first place	2022	Warsaw Future
Gold medal – first place	2024	Madrid Future
Silver medal – second place	2022	Białystok Future
Silver medal – second place	2024	Madrid Future
Silver medal – second place	2025	Sveti Vlas Future
Silver medal – second place	2026	Shangluo Challenge
Bronze medal – third place	2025	Baden Challenge
FIVB Beach Volleyball World Tour
Gold medal – first place	2021	Sofia Beach Open 2
Bronze medal – third place	2021	World Tour Star 1 Budapest
Bronze medal – third place	2021	Koropiv Hutir Cup
Bronze medal – third place	2021	World Tour 1 Star Madrid
World U19 Championships
Bronze medal – third place	2021 Phuket	Beach
World U21 Championships
Gold medal – first place	2021 Phuket	Beach
European U22 Championships
Bronze medal – third place	2021 Baden	Beach
Bronze medal – third place	2022 Vlissingen	Beach
European U20 Championships
Gold medal – first place	2022 İzmir	Beach
European U18 Championships
Gold medal – first place	2020 İzmir	Beach

Anhelina Khmil (born 27 June 2003) is a Ukrainian beach volleyball player.

== Career ==
Khmil with her partner Tetiana Lazarenko debuted career at the 2019 U20 Beach Volleyball European Championship, where they didn't reach quarterfinals.

In the following year, they competed at the 2020 European Beach Volleyball U18 Championships, receiving gold medals.

In 2021, they competed at the 2021 FIVB Beach Volleyball U21 World Championships, held in Phuket reaching a gold medal. Khmil/Lazarenko also represented Ukraine at the 2021 FIVB Beach Volleyball U19 World Championships, where they won a bronze medal. In that year they received a bronze medal at the 2021 European U22 Beach Volleyball Championships, held in Baden.

Anhelina and Lazarenko competed at the FIVB Beach Volleyball World Tour in 2021, where they won a gold medal in Sofia Beach Open 2 and three bronze medals.

In 2022, Khmil/Lazarenko competed at the Volleyball World Beach Pro Tour, winning a gold medal in Warsaw and a silver medal in Białystok. In that year, they received gold medals at the 2022 European U20 Beach Volleyball Championships and bronze medals at the 2022 European U22 Beach Volleyball Championships.

Khmil began to study at the United States, so the couple Khmil/Lazarenko finished its existence. She started studying at the Texas Christian University. Representing her university, she became a champion of the 2023 AVCA Collegiate Beach National Pairs Championships with Hailey Hamlett.

But she continued to represent Ukraine at the international competitions with Yeva Serdiuk from Chornomorsk in 2023. They received bronze medals at the 2023 Ukrainian National Beach Volleyball U22 Championships. Khmil/Serdiuk competed at the 2023 European U22 Beach Volleyball Championships without reaching semi-finals.
