= Nadezda Makroguzova =

Russian beach volleyball player (born 1997)

Personal information
- Full name: Nadezda Alekseevna Makroguzova
- Nationality: (Russia) Russian
- Born: 2 April 1997 (age 29); Tbilisskay, Russia
- Height: 1.83 m (6 ft 0 in)
- Weight: 63 kg (139 lb)

Beach volleyball information

Current teammate
Years	Teammate
2016–present	Svetlana Kholomina

Previous teammates
Years	Teammate
2012–2013; 2013–2014; 2013–2014; 2015; 2015; 2015–2016; 2016; 2017; 2020	Anna Gorbunova; Daria Rudykh; Anna Gorbunova; Ekaterina Makroguzova; Ksenia Dabizha; Olga Motrich; Anastasia Barsuk; Ekaterina Birlova; Daria Rudykh

Best results
Years	Location	Result
2021; 2020; 2019	Cancun Hub - 2nd event CEV European Championship; Espinho Open	2nd 3rd 1st
Medal record
Women's beach volleyball
Representing Russia
FIVB Beach Volleyball World Tour
Gold medal – first place	2019	Espinho Open
Silver medal – second place	2021	Cancun Hub
European Championship
Bronze medal – third place	2020 Jurmala	Beach
U21 World Championships
Silver medal – second place	2016 Lucerne	Beach
Silver medal – second place	2017 Nanjing	Beach
U19 World Championships
Silver medal – second place	2013 Porto	Beach

Nadezda Alekseevna Makroguzova (Russian: Надежда Алексеевна Макрогузова; born 2 April 1997) is a Russian beach volleyball player. As of 2016, she plays with Svetlana Kholomina. They qualified for the 2020 Summer Olympics in Tokyo.

== Professional career ==
Nadezda and her partner Svetlana Kholomina are the two-time silver medalists in the U21 World championship (2016, 2017). In 2019 they won the 4-star tournament of the FIVB Beach Volleyball World Tour in Portugal. In 2021 the partners took the silver medals in FIVB Beach Volleyball World Tour's 4-star tournament in Cancún, Mexico.
