= Jyrki Nurminen =

Finnish beach volleyball player

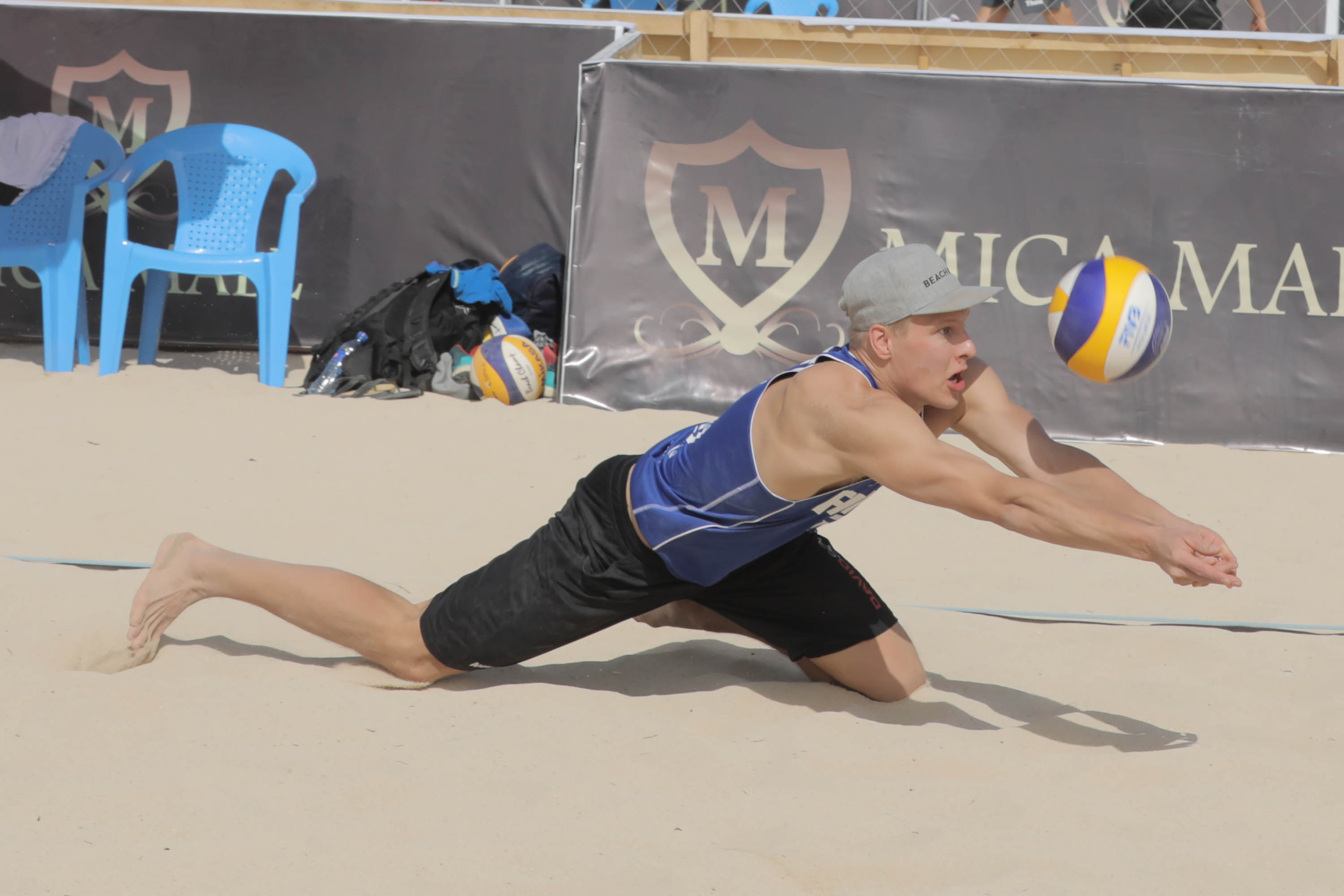

Personal information
- Nationality: Finnish
- Born: November 2, 1990 (age 35); Ristijärvi, Finland
- Hometown: Vantaa, Finland
- Height: 188 cm (6 ft 2 in)
- Weight: 85 kg (187 lb)
- Spike: 330 cm (130 in)
- Block: 315 cm (124 in)

Beach volleyball information

Current teammate
Years	Teammate
2018 - Present	Santeri Siren

Previous teammates
Years	Teammate
2010 - 2017	Pekka Piippo

Jyrki Nurminen (born 2 November 1990 in Ristijärvi, Finland) is a most successful Finnish beach volleyball player, playing as a defender. He won the Finnish beach volleyball championship 10 times, in 2012, 2016, 2017, 2018, 2019, 2020, 2021, 2022, 2023 and 2024. During his career, Nurminen also played volleyball in Finnish championship league, but since 2016, he focuses entirely on the beach volleyball career. His partner in beach volleyball is currently Santeri Sirén. Nurminen has received the first level coaching volleyball license and works also as a coach of both, beach volleyball and volleyball. He is a founder of a company arranging beach volleyball events and camps. Company is also responsible for organizing Finnish open level tour in Finland - JNBT tour.

== Career ==
Nurminen started to play volleyball when he was 6 years old and eventually, after the junior age in 2010, he got a placement as an outside hitter in Oulu volleyball team Oulun Etta which is in the Finnish championship league. In the same year, he played Finnish beach volleyball championship tour with Pekka Piippo. In 2012, he decided to focus on beach volleyball and moved to Helsinki due to opportunities to train beach volley in an indoor beach volleyball hall. However, during 2012 – 2013, he was still playing volleyball league in Korson Veto team.

Nurminen won first gold medal in the Finnish championship tour in 2012 with his partner Pekka Piippo. After the success, they decided to concentrate on outside tours, were chosen to the Finnish beach volley national team and pursued the career towards being more professional in beach volleyball.

In 2017, Nurminen and Piippo competed in the European Championship in beach volley in Jurmala, Latvia. They finished the tournament in 25th position.

In 2018, Nurminen paired up with Santeri Sirén as a new partner. Their goal is to direct their effort to the world tour. They have received a 4-year sponsor contract from TMR Invest Oy and in addition to it a financial support from Beach volley Finland. They raised their world ranking position from 126th to 55th place.
