= Svetlana Kholomina =

Russian beach volleyball player (born 1997)

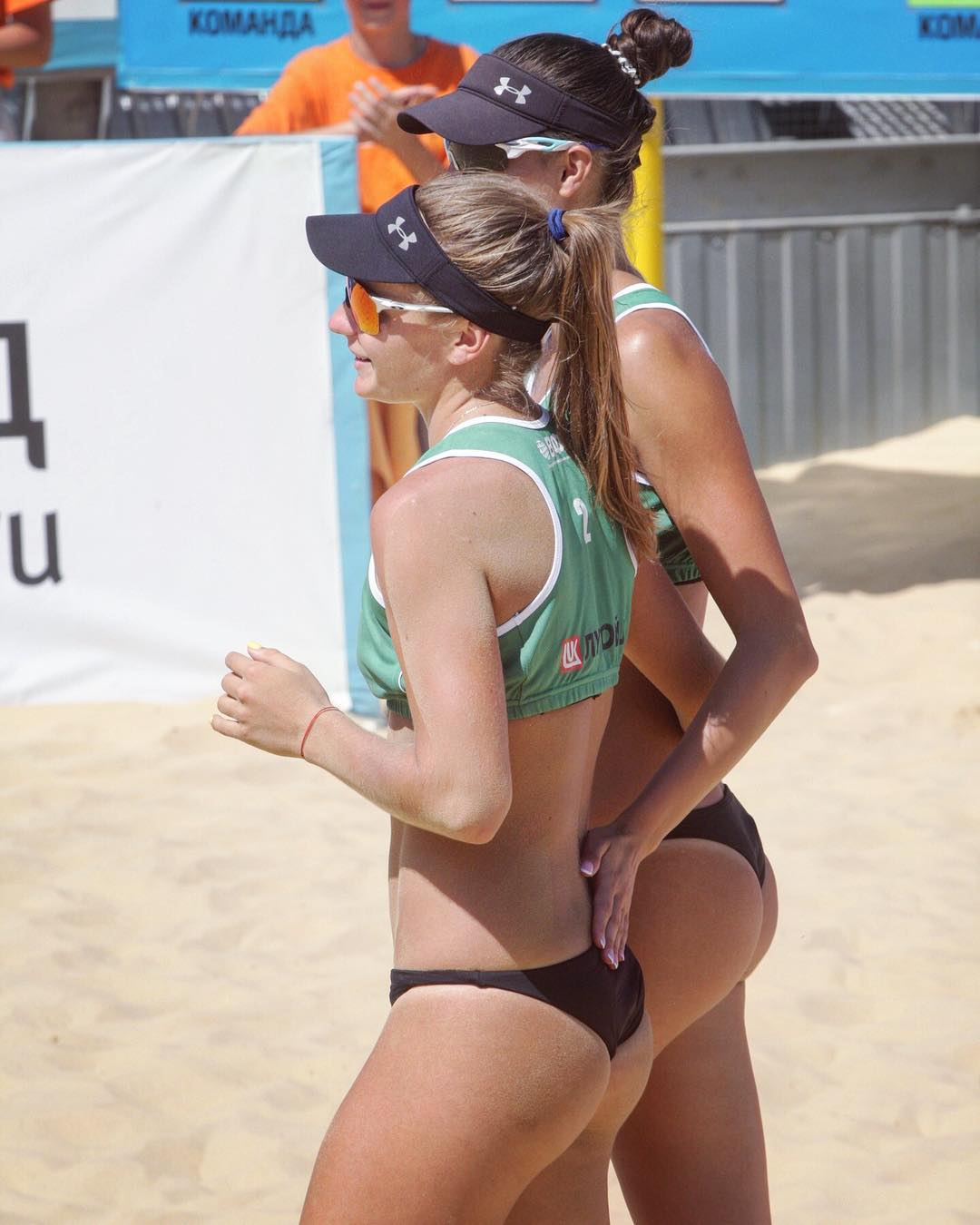

Personal information
- Full name: Svetlana Yuryevna Kholomina
- Nationality: (Russia) Russian
- Born: 9 November 1997 (age 28); Obninsk, Russia
- Height: 1.74 m (5 ft 9 in)
- Weight: 62 kg (137 lb)

Beach volleyball information

Current teammate
Years	Teammate
2016–present	Nadezda Makroguzova

Previous teammates
Years	Teammate
2014; 2014–2015; 2015; 2015; 2016; 2017; 2020; 2020	Anna Sarycheva; Kseniia Timofeeva; Ekaterina Makroguzova; Daria Mastikova; Olga Kozhadey; Olga Motrich; Elizaveta Gubina; Maria Voronina

Best results
Years	Location	Result
2021; 2020; 2019	Cancun Open - 2nd event CEV European Championship; Espinho Open	2nd 3rd 1st
Medal record
Women's beach volleyball
Representing Russia
FIVB Beach Volleyball World Tour
Gold medal – first place	2019	Espinho Open
Silver medal – second place	2021	Cancun Hub
European Championship
Bronze medal – third place	2020 Jurmala	Beach
U21 World Championships
Silver medal – second place	2016 Lucerne	Beach
Silver medal – second place	2017 Nanjing	Beach

Svetlana Yuryevna Kholomina (Russian: Светлана Юрьевна Холомина; born 9 November 1997) is a Russian beach volleyball player. As of 2016, she plays with Nadezda Makroguzova. They qualified for 2020 Summer Olympics in Tokyo.

== Professional career ==
Svetlana and her partner Nadezda Makroguzova are the two-time silver medalist in the U21 World championship (2016, 2017). In 2019 they won the 4-star tournament of the FIVB Beach Volleyball World Tour in Portugal. In 2021 the partners took the silver medals in FIVB Beach Volleyball World Tour's 4-star tournament in Cancún, Mexico.
