= 2010–2012 CEV Beach Volleyball Continental Cup =

Teams will be split into groups of four, where an elimination bracket will determine the 3 teams to advance to the next stage from the sub-zones. The winner of the 2010–12 Continental Beach Volleyball Cup will advance to the Olympics.

== Men ==
=== Sub-zonal phase ===
==== Pool A ====
Pool A was contested in Mellieha, Malta.

Semi-finals
4 September
Switzerland	3
Malta	0
4 September
Denmark	3
Great Britain	0

Final
5 September
Switzerland	3
Denmark	0
Third place
5 September
Malta	0
Great Britain	3

- Malta is eliminated.

==== Pool B ====
Pool B was contested in Zreče, Slovenia.

Semi-finals
4 September
Germany	3
Slovenia	0
4 September
Norway	3
Portugal	0

Final
5 September
Germany	2
Norway	3
Third place
5 September
Slovenia	1
Portugal	3

- Slovenia is eliminated.

==== Pool C ====
Pool C was contested in Las Palmas, Spain.

Semi-finals
16 October
Spain	3
Iceland	0
16 October
Italy	3
Sweden	0

Final
17 October
Spain	3
Italy	0
Third place
17 October
Iceland	0
Sweden	3

- Iceland is eliminated.

==== Pool D ====
Pool D was contested in Montpellier, France.

Semi-finals
25 September
Netherlands	3
Israel	0
25 September
France	3
Serbia	1

Final
26 September
Netherlands	3
France	2
Third place
26 September
Israel	0
Serbia	4

- Israel is eliminated.

==== Pool E ====
Pool E was contested in Illichivsk, Ukraine.

Semi-finals
25 September
Poland	3
Croatia	0
25 September
Ukraine	2
Czech Republic	3

Final
26 September
Poland	1
Czech Republic	0
Third place
26 September
Croatia	0
Ukraine	3

- Croatia is eliminated.

==== Pool F ====
Pool F was contested in Yantarniy, Russia.

Semi-finals
25 September
Russia	4
Lithuania	0
25 September
Bulgaria	3
Latvia	2

Final
26 September
Russia	4
Bulgaria	0
Third place
26 September
Lithuania	2
Latvia	3

- Lithuania is eliminated.

==== Pool G ====
Pool G was contested in Rhodes, Greece.

Semi-finals
25 September
Estonia	3
Romania	0
25 September
Greece	3
Cyprus	1

Final
26 September
Estonia	3
Greece	0
Third place
26 September
Romania	3
Cyprus	2

- Cyprus is eliminated.

==== Pool H ====
Pool H was contested in Alanya, Turkey.

Semi-finals
25 September
Austria	BYE
-	-
25 September
Turkey	3
Slovakia	1

Final
26 September
Austria	1
Turkey	3
Third place
26 September
-	-
Slovakia	BYE

- No team is eliminated, because there were only 3 teams. Finland withdrew which left a field of only 3 teams.

=== Zonal phase ===
The 24 qualified teams advanced to the Zonal phase and will be split into four groups of six teams. The top team in each group advance to the finals and the teams placing second through fifth advance to the semifinals.

==== Pool A ====
Pool A will be contested in Kazan, Russia.

Quarterfinals
June 2
Russia
BYE
June 2
Bulgaria	1
Great Britain	3
June 2
Switzerland
BYE
June 2
France	1
Latvia	3

Semifinals
June 3
Russia	3
Great Britain	1
June 3
Switzerland	1
Latvia	3

Final
June 4
Russia	2
Latvia	3
Third place
June 4
Great Britain	1
Switzerland	3

5th place match
June 4
Bulgaria	0
France	4

- Bulgaria is eliminated, Latvia advances to the finals.

==== Pool B ====
Pool B will be contested in Tenerife, Spain.

Quarterfinals
Norway
BYE
September 30
Czech Republic	3
Slovakia	0
Spain
BYE
September 30
Austria	3
Serbia	0

Semifinals
October 1
Norway	3
Czech Republic	0
October 1
Spain	1
Austria	3

Final
October 2
Norway	1
Austria	3
Third place
October 2
Spain	3
Czech Republic	0

5th place match
October 1
Serbia	3
Slovakia	1

- Slovakia is eliminated, Austria advances to the finals.

==== Pool C ====
Pool C will be contested in Copenhagen, Denmark.

Quarterfinals
Netherlands
BYE
September 9
Italy	3
Portugal	1
Turkey
BYE
September 9
Denmark	3
Romania	1

Semifinals
September 10
Netherlands	3
Italy	1
September 10
Turkey	2
Denmark	3

Final
September 11
Netherlands	3
Denmark	1
Third place
September 11
Turkey	2
Italy	3

5th place match
September 11
Portugal	3
Romania	2

- Romania is eliminated, Netherlands advances to the finals.

==== Pool D ====
Pool D will be contested in Illichivsk, Ukraine.

Quarterfinals
Estonia
BYE
June 23
Greece	2
Ukraine	3
Poland
BYE
June 23
Germany	3
Sweden	1

Semifinals
June 24
Estonia	3
Ukraine	1
June 24
Poland	1
Germany	3

Final
June 25
Estonia	1
Germany	3
Third place
June 25
Poland	3
Ukraine	2

5th place match
June 25
Greece	3
Sweden	1

- No one is eliminated as Sweden is the highest ranked 6th place team, Germany advances to the finals.

=== Continental Cup semifinal ===
Semifinals will be contested in France and Switzerland. The 16 qualified teams that advanced to the continental cup semifinal and will be split into two groups of eight teams. The top team in each group advances to the finals.

The following teams will compete.

- Czech Republic
- Denmark
- Estonia
- France
- Great Britain
- Greece
- Italy
- Norway
- Poland
- Portugal
- Russia
- Serbia
- Spain
- Sweden
- Switzerland
- Ukraine

=== Continental Cup final ===
Semifinals will be contested in Turkey. The 8 qualified teams that advanced to the continental cup final as hosts, the four winners in the zonal phase, the two winners of the continental semifinal and the highest ranked non-qualified team. The winner will qualify to the 2012 Summer Olympics and the second and third place teams will qualify to the final qualification tournament.

The following teams will compete.

- Austria
- Germany
- Latvia
- Netherlands
- Turkey
- Russia
- Denmark
- Poland

== Women ==
=== Sub-zonal phase ===
Teams will be split into groups of four, where an elimination bracket will determine the 3 teams to advance to the zonal phase.

==== Pool A ====
Pool A will be contested in Mellieha, Malta.

Semifinals
September 4
Switzerland	3
Malta	0
September 4
Great Britain	3
Denmark	0

Final
September 5
Switzerland	1
Great Britain	3
Third place
September 5
Denmark	3
Malta	1

- Malta is eliminated.

==== Pool B ====
Pool B will be contested in Zrece, Slovenia.

Semifinals
September 4
Germany	3
Portugal	0
September 4
Slovenia	3
Norway	0

Final
September 5
Germany	3
Slovenia	0
Third place
September 5
Norway	3
Portugal	1

- Portugal is eliminated.

==== Pool C ====
Pool C will be contested in Las Palmas, Spain.

Semifinals
October 16
Spain	3
Iceland	0
October 16
Italy	3
Sweden	0

Final
October 17
Spain	1
Italy	3
Third place
October 17
Sweden	3
Iceland	0

- Iceland is eliminated.

==== Pool D ====
Pool D will be contested in Montpellier, France.

Semifinals
September 25
Netherlands	4
Serbia	0
September 25
France	4
Liechtenstein	0

Final
September 26
Netherlands	4
France	0
Third place
September 26
Liechtenstein	0
Serbia	4

- Liechtenstein is eliminated.

==== Pool E ====
Pool E will be contested in Illichivsk, Ukraine.

Semifinals
September 4
Poland	3
Croatia	0
September 4
Czech Republic	3
Ukraine	1

Final
September 5
Poland	3
Czech Republic	2
Third place
September 5
Ukraine	3
Croatia	0

- Croatia is eliminated.

==== Pool F ====
Pool F will be contested in Yantarniy, Russia.

Semifinals
July 24
Russia	3
Lithuania	0
July 24
Latvia	3
Bulgaria	2

Final
July 25
Russia	3
Latvia	1
Third place
July 25
Lithuania	0
Bulgaria	3

- Lithuania is eliminated.

==== Pool G ====
Pool G will be contested in Rhodes, Greece.

Semifinals
September 16
Greece	3
Romania	0
September 16
Estonia	3
Cyprus	1

Final
September 18
Greece	3
Estonia	1
Third place
September 17
Cyprus	3
Romania	2

- Romania is eliminated.

==== Pool H ====
Pool H will be contested in Alanya, Turkey.

Semifinals
September 24/25
Austria	3
Turkey	0
September 24/25
Finland	3
Slovakia	1

Final
September 26
Austria	3
Finland	1
Third place
September 26
Slovakia	3
Turkey	1

- Turkey is eliminated.

=== Zonal phase ===
The 24 qualified teams advanced to the Zonal phase and will be split into four groups of six teams. The top team in each group advance to the finals and the teams placing second through fifth advance to the semifinals.

==== Pool A ====
Pool A will be contested in Kazan, Russia.

Quarterfinals
Russia
BYE
Latvia
BYE
Netherlands
BYE
June 2
France	3
Sweden	1

Semifinals
June 3
Russia	4
Latvia	0
June 3
Netherlands	3
France	1

Final
June 4
Russia	1
Netherlands	3
Third place
June 4
Latvia	2
France	3

5th place match
Sweden
BYE

- Cyprus withdrew, Netherlands advances to the finals.

==== Pool B ====
Pool B will be contested in Tenerife, Spain.

Quarterfinals
Germany
BYE
September 30
Czech Republic	1
Slovakia	3
Italy
BYE
September 30
Spain	3
Norway	0

Semifinals
October 1
Germany	3
Slovakia	0
October 1
Italy	3
Spain	1

Final
October 2
Germany	3
Italy	2
Third place
October 2
Spain	3
Slovakia	1

5th place match
October 1
Norway	1
Czech Republic	3

- No one is eliminated as Norway is the highest ranked 6th place team, Germany advances to the finals.

==== Pool C ====
Pool C will be contested in Copenhagen, Denmark.

Quarterfinals
Austria
BYE
September 9
Estonia	4
Denmark	0
Greece
BYE
September 9
Slovenia	3
Bulgaria	1

Semifinals
September 10
Austria	3
Estonia	1
September 10
Greece	4
Slovenia	0

Final
September 11
Austria	3
Greece	1
Third place
September 11
Slovenia	3
Estonia	1

5th place match
September 10
Denmark	1
Bulgaria	3

- Denmark is eliminated, Austria advances to the finals.

==== Pool D ====
Pool D will be contested in Illichivsk, Ukraine.

Quarterfinals
Great Britain
BYE
June 23
Finland	1
Ukraine	3
Poland
BYE
June 23
Switzerland	3
Serbia	1

Semifinals
June 24
Great Britain	3
Ukraine	1
June 24
Poland	1
Switzerland	3

Final
June 25
Great Britain	1
Switzerland	3
Third place
June 25
Poland	3
Ukraine	1

5th place match
June 24
Finland	3
Serbia	1

- Serbia is eliminated, Switzerland advances to the finals.

=== Continental Cup semifinal ===
Semifinals will be contested in France and Switzerland. The 16 qualified teams that advanced to the continental cup semifinal and will be split into two groups of eight teams. The top team in each group advances to the finals.

The following teams will compete.

- Bulgaria
- Czech Republic
- Estonia
- Finland
- France
- Great Britain
- Greece
- Italy
- Latvia
- Norway
- Poland
- Slovakia
- Slovenia
- Spain
- Sweden
- Ukraine

=== Continental Cup final ===
Finals will be contested in Russia. The 8 qualified teams that advanced to the continental cup final as hosts, the four winners in the zonal phase, the two winners of the continental semifinal and the highest ranked non-qualified team. The winner will qualify to the 2012 Summer Olympics and the second and third place teams will qualify to the final qualification tournament.

The following teams will compete.

- Austria
- Germany
- Netherlands
- Russia
- Switzerland
- Greece
- Spain
- TBA

== See also ==
Volleyball at the 2012 Summer Olympics
