= Olga Gavrilova =

Soviet javelin thrower (1957–2022)

Medal record

Women's athletics

Representing the Soviet Union

IAAF World Cup
Gold medal – first place	1985 Canberra	Javelin throw

Olga Nikolaevna Gavrilova (Russian: Ольга Николаевна Гаврилова; 8 February 1957 – Svobodny, Amur Oblast, 3 January 2022) was a Russian track and field athlete who competed in the javelin throw.

She ranked in the global top twenty-five for the discipline in 1984, recording a personal best mark of 63.52 m (208 ft 4 3/4 in). Her sole international medal came at the 1985 IAAF World Cup, where she was a surprise winner with a throw of 66.80 m (219 ft 1 3/4 in), beating East German champion (and future Olympic champion) Petra Felke and World Championships medallist Fatima Whitbread. Alongside Natalya Lisovskaya, she was only one of two Soviet female winners at the competition and helped her nation to second place in the team rankings. Gavrilova only placed ninth at the Soviet Athletics Championships that year and brought an end to Felke's 26-meeting undefeated streak.

Gavrilova died in Svobodny on 3 January 2022, at the age of 64.
