= 2017 Beach Volleyball World Championships – Men's tournament =

Tournament details
- Host country: Austria
- City: Vienna
- Dates: 28 June – 6 July
- Teams: 48 (from 5 confederations)

Final positions
- Champions: Brazil; Evandro Oliveira; André Stein (1st title)
- Runners-up: Austria; Clemens Doppler; Alexander Horst
- Third place: Russia; Viacheslav Krasilnikov; Nikita Lyamin
- Fourth place: Netherlands; Christiaan Varenhorst; Maarten van Garderen

The men's tournament was held from 28 July to 6 August 2017.

Evandro Oliveira and André Stein won the title, defeating hosts Clemens Doppler and Alexander Horst in the final, 23–21, 22–20. Stein became the youngest player to win a gold medal at the World Championships at the age of 22.

== Preliminary round ==
Qualified for the Round of 32 as pool winners or runners-up
Qualified for the Round of 32 as one of the best four third-placed teams
Qualified for the Lucky Losers Playoffs
Eliminated

=== Pool A ===
Pos	Team	Pld	W	L	Pts	SW	SL	SR	SPW	SPL	SPR
1	(Cuba) González–Nivaldo	3	3	0	6	6	1	6.000	137	108	1.269
2	(Brazil) Álvaro–Saymon	3	2	1	5	5	2	2.500	130	109	1.193
3	(Austria) Kunert–Dressler	3	1	2	4	2	4	0.500	112	116	0.966
4	(Trinidad and Tobago) Williams–Phillip	3	0	3	3	0	6	0.000	85	131	0.649

Date	Time		Score		Set 1	Set 2	Set 3	Total	Report
29 Jul	13:00	Álvaro–Saymon (Brazil)	2–0	(Trinidad and Tobago) Williams–Phillip	21–11	21–11		42–22	Report
29 Jul	13:00	González–Nivaldo (Cuba)	2–0	(Austria) Kunert–Dressler	21–18	21–13		42–31	Report
31 Jul	12:00	Álvaro–Saymon (Brazil)	2–0	(Austria) Kunert–Dressler	21–17	21–17		42–34	Report
31 Jul	13:00	González–Nivaldo (Cuba)	2–0	(Trinidad and Tobago) Williams–Phillip	21–17	21–14		42–31	Report
2 Aug	11:30	Álvaro–Saymon (Brazil)	1–2	(Cuba) González–Nivaldo	21–17	15–21	10–15	46–53	Report
2 Aug	11:30	Kunert–Dressler (Austria)	2–0	(Trinidad and Tobago) Williams–Phillip	26–24	21–8		47–32	Report

=== Pool B ===
Pos	Team	Pld	W	L	Pts	SW	SL	SR	SPW	SPL	SPR
1	(Qatar) Jefferson–Cherif	3	3	0	6	6	1	6.000	142	122	1.164
2	(Latvia) Šmēdiņš–Samoilovs	3	2	1	5	4	2	2.000	120	106	1.132
3	(Germany) Böckermann–Flüggen	3	1	2	4	2	4	0.500	110	115	0.957
4	(Venezuela) Charly–Golindano	3	0	3	3	1	6	0.167	113	142	0.796

Date	Time		Score		Set 1	Set 2	Set 3	Total	Report
28 Jul	14:00	Jefferson–Cherif (Qatar)	2–0	(Germany) Böckermann–Flüggen	21–19	21–15		42–34	Report
28 Jul	15:00	Šmēdiņš–Samoilovs (Latvia)	2–0	(Venezuela) Charly–Golindano	21–19	21–11		42–30	Report
30 Jul	11:00	Šmēdiņš–Samoilovs (Latvia)	2–0	(Germany) Böckermann–Flüggen	21–19	21–15		42–34	Report
30 Jul	14:00	Jefferson–Cherif (Qatar)	2–1	(Venezuela) Charly–Golindano	21–18	22–24	15–10	58–52	Report
1 Aug	14:30	Böckermann–Flüggen (Germany)	2–0	(Venezuela) Charly–Golindano	21–15	21–16		42–31	Report
1 Aug	15:30	Šmēdiņš–Samoilovs (Latvia)	0–2	(Qatar) Jefferson–Cherif	17–21	19–21		36–42	Report

=== Pool C ===
Pos	Team	Pld	W	L	Pts	SW	SL	SR	SPW	SPL	SPR
1	(United States) Dalhausser–Lucena	3	3	0	6	6	1	6.000	138	120	1.150
2	(United States) Doherty–Hyden	3	2	1	5	5	2	2.500	137	101	1.356
3	(Poland) Prudel–Kujawiak	3	1	2	4	2	4	0.500	102	113	0.903
4	(Guatemala) Leonardo–García	3	0	3	3	0	6	0.000	83	126	0.659

Date	Time		Score		Set 1	Set 2	Set 3	Total	Report
29 Jul	10:00	Dalhausser–Lucena (United States)	2–1	(United States) Doherty–Hyden	17–21	21–18	16–14	54–53	Report
29 Jul	11:00	Prudel–Kujawiak (Poland)	2–0	(Guatemala) Leonardo–García	21–12	21–17		42–29	Report
31 Jul	14:00	Dalhausser–Lucena (United States)	2–0	(Guatemala) Leonardo–García	21–18	21–18		42–36	Report
31 Jul	15:00	Doherty–Hyden (United States)	2–0	(Poland) Prudel–Kujawiak	21–14	21–15		42–29	Report
2 Aug	9:30	Dalhausser–Lucena (United States)	2–0	(Poland) Prudel–Kujawiak	21–12	21–19		42–31	Report
2 Aug	9:30	Doherty–Hyden (United States)	2–0	(Guatemala) Leonardo–García	21–7	21–11		42–18	Report

=== Pool D ===
Pos	Team	Pld	W	L	Pts	SW	SL	SR	SPW	SPL	SPR
1	(Brazil) Evandro–André	3	2	1	5	5	3	1.667	150	138	1.087
2	(Netherlands) Varenhorst–van Garderen	3	2	1	5	5	2	2.500	135	125	1.080
3	(Mexico) Virgen–Ontiveros	3	2	1	5	4	3	1.333	131	135	0.970
4	(Cuba) Quesada–Piña	3	0	3	3	0	6	0.000	114	132	0.864

Date	Time		Score		Set 1	Set 2	Set 3	Total	Report
28 Jul	12:00	Evandro–André (Brazil)	2–1	(Netherlands) Varenhorst–van Garderen	20–22	23–21	15–7	58–50	Report
28 Jul	12:00	Virgen–Ontiveros (Mexico)	2–0	(Cuba) Quesada–Piña	26–24	21–19		47–43	Report
30 Jul	17:00	Evandro–André (Brazil)	2–0	(Cuba) Quesada–Piña	21–17	21–19		42–36	Report
30 Jul	19:00	Virgen–Ontiveros (Mexico)	0–2	(Netherlands) Varenhorst–van Garderen	19–21	13–21		32–42	Report
1 Aug	16:30	Evandro–André (Brazil)	1–2	(Mexico) Virgen–Ontiveros	19–21	21–16	10–15	50–52	Report
1 Aug	16:30	Quesada–Piña (Cuba)	0–2	(Netherlands) Varenhorst–van Garderen	15–21	20–22		35–43	Report

=== Pool E ===
Pos	Team	Pld	W	L	Pts	SW	SL	SR	SPW	SPL	SPR
1	(Brazil) Alison–Bruno	3	3	0	6	6	0	MAX	126	91	1.385
2	(Chile) Grimalt–Grimalt	3	2	1	5	4	2	2.000	111	103	1.078
3	(Latvia) Pļaviņš–Regža	3	1	2	4	2	4	0.500	113	115	0.983
4	(Mozambique) Nguvo–Tovela	3	0	3	3	0	6	0.000	85	126	0.675

Date	Time		Score		Set 1	Set 2	Set 3	Total	Report
29 Jul	12:00	Grimalt–Grimalt (Chile)	2–0	(Latvia) Pļaviņš–Regža	21–14	21–19		42–33	Report
29 Jul	14:00	Alison–Bruno (Brazil)	2–0	(Mozambique) Nguvo–Tovela	21–13	21–13		42–26	Report
31 Jul	18:00	Alison–Bruno (Brazil)	2–0	(Latvia) Pļaviņš–Regža	21–19	21–19		42–38	Report
31 Jul	18:00	Grimalt–Grimalt (Chile)	2–0	(Mozambique) Nguvo–Tovela	21–15	21–13		42–28	Report
2 Aug	10:30	Alison–Bruno (Brazil)	2–0	(Chile) Grimalt–Grimalt	21–14	21–13		42–27	Report
2 Aug	10:30	Pļaviņš–Regža (Latvia)	2–0	(Mozambique) Nguvo–Tovela	21–15	21–16		42–31	Report

=== Pool F ===
Pos	Team	Pld	W	L	Pts	SW	SL	SR	SPW	SPL	SPR
1	(Russia) Krasilnikov–Liamin	3	3	0	6	6	0	MAX	126	91	1.385
2	(Belgium) Koekelkoren–van Walle	3	2	1	5	4	3	1.333	131	125	1.048
3	(Latvia) Tocs–Finsters	3	1	2	4	3	4	0.750	121	132	0.917
4	(Morocco) Abicha–Elgraoui	3	0	3	3	0	6	0.000	100	130	0.769

Date	Time		Score		Set 1	Set 2	Set 3	Total	Report
28 Jul	10:00	Koekelkoren–van Walle (Belgium)	2–1	(Latvia) Tocs–Finsters	21–14	19–21	15–13	55–48	Report
28 Jul	11:00	Krasilnikov–Liamin (Russia)	2–0	(Morocco) Abicha–Elgraoui	21–16	21–14		42–30	Report
30 Jul	10:00	Krasilnikov–Liamin (Russia)	2–0	(Latvia) Tocs–Finsters	21–14	21–16		42–30	Report
30 Jul	18:00	Koekelkoren–van Walle (Belgium)	2–0	(Morocco) Abicha–Elgraoui	21–13	24–22		45–35	Report
1 Aug	11:30	Krasilnikov–Liamin (Russia)	2–0	(Belgium) Koekelkoren–van Walle	21–16	21–15		42–31	Report
1 Aug	13:30	Tocs–Finsters (Latvia)	2–0	(Morocco) Abicha–Elgraoui	21–15	22–20		43–35	Report

=== Pool G ===
Pos	Team	Pld	W	L	Pts	SW	SL	SR	SPW	SPL	SPR
1	(Poland) Łosiak–Kantor	3	3	0	6	6	1	6.000	144	114	1.263
2	(United States) Gibb–Crabb	3	2	1	5	5	2	2.500	140	122	1.148
3	(Argentina) Capogrosso–Azaad	3	1	2	4	2	4	0.500	107	109	0.982
4	(Paraguay) Goyo–Róger	3	0	3	3	0	6	0.000	80	126	0.635

Date	Time		Score		Set 1	Set 2	Set 3	Total	Report
29 Jul	18:00	Gibb–Crabb (United States)	2–0	(Argentina) Capogrosso–Azaad	21–18	21–17		42–35	Report
29 Jul	19:00	Łosiak–Kantor (Poland)	2–0	(Paraguay) Goyo–Róger	21–16	21–12		42–28	Report
31 Jul	12:00	Gibb–Crabb (United States)	2–0	(Paraguay) Goyo–Róger	21–13	21–14		42–27	Report
31 Jul	13:00	Łosiak–Kantor (Poland)	2–0	(Argentina) Capogrosso–Azaad	21–15	21–15		42–30	Report
1 Aug	13:30	Łosiak–Kantor (Poland)	2–1	(United States) Gibb–Crabb	21–17	21–23	18–16	60–56	Report
1 Aug	14:30	Capogrosso–Azaad (Argentina)	2–0	(Paraguay) Goyo–Róger	21–10	21–15		42–25	Report

=== Pool H ===
Pos	Team	Pld	W	L	Pts	SW	SL	SR	SPW	SPL	SPR
1	(Brazil) Pedro–Guto	3	3	0	6	6	1	6.000	136	106	1.283
2	(United States) Brunner–Patterson	3	2	1	5	5	2	2.500	129	116	1.112
3	(Austria) Seidl–Winter	3	1	2	4	2	4	0.500	109	117	0.932
4	(South Africa) Naidoo–Williams	3	0	3	3	0	6	0.000	91	126	0.722

Date	Time		Score		Set 1	Set 2	Set 3	Total	Report
29 Jul	15:00	Brunner–Patterson (United States)	2–0	(Austria) Seidl–Winter	21–17	21–17		42–34	Report
29 Jul	16:00	Pedro–Guto (Brazil)	2–0	(South Africa) Naidoo–Williams	21–13	21–15		42–28	Report
31 Jul	19:00	Pedro–Guto (Brazil)	2–0	(Austria) Seidl–Winter	21–19	21–14		42–33	Report
31 Jul	19:00	Brunner–Patterson (United States)	2–0	(South Africa) Naidoo–Williams	21–18	21–12		42–30	Report
2 Aug	10:30	Seidl–Winter (Austria)	2–0	(South Africa) Naidoo–Williams	21–17	21–16		42–33	Report
2 Aug	12:30	Pedro–Guto (Brazil)	2–1	(United States) Brunner–Patterson	16–21	21–17	15–7	52–45	Report

=== Pool I ===
Pos	Team	Pld	W	L	Pts	SW	SL	SR	SPW	SPL	SPR
1	(Spain) Herrera–Gavira	3	3	0	6	6	0	MAX	129	96	1.344
2	(Canada) Pedlow–Schachter	3	2	1	5	4	3	1.333	134	113	1.186
3	(Austria) Ermacora–Pristauz	3	1	2	4	3	4	0.750	114	126	0.905
4	(Indonesia) Candra–Ashfiya	3	0	3	3	0	6	0.000	84	126	0.667

Date	Time		Score		Set 1	Set 2	Set 3	Total	Report
28 Jul	19:00	Herrera–Gavira (Spain)	2–0	(Austria) Ermacora–Pristauz	21–15	21–14		42–29	Report
28 Jul	19:00	Pedlow–Schachter (Canada)	2–0	(Indonesia) Candra–Ashfiya	21–13	21–12		42–25	Report
30 Jul	12:00	Herrera–Gavira (Spain)	2–0	(Indonesia) Candra–Ashfiya	21–14	21–15		42–29	Report
30 Jul	12:00	Pedlow–Schachter (Canada)	2–1	(Austria) Ermacora–Pristauz	21–11	18–21	15–11	54–43	Report
1 Aug	12:30	Herrera–Gavira (Spain)	2–0	(Canada) Pedlow–Schachter	21–16	24–22		45–38	Report
1 Aug	15:30	Candra–Ashfiya (Indonesia)	0–2	(Austria) Ermacora–Pristauz	18–21	12–21		30–42	Report

=== Pool J ===
Pos	Team	Pld	W	L	Pts	SW	SL	SR	SPW	SPL	SPR
1	(Netherlands) Brouwer–Meeuwsen	3	3	0	6	6	0	MAX	127	102	1.245
2	(Poland) Fijałek–Bryl	3	2	1	5	4	2	2.000	122	111	1.099
3	(Italy) Ranghieri–Carambula	3	1	2	4	2	4	0.500	110	117	0.940
4	(Uruguay) Vieyto–Cairus	3	0	3	3	0	6	0.000	104	133	0.782

Date	Time		Score		Set 1	Set 2	Set 3	Total	Report
28 Jul	16:00	Brouwer–Meeuwsen (Netherlands)	2–0	(Uruguay) Vieyto–Cairus	21–15	22–20		43–35	Report
28 Jul	18:00	Fijałek–Bryl (Poland)	2–0	(Italy) Ranghieri–Carambula	21–18	21–15		42–33	Report
30 Jul	13:00	Fijałek–Bryl (Poland)	2–0	(Uruguay) Vieyto–Cairus	27–25	21–11		48–36	Report
30 Jul	15:00	Brouwer–Meeuwsen (Netherlands)	2–0	(Italy) Ranghieri–Carambula	21–16	21–19		42–35	Report
1 Aug	13:30	Brouwer–Meeuwsen (Netherlands)	2–0	(Poland) Fijałek–Bryl	21–14	21–18		42–32	Report
1 Aug	14:30	Ranghieri–Carambula (Italy)	2–0	(Uruguay) Vieyto–Cairus	21–15	21–18		42–33	Report

=== Pool K ===
Pos	Team	Pld	W	L	Pts	SW	SL	SR	SPW	SPL	SPR
1	(Italy) Nicolai–Lupo	3	3	0	6	6	1	6.000	140	94	1.489
2	(Australia) McHugh–Schumann	3	2	1	5	4	2	2.000	113	101	1.119
3	(Russia) Stoyanovskiy–Yarzutkin	3	1	2	4	3	4	0.750	134	130	1.031
4	(Sierra Leone) Lombi–Kamara	3	0	3	3	0	6	0.000	64	126	0.508

Date	Time		Score		Set 1	Set 2	Set 3	Total	Report
29 Jul	12:00	Nicolai–Lupo (Italy)	2–0	(Sierra Leone) Lombi–Kamara	21–7	21–8		42–15	Report
29 Jul	15:00	Stoyanovskiy–Yarzutkin (Russia)	0–2	(Australia) McHugh–Schumann	19–21	21–23		40–44	Report
31 Jul	15:00	Nicolai–Lupo (Italy)	2–0	(Australia) McHugh–Schumann	21–15	21–12		42–27	Report
31 Jul	17:00	Stoyanovskiy–Yarzutkin (Russia)	2–0	(Sierra Leone) Lombi–Kamara	21–15	21–15		42–30	Report
1 Aug	15:30	Nicolai–Lupo (Italy)	2–1	(Russia) Stoyanovskiy–Yarzutkin	21–17	20–22	15–13	56–52	Report
1 Aug	16:30	McHugh–Schumann (Australia)	2–0	(Sierra Leone) Lombi–Kamara	21–8	21–11		42–19	Report

=== Pool L ===
Pos	Team	Pld	W	L	Pts	SW	SL	SR	SPW	SPL	SPR
1	(Canada) Saxton–Schalk	3	3	0	6	6	2	3.000	152	137	1.109
2	(Austria) Doppler–Horst	3	2	1	5	5	2	2.500	137	115	1.191
3	(Canada) Vandenburg–Nusbaum	3	1	2	4	2	4	0.500	102	122	0.836
4	(Iran) Raoufi–Salemi	3	0	3	3	1	6	0.167	123	140	0.879

Date	Time		Score		Set 1	Set 2	Set 3	Total	Report
28 Jul	16:00	Doppler–Horst (Austria)	2–0	(Iran) Raoufi–Salemi	21–19	21–15		42–34	Report
28 Jul	16:00	Saxton–Schalk (Canada)	2–0	(Canada) Vandenburg–Nusbaum	21–14	21–19		42–33	Report
30 Jul	15:00	Saxton–Schalk (Canada)	2–1	(Iran) Raoufi–Salemi	20–22	21–16	15–13	56–51	Report
30 Jul	19:00	Doppler–Horst (Austria)	2–0	(Canada) Vandenburg–Nusbaum	21–12	21–15		42–27	Report
1 Aug	18:45	Doppler–Horst (Austria)	1–2	(Canada) Saxton–Schalk	19–21	21–18	13–15	53–54	Report
1 Aug	18:45	Raoufi–Salemi (Iran)	0–2	(Canada) Vandenburg–Nusbaum	19–21	19–21		38–42	Report

=== 3rd place ranked teams ===
The four best third-placed teams will advance directly to the round of 32. The other eight third-placed teams will play in the Lucky Losers Playoffs for the additional four spots in the Round of 32.

Pos	Team	Pld	W	L	Pts	SW	SL	SR	SPW	SPL	SPR
1	(Mexico) Virgen–Ontiveros	3	2	1	5	4	3	1.333	131	135	0.970
2	(Russia) Stoyanovskiy–Yarzutkin	3	1	2	4	3	4	0.750	134	130	1.031
3	(Latvia) Tocs–Finsters	3	1	2	4	3	4	0.750	121	132	0.917
4	(Austria) Ermacora–Pristauz	3	1	2	4	3	4	0.750	114	126	0.905
5	(Latvia) Pļaviņš–Regža	3	1	2	4	2	4	0.500	113	115	0.983
6	(Argentina) Capogrosso–Azaad	3	1	2	4	2	4	0.500	107	109	0.982
7	(Austria) Kunert–Dressler	3	1	2	4	2	4	0.500	112	116	0.966
8	(Germany) Böckermann–Flüggen	3	1	2	4	2	4	0.500	110	115	0.957
9	(Italy) Ranghieri–Carambula	3	1	2	4	2	4	0.500	110	117	0.940
10	(Austria) Seidl–Winter	3	1	2	4	2	4	0.500	109	117	0.932
11	(Poland) Prudel–Kujawiak	3	1	2	4	2	4	0.500	102	113	0.903
12	(Canada) Vandenburg–Nusbaum	3	1	2	4	2	4	0.500	102	122	0.836

== Lucky losers playoffs ==
Date	Time		Score		Set 1	Set 2	Set 3	Total	Report
2 Aug	17:30	Kunert–Dressler (Austria)	0–2	(Austria) Seidl–Winter	23–25	20–22		43–47	Report
2 Aug	18:45	Pļaviņš–Regža (Latvia)	2–0	(Canada) Vandenburg–Nusbaum	21–11	21–18		42–29	Report
2 Aug	18:45	Capogrosso–Azaad (Argentina)	0–2	(Poland) Prudel–Kujawiak	19–21	17–21		36–42	Report
2 Aug	18:45	Böckermann–Flüggen (Germany)	1–2	(Italy) Ranghieri–Carambula	10–21	21–18	8–15	39–54	Report

== Knockout stage ==
Round of 32
3 August
González – Nivaldo (CUB)	2
Seidl – Winter (AUT)	0
3 August
Varenhorst – van Garderen (NED)	2
Álvaro – Saymon (BRA)	0
3 August
Herrera – Gavira (ESP)	2
Fijałek – Bryl (POL)	0
3 August
Ermacora – Pristauz (AUT)	1
Pedro – Guto (BRA)	2
3 August
Alison – Bruno (BRA)	2
Tocs – Finsters (LAT)	0
3 August
Grimalt – Grimalt (CHI)	0
Saxton – Schalk (CAN)	2
3 August
Doherty – Hyden (USA)	1
Šmēdiņš – Samoilovs (LAT)	2
3 August
Pļaviņš – Regža (LAT)	0
Evandro – André (BRA)	2
3 August
Dalhausser – Lucena (USA)	2
Ranghieri – Carambula (ITA)	0
3 August
Gibb – Crabb (USA)	0
McHugh – Schumann (AUS)	2
3 August
Nicolai – Lupo (ITA)	0
Pedlow – Schachter (CAN)	2
3 August
Stoyanovskiy – Yarzutkin (RUS)	1
Krasilnikov – Liamin (RUS)	2
3 August
Łosiak – Kantor (POL)	2
Virgen – Ontiveros (MEX)	1
3 August
Koekelkoren – van Walle (BEL)	2
Brouwer – Meeuwsen (NED)	1
3 August
Doppler – Horst (AUT)	2
Brunner – Patterson (USA)	1
3 August
Prudel – Kujawiak (POL)	0
Jefferson – Cherif (QAT)	2

Round of 16
4 August
González – Nivaldo (CUB)	1
Varenhorst – van Garderen (NED)	2
4 August
Herrera – Gavira (ESP)	2
Pedro – Guto (BRA)	1
4 August
Alison – Bruno (BRA)	1
Saxton – Schalk (CAN)	2
4 August
Šmēdiņš – Samoilovs (LAT)	0
Evandro – André (BRA)	2
4 August
Dalhausser – Lucena (USA)	2
McHugh – Schumann (AUS)	1
4 August
Pedlow – Schachter (CAN)	0
Krasilnikov – Liamin (RUS)	2
4 August
Łosiak – Kantor (POL)	2
Koekelkoren – van Walle (BEL)	1
4 August
Doppler – Horst (AUT)	2
Jefferson – Cherif (QAT)	0

Quarter-finals
5 August
Varenhorst – van Garderen (NED)	2
Herrera – Gavira (ESP)	1
5 August
Saxton – Schalk (CAN)	1
Evandro – André (BRA)	2
5 August
Dalhausser – Lucena (USA)	0
Krasilnikov – Liamin (RUS)	2
5 August
Łosiak – Kantor (POL)	1
Doppler – Horst (AUT)	2

Semi-finals
6 August
Varenhorst – van Garderen (NED)	0
Evandro – André (BRA)	2
6 August
Krasilnikov – Liamin (RUS)	0
Doppler – Horst (AUT)	2

Final
6 August
Evandro – André (BRA)	2
Doppler – Horst (AUT)	0
3rd place match
6 August
Varenhorst – van Garderen (NED)	0
Krasilnikov – Liamin (RUS)	2

=== Round of 32 ===
Date	Time		Score		Set 1	Set 2	Set 3	Total	Report
3 Aug	11:30	Grimalt–Grimalt (Chile)	0–2	(Canada) Saxton–Schalk	21–23	16–21		37–44	Report
3 Aug	12:30	Alison–Bruno (Brazil)	2–0	(Latvia) Tocs–Finsters	21–15	21–7		42–22	Report
3 Aug	13:30	Varenhorst–van Garderen (Netherlands)	2–0	(Brazil) Álvaro–Saymon	21–17	21–18		42–35	Report
3 Aug	13:30	Pļaviņš–Regža (Latvia)	0–2	(Brazil) Evandro–André	13–21	18–21		31–42	Report
3 Aug	13:30	Dalhausser–Lucena (United States)	2–0	(Italy) Ranghieri–Carambula	21–18	21–17		42–35	Report
3 Aug	14:30	Gibb–Crabb (United States)	0–2	(Australia) McHugh–Schumann	19–21	26–28		45–49	Report
3 Aug	15:30	González–Nivaldo (Cuba)	2–0	(Austria) Seidl–Winter	21–16	21–19		42–35	Report
3 Aug	15:30	Doherty–Hyden (United States)	1–2	(Latvia) Šmēdiņš–Samoilovs	21–23	21–18	12–15	54–56	Report
3 Aug	15:30	Prudel–Kujawiak (Poland)	0–2	(Qatar) Jefferson–Cherif	19–21	23–25		42–46	Report
3 Aug	16:30	Stoyanovskiy–Yarzutkin (Russia)	1–2	(Russia) Krasilnikov–Liamin	21–16	20–22	10–15	51–53	Report
3 Aug	17:30	Nicolai–Lupo (Italy)	0–2	(Canada) Pedlow–Schachter	19–21	19–21		38–42	Report
3 Aug	17:30	Łosiak–Kantor (Poland)	2–1	(Mexico) Virgen–Ontiveros	21–12	18–21	15–9	54–42	Report
3 Aug	17:30	Doppler–Horst (Austria)	2–1	(United States) Brunner–Patterson	18–21	21–19	15–10	54–50	Report
3 Aug	18:45	Herrera–Gavira (Spain)	2–0	(Poland) Fijałek–Bryl	21–19	21–19		42–38	Report
3 Aug	18:45	Koekelkoren–van Walle (Belgium)	2–1	(Netherlands) Brouwer–Meeuwsen	17–21	22–20	15–8	54–49	Report
3 Aug	18:45	Ermacora–Pristauz (Austria)	1–2	(Brazil) Pedro–Guto	23–21	16–21	15–17	54–59	Report

=== Round of 16 ===
Date	Time		Score		Set 1	Set 2	Set 3	Total	Report
4 Aug	11:00	Alison–Bruno (Brazil)	1–2	(Canada) Saxton–Schalk	19–21	21–19	13–15	53–55	Report
4 Aug	11:00	Šmēdiņš–Samoilovs (Latvia)	0–2	(Brazil) Evandro–André	22–24	19–21		41–45	Report
4 Aug	14:00	González–Nivaldo (Cuba)	1–2	(Netherlands) Varenhorst–van Garderen	13–21	23–21	13–15	49–57	Report
4 Aug	14:00	Herrera–Gavira (Spain)	2–1	(Brazil) Pedro–Guto	21–19	17–21	15–13	53–53	Report
4 Aug	15:00	Dalhausser–Lucena (United States)	2–1	(Australia) McHugh–Schumann	21–14	19–21	16–14	56–49	Report
4 Aug	15:00	Pedlow–Schachter (Canada)	0–2	(Russia) Krasilnikov–Liamin	14–21	18–21		32–42	Report
4 Aug	16:15	Łosiak–Kantor (Poland)	2–1	(Belgium) Koekelkoren–van Walle	21–19	19–21	15–7	55–47	Report
4 Aug	16:15	Doppler–Horst (Austria)	2–0	(Qatar) Jefferson–Cherif	26–24	24–22		50–46	Report

=== Quarterfinals ===
Date	Time		Score		Set 1	Set 2	Set 3	Total	Report
5 Aug	10:00	Saxton–Schalk (Canada)	1–2	(Brazil) Evandro–André	21–17	20–22	10–15	51–54	Report
5 Aug	11:00	Varenhorst–van Garderen (Netherlands)	2–1	(Spain) Herrera–Gavira	20–22	21–19	16–14	57–55	Report
5 Aug	16:00	Dalhausser–Lucena (United States)	0–2	(Russia) Krasilnikov–Liamin	15–21	18–21		33–42	Report
5 Aug	17:15	Łosiak–Kantor (Poland)	1–2	(Austria) Doppler–Horst	33–31	18–21	11–15	62–67	Report

=== Semifinals ===
Date	Time		Score		Set 1	Set 2	Set 3	Total	Report
6 Aug	10:00	Varenhorst–van Garderen (Netherlands)	0–2	(Brazil) Evandro–André	15–21	13–21		28–42	Report
6 Aug	11:00	Krasilnikov–Liamin (Russia)	0–2	(Austria) Doppler–Horst	20–22	19–21		39–43	Report

=== Third place match ===
Date	Time		Score		Set 1	Set 2	Set 3	Total	Report
6 Aug	13:45	Varenhorst–van Garderen (Netherlands)	0–2	(Russia) Krasilnikov–Liamin	17–21	17–21		34–42	Report

=== Final ===
Date	Time		Score		Set 1	Set 2	Set 3	Total	Report
6 Aug	15:00	Evandro–André (Brazil)	2–0	(Austria) Doppler–Horst	23–21	22–20		45–41	Report
