= Beach volleyball at the 2016 Summer Olympics – Men's tournament =

Men's beach volleyball at the Games of the XXXI Olympiad
- Venue: Copacabana Stadium
- Dates: 6–18 August 2016
- Competitors: 48 from 16 nations
- Teams: 24

Medalists
1st place, gold medalist(s)		Alison Cerutti; Bruno Oscar Schmidt	Brazil
2nd place, silver medalist(s)		Daniele Lupo; Paolo Nicolai	Italy
3rd place, bronze medalist(s)		Alexander Brouwer; Robert Meeuwsen	Netherlands

The men's beach volleyball tournament at the 2016 Olympic Games in Rio de Janeiro, Brazil, took place at the Copacabana Stadium. The competition was held from 6 to 18 August 2016. Twenty four teams with 48 athletes around the world competed for the gold medal.

The medals for the tournament were presented by Bernard Rajzman, Brazil, member of the International Olympic Committee, and the gifts were presented by Dr. Ary Graça Filho, President of the Fédération Internationale de Volleyball.

== Qualification ==
Means of qualification	Date	Venue	Vacancies	Qualified
Host country	2 October 2009	(Denmark) Copenhagen	1	Brazil
2015 World Championships	26 June – 5 July 2015	Netherlands	1	Brazil
FIVB Beach Volleyball Olympic Ranking	13 June 2016	(Switzerland) Lausanne	15	Netherlands
FIVB Beach Volleyball Olympic Ranking	13 June 2016	(Switzerland) Lausanne	15	United States
FIVB Beach Volleyball Olympic Ranking	13 June 2016	(Switzerland) Lausanne	15	Netherlands
FIVB Beach Volleyball Olympic Ranking	13 June 2016	(Switzerland) Lausanne	15	United States
FIVB Beach Volleyball Olympic Ranking	13 June 2016	(Switzerland) Lausanne	15	Spain
FIVB Beach Volleyball Olympic Ranking	13 June 2016	(Switzerland) Lausanne	15	Latvia
FIVB Beach Volleyball Olympic Ranking	13 June 2016	(Switzerland) Lausanne	15	Russia
FIVB Beach Volleyball Olympic Ranking	13 June 2016	(Switzerland) Lausanne	15	Italy
FIVB Beach Volleyball Olympic Ranking	13 June 2016	(Switzerland) Lausanne	15	Poland
FIVB Beach Volleyball Olympic Ranking	13 June 2016	(Switzerland) Lausanne	15	Italy
FIVB Beach Volleyball Olympic Ranking	13 June 2016	(Switzerland) Lausanne	15	Austria
FIVB Beach Volleyball Olympic Ranking	13 June 2016	(Switzerland) Lausanne	15	Poland
FIVB Beach Volleyball Olympic Ranking	13 June 2016	(Switzerland) Lausanne	15	Germany
FIVB Beach Volleyball Olympic Ranking	13 June 2016	(Switzerland) Lausanne	15	Canada
FIVB Beach Volleyball Olympic Ranking	13 June 2016	(Switzerland) Lausanne	15	Mexico
2014–2016 AVC Continental Cup	20–26 June 2016	(Australia) Cairns	1	Qatar
2014–2016 CAVB Continental Cup	3–9 May 2016	(Tunisia) Kelibia	1	Tunisia
2014–2016 CEV Continental Cup	22–26 June 2016	(Norway) Stavanger	1	Austria
2014–2016 CSV Continental Cup	22–26 June 2016	(Chile) Santiago	1	Chile
2014–2016 NORCECA Continental Cup	20–26 June 2016	(Mexico) Guaymas	1	Cuba
2016 FIVB World Continental Cup	6–10 July 2016	(Russia) Sochi	2	Canada
2016 FIVB World Continental Cup	6–10 July 2016	(Russia) Sochi	2	Russia
Total			24	

== Pools composition ==
Twenty four teams were drawn in six pools of four teams. The top six teams from the FIVB beach volleyball Olympic ranking as of 12 June 2016 were seeded at the first row of each pools from pool A to F. The seventh to ninth from the ranking were drawn first in pool F, E, or D. Then, the tenth to twelfth were drawn in pool C, B, or A. The drawing of lots number three belonged the thirteenth to seventeenth teams. They were drawn in pool A to E. The remaining spot of third row were one of five confederation continental cup champions. Next, the four remaining were drawn in pool F to C. Finally the winners and runners-up from World continental cup were drawn last two spots. The teams from the same national Olympic committee could not be the same pool, except the last drawing.

Group	Team	NOC
Seeding	Alison Cerutti / Bruno Oscar Schmidt	Brazil
Seeding	Alexander Brouwer / Robert Meeuwsen	Netherlands
Seeding	Phil Dalhausser / Nick Lucena	United States
Seeding	Evandro Oliveira / Pedro Solberg Salgado	Brazil
Seeding	Reinder Nummerdor / Christiaan Varenhorst	Netherlands
Seeding	Jake Gibb / Casey Patterson	United States
Draw 1	Adrián Gavira / Pablo Herrera	Spain
Draw 1	Aleksandrs Samoilovs / Jānis Šmēdiņš	Latvia
Draw 1	Viacheslav Krasilnikov / Konstantin Semenov	Russia
Draw 2	Daniele Lupo / Paolo Nicolai	Italy
Draw 2	Piotr Kantor / Bartosz Łosiak	Poland
Draw 2	Adrian Carambula / Alex Ranghieri	Italy
Draw 3	Clemens Doppler / Alexander Horst	Austria
Draw 3	Grzegorz Fijałek / Mariusz Prudel	Poland
Draw 3	Markus Böckermann / Lars Flüggen	Germany
Draw 3	Ben Saxton / Chaim Schalk	Canada
Draw 3	Lombardo Ontiveros / Juan Virgen	Mexico
Draw 4–5	Jefferson Pereira / Cherif Younousse	Qatar
Draw 4–5	Mohamed Arafet Naceur / Choaib Belhaj Salah	Tunisia
Draw 4–5	Alexander Huber / Robin Seidl	Austria
Draw 4–5	Esteban Grimalt / Marco Grimalt	Chile
Draw 4–5	Nivaldo Díaz / Sergio González	Cuba
Draw 6	Josh Binstock / Sam Schachter	Canada
Draw 6	Dmitri Barsouk / Nikita Liamin	Russia

Draw

Pool A	Pool B	Pool C
Alison – Bruno Schmidt (BRA)	Brouwer – Meeuwsen (NED)	Dalhausser – Lucena (USA)
Carambula – Ranghieri (ITA)	Kantor – Łosiak (POL)	Lupo – Nicolai (ITA)
Doppler – Horst (AUT)	Böckermann – Flüggen (GER)	Ontiveros – Virgen (MEX)
Binstock – Schachter (CAN)	Barsouk – Liamin (RUS)	Belhaj – Naceur (TUN)

Pool D	Pool E	Pool F
Evandro – Pedro Solberg (BRA)	Nummerdor – Varenhorst (NED)	Gibb – Patterson (USA)
Samoilovs – Šmēdiņš (LAT)	Krasilnikov – Semenov (RUS)	Gavira – Herrera (ESP)
Saxton – Schalk (CAN)	Fijałek – Prudel (POL)	Huber – Seidl (AUT)
Díaz – González (CUB)	Grimalt E. – Grimalt M. (CHI)	Cherif – Jefferson (QAT)

== Venue ==
Rio de Janeiro, Brazil
Copacabana Stadium
Capacity: 12,000
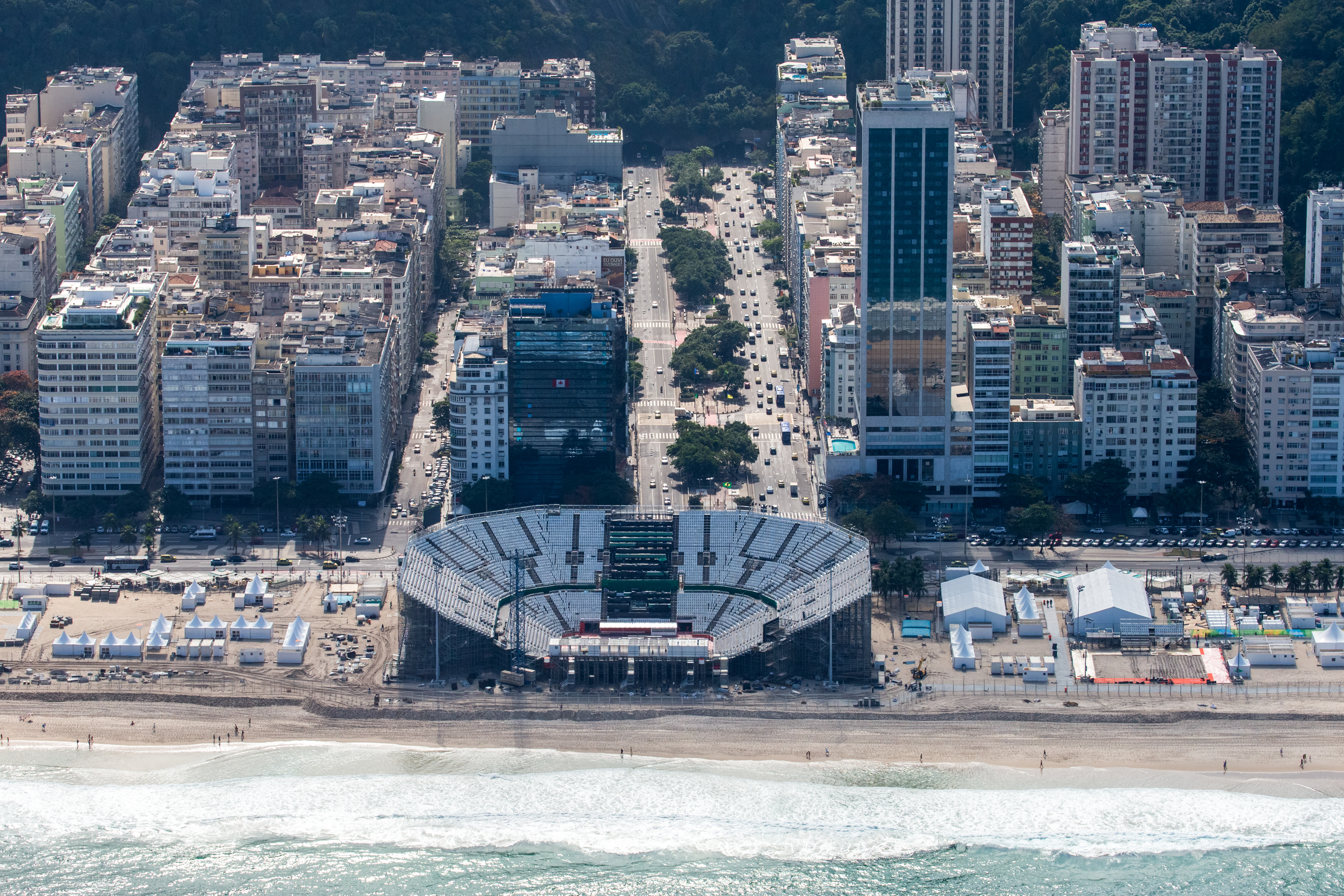

== Format ==
The preliminary round was a competition between the twenty four teams divided into six groups of four teams. This round, the teams competed in a single round-robin format. The two highest ranked teams in each group and the two best third ranked teams advanced automatically to the knockout stage. The other four third ranked teams faced the lucky loser playoffs to take the last two spots. The fourth placed teams in each pool were ranked nineteenth in this competition. The losers from the lucky loser playoffs were tied seventeenth. The knockout stage followed the single-elimination format. The losers in the round of sixteen were ranked ninth. The four quarter-final losers finished fifth. The winners of the semi-finals competed for gold medals and the losers played for bronze medals.

== Pool standing procedure ==
1. Match points (2 for the winner, 1 for the loser, 0 for forfeit)
2. Between 2 teams consider all teams points ratio / Between 3 teams consider head-to-head points ratio
3. Seeding position of the pools composition

== Referees ==
The following referees were selected for the tournament.

- (Argentina) Osvaldo Sumavil
- (Brazil) Mário Ferro
- (Brazil) Elizir Martins de Oliveira
- (Canada) Lucie Guillemette
- (China) Wang Lijun
- (Colombia) Juan Carlos Saavedra
- (Greece) Charalampos Papadogoulas
- (Italy) Davide Crescentini
- (Japan) Mariko Satomi
- (Puerto Rico) Carlos L. Rivera Rodriguez
- (Russia) Roman Pristovakin
- (South Africa) Giovanni Bake
- (Spain) José Maria Padron
- (Switzerland) Jonas Personeni
- (Thailand) Kritsada Panaseri
- (United States) Daniel Apol

== Preliminary round ==
- All times are Brasília Time (UTC−03:00).

=== Pool A ===
Pos	Team	Pld	W	L	Pts	SW	SL	SR	SPW	SPL	SPR	Qualification
1	Carambula – Ranghieri (ITA)	3	2	1	5	4	3	1.333	127	119	1.067	Round of 16
2	Alison – Bruno Schmidt (BRA)	3	2	1	5	5	2	2.500	140	128	1.094	Round of 16
3	Doppler – Horst (AUT)	3	2	1	5	4	4	1.000	133	145	0.917	Round of 16
4	Binstock – Schachter (CAN)	3	0	3	3	2	6	0.333	137	145	0.945	

Source: FIVB

6 August 2016; 10:00	Carambula – Ranghieri (Italy)	2–0	(Austria) Doppler – Horst	Copacabana Stadium, Rio de Janeiro; Referees: Mário Ferro (BRA), Osvaldo Sumavil (ARG)
6 August 2016; 10:00	(21–14, 21–13); Report			Copacabana Stadium, Rio de Janeiro; Referees: Mário Ferro (BRA), Osvaldo Sumavil (ARG)

6 August 2016; 11:00	Alison – Bruno Schmidt (Brazil)	2–0	(Canada) Binstock – Schachter	Copacabana Stadium, Rio de Janeiro; Referees: Roman Pristovakin (RUS), Wang Lijun (CHN)
6 August 2016; 11:00	(21–19, 22–20); Report			Copacabana Stadium, Rio de Janeiro; Referees: Roman Pristovakin (RUS), Wang Lijun (CHN)

8 August 2016; 15:30	Alison – Bruno Schmidt (Brazil)	1–2	(Austria) Doppler – Horst	Copacabana Stadium, Rio de Janeiro; Attendance: 8,593; Referees: Daniel Apol (USA), Kritsada Panaseri (THA)
8 August 2016; 15:30	(21–23, 21–16, 13–15); Report			Copacabana Stadium, Rio de Janeiro; Attendance: 8,593; Referees: Daniel Apol (USA), Kritsada Panaseri (THA)

8 August 2016; 21:00	Carambula – Ranghieri (Italy)	2–1	(Canada) Binstock – Schachter	Copacabana Stadium, Rio de Janeiro; Referees: Osvaldo Sumavil (ARG), Jonas Personeni (SUI)
8 August 2016; 21:00	(21–18, 14–21, 15–11); Report			Copacabana Stadium, Rio de Janeiro; Referees: Osvaldo Sumavil (ARG), Jonas Personeni (SUI)

10 August 2016; 15:30	Alison – Bruno Schmidt (Brazil)	2–0	(Italy) Carambula – Ranghieri	Copacabana Stadium, Rio de Janeiro; Attendance: 6,531; Referees: José Padron (ESP), Carlos Rodríguez (PUR)
10 August 2016; 15:30	(21–19, 21–16); Report			Copacabana Stadium, Rio de Janeiro; Attendance: 6,531; Referees: José Padron (ESP), Carlos Rodríguez (PUR)

11 August 2016; 00:00	Doppler – Horst (Austria)	2–1	(Canada) Binstock – Schachter	Copacabana Stadium, Rio de Janeiro; Attendance: 1,953; Referees: Jonas Personeni (SUI), Giovanni Bake (RSA)
11 August 2016; 00:00	(21–19, 16–21, 15–8); Report			Copacabana Stadium, Rio de Janeiro; Attendance: 1,953; Referees: Jonas Personeni (SUI), Giovanni Bake (RSA)

=== Pool B ===
Pos	Team	Pld	W	L	Pts	SW	SL	SR	SPW	SPL	SPR	Qualification
1	Brouwer – Meeuwsen (NED)	3	3	0	6	6	1	6.000	138	121	1.140	Round of 16
2	Barsouk – Liamin (RUS)	3	2	1	5	4	2	2.000	113	194	0.582	Round of 16
3	Kantor – Łosiak (POL)	3	1	2	4	2	4	0.500	113	116	0.974	Lucky losers
4	Böckermann – Flüggen (GER)	3	0	3	3	1	6	0.167	117	140	0.836	

Source: FIVB

6 August 2016; 17:30	Brouwer – Meeuwsen (Netherlands)	2–0	(Russia) Barsouk – Liamin	Copacabana Stadium, Rio de Janeiro; Referees: Juan Saavedra (COL), Daniel Apol (USA)
6 August 2016; 17:30	(21–15, 21–14); Report			Copacabana Stadium, Rio de Janeiro; Referees: Juan Saavedra (COL), Daniel Apol (USA)

6 August 2016; 21:00	Kantor – Łosiak (Poland)	2–0	(Germany) Böckermann – Flüggen	Copacabana Stadium, Rio de Janeiro; Attendance: 3,135; Referees: Lucie Guillemette (CAN), Mário Ferro (BRA)
6 August 2016; 21:00	(21–11, 23–21); Report			Copacabana Stadium, Rio de Janeiro; Attendance: 3,135; Referees: Lucie Guillemette (CAN), Mário Ferro (BRA)

8 August 2016; 12:00	Kantor – Łosiak (Poland)	0–2	(Russia) Barsouk – Liamin	Copacabana Stadium, Rio de Janeiro; Referees: Mário Ferro (BRA), Jonas Personeni (SUI)
8 August 2016; 12:00	(14–21, 17–21); Report			Copacabana Stadium, Rio de Janeiro; Referees: Mário Ferro (BRA), Jonas Personeni (SUI)

8 August 2016; 18:30	Brouwer – Meeuwsen (Netherlands)	2–1	(Germany) Böckermann – Flüggen	Copacabana Stadium, Rio de Janeiro; Attendance: 8,593; Referees: José Padron (ESP), Elzir De Oliveira (BRA)
8 August 2016; 18:30	(21–19, 17–21, 16–14); Report			Copacabana Stadium, Rio de Janeiro; Attendance: 8,593; Referees: José Padron (ESP), Elzir De Oliveira (BRA)

10 August 2016; 16:30	Brouwer – Meeuwsen (Netherlands)	2–0	(Poland) Kantor – Łosiak	Copacabana Stadium, Rio de Janeiro; Attendance: 6,531; Referees: Daniel Apol (USA), Juan Saavedra (COL)
10 August 2016; 16:30	(21–19, 21–19); Report			Copacabana Stadium, Rio de Janeiro; Attendance: 6,531; Referees: Daniel Apol (USA), Juan Saavedra (COL)

10 August 2016; 23:00	Böckermann – Flüggen (Germany)	0–2	(Russia) Barsouk – Liamin	Copacabana Stadium, Rio de Janeiro; Attendance: 4,246; Referees: Wang Lijun (CHN), Charalampos Papadogoulas (GRE)
10 August 2016; 23:00	(14–21, 17–21); Report			Copacabana Stadium, Rio de Janeiro; Attendance: 4,246; Referees: Wang Lijun (CHN), Charalampos Papadogoulas (GRE)

=== Pool C ===
Pos	Team	Pld	W	L	Pts	SW	SL	SR	SPW	SPL	SPR	Qualification
1	Dalhausser – Lucena (USA)	3	3	0	6	6	1	6.000	146	107	1.364	Round of 16
2	Ontiveros – Virgen (MEX)	3	2	1	5	4	3	1.333	123	108	1.139	Round of 16
3	Lupo – Nicolai (ITA)	3	1	2	4	4	4	1.000	144	142	1.014	Lucky losers
4	Belhaj – Naceur (TUN)	3	0	3	3	0	6	0.000	70	126	0.556	

Source: FIVB

7 August 2016; 12:00	Lupo – Nicolai (Italy)	1–2	(Mexico) Ontiveros – Virgen	Copacabana Stadium, Rio de Janeiro; Attendance: 8,433; Referees: Juan Saavedra (COL), Mariko Satomi (JPN)
7 August 2016; 12:00	(21–14, 14–21, 11–15); Report			Copacabana Stadium, Rio de Janeiro; Attendance: 8,433; Referees: Juan Saavedra (COL), Mariko Satomi (JPN)

7 August 2016; 16:30	Dalhausser – Lucena (United States)	2–0	(Tunisia) Belhaj – Naceur	Copacabana Stadium, Rio de Janeiro; Attendance: 8,924; Referees: Wang Lijun (CHN), Jonas Personeni (SUI)
7 August 2016; 16:30	(21–7, 21–13); Report			Copacabana Stadium, Rio de Janeiro; Attendance: 8,924; Referees: Wang Lijun (CHN), Jonas Personeni (SUI)

9 August 2016; 11:00	Dalhausser – Lucena (United States)	2–0	(Mexico) Ontiveros – Virgen	Copacabana Stadium, Rio de Janeiro; Attendance: 3,988; Referees: Juan Saavedra (COL), Elizir de Oliveira (BRA)
9 August 2016; 11:00	(21–14, 21–17); Report			Copacabana Stadium, Rio de Janeiro; Attendance: 3,988; Referees: Juan Saavedra (COL), Elizir de Oliveira (BRA)

9 August 2016; 22:00	Lupo – Nicolai (Italy)	2–0	(Tunisia) Belhaj – Naceur	Copacabana Stadium, Rio de Janeiro; Attendance: 6,671; Referees: Mariko Satomi (JPN), Juan Saavedra (COL)
9 August 2016; 22:00	(21–17, 21–13); Report			Copacabana Stadium, Rio de Janeiro; Attendance: 6,671; Referees: Mariko Satomi (JPN), Juan Saavedra (COL)

11 August 2016; 16:30	Dalhausser – Lucena (United States)	2–1	(Italy) Lupo – Nicolai	Copacabana Stadium, Rio de Janeiro; Attendance: 8,241; Referees: Mário Ferro (BRA), Osvaldo Sumavil (ARG)
11 August 2016; 16:30	(21–13, 17–21, 24–22); Report			Copacabana Stadium, Rio de Janeiro; Attendance: 8,241; Referees: Mário Ferro (BRA), Osvaldo Sumavil (ARG)

11 August 2016; 16:30	Ontiveros – Virgen (Mexico)	2–0	(Tunisia) Belhaj – Naceur	Copacabana Stadium Court 1, Rio de Janeiro; Referees: Giovanni Bake (RSA), Charalampos Papadogoulas (GRE)
11 August 2016; 16:30	(21–10, 21–10); Report			Copacabana Stadium Court 1, Rio de Janeiro; Referees: Giovanni Bake (RSA), Charalampos Papadogoulas (GRE)

=== Pool D ===
Pos	Team	Pld	W	L	Pts	SW	SL	SR	SPW	SPL	SPR	Qualification
1	Díaz – González (CUB)	3	3	0	6	6	2	3.000	159	142	1.120	Round of 16
2	Evandro – Pedro Solberg (BRA)	3	1	2	4	4	5	0.800	157	159	0.987	Round of 16
3	Saxton – Schalk (CAN)	3	1	2	4	3	5	0.600	138	149	0.926	Lucky losers
4	Samoilovs – Šmēdiņš (LAT)	3	1	2	4	4	5	0.800	150	164	0.915	

Source: FIVB

7 August 2016; 17:30	Evandro – Pedro Solberg (Brazil)	1–2	(Cuba) Díaz – González	Copacabana Stadium, Rio de Janeiro; Attendance: 8,540; Referees: Charalampos Papadogoulas (GRE), Osvaldo Sumavil (ARG)
7 August 2016; 17:30	(22–24, 23–21, 13–15); Report			Copacabana Stadium, Rio de Janeiro; Attendance: 8,540; Referees: Charalampos Papadogoulas (GRE), Osvaldo Sumavil (ARG)

8 August 2016; 00:00	Samoilovs – Šmēdiņš (Latvia)	2–1	(Canada) Saxton – Schalk	Copacabana Stadium, Rio de Janeiro; Attendance: 8,274; Referees: Elzir De Oliveira (BRA), Daniel Apol (USA)
8 August 2016; 00:00	(21–17, 18–21, 15–13); Report			Copacabana Stadium, Rio de Janeiro; Attendance: 8,274; Referees: Elzir De Oliveira (BRA), Daniel Apol (USA)

9 August 2016; 10:00	Evandro – Pedro Solberg (Brazil)	1–2	(Canada) Saxton – Schalk	Copacabana Stadium, Rio de Janeiro; Attendance: 3,988; Referees: Daniel Apol (USA), Mariko Satomi (JPN)
9 August 2016; 10:00	(21–17, 18–21, 14–16); Report			Copacabana Stadium, Rio de Janeiro; Attendance: 3,988; Referees: Daniel Apol (USA), Mariko Satomi (JPN)

9 August 2016; 15:30	Samoilovs – Šmēdiņš (Latvia)	1–2	(Cuba) Díaz – González	Copacabana Stadium, Rio de Janeiro; Attendance: 6,353; Referees: Roman Pristovakin (RUS), Jonas Personeni (SUI)
9 August 2016; 15:30	(21–23, 21–19. 9–15); Report			Copacabana Stadium, Rio de Janeiro; Attendance: 6,353; Referees: Roman Pristovakin (RUS), Jonas Personeni (SUI)

11 August 2016; 11:00	Saxton – Schalk (Canada)	0–2	(Cuba) Díaz – González	Copacabana Stadium, Rio de Janeiro; Attendance: 7,838; Referees: Davide Crescentini (ITA), Elzir De Oliveira (BRA)
11 August 2016; 11:00	(15–21, 18–21); Report			Copacabana Stadium, Rio de Janeiro; Attendance: 7,838; Referees: Davide Crescentini (ITA), Elzir De Oliveira (BRA)

11 August 2016; 17:30	Evandro – Pedro Solberg (Brazil)	2–1	(Latvia) Samoilovs – Šmēdiņš	Copacabana Stadium, Rio de Janeiro; Attendance: 8,722; Referees: Jonas Personeni (SUI), Wang Lijun (CHN)
11 August 2016; 17:30	(21–16, 20–22, 15–7); Report			Copacabana Stadium, Rio de Janeiro; Attendance: 8,722; Referees: Jonas Personeni (SUI), Wang Lijun (CHN)

=== Pool E ===
Pos	Team	Pld	W	L	Pts	SW	SL	SR	SPW	SPL	SPR	Qualification
1	Krasilnikov – Semenov (RUS)	3	3	0	6	6	1	6.000	134	103	1.301	Round of 16
2	Nummerdor – Varenhorst (NED)	3	2	1	5	5	3	1.667	142	126	1.127	Round of 16
3	Fijałek – Prudel (POL)	3	1	2	4	3	5	0.600	126	140	0.900	Lucky losers
4	Grimalt E. – Grimalt M. (CHI)	3	0	3	3	1	6	0.167	103	136	0.757	

Source: FIVB

7 August 2016; 13:00	Nummerdor – Varenhorst (Netherlands)	2–0	(Chile) Grimalt E. – Grimalt M.	Copacabana Stadium, Rio de Janeiro; Attendance: 8,433; Referees: Elzir De Oliveira (BRA), Kritsada Panaseri (THA)
7 August 2016; 13:00	(21–16, 21–13); Report			Copacabana Stadium, Rio de Janeiro; Attendance: 8,433; Referees: Elzir De Oliveira (BRA), Kritsada Panaseri (THA)

7 August 2016; 23:00	Krasilnikov – Semenov (Russia)	2–0	(Poland) Fijałek – Prudel	Copacabana Stadium, Rio de Janeiro; Attendance: 7,329; Referees: Davide Crescentini (ITA), Mariko Satomi (JPN)
7 August 2016; 23:00	(21–14, 21–13); Report			Copacabana Stadium, Rio de Janeiro; Attendance: 7,329; Referees: Davide Crescentini (ITA), Mariko Satomi (JPN)

9 August 2016; 17:30	Nummerdor – Varenhorst (Netherlands)	2–1	(Poland) Fijałek – Prudel	Copacabana Stadium, Rio de Janeiro; Attendance: 7,590; Referees: Jonas Personeni (SUI), Giovanni Bake (RSA)
9 August 2016; 17:30	(21–17, 19–21, 15–9); Report			Copacabana Stadium, Rio de Janeiro; Attendance: 7,590; Referees: Jonas Personeni (SUI), Giovanni Bake (RSA)

9 August 2016; 23:00	Krasilnikov – Semenov (Russia)	2–0	(Chile) Grimalt E. – Grimalt M.	Copacabana Stadium, Rio de Janeiro; Attendance: 6,875; Referees: José Padron (ESP), Carlos Rodríguez (PUR)
9 August 2016; 23:00	(21–17, 21–14); Report			Copacabana Stadium, Rio de Janeiro; Attendance: 6,875; Referees: José Padron (ESP), Carlos Rodríguez (PUR)

11 August 2016; 12:00	Fijałek – Prudel (Poland)	2–1	(Chile) Grimalt E. – Grimalt M.	Copacabana Stadium, Rio de Janeiro; Attendance: 7,838; Referees: Juan Saavedra (COL), José Padron (ESP)
11 August 2016; 12:00	(21–13, 16–21, 15–9); Report			Copacabana Stadium, Rio de Janeiro; Attendance: 7,838; Referees: Juan Saavedra (COL), José Padron (ESP)

11 August 2016; 13:00	Nummerdor – Varenhorst (Netherlands)	1–2	(Russia) Krasilnikov – Semenov	Copacabana Stadium, Rio de Janeiro; Attendance: 7,838; Referees: Daniel Apol (USA), Kritsada Panaseri (THA)
11 August 2016; 13:00	(15–21, 21–14, 9–15); Report			Copacabana Stadium, Rio de Janeiro; Attendance: 7,838; Referees: Daniel Apol (USA), Kritsada Panaseri (THA)

=== Pool F ===
Pos	Team	Pld	W	L	Pts	SW	SL	SR	SPW	SPL	SPR	Qualification
1	Gavira – Herrera (ESP)	3	2	1	5	5	4	1.250	153	147	1.041	Round of 16
2	Cherif – Jefferson (QAT)	3	2	1	5	4	4	1.000	135	145	0.931	Round of 16
3	Huber – Seidl (AUT)	3	1	2	4	4	4	1.000	145	140	1.036	Round of 16
4	Gibb – Patterson (USA)	3	1	2	4	3	4	0.750	125	126	0.992	

Source: FIVB

6 August 2016; 16:30	Gibb – Patterson (United States)	2–0	(Qatar) Cherif – Jefferson	Copacabana Stadium, Rio de Janeiro; Referees: Davide Crescentini (ITA), Kritsada Panaseri (THA)
6 August 2016; 16:30	(21–16, 21–16); Report			Copacabana Stadium, Rio de Janeiro; Referees: Davide Crescentini (ITA), Kritsada Panaseri (THA)

6 August 2016; 22:00	Gavira – Herrera (Spain)	2–1	(Austria) Huber – Seidl	Copacabana Stadium, Rio de Janeiro; Attendance: 3,135; Referees: Jonas Personeni (SUI), Roman Pristovakin (RUS)
6 August 2016; 22:00	(14–21, 21–17, 15–13); Report			Copacabana Stadium, Rio de Janeiro; Attendance: 3,135; Referees: Jonas Personeni (SUI), Roman Pristovakin (RUS)

8 August 2016; 13:00	Gavira – Herrera (Spain)	1–2	(Qatar) Cherif – Jefferson	Copacabana Stadium, Rio de Janeiro; Referees: Roman Pristovakin (RUS), Lucie Guillemette (CAN)
8 August 2016; 13:00	(21–13, 18–21, 12–15); Report			Copacabana Stadium, Rio de Janeiro; Referees: Roman Pristovakin (RUS), Lucie Guillemette (CAN)

8 August 2016; 16:30	Gibb – Patterson (United States)	0–2	(Austria) Huber – Seidl	Copacabana Stadium, Rio de Janeiro; Attendance: 8,593; Referees: Elzir De Oliveira (BRA), José Padron (ESP)
8 August 2016; 16:30	(18–21, 18–21); Report			Copacabana Stadium, Rio de Janeiro; Attendance: 8,593; Referees: Elzir De Oliveira (BRA), José Padron (ESP)

10 August 2016; 11:00	Gibb – Patterson (United States)	1–2	(Spain) Gavira – Herrera	Copacabana Stadium, Rio de Janeiro; Attendance: 7,245; Referees: Wang Lijun (CHN), Giovanni Bake (RSA)
10 August 2016; 11:00	(19–21, 21–16, 7–15); Report			Copacabana Stadium, Rio de Janeiro; Attendance: 7,245; Referees: Wang Lijun (CHN), Giovanni Bake (RSA)

10 August 2016; 12:00	Huber – Seidl (Austria)	1–2	(Qatar) Cherif – Jefferson	Copacabana Stadium, Rio de Janeiro; Attendance: 7,245; Referees: Charalampos Papadogoulas (GRE), Jonas Personeni (SUI)
10 August 2016; 12:00	(21–18, 19–21, 12–15); Report			Copacabana Stadium, Rio de Janeiro; Attendance: 7,245; Referees: Charalampos Papadogoulas (GRE), Jonas Personeni (SUI)

=== Lucky losers ===
The table below shows the ranking of third-placed teams in the preliminary round. The top two teams will advance to next round automatically. The other teams will compete for the two remaining spots. The third-ranked team will play with the sixth-ranked team, and the fourth-ranked team will play with the fifth-ranked team.

Pos	Team	Pld	W	L	Pts	SW	SL	SR	SPW	SPL	SPR	Qualification
1	Doppler – Horst (AUT)	3	2	1	5	5	2	2.500	133	145	0.917	Round of 16
2	Huber – Seidl (AUT)	3	1	2	4	4	4	1.000	145	140	1.036	Round of 16
3	Lupo – Nicolai (ITA)	3	1	2	4	4	4	1.000	144	142	1.014	Lucky loser playoffs
4	Saxton – Schalk (CAN)	3	1	2	4	3	5	0.600	138	149	0.926	Lucky loser playoffs
5	Fijałek – Prudel (POL)	3	1	2	4	3	5	0.600	126	140	0.900	Lucky loser playoffs
6	Kantor – Łosiak (POL)	3	1	2	4	2	4	0.500	113	116	0.974	Lucky loser playoffs

Source: FIVB

==== Lucky loser playoffs ====
11 August 2016; 23:00	Lupo – Nicolai (Italy)	2–1	(Poland) Kantor – Łosiak	Copacabana Stadium Court 1, Rio de Janeiro; Referees: Charalampos Papadogoulas (GRE), Wang Lijun (CHN)
11 August 2016; 23:00	(21–12, 15–21, 15–13); Report			Copacabana Stadium Court 1, Rio de Janeiro; Referees: Charalampos Papadogoulas (GRE), Wang Lijun (CHN)

11 August 2016; 23:00	Saxton – Schalk (Canada)	2–0	(Poland) Fijałek – Prudel	Copacabana Stadium, Rio de Janeiro; Attendance: 7,741; Referees: Juan Saavedra (COL), Davide Crescentini (ITA)
11 August 2016; 23:00	(21–19. 21–18); Report			Copacabana Stadium, Rio de Janeiro; Attendance: 7,741; Referees: Juan Saavedra (COL), Davide Crescentini (ITA)

== Knockout stage ==
The round of sixteen pair up weer determined by drawing of lots. The six first ranked teams in preliminary pools were separated automatically. Then, the lucky loser playoffs winners were drawn. The two best third ranked were drawn next. And, the last drawing belonged to the second ranked teams. The teams in the same pool from preliminary round could not meet in round of 16.

Round of 16
12 August
Carambula – Ranghieri (ITA)	0
Lupo – Nicolai (ITA)	2
13 August
Evandro – Pedro Solberg (BRA)	1
Barsouk – Liamin (RUS)	2
12 August
Krasilnikov – Semenov (RUS)	2
Cherif – Jefferson (QAT)	0
12 August
Doppler – Horst (AUT)	0
Díaz – González (CUB)	2
13 August
Dalhausser – Lucena (USA)	2
Huber – Seidl (AUT)	0
13 August
Alison – Bruno Schmidt (BRA)	2
Gavira – Herrera (ESP)	0
12 August
Ontiveros – Virgen (MEX)	0
Nummerdor – Varenhorst (NED)	2
13 August
Saxton – Schalk (CAN)	0
Brouwer – Meeuwsen (NED)	2

Quarter-finals
15 August
Lupo – Nicolai (ITA)	2
Barsouk – Liamin (RUS)	1
15 August
Krasilnikov – Semenov (RUS)	2
Díaz – González (CUB)	1
15 August
Dalhausser – Lucena (USA)	1
Alison – Bruno Schmidt (BRA)	2
15 August
Nummerdor – Varenhorst (NED)	0
Brouwer – Meeuwsen (NED)	2

Semi-finals
16 August
Lupo – Nicolai (ITA)	2
Krasilnikov – Semenov (RUS)	1
16 August
Alison – Bruno Schmidt (BRA)	2
Brouwer – Meeuwsen (NED)	1

Gold medal
18 August
Lupo – Nicolai (ITA)	0
Alison – Bruno Schmidt (BRA)	2
Bronze medal
18 August
Krasilnikov – Semenov (RUS)	0
Brouwer – Meeuwsen (NED)	2

=== Round of 16 ===
12 August 2016; 12:00	Krasilnikov – Semenov (Russia)	2–0	(Qatar) Cherif – Jefferson	Copacabana Stadium, Rio de Janeiro; Attendance: 7,237; Referees: Wang Lijun (CHN), Charalampos Papadogoulas (GRE)
12 August 2016; 12:00	(21–13, 21–13); Report			Copacabana Stadium, Rio de Janeiro; Attendance: 7,237; Referees: Wang Lijun (CHN), Charalampos Papadogoulas (GRE)

12 August 2016; 15:00	Doppler – Horst (Austria)	0–2	(Cuba) Díaz – González	Copacabana Stadium, Rio de Janeiro; Attendance: 5,756; Referees: Daniel Apol (USA), Jonas Personeni (SUI)
12 August 2016; 15:00	(17–21, 14–21); Report			Copacabana Stadium, Rio de Janeiro; Attendance: 5,756; Referees: Daniel Apol (USA), Jonas Personeni (SUI)

12 August 2016; 20:00	Ontiveros – Virgen (Mexico)	0–2	(Netherlands) Nummerdor – Varenhorst	Copacabana Stadium, Rio de Janeiro; Attendance: 7,878; Referees: Roman Pristovakin (RUS), José Padron (ESP)
12 August 2016; 20:00	(18–21, 15–21); Report			Copacabana Stadium, Rio de Janeiro; Attendance: 7,878; Referees: Roman Pristovakin (RUS), José Padron (ESP)

12 August 2016; 23:00	Carambula – Ranghieri (Italy)	0–2	(Italy) Lupo – Nicolai	Copacabana Stadium, Rio de Janeiro; Attendance: 5,247; Referees: Mário Ferro (BRA), Juan Saavedra (COL)
12 August 2016; 23:00	(12–21, 21–23); Report			Copacabana Stadium, Rio de Janeiro; Attendance: 5,247; Referees: Mário Ferro (BRA), Juan Saavedra (COL)

13 August 2016; 11:00	Alison – Bruno Schmidt (Brazil)	2–0	(Spain) Gavira – Herrera	Copacabana Stadium, Rio de Janeiro; Attendance: 5,989; Referees: Charalampos Papadogoulas (GRE), Wang Lijun (CHN)
13 August 2016; 11:00	(24–22, 21–13); Report			Copacabana Stadium, Rio de Janeiro; Attendance: 5,989; Referees: Charalampos Papadogoulas (GRE), Wang Lijun (CHN)

13 August 2016; 16:00	Evandro – Pedro Solberg (Brazil)	1–2	(Russia) Barsouk – Liamin	Copacabana Stadium, Rio de Janeiro; Attendance: 8,778; Referees: Juan Saavedra (COL), Roman Pristovakin (RUS)
13 August 2016; 16:00	(21–16, 14–21, 10–15); Report			Copacabana Stadium, Rio de Janeiro; Attendance: 8,778; Referees: Juan Saavedra (COL), Roman Pristovakin (RUS)

13 August 2016; 19:00	Saxton – Schalk (Canada)	0–2	(Netherlands) Brouwer – Meeuwsen	Copacabana Stadium, Rio de Janeiro; Attendance: 6,449; Referees: Jonas Personeni (SUI), Davide Crescentini (ITA)
13 August 2016; 19:00	(12–21, 15–21); Report			Copacabana Stadium, Rio de Janeiro; Attendance: 6,449; Referees: Jonas Personeni (SUI), Davide Crescentini (ITA)

13 August 2016; 23:59	Dalhausser – Lucena (United States)	2–0	(Austria) Huber – Seidl	Copacabana Stadium, Rio de Janeiro; Attendance: 8,180; Referees: José Padron (ESP), Kritsada Panaseri (THA)
13 August 2016; 23:59	(21–14, 21–15); Report			Copacabana Stadium, Rio de Janeiro; Attendance: 8,180; Referees: José Padron (ESP), Kritsada Panaseri (THA)

=== Quarterfinals ===
15 August 2016; 16:00	Dalhausser – Lucena (United States)	1–2	(Brazil) Alison – Bruno Schmidt	Copacabana Stadium, Rio de Janeiro; Attendance: 8,256; Referees: Jonas Personeni (SUI), Mariko Satomi (JPN)
15 August 2016; 16:00	(14–21, 21–12, 9–15); Report			Copacabana Stadium, Rio de Janeiro; Attendance: 8,256; Referees: Jonas Personeni (SUI), Mariko Satomi (JPN)

15 August 2016; 17:00	Nummerdor – Varenhorst (Netherlands)	0–2	(Netherlands) Brouwer – Meeuwsen	Copacabana Stadium, Rio de Janeiro; Referees: José Padron (ESP), Roman Pristovakin (RUS)
15 August 2016; 17:00	(23–25, 17–21); Report			Copacabana Stadium, Rio de Janeiro; Referees: José Padron (ESP), Roman Pristovakin (RUS)

15 August 2016; 23:00	Lupo – Nicolai (Italy)	2–1	(Russia) Barsouk – Liamin	Copacabana Stadium, Rio de Janeiro; Attendance: 3,318; Referees: Daniel Apol (USA), Elzir De Oliveira (BRA)
15 August 2016; 23:00	(21–18, 20–22, 15–11); Report			Copacabana Stadium, Rio de Janeiro; Attendance: 3,318; Referees: Daniel Apol (USA), Elzir De Oliveira (BRA)

15 August 2016; 23:59	Krasilnikov – Semenov (Russia)	2–1	(Cuba) Díaz – González	Copacabana Stadium, Rio de Janeiro; Attendance: 7,042; Referees: Charalampos Papadogoulas (GRE), Mário Ferro (BRA)
15 August 2016; 23:59	(22–20, 22–24, 18–16); Report			Copacabana Stadium, Rio de Janeiro; Attendance: 7,042; Referees: Charalampos Papadogoulas (GRE), Mário Ferro (BRA)

=== Semifinals ===
16 August 2016; 17:00	Alison – Bruno Schmidt (Brazil)	2–1	(Netherlands) Brouwer – Meeuwsen	Copacabana Stadium, Rio de Janeiro; Referees: Charalampos Papadogoulas (GRE), Roman Pristovakin (RUS)
16 August 2016; 17:00	(21–17, 21–23, 16–14); Report			Copacabana Stadium, Rio de Janeiro; Referees: Charalampos Papadogoulas (GRE), Roman Pristovakin (RUS)

16 August 2016; 23:00	Lupo – Nicolai (Italy)	2–1	(Russia) Krasilnikov – Semenov	Copacabana Stadium, Rio de Janeiro; Referees: Mário Ferro (BRA), Elizir de Oliveira (BRA)
16 August 2016; 23:00	(15–21, 21–16, 15–13); Report			Copacabana Stadium, Rio de Janeiro; Referees: Mário Ferro (BRA), Elizir de Oliveira (BRA)

=== Bronze medal game ===
18 August 2016; 22:00	Brouwer – Meeuwsen (Netherlands)	2–0	(Russia) Krasilnikov – Semenov	Copacabana Stadium, Rio de Janeiro; Attendance: 3,622; Referees: Elizir de Oliveira (BRA), Davide Crescentini (ITA)
18 August 2016; 22:00	(23–21, 22–20); Report			Copacabana Stadium, Rio de Janeiro; Attendance: 3,622; Referees: Elizir de Oliveira (BRA), Davide Crescentini (ITA)

=== Gold medal game ===
18 August 2016; 23:59	Alison – Bruno Schmidt (Brazil)	2–0	(Italy) Lupo – Nicolai	Copacabana Stadium, Rio de Janeiro; Attendance: 8,199; Referees: Jonas Personeni (SUI), Daniel Apol (USA)
18 August 2016; 23:59	(21–19, 21–17); Report			Copacabana Stadium, Rio de Janeiro; Attendance: 8,199; Referees: Jonas Personeni (SUI), Daniel Apol (USA)

== Final ranking ==
Rank	Team	Seed
1st place, gold medalist(s)	Alison – Bruno Schmidt (BRA)	1
2nd place, silver medalist(s)	Lupo – Nicolai (ITA)	10
3rd place, bronze medalist(s)	Brouwer – Meeuwsen (NED)	2
4	Krasilnikov – Semenov (RUS)	9
5	Dalhausser – Lucena (USA)	3
5	Nummerdor – Varenhorst (NED)	5
5	Barsouk – Liamin (RUS)	9
5	Díaz – González (CUB)	24
9	Evandro – Pedro Solberg (BRA)	4
9	Gavira – Herrera (ESP)	7
9	Carambula – Ranghieri (ITA)	12
9	Doppler – Horst (AUT)	13
9	Ontiveros – Virgen (MEX)	15
9	Saxton – Schalk (CAN)	16
9	Huber – Seidl (AUT)	18
9	Cherif – Jefferson (QAT)	19
17	Kantor – Łosiak (POL)	11
17	Fijałek – Prudel (POL)	16
19	Gibb – Patterson (USA)	6
19	Samoilovs – Šmēdiņš (LAT)	9
19	Böckermann – Flüggen (GER)	14
19	Grimalt E. – Grimalt M. (CHI)	20
19	Belhaj – Naceur (TUN)	22
19	Binstock – Schachter (CAN)	24

== See also ==
- Beach volleyball at the 2016 Summer Olympics – Women's tournament
