= Volleyball at the 2019 African Games =

- Venue: Salle Bouazaoui (indoor volleyball); Salé Beach (beach volleyball)
- Location: Salé, Morocco
- Dates: 16 – 21 August (beach volleyball); 22 – 31 August (volleyball)

Volleyball and beach volleyball at the 2019 African Games were held from 16 to 31 August 2019 in Salé, Morocco.

Indoor volleyball was held from 22 to 31 August and beach volleyball was held from 16 to 21 August.

The beach volleyball event served as a qualifier for the 2020 Summer Olympics in Tokyo, Japan.

== Participating nations ==
- Algeria
- Botswana
- Cameroon
- Cape Verde
- Egypt
- Ghana
- Kenya
- Mauritius
- Morocco
- Mozambique
- Namibia
- Nigeria
- Rwanda
- Senegal
- South Africa

== Medal table ==
=== Indoor volleyball ===
Event	Gold	Silver	Bronze
Men	Cameroon	Algeria	Egypt
Women	Kenya	Cameroon	Morocco

=== Beach volleyball ===
Event	Gold	Silver	Bronze
Men	The Gambia	Morocco	Rwanda
Women	Egypt	Kenya	Mozambique

== Results ==
=== Beach Men Tournament ===
==== Pool A ====
Pos	Team	Pld	W	L	Pts	SW	SL	SR	SPW	SPL	SPR
1	(The Gambia) Jawo–Jarra	3	2	1	5	5	3	1.667	148	143	1.035
2	(Morocco) Abicha–Elgraoui	3	2	1	5	5	2	2.500	143	120	1.192
3	(Tunisia) Naceur–Belhaj	3	2	1	5	4	3	1.333	121	121	1.000
4	(Libya) Almarrug–Abu Lababa	3	0	3	3	0	6	0.000	106	134	0.791

Date	Time		Score		Set 1	Set 2	Set 3	Total	Report
16 Aug		Jawo–Jarra (The Gambia)	1–2	(Tunisia) Naceur–Belhaj	21–8	15–21	6–15	42–44	Report
16 Aug		Abicha–Elgraoui (Morocco)	2–0	(Libya) Almarrug–Abu Lababa	21–14	21–15		42–29	Report
17 Aug		Abicha–Elgraoui (Morocco)	2–0	(Tunisia) Naceur–Belhaj	21–15	21–16		42–31	Report
17 Aug		Jawo–Jarra (The Gambia)	2–0	(Libya) Almarrug–Abu Lababa	25–23	21–17		46–40	Report
16 Aug		Abicha–Elgraoui (Morocco)	1–2	(The Gambia) Jawo–Jarra	21–18	20–22	18–20	59–60	Report
16 Aug		Naceur–Belhaj (Tunisia)	2–0	(Libya) Almarrug–Abu Lababa	25–23	21–14		46–37	Report

==== Pool B ====
Pos	Team	Pld	W	L	Pts	SW	SL	SR	SPW	SPL	SPR
1	(Mozambique) Nguvo–Soares	3	3	0	6	6	1	6.000	142	104	1.365
2	(Nigeria) Godwin–Anyasodike	3	2	1	5	5	3	1.667	138	143	0.965
3	(Mauritius) Alfred–Doorbraz	3	1	2	4	2	5	0.400	120	139	0.863
4	(Egypt) Metwaly–Galal	3	0	3	3	1	6	0.167	129	145	0.890

Date	Time		Score		Set 1	Set 2	Set 3	Total	Report
16 Aug		Alfred–Doorbraz (Mauritius)	0–2	(Nigeria) Godwin–Anyasodike	16–21	23–25		39–46	Report
16 Aug		Nguvo–Soares (Mozambique)	2–0	(Egypt) Metwaly–Galal	21–19	21–13		42–32	Report
17 Aug		Nguvo–Soares (Mozambique)	2–1	(Nigeria) Godwin–Anyasodike	21–16	19–21	15–8	55–45	Report
17 Aug		Alfred–Doorbraz (Mauritius)	2–1	(Egypt) Metwaly–Galal	18–21	21–14	15–13	54–48	Report
16 Aug		Nguvo–Soares (Mozambique)	2–0	(Mauritius) Alfred–Doorbraz	24–22	21–5		45–27	Report
17 Aug		Godwin–Anyasodike (Nigeria)	2–1	(Egypt) Metwaly–Galal	21–15	13–21	15–13	49–49	Report

==== Pool C ====
Pos	Team	Pld	W	L	Pts	SW	SL	SR	SPW	SPL	SPR
1	(Rwanda) Ntagengwa–Kavalo	3	3	0	6	6	1	6.000	140	107	1.308
2	(Angola) Sequeira–Figueiredo	3	2	1	5	5	3	1.667	162	137	1.182
3	(Algeria) Farouk–Mohamed-Islem	3	1	2	4	3	4	0.750	128	149	0.859
4	(Benin) Tamou–Tohouegnon	3	0	3	3	0	6	0.000	93	130	0.715

Date	Time		Score		Set 1	Set 2	Set 3	Total	Report
16 Aug		Ntagengwa–Kavalo (Rwanda)	2–0	(Algeria) Farouk–Mohamed-Islem	21–13	21–12		42–25	Report
16 Aug		Sequeira–Figueiredo (Angola)	2–0	(Benin) Tamou–Tohouegnon	21–13	21–11		42–24	Report
17 Aug		Sequeira–Figueiredo (Angola)	2–1	(Algeria) Farouk–Mohamed-Islem	23–25	21–13	21–19	65–57	Report
17 Aug		Ntagengwa–Kavalo (Rwanda)	2–0	(Benin) Tamou–Tohouegnon	21–12	21–15		42–27	Report
17 Aug		Sequeira–Figueiredo (Angola)	1–2	(Rwanda) Ntagengwa–Kavalo	20–22	21–18	14–16	55–56	Report
16 Aug		Farouk–Mohamed-Islem (Algeria)	2–0	(Benin) Tamou–Tohouegnon	25–23	21–19		46–42	Report

==== Pool D ====
Pos	Team	Pld	W	L	Pts	SW	SL	SR	SPW	SPL	SPR
1	(South Africa) Goldschmidt–Williams	3	3	0	6	6	0	MAX	126	61	2.066
2	(Ghana) Carboo–Essilfie	3	2	1	5	4	2	2.000	103	94	1.096
3	(Sudan) Toto–Nagi	3	1	2	4	2	4	0.500	82	84	0.976
4	(Sierra Leone) Bangura–Kamara	3	0	3	3	0	6	0.000	54	126	0.429

Date	Time		Score		Set 1	Set 2	Set 3	Total	Report
16 Aug		Carboo–Essilfie (Ghana)	0–2	(South Africa) Goldschmidt–Williams	9–21	10–21		19–42	Report
16 Aug		Bangura–Kamara (Sierra Leone)	0–2 Forfeit of team A	(Sudan) Toto–Nagi	0–21	0–21		0–42	Report
17 Aug		Bangura–Kamara (Sierra Leone)	0–2	(South Africa) Goldschmidt–Williams	16–21	8–21		24–42	Report
17 Aug		Carboo–Essilfie (Ghana)	2–0	(Sudan) Toto–Nagi	21–12	21–10		42–22	Report
17 Aug		Bangura–Kamara (Sierra Leone)	0–2	(Ghana) Carboo–Essilfie	12–21	18–21		30–42	Report
17 Aug		Goldschmidt–Williams (South Africa)	2–0	(Sudan) Toto–Nagi	21–11	21–7		42–18	Report

=== Semifinals ===
Date	Time		Score		Set 1	Set 2	Set 3	Total	Report
18 Aug	9:00	Almarrug–Abu Lababa (Libya)	2–1	(Sierra Leone) Bangura–Kamara	17–21	21–18	15–10	53–49	Report
18 Aug	Follow	Metwaly–Galal (Egypt)	2–0	(Benin) Tamou–Tohouegnon	21–15	21–13		42–28	Report

=== Semifinals ===
Date	Time		Score		Set 1	Set 2	Set 3	Total	Report
18 Aug	Follow	Naceur–Belhaj (Tunisia)	2–0	(Sudan) Toto–Nagi	21–8	21–18		42–26	Report
18 Aug	Follow	Alfred–Doorbraz (Mauritius)	2–0	(Algeria) Farouk–Mohamed-Islem	21–16	21–19		42–35	Report
