= Evandro Oliveira =

Brazilian beach volleyball player (born 1990)

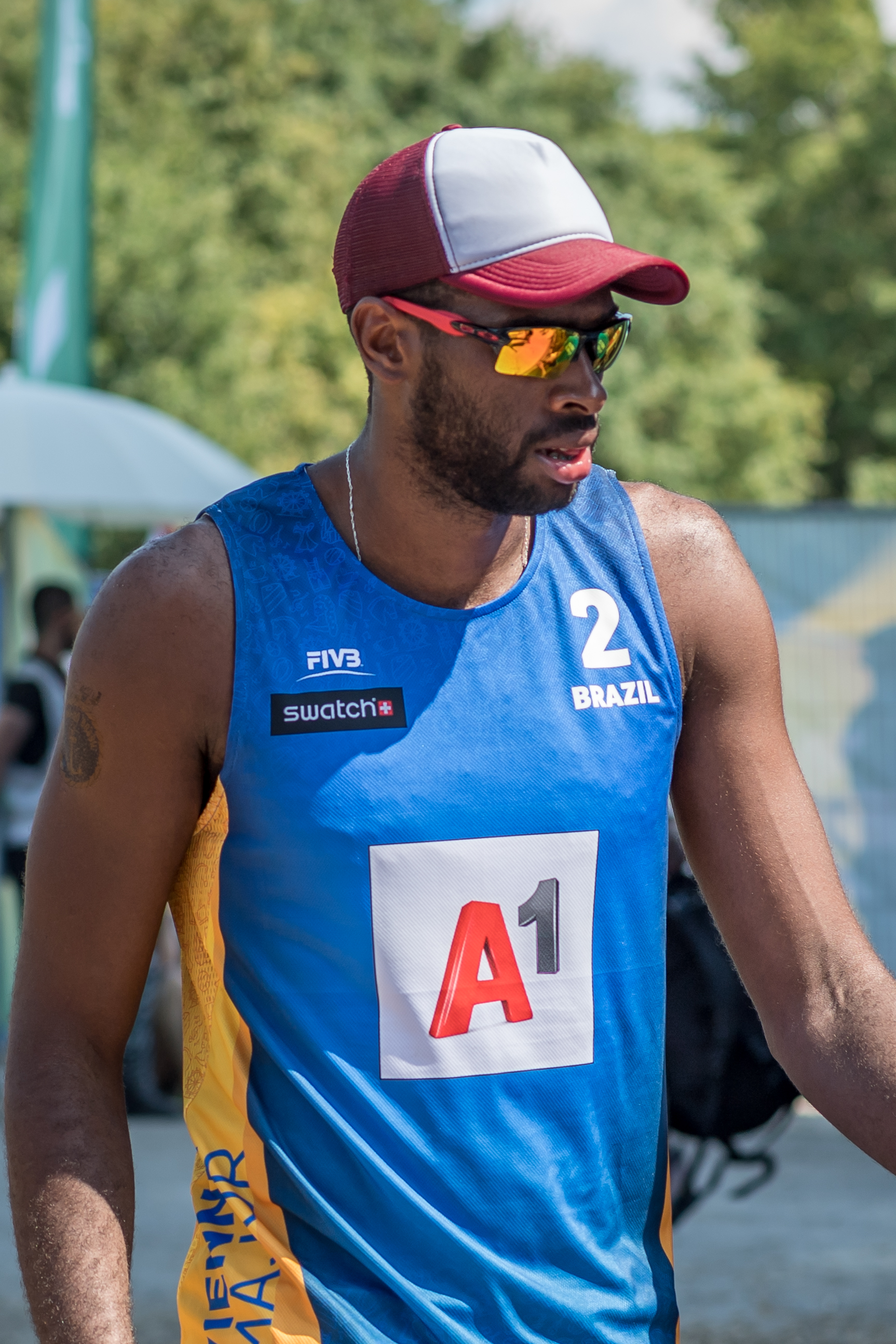
- Oliveira in 2018

Personal information
- Full name: Evandro Gonçalves de Oliveira Junior
- Born: 17 July 1990 (age 36) Rio de Janeiro, Brazil
- Height: 2.11 m (6 ft 11 in)

Sport
- Sport: Beach volleyball
Medal record
Men's beach volleyball
Representing Brazil
World Championships
Gold medal – first place	2017 Vienna	Beach
Bronze medal – third place	2015 The Hague	Beach
South American Games
Gold medal – first place	2026 Santa Fe	Beach

Evandro Gonçalves de Oliveira Junior (born 17 July 1990) is a Brazilian beach volleyball player. He represented Brazil at three editions – 2016, 2020 and 2024 – of the Summer Olympics, partnering with Pedro Solberg, Bruno Oscar Schmidt and Arthur Lanci, respectively.

== Professional career ==
Playing alongside Pedro Solberg, Oliveira reached his first podium at the FIVB World Championships – third place at the 2015 edition in Netherlands.

The following year, Oliveira made his Olympics debut at the 2016 edition in Rio de Janeiro, Brazil. Playing again with Solberg, the Brazilian pair reached the round of 16.

In August 2017, Oliveira became world champion with his new partner André Stein, at the 2017 edition in Vienna, Austria.

Sporting positions
Preceded by Aleksandrs Samoilovs and Jānis Šmēdiņš (LAT)	Men's FIVB Beach Volley World Tour Winner alongside (Brazil) André Stein; 2017	Succeeded by Anders Mol and Christian Sørum (NOR)
Awards
Preceded by Phil Dalhausser (USA)	Men's FIVB World Tour "Best Server"; 2015–	Succeeded by Incumbent
Preceded by Aleksandrs Samoilovs and Jānis Šmēdiņš (LAT)	Men's FIVB World Tour "Team of the Year" alongside (Brazil) André Stein; 2017	Succeeded by Anders Mol and Christian Sørum (NOR)
