= Nivaldo Díaz =

Cuban beach volleyball player (born 1994)

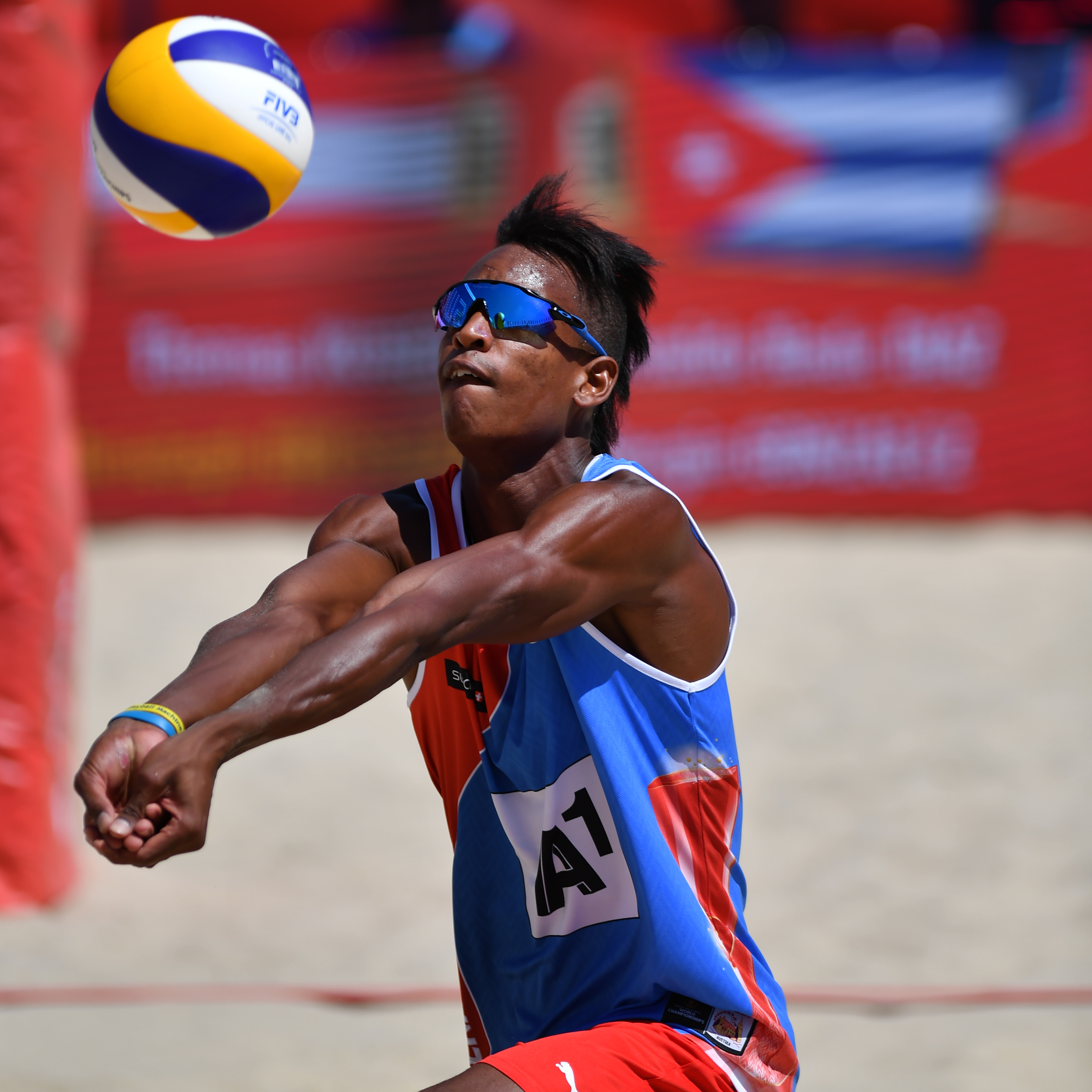
- Díaz at the 2017 Beach Volleyball World Championships

Personal information
- Full name: Nivaldo Nadhir Díaz Gómez
- Nationality: Cuban
- Born: 24 March 1994 (age 32) Havana, Cuba
- Height: 6 ft 8 in (203 cm)

Sport
- Sport: Beach volleyball
Medal record
Representing Cuba
Pan American Games
Bronze medal – third place	2015 Toronto	Men's

Nivaldo Nadhir Díaz Gómez (Note: In this Spanish name, the first or paternal surname is Díaz and the second or maternal family name is Gómez.) (born 24 March 1994) is a Cuban beach volleyball player.

Díaz competed at the 2016 Summer Olympics in Rio de Janeiro in the men's beach volleyball tournament.
