= Clemens Doppler =

Austrian beach volleyball player (born 1980)

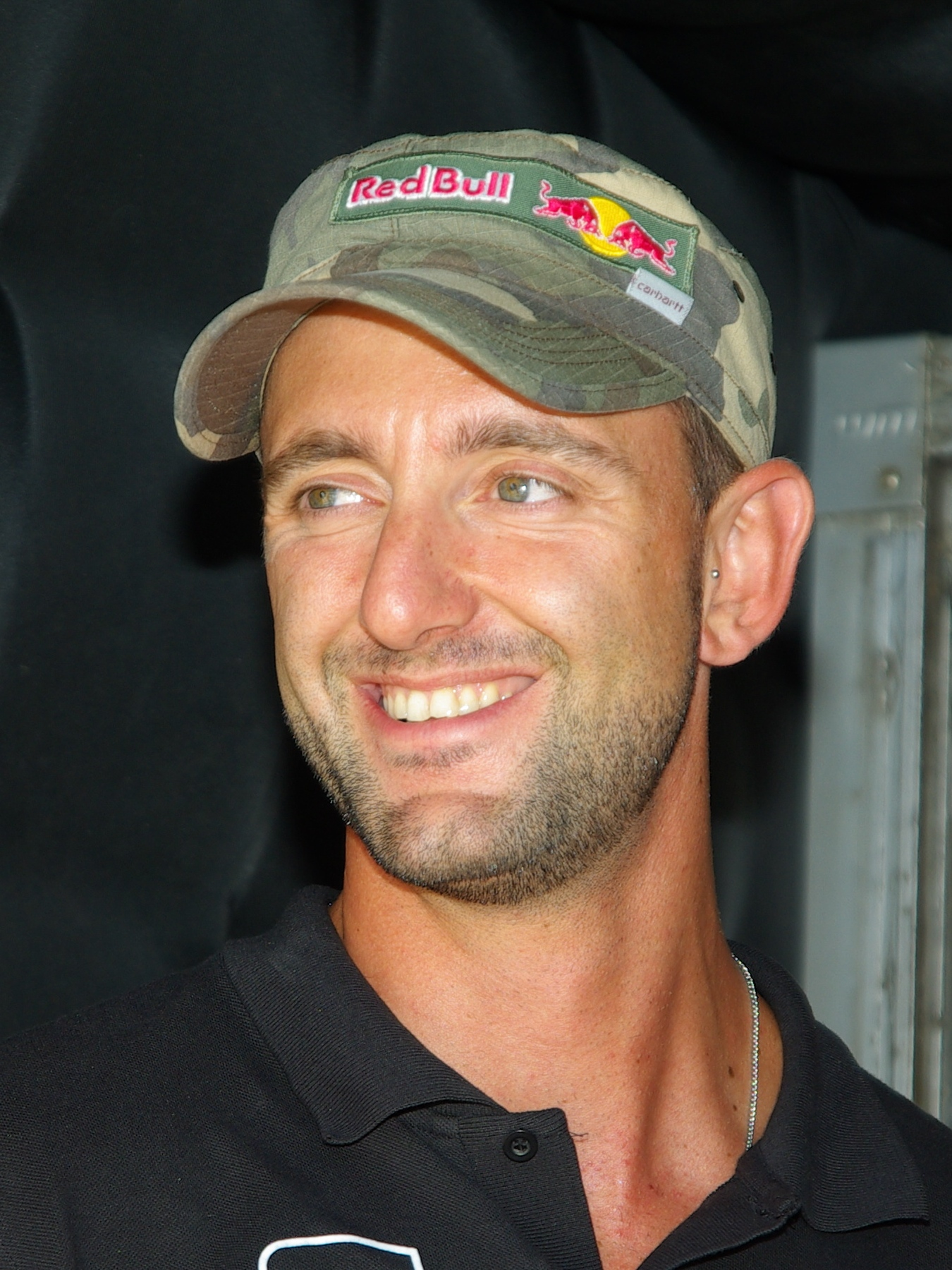

Personal information
- Nationality: (Austria) Austrian
- Born: 6 September 1980 (age 46)
- Height: 200 cm (6 ft 7 in)

Sport
- Sport: Beach volleyball
Medal record
Men's beach volleyball
Representing Austria
World Championships
Silver medal – second place	2017 Vienna	Beach
European Championships
Gold medal – first place	2003 Alanya	Beach
Gold medal – first place	2007 Valencia	Beach
Silver medal – second place	2010 Berlin	Beach
Bronze medal – third place	2014 Cagliari	Beach

Clemens Doppler (born 6 September 1980) is a beach volleyball player from Austria.

He and teammate Peter Gartmayer represented Austria at the 2008 Summer Olympics in Beijing, China. Although he qualified for the 2004 Summer Olympics, an injury kept him out and he was replaced by Florian Gosch.

After the 2008 Summer Olympics, Doppler played with partner Matthias Mellitzer from 2009 until the end of the end of the 2011 season. On 21 October 2011 Doppler and Mellitzer announced their split. Media and the press speculated that Doppler will team up with fellow Beach Volleyballer Alexander Horst who also announced his split with one-year partner Daniel Müllner in October 2011.

He and Horst did team up for the 2012 Summer Olympics, where they were eliminated in the preliminary round.

== Sponsors ==
- Swatch
