= Kelvin Katey Carboo =

Ghanaian beach volleyball player

Personal information
- Born: 10 March 2000 (age 26); Accra, Ghana
- Height: 184 cm (6 ft 0 in)

Kelvin Katey Carboo (born 10 March 2000) is a Ghanaian beach volleyball player.

== Life ==
Carboo hails from Accra in the Greater Accra Region of Ghana.

== Career ==
In July 2017, Carboo participated in the Commonwealth Youth Games with Eric Tsatsu as his partner and they were ranked 4th.

In July 2018, he participated in the 2018 Africa Youth Games held in Algeria. In October 2018, he again participated in the 2018 Youth Olympic Games.

In June 2019, he again participated in the 1st African Beach Games with Essilfie Samuel Tetteh as his partner and they were ranked 2nd. In August 2019, he participated in the 12th All African Games.

In January 2020, he participated in the CAVB Continental Cup held in Accra with Essilfie as his partner and they were ranked 1st.

In March 2022, he participated in the 1st African Beach Games held in Cape Verde.
