= Alexander Brouwer =

Dutch beach volleyball player (born 1989)

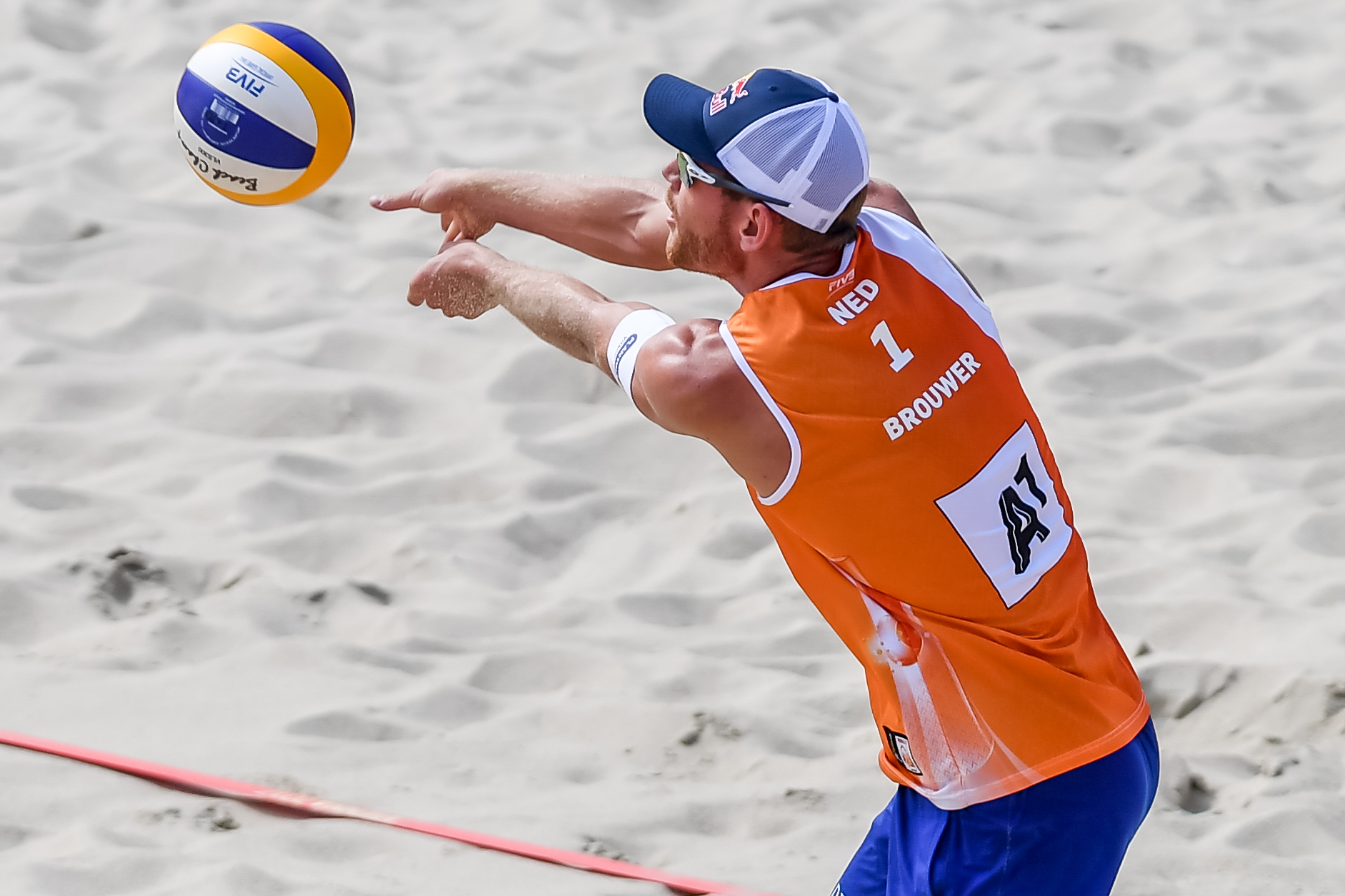

Personal information
- Nationality: Dutch
- Born: 3 November 1989 (age 36); Leiden, Netherlands
- Height: 198 cm (6 ft 6 in)
Honours
Men's beach volleyball
Representing Netherlands
Olympic Games
Bronze medal – third place	2016 Rio de Janeiro	Beach
World Championships
Gold medal – first place	2013 Stare Jabłonki	Beach

Alexander Brouwer (born 3 November 1989 in Leiden) is a Dutch male beach volleyball player. He is the 2013 World Champion alongside his teammate Robert Meeuwsen.

Awards
Preceded by Alison Cerutti (BRA)	Men's FIVB World Tour "Best Hitter"; 2017	Succeeded by Incumbent
