= Robert Meeuwsen =

Dutch beach volleyball player (born 1988)

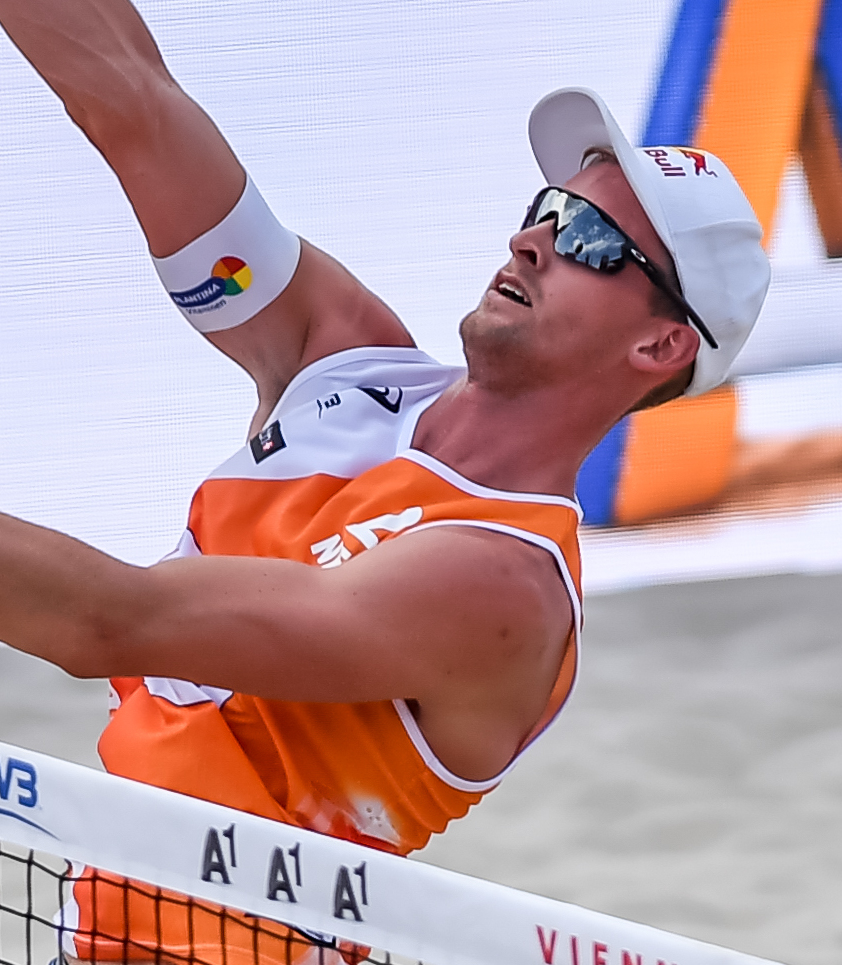

Personal information
- Nationality: Dutch
- Born: 21 March 1988 (age 38); Nieuwegein, Netherlands
- Height: 207 cm (6 ft 9 in)
Honours
Men's beach volleyball
Representing Netherlands
Olympic Games
Bronze medal – third place	2016 Rio de Janeiro	Beach
World Championships
Gold medal – first place	2013 Stare Jabłonki	Beach

Robert Meeuwsen (born 21 March 1988 in Nieuwegein) is a Dutch male beach volleyball player. He is the 2013 World Champion alongside his teammate Alexander Brouwer. He is also a beach volleyball bronze medalist from the 2016 Summer Olympics in Rio de Janeiro, Brazil.
