= Adrián Gavira =

Spanish beach volleyball player (born 1987)

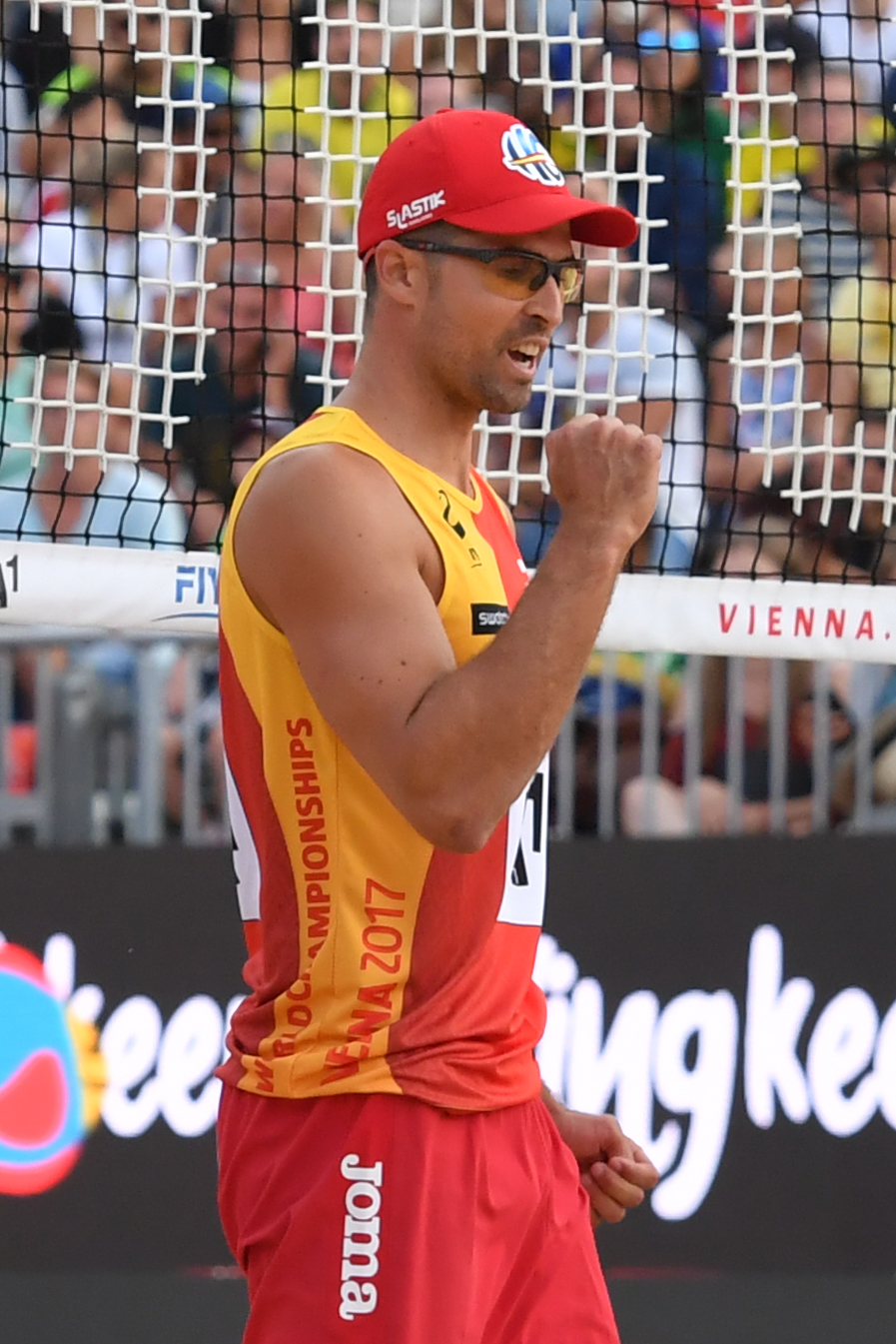
- Gavira at the 2017 Beach Volleyball World Championships

Personal information
- Full name: Adrián Gavira Collado
- Nationality: Spanish
- Born: 17 September 1987 (age 39); San Roque, Spain
- Height: 193 cm (6 ft 4 in)
Honours
Men's beach volleyball
Representing Spain
World Tour
Bronze medal – third place	2013 Berlin	Beach
European Championships
Gold medal – first place	2013 Klagenfurt	Beach

Adrián Gavira Collado (Note: In this Spanish name, the first or paternal surname is Gavira and the second or maternal family name is Collado.) (born 17 September 1987 in San Roque) is a Spanish beach volleyball player. He currently plays with Pablo Herrera. The pair participated in the 2012 Summer Olympics tournament and lost in the round of 16 to Brazilians Ricardo Santos and Pedro Cunha.

In 2016, the Gavira and Herrera partnership won one gold and one bronze on the FIVB Beach Volleyball World Tour. At the 2016 Olympics, they qualified from the pool stages, but were drawn against the Brazilian team of Alison Cerutti and Bruno Schmidt in the round of 16. The Brazilians were the number one seeds and World Champions going into the match, and beat the Spanish pair despite a tight first set.

== Notes ==
Awards
Preceded by Igor Kolodinsky (RUS)	Men's FIVB Beach World Tour "Top Rookie"; 2008	Succeeded by Ruslans Sorokins (LAT)
