= Copacabana Stadium =

Former stadium in Rio de Janeiro, Brazil

Coordinates: 22°57′57″S 43°10′24″W

- Arena de Vôlei de Praia (Portuguese)
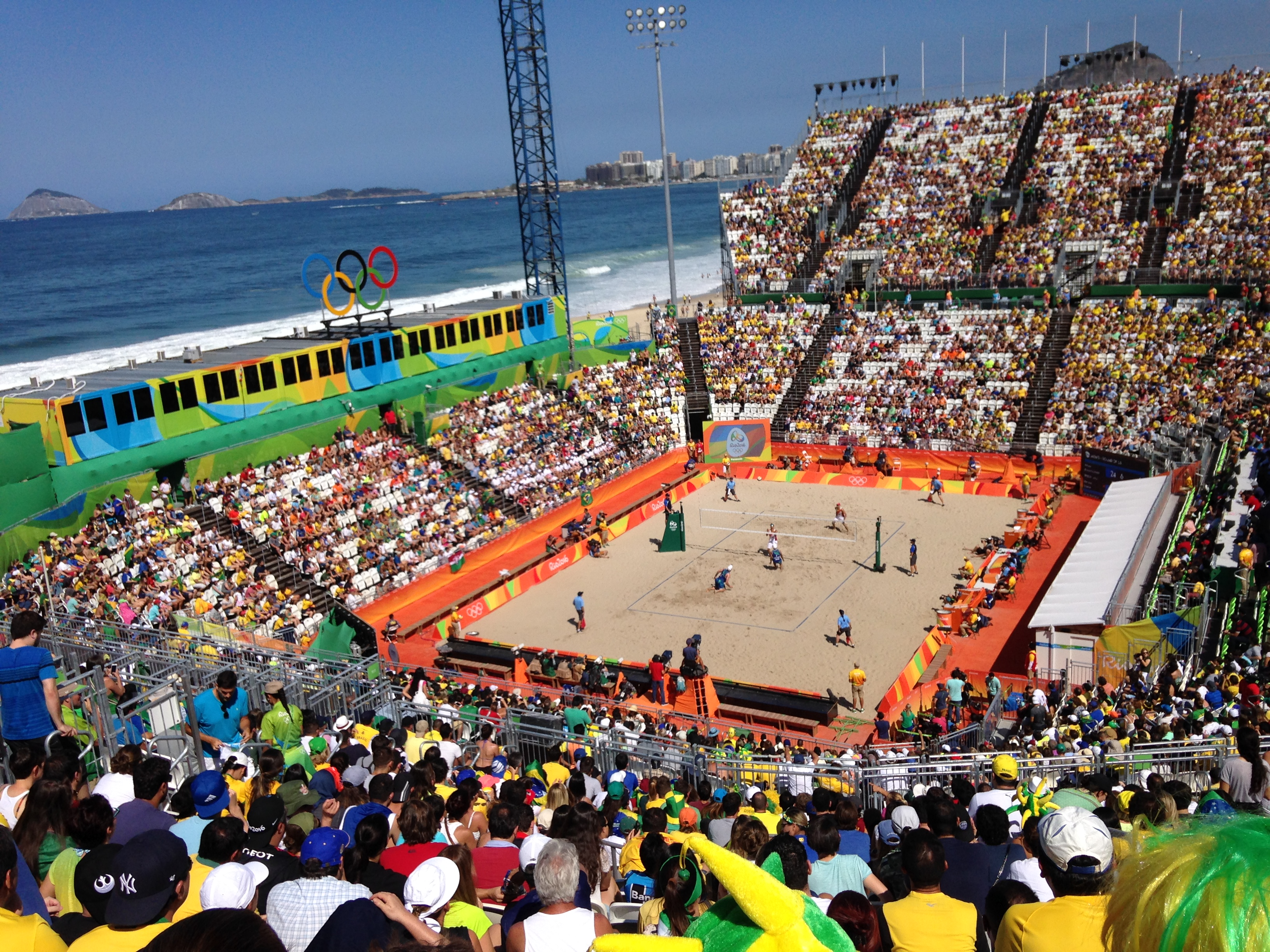
- The Copacabana Stadium during an Olympic volleyball match
- Interactive map of Copacabana Stadium
- Location: Copacabana beach, Rio de Janeiro, Brazil
- Capacity: 12,000
- Surface: Sand

Construction
- Built: 2016
- Opened: July 26, 2016

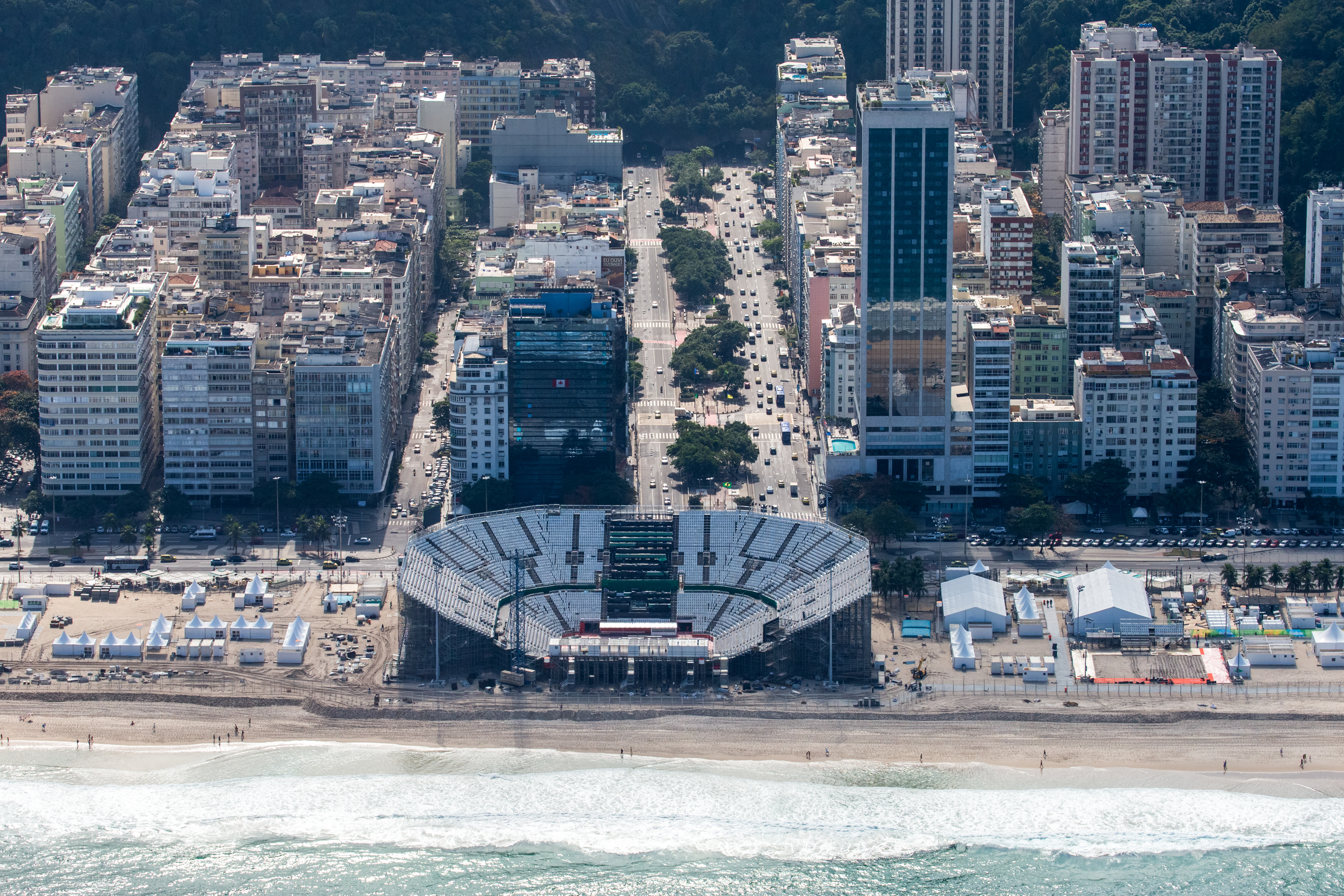
Copacabana Stadium in May 2016, while under construction

Copacabana Stadium, also known as the Beach Volleyball Arena (Portuguese: Arena de Vôlei de Praia), was a temporary stadium located on Copacabana beach, in Rio de Janeiro, Brazil, that hosted the beach volleyball competition of the 2016 Summer Olympics. It was erected in 2016 specifically for the Olympic Games and was planned to be dismantled after the Games.

It opened on 26 July 2016 and had a seating capacity of 12,000.

== Predecessor ==
The site has previously been used for other international sports competitions, using temporary facilities. In 2007, the site hosted the 2007 Pan American Games' beach volleyball, triathlon and aquatic marathon competitions, it also hosted same sports at the 2011 Military World Games. For triathlon, the swimming stage was placed at one end of the beach – Posto 6 – and the cycling and racing events were held between Posto 2 and Posto 6. The swimming marathon used the same structure of triathlon. Beach volleyball matches were played at the Copacabana Arena on Posto 2.

== See also ==
- Volleyball at the 2016 Summer Olympics
