= Robin Seidl =

Austrian beach volleyball player

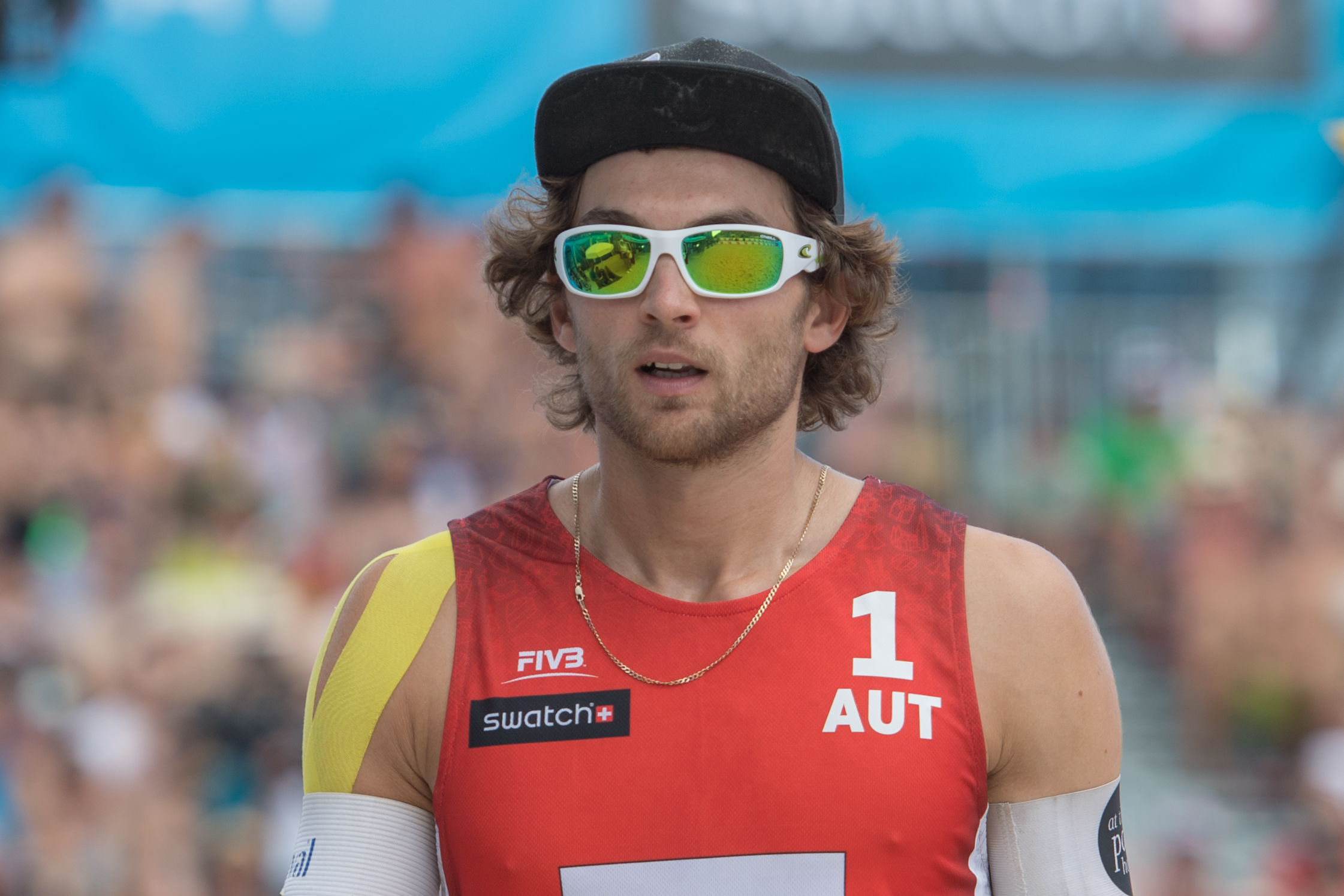

Personal information
- Nationality: Austrian
- Born: 21 January 1990 (age 36)

Sport
- Sport: Beach volleyball

Robin Seidl (born 21 January 1990) is an Austrian beach volleyball player.

He competed at the 2016 Summer Olympics in Rio de Janeiro, in the men's beach volleyball tournament.
