= Bruno Oscar Schmidt =

Brazilian beach volleyball player

Bruno Schmidt
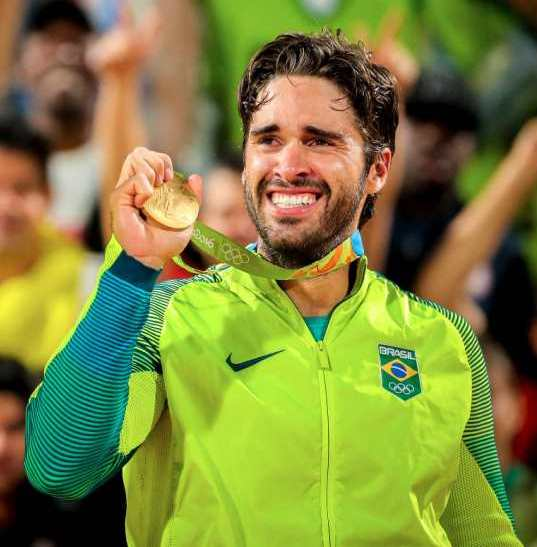
- Schmidt in 2016

Personal information
- Full name: Bruno Oscar Schmidt
- Born: 6 October 1986 (age 40); Brasília, DF, Brazil
- Hometown: Vila Velha, ES, Brazil
- Height: 185 cm (6 ft 1 in)

Beach volleyball information

Current teammate
Teammate
Evandro Oliveira

Previous teammates
Years	Teammate
2005; 2006, 2013; 2007–2009, 2012; 2010–2012; 2014–2018; 2019–	Vinícius Santos; Pedro Solberg Salgado; João Maciel; Benjamin Insfran; Alison Cerutti; Evandro Oliveira
Honours
Men's beach volleyball
Representing Brazil
Olympic Games
Gold medal – first place	2016 Rio de Janeiro	Beach
World Championships
Gold medal – first place	2015 The Hague	Beach
U21 World Championships
Gold medal – first place	2006 Myslowice	Beach

Bruno Oscar Schmidt (born 6 October 1986) is a Brazilian beach volleyball player . Bruno is the nephew of the former Brazilian basketball player Oscar Schmidt and of the TV news announcer Tadeu Schmidt. In 2010, he was named the FIVB Beach Volleyball World Tour Most Improved Player. He was also named the Best Defensive Player in 2013, 2014, 2015, and 2016. Schmidt won the gold medal at the 2015 World Championships with his teammate Alison Cerutti in the Netherlands. He won the gold medal at the 2016 Rio Olympics with Alison Cerutti.

== Career ==
Bruno first played volleyball in the hall. Since he did not like the position of the player, he moved to beach volleyball. He was ninth in the U21 World Cup in Rio de Janeiro in 2005 with Vinícius de Almeida Santos. A year later, he won the competition in Mysłowice with Pedro Solberg Salgado. In 2007, he formed a duo with Joao Maciel. After ninth and fifth place at the Challenger tournaments in Brno and Cyprus, Bruno / Maciel won the satellite tournament in Lausanne. At the Fortaleza Open, they played their first tournament of the FIVB World Tour. In 2008, they were defeated in three open tournaments in the "Country Quota" and were 17th in Barcelona. This was followed by a fourth place at Challenger in Brno and a final appearance at the Lausanne Satellite. Then Bruno / Maciel became seventh in the Marseille Open and landed a top-ten result for the first time on the World Tour. They also succeeded in their first Grand Slams in Gstaad and Klagenfurt. In Kristiansand, they were defeated in the final by the Spaniards Herrera / Mesa. Then they were seventh in Mallorca and fourth in Guarujá. At the 2009 World Championships in Stavanger, they made it as runner-ups into the first major round. Then they lost against the Latvians Samoilovs / Sorokins. On the World Tour, they finished fifth in Marseille and Stare Jabłonki, and three times ended up in ninth place.

On the World Tour 2010, Bruno played with Benjamin Insfran. In their first joint appearance, Bruno / Benjamin achieved third place in Brasília. After that, they finished fifth in Shanghai and had three ninth places before becoming fifth again in Prague. They also achieved this result in Marseille and Kristiansand. At their last FIVB tournament of the year, they reached the final, defeating American Jennings / Wong. At the beginning of the World Tour 2011, they finished seventh in Brasília and ninth in Beijing. At the World Cup in Rome, they reached the second round as the second of their group, in which they eliminated the Polish couple Fijałek / Prudel. After a fifth place at the Grand Slam in Moscow, they parted ways temporarily. The rest of the season, Bruno completed with his former partner Joao Maciel. The duo's best results were ninth place in Quebec and fourth place in Klagenfurt.

In 2012, Bruno and Benjamin were reunited. In all tournaments in which they were on the court together, they achieved top ten results on the World Tour 2012. They were fourth in Shanghai, fifth in Moscow and Gstaad, and three times ninth. Bruno finished fifth at the Grand Slam in Stare Jablonki with Thiago Santos Barbosa. In the 2013 season, Bruno played with Pedro Solberg Salgado. After a fifth place in Fuzhou, they made the final of the Grand Slam in Shanghai, which they lost to Gibb / Patterson. They finished fourth in Corrientes and then won the Grand Slam in The Hague against Samoilovs / Šmēdiņš. In Rome, they finished third. At the World Championships in Stare Jabłonki, a third place was enough in the preliminary round to advance further. Then Bruno / Pedro reached the quarter-finals with two victories, but they then lost against Brouwer / Meeuwsen. At the next Grand Slam in Gstaad, they lost the final against their compatriots Filho / Ricardo. Then they finished in ninth place three times in a row before they could win the final in São Paulo against Dalhausser / Jennings. Their last joint result was third place in Durban.

In 2014, Bruno formed a new duo with Alison Cerutti, with whom he won the South American Games in Santiago de Chile in March and reached the finals in the Fuzhou Open against the Italians Nicolai / Lupo. Besides Shanghai, Alison / Bruno always topped the World Tour 2014. They were, among other things, third in Berlin and lost the final in Gstaad against Dalhausser / Rosenthal. In the final of the Grand Slam in Klagenfurt, they managed to win their revenge against Nicolai / Lupo. Bruno played a few tournaments on the national tour with Luciano Ferreira de Paula. The 2015 season started for Alison / Bruno with fourth place in Moscow. After finishing 17th in the Poreč Major, they finished ninth twice. At the World Cup in the Netherlands, they lost only one set until the finals. In the final, they won against the Dutch Nummerdor / Varenhorst. Alison became the world champion for the second time. Subsequently, Alison / Bruno successively won the Gstaad Major and the Grand Slams in Yokohama, Long Beach, and Olsztyn. They also won the World Tour Final with a win against Dalhausser / Lucena. They became World Tour Champions and received the "Team of the Year" award.

At the beginning of the 2016 season, Alison / Bruno won the Vitória Open in the final against Nicolai / Lupo after finishing in fifth place in Rio de Janeiro. In the finals of the Grand Slams in Moscow and Olsztyn, they lost against Nummerdor / Varenhorst and the Latvians Samoilovs / Šmēdiņš. They succeeded in Poreč against the Austrian duo Doppler / Horst in the next tournament victory. As world champions, they were set for the Olympic Games in Rio. Despite a defeat by Doppler / Horst, they won their group. With wins against Herrera / Gavira, Dalhausser / Lucena, and the Dutch Brouwer / Robert Meeuwsen, they made it into the final, where they won 2-0 against Nicolai / Lupo. At the end of the season, Alison / Bruno were able to repeat their victory in the World Tour Final from the year before in Toronto. At the 2017 World Cup in Vienna, the Brazilians landed in ninth place only. After staying behind their previous World Tour successes, Alison and Bruno parted in May 2018. After that, Bruno played until January 2019 again at the side of Pedro Solberg and, since then, with Evandro.

Sporting positions
Preceded by Jānis Šmēdiņš and Aleksandrs Samoilovs (LAT)	Men's FIVB Beach Volley World Tour Winner alongside (Brazil) Alison Cerutti; 2015	Succeeded by Jānis Šmēdiņš and Aleksandrs Samoilovs (LAT)
Awards
Preceded by Mārtiņš Pļaviņš (LAT)	Men's FIVB World Tour "Best Defender"; 2013–2016	Succeeded by Viacheslav Krasilnikov (RUS)
Preceded by Paolo Nicolai (ITA)	Men's FIVB World Tour "Best Attacker"; 2015	Succeeded by Jānis Šmēdiņš (LAT)
Preceded by Alison Cerutti (BRA)	Men's FIVB World Tour "Most Improved"; 2010	Succeeded by Mariusz Prudel (POL)
Preceded by Phil Dalhausser (USA)	Men's FIVB World Tour "Most Outstanding"; 2015–2016	Succeeded by Phil Dalhausser (USA)
Preceded by Emanuel Rego (BRA)	Men's FIVB World Tour "Sportsperson"; 2015–2016	Succeeded by Álvaro Morais Filho (BRA)
Preceded by Jānis Šmēdiņš and Aleksandrs Samoilovs (LAT)	Men's FIVB World Tour "Team of the Year" alongside (Brazil) Alison Cerutti; 2015	Succeeded by Jānis Šmēdiņš and Aleksandrs Samoilovs (LAT)
