= Chaim Schalk =

American beach volleyball player (born 1986)

Personal information
- Nationality: American
- Born: April 23, 1986 (age 40)
- Home town: Red Deer, Alberta
- Education: Trinity Western University
- Height: 6 ft 5 in (1.96 m)
- Weight: 194 lb (88 kg)
Honours
Men's beach volleyball
Representing the United States
World Tour
Bronze medal – third place	2025 Playa del Carmen	Beach

Chaim Schalk (born April 23, 1986) is an American beach volleyball player. Schalk placed ninth at the 2016 Summer Olympics.

== Early life ==
Chaim Schalk grew up in Red Deer, Canada. He has four competitive brothers. He grew up learning how to fight and work for everything (including food at the dinner table). Chaim started playing volleyball at age of 12. He and his brothers erected a makeshift net in their backyard. After picking up beach volleyball, he pestered his father to build a sand court where he and his high school friends could play. His father arranged for a truck to dump the sand, but he and his friends had to level it out. Chaim credits the backyard beach court for taking him from just enjoying the game, to wanting to really pursue it.

== Transition to beach volleyball ==
Up until 2009, Chaim's primary focus was indoor volleyball. He was a setter and a Second-Team All-Canadian while playing for the Trinity Western Spartans for two seasons from 2006 to 2008. He also won two National Championships with Red Deer College.

That all changed when Chaim made the Canadian Beach Volleyball National Team and competed on the FIVB World Tour in 2010.

=== The Albertans ===
The two Albertans (Chaim Schalk and Ben Saxton) teamed up near the end of the 2012 season, in part, because both were in favor of spending more time training in California with the top American teams. They won their first tournament together, at a NORCECA event in Chula Vista, cementing the partnership. Another early highlight was a fifth-place finish at the 2013 World Championships in Stare Joblonki, Poland, for Canada's best ever men's result at the global event, after defeating one of the top teams in the world, Latvia's Janis Smedins and Aleksandrs Samoilovs. Saxton and Schalk went on to reach their first ever FIVB World Tour podium in 2014, claiming bronze at the Parana Open in Argentina. They closed the season with a victory at the NORCECA continental championship. Their 2015 season included podium finishes at the Yokohama and Olsztyn Grand Slam events. They reached a Major Series podium for the first time in July 2016, taking bronze in Porec, Croatia.

== 2016 Summer Olympics ==
In their Olympic debut at Rio 2016, Saxton and Schalk advanced to round 16. Taking ninth place in Men's Beach Volleyball at the 2016 Summer Olympics.

== Post-2016 Career and Transition in United States ==
After competing for Canada at the 2016 Rio Olympics—where Schalk and his partner Ben Saxton reached the round of 16 and finished in ninth place—Schalk ended his partnership with Saxton in 2017 and began the process of transferring his international representation from Canada to the United States. Owing to his dual citizenship, he was required to sit out international competition for a period before he could officially compete for Team USA.

Since that time, Schalk has participated in various events on the AVP Tour and in FIVB competitions. His results include:

- A win at the AVP Seattle Open in 2019 and a title at Hermosa Beach in 2022, along with several podium finishes on the World Tour.
- A fourth-place finish at the 2022 FIVB World Championships in Rome with partner Theodore Brunner.
- A series of partnership changes, including teaming up with Tri Bourne in 2023 and with James Shaw in 2024.

Schalk is currently preparing to represent Team USA at the 2024 Paris Olympics, however withdrew following injuries and health concerns.
