= Lars Flüggen =

German volleyball player (born 1990)

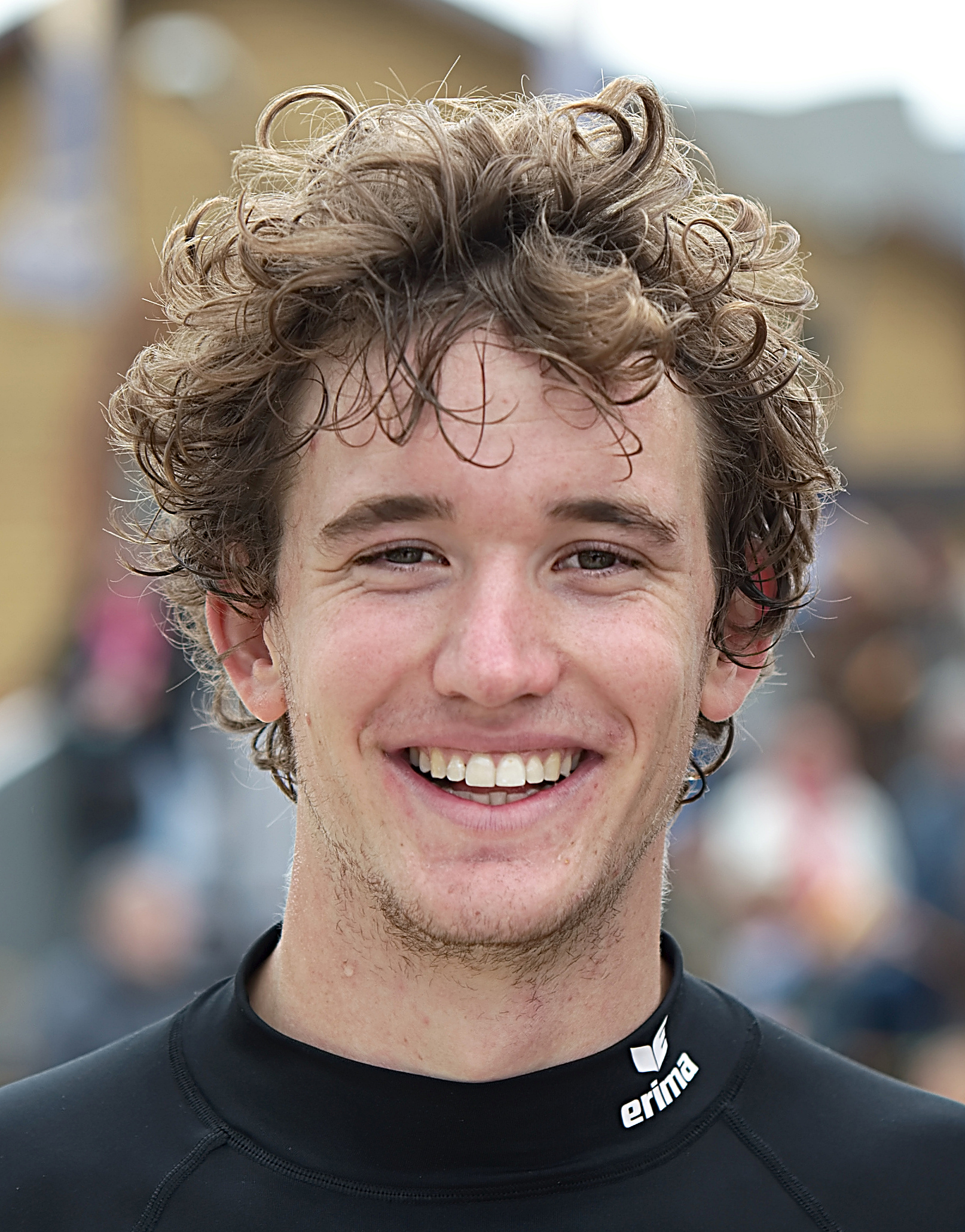

Personal information
- Nationality: German
- Born: 24 May 1990 (age 36); Germany
- Height: 1.92 m (6 ft 4 in)
- Weight: 83 kg (183 lb)

Lars Flüggen (born 24 May 1990) is a German Olympic volleyball player. He competed at the 2016 Summer Olympics in men's beach volleyball with partner Markus Bröckermann.
