= Markus Böckermann =

German volleyball player (born 1986)

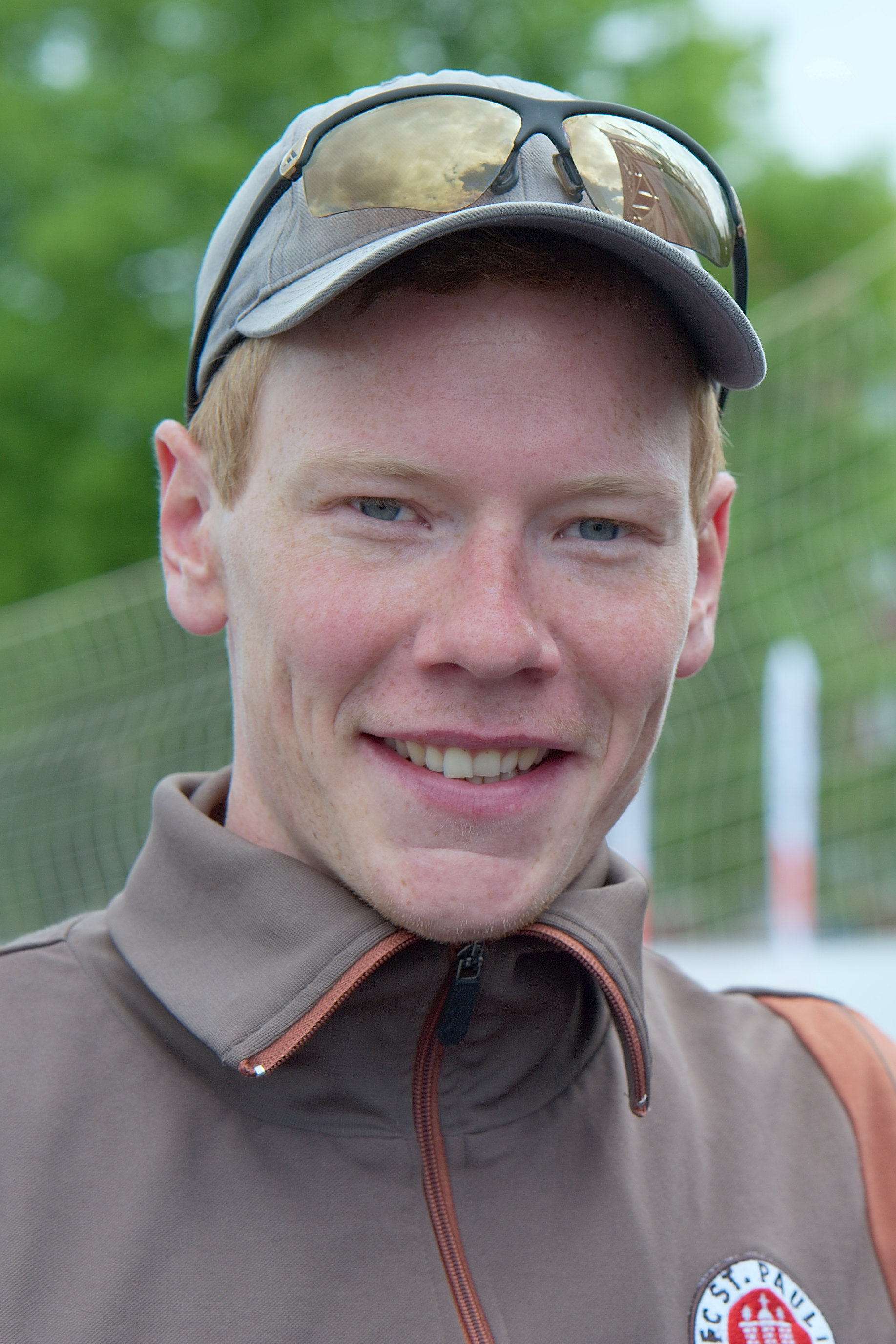

Personal information
- Nationality: German
- Born: 14 January 1986 (age 40); Germany
- Height: 1.99 m (6 ft 6 in)
- Weight: 97 kg (214 lb)

Markus Böckermann (born 14 January 1986) is a German Olympic volleyball player. He competed in men's beach volleyball with partner Lars Flüggen at the 2016 Summer Olympics.
