= Ben Saxton (volleyball) =

Canadian beach volleyball player (born 1988)

Personal information
- Born: 21 November 1988 (age 37) Calgary, Alberta, Canada

Sport
- Sport: Beach volleyball

Benjamin Saxton (born November 21, 1988, in Calgary, Alberta) is a Canadian beach volleyball player. Saxton has qualified to compete (along with partner Chaim Schalk) at the 2016 Summer Olympics.

== Career ==
Saxton played volleyball and beach volleyball as a youth in his hometown at the Canuck Stuff Volleyball Club. Together with Will Pasieka, they became the 2004 Canadian U16 champions. In both 2004 and 2005 they were the Canadian U18 runners-up, but returned as the U20 Canadian champions in 2006 and also participated in the U19 World Championships. In 2007, Saxton played with Mark Ellingson in international tournaments. After Saxton had played two smaller tournaments with Martin Reader in 2008, he started with Jessi Lelliott, and in 2010 with Steve Marshall on the FIVB World Tour, but with little success. Even with Christian Redmann, there were no top-ten places on the FIVB World Tour, but Redmann / Saxton won the silver medal at the NORCECA Championship 2011 in Mexico. Since 2013, Saxton has played successfully alongside Chaim Schalk. At the World Cup in Stare, Jabłonki Saxton / Schalk made it to the quarterfinals. Here they were defeated by the Brazilians Alison / Emanuel and took fifth place.
