= Choaib Belhaj Salah =

Tunesian beach volleyball player (born 1987)

Personal information
- Born: 4 June 1987 (age 38); Menzel Temime Tunisia
- Height: 1.94 m (6 ft 4 in)
- Weight: 93 kg (205 lb)

Choaib Belhaj Salah (born 4 June 1987) is a Tunisian Olympic volleyball player.
