= Lombardo Ontiveros =

Mexican volleyball player (born 1983)

Personal information
- Full name: Rodolfo Lombardo Ontiveros Gómez
- Nationality: Mexican
- Born: 9 November 1983 (age 42); Mazatlán, Sinaloa
- Height: 185 cm (6 ft 1 in)
- Weight: 82 kg (181 lb)

Volleyball information
- Number: 1
Honours
Men's beach volleyball
Representing Mexico
Pan American Games
Gold medal – first place	2015 Toronto	Beach
Silver medal – second place	2019 Lima	Beach

Rodolfo Lombardo Ontiveros Gómez (born 9 November 1983) is a Mexican male volleyball and beach volleyball player.

Awards
Preceded by Ryan Doherty (USA)	Men's FIVB World Tour "Most Improved"; 2015	Succeeded by Piotr Kantor (POL)
