= Alex Ranghieri =

Italian volleyball player (born 1987)

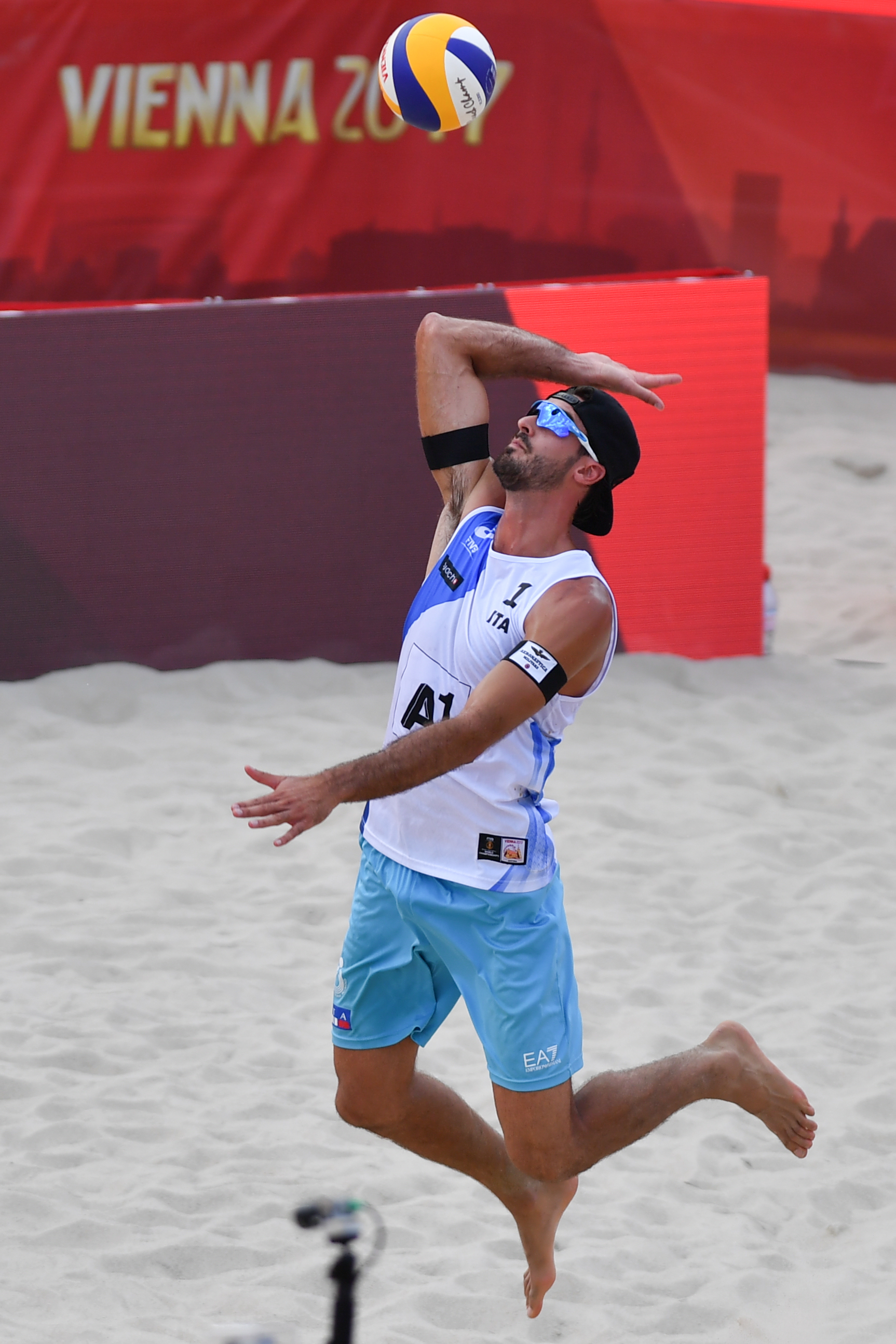
- Ranghieri in 2017

Personal information
- Nationality: Italy
- Born: 18 June 1987 (age 39); Pordenone, Italy
- Height: 2.00 m (6 ft 7 in)
- Weight: 94 kg (207 lb)
Honours
Men's beach volleyball
Representing Italy
European Championships
Silver medal – second place	2015 Klagenfurt	Beach

Alex Ranghieri (born 18 June 1987) is an Italian Olympic volleyball player.
