= Mohamed Arafet Naceur =

Tunesian beach volleyball player (born 1988)

Personal information
- Nationality: Tunisia
- Born: November 4, 1988 (age 37); Hammam Ghezaz Tunisia
- Height: 1.90 m (6 ft 3 in)
- Weight: 76 kg (168 lb)

Mohamed Arafet Naceur (born November 4, 1988) is a Tunisian Olympic volleyball player.
