= 2019 FIVB Beach Volleyball World Tour =

Professional beach volleyball circuit

2018–2019 FIVB Beach Volleyball World Tour
Tournament details
- Host country: Various
- Dates: August 2018 – September 2019
- Venues: 56 (in 56 host cities)

The 2019 FIVB Beach Volleyball World Tour is the global elite professional beach volleyball circuit organized by the Fédération Internationale de Volleyball (FIVB) for the 2018 beach volleyball season. Starts in late August 2018 after the end of the year season, the 2019 FIVB Beach Volleyball World Tour Calendar comprised by three FIVB World Tour 5-star tournaments (including the World Tour Finals), twelve FIVB World Tour 4-star, five 3-star, eight 2-star and twenty-seven 1-star event, all organised by the FIVB. The World Championships will be held in Hamburg, Germany from June 28 to July 7, 2019.

The full calendar of events was announced on September 18, 2018.

== Schedule ==
Key

World Tour Finals
5-star tournament/Major Series
4-star tournament
3-star tournament
2-star tournament
1-star tournament

=== Men ===
Tournament	Champions	Runners-up	Third place	Fourth place
Siófok Open; Siófok, Hungary; US$10,000; 23–26 August 2018	Romain Di Giantommaso (FRA); Jérémy Silvestre (FRA); 21–15, 18–21, 15–12	Patrikas Stankevičius (LTU); Matas Navickas (LTU)	Eric Stadie (GER); Robin Sowa (GER); 21–18, 21–19	Đorđe Klašnić (SRB); Marko Plavšić (SRB)
Montpellier Open; Montpellier, France; US$10,000; 28 August–1 September 2018	Édouard Rowlandson (FRA); Olivier Barthélémy (FRA); 21–15, 21–12	Youssef Krou (FRA); Quincy Ayé (FRA)	Romain Di Giantommaso (FRA); Jérémy Silvestre (FRA); 21–16, 25–27, 15–10	Florian Breer (SUI); Yves Haussener (SUI)
Qinzhou Open; Qinzhou, China; US$75,000; 30 September–4 October 2018	Tri Bourne (USA); Trevor Crabb (USA); 21–18, 21–9	Taras Myskiv (RUS); Valeriy Samoday (RUS)	Dries Koekelkoren (BEL); Tom van Walle (BEL); 21–13, 21–13	Cole Durant (AUS); Damien Schumann (AUS)
Caspian Sea Series Bandar Torkaman Tour; Bandar Torkaman, Iran; US$10,000; 2–5 October 2018	Bahman Salemi (IRI); Arash Vakili (IRI); 21–11, 22–20	Rahman Raoufi (IRI); Abdolhamed Mirzaali (IRI)	Abbas Pourasgari (IRI); Aghmohammad Salagh (IRI); 21–16, 21–11	Alexey Kuleshov (KAZ); Artem Petrossyants (KAZ)
Caspian Sea Series Babolsar Tour; Babolsar, Iran; US$10,000; 9–12 October 2018	Rahman Raoufi (IRI); Abdolhamed Mirzaali (IRI); 21–19, 21–19	Alexey Sidorenko (KAZ); Alexandr Dyachenko (KAZ)	Alireza Aghajani (IRI); Abbas Pourasgari (IRI); 21–18, 21–16	Danijel Pokeršnik (SLO); Gašper Plahutnik (SLO)
Yangzhou Open; Yangzhou, China; US$150,000; 10–14 October 2018	Konstantin Semenov (RUS); Ilya Leshukov (RUS); 14–21, 21–19, 15–13	Viacheslav Krasilnikov (RUS); Oleg Stoyanovskiy (RUS)	Gustavo Carvalhaes (BRA); Saymon Santos (BRA); Injury team B	Sam Pedlow (CAN); Sam Schachter (CAN)
Caspian Sea Series Bandar Anzali Tour; Bandar-e Anzali, Iran; US$10,000; 16–19 October 2018	Alexey Sidorenko (KAZ); Alexandr Dyachenko (KAZ); Injury team A	Bahman Salemi (IRI); Arash Vakili (IRI)	Rahman Raoufi (IRI); Abdolhamed Mirzaali (IRI); 21–18, 21–17	Abbas Pourasgari (IRI); Alireza Aghajani (IRI)
Las Vegas Open; Las Vegas, United States; US$150,000; 17–21 October 2018	Christian Sørum (NOR); Anders Mol (NOR); 21–13, 21–17	Grzegorz Fijałek (POL); Michał Bryl (POL)	Viacheslav Krasilnikov (RUS); Oleg Stoyanovskiy (RUS); 21–13, 18–21, 20–18	Trevor Crabb (USA); Tri Bourne (USA)
Ljubljana Winter Edition; Ljubljana, Slovenia; US$10,000; 29 November–2 December 2018	Aliaksandr Dziadkou (BLR); Pavel Piatrushka (BLR); 21–19, 21–16	Selçuk Şekerci (TUR); Safa Urlu (TUR)	Paul Burnett (AUS); Maximilian Guehrer (AUS); 16–21, 21–9, 16–14	Robin Sowa (GER); Eric Stadie (GER)
The Hague Open; The Hague, Netherlands; US$150,000; 2–6 January 2019	Viacheslav Krasilnikov (RUS); Oleg Stoyanovskiy (RUS); 21–11, 21–18	Julius Thole (GER); Clemens Wickler (GER)	Konstantin Semenov (RUS); Ilya Leshukov (RUS); 21–17, 14–21, 15–12	Alexander Brouwer (NED); Robert Meeuwsen (NED)
Vizag Open India; Visakhapatnam, India; US$10,000; 28 February–3 March 2019	Armin Dollinger (GER); Simon Kulzer (GER) w/o	Hsieh Ya-jen (TPE); Wang Chin-ju (TPE)	Sergiy Grabovskyy (CAN); Cameron Wheelan (CAN); 21–15, 21–17	Hitoshi Murakami (JPN); Takashi Tsuchiya (JPN)
Sydney Open; Sydney, Australia; US$75,000; 6–10 March 2019	Marco Grimalt (CHI); Esteban Grimalt (CHI); 21–18, 21–12	Enrico Rossi (ITA); Adrian Carambula (ITA)	Stafford Slick (USA); William Allen (USA) w/o	Youssef Krou (FRA); Édouard Rowlandson (FRA)
Kg Speu Open; Kampong Speu, Cambodia; US$10,000; 7–10 March 2019	Maxim Sivolap (RUS); Artem Yarzutkin (RUS); 21–18, 21–18	Grant Goldschmidt (RSA); Leo Williams (RSA)	Mads Rosager (DEN); Jacob Brinck (DEN); 21–18, 18–21, 15–10	Moritz Kindl (AUT); Arwin Kopschar (AUT)
Doha Open; Doha, Qatar; US$150,000; 12–16 March 2019	Marco Grimalt (CHI); Esteban Grimalt (CHI); 21–15, 21–15	Nick Lucena (USA); Phil Dalhausser (USA)	Pablo Herrera (ESP); Adrián Gavira (ESP); 21–17, 23–21	Michał Bryl (POL); Grzegorz Fijałek (POL)
Siem Reap Open; Siem Reap, Cambodia; US$50,000; 21–24 March 2019	Christoph Dressler (AUT); Alexander Huber (AUT); 16–21, 21–13, 15–13	Maxim Sivolap (RUS); Artem Yarzutkin (RUS)	Quentin Métral (SUI); Yves Haussener (SUI); 18–21, 21–10, 15–12	Peter Eglseer (AUT); Florian Schnetzer (AUT)
SMM Pak Bara Beach in Satun; Satun, Thailand; US$10,000; 8–11 April 2019	Denys Denysenko (UKR); Vladyslav Iemelianchyk (UKR); 21–10, 21–14	Rahman Raoufi (IRI); Abolhamed Mirzaali (IRI)	Dmitriy Yakovlev (KAZ); Sergey Bogatu (KAZ); 28–26, 14–21, 15–9	Dunwinit Kaewsai (THA); Kitti Duangjinda (THA)
Langkawi Open; Langkawi, Malaysia; US$10,000; 11–14 April 2019	Daniil Kuvichka (RUS); Anton Kislytsyn (RUS); 21–16, 21–15	Andrey Bolgov (RUS); Vladislav Ermilov (RUS)	Takashi Tsuchiya (JPN); Hitoshi Murakami (JPN); 21–15, 21–18	Adrian Sdebel (POL); Piotr Ilewicz (POL)
Göteborg Open; Gothenburg, Sweden; US$10,000; 18–21 April 2019	Aliaksandr Dziadkou (BLR); Pavel Piatrushka (BLR); 21–14, 21–14	Toms Šmēdiņš (LAT); Haralds Regža (LAT)	Selçuk Şekerci (TUR); Safa Urlu (TUR); 21–13, 21–14	Martin Appelgren (SWE); Alexander Annerstedt (SWE)
Xiamen Open; Xiamen, China; US$150,000; 24–28 April 2019	Viacheslav Krasilnikov (RUS); Oleg Stoyanovskiy (RUS); 21–19, 21–13	Pablo Herrera (ESP); Adrián Gavira (ESP)	Cherif Younousse (QAT); Ahmed Tijan (QAT); 13–21, 21–15, 15–10	Enrico Rossi (ITA); Adrian Carambula (ITA)
Kuala Lumpur Open; Kuala Lumpur, Malaysia; US$75,000; 30 April–4 May 2019	Alison Cerutti (BRA); Álvaro Morais Filho (BRA); 24–22, 21–18	Reid Priddy (USA); Theo Brunner (USA)	John Hyden (USA); Ryan Doherty (USA); 21–17, 21–7	Alexander Walkenhorst (GER); Sven Winter (GER)
Itapema Open; Itapema, Brazil; US$150,000; 15–19 May 2019	Anders Mol (NOR); Christian Sørum (NOR); 21–19, 28–26	Michał Bryl (POL); Grzegorz Fijałek (POL)	Steven van de Velde (NED); Christiaan Varenhorst (NED) w/o	Piotr Kantor (POL); Bartosz Łosiak (POL)
Aydin Masters; Aydın, Turkey; US$50,000; 16–19 May 2019	Maciej Rudoł (POL); Jakub Szałankiewicz (POL); 21–14, 19–21, 15–13	Alex Ranghieri (ITA); Marco Caminati (ITA)	Sven Winter (GER); Alexander Walkenhorst (GER); 21–16, 21–17	Jasper Bouter (NED); Ruben Penninga (NED)
Jinjiang Open presented by Jinjiang Culture & Tourism; Jinjiang, China; US$150,000; 22–26 May 2019	Anders Mol (NOR); Christian Sørum (NOR); 14–21, 21–17, 15–12	Evandro Oliveira (BRA); Bruno Oscar Schmidt (BRA)	George Wanderley (BRA); André Stein (BRA); 21–17, 21–10	Trevor Crabb (USA); Tri Bourne (USA)
Boracay Open; Boracay, Philippines; US$10,000; 23–26 May 2019	Banlue Nakprakhong (THA); Narongdet Kangkon (THA); 19–21, 22–20, 15–8	Yuya Ageba (JPN); Nobuaki Taira (JPN)	Jumpei Ikeda (JPN); Katsuhiro Shiratori (JPN); 16–21, 26–24, 16–14	Maximilian Trummer (AUT); Simon Baldauf (AUT)
Ostrava Open; Ostrava, Czech Republic; US$150,000; 29 May–2 June 2019	Anders Mol (NOR); Christian Sørum (NOR); 17–21, 21–15, 15–10	Ondřej Perušič (CZE); David Schweiner (CZE)	Michał Bryl (POL); Grzegorz Fijałek (POL); 10–21, 21–19, 15–7	Viacheslav Krasilnikov (RUS); Oleg Stoyanovskiy (RUS)
Baden Open presented by Sport.Land.Nö; Baden, Austria; US$10,000; 6–10 June 2019	Clemens Doppler (AUT); Alexander Horst (AUT); 21–16, 21–17	Maxim Sivolap (RUS); Artem Yarzutkin (RUS)	Alejandro Huerta (ESP); César Menéndez (ESP); 21–19, 18–21, 16–14	Christoph Dressler (AUT); Alexander Huber (AUT)
Warsaw Open; Warsaw, Poland; US$150,000; 12–16 June 2019	Evandro Oliveira (BRA); Bruno Oscar Schmidt (BRA); 11–21, 21–17, 15–12	Anders Mol (NOR); Christian Sørum (NOR)	Ilya Leshukov (RUS); Konstantin Semenov (RUS); 21–19, 17–21, 16–14	Viacheslav Krasilnikov (RUS); Oleg Stoyanovskiy (RUS)
Ios Island Open; Ios, Greece; US$10,000; 14–16 June 2019	Florian Gosselin (FRA); Jérémy Silvestre (FRA); 21–16, 15–21, 15–12	Maxim Sivolap (RUS); Artem Yarzutkin (RUS)	David Lenc (CZE); Filip Habr (CZE); 19–21, 21–18, 15–11	Felix Friedl (AUT); Maximilian Trummer (AUT)
World Championships; Hamburg, Germany; US$500,000; 28 June–7 July 2019	Viacheslav Krasilnikov (RUS); Oleg Stoyanovskiy (RUS); 19–21, 21–17, 15–11	Julius Thole (GER); Clemens Wickler (GER)	Anders Mol (NOR); Christian Sørum (NOR); 19–21, 21–15, 15–10	Tri Bourne (USA); Trevor Crabb (USA)
Qidong Open; Qidong, China; US$50,000; 4–7 July 2019	Christoph Dressler (AUT); Alexander Huber (AUT); 21–18, 21–13	Peter Eglseer (AUT); Florian Schnetzer (AUT)	Surin Jongklang (THA); Adisorn Khaolumtarn (THA); 24–22, 24–22	Maxim Sivolap (RUS); Artem Yarzutkin (RUS)
Gstaad Major; Gstaad, Switzerland; US$300,000; 9–13 July 2019	Anders Mol (NOR); Christian Sørum (NOR); 21–17, 21–15	Alexander Brouwer (NED); Robert Meeuwsen (NED)	Evandro Oliveira (BRA); Bruno Oscar Schmidt (BRA); 16–21, 21–17, 15–12	Paolo Nicolai (ITA); Daniele Lupo (ITA)
Espinho Open; Espinho, Portugal; US$150,000; 17–21 July 2019	Alison Cerutti (BRA); Álvaro Morais Filho (BRA); 21–13, 15–21, 15–9	George Wanderley (BRA); André Stein (BRA)	Mārtiņš Pļaviņš (LAT); Edgars Točs (LAT); 21–13, 21–18	Marco Grimalt (CHL); Esteban Grimalt (CHL)
Edmonton Open; Edmonton, Canada; US$75,000; 17–21 July 2019	Nico Beeler (SUI); Marco Krattiger (SUI); 21–15, 23–25, 15–8	Grant O'Gorman (CAN); Ben Saxton (CAN)	Stafford Slick (USA); William Allen (USA); 21–13, 21–16	Alex Ranghieri (ITA); Marco Caminati (ITA)
Tokyo Open; Tokyo, Japan; US$150,000; 24–28 July 2019	Anders Mol (NOR); Christian Sørum (NOR); 21–17, 21–18	Nils Ehlers (GER); Lars Flüggen (GER)	Alexander Brouwer (NED); Robert Meeuwsen (NED); 21–12, 21–17	Alison Cerutti (BRA); Álvaro Morais Filho (BRA)
WT 1 star in Emilia Romagna presented by BPER; Cervia, Italy; US$10,000; 25–28 July 2019	Maksim Hudyakov (RUS); Igor Velichko (RUS); 22–20, 15–21, 15–12	Florian Ertl (AUT); Johannes Kratz (AUT)	Maxim Sivolap (RUS); Artem Yarzutkin (RUS); 21–19, 21–14	Grant Goldschmidt (RSA); Leo Williams (RSA)
Vienna Major; Vienna, Austria; US$300,000; 31 July–4 August 2019	Anders Mol (NOR); Christian Sørum (NOR); 21–11, 21–17	Alison Cerutti (BRA); Álvaro Morais Filho (BRA)	Michał Bryl (POL); Grzegorz Fijałek (POL); 21–17, 17–21, 15–11	Phil Dalhausser (USA); Nick Lucena (USA)
Ljubljana Open; Ljubljana, Slovenia; US$10,000; 1–4 August 2019	Tadej Boženk (SLO); Vid Jakopin (SLO); 16–21, 21–18, 15–11	Jan Pokeršnik (SLO); Nejc Zemljak (SLO)	Yorick de Groot (NED); Mees Blom (NED); 21–18, 21–18	Florian Ertl (AUT); Johannes Kratz (AUT)
Malbork Open; Malbork, Poland; US$10,000; 1–4 August 2019	Michał Kądzioła (POL); Marcin Ociepski (POL); 23–21, 21–17	Patrikas Stankevičius (LTU); Audrius Knašas (LTU)	Mariusz Prudel (POL); Mikolaj Miszczuk (POL); 24–22, 21–15	Martin Chiniewicz (POL); Michal Korycki (POL)
Beacharena Vaduz; Vaduz, Liechtenstein; US$10,000; 7–11 August 2019	Moritz Kindl (AUT); Mathias Seiser (AUT); 17–21, 21–19, 16–14	Daniil Kuvichka (RUS); Anton Kislytsyn (RUS)	Jasper Bouter (NED); Ruben Penninga (NED); 21–18, 21–15	Florian Ertl (AUT); Johannes Kratz (AUT)
Miguel Pereira Open; Miguel Pereira, Brazil; US$10,000; 8–11 August 2019	Renato Carvalho (BRA); Rafael Carvalho (BRA); 21–19, 24–22	Arthur Lanci (BRA); Adrielson Silva (BRA)	Hevaldo Moreira (BRA); Vinícius Freitas (BRA); 12–21, 21–15, 15–13	Joalisson Gomes (BRA); Leonardo Vieira (BRA)
Budapest Open; Budapest, Hungary; US$10,000; 8–11 August 2019	Samuele Cottafava (ITA); Jakob Windisch (ITA); 21–16, 19–21, 15–9	Daniel Bergerud (NOR); Lars Retterholt (NOR)	Toms Šmēdiņš (LAT); Haralds Regža (LAT); 21–18, 23–21	Kensuke Shōji (JPN); Masato Kurasaka (JPN)
Moscow Open; Moscow, Russia; US$150,000; 14–18 August 2019	Aleksandrs Samoilovs (LAT); Jānis Šmēdiņš (LAT); 21–12, 21–16	Alison Cerutti (BRA); Álvaro Morais Filho (BRA)	Julius Thole (GER); Clemens Wickler (GER) w/o	Gustavo Carvalhaes (BRA); Saymon Santos (BRA)
Knokke-Heist Open; Knokke-Heist, Belgium; US$10,000; 15–18 August 2019	Jérémy Silvestre (FRA); Timothée Platre (FRA); 21–18, 19–21, 17–15	Pavel Shustrov (RUS); Alexey Gusev (RUS)	Maximilian Trummer (AUT); Mathias Seiser (AUT); 21–15, 21–13	Anshel ver Eecke (BEL); Tim Lemmens (BEL)
Rubavu Open; Rubavu, Rwanda; US$10,000; 21–24 August 2019	Kensuke Shōji (JPN); Masato Kurasaka (JPN); 12–21, 21–17, 17–15	Jacob Stormly (DEN); Nicolai Overgaard (DEN)	Javier Bello (ENG); Joaquin Bello (ENG); 21–18, 21–15	Hitoshi Murakami (JPN); Keisuke Shimizu (JPN)
Jūrmala Open; Jūrmala, Latvia; US$75,000; 21–25 August 2019	Aleksandrs Samoilovs (LAT); Jānis Šmēdiņš (LAT); 23–21, 21–14	Kusti Nõlvak (EST); Mart Tiisaar (EST)	Aliaksandr Dziadkou (BLR); Pavel Piatrushka (BLR); 21–19, 21–16	Armin Dollinger (GER); Eric Stadie (GER)
Salalah Open; Salalah, Oman; US$10,000; 24–27 August 2019	Daniel Thomsen (DEN); Morten Overgaard (DEN); 21–23, 21–11, 15–9	Haitham Alshereiqi (OMA); Ahmed Alhousni (OMA)	Piotr Janiak (POL); Piotr Ilewicz (POL); 21–15, 12–21, 15–9	Nouh Al-Jalbubi (OMA); Mazin Alhashmi (OMA)
Montpellier Open; Montpellier, France; US$10,000; 27–31 August 2019	Dirk Boehlé (NED); Stefan Boermans (NED); 25–23, 21–15	Quincy Ayé (FRA); Arnaud Gauthier-Rat (FRA)	Laurenz Leitner (AUT); Florian Schnetzer (AUT); 21–15, 25–27, 15–8	Michael Murauer (AUT); Arwin Kopschar (AUT)
Oslo Open; Oslo, Norway; US$10,000; 28 August–1 September 2019	Anders Mol (NOR); Nils Ringøen (NOR); 21–16, 21–18	Markus Mol (NOR); Christian Sørum (NOR)	Hendrik Mol (NOR); Mathias Berntsen (NOR); 23–21, 21–10	Lars Retterholt (NOR); Daniel Bergerud (NOR)
FIVB World Tour Finals; Rome, Italy; US$300,000; 4–8 September 2019	Viacheslav Krasilnikov (RUS); Oleg Stoyanovskiy (RUS); 21–16, 21–16	Julius Thole (GER); Clemens Wickler (GER)	Anders Mol (NOR); Christian Sørum (NOR); 21–16, 21–15	Jake Gibb (USA); Taylor Crabb (USA)

=== Women ===
Tournament	Champions	Runners-up	Third place	Fourth place
Siófok Open; Siófok, Hungary; US$10,000; 23–26 August 2018	Tjaša Jančar (SLO); Tjaša Kotnik (SLO); 21–19, 21–12	Sara Cavretti (SWE); Sofia Wahlén (SWE)	Satono Ishitsubo (JPN); Asami Shiba (JPN); 21–14, 21–17	Agata Ceynowa (POL); Martyna Kłoda (POL)
Montpellier Open; Montpellier, France; US$10,000; 28 August–1 September 2018	Alexandra Jupiter (FRA); Lézana Placette (FRA); 21–15, 12–21, 15–12	Esmée Böbner (SUI); Zoé Vergé-Dépré (SUI)	Nicole Eiholzer (SUI); Elena Steinemann (SUI); 22–20, 14–21, 15–6	Ophélie Lusson (FRA); Laura Longuet (FRA)
Zhongwei Open; Zhongwei, China; US$50,000; 14–16 September 2018	Wen Shuhui (CHN); Wang Jingzhe (CHN); 21–14, 26–24	Wang Fan (CHN); Xue Chen (CHN)	Maria Clara Salgado (BRA); Elize Maia (BRA); 21–18, 21–18	Zhu Lingdi (CHN); Lin Meimei (CHN)
Qinzhou Open; Qinzhou, China; US$75,000; 30 September–4 October 2018	Ana Patrícia Ramos (BRA); Rebecca Cavalcanti (BRA); 18–21, 21–15, 15–12	Marta Menegatti (ITA); Viktoria Orsi Toth (ITA)	Sarah Sponcil (USA); Kelly Claes (USA); 21–13, 21–16	Evgenia Ukolova (RUS); Ekaterina Birlova (RUS)
Yangzhou Open; Yangzhou, China; US$150,000; 10–14 October 2018	Alexandra Klineman (USA); April Ross (USA); 21–19, 21–16	Ana Patrícia Ramos (BRA); Rebecca Cavalcanti (BRA)	Sara Hughes (USA); Summer Ross (USA); 16–21, 23–21, 15–5	Sarah Pavan (CAN); Melissa Humana-Paredes (CAN)
Las Vegas Open; Las Vegas, United States; US$150,000; 17–21 October 2018	Heather Bansley (CAN); Brandie Wilkerson (CAN); 21–17, 17–21, 15–9	Sarah Pavan (CAN); Melissa Humana-Paredes (CAN)	Carolina Solberg Salgado (BRA); Maria Antonelli (BRA); Injury team B	Ana Patrícia Ramos (BRA); Rebecca Cavalcanti (BRA)
Chetumal Open; Chetumal, Mexico; US$75,000; 24–28 October 2018	Heather Bansley (CAN); Brandie Wilkerson (CAN); 21–12, 21–13	Caitlin Ledoux (USA); Geena Urango (USA)	Kerri Walsh Jennings (USA); Brooke Sweat (USA); 16–21, 21–8, 15–10	Megan McNamara (CAN); Nicole McNamara (CAN)
Ljubljana Winter Edition; Ljubljana, Slovenia; US$10,000; 29 November–2 December 2018	Panagiota Karagkouni (GRE); Vassiliki Arvaniti (GRE); 21–18, 21–15	Vytenė Vitkauskaitė (LTU); Urtė Andriukaitytė (LTU)	Diana Lunina (UKR); Maryna Samoday (UKR); 21–14, 21–15	Varvara Brailko (LAT); Anete Namiķe (LAT)
The Hague Open; The Hague, Netherlands; US$150,000; 2–6 January 2019	Ana Patrícia Ramos (BRA); Rebecca Cavalcanti (BRA); 21–10, 21–18	Sarah Sponcil (USA); Kelly Claes (USA)	Taru Lahti (FIN); Anniina Parkkinen (FIN); 15–21, 21–13, 15–6	Alexandra Klineman (USA); April Ross (USA)
Phnom Penh Open; Phnom Penh, Cambodia; US$50,000; 21–24 February 2019	Panagiota Karagkouni (GRE); Vassiliki Arvaniti (GRE); 21–14, 21–17	Amanda Dowdy (USA); Corinne Quiggle (USA)	Chiyo Suzuki (JPN); Yurika Sakaguchi (JPN); 19–21, 23–21, 15–12	Rumpaipruet Numwong (THA); Tanarattha Udomchavee (THA)
Vizag Open India; Visakhapatnam, India; US$10,000; 27 February–2 March 2019	Martina Bonnerová (CZE); Martina Maixnerová (CZE); 19–21, 21–18, 15–9	Chiyo Suzuki (JPN); Yurika Sakaguchi (JPN)	Nadine Strauss (AUT); Teresa Strauss (AUT); 21–16, 21–18	Miller Pata (VAN); Sherysyn Toko (VAN)
Sydney Open; Sydney, Australia; US$75,000; 6–10 March 2019	Becchara Palmer (AUS); Nicole Laird (AUS); 21–19, 16–21, 15–13	Emily Day (USA); Betsi Flint (USA)	Kerri Walsh Jennings (USA); Brooke Sweat (USA); 21–19, 21–19	Wang Fan (CHN); Xia Xinyi (CHN)
Battambang Open; Battambang, Cambodia; US$10,000; 4–7 April 2019	Lara Dykstra (USA); Cassie House (USA); 21–19, 21–14	Konstantina Tsopoulou (GRE); Dimitra Manavi (GRE)	Satono Ishitsubo (JPN); Asami Shiba (JPN); 22–20, 21–13	Sakurako Fujii (JPN); Minori Kumada (JPN)
SMM Pak Bara Beach in Satun; Satun, Thailand; US$10,000; 8–11 April 2019	Kou Nai-han (TPE); Liu Pi-hsin (TPE); 18–21, 21–18, 15–12	Miller Pata (VAN); Sherysyn Toko (VAN)	Diana Lunina (UKR); Maryna Samoday (UKR); 23–21, 21–15	Andrea Galindo (COL); Claudia Galindo (COL)
Langkawi Open; Langkawi, Malaysia; US$10,000; 11–14 April 2019	Lara Dykstra (USA); Cassie House (USA); 16–21, 21–19, 15–13	Diana Lunina (UKR); Maryna Samoday (UKR)	Konstantina Tsopoulou (GRE); Dimitra Manavi (GRE); 13–21, 21–13, 15–13	Mayu Sawame (JPN); Yurika Sakaguchi (JPN)
Göteborg Open; Gothenburg, Sweden; US$10,000; 18–21 April 2019	Emi van Driel (NED); Raïsa Schoon (NED); 21–17, 21–18	Inna Makhno (UKR); Iryna Makhno (UKR)	Ane Hjortland (NOR); Victoria Kjølberg (NOR); 21–14, 18–21, 17–15	Katja Stam (NED); Julia Wouters (NED)
Xiamen Open; Xiamen, China; US$150,000; 24–28 April 2019	Ana Patrícia Ramos (BRA); Rebecca Cavalcanti (BRA); 25–23, 26–24	Barbora Hermannová (CZE); Markéta Sluková (CZE)	Mariafe Artacho del Solar (AUS); Taliqua Clancy (AUS); 21–18, 21–13	Summer Ross (USA); Sara Hughes (USA)
Kuala Lumpur Open; Kuala Lumpur, Malaysia; US$75,000; 30 April–4 May 2019	Barbora Hermannová (CZE); Markéta Sluková (CZE); 24–26, 22–20, 15–12	Kerri Walsh Jennings (USA); Brooke Sweat (USA)	Julia Sude (GER); Karla Borger (GER); 23–21, 21–19	Paula Soria (ESP); María Belén Carro (ESP)
Tuan Chau Island Open; Tuần Châu, Vietnam; US$10,000; 9–12 May 2019	Ksenia Dabizha (RUS); Daria Rudykh (RUS); 21–16, 21–16	Ekaterina Syrtseva (RUS); Alexandra Moiseeva (RUS)	Yukako Suzuki (JPN); Yui Nagata (JPN); 21–19, 21–17	Beata Vaida (ROU); Ioana-Alexandra Ordean (ROU)
Itapema Open; Itapema, Brazil; US$150,000; 15–19 May 2019	Alix Klineman (USA); April Ross (USA); 25–23, 18–21, 15–10	Sarah Pavan (CAN); Melissa Humana-Paredes (CAN)	Heather Bansley (CAN); Brandie Wilkerson (CAN); 21–19, 17–21, 22–20	Marleen van Iersel (NED); Joy Stubbe (NED)
Aydin Masters; Aydın, Turkey; US$50,000; 16–19 May 2019	Maria Voronina (RUS); Mariia Bocharova (RUS); 21–17, 16–21, 16–14	Diana Lunina (UKR); Maryna Samoday (UKR)	Laura Caluori (SUI); Dunja Gerson (SUI); 21–14, 21–14	Taylor Pischke (CAN); Sophie Bukovec (CAN)
Jinjiang Open presented by Jinjiang Culture & Tourism; Jinjiang, China; US$150,000; 22–26 May 2019	Kerri Walsh Jennings (USA); Brooke Sweat (USA); 21–17, 21–19	Mariafe Artacho del Solar (AUS); Taliqua Clancy (AUS)	Ana Patrícia Ramos (BRA); Rebecca Cavalcanti (BRA); 21–19, 21–15	Ágatha Bednarczuk (BRA); Eduarda Santos Lisboa (BRA)
Boracay Open; Boracay, Philippines; US$10,000; 23–26 May 2019	Satono Ishitsubo (JPN); Asami Shiba (JPN); 21–15, 21–18	Sakurako Fujii (JPN); Minori Kumada (JPN)	Brittany Kendall (AUS); Stefanie Weiler (AUS); 23–25, 21–13, 15–13	Tjaša Kotnik (SLO); Tjaša Jančar (SLO)
Ostrava Open; Ostrava, Czech Republic; US$150,000; 29 May–2 June 2019	Ágatha Bednarczuk (BRA); Eduarda Santos Lisboa (BRA); 21–19, 21–17	Ana Patrícia Ramos (BRA); Rebecca Cavalcanti (BRA)	Sanne Keizer (NED); Madelein Meppelink (NED); 25–23, 21–17	Kerri Walsh Jennings (USA); Brooke Sweat (USA)
Silk Road Nantong; Nantong, China; US$50,000; 30 May–2 June 2019	Wen Shuhui (CHN); Wang Jingzhe (CHN); 21–9, 18–21, 15–12	Angela Lavalle (BRA); Carolina Horta (BRA)	Ksenia Dabizha (RUS); Daria Rudykh (RUS); 21–13, 21–16	Jagoda Gruszczyńska (POL); Aleksandra Gromadowska (POL)
Silk Road Tangshan; Nanjing, China; US$50,000; 6–9 June 2019	Wen Shuhui (CHN); Wang Jingzhe (CHN); 21–17, 21–15	Angela Lavalle (BRA); Carolina Horta (BRA)	Chiyo Suzuki (JPN); Yurika Sakaguchi (JPN); 21–18, 22–20	Agata Zuccarelli (ITA); Gaia Traballi (ITA)
Baden Open presented by Sport.Land.Nö; Baden, Austria; US$10,000; 6–10 June 2019	Katharina Schützenhöfer (AUT); Lena Plesiutschnig (AUT); 21–17, 21–12	Katja Stam (NED); Julia Wouters (NED)	Nadine Strauss (AUT); Teresa Strauss (AUT); 21–19, 18–21, 19–17	Sarah Cools (BEL); Lisa van den Vonder (BEL)
Warsaw Open; Warsaw, Poland; US$150,000; 12–16 June 2019	Mariafe Artacho del Solar (AUS); Taliqua Clancy (AUS); 22–20, 21–17	Kelley Larsen (USA); Emily Stockman (USA)	Ágatha Bednarczuk (BRA); Eduarda Santos Lisboa (BRA); 23–21, 21–16	Carolina Solberg Salgado (BRA); Maria Antonelli (BRA)
Ios Island Open; Ios, Greece; US$10,000; 14–16 June 2019	Konstantina Tsopoulou (GRE); Dimitra Manavi (GRE); 21–18, 21–16	Ioana-Alexandra Ordean (ROU); Beata Vaida (ROU)	Anaya Evans (ENG); Ellie Austin (ENG); 21–17, 22–20	Sofia Ögren (SWE); Camilla Nilsson (SWE)
World Championships; Hamburg, Germany; US$500,000; 28 June–7 July 2019	Sarah Pavan (CAN); Melissa Humana-Paredes (CAN); 23–21, 23–21	Alix Klineman (USA); April Ross (USA)	Mariafe Artacho del Solar (AUS); Taliqua Clancy (AUS); 21–18, 22–20	Nina Betschart (SUI); Tanja Hüberli (SUI)
Qidong Open; Qidong, China; US$50,000; 4–7 July 2019	Wen Shuhui (CHN); Wang Jingzhe (CHN); 21–14, 14–21, 15–7	Michaela Kubíčková (CZE); Michala Kvapilová (CZE)	Chiyo Suzuki (JPN); Yurika Sakaguchi (JPN); 21–17, 21–11	Kou Nai-han (TPE); Liu Pi-hsin (TPE)
Gstaad Major; Gstaad, Switzerland; US$300,000; 9–14 July 2019	April Ross (USA); Alix Klineman (USA); 15–21, 21–17, 15–12	Carolina Solberg Salgado (BRA); Maria Antonelli (BRA)	Ana Patrícia Ramos (BRA); Rebecca Cavalcanti (BRA); 21–14, 21–12	Tanja Hüberli (SUI); Nina Betschart (SUI)
Daegu Open; Daegu, South Korea; US$10,000; 11–14 July 2019	Alexandra Moiseeva (RUS); Ekaterina Syrtseva (RUS); 15–21, 21–17, 15–12	Kaho Sakaguchi (JPN); Reika Murakami (JPN)	Dhita Juliana (INA); Putu Utami (INA); 17–21, 21–18, 16–14	Eva Freiberger (AUT); Valerie Teufl (AUT)
Alba Adriatica presented by Offertevillaggi.com; Alba Adriatica, Italy; US$10,000; 12–14 July 2019	Emi van Driel (NED); Raïsa Schoon (NED); 21–17, 21–11	Agata Zuccarelli (ITA); Gaia Traballi (ITA)	Katja Stam (NED); Julia Wouters (NED); 21–16, 21–17	Federica Frasca (ITA); Arianna Barboni (ITA)
Espinho Open; Espinho, Portugal; US$150,000; 17–21 July 2019	Nadezda Makroguzova (RUS); Svetlana Kholomina (RUS); 21–17, 21–16	Kelly Claes (USA); Sarah Sponcil (USA)	Ana Patrícia Ramos (BRA); Rebecca Cavalcanti (BRA); 21–18, 18–21, 15–12	Ágatha Bednarczuk (BRA); Eduarda Santos Lisboa (BRA)
Edmonton Open; Edmonton, Canada; US$75,000; 17–21 July 2019	Sarah Pavan (CAN); Melissa Humana-Paredes (CAN); 21–11, 21–16	Betsi Flint (USA); Emily Day (USA)	Akiko Hasegawa (JPN); Azusa Futami (JPN); 21–19, 21–17	Becchara Palmer (AUS); Nicole Laird (AUS)
Tokyo Open; Tokyo, Japan; US$150,000; 24–28 July 2019	Ágatha Bednarczuk (BRA); Eduarda Santos Lisboa (BRA); 21–19, 21–18	April Ross (USA); Alix Klineman (USA)	Heather Bansley (CAN); Brandie Wilkerson (CAN); 21–19, 21–11	Julia Sude (GER); Karla Borger (GER)
Vienna Major; Vienna, Austria; US$300,000; 31 July–4 August 2019	Sarah Pavan (CAN); Melissa Humana-Paredes (CAN); 21–19, 21–16	Carolina Solberg Salgado (BRA); Maria Antonelli (BRA)	Ágatha Bednarczuk (BRA); Eduarda Santos Lisboa (BRA); 31–29, 21–19	Taiana Lima (BRA); Talita Antunes (BRA)
Ljubljana Open; Ljubljana, Slovenia; US$10,000; 1–4 August 2019	Inna Makhno (UKR); Iryna Makhno (UKR); 14–21, 21–16, 15–13	Ane Hjortland (NOR); Victoria Kjølberg (NOR)	Katja Stam (NED); Julia Wouters (NED); 21–13, 21–11	Kaho Sakaguchi (JPN); Reika Murakami (JPN)
Beacharena Vaduz; Vaduz, Liechtenstein; US$10,000; 7–11 August 2019	Emma Piersma (NED); Pleun Ypma (NED); 21–14, 21–14	Reika Murakami (JPN); Kaho Sakaguchi (JPN)	Sayaka Mizoe (JPN); Suzuka Hashimoto (JPN) w/o	Katja Stam (NED); Julia Wouters (NED)
Miguel Pereira Open; Miguel Pereira, Brazil; US$10,000; 8–11 August 2019	Diana Silva (BRA); Andressa Ramalho (BRA); 21–14, 19–21, 15–9	Vitória Rodrigues (BRA); Vanilda Leão (BRA)	Josemari Alves (BRA); Juliana Silva (BRA); 20–22, 21–16, 15–13	Izabel Santos (BRA); Aline Lebioda (BRA)
Budapest Open; Budapest, Hungary; US$10,000; 8–11 August 2019	Chiyo Suzuki (JPN); Yurika Sakaguchi (JPN); 19–21, 21–17, 15–8	Daria Mastikova (RUS); Polina Tsyganova (RUS)	Emi van Driel (NED); Raïsa Schoon (NED); 21–14, 21–15	Francesca Kirwan (NZL); Olivia MacDonald (NZL)
Moscow Open; Moscow, Russia; US$150,000; 14–18 August 2019	Anouk Vergé-Dépré (SUI); Joana Heidrich (SUI); 21–18, 16–21, 15–8	Taiana Lima (BRA); Talita Antunes (BRA)	Kerri Walsh Jennings (USA); Brooke Sweat (USA); 24–26, 21–18, 15–10	Julia Sude (GER); Karla Borger (GER)
Knokke-Heist Open; Knokke-Heist, Belgium; US$10,000; 15–18 August 2019	Andrea Galindo (COL); Claudia Galindo (COL); 21–16, 19–21, 15–10	Cecilie Olsen (DEN); Sofia Bisgaard (DEN)	Emi van Driel (NED); Raïsa Schoon (NED); 21–13, 21–17	Els Vandesteene (BEL); Maud Catry (BEL)
Rubavu Open; Rubavu, Rwanda; US$10,000; 21–24 August 2019	Iris Reinders (NED); Mexime van Driel (NED); 21–16, 23–21	Cecilie Olsen (DEN); Signe Zibrandtsen (DEN)	Victoria Palmer (ENG); Jessica Grimson (ENG); 21–10, 21–14	Charlotte Nzayisenga (RWA); Judith Hakizimana (RWA)
Zhongwei Open; Zhongwei, China; US$50,000; 22–25 August 2019	Wen Shuhui (CHN); Wang Jingzhe (CHN); 21–17, 13–21, 15–13	Sayaka Mizoe (JPN); Miki Koshikawa (JPN)	Chen Chunxia (CHN); Zhu Lingdi (CHN); 21–13, 21–16	Chiyo Suzuki (JPN); Yurika Sakaguchi (JPN)
FIVB World Tour Finals; Rome, Italy; US$300,000; 4–8 September 2019	Laura Ludwig (GER); Margareta Kozuch (GER); 21–19, 21–17	Ágatha Bednarczuk (BRA); Eduarda Santos Lisboa (BRA)	Ana Patrícia Ramos (BRA); Rebecca Cavalcanti (BRA); 19–21, 21–18, 16–14	Anouk Vergé-Dépré (SUI); Joana Heidrich (SUI)

== Medal table by country ==
Rank	Nation	Gold	Silver	Bronze	Total
1	Russia	12	10	5	27
2	Brazil	10	14	13	37
3	Norway	8	4	4	16
4	United States	7	12	8	27
5	Canada	5	3	3	11
6	Netherlands	5	2	9	16
7	Austria	5	2	4	11
8	France	5	2	1	8
9	China	5	1	1	7
10	Japan	3	6	10	19
11	Greece	3	1	1	5
12	Germany	2	4	4	10
13	Iran	2	3	3	8
14	Ukraine	2	3	2	7
15	Czech Republic	2	3	1	6
16	Poland	2	2	4	8
17	Australia	2	1	4	7
18	Switzerland	2	1	3	6
19	Latvia	2	1	2	5
20	Slovenia	2	1	0	3
21	Belarus	2	0	1	3
22	Chile	2	0	0	2
23	Italy	1	4	0	5
24	Denmark	1	3	1	5
25	Kazakhstan	1	1	1	3
26	Chinese Taipei	1	1	0	2
27	Thailand	1	0	1	2
28	Colombia	1	0	0	1
29	Lithuania	0	3	0	3
30	Spain	0	1	2	3
31	Turkey	0	1	1	2
32	Estonia	0	1	0	1
32	Oman	0	1	0	1
32	Romania	0	1	0	1
32	South Africa	0	1	0	1
32	Sweden	0	1	0	1
32	Vanuatu	0	1	0	1
38	England	0	0	3	3
39	Belgium	0	0	1	1
39	Finland	0	0	1	1
39	Indonesia	0	0	1	1
39	Qatar	0	0	1	1
Totals (42 entries)		96	96	96	288
