= 2019 Beach Volleyball World Championships =

2019 World Championships
- Venue: Am Rothenbaum
- Location: Hamburg, Germany
- Dates: 28 June – 7 July

Champions
- Men: Russia; Oleg Stoyanovskiy; Viacheslav Krasilnikov
- Women: Canada; Sarah Pavan; Melissa Humana-Paredes

The 2019 Beach Volleyball World Championships was held in Hamburg, Germany from 28 June to 7 July 2019.

96 teams (192 players) competed for the title.

== Competition schedule ==
P	Preliminary round	LL	Lucky losers playoffs	1/16	Round of 32	1/8	Round of 16	1/4	Quarter-finals	1/2	Semi-finals	B	Bronze medal match	F	Final

Date Event	Fri 28	Sat 29	Sun 30	Mon 1	Tue 2		Wed 3		Thu 4	Fri 5		Sat 6		Sun 7	
Men's tournament	P	P	P	P	P		P	LL	1/16	1/8		1/4	1/2	B	F
Women's tournament	P	P	P	P	P	LL	1/16		1/8	1/4	1/2	B	F		

== Medal events ==
=== Medal table ===
Rank	Nation	Gold	Silver	Bronze	Total
1	Canada (CAN)	1	0	0	1
1	Russia (RUS)	1	0	0	1
3	Germany (GER)	0	1	0	1
3	United States (USA)	0	1	0	1
5	Australia (AUS)	0	0	1	1
5	Norway (NOR)	0	0	1	1
Totals (6 entries)		2	2	2	6

=== Medal summary ===
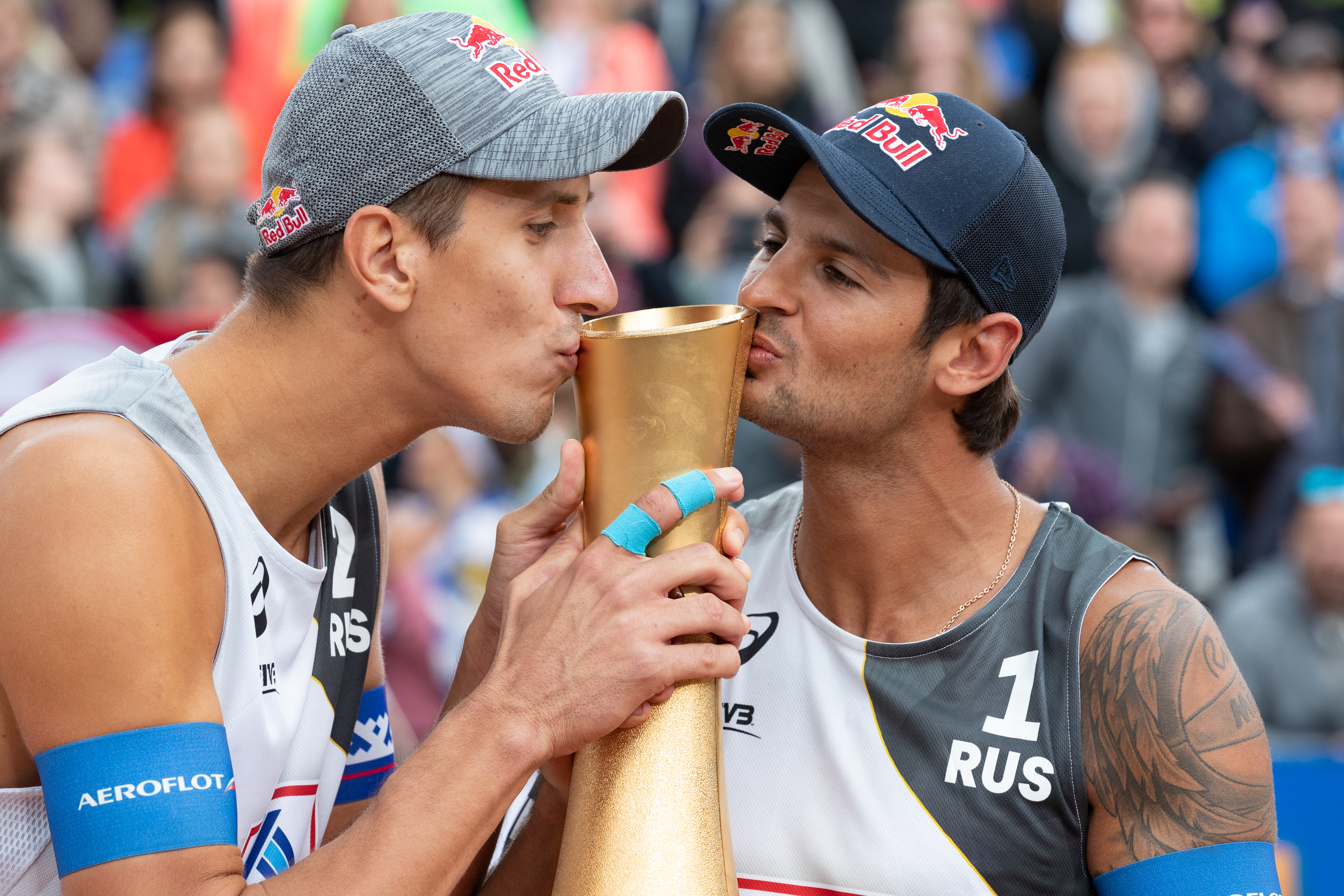

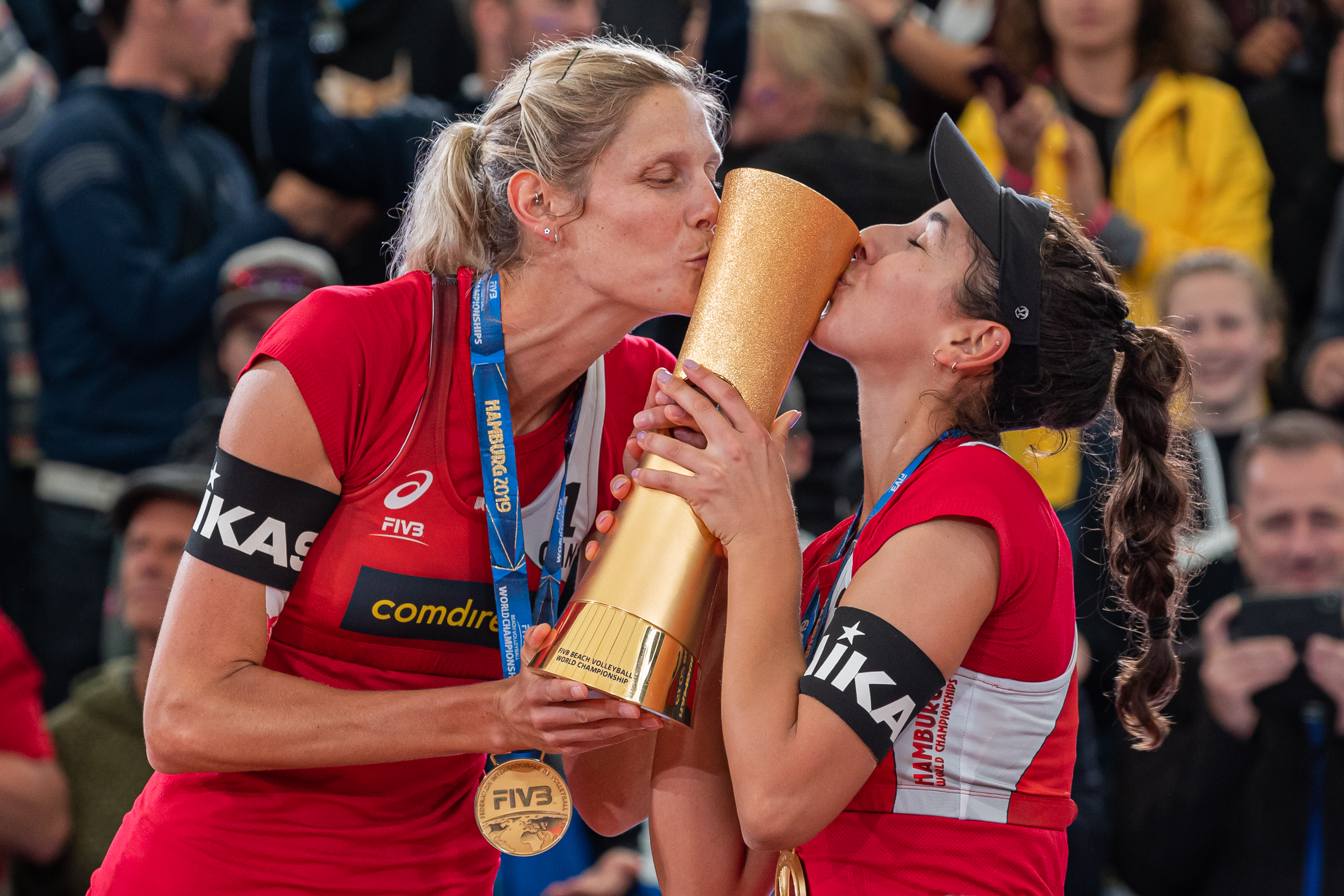

Event	Gold	Silver	Bronze
Men	Russia; Oleg Stoyanovskiy; Viacheslav Krasilnikov	Germany; Julius Thole; Clemens Wickler	Norway; Anders Mol; Christian Sørum
Women	Canada; Sarah Pavan; Melissa Humana-Paredes	United States; Alix Klineman; April Ross	Australia; Taliqua Clancy; Mariafe Artacho del Solar

== Men's tournament ==
=== Knockout stage bracket ===
Round of 32
4 July
Mol–Sørum (NOR)	2
Bergmann–Harms (GER)	0
4 July
Solberg–Felipe (BRA)	0
Pļaviņš–Tocs (LAT)	2
4 July
Evandro–Bruno (BRA)	0
Allen–Slick (USA)	2
4 July
Salemi–Vakili (IRN)	1
Nicolai–Lupo (ITA)	2
4 July
Alison–Filho (BRA)	2
Pedlow–Schachter (CAN)	0
4 July
Brouwer–Meeuwsen (NED)	0
Thole–Wickler (GER)	2
4 July
Lyamin–Myskiv (RUS)	2
Doppler–Horst (AUT)	1
4 July
Dalhausser–Lucena (USA)	2
Younousse–Tijan (QAT)	0
4 July
Stoyanovskiy–Krasilnikov (RUS)	2
Perušič–Schweiner (CZE)	0
4 July
Gibb–Ta. Crabb (USA)	2
Herrera–Gavira (ESP)	0
4 July
Heidrich–Gerson (SUI)	0
Carambula–Rossi (ITA)	2
4 July
Seidl–Waller (AUT)	2
Saxton–O'Gorman (CAN)	1
4 July
Kantor–Łosiak (POL)	0
Semenov–Leshukov (RUS)	2
4 July
Bourne–Tr. Crabb (USA)	2
Ehlers–Flüggen (GER)	1
4 July
Samoilovs–Šmēdiņš (LAT)	1
André–George (BRA)	2
4 July
Durant–Schumann (AUS)	0
Fijałek–Bryl (POL)	2

Round of 16
5 July
Mol–Sørum (NOR)	2
Pļaviņš–Tocs (LAT)	0
5 July
Allen–Slick (USA)	1
Nicolai–Lupo (ITA)	2
5 July
Alison–Filho (BRA)	0
Thole–Wickler (GER)	2
5 July
Lyamin–Myskiv (RUS)	0
Dalhausser–Lucena (USA)	2
5 July
Stoyanovskiy–Krasilnikov (RUS)	2
Gibb–Ta. Crabb (USA)	0
5 July
Carambula–Rossi (ITA)	2
Seidl–Waller (AUT)	0
5 July
Semenov–Leshukov (RUS)	0
Bourne–Tr. Crabb (USA)	2
5 July
André–George (BRA)	2
Fijałek–Bryl (POL)	1

Quarter-finals
6 July
Mol–Sørum (NOR)	2
Nicolai–Lupo (ITA)	0
6 July
Thole–Wickler (GER)	2
Dalhausser–Lucena (USA)	0
6 July
Stoyanovskiy–Krasilnikov (RUS)	2
Carambula–Rossi (ITA)	0
6 July
Bourne–Tr. Crabb (USA)	2
André–George (BRA)	1

Semi-finals
6 July
Mol–Sørum (NOR)	1
Thole–Wickler (GER)	2
6 July
Stoyanovskiy–Krasilnikov (RUS)	2
Bourne–Tr. Crabb (USA)	1

Final
7 July
Thole–Wickler (GER)	1
Stoyanovskiy–Krasilnikov (RUS)	2
Bronze medal match
7 July
Mol–Sørum (NOR)	2
Bourne–Tr. Crabb (USA)	1

== Women's tournament ==
=== Knockout stage bracket ===
Round of 32
3 July
Menegatti–Toth (ITA)	2
Gallay–Pereyra (ARG)	1
3 July
Ittlinger–Laboureur (GER)	1
Sponcil–Claes (USA)	2
3 July
Pavan–Humana-Paredes (CAN)	2
Xia–Wang F. (CHN)	0
3 July
Larsen–Stockman (USA)	1
Keizer–Meppelink (NED)	2
3 July
Borger–Sude (GER)	2
Behrens–Tillmann (GER)	1
3 July
Plesiutschnig–Schützenhöfer (AUT)	0
Bárbara–Fernanda (BRA)	2
3 July
Betschart–Hüberli (SUI)	2
Štrbová–Dubovcová (SVK)	1
3 July
Xue–Wang X. (CHN)	0
Ramos–Cavalcanti (BRA)	2
3 July
Heidrich–Vergé-Dépré (SUI)	2
Körtzinger–Schneider (GER)	1
3 July
Clancy–Artacho (AUS)	2
Bansley–Wilkerson (CAN)	0
3 July
Makroguzova–Kholomina (RUS)	2
Fernández–Baquerizo (ESP)	0
3 July
Sweat–Walsh Jennings (USA)	0
Ágatha–Duda (BRA)	2
3 July
Stubbe–Van Iersel (NED)	2
Bieneck–Schneider (GER)	0
3 July
Hughes–S. Ross (USA)	2
Kozuch–Ludwig (GER)	0
3 July
Klineman–A. Ross (USA)	2
Antonelli–Carol (BRA)	1
3 July
Ukolova–Birlova (RUS)	0
Graudina–Kravčenoka (LAT)	2

Round of 16
4 July
Menegatti–Toth (ITA)	2
Sponcil–Claes (USA)	0
4 July
Pavan–Humana-Paredes (CAN)	2
Keizer–Meppelink (NED)	1
4 July
Borger–Sude (GER)	1
Bárbara–Fernanda (BRA)	2
4 July
Betschart–Hüberli (SUI)	2
Ramos–Cavalcanti (BRA)	1
4 July
Heidrich–Vergé-Dépré (SUI)	1
Clancy–Artacho (AUS)	2
4 July
Makroguzova–Kholomina (RUS)	2
Ágatha–Duda (BRA)	1
4 July
Stubbe–Van Iersel (NED)	0
Hughes–S. Ross (USA)	2
4 July
Klineman–A. Ross (USA)	2
Graudina–Kravčenoka (LAT)	0

Quarter-finals
5 July
Menegatti–Toth (ITA)	0
Pavan–Humana-Paredes (CAN)	2
5 July
Bárbara–Fernanda (BRA)	1
Betschart–Hüberli (SUI)	2
5 July
Clancy–Artacho (AUS)	2
Makroguzova–Kholomina (RUS)	0
5 July
Hughes–S. Ross (USA)	0
Klineman–A. Ross (USA)	2

Semi-finals
5 July
Pavan–Humana-Paredes (CAN)	2
Betschart–Hüberli (SUI)	1
5 July
Clancy–Artacho (AUS)	0
Klineman–A. Ross (USA)	2

Final
6 July
Pavan–Humana-Paredes (CAN)	2
Klineman–A. Ross (USA)	0
Bronze medal match
6 July
Betschart–Hüberli (SUI)	0
Clancy–Artacho (AUS)	2
