= 2019 Beach Volleyball World Championships – Men's tournament =

Beachvolleyball-Weltmeisterschaft Hamburg 2019

Tournament details
- Host country: Germany
- City: Hamburg
- Dates: 28 June – 7 July
- Teams: 48 (from 5 confederations)

Final positions
- Champions: Russia; Oleg Stoyanovskiy; Viacheslav Krasilnikov (1st title)
- Runners-up: Germany; Julius Thole; Clemens Wickler
- Third place: Norway; Anders Mol; Christian Sørum
- Fourth place: United States; Tri Bourne; Trevor Crabb

The men's tournament was held from 28 June to 7 July.

Oleg Stoyanovskiy and Viacheslav Krasilnikov defeated Julius Thole and Clemens Wickler to win the title, while Anders Mol and Christian Sørum captured the bronze medal by beating Tri Bourne and Trevor Crabb.

== Qualification ==
There were 48 teams qualified for the tournament. Normally, the host country obtained two places in the competition as well as the top 23 teams from FIVB World ranking. But, there was a hosted team ranked among the 23 teams, so the next highest ranked team qualified. The next her 20 teams belonged to five continental confederation which got four spots each. The last three spots were appointed by FIVB.

Mean of qualification	Country	Qualifier	Seed
Host country	Germany	Nils Ehlers–Lars Flüggen	39
FIVB World Ranking	Norway	Anders Mol–Christian Sørum	1
FIVB World Ranking	Poland	Grzegorz Fijałek–Michał Bryl	2
FIVB World Ranking	Russia	Oleg Stoyanovskiy–Viacheslav Krasilnikov	3
FIVB World Ranking	Qatar	Cherif Younousse–Ahmed Tijan	4
FIVB World Ranking	Russia	Konstantin Semenov–Ilya Leshukov	5
FIVB World Ranking	United States	Phil Dalhausser–Nick Lucena	6
FIVB World Ranking	United States	Jake Gibb–Taylor Crabb	7
FIVB World Ranking	Italy	Paolo Nicolai–Daniele Lupo	8
FIVB World Ranking	Spain	Pablo Herrera–Adrián Gavira	9
FIVB World Ranking	Chile	Marco Grimalt–Esteban Grimalt	10
FIVB World Ranking	Latvia	Aleksandrs Samoilovs–Jānis Šmēdiņš	11
FIVB World Ranking	Germany	Julius Thole–Clemens Wickler	12
FIVB World Ranking	United States	Tri Bourne–Trevor Crabb	13
FIVB World Ranking	Canada	Sam Pedlow–Sam Schachter	14
FIVB World Ranking	Russia	Nikita Lyamin–Taras Myskiv	15
FIVB World Ranking	Brazil	Evandro Oliveira–Bruno Oscar Schmidt	16
FIVB World Ranking	Brazil	André Stein–George Wanderley	17
FIVB World Ranking	Poland	Piotr Kantor–Bartosz Łosiak	18
FIVB World Ranking	Netherlands	Alexander Brouwer–Robert Meeuwsen	19
FIVB World Ranking	Brazil	Alison Cerutti–Álvaro Morais Filho	20
FIVB World Ranking	Belgium	Dries Koekelkoren–Tom van Walle	21
FIVB World Ranking	Austria	Clemens Doppler–Alexander Horst	22
FIVB World Ranking	Latvia	Mārtiņš Pļaviņš–Edgars Tocs	23
FIVB World Ranking	Brazil	Pedro Solberg–Vitor Felipe	24
AVC Qualification	Australia	Cole Durant–Damien Schumann	33
AVC Qualification	Iran	Bahman Salemi–Arash Vakili	36
AVC Qualification	Qatar	Tamer Abdelrasoul–Assam Mahmoud	44
AVC Qualification	Japan	Yusuke Ishijima–Yuya Ageba	46
CAVB Qualification	Rwanda	Patrick Kavalo–Olivier Ntagengwa	37
CAVB Qualification	Mozambique	Delcio Soares–Aldevino Nguvo	41
CAVB Qualification	~~Sierra Leone~~	~~John Kamara–Ishmail Bangura~~	~~45~~
CAVB Qualification	Morocco	Mohamed Abicha–Zouheir Elgraoui	47
CEV Qualification	Czech Republic	Ondřej Perušič–David Schweiner	28
CEV Qualification	Russia	Maksim Hudyakov–Igor Velichko	31
CEV Qualification	Austria	Robin Seidl–Philipp Waller	32
CEV Qualification	Switzerland	Adrian Heidrich–Mirco Gerson	35
CSV Qualification	Chile	Ignacio Zavala–Gaspar Lammel	38
CSV Qualification	Venezuela	José Gómez–Carlos Rangel	40
CSV Qualification	Uruguay	Mauricio Vieyto–Marco Cairus	42
CSV Qualification	Argentina	Julián Azaad–Nicolás Capogrosso	43
NORCECA Qualification	United States	William Allen–Stafford Slick	29
NORCECA Qualification	Canada	Ben Saxton–Grant O'Gorman	30
NORCECA Qualification	Mexico	Lombardo Ontiveros–Juan Virgen	34
NORCECA Qualification	Cuba	Sergio González–Luis Reyes	48
Wild cards	Germany	Jonathan Erdmann–Sven Winter	25
Wild cards	Germany	Philipp Bergmann–Yannick Harms	26
Wild cards	Italy	Alex Ranghieri–Marco Caminati	27
Wild cards	Italy	Adrian Carambula–Enrico Rossi	45

== Preliminary round ==
The draw was held on 4 June 2019.

All times are local (UTC+2).

=== Pool A ===
Pos	Team	Pld	W	L	Pts	SW	SL	SR	SPW	SPL	SPR	Qualification
1	(Norway) Mol–Sørum	3	3	0	6	6	0	MAX	126	87	1.448	Round of 32
2	(Brazil) Solberg–Felipe	3	2	1	5	4	2	2.000	113	104	1.087	Round of 32
3	(Germany) Erdmann–Winter	3	1	2	4	2	4	0.500	111	123	0.902	Lucky losers playoffs
4	(Cuba) González–Reyes	3	0	3	3	0	6	0.000	91	127	0.717	

Date	Time		Score		Set 1	Set 2	Set 3	Total	Report
28 Jun	19:15	Mol–Sørum (Norway)	2–0	(Cuba) González–Reyes	21–10	21–14		42–24	Report
28 Jun	20:30	Solberg–Felipe (Brazil)	2–0	(Germany) Erdmann–Winter	21–18	21–16		42–34	Report
30 Jun	17:00	Mol–Sørum (Norway)	2–0	(Germany) Erdmann–Winter	21–18	21–16		42–34	Report
30 Jun	17:00	Solberg–Felipe (Brazil)	2–0	(Cuba) González–Reyes	21–12	21–16		42–28	Report
2 Jul	16:00	Erdmann–Winter (Germany)	2–0	(Cuba) González–Reyes	21–19	22–20		43–39	Report
2 Jul	17:00	Mol–Sørum (Norway)	2–0	(Brazil) Solberg–Felipe	21–14	21–15		42–29	Report

=== Pool B ===
Pos	Team	Pld	W	L	Pts	SW	SL	SR	SPW	SPL	SPR	Qualification
1	(Poland) Fijałek–Bryl	3	3	0	6	6	2	3.000	153	135	1.133	Round of 32
2	(Latvia) Pļaviņš–Tocs	3	2	1	5	5	2	2.500	141	120	1.175	Round of 32
3	(Germany) Bergmann–Harms	3	1	2	4	3	4	0.750	124	126	0.984	Lucky losers playoffs
4	(Morocco) Abicha–Elgraoui	3	0	3	3	0	6	0.000	89	126	0.706	

Date	Time		Score		Set 1	Set 2	Set 3	Total	Report
28 Jun	16:00	Fijałek–Bryl (Poland)	2–0	(Morocco) Abicha–Elgraoui	21–15	21–16		42–31	Report
28 Jun	16:00	Pļaviņš–Tocs (Latvia)	2–0	(Germany) Bergmann–Harms	21–19	21–16		42–35	Report
30 Jun	13:00	Fijałek–Bryl (Poland)	2–1	(Germany) Bergmann–Harms	21–17	16–21	15–9	52–47	Report
30 Jun	13:00	Pļaviņš–Tocs (Latvia)	2–0	(Morocco) Abicha–Elgraoui	21–11	21–15		42–26	Report
2 Jul	16:00	Fijałek–Bryl (Poland)	2–1	(Latvia) Pļaviņš–Tocs	21–18	18–21	20–18	59–57	Report
2 Jul	16:00	Bergmann–Harms (Germany)	2–0	(Morocco) Abicha–Elgraoui	21–16	21–16		42–32	Report

=== Pool C ===
Pos	Team	Pld	W	L	Pts	SW	SL	SR	SPW	SPL	SPR	Qualification
1	(Russia) Stoyanovskiy–Krasilnikov	3	3	0	6	6	0	MAX	129	90	1.433	Round of 32
2	(Austria) Doppler–Horst	3	2	1	5	4	2	2.000	117	107	1.093	Round of 32
3	(Italy) Ranghieri–Caminati	3	1	2	4	2	4	0.500	109	116	0.940	Lucky losers playoffs
4	(Japan) Ishijima–Ageba	3	0	3	3	0	6	0.000	84	126	0.667	

Date	Time		Score		Set 1	Set 2	Set 3	Total	Report
28 Jun	15:00	Stoyanovskiy–Krasilnikov (Russia)	2–0	(Japan) Ishijima–Ageba	21–10	21–13		42–23	Report
28 Jun	16:00	Doppler–Horst (Austria)	2–0	(Italy) Ranghieri–Caminati	21–18	21–15		42–33	Report
29 Jun	14:00	Doppler–Horst (Austria)	2–0	(Japan) Ishijima–Ageba	21–12	21–17		42–29	Report
29 Jun	16:00	Stoyanovskiy–Krasilnikov (Russia)	2–0	(Italy) Ranghieri–Caminati	21–16	21–18		42–34	Report
1 Jul	17:00	Stoyanovskiy–Krasilnikov (Russia)	2–0	(Austria) Doppler–Horst	24–22	21–11		45–33	Report
1 Jul	18:00	Ranghieri–Caminati (Italy)	2–0	(Japan) Ishijima–Ageba	21–15	21–17		42–32	Report

=== Pool D ===
Pos	Team	Pld	W	L	Pts	SW	SL	SR	SPW	SPL	SPR	Qualification
1	(Qatar) Younousse–Tijan	3	3	0	6	6	2	3.000	157	131	1.198	Round of 32
2	(Italy) Carambula–Rossi	3	2	1	5	5	3	1.667	150	146	1.027	Round of 32
3	(Czech Republic) Perušič–Schweiner	3	1	2	4	3	4	0.750	130	129	1.008	Lucky losers playoffs
4	(Belgium) Koekelkoren–Van Walle	3	0	3	3	1	6	0.167	109	140	0.779	

Date	Time		Score		Set 1	Set 2	Set 3	Total	Report
28 Jun	17:00	Koekelkoren–Van Walle (Belgium)	0–2	(Czech Republic) Perušič–Schweiner	18–21	11–21		29–42	Report
28 Jun	18:00	Younousse–Tijan (Qatar)	2–1	(Italy) Carambula–Rossi	19–21	21–14	18–16	58–51	Report
29 Jun	17:00	Younousse–Tijan (Qatar)	2–1	(Czech Republic) Perušič–Schweiner	18–21	21–13	18–16	57–50	Report
29 Jun	18:00	Koekelkoren–Van Walle (Belgium)	1–2	(Italy) Carambula–Rossi	22–20	18–21	10–15	50–56	Report
1 Jul	11:00	Younousse–Tijan (Qatar)	2–0	(Belgium) Koekelkoren–Van Walle	21–15	21–15		42–30	Report
1 Jul	11:00	Perušič–Schweiner (Czech Republic)	0–2	(Italy) Carambula–Rossi	18–21	20–22		38–43	Report

=== Pool E ===
Pos	Team	Pld	W	L	Pts	SW	SL	SR	SPW	SPL	SPR	Qualification
1	(Brazil) Alison–Filho	3	3	0	6	6	1	6.000	144	113	1.274	Round of 32
2	(United States) Allen–Slick	3	2	1	5	5	3	1.667	143	137	1.044	Round of 32
3	(Russia) Semenov–Leshukov	3	1	2	4	3	4	0.750	143	131	1.092	Round of 32
4	(Qatar) Abdelrasoul–Mahmoud	3	0	3	3	0	6	0.000	77	126	0.611	

Date	Time		Score		Set 1	Set 2	Set 3	Total	Report
28 Jun	13:00	Semenov–Leshukov (Russia)	2–0	(Qatar) Abdelrasoul–Mahmoud	21–15	21–14		42–29	Report
28 Jun	14:00	Alison–Filho (Brazil)	2–1	(United States) Allen–Slick	19–21	21–15	15–10	55–46	Report
30 Jun	16:00	Semenov–Leshukov (Russia)	1–2	(United States) Allen–Slick	21–13	25–27	12–15	58–55	Report
30 Jun	16:00	Alison–Filho (Brazil)	2–0	(Qatar) Abdelrasoul–Mahmoud	21–16	21–8		42–24	Report
2 Jul	15:00	Semenov–Leshukov (Russia)	0–2	(Brazil) Alison–Filho	24–26	19–21		43–47	Report
2 Jul	15:00	Allen–Slick (United States)	2–0	(Qatar) Abdelrasoul–Mahmoud	21–13	21–11		42–24	Report

=== Pool F ===
Pos	Team	Pld	W	L	Pts	SW	SL	SR	SPW	SPL	SPR	Qualification
1	(Canada) Saxton–O'Gorman	3	2	1	5	5	2	2.500	135	125	1.080	Round of 32
2	(Netherlands) Brouwer–Meeuwsen	3	2	1	5	4	3	1.333	138	128	1.078	Round of 32
3	(United States) Dalhausser–Lucena	3	1	2	4	2	4	0.500	111	111	1.000	Lucky losers playoffs
4	(Argentina) Azaad–Capogrosso	3	1	2	4	2	4	0.500	103	123	0.837	

Date	Time		Score		Set 1	Set 2	Set 3	Total	Report
28 Jun	10:00	Dalhausser–Lucena (United States)	2–0	(Argentina) Azaad–Capogrosso	21–14	21–13		42–27	Report
28 Jun	10:00	Brouwer–Meeuwsen (Netherlands)	2–1	(Canada) Saxton–O'Gorman	23–21	19–21	15–9	57–51	Report
30 Jun	19:00	Brouwer–Meeuwsen (Netherlands)	0–2	(Argentina) Azaad–Capogrosso	20–22	19–21		39–43	Report
30 Jun	19:15	Dalhausser–Lucena (United States)	0–2	(Canada) Saxton–O'Gorman	16–21	19–21		35–42	Report
2 Jul	15:00	Dalhausser–Lucena (United States)	0–2	(Netherlands) Brouwer–Meeuwsen	19–21	15–21		34–42	Report
2 Jul	17:00	Saxton–O'Gorman (Canada)	2–0	(Argentina) Azaad–Capogrosso	21–14	21–19		42–33	Report

=== Pool G ===
Pos	Team	Pld	W	L	Pts	SW	SL	SR	SPW	SPL	SPR	Qualification
1	(Poland) Kantor–Łosiak	3	3	0	6	6	0	MAX	128	98	1.306	Round of 32
2	(United States) Gibb–Ta. Crabb	3	2	1	5	4	2	2.000	120	101	1.188	Round of 32
3	(Uruguay) Vieyto–Cairus	3	1	2	4	2	5	0.400	116	134	0.866	Lucky losers playoffs
4	(Russia) Hudyakov–Velichko	3	0	3	3	1	6	0.167	110	141	0.780	

Date	Time		Score		Set 1	Set 2	Set 3	Total	Report
29 Jun	12:00	Gibb–Ta. Crabb (United States)	2–0	(Uruguay) Vieyto–Cairus	21–17	21–13		42–30	Report
29 Jun	12:00	Kantor–Łosiak (Poland)	2–0	(Russia) Hudyakov–Velichko	21–10	23–21		44–31	Report
30 Jun	17:00	Kantor–Łosiak (Poland)	2–0	(Uruguay) Vieyto–Cairus	21–16	21–15		42–31	Report
30 Jun	18:00	Gibb–Ta. Crabb (United States)	2–0	(Russia) Hudyakov–Velichko	21–15	21–14		42–29	Report
2 Jul	17:00	Gibb–Ta. Crabb (United States)	0–2	(Poland) Kantor–Łosiak	17–21	19–21		36–42	Report
2 Jul	18:00	Hudyakov–Velichko (Russia)	1–2	(Uruguay) Vieyto–Cairus	21–19	16–21	13–15	50–55	Report

=== Pool H ===
Pos	Team	Pld	W	L	Pts	SW	SL	SR	SPW	SPL	SPR	Qualification
1	(Italy) Nicolai–Lupo	3	3	0	6	6	1	6.000	140	100	1.400	Round of 32
2	(Brazil) André–George	3	2	1	5	5	3	1.667	148	134	1.104	Round of 32
3	(Austria) Seidl–Waller	3	1	2	4	3	4	0.750	124	119	1.042	Round of 32
4	(Mozambique) Soares–Nguvo	3	0	3	3	0	6	0.000	67	126	0.532	

Date	Time		Score		Set 1	Set 2	Set 3	Total	Report
29 Jun	19:00	Nicolai–Lupo (Italy)	2–0	(Mozambique) Soares–Nguvo	21–12	21–4		42–16	Report
29 Jun	19:15	André–George (Brazil)	2–1	(Austria) Seidl–Waller	21–19	13–21	16–14	50–54	Report
30 Jun	15:00	Nicolai–Lupo (Italy)	2–0	(Austria) Seidl–Waller	21–15	21–13		42–28	Report
30 Jun	15:00	André–George (Brazil)	2–0	(Mozambique) Soares–Nguvo	21–13	21–11		42–24	Report
3 Jul	12:00	Seidl–Waller (Austria)	2–0	(Mozambique) Soares–Nguvo	21–15	21–12		42–27	Report
3 Jul	14:00	Nicolai–Lupo (Italy)	2–1	(Brazil) André–George	25–23	16–21	15–12	56–56	Report

=== Pool I ===
Pos	Team	Pld	W	L	Pts	SW	SL	SR	SPW	SPL	SPR	Qualification
1	(Brazil) Evandro–Bruno	3	3	0	6	6	1	6.000	142	100	1.420	Round of 32
2	(Spain) Herrera–Gavira	3	2	1	5	4	2	2.000	116	120	0.967	Round of 32
3	(Australia) Durant–Schumann	3	1	2	4	3	4	0.750	131	129	1.016	Lucky losers playoffs
4	(Venezuela) Gómez–Rangel	3	0	3	3	0	6	0.000	91	131	0.695	

Date	Time		Score		Set 1	Set 2	Set 3	Total	Report
29 Jun	14:00	Evandro–Bruno (Brazil)	2–1	(Australia) Durant–Schumann	19–21	21–15	15–13	55–49	Report
29 Jun	15:00	Herrera–Gavira (Spain)	2–0	(Venezuela) Gómez–Rangel	21–17	26–24		47–41	Report
1 Jul	14:00	Herrera–Gavira (Spain)	2–0	(Australia) Durant–Schumann	21–18	21–19		42–37	Report
1 Jul	14:00	Evandro–Bruno (Brazil)	2–0	(Venezuela) Gómez–Rangel	21–9	21–12		42–21	Report
3 Jul	10:00	Herrera–Gavira (Spain)	0–2	(Brazil) Evandro–Bruno	11–21	16–21		27–42	Report
3 Jul	10:00	Durant–Schumann (Australia)	2–0	(Venezuela) Gómez–Rangel	21–10	21–19		42–29	Report

=== Pool J ===
Pos	Team	Pld	W	L	Pts	SW	SL	SR	SPW	SPL	SPR	Qualification
1	(Germany) Ehlers–Flüggen	3	2	1	5	4	2	2.000	121	108	1.120	Round of 32
2	(Russia) Lyamin–Myskiv	3	2	1	5	4	2	2.000	123	112	1.098	Round of 32
3	(Mexico) Ontiveros–Virgen	3	1	2	4	3	4	0.750	122	129	0.946	Lucky losers playoffs
4	(Chile) M. Grimalt–E. Grimalt	3	1	2	4	2	5	0.400	110	127	0.866	

Date	Time		Score		Set 1	Set 2	Set 3	Total	Report
29 Jun	18:00	M. Grimalt–E. Grimalt (Chile)	0–2	(Germany) Ehlers–Flüggen	17–21	14–21		31–42	Report
29 Jun	18:00	Lyamin–Myskiv (Russia)	0–2	(Mexico) Ontiveros–Virgen	18–21	21–23		39–44	Report
1 Jul	17:00	Lyamin–Myskiv (Russia)	2–0	(Germany) Ehlers–Flüggen	21–17	21–19		42–36	Report
1 Jul	18:00	M. Grimalt–E. Grimalt (Chile)	2–1	(Mexico) Ontiveros–Virgen	21–12	11–21	15–10	47–43	Report
3 Jul	13:00	M. Grimalt–E. Grimalt (Chile)	0–2	(Russia) Lyamin–Myskiv	19–21	13–21		32–42	Report
3 Jul	13:00	Ontiveros–Virgen (Mexico)	0–2	(Germany) Ehlers–Flüggen	20–22	15–21		35–43	Report

=== Pool K ===
Pos	Team	Pld	W	L	Pts	SW	SL	SR	SPW	SPL	SPR	Qualification
1	(Switzerland) Heidrich–Gerson	3	2	1	5	4	2	2.000	126	110	1.145	Round of 32
2	(Latvia) Samoilovs–Šmēdiņš	3	2	1	5	4	2	2.000	129	117	1.103	Round of 32
3	(Canada) Pedlow–Schachter	3	2	1	5	4	2	2.000	124	115	1.078	Round of 32
4	(Chile) Zavala–Lammel	3	0	3	3	0	6	0.000	89	126	0.706	

Date	Time		Score		Set 1	Set 2	Set 3	Total	Report
29 Jun	13:00	Samoilovs–Šmēdiņš (Latvia)	2–0	(Chile) Zavala–Lammel	21–15	21–15		42–30	Report
29 Jun	14:00	Pedlow–Schachter (Canada)	0–2	(Switzerland) Heidrich–Gerson	19–21	18–21		37–42	Report
1 Jul	10:00	Samoilovs–Šmēdiņš (Latvia)	2–0	(Switzerland) Heidrich–Gerson	21–19	25–23		46–42	Report
1 Jul	10:00	Pedlow–Schachter (Canada)	2–0	(Chile) Zavala–Lammel	21–17	21–15		42–32	Report
3 Jul	11:00	Samoilovs–Šmēdiņš (Latvia)	0–2	(Canada) Pedlow–Schachter	19–21	22–24		41–45	Report
3 Jul	11:00	Heidrich–Gerson (Switzerland)	2–0	(Chile) Zavala–Lammel	21–16	21–11		42–27	Report

=== Pool L ===
Pos	Team	Pld	W	L	Pts	SW	SL	SR	SPW	SPL	SPR	Qualification
1	(Germany) Thole–Wickler	3	3	0	6	6	0	MAX	127	96	1.323	Round of 32
2	(United States) Bourne–Tr. Crabb	3	2	1	5	4	3	1.333	124	110	1.127	Round of 32
3	(Iran) Salemi–Vakili	3	1	2	4	3	4	0.750	126	113	1.115	Round of 32
4	(Rwanda) Kavalo–Ntagengwa	3	0	3	3	0	6	0.000	68	126	0.540	

Date	Time		Score		Set 1	Set 2	Set 3	Total	Report
29 Jun	13:00	Thole–Wickler (Germany)	2–0	(Rwanda) Kavalo–Ntagengwa	21–10	21–15		42–25	Report
29 Jun	13:00	Bourne–Tr. Crabb (United States)	2–1	(Iran) Salemi–Vakili	13–21	21–16	15–9	49–46	Report
1 Jul	15:00	Thole–Wickler (Germany)	2–0	(Iran) Salemi–Vakili	21–18	22–20		43–38	Report
1 Jul	15:00	Bourne–Tr. Crabb (United States)	2–0	(Rwanda) Kavalo–Ntagengwa	21–13	21–9		42–22	Report
2 Jul	18:00	Thole–Wickler (Germany)	2–0	(United States) Bourne–Tr. Crabb	21–16	21–17		42–33	Report
2 Jul	18:00	Salemi–Vakili (Iran)	2–0	(Rwanda) Kavalo–Ntagengwa	21–10	21–11		42–21	Report

=== Ranking of the third place teams ===
The four best third-placed teams advanced directly to the round of 32. The other eight third-placed teams will play in the lucky losers playoffs for the additional four spots in the Round of 32.

Pos	Team	Pld	W	L	Pts	SW	SL	SR	SPW	SPL	SPR
1	(Canada) Pedlow–Schachter	3	2	1	5	4	2	2.000	124	115	1.078
2	(Iran) Salemi–Vakili	3	1	2	4	3	4	0.750	126	113	1.115
3	(Russia) Semenov–Leshukov	3	1	2	4	3	4	0.750	143	131	1.092
4	(Austria) Seidl–Waller	3	1	2	4	3	4	0.750	124	119	1.042
5	(Australia) Durant–Schumann	3	1	2	4	3	4	0.750	131	129	1.016
6	(Czech Republic) Perušič–Schweiner	3	1	2	4	3	4	0.750	130	129	1.008
7	(Germany) Bergmann–Harms	3	1	2	4	3	4	0.750	124	126	0.984
8	(Mexico) Ontiveros–Virgen	3	1	2	4	3	4	0.750	122	129	0.946
9	(United States) Dalhausser–Lucena	3	1	2	4	2	4	0.500	111	111	1.000
10	(Italy) Ranghieri–Caminati	3	1	2	4	2	4	0.500	109	116	0.940
11	(Germany) Erdmann–Winter	3	1	2	4	2	4	0.500	111	123	0.902
12	(Uruguay) Vieyto–Cairus	3	1	2	4	2	5	0.400	116	134	0.866

== Lucky losers playoffs ==
Date	Time		Score		Set 1	Set 2	Set 3	Total	Report
3 Jul	19:00	Durant–Schumann (Australia)	2–1	(Uruguay) Vieyto–Cairus	21–23	21–19	15–11	57–53	Report
3 Jul	19:00	Ontiveros–Virgen (Mexico)	0–2	(United States) Dalhausser–Lucena	15–21	17–21		32–42	Report
3 Jul	19:15	Bergmann–Harms (Germany)	2–0	(Italy) Ranghieri–Caminati	21–19	21–16		42–35	Report
3 Jul	20:30	Perušič–Schweiner (Czech Republic)	2–0	(Germany) Erdmann–Winter	26–24	21–14		47–38	Report

== Knockout stage ==
=== Bracket ===
Round of 32
4 July
Mol–Sørum (NOR)	2
Bergmann–Harms (GER)	0
4 July
Solberg–Felipe (BRA)	0
Pļaviņš–Tocs (LAT)	2
4 July
Evandro–Bruno (BRA)	0
Allen–Slick (USA)	2
4 July
Salemi–Vakili (IRN)	1
Nicolai–Lupo (ITA)	2
4 July
Alison–Filho (BRA)	2
Pedlow–Schachter (CAN)	0
4 July
Brouwer–Meeuwsen (NED)	0
Thole–Wickler (GER)	2
4 July
Lyamin–Myskiv (RUS)	2
Doppler–Horst (AUT)	1
4 July
Dalhausser–Lucena (USA)	2
Younousse–Tijan (QAT)	0
4 July
Stoyanovskiy–Krasilnikov (RUS)	2
Perušič–Schweiner (CZE)	0
4 July
Gibb–Ta. Crabb (USA)	2
Herrera–Gavira (ESP)	0
4 July
Heidrich–Gerson (SUI)	0
Carambula–Rossi (ITA)	2
4 July
Seidl–Waller (AUT)	2
Saxton–O'Gorman (CAN)	1
4 July
Kantor–Łosiak (POL)	0
Semenov–Leshukov (RUS)	2
4 July
Bourne–Tr. Crabb (USA)	2
Ehlers–Flüggen (GER)	1
4 July
Samoilovs–Šmēdiņš (LAT)	1
André–George (BRA)	2
4 July
Durant–Schumann (AUS)	0
Fijałek–Bryl (POL)	2

Round of 16
5 July
Mol–Sørum (NOR)	2
Pļaviņš–Tocs (LAT)	0
5 July
Allen–Slick (USA)	1
Nicolai–Lupo (ITA)	2
5 July
Alison–Filho (BRA)	0
Thole–Wickler (GER)	2
5 July
Lyamin–Myskiv (RUS)	0
Dalhausser–Lucena (USA)	2
5 July
Stoyanovskiy–Krasilnikov (RUS)	2
Gibb–Ta. Crabb (USA)	0
5 July
Carambula–Rossi (ITA)	2
Seidl–Waller (AUT)	0
5 July
Semenov–Leshukov (RUS)	0
Bourne–Tr. Crabb (USA)	2
5 July
André–George (BRA)	2
Fijałek–Bryl (POL)	1

Quarter-finals
6 July
Mol–Sørum (NOR)	2
Nicolai–Lupo (ITA)	0
6 July
Thole–Wickler (GER)	2
Dalhausser–Lucena (USA)	0
6 July
Stoyanovskiy–Krasilnikov (RUS)	2
Carambula–Rossi (ITA)	0
6 July
Bourne–Tr. Crabb (USA)	2
André–George (BRA)	1

Semi-finals
6 July
Mol–Sørum (NOR)	1
Thole–Wickler (GER)	2
6 July
Stoyanovskiy–Krasilnikov (RUS)	2
Bourne–Tr. Crabb (USA)	1

Final
7 July
Thole–Wickler (GER)	1
Stoyanovskiy–Krasilnikov (RUS)	2
Bronze medal match
7 July
Mol–Sørum (NOR)	2
Bourne–Tr. Crabb (USA)	1

=== Round of 32 ===
Date	Time		Score		Set 1	Set 2	Set 3	Total	Report
4 Jul	11:00	Evandro–Bruno (Brazil)	0–2	(United States) Allen–Slick	19–21	18–21		37–42	Report
4 Jul	11:00	Salemi–Vakili (Iran)	1–2	(Italy) Nicolai–Lupo	16–21	21–16	7–15	44–52	Report
4 Jul	12:00	Heidrich–Gerson (Switzerland)	0–2	(Italy) Carambula–Rossi	11–21	13–21		24–42	Report
4 Jul	12:00	Seidl–Waller (Austria)	2–1	(Canada) Saxton–O'Gorman	22–24	21–15	15–8	58–47	Report
4 Jul	13:00	Samoilovs–Šmēdiņš (Latvia)	1–2	(Brazil) André–George	21–17	15–21	15–17	51–55	Report
4 Jul	14:00	Durant–Schumann (Australia)	0–2	(Poland) Fijałek–Bryl	16–21	19–21		35–42	Report
4 Jul	15:00	Mol–Sørum (Norway)	2–0	(Germany) Bergmann–Harms	21–13	21–13		42–26	Report
4 Jul	15:00	Solberg–Felipe (Brazil)	0–2	(Latvia) Pļaviņš–Tocs	19–21	18–21		37–42	Report
4 Jul	15:00	Stoyanovskiy–Krasilnikov (Russia)	2–0	(Czech Republic) Perušič–Schweiner	21–13	29–27		50–40	Report
4 Jul	16:00	Gibb–Ta. Crabb (United States)	2–0	(Spain) Herrera–Gavira	21–16	21–17		42–33	Report
4 Jul	17:00	Lyamin–Myskiv (Russia)	2–1	(Austria) Doppler–Horst	21–14	15–21	16–14	52–49	Report
4 Jul	17:00	Kantor–Łosiak (Poland)	0–2	(Russia) Semenov–Leshukov	13–21	17–21		30–42	Report
4 Jul	17:00	Bourne–Tr. Crabb (United States)	2–1	(Germany) Ehlers–Flüggen	15–21	21–19	15–10	51–50	Report
4 Jul	18:00	Alison–Filho (Brazil)	2–0	(Canada) Pedlow–Schachter	21–18	21–14		42–32	Report
4 Jul	18:00	Dalhausser–Lucena (United States)	2–0	(Qatar) Younousse–Tijan	21–18	21–15		42–33	Report
4 Jul	19:15	Brouwer–Meeuwsen (Netherlands)	0–2	(Germany) Thole–Wickler	21–23	19–21		40–44	Report

=== Round of 16 ===
Date	Time		Score		Set 1	Set 2	Set 3	Total	Report
5 Jul	13:45	Stoyanovskiy–Krasilnikov (Russia)	2–0	(United States) Gibb–Ta. Crabb	21–13	21–18		42–31	Report
5 Jul	13:45	André–George (Brazil)	2–1	(Poland) Fijałek–Bryl	21–16	15–21	15–11	51–48	Report
5 Jul	15:00	Carambula–Rossi (Italy)	2–0	(Austria) Seidl–Waller	21–18	21–15		42–33	Report
5 Jul	15:00	Semenov–Leshukov (Russia)	0–2	(United States) Bourne–Tr. Crabb	18–21	18–21		36–42	Report
5 Jul	16:45	Mol–Sørum (Norway)	2–0	(Latvia) Pļaviņš–Tocs	22–20	21–17		43–37	Report
5 Jul	16:45	Allen–Slick (United States)	1–2	(Italy) Nicolai–Lupo	25–27	21–18	13–15	59–60	Report
5 Jul	18:00	Alison–Filho (Brazil)	0–2	(Germany) Thole–Wickler	14–21	15–21		29–42	Report
5 Jul	18:00	Lyamin–Myskiv (Russia)	0–2	(United States) Dalhausser–Lucena	15–21	17–21		32–42	Report

=== Quarterfinals ===
Date	Time		Score		Set 1	Set 2	Set 3	Total	Report
6 Jul	10:30	Mol–Sørum (Norway)	2–0	(Italy) Nicolai–Lupo	21–13	21–11		42–24	Report
6 Jul	10:30	Bourne–Tr. Crabb (United States)	2–1	(Brazil) André–George	16–21	21–15	17–15	54–51	Report
6 Jul	11:45	Thole–Wickler (Germany)	2–0	(United States) Dalhausser–Lucena	21–18	21–17		42–35	Report
6 Jul	11:45	Stoyanovskiy–Krasilnikov (Russia)	2–0	(Italy) Carambula–Rossi	21–16	21–16		42–32	Report

=== Semifinals ===
Date	Time		Score		Set 1	Set 2	Set 3	Total	Report
6 Jul	17:00	Stoyanovskiy–Krasilnikov (Russia)	2–1	(United States) Bourne–Tr. Crabb	21–13	19–21	15–11	55–45	Report
6 Jul	18:30	Mol–Sørum (Norway)	1–2	(Germany) Thole–Wickler	21–17	16–21	12–15	49–53	Report

=== Bronze medal game ===
Date	Time		Score		Set 1	Set 2	Set 3	Total	Report
7 Jul	12:30	Mol–Sørum (Norway)	2–1	(United States) Bourne–Tr. Crabb	19–21	21–15	15–10	55–46	Report

=== Final ===
Date	Time		Score		Set 1	Set 2	Set 3	Total	Report
7 Jul	14:00	Thole–Wickler (Germany)	1–2	(Russia) Stoyanovskiy–Krasilnikov	21–19	17–21	11–15	49–55	Report

== See also ==
- 2019 Beach Volleyball World Championships – Women's tournament
