= Oleg Stoyanovskiy =

Russian beach volleyball player

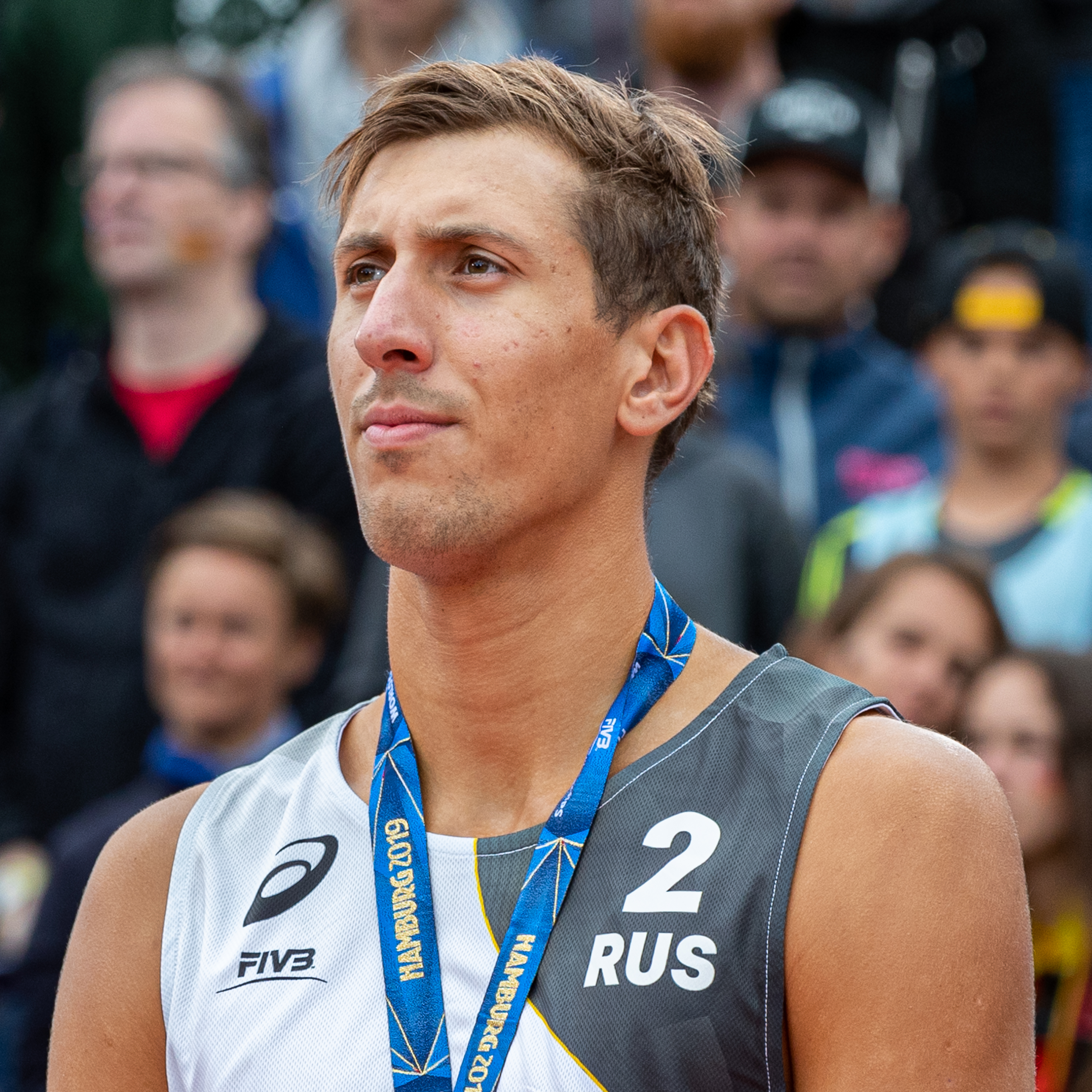
- Stoyanovskiy in 2019

Personal information
- Full name: Oleg Vladislavovich Stoyanovskiy
- Nationality: Russian
- Born: 26 September 1996 (age 30); Moscow, Russia
- Height: 2.07 m (6 ft 9 in)
- Weight: 95 kg (209 lb)

Beach volleyball information

Current teammate
Years	Teammate
2018–	Viacheslav Krasilnikov

Previous teammates
Years	Teammate
2014–2017; 2018	Artem Yarzutkin; Igor Velichko

Best results
Years	Location	Result
2020; 2019; 2019; 2019; 2019; 2018; 2018; 2018; 2018; 2018	CEV European Championship; World Tour finals World Championship; Xiamen Open; The Hague Open; Las Vegas Open; Yangzhou Open; Moscow Open; Xiamen Open; Doha Open	2nd 1st 1st 1st 1st 3rd 2nd 3rd 1st 2nd
Honours
Men's Beach Volleyball
Representing (Russia) ROC
Olympic Games
Silver medal – second place	2020 Tokyo	Beach
Representing Russia
World Championships
Gold medal – first place	2019 Hamburg	Beach
European Championships
Silver medal – second place	2020 Jūrmala	Beach

Oleg Vladislavovich Stoyanovskiy (Russian: Олег Владиславович Стояновский, IPA: [ɐˈlʲek stə(j)ɪˈnofskʲɪj]; born 26 September 1996) is a Russian beach volleyball player.

He and Viacheslav Krasilnikov won 2019 Beach Volleyball World Championships in Hamburg, defeating Julius Thole and Clemens Wickler of Germany. Stoyanovskiy also became the youngest world champion, at 22 years, 9 months, and 11 days.
