= Taylor Crabb =

American beach volleyball player

Personal information
- Born: January 26, 1992 (age 34) Honolulu, Hawaii, U.S.
- Home town: Hermosa Beach, California
- Height: 6 ft 0 in (1.85 m) (Note: His height is listed as 6 ft 0 in by the Association of Volleyball Professionals and the United States Olympic Committee, and as 1.85 m by the Beach Volleyball Major Series and the Fédération Internationale de Volleyball.)
- Website: www.taylorcrabb.com

Sport
- Country: United States
- Sport: Beach volleyball
- Position: Left side/defender
- College team: Long Beach State (CSULB)
- Partner: Taylor Sander (2021–present)
- Former partners: Jake Gibb (2017-21); Trevor Crabb (2011–16)
- Coached by: Richard Lambourne
Medal record
Men's beach volleyball
Representing the United States
World Tour
Gold medal – first place	2020 Chetumal	Beach
Bronze medal – third place	2021 Doha	Beach
Bronze medal – third place	2022 Dubai	Beach

Taylor Crabb (born January 26, 1992) is an American beach volleyball player who plays as a left-side defender with his partner Taylor Sander. He has won fourteen tournaments on the AVP Pro Tour and one gold medal on the FIVB World Tour.

Growing up in Hawaii in a volleyball-playing family, the sport was a big part of Crabb's childhood. He was a standout college an indoor volleyball player for the Long Beach State 49ers, and was the 2013 collegiate National Player of the Year. Upon graduating in 2014, he spent one season playing in the Pro A indoor volleyball league before leaving to focus on beach volleyball. For the next two years, he had limited success playing with his brother Trevor on the domestic AVP Pro Tour and the international FIVB World Tour. He split from Trevor to team up with Gibb at the end of 2016. In their third season together, Crabb and Gibb won their first World Tour title and entered the top ten of the world rankings. Crabb and Gibb were one of two United States men's beach volleyball teams that qualified for the 2020 Summer Olympics. However, despite being vaccinated and symptom-free, Crabb tested positive for COVID-19 upon arriving in Tokyo. As a result, Crabb was replaced by Tri Bourne at the tournament.

An undersized volleyball player, Crabb has been noted for his speed and knowledge of the sport. He won the 2018 and 2019 AVP most valuable player award.

== Early life and junior years ==
Crabb was born on January 26, 1992, in Honolulu, Hawaii, and hails from a sporting family. His father Chris was a professional indoor volleyball player, while his mother Paula was on the Southern Connecticut State University gymnastics team. His uncle Tony served as an assistant coach for the 1984 Olympic-gold-medal-winning United States men's national volleyball team, and his cousin Lindsey Berg is a two-time Olympic silver medalist with the United States women's national volleyball team. His brother Trevor, three years his senior, played NCAA Division I (D-I) indoor volleyball for the Long Beach State 49ers.

Volleyball was a big part of Crabb's childhood and he has "been playing since [he] could walk." He grew up playing two-on-two beach volleyball with his father and older brothers. From 2004 to 2010, Crabb played club an indoor volleyball in the youth ranks of the Outrigger Canoe Club; his club came in second at the 2010 USA Volleyball Junior National Championships in the 18s Open division. Crabb also played high school an indoor volleyball for Punahou School. In his senior year, Punahou completed an undefeated season by winning the state championship, with Crabb named as the tournament's Most Outstanding Player.

=== International ===
Crabb was a member of the United States national under-19 squad that finished tenth at the 2009 U19 World Championship. The following year, he was called up to the under-21 national team for the 2010 Men's Junior NORCECA Volleyball Championship. The United States beat Canada in three straight sets in the finals to win the gold medal, and Crabb was named the Best Spiker of the tournament. Crabb went on to captain the 12-man under-21 national team that competed at the 2011 U21 World Championship in Rio de Janeiro, Brazil. The United States finished fourth following losses to Argentina in the semifinals and Serbia in the bronze-medal match. By the end of the tournament, Crabb had scored a total of 75 points (23rd out of 85 players), posting a 0.34 kill percentage (17th out of 85 players) and averaging 1.58 digs per set (19th out of 94 players).

== College ==
Crabb turned down offers from other top D-I indoor volleyball programs to join his brother Trevor at Long Beach State, joining the 49ers in the 2010–11 season as an outside hitter. Crabb played in 29 matches (23 as a starter) in his freshman year, amassing 296 kills, while averaging 2.6 kills and 1.38 digs per set. He recorded a team-best 303 kills in his sophomore year, averaging 2.75 kills and 1.91 digs per set. In his junior year, Crabb posted the most number of kills in the NCAA at 502, and averaged 4.18 kills per set (fourth in the NCAA) with a .353 hitting percentage (eighth in the NCAA). He led the 49ers to their first Mountain Pacific Sports Federation (MPSF) conference finals in seven years, where they lost to the BYU Cougars. At the end of the 2012–13 season, Crabb was selected to the first team All-American and was voted National Player of the Year by the American Volleyball Coaches Association (AVCA). As a senior, Crabb made the first team All-American once again, finishing his final collegiate season with 499 kills, with an average of 4.8 kills per set (first in the NCAA) and a hitting percentage of .371 (21st in the NCAA). Crabb graduated with a Bachelor's degree in American studies in 2014.

== Career ==
=== 2011–2015: Early years ===
While still in college, Crabb partnered with his brother Trevor to compete as an amateur on the domestic beach volleyball circuits. His first professional result was a 49th place at a tournament in Hermosa Beach, California, in 2011. He made his Association of Volleyball Professionals (AVP) debut two years later at the 2013 Manhattan Beach Open, where he and Trevor came through the qualifiers and faced the top-seeded Phil Dalhausser and Sean Rosenthal in the first round of the double-elimination main draw. The brothers pushed the No. 1 seeds to a tiebreaker set, losing with a score of 21–19, 12–21, 9–15, and eventually finished the tournament tied for 25th.

Upon graduating from Long Beach State in 2014, Crabb signed with Arago de Sète to play professional indoor volleyball in the French Pro A league. Sète ended the 2014–15 regular season ranked 6th out of the 14 Pro A clubs, (Note: Under Rechercher un classement [Search a ranking], select Journée 26 [Day 26] and Saison 2014/2015 [Season 2014/2015]. Click Go.) with Crabb contributing mostly as a substitute outside hitter. The club advanced to the championship playoffs where they were eliminated by Tours VB in the quarterfinals. (Note: Under Rechercher un résultat [search a result], select Playoff and Saison 2014/2015 [Season 2014/2015]. Click Go.) In the second leg of the quarterfinals, Crabb scored two points as a substitute in the second set of his team's three-set loss.

=== 2015: Transition to beach ===
In the summer of 2015, Crabb quit indoor to play beach volleyball full-time. He teamed up with Spencer McLachlin for his first three AVP events; the pair did not place higher than 13th. He played with Trevor for the remainder of the AVP season and their best results were two third-place finishes. Seeded 13th at the $100K Manhattan Beach Open in August, the duo upset three of the top-ten seeds on their way to the final four—including a 29–31, 21–17, 16–14 victory over the top-seeded Jake Gibb and Casey Patterson—before falling to the third-seeded Dalhausser and Nick Lucena. They entered the double-elimination $100K Huntington Beach Championships the following month as the No. 7 seeds. Despite a second-round loss to the second-seeded Ryan Doherty and John Mayer, Crabb and Trevor won three consecutive matches in the losers bracket to reach the semifinals where they were defeated once again by Doherty and Mayer. By the end of his first full season on the AVP, Crabb had set a season-best 5.4 digs per set with 313 digs in total.

Crabb and Trevor also debuted on the FIVB World Tour at the $75K Xiamen Open in September. They defeated a team from China in the qualifying round to advance to Crabb's first World Tour main draw where they were seeded 29th. Despite losing two of their three group stage matches in the main draw, they progressed to the knockout stage with an upset over Poland's fourth-seeded Michał Kądzioła and Jakub Szałankiewicz. A subsequent loss to Latvia's No. 1 seeds of Aleksandrs Samoilovs and Jānis Šmēdiņš in the Round of 16 saw them exit from the competition in ninth place. Crabb won his first international tournament with Trevor the next month at the $8K NORCECA tournament in Saint Lucia. Having only played two international events, Crabb concluded the year ranked No. 136 in the world with Trevor.

=== 2016: Breakthrough ===
2016 was a breakthrough year for Crabb, highlighted by two more NORCECA titles and three AVP finals appearances. Overall, he and Trevor finished in the top-three of all seven AVP tournaments they entered, notching victories against top domestic teams including Doherty and Mayer, and Gibb and Patterson. Crabb set the season-best 480 digs, over 100 more digs than the next-highest defender. On the World Tour, the pair competed in their first Major series event at the $400K Gstaad Major. They came through the qualifiers to reach the Round of 16 as the No. 25 seeds, including an upset over the tenth-seeded Clemens Doppler and Alexander Horst of Austria, before falling to their fifth-seeded compatriots Gibb and Patterson. Crabb and Trevor did not manage better than ninth at the next two Majors either, and they ended the year with an improved world ranking of No. 47.

=== 2017–2018: Partnering with Gibb ===
At the end of 2016, Crabb ended his partnership with Trevor to team up with three-time Olympian Jake Gibb. Crabb and Gibb went into the 2017 AVP season as the top seeds, winning two of the six events they competed in. They won their first tournament together at the $87.5K New York City Open in June without dropping a set. The following month, the double-elimination $79K Hermosa Beach Open saw Crabb play against his brother Trevor on the AVP for the first time. Crabb and Gibb defeated Trevor and his new partner Rosenthal in the fourth round of the winners bracket, they then faced Trevor and Rosenthal once more in the finals, beating them in three sets for Crabb's second AVP title. Crabb and Gibb also competed in six events on the World Tour; their best results were three fifth-place finishes. In July, they competed in Crabb's first World Championships as the No. 18 seeds, posting two wins and two losses to tie for 17th. They closed out their first season as teammates ranked 24th in the world.

Crabb and Gibb had a slow start to 2018. On the World Tour, they recorded upsets over top-ranked teams including the reigning World Champions Evandro Oliveira and André Stein, but did not progress beyond the Round of 16 in their first six events. They were further setback when Gibb missed the start of the AVP season with a broken toe. Despite Gibb's injury, the pair won two of the seven AVP events they entered that year. Their first victory came at the $75K Seattle Open in June, in which they upset the No. 1 seeds of Dalhausser and Nick Lucena for the title. They went on to win the season-ending $125K Chicago Championships, defeating Tim Bomgren and Chaim Schalk in the championship match. Crabb was also the runner-up in three AVP events, losing to Dalhausser and Lucena in the final match each time. Their international results also improved mid-season where as the No. 21 seeds at the $300K Gstaad Major, they advanced to Crabb's first final four on the World Tour. In the semifinals, they lost the tiebreaker set to the 15th-seeded Anders Mol and Christian Sørum of Norway. In the bronze-medal match, they lost another three-setter, this time to the 12th-seeded Daniele Lupo and Paolo Nicolai of Italy, who they had beaten earlier in the group stage. They closed out 2018 with two more quarterfinals appearances and were ranked No. 11 in the world rankings.

=== 2019–present: First World Tour title ===
In the third year of their partnership, Crabb and Gibb won four of the six AVP events they entered. They started the season as the No. 1 seeds, defeating the teams of Chase Budinger and Casey Patterson, and Jeremy Casebeer and Chaim Schalk in the finals of the $100K Huntington Beach Open and $75K Austin Open respectively. The pair went on to win the $150K Chicago Championships in August as the No. 2 seeds, recording a two-set victory over the top-seeded Dalhausser and Lucena in the final match. Crabb and Gibb ended the 2019 AVP season beating Theo Brunner and John Hyden at the $100K Hawaii Open, rallying from a first set loss to win 18–21, 22–20, 17–15. On the World Tour, the duo began the 2019 season with a fifth-place finish at the $75K Sydney Open in March, and did not place higher than ninth in their next seven tournaments. They entered the World Tour Finals in September as the No. 17 seeds. In the group stage, they upset Germany's 16th-seeded Nils Ehlers and Lars Flüggen, and Italy's top-seeded Lupo and Nicolai to advance to the knockout rounds. They eventually lost to the fifth-seeded Julius Thole and Clemens Wickler of Germany in the semifinals, and then to the second-seeded Mol and Sørum of Norway in the bronze-medal match. Crabb and Gibb ended the international season winning their first World Tour title at the $150K Chetumal Open in November. As the No. 3 seeds, they upset the Polish No. 2 seeds of Michal Bryl and Grzegorz Fijałek on their way to the gold-medal match, where they beat the top-seeded Dutch team of Alexander Brouwer and Robert Meeuwsen in three sets. Crabb and Gibb concluded the year ranked eighth in the world. They were scheduled to play together at the 2020 Summer Olympics, but Crabb tested positive for COVID-19 and had to withdraw from the beach volleyball competition.

== Style of play ==
Crabb is a defender and a right-handed left-side player. At 6 ft 0 in (1.85 m), he is considered an undersized volleyball player. His collegiate coach Alan Knipe said that Crabb made up for his shorter stature with his 40 inch (100 cm) vertical jump, versatility and knowledge of the sport. On the beach, Crabb has been noted for his speed, while his teammate Gibb has praised his court coverage and understanding of beach volleyball. According to Crabb, he "take[s] a lot of pride" in chasing down balls and making digs. He has also noted that growing up as a smaller player turned out to be an advantage as it allowed him to play in a variety of indoor volleyball positions, which in turn made his game more well-rounded. Volleyball Magazine hailed Crabb as one of the best defenders in the world in 2018. He is known for his calm demeanor on court, which he credits to his father's influence.

Of the 74 players who competed in a Major Series main draw on the 2019 World Tour, Crabb ranked 37th for total points scored, averaging 5.37 points per set; and 26th for total kills, averaging 5.31 kills per set.

== Personal life ==
Crabb's middle name is Kikaha o Ke Kai, which means "glide over the ocean" in Hawaiian; it was given to him because his mother had participated in a 46-mile canoe race while pregnant with him. Since they were young, Crabb has had a very competitive relationship with his brother Trevor.

== Awards ==
- 2013 – AVCA National Player of the Year
- 2015 – AVP Newcomer of the Year
- 2016 – AVP Best Defender
- 2017 – AVP Best Defender
- 2018 – AVP Best Defender, AVP Most Valuable Player, AVP Men's Team of the Year (with Gibb)
- 2019 – AVP Best Defender, AVP Most Valuable Player, AVP Men's Team of the Year (with Gibb)
