= Viacheslav Krasilnikov =

Russian beach volleyball player (born 1991)

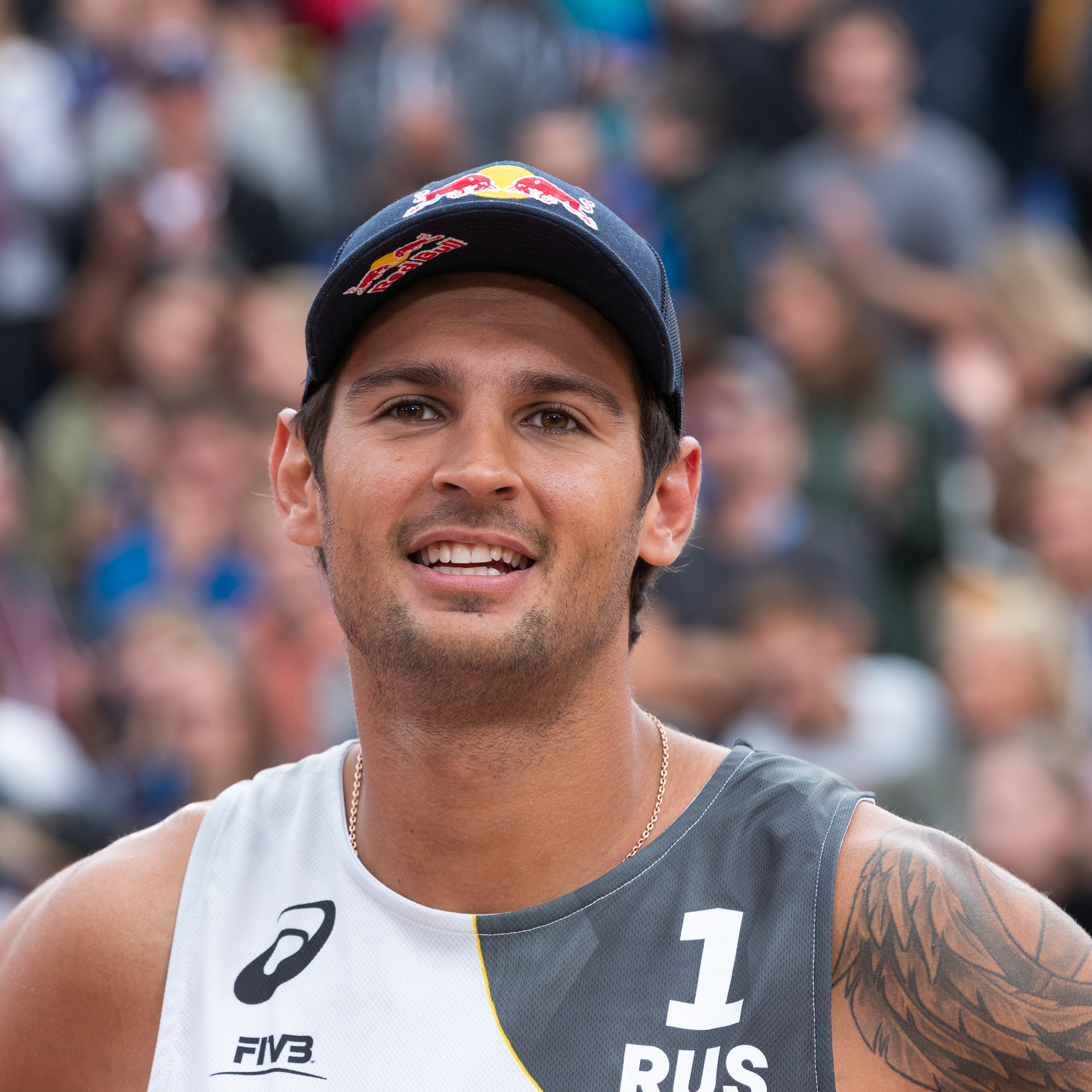
- Krasilnikov in 2019

Personal information
- Full name: Viacheslav Borisovich Krasilnikov
- Nationality: Russian
- Born: 28 April 1991 (age 35) Gelendzhik, Krasnodar Krai, RSFSR, USSR (now Russia)
- Height: 1.96 m (6 ft 5 in)
- Weight: 90 kg (198 lb)
Beach volleyball information
Current teammate
- Years: Teammate
- 2018–: Oleg Stoyanovskiy
Previous teammates
- Years: Teammate
- 2013–2016 2017–2018: Konstantin Semenov; Nikita Lyamin
Honours
Men's beach volleyball
Representing (Russia) ROC
Olympic Games
Silver medal – second place	2020 Tokyo	Beach
Representing Russia
World Championships
Gold medal – first place	2019 Hamburg	Beach
Bronze medal – third place	2017 Vienna	Beach
European Championships
Silver medal – second place	2016 Biel/Bienne	Beach
Silver medal – second place	2020 Jūrmala	Beach

Viacheslav Borisovich Krasilnikov (Russian: Вячеслав Борисович Красильников, IPA: [vʲɪtɕɪˈslaf krɐˈsʲilʲnʲɪkəf]; born 28 April 1991) is a Russian beach volleyball player.

Krassilnikov finished fifth in the 2009 World Youth Championship in Alanya with Artyom Kucherenko. In 2012, he played his first Grand Slam on the World Tour with Ruslan Bykanov in Moscow. He competed at the 2016 Summer Olympics in Rio de Janeiro, in the men's beach volleyball tournament. There, Krasilnikov paired with Konstantin Semenov, finishing as fourth. With Oleg Stoyanovskiy he won the men's gold medal at 2019 Beach Volleyball World Championships

== Sporting achievements ==
=== FIVB Beach Volleyball World Championships ===
- 2017 with Nikita Lyamin
- 2019 with Oleg Stoyanovskiy

=== European Beach Volleyball Championships ===
- 2016 with Konstantin Semenov
- 2020 with Oleg Stoyanovskiy

=== National championships ===
- 2013 Russian Championship, with Ruslan Bykanov
- 2015 Russian Championship, with Ruslan Bykanov
- 2018 Russian Championship, with Nikita Lyamin
- 2020 Russian Championship, with Oleg Stoyanovskiy

=== World Cup events ===
- 2017 The Hague, Kish Island (with Nikita Lyamin)
- 2019 The Hague, Xiamen, World Tour Finals (with Oleg Stoyanovskiy)
