= Ilya Leshukov =

Russian beach volleyball player (born 1995)

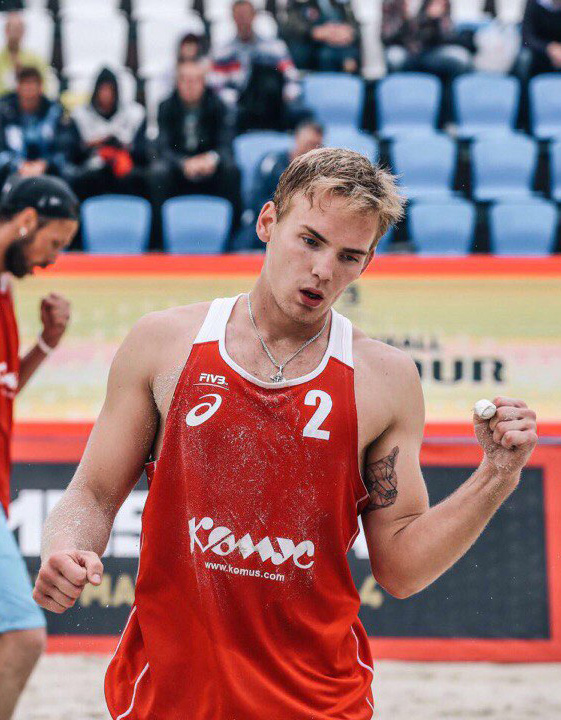
- Lekushov in Moscow, 2017

Personal information
- Full name: Ilya Sergeyevich Leshukov
- Nationality: Russian
- Born: 27 December 1995 (age 30); Yekaterinburg, Russia
- Height: 1.94 m (6 ft 4 in)
- Weight: 87 kg (192 lb)

Beach volleyball information

Current teammate
Years	Teammate
2018–present	Konstantin Semenov

Previous teammates
Years	Teammate
2013; 2014; 2014; 2014; 2014–2015; 2015–2017; 2016; 2018	Vasili Andrianov; Serguei Prokopiev; Ivan Golovin; Pavel Karpukhin; Alexander Margiev; Alexander Likholetov; Nikita Liamin; Vasilii Ivanov

Best results
Years	Location	Result
2021; 2019; 2019; 2019; 2018; 2018	Cancun Open - 2nd event CEV European Championship; Warsaw Open; The Hague Open; Yangzhou Open; Ostrava Open	2nd 2nd 3rd 3rd 1st 3rd
Medal record
Men's beach volleyball
Representing Russia
FIVB Beach Volleyball World Tour
Gold medal – first place	2018	Yangzhou Open
Silver medal – second place	2021	Cancun Hub
Bronze medal – third place	2018	Ostrava Open
Bronze medal – third place	2019	Warsaw Open
Bronze medal – third place	2019	The Hague Open
European Championship
Silver medal – second place	2019 Moscow	Beach
U21 World Championships
Silver medal – second place	2014 Lamaca	Beach

Ilya Sergeyevich Leshukov (Russian: Илья Сергеевич Лешуков; born 27 December 1995) is a Russian beach volleyball player. As of 2018, he plays with Konstantin Semenov. They qualified for 2020 Summer Olympics in Tokyo.
