= Álvaro Morais Filho =

Brazilian beach volleyball player

Álvaro Filho
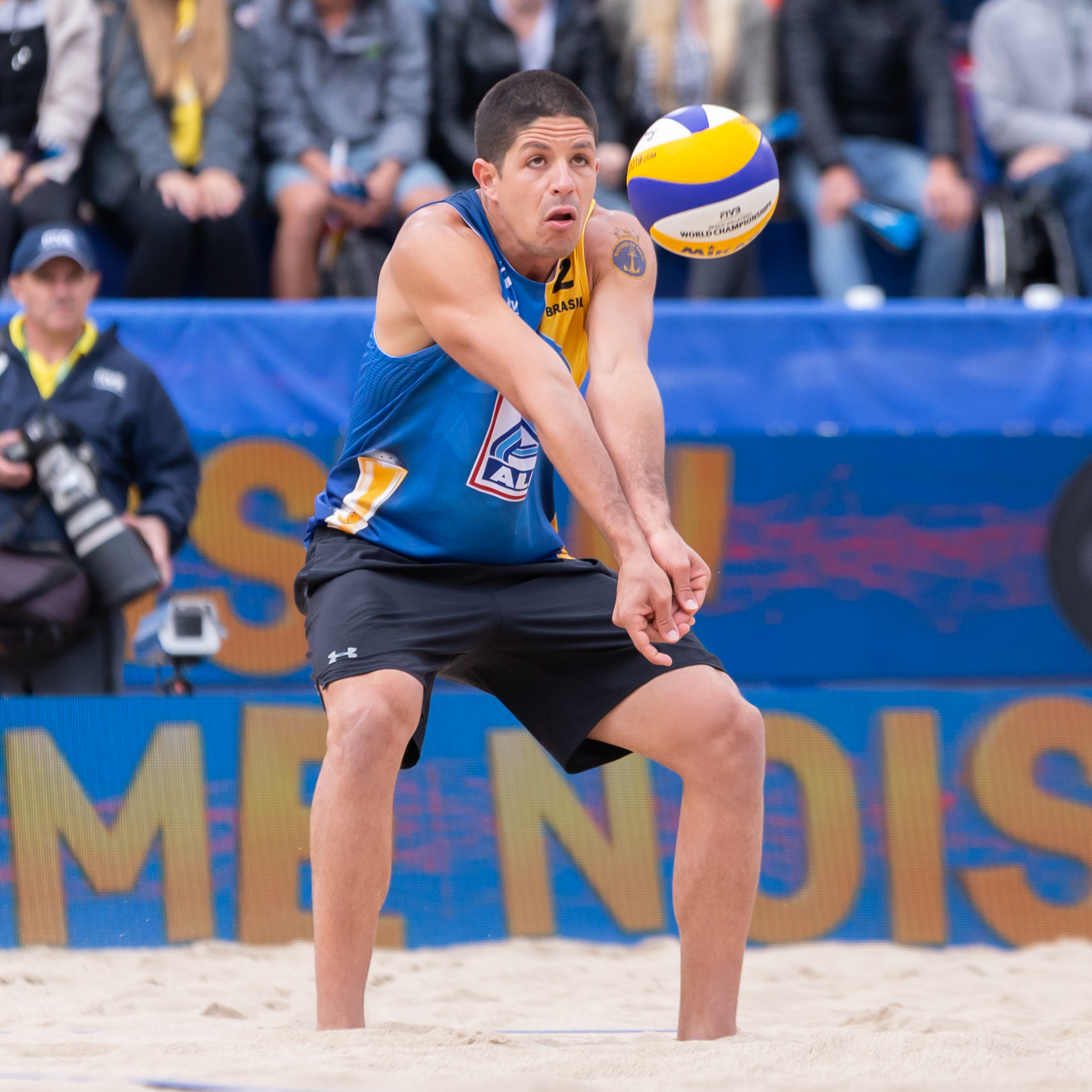
- Morais Filho at the 2019 World Championships

Personal information
- Full name: Álvaro Magliano de Morais Filho
- Nationality: Brazil
- Born: November 27, 1990 (age 35) João Pessoa, Paraíba, Brazil
- Height: 1.85 m (6 ft 1 in)
Beach volleyball information
Current teammate
- Years: Teammate
- –: Ricardo Santos
Honours
Men's beach volleyball
Representing Brazil
World Championships
Silver medal – second place	2013 Stare Jabłonki	Beach

Álvaro Magliano de Morais Filho (born November 27, 1990, in João Pessoa, Paraíba) is a Brazilian male beach volleyball player. Early in his adolescence, Álvaro liked to play football. By the influence of his father, who practices beach volleyball, Álvaro began venturing onto the sand and as he says himself: "I have become hooked to beach volleyball". He played with Vitor Felipe from 2007 to the middle of the 2011 season, when he started a partnership with Moisés. Over the years, he also played with Fábio Luiz, Benjamin, Luciano, and Thiago. In March 2013, he started playing with Ricardo Santos, a world-class Olympic Games gold medalist player. This partnership proved outstanding and led Álvaro and Ricardo to finish the FIVB Beach Volleyball World Championship Mazury 2013 in second place. Furthermore, Álvaro also won the prize of Most Valuable Player of the tournament. FIVB said that "... the tournament's Most Valuable Player Alvaro Filho not only performed superbly on the sand, but the statistics also reflected how well he played. The 22-year-old topped the most number of spikes and digs, illustrating how often he was served to while impressing with his backcourt play". In 2019, Álvaro partnered with Olympic champion - Alison Cerutti. The team competed in the Tokyo 2020 Olympics.

Awards
Preceded by Paolo Nicolai (ITA)	Men's FIVB World Tour "Most Improved"; 2013	Succeeded by Ryan Doherty (USA)
Preceded by Bruno Oscar Schmidt (BRA)	Men's FIVB World Tour "Sportsperson"; 2017	Succeeded by Incumbent
Preceded by Christiaan Varenhorst (NED)	Men's FIVB World Tour "Top Rookie"; 2013	Succeeded by Tri Bourne (USA)
