= Clemens Wickler =

German beach volleyball player (born 1995)

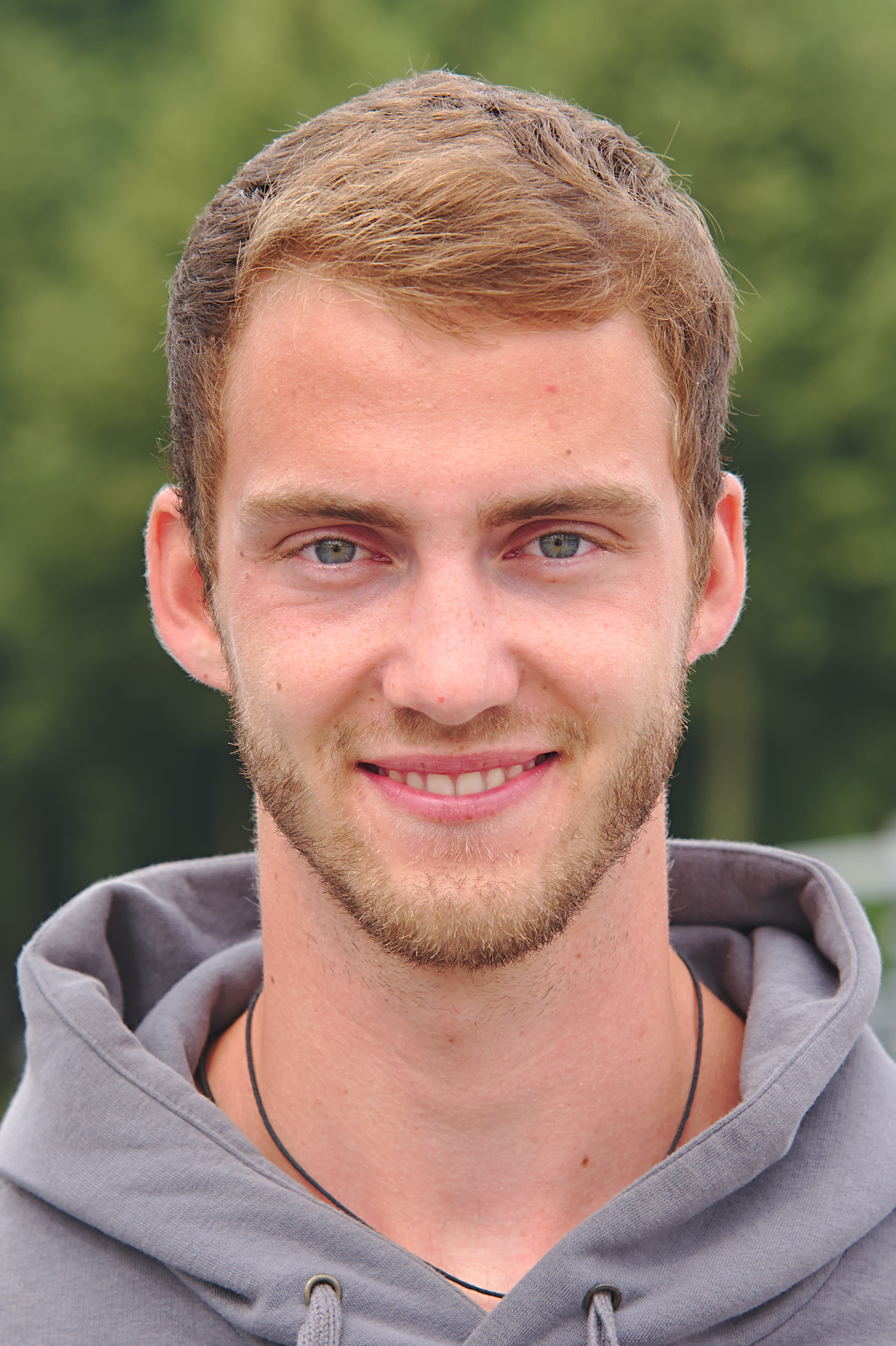
- Wickler in 2018

Personal information
- Nationality: German
- Born: 28 April 1995 (age 31); Starnberg, Germany
- Height: 1.90 m (6 ft 3 in)
- Weight: 80 kg (176 lb)

Beach volleyball information

Current teammate
Years	Teammate
2021–	Nils Ehlers

Previous teammates
Years
2018–2021
2016–2018
2014–2016
Teammate
Julius Thole
Tim Holler
Armin Dollinger
Honours
Olympic Games
Silver medal – second place	2024 Paris	Beach
World Championships
Silver medal – second place	2019 Hamburg	Beach
European Championships
Silver medal – second place	2024 Netherlands	Men's

Clemens Wickler (born 28 April 1995) is a German beach volleyball player.

Wickler won the silver medal at the 2019 Beach Volleyball World Championships with Julius Thole and, together with Nils Ehlers, the silver medal at the 2024 Summer Olympics and the 2024 European Championships.
