= Enrico Rossi (beach volleyball) =

Italian beach volleyball player (born 1993)

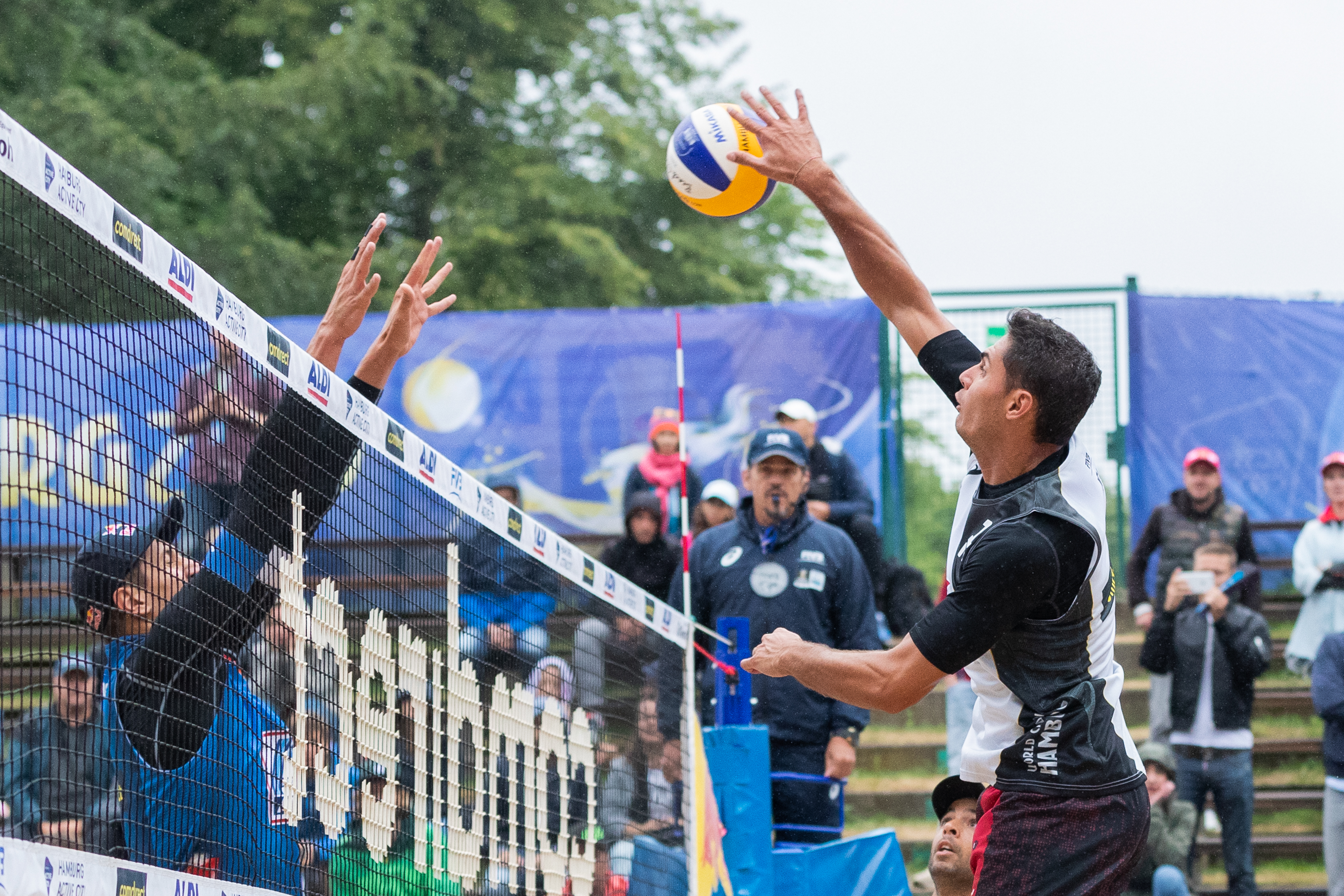
- Rossi in 2019

Personal information
- Nationality: Italy
- Born: 27 June 1993 (age 33) Cesenatico, Italy
- Height: 1.94 m (6 ft 4 in)

Sport
- Sport: Beach volleyball
Medal record
Men's beach volleyball
Representing Italy
Mediterranean Games
Silver medal – second place	2018 Tarragona	Team

Enrico Rossi (born 27 June 1993) is an Italian beach volleyball player. He competed in the 2020 Summer Olympics.
