= Julius Thole =

German beach volleyball player (born 1997)

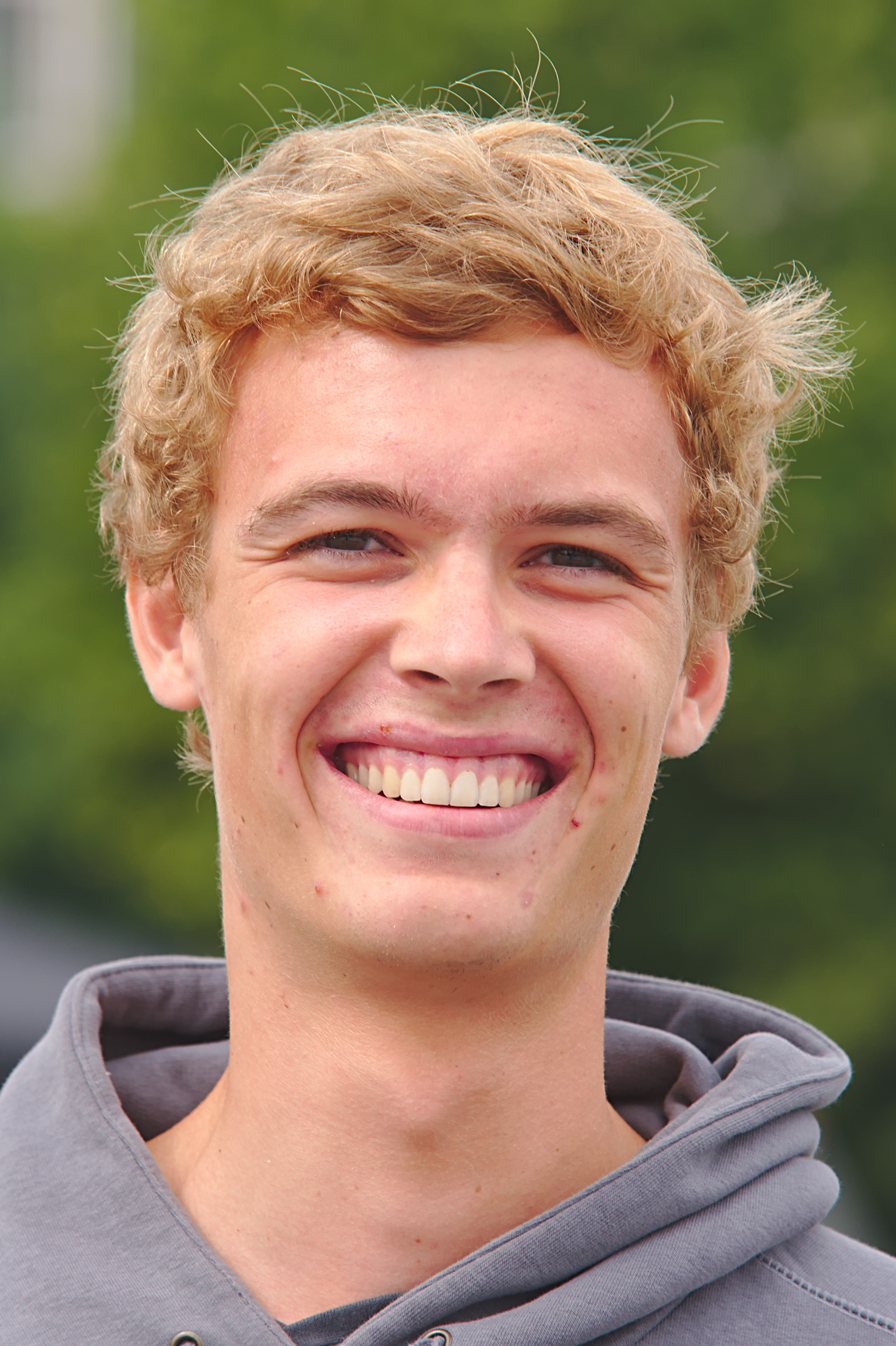

Personal information
- Nationality: German
- Born: 17 May 1997 (age 29); Hamburg, Germany
- Height: 2.06 m (6 ft 9 in)
- Weight: 88 kg (194 lb)

Beach volleyball information

Current teammate
Years	Teammate
2018–	Clemens Wickler

Previous teammates
Years	Teammate
2016–2017	Lorenz Schümann
Honours
World Championships
Silver medal – second place	2019 Hamburg	Beach

Julius Thole (born 17 May 1997) is a German beach volleyball player.

Thole won the silver medal at the 2019 Beach Volleyball World Championships with Clemens Wickler.
