= Nils Ehlers =

German beach volleyball player (born 1994)

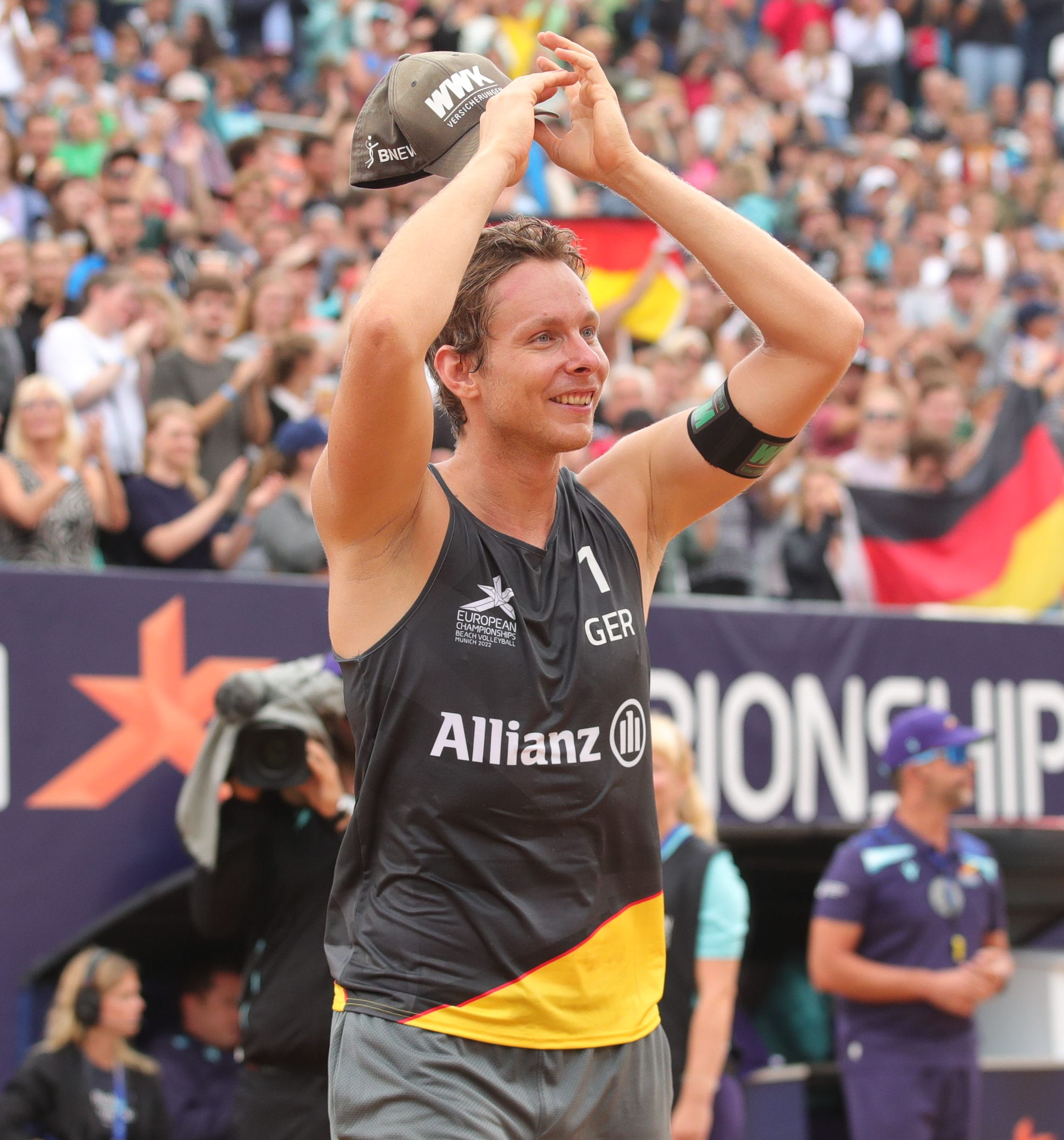
- Ehlers at the 2022 European Championships

Personal information
- Nationality: German
- Born: 4 February 1994 (age 32); Berlin, Germany
- Height: 211 cm (6 ft 11 in)

Beach volleyball information

Current teammate
Teammate
Clemens Wickler
Honours
Olympic Games
Silver medal – second place	2024 Paris	Beach
European Championships
Silver medal – second place	2024 Netherlands	Men's

Nils Ehlers (born 4 February 1994) is a German professional beach volleyball player. Together with teammate, Clemens Wickler, he is currently ranked number three on the FIVB Beach Volleyball World Ranking.

== Volleyball career ==
Ehlers began playing indoor volleyball in his home country in 2010 for TSV Spandau 1860. In 2014/15, the diagonal attacker played for the third division club Berliner VV. In the following season, he was active in the Bundesliga for Netzhoppers KW-Bestensee.

In 2024 together with Clemens Wickler, he won silver medal at the 2024 Summer Olympics and the 2024 European Championships.
