= Nikita Lyamin =

Russian beach volleyball player

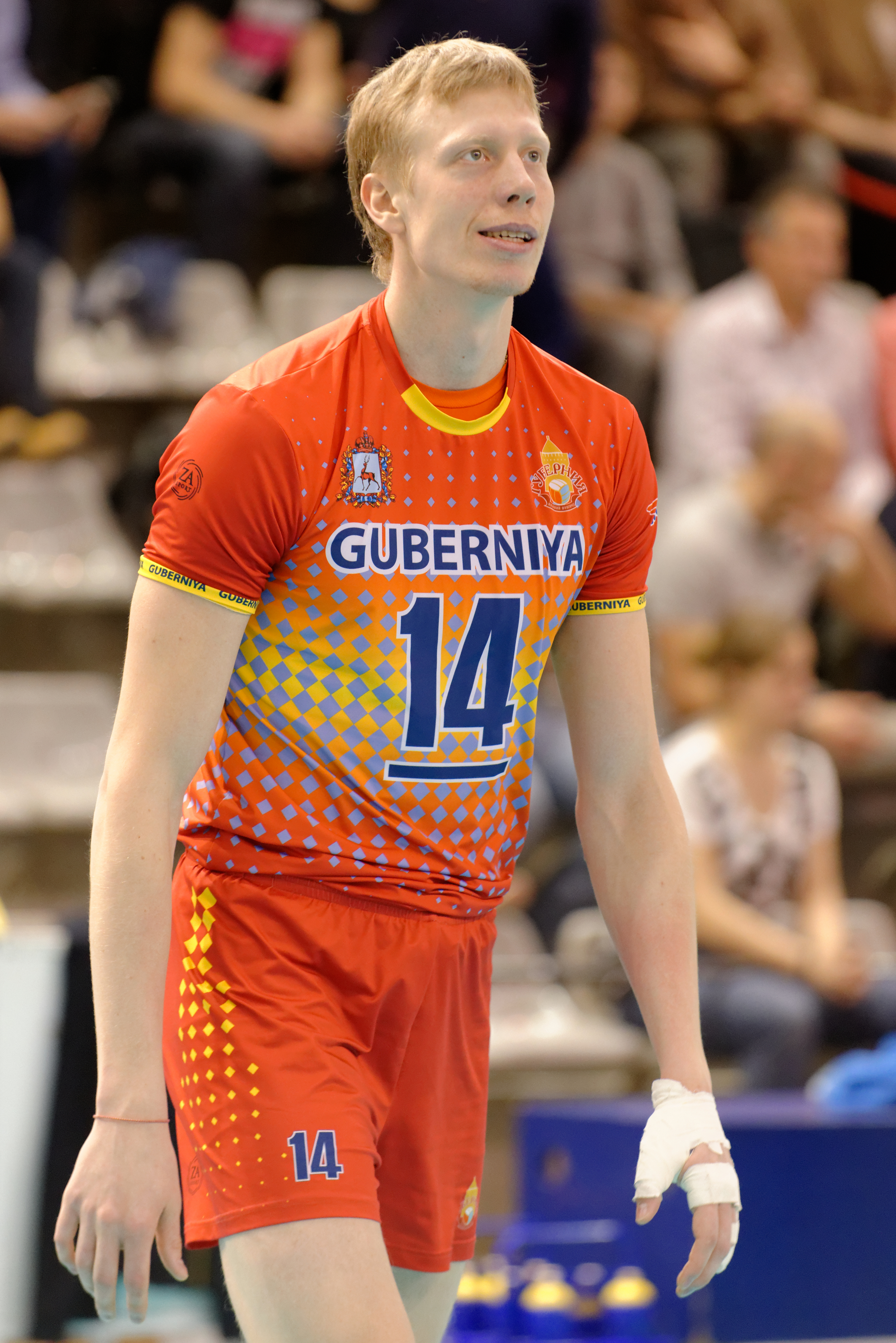

Personal information
- Nationality: Russian
- Born: Nikita Andreyevich Lyamin; 14 October 1985 (age 40) Gorky (now Nizhny Novgorod), RSFSR, USSR

Sport
- Sport: Volleyball (2002–14); Beach volleyball (2014–present)
Medal record
Men's beach volleyball
Representing Russia
World Championships
Bronze medal – third place	2017 Vienna	Beach

Nikita Andreyevich Lyamin (Russian: Никита Андреевич Лямин; born 14 October 1985), or Nikita Liamin, is a Russian beach volleyball player.

He competed at the 2016 Summer Olympics in Rio de Janeiro, in the men's beach volleyball tournament.

== Career ==
=== Indoor volleyball ===
Nikia Lyamin started playing volleyball at the Children's and Youth Sports School of Olympic Reserve No. 4 in Nizhny Novgorod, under the guidance of his father, Andrey. After finishing the sports school in 2002, Lyamin moved to the local team "Dinamo-UVO", a club in the highest Russian league.

In 2004, he played three seasons in the farm team and two more seasons in the main team for Dynamo Moscow. Dynamo Moscow became champions at the 2007–08 Russian Volleyball Super League, but Lyamin due to low game practice quit the club.

Lyamin moved to Nizhny Novgorod and became captain of Guberniya, which went on debuting in the B-division of the highest national league. In two years, Guberniya could enter the Super League, and in the 2012–13 season, it became one of the leading clubs in Russia. Guberniya qualified for the CEV Cup, and in March 2014, it became runners-up there. In Guberniya, Lyamin played as middle blocker, whereas in Dynamo he was mainly outside hitter, and sometimes libero.

=== Beach volleyball ===
In May 2014, Lyamin discovered beach volleyball and debuted at the national championships. Lyamin with partner Ivan Chirkin, who were both members of the club "Kasimov", took gold in the regional stage in Moscow and were 9th in the first main stage of the championships in Anapa. Lyamin quickly started playing outside Russia. In early July, he and Ruslan Bykanov won silver at the Eastern European Championship in Rokiškis and debuted at the Gstaad Grand Slam in 2014. The Russian duo did not show great results at this and the following two tournaments, so Lyamin teamed up with Dmitry Barsuk.

In August, Lyamin left Guberniya and fully concentrated on beach volleyball. His goal was to qualify for the 2016 Summer Olympics. The new duo competed on three tournaments, qualifying in Stare Jablonki and São Paulo and winning bronze at the Xiamen Open.

In the new 2015 season, Lyamin injured his shoulder and in May underwent surgery, making a break in his career six months long. He revived in December, and with Barsuk became runners-up at the Riga tournament of the East European Championships. Following their successful partnership, Lyamin/Barsuk qualified for the Olympics in Rio-de-Janeiro. The coaching staff of Barsuk and Lyamin supported this decision. In 17 July, the duo took the bronze medal at the Russian Championships in Sochi.

At the Olympics, the Russians won two of three matches in their group. They defeated 2015 World Championships bronze medallists, Brazilians Oliveira/Salgado. They lost in the quarterfinals to the Italians Daniele Lupo and Paolo Nicolai in a tight game, 18–21, 22–20, 11–15.

After the Olympic Games, Barsuk retired from international career. In 2017, Lyamin's new partner became Viacheslav Krasilnikov, who formerly played with Konstantin Semenov. On 18 February, the new duo won their first joint title, winning at the Kish Island Open.

Lyamin and Krasilnikov entered the semifinals of the 2017 Beach Volleyball World Championships, but they lost to Austrians Clemens Doppler and Alexander Horst. They eventually won the bronze medal after winning Christiaan Varenhorst and Maarten van Garderen, from the Netherlands.

== Personal life ==
Lyamin has a younger brother, Pavel (born 1994), who played youth volleyball for the club "Sormovich" from Nizhny Novgorod and "Neftyantik-2" from Orenburg. Their father, Andrey Valentinovich Lyamin, works as a volleyball coach at the Children's and Youth Sports School of Olympic Reserve No. 4.

Nikita is married to Olga Aleksandrovna Lyamina, a rhythmic gymnastics coach. They have two children, Anastasia and Antonina.
