= Techniker Beach Tour =

German series of professional beach volleyball tournaments

- Sport: Beach volleyball
- Founded: 2006
- Country: Germany
- Most recent champions: M: Tim Holler/Clemens Wickler; W: Chantal Laboureur/Julia Sude
- Broadcaster: ProSiebenSat.1 Media
- Website: Official website (in German)

The Techniker Beach Tour was a series of professional beach volleyball tournaments held annually in Germany. Prior to the 2018 season, it was known as the Smart Beach Tour. The tour is organized by the German Volleyball Association, and each season ends with the German Beach Volleyball Championships held at Timmendorfer Beach.

== History ==
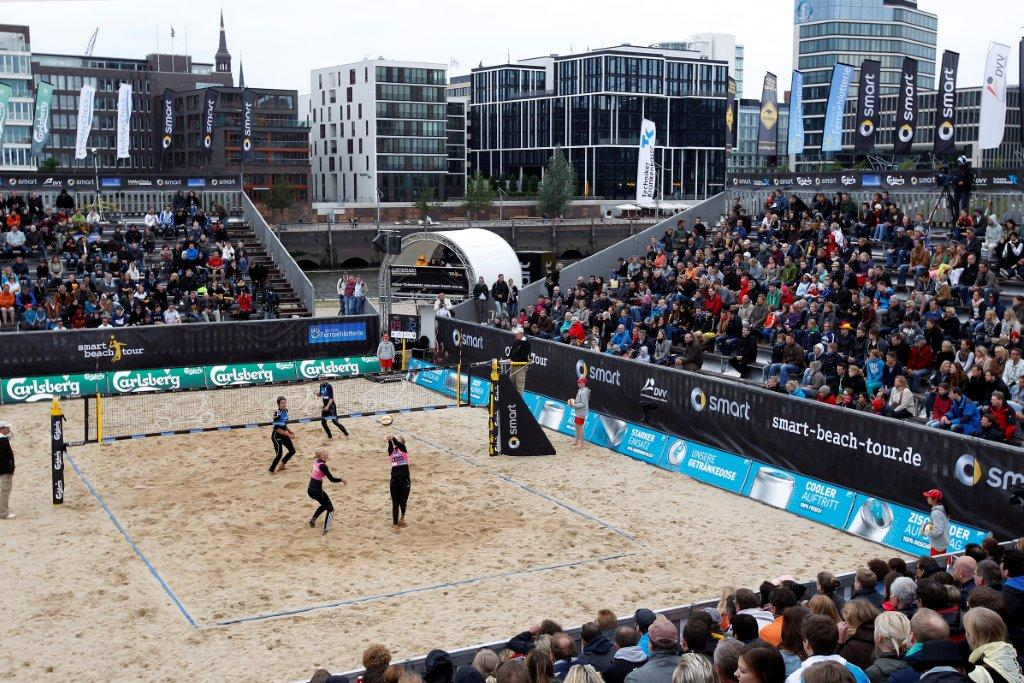
A typical match at a 2012 Smart Beach Tour tournament

The Smart Beach Tour began in 2006, replacing the German Masters and Cups series that began in 1993.

== German Beach Volleyball Championships ==
The German Beach Volleyball Championships are held at the end of each Techniker Beach Tour season at Timmendorfer Beach.

=== Men's results ===
Tournament	Champions	Runners-up	Third place
2006	Julius Brink and Christoph Dieckmann	Flo Huth and Stefan Uhmann	—N/a
2007	Julius Brink and Christoph Dieckmann	Kay Matysik and Stefan Uhmann	—N/a
2008; 29–31 August 2008	David Klemperer and Eric Koreng	Julius Brink and Christoph Dieckmann	—N/a
2009; 31 July – 2 August 2009	Julius Brink and Jonas Reckermann	Björn Andrae and Marcus Popp	David Klemperer and Eric Koreng
2010; 27–29 August 2010	Julius Brink and Jonas Reckermann	Markus Böckermann and Mischa Urbatzka	David Klemperer and Eric Koreng
2011; 26–28 August 2011	Julius Brink and Jonas Reckermann	Sebastian Dollinger and Stefan Windscheif	David Klemperer and Eric Koreng
2012; 24–26 August 2012	Jonathan Erdmann and Kay Matysik	Eric Koreng and Alexander Walkenhorst	Sebastian Dollinger and Stefan Windscheif
2013; 30 August – 1 September 2013	Markus Böckermann and Mischa Urbatzka	Lars Flüggen and Alexander Walkenhorst	Sebastian Dollinger and Stefan Windscheif
2014; 28–31 August 2014	Jonathan Erdmann and Kay Matysik	Thomas Kaczmarek and Sebastian Fuchs	Sebastian Dollinger and Lars Flüggen
2015	Clemens Wickler and Armin Dollinger	Kay Matysik and Jonathan Erdmann	Tim Holler and Jonas Schröder
2016; 8–11 September 2016	Markus Böckermann and Lars Flüggen	Jonathan Erdmann and Thomas Kaczmarek	Kay Matysik and Alexander Walkenhorst
2017; 31 August – 3 September 2017	Tim Holler and Clemens Wickler	Sebastian Fuchs and Eric Stadie	Philipp Arne Bergmann and Yannick Harms

=== Women's results ===
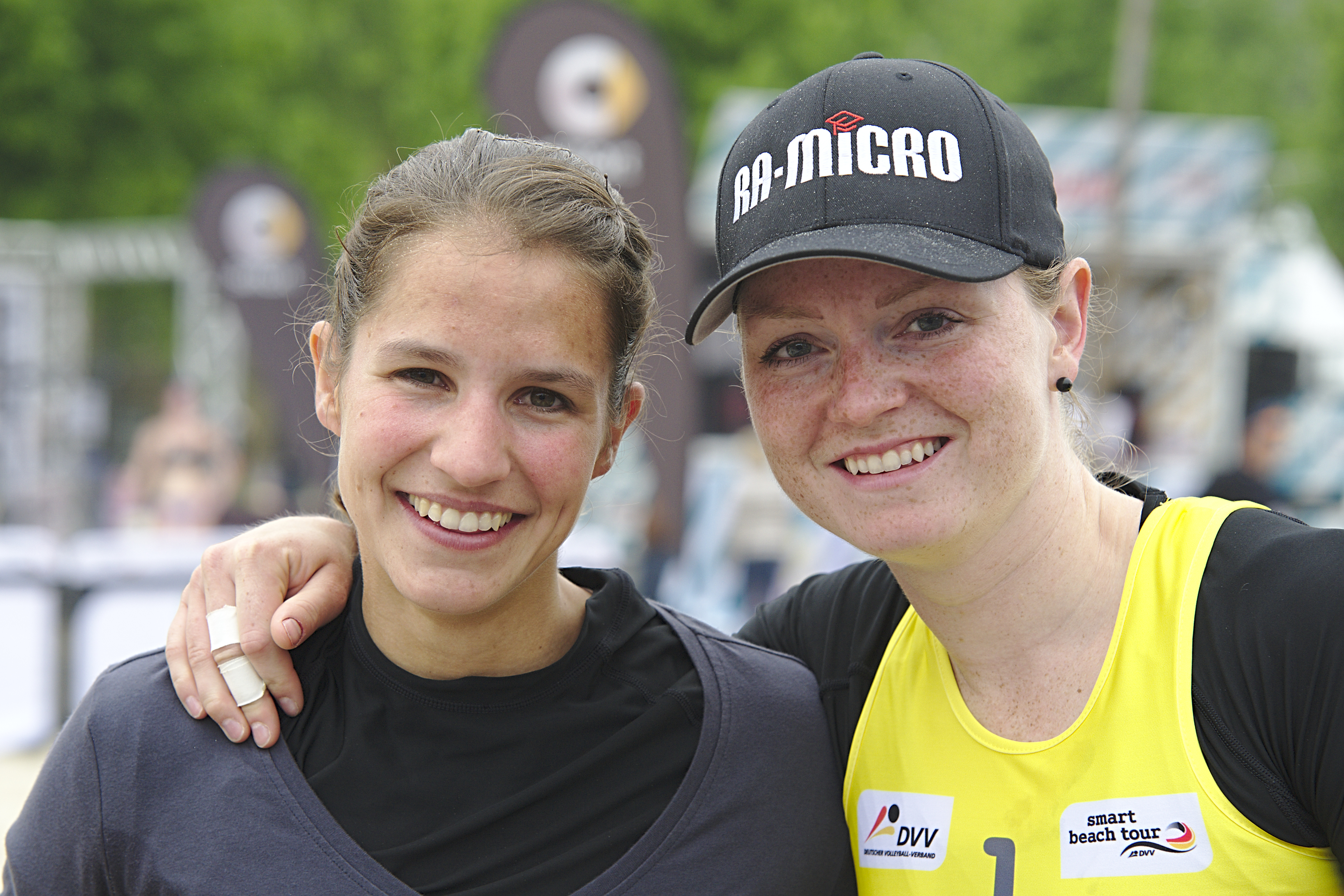
Chantal Laboureur and Julia Sude, the 2017 German Champions

Tournament	Champions	Runners-up	Third place
2006	Sara Goller and Laura Ludwig	Rieke Brink-Abeler and Hella Jurich	—N/a
2007	Sara Goller and Laura Ludwig	Helke Claasen and Antje Röder	—N/a
2008; 29–31 August 2008	Sara Goller and Laura Ludwig	Rieke Brink-Abeler and Hella Jurich	—N/a
2009; 31 July – 2 August 2009	Katrin Holtwick and Ilka Semmler	Geeske Banck and Anja Günther	Sara Goller and Laura Ludwig
2010; 27–29 August 2010	Jana Köhler and Julia Sude	Sara Goller and Laura Ludwig	Katrin Holtwick and Ilka Semmler
2011; 26–28 August 2011	Sara Goller and Laura Ludwig	Jana Köhler and Julia Sude	Karla Borger and Britta Büthe
2012; 24–26 August 2012	Katrin Holtwick and Ilka Semmler	Geeske Banck and Kira Walkenhorst	Teresa Mersmann and Cinja Tillmann
2013; 30 August – 1 September 2013	Laura Ludwig and Kira Walkenhorst	Katrin Holtwick and Ilka Semmler	Karla Borger and Britta Büthe
2014; 28–31 August 2014	Karla Borger and Britta Büthe	Laura Ludwig and Julia Sude	Katrin Holtwick and Ilka Semmler
2015	Laura Ludwig and Kira Walkenhorst	Teresa Mersmann and Isabel Schneider	Katrin Holtwick and Ilka Semmler
2016; 8–11 September 2016	Laura Ludwig and Kira Walkenhorst	Chantal Laboureur and Julia Sude	Karla Borger and Britta Büthe
2017; 31 August – 3 September 2017	Chantal Laboureur and Julia Sude	Melanie Gernert and Tatjana Zautys	Karla Borger and Margareta Kozuch
