= 2015 European Beach Volleyball Championships =

International beach volleyball competition

The 2015 European Beach Volleyball Championships was held from July 28 to August 2, 2015 in Klagenfurt, Austria.

== Men's tournament ==
=== Preliminary round ===
==== Pool A ====
| Pos | Team | Pld | W | L | Pts | SW | SL | SR | SPW | SPL | SPR | Qualification |
|---|---|---|---|---|---|---|---|---|---|---|---|---|
| 1 | (Netherlands) Nummerdor–Varenhorst | 3 | 3 | 0 | 6 | 6 | 3 | 2.000 | 161 | 128 | 1.258 | Round of 16 |
| 2 | (Switzerland) Gabathuler–Gerson | 3 | 2 | 1 | 5 | 5 | 4 | 1.250 | 154 | 164 | 0.939 | Round of 24 |
| 3 | (Czech Republic) Kubala–Hadrava | 3 | 1 | 2 | 4 | 2 | 4 | 0.500 | 151 | 162 | 0.932 | Round of 24 |
| 4 | (Turkey) Göğtepe–Giginoglu | 3 | 0 | 3 | 3 | 3 | 6 | 0.500 | 146 | 158 | 0.924 | |

| Date | Time | | Score | | Set 1 | Set 2 | Set 3 | Total | Report |
|---|---|---|---|---|---|---|---|---|---|
| 29 Jul | 12:00 | Nummerdor–Varenhorst (Netherlands) | 2–1 | (Czech Republic) Kubala–Hadrava | 19–21 | 21–14 | 15–9 | 55–44 | |
| 29 Jul | 12:00 | Gabathuler–Gerson (Switzerland) | 2–1 | (Turkey) Göğtepe–Giginoglu | 18–21 | 21–19 | 16–14 | 55–54 | |
| 30 Jul | 14:00 | Nummerdor–Varenhorst (Netherlands) | 2–1 | (Turkey) Göğtepe–Giginoglu | 21–15 | 18–21 | 15–9 | 54-45 | |
| 30 Jul | 14:00 | Gabathuler–Gerson (Switzerland) | 2–1 | (Czech Republic) Kubala–Hadrava | 20–22 | 21–19 | 19–17 | 60-58 | |
| 31 Jul | 11:00 | Nummerdor–Varenhorst (Netherlands) | 2–1 | (Switzerland) Gabathuler–Gerson | 21–12 | 16–21 | 15-6 | 52–39 | |
| 31 Jul | 11:00 | Göğtepe–Giginoglu (Turkey) | 1–2 | (Czech Republic) Kubala–Hadrava | 13–21 | 21–13 | 13–15 | 47–49 | |

==== Pool B ====
| Pos | Team | Pld | W | L | Pts | SW | SL | SR | SPW | SPL | SPR | Qualification |
|---|---|---|---|---|---|---|---|---|---|---|---|---|
| 1 | (Latvia) Samoilovs–Šmēdiņš | 3 | 3 | 0 | 6 | 6 | 0 | MAX | 126 | 104 | 1.212 | Round of 16 |
| 2 | (Italy) Ranghieri–Carambula | 3 | 2 | 1 | 5 | 4 | 3 | 1.333 | 129 | 116 | 1.112 | Round of 24 |
| 3 | (Austria) Huber–Seidl | 3 | 1 | 2 | 4 | 3 | 4 | 0.750 | 123 | 129 | 0.953 | Round of 24 |
| 4 | (Spain) Marco–García | 3 | 0 | 3 | 3 | 0 | 6 | 0.000 | 97 | 126 | 0.770 | |

| Date | Time | | Score | | Set 1 | Set 2 | Set 3 | Total | Report |
|---|---|---|---|---|---|---|---|---|---|
| 29 Jul | 16:00 | Samoilovs–Šmēdiņš (Latvia) | 2–0 | (Austria) Huber–Seidl | 21–17 | 21–19 | | 42–36 | |
| 29 Jul | 16:00 | Ranghieri–Carambula (Italy) | 2–0 | (Spain) Marco–García | 21–12 | 21–17 | | 42–29 | |
| 30 Jul | 15:00 | Samoilovs–Šmēdiņš (Latvia) | 2–0 | (Spain) Marco–García | 21–19 | 21–14 | | 42–33 | |
| 30 Jul | 15:00 | Ranghieri–Carambula (Italy) | 2–1 | (Austria) Huber–Seidl | 16–21 | 21–14 | 15–10 | 52-45 | |
| 31 Jul | 14:00 | Samoilovs–Šmēdiņš (Latvia) | 2–0 | (Italy) Ranghieri–Carambula | 21–17 | 21–18 | | 42–35 | |
| 31 Jul | | Marco–García (Spain) | 0–2 | (Austria) Huber–Seidl | 18–21 | 17–21 | | 35–42 | |

==== Pool C ====
| Pos | Team | Pld | W | L | Pts | SW | SL | SR | SPW | SPL | SPR | Qualification |
|---|---|---|---|---|---|---|---|---|---|---|---|---|
| 1 | (Netherlands) Brouwer–Meeuwsen | 3 | 2 | 1 | 5 | 2 | 1 | 2.000 | 139 | 130 | 1.069 | Round of 16 |
| 2 | (Germany) Flüggen–Böckermann | 3 | 2 | 1 | 5 | 2 | 1 | 2.000 | 129 | 134 | 0.963 | Round of 24 |
| 3 | (Italy) Ingrosso–Ingrosso | 3 | 2 | 1 | 5 | 2 | 1 | 2.000 | 124 | 126 | 0.984 | Round of 24 |
| 4 | (Austria) Eglseer–Müllner | 3 | 0 | 3 | 3 | 0 | 2 | 0.000 | 130 | 146 | 0.890 | |

| Date | Time | | Score | | Set 1 | Set 2 | Set 3 | Total | Report |
|---|---|---|---|---|---|---|---|---|---|
| 29 Jul | 12:00 | Brouwer–Meeuwsen (Netherlands) | 2–0 | (Austria) Eglseer–Müllner | 23–21 | 23–21 | | 46–42 | |
| 29 Jul | 12:00 | Ingrosso–Ingrosso (Italy) | 2–0 | (Germany) Flüggen–Böckermann | 21–18 | 21–19 | | 42–37 | |
| 30 Jul | 16:00 | Flüggen–Böckermann (Germany) | 2–1 | (Netherlands) Brouwer–Meeuwsen | 21–17 | 10–21 | 15–13 | 46-51 | |
| 30 Jul | 16:00 | Ingrosso–Ingrosso (Italy) | 2–1 | (Austria) Eglseer–Müllner | 21–14 | 18-21 | 15–12 | 54-47 | |
| 31 Jul | 09:00 | Brouwer–Meeuwsen (Netherlands) | 2–0 | (Italy) Ingrosso–Ingrosso | 21–12 | 21–16 | | 42–28 | |
| 31 Jul | 09:00 | Flüggen–Böckermann (Germany) | 2–0 | (Austria) Eglseer–Müllner | 21–18 | 25–23 | | 46–41 | |

==== Pool D ====
| Pos | Team | Pld | W | L | Pts | SW | SL | SR | SPW | SPL | SPR | Qualification |
|---|---|---|---|---|---|---|---|---|---|---|---|---|
| 1 | (Austria) Doppler–Horst | 3 | 3 | 0 | 6 | 6 | 0 | MAX | 127 | 92 | 1.380 | Round of 16 |
| 2 | (Poland) Kądzioła–Szałankiewicz | 3 | 1 | 2 | 4 | 3 | 5 | 0.600 | 145 | 150 | 0.967 | Round of 24 |
| 3 | (Italy) Caminati–Rossi | 3 | 1 | 2 | 4 | 3 | 5 | 0.600 | 150 | 158 | 0.949 | Round of 24 |
| 4 | (Belarus) Kavalenka–Dziadkou | 3 | 1 | 2 | 4 | 3 | 5 | 0.600 | 137 | 159 | 0.862 | |

| Date | Time | | Score | | Set 1 | Set 2 | Set 3 | Total | Report |
|---|---|---|---|---|---|---|---|---|---|
| 29 Jul | 13:00 | Doppler–Horst (Austria) | 2–0 | (Belarus) Kavalenka–Dziadkou | 21–14 | 21–13 | | 42–27 | |
| 29 Jul | 13:00 | Caminati–Rossi (Italy) | 2–1 | (Poland) Kądzioła–Szałankiewicz | 18–21 | 23–21 | 16–14 | 57–56 | |
| 30 Jul | 13:00 | Doppler–Horst (Austria) | 2–0 | (Italy) Caminati–Rossi | 22–20 | 21–17 | | 41–37 | |
| 30 Jul | 13:00 | Kądzioła–Szałankiewicz (Poland) | 2–1 | (Belarus) Kavalenka–Dziadkou | 24–22 | 22–24 | 15-5 | 61–51 | |
| 31 Jul | 13:00 | Doppler–Horst (Austria) | 2–0 | (Poland) Kądzioła–Szałankiewicz | 21–10 | 21–18 | | 42–28 | |
| 31 Jul | 13:00 | Caminati–Rossi (Italy) | 1–2 | (Belarus) Kavalenka–Dziadkou | 22–20 | 22–24 | 12–15 | 56–59 | |

==== Pool E ====
| Pos | Team | Pld | W | L | Pts | SW | SL | SR | SPW | SPL | SPR | Qualification |
|---|---|---|---|---|---|---|---|---|---|---|---|---|
| 1 | (Italy) Nicolai–Lupo | 3 | 3 | 0 | 6 | 6 | 1 | 6.000 | 145 | 118 | 1.229 | Round of 16 |
| 2 | (Russia) Semenov–Krasilnikov | 3 | 2 | 1 | 5 | 4 | 2 | 2.000 | 124 | 105 | 1.181 | Round of 24 |
| 3 | (Germany) Fuchs–Kaczmarek | 3 | 1 | 2 | 4 | 2 | 4 | 0.500 | 105 | 121 | 0.868 | Round of 24 |
| 4 | (England) Gregory–Sheaf | 3 | 0 | 3 | 3 | 1 | 6 | 0.167 | 110 | 140 | 0.786 | |

| Date | Time | | Score | | Set 1 | Set 2 | Set 3 | Total | Report |
|---|---|---|---|---|---|---|---|---|---|
| 29 Jul | 13:00 | Nicolai–Lupo (Italy) | 2–1 | (England) Gregory–Sheaf | 19–21 | 21–13 | 15–11 | 55–45 | |
| 29 Jul | 13:00 | Semenov–Krasilnikov (Russia) | 2–0 | (Germany) Fuchs–Kaczmarek | 21–13 | 21–19 | | 42–29 | |
| 30 Jul | 13:00 | Nicolai–Lupo (Italy) | 2–0 | (Germany) Fuchs–Kaczmarek | 21–18 | 21–15 | | 42–33 | |
| 30 Jul | 13:00 | Semenov–Krasilnikov (Russia) | 2–0 | (England) Gregory–Sheaf | 21–13 | 21–15 | | 42–28 | |
| 31 Jul | 12:00 | Nicolai–Lupo (Italy) | 2–0 | (Russia) Semenov–Krasilnikov | 27–25 | 21–15 | | 48–40 | |
| 31 Jul | 12:00 | Fuchs–Kaczmarek (Germany) | 2–0 | (England) Gregory–Sheaf | 21–17 | 22–20 | | 43–37 | |

==== Pool F ====
| Pos | Team | Pld | W | L | Pts | SW | SL | SR | SPW | SPL | SPR | Qualification |
|---|---|---|---|---|---|---|---|---|---|---|---|---|
| 1 | (Poland) Kantor–Łosiak | 3 | 2 | 1 | 5 | 5 | 2 | 2.500 | 136 | 114 | 1.193 | Round of 16 |
| 2 | (Germany) Erdmann–Wickler | 3 | 2 | 1 | 5 | 4 | 2 | 2.000 | 118 | 107 | 1.103 | Round of 24 |
| 3 | (Greece) Georgios–Nikos | 3 | 1 | 2 | 4 | 2 | 4 | 0.500 | 108 | 125 | 0.864 | Round of 24 |
| 4 | (Norway) Horrem–Eithun | 3 | 1 | 2 | 4 | 2 | 5 | 0.400 | 124 | 140 | 0.886 | |

| Date | Time | | Score | | Set 1 | Set 2 | Set 3 | Total | Report |
|---|---|---|---|---|---|---|---|---|---|
| 29 Jul | 16:00 | Erdmann–Wickler (Germany) | 2–0 | (Greece) Georgios–Nikos | 21–17 | 21–13 | | 42–30 | |
| 29 Jul | 16:00 | Horrem–Eithun (Norway) | 2–1 | (Poland) Kantor–Łosiak | 12–21 | 21–18 | 15–13 | 48–52 | |
| 30 Jul | 15:00 | Erdmann–Wickler (Germany) | 2–0 | (Norway) Horrem–Eithun | 21–19 | 21–16 | | 42–35 | |
| 30 Jul | 15:00 | Kantor–Łosiak (Poland) | 2–0 | (Greece) Georgios–Nikos | 21–13 | 21–19 | | 42–32 | |
| 31 Jul | 13:00 | Erdmann–Wickler (Germany) | 0–2 | (Poland) Kantor–Łosiak | 18–21 | 16–21 | | 34–42 | |
| 31 Jul | 13:00 | Horrem–Eithun (Norway) | 0–2 | (Greece) Georgios–Nikos | 23–25 | 18–21 | | 41–46 | |

==== Pool G ====
| Pos | Team | Pld | W | L | Pts | SW | SL | SR | SPW | SPL | SPR | Qualification |
|---|---|---|---|---|---|---|---|---|---|---|---|---|
| 1 | (Spain) Herrera–Gavira | 3 | 3 | 0 | 6 | 6 | 0 | MAX | 126 | 102 | 1.235 | Round of 16 |
| 2 | (Switzerland) Kissling–Strasser | 3 | 1 | 2 | 4 | 2 | 4 | 0.500 | 111 | 116 | 0.957 | Round of 24 |
| 3 | (France) Krou–Salvetti | 3 | 1 | 2 | 4 | 2 | 4 | 0.500 | 108 | 116 | 0.931 | Round of 24 |
| 4 | (Poland) Bryl–Kujawiak | 3 | 1 | 2 | 4 | 2 | 4 | 0.500 | 108 | 119 | 0.908 | |

| Date | Time | | Score | | Set 1 | Set 2 | Set 3 | Total | Report |
|---|---|---|---|---|---|---|---|---|---|
| 29 Jul | 17:00 | Herrera–Gavira (Spain) | 2–0 | (Switzerland) Kissling–Strasser | 21–17 | 21–17 | | 42–34 | |
| 29 Jul | 17:00 | Krou–Salvetti (France) | 2–0 | (Poland) Bryl–Kujawiak | 21–18 | 21–14 | | 42–32 | |
| 30 Jul | 16:00 | Herrera–Gavira (Spain) | 2–0 | (Poland) Bryl–Kujawiak | 21–18 | 21–16 | | 42–34 | |
| 30 Jul | 16:00 | Kissling–Strasser (Switzerland) | 2–0 | (France) Krou–Salvetti | 21–16 | 21–16 | | 42–32 | |
| 31 Jul | 14:00 | Herrera–Gavira (Spain) | 2–0 | (France) Krou–Salvetti | 21–15 | 21–19 | | 42–34 | |
| 31 Jul | 14:00 | Bryl–Kujawiak (Poland) | 2–0 | (Switzerland) Kissling–Strasser | 21–18 | 21–17 | | 42–35 | |

==== Pool H ====
| Pos | Team | Pld | W | L | Pts | SW | SL | SR | SPW | SPL | SPR | Qualification |
|---|---|---|---|---|---|---|---|---|---|---|---|---|
| 1 | (Poland) Fijałek–Prudel | 3 | 3 | 0 | 6 | 6 | 1 | 6.000 | 150 | 126 | 1.190 | Round of 16 |
| 2 | (Russia) Koshkarev–Barsouk | 3 | 2 | 1 | 5 | 5 | 2 | 2.500 | 151 | 144 | 1.049 | Round of 24 |
| 3 | (Germany) Walkenhorst–Windscheif | 3 | 1 | 2 | 4 | 2 | 5 | 0.400 | 127 | 134 | 0.948 | Round of 24 |
| 4 | (Austria) Winter–Petutschnig | 3 | 0 | 3 | 3 | 1 | 6 | 0.167 | 115 | 139 | 0.827 | |

| Date | Time | | Score | | Set 1 | Set 2 | Set 3 | Total | Report |
|---|---|---|---|---|---|---|---|---|---|
| 29 Jul | 17:00 | Walkenhorst–Windscheif (Germany) | 2–1 | (Austria) Winter–Petutschnig | 21–14 | 19–21 | 15–11 | 55–44 | |
| 29 Jul | 17:00 | Fijałek–Prudel (Poland) | 2–1 | (Russia) Koshkarev–Barsouk | 27–25 | 24–26 | 15–12 | 66–63 | |
| 30 Jul | 14:00 | Koshkarev–Barsouk (Russia) | 2–0 | (Germany) Walkenhorst–Windscheif | 25–23 | 21–18 | | 46–41 | |
| 30 Jul | 14:00 | Fijałek–Prudel (Poland) | 2–0 | (Austria) Winter–Petutschnig | 21–16 | 21–16 | | 42–32 | |
| 31 Jul | 12:00 | Walkenhorst–Windscheif (Germany) | 0–2 | (Poland) Fijałek–Prudel | 17–21 | 14–21 | | 31–42 | |
| 31 Jul | 12:00 | Koshkarev–Barsouk (Russia) | 2–0 | (Austria) Winter–Petutschnig | 21–18 | 21–19 | | 42–37 | |

=== Knockout stage ===
A draw was held to determine the pairings.

==== Round of 24 ====
| Date | Time | | Score | | Set 1 | Set 2 | Set 3 | Total | Report |
|---|---|---|---|---|---|---|---|---|---|
| 31 Jul | 17:00 | Koshkarev–Barsouk (Russia) | 1–2 | (Czech Republic) Kubala–Hadrava | 16–21 | 21–13 | 11-15 | 48–49 | |
| 31 Jul | 18:00 | Kądzioła–Szałankiewicz (Poland) | 2–0 | (Italy) Ingrosso–Ingrosso | 22–20 | 21–19 | | 43–39 | |
| 31 Jul | 18:00 | Flüggen–Böckermann (Germany) | 2–0 | (Italy) Caminati–Rossi | 21–14 | 21–14 | | 42–28 | |
| 31 Jul | 18:00 | Erdmann–Wickler (Germany) | 1–2 | (Germany) Walkenhorst–Windscheif | 16–21 | 21–13 | 11-15 | 48–49 | |
| 31 Jul | 19:00 | Kissling–Strasser (Switzerland) | 0–2 | (Germany) Fuchs–Kaczmarek | 18–21 | 14–21 | | 32–42 | |
| 31 Jul | 19:00 | Ranghieri–Carambula (Italy) | 2–0 | (France) Krou–Salvetti | 21–12 | 21–16 | | 42–28 | |
| 31 Jul | 19:00 | Semenov–Krasilnikov (Russia) | 2–0 | (Greece) Georgios–Nikos | 23–21 | 21–9 | | 44–30 | |
| 31 Jul | 19:00 | Gabathuler–Gerson (Switzerland) | 0–2 | (Austria) Huber–Seidl | 18–21 | 16–21 | | 34–42 | |

==== Round of 16 ====
| Date | Time | | Score | | Set 1 | Set 2 | Set 3 | Total | Report |
|---|---|---|---|---|---|---|---|---|---|
| 01 Aug | 10:00 | Nummerdor–Varenhorst (Netherlands) | 2–1 | (Poland) Kądzioła–Szałankiewicz | 15–21 | 21–19 | 17–15 | 53–55 | |
| 01-Aug | 10:00 | Fijałek–Prudel (Poland) | 2–0 | (Germany) Fuchs–Kaczmarek | 21–13 | 21–17 | | 42–30 | |
| 01 Aug | 11:00 | Nicolai–Lupo (Italy) | 0–2 | (Italy) Ranghieri–Carambula | 19–21 | 20–22 | | 39–43 | |
| 01-Aug | 11:00 | Brouwer–Meeuwsen (Netherlands) | 2–1 | (Czech Republic) Kubala–Hadrava | 17–21 | 21–19 | 15–7 | 53–47 | |
| 01-Aug | 11:00 | Kantor–Łosiak (Poland) | 2–0 | (Austria) Huber–Seidl | 21–14 | 21–19 | | 42–33 | |
| 01-Aug | 12:00 | Herrera–Gavira (Spain) | 2–0 | (Germany) Flüggen–Böckermann | 22–20 | 21–15 | | 43–35 | |
| 01-Aug | 12:00 | Samoilovs–Šmēdiņš (Latvia) | 2–1 | (Germany) Walkenhorst–Windscheif | 21–17 | 20–22 | 15–12 | 56–51 | |
| 01-Aug | 12:00 | Doppler–Horst (Austria) | 2–0 | (Russia) Semenov–Krasilnikov | 21–19 | 21–19 | | 42–38 | |

==== Quarterfinals ====
| Date | Time | | Score | | Set 1 | Set 2 | Set 3 | Total | Report |
|---|---|---|---|---|---|---|---|---|---|
| 01-Aug | 15:30 | Nummerdor–Varenhorst (Netherlands) | 2–1 | (Poland) Fijałek–Prudel | 21–18 | 14–21 | 15–10 | - | |
| 01-Aug | 16:30 | Ranghieri–Carambula (Italy) | 2–0 | (Austria) Doppler–Horst | 21–17 | 23–21 | | – | |
| 01-Aug | 17:30 | Brouwer–Meeuwsen (Netherlands) | 2–0 | (Poland) Kantor–Łosiak | 21–19 | 24–22 | | – | |
| 01-Aug | 18:30 | Herrera–Gavira (Spain) | 0–2 | (Latvia) Samoilovs–Šmēdiņš | 18–21 | 22–24 | | – | |

==== Semifinals ====
| Date | Time | | Score | | Set 1 | Set 2 | Set 3 | Total | Report |
|---|---|---|---|---|---|---|---|---|---|
| 02 Aug | 11:15 | Brouwer–Meeuwsen (Netherlands) | 0–2 | (Latvia) Samoilovs–Šmēdiņš | 18–21 | 19–21 | | – | |
| 02 Aug | 10:00 | Nummerdor–Varenhorst (Netherlands) | 0–2 | (Italy) Ranghieri–Carambula | 17–21 | 19–21 | | – | |

==== Third place game ====
| Date | Time | | Score | | Set 1 | Set 2 | Set 3 | Total | Report |
|---|---|---|---|---|---|---|---|---|---|
| 02 Aug | 13:30 | Nummerdor–Varenhorst (Netherlands) | 2–0 | (Netherlands) Brouwer–Meeuwsen | 21–18 | 21–16 | | – | |

==== Final ====
| Date | Time | | Score | | Set 1 | Set 2 | Set 3 | Total | Report |
|---|---|---|---|---|---|---|---|---|---|
| 02 Aug | 14:50 | Ranghieri–Carambula (Italy) | 0–2 | (Latvia) Samoilovs–Šmēdiņš | 18–21 | 18–21 | | – | |

== Women's tournament ==
=== Preliminary round ===
==== Pool A ====
| Pos | Team | Pld | W | L | Pts | SW | SL | SR | SPW | SPL | SPR | Qualification |
|---|---|---|---|---|---|---|---|---|---|---|---|---|
| 1 | (Netherlands) Meppelink–Van Iersel | 2 | 2 | 0 | 4 | 4 | 1 | 4.000 | 148 | 134 | 1.104 | Round of 16 |
| 2 | (Greece) Arvaniti–Tsiartsiani | 3 | 1 | 2 | 4 | 3 | 4 | 0.750 | 120 | 132 | 0.909 | Round of 24 |
| 3 | (Austria) Schützenhöfer–Plesiutschnig | 3 | 1 | 2 | 4 | 2 | 4 | 0.500 | 116 | 120 | 0.967 | Round of 24 |
| 4 | (Finland) Lehtonen–Lahti | 3 | 1 | 2 | 4 | 2 | 4 | 0.500 | 128 | 135 | 0.948 | |

| Date | Time | | Score | | Set 1 | Set 2 | Set 3 | Total | Report |
|---|---|---|---|---|---|---|---|---|---|
| 29 Jul | 15:00 | Meppelink–Van Iersel (Netherlands) | 2–1 | (Greece) Arvaniti–Tsiartsiani | 17–21 | 21–18 | 15–9 | 53–48 | |
| 29 Jul | 15:00 | Lehtonen–Lahti (Finland) | 0–2 | (Austria) Schützenhöfer–Plesiutschnig | 14–21 | 21–23 | | 35–44 | |
| 30 Jul | 11:00 | Meppelink–Van Iersel (Netherlands) | 2–0 | (Austria) Schützenhöfer–Plesiutschnig | 22–20 | 21–18 | | 43–38 | |
| 30 Jul | 11:00 | Lehtonen–Lahti (Finland) | 2–0 | (Greece) Arvaniti–Tsiartsiani | 21–17 | 24–22 | | 45–39 | |
| 31 Jul | 11:00 | Meppelink–Van Iersel (Netherlands) | 2–0 | (Finland) Lehtonen–Lahti | 22–20 | 30–28 | | 52–48 | |
| 31 Jul | 11:00 | Schützenhöfer–Plesiutschnig (Austria) | 0–2 | (Greece) Arvaniti–Tsiartsiani | 19–21 | 15–21 | | 34–42 | |

==== Pool B ====
| Pos | Team | Pld | W | L | Pts | SW | SL | SR | SPW | SPL | SPR | Qualification |
|---|---|---|---|---|---|---|---|---|---|---|---|---|
| 1 | (France) Jupiter–Longuet | 3 | 3 | 0 | 6 | 6 | 1 | 6.000 | 142 | 125 | 1.136 | Round of 16 |
| 2 | (Switzerland) Heidrich–Zumkehr | 3 | 2 | 1 | 5 | 4 | 3 | 1.333 | 137 | 123 | 1.114 | Round of 24 |
| 3 | (Austria) Rimser–Strauss | 3 | 1 | 2 | 4 | 2 | 4 | 0.500 | 114 | 127 | 0.898 | Round of 24 |
| 4 | (Russia) Barsuk–Rudykh | 3 | 0 | 3 | 3 | 2 | 6 | 0.333 | 141 | 159 | 0.887 | |

| Date | Time | | Score | | Set 1 | Set 2 | Set 3 | Total | Report |
|---|---|---|---|---|---|---|---|---|---|
| 29 Jul | 10:00 | Barsuk–Rudykh (Russia) | 0–2 | (Austria) Rimser–Strauss | 15–21 | 24–26 | | 39–47 | |
| 29 Jul | 10:00 | Heidrich–Zumkehr (Switzerland) | 0–2 | (France) Jupiter–Longuet | 18–21 | 19–21 | | 37–42 | |
| 30 Jul | 15:00 | Barsuk–Rudykh (Russia) | 1–2 | (France) Jupiter–Longuet | 20–22 | 21–18 | 10–15 | 51–55 | |
| 30 Jul | 15:00 | Heidrich–Zumkehr (Switzerland) | 2–0 | (Austria) Rimser–Strauss | 22–20 | 21–10 | | 43–30 | |
| 31 Jul | 10:00 | Barsuk–Rudykh (Russia) | 1–2 | (Switzerland) Heidrich–Zumkehr | 23–21 | 18–21 | 10–15 | 51–57 | |
| 31 Jul | 10:00 | Jupiter–Longuet (France) | 2–0 | (Austria) Rimser–Strauss | 21–15 | 24–22 | | 45–37 | |

==== Pool C ====
| Pos | Team | Pld | W | L | Pts | SW | SL | SR | SPW | SPL | SPR | Qualification |
|---|---|---|---|---|---|---|---|---|---|---|---|---|
| 1 | (Switzerland) Forrer–Vergé-Dépré | 3 | 3 | 0 | 6 | 6 | 1 | 6.000 | 96 | 71 | 1.352 | Round of 16 |
| 2 | (Germany) Borger–Büthe | 3 | 2 | 1 | 5 | 4 | 2 | 2.000 | 84 | 69 | 1.217 | Round of 24 |
| 3 | (Russia) Syrtseva–Prokopeva | 3 | 1 | 2 | 4 | 3 | 5 | 0.600 | 95 | 145 | 0.655 | Round of 24 |
| 4 | (Austria) Teufl–Zass | 3 | 0 | 3 | 3 | 1 | 6 | 0.167 | 104 | 136 | 0.765 | |

| Date | Time | | Score | | Set 1 | Set 2 | Set 3 | Total | Report |
|---|---|---|---|---|---|---|---|---|---|
| 29 Jul | 12:00 | Borger–Büthe (Germany) | 2–0 | (Austria) Teufl–Zass | 21–12 | 21–15 | | 42–27 | |
| 29 Jul | 12:00 | Forrer–Vergé-Dépré (Switzerland) | 2–1 | (Russia) Syrtseva–Prokopeva | 18–21 | 21–11 | 15–11 | 54–42 | |
| 30 Jul | 10:00 | Borger–Büthe (Germany) | – | (Russia) Syrtseva–Prokopeva | injury | | | | |
| 30 Jul | 10:00 | Forrer–Vergé-Dépré (Switzerland) | 2–0 | (Austria) Teufl–Zass | 21–16 | 21–12 | | 42–28 | |
| 31 Jul | 09:00 | Borger–Büthe (Germany) | – | (Switzerland) Forrer–Vergé-Dépré | forfeit | | | | |
| 31 Jul | 09:00 | Syrtseva–Prokopeva (Russia) | 2–1 | (Austria) Teufl–Zass | 16–21 | 21–17 | 15–11 | 52–49 | |

==== Pool D ====
| Pos | Team | Pld | W | L | Pts | SW | SL | SR | SPW | SPL | SPR | Qualification |
|---|---|---|---|---|---|---|---|---|---|---|---|---|
| 1 | (Germany) Ludwig–Walkenhorst | 3 | 3 | 0 | 6 | 6 | 1 | 6.000 | 139 | 105 | 1.324 | Round of 16 |
| 2 | (Switzerland) Goricanec–Hüberli | 3 | 2 | 1 | 5 | 5 | 3 | 1.667 | 149 | 139 | 1.072 | Round of 24 |
| 3 | (Netherlands) Wesselink–van der Vlist | 3 | 1 | 2 | 4 | 3 | 5 | 0.600 | 131 | 144 | 0.910 | Round of 24 |
| 4 | (Norway) Treland–Pedersen | 3 | 0 | 3 | 3 | 1 | 6 | 0.167 | 107 | 138 | 0.775 | |

| Date | Time | | Score | | Set 1 | Set 2 | Set 3 | Total | Report |
|---|---|---|---|---|---|---|---|---|---|
| 29 Jul | 11:00 | Ludwig–Walkenhorst (Germany) | 2–0 | (Norway) Treland–Pedersen | 21–17 | 21–9 | | 42–26 | |
| 29 Jul | 11:00 | Goricanec–Hüberli (Switzerland) | 2–1 | (Netherlands) Wesselink–van der Vlist | 22–20 | 18–21 | 15–9 | 55–50 | |
| 30 Jul | 11:00 | Ludwig–Walkenhorst (Germany) | 2–0 | (Netherlands) Wesselink–van der Vlist | 21–11 | 21–16 | | 42–27 | |
| 30 Jul | 11:00 | Goricanec–Hüberli (Switzerland) | 2–0 | (Norway) Treland–Pedersen | 21–16 | 21–18 | | 42–34 | |
| 31 Jul | 09:00 | Ludwig–Walkenhorst (Germany) | 2–1 | (Switzerland) Goricanec–Hüberli | 22–20 | 18–21 | 15–11 | 55–52 | |
| 31 Jul | 09:00 | Wesselink–van der Vlist (Netherlands) | 2–1 | (Norway) Treland–Pedersen | 21–14 | 18–21 | 15–12 | 54–47 | |

==== Pool E ====
| Pos | Team | Pld | W | L | Pts | SW | SL | SR | SPW | SPL | SPR | Qualification |
|---|---|---|---|---|---|---|---|---|---|---|---|---|
| 1 | (Spain) Liliana–Baquerizo | 3 | 3 | 0 | 6 | 6 | 1 | 6.000 | 138 | 108 | 1.278 | Round of 16 |
| 2 | (Slovakia) Dubovcova–Nestarcova | 3 | 2 | 1 | 5 | 4 | 2 | 2.000 | 112 | 100 | 1.120 | Round of 24 |
| 3 | (Spain) Lobato–Soria | 3 | 1 | 2 | 4 | 2 | 5 | 0.400 | 122 | 135 | 0.904 | Round of 24 |
| 4 | (Norway) Kongshavn–Kjølberg | 3 | 0 | 3 | 3 | 2 | 6 | 0.333 | 121 | 150 | 0.807 | |

| Date | Time | | Score | | Set 1 | Set 2 | Set 3 | Total | Report |
|---|---|---|---|---|---|---|---|---|---|
| 29 Jul | 13:00 | Liliana–Baquerizo (Spain) | 2–0 | (Spain) Lobato–Soria | 21–16 | 22–20 | | 43–36 | |
| 29 Jul | 13:00 | Dubovcova–Nestarcova (Slovakia) | 2–0 | (Norway) Kongshavn–Kjølberg | 21–14 | 21–13 | | 42–27 | |
| 30 Jul | 10:00 | Liliana–Baquerizo (Spain) | 2–1 | (Norway) Kongshavn–Kjølberg | 17–21 | 21–11 | 15–12 | 53–44 | |
| 30 Jul | 10:00 | Dubovcova–Nestarcova (Slovakia) | 2–0 | (Spain) Lobato–Soria | 21–14 | 21–17 | | 42–31 | |
| 31 Jul | 10:00 | Liliana–Baquerizo (Spain) | 2–0 | (Slovakia) Dubovcova–Nestarcova | 21–14 | 21–14 | | 42–28 | |
| 31 Jul | 10:00 | Kongshavn–Kjølberg (Norway) | 1–2 | (Spain) Lobato–Soria | 19–21 | 21–19 | 10–15 | 50–55 | |

==== Pool F ====
| Pos | Team | Pld | W | L | Pts | SW | SL | SR | SPW | SPL | SPR | Qualification |
|---|---|---|---|---|---|---|---|---|---|---|---|---|
| 1 | (Poland) Kołosińska–Brzostek | 3 | 3 | 0 | 6 | 6 | 1 | 6.000 | 148 | 110 | 1.345 | Round of 16 |
| 2 | (Germany) Holtwick–Semmler | 3 | 2 | 1 | 5 | 5 | 2 | 2.500 | 138 | 127 | 1.087 | Round of 24 |
| 3 | (Poland) Baran–Gruszczyńska | 3 | 1 | 2 | 4 | 2 | 5 | 0.400 | 108 | 137 | 0.788 | Round of 24 |
| 4 | (Switzerland) Betschart–Eiholzer | 3 | 0 | 3 | 3 | 1 | 6 | 0.167 | 120 | 140 | 0.857 | |

| Date | Time | | Score | | Set 1 | Set 2 | Set 3 | Total | Report |
|---|---|---|---|---|---|---|---|---|---|
| 29 Jul | 14:00 | Holtwick–Semmler (Germany) | 2–0 | (Switzerland) Betschart–Eiholzer | 21–19 | 21–17 | | 42–36 | |
| 29 Jul | 14:00 | Kołosińska–Brzostek (Poland) | 2–0 | (Poland) Baran–Gruszczyńska | 21–14 | 21–11 | | 42–25 | |
| 30 Jul | 14:00 | Holtwick–Semmler (Germany) | 2–0 | (Poland) Baran–Gruszczyńska | 21–12 | 21–15 | | 42–27 | |
| 30 Jul | 14:00 | Kołosińska–Brzostek (Poland) | 2–0 | (Switzerland) Betschart–Eiholzer | 21–15 | 21–16 | | 42–31 | |
| 31 Jul | 11:00 | Holtwick–Semmler (Germany) | 1–2 | (Poland) Kołosińska–Brzostek | 11–21 | 30–28 | 13–15 | 54–64 | |
| 31 Jul | 11:00 | Baran–Gruszczyńska (Poland) | 2–1 | (Switzerland) Betschart–Eiholzer | 21–18 | 20–22 | 15–13 | 56–53 | |

==== Pool G ====
| Pos | Team | Pld | W | L | Pts | SW | SL | SR | SPW | SPL | SPR | Qualification |
|---|---|---|---|---|---|---|---|---|---|---|---|---|
| 1 | (Germany) Laboureur–Sude | 3 | 3 | 0 | 6 | 6 | 0 | MAX | 126 | 75 | 1.680 | Round of 16 |
| 2 | (Lithuania) Povilaityte–Dumbauskaite | 3 | 2 | 1 | 5 | 4 | 3 | 1.333 | 121 | 116 | 1.043 | Round of 24 |
| 3 | (Finland) Hasu–Parkkinen | 3 | 1 | 2 | 4 | 2 | 5 | 0.400 | 117 | 137 | 0.854 | Round of 24 |
| 4 | (Sweden) Nilsson–Yoken | 3 | 0 | 3 | 3 | 2 | 6 | 0.333 | 115 | 151 | 0.762 | |

| Date | Time | | Score | | Set 1 | Set 2 | Set 3 | Total | Report |
|---|---|---|---|---|---|---|---|---|---|
| 29 Jul | 17:00 | Laboureur–Sude (Germany) | 2–0 | (Finland) Hasu–Parkkinen | 21–12 | 21–15 | | 42–27 | |
| 29 Jul | 17:00 | Nilsson–Yoken (Sweden) | 1–2 | (Lithuania) Povilaityte–Dumbauskaite | 21–17 | 11–21 | 8–15 | 40–53 | |
| 30 Jul | 15:00 | Laboureur–Sude (Germany) | 2–0 | (Lithuania) Povilaityte–Dumbauskaite | 21–17 | 21–9 | | 42–26 | |
| 30 Jul | 15:00 | Nilsson–Yoken (Sweden) | 1–2 | (Finland) Hasu–Parkkinen | 21–16 | 15–21 | 17–19 | 53–56 | |
| 31 Jul | 12:00 | Laboureur–Sude (Germany) | 2–0 | (Sweden) Nilsson–Yoken | 21–11 | 21–11 | | 42–22 | |
| 31 Jul | 12:00 | Povilaityte–Dumbauskaite (Lithuania) | 2–0 | (Finland) Hasu–Parkkinen | 21–18 | 21–16 | | 42–34 | |

==== Pool H ====
| Pos | Team | Pld | W | L | Pts | SW | SL | SR | SPW | SPL | SPR | Qualification |
|---|---|---|---|---|---|---|---|---|---|---|---|---|
| 1 | (Austria) Schwaiger–Hansel | 3 | 3 | 0 | 6 | 6 | 0 | MAX | 126 | 94 | 1.340 | Round of 16 |
| 2 | (Italy) Giombini–Toti | 3 | 2 | 1 | 5 | 4 | 3 | 1.333 | 125 | 125 | 1.000 | Round of 24 |
| 3 | (Russia) Ukolova–Birlova | 3 | 1 | 2 | 4 | 3 | 4 | 0.750 | 119 | 129 | 0.922 | Round of 24 |
| 4 | (Russia) Dabizha–Abalakina | 3 | 0 | 3 | 3 | 0 | 6 | 0.000 | 106 | 128 | 0.828 | |

| Date | Time | | Score | | Set 1 | Set 2 | Set 3 | Total | Report |
|---|---|---|---|---|---|---|---|---|---|
| 29 Jul | 16:00 | Schwaiger–Hansel (Austria) | 2–0 | (Italy) Giombini–Toti | 21–11 | 21–14 | | 42–25 | |
| 29 Jul | 16:00 | Ukolova–Birlova (Russia) | 2–0 | (Russia) Dabizha–Abalakina | 21–13 | 21–18 | | 42–31 | |
| 30 Jul | 14:00 | Schwaiger–Hansel (Austria) | 2–0 | (Russia) Dabizha–Abalakina | 21–18 | 21–19 | | 42–37 | |
| 30 Jul | 14:00 | Ukolova–Birlova (Russia) | 1–2 | (Italy) Giombini–Toti | 22–20 | 14–21 | 9–15 | 45–56 | |
| 31 Jul | 12:00 | Schwaiger–Hansel (Austria) | 2–0 | (Russia) Ukolova–Birlova | 21–14 | 21–18 | | 42–34 | |
| 31 Jul | 12:00 | Dabizha–Abalakina (Russia) | 0–2 | (Italy) Giombini–Toti | 17–21 | 21–23 | | 38–44 | |

=== Knockout stage ===
A draw was held to determine the pairings.

==== Round of 24 ====
| Date | Time | | Score | | Set 1 | Set 2 | Set 3 | Total | Report |
|---|---|---|---|---|---|---|---|---|---|
| 30 Jul | 18:00 | Dubovcova–Nestarcova (Slovakia) | 2–0 | (Netherlands) Wesselink–van der Vlist | 21–11 | 23–21 | | 44–32 | |
| 30 Jul | 17:00 | Goricanec–Hüberli (Switzerland) | 2–1 | (Austria) Schützenhöfer–Plesiutschnig | 21–19 | 12–21 | 15–13 | 48–53 | |
| 30 Jul | 17:00 | Arvaniti2–0Tsiartsiani (Greece) | 2–0 | (Poland) Baran–Gruszczyńska | 21–15 | 27–25 | | 48–40 | |
| 30 Jul | 17:00 | Heidrich–Zumkehr (Switzerland) | 2–0 | (Spain) Lobato–Soria | 21–19 | 21–18 | | 42–37 | |
| 30 Jul | 17:00 | Giombini–Toti (Italy) | 2–1 | (Finland) Hasu–Parkkinen | 19–21 | 21–17 | 15–10 | 55–48 | |
| 30 Jul | 18:00 | Borger–Büthe (Germany) | – | (Austria) Rimser–Strauss | forfeit | | | | |
| 30 Jul | 18:00 | Holtwick–Semmler (Germany) | 2–1 | (Russia) Syrtseva–Prokopeva | 15–21 | 21–16 | 15–13 | 51–50 | |
| 30 Jul | 18:00 | Ukolova–Birlova (Russia) | 2–0 | (Lithuania) Dumbauskaite–Povilaityte | 21–16 | 21–16 | | 42–32 | |

==== Round of 16 ====
| Date | Time | | Score | | Set 1 | Set 2 | Set 3 | Total | Report |
|---|---|---|---|---|---|---|---|---|---|
| 31 Jul | 10:00 | Meppelink–Van Iersel (Netherlands) | 0–2 | (Slovakia) Dubovcova–Nestarcova | 19–21 | 18–21 | | 37–42 | |
| 31 Jul | 10:00 | Schwaiger–Hansel (Austria) | 1–2 | (Switzerland) Goricanec–Hüberli | 21–14 | 17–21 | 11–15 | 49–50 | |
| 31 Jul | 10:00 | Liliana–Baquerizo (Spain) | 1–2 | (Greece) Arvaniti–Tsiartsiani | 21–16 | 21–23 | 10–15 | 52–54 | |
| 31 Jul | 10:00 | Ludwig–Walkenhorst (Germany) | 2–0 | (Switzerland) Heidrich–Zumkehr | 21–12 | 21–17 | | 42–29 | |
| 31 Jul | 09:00 | Forrer–Vergé-Dépré (Switzerland) | 2–0 | (Italy) Giombini–Toti | 21–10 | 21–17 | | 42–27 | |
| 31 Jul | 09:00 | Kołosińska–Brzostek (Poland) | 2–1 | (Austria) Rimser–Strauss | 16–21 | 21–8 | 15–6 | 52–35 | |
| 31 Jul | 09:00 | Laboureur–Sude (Germany) | 2–1 | (Germany) Holtwick–Semmler | 21–18 | 19–21 | 19–17 | 59–56 | |
| 31 Jul | 09:00 | Jupiter–Longuet (France) | 0–2 | (Russia) Ukolova–Birlova | 16–21 | 16–21 | | 32–42 | |

==== Quarterfinals ====
| Date | Time | | Score | | Set 1 | Set 2 | Set 3 | Total | Report |
|---|---|---|---|---|---|---|---|---|---|
| 31 Jul | 15:00 | Laboureur–Sude (Germany) | 0–2 | (Russia) Ukolova–Birlova | 31–33 | 16–21 | | 47–54 | |
| 31 Jul | 16:00 | Arvaniti–Tsiartsiani (Greece) | 0–2 | (Germany) Ludwig–Walkenhorst | 19–21 | 12–21 | | 31–42 | |
| 31 Jul | 17:00 | Forrer–Vergé-Dépré (Switzerland) | 0–2 | (Poland) Kołosińska–Brzostek | 16–21 | 17–21 | | 33–42 | |
| 31 Jul | 18:00 | Dubovcova–Nestarcova (Slovakia) | 2–0 | (Switzerland) Goricanec–Hüberli | 21–19 | 21–13 | | 42–32 | |

==== Semifinals ====
| Date | Time | | Score | | Set 1 | Set 2 | Set 3 | Total | Report |
|---|---|---|---|---|---|---|---|---|---|
| 01 Aug | 10:00 | Dubovcova–Nestarcova (Slovakia) | 0–2 | (Germany) Ludwig–Walkenhorst | 18–21 | 18–21 | | 36–42 | |
| 01 Aug | 9:00 | Kołosińska–Brzostek (Poland) | 0–2 | (Russia) Ukolova–Birlova | 17–21 | 13–21 | | 30–42 | |

==== Third place game ====
| Date | Time | | Score | | Set 1 | Set 2 | Set 3 | Total | Report |
|---|---|---|---|---|---|---|---|---|---|
| 01 Aug | 13:00 | Dubovcova–Nestarcova (Slovakia) | 0–2 | (Poland) Kołosińska–Brzostek | 17–21 | 20–22 | | 37–43 | |

==== Final ====
| Date | Time | | Score | | Set 1 | Set 2 | Set 3 | Total | Report |
|---|---|---|---|---|---|---|---|---|---|
| 01 Aug | 14:00 | Ludwig–Walkenhorst (Germany) | 2–0 | (Russia) Ukolova–Birlova | 21–18 | 21–18 | | 42–36 | |
