= 2015 Beach Volleyball World Championships – Men's tournament =

Tournament details
- Host country: Netherlands
- Dates: 26 June to 5 July 2015
- Teams: 48 (from 5 confederations)

Final positions
- Champions: Brazil; Alison Cerutti; Bruno Oscar Schmidt (1st title)
- Runners-up: Netherlands; Reinder Nummerdor; Christiaan Varenhorst
- Third place: Brazil; Pedro Solberg; Evandro Oliveira
- Fourth place: United States; Nick Lucena; Theo Brunner

The men's tournament was held from 26 June to 5 July 2015.

== Preliminary round ==
| Qualified for the Round of 32 as pool winners or runners-up |
| Qualified for the Round of 32 as one of the best four third-placed teams |
| Qualified for the Lucky Losers Playoffs |
| Eliminated |

=== Pool A ===
| Pos | Team | Pld | W | L | Pts | SW | SL | SR | SPW | SPL | SPR | Qualification |
|---|---|---|---|---|---|---|---|---|---|---|---|---|
| 1 | (Netherlands) Nummerdor–Varenhorst | 3 | 3 | 0 | 6 | 6 | 2 | 3.000 | 147 | 129 | 1.140 | Round of 32 |
| 2 | (Cuba) González–Nivaldo | 3 | 2 | 1 | 5 | 5 | 3 | 1.667 | 151 | 133 | 1.135 | Round of 32 |
| 3 | (Poland) Kądzioła–Szałankiewicz | 3 | 1 | 2 | 4 | 4 | 4 | 1.000 | 140 | 123 | 1.138 | Round of 32 |
| 4 | (El Salvador) Tato–Pepe | 3 | 0 | 3 | 3 | 0 | 6 | 0.000 | 74 | 127 | 0.583 | |

| Date | Time | | Score | | Set 1 | Set 2 | Set 3 | Total | Report |
|---|---|---|---|---|---|---|---|---|---|
| 26 Jun | 20:30 | Nummerdor–Varenhorst (Netherlands) | 2–0 | (El Salvador) Tato–Pepe | 21–13 | 21–13 | | 42–26 | Report |
| 27 Jun | 16:30 | Kądzioła–Szałankiewicz (Poland) | 1–2 | (Cuba) González–Nivaldo | 22–20 | 13–21 | 12–15 | 47–56 | Report |
| 28 Jun | 19:45 | Nummerdor–Varenhorst (Netherlands) | 2–1 | (Poland) Kądzioła–Szałankiewicz | 21–18 | 14–21 | 15–12 | 50–51 | Report |
| 29 Jun | 13:30 | Tato–Pepe (El Salvador) | 0–2 | (Cuba) González–Nivaldo | 11–21 | 20–22 | | 31–43 | Report |
| 30 Jun | 17:45 | Kądzioła–Szałankiewicz (Poland) | 2–0 | (El Salvador) Tato–Pepe | 21–6 | 21–11 | | 42–17 | Report |
| 30 Jun | 19:45 | Nummerdor–Varenhorst (Netherlands) | 2–1 | (Cuba) González–Nivaldo | 21–17 | 18–21 | 16–14 | 55–52 | Report |

=== Pool B ===
| Pos | Team | Pld | W | L | Pts | SW | SL | SR | SPW | SPL | SPR | Qualification |
|---|---|---|---|---|---|---|---|---|---|---|---|---|
| 1 | (United States) Doherty–Mayer | 3 | 3 | 0 | 6 | 6 | 1 | 6.000 | 138 | 113 | 1.221 | Round of 32 |
| 2 | (Australia) Kapa–McHugh | 3 | 2 | 1 | 5 | 4 | 2 | 2.000 | 117 | 108 | 1.083 | Round of 32 |
| 3 | (New Zealand) Watson–O'Dea | 3 | 1 | 2 | 4 | 2 | 4 | 0.500 | 112 | 123 | 0.911 | |
| 4 | (Kazakhstan) Sidorenko–Dyachenko | 3 | 0 | 3 | 3 | 1 | 6 | 0.167 | 120 | 143 | 0.839 | |

| Date | Time | | Score | | Set 1 | Set 2 | Set 3 | Total | Report |
|---|---|---|---|---|---|---|---|---|---|
| 27 Jun | 12:00 | Kapa–McHugh (Australia) | 2–0 | (Kazakhstan) Sidorenko–Dyachenko | 21–18 | 21–12 | | 42–30 | Report |
| 27 Jun | 21:00 | Doherty–Mayer (United States) | 2–0 | (New Zealand) Watson–O'Dea | 21–16 | 21–13 | | 42–29 | Report |
| 28 Jun | 13:00 | Kapa–McHugh (Australia) | 2–0 | (New Zealand) Watson–O'Dea | 21–19 | 21–17 | | 42–36 | Report |
| 28 Jun | 21:00 | Doherty–Mayer (United States) | 2–1 | (Kazakhstan) Sidorenko–Dyachenko | 21–15 | 16–21 | 17–15 | 54–51 | Report |
| 29 Jun | 12:00 | Sidorenko–Dyachenko (Kazakhstan) | 0–2 | (New Zealand) Watson–O'Dea | 24–26 | 15–21 | | 39–47 | Report |
| 29 Jun | 21:00 | Doherty–Mayer (United States) | 2–0 | (Australia) Kapa–McHugh | 21–14 | 21–19 | | 42–33 | Report |

=== Pool C ===
| Pos | Team | Pld | W | L | Pts | SW | SL | SR | SPW | SPL | SPR | Qualification |
|---|---|---|---|---|---|---|---|---|---|---|---|---|
| 1 | (Brazil) Alison–Bruno | 3 | 3 | 0 | 6 | 6 | 1 | 6.000 | 143 | 118 | 1.212 | Round of 32 |
| 2 | (Austria) Doppler–Horst | 3 | 1 | 2 | 4 | 3 | 4 | 0.750 | 124 | 117 | 1.060 | Round of 32 |
| 3 | (Qatar) Jefferson–Cherif | 3 | 1 | 2 | 4 | 3 | 5 | 0.600 | 143 | 155 | 0.923 | Round of 32 |
| 4 | (Australia) Court–Schumann | 3 | 1 | 2 | 4 | 2 | 4 | 0.500 | 107 | 127 | 0.843 | |

| Date | Time | | Score | | Set 1 | Set 2 | Set 3 | Total | Report |
|---|---|---|---|---|---|---|---|---|---|
| 27 Jun | 14:00 | Alison–Bruno (Brazil) | 2–0 | (Australia) Court–Schumann | 21–17 | 21–18 | | 42–35 | Report |
| 27 Jun | 15:00 | Doppler–Horst (Austria) | 1–2 | (Qatar) Jefferson–Cherif | 21–14 | 15–21 | 13–15 | 49–50 | Report |
| 28 Jun | 13:00 | Doppler–Horst (Austria) | 2–0 | (Australia) Court–Schumann | 21–13 | 21–12 | | 42–25 | Report |
| 28 Jun | 21:00 | Alison–Bruno (Brazil) | 2–1 | (Qatar) Jefferson–Cherif | 23–25 | 21–14 | 15–11 | 59–50 | Report |
| 29 Jun | 12:00 | Jefferson–Cherif (Qatar) | 0–2 | (Australia) Court–Schumann | 19–21 | 24–26 | | 43–47 | Report |
| 29 Jun | 18:00 | Alison–Bruno (Brazil) | 2–0 | (Austria) Doppler–Horst | 21–19 | 21–14 | | 42–33 | Report |

=== Pool D ===
| Pos | Team | Pld | W | L | Pts | SW | SL | SR | SPW | SPL | SPR | Qualification |
|---|---|---|---|---|---|---|---|---|---|---|---|---|
| 1 | (Poland) Fijałek–Prudel | 3 | 2 | 1 | 5 | 4 | 2 | 2.000 | 127 | 91 | 1.396 | Round of 32 |
| 2 | (Venezuela) Henríquez–Fañe | 3 | 2 | 1 | 5 | 4 | 2 | 2.000 | 116 | 91 | 1.275 | Round of 32 |
| 3 | (Canada) Binstock–Schachter | 3 | 2 | 1 | 5 | 4 | 2 | 2.000 | 123 | 105 | 1.171 | Round of 32 |
| 4 | (Egypt) Usama–Ayman | 3 | 0 | 3 | 3 | 0 | 6 | 0.000 | 37 | 136 | 0.272 | |

| Date | Time | | Score | | Set 1 | Set 2 | Set 3 | Total | Report |
|---|---|---|---|---|---|---|---|---|---|
| 27 Jun | 13:00 | Fijałek–Prudel (Poland) | 2–0 | (Egypt) Usama–Ayman | 21–2 | 21–9 | | 42–11 | Report |
| 27 Jun | 19:00 | Binstock–Schachter (Canada) | 0–2 | (Venezuela) Henríquez–Fañe | 17–21 | 16–21 | | 33–42 | Report |
| 28 Jun | 13:00 | Binstock–Schachter (Canada) | 2–0 | (Egypt) Usama–Ayman | 21–10 | 21–10 | | 42–20 | Report |
| 28 Jun | 21:00 | Fijałek–Prudel (Poland) | 2–0 | (Venezuela) Henríquez–Fañe | 21–17 | 21–15 | | 42–32 | Report |
| 30 Jun | 18:00 | Henríquez–Fañe (Venezuela) | 2–0 | (Egypt) Usama–Ayman | 21–10 | 21–6 | | 42–16 | Report |
| 30 Jun | 20:00 | Fijałek–Prudel (Poland) | 0–2 | (Canada) Binstock–Schachter | 25–27 | 18–21 | | 43–48 | Report |

=== Pool E ===
| Pos | Team | Pld | W | L | Pts | SW | SL | SR | SPW | SPL | SPR | Qualification |
|---|---|---|---|---|---|---|---|---|---|---|---|---|
| 1 | (Netherlands) Brouwer–Meeuwsen | 3 | 3 | 0 | 6 | 6 | 0 | MAX | 127 | 96 | 1.323 | Round of 32 |
| 2 | (Italy) Nicolai–Lupo | 3 | 2 | 1 | 5 | 4 | 2 | 2.000 | 122 | 96 | 1.271 | Round of 32 |
| 3 | (Austria) Huber–Seidl | 3 | 1 | 2 | 4 | 2 | 4 | 0.500 | 102 | 110 | 0.927 | |
| 4 | (Chile) Salinas–Tobar | 3 | 0 | 3 | 3 | 0 | 6 | 0.000 | 77 | 126 | 0.611 | |

| Date | Time | | Score | | Set 1 | Set 2 | Set 3 | Total | Report |
|---|---|---|---|---|---|---|---|---|---|
| 27 Jun | 16:00 | Nicolai–Lupo (Italy) | 2–0 | (Chile) Salinas–Tobar | 21–14 | 21–11 | | 42–25 | Report |
| 27 Jun | 20:00 | Brouwer–Meeuwsen (Netherlands) | 2–0 | (Austria) Huber–Seidl | 21–16 | 21–16 | | 42–32 | Report |
| 28 Jun | 11:00 | Nicolai–Lupo (Italy) | 2–0 | (Austria) Huber–Seidl | 21–14 | 21–14 | | 42–28 | Report |
| 28 Jun | 12:00 | Brouwer–Meeuwsen (Netherlands) | 2–0 | (Chile) Salinas–Tobar | 21–12 | 21–14 | | 42–26 | Report |
| 29 Jun | 12:00 | Huber–Seidl (Austria) | 2–0 | (Chile) Salinas–Tobar | 21–11 | 21–15 | | 42–26 | Report |
| 29 Jun | 20:00 | Nicolai–Lupo (Italy) | 0–2 | (Netherlands) Brouwer–Meeuwsen | 20–22 | 18–21 | | 38–43 | Report |

=== Pool F ===
| Pos | Team | Pld | W | L | Pts | SW | SL | SR | SPW | SPL | SPR | Qualification |
|---|---|---|---|---|---|---|---|---|---|---|---|---|
| 1 | (Latvia) Samoilovs–Pļaviņš | 3 | 3 | 0 | 6 | 6 | 1 | 6.000 | 144 | 125 | 1.152 | Round of 32 |
| 2 | (Netherlands) Van Dorsten–Van de Velde | 3 | 2 | 1 | 5 | 4 | 4 | 1.000 | 148 | 155 | 0.955 | Round of 32 |
| 3 | (Chile) Grimalt–Grimalt | 3 | 1 | 2 | 4 | 4 | 5 | 0.800 | 156 | 159 | 0.981 | Round of 32 |
| 4 | (Russia) Koshkarev–Barsouk | 3 | 0 | 3 | 3 | 2 | 6 | 0.333 | 150 | 159 | 0.943 | |

| Date | Time | | Score | | Set 1 | Set 2 | Set 3 | Total | Report |
|---|---|---|---|---|---|---|---|---|---|
| 27 Jun | 12:00 | Grimalt–Grimalt (Chile) | 1–2 | (Netherlands) Van Dorsten–Van de Velde | 21–16 | 19–21 | 13–15 | 53–52 | Report |
| 27 Jun | 13:00 | Samoilovs–Pļaviņš (Latvia) | 2–0 | (Russia) Koshkarev–Barsouk | 21–18 | 24–22 | | 45–40 | Report |
| 28 Jun | 16:00 | Samoilovs–Pļaviņš (Latvia) | 2–0 | (Netherlands) Van Dorsten–Van de Velde | 21–17 | 23–21 | | 44–38 | Report |
| 28 Jun | 18:00 | Grimalt–Grimalt (Chile) | 2–1 | (Russia) Koshkarev–Barsouk | 22–20 | 19–21 | 15–11 | 56–52 | Report |
| 30 Jun | 17:00 | Samoilovs–Pļaviņš (Latvia) | 2–1 | (Chile) Grimalt–Grimalt | 19–21 | 21–19 | 15–7 | 55–47 | Report |
| 30 Jun | 19:00 | Van Dorsten–Van de Velde (Netherlands) | 2–1 | (Russia) Koshkarev–Barsouk | 17–21 | 22–20 | 19–17 | 58–58 | Report |

=== Pool G ===
| Pos | Team | Pld | W | L | Pts | SW | SL | SR | SPW | SPL | SPR | Qualification |
|---|---|---|---|---|---|---|---|---|---|---|---|---|
| 1 | (Brazil) Emanuel–Ricardo | 3 | 3 | 0 | 6 | 6 | 1 | 6.000 | 143 | 116 | 1.233 | Round of 32 |
| 2 | (Spain) Herrera–Gavira | 3 | 2 | 1 | 5 | 4 | 2 | 2.000 | 124 | 103 | 1.204 | Round of 32 |
| 3 | (Russia) Stoyanovskiy–Yarzutkin | 3 | 1 | 2 | 4 | 3 | 4 | 0.750 | 126 | 125 | 1.008 | Round of 32 |
| 4 | (Ghana) Ajanako–Scott | 3 | 0 | 3 | 3 | 0 | 6 | 0.000 | 77 | 126 | 0.611 | |

| Date | Time | | Score | | Set 1 | Set 2 | Set 3 | Total | Report |
|---|---|---|---|---|---|---|---|---|---|
| 27 Jun | 14:00 | Herrera–Gavira (Spain) | 2–0 | (Russia) Stoyanovskiy–Yarzutkin | 21–15 | 21–19 | | 42–34 | Report |
| 27 Jun | 19:00 | Emanuel–Ricardo (Brazil) | 2–0 | (Ghana) Ajanako–Scott | 21–10 | 21–16 | | 42–26 | Report |
| 28 Jun | 12:00 | Herrera–Gavira (Spain) | 2–0 | (Ghana) Ajanako–Scott | 21–10 | 21–14 | | 42–24 | Report |
| 28 Jun | 16:00 | Emanuel–Ricardo (Brazil) | 2–1 | (Russia) Stoyanovskiy–Yarzutkin | 17–21 | 21–13 | 18–16 | 56–50 | Report |
| 30 Jun | 17:00 | Stoyanovskiy–Yarzutkin (Russia) | 2–0 | (Ghana) Ajanako–Scott | 21–11 | 21–16 | | 42–27 | Report |
| 30 Jun | 18:00 | Emanuel–Ricardo (Brazil) | 2–0 | (Spain) Herrera–Gavira | 24–22 | 21–18 | | 45–40 | Report |

=== Pool H ===
| Pos | Team | Pld | W | L | Pts | SW | SL | SR | SPW | SPL | SPR | Qualification |
|---|---|---|---|---|---|---|---|---|---|---|---|---|
| 1 | (Germany) Erdmann–Matysik | 3 | 3 | 0 | 6 | 6 | 1 | 6.000 | 145 | 114 | 1.272 | Round of 32 |
| 2 | (Canada) Saxton–Schalk | 3 | 2 | 1 | 5 | 4 | 2 | 2.000 | 117 | 92 | 1.272 | Round of 32 |
| 3 | (France) Krou–Rowlandson | 3 | 1 | 2 | 4 | 3 | 4 | 0.750 | 125 | 137 | 0.912 | Round of 32 |
| 4 | (South Africa) Goldschmidt–Williams | 3 | 0 | 3 | 3 | 0 | 6 | 0.000 | 82 | 126 | 0.651 | |

| Date | Time | | Score | | Set 1 | Set 2 | Set 3 | Total | Report |
|---|---|---|---|---|---|---|---|---|---|
| 28 Jun | 11:30 | Erdmann–Matysik (Germany) | 2–0 | (South Africa) Goldschmidt–Williams | 21–13 | 21–13 | | 42–26 | Report |
| 28 Jun | 18:45 | Saxton–Schalk (Canada) | 2–0 | (France) Krou–Rowlandson | 21–14 | 21–14 | | 42–28 | Report |
| 29 Jun | 11:30 | Erdmann–Matysik (Germany) | 2–1 | (France) Krou–Rowlandson | 24–26 | 21–15 | 16–14 | 61–55 | Report |
| 29 Jun | 14:30 | Saxton–Schalk (Canada) | 2–0 | (South Africa) Goldschmidt–Williams | 21–10 | 21–12 | | 42–22 | Report |
| 30 Jun | 18:45 | Krou–Rowlandson (France) | 2–0 | (South Africa) Goldschmidt–Williams | 21–18 | 21–16 | | 42–34 | Report |
| 30 Jun | 20:45 | Erdmann–Matysik (Germany) | 2–0 | (Canada) Saxton–Schalk | 21–19 | 21–14 | | 42–33 | Report |

=== Pool I ===
| Pos | Team | Pld | W | L | Pts | SW | SL | SR | SPW | SPL | SPR | Qualification |
|---|---|---|---|---|---|---|---|---|---|---|---|---|
| 1 | (United States) Hyden–Bourne | 3 | 3 | 0 | 6 | 6 | 0 | MAX | 131 | 93 | 1.409 | Round of 32 |
| 2 | (Switzerland) Gabathuler–Gerson | 3 | 2 | 1 | 5 | 4 | 2 | 2.000 | 111 | 101 | 1.099 | Round of 32 |
| 3 | (Netherlands) Elferink–Spijkers | 3 | 1 | 2 | 4 | 2 | 5 | 0.400 | 108 | 137 | 0.788 | |
| 4 | (Puerto Rico) Rodríguez–Haddock | 3 | 0 | 3 | 3 | 1 | 6 | 0.167 | 122 | 141 | 0.865 | |

| Date | Time | | Score | | Set 1 | Set 2 | Set 3 | Total | Report |
|---|---|---|---|---|---|---|---|---|---|
| 27 Jun | 19:45 | Hyden–Bourne (United States) | 2–0 | (Netherlands) Elferink–Spijkers | 21–9 | 21–14 | | 42–23 | Report |
| 27 Jun | 21:45 | Gabathuler–Gerson (Switzerland) | 2–0 | (Puerto Rico) Rodríguez–Haddock | 21–15 | 21–11 | | 42–26 | Report |
| 28 Jun | 16:30 | Gabathuler–Gerson (Switzerland) | 2–0 | (Netherlands) Elferink–Spijkers | 21–16 | 21–17 | | 42–33 | Report |
| 28 Jun | 21:45 | Hyden–Bourne (United States) | 2–0 | (Puerto Rico) Rodríguez–Haddock | 26–24 | 21–19 | | 47–43 | Report |
| 29 Jun | 18:45 | Hyden–Bourne (United States) | 2–0 | (Switzerland) Gabathuler–Gerson | 21–15 | 21–12 | | 42–27 | Report |
| 29 Jun | 20:45 | Rodríguez–Haddock (Puerto Rico) | 1–2 | (Netherlands) Elferink–Spijkers | 19–21 | 21–16 | 13–15 | 53–52 | Report |

=== Pool J ===
| Pos | Team | Pld | W | L | Pts | SW | SL | SR | SPW | SPL | SPR | Qualification |
|---|---|---|---|---|---|---|---|---|---|---|---|---|
| 1 | (United States) Lucena–Brunner | 3 | 3 | 0 | 6 | 6 | 0 | MAX | 128 | 87 | 1.471 | Round of 32 |
| 2 | (Russia) Semenov–Krasilnikov | 3 | 2 | 1 | 5 | 4 | 2 | 2.000 | 118 | 101 | 1.168 | Round of 32 |
| 3 | (Netherlands) Keemink–Vismans | 3 | 1 | 2 | 4 | 2 | 5 | 0.400 | 109 | 135 | 0.807 | |
| 4 | (Kazakhstan) Yakovlev–Kuleshov | 3 | 0 | 3 | 3 | 1 | 6 | 0.167 | 106 | 138 | 0.768 | |

| Date | Time | | Score | | Set 1 | Set 2 | Set 3 | Total | Report |
|---|---|---|---|---|---|---|---|---|---|
| 27 Jun | 16:00 | Lucena–Brunner (United States) | 2–0 | (Kazakhstan) Yakovlev–Kuleshov | 21–10 | 21–14 | | 42–24 | Report |
| 27 Jun | 20:00 | Semenov–Krasilnikov (Russia) | 2–0 | (Netherlands) Keemink–Vismans | 21–12 | 21–14 | | 42–26 | Report |
| 29 Jun | 18:00 | Semenov–Krasilnikov (Russia) | 2–0 | (Kazakhstan) Yakovlev–Kuleshov | 21–17 | 21–14 | | 42–31 | Report |
| 29 Jun | 19:00 | Lucena–Brunner (United States) | 2–0 | (Netherlands) Keemink–Vismans | 21–16 | 21–13 | | 42–29 | Report |
| 30 Jun | 19:00 | Semenov–Krasilnikov (Russia) | 0–2 | (United States) Lucena–Brunner | 21–23 | 13–21 | | 34–44 | Report |
| 30 Jun | 20:00 | Yakovlev–Kuleshov (Kazakhstan) | 1–2 | (Netherlands) Keemink–Vismans | 16–21 | 21–17 | 14–16 | 51–54 | Report |

=== Pool K ===
| Pos | Team | Pld | W | L | Pts | SW | SL | SR | SPW | SPL | SPR | Qualification |
|---|---|---|---|---|---|---|---|---|---|---|---|---|
| 1 | (United States) Gibb–Patterson | 3 | 3 | 0 | 6 | 6 | 3 | 2.000 | 163 | 139 | 1.173 | Round of 32 |
| 2 | (Spain) Marco–García | 3 | 2 | 1 | 5 | 5 | 4 | 1.250 | 155 | 151 | 1.026 | Round of 32 |
| 3 | (Brazil) Álvaro–Vitor | 3 | 1 | 2 | 4 | 4 | 4 | 1.000 | 131 | 139 | 0.942 | Round of 32 |
| 4 | (Argentina) Bianchi–Azaad | 3 | 0 | 3 | 3 | 2 | 6 | 0.333 | 129 | 149 | 0.866 | |

| Date | Time | | Score | | Set 1 | Set 2 | Set 3 | Total | Report |
|---|---|---|---|---|---|---|---|---|---|
| 27 Jun | 18:00 | Gibb–Patterson (United States) | 2–1 | (Spain) Marco–García | 18–21 | 22–20 | 15–10 | 55–51 | Report |
| 27 Jun | 20:00 | Álvaro–Vitor (Brazil) | 2–0 | (Argentina) Bianchi–Azaad | 21–16 | 21–18 | | 42–34 | Report |
| 29 Jun | 14:00 | Gibb–Patterson (United States) | 2–1 | (Argentina) Bianchi–Azaad | 19–21 | 21–15 | 15–9 | 55–45 | Report |
| 29 Jun | 15:00 | Álvaro–Vitor (Brazil) | 1–2 | (Spain) Marco–García | 13–21 | 21–16 | 13–15 | 46–52 | Report |
| 30 Jun | 18:00 | Marco–García (Spain) | 2–1 | (Argentina) Bianchi–Azaad | 16–21 | 21–19 | 15–10 | 52–50 | Report |
| 30 Jun | 20:00 | Álvaro–Vitor (Brazil) | 1–2 | (United States) Gibb–Patterson | 12–21 | 21–17 | 10–15 | 43–53 | Report |

=== Pool L ===
| Pos | Team | Pld | W | L | Pts | SW | SL | SR | SPW | SPL | SPR | Qualification |
|---|---|---|---|---|---|---|---|---|---|---|---|---|
| 1 | (Mexico) Virgen–Ontiveros | 3 | 3 | 0 | 6 | 6 | 0 | MAX | 126 | 94 | 1.340 | Round of 32 |
| 2 | (Germany) Walkenhorst–Windscheif | 3 | 2 | 1 | 5 | 4 | 3 | 1.333 | 125 | 132 | 0.947 | Round of 32 |
| 3 | (Brazil) Pedro–Evandro | 3 | 1 | 2 | 4 | 3 | 4 | 0.750 | 122 | 108 | 1.130 | Round of 32 |
| 4 | (Tunisia) Naceur–Belhaj | 3 | 0 | 3 | 3 | 0 | 6 | 0.000 | 88 | 127 | 0.693 | |

| Date | Time | | Score | | Set 1 | Set 2 | Set 3 | Total | Report |
|---|---|---|---|---|---|---|---|---|---|
| 27 Jun | 14:00 | Walkenhorst–Windscheif (Germany) | 0–2 | (Mexico) Virgen–Ontiveros | 19–21 | 17–21 | | 36–42 | Report |
| 27 Jun | 21:00 | Pedro–Evandro (Brazil) | 2–0 | (Tunisia) Naceur–Belhaj | 21–11 | 21–9 | | 42–20 | Report |
| 29 Jun | 14:00 | Walkenhorst–Windscheif (Germany) | 2–0 | (Tunisia) Naceur–Belhaj | 22–20 | 21–19 | | 43–39 | Report |
| 29 Jun | 19:00 | Pedro–Evandro (Brazil) | 0–2 | (Mexico) Virgen–Ontiveros | 18–21 | 11–21 | | 29–42 | Report |
| 30 Jun | 17:00 | Virgen–Ontiveros (Mexico) | 2–0 | (Tunisia) Naceur–Belhaj | 21–13 | 21–16 | | 42–29 | Report |
| 30 Jun | 19:00 | Pedro–Evandro (Brazil) | 1–2 | (Germany) Walkenhorst–Windscheif | 21–10 | 18–21 | 12–15 | 51–46 | Report |

=== 3rd place ranked teams ===
The eight best third-placed teams advanced to the round of 32.

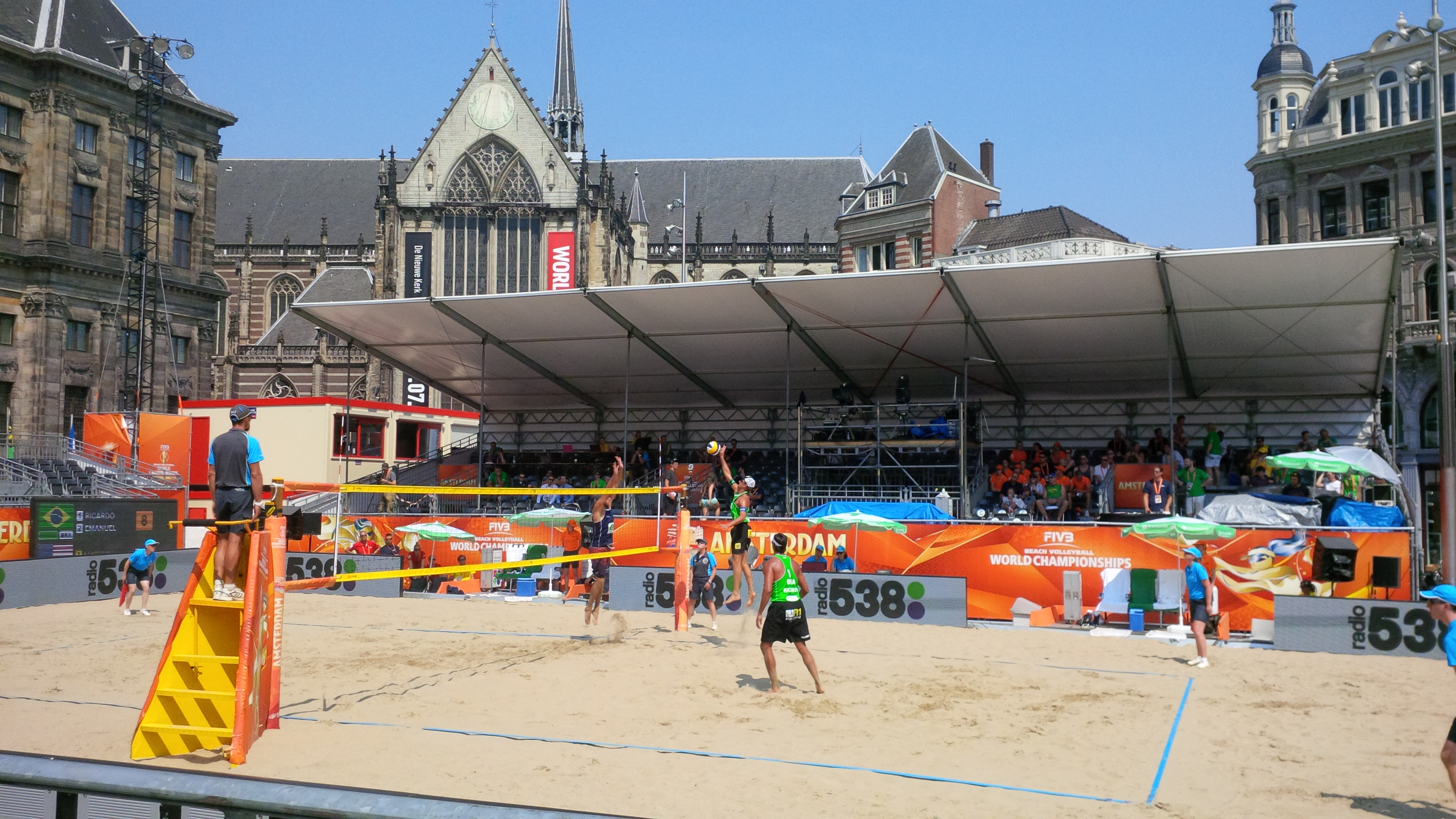
Round of 16: Lucena and Brunner against Emanuel and Ricardo at Dam Square in Amsterdam.

| Pos | Team | Pld | W | L | Pts | SW | SL | SR | SPW | SPL | SPR | Qualification |
|---|---|---|---|---|---|---|---|---|---|---|---|---|
| 1 | (Canada) Binstock–Schachter | 3 | 2 | 1 | 5 | 4 | 2 | 2.000 | 123 | 105 | 1.171 | Round of 32 |
| 2 | (Poland) Kądzioła–Szałankiewicz | 3 | 1 | 2 | 4 | 4 | 4 | 1.000 | 140 | 123 | 1.138 | Round of 32 |
| 3 | (Brazil) Álvaro–Vitor | 3 | 1 | 2 | 4 | 4 | 4 | 1.000 | 131 | 139 | 0.942 | Round of 32 |
| 4 | (Chile) Grimalt–Grimalt | 3 | 1 | 2 | 4 | 4 | 5 | 0.800 | 156 | 159 | 0.981 | Round of 32 |
| 5 | (Brazil) Pedro–Evandro | 3 | 1 | 2 | 4 | 3 | 4 | 0.750 | 122 | 108 | 1.130 | Round of 32 |
| 6 | (Russia) Stoyanovskiy–Yarzutkin | 3 | 1 | 2 | 4 | 3 | 4 | 0.750 | 126 | 125 | 1.008 | Round of 32 |
| 7 | (France) Krou–Rowlandson | 3 | 1 | 2 | 4 | 3 | 4 | 0.750 | 125 | 137 | 0.912 | Round of 32 |
| 8 | (Qatar) Jefferson–Cherif | 3 | 1 | 2 | 4 | 3 | 5 | 0.600 | 143 | 155 | 0.923 | Round of 32 |
| 9 | (Austria) Huber–Seidl | 3 | 1 | 2 | 4 | 2 | 4 | 0.500 | 102 | 110 | 0.927 | |
| 10 | (New Zealand) Watson–O'Dea | 3 | 1 | 2 | 4 | 2 | 4 | 0.500 | 112 | 123 | 0.911 | |
| 11 | (Netherlands) Keemink–Vismans | 3 | 1 | 2 | 4 | 2 | 5 | 0.400 | 109 | 135 | 0.807 | |
| 12 | (Netherlands) Elferink–Spijkers | 3 | 1 | 2 | 4 | 2 | 5 | 0.400 | 108 | 137 | 0.788 | |

== Knockout stage ==
A draw was held to determine the pairings.

=== Round of 32 ===
| Date | Time | | Score | | Set 1 | Set 2 | Set 3 | Total | Report |
|---|---|---|---|---|---|---|---|---|---|
| 1 Jul | 18:00 | Pedro–Evandro (Brazil) | 2–1 | (Poland) Fijałek–Prudel | 21–15 | 21–23 | 15–13 | 57–51 | Report |
| 1 Jul | 18:00 | Henríquez–Fañe (Venezuela) | 0–2 | (Australia) Kapa–McHugh | 12–21 | 15–21 | | 27–42 | Report |
| 1 Jul | 18:00 | Saxton–Schalk (Canada) | 1–2 | (Switzerland) Gabathuler–Gerson | 17–21 | 21–16 | 12–15 | 50–52 | Report |
| 1 Jul | 18:45 | Erdmann–Matysik (Germany) | 2–0 | (Chile) Grimalt–Grimalt | 21–17 | 21–15 | | 42–32 | Report |
| 1 Jul | 19:00 | Virgen–Ontiveros (Mexico) | 2–0 | (Netherlands) Van Dorsten–Van de Velde | 21–19 | 24–22 | | 45–41 | Report |
| 1 Jul | 19:00 | Alison–Bruno (Brazil) | 2–0 | (France) Krou–Rowlandson | 21–17 | 21–14 | | 42–31 | Report |
| 1 Jul | 19:00 | Jefferson–Cherif (Qatar) | 2–0 | (United States) Doherty–Mayer | 21–18 | 21–14 | | 42–32 | Report |
| 1 Jul | 19:45 | Nicolai–Lupo (Italy) | 1–2 | (Russia) Semenov–Krasilnikov | 21–17 | 18–21 | 14–16 | 53–54 | Report |
| 1 Jul | 20:00 | Brouwer–Meeuwsen (Netherlands) | 0–2 | (Brazil) Álvaro–Vitor | 19–21 | 23–25 | | 42–46 | Report |
| 1 Jul | 20:00 | Samoilovs–Pļaviņš (Latvia) | 1–2 | (Canada) Binstock–Schachter | 21–17 | 18–21 | 17–19 | 54–54 | Report |
| 1 Jul | 20:00 | Lucena–Brunner (United States) | 2–0 | (Germany) Walkenhorst–Windscheif | 21–18 | 21–15 | | 42–33 | Report |
| 1 Jul | 20:45 | Hyden–Bourne (United States) | 2–0 | (Spain) Marco–García | 21–13 | 21–18 | | 41–31 | Report |
| 1 Jul | 21:00 | Herrera–Gavira (Spain) | 0–2 | (Cuba) González–Nivaldo | 19–21 | 20–22 | | 39–43 | Report |
| 1 Jul | 21:00 | Gibb–Patterson (United States) | 2–0 | (Austria) Doppler–Horst | 21–16 | 22–20 | | 43–36 | Report |
| 1 Jul | 21:00 | Emanuel–Ricardo (Brazil) | 2–0 | (Poland) Kądzioła–Szałankiewicz | 21–13 | 23–21 | | 44–34 | Report |
| 1 Jul | 21:45 | Nummerdor–Varenhorst (Netherlands) | 2–0 | (Russia) Stoyanovskiy–Yarzutkin | 21–19 | 21–10 | | 42–29 | Report |

=== Round of 16 ===
| Date | Time | | Score | | Set 1 | Set 2 | Set 3 | Total | Report |
|---|---|---|---|---|---|---|---|---|---|
| 2 Jul | 12:00 | Gibb–Patterson (United States) | 2–0 | (Canada) Binstock–Schachter | 21–13 | 21–14 | | 42–27 | Report |
| 2 Jul | 12:00 | Emanuel–Ricardo (Brazil) | 1–2 | (United States) Lucena–Brunner | 21–18 | 18–21 | 11–15 | 50–54 | Report |
| 2 Jul | 13:00 | Alison–Bruno (Brazil) | 2–0 | (Australia) Kapa–McHugh | 21–15 | 21–17 | | 42–32 | Report |
| 2 Jul | 13:00 | Gabathuler–Gerson (Switzerland) | 0–2 | (Qatar) Jefferson–Cherif | 15–21 | 13–21 | | 28–42 | Report |
| 2 Jul | 14:00 | Álvaro–Vitor (Brazil) | 2–1 | (Mexico) Virgen–Ontiveros | 21–19 | 19–21 | 20–18 | 60–58 | Report |
| 2 Jul | 14:30 | Hyden–Bourne (United States) | 2–1 | (Germany) Erdmann–Matysik | 21–19 | 23–25 | 15–9 | 59–53 | Report |
| 2 Jul | 15:00 | González–Nivaldo (Cuba) | 1–2 | (Brazil) Pedro–Evandro | 19–21 | 21–19 | 11–15 | 51–55 | Report |
| 2 Jul | 15:30 | Nummerdor–Varenhorst (Netherlands) | 2–1 | (Russia) Semenov–Krasilnikov | 21–17 | 22–24 | 15–12 | 58–53 | Report |

=== Quarterfinals ===
| Date | Time | | Score | | Set 1 | Set 2 | Set 3 | Total | Report |
|---|---|---|---|---|---|---|---|---|---|
| 2 Jul | 19:00 | Alison–Bruno (Brazil) | 2–0 | (United States) Gibb–Patterson | 21–12 | 21–17 | | 42–39 | Report |
| 2 Jul | 19:00 | Lucena–Brunner (United States) | 2–0 | (Qatar) Jefferson–Cherif | 21–19 | 21–19 | | 42–38 | Report |
| 2 Jul | 20:00 | Álvaro–Vitor (Brazil) | 1–2 | (Brazil) Pedro–Evandro | 14–21 | 21–14 | 8–15 | 43–50 | Report |
| 2 Jul | 20:45 | Nummerdor–Varenhorst (Netherlands) | 2–0 | (United States) Hyden–Bourne | 23–21 | 23–21 | | 46–42 | Report |

=== Semifinals ===
| Date | Time | | Score | | Set 1 | Set 2 | Set 3 | Total | Report |
|---|---|---|---|---|---|---|---|---|---|
| 4 Jul | 12:00 | Nummerdor–Varenhorst (Netherlands) | 2–1 | (Brazil) Pedro–Evandro | 21–18 | 21–23 | 15–12 | 57–53 | Report |
| 4 Jul | 13:00 | Alison–Bruno (Brazil) | 2–0 | (United States) Lucena–Brunner | 21–17 | 21–15 | | 42–32 | Report |

=== Third place game ===
| Date | Time | | Score | | Set 1 | Set 2 | Set 3 | Total | Report |
|---|---|---|---|---|---|---|---|---|---|
| 5 Jul | 20:00 | Pedro–Evandro (Brazil) | 2–0 | (United States) Lucena–Brunner | 22–20 | 21–13 | | 43–33 | Report |

=== Final ===
| Date | Time | | Score | | Set 1 | Set 2 | Set 3 | Total | Report |
|---|---|---|---|---|---|---|---|---|---|
| 5 Jul | 21:00 | Nummerdor–Varenhorst (Netherlands) | 1–2 | (Brazil) Alison–Bruno | 21–12 | 14–21 | 20–22 | 55–55 | Report |
