= 2013 Beach Volleyball World Championships =

Beach volleyball double-gender event in Poland

2013 World Championship
- Location: Stare Jabłonki, Poland
- Dates: 1 July – 7 July
- Website: Official website

Champions
- Men: Netherlands; Alexander Brouwer; Robert Meeuwsen
- Women: China; Xue Chen; Zhang Xi

The 2013 FIVB Beach Volleyball Swatch World Championships was a beach volleyball double-gender event, held from 1 to 7 July 2013 in Stare Jabłonki, Poland. The FIVB Beach Volleyball World Championships are organized every two years, and Poland hosted the event for the first time. 48 teams per gender entered the competition making 96 total.

The match schedule was published on 20 June 2013.

== Medal summary ==
=== Medal events ===
Event	Gold	Silver	Bronze
Men's event	Alexander Brouwer and Robert Meeuwsen (NED)	Ricardo Santos and Álvaro Morais Filho (BRA)	Jonathan Erdmann and Kay Matysik (GER)
Women's event	Xue Chen and Zhang Xi (CHN)	Karla Borger and Britta Büthe (GER)	Liliane Maestrini and Bárbara Seixas (BRA)

=== Medal table ===
Rank	Nation	Gold	Silver	Bronze	Total
1	China	1	0	0	1
1	Netherlands	1	0	0	1
3	Brazil	0	1	1	2
3	Germany	0	1	1	2
Totals (4 entries)		2	2	2	6
