= Natália Dubovcová =

Slovak beach volleyball player

Natália Přidalová
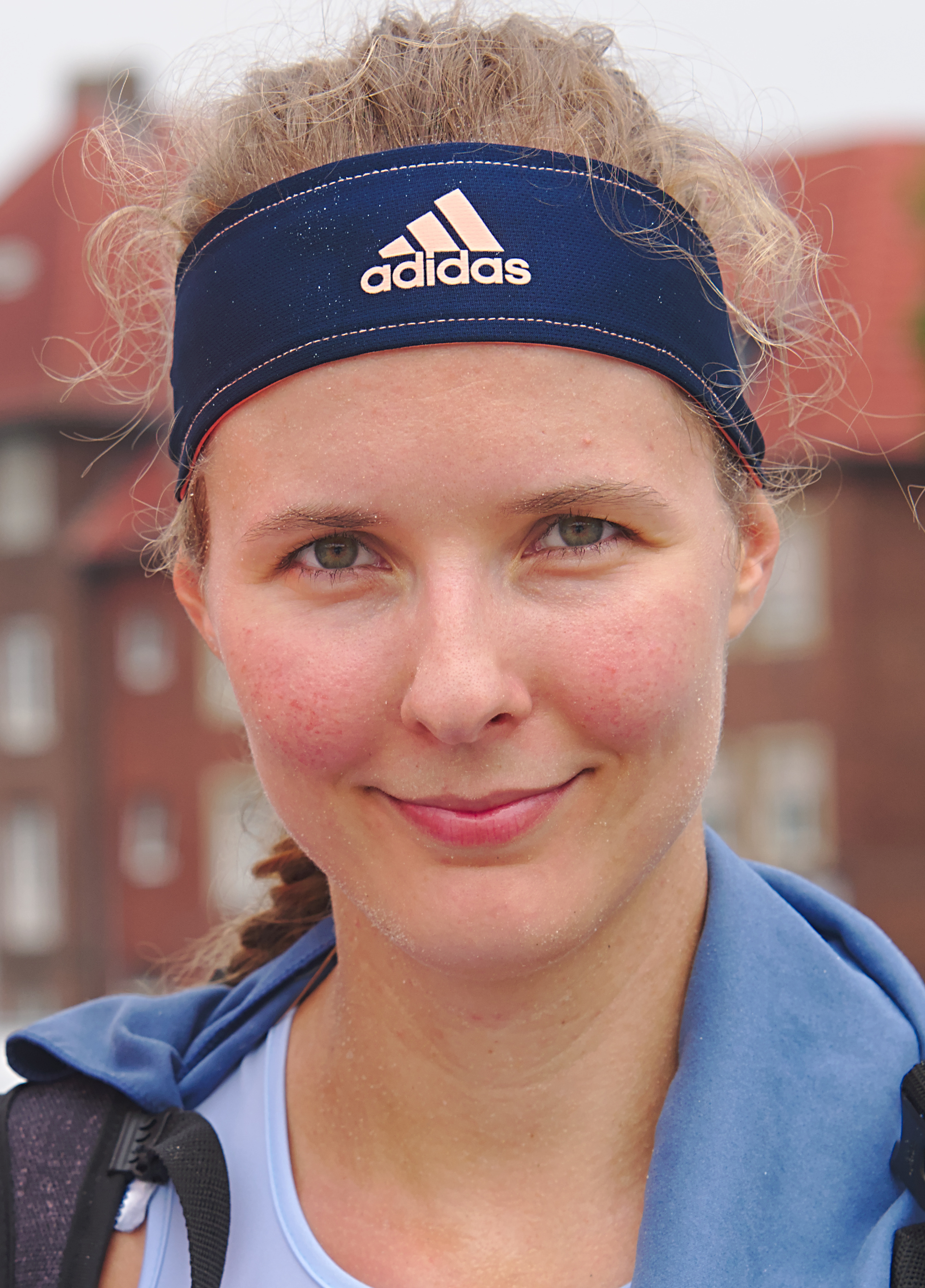
- Přidalová in 2018

Personal information
- Born: Natália Dubovcová; 5 July 1990 (age 36); Bratislava, Czechoslovakia
- Height: 1.88 m (6 ft 2 in)

Beach volleyball information
Years	Teammate
2009-2016; 2016; 2016-2019	Dominika Nestarcová; Nina Herelová; Andrea Štrbová

Natália Přidalová (née Dubovcová; born 5 July 1990) is a Slovak former beach volleyball player.

== Biography ==
Přidalová was born on 5 July 1990 in Bratislava. She originally played volleyball, but switched to beach volleyball at the age of 16.

Přidalová lives in Prague. In 2019 she married her long-term partner and changed her surname from her maiden name Dubovcová to Přidalová.

== Career ==
Following some successes in junior categories, Přidalová formed a duo with Dominika Nestarcová in 2009. They played together until 2016, when Nestarcová retired from the sport following the failure of the due to qualify for the 2016 Summer Olympics. Together, they achieved the third places at the Stavanger Grand Slam, a part of the 2014 FIVB Beach Volleyball World Tour and at the Olsztyn Grand Slam, of the 2016 FIVB Beach Volleyball World Tour. They also finished fourth at the 2015 European Beach Volleyball Championships in Klagenfurt.

Following the retirement of Nestarcová, Přidalová shortly played with Nina Herelová and from 2017 with Andrea Štrbová. They struggled to achieve international success and retired in 2019 after failing to qualify for the 2020 Summer Olympics and disputes with the Slovak Volleyball Federation over funding.
