= Alexandra Jupiter =

French volleyball player (born 1990)

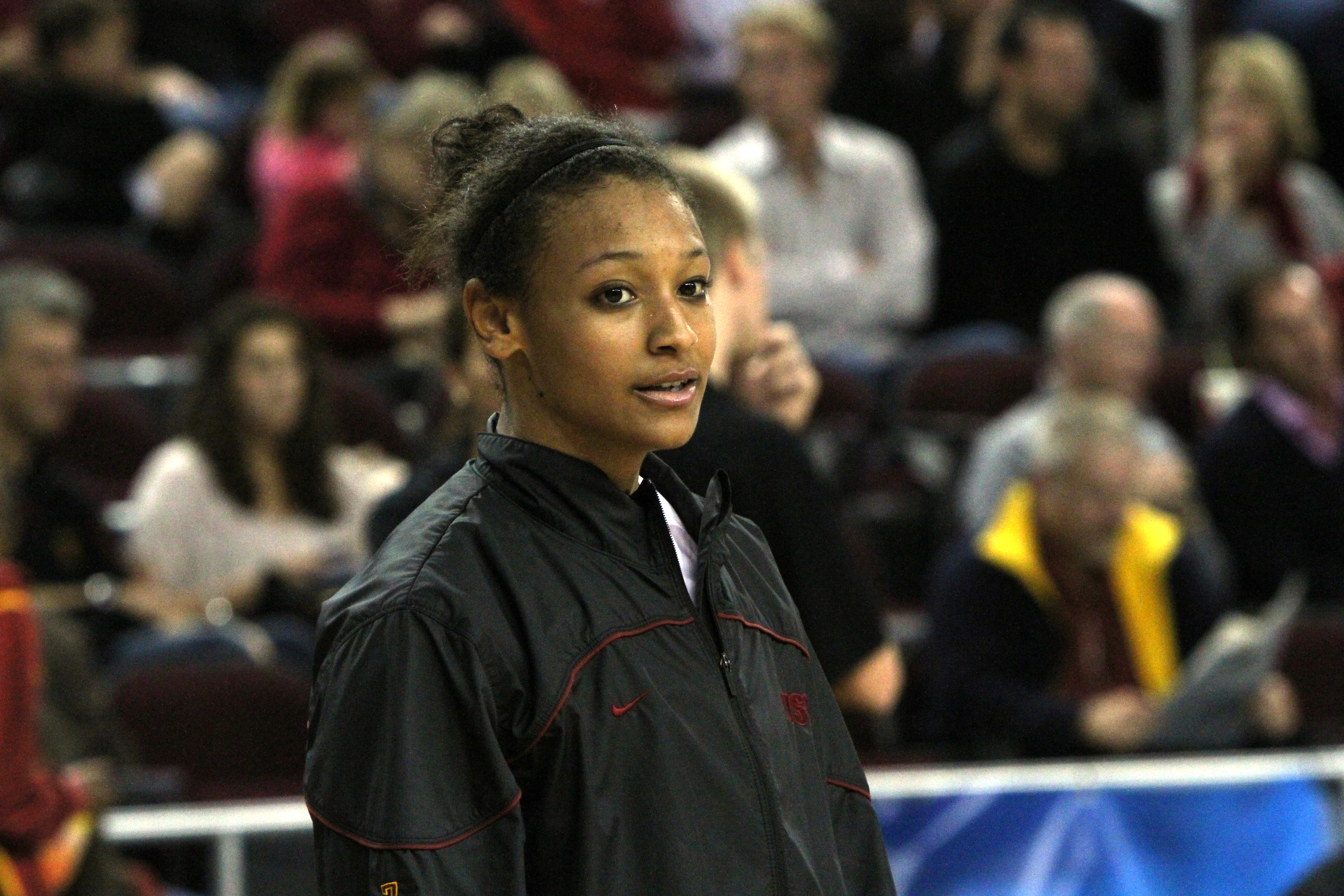

Personal information
- Nationality: French
- Born: 11 March 1990 (age 36)
- Height: 190 cm (6 ft 3 in)

Volleyball information
- Position: outside hitter
- Number: 7 (national team)

Career
Years	Teams
2013	Criollas de Caguas

National team
2013	France
Honours
Women's beach volleyball
Representing France
Mediterranean Games
Silver medal – second place	2018 Tarragona	Team

Alexandra Jupiter (born 11 March 1990) is a French female former volleyball and beach volleyball player, playing as an outside hitter. She was part of the France women's national volleyball team.

She competed at the 2013 Women's European Volleyball Championship. On club level she played for Criollas de Caguas.

As a beach volleyball player she competed with Laura Longuet at the 2015 European Beach Volleyball Championships.

== College ==
While at USC, she won the Honda Sports Award as the best female collegiate volleyball player in 2011–12.
