= Adrian Carambula =

Italian beach volleyball player (born 1988)

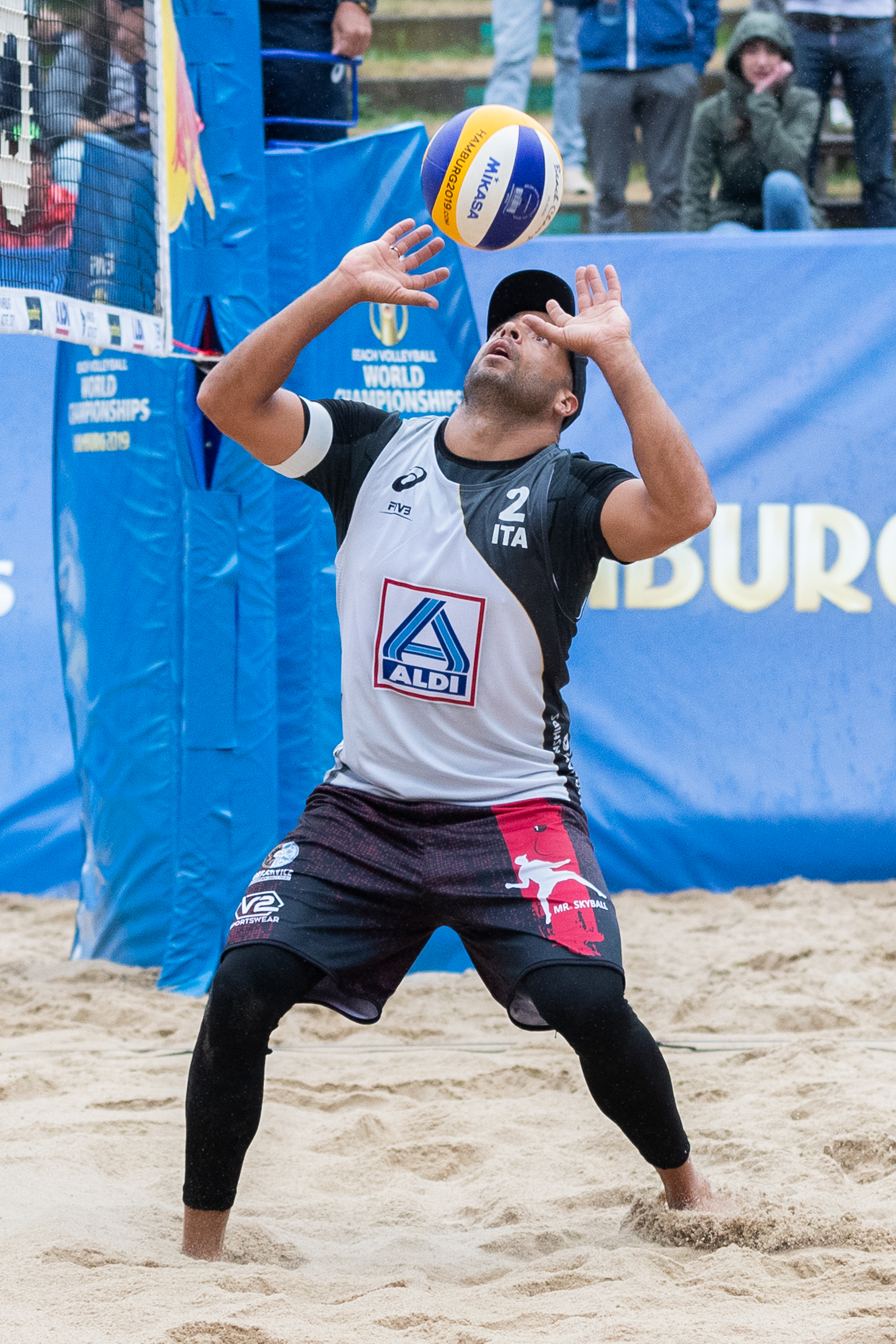
- Carambula in 2019

Personal information
- Full name: Adrian Ignacio Carambula Raurich
- Nationality: Italy
- Born: 16 March 1988 (age 38) Montevideo, Uruguay
- Height: 183 cm (6 ft 0 in)
- Weight: 84 kg (185 lb)
Honours
Men's beach volleyball
Representing Italy
European Championships
Silver medal – second place	2015 Klagenfurt	Beach

Adrian Ignacio Carambula Raurich (born 16 March 1988) is a Uruguay-born Italian beach volleyball player.

Born in Uruguay, he played football alongside Luis Suárez as a boy, until his family moved to Florida when he was a teenager. He qualifies to represent Italy through his maternal grandmother, originally from Turin.

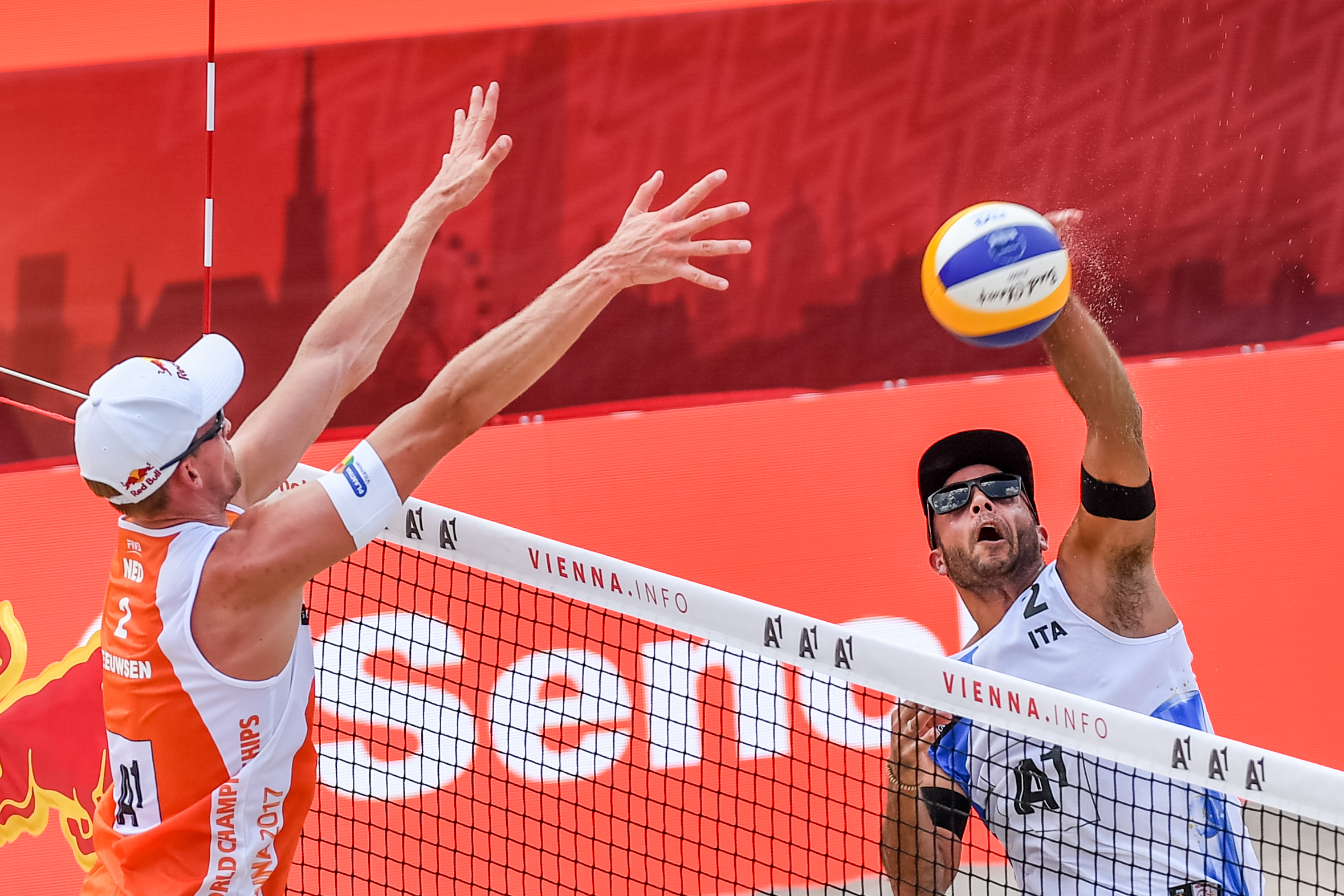
Carambula to spike during the 2017 World Championships.

He is known as "Mr Skyball" for his unique serving style, in which he hits the ball high. The theme from the James Bond film Skyfall plays when he serves.

Ranked third in the world as a pair, Carambula partnered Alex Ranghieri at the 2016 Olympics.

Since 2018, Carambula plays together with Enrico Rossi.

Awards
Preceded by Tri Bourne (USA)	Men's FIVB World Tour "Top Rookie"; 2015	Succeeded by Guto Carvalhaes (BRA)
