= Karla Borger =

German beach volleyball player

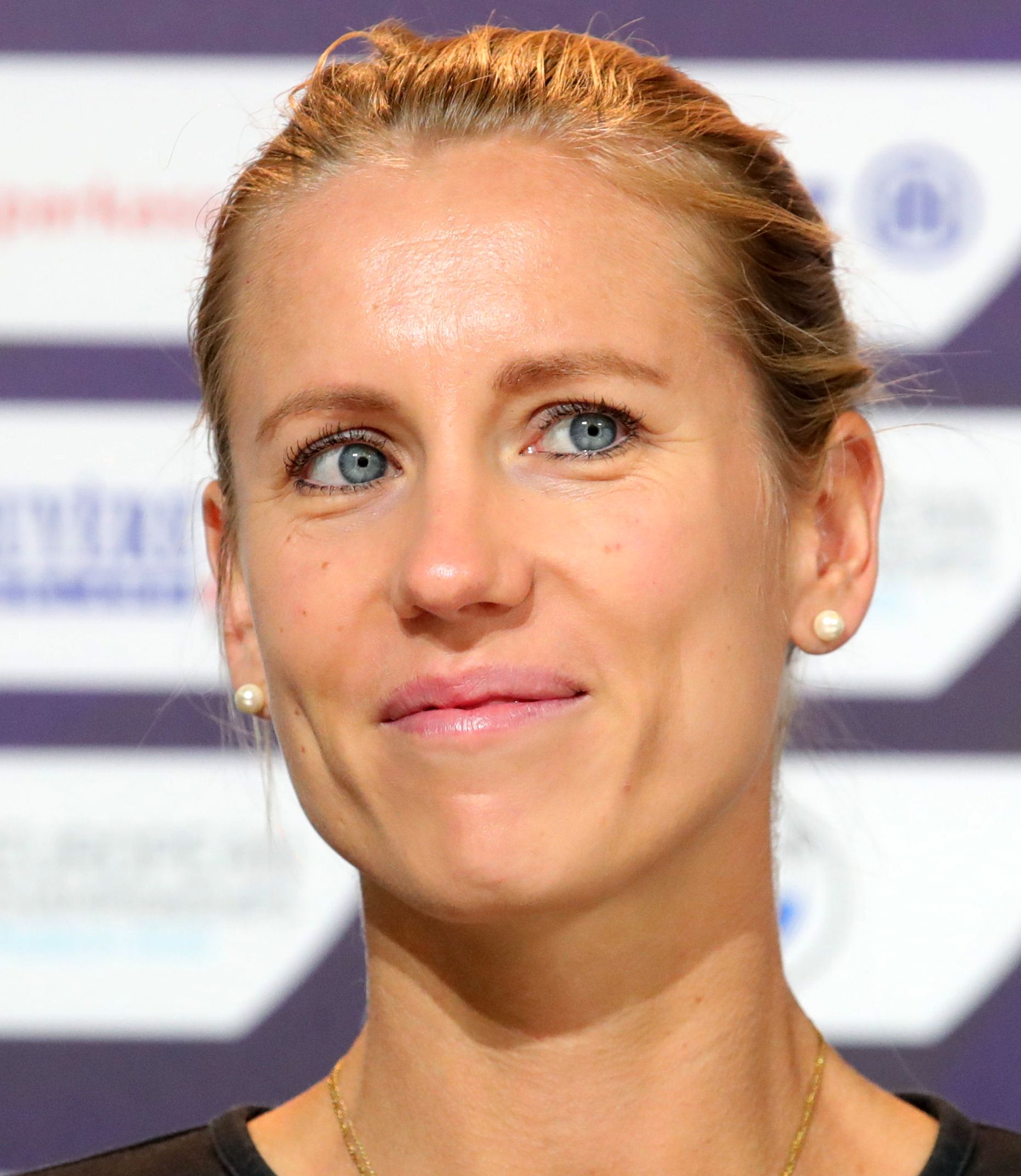
- Borger in 2022

Personal information
- Full name: Karla Borger
- Born: 22 November 1988 (age 37); Heppenheim, West Germany
- Height: 1.80 m (5 ft 11 in)
- Weight: 68 kg (150 lb)

Beach volleyball information

Current teammate
Years	Teammate
2025–present	Hanna-Marie Schieder

Previous teammates
Years	Teammate
2008; 2009; 2010–2016; 2017–2018; 2019–2022; 2023–2024	Britta Büthe; Rieke Brink-Abeler; Britta Büthe; Margareta Kozuch; Julia Sude; Sandra Ittlinger
Honours
Women's beach volleyball
Representing Germany
Beach Volleyball World Championships
Silver medal – second place	2013 Stare Jabłonki	Beach
European Championships
Bronze medal – third place	2016 Biel/Bienne	Beach
Bronze medal – third place	2021 Vienna	Beach

Karla Borger (born 22 November 1988 in Heppenheim) is a German beach volleyball player. She won a silver medal at the 2013 World Championships alongside her teammate Britta Büthe. In 2014 they won the German Championship. At the 2016 Summer Olympics in Rio de Janeiro, she competed in women's beach volleyball with teammate Britta Büthe. They were defeated by the Brazilian team of Larissa França and Talita Antunes in the round of 16. After Büthe quit professional beach volleyball in 2016, Borger teamed up with Margareta Kozuch until 2018. When Kozuch decided to play with Laura Ludwig, she formed a new team with Julia Sude and won the German Championship in 2019. The team qualified for participation in the Beach volleyball at the 2020 Summer Olympics.

She is the daughter of Cordula Pütter, European Champion in Beach Volleyball in 1995.

Borger is using sportswear and training products manufactured by Adidas

Awards
Preceded by April Ross (USA)	Women's FIVB World Tour "Best Server"; 2014	Succeeded by April Ross (USA)
