= Beach volleyball at the 2020 Summer Olympics – Women's qualification =

The qualification for the 2020 Women's Olympic beach volleyball tournament allocated quota places to 24 teams. A maximum of two teams per country was allowed to qualify.

== Qualification summary ==
Means of qualification	Date	Venue	Vacancies	Qualified
Host nation	—	—	1	Japan
2019 World Championships	28 June – 7 July 2019	(Germany) Hamburg	1	Canada
2019 FIVB Olympic Qualification Tournament	18–22 September 2019	(China) Haiyang	2	Latvia
2019 FIVB Olympic Qualification Tournament	18–22 September 2019	(China) Haiyang	2	Spain
FIVB Beach Volleyball Olympic Ranking	13 June 2021	(Switzerland) Lausanne	15	United States
FIVB Beach Volleyball Olympic Ranking	13 June 2021	(Switzerland) Lausanne	15	Brazil
FIVB Beach Volleyball Olympic Ranking	13 June 2021	(Switzerland) Lausanne	15	Brazil
FIVB Beach Volleyball Olympic Ranking	13 June 2021	(Switzerland) Lausanne	15	Australia
FIVB Beach Volleyball Olympic Ranking	13 June 2021	(Switzerland) Lausanne	15	United States
FIVB Beach Volleyball Olympic Ranking	13 June 2021	(Switzerland) Lausanne	15	Switzerland
FIVB Beach Volleyball Olympic Ranking	13 June 2021	(Switzerland) Lausanne	15	ROC
FIVB Beach Volleyball Olympic Ranking	13 June 2021	(Switzerland) Lausanne	15	Canada
FIVB Beach Volleyball Olympic Ranking	13 June 2021	(Switzerland) Lausanne	15	Switzerland
FIVB Beach Volleyball Olympic Ranking	13 June 2021	(Switzerland) Lausanne	15	Netherlands
FIVB Beach Volleyball Olympic Ranking	13 June 2021	(Switzerland) Lausanne	15	China
FIVB Beach Volleyball Olympic Ranking	13 June 2021	(Switzerland) Lausanne	15	Czech Republic
FIVB Beach Volleyball Olympic Ranking	13 June 2021	(Switzerland) Lausanne	15	Germany
FIVB Beach Volleyball Olympic Ranking	13 June 2021	(Switzerland) Lausanne	15	Germany
FIVB Beach Volleyball Olympic Ranking	13 June 2021	(Switzerland) Lausanne	15	Italy
2018–2020 CEV Continental Cup Final	23–26 June 2021	(Netherlands) The Hague	1	Netherlands
2018–2020 AVC Continental Cup Final	25–27 June 2021	(Thailand) Nakhon Pathom	1	China
2018–2020 CAVB Continental Cup Final	25–27 June 2021	(Morocco) Agadir	1	Kenya
2018–2020 NORCECA Continental Cup Final	25–27 June 2021	(Mexico) Colima	1	Cuba
2018–2020 CSV Continental Cup Final	26–27 June 2021	(Paraguay) Asunción	1	Argentina
Total			24	

== Host country ==
FIVB reserved a vacancy for the Olympics host country to participate in the tournament.

- Japan

== World Championships ==
One team qualified from the 2019 World Championships.

- Canada

== Intercontinental Olympic Qualification Tournament ==
- The top two teams from the FIVB Beach Volleyball Olympic Qualification Tournament qualified.
- Spain
- Latvia

== Olympic Ranking ==
15 teams qualified from the Olympic Ranking.

Top 25 Rankings as of June 15, 2020
Rank	Pair	Points	Qualified	Comment
1				
2				
3				
4				
5				
6				
7				
8				
9				
10				
11				
12				
13				
14				
15				
16				
17				
18				
19				
20				
21				
22				
23				
24				
25				
