= Wessel Keemink =

Dutch volleyball player (born 1993)

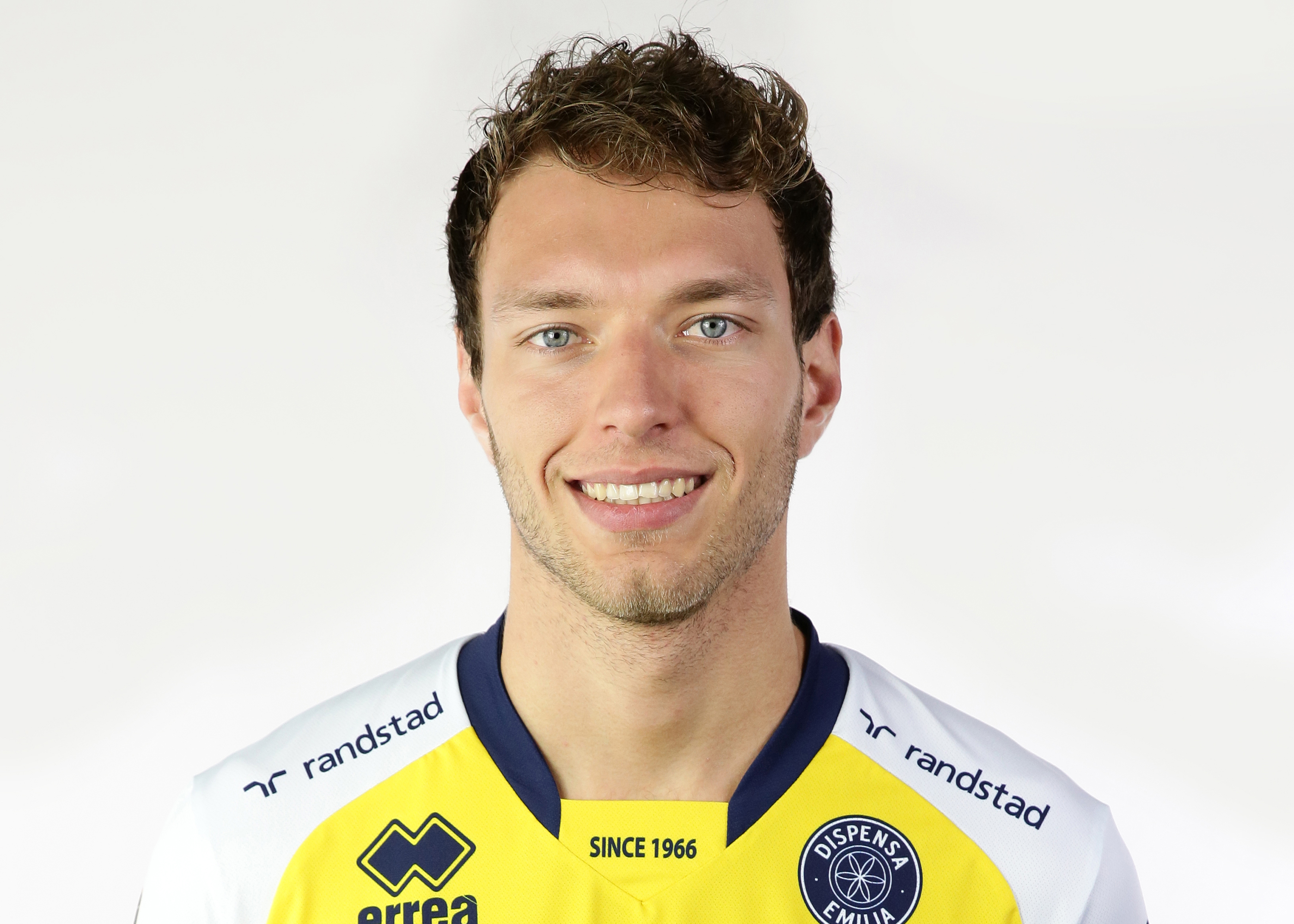

Personal information
- Born: 29 May 1993 (age 33) Schiedam, Netherlands
- Height: 1.97 m (6 ft 6 in)
- Weight: 81 kg (179 lb)
- Spike: 350 cm (138 in)
- Block: 338 cm (133 in)

Volleyball information
- Position: Setter
- Current club: VfB Friedrichshafen
- Number: 24

Career
- Years: Team
- 2014–2016 2016–2017 2017–2018 2018–2019 2019–2020 2021–2024 2024 2024–: Inter Rijswijk; Dynamo Apeldoorn; Lindemans Aalst; Modena Volley; OK Budva; VK Karlovarsko; PAOK Thessaloniki; VfB Friedrichshafen

National team
- Years: Team
- –: Netherlands
Honours
Men's volleyball
Representing Netherlands
European League
Bronze medal – third place	2019 Estonia

Wessel Keemink (born 29 May 1993) is a Dutch professional volleyball player who plays as a setter for VfB Friedrichshafen and the Netherlands national team.

== Honours ==
=== Club ===
- Domestic
  - 2018–19 Italian SuperCup, with Azimut Leo Shoes Modena
  - 2020–21 Czech Championship, with ČEZ Karlovarsko
  - 2021–22 Czech SuperCup, with ČEZ Karlovarsko
  - 2021–22 Czech Championship, with ČEZ Karlovarsko
  - 2022–23 Czech SuperCup, with ČEZ Karlovarsko
