= Kay Matysik =

German beach volleyball player (born 1980)

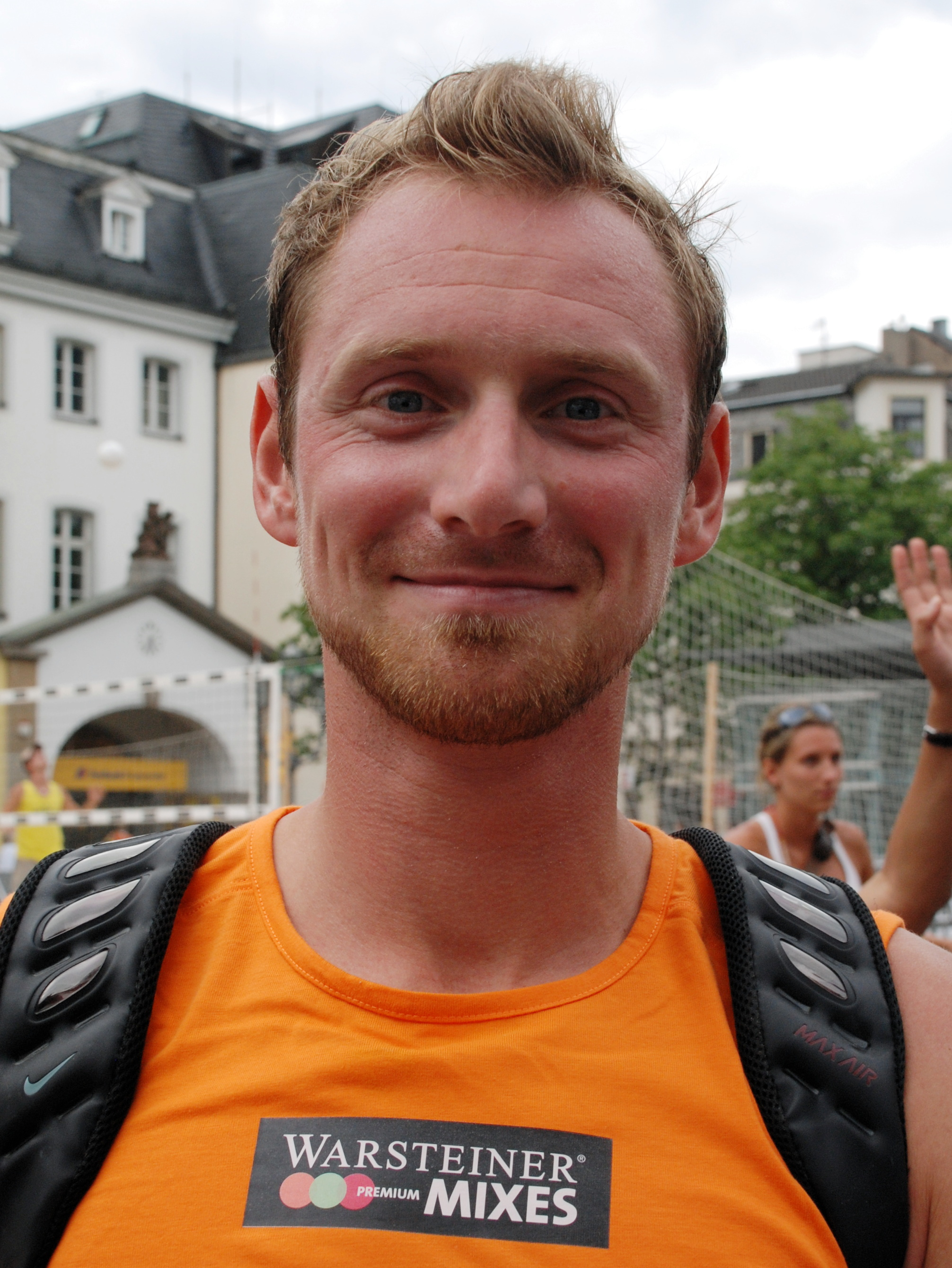
- Matysik in 2008

Personal information
- Born: 18 June 1980 (age 46); Berlin, Germany

Beach volleyball information
Teammate
Jonathan Erdmann
Honours
Men's beach volleyball
Representing Germany
World Championships
Bronze medal – third place	2013 Stare Jabłonki	Beach

Kay Matysik (born 18 June 1980, in Berlin) is a German male beach volleyball player. He competed for Germany at the 2012 Summer Olympics with team-mate Jonathan Erdmann. They were knocked out in the last 16. The same pair won the bronze medal at the 2013 Beach Volleyball World Championships, beating former world champions Alison Cerutti and Emanuel Rego in the bronze medal match.
