= Britta Büthe =

American-born German beach volleyball player (born 1988)

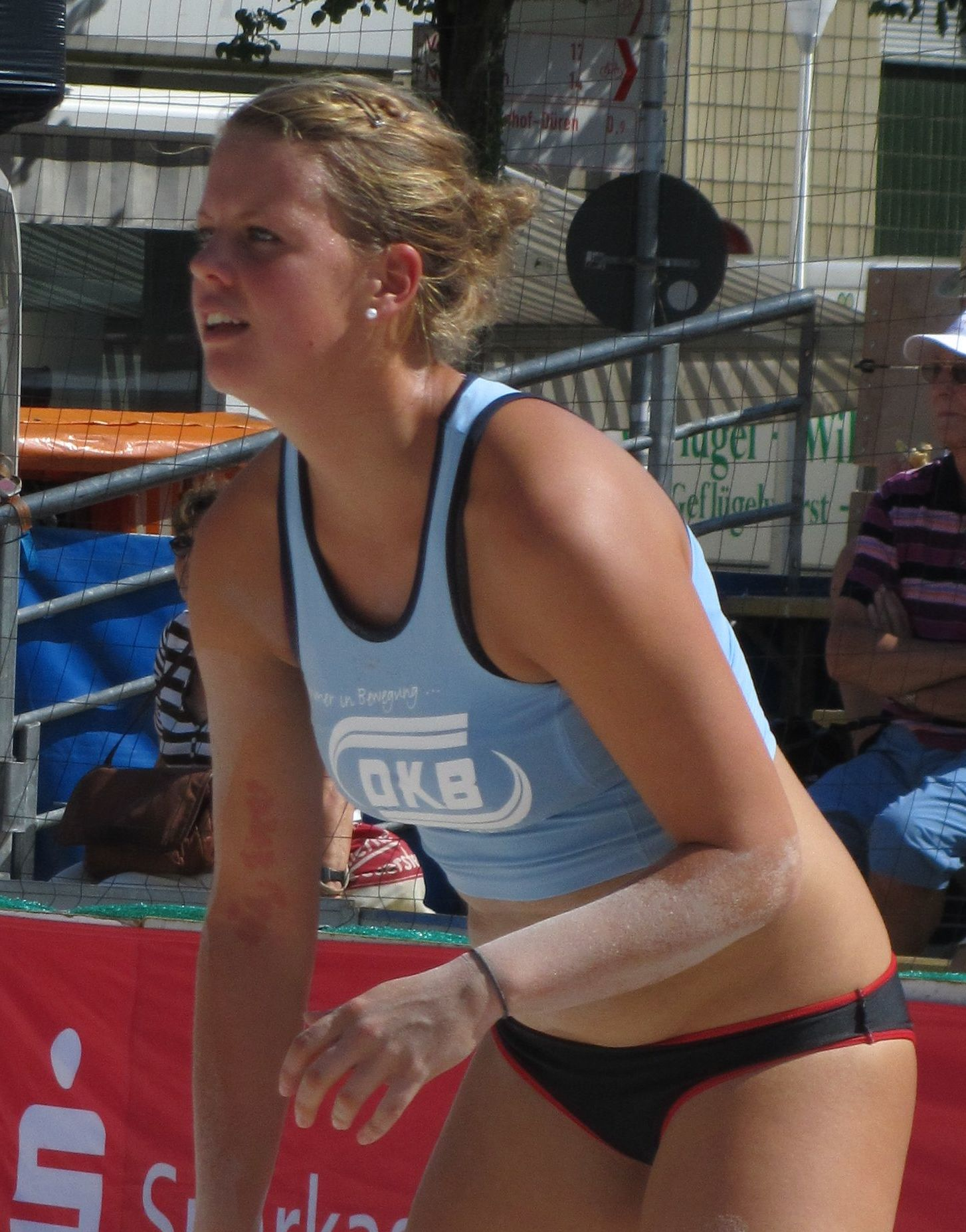
- Büthe in Düren, Germany, 2011

Personal information
- Full name: Britta Kristin Büthe
- Born: 25 May 1988 (age 38) Dearborn, Michigan, U.S.
Medal record
Women's beach volleyball
Representing Germany
World Championships
Silver medal – second place	2013 Stare Jabłonki	Beach

Britta Kristin Büthe (born 25 May 1988) is an American-born German beach volleyball player. She won a silver medal at the 2013 World Championships alongside her teammate Karla Borger. At the 2016 Summer Olympics in Rio de Janeiro, she competed in women's beach volleyball with teammate Kara Borger. They were defeated by the Brazilian team of Larissa França and Talita Antunes in the round of 16.

Awards
Preceded by Kristýna Kolocová (CZE); Markéta Sluková (CZE)	Women's FIVB World Tour "Top Rookie"; 2011	Succeeded by Bárbara Seixas (BRA)
