= Jonathan Erdmann =

German beach volleyball player

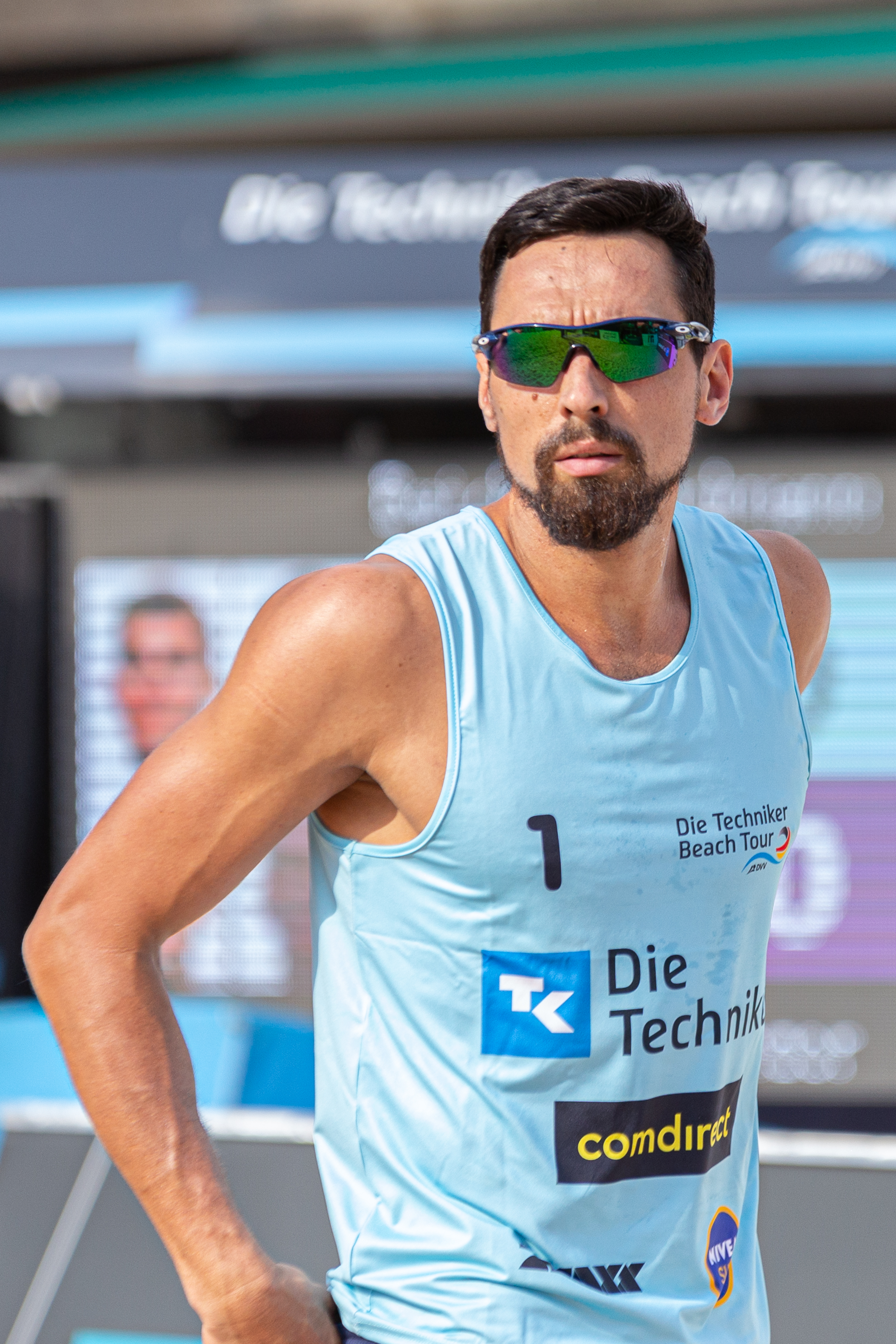
- Erdmann at the 2019 World Championships

Personal information
- Born: 12 March 1988 (age 38); Potsdam, East Germany
- Height: 6 ft 4 in (1.93 m)
Honours
Men's beach volleyball
Representing Germany
World Championships
Bronze medal – third place	2013 Stare Jabłonki	Beach

Jonathan Erdmann (born 12 March 1988 in Potsdam) is a German beach volleyball player. He competed for Germany at the 2012 Summer Olympics.
