= Sergio Ferrari (politician) =

Italian politician (born 1973)

Member of the Regional Council of Calabria
- Incumbent
- Assumed office 5 October 2025

President of the Province of Crotone
- In office 19 December 2021 – 29 December 2025
- Preceded by: Ugo Pugliese
- Succeeded by: Antonio Ammirati

Mayor of Cirò Marina
- In office 7 October 2020 – 3 February 2026
- Preceded by: Nicodemo Parrilla
- Succeeded by: Mariagrazia Panebianco

Personal details
- Born: 23 November 1973 (age 52) Cirò Marina, Calabria, Italy
- Party: Forza Italia
- Education: University of Messina
- Occupation: Chartered accountant

Sergio Ferrari (born 23 November 1973) is an Italian politician of Forza Italia who has served as a member of the Regional Council of Calabria since 2025. He previously served as president of the Province of Crotone from 2021 to 2025 and as mayor of Cirò Marina from 2020 to 2025.

== Life and career ==
Ferrari was born in Cirò Marina in 1973. He graduated in economics from the University of Messina and has worked as a chartered accountant.

He entered politics in 2011, when he was elected to the municipal council of Cirò Marina and appointed assessor with responsibility for budget, economic planning, productive activities, culture, technological innovation, tourism and taxation. Re-elected in 2016, he served as leader of the municipal council group until 2018. In October 2020, Ferrari was elected mayor of Cirò Marina in a runoff election, receiving 56.52% of the vote against Giuseppe Dell'Aquila.

In December 2021, Ferrari was elected president of the Province of Crotone as the centre-right candidate, supported by a broader network of local mayors and councillors. He received 63.71% of the weighted vote against Vincenzo Voce, the mayor of Crotone, who was supported by two lists including one backed by the Democratic Party.

Ferrari was elected to the Regional Council of Calabria in the 2025 Calabrian regional election on the Forza Italia list in the central constituency, receiving 12,105 preference votes. He became president of the council's Fourth Commission, responsible for environment, public works, infrastructure, urban planning, protected areas, roads and civil protection.
