= Beach volleyball at the 2024 Summer Olympics – Men's qualification =

The men's qualification for the Olympic beach volleyball tournament will occur between January 2023 and June 2024. The competition will comprise a total of 24 men's beach volleyball pairs coming from different NOCs, similar to those in the previous editions; each NOC can enter a maximum of two pairs in the men's tournament. As the host nation, France reserves the direct spot for the men's beach volleyball pair.

The remainder of the twenty-four team field must endure a tripartite qualification pathway to obtain a ticket for Paris 2024, abiding by the universality principle and respecting the two-pair NOC limit. The initial spot was directly awarded to the men's winners, respectively, from the 2023 FIVB Beach Volleyball World Championships, scheduled from 6 to 15 October in Mexico, with the seventeen highest-ranked eligible men's pairs joining them in the field through the FIVB Olympic ranking list (based on the twelve best performances achieved as a pair) between 1 January 2023 and 9 June 2024. The events valid for ranking results include but are not limited to the following:

- 2023 FIVB Beach Volleyball World Championships
- 2023–2024 Beach Pro Tour (Elite, Challenge, Future, and Finals)
- 2023–2024 FIVB Continental Tours Finals

The final five spots will be attributed to the highest-ranked eligible NOCs from each of the five continental qualification tournaments, namely the AVC Continental Cup Final for Asia and Oceania; the CAVB Continental Cup Final for Africa; the CEV Continental Cup Final for Europe; the CSV Continental Cup Final for South America; and the NORCECA Continental Cup Final for North America, Central America, and the Caribbean. The final phase of these five events will occur between 13 and 23 June 2024.

== Qualification summary ==
Qualification	Date	Host	Berths	Qualified NOC
Host nation	—		1	France
2023 FIVB Beach Volleyball World Championships	6–15 October 2023	(Mexico) Tlaxcala	1	Czech Republic
FIVB Beach Volleyball Olympic Ranking	9 June 2024	(Switzerland) Lausanne	17	Sweden
FIVB Beach Volleyball Olympic Ranking	9 June 2024	(Switzerland) Lausanne	17	Norway
FIVB Beach Volleyball Olympic Ranking	9 June 2024	(Switzerland) Lausanne	17	Germany
FIVB Beach Volleyball Olympic Ranking	9 June 2024	(Switzerland) Lausanne	17	Brazil
FIVB Beach Volleyball Olympic Ranking	9 June 2024	(Switzerland) Lausanne	17	United States
FIVB Beach Volleyball Olympic Ranking	9 June 2024	(Switzerland) Lausanne	17	Netherlands
FIVB Beach Volleyball Olympic Ranking	9 June 2024	(Switzerland) Lausanne	17	Brazil
FIVB Beach Volleyball Olympic Ranking	9 June 2024	(Switzerland) Lausanne	17	Italy
FIVB Beach Volleyball Olympic Ranking	9 June 2024	(Switzerland) Lausanne	17	Poland
FIVB Beach Volleyball Olympic Ranking	9 June 2024	(Switzerland) Lausanne	17	Netherlands
FIVB Beach Volleyball Olympic Ranking	9 June 2024	(Switzerland) Lausanne	17	Qatar
FIVB Beach Volleyball Olympic Ranking	9 June 2024	(Switzerland) Lausanne	17	United States
FIVB Beach Volleyball Olympic Ranking	9 June 2024	(Switzerland) Lausanne	17	Spain
FIVB Beach Volleyball Olympic Ranking	9 June 2024	(Switzerland) Lausanne	17	Italy
FIVB Beach Volleyball Olympic Ranking	9 June 2024	(Switzerland) Lausanne	17	Australia
FIVB Beach Volleyball Olympic Ranking	9 June 2024	(Switzerland) Lausanne	17	Cuba
FIVB Beach Volleyball Olympic Ranking	9 June 2024	(Switzerland) Lausanne	17	Austria
2023–2024 CEV Continental Cup Final	13–16 June 2024	(Latvia) Jūrmala	1	France
2023–2024 CAVB Continental Cup Final	20–23 June 2024	Martil	1	Morocco
2023–2024 AVC Continental Cup Final	21–23 June 2024	(China) Ningbo	1	Australia
2023–2024 CSV Continental Cup Final	21–23 June 2024	(Chile) Iquique	1	Chile
2023–2024 NORCECA Continental Cup Final	21–23 June 2024	Tlaxcala	1	Canada
Total			24	

== Host country ==
FIVB reserved a berth for the 2024 Summer Olympics host country to participate in the beach volleyball tournament.

- France

== 2023 FIVB Beach Volleyball World Championships ==
The winning men's pair of the 2023 FIVB Beach Volleyball World Championships, scheduled from 6 to 15 October in Mexico, secured a spot for Paris 2024.

=== Bracket ===
Round of 32
11 October
(Norway) A. Mol – Sørum	2
(Chile) M. Grimalt – E. Grimalt	0
11 October
(Argentina) N. Capogrosso – T. Capogrosso	0
(Italy) Cottafava – Nicolai	2
11 October
(Cuba) Alayo – Díaz	0
(Italy) Lupo – Rossi	2
11 October
(Czech Republic) Perušič – Schweiner	2
(Spain) Herrera – Gavira	0
11 October
(Austria) Seidl – Pristauz	1
(Brazil) Solberg – Carvalhaes	2
11 October
(Brazil) Evandro – Arthur	2
(Brazil) Vitor Felipe – Renato	0
11 October
(Canada) Schachter – Dearing	0
(Australia) Hodges – Schubert	2
11 October
(Australia) McHugh – Burnett	0
(United States) Crabb – Brunner	2
11 October
(United States) Partain – Benesh	2
(Poland) Kantor – Zdybek	0
11 October
(China) Halikejiang – Wu	0
(Italy) Ranghieri – Carambula	2
11 October
(Poland) Łosiak – Bryl	2
(Norway) H. Mol – Berntsen	0
11 October
(Austria) Hörl – Horst	0
(Germany) Ehlers – Wickler	2
11 October
(Qatar) Cherif – Ahmed	0
(Netherlands) Boermans – De Groot	2
11 October
(Ukraine) Popov – Reznik	0
(Netherlands) Immers – Van de Velde	2
11 October
(Netherlands) Brouwer – Meeuwsen	2
(Chile) Aravena – Droguett	1
11 October
(United States) Evans – Budinger	0
(Sweden) Åhman – Hellvig	2

Round of 16
12 October
(Norway) A. Mol – Sørum	2
(Italy) Cottafava – Nicolai	0
12 October
(Italy) Lupo – Rossi	0
(Czech Republic) Perušič – Schweiner	2
12 October
(Brazil) Solberg – Carvalhaes	2
(Brazil) Evandro – Arthur	1
12 October
(Australia) Hodges – Schubert	0
(United States) Crabb – Brunner	2
12 October
(United States) Partain – Benesh	2
(Italy) Ranghieri – Carambula	0
12 October
(Poland) Łosiak – Bryl	2
(Germany) Ehlers – Wickler	0
12 October
(Netherlands) Boermans – De Groot	2
(Netherlands) Immers – Van de Velde	1
12 October
(Netherlands) Brouwer – Meeuwsen	0
(Sweden) Åhman – Hellvig	2

Quarter-finals
13 October
(Norway) A. Mol – Sørum	1
(Czech Republic) Perušič – Schweiner	2
13 October
(Brazil) Solberg – Carvalhaes	0
(United States) Crabb – Brunner	2
13 October
(United States) Partain – Benesh	0
(Poland) Łosiak – Bryl	2
13 October
(Netherlands) Boermans – De Groot	1
(Sweden) Åhman – Hellvig	2

Semi-finals
14 October
(Czech Republic) Perušič – Schweiner	2
(United States) Crabb – Brunner	0
14 October
(Poland) Łosiak – Bryl	1
(Sweden) Åhman – Hellvig	2

Final
15 October
(Czech Republic) Perušič – Schweiner	2
(Sweden) Åhman – Hellvig	1
Third place
15 October
(United States) Crabb – Brunner	0
(Poland) Łosiak – Bryl	2

=== Rankings ===
Rank	Country	Players
1st place, gold medalist(s)	Czech Republic	Ondřej Perušič – David Schweiner
2nd place, silver medalist(s)	Sweden	David Åhman – Jonatan Hellvig
3rd place, bronze medalist(s)	Poland	Bartosz Łosiak – Michał Bryl
4	United States	Trevor Crabb – Theodore Brunner
5	Brazil	Pedro Solberg – Gustavo Carvalhaes
5	Netherlands	Stefan Boermans – Yorick de Groot
5	Norway	Anders Mol – Christian Sørum
5	United States	Miles Partain – Andrew Benesh
9	Australia	Thomas Hodges – Zachery Schubert
9	Brazil	Evandro Oliveira – Arthur Lanci
9	Germany	Nils Ehlers – Clemens Wickler
9	Italy	Samuele Cottafava – Paolo Nicolai
9	Italy	Daniele Lupo – Enrico Rossi
9	Italy	Alex Ranghieri – Adrian Carambula
9	Netherlands	Alexander Brouwer – Robert Meeuwsen
9	Netherlands	Matthew Immers – Steven van de Velde
17	Argentina	Nicolás Capogrosso – Tomas Capogrosso
17	Australia	Chris McHugh – Paul Burnett
17	Austria	Julian Hörl – Alexander Horst
17	Austria	Robin Seidl – Moritz Pristauz
17	Brazil	Vitor Gonçalves Felipe – Renato de Carvalho
17	Canada	Sam Schachter – Daniel Dearing
17	Chile	Noé Aravena – Vicente Droguett
17	Chile	Marco Grimalt – Esteban Grimalt
17	China	Ha Likejiang – Wu Jiaxin
17	Cuba	Jorge Alayo – Noslen Díaz
17	Norway	Hendrik Mol – Mathias Berntsen
17	Poland	Piotr Kantor – Jakub Zdybek
17	Qatar	Cherif Younousse – Ahmed Tijan
17	Spain	Pablo Herrera – Adrián Gavira
17	Ukraine	Sergiy Popov – Eduard Reznik
17	United States	Miles Evans – Chase Budinger

Qualified for the 2024 Summer Olympics

== 2023–2024 FIVB Olympic Rankings ==
The seventeen highest-ranked eligible men's pairs will secure a direct spot for Paris 2024 based on the FIVB Olympic ranking points accrued in the twelve best performances as a pair from 1 January 2023 to 9 June 2024. The events valid for ranking results include but are not limited to the following:

- 2023 FIVB Beach Volleyball World Championships
- 2023–2024 Beach Pro Tour (Elite, Challenge, Future, and Finals)
- 2023–2024 FIVB Continental Tours Finals

Qualified directly for the 2024 Summer Olympics
Qualified as world champions for the 2024 Summer Olympics
Ineligible because of the two-pair NOC limit

No.	Rank	Players	NOC	FIVB Points	NOC Rank
1	1	David Åhman – Jonatan Hellvig	Sweden	13,160	1
2	2	Anders Mol – Christian Sørum	Norway	11,360	1
3	3	Nils Ehlers – Clemens Wickler	Germany	10,500	1
4	4	George Wanderley – André Stein	Brazil	10,420	1
5 (WC)	5	Ondřej Perušič – David Schweiner	Czech Republic	10,380	1
6	6	Miles Partain – Andrew Benesh	United States	9,980	1
7	7	Stefan Boermans – Yorick de Groot	Netherlands	9,820	1
8	8	Evandro Oliveira – Arthur Lanci	Brazil	9,580	2
9	9	Samuele Cottafava – Paolo Nicolai	Italy	9,240	1
10	10	Michał Bryl – Bartosz Łosiak	Poland	9,200	1
11	11	Matthew Immers – Steven van de Velde	Netherlands	9,180	2
12		Alexander Brouwer – Robert Meeuwsen	Netherlands	8,600	
13	12	Cherif Younousse – Ahmed Tijan	Qatar	8,560	1
14	13	Miles Evans – Chase Budinger	United States	8,400	2
15	14	Pablo Herrera – Adrián Gavira	Spain	8,080	1
16		Trevor Crabb – Theo Brunner	United States	7,860	
17	15	Alex Ranghieri – Adrian Carambula	Italy	7,840	2
18	16	Thomas Hodges – Zachery Schubert	Australia	7,820	1
19	17	Jorge Alayo – Noslen Díaz	Cuba	7,800	1
20	18	Julian Hörl – Alexander Horst	Austria	7,260	1
21		Marco Grimalt – Esteban Grimalt	Chile	7,260	
22		Pedro Solberg – Guto Carvalhaes	Brazil	7,260	
23		Renato de Carvalho – Vitor Felipe	Brazil	6,960	
24		Chaim Schalk – Tri Bourne	United States	6,580	
25		Robin Seidl – Moritz Pristauz	Austria	6,540	

== Continental Cup Final ==
The final five spots will be attributed to the highest-ranked eligible NOCs from each of the five continental qualification tournaments (Africa; Asia and Oceania; Europe; North America, Central America, and the Caribbean; and South America). The final phase of these five events will occur between 13 and 23 June 2024.

=== Africa ===
The winning NOC of the 2024 CAVB Beach Volleyball Continental Cup, scheduled from 20 to 23 June in Martil, Morocco, secured a spot for Paris 2024.

==== Bracket ====
Quarterfinals
22 June 2024
South Africa	2
Botswana	0
22 June 2024
Morocco	2
The Gambia	1
22 June 2024
Senegal	0
Togo	2
22 June 2024
Ghana	0
Mozambique	2

Semifinals
23 June 2024
South Africa	1
Morocco	2
23 June 2024
Togo	1
Mozambique	2

Final
23 June 2024
Morocco	2
Mozambique	0

==== Rankings ====
Rank	Country
1	Morocco
2	Mozambique
3	South Africa
3	Togo
5	Botswana
5	Ghana
5	Senegal
5	The Gambia

Qualified for the 2024 Summer Olympics

=== Asia and Oceania ===
The winning NOC of the 2024 AVC Beach Volleyball Continental Cup Final, scheduled from 21 to 23 June in Ningbo, China, secured a spot for Paris 2024.

==== Bracket ====
Quarterfinals
21 June
China	2
Oman	0
21 June
Japan	0
Iran	2
21 June
Australia	2
Qatar	0
21 June
New Zealand	1
Indonesia	2

Semifinals
22 June
China	2
Iran	0
22 June
Australia	2
Indonesia	0

Final
23 June
China	1
Australia	2

==== Rankings ====
Rank	Country
1	Australia
2	China
3	Indonesia
3	Iran
5	Japan
5	New Zealand
5	Oman
5	Qatar

Qualified for the 2024 Summer Olympics

=== Europe ===
The winning NOC of the 2024 CEV Beach Volley Nations Cup Final, scheduled from 13 to 16 June in Jūrmala, Latvia, secured a spot for Paris 2024.

==== Bracket ====
Quarterfinals
15 June
Norway	1 (11)
Portugal (ags)	1 (15)
15 June
France	2
Belgium	0
15 June
Austria	2
Poland	0
15 June
Latvia (ags)	1 (15)
Germany	1 (9)

Semifinals
16 June
Portugal	0
France	2
16 June
Austria	2
Latvia	0

Final
16 June
France (ags)	1 (15)
Austria	1 (10)

==== Rankings ====
Rank	Country
1	France
2	Austria
3	Latvia
3	Portugal
5	Belgium
5	Germany
5	Norway
5	Poland

Qualified for the 2024 Summer Olympics

=== North America, Central America, and the Caribbean ===
The winning NOC of the 2024 NORCECA Beach Volleyball Tour Finals, scheduled from 21 to 23 June in Tlaxcala, Mexico, secured a spot for Paris 2024.

==== Bracket ====
Quarterfinals
22 June
Canada	2
Costa Rica	0
22 June
Nicaragua	2
Virgin Islands	0
22 June
Mexico	2
Dominican Republic	1
22 June
El Salvador	2
Guatemala	0

Semifinals
23 June
Canada	2
Nicaragua	0
23 June
Mexico	2
El Salvador	0

Final
23 June
Canada	2
Mexico	0

==== Rankings ====
Rank	Country
1	Canada
2	Mexico
3	El Salvador
4	Nicaragua
5	Dominican Republic
6	Virgin Islands
7	Guatemala
8	Costa Rica

Qualified for the 2024 Summer Olympics

=== South America ===
The winning NOC of the 2024 CSV Clasificatório Olímpico, scheduled from 21 to 23 June in Iquique, Chile, secured a spot for Paris 2024.

==== Bracket ====
Semifinals
22 June
Chile	3
Paraguay	0
22 June
Ecuador	0
Argentina	3

Final
23 June
Chile (ags)	2 (15)
Argentina	2 (11)

==== Rankings ====
Rank	Country
1	Chile
2	Argentina
3	Ecuador
3	Paraguay
5	Bolivia
5	Uruguay

Qualified for the 2024 Summer Olympics
