= 2022 Volleyball World Beach Pro Tour =

International beach volleyball competition

Tournament details
- Host country: Various
- Dates: 16 March 2022 – 29 January 2023

The 2022 Volleyball World Beach Pro Tour was the first edition of the global elite professional beach volleyball circuit organized by the Fédération Internationale de Volleyball (FIVB) for the 2022 beach volleyball season. Since March 2022, the Tour comprised three tiers: Future, Challenge and Elite 16. The season ended with The Finals featuring the 10 best teams in the world.

The Volleyball World Beach Pro Tour was established by FIVB in October 2021, thus it replaced the former FIVB Beach Volleyball World Tour.

== Schedule ==
Key

World Championships
Beach Pro Tour Finals
Elite 16
Challenge
Future

=== Men ===
Tournament	Champions	Runners-up	Third place	Fourth place
Tlaxcala Challenge; Tlaxcala, Mexico; US$75,000; 16–20 March 2022	Michał Bryl (POL); Bartosz Łosiak (POL); 21–17, 21–16	Noé Aravena (CHL); Vicente Droguett (CHL)	Aleksandrs Samoilovs (LAT); Jānis Šmēdiņš (LAT); 22–20, 21–12	Vitor Felipe (BRA); Renato Carvalho (BRA)
Rosarito Elite 16; Rosarito, Mexico; US$150,000; 23–27 March 2022	Cherif Younousse (QAT); Ahmed Tijan (QAT); 21–17, 21–15	Alexander Brouwer (NED); Robert Meeuwsen (NED)	Anders Mol (NOR); Christian Sørum (NOR); 12–21, 21–17, 15–12	Michał Bryl (POL); Bartosz Łosiak (POL)
Coolangatta Future; Coolangatta, Australia; US$5,000; 30 March–3 April 2022	Izac Carracher (AUS); Mark Nicolaidis (AUS); 21–11, 21–16	Jake MacNeil (CAN); Alexander Russell (CAN)	Thomas Hodges (AUS); Max Guehrer (AUS); 21–13, 21–18	Jakub Zdybek (POL); Paweł Lewandowski (POL)
Songkhla Future; Songkhla, Thailand; US$5,000; 14–17 April 2022	Carlo Bonifazi (ITA); Davide Benzi (ITA); 27–25, 21–19	Miles Evans (USA); Andy Benesh (USA)	Thomas Reid (NZL); Ben O'Dea (NZL) w/o	Julian Hörl (AUT); Alexander Horst (AUT)
Itapema Challenge; Itapema, Brazil; US$75,000; 14–17 April 2022	George Wanderley (BRA); André Stein (BRA); 19–21, 21–14, 15–12	Ondřej Perušič (CZE); David Schweiner (CZE)	Leon Luini (NED); Ruben Penninga (NED) w/o	Kusti Nõlvak (EST); Mart Tiisaar (EST)
Doha Challenge; Doha, Qatar; US$75,000; 5–8 May 2022	Michał Bryl (POL); Bartosz Łosiak (POL); 21–18, 21–15	Paolo Nicolai (ITA); Samuele Cottafava (ITA)	Martin Ermacora (AUT); Moritz Pristauz (AUT); 21–17, 21–18	Yorick de Groot (NED); Stefan Boermans (NED)
Madrid Future; Madrid, Spain; US$5,000; 12–15 May 2022	Quentin Métral (SUI); Yves Haussener (SUI); 11–21, 27–25, 15–13	Pablo Herrera (ESP); Adrián Gavira (ESP)	Matthew Immers (NED); Mart van Werkhoven (NED); 21–15, 17–21, 15–11	Nejc Zemljak (SLO); Jan Pokeršnik (SLO)
Kuşadası Challenge; Kuşadası, Turkey; US$75,000; 19–22 May 2022	David Åhman (SWE); Jonatan Hellvig (SWE); 19–21, 21–18, 15–12	Chris McHugh (AUS); Paul Burnett (AUS)	Clemens Wickler (GER); Nils Ehlers (GER); 21–12, 17–21, 15–12	Adrian Carambula (ITA); Enrico Rossi (ITA)
Rhodes Future; Rhodes, Greece; US$5,000; 19–22 May 2022	Quentin Métral (SUI); Yves Haussener (SUI); 21–18, 18–21, 15–10	Logan Webber (USA); Miles Evans (USA)	Jyrki Nurminen (FIN); Santeri Sirén (FIN); 21–11, 21–15	Jakub Szałankiewicz (POL); Mateusz Florczyk (POL)
Ostrava Elite 16; Ostrava, Czech Republic; US$150,000; 25–29 May 2022	Anders Mol (NOR); Christian Sørum (NOR); 15–21, 23–21, 15–13	Ondřej Perušič (CZE); David Schweiner (CZE)	Alexander Brouwer (NED); Robert Meeuwsen (NED); 25–23, 21–19	Pablo Herrera (ESP); Adrián Gavira (ESP)
Cervia Future; Cervia, Italy; US$5,000; 26–29 May 2022	Fabrizio Manni (ITA); Francesco Vanni (ITA); 21–19, 21–12	Zachery Schubert (AUS); Thomas Hodges (AUS)	Eylon Elazar (ISR); Netanel Ohana (ISR); 18–21, 21–15, 15–4	Immanuel Zürcher (SUI); Jonathan Jordan (SUI)
Jūrmala Elite 16; Jūrmala, Latvia; US$150,000; 1–5 June 2022	Paolo Nicolai (ITA); Samuele Cottafava (ITA); 16–21, 27–25, 15–12	Cherif Younousse (QAT); Ahmed Tijan (QAT)	André Stein (BRA); George Wanderley (BRA); 21–17, 18–21, 15–13	Kusti Nõlvak (EST); Mart Tiisaar (EST)
Klaipėda Future; Klaipėda, Lithuania; US$5,000; 2–5 June 2022	Julian Hörl (AUT); Alexander Horst (AUT); 24–22, 21–12	Eylon Elazar (ISR); Netanel Ohana (ISR)	Jyrki Nurminen (FIN); Santeri Sirén (FIN); 21–19, 21–19	Jakub Šépka (CZE); Tomáš Semerád (CZE)
FIVB World Championships; Rome, Italy; US$500,000; 10–19 June 2022	Anders Mol (NOR); Christian Sørum (NOR); 21–15, 21–16	Renato Carvalho (BRA); Vitor Felipe (BRA)	André Stein (BRA); George Wanderley (BRA); 15–21, 21–17, 15–11	Chaim Schalk (USA); Theodore Brunner (USA)
Balıkesir Future; Balıkesir, Turkey; US$5,000; 16–19 June 2022	Đorđe Klašnić (SRB); Lazar Kolarić (SRB); 21–17, 21–18	Brad Fuller (NZL); Sam O'Dea (NZL)	Thomas Hartles (NZL); Alani Nicklin (NZL) w/o	Thomas Reid (NZL); Ben O'Dea (NZL)
Białystok Future; Białystok, Poland; US$5,000; 23–26 June 2022	Jakub Szałankiewicz (POL); Mateusz Florczyk (POL); 21–13, 21–18	Sergiy Popov (UKR); Eduard Reznik (UKR)	Robert Juchnevič (LTU); Artūr Vasiljev (LTU); 21–19, 21–13	Patrikas Stankevičius (LTU); Audrius Knašas (LTU)
Ios Future; Ios, Greece; US$5,000; 29 June–2 July 2022	Václav Berčík (CZE); Matyas Džavoronok (CZE); 21–15, 21–11	Eylon Elazar (ISR); Netanel Ohana (ISR)	Issa Batrane (ENG); Frederick Bialokoz (ENG); 21–15, 21–14	Nils Ringøen (NOR); Svein Solhaug (NOR)
Giardini Naxos Future; Giardini Naxos, Italy; US$5,000; 30 June–3 July 2022	Brad Fuller (NZL); Sam O'Dea (NZL); 19–21, 21–16, 17–15	Davide Benzi (ITA); Carlo Bonifazi (ITA)	Jakob Windisch (ITA); Gianluca Dal Corso (ITA); 18–21, 22–20, 15–9	Patrikas Stankevičius (LTU); Audrius Knašas (LTU)
Gstaad Elite 16; Gstaad, Switzerland; US$150,000; 6–10 July 2022	Marco Grimalt (CHL); Esteban Grimalt (CHL); 21–19, 22–20	Ondřej Perušič (CZE); David Schweiner (CZE)	Christiaan Varenhorst (NED); Steven van de Velde (NED); 20–22, 21–16, 15–12	Bruno Oscar Schmidt (BRA); Saymon Santos (BRA)
Lecce Future; Lecce, Italy; US$5,000; 7–10 July 2022	Jakob Windisch (ITA); Gianluca Dal Corso (ITA); 13–21, 21–18, 15–12	Sergiy Popov (UKR); Eduard Reznik (UKR)	Jacob Brinck (DEN); Kristoffer Abell (DEN); 21–17, 21–19	Bautista Amieva (ARG); Leo Aveiro (ARG)
Espinho Challenge; Espinho, Portugal; US$75,000; 14–17 July 2022	Michał Bryl (POL); Bartosz Łosiak (POL); 17–21, 21–13, 15–11	Martin Ermacora (AUT); Moritz Pristauz (AUT)	Aleksandrs Samoilovs (LAT); Jānis Šmēdiņš (LAT); 21–17, 21–14	Piotr Kantor (POL); Maciej Rudol (POL)
Cirò Marina Future; Cirò Marina, Italy; US$5,000; 14–17 July 2022	Bautista Amieva (ARG); Leo Aveiro (ARG); 21–16, 21–0	Davide Benzi (ITA); Carlo Bonifazi (ITA)	Issa Batrane (ENG); Frederick Bialokoz (ENG); 22–20, 21–18	Markus Mol (NOR); Nils Ringøen (NOR)
Agadir Challenge; Agadir, Morocco; US$75,000; 21–24 July 2022	Matthew Immers (NED); Stefan Boermans (NED); 21–13, 21–8	Mathias Berntsen (NOR); Hendrik Mol (NOR)	Marco Krattiger (SUI); Florian Breer (SUI); 19–21, 21–14, 15–10	Chris McHugh (AUS); Paul Burnett (AUS)
Leuven Future; Leuven, Belgium; US$5,000; 21–24 July 2022	Bautista Amieva (ARG); Leo Aveiro (ARG); 17–21, 21–10, 15–13	Philipp Huster (GER); Benedikt Sagstetter (GER)	Vladyslav Iemelianchyk (UKR); Denys Denysenko (UKR); 16–21, 24–22, 15–13	Liam Patte (FRA); Timothée Platre (FRA)
Warsaw Future; Warsaw, Poland; US$5,000; 21–24 July 2022	Michał Kądzioła (POL); Marcin Ociepski (POL); 21–16, 21–18	Piotr Janiak (POL); Jędrzej Brożyniak (POL)	Miłosz Kruk (POL); Mikołaj Miszczuk (POL); 21–12, 19–21, 15–10	Robert Juchnevič (LTU); Artūr Vasiljev (LTU)
Ljubljana Future; Ljubljana, Slovenia; US$5,000; 28–31 July 2022	Bautista Amieva (ARG); Leo Aveiro (ARG); 21–17, 18–21, 18–16	Louis Vandecaveye (BEL); Gilles Vandecaveye (BEL)	Zachery Schubert (AUS); Thomas Hodges (AUS); 21–16, 21–16	Đorđe Klašnić (SRB); Lazar Kolarić (SRB)
Mysłowice Future; Mysłowice, Poland; US$5,000; 28–31 July 2022	Patrikas Stankevičius (LTU); Audrius Knašas (LTU); 21–16, 21–9	Jakub Szałankiewicz (POL); Mateusz Florczyk (POL)	Jakub Zdybek (POL); Paweł Lewandowski (POL); 21–9, 21–19	Mathias Seiser (AUT); Moritz Kindl (AUT)
Hamburg Elite 16; Hamburg, Germany; US$150,000; 10–14 August 2022	Michał Bryl (POL); Bartosz Łosiak (POL); 21–18, 16–21, 29–27	Alexander Brouwer (NED); Robert Meeuwsen (NED)	Nils Ehlers (GER); Clemens Wickler (GER); 23–21, 21–18	Stefan Boermans (NED); Matthew Immers (NED)
Budapest Future; Budapest, Hungary; US$5,000; 11–14 August 2022	Patrikas Stankevičius (LTU); Audrius Knašas (LTU); 21–16, 21–15	Denys Denysenko (UKR); Vladyslav Iemelianchyk (UKR)	Piotr Janiak (POL); Jędrzej Brożyniak (POL) w/o	Kryštof Jan Oliva (CZE); Tadeáš Trousil (CZE)
Cortegaça Future; Cortegaça, Portugal; US$5,000; 11–14 August 2022	Calvin Ayé (FRA); Quincy Ayé (FRA); 21–12, 14–21, 15–13	João Pedrosa (POR); Hugo Campos (POR)	Javier Bello (ENG); Joaquin Bello (ENG) w/o	Philipp Huster (GER); Simon Pfretzschner (GER)
Baden Future; Baden, Austria; US$5,000; 24–28 August 2022	Julian Hörl (AUT); Alexander Horst (AUT); 21–19, 21–15	Robin Seidl (AUT); Philipp Waller (AUT)	Paul Pascariuc (AUT); Laurenz Leitner (AUT); 21–17, 22–24, 15–12	Alexander Huber (AUT); Christoph Dressler (AUT)
Montpellier Future; Montpellier, France; US$5,000; 24–28 August 2022	Rolando Hernández (VEN); Hernán Tovar (VEN); 19–21, 21–17, 15–10	Arthur Canet (FRA); Téo Rotar (FRA)	Javier Huerta (ESP); Óscar Jiménez (ESP); 21–19, 21–18	Nils Ringøen (NOR); Jo Sunde (NOR)
Warsaw Future; Warsaw, Poland; US$5,000; 1–4 September 2022	Markus Mol (NOR); Jo Sunde (NOR); 21–18, 21–17	Robert Juchnevič (LTU); Artūr Vasiljev (LTU)	Michał Korycki (POL); Michał Kądzioła (POL); 22–20, 21–19	River Day (ISR); Kevin Cuzmiciov (ISR)
Paris Elite 16; Paris, France; US$150,000; 28 September–2 October 2022	Anders Mol (NOR); Christian Sørum (NOR); 21–19, 21–18	Alexander Brouwer (NED); Robert Meeuwsen (NED)	Paolo Nicolai (ITA); Samuele Cottafava (ITA); 21–16, 21–16	Marco Grimalt (CHI); Esteban Grimalt (CHI)
Maldives Challenge; Nalaguraidhoo, Maldives; US$75,000; 13–16 October 2022	Cherif Younousse (QAT); Ahmed Tijan (QAT); 21–17, 21–15	Troy Field (USA); Chase Budinger (USA)	David Åhman (SWE); Jonatan Hellvig (SWE); 21–14, 21–18	Sergiy Popov (UKR); Eduard Reznik (UKR)
Dubai Challenge 1 Dubai, United Arab Emirates; US$75,000; 22–25 October 2022	Andrew Benesh (USA); Miles Partain (USA); 21–15, 21–17	Sergiy Popov (UKR); Eduard Reznik (UKR)	Pedro Solberg (BRA); Arthur Lanci (BRA); 15–21, 21–18, 15–12	Logan Webber (USA); Evan Cory (USA)
Dubai Challenge 2 Dubai, United Arab Emirates; US$75,000; 27–30 October 2022	David Åhman (SWE); Jonatan Hellvig (SWE); 21–17, 21–12	Tomás Capogrosso (ARG); Nicolás Capogrosso (ARG)	Taylor Crabb (USA); Paul Lotman (USA); 21–15, 21–18	Adrian Heidrich (SUI); Leo Dillier (SUI)
Sohar Future; Sohar, Oman; US$5,000; 1–4 November 2022	Abuduhalikejiang Mutailipu (CHN); Wu Jiaxin (CHN); 24–22, 21–16	Mazin Al-Hashmi (OMA); Hood Al Jalaboubi (OMA)	Edgars Točs (LAT); Kristians Fokerots (LAT); 21–18, 20–22, 15–11	Jan Dumek (CZE); Jiří Sedlák (CZE)
Cape Town Elite 16; Cape Town, South Africa; US$150,000; 3–6 November 2022	Anders Mol (NOR); Christian Sørum (NOR); 21–19, 21–19	David Åhman (SWE); Jonatan Hellvig (SWE)	Cherif Younousse (QAT); Ahmed Tijan (QAT); 22–20, 21–14	Robin Seidl (AUT); Philipp Waller (AUT)
Uberlândia Elite 16; Uberlândia, Brazil; US$150,000; 9–13 November 2022	George Wanderley (BRA); André Stein (BRA); 28–30, 21–15, 15–11	Pedro Solberg (BRA); Arthur Lanci (BRA)	Anders Mol (NOR); Christian Sørum (NOR); 21–19, 19–21, 15–10	Renato Carvalho (BRA); Vitor Felipe (BRA)
~~Red Sea Challenge~~; Al Galala, Egypt; US$75,000; 17–20 November 2022				
Torquay Challenge; Torquay, Australia; US$75,000; 23–27 November 2022	Daniele Lupo (ITA); Enrico Rossi (ITA); 21–17, 21–18	Adrian Carambula (ITA); Alex Ranghieri (ITA)	Chris McHugh (AUS); Paul Burnett (AUS); 21–18, 21–15	João Pedrosa (POR); Hugo Campos (POR)
Torquay Elite 16; Torquay, Australia; US$150,000; 29 November–3 December 2022	Youssef Krou (FRA); Arnaud Gauthier-Rat (FRA); 22–20, 23–21	Thomas Hodges (AUS); Zachery Schubert (AUS)	Adrian Carambula (ITA); Alex Ranghieri (ITA); 21–15, 21–16	Paul Lotman (USA); Miles Evans (USA)
Subic Bay Future; Olongapo, Philippines; US$5,000; 9–11 December 2022	Pithak Tipjan (THA); Poravid Taovato (THA); 21–15, 21–19	Dunwinit Kaewsai (THA); Intuch Techakijvorakul (THA)	Mārtiņš Pļaviņš (LAT); Mihails Samoilovs (LAT); 21–19, 21–17	Surin Jongklang (THA); Banlue Nakprakhong (THA)
The Hague Future; The Hague, Netherlands; US$5,000; 27–30 December 2022	Timo Hammarberg (AUT); Laurenc Grössig (AUT); 19–21, 21–16, 22–20	Samuel Cattet (FRA); Olivier Barthélémy (FRA)	Erik Nijland (NED); Matthew Immers (NED); 15–21, 23–21, 16–14	Nicolai Overgaard (DEN); Mads Møllgaard (DEN)
The Finals; Doha, Qatar; US$800,000; 26–29 January 2023	Anders Mol (NOR); Christian Sørum (NOR); 21–18, 21–18	Michał Bryl (POL); Bartosz Łosiak (POL)	Paolo Nicolai (ITA); Samuele Cottafava (ITA); 22–20, 19–21, 16–14	Alexander Brouwer (NED); Robert Meeuwsen (NED)

=== Women ===
Tournament	Champions	Runners-up	Third place	Fourth place
Tlaxcala Challenge; Tlaxcala, Mexico; US$75,000; 16–20 March 2022	Bárbara Seixas (BRA); Carolina Solberg Salgado (BRA); 21–19, 21–18	Katja Stam (NED); Raïsa Schoon (NED)	Elize Maia (BRA); Thamela Galil (BRA); 18–21, 21–17, 15–9	Taiana Lima (BRA); Hegeile Almeida (BRA)
Rosarito Elite 16; Rosarito, Mexico; US$150,000; 23–27 March 2022	Katja Stam (NED); Raïsa Schoon (NED); 21–14, 21–13	Anastasija Kravčenoka (LAT); Tīna Graudiņa (LAT)	Talita Antunes (BRA); Rebecca Cavalcante (BRA); 22–20, 21–19	Betsi Flint (USA); Kelly Cheng (USA)
Coolangatta Future; Coolangatta, Australia; US$5,000; 30 March–3 April 2022	Taryn Kloth (USA); Kristen Nuss (USA); 19–21, 21–9, 15–7	Nicole Laird (AUS); Phoebe Bell (AUS)	Toni Rodriguez (USA); Susannah Muno (USA); 24–22, 21–17	Suzuka Hashimoto (JPN); Reika Murakami (JPN)
Songkhla Future; Songkhla, Thailand; US$5,000; 14–17 April 2022	Varapatsorn Radarong (THA); Tanarattha Udomchavee (THA); 21–16, 21–12	Ren Matsumoto (JPN); Non Matsumoto (JPN)	Amanda Harnett (CAN); Alina Dormann (CAN); 15–21, 22–20, 15–9	Alisha Stevens (AUS); Caitlin Bettenay (AUS)
Itapema Challenge; Itapema, Brazil; US$75,000; 14–17 April 2022	Kelley Kolinske (USA); Sara Hughes (USA); 21–18, 21–18	Katja Stam (NED); Raïsa Schoon (NED)	Andressa Cavalcanti (BRA); Vitória Rodrigues (BRA); 21–11, 21–17	Karla Borger (GER); Julia Sude (GER)
Doha Challenge; Doha, Qatar; US$75,000; 5–8 May 2022	Bárbara Seixas (BRA); Carolina Solberg Salgado (BRA); 21–13, 21–13	Chantal Laboureur (GER); Sarah Schulz (GER)	Tanja Hüberli (SUI); Nina Brunner (SUI); 13–21, 21–19, 15–11	Taliqua Clancy (AUS); Mariafe Artacho del Solar (AUS)
Kuşadası Challenge; Kuşadası, Turkey; US$75,000; 19–22 May 2022	Taryn Kloth (USA); Kristen Nuss (USA); 21–12, 17–21, 17–15	Taliqua Clancy (AUS); Mariafe Artacho del Solar (AUS)	Terese Cannon (USA); Sarah Sponcil (USA); 21–11, 17–21, 15–12	Sandra Ittlinger (GER); Isabel Schneider (GER)
Madrid Future; Madrid, Spain; US$5,000; 19–22 May 2022	Paula Soria (ESP); Sofía González (ESP); 21–19, 21–14	Marta Menegatti (ITA); Valentina Gottardi (ITA)	Viktoria Orsi Toth (ITA); Reka Orsi Toth (ITA); 21–18, 21–17	Dorina Klinger (AUT); Ronja Klinger (AUT)
Ostrava Elite 16; Ostrava, Czech Republic; US$150,000; 25–29 May 2022	Svenja Müller (GER); Cinja Tillmann (GER); 21–18, 21–16	Talita Antunes (BRA); Rebecca Cavalcante (BRA)	Tanja Hüberli (SUI); Nina Brunner (SUI); 21–16, 21–18	Joana Heidrich (SUI); Anouk Vergé-Dépré (SUI)
Cervia Future; Cervia, Italy; US$5,000; 26–29 May 2022	Mexime van Driel (NED); Emma Piersma (NED); 21–16, 21–15	Menia Bentele (SUI); Anna Lutz (SUI)	Viktoria Orsi Toth (ITA); Reka Orsi Toth (ITA); 22–20, 21–17	Marta Menegatti (ITA); Valentina Gottardi (ITA)
Jūrmala Elite 16; Jūrmala, Latvia; US$150,000; 1–5 June 2022	Sarah Pavan (CAN); Melissa Humana-Paredes (CAN); 21–19, 20–22, 15–7	Bárbara Seixas (BRA); Carolina Solberg Salgado (BRA)	Eduarda Santos Lisboa (BRA); Ana Patrícia Ramos (BRA); 21–19, 21–17	Sara Hughes (USA); Kelley Kolinske (USA)
Klaipėda Future; Klaipėda, Lithuania; US$5,000; 2–5 June 2022	Monika Paulikienė (LIT); Erika Kliokmanaitė (LIT); 21–19, 21–18	Tjaša Kotnik (SLO); Tajda Lovšin (SLO)	Jessica Gaffney (USA); Molly Turner (USA); 22–20, 21–19	Heleene Hollas (EST); Liisa Soomets (EST)
FIVB World Championships; Rome, Italy; US$500,000; 10–19 June 2022	Eduarda Santos Lisboa (BRA); Ana Patrícia Ramos (BRA); 21–17, 21–19	Sophie Bukovec (CAN); Brandie Wilkerson (CAN)	Svenja Müller (GER); Cinja Tillmann (GER); 16–21, 21–10, 15–0	Joana Heidrich (SUI); Anouk Vergé-Dépré (SUI)
Balıkesir Future; Balıkesir, Turkey; US$5,000; 16–19 June 2022	Savannah Simo (USA); Megan Kraft (USA); 21–17, 21–12	Brook Bauer (USA); Katie Horton (USA)	Daniela Álvarez (ESP); Tania Moreno (ESP); 21–17, 21–16	Monika Paulikienė (LIT); Erika Kliokmanaitė (LIT)
Białystok Future; Białystok, Poland; US$5,000; 23–26 June 2022	Megan Kraft (USA); Emily Stockman (USA); 21–17, 34–36, 15–11	Anhelina Khmil (UKR); Tetiana Lazarenko (UKR)	Jagoda Gruszczyńska (POL); Aleksandra Wachowicz (POL); 23–21, 21–17	Brook Bauer (USA); Katie Horton (USA)
Ios Future; Ios, Greece; US$5,000; 29 June–2 July 2022	Dorina Klinger (AUT); Ronja Klinger (AUT); 20–22, 21–17, 15–11	Tjaša Kotnik (SLO); Tajda Lovšin (SLO)	Ieva Dumbauskaitė (LIT); Gerda Grudzinskaitė (LIT); 17–21, 21–10, 16–14	Katarzyna Kociołek (POL); Marta Łodej (POL)
Giardini Naxos Future; Giardini Naxos, Italy; US$5,000; 30 June–3 July 2022	Margherita Bianchin (ITA); Claudia Scampoli (ITA); 21–16, 17–21, 15–13	Sarah Cools (BEL); Lisa van den Vonder (BEL)	Valentina Calì (ITA); Margherita Tega (ITA); 21–15, 32–30	Reka Orsi Toth (ITA); Eleonora Gili (ITA)
Gstaad Elite 16; Gstaad, Switzerland; US$150,000; 6–10 July 2022	Eduarda Santos Lisboa (BRA); Ana Patrícia Ramos (BRA); 21–19, 20–22, 15–10	Bárbara Seixas (BRA); Carolina Solberg Salgado (BRA)	Taliqua Clancy (AUS); Mariafe Artacho del Solar (AUS); 22–20, 22–24, 15–9	Anastasija Kravčenoka (LAT); Tīna Graudiņa (LAT)
Lecce Future; Lecce, Italy; US$5,000; 7–10 July 2022	Miller Pata (VAN); Sherysyn Toko (VAN); 15–21, 21–19, 15–9	Marta Menegatti (ITA); Valentina Gottardi (ITA)	Cecilia Peralta (ARG); Maia Najul (ARG); 21–11, 23–21	Alisha Stevens (AUS); Georgia Johnson (AUS)
Espinho Challenge; Espinho, Portugal; US$75,000; 14–17 July 2022	Taliqua Clancy (AUS); Mariafe Artacho del Solar (AUS); 19–21, 21–19, 15–12	Corinne Quiggle (USA); Sarah Schermerhorn (USA)	Andressa Cavalcanti (BRA); Vitória Rodrigues (BRA); 21–19, 21–18	Paula Soria (ESP); Sofía González (ESP)
Cirò Marina Future; Cirò Marina, Italy; US$5,000; 14–17 July 2022	Madelyne Anderson (USA); Molly Turner (USA); 21–11, 21–18	Heleene Hollas (EST); Liisa Soomets (EST)	Valentina Calì (ITA); Margherita Tega (ITA); 16–21, 21–13, 16–14	Giulia Rubini (ITA); Giada Godenzoni (ITA)
Daegu Future; Daegu, South Korea; US$5,000; 14–17 July 2022	Dong Jie (CHN); Yuan Lvwen (CHN); 21–16, 21–13	Kana Motomura (JPN); Harumi Sakai (JPN)	Rumpaipruet Numwong (THA); Charanrutwadee Patcharamainaruebhorn (THA); 21–18, 17–21, 15–12	Miyu Sakamoto (JPN); Mayu Sawame (JPN)
Agadir Challenge; Agadir, Morocco; US$75,000; 21–24 July 2022	Emma Piersma (NED); Mexime van Driel (NED); 22–20, 21–13	Barbora Hermannová (CZE); Marie-Sára Štochlová (CZE)	Marta Menegatti (ITA); Valentina Gottardi (ITA); 21–19, 21–16	Megan McNamara (CAN); Nicole McNamara (CAN)
Leuven Future; Leuven, Belgium; US$5,000; 21–24 July 2022	Xia Xinyi (CHN); Lin Meimei (CHN); 12–21, 21–13, 15–5	Valentyna Davidova (UKR); Diana Lunina (UKR)	Yuan Lvwen (CHN); Dong Jie (CHN); 21–18, 18–21, 15–11	Tina Thurin (SWE); Sanna Thurin (SWE)
Warsaw Future; Warsaw, Poland; US$5,000; 21–24 July 2022	Anhelina Khmil (UKR); Tetiana Lazarenko (UKR); 21–17, 18–21, 15–10	Katarzyna Kociołek (POL); Marta Łodej (POL)	Brecht Piersma (NED); Wies Bekhuis (NED); 21–15, 21–13	Anna Pospíšilová (CZE); Martina Williams (CZE)
Ljubljana Future; Ljubljana, Slovenia; US$5,000; 28–31 July 2022	Zhu Lingdi (CHN); Wang Fan (CHN); 21–19, 22–24, 15–12	Tjaša Kotnik (SLO); Maja Marolt (SLO)	Xia Xinyi (CHN); Lin Meimei (CHN); 21–13, 21–12	Georgia Johnson (AUS); Alisha Stevens (AUS)
Mysłowice Future; Mysłowice, Poland; US$5,000; 28–31 July 2022	Valentyna Davidova (UKR); Diana Lunina (UKR); 21–18, 21–18	Katarzyna Kociołek (POL); Marta Łodej (POL)	Brecht Piersma (NED); Wies Bekhuis (NED); 21–18, 21–16	Zeng Jinjin (CHN); Wang Xinxin (CHN)
Hamburg Elite 16; Hamburg, Germany; US$150,000; 10–14 August 2022	Kelly Cheng (USA); Betsi Flint (USA); 21–19, 21–18	Nina Brunner (SUI); Tanja Hüberli (SUI)	Karla Borger (GER); Julia Sude (GER); 10–21, 23–21, 15–11	Bárbara Seixas (BRA); Carolina Solberg Salgado (BRA)
Budapest Future; Budapest, Hungary; US$5,000; 11–14 August 2022	Zeng Jinjin (CHN); Wang Xinxin (CHN); 19–21, 22–20, 15–13	Xia Xinyi (CHN); Lin Meimei (CHN)	Franziska Friedl (AUT); Katharina Holzer (AUT); 21–18, 21–0	Michaela Břínková (CZE); Michala Frank (CZE)
Cortegaça Future; Cortegaça, Portugal; US$5,000; 11–14 August 2022	Dong Jie (CHN); Yuan Lvwen (CHN); 21–16, 21–15	Nele Schmitt (GER); Melanie Paul (GER)	Miroslava Dunárová (CZE); Daniela Resová (CZE); 21–18, 20–22, 16–14	Anete Namiķe (LAT); Līva Ēbere (LAT)
Baden Future; Baden, Austria; US$5,000; 24–27 August 2022	Iryna Makhno (UKR); Inna Makhno (UKR); 18–21, 22–20, 20–18	Zeng Jinjin (CHN); Wang Xinxin (CHN)	Anna-Lena Grüne (GER); Chenoa Christ (GER); 21–16, 21–14	Zhu Lingdi (CHN); Lin Meimei (CHN)
Paris Elite 16; Paris, France; US$150,000; 28 September–2 October 2022	Katja Stam (NED); Raïsa Schoon (NED); 21–16, 22–20	Anastasija Samoilova (LAT); Tīna Graudiņa (LAT)	Eduarda Santos Lisboa (BRA); Ana Patrícia Ramos (BRA); 21–12, 13–21, 15–8	Betsi Flint (USA); Kelly Cheng (USA)
Maldives Challenge; Nalaguraidhoo, Maldives; US$75,000; 13–16 October 2022	Taru Lahti-Liukkonen (FIN); Niina Ahtiainen (FIN); 21–16, 23–21	Katharina Schützenhöfer (AUT); Lena Plesiutschnig (AUT)	Anniina Parkkinen (FIN); Sara Sinisalo (FIN); 21–18, 20–22, 15–13	Emily Stockman (USA); Megan Kraft (USA)
Dubai Challenge 1 Dubai, United Arab Emirates; US$75,000; 22–25 October 2022	Barbora Hermannová (CZE); Marie-Sára Štochlová (CZE); 18–21, 21–17, 15–12	Xia Xinyi (CHN); Lin Meimei (CHN)	Katie Horton (USA); Julia Scoles (USA); 26–24, 24–20	Taravadee Naraphornrapat (THA); Worapeerachayakorn Kongphopsarutawadee (THA)
Dubai Challenge 2 Dubai, United Arab Emirates; US$75,000; 27–30 October 2022	Isabel Schneider (GER); Julia Sude (GER); 21–17, 21–14	Molly Turner (USA); Madelyne Anderson (USA)	Taravadee Naraphornrapat (THA); Worapeerachayakorn Kongphopsarutawadee (THA); 21–10, 21–18	Katie Horton (USA); Julia Scoles (USA)
Cape Town Elite 16; Cape Town, South Africa; US$150,000; 3–6 November 2022	Talita Antunes (BRA); Thamela Galil (BRA); 22–20, 21–16	Terese Cannon (USA); Sarah Sponcil (USA)	Eduarda Santos Lisboa (BRA); Ana Patrícia Ramos (BRA); 21–15, 21–15	Lézana Placette (FRA); Alexia Richard (FRA)
Uberlândia Elite 16; Uberlândia, Brazil; US$150,000; 9–13 November 2022	Eduarda Santos Lisboa (BRA); Ana Patrícia Ramos (BRA); 21–17, 27–29, 15–11	Andressa Cavalcanti (BRA); Vitória Rodrigues (BRA)	Carolina Solberg Salgado (BRA); Bárbara Seixas (BRA); 21–19, 17–21, 15–13	Taiana Lima (BRA); Hegeile Almeida (BRA)
~~Red Sea Challenge~~; Al Galala, Egypt; US$75,000; 17–20 November 2022				
Torquay Challenge; Torquay, Australia; US$75,000; 23–27 November 2022	Sara Hughes (USA); Kelly Cheng (USA); 21–11, 21–16	Yuan Lvwen (CHN); Dong Jie (CHN)	Xia Xinyi (CHN); Lin Meimei (CHN); 19–21, 21–14, 15–9	Emily Stockman (USA); Megan Kraft (USA)
Torquay Elite 16; Torquay, Australia; US$150,000; 29 November–3 December 2022	Sara Hughes (USA); Kelly Cheng (USA); 21–17, 21–11	Betsi Flint (USA); Julia Scoles (USA)	Taliqua Clancy (AUS); Mariafe Artacho del Solar (AUS); 21–14, 19–21, 15–13	Kristen Nuss (USA); Taryn Kloth (USA)
Subic Bay Future; Olongapo, Philippines; US$5,000; 9–11 December 2022	Sisi Rondina (PHI); Jovelyn Gonzaga (PHI); 22–24, 21–12, 15–12	Floremel Rodriguez (PHI); Genesa Eslapor (PHI)	Miyu Sakamoto (JPN); Mayu Sawame (JPN); 21–15, 21–18	Anita Dave (ISR); Yahli Ashush (ISR)
The Hague Future; The Hague, Netherlands; US$5,000; 27–30 December 2022	Brecht Piersma (NED); Emi van Driel (NED); 21–13, 21–11	Chenoa Christ (GER); Kim van de Velde (GER)	Monika Paulikienė (LIT); Ainė Raupelytė (LIT); 21–13, 20–22, 15–13	Wies Bekhuis (NED); Pleun Ypma (NED)
The Finals; Doha, Qatar; US$800,000; 26–29 January 2023	Sara Hughes (USA); Kelly Cheng (USA); 21–18, 21–16	Eduarda Santos Lisboa (BRA); Ana Patrícia Ramos (BRA)	Katja Stam (NED); Raïsa Schoon (NED); 21–18, 21–10	Taliqua Clancy (AUS); Mariafe Artacho del Solar (AUS)

== Medal table by country ==
Rank	Nation	Gold	Silver	Bronze	Total
1	United States	11	8	5	24
2	Brazil	8	7	11	26
3	Italy	6	6	9	21
4	Netherlands	6	5	8	19
5	Poland	6	5	5	16
6	China	6	4	3	13
7	Norway	6	1	2	9
8	Austria	4	3	3	10
9	Ukraine	3	6	1	10
10	Lithuania	3	1	3	7
11	Argentina	3	1	1	5
12	Australia	2	5	5	12
13	Germany	2	4	5	11
14	Czech Republic	2	4	1	7
15	Switzerland	2	2	3	7
16	France	2	2	0	4
17	Thailand	2	1	2	5
18	Qatar	2	1	1	4
18	Sweden	2	1	1	4
20	Canada	1	2	1	4
21	New Zealand	1	1	2	4
21	Spain	1	1	2	4
23	Chile	1	1	0	2
23	Philippines	1	1	0	2
25	Finland	1	0	3	4
26	Serbia	1	0	0	1
26	Vanuatu	1	0	0	1
26	Venezuela	1	0	0	1
29	Slovenia	0	3	0	3
30	Latvia	0	2	4	6
31	Israel	0	2	1	3
31	Japan	0	2	1	3
33	Belgium	0	2	0	2
34	Estonia	0	1	0	1
34	Oman	0	1	0	1
34	Portugal	0	1	0	1
37	England	0	0	3	3
38	Denmark	0	0	1	1
Totals (38 entries)		87	87	87	261
