= 2018 FIVB Beach Volleyball World Tour =

Tournament details
- Host country: Various
- Dates: September, 2017 – August, 2018
- Venues: 47 (in 46 host cities)

The 2018 FIVB Beach Volleyball World Tour was the global elite professional beach volleyball circuit organized by the Fédération Internationale de Volleyball (FIVB) for the 2018 beach volleyball season. Starts in September 2017 after the end of the year season, the 2018 FIVB Beach Volleyball World Tour Calendar comprised three FIVB World Tour 5-star tournaments, eight 4-star, six 3-star, seven 2-star, twenty-two 1-star events and the World Tour Finals, all organised by the FIVB.

== Schedule ==
Key

World Tour Finals
5-star tournament/Major Series
4-star tournament
3-star tournament
2-star tournament
1-star tournament

=== Men ===
Tournament	Champions	Runners-up	Third place	Fourth place
Montpellier Open; Montpellier, France; US$10,000; 7–9 September 2017	Nejc Zemljak (SLO); Jan Pokeršnik (SLO); 26–24, 21–14	Ondřej Perušič (CZE); David Schweiner (CZE)	Youssef Krou (FRA); Quincy Ayé (FRA); 21–16, 18–21, 15–12	Lazar Kolarić (SRB); Đorđe Klašnić (SRB)
Qinzhou Open; Qinzhou, China; US$75,000; 11–15 October 2017	Maxim Sivolap (RUS); Igor Velichko (RUS); 19–21, 21–19, 20–18	Juan Virgen (MEX); Lombardo Ontiveros (MEX)	Nivaldo Díaz (CUB); Sergio González (CUB); 16–21, 21–16, 15–11	Dries Koekelkoren (BEL); Tom van Walle (BEL)
Aalsmeer Open; Aalsmeer, Netherlands; US$10,000; 25–29 October 2017	Marco Caminati (ITA); Enrico Rossi (ITA); 21–18, 21–15	William Kolinske (USA); Miles Evans (USA)	Hasan Hüseyin Mermer (TUR); Murat Giginoğlu (TUR); 13–21, 21–19, 18–16	Sergiy Popov (UKR); Oleksii Denin (UKR)
Sydney Open; Sydney, Australia; US$50,000; 22–25 November 2017	Ben Saxton (CAN); Grant O'Gorman (CAN); 21–8, 21–16	Youssef Krou (FRA); Quincy Ayé (FRA)	William Kolinske (USA); Miles Evans (USA); 21–16, 13–21, 15–11	Christopher McHugh (AUS); Damien Schumann (AUS)
Dela Beach Open; The Hague, Netherlands; US$150,000; 3–7 January 2018	Mārtiņš Pļaviņš (LAT); Edgars Točs (LAT); 21–14, 21–12	Piotr Kantor (POL); Bartosz Łosiak (POL)	Alexander Brouwer (NED); Robert Meeuwsen (NED); 21–18, 21–14	Christiaan Varenhorst (NED); Jasper Bouter (NED)
Shepparton Open; Shepparton, Australia; US$10,000; 1–4 February 2018	Chase Frishman (USA); James Avery Drost (USA); 21–17, 21–15	Christopher McHugh (AUS); Damien Schumann (AUS)	Cole Durant (AUS); Zachery Schubert (AUS); 21–10, 21–13	Armin Dollinger (GER); Simon Kulzer (GER)
Kish Island Open; Kish Island, Iran; US$75,000; 20–24 February 2018	Mariusz Prudel (POL); Jakub Szałankiewicz (POL); 21–18, 24–22	Mārtiņš Pļaviņš (LAT); Edgars Točs (LAT)	Alexander Walkenhorst (GER); Sven Winter (GER); 21–18, 21–11	Julian Hörl (AUT); Tobias Winter (AUT)
Fort Lauderdale Major; Fort Lauderdale, USA; US$300,000; 27 February–4 March 2018	Phil Dalhausser (USA); Nick Lucena (USA); 21–12, 21–17	Paolo Nicolai (ITA); Daniele Lupo (ITA)	Aleksandrs Samoilovs (LAT); Jānis Šmēdiņš (LAT); 21–17, 21–17	Pedro Solberg Salgado (BRA); George Wanderley (BRA)
KATARA Beach Volleyball Cup; Doha, Qatar; US$150,000; 6–10 March 2018	Alexander Brouwer (NED); Robert Meeuwsen (NED); 20–22, 21–14, 15–11	Oleg Stoyanovskiy (RUS); Igor Velichko (RUS)	Cherif Younousse (QAT); Ahmed Tijan (QAT); 21–19, 19–21, 15–13	Phil Dalhausser (USA); Nick Lucena (USA)
Oman Open; Muscat, Oman; US$10,000; 14–17 March 2018	Philipp Bergmann (GER); Yannick Harms (GER); 21–18, 21–11	Rahman Raoufi (IRI); Bahman Salemi (IRI)	Tiziano Andreatta (ITA); Andrea Abbiati (ITA); 21–19, 21–9	Nouh Al-Jalbubi (OMA); Mazin Al-Hashmi (OMA)
Blooming Beach Aalsmeer; Aalsmeer, Netherlands; US$10,000; 15–18 March 2018	Alexander Brouwer (NED); Robert Meeuwsen (NED); 21–15, 21–19	Christiaan Varenhorst (NED); Jasper Bouter (NED)	Dirk Boehlé (NED); Steven van de Velde (NED); 21–17, 21–19	Ben O'Dea (NZL); Sam O'Dea (NZL)
SMM Pak Bara Beach Satun; Satun, Thailand; US$10,000; 8–11 April 2018	Nuttanon Inkiew (THA); Sedtawat Padsawud (THA); 21–19, 21–16	Ade Rachmawan (INA); Mohammad Ashfiya (INA)	Rahman Raoufi (IRI); Abolhamed Mirzaali (IRI); 21–17, 21–13	Zachery Schubert (AUS); Tim Dickson (AUS)
Xiamen Open; Xiamen, China; US$150,000; 18–22 April 2018	Oleg Stoyanovskiy (RUS); Igor Velichko (RUS); 21–18, 21–19	Viacheslav Krasilnikov (RUS); Nikita Lyamin (RUS)	Alison Cerutti (BRA); Bruno Oscar Schmidt (BRA); 21–15, 21–13	Piotr Kantor (POL); Bartosz Łosiak (POL)
Langkawi Open; Langkawi, Malaysia; US$10,000; 26–29 April 2018	Simon Frühbauer (AUT); Jörg Wutzl (AUT); 21–15, 18–21, 15–13	Petr Bakhnar (RUS); Taras Myskiv (RUS)	Nuttanon Inkiew (THA); Sedtawat Padsawud (THA); 21–13, 21–16	Paul Becker (GER); Eric Stadie (GER)
Huntington Beach Open; Huntington Beach, USA; US$150,000; 2–6 May 2018	Alexander Brouwer (NED); Robert Meeuwsen (NED); 21–16, 21–15	Evandro Oliveira (BRA); André Stein (BRA)	Pablo Herrera (ESP); Adrián Gavira (ESP); 22–20, 21–17	Aleksandrs Samoilovs (LAT); Jānis Šmēdiņš (LAT)
Mersin Open; Mersin, Turkey; US$75,000; 2–6 May 2018	Ilya Leshukov (RUS); Konstantin Semenov (RUS); 14–21, 21–12, 18–16	Ondřej Perušič (CZE); David Schweiner (CZE)	Nivaldo Díaz (CUB); Sergio González (CUB); 21–14, 21–15	Adrian Heidrich (SUI); Mirco Gerson (SUI)
Manila Open; Manila, Philippines; US$10,000; 3–6 May 2018	Max-Jonas Karpa (GER); Milan Sievers (GER); 15–21, 23–21, 15–9	Petr Bakhnar (RUS); Taras Myskiv (RUS)	Gabriel Kissling (SUI); Michiel Zandbergen (SUI); 22–20, 19–21, 15–13	Alejandro Huerta (ESP); Javier Huerta (ESP)
Lucerne Open; Lucerne, Switzerland; US$75,000; 9–13 May 2018	John Mayer (USA); Trevor Crabb (USA); 21–10, 21–16	Stefan Basta (SRB); Lazar Kolarić (SRB)	Adrian Heidrich (SUI); Mirco Gerson (SUI); 21–19, 21–13	Ade Rachmawan (INA); Mohammad Ashfiya (INA)
Bangkok Open; Bangkok, Thailand; US$10,000; 10–13 May 2018	Takumi Takahashi (JPN); Yusuke Ishijima (JPN); 21–15, 21–14	Daniel Müllner (AUT); Florian Schnetzer (AUT)	Alejandro Huerta (ESP); Javier Huerta (ESP); 21–18, 19–21, 18–16	Aleksandr Kramarenko (RUS); Taras Myskiv (RUS)
Itapema Open; Itapema, Brazil; US$150,000; 16–20 May 2018	Evandro Oliveira (BRA); André Stein (BRA); 21–18, 21–16	Anders Mol (NOR); Christian Sørum (NOR)	Piotr Kantor (POL); Bartosz Łosiak (POL); 21–19, 21–17	Vitor Felipe (BRA); Gustavo Carvalhaes (BRA)
Aydin Open; Aydın, Turkey; US$10,000; 17–20 May 2018	Stefan Basta (SRB); Lazar Kolarić (SRB); 16–21, 25–23, 16–14	Rahman Raoufi (IRI); Abolhamed Mirzaali (IRI)	Ruslan Bykanov (RUS); Maksim Hudyakov (RUS); 23–21, 21–14	Sefa Urlu (TUR); Hasan Hüseyin Mermer (TUR)
Miguel Pereira Open; Miguel Pereira, Brazil; US$10,000; 24–27 May 2018	Vinícius Freitas (BRA); Luciano de Paula (BRA); 22–24, 21–18, 15–6	Rodrigo Bernat (BRA); Harley Marques Silva (BRA)	Ramon Gomes (BRA); Álvaro Andrade (BRA); 21–14, 21–14	Felipe Numasawa (BRA); Vinícius Araújo (BRA)
Jinjiang Open; Jinjiang, China; US$50,000; 31 May–3 June 2018	Trevor Crabb (USA); John Mayer (USA); 21–13, 18–21, 17–15	Nils Ehlers (GER); Lorenz Schümann (GER)	Gao Peng (CHN); Li Yang (CHN); 21–16, 21–11	Max Betzien (GER); Jonathan Erdmann (GER)
Alanya Open; Alanya, Turkey; US$10,000; 31 May–3 June 2018	Maksim Hudyakov (RUS); Ruslan Bykanov (RUS); 21–13, 16–21, 15–11	Volkan Gögtepe (TUR); Murat Giginoğlu (TUR)	Oleksii Denin (UKR); Denys Denysenko (UKR); 18–21, 21–14, 17–15	Florian Breer (SUI); Yves Haussener (SUI)
Baden Open; Baden, Austria; US$10,000; 13–17 June 2018	Clemens Doppler (AUT); Alexander Horst (AUT); 21–18, 21–16, 15–13	Tobias Winter (AUT); Julian Hörl (AUT)	Anders Mol (NOR); Bjarne Huus (NOR); 21–14, 21–19	Martin Ermacora (AUT); Moritz Pristauz (AUT)
Manavgat Open; Manavgat, Turkey; US$10,000; 20–23 June 2018	Oscar Guimarães (BRA); Luciano de Paula (BRA); 21–14, 23–21	Kristoffer Abell (DEN); Daniel Thomsen (DEN)	Jannes van der Ham (NED); Sven Vismans (NED); 14–21, 21–16, 15–11	Alejandro Huerta (ESP); Javier Huerta (ESP)
Ostrava Open; Ostrava, Czech Republic; US$150,000; 20–24 June 2018	Pablo Herrera (ESP); Adrián Gavira (ESP); 27–25, 15–21, 15–11	Piotr Kantor (POL); Bartosz Łosiak (POL)	Konstantin Semenov (RUS); Ilya Leshukov (RUS); 14–21, 21–16, 15–11	Ondřej Perušič (CZE); David Schweiner (CZE)
Singapore Open presented by Neo Group; Singapore; US$50,000; 21–24 June 2018	Gao Peng (CHN); Li Yang (CHN); 21–14, 21–18	Kusti Nõlvak (EST); Mart Tiisaar (EST)	Ade Rachmawan (INA); Mohammad Ashfiya (INA); 28–26, 22–20	Nejc Zemljak (SLO); Jan Pokeršnik (SLO)
Poland Open; Warsaw, Poland; US$150,000; 27 June–1 July 2018	Piotr Kantor (POL); Bartosz Łosiak (POL); 27–29, 21–13, 15–12	Vitor Felipe (BRA); Evandro Oliveira (BRA)	Jānis Šmēdiņš (LAT); Aleksandrs Samoilovs (LAT); 21–18, 18–21, 17–15	Alexander Brouwer (NED); Robert Meeuwsen (NED)
Espinho Open; Espinho, Portugal; US$150,000; 4–8 July 2018	Jānis Šmēdiņš (LAT); Aleksandrs Samoilovs (LAT); 21–13, 19–21, 22–20	Ricardo Santos (BRA); Gustavo Carvalhaes (BRA)	Julius Thole (GER); Clemens Wickler (GER); 17–21, 21–12, 15–11	Vitor Felipe (BRA); Evandro Oliveira (BRA)
Anapa Open; Anapa, Russia; US$10,000; 5–8 July 2018	Abuduhalikejiang Mutailipu (CHN); Wu Jiaxin (CHN); 21–9, 19–21, 15–9	Li Zhuoxin (CHN); Zhou Chaowei (CHN)	Gao Peng (CHN); Li Yang (CHN); 21–16, 17–21, 15–12	Ivan Golovin (RUS); Taras Myskiv (RUS)
Porec Open; Poreč, Croatia; US$10,000; 5–8 July 2018	Sergiy Popov (UKR); Vladyslav Iemelianchyk (UKR); 21–19, 17–21, 21–19	Jörg Wutzl (AUT); Simon Frühbauer (AUT)	Toms Šmēdiņš (LAT); Haralds Regža (LAT); 21–14, 25–23	Kristaps Šmits (LAT); Mihails Samoilovs (LAT)
Gstaad Major; Gstaad, Switzerland; US$300,000; 9–14 July 2018	Anders Mol (NOR); Christian Sørum (NOR); 21–18, 21–12	Pablo Herrera (ESP); Adrián Gavira (ESP)	Paolo Nicolai (ITA); Daniele Lupo (ITA); 17–21, 21–16, 20–18	Taylor Crabb (USA); Jake Gibb (USA)
Haiyang Open; Haiyang, China; US$75,000; 18–22 July 2018	Robin Seidl (AUT); Philipp Waller (AUT); 10–21, 25–23, 15–8	George Wanderley (BRA); Thiago Barbosa (BRA)	Abuduhalikejiang Mutailipu (CHN); Wu Jiaxin (CHN); 21–13, 21–13	Álvaro Morais Filho (BRA); Luciano de Paula (BRA)
3Star in Tokyo; Tokyo, Japan; US$75,000; 25–29 July 2018	Esteban Grimalt (CHI); Marco Grimalt (CHI); 21–12, 21–17	Lazar Kolarić (SRB); Stefan Basta (SRB)	Casey Patterson (USA); Stafford Slick (USA); 18–21, 21–13, 15–10	Philipp Bergmann (GER); Yannick Harms (GER)
Agadir Open; Agadir, Morocco; US$50,000; 26–29 July 2018	Maksim Hudyakov (RUS); Ruslan Bykanov (RUS); 21–15, 16–21, 17–15	Alexander Huber (AUT); Christoph Dressler (AUT)	Nicolás Capogrosso (ARG); Julián Azaad (ARG); 21–17, 21–19	Arnas Rumševičius (LTU); Lukas Každailis (LTU)
Samsun Open; Samsun, Turkey; US$10,000; 26–29 July 2018	Jindřich Weiss (CZE); Donovan Džavoronok (CZE); 21–11, 21–18	Marcel Mysliveček (CZE); Martin Pihera (CZE)	Stefan Boermans (NED); Casper Haanappel (NED); 21–14, 22–20	Thomas Kunert (AUT); Peter Eglseer (AUT)
Vienna Major; Vienna, Austria; US$300,000; 30 July–5 August 2018	Anders Mol (NOR); Christian Sørum (NOR); 21–12, 21–17	Michał Bryl (POL); Grzegorz Fijałek (POL)	Cherif Younousse (QAT); Ahmed Tijan (QAT); 25–23, 17–21, 15–12	Alexander Brouwer (NED); Robert Meeuwsen (NED)
Ljubljana Open; Ljubljana, Slovenia; US$10,000; 3–5 August 2018	Valeriy Samoday (RUS); Taras Myskiv (RUS); 21–14, 21–17	Nejc Zemljak (SLO); Jan Pokeršnik (SLO)	Florian Breer (SUI); Yves Haussener (SUI); 17–21, 21–13, 15–10	Danijel Pokeršnik (SLO); Tadej Bozenk (SLO)
Moscow Open; Moscow, Russia; US$150,000; 8–12 August 2018	Jānis Šmēdiņš (LAT); Aleksandrs Samoilovs (LAT); 21–18, 21–13	Alison Cerutti (BRA); André Stein (BRA)	Igor Velichko (RUS); Oleg Stoyanovskiy (RUS); 21–12, 21–10	Vitor Felipe (BRA); Evandro Oliveira (BRA)
Vaduz Open; Vaduz, Liechtenstein; US$10,000; 9–12 August 2018	Taras Myskiv (RUS); Valeriy Samoday (RUS); 29–31, 21–17, 15–11	Florian Breer (SUI); Yves Haussener (SUI)	Sergiy Popov (UKR); Vladyslav Iemelianchyk (UKR); 21–12, 21–16	Mateusz Paszkowski (POL); Mateusz Łysikowski (POL)
FIVB World Tour Finals; Hamburg, Germany; US$400,000; 15–18 August 2018	Anders Mol (NOR); Christian Sørum (NOR); 21–19, 21–17	Michał Bryl (POL); Grzegorz Fijałek (POL)	Piotr Kantor (POL); Bartosz Łosiak (POL); 19–21, 21–15, 15–13	Julius Thole (GER); Clemens Wickler (GER)

=== Women ===
Tournament	Champions	Runners-up	Third place	Fourth place
Qinzhou Open; Qinzhou, China; US$75,000; 11–15 October 2017	Mariafe Artacho (AUS); Taliqua Clancy (AUS); 21–11, 21–12	Kinga Kołosińska (POL); Katarzyna Kociołek (POL)	Brooke Sweat (USA); Summer Ross (USA); 21–18, 21–13	Wang Fan (CHN); Xia Xinyi (CHN)
Aalsmeer Open; Aalsmeer, Netherlands; US$10,000; 25–29 October 2017	Joy Stubbe (NED); Madelein Meppelink (NED); 21–18, 21–18	Kim Behrens (GER); Sandra Ittlinger (GER)	Betsi Flint (USA); Kelley Larsen (USA); 25–23, 21–18	Miki Ishii (JPN); Megumi Murakami (JPN)
Sydney Open; Sydney, Australia; US$50,000; 23–26 November 2017	Mariafe Artacho (AUS); Taliqua Clancy (AUS); 21–17, 21–14	Wang Fan (CHN); Xia Xinyi (CHN)	Katharina Schützenhöfer (AUT); Lena Plesiutschnig (AUT); 16–21, 24–22, 15–10	Akiko Hasegawa (JPN); Azusa Futami (JPN)
Dela Beach Open; The Hague, Netherlands; US$150,000; 3–7 January 2018	Alexandra Klineman (USA); April Ross (USA); 21–12, 21–15	Maria Antonelli (BRA); Carolina Solberg Salgado (BRA)	Nina Betschart (SUI); Tanja Hüberli (SUI); 21–18, 21–10	Barbora Hermannová (CZE); Markéta Sluková (CZE)
Shepparton Open; Shepparton, Australia; US$10,000; 1–4 February 2018	Amanda Dowdy (USA); Irene Pollock (USA); 21–17, 18–21, 15–12	Jace Pardon (USA); Caitlin Ledoux (USA)	Marta Menegatti (ITA); Laura Giombini (ITA); 23–21, 21–15	Shaunna Marie Polley (NZL); Kelsie Wills (NZL)
Fort Lauderdale Major; Fort Lauderdale, USA; US$300,000; 27 February–3 March 2018	Bárbara Seixas (BRA); Fernanda Alves (BRA); 21–16, 21–13	Taiana Lima (BRA); Carolina Horta (BRA)	Brooke Sweat (USA); Summer Ross (USA); 21–17, 21–13	Isabel Schneider (GER); Victoria Bieneck (GER)
SMM Pak Bara Beach Satun; Satun, Thailand; US$10,000; 8–11 April 2018	Caitlin Ledoux (USA); Emily Stockman (USA); 19–21, 21–16, 15–8	Tatyana Mashkova (KAZ); Irina Tsimbalova (KAZ)	Rumpaipruet Numwong (THA); Khanittha Hongpak (THA); 21–19, 24–22	Dhita Juliana (INA); Putu Utami (INA)
Xiamen Open; Xiamen, China; US$150,000; 18–22 April 2018	Sarah Pavan (CAN); Melissa Humana-Paredes (CAN); 21–19, 21–14	Kelly Claes (USA); Brittany Hochevar (USA)	Mariafe Artacho (AUS); Taliqua Clancy (AUS); 21–18, 21–17	Ágatha Bednarczuk (BRA); Eduarda Lisboa (BRA)
Langkawi Open; Langkawi, Malaysia; US$10,000; 26–29 April 2018	Ksenia Dabizha (RUS); Daria Mastikova (RUS); 21–10, 29–27	Katja Stam (NED); Julia Wouters (NED)	Phoebe Bell (AUS); Jessyka Ngauamo (AUS); 21–14, 21–17	Martina Bonnerová (CZE); Tereza Pluhařová (CZE)
Huntington Beach Open; Huntington Beach, USA; US$150,000; 2–6 May 2018	Bárbara Seixas (BRA); Fernanda Alves (BRA); 16–21, 21–15, 15–9	Maria Antonelli (BRA); Carolina Solberg Salgado (BRA)	Chantal Laboureur (GER); Julia Sude (GER); 35–33, 21–16	Sarah Pavan (CAN); Melissa Humana-Paredes (CAN)
Mersin Open; Mersin, Turkey; US$75,000; 2–6 May 2018	Lena Plesiutschnig (AUT); Katharina Schützenhöfer (AUT); 18–21, 25–23, 15–12	Sanne Keizer (NED); Madelein Meppelink (NED)	Andrea Štrbová (SVK); Natália Dubovcová (SVK); 23–21, 21–17	Josemari Alves (BRA); Liliane Maestrini (BRA)
Manila Open; Manila, Philippines; US$10,000; 3–6 May 2018	Ayumi Kusano (JPN); Takemi Nishibori (JPN); 21–14, 21–18	Paula Soria (ESP); María Belén Carro (ESP)	Érika Mongelós (PAR); Michelle Valiente (PAR); 21–17, 21–16	Shinako Tanaka (JPN); Sakurako Fujii (JPN)
Anchor International Beach Volleyball Carnival Phnom Penh; Phnom Penh, Cambodia; US$50,000; 4–6 May 2018	Anna Behlen (GER); Sarah Schneider (GER); 17–21, 21–9, 15–8	Sayaka Mizoe (JPN); Suzuka Hashimoto (JPN)	Ksenia Dabizha (RUS); Daria Mastikova (RUS); 21–19, 21–8	Julia Tilley (AUS); Alice Bain (AUS)
Tuan Chau HaLong Open; Tuần Châu, Vietnam; US$10,000; 9–12 May 2018	Sayaka Mizoe (JPN); Suzuka Hashimoto (JPN); 25–23, 18–21, 15–13	Yui Nagata (JPN); Minori Kumada (JPN)	Yukako Suzuki (JPN); Kaho Sakaguchi (JPN); 21–18, 17–21, 15–13	Sofia Starikov (ISR); Noy Chorin (ISR)
Lucerne Open; Lucerne, Switzerland; US$75,000; 9–13 May 2018	Mariafe Artacho (AUS); Taliqua Clancy (AUS); 21–12, 21–18	Wang Fan (CHN); Xia Xinyi (CHN)	Emily Stockman (USA); Kelley Larsen (USA); 19–21, 21–17, 15–9	Joy Stubbe (NED); Marleen van Iersel (NED)
Bangkok Open; Bangkok, Thailand; US$10,000; 10–13 May 2018	Bree Scarbrough (USA); Aurora Davis (USA); 21–13, 17–21, 15–8	Paula Soria (ESP); María Belén Carro (ESP)	Ayumi Kusano (JPN); Takemi Nishibori (JPN); 21–15, 21–13	Megan McNamara (CAN); Nicole McNamara (CAN)
Itapema Open; Itapema, Brazil; US$150,000; 16–20 May 2018	Ágatha Bednarczuk (BRA); Eduarda Lisboa (BRA); 21–19, 21–17	Joana Heidrich (SUI); Anouk Vergé-Dépré (SUI)	Heather Bansley (CAN); Brandie Wilkerson (CAN); 21–18, 18–21, 15–11	Maria Antonelli (BRA); Carolina Solberg Salgado (BRA)
Aydin Open; Aydın, Turkey; US$10,000; 17–20 May 2018	Leila Martínez (CUB); Mailen Deliz (CUB); 21–18, 21–16	Ksenia Dabizha (RUS); Daria Mastikova (RUS)	Kristina Thurin (SWE); Susanna Thurin (SWE); 18–21, 26–24, 15–11	Tadva Yoken (SWE); Sigrid Simonsson (SWE)
Miguel Pereira Open; Miguel Pereira, Brazil; US$10,000; 24–27 May 2018	Adriana Maria Matei (ROU); Beata Vaida (ROU); 21–13, 21–19	Aline Lebioda (BRA); Diana Silva (BRA)	Tainá Bigi (BRA); Victoria Tosta (BRA); 21–18, 21–19	Naiana Araújo (BRA); Rachel Nunes (BRA)
Jinjiang Open; Jinjiang, China; US$50,000; 31 May–3 June 2018	Sayaka Mizoe (JPN); Suzuka Hashimoto (JPN); 21–13, 19–21, 15–5	Kou Nai-han (TPE); Liu Pi-hsin (TPE)	Chiyo Suzuki (JPN); Reika Murakami (JPN); 21–12, 22–20	Bree Scarbrough (USA); Aurora Davis (USA)
Alanya Open; Alanya, Turkey; US$10,000; 31 May–3 June 2018	Sarah Schneider (GER); Viktoria Seeber (GER); 18–21, 21–13, 15–13	Aleyna Vence (TUR); Buğra Eryıldız (TUR)	Daria Rudykh (RUS); Elizaveta Zayonchkovskaya (RUS); 21–15, 13–21, 15–12	Silvia Costantini (ITA); Gaia Traballi (ITA)
Silk Road Nantong Open; Nantong, China; US$50,000; 7–10 June 2018	Josemari Alves (BRA); Liliane Maestrini (BRA); 21–13, 19–21, 15–12	Agata Zuccarelli (ITA); Gaia Traballi (ITA)	Jessyka Ngauamo (AUS); Phoebe Bell (AUS); 21–17, 21–18	Ayumi Kusano (JPN); Takemi Nishibori (JPN)
Baden Open; Baden, Austria; US$10,000; 14–16 June 2018	Teresa Mersmann (GER); Cinja Tillmann (GER); 21–17, 21–16	Lena Plesiutschnig (AUT); Katharina Schützenhöfer (AUT)	Emilie Olimstad (NOR); Janne Pedersen (NOR); 21–16, 21–16	Marta Ozoliņa (LAT); Agnese Caica (LAT)
Silk Road Tangshan Open; Nanjing, China; US$50,000; 14–17 June 2018	Josemari Alves (BRA); Liliane Maestrini (BRA); 21–18, 21–23, 15–11	Wang Fan (CHN); Xia Xinyi (CHN)	Amanda Dowdy (USA); Irene Pollock (USA); 21–19, 16–21, 16–14	Lin Meimei (CHN); Zhu Lingdi (CHN)
Manavgat Open; Manavgat, Turkey; US$10,000; 20–23 June 2018	Satono Ishitsubo (JPN); Asami Shiba (JPN); 17–21, 21–13, 21–19	Sarah Cools (BEL); Lisa van den Vonder (BEL)	Merve Nezir (TUR); Aleyna Vence (TUR); 9–21, 21–16, 15–12	Erika Habaguchi (JPN); Yurika Sakaguchi (JPN)
Ostrava Open; Ostrava, Czech Republic; US$150,000; 20–24 June 2018	Barbora Hermannová (CZE); Markéta Sluková (CZE); 17–21, 21–15, 15–13	Heather Bansley (CAN); Brandie Wilkerson (CAN)	Karla Borger (GER); Margareta Kozuch (GER); 21–19, 21–18	Victoria Bieneck (GER); Isabel Schneider (GER)
Singapore Open presented by Neo Group; Singapore; US$50,000; 21–24 June 2018	Chiyo Suzuki (JPN); Reika Murakami (JPN); 23–21, 21–15	Ayumi Kusano (JPN); Takemi Nishibori (JPN)	Anna Behlen (GER); Sarah Schneider (GER); 27–25, 13–21, 15–11	Tadva Yoken (SWE); Sigrid Simonsson (SWE)
Poland Open; Warsaw, Poland; US$150,000; 27 June–1 July 2018	Heather Bansley (CAN); Brandie Wilkerson (CAN); 21–17, 21–17	Chantal Laboureur (GER); Julia Sude (GER)	Ágatha Bednarczuk (BRA); Eduarda Lisboa (BRA); 21–17, 21–18	Brittany Hochevar (USA); Kelly Claes (USA)
Espinho Open; Espinho, Portugal; US$150,000; 4–7 July 2018	Mariafe Artacho (AUS); Taliqua Clancy (AUS); 23–21, 21–17	Maria Antonelli (BRA); Carolina Solberg Salgado (BRA)	Sara Hughes (USA); Summer Ross (USA); 17–21, 21–13, 15–11	Kinga Kołosińska (POL); Katarzyna Kociołek (POL)
Anapa Open; Anapa, Russia; US$10,000; 5–8 July 2018	Nadezda Makroguzova (RUS); Svetlana Kholomina (RUS); 21–13, 21–15	Daria Mastikova (RUS); Anastasia Petrunina (RUS)	Ekaterina Birlova (RUS); Evgenia Ukolova (RUS); 21–19, 21–17	Ksenia Dabizha (RUS); Yulia Abalakina (RUS)
Porec Open; Poreč, Croatia; US$10,000; 5–8 July 2018	Emily Sonny (USA); Torrey Van Winden (USA); 21–17, 21–17	Inna Makhno (UKR); Iryna Makhno (UKR)	Merve Nezir (TUR); Aleyna Vence (TUR); 22–20, 21–23, 15–13	Konstantina Tsopoulou (GRE); Dimitra Manavi (GRE)
Gstaad Major; Gstaad, Switzerland; US$300,000; 10–15 July 2018	Melissa Humana-Paredes (CAN); Sarah Pavan (CAN); 21–17, 12–21, 17–15	Chantal Laboureur (GER); Julia Sude (GER)	Heather Bansley (CAN); Brandie Wilkerson (CAN); 21–19, 21–13	Ágatha Bednarczuk (BRA); Eduarda Lisboa (BRA)
Daegu Open; Daegu, South Korea; US$10,000; 12–15 July 2018	Phoebe Bell (AUS); Jessyka Ngauamo (AUS); 21–14, 21–15	Anja Dörfler (AUT); Stephanie Wiesmeyr (AUT)	Kou Nai-han (TPE); Liu Pi-hsin (TPE); 21–8, 21–14	Noy Chorin (ISR); Anita Deev (ISR)
Haiyang Open; Haiyang, China; US$75,000; 18–22 July 2018	Betsi Flint (USA); Emily Day (USA); 21–16, 21–18	Sarah Schneider (GER); Cinja Tillmann (GER)	Caitlin Ledoux (USA); Sarah Sponcil (USA); 21–18, 21–13	Emily Stockman (USA); Kelley Larsen (USA)
Ulsan Jinha Open; Ulsan, South Korea; US$10,000; 19–22 July 2018	Kou Nai-han (TPE); Liu Pi-hsin (TPE); 21–12, 21–19	Yukako Suzuki (JPN); Kaho Sakaguchi (JPN)	Shinako Tanaka (JPN); Sakurako Fujii (JPN); 15–21, 21–19, 15–12	Miyuki Matsumura (JPN); Samaa Miyagawa (JPN)
3Star in Tokyo; Tokyo, Japan; US$75,000; 25–29 July 2018	Teresa Mersmann (GER); Cinja Tillmann (GER); 22–20, 21–17	Taru Lahti (FIN); Anniina Parkkinen (FIN)	Megumi Murakami (JPN); Miki Ishii (JPN); 21–18, 21–17	Ingrid Lunde (NOR); Oda Ulveseth (NOR)
Agadir Open; Agadir, Morocco; US$50,000; 26–29 July 2018	Marta Menegatti (ITA); Viktoria Orsi Toth (ITA); 19–21, 21–19, 15–12	Martina Bonnerová (CZE); Šárka Nakládalová (CZE)	Alise Lece (LAT); Ilze Liepiņlauska (LAT); 21–17, 21–14	Alice Gradini (ITA); Claudia Scampoli (ITA)
Samsun Open; Samsun, Turkey; US$10,000; 26–29 July 2018	Carolina Ferraris (ITA); Francesca Michieletto (ITA); 21–19, 19–21, 15–11	Eva Freiberger (AUT); Valerie Teufl (AUT)	Camilla Nilsson (SWE); Sofia Ögren (SWE); 15–21, 21–12, 15–10	Nicole Dostálová (CZE); Anna Komárková (CZE)
Vienna Major; Vienna, Austria; US$300,000; 31 July–4 August 2018	Barbora Hermannová (CZE); Markéta Sluková (CZE); 10–21, 21–16, 15–12	Bárbara Seixas (BRA); Fernanda Alves (BRA)	Sanne Keizer (NED); Madelein Meppelink (NED); 21–19, 21–18	Maria Antonelli (BRA); Carolina Solberg Salgado (BRA)
Ljubljana Open; Ljubljana, Slovenia; US$10,000; 3–5 August 2018	Esmée Böbner (SUI); Zoé Vergé-Dépré (SUI); 21–16, 21–17	Inna Makhno (UKR); Iryna Makhno (UKR)	Jelena Pešič (SLO); Ana Skarlovnik (SLO); 21–13, 21–19	Agata Ceynowa (POL); Martyna Kłoda (POL)
Vaduz Open; Vaduz, Liechtenstein; US$10,000; 8–11 August 2018	Alexandra Wheeler (USA); Lara Dykstra (USA); 21–13, 21–17	Agata Ceynowa (POL); Martyna Kłoda (POL)	Dimitra Manavi (GRE); Konstantina Tsopoulou (GRE); 21–14, 10–21, 15–13	Esmée Böbner (SUI); Zoé Vergé-Dépré (SUI)
Moscow Open; Moscow, Russia; US$150,000; 8–12 August 2018	Summer Ross (USA); Sara Hughes (USA); 21–19, 12–21, 15–12	Ágatha Bednarczuk (BRA); Eduarda Lisboa (BRA)	Nina Betschart (SUI); Tanja Hüberli (SUI); 21–19, 21–12	Chantal Laboureur (GER); Julia Sude (GER)
FIVB World Tour Finals; Hamburg, Germany; US$400,000; 14–19 August 2018	Ágatha Bednarczuk (BRA); Eduarda Lisboa (BRA); 21–15, 21–19	Barbora Hermannová (CZE); Markéta Sluková (CZE)	Mariafe Artacho (AUS); Taliqua Clancy (AUS); 21–15, 19–21, 15–8	Maria Elisa Antonelli (BRA); Carolina Solberg Salgado (BRA)

== Medal table by country ==
Rank	Nation	Gold	Silver	Bronze	Total
1	United States (USA)	12	3	9	24
2	Brazil (BRA)	9	13	4	26
3	Russia (RUS)	9	6	6	21
4	Germany (GER)	6	5	5	16
5	Japan (JPN)	6	4	6	16
6	Australia (AUS)	5	1	5	11
7	Austria (AUT)	4	7	1	12
8	Netherlands (NED)	4	3	5	12
9	Canada (CAN)	4	1	2	7
10	Czech Republic (CZE)	3	5	1	9
11	Italy (ITA)	3	2	3	8
12	Latvia (LAT)	3	1	4	8
13	Norway (NOR)	3	1	2	6
14	Poland (POL)	2	6	2	10
15	China (CHN)	2	4	3	9
16	Spain (ESP)	1	3	2	6
17	Switzerland (SUI)	1	2	5	8
18	Ukraine (UKR)	1	2	2	5
19	Serbia (SRB)	1	2	0	3
20	Chinese Taipei (TPE)	1	1	1	3
20	Slovenia (SLO)	1	1	1	3
22	Cuba (CUB)	1	0	2	3
22	Thailand (THA)	1	0	2	3
24	Chile (CHI)	1	0	0	1
24	Romania (ROU)	1	0	0	1
26	Turkey (TUR)	0	2	3	5
27	Iran (IRI)	0	2	1	3
28	France (FRA)	0	1	1	2
28	Indonesia (INA)	0	1	1	2
30	Belgium (BEL)	0	1	0	1
30	Denmark (DEN)	0	1	0	1
30	Estonia (EST)	0	1	0	1
30	Finland (FIN)	0	1	0	1
30	Kazakhstan (KAZ)	0	1	0	1
30	Mexico (MEX)	0	1	0	1
36	Qatar (QAT)	0	0	2	2
36	Sweden (SWE)	0	0	2	2
38	Argentina (ARG)	0	0	1	1
38	Greece (GRE)	0	0	1	1
38	Paraguay (PAR)	0	0	1	1
38	Slovakia (SVK)	0	0	1	1
Totals (41 entries)		85	85	87	257
