= Peppino Vallone =

Italian politician (born 1949)

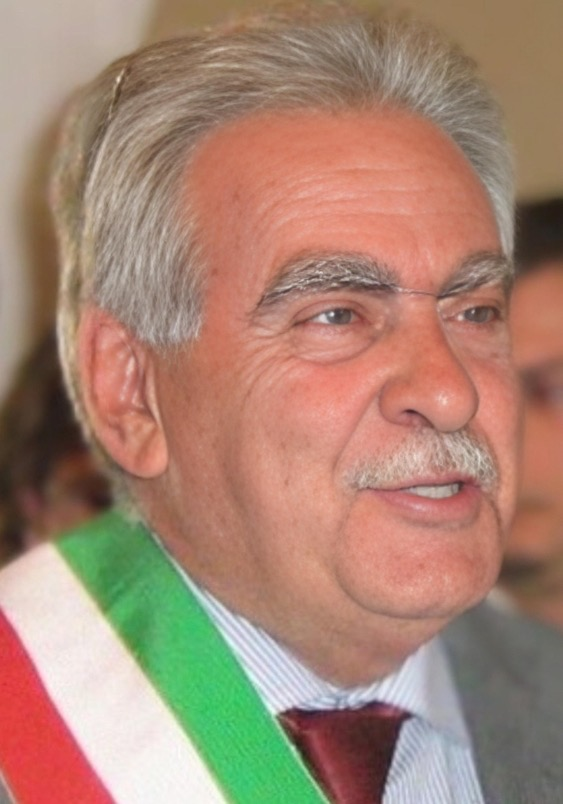

President of the Province of Crotone
- In office 13 October 2014 – 12 January 2017
- Preceded by: Stanislao Zurlo
- Succeeded by: Nicodemo Parrilla

Mayor of Crotone
- In office 13 June 2006 – 25 June 2016
- Preceded by: Pasquale Senatore
- Succeeded by: Ugo Pugliese

Personal details
- Born: 9 January 1949 (age 77) Petilia Policastro, Calabria, Italy
- Party: Christian Democracy (1981-1994); The Daisy (2002-2007); Democratic Party (since 2007)
- Education: University of Modena
- Profession: lawyer

Peppino Vallone (born 9 January 1949) is an Italian politician.

He was elected mayor of Crotone leading a centre-left coalition at the 2006 Italian local elections, and took office on 13 June 2006. He ran for a second term at the 2011 local elections and was re-confirmed on 1 June 2011.

Vallone also served as president of the Province of Crotone from October 2014 to January 2017.

== Biography ==
On September 15, 2012, he was appointed head of the Calabrian PD Mayors’ Council. On November 12 of that same year, he was elected president of ANCI Calabria, succeeding Salvatore Perugini.

In 2014, he ran for president of the Province of Crotone in the October 12 election, challenging the mayor of Cirò Marina, Roberto Siciliani; he was subsequently elected and served until 2017, when Nicodemo Parrilla was elected as his successor.

== See also ==
- 2006 Italian local elections
- 2011 Italian local elections
- List of mayors of Crotone

Political offices
Preceded by Pasquale Senatore	Mayor of Crotone; 2006–2016	Succeeded by Ugo Pugliese
Preceded by Stanislao Zurlo	President of the Province of Crotone; 2014–2017	Succeeded by Nicodemo Parrilla
