= Oleksii Denin =

Ukrainian beach volleyball player

Personal information
- Nationality: Ukrainian
- Born: 2 March 1992 (age 34) Chernihiv, Ukraine
- Height: 2.00 m (6 ft 7 in)
- Weight: 90 kg (198 lb)

Sport
- Sport: Beach volleyball
Medal record
Men's beach volleyball
Representing Ukraine
FIVB Beach Volleyball World Tour
Bronze medal – third place	2018	Alanya Open

Oleksii Denin (born 2 March 1992 in Chernihiv) is a Ukrainian beach volleyball player.

== Career ==
He began to do beach volleyball in 2014 after finishing his career in classical volleyball in Chernihiv.

In 2014, Oleksii competed with his new partner Denys Denysenko at the World U-19 Beach Volleyball Championships without reaching a play-off stage.

Competing with Sergiy Popov, Oleksii won a gold medal at the EEVZA Beach Volleyball Tour in Riga, Latvia.

He represented Ukraine at the 2015 European Games with Oleh Plotnitskyi without reaching 1/8 round stage.

In 2015, competing with Kostyantyn Medianyk, Oleksii competed at the European Continental Cup.

The following years, the duo Denin/Popov competed at the 2017 FIVB Beach Volleyball World Tour in Alsmer without reaching a bronze medal. The duo also won a bronze medal at the EEVZA Beach Volleyball Tour in Estonia.

In 2018, the duo Denysenko/Denin won a bronze medal at the 2018 FIVB Beach Volleyball World Tour in Alanya.
