= Nicodemo Parrilla =

Italian politician

President of the Province of Crotone
- In office 10 January 2017 – 9 January 2018
- Preceded by: Peppino Vallone
- Succeeded by: Ugo Pugliese

Mayor of Cirò Marina
- In office 22 June 2016 – 9 January 2018
- Preceded by: Roberto Siciliani
- Succeeded by: Sergio Ferrari
- In office 30 May 2006 – 14 May 2011
- Preceded by: Nicodemo Filippelli
- Succeeded by: Roberto Siciliani

Personal details
- Born: 14 September 1959 (age 67) Cirò Marina, Province of Catanzaro, Italy
- Education: Gabriele d'Annunzio University
- Occupation: Physician

Nicodemo Parrilla (born 14 September 1959) is an Italian physician and politician. He served as mayor of Cirò Marina from 2006 to 2011 and again from 2016 to 2018, and as president of the Province of Crotone from 2017 to 2018.

== Life and career ==
Parrilla graduated in medicine from the Gabriele d'Annunzio University in Chieti in 1986 and subsequently practised medicine in his hometown of Cirò Marina.

He was first elected mayor of Cirò Marina in 2006, serving until 2011. He returned to office following the 2016 local elections. On 10 January 2017, he was elected president of the Province of Crotone, succeeding Peppino Vallone.

On 9 January 2018, Parrilla was arrested as part of "Operation Stige", a large anti-'Ndrangheta investigation involving alleged organised crime infiltration in local institutions. He was acquitted on appeal in 2023, and the acquittal was upheld by the Supreme Court of Cassation in 2025.
