= List of presidents of the Province of Crotone =

President of the Province of Crotone
- Presidente della Provincia di Crotone
- Incumbent; Antonio Ammirati since 2 April 2026
- Term length: 4 years
- Inaugural holder: Carmine Talarico
- Formation: 1995

The president of the Province of Crotone is the head of the provincial government in Crotone, Calabria, Italy. The president oversees the administration of the province, coordinates the activities of the municipalities, and represents the province in regional and national matters.

Since April 2026, the office has been held by Antonio Ammirati, a centre-right independent.

== History ==
The Province of Crotone was established in 1992, after being separated from the Province of Catanzaro. In its initial phase, the new province was administered by a government-appointed extraordinary commissioner, pending the organisation of its institutional bodies. Following the 1995 elections, Carmine Talarico took office as the first president of the province, marking the beginning of the province's ordinary democratic administration. In accordance with the reform of local authorities introduced in 1993, the president was directly elected by the citizens for a five-year term and was responsible for appointing and dismissing the members of the Provincial Executive.

Following the 2014 Delrio Law, the president is elected by an assembly composed of the mayors and municipal councillors of the municipalities within the province. The president serves a four-year term and acts as the legal representative of the province, presiding over the Provincial Council and the Provincial Assembly of Mayors.

== List ==
No.	Portrait	Name	Term		Party
No.	Portrait	Name	Start	End	Party
1		Carmine Talarico	8 May 1995	14 June 1999	Democratic Party of the Left; Democrats of the Left
1		Carmine Talarico	14 June 1999	18 June 2004	Democratic Party of the Left; Democrats of the Left
2		Sergio Iritale	18 June 2004	23 June 2009	Democrats of the Left; Democratic Party
3		Stanislao Zurlo	23 June 2009	13 October 2014	The People of Freedom; New Centre-Right; Brothers of Italy
4		Peppino Vallone	13 October 2014	12 January 2017	Democratic Party
5		Nicodemo Parrilla	12 January 2017	10 January 2018	Civic list
–		Armando Foresta (acting)	10 January 2018	19 April 2018	Civic list
6		Ugo Pugliese	19 April 2018	4 December 2019	Union of the Centre
–		Giuseppe Dell'Aquila (acting)	4 December 2019	31 August 2020	Democratic Party
–		Simone Saporito (acting)	31 August 2020	10 May 2021	Civic list
–		Vincenzo Lagani (acting)	10 May 2021	19 December 2021	Civic list
7		Sergio Ferrari	19 December 2021	29 December 2025	Independent (centre-right)
–		Fabio Manica (acting)	29 December 2025	2 April 2026	Independent (centre-right)
8		Antonio Ammirati	2 April 2026	Incumbent	Independent (centre-right)
