= Carmine Talarico =

Italian politician (born 1952)

President of the Province of Crotone
- In office 8 May 1995 – 18 June 2004
- Preceded by: Office established
- Succeeded by: Sergio Iritale

Mayor of Crotone
- In office 5 August 1992 – 25 October 1993
- Preceded by: Giancarlo Sitra
- Succeeded by: Domenico Lucente

Personal details
- Born: 19 March 1953 (age 73) Crotone, Italy
- Party: Democratic Party of the Left; Democrats of the Left; Democratic Party
- Education: University of Salerno
- Profession: Teacher, journalist

Carmine Talarico (born 19 March 1953) is an Italian politician who served as mayor of Crotone from 1992 to 1993 and as the first president of the Province of Crotone from 1995 to 2004.

Talarico was elected mayor of Crotone in 1992 as a member of the Democratic Party of the Left. In 1995, he was elected the first president of the newly established Province of Crotone, supported by the centre-left, receiving 54.8% of the vote. He was re-elected in 1999 and remained in office until 2004.

In 2001, Talarico was arrested in connection with an investigation into alleged irregularities in public contracts concerning the renovation of the former Hotel Bologna in Crotone. In 2011, the Court of Cassation confirmed his conviction and a sentence of four years and three months in prison.
