= Stanislao Zurlo =

Italian politician (born 1963)

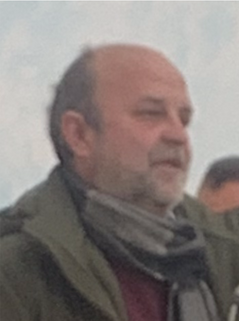

President of the Province of Crotone
- In office 23 June 2009 – 13 October 2014
- Preceded by: Sergio Iritale
- Succeeded by: Peppino Vallone

Personal details
- Born: Stanislao Francesco Zurlo; 2 April 1963 (age 63) Cosenza, Italy
- Party: National Alliance; The People of Freedom; New Centre-Right; Brothers of Italy
- Education: University of Bologna
- Profession: Lawyer, entrepreneur

Stanislao Francesco "Stano" Zurlo (born 2 April 1963) is an Italian lawyer, entrepreneur and politician who served as president of the Province of Crotone from 2009 to 2014.

== Political career ==
Zurlo began his political career with National Alliance and was elected to the Provincial Council of Crotone in 1995. He subsequently served as a city councillor of Crotone from 1997 to 2006. In the 2008 Italian general election, he ran for the Senate on the list of The People of Freedom, but was not elected.

In the 2009 provincial election, Zurlo was the centre-right candidate for president of the Province of Crotone. He received approximately 29.7% of the vote in the first round and won the runoff with approximately 52% of the vote, defeating Ubaldo Schifino.

In the 2014 Calabrian regional election, Zurlo stood for election to the Regional Council of Calabria for Brothers of Italy–National Alliance in the Central constituency. He was not elected.
