= Sergio Iritale =

Italian politician (born 1949)

President of the Province of Crotone
- In office 18 June 2004 – 23 June 2009
- Preceded by: Carmine Talarico
- Succeeded by: Stanislao Zurlo

Personal details
- Born: 3 November 1949 (age 76) Crotone, Italy
- Party: Democratic Party of the Left; Democrats of the Left; Democratic Party; Left Ecology Freedom
- Education: University of Messina

Sergio Iritale (born 3 November 1949) is an Italian politician who served as president of the Province of Crotone from 2004 to 2009.

A member of the Democratic Party of the Left and later the Democrats of the Left, Iritale was elected president of the Province of Crotone in the 2004 provincial election, winning 50.73% of the vote as the centre-left candidate. In the 2009 provincial election, Iritale ran for re-election as an independent and finished third with 20.52% of the vote.

In the 2014 Calabrian regional election, Iritale stood for the Regional Council of Calabria for the Left Ecology Freedom list, receiving 1,172 preference votes and failing to win a seat.
