= Vladyslav Iemelianchyk =

Ukrainian beach volleyball player

Personal information
- Nationality: Ukrainian
- Born: 21 December 1992 (age 33) Zaporizhzhia, Ukraine
- Height: 2.06 m (6 ft 9 in)

Sport
- Sport: Beach volleyball
Medal record
Men's beach volleyball
Representing Ukraine
Volleyball World Beach Pro Tour
Silver medal – second place	2022	Budapest Future
Bronze medal – third place	2022	Leuven Future
FIVB Beach Volleyball World Tour
Gold medal – first place	2018	Porec Open
Gold medal – first place	2019	SMM Pak Bara Beach
Bronze medal – third place	2018	Vaduz Open

Vladyslav Iemelianchyk (born 21 December 1992 in Zaporizhzhia) is a Ukrainian beach volleyball player.

== Career ==
Vladyslav with his partner Iaroslav Gordieiev competed at the 2015 European Games in Baku without reaching a group stage.

In 2017, Denys Denysenko became his new partner and the duo won gold medal at the competition "Khortytsia Open" in Zaporizhzhia.

Competing with Sergiy Popov, he reached a gold medal in Poreč and a bronze medal in Vaduz at the 2018 FIVB Beach Volleyball World Tour.

The following year, Vladyslav with Denys Denysenko won a gold medal in Satun at the 2019 FIVB Beach Volleyball World Tour.

In 2021, Iemelianchyk/Popov represented Ukraine at the 2021 European Beach Volleyball Championships in Vienna without reaching a play-off stage.

The duo (later with Denys Denysenko) also competed at the final qualification to the 2020 Summer Olympics, losing to Belgium in bronze medal match.

In 2022, Vladyslav with Denys Denysenko competed at the 2022 Volleyball World Beach Pro Tour, winning a silver medal in Budapest and a bronze one in Leuven.
