= Jo Sunde =

Norwegian beach volleyball player

Personal information
- Full name: Jo Gladsøy Sunde
- Nationality: Norwegian
- Born: 27 April 2003 (age 23); Molde Municipality, Norway
Honours
Men's beach volleyball
Representing Norway
Volleyball World Beach Pro Tour
Gold medal – first place	2022	Warsaw Future

Jo Gladsøy Sunde (born 27 April 2003) is a Norwegian beach volleyball player. His best result is gold medal in 2022 Volleyball World Beach Pro Tour Warsaw Future together with Markus Mol. He also has a fourth place in Montpellier Future (2022) together with Nils Ringøen. Together with Markus Mol he got silver medal in 2021 European U20 Beach Volleyball Championships.
