= Denys Denysenko =

Ukrainian beach volleyball player

Personal information
- Nationality: Ukrainian
- Born: 15 October 1996 (age 29) Zaporizhzhia, Ukraine
- Height: 1.90 m (6 ft 3 in)
- Weight: 81 kg (179 lb)

Sport
- Sport: Beach volleyball
Medal record
Men's beach volleyball
Representing Ukraine
Volleyball World Beach Pro Tour
Silver medal – second place	2022	Budapest Future
Bronze medal – third place	2022	Leuven Future
FIVB Beach Volleyball World Tour
Gold medal – first place	2019	SMM Pak Bara Beach
Bronze medal – third place	2018	Alanya Open

Denys Denysenko (born 15 October 1996 in Zaporizhzhia) is a Ukrainian beach volleyball player.

== Career ==
In 2014, Denys with his partner Andriy Kravets competed at the 2014 World U-23 Beach Volleyball Championships without reaching a play-off stage. He also competed with his new partner Oleksii Denin at the World U-19 Beach Volleyball Championships without reaching a play-off stage.

In 2016, competing with Oleh Plotnytskyi, Denys represented Ukraine at the 2016 European U-22 Beach Volleyball Championships in Saloniki, reaching 4th place. They lost to French beach volleyball players Gauthier-Rat and Loiseau in bronze medal match.

In 2018, Denys won a bronze medal at the 2018 FIVB Beach Volleyball World Tour in Alanya, competing with Oleksii Denin.

The following year, Denys with Vladyslav Iemelianchyk won a gold medal in Satun at the 2019 FIVB Beach Volleyball World Tour.

In 2022, the duo Denysenko/Iemelianchyk competed at the 2022 Volleyball World Beach Pro Tour, winning a silver medal in Budapest and a bronze one in Leuven.
