= Ugo Pugliese =

Italian politician

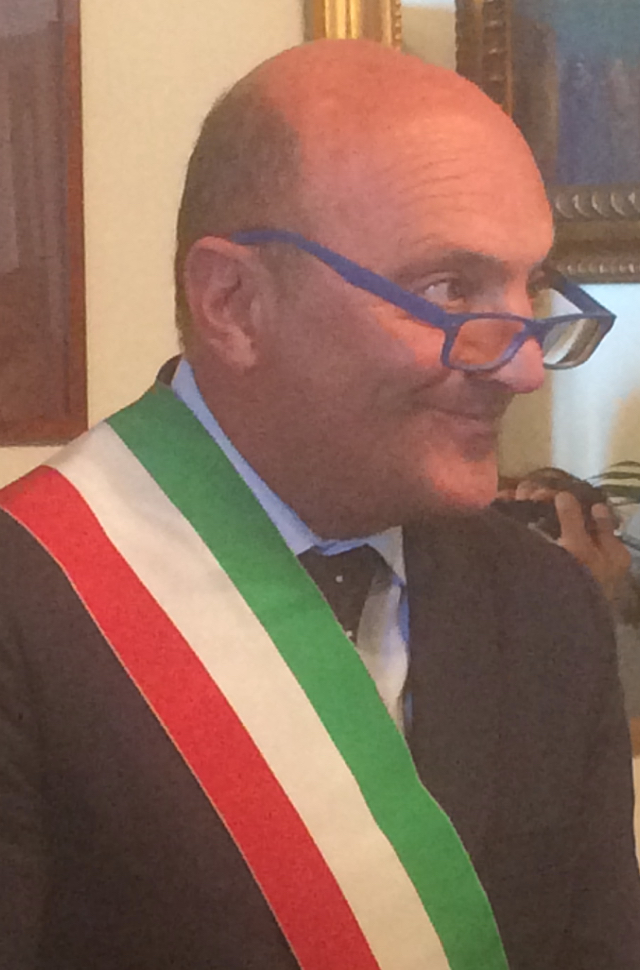

President of the Province of Crotone
- In office 19 April 2018 – 4 December 2019
- Preceded by: Nicodemo Parrilla
- Succeeded by: Sergio Ferrari

Mayor of Crotone
- In office 25 June 2016 – 4 December 2019
- Preceded by: Peppino Vallone
- Succeeded by: Vincenzo Voce

Personal details
- Born: 26 November 1961 (age 64) Crotone, Italy
- Party: Union of the Centre

Ugo Pugliese (born 26 November 1961) is an Italian politician.

He is a member of the centrist party Union of the Centre and was elected mayor of Crotone at the 2016 Italian local elections. He took office on 25 June 2016.

He was elected president of the Province of Crotone on 19 April 2018.

Pugliese resigned on 11 November 2019 and left both offices on 4 December 2019.

== See also ==
- 2016 Italian local elections
- List of mayors of Crotone

Political offices
Preceded by Peppino Vallone	Mayor of Crotone; 2016–2019	Succeeded by Vincenzo Voce
Preceded by Nicodemo Parrilla	President of the Province of Crotone; 2018–2019	Succeeded by Sergio Ferrari
