= Vincenzo Voce =

Italian politician

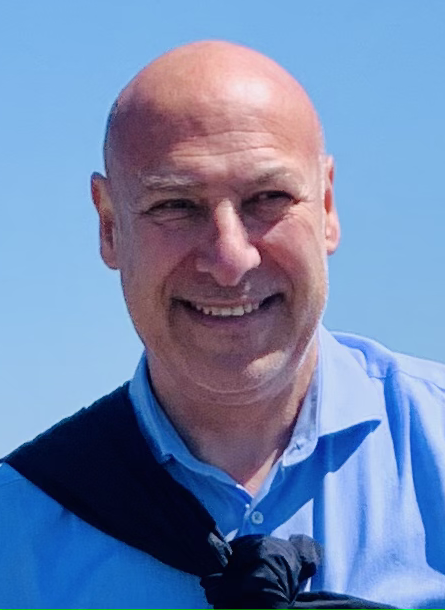

Mayor of Crotone
- Incumbent
- Assumed office 7 October 2020
- Preceded by: Ugo Pugliese

Personal details
- Born: 5 April 1962 (age 64) Crotone, Calabria, Italy
- Party: Centre-right independent
- Education: University of Calabria
- Profession: Engineer

Vincenzo Voce (born 5 April 1962) is an Italian politician.

He ran for mayor of Crotone at the 2020 Italian local elections, supported by the civic list Tesoro Calabria (Treasure Calabria) and other civic parties. He was elected at the second round with 63.95% and took office on 7 October 2020. On 27 March 2021, as a stand against 'intolerance, verbal and physical violence, and racism', Voce gave honorary citizenship of the city to the son of Crotone's Simeon Nwankwo after the Nigerian footballer was subject to cyber racism, including wishes that his son die of pancreatic cancer.

== See also ==
- 2020 Italian local elections
- List of mayors of Crotone

Political offices
Preceded by Ugo Pugliese	Mayor of Crotone since 2020	Incumbent
