= Eduard Reznik =

Ukrainian beach volleyball player

Personal information
- Nationality: Ukrainian
- Born: 14 June 1989 (age 37) Odessa, Ukrainian SSR, Soviet Union
- Height: 2.08 m (6 ft 10 in)
- Weight: 115 kg (254 lb)

Sport
- Sport: Beach volleyball
Medal record
Men's beach volleyball
Representing Ukraine
European Championships
| Bronze medal – third place | 2023 Vienna | Beach |
Volleyball World Beach Pro Tour
| Silver medal – second place | 2022 | Białystok Future |
| Silver medal – second place | 2022 | Lecce Future |
| Silver medal – second place | 2022 | Dubai Challenge 1 |
| Bronze medal – third place | 2022 | Maldives Challenge |

Eduard Reznik (born 14 June 1989) is a Ukrainian beach volleyball player.

== Career ==
In 2013, Eduard competed at the 2013 Confédération Européenne de Volleyball with his partner Iaroslav Gordieiev in team event, but they didn't reach a final. That was his first participance in international competitions.

From 2013 till 2018 he continued to compete at the different international competitions with Gordieiev and Medyanyk. Since 2021, Sergiy Popov became his new partner.

In 2022, Popov and Reznik competed at the Volleyball World Beach Pro Tour, where they won three silver and one bronze medals.

Reznik and Popov competed for Ukraine at the 2023 European Beach Volleyball Championships, held in Vienna, where they won bronze medals. That is the first achievement for Ukrainian national beach volleyball team at these European Championships.

Reznik and Popov competed at the 2023 Beach Volleyball World Championships without reaching round of 16.
