= List of mayors of Crotone =

Mayor of Crotone
- Sindaco di Crotone
- Incumbent; Vincenzo Voce since 7 October 2020
- Appointer: Popular election
- Term length: 5 years, renewable once
- Formation: 1860
- Website: Official website

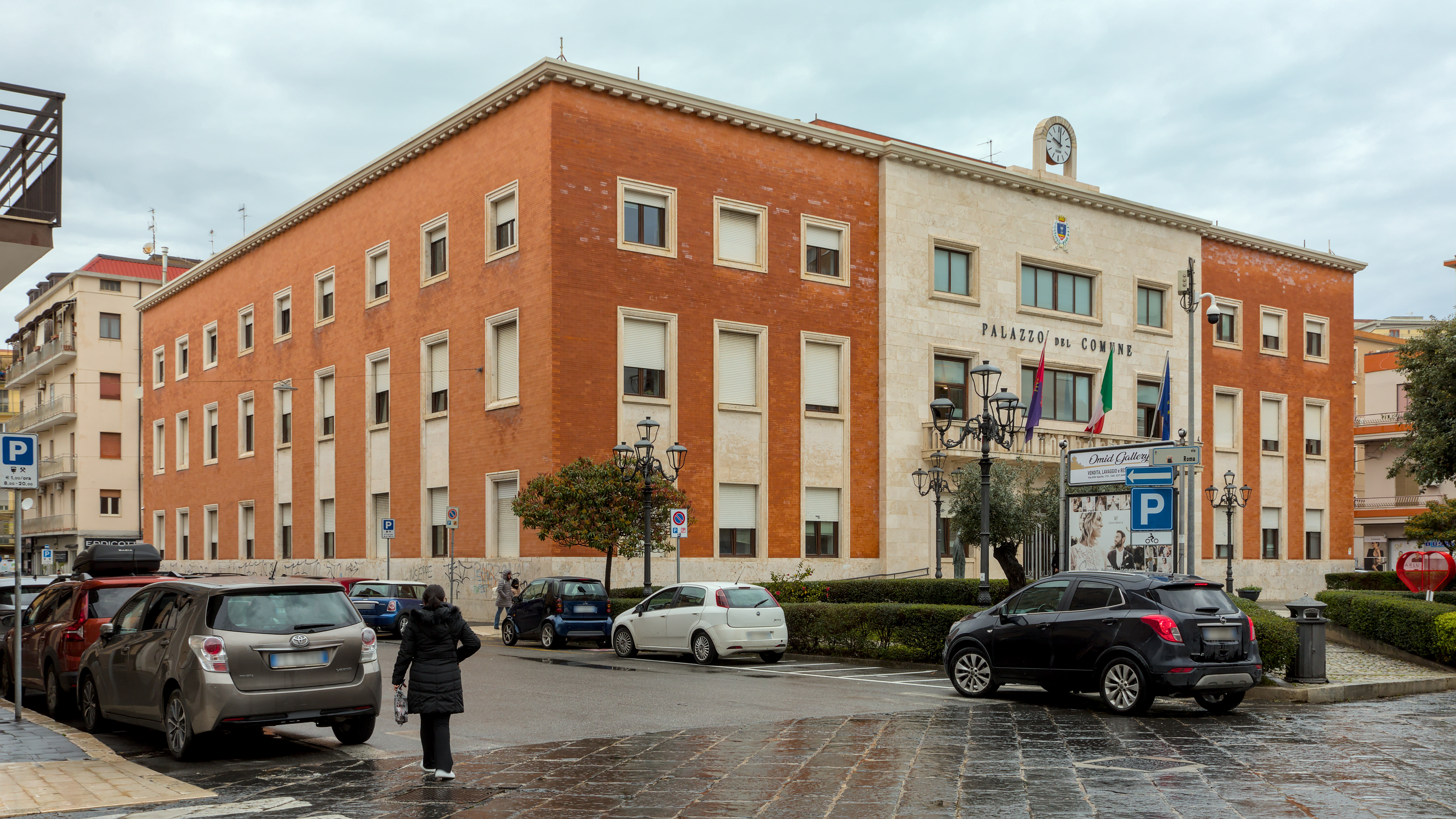
Crotone's Town Hall.

The mayor of Crotone is an elected politician who, along with the Crotone City Council, is accountable for the strategic government of Crotone in Calabria, Italy.

The current mayor is Vincenzo Voce, an independent, who took office on 7 October 2020.

== Overview ==
According to the Italian Constitution, the mayor of Crotone is member of the City Council.

The mayor is elected by the population of Crotone, who also elects the members of the City Council, controlling the mayor's policy guidelines and is able to enforce his resignation by a motion of no confidence. The mayor is entitled to appoint and release the members of his government.

Since 1997 the mayor is elected directly by Crotone's electorate: in all mayoral elections in Italy in cities with a population higher than 15,000 the voters express a direct choice for the mayor or an indirect choice voting for the party of the candidate's coalition. If no candidate receives at least 50% of votes, the top two candidates go to a second round after two weeks. The election of the City Council is based on a direct choice for the candidate with a preference vote: the candidate with the majority of the preferences is elected. The number of the seats for each party is determined proportionally.

== Italian Republic (since 1946) ==
=== City Council election (1946-1997) ===
From 1946 to 1997, the mayor of Crotone was elected by the City Council.

	Mayor	Term start	Term end	Party
1	Silvio Messinetti	1946	1958	PCI
2	Vincenzo Corigliano	1958	1960	PCI
3	Pasqualino Iozzi	1960	1965	PCI
4	Salvatore Regalino	1965	1966	PSI
5	Anselmo Zurlo	1967	1968	Ind
6	Michele Ambrosio	1968	1968	PCI
7	Carlo Napoli	1968	1969	PSI
8	Giorgio Meo	1969	1970	PSI
9	Visconte Frontera	1970	1976	PSI
(7)	Carlo Napoli	1976	1978	PSI
10	Saverio De Santis	1978	1979	PCI
11	Silvio Bernardo	1979	1982	DC
12	Rosario Bevilacqua	1982	1983	DC
(7)	Carlo Napoli	1983	1985	PSI
(9)	Visconte Frontera	1985	1988	PSI
13	Giancarlo Sitra	1990	1991	PCI
Special Prefectural Commissioner tenure (1991–1992)
14	Carmine Talarico	1992	1993	PDS
15	Carmine Lucente	1993	1995	PPI
16	Gaetano Grillo	1995	1997	PPI

=== Direct election (since 1997) ===
Since 1997, under provisions of new local administration law, the mayor of Crotone is chosen by direct election, originally every four, then every five years.

	Mayor	Took office	Left office	Party	Coalition	Election
17	Pasquale Senatore (1940–2015)	12 May 1997	14 May 2001	AN	Pole for Freedoms (FI-AN-CCD-CDU)	1997
17	Pasquale Senatore (1940–2015)	14 May 2001	21 April 2005 (Note: Resigned after being elected regional councillor. The deputy mayor Armando Riganello (AN) held the office till a new municipal election was held.)	AN	House of Freedoms (FI-AN-UDC)	2001
18	Peppino Vallone (b. 1949)	13 June 2006	1 June 2011	DL; PD	The Olive Tree (DS-DL-SDI-PdCI-PRC)	2006
18	Peppino Vallone (b. 1949)	1 June 2011	25 June 2016	DL; PD	PD • IdV • SEL	2011
19	Ugo Pugliese (b. 1961)	25 June 2016	4 December 2019 (Note: Resigned.)	UDC	UDC • Ind	2016
Special Prefectural Commissioner tenure (4 December 2019 – 7 October 2020)
20	Vincenzo Voce (b. 1962)	7 October 2020	4 June 2026	Ind	Ind	2020
20	Vincenzo Voce (b. 1962)	4 June 2026 (Note: Election originally scheduled for October 2025 then postponed to May 2026. According to the Italian law, since 2011 local elections can take place each year only between 15 April and 15 June.)	Incumbent	Ind	FI • FdI	2026
