= Jan Pokeršnik =

Slovenian volleyball player (born 1989)

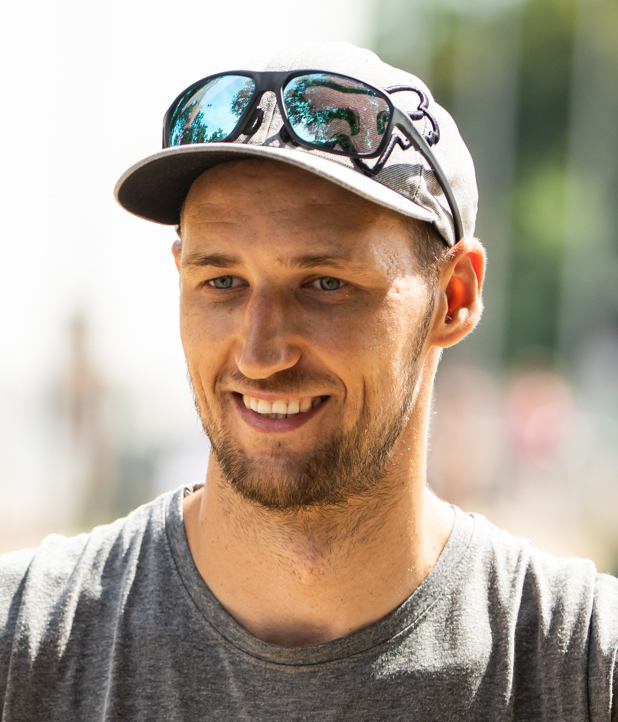
- Pokeršnik in 2022

Personal information
- Nationality: Slovenian
- Born: 15 December 1989 (age 36)

Volleyball information
- Position: right side hitter
- Number: 14 (national team)

Career
Years	Teams
2015	Beauvais Oise UC

National team
2015	Slovenia

Jan Pokeršnik (born 15 December 1989) is a Slovenian male volleyball player. He is part of the Slovenia men's national volleyball team. He competed at the 2015 Men's European Volleyball Championship. At club level he plays for Beauvais Oise UC.

== See also ==
- Slovenia men's national volleyball team
