= Sergiy Popov (beach volleyball) =

Ukrainian beach volleyball player

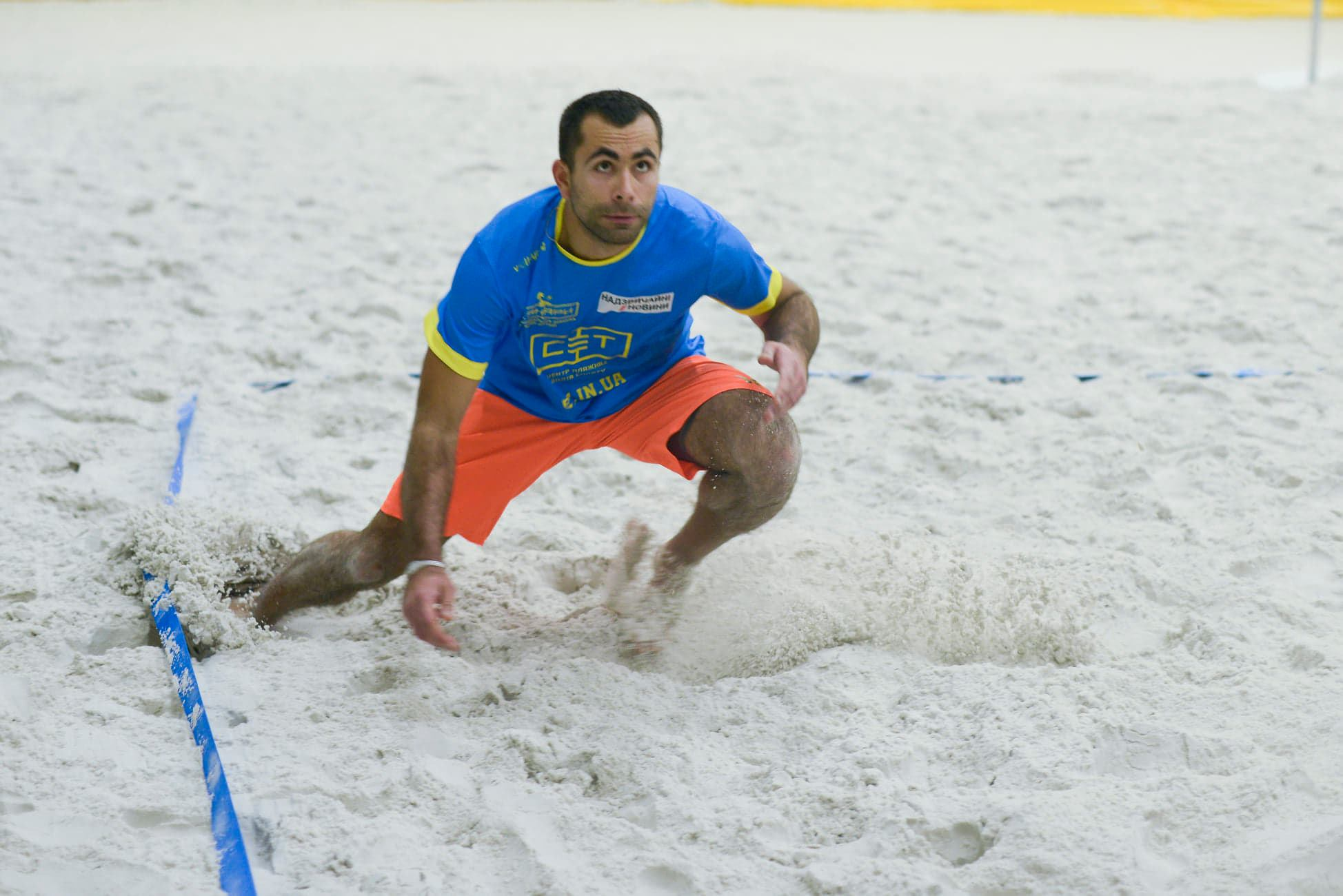

Personal information
- Nationality: Ukrainian
- Born: 6 August 1991 (age 34) Zaporizhzhia, Ukrainian SSR, Soviet Union
- Height: 1.88 m (6 ft 2 in)
- Weight: 80 kg (176 lb)

Sport
- Sport: Beach volleyball
Medal record
Men's beach volleyball
Representing Ukraine
European Championships
| Bronze medal – third place | 2023 Vienna | Beach |
Volleyball World Beach Pro Tour
| Silver medal – second place | 2022 | Białystok Future |
| Silver medal – second place | 2022 | Lecce Future |
| Silver medal – second place | 2022 | Dubai Challenge 1 |
| Bronze medal – third place | 2022 | Maldives Challenge |
FIVB Beach Volleyball World Tour
| Gold medal – first place | 2018 | Porec Open |
| Bronze medal – third place | 2018 | Vaduz Open |
Summer Universiade
| Bronze medal – third place | 2011 Shenzhen | Beach |
World U21 Championships
| Gold medal – first place | 2011 Halifax | Beach |
European U22 Championships
| Gold medal – first place | 2012 Assen | Beach |
World U19 Championships
| Gold medal – first place | 2009 Alanya | Beach |

Sergiy Popov (born 6 August 1991) is a Ukrainian beach volleyball player.

== Career ==
Sergiy competed for Ukraine at the 2009 FIVB Beach Volleyball U19 World Championships, held in Alanya, where he won a gold medal with Valeriy Samoday.

Popov and Samoday won a gold medal at the 2011 FIVB Beach Volleyball U21 World Championships, held in Halifax. They also won bronze medals in men's event at the 2011 Summer Universiade.

In the next year, they represented Ukraine at the 2012 European U22 Beach Volleyball Championships, where Samoday and Popov also won gold medals.

At the next year, Popov/Samoday competed at the 2013 Beach Volleyball World Championships, but they didn't reach a final (17th place). They also competed at the 2013 European Beach Volleyball Championships without reaching a final.

In 2014, Popov and his new partner Illia Kovalov competed at the European Tour in Antalya and World Tour in Anapa without reaching a final.

In the following years, he reached a gold medal in Poreč and a bronze medal in Vaduz at the 2018 FIVB Beach Volleyball World Tour with Vladyslav Iemelianchyk.

Popov with his partner Iaroslav Gordieiev competed at the 2019 FIVB Beach Volleyball World Tour and 2020 FIVB Beach Volleyball World Tour without reaching any medals.

Since 2021, Eduard Reznik is a partner of Sergiy Popov.

In 2022, Popov and Reznik competed at the Volleyball World Beach Pro Tour, where they won three silver and one bronze medals.

Reznik and Popov competed for Ukraine at the 2023 European Beach Volleyball Championships, held in Vienna, where they won bronze medals. That is the first achievement for Ukrainian national beach volleyball team at these European Championships.

Reznik and Popov competed at the 2023 Beach Volleyball World Championships without reaching round of 16.
