= Cirò Marina =

- Comune
- Comune di Cirò Marina
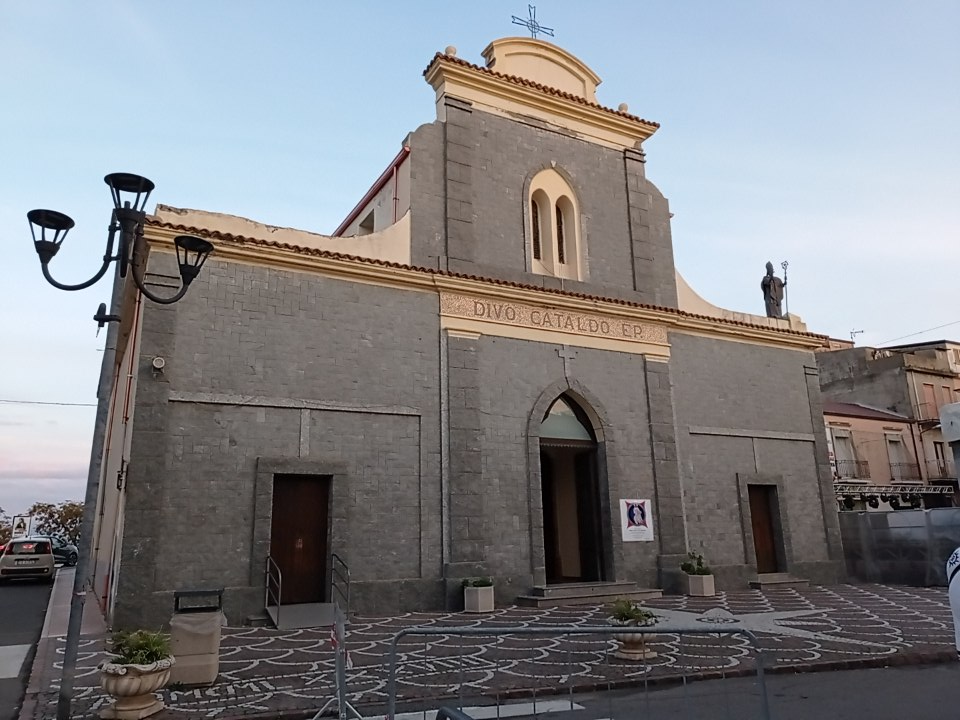
- Church of San Cataldo

- Location within Italy Location within Calabria
- Coordinates: 39°22′10″N 17°07′40″E
- Country: Italy
- Region: Calabria
- Province: Crotone (KR)
- Frazioni: L'Attiva, La Cappella, Santa Venere

Government
  - Mayor: Sergio Ferrari (since 2020)

Area
  - Total: 70 km^{2} (27 sq mi)
- Elevation: 351 m (1,152 ft)

Population (18 May 2024)
  - Total: 14,153
  - Density: 200/km^{2} (520/sq mi)
- Demonym: Ciromarinesi or in dialect Marinoti
- Time zone: UTC+1 (CET)
  - Summer (DST): UTC+2 (CEST)
- Postal code: 88811
- Dialing code: 0962
- Patron saint: San Cataldo
- Saint day: 10 May

Cirò Marina is a comune and town with a population of about 14,000 people in the province of Crotone, in Calabria, Italy.

== History ==
The comune lies on the territory of the previous city of Alichia, which was created during the times of Frederick II, until it was depopulated in the 14th century. Ciro Marina was conquered by the Spanish in the 16th century.

== Economy ==
Ciro Marina relies on the production of oil, wine, cereals, citruses and intense breeding of cattle. The comune's best known wine is Cirò wine.

Ciro Marina's natural resources are the beaches and its historical sites which have yet to be exploited and adds benefits to the town's economy.

== See also ==
- Calabrian wine
