= 2025 FIVB Beach Volleyball U21 World Championships – Women's tournament =

Tournament details
- Host country: Mexico
- City: Puebla
- Dates: 15–20 October
- Teams: (from 5 confederations)

Final positions
- Champions: United States; Sally Perez; Avery Jackson (1st title)
- Runners-up: United States; Zoey Henson; Sarah Wood
- Third place: Brazil; Marcela de Souza Mattoso Barbosa; Maria Clara Costa da Silva
- Fourth place: Hungary; Chiara Honti-Majoros; Stefánia Flóra Kun

The 2025 FIVB Beach Volleyball U21 World Championships – Women's tournament was held from 15 to 20 October 2025.

== Preliminary round ==
=== Pool A ===
Pos	Team	Pld	W	L	Pts	SW	SL	SR	SPW	SPL	SPR	Qualification
1	(Czech Republic) Pavelková K. – Pavelková A.	3	3	0	6	6	0	MAX	126	86	1.465	Round of 16
2	(Mexico) Cruz – Torres	3	2	1	5	4	4	1.000	131	139	0.942	Round of 24
3	(Germany) Maidhof – Neuß	3	1	2	4	3	4	0.750	114	121	0.942	Round of 24
4	(Paraguay) Perez – Valentina	3	0	3	3	1	6	0.167	114	139	0.820	

17 October 2025	Cruz – Torres (Mexico)	2–1	(Germany) Maidhof – Neuß
17 October 2025	(21–13, 10–21, 15–12); Report

17 October 2025	Pavelková K. – Pavelková A. (Czech Republic)	2–0	(Paraguay) Perez – Valentina
17 October 2025	(21–19, 21–11); Report

17 October 2025	Cruz – Torres (Mexico)	2–1	(Paraguay) Perez – Valentina
17 October 2025	(19–21, 21–19, 15–11); Report

17 October 2025	Pavelková K. – Pavelková A. (Czech Republic)	2–0	(Germany) Maidhof – Neuß
17 October 2025	(21–14, 21–12); Report

18 October 2025	Cruz – Torres (Mexico)	0–2	(Czech Republic) Pavelková K. – Pavelková A.
18 October 2025	(17–21, 13–21); Report

18 October 2025	Perez – Valentina (Paraguay)	0–2	(Germany) Maidhof – Neuß
18 October 2025	(14–21, 19–21); Report

=== Pool B ===
Pos	Team	Pld	W	L	Pts	SW	SL	SR	SPW	SPL	SPR	Qualification
1	(United States) Henson – Wood	3	3	0	6	6	1	6.000	131	114	1.149	Round of 16
2	(Latvia) Ēbere – Konstantinova	3	2	1	5	4	2	2.000	121	103	1.175	Round of 24
3	(Brazil) Marcela – Maria Clara	3	1	2	4	3	4	0.750	119	113	1.053	Round of 24
4	(Argentina) Abdala – Sancer	3	0	3	3	0	6	0.000	85	126	0.675	

17 October 2025	Henson – Wood (United States)	2–1	(Brazil) Marcela – Maria Clara
17 October 2025	(21–12, 11–21, 15–13); Report

17 October 2025	Ēbere – Konstantinova (Latvia)	2–0	(Argentina) Abdala – Sancer
17 October 2025	(21–17, 21–13); Report

17 October 2025	Henson – Wood (United States)	2–0	(Argentina) Abdala – Sancer
17 October 2025	(21–15, 21–17); Report

17 October 2025	Ēbere – Konstantinova (Latvia)	2–0	(Brazil) Marcela – Maria Clara
17 October 2025	(21–11, 22–20); Report

18 October 2025	Henson – Wood (United States)	2–0	(Latvia) Ēbere – Konstantinova
18 October 2025	(21–17, 21–19); Report

18 October 2025	Abdala – Sancer (Argentina)	0–2	(Brazil) Marcela – Maria Clara
18 October 2025	(15–21, 8–21); Report

=== Pool C ===
Pos	Team	Pld	W	L	Pts	SW	SL	SR	SPW	SPL	SPR	Qualification
1	(United States) Perez – Jackson	3	3	0	6	6	2	3.000	148	99	1.495	Round of 16
2	(Poland) Okla – Radelczuk	3	2	1	5	5	2	2.500	125	100	1.250	Round of 24
3	(Spain) Izuzquiza – Serrano F	3	1	2	4	3	4	0.750	120	113	1.062	Round of 24
4	(Morocco) Imane – Fatimazahra	3	0	3	3	0	6	0.000	45	126	0.357	

16 October 2025	Izuzquiza – Serrano F (Spain)	1–2	(United States) Perez – Jackson
16 October 2025	(21–18, 11–21, 13–15); Report

16 October 2025	Imane – Fatimazahra (Morocco)	0–2	(Poland) Okla – Radelczuk
16 October 2025	(7–21, 8–21); Report

17 October 2025	Izuzquiza – Serrano F (Spain)	0–2	(Poland) Okla – Radelczuk
17 October 2025	(19–21, 14–21); Report

17 October 2025	Imane – Fatimazahra (Morocco)	0–2	(United States) Perez – Jackson
17 October 2025	(5–21, 8–21); Report

18 October 2025	Izuzquiza – Serrano F (Spain)	2–0	(Morocco) Imane – Fatimazahra
18 October 2025	(21–10, 21–7); Report

18 October 2025	Okla – Radelczuk (Poland)	1–2	(United States) Perez – Jackson
18 October 2025	(21–16, 14–21, 6–15); Report

=== Pool D ===
Pos	Team	Pld	W	L	Pts	SW	SL	SR	SPW	SPL	SPR	Qualification
1	(Hungary) Honti-Majoros – Kun	3	3	0	6	6	1	6.000	142	97	1.464	Round of 16
2	(Thailand) R.Suchipha – S.Samitta	3	2	1	5	5	3	1.667	148	142	1.042	Round of 24
3	(Costa Rica) Aguilar – Molina	3	1	2	4	2	4	0.500	96	118	0.814	Round of 24
4	(Venezuela) Ramirez – Valeria	3	0	3	3	1	6	0.167	108	137	0.788	

16 October 2025	R.Suchipha – S.Samitta (Thailand)	1–2	(Hungary) Honti-Majoros – Kun
16 October 2025	(21–18, 15–21, 17–19); Report

16 October 2025	Aguilar – Molina (Costa Rica)	2–0	(Venezuela) Ramirez – Valeria
16 October 2025	(21–15, 21–19); Report

17 October 2025	R.Suchipha – S.Samitta (Thailand)	2–1	(Venezuela) Ramirez – Valeria
17 October 2025	(17–21, 21–19, 15–12); Report

17 October 2025	Aguilar – Molina (Costa Rica)	0–2	(Hungary) Honti-Majoros – Kun
17 October 2025	(11–21, 11–21); Report

18 October 2025	R.Suchipha – S.Samitta (Thailand)	2–0	(Costa Rica) Aguilar – Molina
18 October 2025	(21–18, 21–14); Report

18 October 2025	Ramirez – Valeria (Venezuela)	0–2	(Hungary) Honti-Majoros – Kun
18 October 2025	(10–21, 12–21); Report

=== Pool E ===
Pos	Team	Pld	W	L	Pts	SW	SL	SR	SPW	SPL	SPR	Qualification
1	(Canada) Sorra – Odigie	3	3	0	6	6	1	6.000	138	128	1.078	Round of 16
2	(France) Duval – Sobezalz	3	2	1	5	5	3	1.667	150	116	1.293	Round of 24
3	(Germany) Dreßen – Jancar	3	1	2	4	3	4	0.750	130	134	0.970	Round of 24
4	(Guatemala) Monney – Aguilar	3	0	3	3	0	6	0.000	86	126	0.683	

16 October 2025	Duval – Sobezalz (France)	2–1	(Germany) Dreßen – Jancar
16 October 2025	(19–21, 21–15, 15–9); Report

16 October 2025	Sorra – Odigie (Canada)	2–0	(Guatemala) Monney – Aguilar
16 October 2025	(21–14, 21–18); Report

17 October 2025	Duval – Sobezalz (France)	2–0	(Guatemala) Monney – Aguilar
17 October 2025	(21–11, 21–11); Report

17 October 2025	Sorra – Odigie (Canada)	2–0	(Germany) Dreßen – Jancar
17 October 2025	(23–21, 24–22); Report

18 October 2025	Duval – Sobezalz (France)	1–2	(Canada) Sorra – Odigie
18 October 2025	(21–13, 19–21, 13–15); Report

18 October 2025	Monney – Aguilar (Guatemala)	0–2	(Germany) Dreßen – Jancar
18 October 2025	(15–21, 17–21); Report

=== Pool F ===
Pos	Team	Pld	W	L	Pts	SW	SL	SR	SPW	SPL	SPR	Qualification
1	(Netherlands) Hogenhout – Konink	3	3	0	6	6	0	MAX	126	57	2.211	Round of 16
2	(Australia) Rayner – Du Plessis	3	2	1	5	4	2	2.000	111	85	1.306	Round of 24
3	(Kyrgyzstan) Rasulbek Kyzy – Aitbekova	3	1	2	4	2	5	0.400	92	131	0.702	Round of 24
4	(Egypt) M.Mariam – Rawan	3	0	3	3	1	6	0.167	83	139	0.597	

16 October 2025	Rayner – Du Plessis (Australia)	2–0	(Kyrgyzstan) Rasulbek Kyzy – Aitbekova
16 October 2025	(21–14, 21–8); Report

16 October 2025	Hogenhout – Konink (Netherlands)	2–0	(Egypt) M.Mariam – Rawan
16 October 2025	(21–6, 21–9); Report

17 October 2025	Rayner – Du Plessis (Australia)	2–0	(Egypt) M.Mariam – Rawan
17 October 2025	(21–10, 21–11); Report

17 October 2025	Hogenhout – Konink (Netherlands)	2–0	(Kyrgyzstan) Rasulbek Kyzy – Aitbekova
17 October 2025	(21–9, 21–6); Report

18 October 2025	Rayner – Du Plessis (Australia)	0–2	(Netherlands) Hogenhout – Konink
18 October 2025	(16–21, 11–21); Report

18 October 2025	M.Mariam – Rawan (Egypt)	1–2	(Kyrgyzstan) Rasulbek Kyzy – Aitbekova
18 October 2025	(16–21, 21–19, 10–15); Report

=== Pool G ===
Pos	Team	Pld	W	L	Pts	SW	SL	SR	SPW	SPL	SPR	Qualification
1	(Brazil) Carol – Julhia	3	3	0	6	6	1	6.000	143	110	1.300	Round of 16
2	(Switzerland) Bossart – Leona	3	2	1	5	5	2	2.500	141	106	1.330	Round of 24
3	(New Zealand) Stevenson – Hinton	3	1	2	4	2	4	0.500	103	107	0.963	Round of 24
4	(Mozambique) Nadia – Verónica	3	0	3	3	0	6	0.000	62	126	0.492	

16 October 2025	Bossart – Leona (Switzerland)	2–0	(New Zealand) Stevenson – Hinton
16 October 2025	(21–17, 21–13); Report

16 October 2025	Carol – Julhia (Brazil)	2–0	(Mozambique) Nadia – Verónica
16 October 2025	(21–13, 21–9); Report

17 October 2025	Bossart – Leona (Switzerland)	2–0	(Mozambique) Nadia – Verónica
17 October 2025	(21–9, 21–8); Report

17 October 2025	Carol – Julhia (Brazil)	2–0	(New Zealand) Stevenson – Hinton
17 October 2025	(21–18, 21–13); Report

18 October 2025	Bossart – Leona (Switzerland)	1–2	(Brazil) Carol – Julhia
18 October 2025	(19–21, 21–19, 17–19); Report

18 October 2025	Nadia – Verónica (Mozambique)	0–2	(New Zealand) Stevenson – Hinton
18 October 2025	(12–21, 11–21); Report

=== Pool H ===
Pos	Team	Pld	W	L	Pts	SW	SL	SR	SPW	SPL	SPR	Qualification
1	(Austria) Berger – Hohenauer L.	3	3	0	6	6	0	MAX	126	69	1.826	Round of 16
2	(Japan) Mori – Utsugi	3	2	1	5	4	3	1.333	120	120	1.000	Round of 24
3	(Peru) Yezet – Castillo	3	1	2	4	3	4	0.750	111	121	0.917	Round of 24
4	(Puerto Rico) Alvarado – Maisonet	3	0	3	3	0	6	0.000	79	126	0.627	

16 October 2025	Berger – Hohenauer L. (Austria)	2–0	(Puerto Rico) Alvarado – Maisonet
16 October 2025	(21–7, 21–16); Report

16 October 2025	Mori – Utsugi (Japan)	2–1	(Peru) Yezet – Castillo
16 October 2025	(17–21, 21–15, 15–12); Report

17 October 2025	Berger – Hohenauer L. (Austria)	2–0	(Peru) Yezet – Castillo
17 October 2025	(21–11, 21–10); Report

17 October 2025	Mori – Utsugi (Japan)	2–0	(Puerto Rico) Alvarado – Maisonet
17 October 2025	(21–13, 21–17); Report

18 October 2025	Berger – Hohenauer L. (Austria)	2–0	(Japan) Mori – Utsugi
18 October 2025	(21–13, 21–12); Report

18 October 2025	Yezet – Castillo (Peru)	2–0	(Puerto Rico) Alvarado – Maisonet
18 October 2025	(21–9, 21–17); Report

== Knockout stage ==
=== Bracket ===
Round of 16
19 October
(Czech Republic) Pavelková K. – Pavelková A.	0
(Brazil) Marcela – Maria Clara	2
19 October
(Brazil) Carol – Julhia	2
(Peru) Yezet – Castillo	0
19 October
(Netherlands) Hogenhout – Konink	0
(Latvia) Ēbere – Konstantinova	2
19 October
(United States) Perez – Jackson	2
(Mexico) Cruz – Torres	0
19 October
(Hungary) Honti-Majoros – Kun	2
(Spain) Izuzquiza – Serrano F	1
19 October
(Austria) Berger – Hohenauer L.	2
(Poland) Okla – Radelczuk	1
19 October
(Canada) Sorra – Odigie	2
(Switzerland) Bossart – Leona	1
19 October
(United States) Henson – Wood	2
(Germany) Maidhof – Neuß	0

Quarter-finals
19 October
(Brazil) Marcela – Maria Clara	2
(Brazil) Carol – Julhia	1
19 October
(Latvia) Ēbere – Konstantinova	1
(United States) Perez – Jackson	2
19 October
(Hungary) Honti-Majoros – Kun	2
(Austria) Berger – Hohenauer L.	0
19 October
(Canada) Sorra – Odigie	0
(United States) Henson – Wood	2

Semi-finals
20 October
(Brazil) Marcela – Maria Clara	0
(United States) Perez – Jackson	2
19 October
(Hungary) Honti-Majoros – Kun	1
(United States) Henson – Wood	2

Final
20 October
(United States) Perez – Jackson	2
(United States) Henson – Wood	0
Third place
20 October
(Brazil) Marcela – Maria Clara	2
(Hungary) Honti-Majoros – Kun	1

=== Round of 24 ===
18 October 2025	Mori – Utsugi (Japan)	0–2	(Spain) Izuzquiza – Serrano F
18 October 2025	(13–21, 15–21); Report

18 October 2025	Okla – Radelczuk (Poland)	2–0	(Kyrgyzstan) Rasulbek Kyzy – Aitbekova
18 October 2025	(21–12, 21–9); Report

18 October 2025	Bossart – Leona (Switzerland)	2–0	(Costa Rica) Aguilar – Molina
18 October 2025	(21–12, 21–7); Report

18 October 2025	R.Suchipha – S.Samitta (Thailand)	0–2	(Germany) Maidhof – Neuß
18 October 2025	(16–21, 15–21); Report

19 October 2025	Duval – Sobezalz (France)	0–2	(Brazil) Marcela – Maria Clara
19 October 2025	(19–21, 21–23); Report

19 October 2025	Rayner – Du Plessis (Australia)	1–2	(Peru) Yezet – Castillo
19 October 2025	(17–21, 25–23, 12–15); Report

19 October 2025	Ēbere – Konstantinova (Latvia)	2–1	(New Zealand) Stevenson – Hinton
19 October 2025	(15–21, 23–21, 15–5); Report

19 October 2025	Cruz – Torres (Mexico)	2–1	(Germany) Dreßen – Jancar
19 October 2025	(21–13, 19–21, 15–10); Report

=== Round of 16 ===
19 October 2025	Honti-Majoros – Kun (Hungary)	2–1	(Spain) Izuzquiza – Serrano F
19 October 2025	(15–21, 22–20, 18–16); Report

19 October 2025	Berger – Hohenauer L. (Austria)	2–1	(Poland) Okla – Radelczuk
19 October 2025	(24–26, 24–22, 15–11); Report

19 October 2025	Sorra – Odigie (Canada)	2–1	(Switzerland) Bossart – Leona
19 October 2025	(14–21, 21–19, 15–12); Report

19 October 2025	Henson – Wood (United States)	2–0	(Germany) Maidhof – Neuß
19 October 2025	(21–16, 26–24); Report

19 October 2025	Pavelková K. – Pavelková A. (Czech Republic)	0–2	(Brazil) Marcela – Maria Clara
19 October 2025	(19–21, 18–21); Report

19 October 2025	Carol – Julhia (Brazil)	2–0	(Peru) Yezet – Castillo
19 October 2025	(21–14, 21–15); Report

19 October 2025	Hogenhout – Konink (Netherlands)	0–2	(Latvia) Ēbere – Konstantinova
19 October 2025	(19–21, 15–21); Report

19 October 2025	Perez – Jackson (United States)	2–0	(Mexico) Cruz – Torres
19 October 2025	(21–17, 21–10); Report

=== Quarterfinals ===
19 October 2025	Marcela – Maria Clara (Brazil)	2–1	(Brazil) Carol – Julhia
19 October 2025	(21–19, 8–21, 15–11); Report

19 October 2025	Honti-Majoros – Kun (Hungary)	2–0	(Austria) Berger – Hohenauer L.
19 October 2025	(24–22, 21–17); Report

19 October 2025	Sorra – Odigie (Canada)	0–2	(United States) Henson – Wood
19 October 2025	(16–21, 15–21); Report

19 October 2025	Ēbere – Konstantinova (Latvia)	1–2	(United States) Perez – Jackson
19 October 2025	(21–18, 21–23, 12–15); Report

=== Semifinals ===
19 October 2025	Honti-Majoros – Kun (Hungary)	1–2	(United States) Henson – Wood
19 October 2025	(13–21, 21–18, 12–15); Report

20 October 2025	Marcela – Maria Clara (Brazil)	0–2	(United States) Perez – Jackson
20 October 2025	(15–21, 8–21); Report

=== Third place game ===
20 October 2025	Marcela – Maria Clara (Brazil)	2–1	(Hungary) Honti-Majoros – Kun
20 October 2025	(25–23, 14–21, 15–13); Report

=== Final ===
20 October 2025	Perez – Jackson (United States)	2–0	(United States) Henson – Wood
20 October 2025	(25–23, 21–15); Report

== Final ranking ==
Rank	Team
Gold medal	(United States) Perez – Jackson
Silver medal	(United States) Henson – Wood
Bronze medal	(Brazil) Marcela – Maria Clara
4	(Hungary) Honti-Majoros – Kun
5	(Austria) Berger – Hohenauer L.
5	(Brazil) Carol – Julhia
5	(Canada) Sorra – Odigie
5	(Latvia) Ēbere – Konstantinova
9	(Czech Republic) Pavelková K. – Pavelková A.
9	(Spain) Izuzquiza – Serrano F
9	(Germany) Maidhof – Neuß
9	(Mexico) Cruz – Torres
9	(Netherlands) Hogenhout – Konink
9	(Peru) Yezet – Castillo
9	(Poland) Okla – Radelczuk
9	(Switzerland) Bossart – Leona
17	(Australia) Rayner – Du Plessis
17	(Costa Rica) Aguilar – Molina
17	(France) Duval – Sobezalz
17	(Germany) Dreßen – Jancar
17	(Japan) Mori – Utsugi
17	(Kyrgyzstan) Rasulbek Kyzy – Aitbekova
17	(New Zealand) Stevenson – Hinton
17	(Thailand) R.Suchipha – S.Samitta
25	(Argentina) Abdala – Sancer
25	(Egypt) M.Mariam – Rawan
25	(Guatemala) Monney – Aguilar
25	(Morocco) Imane – Fatimazahra
25	(Mozambique) Nadia – Verónica
25	(Paraguay) Perez – Valentina
25	(Puerto Rico) Alvarado – Maisonet
25	(Venezuela) Ramirez – Valeria
33	(Czech Republic) Knoblochova – Petrikova
33	(Latvia) Šauberga – Puškundze
33	(Mexico) Bucio – Silva
36	(Australia) Alchin – Burnell
36	(Canada) Hancock – Cudmore
36	(Finland) Henriksson – Hirvonen
36	(Japan) Morikawa – Yada
36	(Ukraine) Kurnikova – Nikitchuk
