= France at the 2024 Summer Olympics =

- IOC code: FRA
- NOC: French National Olympic and Sports Committee
- Website: www.franceolympique.com (in French)

in Paris, France 26 July 2024 – 11 August 2024
- Competitors: 573 (291 men and 282 women) in 35 sports
- Flag bearers (opening): Florent Manaudou & Mélina Robert-Michon
- Flag bearers (closing): Antoine Dupont & Pauline Ferrand-Prévot
- Medals Ranked 5th: Gold 16 Silver 26 Bronze 22 Total 64

Summer Olympics appearances (overview)
- 1896; 1900; ~~1904~~; 1908; 1912; 1920; 1924; 1928; 1932; 1936; 1948; 1952; 1956; 1960; 1964; 1968; 1972; 1976; 1980; 1984; 1988; 1992; 1996; 2000; 2004; 2008; 2012; 2016; 2020; 2024; 2028

Other related appearances
- 1906 Intercalated Games

France was the host nation of the 2024 Summer Olympics in Paris from 26 July to 11 August 2024. France is one of five countries to have appeared in every Summer Olympic Games of the modern era, alongside Australia, Great Britain, Greece, and Switzerland. There were 573 athletes that competed at this edition, becoming the nation's largest delegation since the 1900 Olympics, which were also held in Paris. They won 64 medals, including 16 gold medals. As a result, France finished fifth in the medal table, marking their first top-five finish since the 1996 Summer Olympics.

Two days before the opening ceremony, the International Olympic Committee (IOC) announced that the French Alps would host the 2030 Winter Olympics, returning the Winter Olympics to its birthplace after 38 years. The opening ceremony will take place on 1 February 2030.

== Medalists ==
Medal	Name	Sport	Event	Date
Gold	France national rugby sevens team: Jean-Pascal Barraque; Antoine Dupont; Théo Forner; Aaron Grandidier Nkanang; Jefferson Lee Joseph; Stephen Parez; Varian Pasquet; Rayan Rebbadj; Paulin Riva; Jordan Sepho; Andy Timo; Antoine Zeghdar	Rugby sevens	Men's tournament	27 July
Gold	Pauline Ferrand-Prévot	Cycling	Women's cross-country	28 July
Gold	Léon Marchand	Swimming	Men's 400 m individual medley	28 July
Gold	Nicolas Gestin	Canoeing	Men's slalom C-1	29 July
Gold	Manon Brunet	Fencing	Women's sabre	29 July
Gold	Cassandre Beaugrand	Triathlon	Women's triathlon	31 July
Gold	Léon Marchand	Swimming	Men's 200 m butterfly	31 July
Gold	Léon Marchand	Swimming	Men's 200 m breaststroke	31 July
Gold	Teddy Riner	Judo	Men's +100 kg	2 August
Gold	Léon Marchand	Swimming	Men's 200 m individual medley	2 August
Gold	Joris Daudet	Cycling	Men's BMX racing	2 August
Gold	Shirine Boukli; Joan-Benjamin Gaba; Amandine Buchard; Walide Khyar; Sarah-Léonie Cysique; Luka Mkheidze; Clarisse Agbegnenou; Alpha Oumar Djalo; Marie-Ève Gahié; Maxime-Gaël Ngayap Hambou; Romane Dicko; Aurélien Diesse; Madeleine Malonga; Teddy Riner	Judo	Mixed team	3 August
Gold	Kauli Vaast	Surfing	Men's shortboard	5 August
Gold	Benjamin Thomas	Cycling	Men's omnium	8 August
Gold	France men's national volleyball team: Barthélémy Chinenyeze; Jenia Grebennikov; Jean Patry; Benjamin Toniutti; Kévin Tillie; Earvin N'Gapeth; Antoine Brizard; Nicolas Le Goff; Trévor Clévenot; Yacine Louati; Théo Faure; Quentin Jouffroy	Volleyball	Men's tournament	10 August
Gold	Althéa Laurin	Taekwondo	Women's +67 kg	10 August
Silver	Luka Mkheidze	Judo	Men's −60 kg	27 July
Silver	Auriane Mallo	Fencing	Women's épée	27 July
Silver	Yannick Borel	Fencing	Men's épée	28 July
Silver	Karim Laghouag; Stéphane Landois; Nicolas Touzaint	Equestrian	Team eventing	29 July
Silver	Victor Koretzky	Cycling	Men's cross-country	29 July
Silver	Baptiste Addis; Thomas Chirault; Jean-Charles Valladont	Archery	Men's Team	29 July
Silver	Joan-Benjamin Gaba	Judo	Men's 73 kg	29 July
Silver	Sara Balzer	Fencing	Women's sabre	29 July
Silver	Marie-Florence Candassamy; Alexandra Louis-Marie; Auriane Mallo; Coraline Vitalis	Fencing	Women's Team épée	30 July
Silver	Anastasiya Kirpichnikova	Swimming	Women's 1500 m freestyle	31 July
Silver	Titouan Castryck	Canoeing	Men's slalom K-1	1 August
Silver	Sylvain André	Cycling	Men's BMX racing	2 August
Silver	Camille Jedrzejewski	Shooting	Women's 25 m pistol	3 August
Silver	Valentin Madouas	Cycling	Men's individual road race	3 August
Silver	Angèle Hug	Canoeing	Women's KX-1	5 August
Silver	France men's national 3x3 team: Lucas Dussoulier; Timothé Vergiat; Jules Rambaut; Franck Seguela	Basketball	Men's 3x3	5 August
Silver	Sofiane Oumiha	Boxing	Men's 63.5 kg	7 August
Silver	Lauriane Nolot	Sailing	Women's Formula Kite	8 August
Silver	Billal Bennama	Boxing	Men's 51 kg	8 August
Silver	France national under-23 football team: Maghnes Akliouche; Loïc Badé; Rayan Cherki; Joris Chotard; Andy Diouf; Désiré Doué; Arnaud Kalimuendo; Manu Koné; Alexandre Lacazette; Johann Lepenant; Bradley Locko; Castello Lukeba; Soungoutou Magassa; Jean-Philippe Mateta; Chrislain Matsima; Enzo Millot; Obed Nkambadio; Michael Olise; Guillaume Restes; Kiliann Sildillia; Adrien Truffert	Football	Men's tournament	9 August
Silver	France women's national handball team: Laura Glauser; Méline Nocandy; Alicia Toublanc; Chloé Valentini; Coralie Lassource; Grâce Zaadi; Laura Flippes; Cléopatre Darleux; Orlane Kanor; Tamara Horacek; Pauletta Foppa; Estelle Nze Minko; Oriane Ondono; Lucie Granier; Sarah Bouktit; Léna Grandveau; Hatadou Sako	Handball	Women's tournament	10 August
Silver	Cyréna Samba-Mayela	Athletics	Women's 100 m hurdles	10 August
Silver	Danis Civil	Breaking	B-Boys	10 August
Silver	France men's national basketball team: Frank Ntilikina; Nicolas Batum; Andrew Albicy; Guerschon Yabusele; Isaïa Cordinier; Evan Fournier; Nando de Colo; Mathias Lessort; Rudy Gobert; Victor Wembanyama; Matthew Strazel; Bilal Coulibaly	Basketball	Men's tournament	10 August
Silver	Élodie Clouvel	Modern pentathlon	Women's individual	11 August
Silver	France women's national basketball team: Valériane Ayayi; Marième Badiane; Romane Bernies; Alexia Chery; Marine Fauthoux; Marine Johannès; Leïla Lacan; Dominique Malonga; Sarah Michel; Iliana Rupert; Janelle Salaün; Gabby Williams	Basketball	Women's tournament	11 August
Bronze	Shirine Boukli	Judo	Women's 48 kg	27 July
Bronze	Amandine Buchard	Judo	Women's 52 kg	28 July
Bronze	Sarah-Léonie Cysique	Judo	Women's 57 kg	29 July
Bronze	Clarisse Agbegnenou	Judo	Women's 63 kg	30 July
Bronze	Léo Bergère	Triathlon	Men's triathlon	31 July
Bronze	Anthony Jeanjean	Cycling	Men's BMX freestyle	31 July
Bronze	Maxime-Gaël Ngayap Hambou	Judo	Men's 90 kg	31 July
Bronze	Sébastien Patrice; Maxime Pianfetti; Boladé Apithy; Jean-Philippe Patrice	Fencing	Men's Team sabre	31 July
Bronze	Sarah Steyaert; Charline Picon	Sailing	49er FX	2 August
Bronze	Simon Delestre; Olivier Perreau; Julien Epaillard	Equestrian	Team jumping	2 August
Bronze	Romane Dicko	Judo	Women's +78 kg	2 August
Bronze	Florent Manaudou	Swimming	Men's 50 m freestyle	2 August
Bronze	Romain Mahieu	Cycling	Men's BMX racing	2 August
Bronze	Lisa Barbelin	Archery	Women's individual	3 August
Bronze	Christophe Laporte	Cycling	Men's individual road race	3 August
Bronze	Félix Lebrun	Table tennis	Men's singles	4 August
Bronze	Maximilien Chastanet; Maxime Pauty; Enzo Lefort; Julien Mertine	Fencing	Men's team foil	4 August
Bronze	Yohann Ndoye-Brouard; Léon Marchand; Maxime Grousset; Florent Manaudou; Clément Secchi*; Rafael Fente-Damers*	Swimming	Men's 4 × 100 m medley relay	4 August
Bronze	Johanne Defay	Surfing	Women's shortboard	5 August
Bronze	Cyrian Ravet	Taekwondo	Men's 58 kg	7 August
Bronze	Djamili-Dini Aboudou Moindze	Boxing	Men's +92 kg	7 August
Bronze	Simon Gauzy; Alexis Lebrun; Félix Lebrun	Table tennis	Men's team	9 August

Medals by sport
Sport	1st place, gold medalist(s)	2nd place, silver medalist(s)	3rd place, bronze medalist(s)	Total
Swimming	4	1	2	7
Cycling	3	3	3	9
Judo	2	2	6	10
Fencing	1	4	2	7
Canoeing	1	2	0	3
Surfing	1	0	1	2
Taekwondo	1	0	1	2
Triathlon	1	0	1	2
Rugby sevens	1	0	0	1
Volleyball	1	0	0	1
Basketball	0	3	0	3
Boxing	0	2	1	3
Archery	0	1	1	2
Equestrian	0	1	1	2
Sailing	0	1	1	2
Athletics	0	1	0	1
Breaking	0	1	0	1
Football	0	1	0	1
Handball	0	1	0	1
Modern pentathlon	0	1	0	1
Shooting	0	1	0	1
Table tennis	0	0	2	2
Total	16	26	22	64

Medals by gender
Gender	1st place, gold medalist(s)	2nd place, silver medalist(s)	3rd place, bronze medalist(s)	Total
Male	11	14	13	38
Female	4	11	8	23
Mixed	1	1	1	3
Total	16	26	22	64

Medals by date
Date	1st place, gold medalist(s)	2nd place, silver medalist(s)	3rd place, bronze medalist(s)	Total
27 July	1	2	1	4
28 July	2	1	1	4
29 July	2	5	1	8
30 July	0	1	1	2
31 July	3	1	4	8
1 August	0	1	0	1
2 August	3	1	5	9
3 August	1	2	2	5
4 August	0	0	3	3
5 August	1	2	1	4
6 August	0	0	0	0
7 August	0	1	2	3
8 August	1	2	0	3
9 August	0	1	1	2
10 August	2	4	0	6
11 August	0	2	0	2
Total	16	26	22	64

Multiple medalists
Name	Sport	1st place, gold medalist(s)	2nd place, silver medalist(s)	3rd place, bronze medalist(s)	Total
Léon Marchand	Swimming	4	0	1	5
Teddy Riner	Judo	2	0	0	2
Joan-Benjamin Gaba	Judo	1	1	0	2
Luka Mkheidze	Judo	1	1	0	2
Clarisse Agbegnenou	Judo	1	0	1	2
Shirine Boukli	Judo	1	0	1	2
Amandine Buchard	Judo	1	0	1	2
Sarah Leonie Cysique	Judo	1	0	1	2
Romane Dicko	Judo	1	0	1	2
Maxime-Gael Ngayap Hambou	Judo	1	0	1	2
Auriane Mallo	Fencing	0	2	0	2
Florent Manaudou	Swimming	0	0	2	2
Félix Lebrun	Table tennis	0	0	2	2

== Competitors ==
The French Olympic Committee officialized the list of competitors on 8 July 2024.

Sport	Men	Women	Total
Archery	3	3	6
Artistic swimming	—N/a	8	8
Athletics	49	41	90
Badminton	5	4	9
Basketball	16	16	32
Boxing	4	4	8
Breaking	2	2	4
Canoeing	6	7	13
Cycling	17	14	31
Diving	5	4	9
Equestrian	8	1	9
Fencing	9	9	18
Field hockey	16	16	32
Football	18	18	36
Golf	2	2	4
Gymnastics	2	12	14
Handball	14	14	28
Judo	7	7	14
Modern pentathlon	2	2	4
Rowing	8	4	12
Rugby sevens	12	12	24
Sailing	7	7	14
Shooting	7	8	15
Skateboarding	4	3	7
Sport climbing	3	4	7
Surfing	2	2	4
Swimming	18	15	33
Table tennis	3	3	6
Taekwondo	2	2	4
Tennis	6	4	10
Triathlon	3	3	6
Volleyball	16	16	32
Water polo	13	13	26
Weightlifting	2	2	4
Wrestling	1	2	3
Total	291	282	573

== Archery ==
As the host nation, France received a direct quota place in the men's and women's individual and team events as well as the mixed team event. The athletes were named on 28 June 2024.

Men

Athlete	Event	Ranking round		Round of 64	Round of 32	Round of 16	Quarterfinals	Semifinals	Final / BM	
Athlete	Event	Score	Seed	Opposition Score	Opposition Score	Opposition Score	Opposition Score	Opposition Score	Opposition Score	Rank
Baptiste Addis	Individual	678	6	Yeremenko (KAZ); W 6–2	Wise (GBR); W 7–3	Grande (MEX); W 6–4	Unruh (GER); L 5^{10}–6^{X}	Did not advance		
Thomas Chirault	Individual	676	9	Hernández (COL); W 7–1	Tai (TPE); W 6^{10}–5^{8}	Gazoz (TUR); L 5–6	Did not advance			
Jean-Charles Valladont	Individual	671	19	C Hall (GBR); L 4–6	Did not advance					
Baptiste Addis; Thomas Chirault; Jean-Charles Valladont	Team	2025	2	—N/a		Bye	Italy; W 6–2	Turkey; W 5–4	South Korea; L 1–5	2nd place, silver medalist(s)

Women

Athlete	Event	Ranking round		Round of 64	Round of 32	Round of 16	Quarterfinals	Semifinals	Final / BM	
Athlete	Event	Score	Seed	Opposition Score	Opposition Score	Opposition Score	Opposition Score	Opposition Score	Opposition Score	Rank
Lisa Barbelin	Individual	652	30	Schloesser (NED); W 6–2	Yang (CHN); W 6–2	Caetano (BRA); W 6–2	Choirunisa (INA); W 6^{10}–5^{8}	Lim (KOR); L 0–6	Jeon (KOR); W 6–4	3rd place, bronze medalist(s)
Amélie Cordeau	Individual	661	17	Baránková (SVK); W 7–3	Havers (GBR); L 5^{9}–6^{10}	Did not advance				
Caroline Lopez	Individual	659	21	Paeglis (AUS); W 6–4	Noda (JPN); L 2–6	Did not advance				
Lisa Barbelin; Amélie Cordeau; Caroline Lopez	Team	1972	5	—N/a		Netherlands; L 0–6	Did not advance			

Mixed

Athlete	Event	Ranking round		Round of 16	Quarterfinals	Semifinals	Final / BM	
Athlete	Event	Score	Seed	Opposition Score	Opposition Score	Opposition Score	Opposition Score	Rank
Baptiste Addis; Lisa Barbelin	Team	1339	8 Q	Italy; L 0–6	Did not advance			

== Artistic swimming ==
As the host nation, France received a direct quota place both in the women's duet and the eight-member mixed team events. The teams were named on 18 May 2024, and the alternates were named on 6 July 2024.

Athlete	Event	Technical routine		Free routine (preliminary)			Free routine (final)		
Athlete	Event	Points	Rank	Points	Total (technical + free)	Rank	Points	Total (technical + free)	Rank
Eve Planeix; Anastasia Bayandina	Duet	241.3116	10	—N/a			189.0687	430.3803	14
Eve Planeix; Anastasia Bayandina; Laelys Alavez; Ambre Esnault; Romane Lunel; Laura Gonzalez; Laura Tremble; Charlotte Tremble; Manon Disbeaux (alternate)	Team	277.7925	6	340.0561	617.8486	7	268.8001	886.6487	4

== Athletics ==
French track and field athletes achieved the entry standards for Paris 2024 either by passing the direct qualifying mark (or time for track and road races) or by world ranking with a maximum of 3 athletes per event. France qualified a team for the mixed marathon walk relay through a top-ten finish at the 2024 World Athletics Race Walking Team Championships. France qualified its relays through the 2024 World Athletics Relays. The final selection of athletes was made on 7 July 2024.

Key

- Note–Ranks given for track events are within the athlete's heat only
- Q = Qualified for the next round
- q = Qualified for the next round as a fastest loser or, in field events, by position without achieving the qualifying target
- NR = National record
- N/A = Round not applicable for the event
- Bye = Athlete not required to compete in round

Men
Track and road events

Athlete	Event	Heat		Repechage		Semifinal		Final	
Athlete	Event	Result	Rank	Result	Rank	Result	Rank	Result	Rank
Pablo Mateo	200 m	20.58	6 R	20.57	3	Did not advance			
Ryan Zeze	200 m	20.49	4 R	20.40	1 Q	20.81	7	Did not advance	
Gilles Biron	400 m	46.19	7 R	45.87	2	Did not advance			
Corentin Le Clezio	800 m	1:45.42	4 R	1:45.72	3	Did not advance			
Benjamin Robert	800 m	1:45.92	4 R	1:45.83	2	Did not advance			
Gabriel Tual	800 m	1:45.13	1 Q	Bye		1:45.16	2 Q	1:42.14	6
Maël Gouyette	1500 m	3:37.87	32	Did not advance					
Azeddine Habz	1500 m	3:37.95	34	Did not advance					
Jimmy Gressier	5000 m	14:09.95	9	—N/a				Did not advance	
Hugo Hay	5000 m	14:09.22	7 Q	—N/a				13:26.71 SB	16
Yann Schrub	5000 m	13:53.27	11 qJ	—N/a				13:20.63	12
Jimmy Gressier	10000 m	—N/a						26:58.67 NR	13
Yann Schrub	10000 m	—N/a						DNF	
Wilhem Belocian	110 m hurdles	13.48 SB	5 R	13.45	2 Q	13.52	8	Did not advance	
Raphaël Mohamed	110 m hurdles	13.61	5 R	13.54	2 Q	13.41	7	Did not advance	
Sasha Zhoya	110 m hurdles	13.43	3 Q	Bye		13.34	4	Did not advance	
Clément Ducos	400 m hurdles	47.69 PB	2 Q	Bye		47.85	2 Q	47.76	4
Wilfried Happio	400 m hurdles	48.42	3 Q	Bye		48.66	3	Did not advance	
Ludvy Vaillant	400 m hurdles	Withdrew							
Nicolas-Marie Daru	3000 m steeplechase	8:20.52	8	—N/a				Did not advance	
Louis Gilavert	3000 m steeplechase	8:29.16	9	—N/a				Did not advance	
Alexis Miellet	3000 m steeplechase	8:22.08	9	—N/a				Did not advance	
Harold Achi-Yao; Jeff Erius; Pablo Matéo; Aymeric Priam; Dylan Vermont; Meba-Mickael Zeze; Ryan Zeze	4 × 100 m relay	38.34	2 Q	—N/a				37.81	6
Téo Andant; Gilles Biron; Thomas Jordier; Muhammad Abdallah Kounta; Loïc Prevot; Fabrisio Saidy; David Sombé; Yann Spillman	4 × 400 m relay	2:59.53 SB	1 Q	—N/a				3:07.30	9
Nicolas Navarro	Marathon	—N/a						2:09:56 SB	16
Hassan Chahdi	Marathon	—N/a						2:10:09	20
Felix Bour	Marathon	—N/a						2:13:46 SB	50
Gabriel Bordier	20 km walk	—N/a						1:21:40	24
Aurélien Quinion	20 km walk	—N/a						1:19:56	9

Field events

Athlete	Event	Qualification		Final	
Athlete	Event	Distance	Position	Distance	Position
Thibaut Collet	Pole vault	5.70	14	Did not advance	
Robin Emig	Pole vault	5.40	23	Did not advance	
Anthony Ammirati	Pole vault	5.60	15	Did not advance	
Tom Campagne	Long jump	7.51	28	Did not advance	
Thomas Gogois	Triple jump	16.77	15	Did not advance	
Jean-Marc Pontvianne	Triple jump	16.79	13	Did not advance	
Yann Chaussinand	Hammer throw	76.86	7 Q	77.38	8
Teuraiterai Tupaia	Javelin throw	NM		Did not advance	
Tom Reux	Discus throw	58.22	29	Did not advance	
Lolassonn Djouhan	Discus throw	61.93	19	Did not advance	

Combined events – Men's decathlon

Athlete	Event	100 m	LJ	SP	HJ	400 m	110H	DT	PV	JT	1500 m	Final	Rank
Kevin Mayer	Result	Withdrew											
Kevin Mayer	Points	Withdrew											
Makenson Gletty	Result	10.72	7.10	16.64	1.99	47.48 PB	13.96	46.03 SB	4.70	53.02	4:35.58	8309	12
Makenson Gletty	Points	924	838	891	794	934	980	788	819	633	708	8309	12

Women
Track and road events

Athlete	Event	Heat		Repechage		Semifinal		Final	
Athlete	Event	Result	Rank	Result	Rank	Result	Rank	Result	Rank
Gémima Joseph	100 m	11.13	20	Did not advance					
Gémima Joseph	200 m	22.72	11 Q	Bye		22.69	7	Did not advance	
Hélène Parisot	200 m	22.99	21 Q	Bye		22.55	3	Did not advance	
Anaïs Bourgoin	800 m	1:58.47	4 R	1:59.52	1	1:59.62	20	Did not advance	
Rénelle Lamote	800 m	1:58.59	2 Q	Bye		1:57.78	4 q	1:58.19	5
Léna Kandissounon	800 m	2:00.97	4 R	2:03.40	6	Did not advance			
Agathe Guillemot	1500 m	3:59.22	5 Q	Bye		3:56.69	6 Q NR	3:59.08	9
Sarah Madeleine	5000 m	15:18.62	17	—N/a				Did not advance	
Alessia Zarbo	10000 m	—N/a						Did not finish	
Laëticia Bapté	100 m hurdles	13.04	5 R	12.92	4	Did not advance			
Cyréna Samba-Mayela	100 m hurdles	12.56	3 Q	Bye		12.52	4 q	12.34	2nd place, silver medalist(s)
Shana Grebo	400 m hurdles	56.70	7 R	54.91	1 Q	54.84	4	Did not advance	
Louise Maraval	400 m hurdles	55.32	21 Q	Bye		53.83	2 Q	54.53	8
Alice Finot	3000 m steeplechase	9:14.78	8 Q	—N/a				8:58.67	4 ER
Flavie Renouard	3000 m steeplechase	9:27.70	28	—N/a				Did not advance	
Chloé Galet; Gémima Joseph; Orlann Oliere; Maroussia Paré; Hélène Parisot; Sarah Richard-Mingas; Marie-Ange Rimlinger	4 × 100 m relay	42.13	2 Q	—N/a				42.23	4
Amandine Brossier; Alexe Déau; Shana Grebo; Diana Iscaye; Louise Maraval; Sounkamba Sylla; Marjorie Veyssiere	4 × 400 m relay	3:24.73	3 Q	—N/a				3:21.41 NR	5
Mélody Julien	Marathon	—N/a						2:42:32 SB	74
Méline Rollin	Marathon	—N/a						2:40:17	70
Mekdes Woldu	Marathon	—N/a						2:29:20 SB	20
Clémence Beretta	20 km walk	—N/a						1:29:55	15
Camille Moutard	20 km walk	—N/a						1:31:58	25
Pauline Stey	20 km walk	—N/a						1:31:59	26

Field events

Athlete	Event	Qualification		Final	
Athlete	Event	Distance	Position	Distance	Position
Solène Gicquel	High jump	1.88	19	Did not advance	
Nawal Meniker	High jump	1.92	8 q	1.86	11
Marie-Julie Bonnin	Pole vault	4.40	=12 q	4.60	11
Ninon Chapelle	Pole vault	4.40	=12 q	4.40	=14
Margot Chevrier	Pole vault	Withdrew			
Hilary Kpatcha	Long jump	6.59	12 q	6.56	11
Ilionis Guillaume	Triple jump	14.05	12 q	13.78	12
Mélina Robert-Michon	Discus throw	63.77 SB	7 q	57.03	12
Rose Loga	Hammer throw	68.94	19	Did not advance	
Alexandra Tavernier	Hammer throw	NM		Did not advance	

Combined events – Women's heptathlon

Athlete	Event	100H	HJ	SP	200 m	LJ	JT	800 m	Final	Rank
Auriana Lazraq-Khlass	Result	13.54	1.68	13.69	23.87	5.59	45.37	2:09.45	6110	16
Auriana Lazraq-Khlass	Points	1044	830	773	993	726	771	973	6110	16

Mixed

Athlete	Event	Heat		Final	
Athlete	Event	Time	Rank	Time	Rank
Clémence Beretta; Aurélien Quinion	Marathon walk relay	—N/a		2:56:54	11
Amandine Brossier; Louise Maraval; Téo Andant; Muhammad Abdallah Kounta; Fabrisio Saïdy	4 × 400 m relay	3:10.60	2 Q	~~3:10.84~~	DQ

== Badminton ==
Delphine Delrue and Thom Gicquel qualified for the mixed doubles tournament through their BWF World Ranking, as did Anne Tran and Margot Lambert for the women's doubles tournament. Lucas Corvée and Ronan Labar were supposed to be the French pair in the men's doubles tournament after their results at the 2024 European Championships, but an error by the Badminton World Federation in the rankings qualification resulted in the Popov brothers qualifying instead. Corvée and Labar qualified through an appeal after the ranking calculation error. As the host nation, France had two singles quotas, and Toma Junior Popov and Qi Xuefei were selected following their performance at the 2024 European Championships.

Men

Athlete	Event	Group stage				Elimination	Quarter-final	Semi-final	Final / BM	
Athlete	Event	Opposition Score	Opposition Score	Opposition Score	Rank	Opposition Score	Opposition Score	Opposition Score	Opposition Score	Rank
Toma Junior Popov	Singles	Shu (USA); W (21–11, 21–12)	Ginting (INA); W (19–21, 21–17, 21–15)	—N/a	1 Q	Lee (MAS); L (13–21, 22–24)	Did not advance			
Toma Junior Popov; Christo Popov	Doubles	Jomkoh / Kedren (THA); L (14–21, 19–21)	Kang / Seo (KOR); L (17–21, 15–21)	Král / Mendrek (CZE); W (21–18, 21–19)	3	—N/a	Did not advance			
Lucas Corvée; Ronan Labar	Doubles	Rankireddy / Shetty (IND); L (17–21, 14–21)	Alfian / Ardianto (INA); L (13–21, 10–21)	Lamsfuß / Seidel (GER); WDN	3	—N/a	Did not advance			

Women

Athlete	Event	Group stage				Elimination	Quarter-final	Semi-final	Final / BM	
Athlete	Event	Opposition Score	Opposition Score	Opposition Score	Rank	Opposition Score	Opposition Score	Opposition Score	Opposition Score	Rank
Qi Xuefei	Women's singles	Nalbantova (BUL); L (18–21, 18–21)	An S-y (KOR); L (5–21, 7–21)	—N/a	3	—N/a	Did not advance			
Margot Lambert; Anne Tran	Women's doubles	Kititharakul / Prajongjai (THA); L (21–12, 13–21, 15–21)	Baek H-n / Lee S-h (KOR); L (13–21, 8–21)	Fruergaard / Thygesen (DEN); L (16–21, 12–21)	4	—N/a	Did not advance			

Mixed

Athlete	Event	Group stage				Quarter-final	Semi-final	Final / BM	
Athlete	Event	Opposition Score	Opposition Score	Opposition Score	Rank	Opposition Score	Opposition Score	Opposition Score	Rank
Thom Gicquel; Delphine Delrue	Mixed doubles	Zheng / Huang (CHN); L (14–21, 21–23)	Kim W-h / Jeong N-e (KOR); L (20–22, 16–21)	Rivaldy / Mentari (INA); W (21–13, 21–15)	3	Did not advance			

== Basketball ==
=== 5×5 basketball ===
Summary

Team	Event	Group stage				Quarterfinal	Semifinal	Final / BM	
Team	Event	Opposition Score	Opposition Score	Opposition Score	Rank	Opposition Score	Opposition Score	Opposition Score	Rank
France men's	Men's tournament	Brazil; W 78–66	Japan; W 94–90 (OT)	Germany; L 71–85	2 Q	Canada; W 82–73	Germany; W 73–69	United States; L 87–98	2nd place, silver medalist(s)
France women's	Women's tournament	Canada; W 75–54	Nigeria; W 75–54	Australia; L 72–79	1 Q	Germany; W 84–71	Belgium; W 81–75 (OT)	United States; L 66–67	2nd place, silver medalist(s)

==== Men's tournament ====
The French men's basketball team qualified for the Olympics as the host nation.

Team roster

A 19-player roster was announced on 16 May 2024. The final squad was announced on 7 July 2024.

France men's national basketball team – 2024 Summer Olympics roster
Players
Coaches

Pos.	No.	Name	Age – Date of birth	Height	Club	Ctr.
PG	1	Frank Ntilikina	25 – 28 July 1998	1.98 m (6 ft 6 in)	Partizan	(Serbia)
SF	5	Nicolas Batum (C)	35 – 14 December 1988	2.03 m (6 ft 8 in)	Los Angeles Clippers	(United States)
PG	6	Andrew Albicy	34 – 21 March 1990	1.78 m (5 ft 10 in)	CB Gran Canaria	(Spain)
PF	7	Guerschon Yabusele	28 – 17 December 1995	2.04 m (6 ft 8 in)	Real Madrid	(Spain)
G/F	8	Isaïa Cordinier	27 – 28 November 1996	1.96 m (6 ft 5 in)	Virtus Bologna	(Italy)
SG	10	Evan Fournier	31 – 29 October 1992	2.01 m (6 ft 7 in)	Free agent
G	12	Nando de Colo	37 – 23 June 1987	1.96 m (6 ft 5 in)	ASVEL Basket	(France)
C	26	Mathias Lessort	28 – 29 September 1995	2.06 m (6 ft 9 in)	Panathinaikos B.C.	(Greece)
C	27	Rudy Gobert	32 – 26 June 1992	2.16 m (7 ft 1 in)	Minnesota Timberwolves	(United States)
C	32	Victor Wembanyama	20 – 4 January 2004	2.22 m (7 ft 3 in)	San Antonio Spurs	(United States)
PG	85	Matthew Strazel	21 – 5 August 2002	1.84 m (6 ft 0 in)	AS Monaco	(France)
SF	99	Bilal Coulibaly	20 – 26 July 2004	2.00 m (6 ft 7 in)	Washington Wizards	(United States)

Head coach

- (France) Vincent Collet

Assistant coach(es)

- (France) Pascal Donnadieu
- (France) Ruddy Nelhomme

Legend

- (C) Team captain
- Club – describes last
  club before the competition
- Age – describes age
  on 27 July 2024

Group play

Pos	Team	Pld	W	L	PF	PA	PD	Pts	Qualification
1	Germany	3	3	0	268	221	+47	6	Quarterfinals
2	France (H)	3	2	1	243	241	+2	5	Quarterfinals
3	Brazil	3	1	2	241	248	−7	4	Quarterfinals
4	Japan	3	0	3	251	293	−42	3	

Source: FIBA
Rules for classification: 1) classification points; 2) head-to-head results; 3) head-to-head game points difference; 4) head-to-head number of game points scored.
(H) Hosts

27 July 2024
17:15

Boxscore

France	78–66	Brazil
Scoring by quarter: 15–23, 24–13, 18–9, 21–21
Pts: Batum, Wembanyama 19; Rebs: Wembanyama 9 Asts: Albicy 4		Pts: Felício, Meindl 14; Rebs: Felício 6 Asts: Dos Santos 6

Stade Pierre-Mauroy, Lille
Attendance: 26,766
Referees: Matthew Kallio (CAN), Luis Castillo (ESP), Carlos Peralta (ECU)

30 July 2024
17:15

Boxscore

Japan	90–94 (OT)	France
Scoring by quarter: 25–32, 19–17, 20–20, 20–15, Overtime: 6–10
Pts: Kawamura 29; Rebs: Hawkinson, Watanabe 8 Asts: Kawamura 6		Pts: Wembanyama 18; Rebs: Gobert 15; Asts: Fournier, Wembanyama 6

Stade Pierre-Mauroy, Lille
Attendance: 26,900
Referees: Matthew Kallio (CAN), Wojciech Liszka (POL), Blanca Burns (USA)

2 August 2024
21:00

Boxscore

France	71–85	Germany
Scoring by quarter: 18–24, 9–24, 19–21, 25–16
Pts: Wembanyama 14; Rebs: Wembanyama 12; Asts: Batum 3		Pts: Schröder, F. Wagner 26; Rebs: Theis 8 Asts: Schröder 9

Stade Pierre-Mauroy, Lille
Attendance: 26,860
Referees: Antonio Conde (ESP), Juan Fernández (ARG), Andrés Bartel (URU)

Quarterfinals

6 August 2024
18:00

Boxscore

France	82–73	Canada
Scoring by quarter: 23–10, 22–19, 16–21, 21–23
Pts: Yabusele 22; Rebs: Wembanyama 12; Asts: Wembanyama 5		Pts: Gilgeous-Alexander 27; Rebs: Powell 9 Asts: Gilgeous-Alexander 4

Accor Arena, Paris
Attendance: 12,258
Referees: Ademir Zurapović (BIH), Omar Bermúdez (MEX), Gatis Saliņš (LAT)

Semifinals

8 August 2024
17:30

Boxscore

France	73–69	Germany
Scoring by quarter: 18–25, 15–8, 23–17, 17–19
Pts: Yabusele 17; Rebs: three players 7 Asts: Wembanyama 4		Pts: Schröder 18; Rebs: Theis 11; Asts: Theis 6

Accor Arena, Paris
Attendance: 12,454
Referees: Antonio Conde (ESP), Boris Krejić (SLO), Wojciech Liszka (POL)

Gold medal game

10 August 2024
21:30

Boxscore

France	87–98	United States
Scoring by quarter: 15–20, 26–29, 25–23, 21–26
Pts: Wembanyama 26; Rebs: Batum 8 Asts: Batum 4		Pts: Curry 24; Rebs: Davis 9 Asts: James 10

Accor Arena, Paris
Attendance: 12,121
Referees: Antonio Conde (ESP), Julio Anaya (PAN), Wojciech Liszka (POL)

==== Women's tournament ====
The French women's basketball team qualified for the Olympics as the host nation.

Team roster

An 18-player roster was announced on 16 May 2024. The final roster was announced on 8 June 2024.

France women's national basketball team – 2024 Summer Olympics roster roster
Players
Coaches

Pos.	No.	Name	Age – Date of birth	Height	Club	Ctr.
PG	4	Marine Fauthoux	23 – 23 January 2001	1.76 m (5 ft 9 in)	Çukurova Basketbol	(Turkey)
PF	6	Alexia Chery	25 – 5 September 1998	1.90 m (6 ft 3 in)	ASVEL Féminin	(France)
SG	10	Sarah Michel (C)	35 – 10 January 1989	1.80 m (5 ft 11 in)	Bourges Basket	(France)
SF	11	Valériane Ayayi	30 – 29 April 1994	1.84 m (6 ft 0 in)	USK Praha	(Czech Republic)
C	12	Iliana Rupert	23 – 12 July 2001	1.94 m (6 ft 4 in)	Çukurova Basketbol	(Turkey)
F	13	Janelle Salaün	22 – 5 September 2001	1.88 m (6 ft 2 in)	PF Schio	(Italy)
C	14	Dominique Malonga	18 – 16 November 2005	1.98 m (6 ft 6 in)	ASVEL Féminin	(France)
F	15	Gabby Williams	27 – 9 September 1996	1.80 m (5 ft 11 in)	Fenerbahçe	(Turkey)
C	22	Marième Badiane	29 – 24 November 1994	1.90 m (6 ft 3 in)	Fenerbahçe	(Turkey)
SG	23	Marine Johannès	29 – 21 January 1995	1.77 m (5 ft 10 in)	ASVEL Féminin	(France)
G	42	Leïla Lacan	20 – 2 June 2004	1.81 m (5 ft 11 in)	Basket Landes	(France)
PG	47	Romane Bernies	31 – 27 June 1993	1.70 m (5 ft 7 in)	BLMA	(France)

Head coach

- (France) Jean-Aimé Toupane

Assistant coach(es)

- (France) David Gautier
- (France) Grégory Halin
- (France) Catherine Melain

Legend

- (C) Team captain
- Club – describes last
  club before the tournament
- Age – describes age
  on 28 July 2024

Group play

Pos	Team	Pld	W	L	PF	PA	PD	Pts	Qualification
1	France (H)	3	2	1	222	187	+35	5 (Note: France 3 Pts, +14 PD; Australia 3 Pts, −6 PD; Nigeria 3 Pts, −8 PD.)	Quarterfinals
2	Australia	3	2	1	211	212	−1	5	Quarterfinals
3	Nigeria	3	2	1	208	207	+1	5	Quarterfinals
4	Canada	3	0	3	189	224	−35	3	

Source: FIBA
Rules for classification: 1) classification points; 2) head-to-head results; 3) head-to-head game points difference; 4) head-to-head number of game points scored.
(H) Hosts
Notes:

29 July 2024
17:15

Boxscore

Canada	54–75	France
Scoring by quarter: 18–15, 2–23, 16–15, 18–22
Pts: Colley, Nurse 11; Rebs: Alexander 10; Asts: Colley 6		Pts: Badiane 13; Rebs: Badiane 6 Asts: Williams 8

Stade Pierre-Mauroy, Lille
Attendance: 20,211
Referees: Boris Krejić (SLO), Blanca Burns (USA), Ariadna Chueca (ESP)

1 August 2024
17:15

Boxscore

France	75–54	Nigeria
Scoring by quarter: 24–20, 14–11, 16–8, 21–15
Pts: Johannès 15; Rebs: Badiane 6 Asts: Williams 7		Pts: Kalu 18; Rebs: Musa 9 Asts: Amukamara 5

Stade Pierre-Mauroy, Lille
Attendance: 17,483
Referees: Amy Bonner (USA), Carlos Peralta (ECU), Péter Praksch (HUN)

4 August 2024
21:00

Boxscore

Australia	79–72	France
Scoring by quarter: 19–17, 15–17, 25–16, 20–22
Pts: Madgen 18; Rebs: Magbegor, Talbot 6 Asts: Whitcomb 7		Pts: Williams 15; Rebs: Badiane 6 Asts: Bernies 4

Stade Pierre-Mauroy, Lille
Attendance: 27,193
Referees: Luis Castillo (ESP), Maj Forsberg (DEN), Jenna Reneau (USA)

Quarterfinals

7 August 2024
18:00

Boxscore

Germany	71–84	France
Scoring by quarter: 19–23, 14–22, 16–21, 22–18
Pts: N. Sabally 20; Rebs: N. Sabally 13; Asts: Fiebich, Peterson 3		Pts: Johannès 24; Rebs: Williams 6 Asts: Williams 5

Accor Arena, Paris
Attendance: 12,399
Referees: Amy Bonner (USA), Carlos Peralta (ECU), Blanca Burns (USA)

Semifinal

9 August 2024
21:00

Boxscore

France	81–75 (OT)	Belgium
Scoring by quarter: 14–17, 17–19, 17–15, 18–15, Overtime: 15–9
Pts: Williams 18; Rebs: Badiane, Rupert 7 Asts: Johannès 5		Pts: Meesseman 19; Rebs: Meesseman 14; Asts: three players 6

Accor Arena, Paris
Attendance: 12,389
Referees: Luis Castillo (ESP), Takaki Kato (JPN), Ariadna Chueca (ESP)

Final

11 August 2024
15:30

Boxscore

France	66–67	United States
Scoring by quarter: 9–15, 16–10, 18–20, 23–22
Pts: Williams 19; Rebs: Williams 7 Asts: Badiane 3		Pts: Wilson 21; Rebs: Wilson 13; Asts: Gray, Plum 4

Accor Arena, Paris
Attendance: 12,126
Referees: Boris Krejić (SLO), Viola Györgyi (NOR), Martin Vulić (CRO)

=== 3×3 basketball ===
Summary

Team	Event	Group stage								Quarterfinal	Semifinal	Final / BM	
Team	Event	Opposition Score	Opposition Score	Opposition Score	Opposition Score	Opposition Score	Opposition Score	Opposition Score	Rank	Opposition Score	Opposition Score	Opposition Score	Rank
France men's	Men's tournament	Poland; W 21–19	Lithuania; W 21–20	Netherlands; L 13–20	Serbia; L 16–19	Latvia; L 20–22	United States; L 19–21	China; W 21–12	5 Q	Serbia; W 22–19	Latvia; W 21–14	Netherlands; L 17–18 (OT)	2nd place, silver medalist(s)
France women's	Women's tournament	China; L 19–21	Spain; L 12–17	Azerbaijan; W 15–10	Canada; L 9–13	United States; L 13–14	Germany; L 13–14	Australia; W 18–16 (OT)	8	Did not advance			

==== Men's tournament ====
The French men's 3x3 team qualified for the Olympics with a top three finish at the 2024 FIBA Olympic Qualifying Tournament in Debrecen, Hungary.

Team roster

The team was announced on 8 June 2024.

- Lucas Dussoulier
- Jules Rambaut
- Franck Seguela
- Timothé Vergiat

Group play

Pos	Team	Pld	W	L	PF	PA	PD	Qualification
1	Latvia	7	7	0	147	103	+44	Semifinals
2	Netherlands	7	5	2	133	112	+21	Semifinals
3	Lithuania	7	4 (Note: Lithuania 20–18 Serbia)	3	134	125	+9	Play-ins
4	Serbia	7	4	3	129	123	+6	Play-ins
5	France (H)	7	3	4	131	132	−1	Play-ins
6	Poland	7	2 (Note: United States 17–19 Poland)	5	116	139	−23	Play-ins
7	United States	7	2	5	116	138	−22	
8	China	7	1	6	107	141	−34	

Source: FIBA
Rules for classification: 1) Wins; 2) Head-to-head record; 3) Points scored.
(H) Hosts
Notes:

30 July 2024
22:05
v

Boxscore

Poland	19–21	France
Pts: Bogucki, Zamojski 6		Pts: Dussoulier 9

Place de la Concorde, Paris
Referees: Brigitta Csabai-Kaskötő (HUN), Vlad Ghizdareanu (ROU)

31 July 2024
22:05
v

Boxscore

Lithuania	20–21	France
Pts: Džiaugys, Pukelis 7		Pts: Rambaut 9

Place de la Concorde, Paris
Referees: Edmond Ho (HKG), Shi Qirong (CHN)

1 August 2024
14:05
v

Boxscore

Netherlands	20–13	France
Pts: van der Horst 8		Pts: Dussoulier 6

Place de la Concorde, Paris
Referees: Jasmina Juras (SRB), Brigitta Csabai-Kaskötő (HUN)

1 August 2024
22:35
v

Boxscore

Serbia	19–16	France
Pts: Majstorović 9		Pts: Seguela 7

Place de la Concorde, Paris
Referees: Edmond Ho (HKG), Marek Maliszewski (POL)

2 August 2024
14:05
v

Boxscore

France	20–22	Latvia
Pts: Seguela 10		Pts: Miezis 10

Place de la Concorde, Paris
Referees: Brigitta Csabai-Kaskötő (HUN), Marek Maliszewski (POL)

2 August 2024
18:35
v

Boxscore

France	19–21	United States
Pts: Seguela 7		Pts: Barry 16

Place de la Concorde, Paris
Referees: Shi Qirong (CHN), Edmond Ho (HKG)

4 August 2024
17:30
v

Boxscore

France	21–12	China
Pts: Dussoulier, Rambaut 6		Pts: Zhang 4

Place de la Concorde, Paris
Referees: Jasmina Juras (SRB), Vlad Ghizdareanu (ROU)

Play-in

4 August 2024
22:05
v

Boxscore

Serbia	19–22	France
Pts: Stojačić 8		Pts: Rambaut 8

Place de la Concorde, Paris
Referees: Vlad Ghizdareanu (ROU), Deanna Jackson (USA)

Semifinal

5 August 2024
19:00
v

Boxscore

Latvia	14–21	France
Pts: Lasmanis 11		Pts: Dussoulier 9

Place de la Concorde, Paris
Referees: Brigitta Csabai-Kaskötő (HUN), Edmond Ho (HKG)

Gold medal game

5 August 2024
22:30
v

Report

France	17–18 (OT)	Netherlands
Pts: Dussoulier, Seguela 5		Pts: De Jong 7

Place de la Concorde, Paris
Referees: Vlad Ghizdareanu (ROU), Jasmina Juras (SRB)

==== Women's tournament ====
The French women's 3x3 team qualified for the Olympics as the host nation.

Team roster

The team was announced on 8 June 2024.

- Myriam Djekoundade
- Laëtitia Guapo
- Hortense Limouzin
- Marie-Ève Paget

Group play

Pos	Team	Pld	W	L	PF	PA	PD	Qualification
1	Germany	7	6	1	117	100	+17	Semifinals
2	Spain	7	4 (Note: Spain 2–1; United States 2–1; Canada 1–2; Australia 1–2. Sorted by points scored after first tie broken.)	3	115	114	+1	Semifinals
3	United States	7	4	3	108	109	−1	Play-ins
4	Canada	7	4	3	129	112	+17	Play-ins
5	Australia	7	4	3	127	122	+5	Play-ins
6	China	7	2 (Note: China 1–1; France 1–1; Azerbaijan 1–1. Sorted by points scored.)	5	107	123	−16	Play-ins
7	Azerbaijan	7	2	5	106	123	−17	
8	France (H)	7	2	5	99	105	−6	

Source: FIBA
Rules for classification: 1) Wins; 2) Head-to-head record; 3) Points scored.
(H) Hosts
Notes:

30 July 2024
21:30

Boxscore

France	19–21	China
Pts: Limouzin 6		Pts: Chen 10

Place de la Concorde, Paris
Referees: Deanna Jackson (USA), Brigitta Csabai-Kaskötő (HUN)

31 July 2024
21:00

Boxscore

France	12–17	Spain
Pts: four players 3		Pts: Ygueravide 9

Place de la Concorde, Paris
Referees: Shi Qirong (CHN), Kim Ga-in (KOR)

1 August 2024
12:30

Boxscore

Azerbaijan	10–15	France
Pts: Hayes 5		Pts: Limouzin 5

Place de la Concorde, Paris
Referees: Dorothy Okatch (BOT), Markos Michaelides (SUI)

1 August 2024
22:00

Boxscore

Canada	13–9	France
Pts: Crozon, K. Plouffe 4		Pts: Limouzin 4

Place de la Concorde, Paris
Referees: Kim Ga-in (KOR), Shi Qirong (CHN)

2 August 2024
13:00

Boxscore

United States	14–13	France
Pts: three players 4		Pts: Guapo 5

Place de la Concorde, Paris
Referees: Brigitta Csabai-Kaskötő (HUN), Marek Maliszewski (POL)

2 August 2024
21:30

Boxscore

France	13–14	Germany
Pts: Guapo 4		Pts: Greinacher 7

Place de la Concorde, Paris
Referees: Shi Qirong (CHN), Vlad Ghizdareanu (ROU)

3 August 2024
18:35

Boxscore

France	18–16 (OT)	Australia
Pts: Guapo 7		Pts: Whittle 8

Place de la Concorde, Paris
Referees: Marek Maliszewski (POL), Kim Ga-in (KOR)

== Boxing ==
France entered eight boxers, four men and four women, into the Olympic tournament. The 2019 World bronze medalist and 2020 Olympian in men's flyweight Billal Bennama, 2016 Olympic silver medalist and two-time Olympian in men's lightweight Sofiane Oumiha, and 2016 Olympic women's lightweight champion Estelle Mossely, along with four rookies (Traoré, Lkhadiri, Zidani, and Michel), secured the spots on the host nation's squad in their respective weight divisions, either by advancing to the semifinal match or finishing in the top two, at the 2023 European Games in Nowy Targ, Poland. Additionally, Djamili Aboudou Moindze qualified in men's super heavyweight by winning the quota bouts round at the 2024 World Olympic Qualification Tournament 1 in Busto Arsizio, Italy.

Men

Athlete	Event	Round of 32	Round of 16	Quarterfinals	Semifinals	Final	
Athlete	Event	Opposition Result	Opposition Result	Opposition Result	Opposition Result	Opposition Result	Rank
Billal Bennama	51 kg	—N/a	Hill (USA); W 3–2	Claro (CUB); W 3–2	Alcántara (DOM); W 5–0	Dusmatov (UZB); L 0–5	2nd place, silver medalist(s)
Sofiane Oumiha	63.5 kg	Bye	Al-Kasbeh (JOR); W 5–0	Kovács (HUN); W 5–0	Sanford (CAN); W 4–1	Álvarez (CUB); L 2–3	2nd place, silver medalist(s)
Makan Traoré	71 kg	Walsh (IRL); W 4–0	Terteryan (DEN); L 1–4	Did not advance			
Djamili-Dini Aboudou Moindze	+92 kg	—N/a	Kadi (ALG); W 4–1	Congo (ECU); W 4–1	Ghadfa (ESP); L 0–5	Did not advance	3rd place, bronze medalist(s)

Women

Athlete	Event	Round of 32	Round of 16	Quarterfinals	Semifinals	Final	
Athlete	Event	Opposition Result	Opposition Result	Opposition Result	Opposition Result	Opposition Result	Rank
Wassila Lkhadiri	50 kg	Bye	Moorehouse (IRL); W 4–1	Villegas (PHI); L 2–3	Did not advance		
Amina Zidani	57 kg	Bye	Petecio (PHI); L 1–4	Did not advance			
Estelle Mossely	60 kg	Gonzalez (USA); L 0–4	Did not advance				
Davina Michel	75 kg	—N/a	Manikon (THA); W 5–0	Ngamba (EOR); L 0–5	Did not advance		

== Breaking ==
As the host nation, France is automatically received a quota place each for the B-Boys and B-Girls events. Dany Dann (Dany) secured a direct spot on the host nation's team by winning the B-boy final battle at the 2023 European Games in Nowy Sącz, Poland. Athletes qualified through their performance at the 2024 Olympic qualifier series.

Athlete	Nickname	Event	Round-robin		Quarterfinal	Semifinal	Final / BM	
Athlete	Nickname	Event	Points	Rank	Opposition Result	Opposition Result	Opposition Result	Rank
Danis Civil	Dany Dann	B-Boys	37	2 Q	Jeffro (USA); W 2–1	Victor (USA); W 2–1	Phil Wizard (CAN); L 0–3	2nd place, silver medalist(s)
Gaëtan Alin	Lagaet	B-Boys	15	4	Did not advance			13
Carlota Dudek	Carlota	B-Girls	12	4	Did not advance			13
Sya Dembélé	Syssy	B-Girls	33	2 Q	Ami (JPN); L 0–3	Did not advance		7

== Canoeing ==
=== Slalom ===
France qualified four boats for the slalom competition at the 2023 ICF Canoe Slalom World Championships in London, Great Britain. The selection of athletes was announced on 12 October 2023.

Athlete	Event	Preliminary						Semifinal		Final	
Athlete	Event	Run 1	Rank	Run 2	Rank	Best	Rank	Time	Rank	Time	Rank
Nicolas Gestin	Men's C-1	89.90	1	88.78	1	88.78	1	93.12	1	91.36	1st place, gold medalist(s)
Titouan Castryck	Men's K-1	83.71	1	80.09	1	80.09	1	91.56	4	88.42	2nd place, silver medalist(s)
Marjorie Delassus	Women's C-1	108.34	8	119.22	17	108.34	13	118.84	13	Did not advance	
Camille Prigent	Women's K-1	94.67	1	93.25	3	93.25	3	104.36	7	101.67	6

=== Kayak cross ===
As the host nation, France received one quota in both the men's and women's kayak cross events. The selection of athletes was announced on 12 October 2023. Angèle Hug and Boris Neveu earned additional quotas with top three finishes at the ICF Kayak Cross Global Qualification Competition in Prague.

Athlete	Event	Time trial	Rank	Round 1	Repechage	Heat	Quarterfinal	Semifinal	Final	
Athlete	Event	Time trial	Rank	Position	Position	Position	Position	Position	Position	Rank
Titouan Castryck	Men's KX-1	67.29	3	1 Q	Bye	1 Q	3	Did not advance		9
Boris Neveu	Men's KX-1	67.48	4	1 Q	Bye	1 Q	1 Q	3 FB	3	7
Angèle Hug	Women's KX-1	73.27	10	1 Q	Bye	1 Q	1 Q	2 Q	2	2nd place, silver medalist(s)
Camille Prigent	Women's KX-1	70.33	1	1 Q	Bye	1 Q	3	Did not advance		9

=== Sprint ===
French canoeists qualified two boats in each of the following distances at the 2023 ICF Canoe Sprint World Championships in Duisburg, Germany. The first athletes were named on 15 May 2024.

Men

Athlete	Event	Heats		Quarterfinals		Semifinals		Final	
Athlete	Event	Time	Rank	Time	Rank	Time	Rank	Time	Rank
Maxime Beaumont	Men's K-1 1000 m	3:30.64	3 QF	3:29.66	1 SF	3:30.99	5 FB	3:31.42	15
Adrien Bart	Men's C-1 1000 m	3:46.93	2 SF	Bye		3:49.56	6 FB	3:59.82	16
Adrien Bart; Loïc Léonard	Men's C-2 500 m	1:44.00	4 QF	1:45.24	3 SF	1:40.98	5 FB	1:43.82	10

Women

Athlete	Event	Heats		Quarterfinals		Semifinals		Final	
Athlete	Event	Time	Rank	Time	Rank	Time	Rank	Time	Rank
Manon Hostens	Women's K-1 500 m	1:57.13	5 QF	1:52.82	5 SF	1:51.36	5 FC	1:53.10	19
Vanina Paoletti; Manon Hostens	Women's K-2 500 m	1:45.34	4 QF	1:41.43	2 SF	1:40.62	7 FB	1:45.18	13
Eugénie Dorange	Women's C-1 200 m	49.22	5 QF	49.67	5	Did not advance			
Eugénie Dorange; Axelle Renard	Women's C-2 500 m	2:01.68	6 QF	2:00.91	3 SF	1:57.14	5 FB	1:57.02	10

Qualification Legend: FA = Qualify to final (medal); FB = Qualify to final B (non-medal)

== Cycling ==
=== Road ===
In the women's individual time trial, France obtained one quota with a top 10 finish at the 2023 UCI Road World Championships in Glasgow, Great Britain, while the other two quotas were obtained in men's and women's road race events, as the host nation allocation quotas. The women's team was announced on 18 May 2024, and the men's team was announced on 8 July 2024.

Men

Athlete	Event	Time	Rank
Julian Alaphilippe	Road race	6:20:59	11
Christophe Laporte	Road race	6:20:50	3rd place, bronze medalist(s)
Valentin Madouas	Road race	6:20:45	2nd place, silver medalist(s)
Kévin Vauquelin	Road race	6:23:16	34
Kévin Vauquelin	Time trial	38:04.93	15

Women

Athlete	Event	Time	Rank
Audrey Cordon-Ragot	Road race	4:07.04	38
Juliette Labous	Road race	4:07:16	46
Victoire Berteau	Road race	4:04:23	27
Audrey Cordon-Ragot	Time trial	41:51.67	9
Juliette Labous	Time trial	41:19.90	4

=== Track ===
France obtained spots for men's and women's sprint, keirin, team pursuit, madison, and omnium events following the conclusion of the final UCI Olympic rankings. The sprint and keirin team was announced on 3 May 2024. The rest of the team was announced on 28 June 2024.

Sprint

Athlete	Event	Qualification		Round 1	Repechage 1	Round 2	Repechage 2	Round 3	Repechage 3	Quarterfinals	Semifinals	Finals / BM	
Athlete	Event	Time Speed (km/h)	Rank	Opposition Time Speed (km/h)	Opposition Time Speed (km/h)	Opposition Time Speed (km/h)	Opposition Time Speed (km/h)	Opposition Time Speed (km/h)	Opposition Time Speed (km/h)	Opposition Time Speed (km/h)	Opposition Time Speed (km/h)	Opposition Time Speed (km/h)	Rank
Rayan Helal	Men's sprint	9.447; 76.215	13 Q	Ortega (COL); L 9.950; 72.413	Rorke (CAN); Wammes (CAN); W9.916; 72.610	Lavreysen (NED); L 10.011; 72.713	Ota (JPN); L 10.124; 71.457	Did not advance					
Sébastien Vigier	Men's sprint	9.501; 75.781	17 Q	Ota (JPN); L 9.993; 72.391	Obara (JPN); Dörnbach (GER); L 9.978; 73.253	Did not advance							
Mathilde Gros	Women's sprint	10.182; 70.713	5 Q	Ohta (JPN); W 11.001; 65.449	Bye	Bayona (COL); W 10.788; 66.741	Bye	van de Wouw (NED); L 10.977; 67.089	Bayona (COL); Fulton (NZL); L 10.898; 66.231	Did not advance			
Taky Marie-Divine Kouamé	Women's sprint	10.634; 67.707	18 Q	Sato (JPN); L 11.135; 65.318	Karwacka (POL); Cuadrado (COL); W 11.211; 64.223	Andrews (NZL); L 11.417; 63.881	Clonan (AUS); L 11.664; 66.642	Did not advance					

Team sprint

Athlete	Event	Qualification		Semifinals		Final	
Athlete	Event	Time Speed (km/h)	Rank	Opposition Time Speed (km/h)	Rank	Opposition Time Speed (km/h)	Rank
Florian Grengbo; Rayan Helal; Sébastien Vigier; Melvin Landerneau (alternate)	Men's team sprint	42.267	5	42.376	1 FB	41.993	4

Qualification legend: FA=Gold medal final; FB=Bronze medal final

Pursuit

Athlete	Event	Qualification		Semifinals		Final	
Athlete	Event	Time	Rank	Opponent Results	Rank	Opponent Results	Rank
Thomas Boudat; Thomas Denis; Valentin Tabellion; Benjamin Thomas; Oscar Nilsson-Julien (alternate)	Men's team pursuit	3:45.514	5 q	3:45.531	6	3:47.697	6
Victoire Berteau; Marion Borras; Clara Copponi; Marie Le Net	Women's team pursuit	4:08.797	7 q	4:08.292	6	4:06.987	5

Keirin

Athlete	Event	Round 1	Repechage	Quarterfinals	Semifinals	Final
Athlete	Event	Rank	Rank	Rank	Rank	Rank
Rayan Helal	Men's keirin	5 R	5	Did not advance		
Sébastien Vigier	Men's keirin	3 R	3	Did not advance		
Mathilde Gros	Women's keirin	2 Q	Bye	1 SF	5 FB	8
Taky Marie-Divine Kouamé	Women's keirin	3 R	5	Did not advance		

Omnium

Athlete	Event	Scratch race		Tempo race		Elimination race		Points race		Total	
Athlete	Event	Rank	Points	Rank	Points	Rank	Points	Rank	Points	Points	Rank
Benjamin Thomas	Men's omnium	1	40	11	20	3	38	1	98	164	1st place, gold medalist(s)
Valentine Fortin	Women's omnium	21	1	19	4	11	20	16	25	50	16

Madison

Athlete	Event	Points	Laps	Rank
Thomas Boudat; Benjamin Thomas	Men's madison	−18	−20	11
Marion Borras; Clara Copponi	Women's madison	17	0	5

=== Mountain biking ===
France qualified a full squad of mountain bikers through the final Olympic mountain biking rankings.

Athlete	Event	Time	Rank
Victor Koretzky	Men's cross-country	1:26:31	2nd place, silver medalist(s)
Jordan Sarrou	Men's cross-country	1:29:08	14
Pauline Ferrand-Prévot	Women's cross-country	1:26:02	1st place, gold medalist(s)
Loana Lecomte	Women's cross-country	Did not finish	

=== BMX ===
==== Freestyle ====
France qualified one athlete per gender through its host country quota. Anthony Jeanjean and Laury Perez were selected following their performances at the 2024 Olympic Qualifier Series.

Athlete	Event	Seeding		Final	
Athlete	Event	Points	Rank	Points	Rank
Anthony Jeanjean	Men's freestyle	87.58	5 Q	93.76	3rd place, bronze medalist(s)
Laury Perez	Women's freestyle	83.26	9 Q	64.30	9

==== Race ====
French riders secured four quota places (three men's and one women's) through the allocations of the final Olympic BMX ranking. The selection of riders was announced on 5 June 2024. Arthur Pilard and Tessa Martinez were designated as the replacement athletes.

Athlete	Event	Quarterfinal		Semifinal		Final	
Athlete	Event	Points	Rank	Points	Rank	Result	Rank
Sylvain André	Men's	4	1 Q	5	3 Q	31.706	2nd place, silver medalist(s)
Joris Daudet	Men's	5	3 Q	4	2 Q	31.422	1st place, gold medalist(s)
Romain Mahieu	Men's	5	2 Q	3	1 Q	32.022	3rd place, bronze medalist(s)
Axelle Étienne	Women's	16	12 Q	15	8 Q	36.273	7

== Diving ==
As the host nation, France received four men's and four women's spots in each of the synchronized diving events. Jules Bouyer and Gwendal Bisch secured a spot for the men's 3 m springboard through their performance at the 2024 World Aquatics Championships. The divers were named on 28 May 2024 by the French federation.

Athlete	Event	Preliminary		Semifinal		Final	
Athlete	Event	Points	Rank	Points	Rank	Points	Rank
Gwendal Bisch	Men's 3 m springboard	387.00	13	392.70	16	Did not advance	
Jules Bouyer	Men's 3 m springboard	407.30	6	438.30	6 Q	395.70	8
Alexis Jandard; Jules Bouyer	Men's 3 m synchronized springboard	—N/a				369.30	5
Lois Szymczak; Gary Hunt	Men's 10 m synchronized platform	—N/a				314.58	8
Naïs Gillet; Juliette Landi	Women's 3 m synchronized springboard	—N/a				240.03	8
Emily Hallifax; Jade Gillet	Women's 10 m synchronized platform	—N/a				234.84	8

== Equestrian ==
As the host nation, France automatically entered a full squad of equestrian riders each to the team dressage, eventing, and jumping competitions at the Games. The team was named on 6 July 2024.

=== Dressage ===
Athlete	Horse	Event	Grand Prix		Grand Prix Special		Grand Prix Freestyle		Overall	
Athlete	Horse	Event	Score	Rank	Score	Rank	Technical	Artistic	Score	Rank
Alexandre Ayache	Holmevangs Jolene	Individual	70.279	31	—N/a		Did not advance			
Pauline Basquin	Sertorius de Rima Z	Individual	73.711	16	—N/a		73.607	84.629	79.118	16
Corentin Pottier	Gotilas du Feuillard	Individual	70.683	29	—N/a		Did not advance			
Alexandre Ayache; Pauline Basquin; Corentin Pottier; Anne-Sophie Serre (alternate)	See above	Team	214.673	7	215.289	6	—N/a		215.289	6

Qualification Legend: Q = Qualified for the final based on position in group; q = Qualified for the final based on overall position

=== Eventing ===
Athlete	Horse	Event	Dressage		Cross-country			Jumping						Total	
Athlete	Horse	Event	Dressage		Cross-country			Qualifier			Final			Total	
Athlete	Horse	Event	Penalties	Rank	Penalties	Total	Rank	Penalties	Total	Rank	Penalties	Total	Rank	Penalties	Rank
Karim Laghouag	Triton Fontaine	Individual	29.60	22	0.00	29.60	10	4.00	33.60	14	4.00	37.60	15	37.60	15
Stéphane Landois	Chaman Dumontceau	Individual	24.40	7	2.80	27.20	7	4.40	31.60	9	4.00	35.60	14	35.60	14
Nicolas Touzaint	Diabolo Menthe	Individual	27.20	17	3.20	30.40	11	8.00	38.40	20	8.00	46.40	25	46.40	25
Karim Laghouag; Stéphane Landois; Nicolas Touzaint; Gireg Le Coz (alternate)	See above	Team	81.20	3	6.00	87.20	2	16.40	103.6	2	—N/a			103.6	2nd place, silver medalist(s)

=== Jumping ===
Athlete	Horse	Event	Qualification		Final			Jump-off		
Athlete	Horse	Event	Penalties	Rank	Penalties	Time	Rank	Penalties	Time	Rank
Simon Delestre	I.Amelusina R 51	Individual	4.00	22 Q	8.00	81.25	17	Did not advance		
Julien Epaillard	Dubai du Cèdre	Individual	0.00	1 Q	4.00	79.18	4	Did not advance		
Olivier Perreau	Dorai D'Aiguilly	Individual	4.00	32	Did not advance					
Simon Delestre; Julien Epaillard; Kevin Staut; Olivier Perreau (alternate)	See above	Team	12	7	7	238.12	3rd place, bronze medalist(s)	—N/a		

== Fencing ==
France entered a full-squad of 18 fencers (nine per gender), and one alternate per weapon. Each weapon qualified for the games by placing amongst the four highest ranked worldwide team, or being the top ranked European team, at the cut-off date. Fencers were named through four selections.

Men

Athlete	Event	Round of 32	Round of 16	Quarterfinal	Semifinal	Final / BM	
Athlete	Event	Opposition Score	Opposition Score	Opposition Score	Opposition Score	Opposition Score	Rank
Yannick Borel	Épée	Sharlaimov (KAZ); W 15–13	Minobe (JPN); W 15–11	Yamada (JPN); W 12–11	El-Sayed (EGY); W 15–9	Kano (JPN); L 9–15	2nd place, silver medalist(s)
Romain Cannone	Épée	Beran (CZE); W 15–8	Kurbanov (KAZ); L 10–15	Did not advance			
Luidgi Midelton	Épée	Alimzhanov (KAZ); L 14–15	Did not advance				
Yannick Borel; Romain Cannone; Luidgi Midelton; Paul Allègre (alternate)	Team épée	—N/a		Egypt; W 45–39	Hungary; L 30–45	Czech Republic; L 41–43	4
Enzo Lefort	Foil	Chen (TPE); W 15–12	Meinhardt (USA); W 15–10	Cheung (HKG); L 14–15	Did not advance		
Maxime Pauty	Foil	Shikine (JPN); W 15–9	Marini (ITA); W 15–14	Iimura (JPN); L 14–15	Did not advance		
Julien Mertine	Foil	Matsuyama (JPN); L 6–15	Did not advance				
Enzo Lefort; Maxime Pauty; Julien Mertine; Maximilien Chastanet (alternate)	Team foil	—N/a		China; W 45–35	Japan; L 37–45	United States; W 45–32	3rd place, bronze medalist(s)
Boladé Apithy	Sabre	Szatmari (HUN); W 15–13	Arfa (CAN); L 8–15	Did not advance			
Sébastien Patrice	Sabre	Rahbari (IRI); W 15–13	Szabo (GER); L 13–15	Did not advance			
Maxime Pianfetti	Sabre	Saron (USA); L 12–15	Did not advance				
Boladé Apithy; Sébastien Patrice; Maxime Pianfetti; Jean-Philippe Patrice (alternate)	Team sabre	—N/a		Egypt; W 45–41	South Korea; L 39–45	Bronze medal final Iran; W 45–25	3rd place, bronze medalist(s)

Women

Athlete	Event	Round of 32	Round of 16	Quarterfinal	Semifinal	Final / BM	
Athlete	Event	Opposition Score	Opposition Score	Opposition Score	Opposition Score	Opposition Score	Rank
Marie-Florence Candassamy	Épée	Ehab (EGY); W 15–10	Yu SH (CHN); L 10–15	Did not advance			
Auriane Mallo	Épée	Bezhura (UKR); W 14–13	Cebula (USA); W 15–13	Kharkova (UKR); W 15–10	Muhari (HUN); W 15–9	Kong (HKG); L 12–13	2nd place, silver medalist(s)
Coraline Vitalis	Épée	Knapik-Miazga (POL); W 15–9	Santuccio (ITA); L 12–15	Did not advance			
Marie-Florence Candassamy; Auriane Mallo; Coraline Vitalis; Alexandra Louis-Marie (alternate)	Team épée	—N/a		South Korea; W 37–31	Poland; W 45–39	Italy; L 29–30	2nd place, silver medalist(s)
Eva Lacheray	Foil	Miyawaki (JPN); W 15–10	Errigo (ITA); L 6–15	Did not advance			
Pauline Ranvier	Foil	Esteban (CIV); W 15–7	Favaretto (ITA); L 9–15	Did not advance			
Ysaora Thibus	Foil	Walczyk (POL); L 12–15	Did not advance				
Eva Lacheray; Pauline Ranvier; Ysaora Thibus; Anita Blaze (alternate)	Team foil	—N/a		Canada; L 36–38	China; W 45–39	Poland; W 45–44	5
Sara Balzer	Sabre	Daghfous (TUN); W 15–9	Erbil (TUR); W 15–5	Szűcs (HUN); W 15–12	Kharlan (UKR); W 15–7	Apithy-Brunet (FRA); L 12–15	2nd place, silver medalist(s)
Manon Apithy-Brunet	Sabre	Sarybay (KAZ); W 15–12	Yoon (KOR); W 15–9	Gkountoura (GRE); W 15–13	Choi (KOR); W 15–12	Balzer (FRA); W 15–12	1st place, gold medalist(s)
Cécilia Berder	Sabre	Mormile (ITA); W 15–10	Gkountoura (GRE); L 7–15	Did not advance			
Sara Balzer; Manon Apithy-Brunet; Cécilia Berder; Sarah Noutcha (alternate)	Team sabre	—N/a		Algeria; W 45–32	South Korea; L 36–45	Japan; L 40–45	4

== Field hockey ==
Summary

Key:

- FT – After full-time.
- P – Match decided by penalty-shootout.

Team	Event	Group stage						Quarterfinal	Semifinal	Final / BM	
Team	Event	Opposition Score	Opposition Score	Opposition Score	Opposition Score	Opposition Score	Rank	Opposition Score	Opposition Score	Opposition Score	Rank
France men's	Men's tournament	Germany; L 2–8	Netherlands; L 0–4	Spain; D 3–3	Great Britain; L 1–2	South Africa; L 2–5	6	Did not advance			
France women's	Women's tournament	Netherlands; L 2–6	Belgium; L 0–5	Germany; L 1–5	Japan; L 0–1	China; L 1–7	6	Did not advance			

=== Men's tournament ===
As the host nation, the French men's national field hockey team directly qualified for the Olympic tournament.

Team roster

France announced their squad on 8 July 2024.

Head coach: Fred Soyez

No.	Pos.	Player	Date of birth (age)	Caps	Club
1	GK	Arthur Thieffry	15 September 1989 (aged 34)	117	(France) Lille
2	DF	Gaspard Xavier	10 May 2002 (aged 22)	38	(Belgium) Racing Club de Bruxelles
3	DF	Mattéo Desgouillons	21 January 2000 (aged 24)	13	(France) CA Montrouge
7	MF	Lucas Montécot	4 September 2001 (aged 22)	12	(France) CA Montrouge
8	MF	Simon Martin-Brisac	20 November 1992 (aged 31)	148	Racing Club de France
9	FW	Blaise Rogeau	26 November 1994 (aged 29)	108	(Belgium) Waterloo Ducks
10	DF	Viktor Lockwood (Captain)	29 March 1992 (aged 32)	162	(France) Lille
11	FW	Noé Jouin	2 August 2002 (aged 21)	19	(France) Saint Germain
12	DF	Amaury Bellenger	14 August 1998 (aged 25)	70	(Belgium) Uccle Sport
14	MF	Gaspard Baumgarten	3 August 1992 (aged 31)	174	(Belgium) Léopold
16	MF	François Goyet	4 November 1994 (aged 29)	153	(Belgium) Gantoise
17	DF	Christophe Peters-Deutz	17 November 1995 (aged 28)	106	Racing Club de France
18	MF	Eliot Curty	18 September 1998 (aged 25)	65	(Belgium) Waterloo Ducks
21	FW	Etienne Tynevez	13 February 1999 (aged 25)	115	(Belgium) Gantoise
22	DF	Victor Charlet	19 November 1993 (aged 30)	158	(Belgium) Waterloo Ducks
24	MF	Charles Masson	13 April 1992 (aged 32)	143	(Belgium) Gantoise
28	FW	Timothée Clément	8 April 2000 (aged 24)	65	(Belgium) Gantoise
30	DF	Brieuc Delemazure	2 April 2002 (aged 22)	28	(France) Lille

Group play

Pos	Team	Pld	W	D	L	GF	GA	GD	Pts	Qualification
1	Germany	5	4	0	1	16	6	+10	12	Advance to quarter-finals
2	Netherlands	5	3	1	1	16	9	+7	10	Advance to quarter-finals
3	Great Britain	5	2	2	1	11	7	+4	8	Advance to quarter-finals
4	Spain	5	2	1	2	11	12	−1	7	Advance to quarter-finals
5	South Africa	5	1	1	3	11	17	−6	4	
6	France (H)	5	0	1	4	8	22	−14	1	

Source: FIH
Rules for classification: 1) points; 2) matches won; 3) goal difference; 4) goals for; 5) head-to-head result; 6) field goals scored.
(H) Hosts

27 July 2024
17:00
v

Germany	8–2	France
Weigand 1', 44'; Rühr 7'; Prinz 19'; M. Grambusch 21'; T. Grambusch 22'; Wellen 33', 49'	Report	Masson 15+'; Charlet 59'

Pitch 1
Umpires:
Zeke Newman (AUS)
Gareth Greenfield (NZL)

28 July 2024
19:45
v

Netherlands	4–0	France
Reyenga 7'; Bijen 28'; De Geus 31'; Telgenkamp 54'	Report

Pitch 1
Umpires:
Sean Rapaport (RSA)
Irene Presenqui (ARG)

30 July 2024
10:00
v

Spain	3–3	France
Iglesias 28'; Vilallonga 32'; Cunill 51'	Report	Clément 8', 13'; Martin-Brisac 45'

Pitch 1
Umpires:
Lim Hong Zhen (SGP)
Coen van Bunge (NED)

1 August 2024
12:45
v

France	1–2	Great Britain
Clément 30'	Report	Wallace 41'; Albery 54'

Pitch 1
Umpires:
Sean Rapaport (RSA)
David Tomlinson (NZL)

2 August 2024
19:45
v

France	2–5	South Africa
Clément 16'; Charlet 25'	Report	Guise-Brown 2'; Horne 23'; M. Cassiem 56'; D. Cassiem 57', 60'

Pitch 1
Umpires:
Lim Hong Zhen (SGP)
Marcin Grochal (POL)

=== Women's tournament ===
As the host nation, the French women's national field hockey team directly qualified for the Olympic tournament.

Team roster

The squad was announced on 8 July 2024.

Head coach: Gaël Foulard

No.	Pos.	Player	Date of birth (age)	Caps	Goals	Club
3	DF	Catherine Clot	30 April 1997 (aged 27)	24	0	(Netherlands) Almeerse
4	MF	Emma Ponthieu (captain)	9 March 1996 (aged 28)	83	2	(Belgium) Racing
5	FW	Mickaela Lahlah	4 December 2001 (aged 22)	41	1	(France) Cambrai
7	FW	Paola Le Nindre	16 June 2006 (aged 18)	21	5	Racing Club de France
8	FW	Yohanna Lhopital	18 September 1999 (aged 24)	65	21	(Belgium) Waterloo Ducks
10	FW	Philippine Delemazure	10 September 2005 (aged 18)	20	6	(France) Lille
14	MF	Gabrielle Verrier	18 July 1997 (aged 27)	29	3	(Belgium) Royal Evere White Star
17	FW	Victoire Arnaud	26 December 2001 (aged 22)	41	4	(Belgium) Royal Wellington THC
18	DF	Guusje van Bolhuis	6 January 2001 (aged 23)	53	6	(Belgium) Leuven
19	DF	Mathilde Duffrène	19 March 2005 (aged 19)	24	6	(Belgium) Royal Pingouin
22	FW	Eve Verzura	2 April 2002 (aged 22)	45	11	(Belgium) Royal Léopold Club
23	MF	Inès Lardeur	26 March 1996 (aged 28)	93	12	(Belgium) Royal Léopold Club
24	GK	Lucie Ehrmann	31 January 1998 (aged 26)	26	0	(Netherlands) Den Bosch
25	MF	Albane Garot	6 July 1998 (aged 26)	53	1	(Germany) Harvestehuder THC
27	DF	Delfina Gaspari	30 April 1998 (aged 26)	62	6	(Belgium) La Gantoise
28	MF	Tessa-Margot Schubert	9 June 1996 (aged 28)	33	2	(Germany) Düsseldorfer HC
31	GK	Mathilde Petriaux	23 July 1997 (aged 27)	58	0	

Group play

Pos	Team	Pld	W	D	L	GF	GA	GD	Pts	Qualification
1	Netherlands	5	5	0	0	19	5	+14	15	Quarter-finals
2	Belgium	5	4	0	1	13	4	+9	12	Quarter-finals
3	Germany	5	3	0	2	12	7	+5	9	Quarter-finals
4	China	5	2	0	3	15	10	+5	6	Quarter-finals
5	Japan	5	1	0	4	2	15	−13	3	
6	France (H)	5	0	0	5	4	24	−20	0	

Source: FIH
Rules for classification: 1) points; 2) matches won; 3) goal difference; 4) goals for; 5) head-to-head result; 6) field goals scored.
(H) Hosts

27 July 2024
20:15
v

Netherlands	6–2	France
Matla 29'; Jansen 32', 35', 45', 48'; Burg 50'	Report	Lhopital 35'; Le Nindre 46'

Pitch 2
Umpires:
Ayanna McClean (TTO)
Cookie Tan (SGP)

29 July 2024
20:15
v

France	0–5	Belgium
	Report	Rasir 7'; Ballenghien 12', 52'; Gerniers 18'; Vanden Borre 37'

Pitch 2
Umpires:
Liu Xiaoying (CHN)
Raghu Prasad (IND)

31 July 2024
12:45
v

France	1–5	Germany
Lhopital 51'	Report	Lorenz 3', 52', 53'; Stapenhorst 11'; Wortmann 28'

Pitch 1
Umpires:
Annelize Rostron (RSA)
Emi Yamada (JPN)

1 August 2024
19:45
v

Japan	1–0	France
Toriyama 12'

Pitch 1
Umpires:
Rachel Williams (GBR)
Aleisha Neumann (AUS)

3 August 2024
17:00
v

China	7–1	France
Li 9', 25'; Chen Ya. 16', 55'; Zhong 33'; Zhang 41'; Dan 48'	Report	Delemazure 22'

Pitch 1
Umpires:
Alison Keogh (IRE)
Aleisha Neumann (AUS)

== Football ==
Summary

Key:

- A.E.T – After extra time.
- P – Match decided by penalty-shootout.

Team	Event	Group stage				Quarterfinal	Semifinal	Final / BM	
Team	Event	Opposition Score	Opposition Score	Opposition Score	Rank	Opposition Score	Opposition Score	Opposition Score	Rank
France men's	Men's tournament	United States; W 3–0	Guinea; W 1–0	New Zealand; W 3–0	1 Q	Argentina; W 1–0	Egypt; W 3–1 (a.e.t)	Spain; L 3–5 (a.e.t)	2nd place, silver medalist(s)
France women's	Women's tournament	Colombia; W 3–2	Canada; L 1–2	New Zealand; W 2–1	1 Q	Brazil; L 0–1	Did not advance		

=== Men's tournament ===
As the host nation, the French men's football team directly qualified for the Olympic tournament.

Team roster

France announced a 25-men preliminary squad on 3 June 2024. Lucas Chevalier, Bafodé Diakité, Leny Yoro, Warren Zaïre-Emery, Bradley Barcola and Mathys Tel withdrew from the squad due to their club's refusal to release them and were replaced by Chrislain Matsima, Andy Diouf and Rayan Cherki on 11 June 2024. A week later, Maxime Estève withdrew and was replaced by Loïc Badé. On 26 June, Robin Risser withdrew injured and was replaced by Théo De Percin. In the same day, Soungoutou Magassa was added to the squad. On 3 July, Khéphren Thuram withdrew due to his new club's refusal to ultimately release him. The final squad was announced on 4 July. Lesley Ugochukwu withdrew on 21 July after being recalled by his club and was replaced by Johann Lepenant in the alternative list.

Head coach: Thierry Henry

No.	Pos.	Player	Date of birth (age)	Caps	Goals	Club
1	GK	Obed Nkambadio	7 February 2003 (aged 21)	1	0	(French Football Federation) Paris FC
2	DF	Castello Lukeba	17 December 2002 (aged 21)	2	0	(German Football Association) RB Leipzig
3	DF	Adrien Truffert	20 November 2001 (aged 22)	3	0	(French Football Federation) Rennes
4	DF	Loïc Badé*	11 April 2000 (aged 24)	0	0	(Royal Spanish Football Federation) Sevilla
5	DF	Kiliann Sildillia	16 May 2002 (aged 22)	3	0	(German Football Association) SC Freiburg
6	MF	Manu Koné	17 May 2001 (aged 23)	3	0	(German Football Association) Borussia Mönchengladbach
7	FW	Michael Olise	12 December 2001 (aged 22)	1	0	(The Football Association) Crystal Palace
8	MF	Maghnes Akliouche	25 February 2002 (aged 22)	2	0	(French Football Federation) Monaco
9	FW	Arnaud Kalimuendo	20 January 2002 (aged 22)	2	2	(French Football Federation) Rennes
10	FW	Alexandre Lacazette* (captain)	28 May 1991 (aged 33)	1	0	(French Football Federation) Lyon
11	MF	Désiré Doué	3 June 2005 (aged 19)	3	2	(French Football Federation) Rennes
12	MF	Enzo Millot	17 July 2002 (aged 22)	2	0	(German Football Association) VfB Stuttgart
13	MF	Joris Chotard	24 September 2001 (aged 22)	1	0	(French Football Federation) Montpellier
14	FW	Jean-Philippe Mateta*	28 June 1997 (aged 27)	1	2	(The Football Association) Crystal Palace
15	DF	Bradley Locko	6 May 2002 (aged 22)	2	0	(French Football Federation) Brest
16	GK	Guillaume Restes	11 March 2005 (aged 19)	2	0	(French Football Federation) Toulouse
17	DF	Soungoutou Magassa	8 October 2003 (aged 20)	1	0	(French Football Federation) Monaco
18	FW	Rayan Cherki	17 August 2003 (aged 20)	3	1	(French Football Federation) Lyon
19	DF	Chrislain Matsima	19 May 2002 (aged 22)	1	0	(French Football Federation) Clermont
20	MF	Andy Diouf	17 May 2003 (aged 21)	2	1	(French Football Federation) Lens
21	MF	Johann Lepenant	22 October 2002 (aged 21)	0	0	(French Football Federation) Lyon

* Overage player.

Group play

Pos	Team	Pld	W	D	L	GF	GA	GD	Pts	Qualification
1	France (H)	3	3	0	0	7	0	+7	9	Advance to knockout stage
2	United States	3	2	0	1	7	4	+3	6	Advance to knockout stage
3	New Zealand	3	1	0	2	3	8	−5	3	
4	Guinea	3	0	0	3	1	6	−5	0	

Source: FIFA
Rules for classification: Group stage tiebreakers
(H) Hosts
24 July 2024
21:00

France	3–0	United States
Lacazette 61'; Olise 69'; Badé 85'	Report

Stade de Marseille, Marseille
Attendance: 48,721
Referee: Yael Falcón (Argentina)

27 July 2024
21:00

France	1–0	Guinea
Sildillia 75'	Report

Stade de Nice, Nice
Attendance: 25,965
Referee: Ilgiz Tantashev (Uzbekistan)

30 July 2024
19:00

New Zealand	0–3	France
	Report	Mateta 19'; Doué 71'; Kalimuendo 74'

Stade de Marseille, Marseille
Attendance: 45,790
Referee: Katia García (Mexico)

Quarter-finals

2 August 2024
21:00

France	1–0	Argentina
Mateta 5'	Report

Stade de Bordeaux, Bordeaux
Attendance: 37,153
Referee: Ilgiz Tantashev (Uzbekistan)

Semi-finals

5 August 2024
21:00

France	3–1 (a.e.t.)	Egypt
Mateta 83', 99'; Olise 108'	Report	Saber 62'

Stade de Lyon, Décines-Charpieu
Attendance: 47,530
Referee: Saíd Martínez (Honduras)

Gold medal match

9 August 2024
18:00

France	3–5 (a.e.t.)	Spain
Millot 11'; Akliouche 79'; Mateta 90+3' (pen.)	Report	López 18', 25'; Baena 28'; Camello 100', 120+1'

Parc des Princes, Paris
Attendance: 44,260
Referee: Ramon Abatti (Brazil)

=== Women's tournament ===
As the host nation, the French women's football team directly qualified for the Olympic tournament.

Team roster

France named a squad of 18 players and 4 alternates for the tournament on 8 July 2024.

Head coach: Hervé Renard

No.	Pos.	Player	Date of birth (age)	Caps	Goals	Club
1	GK	Constance Picaud	5 July 1998 (aged 26)	7	0	(French Football Federation) Paris Saint-Germain
2	DF	Maëlle Lakrar	27 May 2000 (aged 24)	18	3	(French Football Federation) Montpellier
3	DF	Wendie Renard (captain)	20 July 1990 (aged 34)	160	38	(French Football Federation) Lyon
4	DF	Estelle Cascarino	5 February 1997 (aged 27)	16	1	(Italian Football Federation) Juventus
5	DF	Élisa De Almeida	11 January 1998 (aged 26)	34	4	(French Football Federation) Paris Saint-Germain
6	MF	Amandine Henry	28 September 1989 (aged 34)	106	14	(United States Soccer Federation) Utah Royals
7	DF	Sakina Karchaoui	26 January 1996 (aged 28)	75	2	(French Football Federation) Paris Saint-Germain
8	MF	Grace Geyoro	2 July 1997 (aged 27)	82	18	(French Football Federation) Paris Saint-Germain
9	FW	Eugénie Le Sommer	18 May 1989 (aged 35)	192	93	(French Football Federation) Lyon
10	FW	Delphine Cascarino	5 February 1997 (aged 27)	64	14	(French Football Federation) Lyon
11	FW	Kadidiatou Diani	1 April 1995 (aged 29)	101	29	(French Football Federation) Lyon
12	FW	Marie-Antoinette Katoto	1 November 1998 (aged 25)	41	30	(French Football Federation) Paris Saint-Germain
13	DF	Selma Bacha	9 November 2000 (aged 23)	32	2	(French Football Federation) Lyon
14	MF	Sandie Toletti	13 July 1995 (aged 29)	56	3	(Royal Spanish Football Federation) Real Madrid
15	MF	Kenza Dali	31 July 1991 (aged 32)	68	12	(The Football Association) Aston Villa
16	GK	Pauline Peyraud-Magnin	17 March 1992 (aged 32)	54	0	(Italian Football Federation) Juventus
17	FW	Sandy Baltimore	19 February 2000 (aged 24)	30	3	(French Football Federation) Paris Saint-Germain
18	DF	Griedge Mbock Bathy	26 February 1995 (aged 29)	81	8	(French Football Federation) Lyon
20	FW	Vicki Bècho	3 October 2003 (aged 20)	16	2	(French Football Federation) Lyon
21	DF	Ève Périsset	24 December 1994 (aged 29)	60	4	(The Football Association) Chelsea

Group play

Pos	Team	Pld	W	D	L	GF	GA	GD	Pts	Qualification
1	France (H)	3	2	0	1	6	5	+1	6	Advance to knockout stage
2	Canada	3	3	0	0	5	2	+3	3 (Note: On 27 July 2024, Canada was penalized 6 points by FIFA for their coaching staff's involvement in illegal drone spying at an official training venue. The decision was upheld by CAS on 31 July.)	Advance to knockout stage
3	Colombia	3	1	0	2	4	4	0	3	Advance to knockout stage
4	New Zealand	3	0	0	3	2	6	−4	0	

Source: FIFA
(H) Hosts
Notes:
25 July 2024
21:00

France	3–2	Colombia
Katoto 6', 42'; Dali 18'	Report	Usme 54' (pen.); Paví 64'

Stade de Lyon, Décines-Charpieu
Attendance: 29,208
Referee: Tori Penso (United States)

28 July 2024
21:00

France	1–2	Canada
Katoto 42'	Report	Fleming 58'; Gilles 90+12'

Stade Geoffroy-Guichard, Saint-Étienne
Attendance: 17,550
Referee: Bouchra Karboubi (Morocco)

31 July 2024
21:00

New Zealand	1–2	France
Taylor 43'	Report	Katoto 22', 49'

Stade de Lyon, Décines-Charpieu
Attendance: 21,946
Referee: Edina Alves Batista (Brazil)

Quarter-finals

3 August 2024
21:00

France	0–1	Brazil
	Report	Gabi Portilho 82'

Stade de la Beaujoire, Nantes
Attendance: 32,280
Referee: Tori Penso (United States)

== Golf ==
France qualified four golfers through the Olympic rankings.

Athlete	Event	Round 1	Round 2	Round 3	Round 4	Total		
Athlete	Event	Score	Score	Score	Score	Score	Par	Rank
Victor Perez	Men's individual	70	67	68	63	268	−16	4
Matthieu Pavon	Men's individual	71	75	77	74	297	+13	58
Céline Boutier	Women's individual	65	76	71	74	286	−2	T18
Perrine Delacour	Women's individual	79	78	74	66	297	+9	T42

== Gymnastics ==
=== Artistic ===
As the host nation, France automatically received one guaranteed place in the men's and women's artistic gymnastics events. France qualified a full women's team at the 2023 World Artistic Gymnastics Championships. Samir Aït Saïd qualified on the rings with his results in the 2024 FIG Artistic Gymnastics World Cup series. The final selection for the women's team was made on 7 July 2024.

Men

Athlete	Event	Qualification								Final							
Athlete	Event	Apparatus						Total	Rank	Apparatus						Total	Rank
Athlete	Event	F	PH	R	V	PB	HB	Total	Rank	F	PH	R	V	PB	HB	Total	Rank
Samir Aït Saïd	Rings	—N/a		14.966	—N/a			14.966	3 Q	—N/a		15.000	—N/a			15.000	4

Women
Team

Athlete	Event	Qualification						Final					
Athlete	Event	Apparatus				Total	Rank	Apparatus				Total	Rank
Athlete	Event	VT	UB	BB	FX	Total	Rank	VT	UB	BB	FX	Total	Rank
Marine Boyer	Team	—N/a	13.200	13.766	12.833	—N/a		Did not qualify				—N/a	
Mélanie de Jesus dos Santos	Team	14.200	12.233	12.366	12.700	51.499	33	Did not qualify				—N/a	
Coline Devillard	Team	13.650	—N/a	10.866	—N/a	—N/a		Did not qualify				—N/a	
Morgane Osyssek	Team	13.300	11.600	13.533	12.033	50.466	48	Did not qualify				—N/a	
Ming van Eijken	Team	13.783	13.033	—N/a	12.500	—N/a		Did not qualify				—N/a	
Total	Team	42.633	38.446	39.665	38.033	158.797	11	Did not qualify				—N/a	

=== Rhythmic ===
As the host nation, France automatically received a guaranteed place in the individual and group all-around competitions. Hélène Karbanov was named as the individual on 14 June 2024. The group competitors were named on 28 June 2024.

Athlete	Event	Qualification						Final					
Athlete	Event	Hoop	Ball	Clubs	Ribbon	Total	Rank	Hoop	Ball	Clubs	Ribbon	Total	Rank
Hélène Karbanov	Individual	30.500	32.350	28.650	29.650	121.150	17	Did not advance					

Athletes	Event	Qualification				Final			
Athletes	Event	5 apps	3+2 apps	Total	Rank	5 apps	3+2 apps	Total	Rank
Aïnhoa Dot-Espinosa; Manelle Inaho; Célia Joseph-Noël; Justine Lavit; Lozéa Vilarino	Group	36.600	32.200	68.800	4 Q	35.750	30.250	66.000	6

=== Trampoline ===
As the host nation, France automatically received one guaranteed place in the men's and women's trampoline events. The athletes were selected on 3 May 2024.

Athlete	Event	Qualification		Final	
Athlete	Event	Score	Rank	Score	Rank
Pierre Gouzou	Men's	59.100	6 Q	58.940	6
Léa Labrousse	Women's	53.220	12	Did not advance	

== Handball ==
Summary

Key:

- ET: After extra time
- P – Match decided by penalty-shootout.

Team	Event	Group stage						Quarterfinal	Semifinal	Final / BM	
Team	Event	Opposition Score	Opposition Score	Opposition Score	Opposition Score	Opposition Score	Rank	Opposition Score	Opposition Score	Opposition Score	Rank
France men's	Men's tournament	Denmark; L 29–37	Norway; L 22–27	Egypt; D 26–26	Argentina; W 28–21	Hungary; W 24–20	4 Q	Germany; L 34–35^{ET}	Did not advance		8
France women's	Women's tournament	Hungary; W 31–28	Netherlands; W 32–28	Brazil; W 26–20	Angola; W 38–24	Spain; W 32–24	1 Q	Germany; W 26–23	Sweden; W 31–28^{ET}	Norway; L 21–29	2nd place, silver medalist(s)

=== Men's tournament ===
As the host nation, the French men's national handball team directly qualified for the Olympic tournament.

Team roster

A 21-player roster was announced on 10 June 2024. The final squad was named on 8 July 2024.

Head coach: Guillaume Gille

No.	Pos.	Name	Date of birth (age)	Height	App.	Goals	Club
2	RW	Yanis Lenne	29 June 1996 (aged 28)	1.88 m	56	111	(France) Montpellier Handball
4	CB	Aymeric Minne	18 July 1995 (aged 29)	1.95 m	127	389	(Hungary) Telekom Veszprém
5	CB	Nedim Remili	18 July 1995 (aged 29)	1.95 m	127	389	(Hungary) Telekom Veszprém
8	LB	Elohim Prandi	24 August 1998 (aged 25)	1.93 m	39	94	(France) Paris Saint-Germain
9	RB	Melvyn Richardson	31 January 1997 (aged 27)	1.90 m	87	208	(Spain) Barça
10	RB	Dika Mem	31 August 1997 (aged 26)	1.94 m	117	399	(Spain) Barça
11	P	Nicolas Tournat	5 April 1994 (aged 30)	2.00 m	96	219	(France) HBC Nantes
12	GK	Vincent Gérard	16 December 1986 (aged 37)	1.89 m	152	18	(France) Istres Provence
13	LB	Nikola Karabatić	11 April 1984 (aged 40)	1.96 m	357	1294	Not attached
22	P	Luka Karabatić	19 April 1988 (aged 36)	2.02 m	154	174	(France) Paris Saint-Germain
23	P	Ludovic Fabregas	1 July 1996 (aged 28)	1.98 m	141	344	(Hungary) Telekom Veszprém
25	LW	Hugo Descat	16 August 1992 (aged 31)	1.83 m	58	244	(Hungary) Telekom Veszprém
28	RW	Valentin Porte	7 September 1990 (aged 33)	1.90 m	190	425	(France) Montpellier Handball
31	LW	Dylan Nahi	30 November 1999 (aged 24)	1.92 m	57	155	(Poland) Industria Kielce
34	P	Karl Konan	3 June 1995 (aged 29)	1.96 m	34	6	(France) Montpellier Handball
92	GK	Rémi Desbonnet	28 February 1992 (aged 32)	1.82 m	40	4	(France) Montpellier Handball

Group play

Pos	Team	Pld	W	D	L	GF	GA	GD	Pts	Qualification
1	Denmark	5	5	0	0	165	133	+32	10	Quarterfinals
2	Egypt	5	3	1	1	148	140	+8	7	Quarterfinals
3	Norway	5	3	0	2	139	136	+3	6	Quarterfinals
4	France (H)	5	2	1	2	129	131	−2	5	Quarterfinals
5	Hungary	5	1	0	4	137	138	−1	2	
6	Argentina	5	0	0	5	131	171	−40	0	

Source: Olympics Paris 2024 rankings
Rules for classification: 1) Points; 2) Head-to-head points; 3) Head-to-head goal difference; 4) Head-to-head goals scored; 5) Goal difference; 6) Goals scored; 7) Draw.
(H) Hosts

27 July 2024; 21:00	Denmark	37–29	France	Paris Expo Porte de Versailles, Paris; Attendance: 5,739; Referees: Schulze, Tönnies (GER)
27 July 2024; 21:00	Gidsel, Pytlick 11	(18–17)	Descat 7	Paris Expo Porte de Versailles, Paris; Attendance: 5,739; Referees: Schulze, Tönnies (GER)
27 July 2024; 21:00	1× (yellow card)	Report	1× (yellow card) 4× (suspension)	Paris Expo Porte de Versailles, Paris; Attendance: 5,739; Referees: Schulze, Tönnies (GER)

29 July 2024; 19:00	France	22–27	Norway	Paris Expo Porte de Versailles, Paris; Attendance: 5,602; Referees: García, Marín (ESP)
29 July 2024; 19:00	Mem 10	(11–16)	Blonz 7	Paris Expo Porte de Versailles, Paris; Attendance: 5,602; Referees: García, Marín (ESP)
29 July 2024; 19:00	1× (yellow card) 1× (suspension)	Report	2× (suspension)	Paris Expo Porte de Versailles, Paris; Attendance: 5,602; Referees: García, Marín (ESP)

31 July 2024; 19:00	France	26–26	Egypt	Paris Expo Porte de Versailles, Paris; Attendance: 5,780; Referees: Kurtagic, Wetterwik (SWE)
31 July 2024; 19:00	Fabregas 5	(11–15)	Omar 8	Paris Expo Porte de Versailles, Paris; Attendance: 5,780; Referees: Kurtagic, Wetterwik (SWE)
31 July 2024; 19:00	3× (suspension)	Report	2× (suspension)	Paris Expo Porte de Versailles, Paris; Attendance: 5,780; Referees: Kurtagic, Wetterwik (SWE)

2 August 2024; 11:00	Argentina	21–28	France	Paris Expo Porte de Versailles, Paris; Attendance: 5,764; Referees: Pavićević, Ražnatović (MNE)
2 August 2024; 11:00	Parker 7	(8–15)	Descat 8	Paris Expo Porte de Versailles, Paris; Attendance: 5,764; Referees: Pavićević, Ražnatović (MNE)
2 August 2024; 11:00	4× (suspension)	Report	1× (yellow card) 1× (suspension)	Paris Expo Porte de Versailles, Paris; Attendance: 5,764; Referees: Pavićević, Ražnatović (MNE)

4 August 2024; 16:00	Hungary	20–24	France	Paris Expo Porte de Versailles, Paris; Attendance: 5,685; Referees: Hansen, Madsen (DEN)
4 August 2024; 16:00	Imre 6	(8–11)	Prandi 7	Paris Expo Porte de Versailles, Paris; Attendance: 5,685; Referees: Hansen, Madsen (DEN)
4 August 2024; 16:00		Report	1× (yellow card) 2× (suspension)	Paris Expo Porte de Versailles, Paris; Attendance: 5,685; Referees: Hansen, Madsen (DEN)

Quarterfinal

7 August 2024
13:30
Germany
35–34 (ET)
France
Stade Pierre-Mauroy, Lille
Attendance: 27,014
Referees: Hansen, Madsen (DEN)
Uščins 14
(14–17)
Mem 10
3× (suspension)
Report
1× (yellow card) 6× (suspension)

FT: 29–29 ET: 6–5

=== Women's tournament ===
As the host nation, the French women's national handball team directly qualified for the Olympic tournament.

Team roster

A 21-player squad was announced on 17 May 2024. The final squad was announced on 8 July 2024. On 29 July, Grâce Zaadi and Cléopatre Darleux replaced Méline Nocandy and Hatadou Sako and on 31 July, Oriane Ondono replaced Sarah Bouktit.

Head coach: Olivier Krumbholz

No.	Pos.	Name	Date of birth (age)	Height	App.	Goals	Club
1	GK	Laura Glauser	20 August 1993 (aged 30)	1.80 m	124	1	(Hungary) Ferencvárosi TC
2	CB	Méline Nocandy	25 February 1998 (aged 26)	1.73 m	74	143	(France) Brest Bretagne Handball
3	RW	Alicia Toublanc	3 May 1996 (aged 28)	1.69 m	50	156	(Romania) SCM Râmnicu Vâlcea
6	LW	Chloé Valentini	19 April 1995 (aged 29)	1.65 m	90	258	(France) Metz Handball
8	LW	Coralie Lassource	1 September 1992 (aged 31)	1.67 m	92	164	(France) Brest Bretagne Handball
10	CB	Grâce Zaadi	7 July 1993 (aged 31)	1.71 m	184	364	(Romania) CSM București
16	GK	Cléopatre Darleux	1 July 1989 (aged 34)	1.76 m	200	5	Unknown
20	RB	Laura Flippes	13 December 1994 (aged 29)	1.71 m	133	265	(France) Metz Handball
21	LB	Orlane Kanor	16 June 1997 (aged 27)	1.74 m	90	189	(Hungary) Ferencvárosi TC
22	CB	Tamara Horacek	5 November 1995 (aged 28)	1.78 m	87	161	(Slovenia) RK Krim
26	P	Pauletta Foppa	22 December 2000 (aged 23)	1.77 m	88	224	(France) Brest Bretagne Handball
27	LB	Estelle Nze Minko	11 August 1991 (aged 32)	1.78 m	187	454	(Hungary) Győri ETO KC
29	P	Oriane Ondono	14 April 1996 (aged 28)	1.80 m	29	31	(France) Brest Bretagne Handball
31	RW	Lucie Granier	11 May 1999 (aged 25)	1.67 m	46	101	(France) Metz Handball
32	P	Sarah Bouktit	27 August 2002 (aged 21)	1.79 m	26	54	(France) Metz Handball
34	CB	Léna Grandveau	21 January 2003 (aged 21)	1.70 m	25	43	(France) Neptunes de Nantes
99	GK	Hatadou Sako	21 October 1995 (aged 28)	1.74 m	21	0	(Hungary) Győri ETO KC

Group play

Pos	Team	Pld	W	D	L	GF	GA	GD	Pts	Qualification
1	France (H)	5	5	0	0	159	124	+35	10	Quarterfinals
2	Netherlands	5	4	0	1	152	137	+15	8	Quarterfinals
3	Hungary	5	2	1	2	137	140	−3	5	Quarterfinals
4	Brazil	5	2	0	3	127	119	+8	4	Quarterfinals
5	Angola	5	1	1	3	131	154	−23	3	
6	Spain	5	0	0	5	111	143	−32	0	

Source: Olympics Paris 2024 rankings
Rules for classification: 1) Points; 2) Head-to-head points; 3) Head-to-head goal difference; 4) Head-to-head goals scored; 5) Goal difference; 6) Goals scored; 7) Draw.
(H) Hosts

25 July 2024; 19:00	Hungary	28–31	France	Paris Expo Porte de Versailles, Paris; Attendance: 5,808; Referees: García, Paolantoni (ARG)
25 July 2024; 19:00	Kuczora 8	(12–15)	Nze Minko 6	Paris Expo Porte de Versailles, Paris; Attendance: 5,808; Referees: García, Paolantoni (ARG)
25 July 2024; 19:00	1× (suspension)	Report	1× (yellow card) 2× (suspension)	Paris Expo Porte de Versailles, Paris; Attendance: 5,808; Referees: García, Paolantoni (ARG)

28 July 2024; 21:00	France	32–28	Netherlands	Paris Expo Porte de Versailles, Paris; Attendance: 5,748; Referees: Lah, Sok (SLO)
28 July 2024; 21:00	Valentini 10	(17–14)	Malestein 7	Paris Expo Porte de Versailles, Paris; Attendance: 5,748; Referees: Lah, Sok (SLO)
28 July 2024; 21:00	2× (suspension)	Report	2× (suspension)	Paris Expo Porte de Versailles, Paris; Attendance: 5,748; Referees: Lah, Sok (SLO)

30 July 2024; 19:00	France	26–20	Brazil	Paris Expo Porte de Versailles, Paris; Attendance: 5,724; Referees: Kuttler, Merz (GER)
30 July 2024; 19:00	Foppa 7	(14–11)	De Paula 7	Paris Expo Porte de Versailles, Paris; Attendance: 5,724; Referees: Kuttler, Merz (GER)
30 July 2024; 19:00	2× (suspension)	Report	3× (suspension)	Paris Expo Porte de Versailles, Paris; Attendance: 5,724; Referees: Kuttler, Merz (GER)

1 August 2024; 16:00	Angola	24–38	France	Paris Expo Porte de Versailles, Paris; Attendance: 5,816; Referees: Jørum, Kleven (NOR)
1 August 2024; 16:00	three players 5	(14–18)	Kanor 7	Paris Expo Porte de Versailles, Paris; Attendance: 5,816; Referees: Jørum, Kleven (NOR)
1 August 2024; 16:00	2× (suspension) 1× (red card)	Report	1× (suspension)	Paris Expo Porte de Versailles, Paris; Attendance: 5,816; Referees: Jørum, Kleven (NOR)

3 August 2024; 11:00	Spain	24–32	France	Paris Expo Porte de Versailles, Paris; Attendance: 5,841; Referees: Kuttler, Merz (GER)
3 August 2024; 11:00	Cabral 5	(9–17)	Toublanc 6	Paris Expo Porte de Versailles, Paris; Attendance: 5,841; Referees: Kuttler, Merz (GER)
3 August 2024; 11:00	1× (yellow card) 4× (suspension)	Report	1× (suspension)	Paris Expo Porte de Versailles, Paris; Attendance: 5,841; Referees: Kuttler, Merz (GER)

Quarterfinals

6 August 2024; 13:30	France	26–23	Germany	Stade Pierre-Mauroy, Lille; Attendance: 26,548; Referees: Jørum, Kleven (NOR)
6 August 2024; 13:30	Horacek 7	(13–10)	Bölk 7	Stade Pierre-Mauroy, Lille; Attendance: 26,548; Referees: Jørum, Kleven (NOR)
6 August 2024; 13:30	1× (yellow card) 1× (suspension)	Report	2× (suspension)	Stade Pierre-Mauroy, Lille; Attendance: 26,548; Referees: Jørum, Kleven (NOR)

Semifinal

8 August 2024
16:30
Sweden
28–31 (ET)
France
Stade Pierre-Mauroy, Lille
Attendance: 24,688
Referees: Kuttler, Merz (GER)
Hagman 6
(12–10)
Horacek 8
3× (suspension)
Report
1× (yellow card) 5× (suspension)

FT: 25–25 ET: 3–6

Gold medal game

10 August 2024; 15:00	Norway	29–21	France	Stade Pierre-Mauroy, Lille; Attendance: 26,664; Referees: García, Marín (ESP)
10 August 2024; 15:00	Reistad 8	(15–13)	Kanor 5	Stade Pierre-Mauroy, Lille; Attendance: 26,664; Referees: García, Marín (ESP)
10 August 2024; 15:00	3× (suspension)	Report	1× (yellow card)	Stade Pierre-Mauroy, Lille; Attendance: 26,664; Referees: García, Marín (ESP)

== Judo ==
As the host nation, French judoka received fourteen quota places (seven in each gender) at their disposal for the Games. Judoka were named throughout the beginning of 2024.

Men

Athlete	Event	Round of 64	Round of 32	Round of 16	Quarterfinals	Semifinals	Repechage	Final / BM	
Athlete	Event	Opposition Result	Opposition Result	Opposition Result	Opposition Result	Opposition Result	Opposition Result	Opposition Result	Rank
Luka Mkheidze	–60 kg	—N/a	Bye	Enkhtaivany (MGL); W 10–00	Kim W-j (KOR); W 01–00	Yıldız (TUR); W 01–00	—N/a	Smetov (KAZ); L 00–01	2nd place, silver medalist(s)
Walide Khyar	–66 kg	—N/a	Rashnonezhad (EOR); W 10–00	Margvelashvili (GEO); W 10–00	Kyrgyzbayev (KAZ); L 00–10	—N/a	Baskhüü (MGL); W 01–00	Vieru (MDA); L 00–01	5
Joan-Benjamin Gaba	–73 kg	—N/a	Bye	Mlugu (TAN); W 10–00	Hashimoto (JPN); W 10–00	Osmanov (MDA); W 10–00	—N/a	Heydarov (AZE); L 00–10	2nd place, silver medalist(s)
Alpha Oumar Djalo	–81 kg	Abdelghany (EGY); W 01–00	Tckaev (AZE); W 10–00	Boltaboev (UZB); L 00–10	Did not advance				
Maxime-Gaël Ngayap	–90 kg	—N/a	Klammert (CZE); W 10–00	Hajiyev (AZE); W 10–00	Tselidis (GRE); W 01–00	Murao (JPN); L 00–11	—N/a	Macedo (BRA); W 10–00	3rd place, bronze medalist(s)
Aurélien Diesse	–100 kg	—N/a	Madzhidov (TJK); W 10–00	Paltchik (ISR); L 00–10	Did not advance				
Teddy Riner	+100 kg	—N/a	Bye	Magomedomarov (UAE); W 10–00	Tushishvili (GEO); W 10–00	Rakhimov (TJK); W 10–00	—N/a	Kim M-j (KOR); W 10–00	1st place, gold medalist(s)

Women

Athlete	Event	Round of 32	Round of 16	Quarterfinals	Semifinals	Repechage	Final / BM	
Athlete	Event	Opposition Result	Opposition Result	Opposition Result	Opposition Result	Opposition Result	Opposition Result	Rank
Shirine Boukli	–48 kg	Beder (TUR); W 10–00	Bedioui (TUN); W 10–00	Tsunoda (JPN); L 00–10	Did not advance	Scutto (ITA); W 01–00	Martínez (ESP); W 01–00	3rd place, bronze medalist(s)
Amandine Buchard	–52 kg	Bye	Asvesta (CYP); W 10–00	Pimenta (BRA); W 01–00	Keldiyorova (UZB); L 00–01	—N/a	Pupp (HUN); W 01–00	3rd place, bronze medalist(s)
Sarah-Léonie Cysique	–57 kg	Bye	Esteves (GUI); W 10–00	Funakubo (JPN); W 10–00	Deguchi (CAN); L 00–10	—N/a	Liparteliani (GEO); W 11–00	3rd place, bronze medalist(s)
Clarisse Agbegnenou	–63 kg	Sharir (ISR); W 01–00	Quadros (BRA); W 01–00	Fazliu (KOS); W 10–00	Leški (SLO); L 00–01	—N/a	Piovesana (AUT); W 10–00	3rd place, bronze medalist(s)
Marie-Ève Gahié	–70 kg	Bye	Goshen (ISR); W 10–00	Polleres (AUT); L 00–10	Did not advance	Willems (BEL); L 00–10	Did not advance	
Madeleine Malonga	–78 kg	Bye	Sampaio (POR); L 00–11	Did not advance				
Romane Dicko	+78 kg	Bye	Somkhishvili (GEO); W 10–00	Cerić (BIH); W 10–00	Souza (BRA); L 00–10	—N/a	Žabić (SRB); W 10–00	3rd place, bronze medalist(s)

Mixed

Nations qualifying at least one athlete in the −57 (−48, −52 & −57), −70 (−57, −63 & −70) & +70 (−70, −78 & +78) weight categories for women, and at least one athlete in the −73 (−60, −66 & −73), −90 (−73, −81 & −90) & +90 (−90, −100 & +100) weight categories for men, would compete in the team event.

Athlete	Event	Round of 32	Round of 16	Quarterfinals	Semifinals	Repechage	Final / BM	
Athlete	Event	Opposition Result	Opposition Result	Opposition Result	Opposition Result	Opposition Result	Opposition Result	Rank
Shirine Boukli; Joan-Benjamin Gaba; Amandine Buchard; Walide Khyar; Sarah-Léonie Cysique; Luka Mkheidze; Clarisse Agbegnenou; Alpha Oumar Djalo; Marie-Ève Gahié; Maxime-Gaël Ngayap Hambou; Romane Dicko; Aurélien Diesse; Madeleine Malonga; Teddy Riner	Team	Bye	Israel; W 4–0	South Korea; W 4–1	Italy; W 4–1	—N/a	Japan; W 4–3	1st place, gold medalist(s)

== Modern pentathlon ==
French modern pentathletes confirmed four quota places (two per gender) for Paris 2024. Tokyo 2020 Olympian Marie Oteiza, with Valentin Prades slated to compete at his third straight Games on the men's side, secured a spot each in their respective individual events by finishing among the eight highest-ranked modern pentathletes eligible for qualification at the 2023 European Games in Kraków, Poland. Pentathletes were named on 21 June 2024.

Athlete	Event	Fencing ranking round (épée one touch)			Semifinal													Final												
Athlete	Event	Fencing ranking round (épée one touch)			Fencing	Swimming (200 m freestyle)			Riding (show jumping)				Shooting / Running (10 m laser pistol / 3000 m cross-country)			Total points	Final rank	Fencing	Swimming			Riding				Shooting / Running			Total points	Final rank
Athlete	Event	V–D	Rank	MP points	BR	Time	Rank	MP points	Time	Penalties	Rank	MP points	Time	Rank	MP points	Total points	Final rank	BR	Time	Rank	MP points	Time	Penalties	Rank	MP points	Time	Rank	MP points	Total points	Final rank
Jean-Baptiste Mourcia	Men's	16–19	23	205	2	2:09.07	18	292	59.28	7	8	293	9:48.28	2	712	1504	7 Q	0	2:10.05	18	290	58.67	0	3	300	9:43.94	2	717	1512	11
Valentin Prades	Men's	20–15	11	225	10	2:07.25	14	296	57.21	7	10	293	10:24.18	14	676	1500	9 Q	2	2:07.07	17	296	59.17	28	17	272	10:25.43	15	675	1470	16
Élodie Clouvel	Women's	27–8	1	260	4	2:12.74	3	285	61.01	14	15	286	12:17.92	14	563	1398	1 Q	4	2:11.64	3	287	60.71	7	9	293	11:32.35	14	608	1452	2nd place, silver medalist(s)
Marie Oteiza	Women's	21–14	6	230	2	2:15.92	8	279	58.11	0	5	300	11:56.83	12	584	1395	7 Q	0	2:16.84	8	277	EL		17	0	12:10.05	18	570	1077	18

== Rowing ==
French rowers qualified boats in each of the following classes through the 2023 World Rowing Championships in Belgrade, Serbia, and the 2024 Final Qualification Regatta in Luzern, Switzerland. The selection was officialized on 5 June 2024.

Men

Athlete	Event	Heats		Repechage		Semifinals		Final	
Athlete	Event	Time	Rank	Time	Rank	Time	Rank	Time	Rank
Hugo Boucheron; Matthieu Androdias	Men's double sculls	6:18.69	3 SA/B	Bye		6:19.35	4 FB	6:15.28	8
Hugo Beurey; Ferdinan Ludwig	Men's lightweight double sculls	6:31.32	3 R	6:50.98	2 SA/B	6:26.60	4 FB	6:19.73	7
Benoît Brunet; Téo Rayet; Guillaume Turlan; Thibaud Turlan; Valentin Onfroy (alternate)	Men's coxless four	6:07.52	3 R	5:53.59	3 FB	—N/a		5:57.78	8

Women

Athlete	Event	Heats		Repechage		Semifinals		Final	
Athlete	Event	Time	Rank	Time	Rank	Time	Rank	Time	Rank
Emma Lunatti; Élodie Ravera-Scaramozzino	Women's double sculls	6:48.89	1 SA/B	Bye		6:51.30	3 FA	6:57.35	5
Claire Bové; Laura Tarantola	Women's Lightweight double sculls	7:03.25	2 SA/B	Bye		7:03.22	4 FB	7:03.24	7

Qualification Legend: FA=Final A (medal); FB=Final B (non-medal); FC=Final C (non-medal); FD=Final D (non-medal); FE=Final E (non-medal); FF=Final F (non-medal); SA/B=Semifinals A/B; SC/D=Semifinals C/D; SE/F=Semifinals E/F; QF=Quarterfinals; R=Repechage

== Rugby sevens ==
Summary

Team	Event	Pool round				Quarterfinal	Semifinal / Cl.	Final / BM / Cl.	
Team	Event	Opposition Result	Opposition Result	Opposition Result	Rank	Opposition Result	Opposition Result	Opposition Result	Rank
France men's	Men's tournament	United States; D 12–12	Uruguay; W 19–12	Fiji; L 12–19	2 Q	Argentina; W 26–14	South Africa; W 19–7	Fiji; W 28–7	1st place, gold medalist(s)
France women's	Women's tournament	Brazil; W 26–0	Japan; W 49–0	United States; W 31–14	1 Q	Canada; L 14–19	Ireland; W 19–7	China; W 21–7	5

=== Men's tournament ===
As the host nation, the French national rugby sevens team directly qualified for the Olympic tournament.

Team roster

France's squad of 12 players was named on 8 July 2024. Additionally, Nelson Epee and William Iraguha were named as traveling reserves.

Head coach: Jérôme Daret

No.	Player	Date of birth (age)
1	Varian Pasquet	29 July 1999 (aged 25)
2	Andy Timo	28 May 2004 (aged 20)
3	Rayan Rebbadj	15 August 1999 (aged 24)
4	Théo Forner	17 October 2001 (aged 22)
5	Stephen Parez	1 August 1994 (aged 29)
6	Paulin Riva (c)	20 April 1994 (aged 30)
7	Jefferson-Lee Joseph	29 October 2002 (aged 21)
8	Antoine Zeghdar	22 May 1999 (aged 25)
9	Aaron Grandidier Nkanang	18 May 2000 (aged 24)
10	Jean-Pascal Barraque	24 April 1991 (aged 33)
11	Antoine Dupont	15 November 1996 (aged 27)
12	Jordan Sepho	8 December 1998 (aged 25)

Group stage

Pos	Team	Pld	W	D	L	PF	PA	PD	Pts	Qualification
1	Fiji	3	3	0	0	97	36	+61	9	Advance to Quarter-finals
2	France (H)	3	1	1	1	43	43	0	6	Advance to Quarter-finals
3	United States	3	1	1	1	57	67	−10	6	Advance to Quarter-finals
4	Uruguay	3	0	0	3	41	92	−51	3	

Source: World Rugby
Rules for classification: 1) Points; 2) Head-to-head result; 3) Point difference; 4) Points scored.
(H) Hosts

24 July 2024
16:30

France	12–12	United States
Try: Sepho 4' m Rebbadj 8' c Con: Barraque (1/2) 8'	World Rugby	Try: Lacamp 7' c Tupuola 12' m Con: Tomasin (1/1) 7'

Stade de France, Paris
Attendance: 69,000
Referee: Adam Leal (England/Great Britain)

24 July 2024
20:00

France	19–12	Uruguay
Try: Zeghdar 3' c Dupont 9' m Joseph 12' c Con: Barraque (2/3) 10', 14'	World Rugby	Try: Facciolo 8' c González 10' m Con: Lijtenstein (1/1) 8'

Stade de France, Paris
Attendance: 69,000
Referee: Nick Hogan (New Zealand)

25 July 2024
15:30

Fiji	19–12	France
Try: Tuwai 6' m Rasaku 9' c Nasova 13' c Con: Teba (1/2) 10'; Veilawa (1/1) 14'	World Rugby	Try: Grandidier Nkanang 4' m Timo 15' c Con: Rebbadj (1/1) 16'

Stade de France, Paris
Attendance: 70,000
Referee: AJ Jacobs (South Africa)

Quarter-final

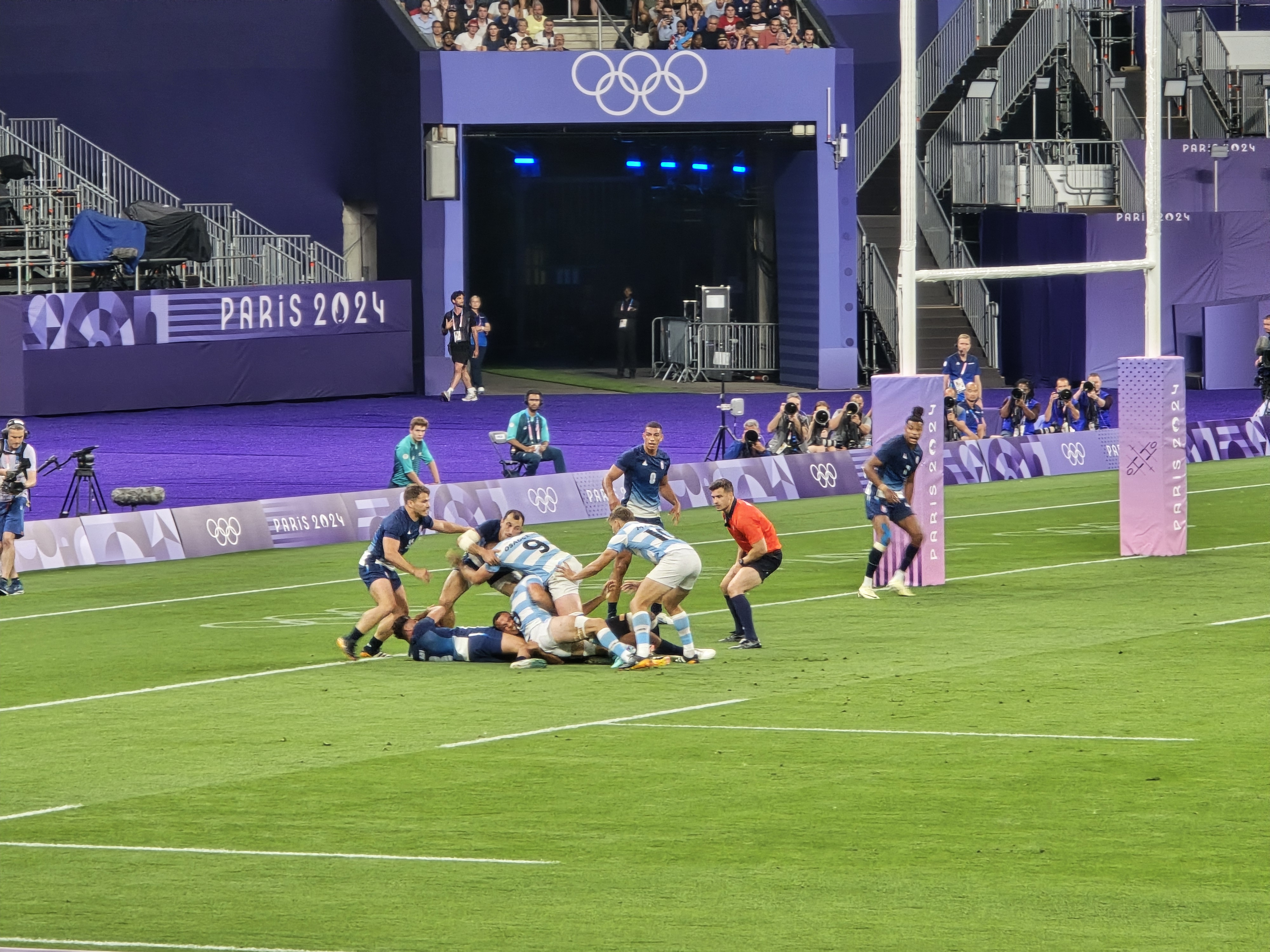
Argentina attacking the try line against France

25 July 2024
21:30

Argentina	14–26	France
Try: Isgró 9' c Moneta 12' c Con: Mare (1/1) 9'; Pellandini (1/1) 12',	World Rugby	Try: Timo 4' c Grandidier Nkanang (2) 4' c, 7' c Dupont 15' m Con: Rebbadj (3/3) 4', 6', 8'

Stade de France, Paris
Attendance: 70,000
Referee: Jordan Way (Australia)

Semi-final

27 July 2024
15:30

South Africa	5–19	France
Try: Leyds 10' m	World Rugby	Try: Rebbadj (2) 11' c, 14' c Sepho 15' m Con: Rebbadj (2/3) 12', 14'

Stade de France, Paris
Referee: Rueben Keane (Australia)

Final

27 July 2024
19:45

(gold) France	28–7	Fiji (silver)
Try: Joseph 5' c Grandidier 8' c Dupont (2) 13' c, 15' c Con: Rebbadj (1/1) 6'; Riva (2/2) 8', 13'; Barraque (1/1) 15'	World Rugby	Try: Talacolo 2' c Con: Teba (1/1) 2'

Stade de France, Paris
Referee: Jordan Way (Australia)

=== Women's tournament ===
As the host nation, the French women's national rugby sevens team directly qualified for the Olympic tournament.

Team roster

France's squad of 12 players was named on 8 July 2024. Additionally, Alycia Chrystiaens and Shannon Izar were named as traveling reserves.

Head coach: David Courteix

- Anne-Cécile Ciofani
- Lili Dezou
- Caroline Drouin
- Camille Grassineau
- Joanna Grisez
- Chloé Jacquet
- Iän Jason
- Carla Neisen (c)
- Lou Noel
- Séraphine Okemba
- Chloé Pelle
- Yolaine Yengo

Group stage

Pos	Team	Pld	W	D	L	PF	PA	PD	Pts	Qualification
1	France (H)	3	3	0	0	106	14	+92	9	Quarter-finals
2	United States	3	2	0	1	74	43	+31	7	Quarter-finals
3	Japan	3	1	0	2	46	97	−51	5	
4	Brazil	3	0	0	3	17	89	−72	3	

Source: World Rugby
Rules for classification: 1) Points; 2) Head-to-head result; 3) Point difference; 4) Points scored.
(H) Hosts

28 July 2024
17:00

France	26–0	Brazil
Try: Grisez 3' c Pelle 5' c Okemba 11' c Jason 15' m Con: Drouin (3/4) 4', 5', 11'	World Rugby

Stade de France, Paris
Referee: Cisco Lopez (United States)

28 July 2024
20:30

France	49–0	Japan
Try: Jason (3) 1' c, 7' c, 9' c Grassineau 3' c Drouin 5' c Ciofani 10' c Jacquet 13' c Con: Drouin (6/6) 2', 4', 5', 8', 9', 10'; Yengo (1/1) 13'	World Rugby

Stade de France, Paris
Referee: Finlay Brown (Scotland/Great Britain)

29 July 2024
15:30

France	31–14	United States
Try: Okemba (4) 7', 8', 9' c, 14' c Jacquet 11' c Con: Drouin (2/4) 9', 11'; Yengo (1/1) 15'	World Rugby	Try: Maher 3' c Tapper 13' c Con: Canett (1/1) 3'; Olsen (1/1) 13'

Stade de France, Paris
Referee: Craig Chan (Hong Kong)

Quarter-finals

29 July 2024
22:00

France	14–19	Canada
Try: Jason 8' c Yengo 8' c Con: Yengo (2/2) 8', 9'	World Rugby	Try: Logan (2) 4' c, 11' c Daniels 14' m Con: Daniels (1/2) 4'; Apps (1/1) 11'

Stade de France, Paris
Referee: Kat Roche (United States)

5–8th place playoff semi-finals

30 July 2024
15:00

France	19–7	Ireland
Try: Okemba 9' c, 14' m Neisen 11' c Con: Drouin (2/2) 9', 12'; Yengo (0/1)	World Rugby	Try: Higgins 6' c Con: Higgins (1/1) 6'

Stade de France, Paris
Referee: Maggie Cogger-Orr (New Zealand)

Fifth place match

30 July 2024
18:30

China	7–21	France
Try: Liu 11' c Con: Dou (1/1) 11'	World Rugby	Try: Yengo 5' c Noel 9' c Pelle 12' c Con: Yengo (1/1) 5'; Drouin (2/2) 9', 13'

Stade de France, Paris
Referee: Maria Latos (Germany)

== Sailing ==
As the host nation, France automatically received a spot in every competition of the sport. Sailors were named throughout the beginning of 2024.

Elimination events

Athlete	Event	Race																											Final rank
Athlete	Event	1	2	3	4	5	6	7	8	9	10	11	12	13	14	QF	SF1	SF2	SF3	SF4	SF5	SF6	F1	F2	F3	F4	F5	F6	Final rank
Nicolas Goyard	Men's IQFoil	1	16	11	5	5	14	~~18~~	15	14	16	~~22~~	15	18	—N/a	Did not advance													15
Hélène Noesmoen	Women's IQFoil	12	19	2	9	5	11	6	4	2	~~25~~; DSQ	6	10	12	~~25~~; BFD	4	Did not advance												7
Axel Mazella	Men's Formula Kite	7	~~13~~	~~9~~	1	5	2	7	Cancelled							—N/a	3	2					Did not advance						6
Lauriane Nolot	Women's Formula Kite	2	1	~~12~~	2	6	1	Cancelled								—N/a	Bye						2	3					2nd place, silver medalist(s)

Medal race events

Athlete	Event	Race																Net points	Final rank
Athlete	Event	1	2	3	4	5	6	7	8	9	10	11	12	13	14	15	M*	Net points	Final rank
Jean-Baptiste Bernaz	Men's Laser	8	19	5	~~31~~	3	20	16	30	Cancelled		—N/a					–	101	12
Louise Cervera	Women's Laser Radial	1	~~24~~	4	18	5	22	18	3	22	Cancelled	—N/a					10	113	10
Clément Pequin; Erwan Fischer	Men's 49er	7	16	2	3	19	10	7	8	12	~~21~~; UFD	20	11	—N/a			DNQ	115	12
Charline Picon; Sarah Steyaert	Women's 49erFX	2	2	2	8	2	2	12	11	10	~~18~~	6	10	—N/a			3	79	3rd place, bronze medalist(s)

Mixed

Athlete	Event	Race													Net points	Final rank
Athlete	Event	1	2	3	4	5	6	7	8	9	10	11	12	M*	Net points	Final rank
Camille Lecointre; Jérémie Mion	470	11	10	~~13~~	4	5	5	6	13	cancelled		—N/a		2	56	6
Tim Mourniac; Lou Berthomieu	Nacra 17	6	6	8	5	7	4	~~20~~; UFD	1	12	4	4	15	2	74	5

M = Medal race; EL = Eliminated – did not advance into the medal race

== Shooting ==
As the host nation, France automatically received a minimum of twelve quota places, with one in each of the individual shooting events. The final selection was announced on 21 June 2024.

Men

Athlete	Event	Qualification		Final	
Athlete	Event	Points	Rank	Points	Rank
Romain Aufrère	10 m air rifle	621.4	45	Did not advance	
Lucas Kryzs	10 m air rifle	629.4	11	Did not advance	
Romain Aufrère	50 m rifle 3 positions	588-34x	15	Did not advance	
Lucas Kryzs	50 m rifle 3 positions	592-35x	4 Q	418.9	6
Florian Fouquet	10 m air pistol	566	28	Did not advance	
Clément Bessaguet	25 m rapid fire pistol	585-17x	7	Did not advance	
Jean Quiquampoix	25 m rapid fire pistol	578-16x	22	Did not advance	
Sébastien Guerrero	Trap	119	19	Did not advance	
Éric Delaunay	Skeet	122	9	Did not advance	

Women

Athlete	Event	Qualification		Final	
Athlete	Event	Points	Rank	Points	Rank
Manon Herbulot	10 m air rifle	625.2	33	Did not advance	
Océanne Muller	10 m air rifle	631.3	8 Q	187.1	5
Judith Gomez	50 m rifle 3 positions	584-28x	17	Did not advance	
Camille Jedrzejewski	10 m air pistol	573-12x	18	Did not advance	
Camille Jedrzejewski	25 m pistol	585	7 Q	36 +1	2nd place, silver medalist(s)
Mathilde Lamolle	25 m pistol	578	23	Did not advance	
Carole Cormenier	Trap	110	28	Did not advance	
Mélanie Couzy	Trap	109	29	Did not advance	
Lucie Anastassiou	Skeet	119	9	Did not advance	

Mixed

Athlete	Event	Qualification		Final / BM	
Athlete	Event	Points	Rank	Points	Rank
Romain Aufrère; Manon Herbulot	10 m air rifle team	627.4	9	Did not advance	
Lucas Kryzs; Océanne Muller	10 m air rifle team	625.8	14	Did not advance	
Florian Fouquet; Camille Jedrzejewski	10 m air pistol team	565–17	17	Did not advance	
Lucie Anastassiou; Éric Delaunay	Skeet team	143	9	Did not advance	

== Skateboarding ==
France automatically had at least one athlete per event as the host nation. More skateboarders were able to qualify through the Olympic rankings. Aurélien Giraud qualified after reaching the semi finals at the Budapest qualifying event.

Athlete	Event	Qualification		Final	
Athlete	Event	Points	Rank	Points	Rank
Vincent Matheron	Men's park	82.02	12	Did not advance	
Joseph Garbaccio	Men's street	72.57	20	Did not advance	
Aurélien Giraud	Men's street	143.71	16	Did not advance	
Vincent Milou	Men's street	252.78	9	Did not advance	
Émilie Alexandre	Women's park	73.48	16	Did not advance	
Nana Taboulet	Women's park	42.33	21	Did not advance	
Lucie Schoonheere	Women's street	228.05	11	Did not advance	

== Sport climbing ==
France qualified seven sport climbers for the Olympic Games. Bassa Mawem qualified directly for the Games by winning the 2023 European Speed Qualification Tournament in Rome, Italy; Oriane Bertone qualified directly for the Games after winning the 2023 European Qualifying Event in Laval, France; Zélia Avezou, Manon Lebon, Capucine Viglione, Paul Jenft & Sam Avezou qualified through the 2024 Olympic Qualifier Series.

Boulder & lead combined

Athlete	Event	Qualification						Final					
Athlete	Event	Boulder		Lead		Total	Rank	Boulder		Lead		Total	Rank
Athlete	Event	Result	Place	Result	Place	Total	Rank	Result	Place	Result	Place	Total	Rank
Sam Avezou	Men's	49.2	4	12.1	14	61.3	11	Did not advance					
Paul Jenft	Men's	34.1	9	57.0	5	91.1	6 Q	24.4	6	54.0	8	78.4	8
Zélia Avezou	Women's	49.3	12	45.1	14	94.4	14	Did not advance					
Oriane Bertone	Women's	84.5	2	45.1	14	129.6	5 Q	59.5	5	45.0	8	104.5	8

Speed

Athlete	Event	Qualification		Round of 16	Quarterfinals	Semifinals	Final / BM	
Athlete	Event	Time	Rank	Opposition Time	Opposition Time	Opposition Time	Opposition Time	Rank
Bassa Mawem	Men's	5.16	8	Tkach (UKR); W 5.16–5.17	Leonardo (INA); L 5.26–4.88	Did not advance		7
Manon Lebon	Women's	9.09	13	Hunt (USA); L 7.07–6.38	Did not advance			11
Capucine Viglione	Women's	7.53	10	Deng (CHN); L 6.86–6.55	Did not advance			10

== Surfing ==
French surfers confirmed four shortboard quota places (two male and two female) for Tahiti. Tokyo 2020 Olympian Johanne Defay secured a direct spot for her second Games, following a top-eight placement among those eligible for qualification in the 2023 World Surf League rankings. Meanwhile, Tahitian natives Kauli Vaast and Vahiné Fierro topped the list of eligible European surfers in their respective shortboard races at the 2023 ISA World Surfing Games in Surf City, El Salvador. Joan Duru also get one additional quota with a top six result at the 2024 World Surfing Games in Arecibo, Puerto Rico.

Athlete	Event	Round 1		Round 2	Round 3	Quarterfinal	Semifinal	Final / BM	
Athlete	Event	Score	Rank	Opposition Result	Opposition Result	Opposition Result	Opposition Result	Opposition Result	Rank
Joan Duru	Men's shortboard	13.84	1 R3	Bye	Cleland (MEX); W 18.13–15.17	Vaast (FRA); L 12.33–15.33	Did not advance		
Kauli Vaast	Men's shortboard	13.63	2 R2	McGillivray (RSA); W 14.03–10.67	Colapinto (USA); W 15.10–13.83	Duru (FRA); W 15.33–12.33	Correa (PER); W 10.96–9.60	Robinson (AUS); W 17.67–7.83	1st place, gold medalist(s)
Johanne Defay	Women's shortboard	9.50	2 R2	Picklum (AUS); W 11.83–7.43	Fierro (FRA); W 9.00–7.54	Moore (USA); W 10.34–6.50	Marks (USA); L 12.17–12.17 (6.50–7.00)	Hennessy (CRC); W 12.66–4.93	3rd place, bronze medalist(s)
Vahiné Fierro	Women's shortboard	11.17	1 R3	Bye	Defay (FRA); L 7.54–9.00	Did not advance			

Qualification legend: R3 – Qualifies to elimination rounds; R2 – Qualifies to repechage round

== Swimming ==
French swimmers achieved the entry standards in the following events with a maximum of two swimmers under the Olympic Qualifying Time (OQT) or the Olympic Consideration Time (OCT). French swimmers that achieved the OQT were selected for the team at the France Championships in Chartres. The full list of swimmers including relayers was confirmed on 8 June 2024.

Men

Athlete	Event	Heat		Semifinal		Final	
Athlete	Event	Time	Rank	Time	Rank	Time	Rank
Maxime Grousset	50 m freestyle	21.94	16 Q	21.60	6 Q	Withdrew	
Florent Manaudou	50 m freestyle	21.54	3 Q	21.64	8 Q	21:56	3rd place, bronze medalist(s)
Rafael Fente-Damers	100 m freestyle	48.82	23	Did not advance			
Maxime Grousset	100 m freestyle	47.70	2	47.63	4	47.71	5
David Aubry	400 m freestyle	3:47.53	15	—N/a		Did not advance	
David Aubry	800 m freestyle	7:44.59	8	—N/a		7:43.59	=5
Pacome Bricout	800 m freestyle	7:57.32	23	—N/a		Did not advance	
David Aubry	1500 m freestyle	14:44.90	4 Q	—N/a		14:44.66	7
Damien Joly	1500 m freestyle	14:45.22	7 Q	—N/a		14:52.61	8
Yohann Ndoye-Brouard	100 m backstroke	53.20	6	52.63	3	52.77	7
Mewen Tomac	100 m backstroke	53.51	13	53.63	15	Did not advance	
Yohann Ndoye-Brouard	200 m backstroke	1:57.92	15	1:58.65	16	Did not advance	
Mewen Tomac	200 m backstroke	1:57.62	13	1:56.43	7	1:55.38 NR	4
Maxime Grousset	100 m butterfly	50.65	4 Q	50.41	2 Q	50.75	5
Clément Secchi	100 m butterfly	51.62	15 Q	51.58	14	Did not advance	
Léon Marchand	200 m breaststroke	2:09.55	3 Q	2:08.11	1 Q	2:05.85 OR ER	1st place, gold medalist(s)
Léon Marchand	200 m butterfly	1:55.26	6 Q	1:53.50	2 Q	1:51.21 OR NR	1st place, gold medalist(s)
Léon Marchand	200 m individual medley	1:57.86	3 Q	1:56.31	1 Q	1:54.06 OR ER	1st place, gold medalist(s)
Léon Marchand	400 m individual medley	4:08.30	1 Q	—N/a		4:02.95 OR	1st place, gold medalist(s)
Guillaume Guth; Rafael Fente-Damers; Hadrien Salvan; Wissam-Amazigh Yebba	4 × 100 m freestyle relay	3:14.84	12	—N/a		Did not advance	
Roman Fuchs; Yann Le Goff; Léon Marchand; Hadrien Salvan; Wissam-Amazigh Yebba	4 × 200 m freestyle relay	7:05.61	3	—N/a		7:04.80	5
Maxime Grousset; Guillaume Guth; Florent Manaudou; Léon Marchand; Yohann Ndoye-Brouard; Mewen Tomac; Antoine Viquerat	4 × 100 m medley relay	3:31.36	1 Q	—N/a		3:28.38 NR	3rd place, bronze medalist(s)
Marc-Antoine Olivier	Men's 10 km open water	—N/a				1:51:50.9	7
Logan Fontaine	Men's 10 km open water	—N/a				1:51:47.9	5

Women

Athlete	Event	Heat		Semifinal		Final	
Athlete	Event	Time	Rank	Time	Rank	Time	Rank
Béryl Gastaldello	50 m freestyle	24.60	10 Q	24.66	11	Did not advance	
Mélanie Henique	50 m freestyle	25.05	22	Did not advance			
Béryl Gastaldello	100 m freestyle	53.65	9	54.29	16	Did not advance	
Marie Wattel	100 m freestyle	53.70	12	53.38	10	Did not advance	
Anastasiya Kirpichnikova	400 m freestyle	4:10.32	15	—N/a		Did not advance	
Anastasiya Kirpichnikova	800 m freestyle	8:22.99	8 Q	—N/a		8:22.80	7
Anastasiya Kirpichnikova	1500 m freestyle	15:52.46	3	—N/a		15:40.35 NR	2nd place, silver medalist(s)
Béryl Gastaldello	100 m backstroke	59.31	6	59.29	7	59.80	8
Emma Terebo	100 m backstroke	59.10	5	59.50	8	59.40	7
Pauline Mahieu	200 m backstroke	2:10.30	14 Q	2:09.56	11	Did not advance	
Emma Terebo	200 m backstroke	2:09.66	8 Q	2:09.38	9	Did not advance	
Marie Wattel	100 m butterfly	57.54	10	57.24	9	Did not advance	
Charlotte Bonnet	200 m individual medley	2:11.47	10 Q	2:12.80	16	Did not advance	
Béryl Gastaldello; Mélanie Henique; Lison Nowaczyk; Marie Wattel	4 × 100 m freestyle relay	3:35.25	5	—N/a		3:34.99	6
Charlotte Bonnet; Marina Jehl; Lucile Tessariol; Assia Touati	4 × 200 m freestyle relay	7:59.98	14	—N/a		Did not advance	
Charlotte Bonnet; Béryl Gastaldello; Mélanie Henique; Mary-Ambre Moluh; Lilou Ressencourt; Marie Wattel; Emma Terebo	4 × 100 m medley relay	3:57.40	7 Q	—N/a		3:56.29 NR	6
Caroline Jouisse	Women's 10 km open water	—N/a				2:06:11.0	8
Océane Cassignol	Women's 10 km open water	—N/a				2:06:06.9	7

Mixed

Athlete	Event	Heat		Final	
Athlete	Event	Time	Rank	Time	Rank
Maxime Grousset; Rafael Fente-Damers; Florent Manaudou; Clément Secchi; Béryl Gastaldello; Mélanie Henique; Lison Nowaczyk; Marie Wattel	4 × 100 m medley relay	3:43.99	7 Q	3:40.96 NR	4

== Table tennis ==
France qualified two full teams (one per gender) for the Olympic Tournament through their host country quota. Via the qualification of the teams, France had two singles players per gender and one mixed double pair. Alexis Lebrun and Jianan Yuan qualified as the highest ranked French pair in mixed doubles. The full team was announced on 21 June 2024.

Men

Athlete	Event	Preliminary	Round 1	Round 2	Round 3	Round of 16	Quarterfinals	Semifinals	Final / BM	
Athlete	Event	Opposition Result	Opposition Result	Opposition Result	Opposition Result	Opposition Result	Opposition Result	Opposition Result	Opposition Result	Rank
Alexis Lebrun	Singles	Bye	Bye	Lorenzo (ARG); W 4–0	Pucar (CRO); W 4–0	Calderano (BRA); L 1–4	Did not advance			
Félix Lebrun	Singles	Bye	Bye	Desai (IND); W 4–0	Källberg (SWE); W 4–2	Ovtcharov (GER); W 4–3	Lin Y (TPE); W 4–3	Fan (CHN); L 0–4	Calderano (BRA); W 4–0	3rd place, bronze medalist(s)
Simon Gauzy; Alexis Lebrun; Félix Lebrun; Jules Rolland (alternate)	Team	—N/a				Slovenia; W 3–0	Brazil; W 3–0	China; L 0–3	Japan; W 3–2	3rd place, bronze medalist(s)

Women

Athlete	Event	Preliminary	Round 1	Round 2	Round 3	Round of 16	Quarterfinals	Semifinals	Final / BM	
Athlete	Event	Opposition Result	Opposition Result	Opposition Result	Opposition Result	Opposition Result	Opposition Result	Opposition Result	Opposition Result	Rank
Prithika Pavade	Singles	Bye	Bye	Shahsavari (IRI); W 4–1	Batra (IND); L 2–4	Did not advance				
Jia Nan Yuan	Singles	Bye	Bye	Bello (NGR); W 4–0	Zhang (CAN); W 4–1	Hayata (JPN); L 0–4	Did not advance			
Charlotte Lutz; Prithika Pavade; Jia Nan Yuan; Audrey Zarif (alternate)	Team	—N/a				Thailand; L 2–3	Did not advance			

Mixed

Athlete	Event	Round of 16	Quarterfinals	Semifinals	Final / BM	
Athlete	Event	Opposition Result	Opposition Result	Opposition Result	Opposition Result	Rank
Alexis Lebrun; Jia Nan Yuan	Doubles	Lin Y / Chen S (TPE); L 2–4	Did not advance			

== Taekwondo ==
Tokyo 2020 bronze medalist Althéa Laurin and 2023 World champion Magda Wiet-Hénin earned additional spots by finishing within the top five in the Olympic rankings in their respective division. The other two athletes were selected on 3 May 2024.

Athlete	Event	Round of 16	Quarterfinals	Semifinals	Repechage	Final / BM	
Athlete	Event	Opposition Result	Opposition Result	Opposition Result	Opposition Result	Opposition Result	Rank
Cyrian Ravet	Men's −58 kg	Gurtsiev (AIN); W 7–6, 5–3	Park T-j (KOR); L 5–8, 4–3, 4–5	—N/a	Granado (VEN); W 2–1, 6–2	Dell'Aquila (ITA) w/o	3rd place, bronze medalist(s)
Souleyman Alaphilippe	Men's −68 kg	Nassar (EGY); W 8–5, 3–2	Pérez (ESP); L 1–2, 5–4, 2–4	Did not advance			
Magda Wiet-Hénin	Women's −67 kg	Teachout (USA); L 8–11, 0–9	Did not advance				
Althéa Laurin	Women's +67 kg	Abdusalomova (TJK); W 3–0, 12–0	Brandl (GER); W 8–3, 8–3	Kuş (TUR); W 2–1, 2–2	Bye	Osipova (UZB); W 3–0, 3–3	1st place, gold medalist(s)

== Tennis ==
France qualified one player per gender through its host country quota. The final team was announced on 21 June 2024 amongst players having sufficient ranking to participate in the Olympic Tournament.

Men

Athlete	Event	Round of 64	Round of 32	Round of 16	Quarterfinals	Semifinals	Final / BM	
Athlete	Event	Opposition Score	Opposition Score	Opposition Score	Opposition Score	Opposition Score	Opposition Score	Rank
Arthur Fils	Singles	Arnaldi (ITA); L 4–6, 6–7^{(7–9)}	Did not advance					=33
Ugo Humbert	Singles	Marozsán (HUN); W 6–3, 6–2	Cerúndolo (ARG); L 5–7, 7–6^{(7–5)}, 5–7	Did not advance				=17
Gaël Monfils	Singles	Musetti (ITA); L 1–6, 4–6	Did not advance					=33
Corentin Moutet	Singles	Nagal (IND); W 6–2, 2–6, 7–5	Struff (GER); W WO	Paul (USA); L 6–7^{(5–7)}, 3–6	Did not advance			=9
Arthur Fils; Ugo Humbert	Doubles	—N/a	Gillé / Vliegen (BEL); L 5–7, 4–6	Did not advance				=17
Gaël Monfils; Édouard Roger-Vasselin	Doubles	—N/a	Balaji / Bopanna (IND); W 7–5, 6–2	Krawietz / Pütz (GER); L 3–6, 1–6	Did not advance			=9

Women

Athlete	Event	Round of 64	Round of 32	Round of 16	Quarterfinals	Semifinals	Final / BM	
Athlete	Event	Opposition Score	Opposition Score	Opposition Score	Opposition Score	Opposition Score	Opposition Score	Rank
Clara Burel	Singles	Siniaková (CZE); W 7–6^{(7–3)}, 6–4	Kostyuk (UKR); L 6–7^{(3–7)}, 2–6	Did not advance				=17
Caroline Garcia	Singles	Cristian (ROU); L 7–5, 3–6, 4–6	Did not advance					=33
Varvara Gracheva	Singles	Haddad Maia (BRA); L 4–6, 6–4, 0–6	Did not advance					=33
Diane Parry	Singles	Podoroska (ARG); W 7–6^{(8–6)}, 7–5	Świątek (POL); L 1–6, 1–6	Did not advance				=17
Caroline Garcia; Diane Parry	Doubles	—N/a	Rus / Schuurs (NED); W 6–7^{(2–7)}, 6–3, [10–4]	Errani / Paolini (ITA); L 7–5, 3–6, [8–10]	Did not advance			=9
Clara Burel; Varvara Gracheva	Doubles	—N/a	Dabrowski / Fernandez (CAN); L 1–6, 5–7	Did not advance				=17

Mixed

Athlete	Event	Round of 16	Quarterfinals	Semifinals	Final / BM	
Athlete	Event	Opposition Score	Opposition Score	Opposition Score	Opposition Score	Rank
Caroline Garcia; Édouard Roger-Vasselin	Doubles	Shibahara / Nishikori (JPN); L 4–6, 6–3, [7–10]	Did not advance			=9

== Triathlon ==
As the host nation, France received four quota places with two for each gender in the individual and mixed relay triathlon events. The official selection was made on 5 June 2024.

Individual

Athlete	Event	Time						Rank
Athlete	Event	Swim (1.5 km)	Trans 1	Bike (40 km)	Trans 2	Run (10 km)	Total	Rank
Léo Bergère	Men's	20:37	00:51	51:55	00:25	29:55	1:43:43	3rd place, bronze medalist(s)
Dorian Coninx	Men's	20:18	00:50	52:17	00:23	33:49	1:47:37	27
Pierre Le Corre	Men's	20:20	00:51	52:14	00:25	30:01	1:43:51	4
Cassandre Beaugrand	Women's	22:32	00:53	58:20	00:28	32:42	1:54:55	1st place, gold medalist(s)
Emma Lombardi	Women's	22:36	00:56	58:12	00:27	33:05	1:55:16	4
Léonie Périault	Women's	24:06	00:57	1:00:35	00:31	34:31	2:00:40	27

Relay

Athlete	Event	Time						Rank
Athlete	Event	Swim (300 m)	Trans 1	Bike (7 km)	Trans 2	Run (2 km)	Total	Rank
Pierre Le Corre	Mixed relay	4:11	1:04	10:04	0:26	4:58	20:43	—N/a
Emma Lombardi	Mixed relay	4:57	1:07	10:50	0:26	5:39	22:59	—N/a
Léo Bergère	Mixed relay	4:23	1:01	9:32	0:25	5:02	20:23	—N/a
Cassandre Beaugrand	Mixed relay	5:13	1:08	10:19	0:25	5:37	22:42	—N/a
Total	Mixed relay	—N/a					1:26:47	4

== Volleyball ==
=== Beach ===
As the host, France qualified a pair for each event automatically. Alexia Richard and Lézana Placette qualified through the FIVB Olympic Rankings on 7 June 2024, leaving an extra spot for a women's French pair. A second men's pair also qualified through winning the 2024 CEV Continental Cup Final in Jūrmala, Latvia.

Athletes	Event	Preliminary round				Lucky Loser	Round of 16	Quarterfinal	Semifinal	Final / BM	
Athletes	Event	Opposition Score	Opposition Score	Opposition Score	Rank	Opposition Score	Opposition Score	Opposition Score	Opposition Score	Opposition Score	Rank
Arnaud Gauthier-Rat; Youssef Krou	Men's	Evans / Budinger (USA); L 0–2 (14–21, 11–21)	Herrera / Gavira (ESP); L 1–2 (21–23, 23–21, 8–15)	Boermans / De Groot (NED); L 0–2 (15–21, 16–21)	4	Did not advance					19
Rémi Bassereau; Julien Lyneel	Men's	Ehlers / Wickler (GER); L 0–2 (15–21, 17–21)	Bryl / Łosiak (POL); L 0–2 (15–21, 18–21)	Hodges / Schubert (AUS); L 0–2 (16–21, 20–22)	4	Did not advance					19
Lézana Placette; Alexia Richard	Women's	Ludwig / Lippmann (GER); W 2–0 (21–14, 22–20)	Álvarez / Moreno (ESP); L 0–2 (12–21, 15–21)	Hüberli / Brunner (SUI); L 0–2 (11–21, 8–21)	3 Q	Akiko / Ishii (JPN); L 0–2 (15–21, 18–21)	Did not advance				17
Aline Chamereau; Clémence Vieira	Women's	Müller / Tillmann (GER); L 0–2 (14–21, 12–21)	Hughes / Cheng (USA); L 0–2 (16–21, 21–23)	Hermannová / Štochlová (CZE); L 1–2 (13–21, 21–18, 9–15)	4	Did not advance					19

=== Indoor ===
Summary

Team	Event	Group stage				Quarterfinal	Semifinal	Final / BM	
Team	Event	Opposition Score	Opposition Score	Opposition Score	Rank	Opposition Score	Opposition Score	Opposition Score	Rank
France men's	Men's tournament	Serbia; W 3–2	Canada; W 3–0	Slovenia; L 2–3	2 Q	Germany; W 3–2	Italy; W 3–0	Poland; W 3–0	1st place, gold medalist(s)
France women's	Women's tournament	Serbia; L 0–3	China; L 0–3	United States; L 0–3	4	Did not advance			

==== Men's tournament ====
As the host nation, the French men's national volleyball team directly qualified for the Olympic tournament.

Team roster

The roster was announced on 8 July 2024.

Head coach: (Italy) Andrea Giani

- 1 Barthélémy Chinenyeze MB
- 2 Jenia Grebennikov L
- 4 Jean Patry OP
- 6 Benjamin Toniutti (c) S
- 7 Kévin Tillie OH
- 9 Earvin N'Gapeth OH
- 11 Antoine Brizard S
- 14 Nicolas Le Goff MB
- 17 Trévor Clévenot OH
- 19 Yacine Louati OH
- 21 Théo Faure OP
- 25 Quentin Jouffroy MB

Group play

Pos	Team	Pld	W	L	Pts	SW	SL	SR	SPW	SPL	SPR	Qualification
1	Slovenia	3	3	0	8	9	3	3.000	282	252	1.119	Quarterfinals
2	France (H)	3	2	1	6	8	5	1.600	290	260	1.115	Quarterfinals
3	Serbia	3	1	2	3	5	8	0.625	256	293	0.874	
4	Canada	3	0	3	1	3	9	0.333	254	277	0.917	

Source: Olympics
Rules for classification: Tiebreakers
(H) Host

28 July 2024; 17:00	France	3–2	Serbia	South Paris Arena 1, Paris; Attendance: 9,372; Referees: Juraj Mokrý (SVK), Hamid Al-Rousi (UAE)
28 July 2024; 17:00	(23–25, 25–17, 25–17, 21–25, 15–6); P2 Report			South Paris Arena 1, Paris; Attendance: 9,372; Referees: Juraj Mokrý (SVK), Hamid Al-Rousi (UAE)

30 July 2024; 21:00	France	3–0	Canada	South Paris Arena 1, Paris; Attendance: 9,365; Referees: Ivaylo Ivanov (BUL), Epaminondas Gerothodoros (GRE)
30 July 2024; 21:00	(25–20, 25–21, 25–17); P2 Report			South Paris Arena 1, Paris; Attendance: 9,365; Referees: Ivaylo Ivanov (BUL), Epaminondas Gerothodoros (GRE)

2 August 2024; 17:00	France	2–3	Slovenia	South Paris Arena 1, Paris; Attendance: 9,505; Referees: Vladimir Simonović (SUI), Wojciech Maroszek (POL)
2 August 2024; 17:00	(20–25, 23–25, 27–25, 25–22, 11–15); P2 Report			South Paris Arena 1, Paris; Attendance: 9,505; Referees: Vladimir Simonović (SUI), Wojciech Maroszek (POL)

Quarterfinal

5 August 2024; 17:00	France	3–2	Germany	South Paris Arena 1, Paris; Attendance: 9,405; Referees: Juraj Mokrý (SVK), Denny Cespedes (DOM)
5 August 2024; 17:00	(18–25, 26–28, 25–20, 25–21, 15–13); P2 Report			South Paris Arena 1, Paris; Attendance: 9,405; Referees: Juraj Mokrý (SVK), Denny Cespedes (DOM)

Semifinal

7 August 2024; 20:00	Italy	0–3	France	South Paris Arena 1, Paris; Attendance: 9,547; Referees: Denny Cespedes (DOM), Ivaylo Ivanov (BUL)
7 August 2024; 20:00	(20–25, 21–25, 21–25); P2 Report			South Paris Arena 1, Paris; Attendance: 9,547; Referees: Denny Cespedes (DOM), Ivaylo Ivanov (BUL)

Gold medal game

10 August 2024; 13:00	France	3–0	Poland	South Paris Arena 1, Paris; Attendance: 9,233; Referees: Stefano Cesare (ITA), Hamid Al-Rousi (UAE)
10 August 2024; 13:00	(25–19, 25–20, 25–23); P2 Report			South Paris Arena 1, Paris; Attendance: 9,233; Referees: Stefano Cesare (ITA), Hamid Al-Rousi (UAE)

==== Women's tournament ====
As the host nation, the French women's national volleyball team directly qualified for the Olympic tournament.

Team roster

The roster was announced on 8 July 2024.

Head coach: (Belgium) Émile Rousseaux

- 1 Héléna Cazaute (c) OH
- 3 Amandine GiardinoL
- 4 Christina Bauer MB
- 7 Iman Ndiaye OP
- 9 Nina Stojiljković S
- 11 Lucille Gicquel OP
- 15 Amandha Marine Sylves MB
- 23 Léandra Olinga-Andela MB
- 63 Émilie Respaut S
- 88 Amélie Rotar OH
- 91 Halimatou Bah OH
- 99 Juliette Gelin L

Group play

Pos	Team	Pld	W	L	Pts	SW	SL	SR	SPW	SPL	SPR	Qualification
1	China	3	3	0	8	9	3	3.000	277	249	1.112	Quarter-finals
2	United States	3	2	1	6	8	5	1.600	286	278	1.029	Quarter-finals
3	Serbia	3	1	2	4	6	6	1.000	271	257	1.054	Quarter-finals
4	France (H)	3	0	3	0	0	9	0.000	183	233	0.785	

Source: Olympics
Rules for classification: Tiebreakers
(H) Host

29 July 2024; 21:00	France	0–3	Serbia	South Paris Arena 1, Paris; Attendance: 9,350; Referees: Nurper Özbar (TUR), Epaminondas Gerothodoros (GRE)
29 July 2024; 21:00	(17–25, 17–25, 22–25); P2 Report			South Paris Arena 1, Paris; Attendance: 9,350; Referees: Nurper Özbar (TUR), Epaminondas Gerothodoros (GRE)

1 August 2024; 21:00	France	0–3	China	South Paris Arena 1, Paris; Attendance: 9,434; Referees: Wael Kandil (EGY), Ivaylo Ivanov (BUL)
1 August 2024; 21:00	(18–25, 16–25, 19–25); P2 Report			South Paris Arena 1, Paris; Attendance: 9,434; Referees: Wael Kandil (EGY), Ivaylo Ivanov (BUL)

4 August 2024; 13:00	France	0–3	United States	South Paris Arena 1, Paris; Attendance: 9,402; Referees: Ivaylo Ivanov (BUL), Scott Dziewirz (CAN)
4 August 2024; 13:00	(27–29, 27–29, 20–25); P2 Report			South Paris Arena 1, Paris; Attendance: 9,402; Referees: Ivaylo Ivanov (BUL), Scott Dziewirz (CAN)

== Water polo ==
Summary

Key:
- FT – After full time.
- P – Match decided by penalty-shootout.

Team	Event	Group stage						Quarterfinal	Semifinal	Final / BM	
Team	Event	Opposition Score	Opposition Score	Opposition Score	Opposition Score	Opposition Score	Rank	Opposition Score	Opposition Score	Opposition Score	Rank
French men's	Men's tournament	Hungary; L 12–13	Japan; W 14–13	Australia; L 8–9	Serbia; L 8–15	Spain; L 8–10	5	Did not advance			10
French women's	Women's tournament	Spain; L 6–15	Italy; W 9–8	United States; L 5–17	Greece; L 4–11	—N/a	5	Did not advance			9

=== Men's tournament ===
As the host nation, the French men's national water polo team directly qualified for the Olympic tournament.

Team roster

The roster was announced on 8 July 2024.

Head coach: Florian Bruzzo

- 1 Clément Dubois GK
- 2 Rémi Saudadier CF
- 3 Ugo Crousillat (c) D
- 4 Alexandre Bouet W
- 5 Enzo Khasz CB
- 6 Thomas Vernoux CF
- 7 Romain Marion-Vernoux D
- 8 Emil Bjorch CF
- 9 Mehdi Marzouki D
- 10 Michaël Bodegas CF
- 11 Pierre-Frédéric Vanpeperstraete W
- 12 Enzo Nardon W
- 13 Hugo Fontani GK

Group play

Pos	Team	Pld	W	PSW	PSL	L	GF	GA	GD	Pts	Qualification
1	Spain	5	5	0	0	0	67	39	+28	15	Quarterfinals
2	Australia	5	3	0	0	2	44	42	+2	9 (Note: Australia 9–8 Hungary)	Quarterfinals
3	Hungary	5	3	0	0	2	62	54	+8	9	Quarterfinals
4	Serbia	5	2	0	0	3	58	63	−5	6	Quarterfinals
5	France (H)	5	1	0	0	4	50	60	−10	3 (Note: France 14–13 Japan)	
6	Japan	5	1	0	0	4	60	83	−23	3	

Source: Olympics
Rules for classification: 1) Points; 2) Head-to-head points; 3) Head-to-head goal difference; 4) Head-to-head goals scored; 5) Goal difference.
(H) Host
Notes:

28 July 2024; 19:30 v	Report	France	12–13	Hungary	Paris Aquatic Centre, Paris; Referees: Adrian Alexandrescu (ROU), Andrej Franulović (CRO)
28 July 2024; 19:30 v	Report	Score by quarters: 1–5, 4–4, 2–1, 5–3			Paris Aquatic Centre, Paris; Referees: Adrian Alexandrescu (ROU), Andrej Franulović (CRO)
28 July 2024; 19:30 v	Report	Vernoux 4	Goals	Vigvári 3	Paris Aquatic Centre, Paris; Referees: Adrian Alexandrescu (ROU), Andrej Franulović (CRO)

30 July 2024; 15:00 v	Report	Japan	13–14	France	Paris Aquatic Centre, Paris; Referees: Georgios Stavridis (GRE), Darren Spiritosanto (USA)
30 July 2024; 15:00 v	Report	Score by quarters: 4–4, 2–3, 3–3, 4–4			Paris Aquatic Centre, Paris; Referees: Georgios Stavridis (GRE), Darren Spiritosanto (USA)
30 July 2024; 15:00 v	Report	Inaba 6	Goals	Bodegas 3	Paris Aquatic Centre, Paris; Referees: Georgios Stavridis (GRE), Darren Spiritosanto (USA)

1 August 2024; 15:00 v	Report	France	8–9	Australia	Paris Aquatic Centre, Paris; Referees: Andrej Franulović (CRO), Veselin Mišković (MNE)
1 August 2024; 15:00 v	Report	Score by quarters: 0–1, 3–3, 2–3, 3–2			Paris Aquatic Centre, Paris; Referees: Andrej Franulović (CRO), Veselin Mišković (MNE)
1 August 2024; 15:00 v	Report	Crousillat, Bjoch 3	Goals	Maksimovic 3	Paris Aquatic Centre, Paris; Referees: Andrej Franulović (CRO), Veselin Mišković (MNE)

3 August 2024; 19:30 v	Report	Serbia	15–8	France	Paris Aquatic Centre, Paris; Referees: Boris Margeta (SLO), Adrian Alexandrescu (ROU)
3 August 2024; 19:30 v	Report	Score by quarters: 4–2, 4–2, 4–2, 3–2			Paris Aquatic Centre, Paris; Referees: Boris Margeta (SLO), Adrian Alexandrescu (ROU)
3 August 2024; 19:30 v	Report	four players 2	Goals	Marzouki, Vernoux 2	Paris Aquatic Centre, Paris; Referees: Boris Margeta (SLO), Adrian Alexandrescu (ROU)

5 August 2024; 20:05 v	Report	France	8–10	Spain	Paris La Défense Arena, Paris; Referees: Georgios Stavridis (GRE), Veselin Mišković (MNE)
5 August 2024; 20:05 v	Report	Score by quarters: 1–3, 2–2, 4–2, 1–3			Paris La Défense Arena, Paris; Referees: Georgios Stavridis (GRE), Veselin Mišković (MNE)
5 August 2024; 20:05 v	Report	Crousillat 3	Goals	Munárriz, Sanahuja 3	Paris La Défense Arena, Paris; Referees: Georgios Stavridis (GRE), Veselin Mišković (MNE)

=== Women's tournament ===
As the host nation, the French women's national water polo team directly qualified for the Olympic tournament.

Team roster

The roster was announced on 8 July 2024.

Head coach: Émilien Bugeaud

- 1 Mia Rycraw GK
- 2 Lara Andres W
- 3 Valentine Heurtaux D
- 4 Camélia Bouloukbachi CB
- 5 Louise Guillet (c) D
- 6 Orsolya Hertzka D
- 7 Juliette Dhalluin D
- 8 Aurélie Battu CF
- 9 Ema Vernoux D
- 10 Camille Radosavljevic CB
- 11 Tiziana Raspo CF
- 12 Audrey Daule W
- 13 Pasiphaé Martineaud-Perret GK

Group play

Pos	Team	Pld	W	PSW	PSL	L	GF	GA	GD	Pts	Qualification
1	Spain	4	4	0	0	0	51	36	+15	12	Quarterfinals
2	United States	4	3	0	0	1	53	27	+26	9	Quarterfinals
3	Italy	4	1	0	0	3	34	40	−6	3 (Note: Greece 3 Pts, +3 GD; Italy 3 Pts, +3 GD; France 3 Pts, −6 GD. Italy ranked above Greece due to more goals scored.)	Quarterfinals
4	Greece	4	1	0	0	3	33	41	−8	3	Quarterfinals
5	France (H)	4	1	0	0	3	24	51	−27	3	

Source: Olympics
Rules for classification: 1) Points; 2) Head-to-head points; 3) Head-to-head goal difference; 4) Head-to-head goals scored; 5) Goal difference.
(H) Host
Notes:

27 July 2024; 18:30 v	Report	Spain	15–6	France	Paris Aquatic Centre, Paris; Referees: Hélène Painchaud (CAN), Zhang Liang (CHN)
27 July 2024; 18:30 v	Report	Score by quarters: 6–3, 3–1, 3–1, 3–1			Paris Aquatic Centre, Paris; Referees: Hélène Painchaud (CAN), Zhang Liang (CHN)
27 July 2024; 18:30 v	Report	Ruiz 4	Goals	Dhalluin 3	Paris Aquatic Centre, Paris; Referees: Hélène Painchaud (CAN), Zhang Liang (CHN)

29 July 2024; 14:00 v	Report	France	9–8	Italy	Paris Aquatic Centre, Paris; Referees: Nóra Debreceni (HUN), Nicholas Hodgers (AUS)
29 July 2024; 14:00 v	Report	Score by quarters: 1–3, 3–3, 2–1, 3–1			Paris Aquatic Centre, Paris; Referees: Nóra Debreceni (HUN), Nicholas Hodgers (AUS)
29 July 2024; 14:00 v	Report	Dhalluin 3	Goals	Bianconi 2	Paris Aquatic Centre, Paris; Referees: Nóra Debreceni (HUN), Nicholas Hodgers (AUS)

2 August 2024; 18:30 v	Report	United States	17–5	France	Paris Aquatic Centre, Paris; Referees: Veselin Mišković (MNE), Nicholas Hodgers (AUS)
2 August 2024; 18:30 v	Report	Score by quarters: 3–1, 4–2, 6–2, 4–0			Paris Aquatic Centre, Paris; Referees: Veselin Mišković (MNE), Nicholas Hodgers (AUS)
2 August 2024; 18:30 v	Report	Musselman 4	Goals	Hertzka 2	Paris Aquatic Centre, Paris; Referees: Veselin Mišković (MNE), Nicholas Hodgers (AUS)

4 August 2024; 20:05 v	Report	France	4–11	Greece	Paris Aquatic Centre, Paris; Referees: Vojin Putniković (SRB), Veselin Mišković (MNE)
4 August 2024; 20:05 v	Report	Score by quarters: 1–2, 2–1, 1–3, 0–5			Paris Aquatic Centre, Paris; Referees: Vojin Putniković (SRB), Veselin Mišković (MNE)
4 August 2024; 20:05 v	Report	Vernoux 2	Goals	Plevritou, Xenaki 3	Paris Aquatic Centre, Paris; Referees: Vojin Putniković (SRB), Veselin Mišković (MNE)

== Weightlifting ==
As the host nation, France entered three weightlifters into the Olympic competition. Dora Tchakounté (women's 59 kg), Marie Fegue (women's 71 kg) and Romain Imadouchène (men's 89 kg) secured one of the top ten slots in their respective weight divisions based on the IWF Olympic Qualification Rankings. The final weightlifter, Bernardin Kingue Matam was announced on 14 June.

Athlete	Event	Snatch		Clean & Jerk		Total	Rank
Athlete	Event	Result	Rank	Result	Rank	Total	Rank
Bernardin Kingue Matam	Men's −73 kg	145	11	175	9	320	9
Romain Imadouchène	Men's −89 kg	155	11	196	9	351	9
Dora Tchakounté	Women's −59 kg	98	9	115	9	213	9
Marie Fegue	Women's −71 kg	110	6	133	6	243	5

== Wrestling ==
France initially qualified four wrestlers for each of the following classes into the Olympic competition. Koumba Larroque qualified for the Games with a top five finish at the 2023 World Championships in Belgrade, Serbia. On 8 July, after a Russian athlete withdrew, the quota for the 62 kg category was adjusted, and French wrestler Ameline Douarre was also allowed to compete.

Key:

- VT (ranking points: 5–0 or 0–5) – Victory by fall.
- VB (ranking points: 5–0 or 0–5) – Victory by injury (VF for forfeit, VA for withdrawal or disqualification)
- PP (ranking points: 3–1 or 1–3) – Decision by points – the loser with technical points.
- PO (ranking points: 3–0 or 0–3) – Decision by points – the loser without technical points.
- ST (ranking points: 4–0 or 0–4) – Great superiority – the loser without technical points and a margin of victory of at least 8 (Greco-Roman) or 10 (freestyle) points.
- SP (ranking points: 4–1 or 1–4) – Technical superiority – the loser with technical points and a margin of victory of at least 8 (Greco-Roman) or 10 (freestyle) points.

Athlete	Event	Round of 16	Quarterfinal	Semifinal	Repechage	Final / BM	
Athlete	Event	Opposition Result	Opposition Result	Opposition Result	Opposition Result	Opposition Result	Rank
Améline Douarre	Women's freestyle 62 kg	Godinez (CAN); L 2–5	Did not advance				
Koumba Larroque	Women's freestyle 68 kg	Ford (NZL); W 3–0 ^{PO}	Oborududu (NGR); L 1–3 ^{PP}	Did not advance			
Mamadassa Sylla	Men's Greco-Roman 67 kg	Nasr (TUN); W 1–1	Galstyan (ARM); L 2–3	Did not advance			

== See also ==
- France at the 2024 Summer Paralympics
- France at the 2024 Winter Youth Olympics
