= Latvia at the 2024 Summer Olympics =

- IOC code: LAT
- NOC: Latvian Olympic Committee
- Website: www.olimpiade.lv (in Latvian and English)

in Paris, France
- Competitors: 29 (16 men and 13 women) in 11 sports
- Flag bearers (opening): Nauris Miezis & Tīna Graudiņa
- Flag bearers (closing): Ernests Zēbolds & Gunta Vaičule
- Medals: Gold 0 Silver 0 Bronze 0 Total 0

Summer Olympics appearances (overview)
- 1924; 1928; 1932; 1936; 1948–1988; 1992; 1996; 2000; 2004; 2008; 2012; 2016; 2020; 2024

Other related appearances
- Russian Empire (1908–1912); Soviet Union (1952–1988)

Latvia competed at the 2024 Summer Olympics in Paris from 26 July to 11 August 2024. It was the nation's ninth consecutive appearance at the Games.

For the second time since 2016, Latvia failed to secure a single Summer Olympic medal. The best finish was 4th place in men's 3x3 basketball.

== Competitors ==
The following is the list of a number of competitors in the Games.

Sport	Men	Women	Total
Athletics	3	5	8
Basketball	4	0	4
Cycling	4	2	6
Diving	0	1	1
Equestrian	1	0	1
Modern pentathlon	1	0	1
Shooting	1	1	2
Swimming	1	1	2
Tennis	0	1	1
Volleyball	0	2	2
Weightlifting	1	0	1
Total	16	13	29

== Athletics ==
Latvian track and field athletes achieved the entry standards for Paris 2024, either by passing the direct qualifying mark (or time for track and road races) or by world ranking, in the following events (a maximum of 3 athletes each):

Key

- Note–Ranks given for track events are within the athlete's heat only
- Q = Qualified for the next round
- q = Qualified for the next round as the fastest loser or, in field events, by position without achieving the qualifying target
- NR = National record
- N/A = Round not applicable for the event
- Bye = Athlete not required to compete in round

Track & road events

Athlete	Event	Heat		Repechage		Semifinal		Final	
Athlete	Event	Result	Rank	Result	Rank	Result	Rank	Result	Rank
Gunta Vaičule	Women's 400 m	51.13	5 R	50.93	2	Did not advance			
Agate Caune	Women's 5000 m	15:38.19	33	—N/a					

Field events

Athlete	Event	Qualification		Final	
Athlete	Event	Distance	Position	Distance	Position
Valters Kreišs	Men's pole vault	5.70	11 q	5.50	12
Gatis Čakšs	Men's javelin throw	NM		Did not advance	
Patriks Gailums	Men's javelin throw	77.26	25	Did not advance	
Rūta Kate Lasmane	Women's triple jump	13.76	22	—N/a	
Līna Mūze	Women's javelin throw	60.30	17	Did not advance	
Anete Sietiņa	Women's javelin throw	60.47	15	Did not advance	

== Basketball ==
=== 3×3 basketball ===
Summary

Team	Event	Group stage								Quarterfinal	Semifinal	Final / BM	
Team	Event	Opposition Score	Opposition Score	Opposition Score	Opposition Score	Opposition Score	Opposition Score	Opposition Score	Rank	Opposition Score	Opposition Score	Opposition Score	Rank
Latvia men's	Men's tournament	Lithuania; W 21–14	Netherlands; W 21–12	China; W 22–8	United States; W 21–19	France; W 22–20	Serbia; W 21–14	Poland; W 22–16	1	—N/a	France; L 14–21	Lithuania; L 18–21	4

==== Men's tournament ====
The Latvia men's 3x3 team by winning the FIBA Universality-driven Olympic Qualifying Tournament 1 in Hong Kong.

Team roster

The roster was announced on 8 July 2024.

- Kārlis Lasmanis
- Nauris Miezis
- Zigmārs Raimo
- Francis Lācis

Group play

Pos	Team	Pld	W	L	PF	PA	PD	Qualification
1	Latvia	7	7	0	147	103	+44	Semifinals
2	Netherlands	7	5	2	133	112	+21	Semifinals
3	Lithuania	7	4 (Note: Lithuania 20–18 Serbia)	3	134	125	+9	Play-ins
4	Serbia	7	4	3	129	123	+6	Play-ins
5	France (H)	7	3	4	131	132	−1	Play-ins
6	Poland	7	2 (Note: United States 17–19 Poland)	5	116	139	−23	Play-ins
7	United States	7	2	5	116	138	−22	
8	China	7	1	6	107	141	−34	

Source: FIBA
Rules for classification: 1) Wins; 2) Head-to-head record; 3) Points scored.
(H) Hosts
Notes:

30 July 2024
18:35
v

Boxscore

Latvia	21–14	Lithuania
Pts: Miezis 9		Pts: Pukelis 8

Place de la Concorde, Paris
Referees: Marek Maliszewski (POL), Jasmina Juras (SRB)

31 July 2024
18:35
v

Boxscore

Latvia	21–12	Netherlands
Pts: Lasmanis 8		Pts: De Jong 7

Place de la Concorde, Paris
Referees: Brigitta Csabai-Kaskötő (HUN), Deanna Jackson (USA)

1 August 2024
10:35
v

Boxscore

China	8–22	Latvia
Pts: Zhang 6		Pts: Lācis 8

Place de la Concorde, Paris
Referees: Deanna Jackson (USA), Jasmina Juras (SRB)

1 August 2024
23:05
v

Boxscore

United States	19–21	Latvia
Pts: Barry 10		Pts: Miezis 10

Place de la Concorde, Paris
Referees: Najib Chajiddine (FRA), Vlad Ghizdareanu (ROU)

2 August 2024
14:05
v

Boxscore

France	20–22	Latvia
Pts: Seguela 10		Pts: Miezis 10

Place de la Concorde, Paris
Referees: Brigitta Csabai-Kaskötő (HUN), Marek Maliszewski (POL)

2 August 2024
19:05
v

Boxscore

Latvia	21–14	Serbia
Pts: Lācis, Lasmanis 8		Pts: Majstorović 7

Place de la Concorde, Paris
Referees: Markos Michaelides (SUI), Vlad Ghizdareanu (ROU)

4 August 2024
18:00
v

Boxscore

Poland	16–22	Latvia
Pts: Sokołowski 6		Pts: Miezis 13

Place de la Concorde, Paris
Referees: Brigitta Csabai-Kaskötő (HUN), Edmond Ho (HKG)

Semifinal

5 August 2024
19:00
v

Boxscore

Latvia	14–21	France
Pts: Lasmanis 11		Pts: Dussoulier 9

Place de la Concorde, Paris
Referees: Brigitta Csabai-Kaskötő (HUN), Edmond Ho (HKG)

Bronze medal game

5 August 2024
21:30
v

Boxscore

Latvia	18–21	Lithuania
Pts: Lasmanis 9		Pts: Vingelis 9

Place de la Concorde, Paris
Referees: Markos Michaelides (SUI), Deanna Jackson (USA)

== Cycling ==
=== Road ===
Latvia entered one male and one female road cyclist into the games. Latvia secured those quota through the UCI Nation Ranking and 2023 World Championships in Glasgow, Great Britain.

Athlete	Event	Time	Rank
Toms Skujiņš	Men's road race	6:20:50	5
Anastasia Carbonari	Women's road race	4:10:47	69

=== Mountain biking ===
Latvian mountain bikers secured one male quota places for the Olympic through 2023 UCI Mountain Bike World Championships in Glasgow, Great Britain.

Athlete	Event	Time	Rank
Mārtiņš Blūms	Men's cross-country	1:29:11	17

=== BMX ===
Freestyle

Latvia entered one BMX rider to compete in the men's freestyle, by reallocation of host nation quota (from 2023 World Championships).

Athlete	Event	Seeding		Final	
Athlete	Event	Score	Rank	Score	Rank
Ernests Zēbolds	Men's freestyle	84.60	9 Q	87.14	8

Race

Latvian riders secured a single quota place in the men's BMX race for Paris 2024 by topping the field of nations vying for qualification at the 2023 UCI BMX World Championships in Glasgow, Great Britain. Single quota place in the women's BMX race - reallocation from unused host country quota.

Athlete	Event	Quarterfinal		Last chance race		Semifinal		Final		Overall placing
Athlete	Event	Points	Rank	Result	Rank	Points	Rank	Result	Rank	Rank
Kristens Krīgers	Men's race	26	24	—N/a						24
Veronika Stūriška	Women's race	19	18	2:15.767	8	—N/a				20

== Diving ==
Latvia entered one diver, Džeja Patrika into the Olympic competition.

Athlete	Event	Preliminary		Semifinal		Final	
Athlete	Event	Points	Rank	Points	Rank	Points	Rank
Džeja Patrika	Women's 10 m platform	259.30	22	Did not advance			

== Equestrian ==
Latvia entered one riders in the individual jumping event, through the establishments of final olympics ranking for Group C (Central & Eastern Europe; Central Asia).

=== Jumping ===
Athlete	Horse	Event	Qualification			Final		
Athlete	Horse	Event	Penalties	Time	Rank	Penalties	Time	Rank
Kristaps Neretnieks	Palladium KJV	Individual	12.00	73.66	56	Did not advance		

== Modern pentathlon ==
Latvian modern pentathletes confirmed a single quota place for the Olympic games. Pāvels Švecovs secured his spots in the men's event through the re-allocations of unused universality quota place.

Athlete	Event		Fencing (épée one touch)				Riding (show jumping)			Swimming (200 m freestyle)			Combined: shooting/running (10 m laser pistol)/(3000 m)			Total points	Final rank
Athlete	Event		RR	BR	Rank	MP points	Penalties	Rank	MP points	Time	Rank	MP points	Time	Rank	MP points	Total points	Final rank
Pāvels Švecovs	Men's	Semifinal	23–12	0	2	240	0	4	300	2:02.17	7	306	10:40.68	16	660	1506	5 Q
Pāvels Švecovs	Men's	Final	23–12	0	3	240	21	16	279	2:03.71	10	303	11:10.97	18	630	1452	17

== Shooting ==
Latvian shooters achieved quota places for the following events based on their results at the 2022 and 2023 ISSF World Championships, 2022, 2023, and 2024 European Championships, 2023 European Games, and 2024 ISSF World Olympic Qualification Tournament.

Athlete	Event	Qualification		Final	
Athlete	Event	Points	Rank	Points	Rank
Lauris Strautmanis	Men's 10 m air pistol	572	21	Did not advance	
Agate Rašmane	Women's 10 m air pistol	570	23	Did not advance	
Agate Rašmane	Women's 25 m pistol	576	26	Did not advance	
Lauris Strautmanis; Agate Rašmane	Mixed 10 m air pistol team	568	16	Did not advance	

== Swimming ==
Latvia received two Universality quota places in Swimming.

Athlete	Event	Heat		Semifinal		Final	
Athlete	Event	Time	Rank	Time	Rank	Time	Rank
Daniils Bobrovs	Men's 200 metre breaststroke	2:13.66	21	Did not advance			
Ieva Maļuka	Women's 200 metre individual medley	2:15.79	26	Did not advance			

== Tennis ==
After being listed as the top 64 eligible players based on the final WTA ranking for the Olympics, Latvia ensured their participation in the women's singles competition.

Athlete	Event	Round of 64	Round of 32	Round of 16	Quarterfinals	Semifinals	Final / BM	
Athlete	Event	Opposition Score	Opposition Score	Opposition Score	Opposition Score	Opposition Score	Opposition Score	Rank
Jeļena Ostapenko	Women's singles	Osorio (COL); L 4–6, 3–6	Did not advance					

== Volleyball ==
=== Beach ===
Latvian women's pair qualified for Paris based on the FIVB Beach Volleyball Olympic Ranking.

Athlete	Event	Preliminary round				Round of 16	Quarterfinals	Semifinals	Final / BM	
Athlete	Event	Opposition Score	Opposition Score	Opposition Score	Rank	Opposition Score	Opposition Score	Opposition Score	Opposition Score	Rank
Tīna Graudiņa; Anastasija Kravčenoka	Women's	Esmée / Zoé (SUI); L 0–2 (15–21, 14–21)	Poletti / Michelle (PAR); W 2–0 (21–19, 21–15)	Melissa / Brandie (CAN); W 2–0 (21–14, 22–20)	2	Müller / Tillmann (GER); W 2–1 (21–13, 17–21, 18–16)	Ana Patricia / Duda (BRA); L 0–2 (16–21, 10–21)	Did not advance		5

== Weightlifting ==
Latvia entered one weightlifter into the Olympic competition. Ritvars Suharevs (men's 73 kg) secured one of the top ten slots in his weight divisions based on the IWF Olympic Qualification Rankings.

Athlete	Event	Snatch		Clean & Jerk		Total	Rank
Athlete	Event	Result	Rank	Result	Rank	Total	Rank
Ritvars Suharevs	Men's −73 kg	~~147~~	DNF	—	–	—	DNF

== See also ==
- Latvia at the 2024 Winter Youth Olympics
