= Latvia at the 2020 Summer Olympics =

- IOC code: LAT
- NOC: Latvian Olympic Committee
- Website: www.olimpiade.lv (in Latvian and English)

in Tokyo, Japan
- Competitors: 33 in 14 sports
- Flag bearers (opening): Agnis Čavars; Jeļena Ostapenko
- Flag bearer (closing): Pāvels Švecovs
- Medals Ranked 59th: Gold 1 Silver 0 Bronze 1 Total 2

Summer Olympics appearances (overview)
- 1924; 1928; 1932; 1936; 1948–1988; 1992; 1996; 2000; 2004; 2008; 2012; 2016; 2020; 2024

Other related appearances
- Russian Empire (1908–1912); Soviet Union (1952–1988)

Latvia competed at the 2020 Summer Olympics in Tokyo. Originally scheduled to take place from 24 July to 9 August 2020, the Games were postponed to 23 July to 8 August 2021, because of the COVID-19 pandemic. It was the nation's eighth consecutive appearance at the Games and twelfth overall in Summer Olympic history.

After finishing with no medals five years prior, Latvia won two medals in Tokyo, with one of them being gold.

== Medalists ==
The following Latvian competitors won medals at the games. In the by discipline sections below, medalists' names are bolded.

Medal	Name	Sport	Event	Date
Gold	Latvia men's national 3x3 team: Agnis Čavars; Edgars Krūmiņš; Kārlis Lasmanis; Nauris Miezis	Basketball	Men's 3×3 tournament	July 28
Bronze	Artūrs Plēsnieks	Weightlifting	Men's 109 kg	August 3

== Competitors ==
The following is the list of number of competitors in the Games.

Sport	Men	Women	Total
Athletics	3	5	8
Basketball	4	0	4
Canoeing	1	0	1
Cycling	3	1	4
Equestrian	1	0	1
Judo	1	0	1
Karate	1	0	1
Modern pentathlon	1	0	1
Shooting	0	1	1
Swimming	1	1	2
Tennis	0	2	2
Volleyball	2	2	4
Weightlifting	2	0	2
Wrestling	0	1	1
Total	20	13	33

== Athletics ==
Latvian athletes further achieved the entry standards, either by qualifying time or by world ranking, in the following track and field events (up to a maximum of 3 athletes in each event):

Key

- Note–Ranks given for track events are within the athlete's heat only
- **Q** = Qualified for the next round
- **q** = Qualified for the next round as a fastest loser or, in field events, by position without achieving the qualifying target
- **NR** = National record
- N/A = Round not applicable for the event
- Bye = Athlete not required to compete in round

Track & road events

Athlete	Event	Heat		Semifinal		Final	
Athlete	Event	Result	Rank	Result	Rank	Result	Rank
Arnis Rumbenieks	Men's 50 km walk	—N/a				4:13:33	37
Ruslans Smolonskis	Men's 50 km walk	—N/a				DSQ	
Līga Velvere	Women's 800 m	DNF		Did not advance			

Field events

Athlete	Event	Qualification		Final	
Athlete	Event	Distance	Position	Distance	Position
Gatis Čakšs	Men's javelin throw	78.73	18	Did not advance	
Anete Kociņa	Women's javelin throw	58.84	22	Did not advance	
Līna Mūze	Women's javelin throw	57.33	26	Did not advance	
Madara Palameika	Women's javelin throw	60.94	12 **q**	58.70	11
Laura Igaune	Women's hammer throw	68.53	20	Did not advance	

== Basketball ==
Summary

Team	Event	Group stage								Quarterfinal	Semifinal	Final / BM	
Team	Event	Opposition Score	Opposition Score	Opposition Score	Opposition Score	Opposition Score	Opposition Score	Opposition Score	Rank	Opposition Score	Opposition Score	Opposition Score	Rank
**Latvia men's 3×3**	Men's 3×3 tournament	Poland; **W** 21–14	Belgium; **L** 20–21	China; **W** 18–17	Japan; **W** 21–18	Serbia; **L** 16–22	ROC; **L** 19–15	Netherlands; **W** 22–18	3	Japan; **W** 21–18	Belgium; **W** 21–8	ROC; **W** 21–18	1st place, gold medalist(s)

=== 3×3 basketball ===
==== Men's tournament ====
Latvia men's national 3x3 team qualified for the Games by winning a bronze medal at the 2021 FIBA Olympic Qualifying Tournament.

Team roster

The players were announced on 6 July 2021.

- Agnis Čavars
- Edgars Krūmiņš
- Kārlis Lasmanis
- Nauris Miezis

Group play

Pos	Team	Pld	W	L	PF	PA	PD	Qualification
1	Serbia	7	7	0	138	91	+47	Semifinals
2	Belgium	7	4 (Note: Belgium 2–0, Latvia 1–1, Netherlands 0–2)	3	126	127	−1	Semifinals
3	Latvia	7	4	3	133	129	+4	Quarterfinals
4	Netherlands	7	4	3	132	129	+3	Quarterfinals
5	ROC	7	3	4	116	125	−9	Quarterfinals
6	Japan (H)	7	2 (Note: Japan 1–1, 123 PS; Poland 1–1, 120 PS; China 1–1, 119 PS)	5	123	134	−11	Quarterfinals
7	Poland	7	2	5	120	130	−10	
8	China	7	2	5	119	142	−23	

Source: TOCOG and FIBA
Rules for classification: 1) Wins; 2) Head-to-head record; 3) Points scored.
(H) Hosts
Notes:

24 July 2021
11:35
v

Report

Poland	14–**21**	**Latvia**
Pts: Hicks 8		Pts: Miezis 7

Aomi Urban Sports Park, Tokyo
Referees: Markos Michaelides (SUI), Edmond Ho (HKG)

24 July 2021
18:40
v

Report

Latvia	20–**21**	**Belgium**
Pts: Lasmanis 11		Pts: Vervoort 11

Aomi Urban Sports Park, Tokyo
Referees: Markos Michaelides (SUI), Edmond Ho (HKG)

25 July 2021
15:00
v

Report

China	17–**18**	**Latvia**
Pts: Hu 12		Pts: Lasmanis 11

Aomi Urban Sports Park, Tokyo
Referees: Evgeny Ostrovskiy (RUS), Vlad Ghizdareanu (ROU)

25 July 2021
22:25
v

Report

**Latvia**	**21**–18	Japan
Pts: Lasmanis 7		Pts: Tominaga 9

Aomi Urban Sports Park, Tokyo
Referees: Edmond Ho (HKG), Marek Maliszewski (POL)

26 July 2021
15:25
v

Report

Latvia	16–**22**	**Serbia**
Pts: three players 5		Pts: Majstorović 11

Aomi Urban Sports Park, Tokyo
Referees: Edmond Ho (HKG), Marek Maliszewski (POL)

26 July 2021
22:00
v

Report

**ROC**	**19**–15	Latvia
Pts: Zuev 7		Pts: Lasmanis 6

Aomi Urban Sports Park, Tokyo
Referees: Vlad Ghizdareanu (ROU), Jasmina Juras (SRB)

27 July 2021
18:25
v

Report

**Latvia**	**22**–18	Netherlands
Pts: Miezis 9		Pts: Van der Horst 8

Aomi Urban Sports Park, Tokyo
Referees: Edmond Ho (HKG), Jasmina Juras (SRB)

Quarterfinal

27 July 2021
22:20
v

Report

**Latvia**	**21**–18	Japan
Pts: Krūmiņš 9		Pts: Tominaga 8

Aomi Urban Sports Park, Tokyo
Referees: Jasmina Juras (SRB), Marek Maliszewski (POL)

Semifinal

28 July 2021
18:40
v

Report

Belgium	8–**21**	**Latvia**
Pts: Vervoort 5		Pts: Lasmanis 9

Aomi Urban Sports Park, Tokyo
Referees: Edmond Ho (HKG), Markos Michaelides (SUI)

Gold medal match

28 July 2021
22:25
v

Report

ROC	18–**21**	**Latvia**
Pts: Karpenkov 7		Pts: Lasmanis 10

Aomi Urban Sports Park, Tokyo
Referees: Jasmina Juras (SRB), Markos Michaelides (SUI)

== Canoeing ==
=== Sprint ===
Latvia qualified a single boat (men's K-1 200 m) for the Games with a top-two finish at the 2021 European Canoe Sprint Qualification Regatta in Szeged, Hungary.

Athlete	Event	Heats		Quarterfinals		Semifinals		Final	
Athlete	Event	Time	Rank	Time	Rank	Time	Rank	Time	Rank
Roberts Akmens	Men's K-1 200 m	35.448	2 **SF**	Bye		35.688	4 **FA**	36.014	8

Qualification Legend: FA = Qualify to final (medal); FB = Qualify to final B (non-medal)

== Cycling ==
=== Road ===
Latvia entered two riders to compete in the men's Olympic road race, by virtue of their top 32 national finish (for men) in the UCI World Ranking.

Athlete	Event	Time	Rank
Krists Neilands	Men's road race	6:15:38	33
Toms Skujiņš	Men's road race	6:11:46	22
Toms Skujiņš	Men's time trial	1:02:04.93	30

=== BMX ===
Latvia received two quota places (one per gender) for BMX at the Olympics by topping the field of nations vying for qualification in the men's race at the 2019 UCI BMX World Championships and by finishing among the top three nations for women in the UCI BMX Individual Ranking List of June 1, 2021.

Race

Athlete	Event	Quarterfinal		Semifinal		Final	
Athlete	Event	Points	Rank	Points	Rank	Result	Rank
Helvijs Babris	Men's race	15	5	Did not advance			
Vineta Pētersone	Women's race	16	6	Did not advance			

== Equestrian ==
Latvia entered one jumping rider into the Olympic competition by finishing in the top two, outside the group selection, of the individual FEI Olympic Rankings for Group C (Central and Eastern Europe), marking the country's debut in the sport.

=== Jumping ===
Athlete	Horse	Event	Qualification		Final		
Athlete	Horse	Event	Penalties	Rank	Penalties	Time	Rank
Kristaps Neretnieks	Valour	Individual	0	=1 **Q**	13	88.75	23

== Judo ==
Latvia qualified one judoka for the men's half-heavyweight category (100 kg) at the Games. Two-time Olympian Jevgeņijs Borodavko accepted a continental berth from the European zone as the nation's top-ranked judoka outside of direct qualifying position in the IJF World Ranking List of June 28, 2021.

Athlete	Event	Round of 32	Round of 16	Quarterfinals	Semifinals	Repechage	Final / BM	
Athlete	Event	Opposition Result	Opposition Result	Opposition Result	Opposition Result	Opposition Result	Opposition Result	Rank
Jevgeņijs Borodavko	Men's −100 kg	Cirjenics (HUN); **L** FUS	Did not advance					

== Karate ==
Latvia entered one karateka into the inaugural Olympic tournament. 2019 European Games champion Kalvis Kalniņš secured a place in the men's kumite 67-kg category, as the highest-ranked karateka vying for qualification from the European zone based on the WKD Olympic Rankings.

Kumite

Athlete	Event	Group stage					Semifinals	Final	
Athlete	Event	Opposition Result	Opposition Result	Opposition Result	Opposition Result	Rank	Opposition Result	Opposition Result	Rank
Kalvis Kalniņš	Men's –67 kg	Al-Masatfa (JOR); **L** 3–8	Madera (VEN); **W** 4–2	Da Costa (FRA); **L** 2–11	Derafshipour (EOR); **L** 3–5	4	Did not advance		

== Modern pentathlon ==
Latvia entered one modern pentathlete into the Olympic competition. Pāvels Švecovs finished last of the top eight modern pentathletes vying for qualification in the men's event based on the UIPM World Rankings of June 1, 2021.

Athlete	Event	Fencing (épée one touch)				Swimming (200 m freestyle)			Riding (show jumping)			Combined: shooting/running (10 m air pistol)/(3200 m)			Total points	Final rank
Athlete	Event	RR	BR	Rank	MP points	Time	Rank	MP points	Time	Rank	MP points	Time	Rank	MP points	Total points	Final rank
Pāvels Švecovs	Men's	22-13	2	7	234	1:59.83	10	311	81.97	16	285	11:40.67	26	600	1430	14

== Shooting ==
Latvia granted an invitation from ISSF to send 2014 Youth Olympic bronze medalist Agate Rašmane (women's 25 m pistol) to the rescheduled Games as the highest-ranked shooter vying for qualification in the ISSF World Olympic Rankings of 6 June 2021.

Athlete	Event	Qualification		Final	
Athlete	Event	Points	Rank	Points	Rank
Agate Rašmane	Women's 10 m air pistol	573	19	Did not advance	
Agate Rašmane	Women's 25 m pistol	569	37	Did not advance	

== Swimming ==
Latvia received a universality invitation from FINA to send two top-ranked swimmers (one per gender) in their respective individual events to the Olympics, based on the FINA Points System of June 28, 2021.

Athlete	Event	Heat		Semifinal		Final	
Athlete	Event	Time	Rank	Time	Rank	Time	Rank
Daniils Bobrovs	Men's 200 m breaststroke	2:14.25	31	Did not advance			
Ieva Maļuka	Women's 100 m freestyle	56.39	37	Did not advance			
Ieva Maļuka	Women's 200 m freestyle	2:03.75	24	Did not advance			

== Tennis ==
Latvia entered two tennis players into the Olympic tournament. Rio 2016 Olympian Jeļena Ostapenko (world no. 43) and rookie Anastasija Sevastova (world no. 57) qualified directly among the top 56 eligible players for the women's singles based on the WTA World Rankings of June 13, 2021.

Athlete	Event	Round of 64	Round of 32	Round of 16	Quarterfinals	Semifinals	Final / BM	
Athlete	Event	Opposition Score	Opposition Score	Opposition Score	Opposition Score	Opposition Score	Opposition Score	Rank
Jeļena Ostapenko	Women's singles	Vesnina (ROC); **L** 4–6, 7–6^{(7–2)}, 4–6	Did not advance					
Anastasija Sevastova	Women's singles	Ferro (FRA); **L** 6–2, 4–6, 2–6	Did not advance					
Jeļena Ostapenko; Anastasija Sevastova	Women's doubles	—N/a	Perez / Stosur (AUS); **L** 6–4, 1–6, [5–10]	Did not advance				

== Volleyball ==
=== Beach ===
Latvia men's and women's beach volleyball pairs qualified for the Games by advancing to the final match and securing an outright berth at the 2019 FIVB World Olympic Qualifying Tournament in Haiyang, China.

Athlete	Event	Preliminary round				Repechage	Round of 16	Quarterfinals	Semifinals	Final / BM	
Athlete	Event	Opposition Score	Opposition Score	Opposition Score	Rank	Opposition Score	Opposition Score	Opposition Score	Opposition Score	Opposition Score	Rank
Mārtiņš Pļaviņš; Edgars Točs	Men's	Perušič / Schweiner (CZE); **W** (21–0, 21–0)	Krasilnikov / Stoyanovskiy (ROC); **W** (13–21, 21–19, 15–11)	Gaxiola / Rubio (MEX); **L** (18–21, 16–21)	2 **Q**	Bye	Evandro / Schmidt (BRA); **W** (21–19, 21–18)	Alison / Álvaro (BRA); **W** (21–16, 21–19)	Mol / Sørum (NOR); **L** (15–21, 16–21)	Ahmed / Cherif (QAT); **L** (12–21, 18–21)	4
Tina Graudiņa; Anastasija Kravčenoka	Women's	Claes / Sponcil (USA); **L** (13–21, 21–16, 11–15)	Ana Patrícia / Rebecca (BRA); **W** (21–15, 12–21, 15–12)	Khadambi / Makokha (KEN); **W** (21–6, 21–14)	2 **Q**	Bye	Kholomina / Makroguzova (ROC); **W** (16–21, 21–17, 15–13)	Bansley / Wilkerson (CAN); **W** (21–13, 18–21, 15–11)	Artacho / Clancy (AUS); **L** (21–23, 13–21)	Heidrich / Vergé-Dépré (SUI); **L** (19–21, 15–21)	4

== Weightlifting ==
Latvia entered two weightlifters into the Olympic competition. 2018 junior world champion Ritvars Suharevs (men's 81 kg) and two-time Olympian Artūrs Plēsnieks (men's 109 kg) secured one of the top eight slots each in their respective weight divisions based on the IWF Absolute World Rankings.

Athlete	Event	Snatch		Clean & Jerk		Total	Rank
Athlete	Event	Result	Rank	Result	Rank	Total	Rank
Ritvars Suharevs	Men's –81 kg	163	5	195	6	358	6
**Artūrs Plēsnieks**	Men's –109 kg	180	7	230	2	410	3rd place, bronze medalist(s)

== Wrestling ==
Latvia qualified one wrestler for the women's freestyle 62 kg into the Olympic competition, by progressing to the top two finals at the 2021 European Qualification Tournament in Budapest, Hungary.

Key:

- VT (ranking points: 5–0 or 0–5) – Victory by fall.
- VB (ranking points: 5–0 or 0–5) – Victory by injury (VF for forfeit, VA for withdrawal or disqualification)
- PP (ranking points: 3–1 or 1–3) – Decision by points – the loser with technical points.
- PO (ranking points: 3–0 or 0–3) – Decision by points – the loser without technical points.
- ST (ranking points: 4–0 or 0–4) – Great superiority – the loser without technical points and a margin of victory of at least 8 (Greco-Roman) or 10 (freestyle) points.
- SP (ranking points: 4–1 or 1–4) – Technical superiority – the loser with technical points and a margin of victory of at least 8 (Greco-Roman) or 10 (freestyle) points.

Freestyle

Athlete	Event	Round of 16	Quarterfinal	Semifinal	Repechage	Final / BM	
Athlete	Event	Opposition Result	Opposition Result	Opposition Result	Opposition Result	Opposition Result	Rank
Anastasija Grigorjeva	Women's −62 kg	Tynybekova (KGZ); **L** 0–3 ^{PO}	Did not advance		Incze (ROU); **W** 3–1 ^{PP}	Koliadenko (UKR); **L** 1–3 ^{PP}	5

== See also ==
- Latvia at the 2020 Summer Paralympics
