= 2026 FIBA 3x3 World Cup =

Mistrzostwa Świata w Koszykówce 3x3 2026

Tournament details
- Host country: Poland
- City: Warsaw
- Dates: 1–7 June
- Teams: 40 (from 5 confederations)
- Venue: 1 (in 1 host city)

The 2026 FIBA 3x3 World Cup was an international 3x3 basketball event that featured competitions for men's and women's national teams. The tournament was held between 1 and 7 June 2026 in Warsaw, Poland.

== Medal summary ==
=== Medal table ===
* Host nation (Poland)

Rank	Nation	Gold	Silver	Bronze	Total
1	Latvia	1	0	0	1
1	United States	1	0	0	1
3	Australia	0	1	0	1
3	Germany	0	1	0	1
5	Netherlands	0	0	1	1
5	Serbia	0	0	1	1
Totals (6 entries)		2	2	2	6

=== Medalists ===
Event	Gold	Silver	Bronze
Men	Latvia; Francis Lācis; Kārlis Lasmanis; Nauris Miezis; Zigmārs Raimo	Germany; Denzel Agyeman; Kevin Bryant; Fabian Giessmann; Niklas Kropp	Serbia; Nemanja Barać; Andreja Milutinović; Nenad Neranđić; Strahinja Stojačić
Women	United States; Joyce Edwards; MiLaysia Fulwiley; Mikaylah Williams; Serah Williams	Australia; Amy Atwell; Emma Clarke; Hannah Hank; Marena Whittle	Netherlands; Noortje Driessen; Ilse Kuijt; Zoë Slagter; Lotte van Kruistum
