= Latvia at the Olympics =

- IOC code: LAT
- NOC: Latvian Olympic Committee
- Website: www.olimpiade.lv (in Latvian and English)
- Medals Ranked 72nd: Gold 5 Silver 15 Bronze 13 Total 33

Summer appearances
- 1924; 1928; 1932; 1936; 1948–1988; 1992; 1996; 2000; 2004; 2008; 2012; 2016; 2020; 2024

Winter appearances
- 1924; 1928; 1932; 1936; 1948–1988; 1992; 1994; 1998; 2002; 2006; 2010; 2014; 2018; 2022; 2026

Other related appearances
- Russian Empire (1908–1912); Soviet Union (1952–1988)

Latvia first participated at the Olympic Games in 1924. After the nation was occupied by the Soviet Union in 1940, Latvian athletes competed for the USSR between 1948 and 1988. After the independence of Latvia and the dissolution of the Soviet Union in 1991, the nation returned to the Olympic Games in 1992 and has competed at every Games since then.

Latvian athletes have won a total of 21 medals at the Summer Olympic Games and 12 medals at the Winter Olympic Games. They have won a remarkably high proportion of silver medals, with 5 gold medals. These totals do not include medals won by Latvian athletes while competing for the Soviet Union.

The National Olympic Committee for Latvia was first created in 1922. The current NOC is the Latvian Olympic Committee, which was recognized by the International Olympic Committee in 1991.

== Medal tables ==
=== Medals by Summer Games ===
Games	Athletes	Gold	Silver	Bronze	Total	Rank
1900–1912	as part of the Russian Empire					
(Belgium) 1920 Antwerp	did not participate					
(France) 1924 Paris	36	0	0	0	0	–
(Netherlands) 1928 Amsterdam	17	0	0	0	0	–
(United States) 1932 Los Angeles	4	0	1	0	1	22
(Nazi Germany) 1936 Berlin	17	0	1	1	2	24
1948–1988	occupied by the Soviet Union					
(Spain) 1992 Barcelona	31	0	2	1	3	40
(United States) 1996 Atlanta	47	0	1	0	1	61
(Australia) 2000 Sydney	45	1	1	1	3	44
(Greece) 2004 Athens	31	0	4	0	4	58
(China) 2008 Beijing	50	1	1	1	3	45
(United Kingdom) 2012 London	46	1	0	1	2	49
(Brazil) 2016 Rio de Janeiro	34	0	0	0	0	–
(Japan) 2020 Tokyo	33	1	0	1	2	59
(France) 2024 Paris	29	0	0	0	0	–
(United States) 2028 Los Angeles	future event					
(Australia) 2032 Brisbane	future event					
Total		4	11	6	21	73

=== Medals by Winter Games ===
Games	Athletes	Gold	Silver	Bronze	Total	Rank
(France) 1924 Chamonix	2	0	0	0	0	–
(Switzerland) 1928 St. Moritz	1	0	0	0	0	–
(United States) 1932 Lake Placid	did not participate					
1936 Garmisch-Partenkirchen	26	0	0	0	0	–
1948–1988	occupied by the Soviet Union					
(France) 1992 Albertville	23	0	0	0	0	–
(Norway) 1994 Lillehammer	27	0	0	0	0	–
(Japan) 1998 Nagano	29	0	0	0	0	–
(United States) 2002 Salt Lake City	47	0	0	0	0	–
(Italy) 2006 Turin	57	0	0	1	1	26
(Canada) 2010 Vancouver	58	0	2	0	2	23
(Russia) 2014 Sochi	58	1	1	3	5	19
(South Korea) 2018 Pyeongchang	34	0	0	1	1	25
(China) 2022 Beijing	60	0	0	1	1	27
(Italy) 2026 Milano Cortina	67	0	1	1	2	24
(France) 2030 French Alps	future event					
(United States) 2034 Utah	future event					
Total		1	4	7	12	38

=== Medals by summer sport ===
Sport	Gold	Silver	Bronze	Total
Cycling	2	0	1	3
Gymnastics	1	1	0	2
3x3 basketball	1	0	0	1
Athletics	0	4	1	5
Canoeing	0	2	0	2
Weightlifting	0	1	2	3
Modern pentathlon	0	1	0	1
Shooting	0	1	0	1
Wrestling	0	1	0	1
Beach volleyball	0	0	1	1
Judo	0	0	1	1
Totals (11 entries)	4	11	6	21

=== Medals by winter sport ===
Sport	Gold	Silver	Bronze	Total
Bobsleigh	1	0	2	3
Luge	0	2	4	6
Skeleton	0	2	0	2
Short track speed skating	0	0	1	1
Totals (4 entries)	1	4	7	12

=== Other ===
- Latvian sports shooter Haralds Blaus won bronze in the 1912 Olympics as a member of the Russian Empire team.

== List of medalists ==
=== Summer Olympics ===
Medal	Name	Games	Sport	Event
Silver	Jānis Daliņš	1932 Los Angeles	Athletics	Men's 50 km walk
Silver	Edvīns Bietags	1936 Berlin	Wrestling	Men's Greco-Roman light heavyweight
Bronze	Adalberts Bubenko	1936 Berlin	Athletics	Men's 50 km walk
Silver	Ivans Klementjevs	1992 Barcelona	Canoeing	Men's C-1 1000 metres
Silver	Afanasijs Kuzmins	1992 Barcelona	Shooting	Men's 25 m rapid fire pistol
Bronze	Dainis Ozols	1992 Barcelona	Cycling (Road)	Men's individual race
Silver	Ivans Klementjevs	1996 Atlanta	Canoeing	Men's C-1 1000 metres
Gold	Igors Vihrovs	2000 Sydney	Gymnastics	Men's floor exercises
Silver	Aigars Fadejevs	2000 Sydney	Athletics	Men's 50 km walk
Bronze	Vsevolods Zeļonijs	2000 Sydney	Judo	Men's lightweight
Silver	Vadims Vasiļevskis	2004 Athens	Athletics	Men's javelin throw
Silver	Jevgēņijs Saproņenko	2004 Athens	Gymnastics	Men's vault
Silver	Jeļena Rubļevska	2004 Athens	Modern pentathlon	Women's individual
Silver	Viktors Ščerbatihs	2004 Athens	Weightlifting	Men's super heavyweight
Gold	Māris Štrombergs	2008 Beijing	Cycling (BMX)	Men's BMX
Silver	Ainārs Kovals	2008 Beijing	Athletics	Men's javelin throw
Bronze	Viktors Ščerbatihs	2008 Beijing	Weightlifting	Men's super heavyweight
Gold	Māris Štrombergs	2012 London	Cycling (BMX)	Men's BMX
Bronze	Mārtiņš Pļaviņš; Jānis Šmēdiņš	2012 London	Beach volleyball	Men's tournament
Gold	Agnis Čavars; Edgars Krūmiņš; Kārlis Lasmanis; Nauris Miezis	2020 Tokyo	3x3 basketball	Men's 3x3 basketball
Bronze	Artūrs Plēsnieks	2020 Tokyo	Weightlifting	Men's heavyweight

=== Winter Olympics ===
Medal	Name	Games	Sport	Event
Bronze	Mārtiņš Rubenis	2006 Turin	Luge	Men's singles
Silver	Andris Šics; Juris Šics	2010 Vancouver	Luge	Doubles
Silver	Martins Dukurs	2010 Vancouver	Skeleton	Men's
Gold	Daumants Dreiškens; Oskars Melbārdis; Jānis Strenga; Arvis Vilkaste	2014 Sochi	Bobsleigh	Four-man
Silver	Martins Dukurs	2014 Sochi	Skeleton	Men's
Bronze	Andris Šics; Juris Šics	2014 Sochi	Luge	Doubles
Bronze	Mārtiņš Rubenis; Andris Šics; Juris Šics; Elīza Tīruma	2014 Sochi	Luge	Team relay
Bronze	Daumants Dreiškens; Oskars Melbārdis	2014 Sochi	Bobsleigh	Two-man
Bronze	Oskars Melbārdis; Jānis Strenga	2018 Pyeongchang	Bobsleigh	Two–man
Bronze	Kristers Aparjods; Mārtiņš Bots; Roberts Plūme; Elīza Tīruma	2022 Beijing	Luge	Team relay
Silver	Elīna Ieva Bota	2026 Milano Cortina	Luge	Women's singles
Bronze	Roberts Krūzbergs	2026 Milano Cortina	Short-track speed skating	Men's 1500 metres

== List of gold medal winners ==
No.	Name	Sport	Year
Under the Soviet Union
1	Inese Jaunzeme	Javelin throw	1956
2	Elvīra Ozoliņa	Javelin throw	1960
3	Ivans Bugajenkovs	Volleyball	1964
4	Staņislavs Lugailo	Volleyball	1964
5	Ivans Bugajenkovs	Volleyball	1968
6	Oļegs Antropovs	Volleyball	1968
7	Jānis Lūsis	Javelin throw	1968
8	Tatjana Veinberga	Volleyball	1968
9	Uļjana Semjonova	Basketball	1976
10	Tamāra Dauniene	Basketball	1976
11	Vera Zozuļa	Luge	1980
12	Uļjana Semjonova	Basketball	1980
13	Dainis Kūla	Javelin throw	1980
14	Pāvels Seļivanovs	Volleyball	1980
15	Aleksandrs Muzičenko	Sailing	1980
16	Jānis Ķipurs	Bobsleigh	1988
17	Vitālijs Samoilovs	Ice hockey	1988
18	Afanasijs Kuzmins	Shooting	1988
19	Ivans Klementjevs	Canoeing	1988
20	Natālija Laščonova	Gymnastics	1988
21	Igors Miglinieks	Basketball	1988
Independent Latvia
22	Igors Vihrovs	Gymnastics	2000
23	Māris Štrombergs	BMX	2008
24	Māris Štrombergs	BMX	2012
25-28	Daumants Dreiškens; Oskars Melbārdis; Jānis Strenga; Arvis Vilkaste	Bobsleigh; Four-man	2014
29-32	Agnis Čavars; Edgars Krūmiņš; Kārlis Lasmanis; Nauris Miezis	3x3 basketball	2020

== Notes ==
At the 2010 Winter Olympics, Haralds Silovs became the first athlete in Olympic history to participate in both short track (1500m) and long track (5000m) speed skating, and the first to compete in two different disciplines on the same day.

== See also ==
- List of flag bearers for Latvia at the Olympics
- Category:Olympic competitors for Latvia
- Latvia at the Paralympics
