= List of flag bearers for Latvia at the Olympics =

Latvia at the Olympics
- IOC code: LAT
- NOC: Latvian Olympic Committee
- Website: www.olimpiade.lv (in Latvian and English)
- Medals: Gold 5 Silver 14 Bronze 12 Total 31

Summer appearances
- 1924; 1928; 1932; 1936; 1948–1988; 1992; 1996; 2000; 2004; 2008; 2012; 2016; 2020; 2024

Winter appearances
- 1924; 1928; 1932; 1936; 1948–1988; 1992; 1994; 1998; 2002; 2006; 2010; 2014; 2018; 2022; 2026; 2030

Other related appearances
- Russian Empire (1908–1912); Soviet Union (1952–1988)

This is a list of flag bearers who have represented Latvia at the Olympics.

Flag bearers carry the national flag of their country at the opening ceremony of the Olympic Games.

#	Event year	Season	Flag bearer	Sport
1	1924	Winter	Roberts Plūme	Cross-country skiing
2	1924	Summer	Arvīds Ķibilds	Athletics
3	1928	Winter	Alberts Rumba	Speed skating
4	1928	Summer	Alberts Zvejnieks	Wrestling
5	1932	Summer	Jānis Dimza	Athletics
6	1936	Winter	Leonīds Vedējs	Ice hockey
7	1936	Summer	Haralds Marvē	Shooting
8	1992	Winter	Jānis Ķipurs	Bobsleigh
9	1992	Summer	Raimonds Bergmanis	Weightlifting
10	1994	Winter	Zintis Ekmanis	Bobsleigh
11	1996	Summer	Einārs Tupurītis	Athletics
12	1998	Winter	Sandis Prūsis	Bobsleigh
13	2000	Summer	Voldemārs Lūsis	Athletics
14	2002	Winter	Harijs Vītoliņš	Ice hockey
15	2004	Summer	Vadims Vasiļevskis	Athletics
16	2006	Winter	Artūrs Irbe	Ice hockey
17	2008	Summer	Vadims Vasiļevskis	Athletics
18	2010	Winter	Martins Dukurs	Skeleton
19	2012	Summer	Mārtiņš Pļaviņš	Beach volleyball
20	2014	Winter	Sandis Ozoliņš	Ice hockey
21	2016	Summer	Māris Štrombergs	Cycling
22	2018	Winter	Daumants Dreiškens	Bobsleigh
23	2020	Summer	Agnis Čavars	3x3 basketball
23	2020	Summer	Jeļena Ostapenko	Tennis
24	2022	Winter	Lauris Dārziņš	Ice hockey
24	2022	Winter	Elīza Tīruma	Luge
25	2024	Summer	Nauris Miezis	3x3 basketball
25	2024	Summer	Tīna Graudiņa	Beach volleyball

== See also ==
- Latvia at the Olympics
