= Krūmiņš =

Origin
- Origin: Latvian
- Meaning: "little bush"

Krūmiņš (Old orthography: Kru(h)min; feminine: Krūmiņa) is a Latvian topographic surname, derived from the Latvian word for "bush" (krūms) Individuals with the surname include:

- Edgars Krūmiņš (1909–unknown), Latvian chess master
- Edgars Krūmiņš (born 1985), Latvian basketball player
- Hugo Teodors Krūmiņš (1901–1990), Latvian writer
- Jānis Krūmiņš (1930–1994), Latvian basketball player
- Mārtiņš Krūmiņš (1900–1992), Latvian-born American painter
- Susan Krumins (née Kuijken; 1986), Dutch athlete
