= Krūmiņa =

Family name

Origin
- Origin: Latvia
- Meaning: "little bush"

Krūmiņa (masculine: Krūmiņš) is a Latvian topographic surname, derived from the Latvian word for "bush" (krūms). Individuals with the surname include:

- Elita Krūmiņa (born 1965), auditor general of Latvia
- Ivita Krūmiņa (born 1981), Latvian ice hockey player
- Marta Krūmiņa-Vitrupe (1908–2010), Latvian poet, writer and chess master
- Gerda Krūmiņa (born 1984), Latvian biathlete player
- Linda Krūmiņa (born 1984), Latvian chess player
