= Miezis =

Miezis (feminine: Mieze) is a Latvian masculine surname meaning "barley". Notable people with the surname include:

- Gvido Miezis (born 1980), Latvian cyclist
- Nauris Miezis (born 1991), Latvian basketball player
- Normunds Miezis (born 1971), Latvian chess player
