= Ivita =

Female given name

- Gender: Female
- Name day: 28 December

Origin
- Region of origin: Latvia

Ivita is a Latvian feminine given name. The associated name day is December 28.

== Notable people named Ivita ==
- Ivita Burmistre, Latvian economist and diplomat
- Ivita Krūmiņa (born 1981), Latvian ice hockey player
