= Elise Vogel =

Latvian chess player

Personal information
- Born: Elise Johanna Vogel; June 26, 1895 Riga
- Died: unknown

Chess career
- Country: Latvia

Elise Johanna Vogel (Latvian: Elīza Johanna Fogele, née Kalsing; 26 June 1895 – date of death unknown) was a Latvian chess player of Baltic German origin.

== Biography ==
The German newspaper "Rigasches Stadtblätter" preserved the news that Elise Johanna Kalsing christened the Riga Cathedral at end of July 1895. In April 1928 she married with clerk Johannes Vogel and adopted her husband's last name.

In the 1930s Vogel was one of the first Latvian women chess players to successfully participate in the Latvian women's chess championships and others chess tournaments, including men's competitions. In 1937 she divided first place with Milda Lauberte in foundation Latvian women's chess championship (both players have 8,5 points from 9) but lost an additional match with 0:4. In 1938 at second Latvian women's chess championship Vogel divided first place with Emīlija Šmite and Marta Krūmiņa. In 1939 she won Latvian women's chess championship additional tournament and become a second Latvian women chess master. In the same year, Vogel won Latvian Chamber of Labour women's tournament and with German workers union team become Latvian Chamber of Labour team tournament winner and won first place on her Board 7 in the men's competition. In December 1939 she participated in the Latvian Chess Union Class A classification tournament, where draw with Karlis Ozols. It was the last known Vogel chess tournament.

In December 1939 her husband Johannes Vogel due to Baltic German repatriation to Germany have been released from the Latvian citizenship. Vogel family were resettled from Latvia by early 1940.

During World War II in December 1943, Vogel name last appeared in a newspaper in connection with the funeral of her father, Robert Kalsing. The information about her year of death is missing.
