= Latvia at the 2016 Summer Olympics =

- IOC code: LAT
- NOC: Latvian Olympic Committee
- Website: www.olimpiade.lv (in Latvian and English)

in Rio de Janeiro
- Competitors: 33 in 12 sports
- Flag bearers: Māris Štrombergs (opening); Aleksejs Rumjancevs (closing)
- Medals: Gold 0 Silver 0 Bronze 0 Total 0

Summer Olympics appearances (overview)
- 1924; 1928; 1932; 1936; 1948–1988; 1992; 1996; 2000; 2004; 2008; 2012; 2016; 2020; 2024

Other related appearances
- Russian Empire (1908–1912); Soviet Union (1952–1988)

Latvia competed at the 2016 Summer Olympics in Rio de Janeiro, Brazil, from 5 to 21 August 2016. This was the nation's seventh consecutive appearance at the Games in the post-Soviet era and eleventh overall in Summer Olympic history.

The Latvian Olympic Committee sent the nation's smallest delegation to the Olympics since 2004, with 33 athletes, 20 men and 13 women, competing across 12 sports. Latvia made its Olympic debut in women's tennis and women's weightlifting, as well as its return to sailing after 12 years. Athletics had the largest team by sport with only 14 competitors, nearly half of the nation's full roster size; along with sailing and tennis, there was also a single competitor each in modern pentathlon, shooting, and wrestling.

The Latvian roster featured two returning Olympic medalists from London, namely beach volleyball player Jānis Šmēdiņš and two-time defending BMX champion Maris Strombergs. Hunting for his third consecutive gold medal in Rio de Janeiro, Strombergs was selected to lead the Latvian delegation as the flag bearer in the opening ceremony. Distance runner Jeļena Prokopčuka came out of retirement to run for the women's marathon at her fourth Games as the oldest (aged 40) and most experienced competitor, while windsurfer Ketija Birzule and weightlifter Rebeka Koha (women's 53 kg) entered their maiden Games as the youngest athletes (both 18) of the roster. Other notable Latvian athletes included heptathlete and 2015 world bronze medalist Laura Ikauniece-Admidiņa, reigning European javelin throw champion Zigismunds Sirmais, and world-ranked freestyle wrestler Anastasija Grigorjeva.

Latvia failed to win a single medal for the first time in Olympic history since its independence from the Soviet Union in 1991. Koha, Ikauniece-Admidiņa, and sprint kayaker Aleksejs Rumjancevs produced the strongest results for the Latvians at these Games, finishing among the top five in their respective sporting events.

== Athletics ==
Latvian athletes achieved qualifying standards in the following athletics events (up to a maximum of 3 athletes in each event):

Key

- Note–Ranks given for track events are within the athlete's heat only
- Q = Qualified for the next round
- q = Qualified for the next round as a fastest loser or, in field events, by position without achieving the qualifying target
- NR = National record
- N/A = Round not applicable for the event
- Bye = Athlete not required to compete in round

Track & road events
Men

Athlete	Event	Final	
Athlete	Event	Result	Rank
Valērijs Žolnerovičs	Marathon	DNS	
Arnis Rumbenieks	50 km walk	4:08:28	37

Women

Athlete	Event	Heat		Semifinal		Final	
Athlete	Event	Result	Rank	Result	Rank	Result	Rank
Gunta Latiševa-Čudare	400 m	53.08	7	Did not advance			
Ariana Hilborn	Marathon	—				2:50:51	106
Ilona Marhele	Marathon	—				2:41:02	61
Jeļena Prokopčuka	Marathon	—				2:29:32	12
Agnese Pastare	20 km walk	—				1:40:15	53

Field events

Athlete	Event	Qualification		Final	
Athlete	Event	Distance	Position	Distance	Position
Mareks Ārents	Men's pole vault	5.45	=16	Did not advance	
Pauls Pujāts	Men's pole vault	5.60	=10 q	NM	—
Zigismunds Sirmais	Men's javelin throw	80.65	14	Did not advance	
Rolands Štrobinders	Men's javelin throw	77.73	28	Did not advance	
Sinta Ozoliņa-Kovala	Women's javelin throw	60.92	14	Did not advance	
Madara Palameika	Women's javelin throw	63.03	8 Q	60.14	10

Combined events – Women's heptathlon

Athlete	Event	100H	HJ	SP	200 m	LJ	JT	800 m	Final	Rank
Laura Ikauniece-Admidiņa	Result	13.33	1.77	13.52	23.76	6.12	55.93	2:09.43	6617	4
Laura Ikauniece-Admidiņa	Points	1075	941	762	1004	887	975	973	6617	4

== Canoeing ==
=== Sprint ===
Latvia has qualified a single boat in men's K-1 200 m for the Games at the 2016 European Qualification Regatta in Duisburg, Germany, either by winning his event or when the quota place for his event passed to the highest finisher not qualified Meanwhile, an unused men's C-1 1000 m boat was awarded to the Latvian canoeing team, as a response to the "multiple positive cases" of doping on Belarus and Romania.

Athlete	Event	Heats		Semifinals		Final	
Athlete	Event	Time	Rank	Time	Rank	Time	Rank
Dagnis Iļjins	Men's C-1 200 m	44.125	5 Q	45.082	7	Did not advance	
Dagnis Iļjins	Men's C-1 1000 m	4:11.766	4 Q	4:20.181	6 FB	4:10.084	13
Aleksejs Rumjancevs	Men's K-1 200 m	35.175	4 Q	34.722	4 FA	35.891	5

Qualification Legend: FA = Qualify to final (medal); FB = Qualify to final B (non-medal)

== Cycling ==
=== Road ===
Latvian riders qualified for a maximum of two quota places in the men's Olympic road race by virtue of their top 15 final national ranking in the 2015 UCI Europe Tour.

Athlete	Event	Time	Rank
Aleksejs Saramotins	Men's road race	6:30:05	46
Toms Skujiņš	Men's road race	6:30:05	55

=== BMX ===
Latvian riders qualified for two men's quota places in BMX at the Olympics, as a result of the nation's sixth-place finish in the UCI Olympic Ranking List of May 31, 2016. Two-time defending BMX champion Māris Štrombergs and London 2012 Olympian Edžus Treimanis were selected to the Latvian team.

Athlete	Event	Seeding		Quarterfinal		Semifinal		Final	
Athlete	Event	Result	Rank	Points	Rank	Points	Rank	Result	Rank
Māris Štrombergs	Men's BMX	34.953	7	14	5	Did not advance			
Edžus Treimanis	Men's BMX	DNF		15	5	Did not advance			

== Judo ==
Latvia has qualified two judokas for each of the following weight classes at the Games. Remarkably going to his third Olympics, Jevgeņijs Borodavko was ranked among the top 22 eligible judokas for men in the IJF World Ranking List of May 30, 2016, while Artūrs Ņikiforenko at men's heavyweight (+100 kg) earned a continental quota spot from the European region, as the highest-ranked Latvian judoka outside of direct qualifying position.

Athlete	Event	Round of 64	Round of 32	Round of 16	Quarterfinals	Semifinals	Repechage	Final / BM	
Athlete	Event	Opposition Result	Opposition Result	Opposition Result	Opposition Result	Opposition Result	Opposition Result	Opposition Result	Rank
Jevgeņijs Borodavko	Men's −100 kg	Bye	Haga (JPN); L 000–100	Did not advance					
Artūrs Ņikiforenko	Men's +100 kg	—	Kokauri (AZE); L 000–111	Did not advance					

== Modern pentathlon ==
Latvia has qualified one modern pentathlete for the men's event at the Games. Following the exclusion of the Russian athletes as a response to their previous doping cases, Ukrainian-born Ruslans Nakoņečnijs received a spare berth as the next highest-ranked eligible modern pentathlete, not yet qualified, in the UIPM World Rankings.

Athlete	Event	Fencing (épée one touch)				Swimming (200 m freestyle)			Riding (show jumping)			Combined: shooting/running (10 m air pistol)/(3200 m)			Total points	Final rank
Athlete	Event	RR	BR	Rank	MP points	Time	Rank	MP points	Penalties	Rank	MP points	Time	Rank	MP Points	Total points	Final rank
Ruslans Nakoņečnijs	Men's	13–22	2	30	180	2:03.83	16	329	28	26	272	11:35.70	21	605	1386	28

== Sailing ==
Latvia has received a spare Olympic berth from the International Sailing Federation to send a windsurfer competing in the women's RS:X class to the Olympic regatta, signifying the nation's Olympic return to the sport for the first time since 2004.

Athlete	Event	Race													Net points	Final rank
Athlete	Event	1	2	3	4	5	6	7	8	9	10	11	12	M*	Net points	Final rank
Ketija Birzule	Women's RS:X	24	24	~~DNF~~	21	24	26	DNF	25	23	18	21	23	EL	256	24

M = Medal race; EL = Eliminated – did not advance into the medal race

== Shooting ==
Latvia has received an invitation from ISSF to send Dainis Upelnieks in the men's skeet to the Olympics, as long as the minimum qualifying score (MQS) was fulfilled by March 31, 2016.

Athlete	Event	Qualification		Semifinal		Final	
Athlete	Event	Points	Rank	Points	Rank	Points	Rank
Dainis Upelnieks	Men's skeet	119	14	Did not advance			

Qualification Legend: Q = Qualify for the next round; q = Qualify for the bronze medal (shotgun)

== Swimming ==
Latvia has received a Universality invitation from FINA to send two swimmers (one male and one female) to the Olympics.

Athlete	Event	Heat		Semifinal		Final	
Athlete	Event	Time	Rank	Time	Rank	Time	Rank
Uvis Kalniņš	Men's 200 m individual medley	2:02.34	24	Did not advance			
Aļona Ribakova	Women's 200 m breaststroke	2:30.82	27	Did not advance			

== Tennis ==
Latvia has entered one tennis player into the Olympic tournament. Jeļena Ostapenko (world no. 39) qualified directly for the women's singles, as one of the top 56 eligible players in the ATP and WTA World Rankings as of June 6, 2016.

Athlete	Event	Round of 64	Round of 32	Round of 16	Quarterfinals	Semifinals	Final / BM	
Athlete	Event	Opposition Score	Opposition Score	Opposition Score	Opposition Score	Opposition Score	Opposition Score	Rank
Jeļena Ostapenko	Women's singles	Stosur (AUS); L 6–1, 3–6, 2–6	Did not advance					

== Volleyball ==
=== Beach ===
Latvia men's beach volleyball team qualified directly for the Olympics by virtue of their nation's top 15 placement in the FIVB Olympic Rankings as of June 13, 2016. The place was awarded to the newly-formed duo of London 2012 bronze medalist Jānis Šmēdiņš and two-time Olympian Aleksandrs Samoilovs.

Athlete	Event	Preliminary round	Standing	Round of 16	Quarterfinals	Semifinals	Final / BM	
Athlete	Event	Opposition Score	Standing	Opposition Score	Opposition Score	Opposition Score	Opposition Score	Rank
Aleksandrs Samoilovs; Jānis Šmēdiņš	Men's	Pool D Saxton – Schalk (CAN); W 2 – 1 (21–17, 18–21, 15–13); Díaz – González (CUB); L 1 – 2 (21–23, 21–19. 9–15); Oliveira – Solberg (BRA); L 1 – 2 (16–21, 22–20, 7–15)	4	Did not advance				

== Weightlifting ==
Latvia has qualified one male weightlifter for the Olympics by virtue of his top 15 individual finish, among those who had not secured any quota places through the World or European Championships, in the IWF World Rankings as of June 20, 2016. The place was awarded to London 2012 Olympian Artūrs Plēsnieks in the men's heavyweight division (105 kg).

Meanwhile, an unused women's Olympic spot was added to the Latvian weightlifting team by IWF, as a response to the vacancy of women's quota places in the individual World Rankings and to the "multiple positive cases" of doping on several nations.

Athlete	Event	Snatch		Clean & Jerk		Total	Rank
Athlete	Event	Result	Rank	Result	Rank	Total	Rank
Artūrs Plēsnieks	Men's −105 kg	181	8	218	9	399	8
Rebeka Koha	Women's −53 kg	90	3	107	4	197	4

== Wrestling ==
Latvia has qualified one wrestler for the women's freestyle 63 kg into the Olympic competition, as a result of her top six finish at the 2015 World Championships.

Key:

- VT – Victory by Fall.
- PP – Decision by Points – the loser with technical points.
- PO – Decision by Points – the loser without technical points.
- ST – Technical superiority – the loser without technical points and a margin of victory of at least 8 (Greco-Roman) or 10 (freestyle) points.

Women's freestyle

Athlete	Event	Qualification	Round of 16	Quarterfinal	Semifinal	Repechage 1	Repechage 2	Final / BM	
Athlete	Event	Opposition Result	Opposition Result	Opposition Result	Opposition Result	Opposition Result	Opposition Result	Opposition Result	Rank
Anastasija Grigorjeva	−63 kg	Bye	Riabi (TUN); W 4–0 ^{ST}	Kawai (JPN); L 1–3 ^{PP}	Did not advance	Bye	Michalik (POL); L 1–3 ^{PP}	Did not advance	7

== See also ==
- Latvia at the 2016 Summer Paralympics
