= Agnis Čavars =

Latvian basketball player (born 1986)

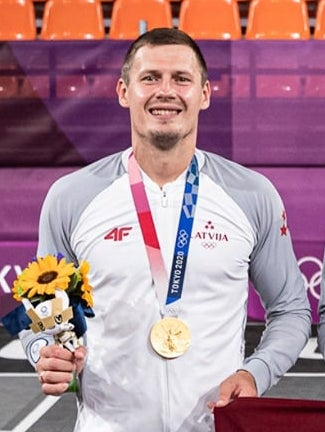
- Čavars in 2021

Personal information
- Born: 31 July 1986 (age 40) Ķekava, Latvian SSR, Soviet Union
- Listed height: 1.96 m (6 ft 5 in)
- Listed weight: 98 kg (216 lb)

Career highlights
- FIBA 3x3 World Tour winner (2020)
Medals
Men's 3x3 basketball
Representing Latvia
Olympic Games
Gold medal – first place	2020 Tokyo	Team
World Cup
Silver medal – second place	2019 Amsterdam	Team
Bronze medal – third place	2023 Vienna	Team
Europe Cup
Gold medal – first place	2017 Amsterdam
Silver medal – second place	2018 Bucharest
Silver medal – second place	2022 Graz

Agnis Čavars (born 31 July 1986) is a Latvian basketball player for the Latvian 3x3 national team.

He represented Latvia at the 2020 Summer Olympics and together with Jeļena Ostapenko was delegation's flag bearer at the opening ceremony. Čavars was part of the gold medal winning team that included Nauris Miezis, Kārlis Pauls Lasmanis, and Edgars Krūmiņš, and defeated the Russian Olympic Committee team 21:18 in the gold medal game.

== Career ==
=== Classic basketball ===
Before transitioning to 3x3 basketball, Čavars had a career in traditional 5-on-5 basketball, playing as a forward. He spent several seasons in the Latvian Basketball League (LBL), where he represented multiple teams, including ASK/Rīga, Ķeizarmežs, Barons/LMT, Valmiera Glass/VIA, and BK Jelgava. During his time with Barons/LMT, Čavars won the Latvian Basketball League championship in 2010. He also played professionally abroad in Germany and Sweden.

After moving to 3x3 basketball, Čavars continued playing traditional basketball, competing for BK Ķekava in Latvia's National Basketball League (formerly LBL2). Additionally, he represented Latvia at the U-18 and U-20 European Championships.

=== 3x3 Basketball ===
Čavars made his mark on the international stage in 3x3 basketball, representing Latvia at the 2020 Summer Olympics in Tokyo. This was the debut of 3x3 basketball at the Olympics. Čavars, along with teammates Nauris Miezis, Kārlis Pauls Lasmanis, and Edgars Krūmiņš, won the gold medal, defeating the Russian Olympic Committee team 21:18 in the final. This victory marked Latvia's first Olympic gold medal in nine years and was the first-ever Olympic gold in 3x3 basketball history.

Čavars was also one of Latvia's flag bearers at the Olympic opening ceremony, alongside tennis player Jeļena Ostapenko. Throughout the tournament, he contributed 28 points over ten games.

Olympic Games
Preceded by Māris Štrombergs	Flagbearer for Latvia (with Jeļena Ostapenko); Tokyo 2020	Succeeded by Tīna Graudiņa; Nauris Miezis
