= Emīlija Šmite =

Latvian chess player (1899–1977)

Personal information
- Born: 1899
- Died: September 16, 1977

Chess career
- Country: Latvia

Emīlija Šmite (1899 – 16 September 1977) was a Latvian chess player.

== Biography ==
Emīlija Šmite was permanent participant of first Latvian Women's Chess Championships in which she won several medals and has been very close to several times to win the title of Latvian Women's Chess Champion. In the 1938 Latvian Women's Chess Championship she shared 1st place with Elise Vogel and Marta Krūmiņa but after further competition remained in second place. After World War II Emīlija Šmite had rivalry with the leading Latvian chess players of this time Milda Lauberte. In the 1948 Latvian Women's Chess Championship she was a leader with 7 points out of 7, but in the decisive battle with Lauberte in first missed the won, then continued to play for victory and lost. The 1949 Latvian Women's Chess Championship she was also close to winning the whole tournament, but once again in the decisive party she lost Lauberte and stayed second. In December 1949 and January 1950, in Tallinn Emīlija Šmite participated in the 10th USSR Women's Chess Championship semi-final, in which shared 11th-12th place, but was the only one who win the tournament winner Kira Zvorykina. In the 1950s, Šmite's results in chess tournaments were no longer as good as before, but she played regularly until 1963 in the Latvian Women's Chess Championships.

In the 1960s Emīlija Šmite worked in the electrical engineering department of VEF manufactory. In 1960, she represented the "VEF" team in Latvian 1st Team Chess Championship.

Buried in Riga Raiņa Cemetery.

== Results in Latvian Women's Chess Championship ==
- 1937 — 3rd-4th place.
- 1938 — 2nd place.
- 1941 — 3rd-4th place.
- 1948 — 2nd-3rd place.
- 1949 — 2nd place.
- 1950 — 5th-6th place.
- 1951 — 3rd-4th place.
- 1953 — 8th place.
- 1954 — 4th place.
- 1955 — 5th-6th place.
- 1956 — 8th place.
- 1957 — 7th place.
- 1958 — 13th place.
- 1959 — 10th-11th place.
- 1960 — withdrawn after the 3rd round.
- 1961 — 12th place.
- 1963 — 10th-11th place.

== Literatura ==
- Encyclopedia of Latvian chessplayers : 1900-2000 / compiled by Val Zemitis; editors, J. Vitomskis ... [et al. ]. USA, 2009.
- Ģedimins Salmiņš, Valdemārs Zemītis "Sudraba važiņa no Stokholmas. Milda Lauberte šaha cīņās" ("Silver chain from Stockholm. Milda Lauberte in chess fighting"), Liepāja, LiePA, 2007, ISBN 9984-754-90-1.
- Zigfrīds Trenko "Latvijas pirmā šacha karaliene" ("Latvia's First Chess Queen"), Riga, author's edition, 2011, ISBN 978-9984-49-308-4.
