= Latvia men's national 3x3 team =

National 3x3 basketball team

Latvia
- FIBA ranking: 3
- FIBA zone: FIBA Europe
- National federation: LBS

Olympic Games
- Appearances: 2
- Medals: Gold: 2020

FIBA 3x3 World Cup
- Appearances: 7
- Medals: Gold: 2026; Silver: 2019; Bronze: 2023

European Games
- Appearances: 2
- Medals: Gold: 2023; Silver: 2019

Europe Cup
- Appearances: 8
- Medals: Gold: 2017, 2026; Silver: 2018, 2025; Bronze: 2023
Medal record
Men's 3x3 basketball
Representing Latvia
Olympic Games
Gold medal – first place	2020 Tokyo	Team
World Cup
Gold medal – first place	2026 Warsaw	Team
Silver medal – second place	2019 Amsterdam	Team
Bronze medal – third place	2023 Vienna	Team
Europe Cup
Gold medal – first place	2017 Amsterdam	Team
Gold medal – first place	2026 Antwerp	Team
Silver medal – second place	2018 Bucharest	Team
Silver medal – second place	2025 Copenhagen	Team
Bronze medal – third place	2023 Jerusalem	Team
European Games
Gold medal – first place	2023 Kraków	Team
Silver medal – second place	2019 Minsk	Team

The Latvia men's national 3x3 team (Latvian: Latvijas 3x3 basketbola izlase) is a national basketball team of Latvia, governed by the Latvian Basketball Association. It represents the country in international 3x3 (3 against 3) basketball competitions. The team won the first ever Olympic men's tournament in the 2020 Summer Olympics in Tokyo, beating the Russian Olympic Committee team in the gold medal final.

Other honors include the gold at the 2017 European Championships in Amsterdam, silver at the 2019 World Championship and the 2018 European Championship, as well as bronze medals at the 2021 Olympic Qualifying Tournament.

The first game of streetball in Latvia took place on 29 May 1993 upon the start of the Adidas Streetball tournament in the capital of Riga. The first Latvian championship was organized by the LBA in 2012 and the same year – the first national team.

== Competitions ==
=== Olympic Games ===
Year	Position	Pld	W	L	Players
(Japan) 2020 Tokyo	1st	10	7	3	Čavars, Krūmiņš, Lasmanis, Miezis
(France) 2024 Paris	4th	9	7	2	Miezis, Lasmanis, Lācis, Raimo
Total	2/2	19	14	5	

=== World Cup ===
Year	Position	Pld	W	L	Players
2012 Greece	18th	5	1	4	Jonāts, Kanbergs, Krūmiņš, Mizis
2014 Russia	did not qualify				
2016 China	did not qualify				
2017 France	did not qualify				
2018 Philippines	6th	5	4	1	Čavars, Krūmiņš, Lasmanis, Miezis
2019 Netherlands	2nd	7	4	3	Čavars, Krūmiņš, Lasmanis, Miezis
2022 Belgium	6th	6	4	2	Čavars, Lasmanis, Miezis, Strēlnieks
(Austria) 2023 Vienna	3rd	8	6	2	Lācis, Čavars, Lasmanis, Miezis
(Mongolia) 2025 Ulaanbaatar	7th	6	4	2	Gludītis, Lasmanis, Miezis, Raimo
(Poland) 2026 Warsaw	1st	8	7	1	Lācis, Lasmanis, Miezis, Raimo
2027 Singapore	to be determined				
Total	6/11	45	30	15	

=== Europe Cup ===
Year	Position	Pld	W	L	Players
2014 Romania	did not qualify				
2016 Romania	did not qualify				
2017 Netherlands	1st	5	4	1	Čavars, Krūmiņš, Lasmanis, Miezis
2018 Romania	2nd	5	4	1	Čavars, Krūmiņš, Lasmanis, Miezis
2019 Hungary	10th	2	0	2	Čavars, Krūmiņš, Lasmanis, Miezis
2021 France	did not qualify				
2023 Israel	3rd	5	4	1	Lācis, Lasmanis, Osis, Raimo
2024 Austria	Group stage	2	0	2	Lācis, Gluditis, Raimo, Apsītis
2025 Denmark	2nd	5	3	2	Kuksiks, Lācis, Miezis, Raimo
(Belgium) 2026 Antwerp	1st	5	5	0	Gluditis, Kuksiks, Miezis, Raimo
Total	8/11	29	20	9	

== Roster ==
The roster for the 2026 FIBA 3x3 World Cup:

Latvia men's national 3x3 team – 2020 Summer Olympics roster
Players
Coaches

Pos.	No.	Name	Age – Date of birth	Height	Club	Ctr.
G	1	Nauris Miezis	35 – March 31, 1991	1.90 m (6 ft 3 in)	No club
C	2	Kārlis Lasmanis	32 – April 8, 1994	2.00 m (6 ft 7 in)	No club
F	6	Francis Lācis	27 – February 22, 1999	2.00 m (6 ft 7 in)	No club
F	9	Zigmārs Raimo	28 – November 14, 1997	2.00 m (6 ft 7 in)	No club

Head coach

- (Latvia) Raimonds Feldmanis

Legend

- Club – describes last
  club before the tournament
- Age – describes age
  on 2 June 2026

== See also ==
- Latvia men's national basketball team
