= Hugo Teodors Krūmiņš =

Latvian playwright and poet

- Born: January 5, 1901; Vitrupes, Kreis Wolmar, Russian Empire (now Latvia)
- Died: April 16, 1990 (aged 89); New York City, United States
- Education: University of Latvia
- Occupations: Playwright, poet
- Spouse: Marta Krūmiņa-Vitrupe

Hugo Teodors Krūmiņš (1901-1990) was a Latvian playwright and poet. A member of the Latvian Artists' Association, he was married to poet and Latvian chess master Marta Krūmiņa-Vitrupe.

== Biography ==
He was born to a large family. After completing his secondary education at Limbaži gymnasium, he went on to study between 1920 and 1926 at the faculty of medicine of the University of Latvia. He subsequently became a school teacher in Tukums, although he ended up returning to his native Vitrupes. When the Second World War broke out, he and his wife moved to Germany, where he worked as a school manager and where they spent five years. In 1950, they moved to the United States, first to Cleveland, and later on to New York.

== Works ==
From 1920 he published in numerous periodicals. Works include "Jaunais agronoms" (1927), "Vecpuiši", "Atstātā līgava", "Ideāla vecmāte" (1928), "Priekšzīmīga saimniecība" (1929), "Sāncenši" (1930), "Modernais lauksaimnieks", "Vecpuiši precas" (1931), "Melanholiskais valsis" (1931), "Toms Dižboms" (1932), "Eksportsviests un mīlestība"(1932); "Silzemnieki" (1934), "Druvu dziesma" (1939),"Zemnieka testaments" (1939), "Jūrnieka kristība" (1946), "Cēli kā dzimtenes dievnami" (1949), "Vārds dzejniekiem no tautas" (1963), "Maestro no Rucavas" (1964).
