= Rūta Lasmane =

Latvian athlete

Rūta Kate Lasmane
Personal information
- Nationality: Latvian
- Born: 17 December 2000 (age 25)

Sport
- Sport: Athletics
- Event(s): Long jump Triple jump

Achievements and titles
- Personal best(s): Long Jump: 6.42m (Lubbock, 2022); Triple Jump: 14.47m (Boston, 2024)
Medal record
Women's athletics
Representing Latvia
European Athletics U23 Championships
Bronze medal – third place	2021 Tallinn	Triple jump
European Athletics U20 Championships
Bronze medal – third place	2019 Borås	Triple jump

Rūta Kate Lasmane (born 17 December 2000) is a Latvian track and field athlete. She is a multiple time Latvian national champion in the triple jump and long jump. She won the triple jump at the 2024 NCAA Indoor Championships and competed at the 2024 Olympic Games.

== Early life ==
Born and raised in Ventspils, Latvia, she began jumping at twelve years-old. She began at Florida State University in September 2020 to study psychology, where she competed for the Florida State Seminoles track and field team. She later transferred to the Texas Tech Red Raiders track and field team.

== Career ==
She was a bronze medalist in the triple jump at the European U20 Athletics Championships in Boras in 2019. She was a bronze medalist in the triple jump at the European U23 Athletics Championships in Tallinn in 2021.

She won a bronze medal in the triple jump competition of the 2021 NCAA Division I Indoor Athletics Championships, breaking the Latvian indoor record held by Gundega Sproģi from 1999, with a jump of 14.15 metres.

Lasmane made her senior international debut at the 2022 European Athletics Championships in Munich, Germany, in the triple jump, but did not reach the final.

In May 2023, she finished second in the triple jump in division two of the 2023 European Athletics Team Championships competition in Chorzów, Poland.

She won the NCAA Indoor Championships in March 2024 in Boston, Massachusetts with a personal best distance of 14.47 metres. She competed in the triple jump at the 2024 Olympic Games in Paris, France, where she jumped 13.76 metres but did not qualify for the final.

She suffered a ruptured Achilles tendon in 2025 which required surgery, and prevented her from attempting to retain her NCAA Indoor title in March 2025.

Lasmane qualified for the 2026 NCAA Division I Indoor Track and Field Championships, placing fourth in the triple jump. In March, she placed twelfth at the 2026 World Athletics Indoor Championships in Toruń, Poland.

== Personal life ==
Her father is Olympic rower Uģis Lasmanis and her brother is Latvian Olympic basketball player Kārlis Lasmanis.
