= Marta Krūmiņa-Vitrupe =

Latvian writer and chess master (1908–2010)

- Born: 29 March 1908; Vitrupe (now Limbaži Municipality), Kreis Wolmar, Governorate of Livonia
- Died: 6 February 2010 (aged 101); New York City, US

Marta Krūmiņa-Vitrupe (born Marta Legzdiņa; March 29, 1908 – February 6, 2010) was a Latvian poet, writer and chess master who won the Latvian Chess Championship for women in 1941.

== Biography ==
Marta Krūmiņa-Vitrupe was born into a peasant family, which has grown four daughters and a son. She studied at the school in Limbaži, then in Riga was engaged in playing the piano. Married with playwright and poet Hugo Teodors Krūmiņš (1901–1990), who was a member of the Latvian community of writers "Green Crow". In their home in the summer often visited well-known creative people: Eriks Adamsons, Aleksandrs Čaks, Jānis Grots, Aleksandrs Grīns, Jānis Sudrabkalns, Mārtiņš Zīverts. During World War II Marta Krumina-Vitrupe together with her husband left Latvia. The early years of exile they conducted first in Germany, and in 1950 the family moved to United States in Cleveland. There Marta Krūmiņa-Vitrupe worked in city hospital, and the last years of her life she spent in the New York City. Marta Krūmiņa-Vitrupe had two children, four grandchildren and six great-grandchildren.

== Chess career ==
Marta Krūmiņa-Vitrupe was a member of the Sports Association of Valmiera. In 1938, she won the women's chess championship of Vidzeme and participated in the Latvian Chess Championship for women, where she shared the first – third place with Elise Vogel and Emīlija Šmite, but after further competition remained in third place. In 1941 Marta Krūmiņa-Vitrupe won all parties in Latvian Chess Championship for women. Such a record 100.0 percent result in the Latvian Chess Championship for women only repeated Dana Reizniece in 1999.

== Literary work ==
Marta Krūmiņa-Vitrupe left creative heritage – poetry and essays. In her work mainly affected by the topics relevant to her time. In the poem "In Memory of chess master Apšenieks" gives the image of the famous chess player of Latvia, which won the Alekhine, and Euwe, but powerless to struggle with his death.

== Bibliography ==
- Marta Vitrupe "Dziesma smilgai", Rīga, "Jumava", 2005, ISBN 9984-05-837-9 / Marta Vitrupe "Song for grass", Riga, 2005
