= Ivita Krūmiņa =

Latvian ice hockey player (born 1981)

- Born: 19 September 1981 (age 45)
- Height: 160 cm (5 ft 3 in)
- Weight: 50 kg (110 lb; 7 st 12 lb)
- Position: Forward
- Shoots: Left
- OBWIC team: SHK Laima Rīga
- National team: Latvia
- Playing career: 2006–present

Ivita Krūmiņa (born 19 September 1981) is a Latvian ice hockey player, currently playing with the Latvian national team and SHK Laima Rīga of the Optibet Baltic Women's Ice-hockey Championship (OBWIC).
