= Kristaps Neretnieks =

Latvian equestrian (born 1989)

Personal information
- Nationality: Latvian
- Born: 2 August 1989 (age 36) Riga, Latvian SSR, Soviet Union

Sport
- Sport: Equestrian
- Event: Show jumping

Kristaps Neretnieks (born 2 August 1989) is a Latvian show jumper. He represented Latvia at the 2020 Summer Olympics in Tokyo 2021, finishing 23rd in individual jumping.
