= Zigmārs Raimo =

Latvian basketball player

Personal information
- Born: 14 November 1997 (age 29) Madona, Latvia
- Listed height: 2.00 m (6 ft 7 in)

Career information
- College: University of Hawaii, Manoa
Medals
Men's 3x3 basketball
Representing Latvia
World Cup
Gold medal – first place	2026 Warsaw	Team
European Games
Gold medal – first place	2023 Kraków–Małopolska	Team
Europe Cup
Gold medal – first place	2026 Antwerp	Team
Silver medal – second place	2025 Copenhagen	Team
Bronze medal – third place	2023 Jerusalem

Zigmārs Raimo (born 14 November 1997) is a Latvian basketball player who plays as a power forward. He currently represents Rīgas Zeļļi in the Latvian Basketball League (LBL) and also competes in 3x3 basketball. He represented Latvia at the 2024 Summer Olympics in 3x3 event.
