= Francis Lācis =

Latvian basketball player

No. 22 – Rīgas Zeļļi
- League: Latvian–Estonian Basketball League; Latvijas Basketbola līga

Personal information
- Born: 22 February 1999 (age 27) Riga, Latvia
- Listed height: 2.00 m (6 ft 7 in)

Career information
- High school: Riga Centre Language School
- College: Oral Roberts University

Career history
- 2018-2022: Oral Roberts Golden Eagles
- 2023-present: Rīgas Zeļļi
Medals
Representing Latvia
Men's 3x3 basketball
World Cup
Gold medal – first place	2026 Warsaw	Team
Bronze medal – third place	2023 Vienna	Team
European Games
Gold medal – first place	2023 Kraków–Małopolska	Team
Europe Cup
Silver medal – second place	2025 Copenhagen	Team
Bronze medal – third place	2023 Jerusalem

Francis Gustavs Lācis (born 22 February 1999) is a Latvian basketball player for the Rīgas Zeļļi of the Latvian–Estonian Basketball League and Latvijas Basketbola līga. He represented Latvia at the 2024 Summer Olympics in 3x3 event.
