= Jeļena Ostapenko =

Latvian tennis player (born 1997)

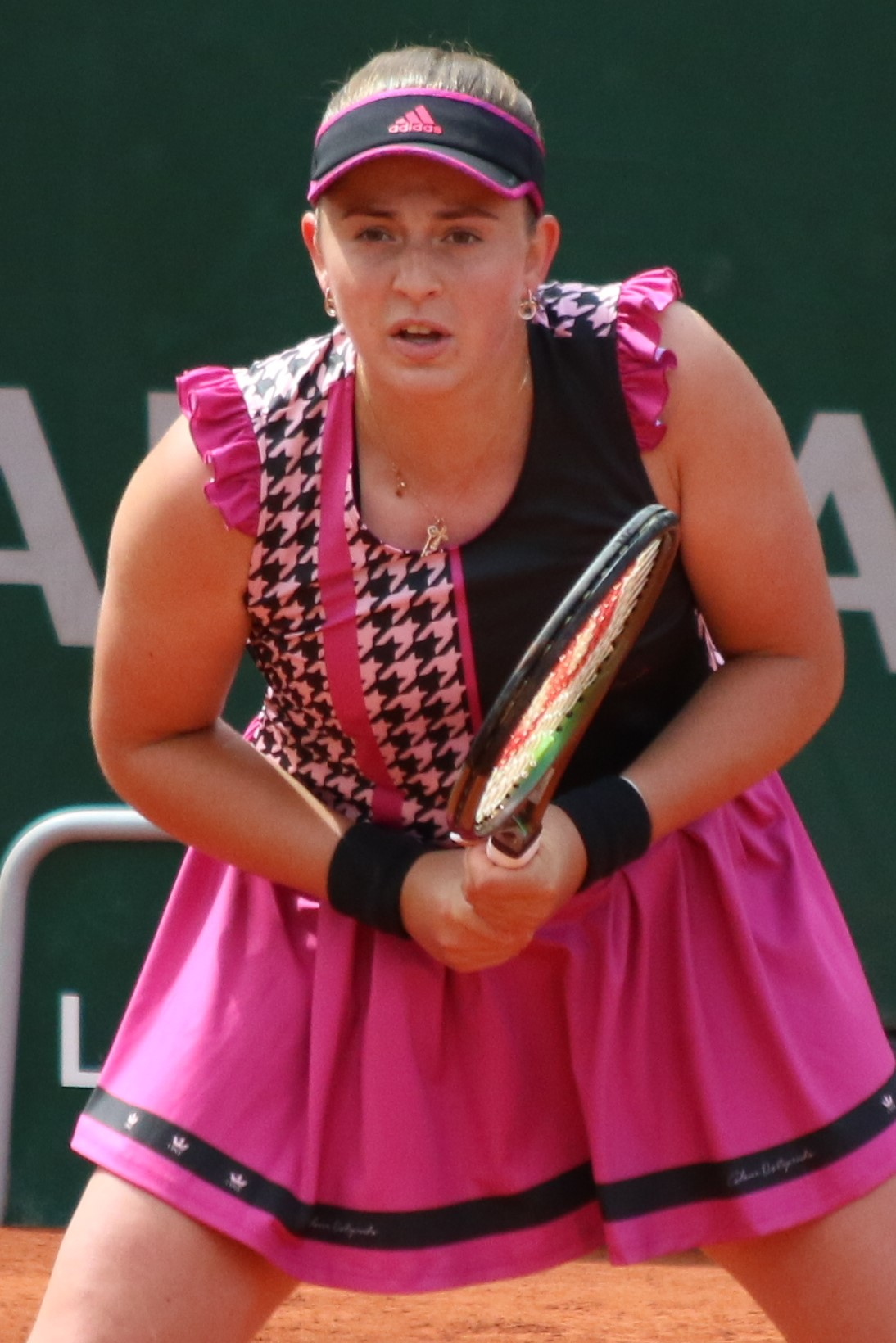
- Ostapenko at the 2022 French Open
- Native name: Jeļena Ostapenko
- Country (sports): Latvia
- Residence: Riga, Latvia
- Born: 8 June 1997 (age 29) Riga, Latvia
- Height: 1.77 m (5 ft 10 in)
- Turned pro: 2012
- Plays: Right-handed (two-handed backhand)
- Coach: Piotr Sierzputowski
- Prize money: US$ 21,021,098: 29th all-time in earnings

Singles
- Career record: 396–253
- Career titles: 9
- Highest ranking: No. 5 (19 March 2018)
- Current ranking: No. 31 (3 July 2026)

Grand Slam singles results
- Australian Open: QF (2023)
- French Open: W (2017)
- Wimbledon: SF (2018)
- US Open: QF (2023)

Other tournaments
- Tour Finals: RR (2017)
- Olympic Games: 1R (2016, 2021, 2024)

Doubles
- Career record: 287–174
- Career titles: 12
- Highest ranking: No. 3 (14 July 2025)
- Current ranking: No. 13 (23 February 2026)

Grand Slam doubles results
- Australian Open: F (2024, 2025)
- French Open: SF (2022)
- Wimbledon: F (2025)
- US Open: W (2024)

Other doubles tournaments
- Tour Finals: SF (2022, 2025)
- Olympic Games: 1R (2021)

Mixed doubles
- Career record: 17–11
- Career titles: 1

Grand Slam mixed doubles results
- Australian Open: QF (2023)
- French Open: 1R (2017, 2018, 2023)
- Wimbledon: W (2026)
- US Open: QF (2022)

Team competitions
- Fed Cup: 37–21
- Last updated on: 23 February 2026.

Jeļena "Aļona" Ostapenko (born 8 June 1997) is a Latvian professional tennis player. She has a career-high singles ranking of world No. 5 in singles by the WTA, achieved in March 2018, and No. 3 in doubles, attained in July 2025. Ostapenko has won nine WTA Tour–level singles titles, including a major at the 2017 French Open, and 13 doubles titles, including two majors at the 2024 US Open in women's doubles with Lyudmyla Kichenok and at the 2026 Wimbledon Championships in mixed doubles with Marcelo Arévalo. She is the current No. 1 player from Latvia.

Ostapenko has also won 15 singles titles and 15 doubles titles on the ITF Women's Circuit, and the junior singles event at the 2014 Wimbledon Championships. She is a member of the Latvia Billie Jean King Cup team.

== Personal life ==
Ostapenko was born on 8 June 1997 in Riga, Latvia to former Ukrainian footballer, Jevgēnijs Ostapenko (d. 2020) and Latvian-Russian tennis coach and former player, Jeļena Jakovļeva. Jevgēnijs played professional football for Metalurh Zaporizhzhia in the southeastern Ukrainian city of Zaporizhzhia, where Jeļena's grandmother lives. Jeļena has one half-brother, Maksim, who lives in the United States.

Ostapenko was introduced to tennis at age five by her mother and idolised Serena Williams while growing up. She also started dancing at that age, going on to compete in the national ballroom dance championships of Latvia. At the age of 12, she chose to focus on tennis, but she credits her good coordination and skilled footwork to the years she danced competitively. Ostapenko speaks Latvian, Russian, and English.

Her legal name is Jeļena, but she is known to her family and friends as Aļona. When she was born, her parents' desired name of Aļona was not on the Latvian name calendar, so she was named Jeļena after her mother. Latvian authorities, however, have claimed that there were no restrictions in place at that time to register any name, and that there had been some misunderstanding. Fans in Latvia and elsewhere had always called her Aļona, but the name was unknown in the West until her win at Roland Garros in 2017. She uses her legal name professionally in order to avoid administrative confusion.

== Career ==
=== 2014: Wimbledon junior champion, WTA Tour debut ===
Ostapenko won the singles event at the junior Wimbledon Championships and was ranked the No. 2 junior tennis player in the world in September 2014. She made her WTA Tour main-draw debut at the Tashkent Open, having been awarded a wildcard and recorded her first win.

=== 2015: Major debut ===
At the Ladies Neva Cup, Ostapenko went through qualifying and won the biggest title thus far. At Wimbledon, Ostapenko defeated the ninth-seeded Carla Suárez Navarro in straight sets (dropping only two games in the match and grabbing her first win over a top-ten player) in the first round, before losing to Kristina Mladenovic.

At the US Open, she lost her second-round match to Sara Errani. In September, she reached her first WTA Tour final at the Canadian Open, where she lost to Annika Beck. She ended the season as the world No. 79.

=== 2016: Qatar final, Wimbledon mixed semifinal ===
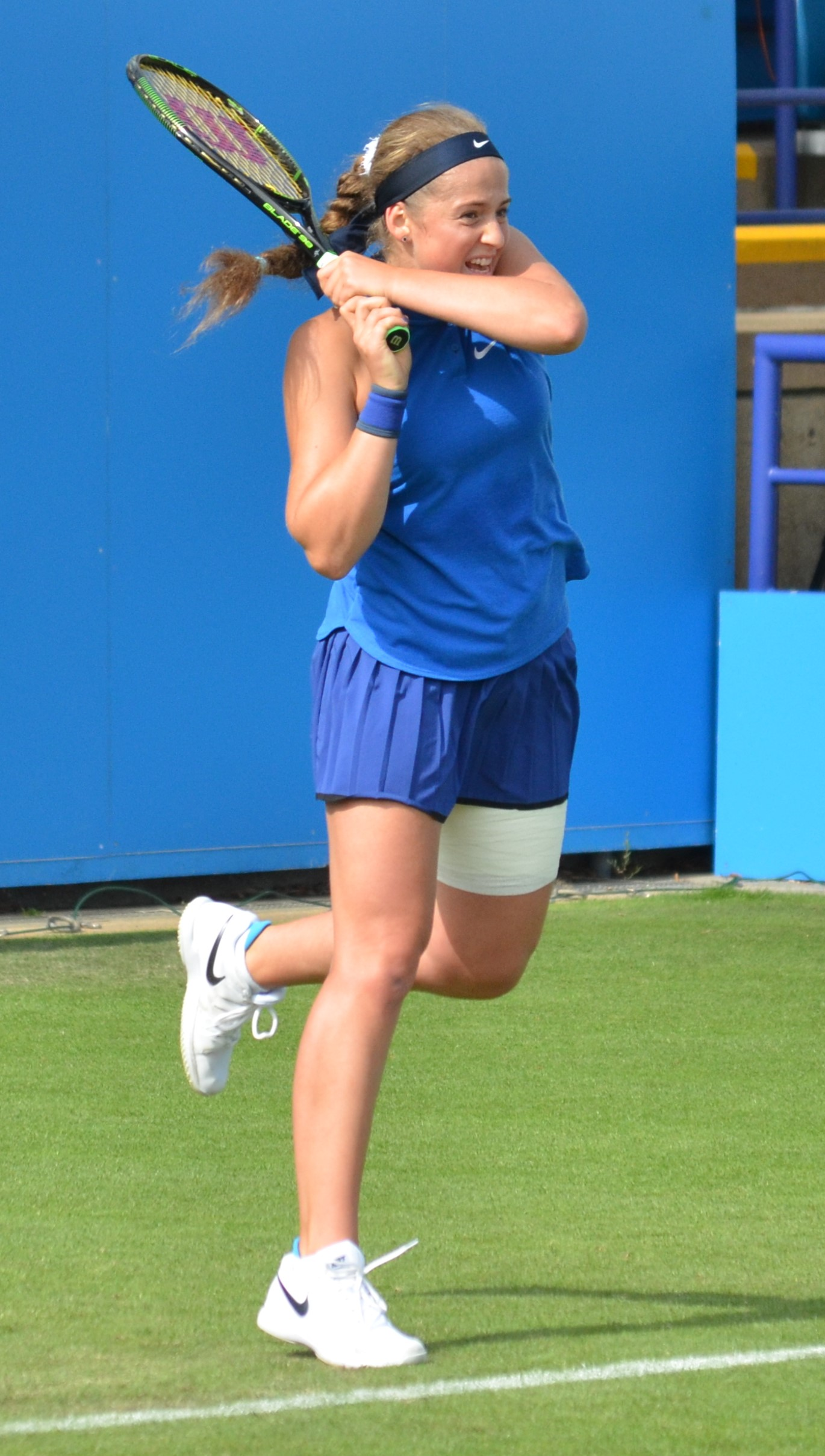
Ostapenko at the 2016 Eastbourne International

Ostapenko reached the final of the Premier 5 Qatar Ladies Open in Doha, beating world No. 8, Petra Kvitová, on the way. She was beaten by Carla Suárez Navarro in the final, nevertheless she rose to No. 41 in the world rankings.

At the French Open, Ostapenko was seeded in the singles at a Grand Slam tournament for the first time in her career, but she dropped her opening match to Naomi Osaka. At the Birmingham Classic, she beat Anastasia Pavlyuchenkova in straight sets in the first round, and two-time Wimbledon champion Petra Kvitová in the second before she was defeated by Madison Keys in the quarterfinals. Ostapenko made the semifinals in mixed doubles at Wimbledon with Oliver Marach, before they fell to the eventual champions, Heather Watson and Henri Kontinen.

Ostapenko made her Olympic debut at the 2016 Rio Summer Olympics but lost to Samantha Stosur in the first round. She ended the season ranked No. 44 in the world.

=== 2017: French Open champion, top 10 in singles ===
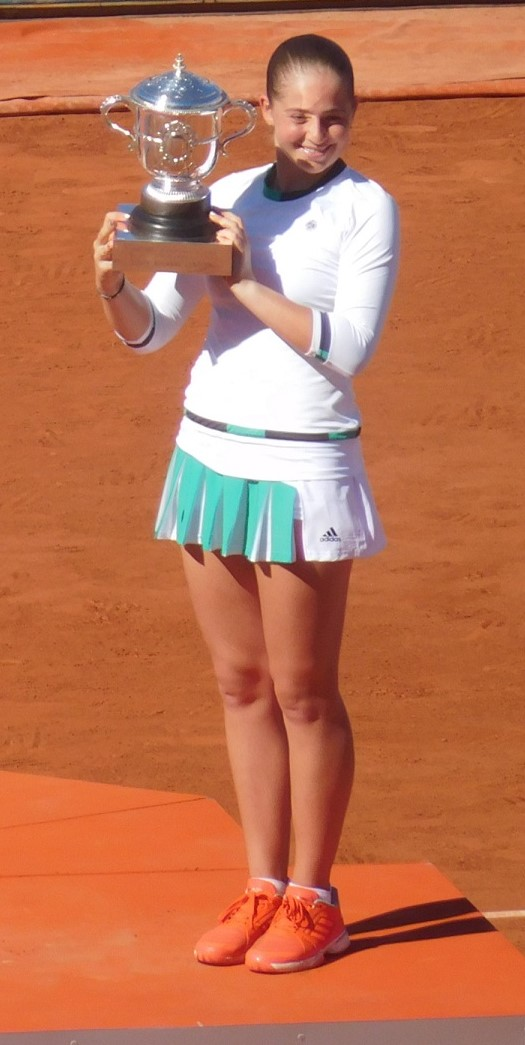
Ostapenko with her 2017 French Open title

At the Australian Open, she advanced to the third round of a major tournament for the first time, losing to Karolína Plíšková in three sets despite serving for the match in the third set.

At the Charleston Open, she reached the final losing to fellow 19-year-old Daria Kasatkina.

At the French Open, Ostapenko, then ranked 47th in the world, defeated Louisa Chirico, Monica Puig, Lesia Tsurenko, and Samantha Stosur. She then faced Caroline Wozniacki in the quarterfinals. Ostapenko came from a set down to defeat her, reaching her first Grand Slam semifinal. She was the first Latvian female player to do so and first teenager in a decade to reach the French Open semifinals (the last was Ana Ivanovic in 2007), opposite Timea Bacsinszky on 8 June, the birthday of both players. She beat Bacsinszky in three sets to reach the final, being the first unseeded female player to play in the final of the French Open since Mima Jaušovec in 1983 and the first Latvian player to reach the final of a major. In the final against third-seeded Simona Halep, Ostapenko came back from being down a set and 3–0 to win her first professional title. She became the first Latvian player to win a Grand Slam singles tournament and the first unseeded woman to win the French Open since 1933. Ostapenko also became the first player since Gustavo Kuerten to win his or her first career title at a Grand Slam tournament; coincidentally Kuerten won his first title at the 1997 French Open on the day Ostapenko was born. With the win, she reached a new career-high ranking of world No. 12.

At Wimbledon, Ostapenko beat Aliaksandra Sasnovich, Françoise Abanda, Camila Giorgi, and fourth-seeded Elina Svitolina en-route to her second Grand Slam quarterfinal. She lost to five-time champion Venus Williams.

Then, at the US Open, she reached the third round by defeating Lara Arruabarrena and Sorana Cîrstea, before losing to Daria Kasatkina. Her performance was enough for her to make her top-ten debut in the world rankings, at No. 10.

At the end of September, she won her second career title at the Korea Open in Seoul. In the Wuhan Open, she beat Barbora Strýcová and Monica Puig to reach the quarterfinals, where she scored her first win over a reigning WTA number one, Garbiñe Muguruza, extending her winning streak to eight in a row. She lost to Ashleigh Barty in the semifinal.

In October, she reached the semifinals of the China Open, losing to Simona Halep. At the WTA Finals, she scored a win over Karolína Plíšková but lost to Muguruza and Venus Williams. She ended the season ranked No. 7 in the world.

=== 2018: World No. 5 in singles, Major semifinal ===
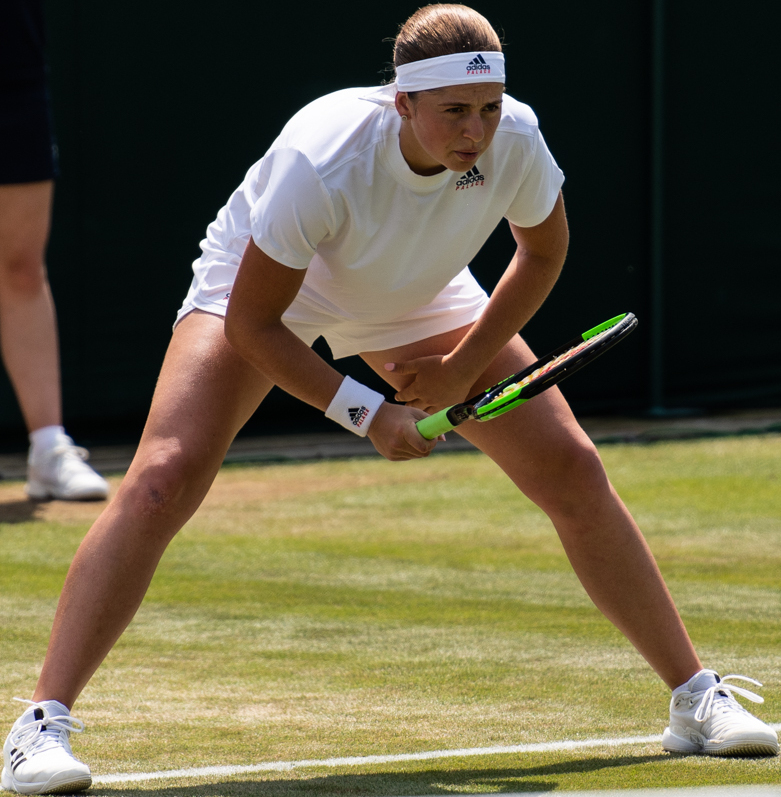
Ostapenko at the 2018 Wimbledon Championships

At Indian Wells, Ostapenko beat Belinda Bencic in the second round before losing to Petra Martić. As a result, she was ranked in the top 5.

Playing at the Miami Open, she defeated ninth-seeded Petra Kvitová in the fourth round and fourth seed Elina Svitolina in the quarterfinals. In her semifinal match, Ostapenko defeated qualifier Danielle Collins to reach the final, in which she lost to No. 12 seed Sloane Stephens.

Ostapenko entered the French Open as the fifth seed, but failed to defend her title, losing in the first round to Kateryna Kozlova. Following the loss, she left the top ten for the first time since entering. At Wimbledon she beat Katy Dunne, Kirsten Flipkens, Vitalia Diatchenko and Aliaksandra Sasnovich to reach the quarterfinals for a second successive year, then beat Dominika Cibulková to reach her first Wimbledon semifinal, which she lost to eventual winner Angelique Kerber. A left wrist injury caused her to withdraw from the WTA Elite Trophy, and she ended the season ranked No. 22.

=== 2019: Doubles success ===
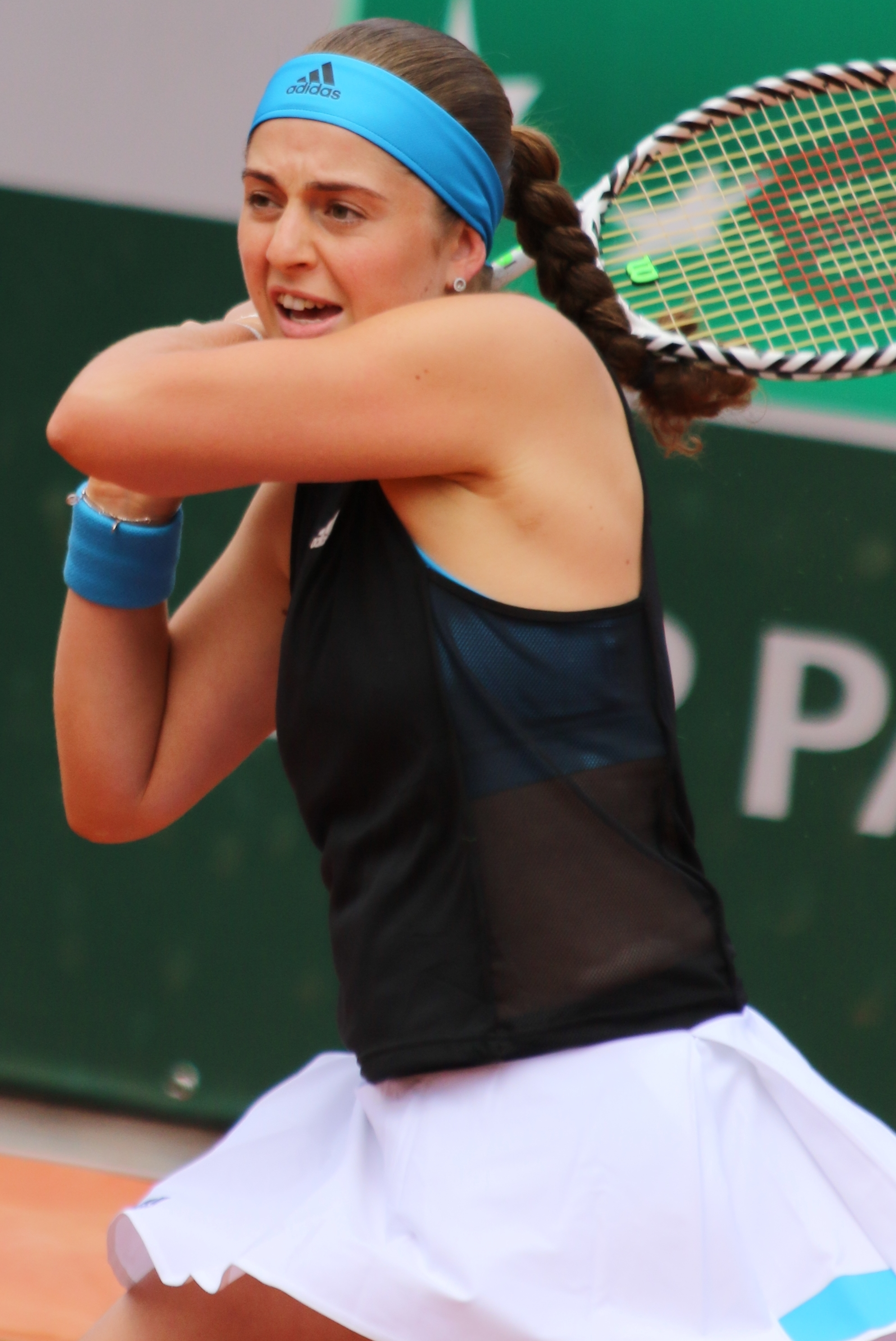
Ostapenko at the 2019 French Open

Ostapenko's first tournament of the year was the Shenzhen Open where she lost in the first round to Monica Niculescu. She went on to play at the Sydney International, where she lost to Ash Barty in the first round. At the Australian Open, Ostapenko was seeded 22nd and lost to Maria Sakkari, again in the first round. One commentator identified her tendency to hit a relatively high number of double faults, and frequent coaching changes, as contributing to her lack of success in 2019. At the French Open, she lost to Victoria Azarenka in the first round, but reached the quarterfinals of the doubles event with Lyudmyla Kichenok, falling to Elise Mertens and Aryna Sabalenka.

Ostapenko also lost in the first round of the Wimbledon Championships to Hsieh Su-wei. Despite the loss, alongside Robert Lindstedt she reached the first mixed-doubles final of her career, though they lost in straight sets to Latisha Chan and Ivan Dodig. During the tournament Ostapenko twice served a ball on the head of her partner Lindstedt. After Wimbledon, Ostapenko's ranking dropped to as low as No. 83 in the world; this was her lowest ranking since February 2016.

At Jūrmala, Ostapenko was defeated in the first round by Bernarda Pera, but she reached the final of the doubles alongside Galina Voskoboeva; the pair lost to Sharon Fichman and Nina Stojanović. At Toronto, Ostapeonko defeated Caroline Garcia and Anastasia Pavlyuchenkova to reach the third round, before losing to qualifier Marie Bouzková; in doubles, she and partner Lyudmyla Kichenok lost in the first round to Julia Görges and Karolína Plíšková. At Cincinnati, she was defeated in the first round of the singles tournament by Yulia Putintseva, and, partnering with Kichenok once again in the doubles, defeated Raquel Atawo and Han Xinyun in the first round, before falling to Lucie Hradecká and Andreja Klepač, the eventual champions. Finally, she had some success at the US Open where she beat Aleksandra Krunić and 2019 Wimbledon quarterfinalist Alison Riske, in straight sets, to reach her first Grand Slam third round of the season, where she faced wildcard entrant Kristie Ahn to whom she lost in straight sets. In doubles, she and Kichenok were defeated in the first round by Caroline Dolehide and Vania King.

At Zhengzhou, she defeated You Xiaodi in the first round, before falling to Aryna Sabalenka. At Seoul, she lost to Tímea Babos in the first round, and also lost in the first round of the doubles tournament where, partnering with Kirsten Flipkens, she fell to Hayley Carter and Luisa Stefani. At Tashkent, she retired in the first round against Katarina Zavatska. At Beijing, she upset the second seed Plíšková in the first round, before falling to Kateřina Siniaková in the second. However, she went on to reach the biggest women's doubles final of her career at Beijing, partnering with Dayana Yastremska; they lost to Sofia Kenin and Bethanie Mattek-Sands. At Linz, Ostapenko defeated Tamara Korpatsch, Alizé Cornet, and Elena Rybakina en route to reach her first semifinal appearance since 2018 Wimbledon. In the semifinal, she came from a set and a break deficit to defeat Ekaterina Alexandrova in three sets. In her first final since 2018 Miami, Ostapenko faced 15 year old lucky loser Coco Gauff, losing in three sets. At Linz, Ostapenko announced that she had added fellow Grand Slam champion Marion Bartoli to her coaching team.

At Luxembourg, Ostapenko defeated Caty McNally in the first round, and then defeated top-seeded Elise Mertens in the second round. She then defeated Antonia Lottner and Anna Blinkova to reach the final, where she defeated defending champion Julia Görges in straight sets, to win her first title since Seoul in 2017. By reaching two consecutive finals, Ostapenko managed to raise her ranking to No. 44, ending the year ranked No. 45 in the world.

=== 2020–2021: Eastbourne title, Olympic Games ===
Ostapenko withdrew from the 2020 Auckland Open following the sudden death of her father on January 3 at the age of 43. At the Australian Open, she defeated Liudmila Samsonova in the first round, before falling to Belinda Bencic in the second round. In doubles, she partnered with Gabriela Dabrowski and reached the quarterfinals, and in mixed doubles, she partnered with Leander Paes and lost in the second round to finalists Mattek-Sands and Jamie Murray.

After participating in the 2020–21 Billie Jean King Cup, where she lost to Serena Williams, but defeated Sofia Kenin before losing in the deciding doubles rubber to Kenin and Mattek-Sands, Ostapenko played at St. Petersburg, where she lost to Alizé Cornet in the first round, while struggling with illness and jet lag.

Upon the resumption of the WTA Tour following the COVID-19 pandemic, she withdrew from all North American events. Her first match was at Rome, where she lost in the first round in straight sets to Magda Linette. At Strasbourg, she reached her first quarterfinal of the year, defeating Lauren Davis and Kiki Bertens, before losing to Nao Hibino in two tiebreak sets. She progressed past the first round of the French Open for the first time since 2017, defeating Madison Brengle and Karolína Plíšková, before falling to Paula Badosa. At Ostrava, in receipt of a wildcard, she defeated Petra Martić before losing to Ons Jabeur. Due to the freezing of the WTA rankings, she ended the year No. 44 in the world for the second consecutive year.

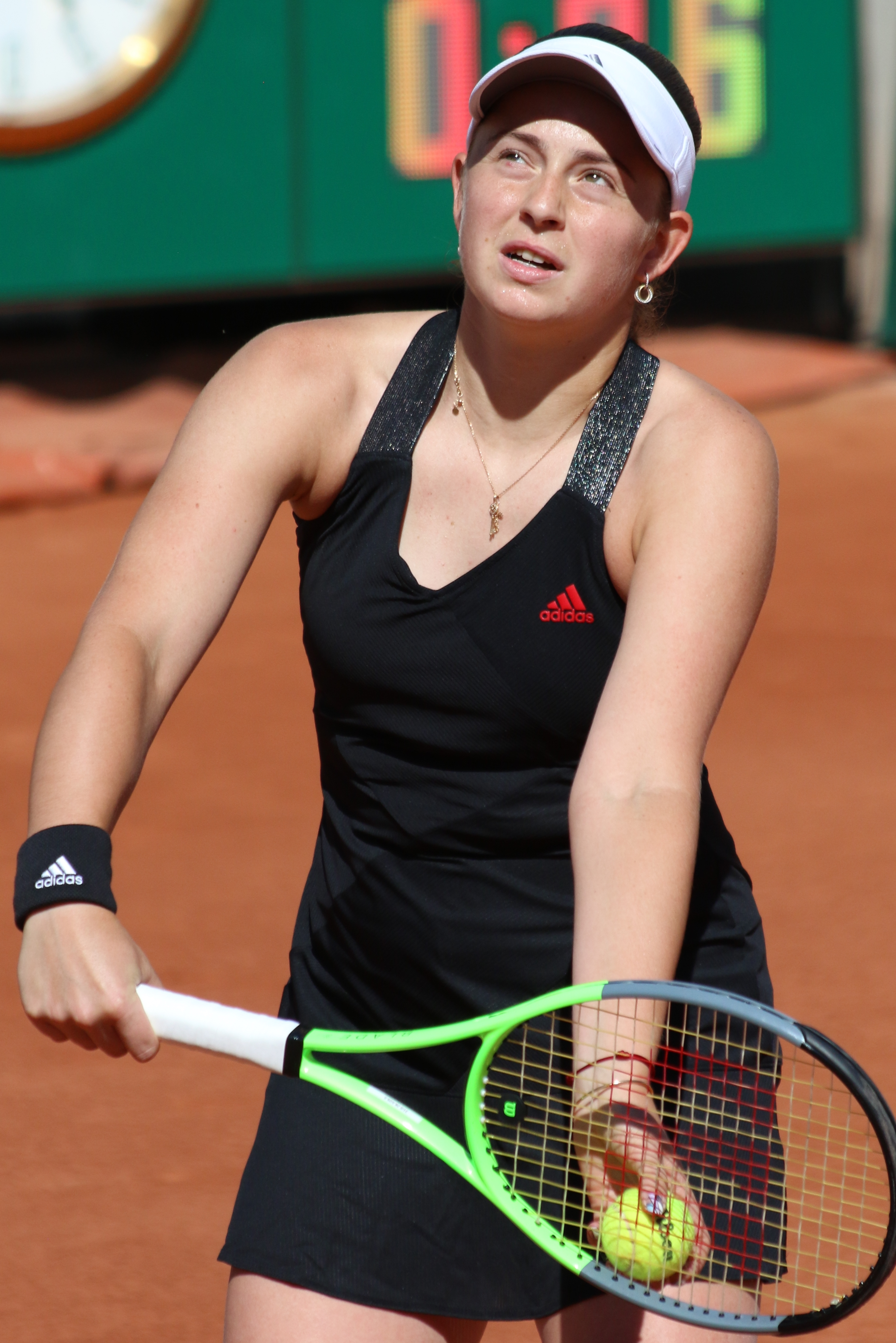
Ostapenko at the 2021 French Open

In May 2021, Ostapenko reached the semifinals in doubles at the Madrid Open with Anastasia Pavlyuchenkova defeating en route the top seeded pair and world No. 1 and No. 3, Hsieh Su-wei and Elise Mertens. Next she reached the quarterfinals of a WTA 1000 tournament at the Italian Open, her first since 2018, by defeating Angelique Kerber. She had match points against Karolína Plíšková, but lost in a third set tiebreak. At the French Open, Ostapenko lost in three sets to fourth seed Sofia Kenin in the first round.

As a wildcard entrant at the Eastbourne International, Ostapenko won her fourth title, defeating Anett Kontaveit in straight sets in the final. She became only the third wildcard entrant to win the title, following Monica Seles in 1996 and Julie Halard-Decugis in 2000. At Wimbledon, she reached the third round by defeating 31st seed Daria Kasatkina, but lost to Ajla Tomljanović in three sets.

At the 2020 Summer Olympics, Ostapenko was a flagbearer for Latvia alongside basketball player Agnis Čavars and entered the singles and doubles tournaments. She was defeated in the first round of the singles tournament by Elena Vesnina, in three sets. In doubles, Ostapenko partnered with Anastasija Sevastova and lost in the first round to Australia's Sam Stosur and Ellen Perez.

At the start of the US Open Series, Ostapenko competed at the Canadian Open as an unseeded player and lost in straight sets to the also unseeded Kateřina Siniaková. At the Cincinnati Open, also unseeded, she defeated Tamara Zidanšek in the first round and 13th seed Jennifer Brady (by retirement) in the second before losing to Angelique Kerber in the third. In late August, Ostapenko withdrew from the US Open for medical reasons. In September, she reached the final of the Luxembourg Open, losing to Clara Tauson in three sets. She ended the year winning the doubles title alongside Siniaková at the Kremlin Cup in Moscow.

=== 2022: Major semifinals and top 10 in doubles ===
Ostapenko reached the third round at the Australian Open, falling to Barbora Krejčíková after winning the first set. At the Dubai Championships, she defeated four Grand Slam champions — Sofia Kenin, Iga Świątek, Petra Kvitová, and Simona Halep — en route to the final. In the championship match, she defeated Veronika Kudermetova in straight sets. This was her fifth title, sixth final at WTA 500 level or above, and third final in the past nine months, after a title run in Eastbourne and a runner-up showing in Luxembourg the previous year. She returned to the top 15 at world No. 13 in the WTA singles rankings. She and Lyudmyla Kichenok reached the final of the same competition in doubles, but Kudermetova and Mertens prevailed.

At the Qatar Ladies Open, Ostapenko lost in the semifinals to Anett Kontaveit. She then lost in the first round of her next four tournaments (Indian Wells, Miami, Madrid, and Rome), losing to Shelby Rogers in consecutive matches. In Madrid, she reached the semifinals in doubles alongside Lyudmyla Kichenok, losing to eventual champions Gabriela Dabrowski and Giuliana Olmos. At the French Open, Ostapenko lost in the second round to Alizé Cornet, in three sets. In doubles at the same tournament, she reached the semifinals of a major for the first time, partnering again with Kichenok.

At Wimbledon, Ostapenko reached the fourth round in singles losing to Tatjana Maria, after missing two match points. At the same tournament, she reached the doubles semifinals with Kichenok, and the mixed doubles quarterfinals, partnering Robert Farah. At the Cincinnati Open, she defeated Beatriz Haddad Maia in the second round, before losing to Madison Keys. In doubles with Kichenok, she reached the final, defeating Australian Open finalists Haddad Maia and Anna Danilina and top seeds Kudermetova and Mertens. The pair won their biggest title defeating Nicole Melichar and Ellen Perez. As a result, Ostapenko made her top 10 debut at No. 9 in the doubles rankings on 22 August 2022, and reached a career-high doubles ranking of No. 7 on 12 September 2022 after a third round showing at the US Open.

Ostapenko and Kichenok qualified for the 2022 WTA Finals, where they reached the semifinals. She ended the season ranked No. 18 in singles and No. 14 in doubles.

=== 2023: Australian and US Open quarterfinals ===
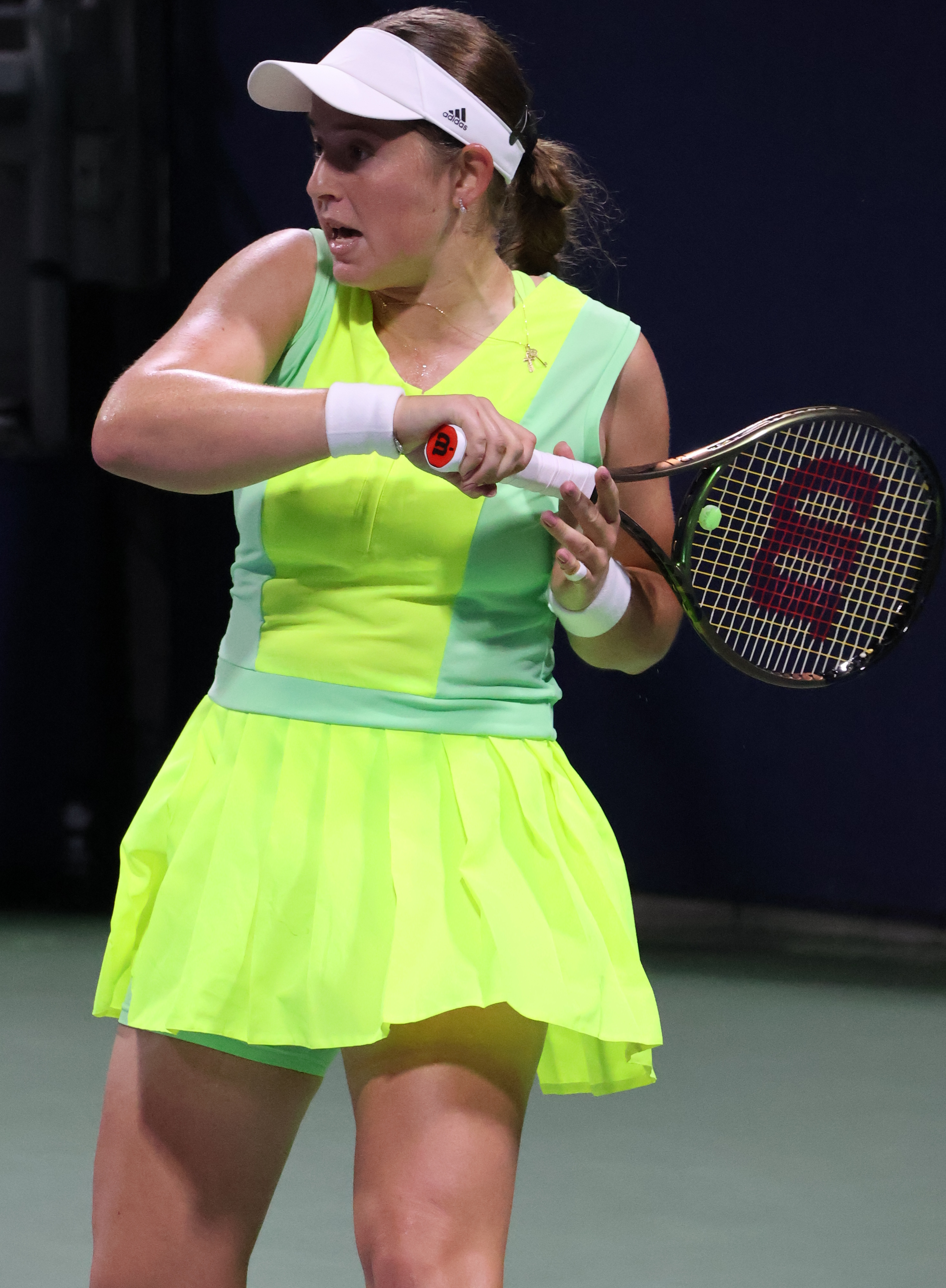
Ostapenko at the 2023 US Open

Ostapenko became the first Latvian women's player to reach the quarterfinals of the Australian Open, defeating top-10 player Coco Gauff en route. This was only the fourth Major quarterfinal of her career and the first since the 2018 Wimbledon Championships. She lost to eventual finalist Elena Rybakina in straight sets.

In May, Ostapenko reached her first Italian Open semifinal, defeating Barbora Krejčíková, Daria Kasatkina, and Paula Badosa en route; this was her first clay semifinal since winning the 2017 French Open. She lost to eventual champion Elena Rybakina, in straight sets.

At the Birmingham Classic, Ostapenko lifted the Maud Watson Trophy, after again defeating top-seeded Barbora Krejčíková in the final. At Wimbledon, she reached the second round losing to Sorana Cîrstea in three sets.

Seeded 20th at the US Open, Ostapenko upset defending champion Iga Świątek, getting her first win over a world No. 1 since 2017, and making her first quarterfinal at this major. However, she lost to American teenager and eventual champion, Coco Gauff. At the WTA 1000 China Open, she reached the quarterfinals defeating fourth seed Jessica Pegula, her 20th top 10 win, before losing to Liudmila Samsonova.

=== 2024: Doubles: US Open title, world No. 6 ===
She reached the final at Adelaide by defeating Sorana Cirstea, Caroline Garcia, Marta Kostyuk and Ekaterina Alexandrova. As a result, Ostapenko returned to the top 10 in the rankings after five years of absence. She defeated Daria Kasatkina in the final to win her seventh singles title and third WTA 500 overall.

At the Australian Open, she reached the third round in singles, losing to 18th seed Victoria Azarenka. At the same tournament, she reached her first major final in doubles with her usual partner Lyudmyla Kichenok, defeating reigning US Open champions and fourth seeds Gabriela Dabrowski and Erin Routliffe, in straight sets. Ostapenko became the first Latvian finalist at the event.

She reached her second WTA 500 final of the season at the Ladies Linz, defeating Anastasia Pavlyuchenkova. She won her second title of the season and eight overall defeating Ekaterina Alexandrova, her second win over the Russian for the season. It was the first time since 2017 that she won multiple titles in a season.

She reached her third singles quarterfinal at Wimbledon with wins over Ajla Tomljanović, qualifier Daria Snigur, Bernarda Pera and Yulia Putintseva before losing to eventual champion Barbora Krejčíková. At the same tournament, in doubles, she also reached the quarterfinals with partner Lyudmyla Kichenok.

She entered the US Open seeded 10th in singles, but was defeated in the first round by wildcard entrant and previous two-time US Open champion Naomi Osaka. In doubles at the same tournament, she reached her second Slam final for the season with her partner Lyudmyla Kichenok, defeating Anna Danilina and Irina Khromacheva in the quarterfinal, and then Veronika Kudermetova and Chan Hao-ching in the semifinal also in straight sets. Ostapenko became only the second Latvian finalist at the event at the US Open. Ostapenko and Kichenok defeated Kristina Mladenovic and Zhang Shuai in the final in straight sets to lift their first a Grand Slam trophy together, becoming the first Latvian and Ukrainian champions in women's doubles at the US Open. Ostapenko became also the first Latvian to win a Grand Slam title in doubles. As a result she reached a new career-high of world No. 6 in the doubles rankings on 9 September 2024. She and Kichenok also surged to No.1 in the Race to the WTA Finals after the tournament.

Ostapenko and Kichenok qualified for the end-of-season WTA Finals in Riyadh, Saudi Arabia, as top seeds but were eliminated in the group stages after losing all three of their matches.

=== 2025: Second Qatar final, World No. 3 in doubles ===
Partnering Hsieh Su-wei, Ostapenko reached the doubles final at the Australian Open, losing to top seeds Kateřina Siniaková and Taylor Townsend in three sets. At the start of the Middle Eastern swing, she lifted the title in Abu Dhabi with first-time partner Ellen Perez. At the Qatar Ladies Open, she reached the quarterfinals, recording her first top 10 win of 2025 and 12th career top 5 win, with an upset over fourth seed Jasmine Paolini. Ostapenko proceeded to defeat three-time champion and world No. 2, Iga Świątek, in the semifinal, but lost the final to Amanda Anisimova in straight sets.

Partnering Erin Routliffe, she won the doubles title at the Charleston Open in April, defeating Caroline Dolehide and Desirae Krawczyk in the final. Also in April, she won the Stuttgart Open in straight sets against first seed Aryna Sabalenka, after defeating Ekaterina Alexandrova in the semifinals and beating Iga Świątek for the sixth time in a row in the quarterfinals. Partnering Hsieh Su-wei, she reached the doubles final at Wimbledon, losing to Veronika Kudermetova and Elise Mertens in three sets.

At the US Open, after losing her second round match to Taylor Townsend, Ostapenko felt "disrespected" because Townsend had not apologised for a dead net cord during play. A heated exchange ensued when the match concluded, with Ostapenko saying her opponent had “no class” and “no education.” Ostapenko later apologised for her remarks in a statement released on social media.

Alongside Hsieh Su-wei, she qualified for the WTA Finals, losing to Timea Babos and Luisa Stefani in the semifinals.

=== 2026: Wimbledon mixed doubles title ===
Ostapenko began her 2026 season at the Brisbane International, where she teamed up with Hsieh Su-wei to win the doubles title, defeating Cristina Bucșa and Ellen Perez in the final.

In February she reached the semifinals at the Qatar Ladies Open, at which point her run was halted by 10th seed Victoria Mboko. At the Linz Open in April, Ostapenko defeated Alexandra Eala in the second round to reach the quarterfinals, where she was defeated by Elena-Gabriela Ruse. The following week at the Stuttgart Grand Prix, she partnered with Zhang Shuai to make it through to the doubles final, which they lost to Nicole Melichar-Martinez and Liudmila Samsonova in straight sets.

Ostapenko reached the quarterfinals at the Italian Open with a run which included wins over Zheng Qinwen and 22nd seed Anna Kalinskaya. She lost to 26th seed Sorana Cirstea in the last eight. Seeded third at the Eastbourne Open, Ostapenko reached the semifinals where she faced Tatjana Maria but retired after feeling unwell during a rain delay having lost the first set.

Teaming up with Marcelo Arévalo, she won the mixed doubles title at Wimbledon, defeating Marc Polmans and Storm Hunter in the final. In October at the Wuhan Open, Ostapenko defeated second seed Jessica Pegula and 11th seed Diana Shnaider en route to the semifinals, where she lost to Sonay Kartal.

== Playing style ==
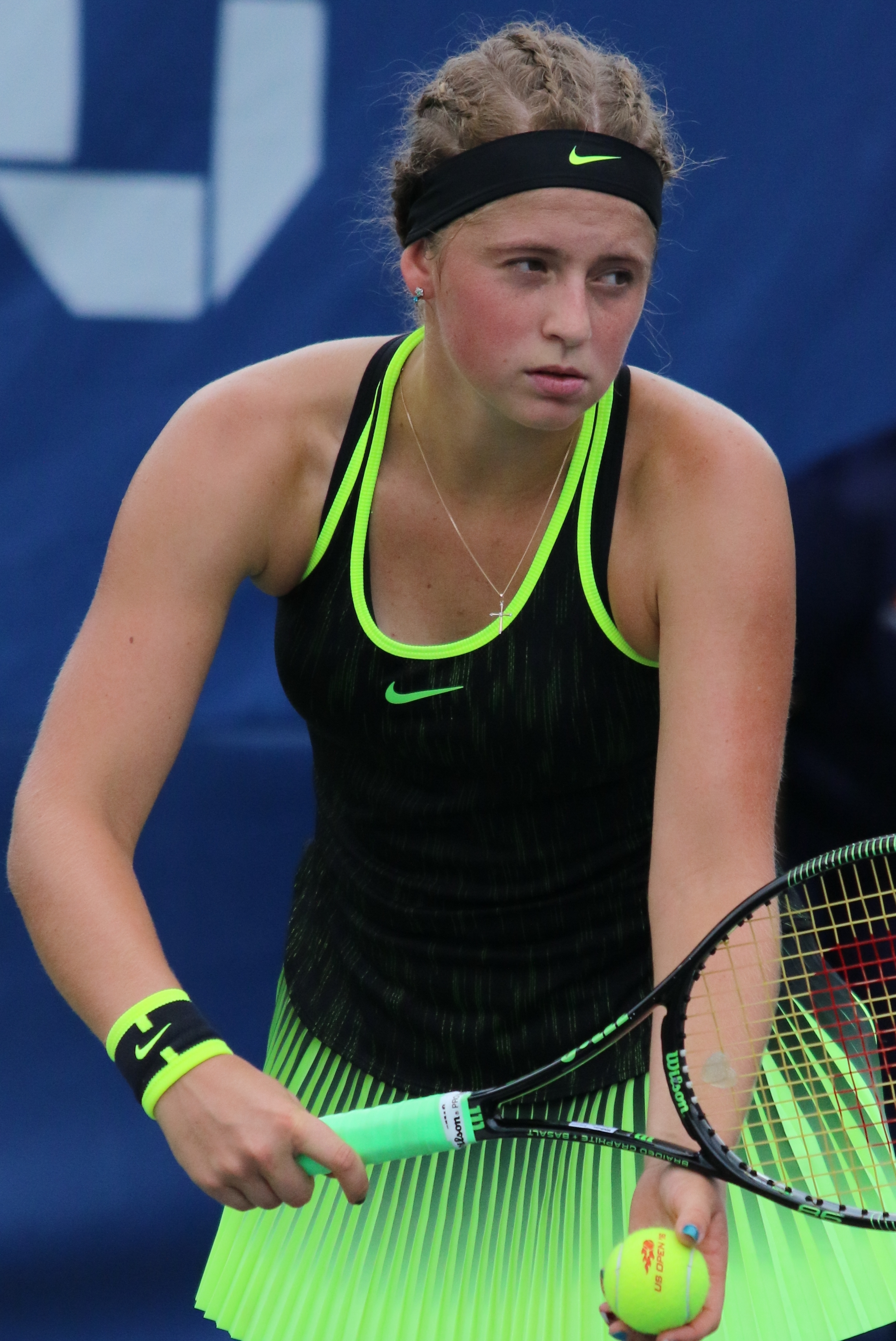
Ostapenko at the 2016 US Open

Ostapenko is an aggressive baseliner, with an attacking playing style. In a 2017 article, Steve Tignor of Tennis.com described Ostapenko's mentality as "See ball, hit winner." Eurosport labeled her style as "risky, aggressive, fun tennis".

Her forehand and backhand are both hit flat, with relentless power and depth. In a 2016 interview, Crosscourt View labeled Ostapenko's backhand her "strongest weapon"; the same year, Hartford Courant stated that she "hits a lot of forehand winners". Due to her aggressive playing style, she accumulates significant numbers of both winners and unforced errors. She aims to finish points quickly, either with powerful groundstrokes or deft volleys. Ostapenko moves opponents around the court by aiming long strokes at corners and lines, and then changes direction to hit powerful winners. After putting an opponent in a vulnerable position, she regularly seeks to end the point with a cross-court forehand, a down-the-line backhand, a swinging volley, or a drop shot. Before her participation in the 2017 Charleston Open final, an article on the event's website declared that what was "most impressive about Ostapenko is her willingness to strike big to all corners of the court, be it a cross-court laser or a bold down-the-line winner." One of her major weaknesses is a high error rate due to her high-risk approach.

At the 2017 French Open, where Ostapenko won her first professional title, she regularly hit between 35 and 45 winners throughout her matches. Following her quarterfinal performance, she attracted multiple comparisons to Monica Seles. Ostapenko said in an interview at the event that "aggressive is my style of game". After the final match of that French Open, analysts highlighted the differences between her performance and opponent Simona Halep's performance: Ostapenko had 54 winners and 54 unforced errors, while Halep had eight winners and ten unforced errors. ESPN's Simon Cambers wrote: "Fear just does not seem to come into [Ostapenko's] vocabulary... Her groundstrokes are simply massive, flat swipes of the ball that left Halep... grasping at shadows."

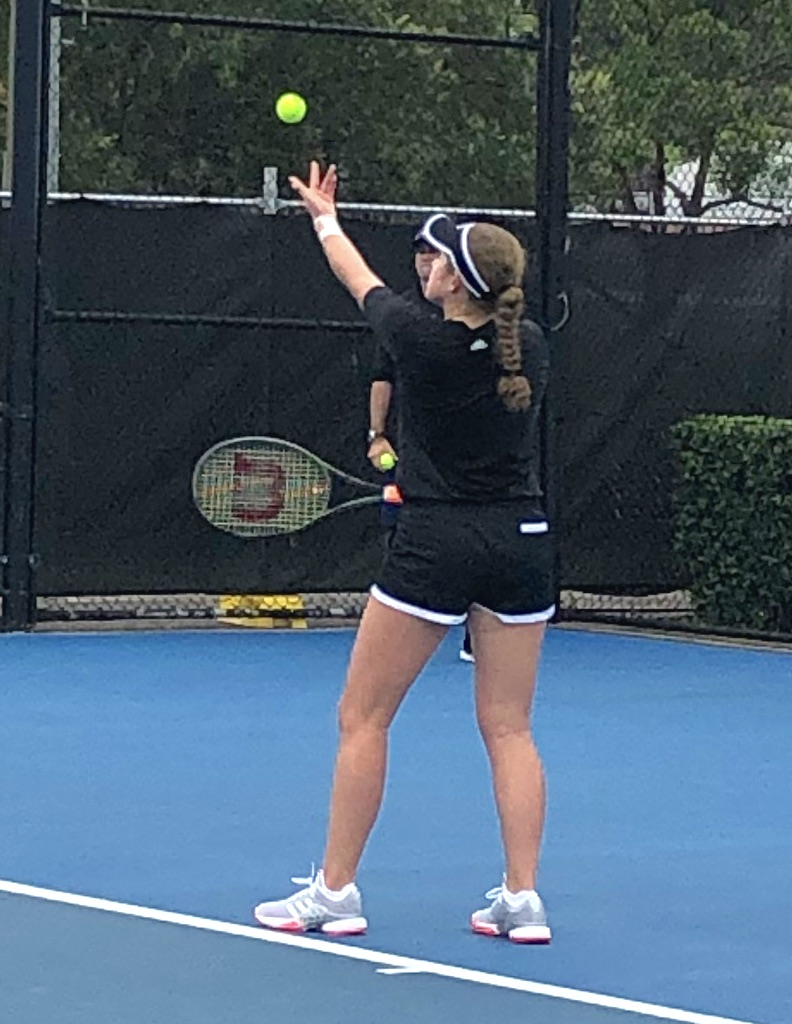
Ostapenko serving during practice at the 2019 Sydney International

The major weakness in Ostapenko's game is her serve, which is highly inconsistent. Her first serve is powerful, being typically recorded at 106 mph (170 km/h), and peaking at 112 mph (180 km/h), allowing her to serve aces, while her second serve is inconsistent. Her second serve is hampered by nerves, and a frequently wayward ball toss, meaning that she double faults frequently. In 2017 and 2019, she was the WTA Tour leader in double faults, hitting 436 double faults in 2019. She also frequently has one of the lowest first serve percentages on the entire tour; in her first-round match at the 2019 China Open against Karolína Plíšková, she served 25 double faults, and had a first-serve percentage of 49%, while still winning the match. However, after being coached by Marion Bartoli at Linz for the first time, her serve began to show some improvement, and in the final against Julia Görges at Luxembourg, she did not double fault once.

Ostapenko is the only player to reliably beat Iga Świątek, having as of April 2025 a record of six wins and no losses.

== Equipment ==
Ostapenko uses Wilson Blade racquets, but is currently without an apparel sponsor, having previously been sponsored by Adidas for clothing and shoes; and Nike prior to that. At the Australian Open, French Open and Wimbledon 2022 she wore DK ONE, a Latvian brand.

== Coaches ==
Ostapenko is coached by her mother. In 2017, she also trained with two-time French Open doubles champion Anabel Medina Garrigues. She parted company with Medina Garrigues at the end of 2017, taking on David Taylor – former coach of Sam Stosur and Ana Ivanovic – to coach her for the majors, with her mother remaining as her full-time coach. In October 2019, Ostapenko partnered with 2013 Wimbledon champion Marion Bartoli on a trial basis; their partnership resulted in Ostapenko reaching two finals in two weeks, and winning the title in Luxembourg. Bartoli announced that their partnership would continue into 2020, and that she would be Ostapenko's full time coach throughout the year. After a poor start to the 2020 season, and Bartoli's pregnancy, Ostapenko ended their partnership during the suspension of the WTA Tour due to the COVID-19 pandemic, and began to be coached on a trial basis by Thomas Högstedt, the former coach of Maria Sharapova and Simona Halep. This partnership was not extended into 2021, and Bartoli began coaching Ostapenko once again in February 2021, following the birth of her daughter, at Doha. Ostapenko subsequently started working with Ukrainian coach Stas Khmarsky.

== Rivalries ==
=== Ekaterina Alexandrova ===
Ostapenko and Ekaterina Alexandrova have met eleven times since 2015, with Ostapenko leading the head-to-head 6–5.

=== Karolína Plíšková ===
Ostapenko and Karolína Plíšková have met eleven times since 2016, with Ostapenko leading the head-to-head at 6–5.

=== Iga Świątek ===
Ostapenko and Iga Świątek have met six times since 2019. Ostapenko has won every match on every single surface, making her the only active player to have an undefeated record against Świątek across multiple matches. Their encounters span all surfaces, with Ostapenko claiming key wins at the 2023 US Open and the 2025 Stuttgart Open. Her aggressive, high-risk style has consistently unsettled Świątek.

== Career statistics ==
=== Grand Slam performance timeline ===
Key
W	F	SF	QF	#R	RR	Q#	DNQ	A	NH

(W) winner; (F) finalist; (SF) semifinalist; (QF) quarterfinalist; (#R) rounds 4, 3, 2, 1; (RR) round-robin stage; (Q#) qualification round; (DNQ) did not qualify; (A) absent; (NH) not held; (SR) strike rate (events won / competed); (W–L) win–loss record.
To avoid confusion and double counting, these charts are updated at the conclusion of a tournament or when the player's participation has ended.

==== Singles ====
Tournament	2015	2016	2017	2018	2019	2020	2021	2022	2023	2024	2025	2026	SR	W–L	Win%
Australian Open	A	1R	3R	3R	1R	2R	1R	3R	QF	3R	1R	2R	0 / 11	14–11	56%
French Open	Q1	1R	W	1R	1R	3R	1R	2R	2R	2R	3R	2R	1 / 11	15–10	60%
Wimbledon	2R	1R	QF	SF	1R	NH	3R	4R	2R	QF	1R	3R	0 / 11	22–11	67%
US Open	2R	1R	3R	3R	3R	A	A	1R	QF	1R	2R		0 / 9	12–9	57%
Win–loss	2–2	0–4	15–3	9–4	2–4	3–2	2–3	6–4	10–4	7–4	3–4	4–3	1 / 41	63–40	61%

==== Doubles ====
Tournament	2015	2016	2017	2018	2019	2020	2021	2022	2023	2024	2025	2026	SR	W–L	Win%
Australian Open	A	1R	1R	1R	2R	QF	3R	2R	1R	F	F	QF (Note: Ostapenko received a walkover in the second round of 2024 Wimbledon and in the second round of 2026 Australian Open, which does not count as a win.)	0 / 11	19–11	63%
French Open	A	1R	1R	1R	QF	3R	3R	SF	2R	2R	2R		0 / 10	13–10	57%
Wimbledon	A	3R	1R	3R (Note: Withdrew during the tournament, not counted as a loss.)	1R	NH	2R	SF	1R	QF	F		0 / 9	16–7	70%
US Open	A	2R	1R	1R	QF	A	A	3R	2R	W	1R		1 / 8	13–7	65%
Win–loss	0–0	3–4	0–4	2–3	6–4	5–2	5–2	11–4	2–4	14–3	11–4	2–1	1 / 37	61–35	63%

=== Grand Slam tournaments ===
==== Singles: 1 (title) ====
Result	Year	Tournament	Surface	Opponent	Score
Win	2017	French Open	Clay	(Romania) Simona Halep	4–6, 6–4, 6–3

==== Doubles: 4 (1 title, 3 runner-ups) ====
Result	Year	Tournament	Surface	Partner	Opponents	Score
Loss	2024	Australian Open	Hard	(Ukraine) Lyudmyla Kichenok	(Chinese Taipei) Hsieh Su-wei (Belgium) Elise Mertens	1–6, 5–7
Win	2024	US Open	Hard	(Ukraine) Lyudmyla Kichenok	(France) Kristina Mladenovic (China) Zhang Shuai	6–4, 6–3
Loss	2025	Australian Open	Hard	(Chinese Taipei) Hsieh Su-wei	(Czech Republic) Kateřina Siniaková (United States) Taylor Townsend	2–6, 7–6^{(7–4)}, 3–6
Loss	2025	Wimbledon	Grass	(Chinese Taipei) Hsieh Su-wei	Veronika Kudermetova (Belgium) Elise Mertens	6–3, 2–6, 4–6

==== Mixed doubles: 2 (1 title, 1 runner-up) ====
Result	Year	Tournament	Surface	Partner	Opponents	Score
Loss	2019	Wimbledon	Grass	(Sweden) Robert Lindstedt	(Chinese Taipei) Latisha Chan (Croatia) Ivan Dodig	2–6, 3–6
Win	2026	Wimbledon	Grass	(El Salvador) Marcelo Arevalo	(Australia) Storm Hunter (Australia) Marc Polmans	4–6, 7–5, 6–2

=== Records ===
Between 2016 and 2019, Ostapenko was the only player to have won a Grand Slam title (2017 French Open), but lost in the first round the three other times she had competed at the same tournament (2016 to Naomi Osaka, 2018 to Kateryna Baindl, and 2019 to Victoria Azarenka). This run ended in 2020, as she advanced to the second round, after beating Madison Brengle.

== Awards ==
Year	Awards
2014	Latvian Sports Rising Star of the Year
2016	WTA Tour Breakthrough of the Month (February)
2017	WTA Tour Breakthrough of the Month (May)
2017	WTA Tour Most Improved Player of the Year
2017	Latvian Sportswoman of the Year

== Notes ==
Awards
Preceded by Zemgus Girgensons	Latvian Rising Sports Personality of the Year; 2014	Succeeded by Kristaps Porziņģis
Preceded by Laura Ikauniece-Admidiņa	Latvian Sportswoman of the Year; 2017	Succeeded by Anastasija Sevastova
Olympic Games
Preceded by Māris Štrombergs	Flagbearer for Latvia (with Agnis Čavars); Tokyo 2020	Succeeded by Tīna Graudiņa; Nauris Miezis
