= Edgars Krūmiņš (basketball) =

Latvian basketball player (born 1985)

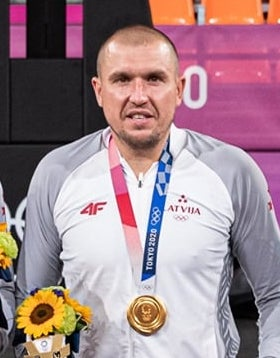
- Krūmiņš in 2021

Personal information
- Born: 16 October 1985 (age 41) Jelgava, Latvia
- Listed height: 1.95 m (6 ft 5 in)
- Listed weight: 105 kg (231 lb)

Career information
- NBA draft: 2008: undrafted
- Position: Guard/forward

Career highlights
- FIBA 3x3 World Tour winner (2020)
Medals
Men's 3x3 basketball
Representing Latvia
Olympic Games
Gold medal – first place	2020 Tokyo	Team
World Cup
Silver medal – second place	2019 Amsterdam
European Championships
Gold medal – first place	2017 Amsterdam
Silver medal – second place	2018 Bucharest
Silver medal – second place	2022 Graz

Edgars Krūmiņš (born 16 October 1985) is a Latvian basketball player for the Latvian 3x3 national team.

He represented Latvia at the 2020 Summer Olympics. Despite Krūmiņš suffering an injury late in the game, Latvia won the gold medal by defeating the Russian Olympic Committee team 21 to 18.
