= Kārlis Lasmanis =

Latvian basketball player

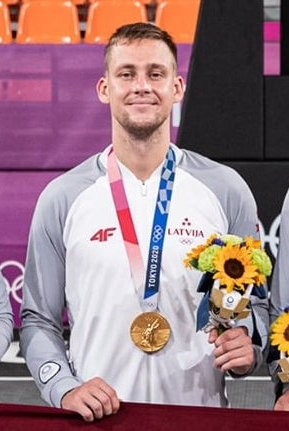
- Lasmanis in 2021

Personal information
- Born: 8 April 1994 (age 32) Ventspils, Latvia
- Listed height: 2.00 m (6 ft 7 in)
- Listed weight: 87 kg (192 lb)

Career information
- Playing career: 2012–present
- Position: Forward

Career history
- 2016–2022: Riga (3x3)
- 2022–: Aliens (3x3)

Career highlights
- Olympic Games Top Scorer (2020); FIBA 3x3 World Tour winner (2020); FIBA 3x3 World Cup Team of the Tournament (2019); FIBA 3x3 Europe Cup Top Scorer (2018); FIBA 3x3 Europe Cup Team of the Tournament (2018)
Medals
Men's 3x3 basketball
Representing Latvia
Olympic Games
Gold medal – first place	2020 Tokyo	Team
World Cup
Gold medal – first place	2026 Warsaw	Team
Silver medal – second place	2019 Amsterdam	Team
Bronze medal – third place	2023 Vienna	Team
Europe Cup
Gold medal – first place	2017 Amsterdam
Silver medal – second place	2018 Bucharest
Silver medal – second place	2022 Graz
Bronze medal – third place	2023 Jerusalem

Kārlis Pauls Lasmanis (born 8 April 1994) is a Latvian basketball player for the Latvian 3x3 national team.

He represented Latvia at the 2020 Summer Olympics, sinking the game-winning two-pointer that won Latvia the gold medal. With 76 points, he was the top scorer of the tournament. He was also the top scorer of the 2024 Olympics tournament with 67 points.

His father, Uģis Lasmanis is a former rower who participated in two Olympics, while his sister, Rūta Kate Lasmane is a long jumper and triple jumper.
