= Nauris Miezis =

Latvian basketball player (born 1991)

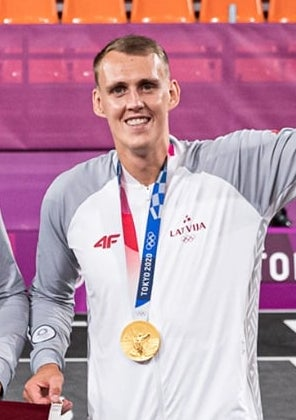
- Miezis in 2021

Personal information
- Born: 31 March 1991 (age 35) Ķekava, Latvia
- Listed height: 1.90 m (6 ft 3 in)
- Listed weight: 90 kg (198 lb)

Career information
- NBA draft: 2013: undrafted
- Position: Guard

Career highlights
- Olympic Games winner (2020); FIBA 3x3 World Cup Team of the Tournament (2023); FIBA 3x3 Europe Cup winner (2017); FIBA 3x3 Europe Cup MVP (2017); FIBA 3x3 Europe Cup Team of the Tournament (2017); FIBA 3x3 World Tour winner (2020); FIBA 3x3 World Tour MVP (2020)
Medals
Men's 3x3 basketball
Representing Latvia
Olympic Games
Gold medal – first place	2020 Tokyo	Team
World Cup
Gold medal – first place	2026 Warsaw	Team
Silver medal – second place	2019 Amsterdam	Team
Bronze medal – third place	2023 Vienna	Team
Europe Cup
Gold medal – first place	2017 Amsterdam	Team
Gold medal – first place	2026 Antwerp	Team
Silver medal – second place	2018 Bucharest	Team
Silver medal – second place	2022 Graz
Silver medal – second place	2025 Copenhagen	Team

Nauris Miezis (born 31 March 1991) is a Latvian basketball player for the Latvian 3x3 national team.

He represented Latvia at the 2020 Summer Olympics and was one of the four players in the team who won the gold medal by defeating the Russian Olympic Committee team 21 to 18.

In 2024, Miezis was the first person to win as part of Rīgas Zeļļi's center shot halftime competition at the team's 12th home game.

Olympic Games
Preceded by Jeļena Ostapenko; Agnis Čavars	Flagbearer for Latvia; Paris 2024; With: Tīna Graudiņa	Succeeded by Incumbent
