= Gymnastics at the 2026 Asian Games – Men's trampoline =

Men's trampoline at the 2026 Asian Games

Men's individual at the 2026 Asian Games
- Venue: Nagoya General Gymnasium Rainbow Hall
- Date: 27 September 2026
- Competitors: 12 from 7 nations

Medalists
gold medal	Yan Langyu	China
silver medal	Wang Zisai	China
bronze medal	Yerlan Tasmagambetov	Kazakhstan

The men's trampoline competition at the 2026 Asian Games took place on 27 September 2026 at the Nagoya General Gymnasium Rainbow Hall in Nagoya, Japan.

== Schedule ==
All times are Japan Standard Time (UTC+09:00)

Date	Time	Event
Sunday, 27 September 2026	11:30	Qualification
Sunday, 27 September 2026	13:00	Final
Sunday, 27 September 2026	Follow by	Super Final

== Results ==
=== Qualification ===
Rank	Athlete	Routine 1	Routine 2	Best	Notes
1	Wang Zisai (CHN)	63.56	65.15	65.15	Q
2	Yusei Matsumoto (JPN)	63.16	43.67	63.16	Q
3	Yan Langyu (CHN)	59.88	39.70	59.88	Q
4	Daiki Kishi (JPN)	58.60		58.60	Q
5	Aria Mam Abdollah (IRI)	56.08	57.74	57.74	Q
6	Roman Barkov (KAZ)	56.64	18.72	56.64	Q
7	Yerlan Tasmagambetov (KAZ)	54.93	29.61	54.93	Q
8	Mohammad Saeidabadi (IRI)	52.04	53.86	53.86	Q
9	Komron Gaibov (TJK)	5.94	52.04	52.04	R1
10	Lee Kwun Wai (HKG)	47.25	48.25	48.25	R2
11	Jerry Ilano Jr. (PHI)	47.00		47.00	
12	Lau Long Fung Ronald (HKG)	43.85	41.19	43.85	

=== Final ===
Rank	Athlete	D Score	E Score	T Score	H Score	Pen	Total	Notes
1	Wang Zisai (CHN)	19.50	17.00	17.47	9.60		63.57	Q
2	Yan Langyu (CHN)	17.50	17.00	17.27	9.50		61.27	Q
3	Yusei Matsumoto (JPN)	21.10	13.50	16.92	9.50		61.02	Q
4	Yerlan Tasmagambetov (KAZ)	16.60	15.30	16.74	9.40		58.04	Q
5	Aria Mam Abdollah (IRI)	17.30	14.90	15.77	9.60		57.57	
6	Daiki Kishi (JPN)	18.20	13.80	15.36	8.30		55.66	
7	Mohammad Saeidabadi (IRI)	14.70	14.90	15.16	9.00		53.76	
8	Roman Barkov (KAZ)	14.10	11.70	13.73	7.40		46.93	

=== Super Final ===
Rank	Athlete	D Score	E Score	T Score	H Score	Pen	Total
1st place, gold medalist(s)	Yan Langyu (CHN)	21.70	16.50	17.69	9.20		65.09
2nd place, silver medalist(s)	Wang Zisai (CHN)	19.50	17.30	17.43	9.60		63.83
3rd place, bronze medalist(s)	Yerlan Tasmagambetov (KAZ)	13.60	15.70	15.99	9.40		54.69
4	Yusei Matsumoto (JPN)	12.30	7.80	10.31	5.10		35.51
