= Fabian Vogel =

German trampoline gymnast (born 1995)

- Born: 12 March 1995 (age 31) Düsseldorf, Germany

Gymnastics career
- Discipline: Trampoline gymnastics
- Country represented: Germany
- Training location: Bad Kreuznach, Germany
- Club: MTV Bad Kreuznach
- Head coach: Steffen Eislöffel
Medal record
Men's trampoline gymnastics
Representing Germany
World Games
Bronze medal – third place	2025 Chengdu	Synchro
World Championships
Gold medal – first place	2022 Sofia	Synchro
Gold medal – first place	2023 Birmingham	Synchro
Silver medal – second place	2021 Baku	Synchro
Bronze medal – third place	2022 Sofia	Individual team
European Championships
Gold medal – first place	2022 Rimini	Synchro
Silver medal – second place	2024 Guimarães	Individual team
Bronze medal – third place	2021 Sochi	Synchro

Fabian Vogel (born 12 March 1995) is a German trampoline gymnast. He is a two-time World Champion (2022, 2023) in synchronized trampoline and a five-time German champion (2019, 2021–24) in individual trampoline. He is also the 2022 European champion in synchro. He represented Germany at the 2024 Summer Olympics, finishing 11th in the individual event.

== Early life ==
Vogel was born on 12 March 1995 in Düsseldorf. His father and grandfather both competed in track and field, but Vogel was interested in trampoline gymnastics and began the sport at age seven.

== Career ==
Vogel won the bronze medal at the 2015 Valladolid World Cup with his synchro partner Kyrylo Sonn. They then won the silver medal at the 2015 Mouilleron World Cup.

Vogel won his first European medal in 2021 alongside his synchro partner Caio Lauxtermann. He then competed with Matthias Pfleiderer at the 2021 World Championships, and they won the silver medal.

Vogel and Pfleiderer won the silver medal in the synchro event at the 2022 Arosa World Cup. They also won a gold medal at the 2022 European Championships. At the 2022 World Championships, he helped the German trampoline team win the bronze medal. Then in the synchro event, he won the gold medal alongside long-time partner Pfleiderer.

Vogel competed with Lauxtermann at the 2023 Baku World Cup, and they won the silver medal despite Lauxtermann landing off the trampoline on the final element. They also won the silver medal at the Coimbra World Cup and the bronze medal at the Varna World Cup. Vogel and Lauxtermann were declared the overall winners of the 2023 World Cup series. At the 2023 World Championships, Vogel won his second-consecutive synchro World title, this time alongside Lauxtermann.

Vogel and Lauxtermann won the gold medal at the 2024 Cottbus World Cup. He then won a silver medal at the 2024 European Championships alongside the German team. Vogel qualified as an individual for the 2024 Summer Olympics through his 2024 World Cup series results. He finished 11th in the qualification round, missing out on the eight-person final.
