= Gymnastics at the 2024 Summer Olympics – Men's trampoline =

Men's trampoline at the Games of the XXXIII Olympiad
- Venue: Accor Arena
- Date: 2 August 2024
- Competitors: 16 from 15 nations
- Winning score: 63.090

Medalists
1st place, gold medalist(s)		Ivan Litvinovich	Individual Neutral Athletes
2nd place, silver medalist(s)		Wang Zisai	China
3rd place, bronze medalist(s)		Yan Langyu	China

The men's trampoline competition at the 2024 Summer Olympics took place on 2 August 2024 at the Accor Arena (referred to as the Bercy Arena due to IOC sponsorship rules).

== Schedule ==
All times are Central European Summer Time (UTC+2)

Date	Time	Round
2 August	18:00	Qualification
2 August	19:50	Final

== Results ==
=== Qualification ===
Qualification rules: the top eight gymnasts with the highest scores (out of two routines) qualify for the final. Highest score is bolded.

Rank	Athlete	1st routine	2nd routine	Highest score	Qual.
1	Ivan Litvinovich (AIN)	**63.420**	42.580	63.420	Q
2	Wang Zisai (CHN)	60.950	**62.230**	62.230	Q
3	Yan Langyu (CHN)	61.420	**62.220**	62.220	Q
4	Dylan Schmidt (NZL)	59.510	**60.810**	60.810	Q
5	Gabriel Albuquerque (POR)	**59.750**	31.070	59.750	Q
6	Pierre Gouzou (FRA)	58.520	**59.100**	59.100	Q
7	Zak Perzamanos (GBR)	58.800	**59.030**	59.030	Q
8	Ángel Hernández (COL)	57.900	**58.640**	58.640	Q
9	Danil Mussabayev (KAZ)	**58.070**	52.550	58.070	R1
10	Aliaksei Shostak (USA)	**57.350**	6.120	57.350	R2
11	Fabian Vogel (GER)	29.120	**56.890**	56.890	—
12	Rayan Dutra (BRA)	**56.370**	56.210	56.370	—
13	Brock Batty (AUS)	**55.890**	23.150	55.890	—
14	David Vega (ESP)	**55.620**	28.160	55.620	—
15	Benny Wizani (AUT)	**54.990**	12.460	54.990	—
16	Ryusei Nishioka (JPN)	24.710	**35.750**	35.750	—

=== Final ===
Rank	Athlete	D Score	E Score	T Score	H Score	Pen	Total
1st place, gold medalist(s)	Ivan Litvinovich (AIN)	18.400	16.700	18.490	9.500		63.090
2nd place, silver medalist(s)	Wang Zisai (CHN)	18.000	17.000	17.590	9.300		61.890
3rd place, bronze medalist(s)	Yan Langyu (CHN)	17.800	16.600	17.850	8.900	-0.200	60.950
4	Zak Perzamanos (GBR)	18.500	14.300	17.540	9.500		59.840
5	Gabriel Albuquerque (POR)	18.000	15.500	17.240	9.000		59.740
6	Pierre Gouzou (FRA)	17.100	15.600	16.940	9.300		58.940
7	Ángel Hernández (COL)	16.000	13.700	15.250	8.200		53.150
8	Dylan Schmidt (NZL)	6.300	5.000	5.500	2.700		19.500
