= China at the 2024 Summer Olympics =

- IOC code: CHN
- NOC: Chinese Olympic Committee
- Website: www.olympic.cn (in Chinese and English)

in Paris, France 26 July 2024 – 11 August 2024
- Competitors: 388 in 33 sports
- Flag bearers (opening): Ma Long & Feng Yu
- Flag bearers (closing): Li Fabin & Ou Zixia
- Medals Ranked 2nd: Gold 40 Silver 27 Bronze 24 Total 91

Summer Olympics appearances (overview)
- 1952; 1956–1980; 1984; 1988; 1992; 1996; 2000; 2004; 2008; 2012; 2016; 2020; 2024; 2028

Other related appearances
- Republic of China (1924–1948)

The People's Republic of China competed at the 2024 Summer Olympics in Paris from 26 July to 11 August 2024. It was the nation's twelfth appearance at the Summer Olympics since its debut in 1952. However, China did not participate in the next seven games: 1956; the nation was absent in 1960 and 1964 over a dispute with Taiwan; 1968; 1972 due to issues with GANEFO; 1976 due to Republic of China boycott; and 1980, joining the US led boycott. The nation has participated in every Olympics since the 1984 Summer Olympics.

China competed in every single sport except for football and handball.

China finished the 2024 Games with 91 medals, including 40 gold medals, 27 silver medals and 24 bronze medals. This performance tied them with the United States for having the most gold medals among NOCs, with China finishing second in the medal table due to having fewer silvers. Additionally, China became the only country, besides the United States and the former Soviet Union, to win the most gold medals at a Summer Olympics held outside their country. This achievement also represents a new record for the highest number of gold medals that China has won at an Olympics held outside their home soil, an improvement of one gold compared to their performance at the 2012 Summer Olympics in London.

== Medalists ==
Medal	Name	Sport	Event	Date
Gold	Huang Yuting; Sheng Lihao	Shooting	Mixed 10 m air rifle team	27 July
Gold	Chang Yani; Chen Yiwen	Diving	Women's synchronized 3 m springboard	27 July
Gold	Xie Yu	Shooting	Men's 10 m air pistol	28 July
Gold	Lian Junjie; Yang Hao	Diving	Men's synchronized 10 m platform	29 July
Gold	Sheng Lihao	Shooting	Men's 10 m air rifle	29 July
Gold	Wang Chuqin; Sun Yingsha	Table tennis	Mixed doubles	30 July
Gold	Chen Yuxi; Quan Hongchan	Diving	Women's synchronized 10 m platform	31 July
Gold	Deng Yawen	Cycling	Women's BMX freestyle	31 July
Gold	Pan Zhanle	Swimming	Men's 100 m freestyle	31 July
Gold	Liu Yukun	Shooting	Men's 50 m rifle three positions	1 August
Gold	Yang Jiayu	Athletics	Women's 20 km walk	1 August
Gold	Long Daoyi; Wang Zongyuan	Diving	Men's synchronized 3 m springboard	2 August
Gold	Zheng Siwei; Huang Yaqiong	Badminton	Mixed doubles	2 August
Gold	Chen Meng	Table tennis	Women's singles	3 August
Gold	Chen Qingchen; Jia Yifan	Badminton	Women's doubles	3 August
Gold	Zheng Qinwen	Tennis	Women's singles	3 August
Gold	Fan Zhendong	Table tennis	Men's singles	4 August
Gold	Liu Yang	Gymnastics	Men's rings	4 August
Gold	Xu Jiayu; Qin Haiyang; Sun Jiajun; Pan Zhanle; Wang Changhao^{[a]}	Swimming	Men's 4 × 100 m medley relay	4 August
Gold	Li Yuehong	Shooting	Men's 25 m rapid fire pistol	5 August
Gold	Zou Jingyuan	Gymnastics	Men's parallel bars	5 August
Gold	Quan Hongchan	Diving	Women's 10 m platform	6 August
Gold	Li Fabin	Weightlifting	Men's 61 kg	7 August
Gold	Chang Hao; Feng Yu; Wang Ciyue; Wang Liuyi; Wang Qianyi; Xiang Binxuan; Xiao Yanning; Zhang Yayi	Artistic swimming	Team event	7 August
Gold	Hou Zhihui	Weightlifting	Women's 49 kg	7 August
Gold	Liu Hao; Ji Bowen	Canoeing	Men's C-2 500 m	8 August
Gold	Xie Siyi	Diving	Men's 3 m springboard	8 August
Gold	Luo Shifang	Weightlifting	Women's 59 kg	8 August
Gold	Chang Yuan	Boxing	Women's 54 kg	8 August
Gold	Xu Shixiao; Sun Mengya	Canoeing	Women's C-2 500 m	9 August
Gold	Chen Yiwen	Diving	Women's 3 m springboard	9 August
Gold	Fan Zhendong; Ma Long; Wang Chuqin	Table tennis	Men's team	9 August
Gold	Wu Yu	Boxing	Women's 50 kg	9 August
Gold	Liu Huanhua	Weightlifting	Men's 102 kg	10 August
Gold	Ding Xinyi; Guo Qiqi; Hao Ting; Huang Zhangjiayang; Pu Yanzhu; Wang Lanjing	Gymnastics	Women's rhythmic group all-around	10 August
Gold	Cao Yuan	Diving	Men's 10 m platform	10 August
Gold	Chen Meng; Sun Yingsha; Wang Manyu	Table tennis	Women's team	10 August
Gold	Wang Liuyi; Wang Qianyi	Artistic swimming	Duet	10 August
Gold	Li Qian	Boxing	Women's 75 kg	10 August
Gold	Li Wenwen	Weightlifting	Women's +81 kg	11 August
Silver	An Qixuan; Li Jiaman; Yang Xiaolei	Archery	Women's team	28 July
Silver	Huang Yuting	Shooting	Women's 10 m air rifle	29 July
Silver	Liu Yang; Su Weide; Xiao Ruoteng; Zhang Boheng; Zou Jingyuan	Gymnastics	Men's artistic team all-around	29 July
Silver	Xu Jiayu	Swimming	Men's 100 m backstroke	29 July
Silver	Tang Qianting	Swimming	Women's 100 m breaststroke	29 July
Silver	Qi Ying	Shooting	Men's trap	30 July
Silver	Zhang Boheng	Gymnastics	Men's artistic individual all-around	31 July
Silver	Wang Zisai	Gymnastics	Men's trampoline	2 August
Silver	Wang Xinyu; Zhang Zhizhen	Tennis	Mixed doubles	2 August
Silver	Sun Yingsha	Table tennis	Women's singles	3 August
Silver	Liu Shengshu; Tan Ning	Badminton	Women's doubles	3 August
Silver	Qin Haiyang; Yang Junxuan; Xu Jiayu; Pan Zhanle^{[a]} Tang Qianting^{[a]} Zhang Yufei	Swimming	Mixed 4 × 100 m medley relay	3 August
Silver	Zou Jingyuan	Gymnastics	Men's rings	4 August
Silver	Qiu Qiyuan	Gymnastics	Women's uneven bars	4 August
Silver	Liang Weikeng; Wang Chang	Badminton	Men's doubles	4 August
Silver	He Bingjiao	Badminton	Women's singles	5 August
Silver	Zhou Yaqin	Gymnastics	Women's balance beam	5 August
Silver	Feng Bin	Athletics	Women's discus throw	5 August
Silver	Chen Yuxi	Diving	Women's 10 m platform	6 August
Silver	Cao Liguo	Wrestling	Men's Greco-Roman 60 kg	6 August
Silver	Yang Wenlu	Boxing	Women's 60 kg	6 August
Silver	Deng Lijuan	Sport climbing	Women's speed	7 August
Silver	Guo Qing	Taekwondo	Women's 49 kg	7 August
Silver	Wu Peng	Sport climbing	Men's speed	8 August
Silver	Wang Zongyuan	Diving	Men's 3 m springboard	8 August
Silver	China women's national field hockey team: Ye Jiao; Gu Bingfeng; Yang Liu; Zhang Ying; Chen Yi; Ma Ning; Li Hong; Ou Zixia; Dan Wen; Zou Meirong; He Jiangxin; Fan Yunxia; Chen Yang; Xu Wenyu; Zhong Jiaqi; Tan Jinzhuang; Yu Anhui	Field hockey	Women's tournament	9 August
Silver	Yang Liu	Boxing	Women's 66 kg	9 August
Bronze	Cheng Yujie; Wu Qingfeng; Yang Junxuan; Yu Yiting^{[a]} Zhang Yufei	Swimming	Women's 4 × 100 m freestyle relay	27 July
Bronze	Zhang Yufei	Swimming	Women's 100 m butterfly	28 July
Bronze	Xiao Ruoteng	Gymnastics	Men's artistic individual all-around	31 July
Bronze	Ma Zhenzhao	Judo	Women's 78 kg	1 August
Bronze	Zhang Yufei	Swimming	Women's 200 m butterfly	1 August
Bronze	Ge Chutong; Kong Yaqi^{[a]} Li Bingjie; Liu Yaxin; Tang Muhan^{[a]} Yang Junxuan	Swimming	Women's 4 × 200 m freestyle relay	1 August
Bronze	Zhang Qiongyue	Shooting	Women's 50 m rifle three positions	2 August
Bronze	Yan Langyu	Gymnastics	Men's trampoline	2 August
Bronze	Wang Shun	Swimming	Men's 200 m individual medley	2 August
Bronze	Zhang Yufei	Swimming	Women's 50 m freestyle	4 August
Bronze	Wan Letian; Tang Qianting; Zhang Yufei; Yang Junxuan; Wang Xue'er^{[a]} Yu Yiting^{[a]} Wu Qingfeng^{[a]}	Swimming	Women's 4 × 100 m medley relay	4 August
Bronze	Wang Xinjie	Shooting	Men's 25 m rapid fire pistol	5 August
Bronze	Zhang Boheng	Gymnastics	Men's horizontal bar	5 August
Bronze	Jiang Yiting; Lyu Jianlin	Shooting	Mixed skeet team	5 August
Bronze	Meng Lingzhe	Wrestling	Men's Greco-Roman 130 kg	6 August
Bronze	Zhao Jie	Athletics	Women's hammer throw	6 August
Bronze	Feng Ziqi	Wrestling	Women's freestyle 50 kg	7 August
Bronze	Pang Qianyu	Wrestling	Women's freestyle 53 kg	8 August
Bronze	Liang Yushuai	Taekwondo	Men's 68 kg	8 August
Bronze	Chang Yani	Diving	Women's 3 m springboard	9 August
Bronze	Song Jiayuan	Athletics	Women's shot put	9 August
Bronze	Hong Kexin	Wrestling	Women's freestyle 57 kg	9 August
Bronze	Liu Qingyi	Breaking	B-Girls	9 August
Bronze	Lin Xiyu	Golf	Women's individual	10 August

Medals by sport
Sport	1st place, gold medalist(s)	2nd place, silver medalist(s)	3rd place, bronze medalist(s)	Total
Diving	8	2	1	11
Shooting	5	2	3	10
Table tennis	5	1	0	6
Weightlifting	5	0	0	5
Gymnastics	3	6	3	12
Boxing	3	2	0	5
Swimming	2	3	7	12
Badminton	2	3	0	5
Artistic swimming	2	0	0	2
Canoeing	2	0	0	2
Athletics	1	1	2	4
Tennis	1	1	0	2
Cycling	1	0	0	1
Sport climbing	0	2	0	2
Wrestling	0	1	4	5
Taekwondo	0	1	1	2
Archery	0	1	0	1
Field hockey	0	1	0	1
Breaking	0	0	1	1
Golf	0	0	1	1
Judo	0	0	1	1
Total	40	27	24	91

Medals by date
Day	Date	1st place, gold medalist(s)	2nd place, silver medalist(s)	3rd place, bronze medalist(s)	Total
1	27 July	2	0	1	3
2	28 July	1	1	1	3
3	29 July	2	4	0	6
4	30 July	1	1	0	2
5	31 July	3	1	1	5
6	1 August	2	0	3	5
7	2 August	2	2	3	7
8	3 August	3	3	0	6
9	4 August	3	3	2	8
10	5 August	2	3	3	8
11	6 August	1	3	2	6
12	7 August	3	2	1	6
13	8 August	4	2	2	8
14	9 August	4	2	4	10
15	10 August	6	0	1	7
16	11 August	1	0	0	1
Total		40	27	24	91

Medals by gender
Gender	1st place, gold medalist(s)	2nd place, silver medalist(s)	3rd place, bronze medalist(s)	Total	Percentage
Female	20	15	16	51	56.0%
Male	17	10	7	34	37.4%
Mixed	3	2	1	6	6.6%
Total	40	27	24	91	100%

Multiple medalists
Name	Sport	1st place, gold medalist(s)	2nd place, silver medalist(s)	3rd place, bronze medalist(s)	Total
Zhang Yufei	Swimming	0	1	5	6
Yang Junxuan	Swimming	0	1	3	4
Pan Zhanle	Swimming	2	1	0	3
Sun Yingsha	Table tennis	2	1	0	3
Xu Jiayu	Swimming	1	2	0	3
Zou Jingyuan	Gymnastics	1	2	0	3
Tang Qianting	Swimming	0	2	1	3
Zhang Boheng	Gymnastics	0	2	1	3
Sheng Lihao	Shooting	2	0	0	2
Quan Hongchan	Diving	2	0	0	2
Chen Yiwen	Diving	2	0	0	2
Fan Zhendong	Table tennis	2	0	0	2
Wang Chuqin	Table tennis	2	0	0	2
Chen Meng	Table tennis	2	0	0	2
Wang Liuyi	Artistic swimming	2	0	0	2
Wang Qianyi	Artistic swimming	2	0	0	2
Huang Yuting	Shooting	1	1	0	2
Qin Haiyang	Swimming	1	1	0	2
Liu Yang	Gymnastics	1	1	0	2
Chen Yuxi	Diving	1	1	0	2
Wang Zongyuan	Diving	1	1	0	2
Chang Yani	Diving	1	0	1	2
Xiao Ruoteng	Gymnastics	0	1	1	2
Yu Yiting	Swimming	0	0	2	2
Wu Qingfeng	Swimming	0	0	2	2

^{a} Athletes who participated in the heats only.

== Competitors ==
The following is the list of number of competitors in the Games. China has announced the number of swimming and diving's competitors in 6/18/2024.

Sport	Men	Women	Total
Archery	3	3	6
Artistic swimming	0	8	8
Athletics	27	27	54
Badminton	8	8	16
Basketball	4	16	20
Boxing	2	6	8
Breaking	1	2	3
Canoeing	7	11	18
Cycling	5	8	13
Diving	6	4	10
Equestrian	2	0	2
Fencing	5	7	12
Field hockey	0	16	16
Golf	2	2	4
Gymnastics	7	13	20
Judo	0	6	6
Modern pentathlon	2	1	3
Rowing	2	12	14
Rugby sevens	0	12	12
Sailing	6	7	13
Shooting	10	11	21
Skateboarding	0	4	4
Sport climbing	3	4	7
Surfing	0	1	1
Swimming	13	19	32
Table tennis	3	3	6
Taekwondo	2	4	6
Tennis	1	6	7
Triathlon	0	1	1
Volleyball	0	14	14
Water polo	0	13	13
Weightlifting	3	3	6
Wrestling	7	5	12
Total	131	257	388

== Archery ==
China fielded a full squad archers, each to compete in their respective gender events in the individual recurve and team recurve. All of them qualified for the games by virtue of their result at the 2022 Asian Games in Hangzhou; 2024 Final Team Qualification Tournament in Antalya, Turkey; and through the world ranking.

Men

Athlete	Event	Ranking round		Round of 64	Round of 32	Round of 16	Quarterfinals	Semifinals	Final / BM	
Athlete	Event	Score	Seed	Opposition Score	Opposition Score	Opposition Score	Opposition Score	Opposition Score	Opposition Score	Rank
Kao Wenchao	Individual	665	26	Jadhav (IND); W 6–0	Ellison (USA); L 2–6	Did not advance				
Li Zhongyuan	Individual	658	38	Wise (GBR); L 4–6	Did not advance					
Wang Yan	Individual	675	12	Ticas (ESA); W 6–0	Franco (CUB); W 6–2	Lee W-s (KOR); L 2–6	Did not advance			
Kao Wenchao; Li Zhongyuan; Wang Yan	Team	1998	4	—N/a		Bye	Chinese Taipei; W 5–1	South Korea; L 1–5	Turkey; L 2–6	4

Women

Athlete	Event	Ranking round		Round of 64	Round of 32	Round of 16	Quarterfinals	Semifinals	Final / BM	
Athlete	Event	Score	Seed	Opposition Score	Opposition Score	Opposition Score	Opposition Score	Opposition Score	Opposition Score	Rank
An Qixuan	Individual	656	26	Ramazanova (AZE); L 5–6	Did not advance					
Li Jiaman	Individual	667	9	Andersen (DEN); W 6–0	Pitman (GBR); W 6–0	Valencia (MEX); L 5–6	Did not advance			
Yang Xiaolei	Individual	673	3	Elwalid (TUN); W 7–3	Barbelin (FRA); L 2–6	Did not advance				
An Qixuan; Li Jiaman; Yang Xiaolei	Team	1996	2	—N/a		Bye	Indonesia; W 5–1	Mexico; W 5–3	South Korea; L 4–5	2nd place, silver medalist(s)

Mixed

Athlete	Event	Ranking round		Round of 16	Quarterfinals	Semifinals	Final / BM	
Athlete	Event	Score	Seed	Opposition Score	Opposition Score	Opposition Score	Opposition Score	Rank
Wang Yan; Yang Xiaolei	Team	1348	4 Q	Spain; L 2–6	Did not advance			

== Artistic swimming ==
China fielded a squad of eight artistic swimmers to compete in the women's duet and team events by winning the gold medal at the 2022 Asian Games in Hangzhou, China.

Athlete	Event	Technical routine		Free routine			Acrobatic Routine		
Athlete	Event	Points	Rank	Points	Total (technical + free)	Rank	Points	Total (technical + free + acrobatic)	Rank
Wang Liuyi; Wang Qianyi	Duet	276.7867	1	289.6916	566.4783	1st place, gold medalist(s)	—N/a		
Chang Hao; Feng Yu; Wang Ciyue; Wang Liuyi; Wang Qianyi; Xiang Binxuan; Xiao Yanning; Zhang Yayi	Team	313.5538	1	398.8917	712.4455	1	283.6934	996.1389	1st place, gold medalist(s)

== Athletics ==
Chinese track and field athletes achieved the entry standards for Paris 2024, either by passing the direct qualifying mark (or time for track and road races) or by world ranking, in the following events (a maximum of 3 athletes each):

Key

- Note–Ranks given for track events are within the athlete's heat only
- Q = Qualified for the next round
- q = Qualified for the next round as a fastest loser or, in field events, by position without achieving the qualifying target
- NR = National record
- N/A = Round not applicable for the event
- Bye = Athlete not required to compete in round

Track and road events
Men

Athlete	Event	Preliminary		Heat		Repechage		Semifinal		Final	
Athlete	Event	Time	Rank	Time	Rank	Time	Rank	Time	Rank	Time	Rank
Xie Zhenye	100 m	Bye		10.16	4	—N/a		Did not advance			
Xu Zhuoyi	110 m hurdles	—N/a		13.40	1 Q	Bye		13.48	7	Did not advance	
Liu Junxi	110 m hurdles	—N/a		13.54	6 Q	13.52	3	Did not advance			
Qin Weibo	110 m hurdles	—N/a		13.64	6 Q	13.44	1 Q	13.41	6	Did not advance	
Xie Zhiyu	400 m hurdles	—N/a		49.90	8 Q	49.59	4	Did not advance			
He Jie	Marathon	—N/a								2:22:31	67
Yang Shaohui	Marathon	—N/a								2:14:48	55
Wu Xiangdong	Marathon	—N/a								2:12:34	40
Zhang Jun	20 km walk	—N/a								1:19:56	10
Li Yandong	20 km walk	—N/a								1:22:46	31
Wang Zhaozhao	20 km walk	—N/a								1:23:40	36
Xie Zhenye; Yan Haibin; Chen Jiapeng; Deng Zhijian	4 × 100 m relay	—N/a		38.24	1 Q	—N/a				38.06	7

Women

Athlete	Event	Preliminary		Heat		Repechage		Semifinal		Final	
Athlete	Event	Time	Rank	Time	Rank	Time	Rank	Time	Rank	Time	Rank
Ge Manqi	100 m	Bye		11.45	6	—N/a		Did not advance			
Li Yuting	200 m	—N/a		23.31	7 Q	23.24	3	Did not advance			
Wu Yanni	100 m hurdles	—N/a		12.97	6 Q	12.98	4	Did not advance			
Lin Yuwei	100 m hurdles	—N/a		13.24	7 Q	13.13	6	Did not advance			
Mo Jiadie	400 m hurdles	—N/a		55.43	6 Q	54.75	1 Q	55.63	9	Did not advance	
Xu Shuangshuang	3000 m steeplechase	—N/a		9:43.50	12	—N/a				Did not advance	
Bai Li	Marathon	—N/a								2:44:44	76
Xia Yuyu	Marathon	—N/a								2:42:10	72
Zhang Deshun	Marathon	—N/a								2:36:47	59
Liu Hong	20 km walk	—N/a								1:31:24	21
Ma Zhenxia	20 km walk	—N/a								1:29:15	11
Yang Jiayu	20 km walk	—N/a								1:25:54	1st place, gold medalist(s)

Mixed

Athlete	Event	Final	
Athlete	Event	Time	Rank
Zhang Jun; Yang Jiayu	Marathon race walking relay	3:00:43	15
He Xianghong; Qieyang Shijie	Marathon race walking relay	2:59:13	14

Field events
Men

Athlete	Event	Qualification		Final	
Athlete	Event	Distance	Position	Distance	Position
Wang Zhen	High jump	2.20	=19	Did not advance	
Huang Bokai	Pole vault	5.75	9 q	5.80	7
Zhong Tao	Pole vault	5.40	26=	Did not advance	
Yao Jie	Pole vault	5.60	20=	Did not advance	
Wang Jianan	Long jump	8.12	3 q	8.03	8
Zhang Mingkun	Long jump	7.92	9 q	8.07	7
Shi Yuhao	Long jump	7.68	24	Did not advance	
Fang Yaoqing	Triple jump	15.85	31	Did not advance	
Zhu Yaming	Triple jump	16.91	8 q	16.76	10
Su Wen	Triple jump	16.70	16	Did not advance	
Wang Qi	Hammer throw	72.52	19	Did not advance	

Women

Athlete	Event	Qualification		Final	
Athlete	Event	Result	Rank	Result	Rank
Niu Chunge	Pole vault	4.40	=22	Did not advance	
Xiong Shiqi	Long jump	6.58	13	Did not advance	
Zeng Rui	Triple jump	13.69	24	Did not advance	
Gong Lijiao	Shot put	18.78	5 q	19.27	5
Song Jiayuan	Shot put	18.73	6 q	19.32	3rd place, bronze medalist(s)
Sun Yue	Shot put	17.33	21	Did not advance	
Feng Bin	Discus throw	65.40	3 Q	67.51	2nd place, silver medalist(s)
Jiang Zhichao	Discus throw	59.10	28	Did not advance	
Wang Zheng	Hammer throw	66.92	28	Did not advance	
Zhao Jie	Hammer throw	72.49	7 q	74.27	3rd place, bronze medalist(s)
Li Jiangyan	Hammer throw	70.54	13	Did not advance	
Lü Huihui	Javelin throw	59.37	22	Did not advance	
Dai Qianqian	Javelin throw	59.33	23	Did not advance	

== Badminton ==
China entered a full squad of badminton players into the Olympic tournament based on the BWF Race to Paris Rankings.

Men

Athlete	Event	Group stage					Elimination	Quarter-final	Semi-final	Final / BM	
Athlete	Event	Opposition Score	Opposition Score	Opposition Score	Opposition Score	Rank	Opposition Score	Opposition Score	Opposition Score	Opposition Score	Rank
Shi Yuqi	Singles	Opti (SUR); W (21–5, 21–7)	Toti (ITA); W (21–9, 21–10)	—N/a		1 Q	Bye	Vitidsarn (THA); L (12–21, 10–21)	Did not advance		8
Li Shifeng	Singles	Künzi (SUI); W (21–13, 21–13)	Opeyori (NGR); W (21–17, 21–17)	—N/a		1 Q	Loh (SGP); L (21–23, 15–21)	Did not advance			
Liang Weikeng; Wang Chang	Doubles	Dong / Yakura (CAN); W (21–5, 21–12)	Lane / Vendy (GBR); W (21–18, 13–21, 21–14)	Chia / Soh W Y (MAS); W (24–22, 21–14)	—N/a	1 Q	—N/a	Alfian (INA) / Ardianto (INA); W (24–22, 22–20)	Chia / Soh W Y (MAS); W (21–19, 15–21, 21–17)	Lee Y / Wang C-l (TPE); L (17–21, 21–18, 19–21)	2nd place, silver medalist(s)
Liu Yuchen; Ou Xuanyi	Doubles	Chiu / Yuan (USA); W (21–13, 21–14)	Astrup / Rasmussen (DEN); L (15–21, 13–21)	Hoki / Kobayashi (JPN); W (22–20, 21–18)	Lee Y / Wang C-l (TPE); L (21–17, 17–21, 22–24)	3	—N/a	Did not advance			

Women

Athlete	Event	Group stage				Elimination	Quarter-final	Semi-final	Final / BM	
Athlete	Event	Opposition Score	Opposition Score	Opposition Score	Rank	Opposition Score	Opposition Score	Opposition Score	Opposition Score	Rank
Chen Yufei	Singles	Li (GER); W (21–14, 17–21, 21–9)	Blichfeldt (DEN); W (21–8, 19–21, 21–11)	—N/a	1 Q	Bye	He (CHN); L (16–21, 17–21)	Did not advance		
He Bingjiao	Singles	Az Zahra (AZE); W (21–8, 21–7)	Gilmour (GBR); W (24–22, 21–8)	—N/a	1 Q	Sindhu (IND); W (21–19, 21–14)	Chen (CHN); W (21–16, 21–17)	Marín (ESP); W (14–21, 8–10) RET	An S-y (KOR); L (13–21, 16–21)	2nd place, silver medalist(s)
Chen Qingchen; Jia Yifan	Doubles	Tan / Muralitharan (MAS); W (21–17, 22–20)	Rahayu / Ramadhanti (INA); W (21–12, 24–22)	Matsumoto / Nagahara (JPN); W (21–16, 21–15)	1 Q	—N/a	Stoeva / Stoeva (BUL); W (21–15, 21–8)	Tan / Thinaah (MAS); W (21–12, 18–21, 21–15)	Liu / Tan (CHN); W (22–20, 21–15)	1st place, gold medalist(s)
Liu Shengshu; Tan Ning	Doubles	A Xu / K Xu (USA); W (21–11, 21–14)	Stoeva / Stoeva (BUL); W (19–21, 21–10, 21–16)	Yeung NT / Yeung PL (HKG); W (21–18, 21–15)	1 Q	—N/a	Baek H-n / Lee S-h (KOR); W (21–9, 21–13)	Matsuyama / Shida (JPN); W (21–16, 21–19)	Chen / Jia (CHN); L (20–22, 15–21)	2nd place, silver medalist(s)

Mixed

Athlete	Event	Group stage				Quarter-final	Semi-final	Final / BM	
Athlete	Event	Opposition Score	Opposition Score	Opposition Score	Rank	Opposition Score	Opposition Score	Opposition Score	Rank
Zheng Siwei; Huang Yaqiong	Doubles	Gicquel / Delrue (FRA); W (21–14, 23–21)	Rivaldy / Mentari (INA); W (21–10, 21–3)	Kim W-h / Jeong N-e (KOR); W (21–13, 21–14)	1 Q	Feng / Huang Dp (CHN); W (21–16, 21–15)	Watanabe / Higashino (JPN); W (21–14, 21–15)	Kim W-h / Jeong N-e (KOR); W (21–8, 21–11)	1st place, gold medalist(s)
Feng Yanzhe; Huang Dongping	Doubles	Chiu / Gai (USA); W (21–11, 21–14)	Hee / Tan (SGP); W (21–13, 21–17)	Chen TJ / Toh EW (MAS); L (21–17, 15–21, 16–21)	2 Q	Zheng / Huang Yq (CHN); L (16–21, 15–21)	Did not advance		

== Basketball ==
=== 5×5 basketball ===
Summary

Team	Event	Group stage				Quarterfinal	Semifinal	Final / BM	
Team	Event	Opposition Score	Opposition Score	Opposition Score	Rank	Opposition Score	Opposition Score	Opposition Score	Rank
China women's	Women's tournament	Spain; L 89–90	Serbia; L 59–81	Puerto Rico; W 80–58	3	Did not advance			9

==== Women's tournament ====
The China women's national basketball team qualified for the Olympics by finishing in the top two at the 2024 Olympic Qualifying Tournaments in Xi'an.

Team roster

A 16-player roster was announced on 26 June 2024. The final squad was revealed on 13 July 2024.

China women's national basketball team – 2024 Summer Olympics roster
Players
Coaches

Pos.	No.	Name	Age – Date of birth	Height	Club	Ctr.
G	4	Li Yuan	24 – 29 May 2000	1.70 m (5 ft 7 in)	Shandong Six Stars	(China)
G	5	Wang Siyu	28 – 16 October 1995	1.80 m (5 ft 11 in)	Shandong Six Stars	(China)
G	6	Wu Tongtong	30 – 27 June 1994	1.75 m (5 ft 9 in)	Shanxi Flame	(China)
PG	7	Yang Liwei (C)	29 – 2 January 1995	1.76 m (5 ft 9 in)	Guangdong Vermilion Birds	(China)
F	8	Yang Shuyu	22 – 6 March 2002	1.80 m (5 ft 11 in)	Guangdong Vermilion Birds	(China)
SG	9	Li Meng	29 – 2 January 1995	1.83 m (6 ft 0 in)	Liaoning Flying Eagles	(China)
F	10	Zhang Ru	24 – 2 September 1999	1.85 m (6 ft 1 in)	Henan Phoenix	(China)
PF	11	Huang Sijing	28 – 8 January 1996	1.90 m (6 ft 3 in)	Guangdong Vermilion Birds	(China)
F	12	Luo Xinyu	22 – 22 November 2001	1.88 m (6 ft 2 in)	Jiangsu Phoenix	(China)
C	13	Sun Mengran	32 – 16 July 1992	1.97 m (6 ft 6 in)	Shandong Six Stars	(China)
C	14	Li Yueru	25 – 28 March 1999	2.00 m (6 ft 7 in)	Beşiktaş	(Turkey)
C	15	Han Xu	24 – 31 October 1999	2.05 m (6 ft 9 in)	Xinjiang Magic Deer	(China)

Head coach

- (China) Zheng Wei

Assistant coach(es)

- (Spain) César Rupérez

Legend

- (C) Team captain
- Club – describes last
  club before the tournament
- Age – describes age
  on 28 July 2024

Group play

Pos	Team	Pld	W	L	PF	PA	PD	Pts	Qualification
1	Spain	3	3	0	223	213	+10	6	Quarterfinals
2	Serbia	3	2	1	201	184	+17	5	Quarterfinals
3	China	3	1	2	228	229	−1	4	
4	Puerto Rico	3	0	3	175	201	−26	3	

Source: FIBA
Rules for classification: 1) classification points; 2) head-to-head results; 3) head-to-head game points difference; 4) head-to-head number of game points scored.

28 July 2024
13:30

Report

Spain	90–89 (OT)	China
Scoring by quarter: 13–22, 20–15, 20–22, 23–17, Overtime: 14–13
Pts: Gustafson 29; Rebs: Gustafson 8 Asts: Casas 8		Pts: Li Y. 31; Rebs: Li Y. 15; Asts: Li M. 11

Stade Pierre-Mauroy, Lille
Attendance: 27,021
Referees: Viola Györgyi (NOR), Maripier Malo (CAN), Péter Praksch (HUN)

31 July 2024
13:30

Report

China	59–81	Serbia
Scoring by quarter: 17–23, 22–22, 11–17, 9–19
Pts: Han, Wang 11; Rebs: Li Yue. 11; Asts: Wang, Yang L. 5		Pts: Anderson 15; Rebs: Krajišnik 11; Asts: Anderson 6

Stade Pierre-Mauroy, Lille
Attendance: 23,942
Referees: Martin Vulić (CRO), Maj Forsberg (DEN), James Boyer (AUS)

3 August 2024
11:00

Report

China	80–58	Puerto Rico
Scoring by quarter: 17–11, 23–18, 22–16, 18–13
Pts: Li M. 18; Rebs: Han 9 Asts: Li M. 7		Pts: Guirantes 20; Rebs: Hollingshed 8 Asts: Rosado 5

Stade Pierre-Mauroy, Lille
Attendance: 26,595
Referees: Omar Bermúdez (MEX), Rabah Noujaim (LBN), Maripier Malo (CAN)

=== 3×3 basketball ===
Summary

Team	Event	Group stage								Play-ins	Semifinal	Final / BM	
Team	Event	Opposition Score	Opposition Score	Opposition Score	Opposition Score	Opposition Score	Opposition Score	Opposition Score	Rank	Opposition Score	Opposition Score	Opposition Score	Rank
China men's	Men's tournament	Netherlands; L 16–21	Serbia; W 21–15	Latvia; L 8–22	Poland; L 17–22	Lithuania; L 16–21	United States; L 17–21	France; L 12–21	8	Did not advance			
China women's	Women's tournament	France; W 21–19	Canada; L 11–21	Australia; L 15–21	Spain; W 14–11	Germany; L 15–18	Azerbaijan; L 19–21	United States; L 12–14	6 Q	United States; L 13–21	Did not advance		

==== Men's tournament ====
The Chinese men's 3x3 team qualified for the Olympics as one of the three best ranked teams in the world ranking.

Team roster

The roster was announced on 13 July.

- Lu Wenbo
- Zhang Ning
- Zhao Jiaren
- Zhu Yuanbo

Group play

Pos	Team	Pld	W	L	PF	PA	PD	Qualification
1	Latvia	7	7	0	147	103	+44	Semifinals
2	Netherlands	7	5	2	133	112	+21	Semifinals
3	Lithuania	7	4 (Note: Lithuania 20–18 Serbia)	3	134	125	+9	Play-ins
4	Serbia	7	4	3	129	123	+6	Play-ins
5	France (H)	7	3	4	131	132	−1	Play-ins
6	Poland	7	2 (Note: United States 17–19 Poland)	5	116	139	−23	Play-ins
7	United States	7	2	5	116	138	−22	
8	China	7	1	6	107	141	−34	

Source: FIBA
Rules for classification: 1) Wins; 2) Head-to-head record; 3) Points scored.
(H) Hosts
Notes:

30 July 2024
19:05
v

Boxscore

China	16–21	Netherlands
Pts: Zhang 7		Pts: De Jong 9

Place de la Concorde, Paris
Referees: Markos Michaelides (SUI), Najib Chajiddine (FRA)

31 July 2024
19:05
v

Boxscore

Serbia	15–21	China
Pts: Majstorović 7		Pts: Zhang 11

Place de la Concorde, Paris
Referees: Markos Michaelides (SUI), Dorothy Okatch (BOT)

1 August 2024
10:35
v

Boxscore

China	8–22	Latvia
Pts: Zhang 6		Pts: Lācis 8

Place de la Concorde, Paris
Referees: Deanna Jackson (USA), Jasmina Juras (SRB)

1 August 2024
19:35
v

Boxscore

China	17–22	Poland
Pts: Zhang 9		Pts: Zamojski 9

Place de la Concorde, Paris
Referees: Najib Chajiddine (FRA), Vlad Ghizdareanu (ROU)

2 August 2024
10:05
v

Boxscore

Lithuania	21–16	China
Pts: Džiaugys 9		Pts: Zhao 6

Place de la Concorde, Paris
Referees: Marek Maliszewski (POL), Brigitta Csabai-Kaskötő (HUN)

2 August 2024
22:35
v

Boxscore

China	17–21	United States
Pts: Zhao 9		Pts: Barry 14

Place de la Concorde, Paris
Referees: Kim Ga-in (KOR), Vlad Ghizdareanu (ROU)

4 August 2024
17:30
v

Boxscore

France	21–12	China
Pts: Dussoulier, Rambaut 6		Pts: Zhang 4

Place de la Concorde, Paris
Referees: Jasmina Juras (SRB), Vlad Ghizdareanu (ROU)

==== Women's tournament ====
The Chinese women's 3x3 team qualified for the Olympics as one of the three best ranked teams in the world ranking.

Team roster

The roster was named on 11 July.

- Chen Mingling
- Wan Jiyuan
- Wang Lili
- Zhang Zhiting

Group play

Pos	Team	Pld	W	L	PF	PA	PD	Qualification
1	Germany	7	6	1	117	100	+17	Semifinals
2	Spain	7	4 (Note: Spain 2–1; United States 2–1; Canada 1–2; Australia 1–2. Sorted by points scored after first tie broken.)	3	115	114	+1	Semifinals
3	United States	7	4	3	108	109	−1	Play-ins
4	Canada	7	4	3	129	112	+17	Play-ins
5	Australia	7	4	3	127	122	+5	Play-ins
6	China	7	2 (Note: China 1–1; France 1–1; Azerbaijan 1–1. Sorted by points scored.)	5	107	123	−16	Play-ins
7	Azerbaijan	7	2	5	106	123	−17	
8	France (H)	7	2	5	99	105	−6	

Source: FIBA
Rules for classification: 1) Wins; 2) Head-to-head record; 3) Points scored.
(H) Hosts
Notes:

30 July 2024
21:30

Boxscore

France	19–21	China
Pts: Limouzin 6		Pts: Chen 10

Place de la Concorde, Paris
Referees: Deanna Jackson (USA), Brigitta Csabai-Kaskötő (HUN)

31 July 2024
18:00

Boxscore

Canada	21–11	China
Pts: Crozon, M. Plouffe 7		Pts: Chen 5

Place de la Concorde, Paris
Referees: Deanna Jackson (USA), Najib Chajiddine (FRA)

1 August 2024
09:00

Boxscore

China	15–21	Australia
Pts: Wang 5		Pts: Wilson 11

Place de la Concorde, Paris
Referees: Deanna Jackson (USA), Brigitta Csabai-Kaskötő (HUN)

1 August 2024
18:00

Boxscore

China	14–11	Spain
Pts: Wang 5		Pts: Camilión 7

Place de la Concorde, Paris
Referees: Vlad Ghizdareanu (ROU), Marek Maliszewski (POL)

2 August 2024
09:00

Boxscore

China	15–18	Germany
Pts: Chen 6		Pts: Reichert 7

Place de la Concorde, Paris
Referees: Marek Maliszewski (POL), Dorothy Okatch (BOT)

2 August 2024
17:30

Boxscore

Azerbaijan	21–19 (OT)	China
Pts: Hayes 11		Pts: Chen 8

Place de la Concorde, Paris
Referees: Markos Michaelides (SUI), Kim Ga-in (KOR)

3 August 2024
19:05

Boxscore

China	12–14	United States
Pts: Wan, Zhang 4		Pts: Van Lith 6

Place de la Concorde, Paris
Referees: Markos Michaelides (SUI), Vlad Ghizdareanu (ROU)

Play-in

3 August 2024
22:05

Boxscore

United States	21–13	China
Pts: Hamby 9		Pts: Chen, Wan 4

Place de la Concorde, Paris
Referees: Markos Michaelides (SUI), Kim Ga-in (KOR)

== Boxing ==
China entered eight boxers into the Olympic tournament. Seven of them qualified to Paris by advancing to the semifinals and finals at the 2022 Asian Games in Hangzhou, China. Xu Zichun (women's featherweight) secured her spot following the triumph in quota bouts round, at the 2024 World Olympic Qualification Tournament 2 in Bangkok, Thailand.

Athlete	Event	Round of 32	Round of 16	Quarterfinals	Semifinals	Final	
Athlete	Event	Opposition Result	Opposition Result	Opposition Result	Opposition Result	Opposition Result	Rank
Toqtarbek Tanatqan	Men's 80 kg	Bye	Pinales (DOM); L 0–5	Did not advance			
Han Xuezhen	Men's 92 kg	—N/a	Reyes Pla (ESP); L 1–4	Did not advance			
Wu Yu	Women's 50 kg	Bye	Zareen (IND); W 5–0	Raksat (THA); W 5–0	Kyzaibay (KAZ); W 4–1	Çakıroğlu (TUR); W 4–1	1st place, gold medalist(s)
Chang Yuan	Women's 54 kg	Bye	Lehane (IRL); W 5–0	Petrova (BUL); W 4–1	Pang C-m (PRK); W 3–2	Akbaş (TUR); W 5–0	1st place, gold medalist(s)
Xu Zichun	Women's 57 kg	Testa (ITA); W 3–2	Arboleda (COL); W 3–2	Petecio (PHI); L 0–5	Did not advance		
Yang Wenlu	Women's 60 kg	Bye	Hà T L (VIE); W 5–0	Shadrina (SRB); W 3–2	Wu S-y (TPE); W 5–0	Harrington (IRL); L 1–4	2nd place, silver medalist(s)
Yang Liu	Women's 66 kg	Bye	Panguana (MOZ); W 5–0	Derieuw (BEL); W 5–0	Chen N-c (TPE); W 4–1	Khelif (ALG); L 0–5	2nd place, silver medalist(s)
Li Qian	Women's 75 kg	—N/a	Bacyadan (PHI); W 5–0	Borgohain (IND); W 4–1	Parker (AUS); W 5–0	Bylon (PAN); W 4–1	1st place, gold medalist(s)

== Breaking ==
China entered three breakdancers to compete in the B-Boy and B-Girl dual battles for Paris 2024. Liu Qingyi (671) qualified for the games after she won the gold medal at the 2022 Asian Games in Hangzhou, China. Later on, Qi Xiangyu (Lithe-ing) and Zeng Yingying (Yingzi) outlasted from 2024 Olympic Qualifier Series in Shanghai, China and Budapest, Hungary.

Athlete	Nickname	Event	Round-robin		Quarterfinal	Semifinal	Final / BM	
Athlete	Nickname	Event	Votes	Rank	Opposition Result	Opposition Result	Opposition Result	Rank
Qi Xiangyu	Lithe-ing	B-Boys	27	3	Did not advance			10
Liu Qingyi	671	B-Girls	33	2 Q	Kate (UKR); W (6–3, 5–4, 9–0)	Nicka (LTU); L (2–7, 5–4, 2–7)	India (NED); W (6–3, 9–0, 4–5)	3rd place, bronze medalist(s)
Zeng Yingying	Yingzi	B-Girls	35	2 Q	Nicka (LTU); L (2–7, 5–4, 2–7)	Did not advance		8

== Canoeing ==
=== Slalom ===
China entered one single boat into the slalom competition, for the Games through the 2023 ICF Canoe Slalom World Championships in London, Great Britain. They also qualified a boat in the women's C-1 class of their result in the 2023 Asian Canoe Slalom Olympic Qualifiers. All slalom canoeists will also be eligible for the extreme kayak/kayak cross event.

Athlete	Event	Preliminary						Semifinal		Final	
Athlete	Event	Run 1	Rank	Run 2	Rank	Best	Rank	Time	Rank	Time	Rank
Quan Xin	Men's K-1	87.23	7	89.80	10	87.23	11 Q	95.95	11 Q	94.75	11
Huang Juan	Women's C-1	112.88	15	108.47	11	108.47	14 Q	121.64	15	Did not advance	
Li Shiting	Women's K-1	110.39	23	101.63	20	101.63	20 Q	111.04	16	Did not advance	

=== Kayak cross ===
Athlete	Event	Time trial		Round 1	Repechage	Heats	Quarterfinals	Semifinals	Final	
Athlete	Event	Time	Rank	Position	Position	Position	Position	Position	Position	Rank
Quan Xin	Men's KX-1	69.13	13 Q	1 Q	Bye	4	Did not advance			26
Li Shiting	Women's KX-1	77.40	25 Q	3 R	3	Did not advance				34

=== Sprint ===
Chinese canoeists qualified four boats in each of the following distances for the Games through the 2023 ICF Canoe Sprint World Championships in Duisburg, Germany; and 2024 Asian Olympic in Tokyo, Japan.

Men

Athlete	Event	Heats		Quarterfinals		Semifinals		Final	
Athlete	Event	Time	Rank	Time	Rank	Time	Rank	Time	Rank
Zhang Dong	Men's K-1 1000 m	3:35.83	4 QF	3:37.75	4	Did not advance			
Bu Tingkai; Zhang Dong	Men's K-2 500 m	1:36.79	4 QF	1:29.58	5	Did not advance			
Bu Tingkai; Wang Congkang; Zhang Dong; Dong Yi	Men's K-4 500 m	1:25.00	5 QF	1:21.31	7	Did not advance			
Ji Bowen	Men's C-1 1000 m	4:02.85	5 QF	3:56.36	2 SF	3:46.48	7 FB	3:58.13	15
Liu Hao	Men's C-1 1000 m	3:45.85	2 SF	Bye		4:01.95	7 FB	3:52.25	13
Liu Hao; Ji Bowen	Men's C-2 500 m	1:37.40	1 SF	Bye		1:40.83	1 FA	1:39.48	1st place, gold medalist(s)

Women

Athlete	Event	Heats		Quarterfinals		Semifinals		Final	
Athlete	Event	Time	Rank	Time	Rank	Time	Rank	Time	Rank
Wang Nan	Women's K-1 500 m	1:51.28	1 SF	Bye		1:50.96	2 FA	1:50.89	5
Yin Mengdie	Women's K-1 500 m	1:52.29	4 QF	1:49.74	2 SF	1:50.52	4 FB	1:53.25	13
Yu Shimeng; Chen Yule	Women's K-2 500 m	1:42.70	2 SF	Bye		1:44.45	8 FB	1:46.26	14
Li Dongyin; Yin Mengdie; Wang Nan; Sun Yuewen	Women's K-4 500 m	1:33.64	3 FA	—N/a		Bye		1:33.57	5
Lin Wenjun	Women's C-1 200 m	46.84	3 QF	48.13	2 SF	45.70	4 FA	45.23	7
Xu Shixiao; Sun Mengya	Women's C-2 500 m	1:54.45	1 SF	Bye		1:53.73	1 FA	1:52.81	1st place, gold medalist(s)

Qualification Legend: FA = Qualify to final (medal); FB = Qualify to final B (non-medal); R = Qualify to repechage

== Cycling ==
=== Road ===
China entered two riders to compete in the respective events. China obtained all of those quota by virtue of the establishment of the UCI World Rankings.

Athlete	Event	Time	Rank
Lü Xianjing	Men's road race	6:39:27	68
Tang Xin	Women's road race	DNF	
Tang Xin	Women's time trial	45:59.44	32

=== Track ===
Chinese riders obtained a full spots for men's and women's individual sprint, team sprint, keirin and omnium events, based on their country's results in the final UCI Olympic rankings.

Sprint

Athlete	Event	Qualification		Round 1	Repechage 1	Round 2	Repechage 2	Round 3	Repechage 3	Quarterfinals	Semifinals	Finals / BM	
Athlete	Event	Time Speed (km/h)	Rank	Opposition Time Speed (km/h)	Opposition Time Speed (km/h)	Opposition Time Speed (km/h)	Opposition Time Speed (km/h)	Opposition Time Speed (km/h)	Opposition Time Speed (km/h)	Opposition Time Speed (km/h)	Opposition Time Speed (km/h)	Opposition Time Speed (km/h)	Rank
Zhou Yu	Men's sprint	9.514; 75.678	18 Q	Turnbull (GBR); L	Tjon En Fa (SUR); Spiegel (GER); L	Did not advance							
Liu Qi	Men's sprint	9.904; 72.698	28	Did not advance									
Bao Shanju	Women's sprint	10.744; 67.014	22 Q	Andrews (NZL); L	van der Peet (NED); Verdugo (MEX); L	Did not advance							
Yuan Liying	Women's sprint	DNS		Did not advance									

Team sprint

Athlete	Event	Qualification		Semifinals		Final	
Athlete	Event	Time Speed (km/h)	Rank	Opposition Time Speed (km/h)	Rank	Opposition Time Speed (km/h)	Rank
Guo Shuai; Zhou Yu; Liu Qi	Men's team sprint	42.606; 63.371	6 Q	Australia; 42.635; 63.328	2 Q7-8	Canada; 42.532; 63.482	7
Guo Yufang; Bao Shanju; Yuan Liying	Women's team sprint	46.458; 58.117	5 Q	Netherlands; 46.362; 58.237	2 Q5-6	Mexico; 46.572; 57.975	6

Qualification legend: FA=Gold medal final; FB=Bronze medal final

Keirin

Athlete	Event	Round 1	Repechage	Quarterfinals	Semifinals	Final
Athlete	Event	Rank	Rank	Rank	Rank	Rank
Zhou Yu	Men's keirin	4 Q	5	Did not advance		
Liu Qi	Men's keirin	3 Q	3	Did not advance		
Guo Yufang	Women's keirin	2 Q	Bye	5	Did not advance	
Yuan Liying	Women's keirin	2 Q	Bye	5	Did not advance	

Omnium

Athlete	Event	Scratch race		Tempo race		Elimination race		Points race		Total	
Athlete	Event	Rank	Points	Rank	Points	Rank	Points	Rank	Points	Rank	Points
Liu Jiali	Women's omnium	12	18	16	10	16	10	22	0	19	38

=== Mountain biking ===
China mountain bikers secured a men's and women's quota place each in the Olympic cross-country race by winning the gold medal at the 2023 Asian Continental Championships.

Athlete	Event	Time	Rank
Mi Jiujiang	Men's cross-country	–2 LAP	33
Wu Zhifan	Women's cross-country	1:36:07	22

=== BMX ===
Freestyle

Chinese riders received two quota spots in the women's BMX freestyle for the games by virtue of the result at the 2024 Olympic Qualifier Series.

Athlete	Event	Seeding		Final	
Athlete	Event	Points	Rank	Points	Rank
Sun Jiaqi	Women's freestyle	87.83	3 Q	70.80	7
Deng Yawen	Women's freestyle	91.03	2 Q	92.60	1st place, gold medalist(s)

== Diving ==
China fielded full squad of divers in Paris 2024. Four of them dominated both the synchronized springboard and platform events with their successful gold-medal triumphs with the remainder awarded to the Chinese diving team after advancing to the top twelve final each in the men's and women's individual springboard and women's individual platform, respectively, at the 2023 World Aquatics Championships in Fukuoka, Japan.

Men

Athlete	Event	Preliminary		Semifinal		Final	
Athlete	Event	Points	Rank	Points	Rank	Points	Rank
Wang Zongyuan	3 m springboard	530.65	1 Q	537.85	1 Q	530.20	2nd place, silver medalist(s)
Xie Siyi	3 m springboard	509.60	2 Q	505.85	2 Q	543.60	1st place, gold medalist(s)
Cao Yuan	10 m platform	500.15	1 Q	504.00	1 Q	547.50	1st place, gold medalist(s)
Yang Hao	10 m platform	479.80	4 Q	490.55	2 Q	390.20	12
Long Daoyi; Wang Zongyuan	3 m synchronized springboard	—N/a				446.10	1st place, gold medalist(s)
Lian Junjie; Yang Hao	10 m synchronized platform	—N/a				490.35	1st place, gold medalist(s)

Women

Athlete	Event	Preliminary		Semifinal		Final	
Athlete	Event	Points	Rank	Points	Rank	Points	Rank
Chen Yiwen	3 m springboard	356.40	1 Q	360.85	1 Q	376.00	1st place, gold medalist(s)
Chang Yani	3 m springboard	308.75	4 Q	320.15	4 Q	318.75	3rd place, bronze medalist(s)
Chen Yuxi	10 m platform	382.15	2 Q	403.05	2 Q	420.70	2nd place, silver medalist(s)
Quan Hongchan	10 m platform	421.25	1 Q	421.05	1 Q	425.60	1st place, gold medalist(s)
Chang Yani; Chen Yiwen	3 m synchronized springboard	—N/a				337.68	1st place, gold medalist(s)
Chen Yuxi; Quan Hongchan	10 m synchronized platform	—N/a				359.10	1st place, gold medalist(s)

== Equestrian ==
China entered two riders in the individual eventing event, through the establishments of final olympics ranking for Group G (South East Asia, Oceania).

=== Eventing ===
Athlete	Horse	Event	Dressage		Cross-country			Jumping						Total	
Athlete	Horse	Event	Dressage		Cross-country			Qualifier			Final			Total	
Athlete	Horse	Event	Penalties	Rank	Penalties	Total	Rank	Penalties	Total	Rank	Penalties	Total	Rank	Penalties	Rank
Alex Hua Tian	Jilsonne Van Bareelhof	Individual	22.00	3	20.60	42.60	32	1.60	44.20	25 Q	0.00	44.20	23	44.20	23
Sun Huadong	Lady Chin V'T Moerven Z	Individual	33.60	36	Withdrawn										

== Fencing ==
China entered fifteen fencers into the Olympic competition. Yang Hengyu and Wang Zijie secured their quota places, respectively in the women's individual sabre and men's individual épée, after nominated as the highest ranked individual fencers, eligible for Asia & Oceania zone; both men's and women's foil team, also women's épée team qualified for the games after becoming the highest ranked Asia & Oceania team; through the release of the FIE Official ranking for Paris 2024. The nations also secured one additional quota place, through the 2024 Asia and Oceanian Zonal Qualifying Tournament in Dubai, United Arab Emirates.

Men

Athlete	Event	Round of 64	Round of 32	Round of 16	Quarterfinal	Semifinal / Cl.	Final / BM / Pl.	
Athlete	Event	Opposition Score	Opposition Score	Opposition Score	Opposition Score	Opposition Score	Opposition Score	Rank
Wang Zijie	Épée	Bye	Limardo (VEN); W 15–12	Kano (JPN); L 4–15	Did not advance			
Mo Ziwei	Foil	Bye	Toldo (BRA); W 15–7	Cheung (HKG); L 10–15	Did not advance			
Chen Haiwei	Foil	Bye	Meinhardt (USA); L 7–15	Did not advance				
Xu Jie	Foil	Bye	Macchi (ITA); L 10–15	Did not advance				
Mo Ziwei; Chen Haiwei; Xu Jie; Wu Bin*	Team foil	—N/a			France; L 35–45	Classification 5–8; Canada; W 45–32	Classification 5–6; Poland; W 45–30	5
Shen Chenpeng	Sabre	Bye	Gallo (ITA); W 15–6	Park S-w (KOR); W 15–11	Ferjani (TUN); L 14–15	Did not advance		

Women

Athlete	Event	Round of 64	Round of 32	Round of 16	Quarterfinal	Semifinal / Cl.	Final / BM / Pl.	
Athlete	Event	Opposition Score	Opposition Score	Opposition Score	Opposition Score	Opposition Score	Opposition Score	Rank
Sun Yiwen	Épée	Bye	Yoshimura (JPN); L 13–14	Did not advance				
Yu Sihan	Épée	Bye	Lee H-i (KOR); W 15–13	Candassamy (FRA); W 15–10	Muhari (HUN); L 10–15	Did not advance		
Tang Junyao	Épée	Bye	Muhari (HUN); L 10–15	Did not advance				
Sun Yiwen; Yu Sihan; Tang Junyao; Xu Nuo*	Team épée	—N/a			Ukraine; W 45–41	Italy; L 24–45	Poland; L 31–32	4
Chen Qingyuan	Foil	Bye	Zhang (CAN); L 7–15	Did not advance				
Huang Qianqian	Foil	Bye	El-Sharkawy (EGY); W 15–5	Kiefer (USA); L 9–15	Did not advance			
Wang Yuting	Foil	Bye	Harvey (CAN); L 8–12	Did not advance				
Chen Qingyuan; Huang Qianqian; Wang Yuting; Jiao Enqi*	Women's team foil	—N/a			United States; L 37–45	Classification 5–8; France; L 39–45	Classification 7–8; Egypt; W 45–18	7
Yang Hengyu	Sabre	Bye	Bashta (AZE); L 9–15	Did not advance				

== Field hockey ==
Summary

Key:

- FT – After full-time.
- P – Match decided by penalty-shootout.

Team	Event	Group stage						Quarterfinal	Semifinal	Final / GM	
Team	Event	Opposition Score	Opposition Score	Opposition Score	Opposition Score	Opposition Score	Rank	Opposition Score	Opposition Score	Opposition Score	Rank
China women's	Women's tournament	Belgium; L 1–2	Japan; W 5–0	Netherlands; L 0–3	Germany; L 2–4	France; W 7–1	4 Q	Australia; W 3–2	Belgium; W 1–1 (3–2 pso)	Netherlands; L 1–1 (1–3 pso)	2nd place, silver medalist(s)

=== Women's tournament ===
China women's national field hockey team qualified for the Olympics after winning the gold medal at the 2022 Asian Games in Hangzhou, China.

Team roster

Head coach: (Australia) Alyson Annan

No.	Pos.	Player	Date of birth (age)	Caps	Goals	Club
1	GK	Ye Jiao	21 October 1994 (aged 29)	108	0	(China) Sichuan
2	DF	Gu Bingfeng	24 January 1994 (aged 30)	174	107	(China) Liaoning
3	DF	Yang Liu	1 September 1998 (aged 25)	52	1	(China) Sichuan
6	MF	Zhang Ying	29 August 1998 (aged 25)	72	19	(China) Jiangsu
7	FW	Chen Yi	28 January 1997 (aged 27)	62	12	(China) Sichuan
9	MF	Ma Ning	29 September 2000 (aged 23)	73	9	(China) Jilin
13	MF	Li Hong	31 May 1999 (aged 25)	136	17	(China) Tianjin
16	DF	Ou Zixia (Captain)	24 September 1995 (aged 28)	167	14	(China) Sichuan
17	MF	Dan Wen	14 June 1999 (aged 25)	96	8	(China) Sichuan
18	MF	Zou Meirong	1 September 2000 (aged 23)	51	16	(China) Sichuan
20	MF	He Jiangxin	19 August 1997 (aged 26)	102	1	(China) Sichuan
23	MF	Fan Yunxia	7 December 2002 (aged 21)	24	1	(China) Jiangsu
26	MF	Chen Yang	15 February 1997 (aged 27)	116	14	(China) Liaoning
27	MF	Xu Wenyu	6 December 1995 (aged 28)	107	4	(China) Sichuan
31	FW	Zhong Jiaqi	23 September 1999 (aged 24)	119	45	(China) Guangdong
35	DF	Tan Jinzhuang	27 January 2003 (aged 21)	25	1	(China) Sichuan
58	FW	Yu Anhui	30 April 2001 (aged 23)	24		

Group play

Pos	Team	Pld	W	D	L	GF	GA	GD	Pts	Qualification
1	Netherlands	5	5	0	0	19	5	+14	15	Quarter-finals
2	Belgium	5	4	0	1	13	4	+9	12	Quarter-finals
3	Germany	5	3	0	2	12	7	+5	9	Quarter-finals
4	China	5	2	0	3	15	10	+5	6	Quarter-finals
5	Japan	5	1	0	4	2	15	−13	3	
6	France (H)	5	0	0	5	4	24	−20	0	

Source: FIH
Rules for classification: 1) points; 2) matches won; 3) goal difference; 4) goals for; 5) head-to-head result; 6) field goals scored.
(H) Hosts

28 July 2024
10:00
v

Belgium	2–1	China
Ballenghien 23'; Englebert 55'	Report	Chen Ya. 46'

Pitch 1
Umpires:
Hannah Harrison (GBR)
Amber Church (NZL)

29 July 2024
10:30
v

Japan	0–5	China
	Report	Zhong 16'; Li 19'; Ma 23'; Gu 24', 55'

Pitch 2
Umpires:
Annelize Rostron (RSA)
Wanri Venter (RSA)

31 July 2024
20:15
v

Netherlands	3–0	China
Moes 3'; Veen 15'; Verschoor 46'	Report

Pitch 2
Umpires:
Laurine Delforge (BEL)
Irene Presenqui (ARG)

2 August 2024
10:00
v

China	2–4	Germany
Dan 36'; Zou 55'	Report	Lorenz 12', 49'; Stapenhorst 17', 18'

Pitch 1
Umpires:
Sarah Wilson (GBR)
Annelize Rostron (RSA)

3 August 2024
17:00
v

China	7–1	France
Li 9', 25'; Chen Ya. 16', 55'; Zhong 33'; Zhang 41'; Dan 48'	Report	Delemazure 22'

Pitch 1
Umpires:
Alison Keogh (IRE)
Aleisha Neumann (AUS)

Quarterfinal

5 August 2024
10:00
v

Australia	2–3	China
Arnott 10'; T. Stewart 45'	Report	Ma 11'; Dan 20'; Zhong 35'

Pitch 1
Umpires:
Annelize Rostron (RSA)
Wanri Venter (RSA)

Semifinal

7 August 2024
19:00
v

Belgium	1–1	China
Puvrez 59'	Report; Penalty shootout report	Zou 18'
Penalties
Englebert (penalty shoot-out scored); Blockmans (penalty shoot-out scored); Ballenghien (penalty shoot-out missed); Rasir (penalty shoot-out missed); Marien (penalty shoot-out missed)	2–3	(penalty shoot-out missed) Chen Ya. (penalty shoot-out scored) He; (penalty shoot-out scored) Zou; (penalty shoot-out scored) Ma

Pitch 1
Umpires:
Amber Church (NZL)
Aleisha Neumann (AUS)

Gold medal game

9 August 2024
20:00
v

(gold) Netherlands	1–1	China (silver)
Jansen 51'	Report; Penalty shootout report	Chen Yi 6'
Penalties
Sanders (penalty shoot-out scored); Verschoor (penalty shoot-out scored); Moes (penalty shoot-out missed); Veen (penalty shoot-out scored)	3–1	(penalty shoot-out missed) He; (penalty shoot-out missed) Zou; (penalty shoot-out scored) Zhong; (penalty shoot-out missed) Ma

Stade Yves-du-Manoir
Attendance: 14,000
Umpires:
Sarah Wilson (GBR)
Laurine Delforge (BEL)

== Golf ==
China entered four golfers into the Olympic tournament. Yuan Yechun, Dou Zecheng, Yin Ruoning, and Lin Xiyu; all qualified for the games in the men's individual competitions, based on their respective world ranking position, through the release of top 60 ranked players, on the IGF World Rankings.

Athlete	Event	Round 1	Round 2	Round 3	Round 4	Total		
Athlete	Event	Score	Score	Score	Score	Score	Par	Rank
Dou Zecheng	Men's	69	70	77	73	289	+5	53
Yuan Yechun	Men's	70	72	78	72	292	+8	56
Lin Xiyu	Women's	71	70	71	69	281	−7	3rd place, bronze medalist(s)
Yin Ruoning	Women's	72	65	75	72	284	−4	=10

== Gymnastics ==
=== Artistic ===
China fielded a squad of five male gymnasts for Paris after scoring a gold-medal victory in the team all-around at the 2022 World Championships in Liverpool, Great Britain. Meanwhile, five women gymnasts qualified for Paris by virtue of top nine all-around team, not yet qualified at the 2023 World Artistic Gymnastics Championships in Antwerp, Belgium.

Men
Team

Athlete	Event	Qualification								Final							
Athlete	Event	Apparatus						Total	Rank	Apparatus						Total	Rank
Athlete	Event	F	PH	R	V	PB	HB	Total	Rank	F	PH	R	V	PB	HB	Total	Rank
Zou Jingyuan	Team	—N/a	14.600	15.300 Q	—N/a	16.200 Q	—N/a				14.800	14.933	—N/a	16.000	—N/a	—N/a	
Xiao Ruoteng	Team	13.666	14.266	~~13.600~~	14.733	14.800	13.833	84.898	4 Q	13.966	14.333	—N/a	14.800	14.733	13.433	—N/a	
Liu Yang	Team	~~13.200~~	—N/a	15.233 Q	14.100	—N/a						15.500	—N/a			—N/a	
Zhang Boheng	Team	14.466 Q	14.333	14.666	14.666	15.333 Q	15.133 Q	88.597	1 Q	14.233	14.433	14.833	14.533	15.100	14.733	—N/a	
Su Weide	Team	13.300	~~6.666~~	—N/a	~~12.966~~	—N/a	14.400 Q	—N/a		14.333	—N/a		12.766	—N/a	11.600	—N/a	
Total	Team	41.432	43.199	45.199	43.499	46.333	43.366	263.028	1 Q	42.532	43.566	45.266	42.099	45.833	39.766	259.062	2nd place, silver medalist(s)

Individual finals

Athlete	Event	Qualification								Final							
Athlete	Event	Apparatus						Total	Rank	Apparatus						Total	Rank
Athlete	Event	F	PH	R	V	PB	HB	Total	Rank	F	PH	R	V	PB	HB	Total	Rank
Zou Jingyuan	Rings	—N/a		15.300	—N/a			15.300	1 Q	—N/a		15.233	—N/a			15.233	2nd place, silver medalist(s)
Zou Jingyuan	Parallel bars	—N/a				16.200	—N/a	16.200	1 Q	—N/a				16.200	—N/a	16.200	1st place, gold medalist(s)
Xiao Ruoteng	All-around	See team results								14.333	14.266	13.800	14.833	14.766	14.366	86.364	3rd place, bronze medalist(s)
Liu Yang	Rings	—N/a		15.233	—N/a			15.233	2 Q	—N/a		15.300	—N/a			15.300	1st place, gold medalist(s)
Zhang Boheng	All-around	See team results								13.233	14.333	14.600	14.500	15.300	14.633	86.599	2nd place, silver medalist(s)
Zhang Boheng	Floor	14.466	—N/a					14.466	6 Q	13.933	—N/a					13.933	8
Zhang Boheng	Parallel bars	—N/a				15.333	—N/a	15.333	2 Q	—N/a				15.100	—N/a	15.100	4
Zhang Boheng	Horizontal bar	—N/a					15.133	15.133	1 Q	—N/a					13.966	13.966	3rd place, bronze medalist(s)
Su Weide	Horizontal bar	—N/a					14.400	14.400	7 Q	—N/a					13.433	13.433	5

Women
Team

Athlete	Event	Qualification						Final					
Athlete	Event	Apparatus				Total	Rank	Apparatus				Total	Rank
Athlete	Event	V	UB	BB	F	Total	Rank	V	UB	BB	F	Total	Rank
Qiu Qiyuan	Team	13.233	15.066 Q	13.533	~~13.166~~	54.998	8 Q	13.133	14.300	14.600	—N/a	—N/a	
Zhou Yaqin	Team	13.033	—N/a	14.866 Q	13.466	—N/a				12.300	13.200	—N/a	
Luo Huan	Team	—N/a	~~13.900~~	13.733	—N/a			13.166	13.933	13.900	—N/a	—N/a	
Ou Yushan	Team	~~13.000~~	13.966	~~13.333~~	13.666 Q	53.965	12 Q	—N/a			12.733	—N/a	
Zhang Yihan	Team	13.833	14.700 Q	—N/a	13.533	—N/a		13.700	14.433	—N/a	12.733	—N/a	
Total	Team	40.099	43.732	42.132	40.665	166.628	3 Q	39.999	42.666	40.800	38.666	162.131	6

Individual finals

Athlete	Event	Qualification						Final					
Athlete	Event	Apparatus				Total	Rank	Apparatus				Total	Rank
Athlete	Event	V	UB	BB	F	Total	Rank	V	UB	BB	F	Total	Rank
Qiu Qiyuan	All-around	See team results						13.133	13.900	14.500	13.233	54.766	7
Qiu Qiyuan	Uneven bars	—N/a	15.066	—N/a		15.066	2 Q	—N/a	15.500	—N/a		15.500	2nd place, silver medalist(s)
Zhou Yaqin	Balance beam	—N/a		14.866	—N/a	14.866	1 Q	—N/a		14.100	—N/a	14.100	2nd place, silver medalist(s)
Ou Yushan	All-around	See team results						12.966	13.966	14.033	11.933	52.898	16
Ou Yushan	Floor	—N/a			13.666	13.666	6 Q	—N/a			13.000	13.000	8
Zhang Yihan	Uneven bars	—N/a	14.700	—N/a		14.700	5 Q	—N/a	12.800	—N/a		12.800	8

=== Rhythmic ===
China entered a squad of rhythmic gymnast into the games by virtue the results at the 2023 World Championships in Valencia, Spain.

Athlete	Event	Qualification						Final					
Athlete	Event	Hoop	Ball	Clubs	Ribbon	Total	Rank	Hoop	Ball	Clubs	Ribbon	Total	Rank
Wang Zilu	Individual	34.200 (6)	32.000 (15)	30.650 (13)	31.250 (12)	128.100	10 Q	35.250 (3)	32.700 (7)	34.300 (4)	29.300 (9)	131.550	7

Athletes	Event	Qualification				Final			
Athletes	Event	5 apps	3+2 apps	Total	Rank	5 apps.	3+2 apps	Total	Rank
Ding Xinyi; Guo Qiqi; Hao Ting; Huang Zhangjiayang; Wang Lanjing	Group	35.500 (5)	32.400 (3)	67.900	5 Q	36.950 (1)	32.850 (3)	69.800	1st place, gold medalist(s)

=== Trampoline ===
China qualified one gymnast for the men's and one gymnast for women's trampoline with Zhu Xueying, Hu Yicheng, Wang Zisai and Yan Langyu finishing in the top eight of both events at the 2023 World Championships in Birmingham, United Kingdom. In 2024, China achieved two more olympic quotas (one male and one female) in trampoline gymnastics, through the Trampoline World Cup Series; once the Chinese gymnasts (male and female) finished in the top three of the trampoline olympic ranking and also China had qualified two other gymnasts (male and female) previously, through the final ranking of 2023–2024 Trampoline World Cup series.

Athlete	Event	Qualification		Final	
Athlete	Event	Score	Rank	Score	Rank
Yan Langyu	Men's	62.220	3 Q	60.950	3rd place, bronze medalist(s)
Wang Zisai	Men's	62.230	2 Q	61.890	2nd place, silver medalist(s)
Zhu Xueying	Women's	56.720	1 Q	55.510	4
Hu Yicheng	Women's	56.270	3 Q	11.790	8

== Judo ==
China has qualified six judokas via the IJF World Ranking List and continental quotas in Asia.

Athlete	Event	Round of 64	Round of 32	Round of 16	Quarterfinals	Semifinals	Repechage	Final / BM	
Athlete	Event	Opposition Result	Opposition Result	Opposition Result	Opposition Result	Opposition Result	Opposition Result	Opposition Result	Rank
Guo Zongying	Women's −48 kg	—N/a	Laborde (USA); L 00–10	Did not advance					
Zhu Yeqing	Women's −52 kg	—N/a	Khorloodoi (UAE); L 00–10	Did not advance					
Cai Qi	Women's −57 kg	—N/a	Pardayeva (TKM); L 00–10	Did not advance					
Tang Jing	Women's −63 kg	—N/a	Watanabe (PHI); W 10–00	Fazliu (KOS); L 00–10	Did not advance				
Ma Zhenzhao	Women's −78 kg	—N/a	Bye	Yoon H-j (KOR); W 10–01	Sampaio (POR); L 00–10	—N/a	Lytvynenko (UKR); W 10–00	Wagner (GER); W 01–00	3rd place, bronze medalist(s)
Xu Shiyan	Women's +78 kg	—N/a	Bye	Sone (JPN); L 00–01	Did not advance				

== Modern pentathlon ==
Chinese modern pentathletes confirmed three quota places for Paris 2024. Li Shuhuan and Zhang Mingyu secured their spots in the men's and women's event by winning the gold and bronze medal in their respective class at the 2022 Asian Games in Hangzhou, China. Later on, Luo Shuai join the Chinese modern pentathlon squad through nominated as one of highest ranked athletes, not yet qualified, in the Olympic ranking.

Athlete	Event	Fencing ranking round (épée one touch)			Semifinal													Final												
Athlete	Event	Fencing ranking round (épée one touch)			Fencing	Swimming (200 m freestyle)			Riding (show jumping)				Shooting / Running (10 m laser pistol / 3000 m cross-country)			Total points	Final rank	Fencing	Swimming			Riding				Shooting / Running			Total points	Final rank
Athlete	Event	V–D	Rank	MP points	BR	Time	Rank	MP points	Time	Penalties	Rank	MP points	Time	Rank	MP points	Total points	Final rank	BR	Time	Rank	MP points	Time	Penalties	Rank	MP points	Time	Rank	MP points	Total points	Final rank
Li Shuhuan	Men's	19–16	220	16	2	2:09.53	291	16	65.26	9	291	9	10:23.61	677	11	1481	12	Did not advance												
Luo Shuai	Men's	17–18	210	20	0	2:06.75	297	11	58.74	14	286	13	9:58.62	702	3	1495	11	Did not advance												
Zhang Mingyu	Women's	20–15	225	7	2	2:14.72	281	5	59.71	0	300	3	11:59.61	581	10	1389	8 Q	0	2:17.66	275	10	60.93	0	300	3	11:54.40	586	17	1386	14

== Rowing ==
Chinese rowers qualified boats in each of the following classes through the 2023 World Rowing Championships in Belgrade, Serbia.

Men

Athlete	Event	Heats		Repechage		Semifinals		Final	
Athlete	Event	Time	Rank	Time	Rank	Time	Rank	Time	Rank
Liu Zhiyu; Adilijan Suritan	Double sculls	6:29.70	5 R	6:39.06	3 SA/B	6:38.82	5 FB	6:21.98	11

Women

Athlete	Event	Heats		Repechage		Semifinals		Final	
Athlete	Event	Time	Rank	Time	Rank	Time	Rank	Time	Rank
Lu Shiyu; Shen Shuangmei	Double sculls	6:58.85	3 SA/B	Bye		7:09.75	6 FB	7:00.71	12
Zou Jiaqi; Qiu Xiuping	Lightweight double sculls	7:15.03	5 R	7:42.66	5 FC	Bye		7:07.55	13
Chen Yunxia; Zhang Ling; Lü Yang; Cui Xiaotong	Quadruple sculls	6:22.29	3 R	6:28.72	2 FA	—N/a		6:27.08	6
Zhang Shuxian; Liu Xiaoxin; Wang Zifeng; Xu Xingye	Coxless four	6:49.12	3 R	6:33.60	2 FA	—N/a		6:36.18	6

Qualification Legend: FA=Final A (medal); FB=Final B (non-medal); FC=Final C (non-medal); FD=Final D (non-medal); FE=Final E (non-medal); FF=Final F (non-medal); SA/B=Semifinals A/B; SC/D=Semifinals C/D; SE/F=Semifinals E/F; QF=Quarterfinals; R=Repechage

== Rugby sevens ==
Summary

Team	Event	Pool round				Quarterfinal	Semifinal / Cl.	Final / BM / Pl.	
Team	Event	Opposition Result	Opposition Result	Opposition Result	Rank	Opposition Result	Opposition Result	Opposition Result	Rank
China women's	Women's tournament	New Zealand; L 5–43	Fiji; W 40–12	Canada; L 17–26	3 Q	New Zealand; L 5–55	Classification 5–8; Great Britain; W 19–15	Classification 5–6; France; L 7–21	6

=== Women's tournament ===
China women's national rugby sevens team qualified by winning the 2024 Final Olympic Qualification Tournament in Monaco.

Squad

China's squad of 12 players was finalized on 18 July 2024. Additionally, Wang Xiao and Ma Xiaodan were named as traveling reserves.

Head coach: Lu Zhuan

- Gu Yaoyao
- Sun Yue
- Chen Keyi
- Liu Xiaoqian
- Wang Wanyu
- Su Qi
- Hu Yu
- Yan Meiling (c)
- Ruan Hongting
- Yang Feifei
- Zhou Yan
- Dou Xinrong

Group stage

Pos	Team	Pld	W	D	L	PF	PA	PD	Pts	Qualification
1	New Zealand	3	3	0	0	114	19	+95	9	Quarter-finals
2	Canada	3	2	0	1	50	64	−14	7	Quarter-finals
3	China	3	1	0	2	62	81	−19	5	Quarter-finals
4	Fiji	3	0	0	3	33	95	−62	3	

Source: World Rugby
Rules for classification: 1) Points; 2) Head-to-head result; 3) Point difference; 4) Points scored.

28 July 2024
18:00

New Zealand	43–5	China
Try: Blyde (4) 2' m, 4' c, 6' m, 8' c Waaka (2) 7' m, 12' c Hirini 15' c Con: Pouri-Lane (2/5) 4', 9'; King (2/2) 13', 15'	World Rugby	Try: Liu 11' m

Stade de France, Paris
Referee: Ano Kuwai (Japan)

28 July 2024
21:00

Fiji	12–40	China
Try: Nakoci 3' c Delaiwau 9' m Con: Naimasi (1/2) 3'	World Rugby	Try: Wang 1' m Yang 5' c Yan 7' c Chen 8' c Liu 11' c Dou 13' c Con: Gu (4/4) 5', 8', 9', 12'; Chen (1/1) 13'

Stade de France, Paris
Referee: Maggie Cogger-Orr (New Zealand)

29 July 2024
16:00

Canada	26–17	China
Try: Williams (2) 5' c, 11' c Symonds 8' m Logan 14' m Con: Apps (1/1) 6'; Daniels (2/3) 8', 11'	World Rugby	Try: Chen 3' c Liu 8' m Wang 17' m Con: Chen (1/2) 4'

Stade de France, Paris
Referee: Finlay Brown (Scotland/Great Britain)

Quarter-final

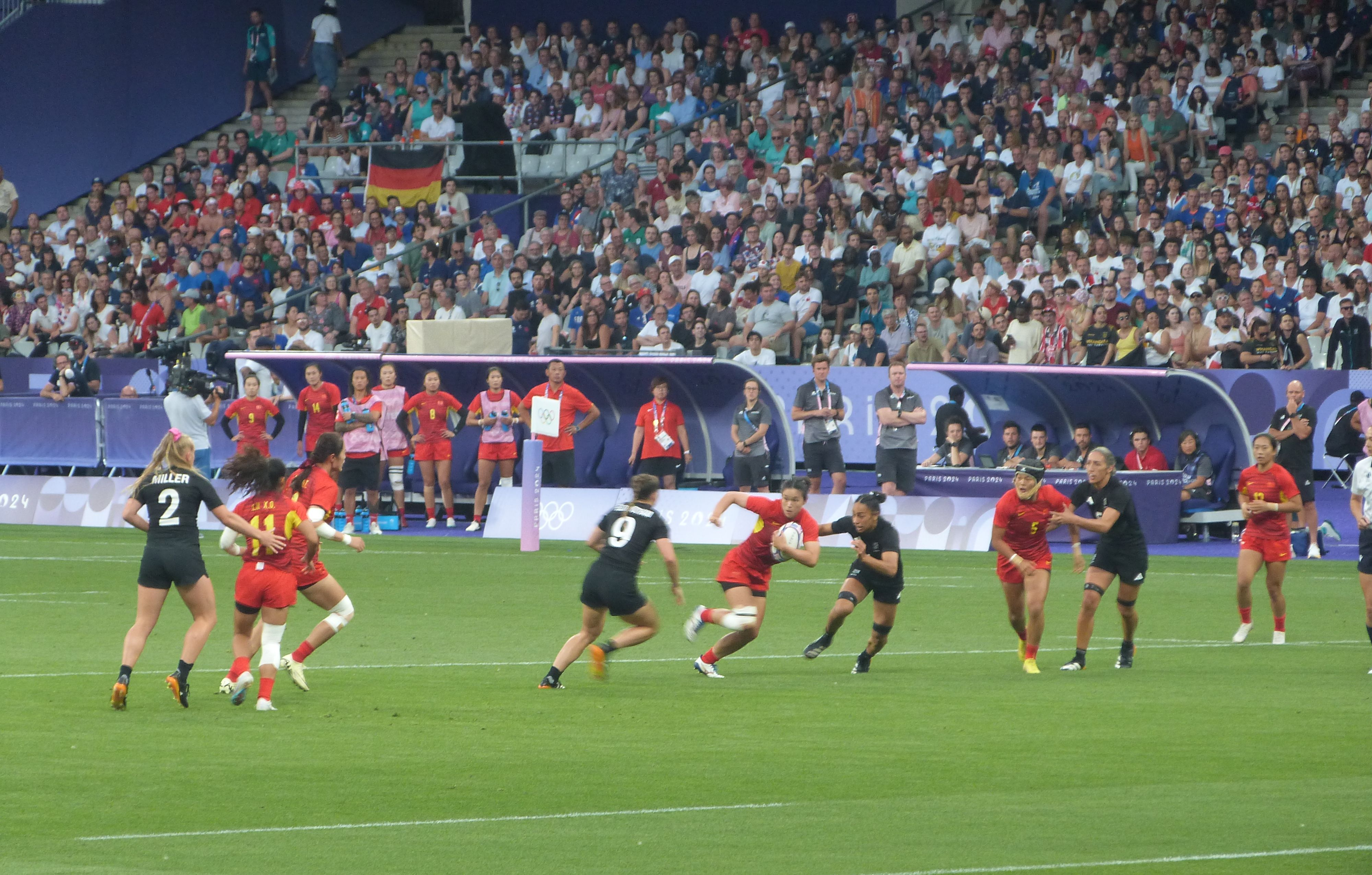
China breaking the line against New Zealand

29 July 2024
21:00

New Zealand	55–5	China
Try: Hirini (2) 1' c, 14' c Felix-Hotham (2) 6' c, 11' m Blyde (2) 7' m, 8' c Woodman-Wickliffe 8' m Paul (2) 12' c, 15' m Con: Pouri-Lane (2/4) 1', 6'; King (3/5) 9', 13', 14'	World Rugby	Try: Dou 4' m

Stade de France, Paris
Referee: Tyler Miller (Australia)

Classification

30 July 2024
14:30

China	19–15	Great Britain
Try: Chen 3' c Yang 6' c Hu 16' m Con: Chen (1/1) 4'; Gu (1/2) 7'	World Rugby	Try: Kildunne 2' m Joyce 8' m Boatman 9' m

Stade de France, Paris
Referee: Cisco Lopez (United States)

Fifth place match

30 July 2024
18:30

China	7–21	France
Try: Liu 11' c Con: Dou (1/1) 11'	World Rugby	Try: Yengo 5' c Noel 9' c Pelle 12' c Con: Yengo (1/1) 5'; Drouin (2/2) 9', 13'

Stade de France, Paris
Referee: Maria Latos (Germany)

== Sailing ==
Chinese sailors qualified one boat in each of the following classes through the 2023 Sailing World Championships in The Hague, Netherlands, 2022 Asian Games in Hangzhou and 2023 Asian Championships in Chon Buri, Thailand.

Elimination events

Athlete	Event	Opening series																Quarterfinal	Semifinal								Final							
Athlete	Event	1	2	3	4	5	6	7	8	9	10	11	12	13	14	Net points	Rank	Rank	1	2	3	4	5	6	Total	Rank	1	2	3	4	5	6	Total	Rank
Huang Jingye	Men's IQFoil	7	11	~~23~~	16	22	17	6	20	~~25~~; ~~BFD~~	23	17	18	14	—N/a	171	19	Did not advance																19
Huang Qibin	Men's Formula Kite	6	~~16~~	4	5	~~14~~	13	6	Cancelled due to inadequate wind speeds							34	10 Q	—N/a	4	4 SCP	—N/a				0	4	Did not advance							8
Yan Zheng	Women's IQFoil	2	~~20~~	11	~~25~~; ~~DSQ~~	3	2	17	17	18	11	16	7	1	5	110	10 Q	1	4	—N/a						4	Did not advance							5
Chen Jingyue	Women's Formula Kite	20	14	9	8	16	~~21~~; ~~DNS~~	Cancelled due to inadequate wind speeds								67	15	Did not advance																15

Medal race events

Athlete	Event	Race													Net points	Final rank
Athlete	Event	1	2	3	4	5	6	7	8	9	10	11	12	M*	Net points	Final rank
Wen Zaiding; Liu Tian	Men's 49er	4	10	15	7	6	15	13	14	5	15.5	~~21~~	14.5	EL	119	13
Gu Min	Women's ILCA 6	2	8	8	~~37~~	19	31	28	25	13	C	—N/a		EL	134	19
Hu Xiaoyu; Shan Mengyuan	Women's 49erFX	16	10	17	6	13	16	18	15	15	17	17	~~21~~	EL	160	20
Xu Zangjun; Lü Yixiao	Mixed 470	4	15	11	11	15	14	~~16~~	16	C		—N/a		EL	86	17
Mai Huicong; Chen Linlin	Mixed Nacra 17	7	14	15	12	14	13	~~20~~	10	10	16	18	1	EL	130	14

M = Medal race; EL = Eliminated – did not advance into the medal race; C = Cancelled

== Shooting ==
Chinese shooters achieved quota places for the following events based on their results at the 2022 and 2023 ISSF World Championships, 2023 and 2024 Asian Championships, and 2024 ISSF World Olympic Qualification Tournament.

Men

Athlete	Event	Qualification		Final	
Athlete	Event	Points	Rank	Points	Rank
Sheng Lihao	10 m air rifle	631.7	1 Q	252.2 OR	1st place, gold medalist(s)
Du Linshu	10 m air rifle	625.0	41	Did not advance	
Liu Yukun	50 m rifle 3 positions	594-38x QOR	1 Q	463.6	1st place, gold medalist(s)
Du Linshu	50 m rifle 3 positions	588-33x	16	Did not advance	
Xie Yu	10 m air pistol	579-16x	6 Q	240.9	1st place, gold medalist(s)
Zhang Bowen	10 m air pistol	573-21x	19	Did not advance	
Li Yuehong	25 m rapid fire pistol	588-30x	1 Q	32	1st place, gold medalist(s)
Wang Xinjie	25 m rapid fire pistol	587-24x	2 Q	23	3rd place, bronze medalist(s)
Qi Ying	Trap	123 (+7)	1 Q	44	2nd place, silver medalist(s)
Yu Haicheng	Trap	122 (+6)	8	Did not advance	
Lyu Jianlin	Skeet	118	17	Did not advance	

Women

Athlete	Event	Qualification		Final	
Athlete	Event	Points	Rank	Points	Rank
Han Jiayu	10 m air rifle	628.1	16	Did not advance	
Huang Yuting	10 m air rifle	632.6	4 Q	251.8 (+10.3) OR	2nd place, silver medalist(s)
Zhang Qiongyue	50 m rifle 3 positions	593-40x QOR	2 Q	452.9	3rd place, bronze medalist(s)
Han Jiayu	50 m rifle 3 positions	578-26x	27	Did not advance	
Jiang Ranxin	10 m air pistol	577-13x	8 Q	156.5	6
Li Xue	10 m air pistol	577-23x	6 Q	178.2	5
Zhao Nan	25 m pistol	586-19x	5 Q	23	5
Liang Xiaoya	25 m pistol	584-23x	9	Did not advance	
Wu Cuicui	Trap	122 (+0+0)	5 Q	17	6
Zhang Xinqiu	Trap	121 (+1)	7	Did not advance	
Wei Meng	Skeet	118	13	Did not advance	
Jiang Yiting	Skeet	119	10	Did not advance	

Mixed

Athlete	Event	Qualification		Final	
Athlete	Event	Points	Rank	Opposition Result	Rank
Huang Yuting; Sheng Lihao	10 m air rifle team	632.2	1 QG	Keum J-h / Park H-j (KOR); W 16–12	1st place, gold medalist(s)
Han Jiayu; Du Linshu	10 m air rifle team	628.5	8	Did not advance	
Jiang Ranxin; Xie Yu	10 m air pistol team	576-20x	8	Did not advance	
Li Xue; Zhang Bowen	10 m air pistol team	578-19x	5	Did not advance	
Jiang Yiting; Lyu Jianlin	Skeet team	146	3 QB	Chauhan / Naruka (IND); W 44–43	3rd place, bronze medalist(s)

== Skateboarding ==
China entered four female skateboarders to compete in each of the following events at the Games.

Athlete	Event	Qualification		Final	
Athlete	Event	Score	Rank	Score	Rank
Zheng Haohao	Women's park	63.19	18	Did not advance	
Cui Chenxi	Women's street	254.34	3 Q	241.56	4
Zeng Wenhui	Women's street	223.49	12	Did not advance	
Zhu Yuanling	Women's street	234.82	9	Did not advance	

== Sport climbing ==
China qualified seven climbers for the Olympic games by virtue of final result at the 2023 World Championships in Bern, Switzerland; 2024 Asian Qualifier in Jakarta, Indonesia; and 2024 Olympic Qualifier Series ranking.

Boulder & lead combined

Athlete	Event	Qualification						Final					
Athlete	Event	Boulder		Lead		Total	Rank	Boulder		Lead		Total	Rank
Athlete	Event	Result	Rank	Result	Rank	Total	Rank	Result	Rank	Result	Rank	Total	Rank
Pan Yufei	Men's	29.0	13	30.1	10	59.1	12	Did not advance					
Zhang Yuetong	Women's	29.7	15	68.0	6	97.7	13	Did not advance					
Luo Zhilu	Women's	63.6	9	48.1	13	111.7	10	Did not advance					

Speed

Athlete	Event	Qualification			Quarterfinals	Semifinals	Final / BM	
Athlete	Event	Seeding		Elimination	Opposition Time	Opposition Time	Opposition Time	Rank
Athlete	Event	Time	Rank	Opposition Time	Opposition Time	Opposition Time	Opposition Time	Rank
Long Jinbao	Men's	5.29	11 Q	Zurloni (ITA); 5.18–5.06	Did not advance			11
Wu Peng	Men's	5.01	5 Q	Shin E-c (KOR); Q 5.00–7.24	Zurloni (ITA); W 4.995–4.997	Watson (USA); W 4.85–4.93	Leonardo (INA); L 4.77–4.75	2nd place, silver medalist(s)
Deng Lijuan	Women's	6.40	5 Q	Viglione (FRA); Q 6.48–6.86	Dewi (INA); W 6.363–6.369	Sallsabillah (INA); W 6.38–6.41	Mirosław (POL); L 6.18–6.10	2nd place, silver medalist(s)
Zhou Yafei	Women's	6.389	4 Q	Colli (ITA); Q 6.55–6.84	Kałucka (POL); L 6.58–6.49	Did not advance		7

== Surfing ==
China surfers confirmed one shortboard quota place for Tahiti 2024. Yang Siqi qualified for the games at the 2024 ISA World Surfing Games in Arecibo, Puerto Rico, marking China's debut in the sport.

Athlete	Event	Round 1		Round 2	Round 3	Quarterfinal	Semifinal	Final / BM	
Athlete	Event	Score	Rank	Opposition Result	Opposition Result	Opposition Result	Opposition Result	Opposition Result	Rank
Yang Siqi	Women's shortboard	5.40	3 R2	Aguirre (PER); W 8.67–4.50	Marks (USA); L 1.63–6.93	Did not advance			

Qualification legend: R3 – Qualifies to elimination rounds; R2 – Qualifies to repechage round

== Swimming ==
Chinese swimmers achieved the entry standards in the following events for Paris 2024 (a maximum of two swimmers under the Olympic Qualifying Time (OST) and potentially at the Olympic Consideration Time (OCT)):

Men

Athlete	Event	Heat		Semifinal		Final	
Athlete	Event	Time	Rank	Time	Rank	Time	Rank
Pan Zhanle	100 m freestyle	48.40	13= Q	47.21	1 Q	46.40 WR	1st place, gold medalist(s)
Wang Haoyu	100 m freestyle	48.79	22	Did not advance			
Pan Zhanle	200 m freestyle	1:49.47	22	Did not advance			
Ji Xinjie	200 m freestyle	1:49.88	23	Did not advance			
Zhang Zhanshuo	400 m freestyle	3:46.76	12	—N/a		Did not advance	
Fei Liwei	400 m freestyle	3:44.60	3 Q	—N/a		3:44.24	6
Zhang Zhanshuo	800 m freestyle	7:54.44	21	—N/a		Did not advance	
Fei Liwei	800 m freestyle	7:47.11	10	—N/a		Did not advance	
Fei Liwei	1500 m freestyle	14:50.06	9	—N/a		Did not advance	
Xu Jiayu	100 m backstroke	53.20	6= Q	52.02	1 Q	52.32	2nd place, silver medalist(s)
Xu Jiayu	200 m backstroke	DNS		Did not advance			
Qin Haiyang	100 m breaststroke	59.58	9 Q	58.93	2 Q	59.50	7
Sun Jiajun	100 m breaststroke	1:00.11	17	Did not advance			
Qin Haiyang	200 m breaststroke	2:10.98	15 Q	2:09.96	10=	Did not advance	
Dong Zhihao	200 m breaststroke	2:09.91	6 Q	2:08.99	3 Q	2:08.46	4
Wang Changhao	100 m butterfly	52.37	26	Did not advance			
Sun Jiajun	100 m butterfly	51.85	19	Did not advance			
Niu Guangsheng	200 m butterfly	DNS		Did not advance			
Wang Shun	200 m medley	1:58.09	6 Q	1:56.54	4 Q	1:56.00	3rd place, bronze medalist(s)
Zhang Zhanshuo	400 m medley	4:12.71	10	—N/a		Did not advance	
Chen Juner; Ji Xinjie; Pan Zhanle; Wang Haoyu	4 × 100 m freestyle relay	3:11.62	1 Q	—N/a		3:11.28	4
Fei Liwei; Ji Xinjie; Niu Guangsheng^{[a]} Pan Zhanle; Zhang Zhanshuo	4 × 200 m freestyle relay	7:07.72	6 Q	—N/a		7:04.37	4
Xu Jiayu; Qin Haiyang; Wang Changhao^{[a]} Sun Jiajun; Pan Zhanle	4 × 100 m medley relay	3:31.58	2 Q	—N/a		3:27.46	1st place, gold medalist(s)

Women

Athlete	Event	Heat		Semifinal		Final	
Athlete	Event	Time	Rank	Time	Rank	Time	Rank
Wu Qingfeng	50 m freestyle	24.57	=8 Q	24.40	=7 Q	24.37	7
Zhang Yufei	50 m freestyle	24.54	6 Q	24.24	4 Q	24.20	3rd place, bronze medalist(s)
Yang Junxuan	100 m freestyle	53.05	3 Q	52.81	4 Q	52.82	6
Wu Qingfeng	100 m freestyle	54.03	13 Q	53.34	9	Did not advance	
Yang Junxuan	200 m freestyle	1:56.83	9 Q	1:55.90	5 Q	1:55.38	5
Li Bingjie	200 m freestyle	1:56.28	4 Q	1:56.56	10	Did not advance	
Li Bingjie	400 m freestyle	4:03.96	9	—N/a		Did not advance	
Liu Yaxin	400 m freestyle	4:04.39	10	—N/a		Did not advance	
Li Bingjie	800 m freestyle	8:27.92	9	—N/a		Did not advance	
Li Bingjie	1500 m freestyle	16:05.26	6 Q	—N/a		16:01.03	5
Gao Weizhong	1500 m freestyle	16:27.11	13	—N/a		Did not advance	
Wan Letian	100 m backstroke	59.87	11 Q	1:00.06	12	Did not advance	
Wang Xueer	100 m backstroke	1:00.15	14 Q	59.89	11	Did not advance	
Peng Xuwei	200 m backstroke	2:08.29	1 Q	2:07.86	4 Q	2:07.96	6
Tang Qianting	100 m breaststroke	1:05.63	2 Q	1:05.83	4 Q	1:05.54	2nd place, silver medalist(s)
Yang Chang	100 m breaststroke	1:06.91	17 Q	1:07.20	14	Did not advance	
Ye Shiwen	200 m breaststroke	2:23.67	4 Q	2:23.13	5 Q	2:24.31	6
Zhang Yufei	100 m butterfly	56.50	1 Q	56.15	3 Q	56.21	3rd place, bronze medalist(s)
Zhang Yufei	200 m butterfly	2:06.55	1 Q	2:06.09	3 Q	2:05.09	3rd place, bronze medalist(s)
Chen Luying	200 m butterfly	2:09.31	11 Q	2:08.07	10	Did not advance	
Yu Yiting	200 m medley	2:10.28	2 Q	2:09.74	6 Q	2:08.49	4
Ye Shiwen	200 m medley	2:10.96	8 Q	2:10.45	10	Did not advance	
Cheng Yujie; Wu Qingfeng; Yang Junxuan; Yu Yiting^{[a]} Zhang Yufei	4 × 100 m freestyle relay	3:34.31	3 Q	—N/a		3:30.30 AS	3rd place, bronze medalist(s)
Ge Chutong; Kong Yaqi^{[a]} Li Bingjie; Liu Yaxin; Tang Muhan^{[a]} Yang Junxuan	4 × 200 m freestyle relay	7:52.36	3 Q	—N/a		7:42.34	3rd place, bronze medalist(s)
Wang Xueer^{[a]} Wan Letian; Tang Qianting; Yu Yiting^{[a]} Zhang Yufei; Wu Qingfeng^{[a]} Yang Junxuan	4 × 100 m medley relay	3:56.34	3 Q	—N/a		3:53.23	3rd place, bronze medalist(s)
Xin Xin	10 km open water	—N/a				2:27:02.9	24

Mixed

Athlete	Event	Heat		Final	
Athlete	Event	Time	Rank	Time	Rank
Xu Jiayu; Tang Qianting^{[a]} Zhang Yufei; Pan Zhanle^{[a]} Qin Haiyang; Yang Junxuan	4 × 100 m medley relay	3:42.26	3 Q	3:37.55 AS	2nd place, silver medalist(s)

^{a} Swimmers who participated in the heats only.

== Table tennis ==
China entered a full squad of male & female table tennis player into the Games, by virtue of their gold medal results at the 2023 Asian Championships in Pyeongchang, South Korea. The nations also entered one mixed doubles pair through the allocations of final world ranking.

Men

Athlete	Event	Preliminary	Round of 64	Round of 32	Round of 16	Quarterfinals	Semifinals	Final / BM	
Athlete	Event	Opposition Result	Opposition Result	Opposition Result	Opposition Result	Opposition Result	Opposition Result	Opposition Result	Rank
Wang Chuqin	Singles	Bye	Wang Y (SVK); W 4–1	Möregårdh (SWE); L 2–4	Did not advance				
Fan Zhendong	Singles	Bye	Zhmudenko (UKR); W 4–0	Wong (HKG); W 4–1	Jha (USA); W 4–0	Harimoto (JPN); W 4–3	F Lebrun (FRA); W 4–0	Möregårdh (SWE); W 4–1	1st place, gold medalist(s)
Fan Zhendong; Ma Long; Wang Chuqin	Team	—N/a			India; W 3–0	South Korea; W 3–0	France; W 3–0	Sweden; W 3–0	1st place, gold medalist(s)

Women

Athlete	Event	Preliminary	Round of 64	Round of 32	Round of 16	Quarterfinals	Semifinals	Final / BM	
Athlete	Event	Opposition Result	Opposition Result	Opposition Result	Opposition Result	Opposition Result	Opposition Result	Opposition Result	Rank
Sun Yingsha	Singles	Bye	G Takahashi (BRA); W 4–0	Ni (LUX); W 4–0	Akula (IND); W 4–0	Cheng (TPE); W 4–0	Hayata (JPN); W 4–0	Chen (CHN); L 2–4	2nd place, silver medalist(s)
Chen Meng	Singles	Bye	Loghraibi (ALG); W 4–0	Bergström (SWE); W 4–1	Eerland (NED); W 4–1	Polcanova (AUT); W 4–0	Shin Y-b (KOR); W 4–0	Sun (CHN); W 4–2	1st place, gold medalist(s)
Chen Meng; Sun Yingsha; Wang Manyu	Team	—N/a			Egypt; W 3–0	Chinese Taipei; W 3–0	South Korea; W 3–0	Japan; W 3–0	1st place, gold medalist(s)

Mixed

Athlete	Event	Round of 16	Quarterfinals	Semifinals	Final / BM	
Athlete	Event	Opposition Result	Opposition Result	Opposition Result	Opposition Result	Rank
Wang Chuqin; Sun Yingsha	Doubles	O Assar / Meshref (EGY); W 4–0	Lin / Chen (TPE); W 4–2	Lim J-h / Shin Y-b (KOR); W 4–2	Ri J-s / Kim K-y (PRK); W 4–2	1st place, gold medalist(s)

== Taekwondo ==
China qualified six athletes to compete at the games. Four athletes qualified for Paris 2024 by virtue of finishing within the top five in the Olympic rankings in their respective division, and finishing first within the Grand Slam series rankings. Meanwhile, Song Zhaoxiang qualified for the games, after winning the semifinal rounds in his class, at the 2024 Asian Qualification Tournament in Tai'an.

Athlete	Event	Qualification	Round of 16	Quarterfinals	Semifinals	Repechage	Final / BM	
Athlete	Event	Opposition Result	Opposition Result	Opposition Result	Opposition Result	Opposition Result	Opposition Result	Rank
Liang Yushuai	Men's −68 kg	Bye	Józsa (HUN); W 2–1	Rashitov (UZB); L 0–2	Did not advance	Lo (HKG); W 2–0	Sinden (GBR); W	3rd place, bronze medalist(s)
Song Zhaoxiang	Men's +80 kg	Bye	Healy (USA); L 1–2	Did not advance				
Guo Qing	Women's −49 kg	Bye	Pouryounes (EOR); W 2–0	Dinçel (TUR); W 2–0	Nematzadeh (IRI); W 2–0	Bye	Wongpattanakit (THA); L 1–2	2nd place, silver medalist(s)
Luo Zongshi	Women's −57 kg	Bye	Atora (GAB); W 2–0	Pacheco (BRA); W 2–1	Kim Y-j (KOR); L 1–2	Bye	Kimia (BUL); L 1–2	5
Song Jie	Women's −67 kg	Bye	Anyanacho (NGR); W 2–0	Al-Sadeq (JOR); W 2–1	Perišić (SRB); L 0–2	Bye	Teachout (USA); L 0–2	5
Zhou Zeqi	Women's +67 kg	Bye	Jahl (AUT); W 2–0	Lee D-b (KOR); L 1–2	Did not advance			

== Tennis ==
China entered two tennis players into the Olympic tournament. Zhang Zhizhen and Qinwen Zheng secured an outright berth by winning the men's and women's singles titles at the 2022 Asian Games in Hangzhou, China.

Later, Yuan Yue, Wang Xinyu and Wang Xiyu qualified through WTA rankings, as well as Zhang Shuai and Zheng Saisai in the doubles competition via combined rankings.

Athlete	Event	Round of 64	Round of 32	Round of 16	Quarterfinal	Semifinal	Final / BM	
Athlete	Event	Opposition Result	Opposition Result	Opposition Result	Opposition Result	Opposition Result	Opposition Result	Rank
Zhang Zhizhen	Men's singles	Macháč (CZE); L 2–6, 6–4, 2–6	Did not advance					
Zheng Qinwen	Women's singles	Errani (ITA); W 6–0, 6–0	Rus (NED); W 6–2, 6–4	Navarro (USA); W 6–7^{(7–9)}, 7–6^{(7–4)}, 6–1	Kerber (GER); W 6–7^{(4–7)}, 6–4, 7–6^{(8–6)}	Świątek (POL); W 6–2, 7–5	Vekić (CRO); W 6–2, 6–3	1st place, gold medalist(s)
Yuan Yue	Women's singles	Alexandrova (AIN); W 7–5, 6–7^{(0–7)}, 6–2	Sakkari (GRE); L 2–6, 1–6	Did not advance				
Wang Xinyu	Women's singles	Korpatsch (GER); W 6–2, 6–1	Krejčíková (CZE); L 3–6, 2–6	Did not advance				
Wang Xiyu	Women's singles	Nosková (CZE); W 6–3, 6–3	Shnaider (AIN); W 6–3, 6–1	Świątek (POL); L 3–6, 4–6	Did not advance			
Yuan Yue; Zhang Shuai	Women's doubles	—N/a	Haddad Maia / Stefani (BRA); L 4–6, 4–6	Did not advance				
Wang Xinyu; Zheng Saisai	Women's doubles	—N/a	L Kichenok / N Kichenok (UKR); L 1–6, 4–6	Did not advance				
Wang Xinyu; Zhang Zhizhen	Mixed doubles	—N/a		Stefani / Seyboth Wild (BRA); W 3–6, 6–3, [10–8]	Perez / Ebden (AUS); W 6–7^{(8–10)}, 7–6^{(10–8)}, [10–5]	Schuurs / Koolhof (NED); W 2–6, 6–4, [10–4]	Siniaková / Macháč (CZE); L 2–6, 7–5, [8–10]	2nd place, silver medalist(s)

== Triathlon ==
China entered one female triathlete in the triathlon events for Paris, following the release of final individual olympics qualification ranking.

Individual

Athlete	Event	Time						Rank
Athlete	Event	Swim (1.5 km)	Trans 1	Bike (40 km)	Trans 2	Run (10 km)	Total	Rank
Lin Xinyu	Women's	23:38	0:55	58:18	0:32	37:27	2:00:50	28

== Volleyball ==
=== Beach ===
Chinese women's pair qualified for Paris based on the FIVB Beach Volleyball Olympic Ranking.

Athletes	Event	Preliminary round				Round of 16	Quarterfinal	Semifinal	Final / BM	
Athletes	Event	Opposition Score	Opposition Score	Opposition Score	Rank	Opposition Score	Opposition Score	Opposition Score	Opposition Score	Rank
Xia Xinyi; Xue Chen	Women's	Mariafe / Clancy (AUS); L (20–22, 21–14, 14–16)	Bansley / Bukovec (CAN); W (21–15, 21–19)	Nuss / Kloth (USA); L (21–15, 16–21, 12–15)	3 Q	Böbner / Vergé-Dépré (SUI); L (27–29, 17–21)	Did not advance			9

=== Indoor ===
Summary

Team	Event	Group stage				Quarterfinal	Semifinal	Final / BM	
Team	Event	Opposition Score	Opposition Score	Opposition Score	Rank	Opposition Score	Opposition Score	Opposition Score	Rank
China women's	Women's tournament	United States; W 3–2	France; W 3–0	Serbia; W 3–1	1 Q	Turkey; L 2–3	Did not advance		

==== Women's tournament ====
China women's volleyball team qualified for the Olympics as the second highest eligible ranked team, in the World Ranking qualification.

Team roster

The roster was announced on 29 June 2024.

Head coach: Cai Bin

- 1 Yuan Xinyue (c) MB
- 2 Zhu Ting OH
- 3 Diao Linyu S
- 5 Gao Yi MB
- 6 Gong Xiangyu OP
- 7 Wang Yuanyuan MB
- 9 Zhang Changning OH
- 12 Li Yingying OH
- 14 Zheng Yixin OP
- 16 Ding Xia S
- 18 Wang Mengjie L
- 21 Wu Mengjie OH

Group play

Pos	Team	Pld	W	L	Pts	SW	SL	SR	SPW	SPL	SPR	Qualification
1	China	3	3	0	8	9	3	3.000	277	249	1.112	Quarter-finals
2	United States	3	2	1	6	8	5	1.600	286	278	1.029	Quarter-finals
3	Serbia	3	1	2	4	6	6	1.000	271	257	1.054	Quarter-finals
4	France (H)	3	0	3	0	0	9	0.000	183	233	0.785	

Source: Olympics
Rules for classification: Tiebreakers
(H) Host

29 July 2024; 17:00	United States	2–3	China	South Paris Arena 1, Paris; Attendance: 9,434; Referees: Sumie Myoi (JPN), Karina Rene (ARG)
29 July 2024; 17:00	(20–25, 19–25, 25–17, 25–20, 13–15); P2 Report			South Paris Arena 1, Paris; Attendance: 9,434; Referees: Sumie Myoi (JPN), Karina Rene (ARG)

1 August 2024; 21:00	France	0–3	China	South Paris Arena 1, Paris; Attendance: 9,434; Referees: Wael Kandil (EGY), Ivaylo Ivanov (BUL)
1 August 2024; 21:00	(18–25, 16–25, 19–25); P2 Report			South Paris Arena 1, Paris; Attendance: 9,434; Referees: Wael Kandil (EGY), Ivaylo Ivanov (BUL)

4 August 2024; 17:00	China	3–1	Serbia	South Paris Arena 1, Paris; Attendance: 9,395; Referees: Karina Rene (ARG), Angela Grass (BRA)
4 August 2024; 17:00	(21–25, 25–20, 25–22, 29–27); P2 Report			South Paris Arena 1, Paris; Attendance: 9,395; Referees: Karina Rene (ARG), Angela Grass (BRA)

Quarterfinal

6 August 2024; 09:00	China	2–3	Turkey	South Paris Arena 1, Paris; Attendance: 9,271; Referees: Scott Dziewirz (CAN), Hamid Al-Rousi (UAE)
6 August 2024; 09:00	(25–23, 21–25, 24–26, 25–21, 12–15); P2 Report			South Paris Arena 1, Paris; Attendance: 9,271; Referees: Scott Dziewirz (CAN), Hamid Al-Rousi (UAE)

== Water polo ==
Summary

Key:
- FT – After full time.
- P – Match decided by penalty-shootout.

Team	Event	Group stage					Quarterfinal	Semifinal	Final / BM	
Team	Event	Opposition Score	Opposition Score	Opposition Score	Opposition Score	Rank	Opposition Score	Opposition Score	Opposition Score	Rank
China women's	Women's tournament	Australia; L 5–7	Netherlands; L 11–15	Canada; L 7–12	Hungary; L 11–17	5	Did not advance			10

=== Women's tournament ===
China women's national water polo team qualified for the Olympics after winning the gold medal at the 2022 Asian Games in Hangzhou, China.

Team roster

The roster was announced on 13 July 2024.

Head coach: Juan Jané

- 1 Deng Zewen GK
- 2 Yan Siya D
- 3 Yan Jing CF
- 4 Xiong Dunhan CF
- 5 Zhong Qiyun W
- 6 Wang Xuan CB
- 7 Lu Yiwen W
- 8 Wang Huan W
- 9 Dong Wenxin D
- 10 Nong Sanfeng CB
- 11 Chen Xiao CF
- 12 Zhang Jing (c) D
- 13 Shen Yineng GK

Group play

Pos	Team	Pld	W	PSW	PSL	L	GF	GA	GD	Pts	Qualification
1	Australia	4	2	2	0	0	33	28	+5	10 (Note: Netherlands 14–15 Australia)	Quarterfinals
2	Netherlands	4	3	0	1	0	52	37	+15	10	Quarterfinals
3	Hungary	4	2	0	1	1	46	37	+9	7	Quarterfinals
4	Canada	4	1	0	0	3	37	49	−12	3	Quarterfinals
5	China	4	0	0	0	4	34	51	−17	0	

Source: Olympics
Rules for classification: 1) Points; 2) Head-to-head points; 3) Head-to-head goal difference; 4) Head-to-head goals scored; 5) Goal difference.
Notes:

27 July 2024; 20:05 v	Report	Australia	7–5	China	Paris Aquatic Centre, Paris; Referees: Jennifer McCall (USA), Aurélie Blanchard (FRA)
27 July 2024; 20:05 v	Report	Score by quarters: 3–2, 2–1, 0–0, 2–2			Paris Aquatic Centre, Paris; Referees: Jennifer McCall (USA), Aurélie Blanchard (FRA)
27 July 2024; 20:05 v	Report	Andrews 3	Goals	Wang H. 2	Paris Aquatic Centre, Paris; Referees: Jennifer McCall (USA), Aurélie Blanchard (FRA)

29 July 2024; 18:30 v	Report	China	11–15	Netherlands	Paris Aquatic Centre, Paris; Referees: Alessia Ferrari (ITA), Chisato Kurosaki (JPN)
29 July 2024; 18:30 v	Report	Score by quarters: 4–1, 4–4, 1–5, 2–5			Paris Aquatic Centre, Paris; Referees: Alessia Ferrari (ITA), Chisato Kurosaki (JPN)
29 July 2024; 18:30 v	Report	three players 2	Goals	Keuning, Van der Sloot 3	Paris Aquatic Centre, Paris; Referees: Alessia Ferrari (ITA), Chisato Kurosaki (JPN)

31 July 2024; 15:35 v	Report	Canada	12–7	China	Paris Aquatic Centre, Paris; Referees: Boris Margeta (SLO), Frank Ohme (GER)
31 July 2024; 15:35 v	Report	Score by quarters: 4–0, 1–3, 4–1, 3–3			Paris Aquatic Centre, Paris; Referees: Boris Margeta (SLO), Frank Ohme (GER)
31 July 2024; 15:35 v	Report	four players 2	Goals	Deng 3	Paris Aquatic Centre, Paris; Referees: Boris Margeta (SLO), Frank Ohme (GER)

2 August 2024; 20:05 v	Report	China	11–17	Hungary	Paris Aquatic Centre, Paris; Referees: Marta Cabañas (ESP), Aurélie Blanchard (FRA)
2 August 2024; 20:05 v	Report	Score by quarters: 4–3, 3–5, 2–4, 2–5			Paris Aquatic Centre, Paris; Referees: Marta Cabañas (ESP), Aurélie Blanchard (FRA)
2 August 2024; 20:05 v	Report	Deng, Lu 3	Goals	Keszthelyi 7	Paris Aquatic Centre, Paris; Referees: Marta Cabañas (ESP), Aurélie Blanchard (FRA)

== Weightlifting ==
China qualified six weightlifters into the Olympic competition. Li Fabin (men's 61 kg), Liu Huanhua (men's 102 kg), Luo Shifang (women's 59 kg) and Li Wenwen (women's +81 kg), secured one of the top ten slots, each in their respective weight division based on the IWF Olympic Qualification Rankings.

Athlete	Event	Snatch		Clean & Jerk		Total	Rank
Athlete	Event	Result	Rank	Result	Rank	Total	Rank
Li Fabin	Men's −61 kg	143 OR	1	167	4	310	1st place, gold medalist(s)
Shi Zhiyong	Men's −73 kg	165	1	~~191~~	DNF	—	DNF
Liu Huanhua	Men's −102 kg	186	1	220	1	406	1st place, gold medalist(s)
Hou Zhihui	Women's −49 kg	89	2	117 OR	1	206	1st place, gold medalist(s)
Luo Shifang	Women's −59 kg	107 OR	1	134 OR	1	241 OR	1st place, gold medalist(s)
Li Wenwen	Women's +81 kg	136	1	173	1	309	1st place, gold medalist(s)

== Wrestling ==
China qualified eleven wrestlers for the following classes into the Olympic competition. Three of them qualified for the games by virtue of top five results through the 2023 World Championships in Belgrade, Serbia; four wrestlers qualified for the games, by winning their semifinal match, in their respective divisions, at the 2024 Asian Olympic Qualification Tournament in Bishkek, Kyrgyzstan; and six wrestlers qualified for the games through the 2024 World Qualification Tournament in Istanbul, Turkey, however, Lu Feng joined the squads due to the reallocation of Individual Neutral Athletes (AIN) claimed by the IOC.

Key:

- VT (ranking points: 5–0 or 0–5) – Victory by fall.
- VB (ranking points: 5–0 or 0–5) – Victory by injury (VF for forfeit, VA for withdrawal or disqualification)
- PP (ranking points: 3–1 or 1–3) – Decision by points – the loser with technical points.
- PO (ranking points: 3–0 or 0–3) – Decision by points – the loser without technical points.
- ST (ranking points: 4–0 or 0–4) – Great superiority – the loser without technical points and a margin of victory of at least 8 (Greco-Roman) or 10 (freestyle) points.
- SP (ranking points: 4–1 or 1–4) – Technical superiority – the loser with technical points and a margin of victory of at least 8 (Greco-Roman) or 10 (freestyle) points.

Freestyle

Athlete	Event	Round of 32	Round of 16	Quarterfinal	Semifinal	Repechage	Final / BM	
Athlete	Event	Opposition Result	Opposition Result	Opposition Result	Opposition Result	Opposition Result	Opposition Result	Rank
Zou Wanhao	Men's −57 kg	—N/a	Lee (USA); L 1–3 ^{PP}	Did not advance		Uulu (KGZ); L 0–5 ^{VT}	Did not advance	
Lu Feng	Men's −74 kg	Bye	Hussen (EGY); W 4–1 ^{SP}	Rassadin (TJK); L 1–3 ^{PP}	Did not advance			
Habila Awusayiman	Men's −97 kg	—N/a	Snyder (USA); L 1–3 ^{PP}	Did not advance				
Deng Zhiwei	Men's −125 kg	—N/a	Dhesi (CAN); L 1–3 ^{PP}	Did not advance				
Feng Ziqi	Women's −50 kg	—N/a	Mohamed (EGY); W 5–0 ^{VT}	Hildebrandt (USA); L 1–3 ^{PP}	Did not advance	Doudou (ALG); W 4–0 ^{ST}	Dolgorjavyn (MGL); W 3–1 ^{PP}	3rd place, bronze medalist(s)
Pang Qianyu	Women's −53 kg	—N/a	Aquino (GUM); W 4–0 ^{ST}	Malmgren (SWE); W 3–1 ^{PP}	Fujinami (JPN); L 0–4 ^{ST}	Bye	Batkhuyagiin (MGL); W 5–0 ^{VT}	3rd place, bronze medalist(s)
Hong Kexin	Women's −57 kg	—N/a	Boldsaikhan (MGL); W 3–1 ^{PP}	Adekuoroye (NGR); W 5–0 ^{VT}	Nichita (MDA); L 0–5 ^{VT}	Bye	Penalber (BRA); W 4–0 ^{ST}	3rd place, bronze medalist(s)
Zhou Feng	Women's −68 kg	—N/a	Chołuj (POL); L 1–3 ^{PP}	Did not advance				
Wang Juan	Women's −76 kg	—N/a	Kyzy (KGZ); L 1–3 ^{PP}	Did not advance				

Greco-Roman

Athlete	Event	Round of 32	Round of 16	Quarterfinals	Semifinals	Repechage	Final / BM	
Athlete	Event	Opposition Result	Opposition Result	Opposition Result	Opposition Result	Opposition Result	Opposition Result	Rank
Cao Liguo	Men's −60 kg	Bye	Mohamed (EGY); W 3–1 ^{PP}	Rodríguez (VEN); W 3–1 ^{PP}	Ri S-u (PRK); W 3–1 ^{PP}	Bye	Fumita (JPN); L 1–3 ^{PP}	2nd place, silver medalist(s)
Qian Haitao	Men's −87 kg	—N/a	Beleniuk (UKR); L 1–3 ^{PP}	Did not advance				
Meng Lingzhe	Men's −130 kg	—N/a	Krahmer (GER); W 3–1 ^{PP}	Knystautas (LTU); W 3–1 ^{PP}	Acosta (CHI); L 1–3 ^{PP}	Bye	Mohamed (EGY); W 3–1 ^{PP}	3rd place, bronze medalist(s)

== See also ==
- China at the 2024 Winter Youth Olympics
- China at the 2024 Summer Paralympics
