= Gymnastics at the 2022 Asian Games – Men's trampoline =

Men's trampoline analysis at the 2022 Asian Games

Men's individual at the 2022 Asian Games
- Venue: Huanglong Gymnasium
- Date: 3 October 2023
- Competitors: 10 from 6 nations

Medalists
gold medal	Yan Langyu	China
silver medal	Danil Mussabayev	Kazakhstan
bronze medal	Hiroto Yamada	Japan

The men's trampoline competition at the 2022 Asian Games took place on 3 October 2023 at the Huanglong Sports Centre Gymnasium.

== Schedule ==
All times are China Standard Time (UTC+08:00)

Date	Time	Event
Tuesday, 3 October 2023	14:00	Qualification
Tuesday, 3 October 2023	15:20	Final

== Results ==
=== Qualification ===
Rank	Athlete	Routine 1	Routine 2	Best
1	Wang Zisai (CHN)	61.12		61.12
2	Yan Langyu (CHN)	6.80	59.43	59.43
3	Hiroto Yamada (JPN)	57.08	58.58	58.58
4	Hayato Miyano (JPN)	53.96	57.13	57.13
5	Mirshokhid Khasanboev (UZB)	56.41		56.41
6	Danil Mussabayev (KAZ)	56.30		56.30
7	Bashar Al-Turk (JOR)	52.40	53.86	53.86
8	Pirmammad Aliyev (KAZ)	34.08	53.25	53.25
9	Lee Kwun Wai (HKG)	50.17	48.19	50.17
10	Marcus Lai (HKG)	49.19	49.30	49.30

=== Final ===
Rank	Athlete	Score
1st place, gold medalist(s)	Yan Langyu (CHN)	59.85
2nd place, silver medalist(s)	Danil Mussabayev (KAZ)	57.27
3rd place, bronze medalist(s)	Hiroto Yamada (JPN)	57.10
4	Mirshokhid Khasanboev (UZB)	53.22
5	Hayato Miyano (JPN)	52.72
6	Bashar Al-Turk (JOR)	52.04
7	Pirmammad Aliyev (KAZ)	17.88
8	Wang Zisai (CHN)	13.09
