= Trampoline gymnastics at the 2025 World Games – Men's synchronized =

Men's synchronized at the 2025 World Games
- Venue: Dong'an Lake Sports Park Gymnasium, Chengdu, China
- Date: 8 August
- Competitors: 16 from 8 nations
- Winning total: 31.790 points

Medalists
| 1st place, gold medalist(s) | | Gabriel Albuquerque; Lucas Santos | Portugal |
| 2nd place, silver medalist(s) | | Rikkert Veldhuizen; Jordy Mol | Netherlands |
| 3rd place, bronze medalist(s) | | Caio Lauxtermann; Fabian Vogel | Germany |

The men's synchronized competition at the 2025 World Games took place on 8 August at the Dong'an Lake Sports Park Gymnasium in Chengdu, China.

== Competition format ==
The top 4 teams in qualifications, based on the best score between the two exercises, advanced to the semifinal. At the semifinals, the teams are divided in two groups. The best score of each group advances to the gold medal final.

== Results ==
=== Qualification ===
The results were a follows:

| Nation | Team | First Exercise | | Second Exercise | | Total | |
| Nation | Team | Score | Rank | Score | Rank | Score | Rank |
|---|---|---|---|---|---|---|---|
| France | Florestan Riou; Julian Chartier | 52.440 | 1 | 0.000 | 8 | 52.440 | 1 |
| Portugal | Gabriel Albuquerque; Lucas Santos | 51.550 | 2 | 16.210 | 5 | 51.550 | 2 |
| Germany | Caio Lauxtermann; Fabian Vogel | 50.610 | 3 | 51.190 | 1 | 51.190 | 3 |
| Netherlands | Rikkert Veldhuizen; Jordy Mol | 50.140 | 4 | 48.600 | 3 | 50.140 | 4 |
| United States | Isaac Rowley; Elijah Vogel | 26.880 | 7 | 49.630 | 2 | 49.630 | 5 |
| Great Britain | Corey Walkes; Zak Perzamanos | 48.710 | 5 | 5.740 | 6 | 48.710 | 6 |
| Sweden | Oscar Smith; Jonas Nordfors | 29.610 | 6 | 43.950 | 4 | 43.950 | 7 |
| Ukraine | Davyd Sandomurskyi; Andrii Sokolov | 23.310 | 8 | 5.400 | 7 | 23.310 | 8 |

=== Semifinal ===
The results were as follows:

| Rank | Team | Group | Difficulty | Execution | Synchronization | Horizontal Displacement | Penalty | Total |
| Rank | Team | Group | Score | Score | Score | Score | Score | Total |
|---|---|---|---|---|---|---|---|---|
| Netherlands | Rikkert Veldhuizen; Jordy Mol | 1 | 5.200 | 1.950 | 4.960 | 2.700 | | 14.810 |
| France | Florestan Riou; Julian Chartier | 1 | 1.700 | 2.550 | 5.400 | 2.600 | | 12.250 |
| Portugal | Gabriel Albuquerque; Lucas Santos | 2 | 8.900 | 4.100 | 8.300 | 4.600 | | 25.900 |
| Germany | Caio Lauxtermann; Fabian Vogel | 2 | 6.900 | 3.100 | 7.760 | 3.700 | | 21.460 |

=== Final ===
The results were as follows:

| Rank | Team | Group | Difficulty | Execution | Synchronization | Horizontal Displacement | Penalty | Total |
| Rank | Team | Group | Score | Score | Score | Score | Score | Total |
Gold Medal Final
| 1st place, gold medalist(s) | Portugal | Gabriel Albuquerque; Lucas Santos | 10.600 | 4.850 | 10.940 | 5.400 | | 31.790 |
| 2nd place, silver medalist(s) | Netherlands | Rikkert Veldhuizen; Jordy Mol | 5.200 | 2.100 | 5.760 | 2.750 | | 15.810 |
Bronze Medal Final
| 3rd place, bronze medalist(s) | Germany | Caio Lauxtermann; Fabian Vogel | 16.300 | 7.700 | 19.100 | 9.350 | | 52.450 |
| 4 | France | Florestan Riou; Julian Chartier | 2.000 | 0.850 | 1.980 | 0.850 | | 5.660 |
