= Danil Mussabayev =

Kazakhstani trampoline gymnast

- Данил Мусабаев
- Alternative name: Danil Musabaev
- Born: 13 September 1998 (age 27) Karaganda, Kazakhstan

Gymnastics career
- Discipline: Trampoline gymnastics
- Country represented: Kazakhstan
- Club: Karaganda Specialised Youth Sports School of Gymnastics
- Head coach: Sergey Vertyankin
Medal record
Men's trampoline gymnastics
Representing Kazakhstan
Asian Games
Silver medal – second place	2022 Hangzhou	Individual

Danil Mussabayev (Russian: Данил Мусабаев; born 13 September 1998) is a Kazakhstani trampoline gymnast. He is the 2022 Asian Games individual silver medalist.

== Early life ==
Mussabayev was born on 13 September 1998 in Karaganda. His mother is Russian, and his father is Kazakh. He began trampoline gymnastics when he was four years old.

== Career ==
Mussabayev began competing in senior competitions in 2015. He placed 33rd at the Volladolid World Cup and 38th at the Mouilleron Le Captif World Cup. He then placed 110th at the 2015 World Championships.

Mussabayev won a bronze medal in synchronized trampoline with Pirmammad Aliyev at the 2016 Arosa World Cup. Mussabayev and Aliyev won their first World Cup gold medal at the 2017 Baku World Cup. As an individual, Mussabayev finished 13th in the individual semifinal at the 2017 World Championships. Mussabayev and Aliyev won a bronze medal at the 2018 Brescia World Cup and at the 2019 Minsk World Cup. They placed fourth at both the 2019 Baku and Khabarovsk World Cups. They qualified for the synchro final at the 2019 World Championships and finished eighth.

Despite qualifying for the final in last place, Mussabayev and Aliyev won a bronze medal at the 2020 Baku World Cup. Mussabayev won a silver medal in synchro with Roman Barkov at the 2021 Brescia World Cup. He did not qualify for the Tokyo Olympic Games. He competed at the 2021 World Championships and placed 56th in the individual qualification round.

Mussabayev won a bronze medal in the individual event at the 2022 Baku World Cup behind Belarusians Ivan Litvinovich and Andrei Builou. He then placed fifth at the Rimini World Cup. Then at the 2022 World Championships, Mussabayev and Aliyev qualified for the synchro final and finished sixth.

At the 2023 Baku World Cup, Mussabayev won the gold medals in the individual event and with his synchro partner Pirmammad Aliyev. At the Santarem World Cup, he qualified for the individual final and placed seventh. Mussabayev and Aliyev finished fourth in the synchro final at the Palm Beach World Cup. He won a silver medal at the 2022 Asian Games, held in 2023 due to the COVID-19 pandemic, behind China's Yan Langyu. This marked the first time Kazakhstan won an Asian Games medal in trampoline gymnastics. At the 2023 World Championships, he finished 21st in the individual qualification round.

Mussabayev won a silver medal with Pirmammad Aliyev at the 2024 Baku World Cup, and they placed fifth at the Cottbus World Cup. He qualified to represent Kazakhstan at the 2024 Summer Olympics through his results on the 2023–24 World Cup series.
