= Yan Langyu =

Chinese trampoline gymnast (born 1999)

- Born: 31 August 1999 (age 27) Weishan Town, Liling, Hunan, China

Gymnastics career
- Discipline: Trampoline gymnastics
- Country represented: China; (2018-present)
- Club: Hunan Province
- Head coach: Luo Dan
Medal record
Men's trampoline gymnastics
Representing China
Olympic Games
Bronze medal – third place	2024 Paris	Individual
World Championships
Gold medal – first place	2021 Baku	Individual
Gold medal – first place	2023 Birmingham	Individual
Gold medal – first place	2025 Pamplona	All-around team
Silver medal – second place	2019 Tokyo	Individual team
Silver medal – second place	2026 Nanjing	Individual team
Bronze medal – third place	2019 Tokyo	Mixed Team
Bronze medal – third place	2026 Nanjing	Individual
Asian Games
Gold medal – first place	2022 Hangzhou	Individual

Yan Langyu (simplified Chinese: 严浪宇; traditional Chinese: 嚴浪宇; pinyin: Yán Làngyǔ; born 31 August 1999) is a Chinese trampoline gymnast. He is the 2021 and 2023 World champion in individual trampoline. He is also the 2022 Asian Games champion and the 2024 Olympic bronze medalist. Additionally, he won two team medals at the 2019 World Championships.

== Early life ==
Yan was born on 31 August 1999 in Weishan Town, Liling. He began trampoline gymnastics in 2008 after being scouted by a coach who noticed his coordination, flexibility, and power. He was selected to join the Hunan Provincial team in 2012 and then the Chinese national team in 2018. He said he struggled with homesickness as a child due to a lot of traveling for training and competitions.

== Gymnastics career ==
Yan began competing in international competitions in 2019. At the 2019 Khabarovsk World Cup, he finished 13th in the individual event and 15th in the synchronized trampoline event. Then at the Valladolid World Cup, he finished sixth as an individual and 18th in the synchronized event. At the 2019 World Championships, he finished seventh in the qualification round for the individual event but did not advance due to the two-per-country rule. He won a silver medal in the men's trampoline team event and a bronze medal in the mixed team event.

Yan was selected as one of China's alternates for the 2020 Summer Olympics. With his teammate and the four-time defending World champion Gao Lei electing to not compete at the 2021 World Championships, Yan was able to win the World title and extend China's winning streak in the event dating back to 2006.

At the 2022 World Championships, Yan admitted he felt more pressure and nerves to defend his world title. In the qualification round, he was unable to finish his first routine, but he posted the highest score of the round in the second routine to advance. He was then eliminated in the semifinals after crashing his routine.

Yan missed a month of training in March 2023 due to lumbar strain. In July, he competed at the Santarem World Cup and won the gold medal by over a point ahead of teammate Wang Zisai. He then lost to Wang at the Coimbra World Cup. He withdrew from the final at the Palm Beach World Cup to give his teammate Li Yuming a chance to compete since Li had missed out on the other World Cup finals due to the two-per-country rule. He then competed at the Varna World Cup and defeated his teammate Wang. At the 2022 Asian Games, which were held in 2023 due to the COVID-19 pandemic, Yan won the gold medal in the final thanks to a high execution score of 17.000. He then won the gold medal at the 2023 World Championships in Birmingham by only 0.010 points ahead of Wang.

Yan began the 2024 season at the Baku World Cup where he lost to his teammate Wang by only 0.170 points. He then defeated Wang at the Cottbus World Cup by only 0.070 points. Yan was selected to represent China at the 2024 Summer Olympics, and he won the bronze medal in the individual event behind Ivan Litvinovich and Wang.

At the 2025 World Championships, Yan helped China win the gold medal in the all-around team event.
