= Wang Zisai =

Chinese trampoline gymnast (born 2006)

- Born: 18 June 2006 (age 20) Xuzhou, Jiangsu, China

Gymnastics career
- Discipline: Trampoline gymnastics
- Country represented: China; (2021 – present)
- Club: Jiangxu Province
- Head coach: Hu Junxiong
Medal record
Men's trampoline gymnastics
Representing China
Olympic Games
Silver medal – second place	2024 Paris	Individual
World Championships
Gold medal – first place	2025 Pamplona	Individual
Silver medal – second place	2023 Birmingham	Individual
Silver medal – second place	2026 Nanjing	Individual
Silver medal – second place	2026 Nanjing	Individual team
Silver medal – second place	2026 Nanjing	All-around team

Wang Zisai (simplified Chinese: 王梓赛; traditional Chinese: 王梓賽; pinyin: Wáng Zǐsài; born 18 June 2006) is a Chinese trampoline gymnast. He is the 2025 World champion in individual trampoline, and he is also the 2024 Olympic and 2023 World silver medalist.

== Early life ==
Wang was born on 18 June 2006 in Xuzhou and began trampoline gymnastics when he was four years old. He joined the Jiangxu provincial team in 2015 and was selected to join the national trampoline team in December 2021.

== Gymnastics career ==
Wang competed at the 2022 World Age Group Competitions in Sofia and won the silver medal in the individual event for the 15-16 age group behind Portugal's Gabriel Albuquerque.

Wang made his senior international debut at the 2023 Santarem World Cup, winning the silver medal behind teammate Yan Langyu. He then competed at the Coimbra World Cup despite a flare-up in his right ankle, and he won the gold medal with the highest difficulty score of the competition. He once again won the gold medal at the Palm Beach World Cup with the highest difficulty and execution scores of the field. Wang then won the silver medal behind Yan at the Varna World Cup. He was the overall winner of the 2023 FIG World Cup series. He then competed at the 2022 Asian Games, which were held in 2023 due to the COVID-19 pandemic, and only finished eighth in the final despite qualifying in first place. He ended the season at the 2023 World Championships in Birmingham with a silver medal behind Yan by only 0.010 points.

Wang began the 2024 season at the Baku World Cup where he won the gold medal by only 0.17 points ahead of Yan. He then lost to Yan at the Cottbus World Cup by only 0.07 points. Wang represented China at the 2024 Summer Olympics, and he won the silver medal in the individual event behind Ivan Litvinovich and ahead of Yan. He noted after the competition that he was happy with the results and his performance, and he is aiming to compete at the 2028 Summer Olympics.

At the 2025 World Championships, Wang won the gold medal in the individual event by more than a point and a half ahead of Ruben Padilla.
