= Caio Lauxtermann =

American-born German trampoline gymnast

Personal information
- Nationality: German
- Born: 4 April 2003 (age 23) California, United States

Sport
- Sport: Trampolining
Medal record
Men's trampoline gymnastics
Representing Germany
World Games
Bronze medal – third place	2025 Chengdu	Synchro
World Championships
Gold medal – first place	2023 Birmingham	Synchro
European Championships
Silver medal – second place	2024 Guimarães	Team
Bronze medal – third place	2021 Sochi	Synchro

Caio Lauxtermann (born 4 April 2003) is an American-born German trampoline gymnast.

Lauxtermann won a gold medal at the 2023 Trampoline Gymnastics World Championships and a bronze medal at the 2021 European Trampoline Gymnastics Championships, both in the synchronized event.

Lauxtermann's coach is Katarina Prokesova.
