= Weishan Town, Liling =

Town in Liling, Hunan, China

Coordinates: 27.7194°N 113.5190°E

Weishan (Chinese: 沩山镇; pinyin: Wéishān Zhèn) is a town of Liling City in Hunan Province, China. The town was established by merging the previous Dongbao Township (东堡乡) on November 26, 2015. As of 2015, the town had a population of 24,000 and an area of 86.03 square kilometers.

== Cityscape ==
The township is divided into 16 villages, which include the following areas: Zhuhu Village, Zhangduan Village, Dongbao Village, Xin'an Village, Tubu Village, Datang'ao Village, Weishan Village, Wangxianqiao Village, Shanfeng Village, Zhonggu Village, Loushuiping Village, Dalin Village, Laoyashan Village, Quanyuan Village, Chizhu Village, and Dongkeng Village.
