= Basketball at the 2024 Summer Olympics – Men's 3x3 tournament =

Tournament details
- Host country: France
- City: Paris
- Dates: 30 July – 5 August
- Teams: 8 (from 3 confederations)
- Venue: 1 (in 1 host city)

Final positions
- Champions: Netherlands (1st title)
- Runners-up: France
- Third place: Lithuania
- Fourth place: Latvia

Tournament statistics
- MVP: (Netherlands) Worthy de Jong

The 2024 Summer Olympics men's 3x3 basketball tournament in Paris, France, began on 30 July and ended on 5 August 2024. All games were played at the Place de la Concorde. It was the second time the 3x3 basketball men's event was held at the Olympic Games.

The Netherlands defeated France 18–17 in a closely contested final to win the gold medal, while France took home the silver in front of a home crowd. In the battle for bronze, Lithuania overcame Latvia, who were the top seed from the pool stage, to secure the third-place finish.

== Competition format ==
The eight teams played a round robin. The teams placed first and second qualified for the semifinals. The teams three to six played a playoff. After that, a knockout system was used. Additionally, the games could be won in two ways: by being the first team to score 21 points or having the highest score through 10 minutes.

== Qualification ==
Eight teams participated in the men's basketball tournament, with each National Olympic Committee (NOC) sending a roster of three players and a substitute. The qualification process consisted of four phases one based in the FIBA ranking list and three olympic qualifiers:

- The first phase gave three quota places to the highest ranked NOCs on the FIBA ranking list of 1 November. However, not more than two NOCs from a continent could qualify in this phase. Also a quota place was guaranteed to the host nation for only one of the 3x3 events which was given to the women's 3x3 tournament at the 2024 Summer Olympics.
- The second phase consisted of the first of three FIBA Universality-driven Olympic tournament where one quota place was awarded to the highest positioned NOC were the seven highest ranked NOCs that have not been qualified yet as well as France (for being the host nation) participated.
- The third phase was an Olympic tournament which awarded one place to the highest positioned team were the highest placed NOC's of each continental tournament and the hosts of both the tournament and the olympics, if not qualified, participated.
- The fourth phase saw the sixteen highest-ranked eligible NOCs based on the FIBA global standings, including the tournament host and host nation France, if not yet qualified, participated in another Olympic qualifier with the top three securing the remaining berths for Paris 2024.

Qualification method	Date	Venue	Berths	Qualified team
Host nation	—N/a	—N/a	0	—N/a
FIBA 3x3 World Ranking	1 November 2023	—N/a	3	Serbia; United States; China
2024 FIBA Universality Olympic Qualifying Tournament 1	12–14 April 2024	Hong Kong	1	Latvia
2024 FIBA Universality Olympic Qualifying Tournament 2	3–5 May 2024	(Japan) Utsunomiya	1	Netherlands
2024 FIBA Olympic Qualifying Tournament	16–19 May 2024	(Hungary) Debrecen	3	France; Lithuania; Poland
Total			8	

== Competition schedule ==
Legend
G	Group stage	¼	Quarter-finals	½	Semi-finals	B	Bronze medal match	F	Gold medal match

Tue 30	Wed 31	Thu 1	Fri 2	Sat 3	Sun 4		Mon 5		
G	G	G	G		G	¼	½	B	F

== Rosters ==
Team	Players			
Serbia	Marko Branković	Strahinja Stojačić	Dejan Majstorović	Mihailo Vasić
United States	Jimmer Fredette	Canyon Barry	Kareem Maddox	Dylan Travis
Lithuania	Šarūnas Vingelis	Gintautas Matulis	Aurelijus Pukelis	Evaldas Džiaugys
China	Zhang Ning	Lu Wenbo	Zhao Jiaren	Zhu Yuanbo
Netherlands	Jan Driessen	Dimeo van der Horst	Arvin Slagter	Worthy de Jong
France	Lucas Dussoulier	Timothé Vergiat	Jules Rambaut	Franck Seguela
Latvia	Nauris Miezis	Kārlis Lasmanis	Francis Lācis	Zigmārs Raimo
Poland	Filip Matczak	Michał Sokołowski	Przemysław Zamojski	Adrian Bogucki

== Referees ==
The following referees were selected for the tournament.

- (China) Shi Qirong
- (France) Najib Chajiddine
- (Hong Kong) Edmond Ho
- (Hungary) Brigitta Csabai-Kaskötő
- (Poland) Marek Maliszewski
- (Romania) Vlad Ghizdareanu
- (Serbia) Jasmina Juras
- (South Korea) Kim Ga-in
- (Switzerland) Eric Bertrand
- (Switzerland) Markos Michaelides
- (United States) Deanna Jackson

== Pool ==
=== Standings ===
Pos	Team	Pld	W	L	PF	PA	PD	Qualification
1	Latvia	7	7	0	147	103	+44	Semifinals
2	Netherlands	7	5	2	133	112	+21	Semifinals
3	Lithuania	7	4 (Note: Lithuania 20–18 Serbia)	3	134	125	+9	Play-ins
4	Serbia	7	4	3	129	123	+6	Play-ins
5	France (H)	7	3	4	131	132	−1	Play-ins
6	Poland	7	2 (Note: United States 17–19 Poland)	5	116	139	−23	Play-ins
7	United States	7	2	5	116	138	−22	
8	China	7	1	6	107	141	−34	

Source: FIBA
Rules for classification: 1) Wins; 2) Head-to-head record; 3) Points scored.
(H) Hosts

=== Results ===
All times are local (UTC+2).

30 July 2024
18:35
v

Boxscore

Latvia	21–14	Lithuania
Pts: Miezis 9		Pts: Pukelis 8

Place de la Concorde, Paris
Referees: Marek Maliszewski (POL), Jasmina Juras (SRB)

30 July 2024
19:05
v

Boxscore

China	16–21	Netherlands
Pts: Zhang 7		Pts: De Jong 9

Place de la Concorde, Paris
Referees: Markos Michaelides (SUI), Najib Chajiddine (FRA)

30 July 2024
22:05
v

Boxscore

Poland	19–21	France
Pts: Bogucki, Zamojski 6		Pts: Dussoulier 9

Place de la Concorde, Paris
Referees: Brigitta Csabai-Kaskötő (HUN), Vlad Ghizdareanu (ROU)

30 July 2024
22:35
v

Boxscore

Serbia	22–14	United States
Pts: Branković 8		Pts: Maddox 6

Place de la Concorde, Paris
Referees: Vlad Ghizdareanu (ROU), Edmond Ho (HKG)

31 July 2024
18:35
v

Boxscore

Latvia	21–12	Netherlands
Pts: Lasmanis 8		Pts: De Jong 7

Place de la Concorde, Paris
Referees: Brigitta Csabai-Kaskötő (HUN), Deanna Jackson (USA)

31 July 2024
19:05
v

Boxscore

Serbia	15–21	China
Pts: Majstorović 7		Pts: Zhang 11

Place de la Concorde, Paris
Referees: Markos Michaelides (SUI), Dorothy Okatch (BOT)

31 July 2024
22:05
v

Boxscore

Lithuania	20–21	France
Pts: Džiaugys, Pukelis 7		Pts: Rambaut 9

Place de la Concorde, Paris
Referees: Edmond Ho (HKG), Shi Qirong (CHN)

31 July 2024
22:35
v

Boxscore

United States	17–19	Poland
Pts: Barry, Travis 6		Pts: Bogucki 7

Place de la Concorde, Paris
Referees: Jasmina Juras (SRB), Vlad Ghizdareanu (ROU)

1 August 2024
10:05
v

Boxscore

Netherlands	19–21	Serbia
Pts: Van der Horst, De Jong 8		Pts: Branković 9

Place de la Concorde, Paris
Referees: Markos Michaelides (SUI), Brigitta Csabai-Kaskötő (HUN)

1 August 2024
10:35
v

Boxscore

China	8–22	Latvia
Pts: Zhang 6		Pts: Lācis 8

Place de la Concorde, Paris
Referees: Deanna Jackson (USA), Jasmina Juras (SRB)

1 August 2024
13:25
v

Boxscore

Lithuania	21–12	Poland
Pts: Džiaugys 10		Pts: Bogucki 6

Place de la Concorde, Paris
Referees: Markos Michaelides (SUI), Deanna Jackson (USA)

1 August 2024
14:05
v

Boxscore

Netherlands	20–13	France
Pts: van der Horst 8		Pts: Dussoulier 6

Place de la Concorde, Paris
Referees: Jasmina Juras (SRB), Brigitta Csabai-Kaskötő (HUN)

1 August 2024
19:05
v

Boxscore

United States	18–20	Lithuania
Pts: Barry 9		Pts: Pukelis 7

Place de la Concorde, Paris
Referees: Edmond Ho (HKG), Najib Chajiddine (FRA)

1 August 2024
19:35
v

Boxscore

China	17–22	Poland
Pts: Zhang 9		Pts: Zamojski 9

Place de la Concorde, Paris
Referees: Najib Chajiddine (FRA), Vlad Ghizdareanu (ROU)

1 August 2024
22:35
v

Boxscore

Serbia	19–16	France
Pts: Majstorović 9		Pts: Seguela 7

Place de la Concorde, Paris
Referees: Edmond Ho (HKG), Marek Maliszewski (POL)

1 August 2024
23:05
v

Boxscore

United States	19–21	Latvia
Pts: Barry 10		Pts: Miezis 10

Place de la Concorde, Paris
Referees: Najib Chajiddine (FRA), Vlad Ghizdareanu (ROU)

2 August 2024
10:05
v

Boxscore

Lithuania	21–16	China
Pts: Džiaugys 9		Pts: Zhao 6

Place de la Concorde, Paris
Referees: Marek Maliszewski (POL), Brigitta Csabai-Kaskötő (HUN)

2 August 2024
10:35
v

Boxscore

Poland	17–21	Netherlands
Pts: Zamojski 8		Pts: three players 6

Place de la Concorde, Paris
Referees: Deanna Jackson (USA), Jasmina Juras (SRB)

2 August 2024
13:25
v

Boxscore

Netherlands	19–18	Lithuania
Pts: De Jong 6		Pts: Pukelis 7

Place de la Concorde, Paris
Referees: Deanna Jackson (USA), Jasmina Juras (SRB)

2 August 2024
14:05
v

Boxscore

France	20–22	Latvia
Pts: Seguela 10		Pts: Miezis 10

Place de la Concorde, Paris
Referees: Brigitta Csabai-Kaskötő (HUN), Marek Maliszewski (POL)

2 August 2024
18:35
v

Boxscore

France	19–21	United States
Pts: Seguela 7		Pts: Barry 16

Place de la Concorde, Paris
Referees: Shi Qirong (CHN), Edmond Ho (HKG)

2 August 2024
19:05
v

Boxscore

Latvia	21–14	Serbia
Pts: Lācis, Lasmanis 8		Pts: Majstorović 7

Place de la Concorde, Paris
Referees: Markos Michaelides (SUI), Vlad Ghizdareanu (ROU)

2 August 2024
22:05
v

Boxscore

Serbia	21–12	Poland
Pts: Majstorović 7		Pts: Bogucki 6

Place de la Concorde, Paris
Referees: Edmond Ho (HKG), Najib Chajiddine (FRA)

2 August 2024
22:35
v

Boxscore

China	17–21	United States
Pts: Zhao 9		Pts: Barry 14

Place de la Concorde, Paris
Referees: Kim Ga-in (KOR), Vlad Ghizdareanu (ROU)

4 August 2024
17:30
v

Boxscore

France	21–12	China
Pts: Dussoulier, Rambaut 6		Pts: Zhang 4

Place de la Concorde, Paris
Referees: Jasmina Juras (SRB), Vlad Ghizdareanu (ROU)

4 August 2024
18:00
v

Boxscore

Poland	16–22	Latvia
Pts: Sokołowski 6		Pts: Miezis 13

Place de la Concorde, Paris
Referees: Brigitta Csabai-Kaskötő (HUN), Edmond Ho (HKG)

4 August 2024
18:35
v

Boxscore

Lithuania	20–18	Serbia
Pts: Pukelis 10		Pts: Majstorović 10

Place de la Concorde, Paris
Referees: Markos Michaelides (SUI), Vlad Ghizdareanu (ROU)

4 August 2024
19:05
v

Boxscore

United States	6–21	Netherlands
Pts: three players 2		Pts: De Jong 11

Place de la Concorde, Paris
Referees: Edmond Ho (HKG), Jasmina Juras (SRB)

== Knockout stage ==
=== Bracket ===
Play-in
4 August
Serbia	19
France	22
4 August
Lithuania	21
Poland	15

Semifinals
5 August
Latvia	14
France	21
5 August
Netherlands	20
Lithuania	9

Gold medal
5 August
France	17
Netherlands (OT)	18
Bronze medal
5 August
Latvia	18
Lithuania	21

=== Play-in ===
4 August 2024
21:30
v

Boxscore

Lithuania	21–15	Poland
Pts: Džiaugys, Vingelis 9		Pts: Sokołowski 7

Place de la Concorde, Paris
Referees: Jasmina Juras (SRB), Najib Chajiddine (FRA)

4 August 2024
22:05
v

Boxscore

Serbia	19–22	France
Pts: Stojačić 8		Pts: Rambaut 8

Place de la Concorde, Paris
Referees: Vlad Ghizdareanu (ROU), Deanna Jackson (USA)

=== Semifinals ===
5 August 2024
18:00
v

Boxscore

Netherlands	20–9	Lithuania
Pts: De Jong 8		Pts: Pukelis 4

Place de la Concorde, Paris
Referees: Markos Michaelides (SUI), Deanna Jackson (USA)

5 August 2024
19:00
v

Boxscore

Latvia	14–21	France
Pts: Lasmanis 11		Pts: Dussoulier 9

Place de la Concorde, Paris
Referees: Brigitta Csabai-Kaskötő (HUN), Edmond Ho (HKG)

=== Bronze medal game ===
5 August 2024
21:30
v

Boxscore

Latvia	18–21	Lithuania
Pts: Lasmanis 9		Pts: Vingelis 9

Place de la Concorde, Paris
Referees: Markos Michaelides (SUI), Deanna Jackson (USA)

=== Gold medal game ===
5 August 2024
22:30
v

Report

France	17–18 (OT)	Netherlands
Pts: Dussoulier, Seguela 5		Pts: De Jong 7

Place de la Concorde, Paris
Referees: Vlad Ghizdareanu (ROU), Jasmina Juras (SRB)

== Final ranking ==
Pos	Team	Pld	W	L
1st place, gold medalist(s)	Netherlands	9	7	2
2nd place, silver medalist(s)	France	10	5	5
3rd place, bronze medalist(s)	Lithuania	10	6	4
4	Latvia	9	7	2
5	Serbia	8	4	4
6	Poland	8	2	6
7	United States	7	2	5
8	China	7	1	6

Source: Olympics

== Statistics and awards ==
=== Points leaders ===
Rank	Name	Points
1	(Latvia) Kārlis Lasmanis	67
2	(Netherlands) Worthy de Jong	65
3	(Lithuania) Aurelijus Pukelis	63
4	(Latvia) Nauris Miezis	59
4	(United States) Canyon Barry	59

=== Awards ===
The awards were announced on 7 August 2024.

All-Star team
(Netherlands) Worthy de Jong
(France) Lucas Dussoulier
(Lithuania) Aurelijus Pukelis
MVP
(Netherlands) Worthy de Jong
