= Serbia at the 2024 Summer Olympics =

- IOC code: SRB
- NOC: Olympic Committee of Serbia
- Website: www.oks.org.rs (in Serbian)

in Paris, France 26 July 2024 – 11 August 2024
- Competitors: 112 (69 men and 43 women) in 15 sports
- Flag bearers (opening): Dušan Mandić & Maja Ognjenović
- Flag bearers (closing): Zorana Arunović & Damir Mikec
- Officials: Sonja Vasić, chef de mission
- Medals Ranked 27th: Gold 3 Silver 1 Bronze 1 Total 5

Summer Olympics appearances (overview)
- 1912; 1920–2004; 2008; 2012; 2016; 2020; 2024

Other related appearances
- Yugoslavia (1920–1992 W); Independent Olympic Participants (1992 S); Serbia and Montenegro (1996–2006)

Serbia competed at the 2024 Summer Olympics in Paris from 26 July to 11 August 2024. It was the nation's sixth appearance at the Summer Olympics as an independent nation.

== Medalists ==
Medal	Name	Sport	Event	Date
Gold	Zorana Arunović; Damir Mikec	Shooting	Mixed 10 m air pistol team	30 July
Gold	Novak Djokovic	Tennis	Men's singles	4 August
Gold	Serbia men's national water polo team: Radoslav Filipović; Dušan Mandić; Strahinja Rašović; Sava Ranđelović; Miloš Ćuk; Nikola Dedović; Radomir Drašović; Nikola Jakšić; Nemanja Ubović; Nemanja Vico; Petar Jakšić; Viktor Rašović; Vladimir Mišović	Water polo	Men's tournament	11 August
Silver	Aleksandra Perišić	Taekwondo	Women's –67 kg	9 August
Bronze	Serbia men's national basketball team: Uroš Plavšić; Filip Petrušev; Nikola Jović; Bogdan Bogdanović; Vanja Marinković; Ognjen Dobrić; Nikola Jokić; Vasilije Micić; Marko Gudurić; Dejan Davidovac; Aleksa Avramović; Nikola Milutinov	Basketball	Men's tournament	10 August

== Competitors ==
The following is the list of number of competitors in the Games. Note that alternate athletes (AP) are not counted:

Sport	Men	Women	Total
Athletics	2	4	6
Basketball	16	12	28
Boxing	1	2	3
Canoeing	4	4	8
Cycling	1	1	2
Judo	3	3	6
Rowing	2	1	3
Shooting	2	1	3
Swimming	4	1	5
Table tennis	0	1	1
Taekwondo	2	1	3
Tennis	2	0	2
Volleyball	12	12	24
Water polo	13	0	13
Wrestling	5	0	5
Total	69	43	112

== Athletics ==
Serbian track and field athletes achieved the entry standards for the Games, either by passing the direct qualifying mark (or time for track and road races) or by world ranking, in the following events (a maximum of 3 athletes each):

Key

- Note–Ranks given for track events are within the athlete's heat only
- Q = Qualified for the next round
- q = Qualified for the next round as a fastest loser or, in field events, by position without achieving the qualifying target
- NR = National record
- N/A = Round not applicable for the event
- Bye = Athlete not required to compete in round

Track & road events

Athlete	Event	Heat		Final	
Athlete	Event	Time	Rank	Time	Rank
Elzan Bibić	Men's 5000 m	14:14.46	32	Did not advance	

Field events

Athlete	Event	Qualification		Final	
Athlete	Event	Distance	Position	Distance	Position
Armin Sinančević	Men's shot put	19.31	24	Did not advance	
Angelina Topić	Women's high jump	1.92	12 q	DNS	–
Milica Gardašević	Women's long jump	6.48	18	Did not advance	
Ivana Španović	Women's long jump	6.51	16	Did not advance	
Adriana Vilagoš	Women's javelin throw	60.49	13	Did not advance	

== Basketball ==
=== 5×5 basketball ===
Summary

Team	Event	Group stage				Quarterfinal	Semifinal	Final / BM	
Team	Event	Opposition Score	Opposition Score	Opposition Score	Rank	Opposition Score	Opposition Score	Opposition Score	Rank
Serbia men's	Men's tournament	United States; L 84–110	Puerto Rico; W 107–66	South Sudan; W 96–85	2 QF	Australia; W 95–90	United States; L 91–95	Germany; W 93–83	3rd place, bronze medalist(s)
Serbia women's	Women's tournament	Puerto Rico; W 58–55	China; W 81–59	Spain; L 62–70	2 QF	Australia; L 67–85	Did not advance		6

==== Men's tournament ====
Serbia men's basketball team qualified for the Games by reaching the semifinal stage and securing an outright berth as one of two highest-ranked squads from Europe at the 2023 FIBA Basketball World Cup in Philippines, Japan & Indonesia.

Team roster

Serbia men's national basketball team – 2024 Summer Olympics roster
Players
Coaches

Pos.	No.	Name	Age – Date of birth	Height	Club	Ctr.
C	0	Uroš Plavšić	25 – 22 December 1998	2.16 m (7 ft 1 in)	Crvena zvezda	(Serbia)
F/C	3	Filip Petrušev	24 – 15 April 2000	2.11 m (6 ft 11 in)	Olympiacos	(Greece)
PF	5	Nikola Jović	21 – 9 June 2003	2.08 m (6 ft 10 in)	Miami Heat	(United States)
SG	7	Bogdan Bogdanović (C)	31 – 18 August 1992	1.96 m (6 ft 5 in)	Atlanta Hawks	(United States)
SG	9	Vanja Marinković	27 – 9 January 1997	1.98 m (6 ft 6 in)	Partizan	(Serbia)
SF	13	Ognjen Dobrić	29 – 27 October 1994	2.00 m (6 ft 7 in)	Crvena zvezda	(Serbia)
C	15	Nikola Jokić	29 – 19 February 1995	2.11 m (6 ft 11 in)	Denver Nuggets	(United States)
PG	22	Vasilije Micić	30 – 13 January 1994	1.95 m (6 ft 5 in)	Charlotte Hornets	(United States)
G/F	23	Marko Gudurić	29 – 8 March 1995	1.96 m (6 ft 5 in)	Fenerbahçe	(Turkey)
F	27	Dejan Davidovac	29 – 17 January 1995	2.03 m (6 ft 8 in)	Crvena zvezda	(Serbia)
PG	30	Aleksa Avramović	29 – 25 October 1994	1.92 m (6 ft 4 in)	Partizan	(Serbia)
C	33	Nikola Milutinov	29 – 30 December 1994	2.13 m (7 ft 0 in)	Olympiacos	(Greece)

Head coach

- (Serbia) Svetislav Pešić

Assistant coach(es)

- (Serbia) Oliver Kostić
- (Serbia) Saša Kosović
- (Serbia) Marko Marinović
- (Serbia) Ognjen Stojaković
- (Serbia) Nenad Jakovljević

Legend

- (C) Team captain
- Club – describes last
  club before the tournament
- Age – describes age
  on 27 July 2024

Roster

Group play

Pos	Team	Pld	W	L	PF	PA	PD	Pts	Qualification
1	United States	3	3	0	317	253	+64	6	Quarterfinals
2	Serbia	3	2	1	287	261	+26	5	Quarterfinals
3	South Sudan	3	1	2	261	278	−17	4	
4	Puerto Rico	3	0	3	228	301	−73	3	

Source: FIBA
Rules for classification: 1) classification points; 2) head-to-head results; 3) head-to-head game points difference; 4) head-to-head number of game points scored.

28 July 2024
17:15

Boxscore

Serbia	84–110	United States
Scoring by quarter: 20–25, 29–33, 16–26, 19–26
Pts: Jokić 20; Rebs: Bogdanović 6 Asts: Jokić 8		Pts: Durant 23; Rebs: Davis 8 Asts: James 9

Stade Pierre-Mauroy, Lille
Attendance: 27,328
Referees: Yohan Rosso (FRA), Julio Anaya (PAN), Mārtiņš Kozlovskis (LAT)

31 July 2024
17:15

Boxscore

Puerto Rico	66–107	Serbia
Scoring by quarter: 12–24, 23–28, 16–27, 15–28
Pts: Ortiz 19; Rebs: Ortiz 6 Asts: Howard, Waters 3		Pts: Petrušev 15; Rebs: Jokić 15; Asts: Jokić 9

Stade Pierre-Mauroy, Lille
Attendance: 17,882
Referees: Julio Anaya (PAN), Juan Fernández (ARG), Boris Krejić (SLO)

3 August 2024
21:00

Boxscore

Serbia	96–85	South Sudan
Scoring by quarter: 23–22, 24–22, 25–23, 24–18
Pts: Bogdanović 30; Rebs: Jokić 13; Asts: Bogdanović 8		Pts: Jones, Shayok 17; Rebs: Gabriel 8 Asts: Jones 10

Stade Pierre-Mauroy, Lille
Attendance: 20,916
Referees: Ademir Zurapović (BIH), Yohan Rosso (FRA), Juan Fernández (ARG)

Quarterfinals

6 August 2024
14:30

Boxscore

Serbia	95–90 (OT)	Australia
Scoring by quarter: 17–31, 25–23, 25–11, 15–17, Overtime: 13–8
Pts: Jokić 21; Rebs: Jokić 14; Asts: Jokić 9		Pts: Mills 26; Rebs: Landale, Magnay 6 Asts: Exum 5

Accor Arena, Paris
Attendance: 12,317
Referees: Yohan Rosso (FRA), Julio Anaya (PAN), Wojciech Liszka (POL)

Semifinals

8 August 2024
21:00

Boxscore

United States	95–91	Serbia
Scoring by quarter: 23–31, 20–23, 20–22, 32–15
Pts: Curry 36; Rebs: James 12; Asts: James 10		Pts: Bogdanović 20; Rebs: three players 5 Asts: Jokić 11

Accor Arena, Paris
Attendance: 12,213
Referees: Ademir Zurapović (BIH), Julio Anaya (PAN), Mārtiņš Kozlovskis (LAT)

Bronze medal game

10 August 2024
11:00

Boxscore

Germany	83–93	Serbia
Scoring by quarter: 21–30, 17–16, 25–26, 20–21
Pts: F. Wagner 18; Rebs: F. Wagner 9 Asts: Schröder, Weiler-Babb 6		Pts: Jokić, Micić 19; Rebs: Jokić 12; Asts: Jokić 11

Accor Arena, Paris
Attendance: 12,406
Referees: Matthew Kallio (CAN), Yohan Rosso (FRA), Johnny Batista (PUR)

==== Women's tournament ====
Serbia women's national basketball team qualified for the Games by placing in the top three at the Olympic Qualifying Tournament in Belém, Brazil.

Team roster

The roster was announced on 24 July 2024.

Serbia women's national basketball team – 2024 Summer Olympics roster
Players
Coaches

Pos.	No.	Name	Age – Date of birth	Height	Club	Ctr.
PF	1	Ivana Raca	24 – 10 September 1999	1.88 m (6 ft 2 in)	Dinamo Sassari	(Italy)
SG	6	Saša Čađo	35 – 13 July 1989	1.78 m (5 ft 10 in)	CCC Polkowice	(Poland)
SG	8	Nevena Jovanović	34 – 30 June 1990	1.79 m (5 ft 10 in)	Nika Syktyvkar	(Russia)
PG	12	Yvonne Anderson	34 – 8 March 1990	1.75 m (5 ft 9 in)	Fenerbahçe	(Turkey)
C	14	Dragana Stanković	29 – 18 January 1995	1.95 m (6 ft 5 in)	Reyer Venezia	(Italy)
SF	17	Jovana Nogić	26 – 17 December 1997	1.81 m (5 ft 11 in)	Beşiktaş	(Turkey)
SF	25	Maša Janković	24 – 1 February 2000	1.87 m (6 ft 2 in)	CB Avenida	(Spain)
PG	30	Aleksandra Katanić	27 – 18 May 1997	1.72 m (5 ft 8 in)	Ormanspor	(Turkey)
PF	32	Angela Dugalić	22 – 29 December 2001	1.93 m (6 ft 4 in)	UCLA Bruins	(United States)
C	33	Tina Krajišnik (C)	33 – 12 January 1991	1.90 m (6 ft 3 in)	UMMC Ekaterinburg	(Russia)
PF	51	Mina Đorđević	25 – 23 February 1999	1.86 m (6 ft 1 in)	Emlak Konut SK	(Turkey)
G	66	Nadija Smailbegović	23 – 5 April 2001	1.77 m (5 ft 10 in)	PEAC-Pécs	(Hungary)

Head coach

- (Serbia) Marina Maljković

Assistant coach(es)

- (North Macedonia) Jelena Antić
- (Serbia) Filip Benčić
- (Serbia) Dajana Butulija
- (Serbia) Ljubica Drljača
- (Serbia) Danielle Page

Legend

- (C) Team captain
- Club – describes last
  club before the tournament
- Age – describes age
  on 28 July 2024

Roster

Group play

Pos	Team	Pld	W	L	PF	PA	PD	Pts	Qualification
1	Spain	3	3	0	223	213	+10	6	Quarterfinals
2	Serbia	3	2	1	201	184	+17	5	Quarterfinals
3	China	3	1	2	228	229	−1	4	
4	Puerto Rico	3	0	3	175	201	−26	3	

Source: FIBA
Rules for classification: 1) classification points; 2) head-to-head results; 3) head-to-head game points difference; 4) head-to-head number of game points scored.

28 July 2024
21:00

Boxscore

Serbia	58–55	Puerto Rico
Scoring by quarter: 23–15, 20–11, 12–10, 3–19
Pts: Stanković 15; Rebs: Stanković 10; Asts: Anderson 8		Pts: San Antonio 11; Rebs: three players 6 Asts: Rosado 7

Stade Pierre-Mauroy, Lille
Attendance: 15,324
Referees: Maj Forsberg (DEN), James Boyer (AUS), Yann Davidson (MAD)

31 July 2024
13:30

Boxscore

China	59–81	Serbia
Scoring by quarter: 17–23, 22–22, 11–17, 9–19
Pts: Han, Wang 11; Rebs: Li Yue. 11; Asts: Wang, Yang L. 5		Pts: Anderson 15; Rebs: Krajišnik 11; Asts: Anderson 6

Stade Pierre-Mauroy, Lille
Attendance: 23,942
Referees: Martin Vulić (CRO), Maj Forsberg (DEN), James Boyer (AUS)

3 August 2024
13:30

Boxscore

Serbia	62–70	Spain
Scoring by quarter: 13–16, 15–21, 10–18, 24–15
Pts: Anderson 18; Rebs: Stanković 5 Asts: Anderson 7		Pts: Conde 15; Rebs: Gustafson 9 Asts: Gil 7

Stade Pierre-Mauroy, Lille
Attendance: 26,595
Referees: Takaki Kato (JPN), Viola Györgyi (NOR), Yann Davidson (MAD)

Quarterfinals

7 August 2024
11:00

Boxscore

Serbia	67–85	Australia
Scoring by quarter: 19–26, 13–22, 16–24, 19–13
Pts: Nogić 17; Rebs: Raca 7 Asts: Anderson, Nogić 5		Pts: Smith 22; Rebs: Smith 13; Asts: Melbourne 5

Accor Arena, Paris
Attendance: 12,337
Referees: Martin Vulić (CRO), Ariadna Chueca (ESP), Yevgeniy Mikheyev (KAZ)

=== 3×3 basketball ===
Summary

Team	Event	Group stage								Quarterfinal	Semifinal	Final / BM	
Team	Event	Opposition Score	Opposition Score	Opposition Score	Opposition Score	Opposition Score	Opposition Score	Opposition Score	Rank	Opposition Score	Opposition Score	Opposition Score	Rank
Serbia men's	Men's tournament	United States; W 22–14	China; L 15–21	Netherlands; W 21–19	France; W 19–16	Latvia; L 14–21	Poland; W 21–12	Lithuania; L 18–20	4 QF	France; L 19–22	Did not advance		5

==== Men's tournament ====
Serbia men's national 3x3 team qualified directly for the Games by securing an outright berth, as one of the three highest-ranked squads, in the men's category of the FIBA rankings.

Team roster

The roster was announced on 8 July 2024.

Serbia men's national 3x3 team – 2024 Summer Olympics roster
Players
Coaches

Pos.	No.	Name	Age – Date of birth	Height	Club	Ctr.
F	2	Marko Branković	29 – August 12, 1994	2.00 m (6 ft 7 in)	Ub Huishan NE	(Serbia)
G	3	Strahinja Stojačić (C)	32 – July 15, 1992	1.98 m (6 ft 6 in)	Ub Huishan NE	(Serbia)
G/F	8	Dejan Majstorović	36 – April 22, 1988	2.00 m (6 ft 7 in)	Ub Huishan NE	(Serbia)
F	9	Mihailo Vasić	31 – July 20, 1993	1.99 m (6 ft 6 in)	Liman	(Serbia)

Head coach

- (Serbia) Marko Ždero

Assistant coach(es)

- (Serbia) Danilo Lukić

Legend

- (C) Team captain
- Age – describes age
  on 30 July 2024

Group play

Pos	Team	Pld	W	L	PF	PA	PD	Qualification
1	Latvia	7	7	0	147	103	+44	Semifinals
2	Netherlands	7	5	2	133	112	+21	Semifinals
3	Lithuania	7	4 (Note: Lithuania 20–18 Serbia)	3	134	125	+9	Play-ins
4	Serbia	7	4	3	129	123	+6	Play-ins
5	France (H)	7	3	4	131	132	−1	Play-ins
6	Poland	7	2 (Note: United States 17–19 Poland)	5	116	139	−23	Play-ins
7	United States	7	2	5	116	138	−22	
8	China	7	1	6	107	141	−34	

Source: FIBA
Rules for classification: 1) Wins; 2) Head-to-head record; 3) Points scored.
(H) Hosts
Notes:

30 July 2024
22:35
v

Boxscore

Serbia	22–14	United States
Pts: Branković 8		Pts: Maddox 6

Place de la Concorde, Paris
Referees: Vlad Ghizdareanu (ROU), Edmond Ho (HKG)

31 July 2024
19:05
v

Boxscore

Serbia	15–21	China
Pts: Majstorović 7		Pts: Zhang 11

Place de la Concorde, Paris
Referees: Markos Michaelides (SUI), Dorothy Okatch (BOT)

1 August 2024
10:05
v

Boxscore

Netherlands	19–21	Serbia
Pts: Van der Horst, De Jong 8		Pts: Branković 9

Place de la Concorde, Paris
Referees: Markos Michaelides (SUI), Brigitta Csabai-Kaskötő (HUN)

1 August 2024
22:35
v

Boxscore

Serbia	19–16	France
Pts: Majstorović 9		Pts: Seguela 7

Place de la Concorde, Paris
Referees: Edmond Ho (HKG), Marek Maliszewski (POL)

2 August 2024
19:05
v

Boxscore

Latvia	21–14	Serbia
Pts: Lācis, Lasmanis 8		Pts: Majstorović 7

Place de la Concorde, Paris
Referees: Markos Michaelides (SUI), Vlad Ghizdareanu (ROU)

2 August 2024
22:05
v

Boxscore

Serbia	21–12	Poland
Pts: Majstorović 7		Pts: Bogucki 6

Place de la Concorde, Paris
Referees: Edmond Ho (HKG), Najib Chajiddine (FRA)

4 August 2024
18:35
v

Boxscore

Lithuania	20–18	Serbia
Pts: Pukelis 10		Pts: Majstorović 10

Place de la Concorde, Paris
Referees: Markos Michaelides (SUI), Vlad Ghizdareanu (ROU)

Play-in

4 August 2024
22:05
v

Boxscore

Serbia	19–22	France
Pts: Stojačić 8		Pts: Rambaut 8

Place de la Concorde, Paris
Referees: Vlad Ghizdareanu (ROU), Deanna Jackson (USA)

== Boxing ==
Serbia entered three boxers into the Olympic tournament. Both Russian-born, Vahid Abasov (men's welterweight) and Natalia Shadrina (women's lightweight) secured the spots on the Serbian squad in their respective weight divisions by advancing to the semifinal match at the 2023 European Games in Nowy Targ, Poland. Meanwhile, the third boxer, Sara Ćirković (women's bantamweight) qualified for the Games by advancing to the semifinal round, and obtain one of four eligible spots, in her own weight division, at the first Olympic Qualification Tournament in Busto Arsizio, Italy.

Athlete	Event	Round of 32	Round of 16	Quarterfinals	Semifinals	Final	
Athlete	Event	Opposition Result	Opposition Result	Opposition Result	Opposition Result	Opposition Result	Rank
Vahid Abasov	Men's 71 kg	Bye	Richardson (GBR); L 2–3	Did not advance			
Sara Ćirković	Women's 54 kg	Jitpong (THA); L 1–4	Did not advance				
Natalia Šadrina	Women's 60 kg	Bye	Khelif (ALG); W 5–0	Yang (CHN); L 2–3	Did not advance		

== Canoeing ==
=== Sprint ===
Serbian canoeists qualified three boats in the following distances for the Games through the 2023 ICF Canoe Sprint World Championships in Duisburg, Germany.

Men

Athlete	Event	Heats		Quarterfinals		Semifinals		Final	
Athlete	Event	Time	Rank	Time	Rank	Time	Rank	Time	Rank
Marko Dragosavljević; Marko Novaković	K-2 500 m	1:30.71	4 QF	1:28.57	2 SF	1:30.20	7 FB	1:31.50	11
Anđelo Džombeta; Vladimir Torubarov	K-2 500 m	1:34.22	5 QF	1:29.46	4 SF	1:34.65	8 FB	1:35.00	16
Marko Dragosavljević; Anđelo Džombeta; Marko Novaković; Vladimir Torubarov	K-4 500 m	1:20.99	1 SF	Bye		1:19.91	2 F	1:21.52	6

Women

Athlete	Event	Heats		Quarterfinals		Semifinals		Final	
Athlete	Event	Time	Rank	Time	Rank	Time	Rank	Time	Rank
Milica Novaković	K-1 500 m	1:50.37	2 SF	Bye		1:50.41	3 FB	1:51.55	9
Anastazija Bajuk; Marija Dostanić; Milica Novaković; Dunja Stanojev	K-4 500 m	1:36.40	5 SF	—N/a		1:35.25	3	Did not advance	9

Qualification Legend: FA = Qualify to final (medal); FB = Qualify to final B (non-medal)

== Cycling ==
=== Road ===
Serbia entered one female and one male rider to compete in the road race events at the Games, through the establishment UCI Nation Ranking.

Athlete	Event	Time	Rank
Ognjen Ilić	Men's road race	6:39.27	64
Jelena Erić	Women's road race	4:10.47	66

== Judo ==
Serbia has qualified six judokas for the following weight classes at the Games via IJF Olympics rankings and continental quota based on Olympic point rankings.

Athlete	Event	Round of 32	Round of 16	Quarterfinals	Semifinals	Repechage	BM	
Athlete	Event	Opposition Result	Opposition Result	Opposition Result	Opposition Result	Opposition Result	Opposition Result	Rank
Strahinja Bunčić	Men's −66 kg	Najafov (AZE); W 01–00	Piras (ITA); W 01–00	Vieru (MDA); L 00–10	Did not advance	Emomali (TJK); W WO	Kyrgyzbayev (KAZ); L 00–01	5
Nemanja Majdov	Men's −90 kg	Bye	Tselidis (GRE); L 00–10	Did not advance				
Aleksandar Kukolj	Men's −100 kg	Vég (HUN); L 00–01	Did not advance					
Milica Nikolić	Women's −48 kg	Štangar (SLO); W 01–00	Martínez (ESP); L 00–10	Did not advance				
Marica Perišić	Women's −57 kg	Pradhan (NEP); W 10–00	Lien (TPE); W 01–00	Deguchi (CAN); L 00–01	Did not advance	Funakubo (JPN); L 00–10	Did not advance	7
Milica Žabić	Women's +78 kg	Tavano (ITA); W 10–00	Ortiz (CUB); W 10–00	Hershko (ISR); L 00–10	Did not advance	Sone (JPN); W WO	Dicko (FRA); L 00–10	5

Mixed

Athlete	Event	Round of 32	Round of 16	Quarterfinals	Semifinals	Repechage	BM	
Athlete	Event	Opposition Result	Opposition Result	Opposition Result	Opposition Result	Opposition Result	Opposition Result	Rank
Strahinja Bunčić; Aleksandar Kukolj; Nemanja Majdov; Milica Nikolić; Marica Perišić; Milica Žabić	Team	Bye	Netherlands; W 4–2	Japan; L 1–4	Did not advance	Brazil; L 1–4	Did not advance	7

== Rowing ==
Serbian rowers qualified boats in each of the following classes for the Games, through the 2023 World Rowing Championships in Belgrade; and 2024 Final Qualification Regatta in Lucerne, Switzerland.

Athlete	Event	Heats		Repechage		Quarterfinals		Semifinals		Final	
Athlete	Event	Time	Rank	Time	Rank	Time	Rank	Time	Rank	Time	Rank
Martin Mačković; Nikolaj Pimenov	Men's double sculls	6:17.36	4 R	6:31.54	1 SA/B	—N/a		6:17.35	4 FB	6:13.85	7
Jovana Arsić	Women's single sculls	7:48.29	3 QF	Bye		7:56.18	5 SC/D	7:44.60	1 FC	7:26.09	13

Qualification Legend: FA=Final A (medal); FB=Final B (non-medal); FC=Final C (non-medal); FD=Final D (non-medal); FE=Final E (non-medal); FF=Final F (non-medal); SA/B=Semifinals A/B; SC/D=Semifinals C/D; SE/F=Semifinals E/F; QF=Quarterfinals; R=Repechage

== Shooting ==
Serbian shooters achieved quota places for the following events based on their results at the 2022 and 2023 ISSF World Championships, 2022, 2023 and 2024 European Championships, 2023 European Games, and 2024 ISSF World Olympic Qualification Tournament.

Athlete	Event	Qualification		Final	
Athlete	Event	Points	Rank	Points	Rank
Lazar Kovačević	Men's 50 m rifle 3 positions	592	5 Q	407.4	8
Lazar Kovačević	Men's 10 m air rifle	625.5	37	Did not advance	
Damir Mikec	Men's 10 m air pistol	584	1 Q	136.9	7
Zorana Arunović	Women's 10 m air pistol	575	10	Did not advance	

Mixed

Athlete	Event	Qualification		Final / BM	
Athlete	Event	Points	Rank	Points	Rank
Zorana Arunović; Damir Mikec	10 m air pistol team	581	2 Q	Tarhan / Dikeç (TUR); W 16–14	1st place, gold medalist(s)

== Swimming ==
Serbian swimmers achieved the entry standards in the following events (up to a maximum of 2 swimmers in each event at the Olympic Qualifying Time (OQT), and potentially 1 at the Olympic Consideration Time (OCT):

Athlete	Event	Heat		Semifinal		Final	
Athlete	Event	Time	Rank	Time	Rank	Time	Rank
Andrej Barna	Men's 50 m freestyle	22.19	30	Did not advance			
Andrej Barna	Men's 100 m freestyle	48.34	10 Q	48.11	14	Did not advance	
Velimir Stjepanović	Men's 100 m freestyle	48.40	13 Q	48.78	16	Did not advance	
Velimir Stjepanović	Men's 200 m freestyle	1:47.56	18	Did not advance			
Nikola Aćin; Andrej Barna; Justin Cvetkov; Velimir Stjepanović	Men's 4 × 100 m freestyle relay	3:14.68	11	—N/a		Did not advance	
Anja Crevar	Women's 200 m butterfly	2:18.46	17	Did not advance			
Anja Crevar	Women's 400 m medley	4:49.16	16	—N/a		Did not advance	

== Table tennis ==
Serbia entered one table tennis player into Olympic tournament. Izabela Lupulesku qualified for the Games by virtue of nominated into the top twelve eligible ranked players, in the women's single class, through the release of the final world ranking for Paris 2024.

Athlete	Event	Preliminary	Round of 64	Round of 32	Round of 16	Quarterfinals	Semifinals	Final / BM	
Athlete	Event	Opposition Result	Opposition Result	Opposition Result	Opposition Result	Opposition Result	Opposition Result	Opposition Result	Rank
Izabela Lupulesku	Women's singles	Bye	Díaz (PUR); L 0–4	Did not advance					

== Taekwondo ==
Serbia entered three athletes into the taekwondo competition at the Games. Aleksandra Perišić qualified directly for the Games by virtue of finishing within the top five in the Olympic rankings in her weight division; meanwhile Lev Korneev and Stefan Takov qualified for the Games through the re-allocations of ineligible Individual Neutral Athletes quota, at the 2024 European Qualification Tournament in Sofia, Bulgaria.

Athlete	Event	Qualification	Round of 16	Quarterfinals	Semifinals	Repechage	Final / BM	
Athlete	Event	Opposition Result	Opposition Result	Opposition Result	Opposition Result	Opposition Result	Opposition Result	Rank
Lev Korneev	Men's −58 kg	Diop (SEN); W 2–0	Jendoubi (TUN); L 0–2	Did not advance				
Stefan Takov	Men's −80 kg	Bye	Sawadogo (BUR); L 0–2	Did not advance				
Aleksandra Perišić	Women's –67 kg	–	Sobirjonova (UZB); W 2–1	Tongchan (THA); W 2–0	Song (CHN); W 2–0	Bye	Márton (HUN); L 0–2	2nd place, silver medalist(s)

== Tennis ==
Serbia entered two tennis players into the Olympic tournament. Beijing 2008 bronze medalist Novak Djokovic (world no. 2) and Dušan Lajović (world no. 57) qualified directly for the men's singles as two of the top 56 eligible players in the ATP World Rankings as of 10 June 2024.

Athlete	Event	Round of 64	Round of 32	Round of 16	Quarterfinals	Semifinals	Final / BM	
Athlete	Event	Opposition Result	Opposition Result	Opposition Result	Opposition Result	Opposition Result	Opposition Result	Rank
Novak Djokovic	Men's singles	Ebden (AUS); W 6–0, 6–1	Nadal (ESP); W 6–1, 6–4	Koepfer (GER); W 7–5, 6–3	Tsitsipas (GRE); W 6–3, 7–6^{(7–3)}	Musetti (ITA); W 6–4, 6–2	Alcaraz (ESP); W 7–6^{(7–3)}, 7–6^{(7–2)}	1st place, gold medalist(s)
Dušan Lajović	Men's singles	Marterer (GER); L 3–6, 7–6^{(8–6)}, 3–6	Did not advance					

== Volleyball ==
=== Indoor ===
Summary

Team	Event	Group stage				Quarterfinal	Semifinal	Final / BM	
Team	Event	Opposition Score	Opposition Score	Opposition Score	Rank	Opposition Score	Opposition Score	Opposition Score	Rank
Serbia men's	Men's tournament	France; L 2–3	Slovenia; L 0–3	Canada; W 3–2	3	Did not advance			9
Serbia women's	Women's tournament	France; W 3–0	United States; L 2–3	China; L 1–3	3 QF	Italy; L 0–3	Did not advance		7

==== Men's tournament ====
Serbia men's volleyball team qualified for the Games by virtue of their rank in the World Ranking qualification.

Team roster

The roster was announced on 8 July 2024.

Head coach: (Montenegro) Igor Kolaković

- 2 Uroš Kovačević (c) OH
- 3 Milorad Kapur L
- 7 Petar Krsmanović MB
- 8 Marko Ivović OH
- 9 Nikola Jovović S
- 10 Miran Kujundžić OH
- 12 Pavle Perić OH
- 14 Aleksandar Atanasijević OP
- 16 Dražen Luburić OP
- 18 Marko Podraščanin MB
- 21 Vuk Todorović S
- 29 Aleksandar Nedeljković MB

Group play

Pos	Team	Pld	W	L	Pts	SW	SL	SR	SPW	SPL	SPR	Qualification
1	Slovenia	3	3	0	8	9	3	3.000	282	252	1.119	Quarterfinals
2	France (H)	3	2	1	6	8	5	1.600	290	260	1.115	Quarterfinals
3	Serbia	3	1	2	3	5	8	0.625	256	293	0.874	
4	Canada	3	0	3	1	3	9	0.333	254	277	0.917	

Source: Olympics
Rules for classification: Tiebreakers
(H) Host

28 July 2024; 17:00	France	3–2	Serbia	South Paris Arena 1, Paris; Attendance: 9,372; Referees: Juraj Mokrý (SVK), Hamid Al-Rousi (UAE)
28 July 2024; 17:00	(23–25, 25–17, 25–17, 21–25, 15–6); P2 Report			South Paris Arena 1, Paris; Attendance: 9,372; Referees: Juraj Mokrý (SVK), Hamid Al-Rousi (UAE)

30 July 2024; 17:00	Slovenia	3–0	Serbia	South Paris Arena 1, Paris; Attendance: 9,138; Referees: Denny Cespedes (DOM), Stefano Cesare (ITA)
30 July 2024; 17:00	(25–21, 25–19, 25–19); P2 Report			South Paris Arena 1, Paris; Attendance: 9,138; Referees: Denny Cespedes (DOM), Stefano Cesare (ITA)

3 August 2024; 21:00	Canada	2–3	Serbia	South Paris Arena 1, Paris; Attendance: 9,398; Referees: Stefano Cesare (ITA), Epaminondas Gerothodoros (GRE)
3 August 2024; 21:00	(25–16, 25–22, 24–26, 19–25, 16–18); P2 Report			South Paris Arena 1, Paris; Attendance: 9,398; Referees: Stefano Cesare (ITA), Epaminondas Gerothodoros (GRE)

==== Women's tournament ====
Serbia women's volleyball team qualified for the Games by securing an outright berth as the one of two highest-ranked nations at the Olympic Qualification Tournament in Ningbo, China.

Team roster

The roster was announced on 9 July 2024.

Head coach: (Italy) Giovanni Guidetti

- 1 Bianka Buša OH
- 2 Katarina Lazović OH
- 4 Bojana Drča S
- 5 Mina Popović MB
- 9 Aleksandra Uzelac OH
- 10 Maja Ognjenović (c) S
- 14 Maja Aleksić MB
- 15 Jovana Stevanović MB
- 17 Silvija Popović L
- 18 Tijana Bošković OP
- 19 Bojana Milenković OH
- 22 Sara Lozo OP

Group play

Pos	Team	Pld	W	L	Pts	SW	SL	SR	SPW	SPL	SPR	Qualification
1	China	3	3	0	8	9	3	3.000	277	249	1.112	Quarter-finals
2	United States	3	2	1	6	8	5	1.600	286	278	1.029	Quarter-finals
3	Serbia	3	1	2	4	6	6	1.000	271	257	1.054	Quarter-finals
4	France (H)	3	0	3	0	0	9	0.000	183	233	0.785	

Source: Olympics
Rules for classification: Tiebreakers
(H) Host

29 July 2024; 21:00	France	0–3	Serbia	South Paris Arena 1, Paris; Attendance: 9,350; Referees: Nurper Özbar (TUR), Epaminondas Gerothodoros (GRE)
29 July 2024; 21:00	(17–25, 17–25, 22–25); P2 Report			South Paris Arena 1, Paris; Attendance: 9,350; Referees: Nurper Özbar (TUR), Epaminondas Gerothodoros (GRE)

31 July 2024; 17:00	United States	3–2	Serbia	South Paris Arena 1, Paris; Attendance: 9,384; Referees: Juraj Mokrý (SVK), Karina Rene (ARG)
31 July 2024; 17:00	(25–17, 25–20, 20–25, 14–25, 17–15); P2 Report			South Paris Arena 1, Paris; Attendance: 9,384; Referees: Juraj Mokrý (SVK), Karina Rene (ARG)

4 August 2024; 17:00	China	3–1	Serbia	South Paris Arena 1, Paris; Attendance: 9,395; Referees: Karina Rene (ARG), Angela Grass (BRA)
4 August 2024; 17:00	(21–25, 25–20, 25–22, 29–27); P2 Report			South Paris Arena 1, Paris; Attendance: 9,395; Referees: Karina Rene (ARG), Angela Grass (BRA)

Quarterfinal

6 August 2024; 21:00	Italy	3–0	Serbia	South Paris Arena 1, Paris; Attendance: 9,253; Referees: Fabrice Collados (FRA), Epaminondas Gerothodoros (GRE)
6 August 2024; 21:00	(26–24, 25–20, 25–20); P2 Report			South Paris Arena 1, Paris; Attendance: 9,253; Referees: Fabrice Collados (FRA), Epaminondas Gerothodoros (GRE)

== Water polo ==
Summary

Key:
- FT – After full time.
- P – Match decided by penalty-shootout.

Team	Event	Group stage						Quarterfinal	Semifinal	Final / BM	
Team	Event	Opposition Score	Opposition Score	Opposition Score	Opposition Score	Opposition Score	Rank	Opposition Score	Opposition Score	Opposition Score	Rank
Serbia men's	Men's tournament	Japan; W 16–15	Australia; L 3–8	Spain; L 11–15	France; W 15–8	Hungary; L 13–17	4 QF	Greece; W 12–11	United States; W 10–6	Croatia; W 13–11	1st place, gold medalist(s)

=== Men's tournament ===
Serbia men's national water polo team qualified for the Games by advancing to the quarterfinals and securing an outright berth at the 2024 World Aquatics Championships in Doha, Qatar.

Team roster

A 19-player roster was announced on 24 June 2024. The final roster was announced on 21 July 2024.

Head coach: Uroš Stevanović

- 1 Radoslav Filipović GK
- 2 Dušan Mandić D
- 3 Strahinja Rašović D
- 4 Sava Ranđelović CB
- 5 Miloš Ćuk D
- 6 Nikola Dedović D
- 7 Radomir Drašović CB
- 8 Nikola Jakšić (c) CB
- 9 Nemanja Vico CF
- 10 Boris Vapenski CF
- 11 Petar Jakšić CB
- 12 Viktor Rašović D
- 13 Vladimir Mišović GK

Group play

Pos	Team	Pld	W	PSW	PSL	L	GF	GA	GD	Pts	Qualification
1	Spain	5	5	0	0	0	67	39	+28	15	Quarterfinals
2	Australia	5	3	0	0	2	44	42	+2	9 (Note: Australia 9–8 Hungary)	Quarterfinals
3	Hungary	5	3	0	0	2	62	54	+8	9	Quarterfinals
4	Serbia	5	2	0	0	3	58	63	−5	6	Quarterfinals
5	France (H)	5	1	0	0	4	50	60	−10	3 (Note: France 14–13 Japan)	
6	Japan	5	1	0	0	4	60	83	−23	3	

Source: Olympics
Rules for classification: 1) Points; 2) Head-to-head points; 3) Head-to-head goal difference; 4) Head-to-head goals scored; 5) Goal difference.
(H) Host
Notes:

28 July 2024; 12:05 v	Report	Serbia	16–15	Japan	Paris Aquatic Centre, Paris; Referees: Rafaele Colombo (ITA), Veselin Mišković (MNE)
28 July 2024; 12:05 v	Report	Score by quarters: 4–4, 3–4, 5–3, 4–4			Paris Aquatic Centre, Paris; Referees: Rafaele Colombo (ITA), Veselin Mišković (MNE)
28 July 2024; 12:05 v	Report	Mandić 7	Goals	Inaba 6	Paris Aquatic Centre, Paris; Referees: Rafaele Colombo (ITA), Veselin Mišković (MNE)

30 July 2024; 10:30 v	Report	Australia	8–3	Serbia	Paris Aquatic Centre, Paris; Referees: Andrej Franulović (CRO), Zhang Liang (CHN)
30 July 2024; 10:30 v	Report	Score by quarters: 1–0, 5–1, 1–0, 1–2			Paris Aquatic Centre, Paris; Referees: Andrej Franulović (CRO), Zhang Liang (CHN)
30 July 2024; 10:30 v	Report	Pavillard 4	Goals	Mandić 2	Paris Aquatic Centre, Paris; Referees: Andrej Franulović (CRO), Zhang Liang (CHN)

1 August 2024; 12:05 v	Report	Serbia	11–15	Spain	Paris Aquatic Centre, Paris; Referees: Adrian Alexandrescu (ROU), Rafaele Colombo (ITA)
1 August 2024; 12:05 v	Report	Score by quarters: 3–4, 3–3, 3–3, 2–5			Paris Aquatic Centre, Paris; Referees: Adrian Alexandrescu (ROU), Rafaele Colombo (ITA)
1 August 2024; 12:05 v	Report	Mandić 4	Goals	Granados 4	Paris Aquatic Centre, Paris; Referees: Adrian Alexandrescu (ROU), Rafaele Colombo (ITA)

3 August 2024; 19:30 v	Report	Serbia	15–8	France	Paris Aquatic Centre, Paris; Referees: Boris Margeta (SLO), Adrian Alexandrescu (ROU)
3 August 2024; 19:30 v	Report	Score by quarters: 4–2, 4–2, 4–2, 3–2			Paris Aquatic Centre, Paris; Referees: Boris Margeta (SLO), Adrian Alexandrescu (ROU)
3 August 2024; 19:30 v	Report	four players 2	Goals	Marzouki, Vernoux 2	Paris Aquatic Centre, Paris; Referees: Boris Margeta (SLO), Adrian Alexandrescu (ROU)

5 August 2024; 12:00 v	Report	Hungary	17–13	Serbia	Paris La Défense Arena, Paris; Referees: Adrian Alexandrescu (ROU), Andrej Franulović (CRO)
5 August 2024; 12:00 v	Report	Score by quarters: 2–4, 7–3, 6–2, 2–4			Paris La Défense Arena, Paris; Referees: Adrian Alexandrescu (ROU), Andrej Franulović (CRO)
5 August 2024; 12:00 v	Report	Fekete, Zalánki 4	Goals	Mandić 5	Paris La Défense Arena, Paris; Referees: Adrian Alexandrescu (ROU), Andrej Franulović (CRO)

Quarterfinals

7 August 2024; 15:35 v	Report	Greece	11–12	Serbia	Paris La Défense Arena, Paris; Referees: Frank Ohme (GER), Andrej Franulović (CRO)
7 August 2024; 15:35 v	Report	Score by quarters: 3–3, 2–3, 4–2, 2–4			Paris La Défense Arena, Paris; Referees: Frank Ohme (GER), Andrej Franulović (CRO)
7 August 2024; 15:35 v	Report	Skoumpakis 3	Goals	Mandić 5	Paris La Défense Arena, Paris; Referees: Frank Ohme (GER), Andrej Franulović (CRO)

Semifinals

9 August 2024; 14:35 v	Report	Serbia	10–6	United States	Paris La Défense Arena, Paris; Referees: Georgios Stavridis (GRE), Rafaele Colombo (ITA)
9 August 2024; 14:35 v	Report	Score by quarters: 2–2, 4–2, 2–2, 2–0			Paris La Défense Arena, Paris; Referees: Georgios Stavridis (GRE), Rafaele Colombo (ITA)
9 August 2024; 14:35 v	Report	Dedović 4	Goals	Vavic 2	Paris La Défense Arena, Paris; Referees: Georgios Stavridis (GRE), Rafaele Colombo (ITA)

Gold medal game

11 August 2024; 14:00 v	Report	Serbia	13–11	Croatia	Paris La Défense Arena, Paris; Referees: Boris Margeta (SLO), Michiel Zwart (NED)
11 August 2024; 14:00 v	Report	Score by quarters: 5–2, 3–3, 3–3, 2–3			Paris La Défense Arena, Paris; Referees: Boris Margeta (SLO), Michiel Zwart (NED)
11 August 2024; 14:00 v	Report	Ćuk 3	Goals	Marinić Kragić 3	Paris La Défense Arena, Paris; Referees: Boris Margeta (SLO), Michiel Zwart (NED)

== Wrestling ==
Serbia qualified six wrestlers for the following classes into the Olympic competition. Three of them qualified for the Games by virtue of top five results through the 2023 World Championships in Belgrade, Serbia; meanwhile the other wrestlers qualified for the Games through the European Qualification Tournament in Baku, Azerbaijan; and World Qualification Tournament in Istanbul, Turkey. Stevan Mićić withdrew from Wrestling at the 2024 Summer Olympics – Men's freestyle 57 kg because of injury. Khetag Tsabolov qualified after victory in a doping case with CAS.

Key:

- VT (ranking points: 5–0 or 0–5) – Victory by fall.
- VB (ranking points: 5–0 or 0–5) – Victory by injury (VF for forfeit, VA for withdrawal or disqualification)
- PP (ranking points: 3–1 or 1–3) – Decision by points – the loser with technical points.
- PO (ranking points: 3–0 or 0–3) – Decision by points – the loser without technical points.
- ST (ranking points: 4–0 or 0–4) – Great superiority – the loser without technical points and a margin of victory of at least 8 (Greco-Roman) or 10 (freestyle) points.
- SP (ranking points: 4–1 or 1–4) – Technical superiority – the loser with technical points and a margin of victory of at least 8 (Greco-Roman) or 10 (freestyle) points.

Freestyle

Athlete	Event	Round of 32	Round of 16	Quarterfinal	Semifinal	Repechage	Final / BM	
Athlete	Event	Opposition Result	Opposition Result	Opposition Result	Opposition Result	Opposition Result	Opposition Result	Rank
Khetag Tsabolov	Men's −74 kg	Bye	Mahdavi (EOR); W 10–0	Takatani (JPN); L 0–10	Did not advance	Garzón (CUB); W WO	Dake (USA); L 4–10	5

Greco-Roman

Athlete	Event	Round of 32	Round of 16	Quarterfinal	Semifinal	Repechage	Final / BM	
Athlete	Event	Opposition Result	Opposition Result	Opposition Result	Opposition Result	Opposition Result	Opposition Result	Rank
Georgii Tibilov	Men's −60 kg	Başar (TUR); L 7–8	Did not advance					12
Mate Nemeš	Men's −67 kg	–	Nasibov (UKR); L 2–3	Did not advance		Ismailov (KGZ); L 0–8	Did not advance	10
Aleksandr Komarov	Men's −87 kg	–	Jacobson (USA); W 10–0	Losonczi (HUN); L 2–2	Did not advance			8
Mikheil Kajaia	Men's −97 kg	–	Gabr (EGY); L 1–6	Did not advance				14
