= Basketball (ball) =

Inflated ball used for basketball games

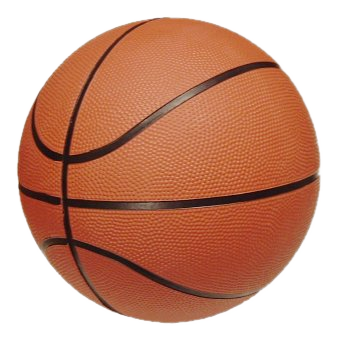
A typical basketball

A basketball is a spherical ball used in basketball games. Basketballs usually range in size from very small promotional items that are only a few inches (some centimeters) in diameter to extra large balls nearly 2 feet (60 cm) in diameter used in training exercises. For example, a youth basketball could be 27 inches (69 cm) in circumference, while a National Collegiate Athletic Association (NCAA) men's ball would be a maximum of 30 inches (76 cm) and an NCAA women's ball would be a maximum of 29 inches (74 cm). The standard for a basketball in the National Basketball Association (NBA) is 29.5 inches (75 cm) in circumference and for the Women's National Basketball Association (WNBA), a maximum circumference of 28.5 inches (72 cm). High school and junior leagues normally use NCAA-, NBA-, or WNBA-sized balls.

Aside from the court and the baskets, the basketball is the only piece of equipment necessary to play the game of basketball. During the game, the ball must be bounced continuously (dribbling), thrown through the air to other players (passing) or thrown towards the basket (shooting). Therefore, the ball must be very durable and easy to hold on to. The ball is also used to perform tricks (sometimes called freestyling), the most common of which are spinning the ball on the tip of one's index finger, dribbling in complex patterns, rolling the ball over one's shoulder, or performing aerobatic maneuvers with the ball while executing a slam dunk, most notably in the context of a slam dunk contest.

== Characteristics ==
Nearly all basketballs have an inflatable inner rubber bladder, generally wrapped in layers of fiber and then covered with a surface made either from leather (traditional), rubber, or a synthetic composite. As in most inflatable balls, there is a small opening that allows the pressure to be increased or decreased.

The surface of the ball is nearly always divided by "ribs" that are recessed below the surface of the ball in a variety of configurations and are generally a contrasting color. An orange surface with black ribs and a possible logo is the traditional color scheme of basketballs but they are sold in various colors. Most famous of these variations, a red/white/blue basketball, was used for the American Basketball Association, the Harlem Globetrotters, and as the "money ball" in the NBA All-Star Weekend's Three Point Contest.

Balls are generally designated for indoor (generally made of leather or absorbent composites), or all-surface use (generally made of rubber or durable composites, also known as indoor/outdoor balls). Indoor balls tend to be more expensive than all-surface balls due to the cost of materials. In addition, brand new all-leather indoor balls must be "broken in" first to achieve optimal grip before use in competition. The abrasiveness of asphalt and the dirt and moisture present in an outdoor setting will usually ruin an indoor ball within a very short period of time, which is why an indoor/outdoor ball is recommended for recreational players. Outdoor balls are commonly made from rubber to cope with rougher conditions, and they need to be filled with more air to retain a suitable level of air pressure in colder weather.

=== Composition and mechanical properties ===
Sports equipment is essential and specific to the sport it's designed for. The equipment in basketball is no different, where the basketball (ball) has been designed for a specific function in the game. In broad terms, the ball needs to be light, so it can be carried, shot, and dribbled. It needs to be round so that no matter how it hits the floor, it has a predictable trajectory. It needs to be elastic and have bounce so that when it is dribbled, it comes back to the player. The ball also needs to be durable enough to last a long time for competitions and games, whether inside or outside. The components that make up a basketball are what give it these properties. They include a hollow bladder made of butyl rubber wrapped in nylon thread and encased in a leather sleeve. Each of these materials has important mechanical properties that play a role in using a basketball.

Butyl rubber makes up the inner bladder of the basketball. This is the same material that makes up the inner tube of a bike wheel. It is a copolymer made up of 98% isobutylene and 2% isoprene. It is a synthetic material that resembles natural rubber properties. It has good resistance to abrasion, tearing, and flexing, with a low gas permeability. The material's high density and low molecular movement can explain the low gas permeability. Butyl rubber has a density of around 920kg/m^3. This is a relatively high density where these chains are highly packed, reducing the amount of gas that can permeate through. Butyl rubber also has a low degree of molecular movement, the movement of the individual chains, even above the glass transition temperature, reducing gas penetration. It has a compressive strength between 2.2 and 3.3 MPa, which is the resistance of a material to breaking under compression, and a fatigue strength at 10^7 cycles is approximately 1 MPa. This is a relatively low compressive and fatigue strength but for the applications of a basketball it is sufficient. This makes the ball durable when it is dribbled or thrown against the basketball backboard repeatedly. One final important mechanical property of butyl rubber is its vibration dampening. Vibration dampening describes the pattern of oscillation decay after an input of energy, for instance when one bounces a basketball, and each sequential bounce reaches a lower and lower height until it stops. This may seem counterintuitive, but a ball that has relatively low vibration dampening is desired, so that it bounces back, as opposed to it having no such dampening so that all the force is transferred back to the players' hands or the hoop potentially causing some damage. The viscoelastic properties of butyl rubber are responsible for the vibration dampening, meaning that the material exhibits elastic and viscous characteristics when undergoing deformation allowing for a dissipation and absorption of energy.

The next component of a basketball is the nylon thread. After the butyl rubber bladder is inflated, it is wrapped in thousands of meters of nylon thread to create stability and a more perfect sphere. Nylon, or polyamide, is a generic name for a long polymer chain with repeating amide groups. The specific type of nylon used for basketball manufacturing is nylon 6,6 which gets its name from it being made up of 2 monomers with 6 carbons each, adipic acid and hexamethylenediamine. Important features of nylon that make it suitable for a basketball are that it can form into a fiber, it has high tensile strength, so as it gets wrapped around the ball it has a lower chance of just snapping under the tension, and it is lightweight. It has a tensile modulus of 3,103 MPa. This means that it resists stretching, making it a stiff material that does not deform much under stress. It has a compressive modulus of 2,896 MPa, which means the material is stiff under compression, and the material behaves elastically and returns to its original shape after compression. Both properties help the basketball hold its shape during bouncing and enhance its durability.

Finally, the last material is leather. The WNBA and NBA use genuine cow leather for their balls. The NBA attempted to move to a composite leather ball with a new design in the 2006–07 season but following substantial complaints from players reverted to the classic leather ball midway through the year. The leather serves as an encasing for the bladder wrapped in nylon thread. It keeps everything together, is wear resistant, and does not hinder the properties that the nylon and butyl rubber have that are essential for the function of the ball. Leather offers nearly no resistance to compression, which improves grip on the ball, allowing for better control and it allows for shock absorption protecting the players' hands. The microstructure of leather is a randomly woven network of collagen fibers which allows the material to deform slightly under stress and return to its original shape. It is what makes the material soft and tough. It has a tensile modulus of around 94–100 MPa, so the material is relatively soft and flexible, allowing it to be stretched and shaped into a ball. Leather also can be treated to have various surface textures. The leather on a basketball has a pebbled structure, increasing friction between the ball and the player's hand allowing for better grip.

All together, each of these three materials are vital for the functionality of the basketball.

=== Sizes ===
Different sizes are used for different age groups. The common standards are:

Size	Type	Circumference	Weight	Notes on basketball
7	Men	750–770 mm 29.5–30.3 in	580–620 g 20–22 oz	Men and boys ages 15 and up. This is the official size for men's high school, college, and professional.
6	Women	715–730 mm 28.1–28.7 in	510–550 g 18–19 oz	Boys ages 12–14. Women and girls ages 12 and up. This is the official size for women's high school, college, and professional.
5	Youth (North America); Mini (FIBA)	685–700 mm 27.0–27.6 in	465–495 g 16–17 oz	Children ages 9–11 years old. This is the standard youth basketball.
4	Youth (North America)	25.5 in (65 cm)	14 oz (400 g)	Children ages 5–8 years old.
3	Mini (North America)	22.0 in (56 cm)	10 oz (280 g)	Children ages 4–8 years old. Also known as "mini" basketball.

The ball used for all competitions (men's, women's, and mixed) in the formal halfcourt game of 3x3 combines characteristics of the size 6 and size 7 balls. Its circumference is that of a size 6 ball, but its weight is that of a size 7.

== History ==
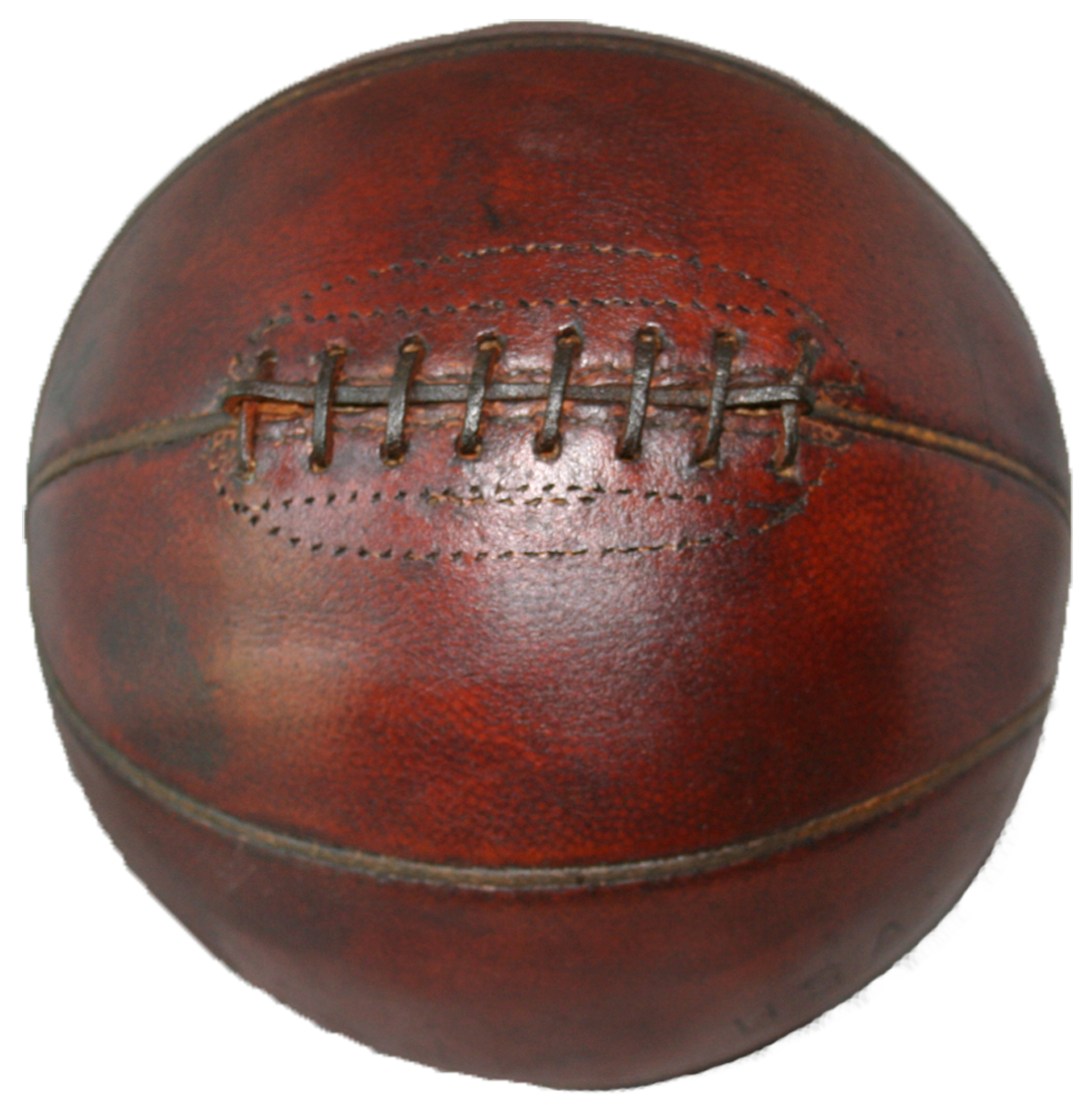
A historic basketball.

In early December 1891, the chairman of the physical education department at the School for Christian Workers (Springfield College) in Springfield, Massachusetts, instructed physical education teacher James Naismith to invent a new game to entertain the school's athletes in the winter season. Naismith assembled his class of 18 young men, appointed captains of two nine-player teams, and set in motion the first-ever basketball game, played with a soccer ball and two peach baskets tacked to either end of the gymnasium.

The first purpose-built basketballs were made from panels of leather stitched together with a rubber bladder inside. A cloth lining was added to the leather for support and uniformity. A molded version of the early basketball was invented in 1942. For many years, leather was the material of choice for basketball coverings, however, in the late 1990s, synthetic composite materials were put forth and rapidly gained acceptance in most leagues, although the NBA's game balls still use real leather (apart from a brief experiment with a microfiber composite ball in 2006 that was not well received by the players).

From 1967 through 1976, the American Basketball Association (ABA) used a distinctive red, white and blue basketball. It is used in the NBA's Three-Point Contest.

== Basketball manufacturers ==
Spalding
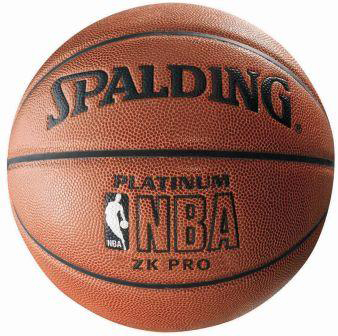
Spalding was the first company to produce a basketball for official use. Company founder A. G. Spalding made the first dedicated basketball in the last years of the 19th century at the behest of James Naismith. It has produced basketballs since that time and was the NBA's official game ball supplier from 1983 to 2021. They also produced the basketballs for the WNBA and NBA G League. While it no longer provides balls to the NBA, it remains active on the collegiate level (where Spalding TF1000 Legacy balls are used for several in-season multi-team events as well as the official ball of the NAIA and NJCAA) and is the official ball of several state high school associations. The company produces a wide variety of balls for the consumer market.

In 2012, it became official provider for both the EuroLeague and EuroCup competitions. It also serves as provider for Liga ACB.

Spalding became the supplier for NBL Australia in 2010.

Molten
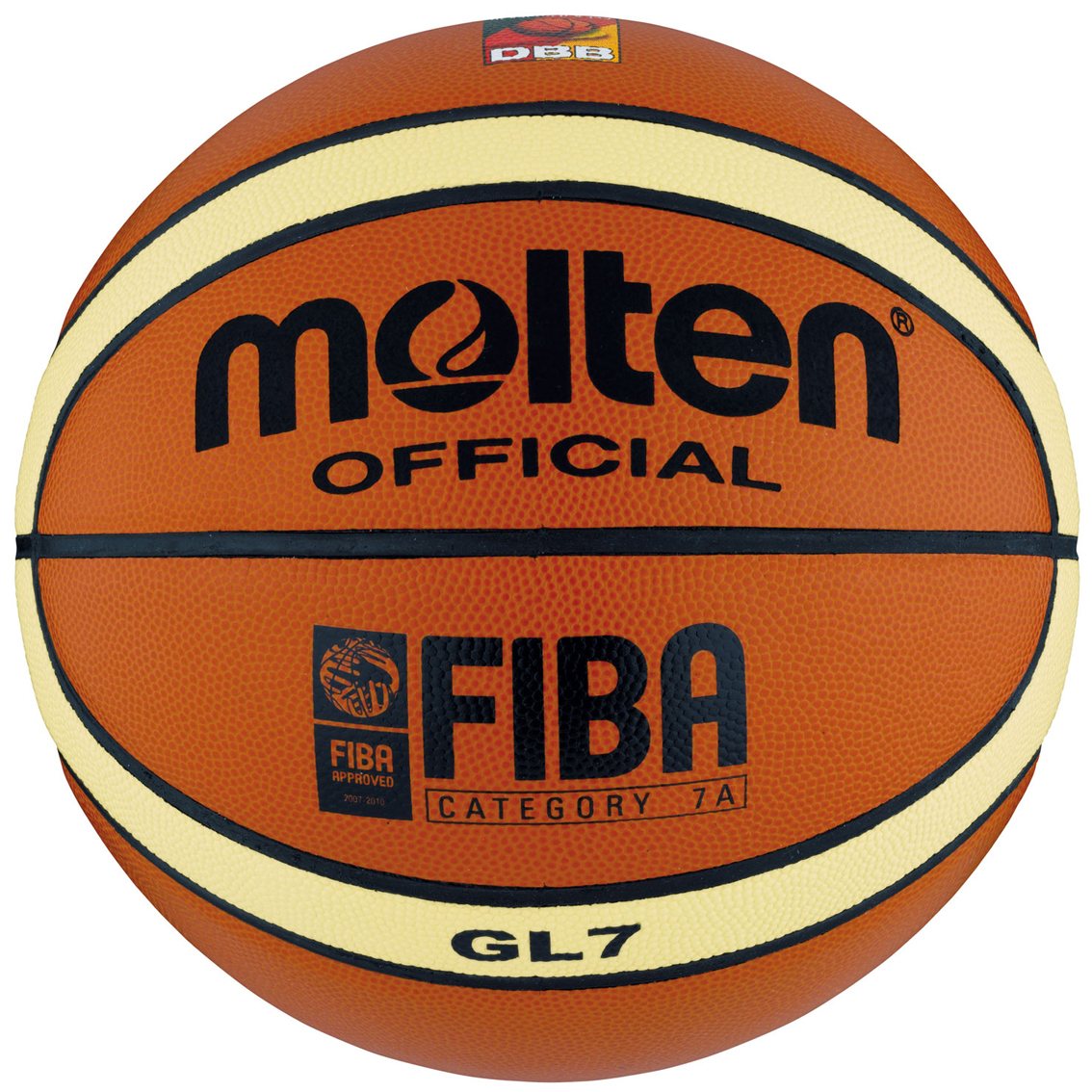
Molten, a Japanese sporting goods manufacturer, has the contract to provide game balls for:
- All International Basketball Federation (FIBA) world championships and continental qualifying events.
- All FIBA Asia events.
- The VTB United League.
- Many domestic leagues, including Australia, Argentina, Uruguay, France (women), Great Britain, Greece, Indonesia, Italy, Lithuania, the Philippines, Poland, and Portugal.

Until the 2006–07 season, it provided balls for both Europe-wide competitions organized by Euroleague Basketball, the EuroLeague and ULEB Cup (the EuroCup). Molten's top-of-the line product is the GL7, a leather ball with a distinctive 12-panel design.

Wilson
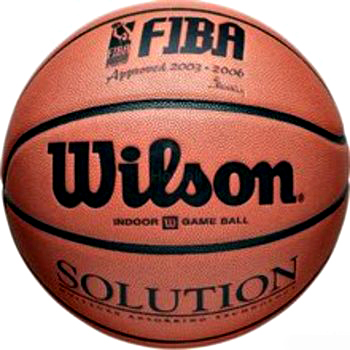
Wilson Sporting Goods is the official ball supplier of all NCAA postseason tournaments, most notably the men's and women's Division I tournaments; the Wilson Evo NXT is used for tournament play and is also used by a number of collegiate teams during the season as well by many high school leagues. As of 2015, Wilson supplies balls for all FIBA-operated 3x3 competitions. Like Spalding, Wilson produces a variety of balls for the consumer market. It served as the supplier of the NBA's game ball from 1946 to 1983, and again since 2021.
Rawlings
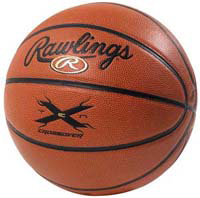
Rawlings has manufactured basketballs since 1902. The company is known for producing a 10-panel ball (the TEN), along with traditional 8-panel balls. The TEN basketball is the official ball of the Amateur Athletic Union and the "Gus Macker", the largest 3-on-3 basketball tournament in the United States.
Nike
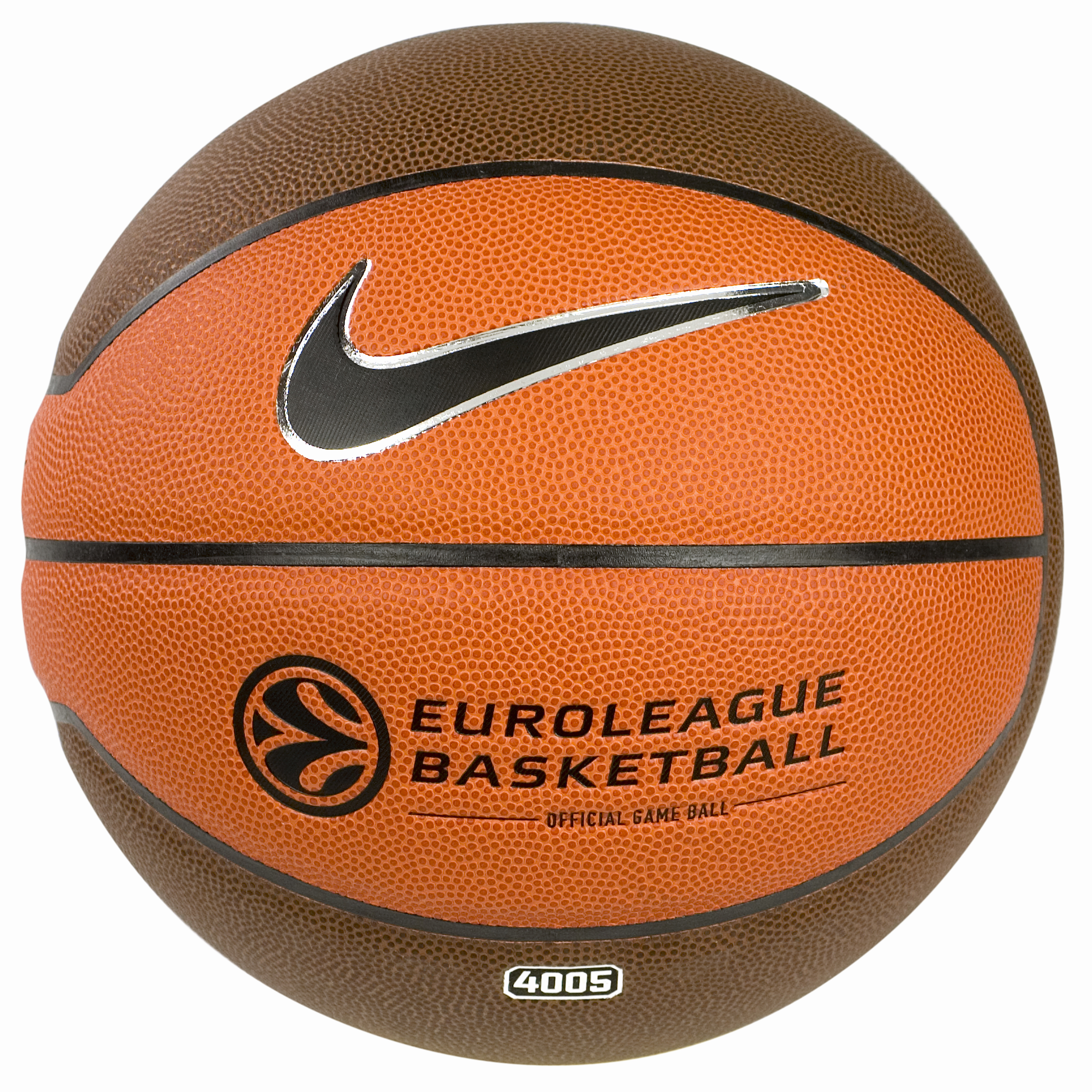
Nike had the contract to produce balls for the Euroleague Basketball (operators of the EuroLeague and the EuroCup) from 2007 until 2012, when it turned to Spalding. In the Philippines the NCAA (unrelated to the American NCAA) and UAAP use the Nike 4005 Official Tournament Balls. Most NCAA Division I collegiate teams with Nike apparel contracts use the Nike Elite Championship ball during their home games; there is no single standard ball required at the NCAA level until conference and national tournaments, and for many teams the ball used is linked to their uniform provider.
Nivia
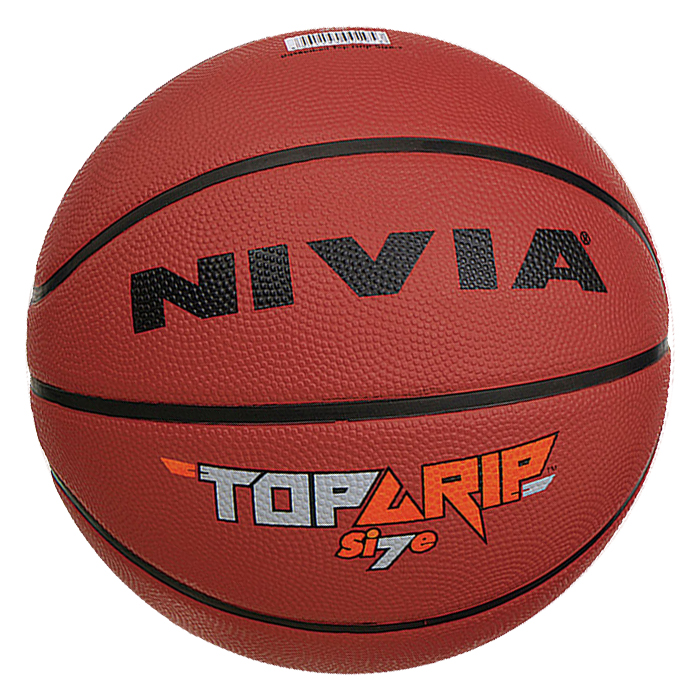
Nivia is based in Jalandhar, India and it has been manufacturing basketballs since 1934. It makes hand stitched balls which have been the official balls for many national, international leagues, championship including the All India Football Federation (AIFF).
Others
Other companies that make basketballs include Adidas, Baden Sports (official supplier for the Harlem Globetrotters), Dunlop, Tarmak, Mikasa, Mitre, Puma, and And1, to name a few.

== See also ==
- List of inflatable manufactured goods
