= Nike Basketball 3ON3 Tournament =

Annual outdoor basketball tournament

Nike 3ON3 Basketball Tournament
- Logo for the Nike 3ON3 Basketball Tournament.
- Status: Active
- Genre: Sports
- Frequency: Annual
- Venue: L.A. Live
- Locations: Los Angeles, California
- Coordinates: 34.0390°N 118.2673°W
- Country: United States
- Years active: 14
- Founded: 2008
- Participants: 5,000
- Major events: 3-on-3 basketball
- Sponsors: Nike Basketball, Big 5 Sporting Goods, Spartan
- Website: https://www.nike3on3.com/

The Nike Basketball 3ON3 Tournament is an annual outdoor 3-on-3 or 4-on-4 basketball tournament held at Los Angeles, California, and in the event venue L.A. Live.

It is the largest outdoor 3-on-3 tournament in California, with over 1,500 teams, 5,000 players, and 25,000 spectators attending the event every year, and was first started in 2008. In 2018 and 2017, the winners of the elite division for men and women were able to participate in the official 2018 and 2019 USA Basketball 3×3 National Tournament, and were able to win $20,000 in prize money and advances to the FIBA 3X3 World Tour Nanjing Masters in China. Ryan Golden, Commissioner of the Nike Basketball 3ON3 Tournament said “We’re thrilled that our tournament continues to attract talent throughout the country in addition to the attention of FIBA, who this year, designated the men’s Nike Elite Division an official FIBA 3X3 Satellite Tournament,” and, “It’s an exciting time for 3x3 basketball, and even more so to realize that players from our tournament could potentially represent the USA in the 2020 Olympic Games in Tokyo.”

The tournament was however cancelled in 2020 and 2021 due to the ongoing COVID-19 pandemic, in compliance with COVID-19 social gathering guidelines.

== Teams ==
The event hosts 6 different groups divided based on age and talent, and teams within the same group will compete against each other. The 6 groups are youth (ages 8-9 and 10-12, with a fee of $200), teen (ages 13-19, with a fee of $220), adult (ages 20 and over with a fee of $220), adult elite (ages 18 and over, with a fee of $260), wheelchair, and special Olympics (All-ages and no fee).

=== Prizes ===
Picture of the Bennett Awards trophy for the 2019 Nike 3ON3 Tournament.

The champion team of each group's bracket wins an award t-shirt, and a medal. The runner-ups for each bracket will also win a t-shirt. In 2019, Nike partnered with Bennett Awards to create a custom Nike 3ON3 Basketball trophy for the winning teams in each elite bracket that year.

== Sponsors and partners ==
Nike 3ON3 Basketball is sponsored by Nike Basketball, Big 5 Sporting Goods, Spartan, and is partnered with L.A. Live. They partnered with Bennett Awards in 2019 to create a custom trophy for the 2019 Nike 3ON3 Tournament winners, and Dash Radio for the 2018 Nike 3ON3 Basketball Tournament to help host the Nike 3ON3 Celebrity Basketball Game. In the past, they have also partnered with Powerade, Toyota, and Bodybuilding.com.

=== Fundraising ===
In 2012, 2013, and 2014, Nike hosted the Josh Hutcherson Celebrity Basketball Game benefitting the Straight But Not Narrow Foundation. In 2016 and 2017, that year partnering with REAL 92.3, Nike hosted the ESPN LA 710AM All-Star Celebrity Game with their 3ON3 tournament, and all proceeds from that event went to the Scott Memorial Cancer Research Fund at The V Foundation.

== Extra events ==
During the 3ON3 Tournament, Nike also hosts several events. These events are the Nike Dunk Contest, Skills Challenge, 3-Point Contest, Elite play, Special Performances and Pay-to-Play contests.
