= Nadija Smailbegović =

Serbian basketball player

Personal information
- Born: 5 April 2001 (age 25)
- Listed height: 1.77 m (5 ft 10 in)

Nadija Smailbegović (born 5 April 2001) is a Serbian basketball player. She represented Serbia at the 2024 Summer Olympics.
