= Zhao Jiaren =

Chinese basketball player

Zhao Jiaren 赵嘉仁
No. 9 – Shanxi Loongs
- Position: Small forward / power forward
- League: CBA

Personal information
- Born: 6 January 1999 (age 27) Harbin, Heilongjiang, China
- Listed height: 2.03 m (6 ft 8 in)
- Listed weight: 96 kg (212 lb)

Career information
- Playing career: 2019–present

Career history
- 2019–2026: Zhejiang Lions
- 2026–present: Shanxi Loongs
Medals
Men's 3x3 basketball
Representing China
FIBA 3x3 Asia Cup
| Bronze medal – third place | 2022 Singapore |

Zhao Jiaren (born 6 January 1999) is a Chinese professional basketball player for the Shanxi Loongs of the Chinese Basketball Association (CBA). He has also represented China at the 2024 Summer Olympics in the 3x3 basketball event.
