= Gus Macker 3-on-3 Basketball Tournament =

American basketball event

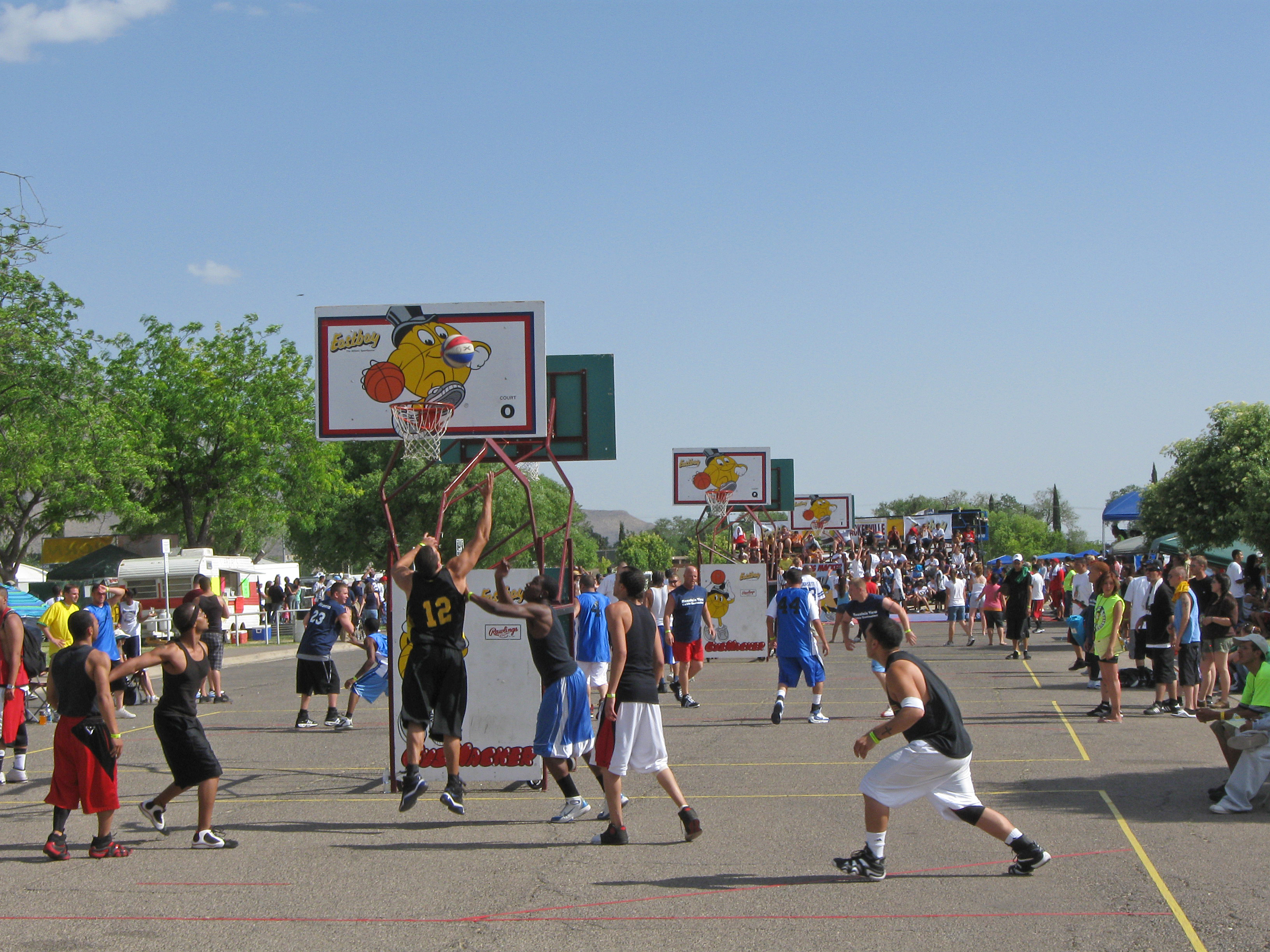
Gus Macker tournament in Alamogordo, New Mexico, May 2009

The Gus Macker 3-on-3 Basketball Tournament is a nationwide event for players of a variety of age and skill levels in the United States. Although every tournament is different, a typical Gus Macker event involves basketball courts set up in parking lots or closed-off public streets. Tournaments are mid-level to major sports media events and are held virtually every weekend from spring through summer.

== History ==
According to the tournament's website, the "Original Gus Macker 3-on-3 Basketball Tournament" began in 1974 in Lowell, Michigan. Scott McNeal (alias Gus Macker) and brother Mitch gathered 18 friends who played competitively for a tournament purse of $18. As the tournament grew, the McNeals moved their tournament to Belding in 1987, then took the tournament on the road to other communities, branding it as the "Gus Macker All-World Tour". According to the website, over 10,000 players entered the tournament as it visited five cities that year.

The tournament currently holds both indoor and outdoor competitions annually in more than 75 cities, with over 200,000 players and 1.7 million spectators in attendance. The tournament prohibits alcohol and tobacco sponsorships.

== Rules ==
The Macker rules significantly differ from those of FIBA-sanctioned 3x3 basketball.

- Both are played on half of a standard full court, but Macker uses the NCAA/NBA standard while FIBA uses its own slightly smaller court.
- Macker games may start with any number of players on the court, up to 3 per team. FIBA games may only start with 3 players from each team on the court.
- Both use 1- and 2-point field goals instead of the 2 and 3 of the full-court game. However, the 2-point arcs differ between the rule sets. FIBA uses an arc 6.75 metres (22.1 ft) from the center of the basket, except along the sidelines, where it is 0.9 metres (35 in) from the sideline. Macker uses different arcs for its top men's and women's divisions and "Neighborhood" play. In both top divisions, the US high school arc of 19.75 feet (6.02 m) is used; in "Neighborhood" play, no arc is set, but a distance of 18 feet (5.5 m) is suggested (though the high school arc is often used).
- The first possession of a game is determined by a coin flip in both rule sets. However, in FIBA play, the winner may choose to take possession either at the start of the game or the start of a potential overtime. In Macker play, the winner receives possession.
- Games are 10 minutes in official FIBA play, and 25 minutes in all Macker divisions. FIBA, however, allows grassroots events to be held without a game clock, suggesting a score limit in points equal to the elapsed time in minutes. If the time limit is reached before a set winning score (see below), the leading team is declared the winner by rule.
- Macker events have no shot clock. Official FIBA events have a 12-second shot clock, with this feature being optional for grassroots events.
- Both FIBA and Macker end games by rule once a certain point total is reached:
  - FIBA: 21 points in official events; grassroots events may use different ending scores. No minimum victory margin is required.
  - Macker has different ending scores depending on the division and bracket. All Macker tournaments are double-elimination, with winners' and losers' brackets, plus a consolation "Toilet Bowl Bracket" for teams that lose their first two games.
    - Top Division (men and women): 20 points in the winners' bracket, with a 2-point victory margin required unless 25 points is reached. 15 points in the losers' bracket, with a 2-point victory margin required unless 20 points is reached. 10 points in the Toilet Bowl Bracket, with no required victory margin.
    - Neighborhood: 15 points in all brackets. 2-point victory margin, up to a maximum of 20 points, in winners' and losers' brackets; no victory margin required in Toilet Bowl Bracket.
- Macker allows each team 2 timeouts per game in top divisions. Neighborhood divisions allow only 1 timeout except in age-group divisions for players 40 and over, in which 2 timeouts are allowed. FIBA allows each team only 1 timeout per game.
- Overtime rules differ between the two sets:
  - In Macker, the first possession is determined by a coin flip. In FIBA, the first possession is awarded to the team that began regulation play on defense, based on the result of the pregame coin flip.
  - Overtime in Macker is true sudden-death, with the first score ending the game. FIBA overtime ends once a team scores 2 points.
- Dunking is prohibited at all times in Macker events, except during game play in the top men's and women's divisions and during any dunk contests that are organized during an event. FIBA allows dunks at all times.
- Both rule sets start bonus free throws at the same point—once the fouling side has committed its 7th team foul, with the caveat that common fouls committed on offense can never result in free throws, regardless of the number of team fouls.
- In the case of double fouls, the offensive team retains possession under Macker rules. Under FIBA rules, double fouls while a team is in possession result in that team retaining possession. In situations where neither team has possession, the team that was last on defense receives possession.
- Macker keeps individual personal foul counts for players in its top divisions, with players being disqualified on their 6th foul in a game. FIBA does not keep individual personal foul counts, nor does Macker in other divisions.
- Free throw rules also differ significantly between the two sets.
  - Macker
    - Common fouls by the defending team result in 1 free throw in all free throw situations (shooting fouls, plus fouls in bonus situations). This is true even for fouls on missed 2-point shot attempts.
    - For shooting fouls, if the basket is made, possession will go to the defensive team after the free throw, whether it is made or missed. If the basket is missed, possession goes to the defensive team if the ensuing free throw is made, and to the offensive team if the free throw is missed.
    - For non-shooting fouls, possession goes to the defensive team if the free throw is made, and to the offense if it is missed.
    - In any free throw situation, the shooting team may choose to shoot either a 1-point or 2-point free throw. If a 2-point free throw is chosen, the defensive team is awarded possession after the free throw, regardless of its result, except for technical fouls.
    - Technical fouls result in 2 free throws for the non-offending team, which may be taken as 1-point or 2-point shots. The non-offending team receives possession regardless of the result of the free throws.
  - FIBA
    - All free throws must be taken within the free-throw circle above the free-throw line, and are thus worth 1 point. There is no option for 2-point free throws.
    - Players fouled on a missed shot attempt receive a number of free throws equal to the value of the shot attempt except when the foul is the fouling team's 7th or greater during a game (see below).
    - On free throw attempts, the ball is live once it hits the rim, except if (1) it enters the basket, (2) it is the first of two free throws, or (3) the shooting team is guaranteed possession regardless of the result of the shot.
    - Team fouls 7–9, if committed by the defense, result in 2 free throws for the non-fouling team. This applies even in the case of shooting fouls, whether or not the basket attempt was made.
    - Technical fouls result in 1 free throw plus possession for the non-offending team. Unsportsmanlike fouls, as well as team fouls beyond 9 (even if shooting fouls), result in 2 free throws plus possession for the non-offending team.
    - However, offensive fouls (if not technical or unsportsmanlike) never result in free throws, regardless of the number of team fouls.
- Restart procedures also differ:
  - Macker: All fouls, violations, and out-of-bounds plays are played from out-of-bounds at the top of the court. This procedure is also used after made baskets.
  - FIBA: There are no passes from out of bounds. After a made basket, the scored-upon team takes possession under the basket, and can dribble or pass the ball from that point. In all other dead ball situations, possession starts with an "exchange" in which the team receiving possession gets the ball behind the arc.
- Neither rule set has an alternate possession rule. All held balls are awarded to the defensive team.
- In both rule sets, the ball must be "cleared" behind the arc after any change of possession during open play before a shot may be legally taken.
- The ball itself is also different between the rule sets:
  - Macker: All men's competitions use the "size 7" ball (standard circumference 29.5 in/75 cm, standard weight 22 oz/620 g) used in the men's full-court game. All women's competitions use the "size 6" ball (standard circumference 28.5 in/72 cm, standard weight 20 oz/570 g) of the women's full-court game.
  - FIBA: All competitions, whether men's, women's, or mixed-sex, use a unique ball with the circumference of the size 6 ball but the weight of the size 7 ball.
