= Zhang Ning (basketball) =

Chinese basketball player

Zhang Ning 张宁
No. 8 – Shanxi Loongs
- Position: Point Guard
- League: Chinese Basketball Association

Personal information
- Born: 19 February 1997 (age 29) Chengde, Hebei, China
- Listed height: 1.93 m (6 ft 4 in)

Career information
- College: Peking University
- Playing career: 2020–present

Career history
- 2020–present: Shanxi Loongs

Zhang Ning (born 19 February 1997) is a Chinese basketball player. He represented China at the 2024 Summer Olympics in 3x3 event.

== Career ==
Zhang Ning blocks a career high 2 shots (2020) On December 22,2020, Ning set his career high in blocks in a CBA game. That day he went for 2 blocks in Shanxi’s home loss against Shenzhen Aviators, 87-98. He also had 11 points, 3 rebounds and 2 assists 1.
