= Lucas Dussoulier =

French basketball player (born 1996)

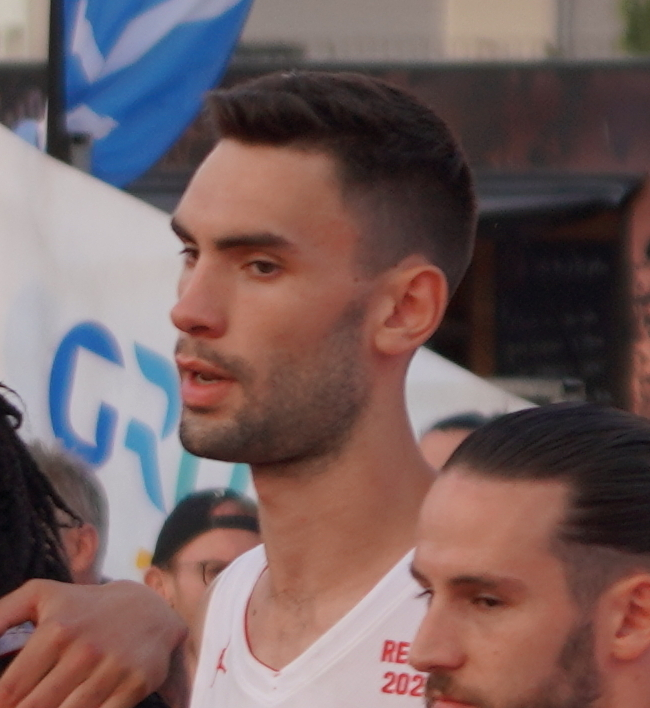
- Dussoulier in 2022

No. 22 – Nanterre 92
- Position: Small forward
- League: LNB Élite; Champions League

Personal information
- Born: 27 July 1996 (age 30) Libourne, France
- Listed height: 2.04 m (6 ft 8 in)

Career information
- Playing career: 2012–present

Career history
- 2012–2014: INSEP
- 2014–2016: Élan Béarnais
- 2016–2018: Charleville-Mézières
- 2018–2020: Béliers de Kemper
- 2020–present: Nanterre 92
Medals
Men's 3x3 basketball
Representing France
Olympic Games
Silver medal – second place	2024 Paris	Team
Europe Cup
Silver medal – second place	2019 Debrecen
Youth Olympic Games
Silver medal – second place	2014 Nanjing	Team

Lucas Dussoulier (born 27 July 1996) is a French basketball player for Nanterre 92 of the LNB Pro A and the Champions League. He represented France at the 2024 Summer Olympics in 3x3 event.
