= Timothé Vergiat =

French basketball player (born 1998)

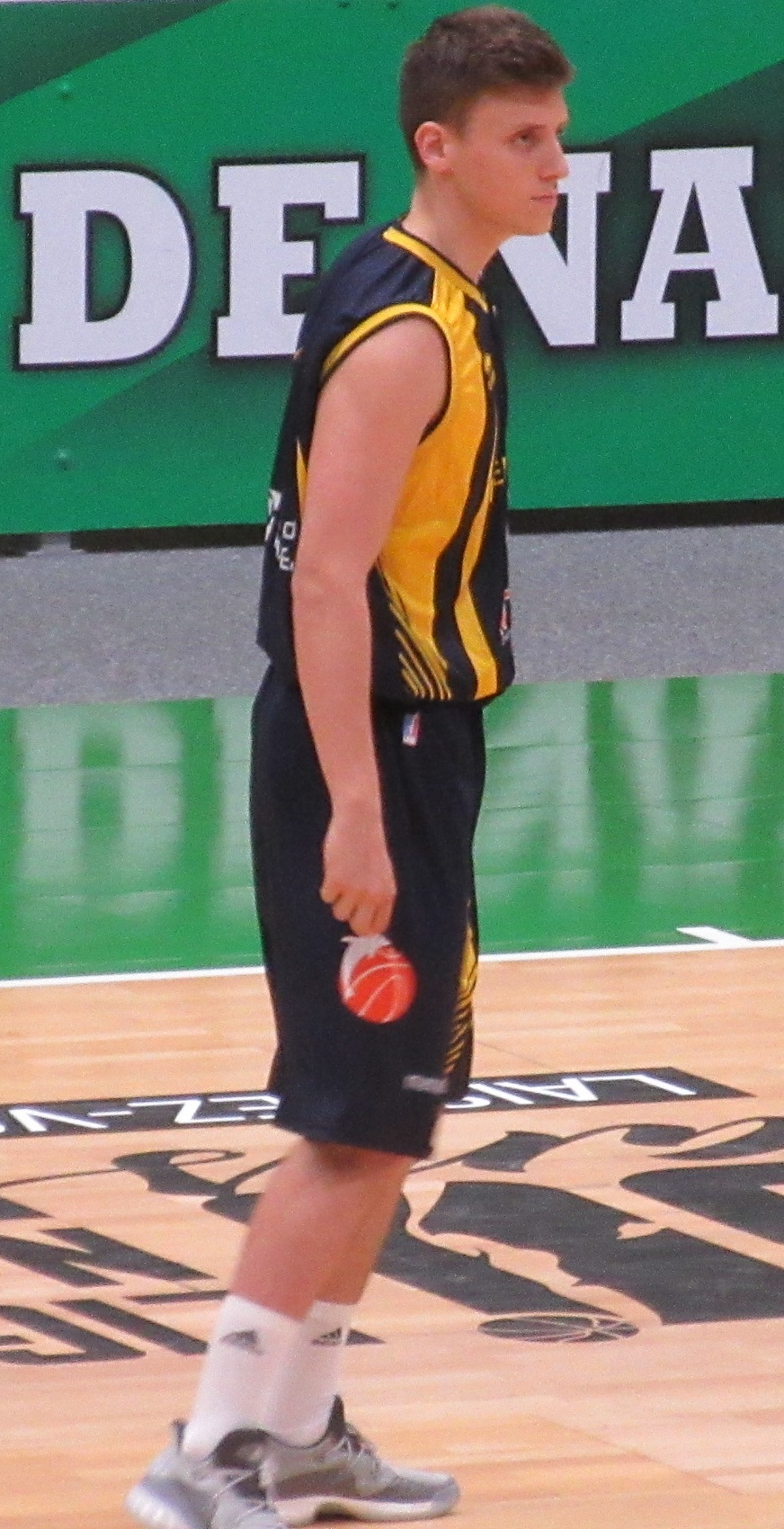
- Vergiat in 2017

Personal information
- Born: 7 March 1998 (age 28) Roanne, France
- Listed height: 1.87 m (6 ft 2 in)
Medals
Men's 3x3 basketball
Representing France
Olympic Games
Silver medal – second place	2024 Paris	Team

Timothé Vergiat (born 7 March 1998) is a French basketball player. He represented France at the 2024 Summer Olympics in 3x3 event.
