= Jules Rambaut =

French basketball player (born 1998)

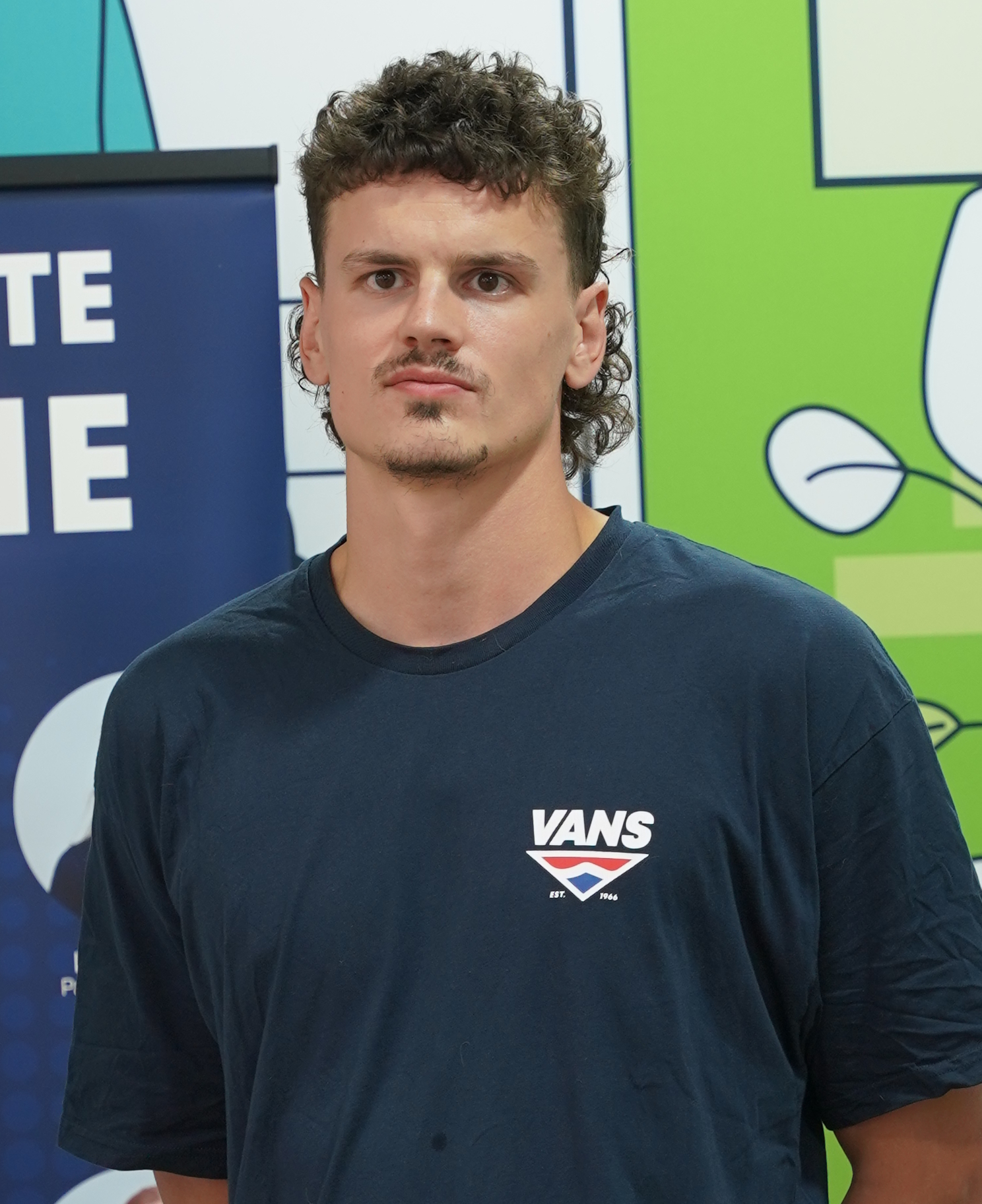
- Rambaut in 2024

Personal information
- Born: 6 April 1998 (age 28) Reims, France
- Listed height: 2.00 m (6 ft 7 in)
Medals
Men's 3x3 basketball
Representing France
Olympic Games
Silver medal – second place	2024 Paris	Team
FIBA 3x3 Europe Cup
Bronze medal – third place	2026 Antwerp	Team

Jules Rambaut (born 6 April 1998) is a French basketball player. He represented France at the 2024 Summer Olympics in 3x3 event.
