= Franck Seguela =

French basketball player

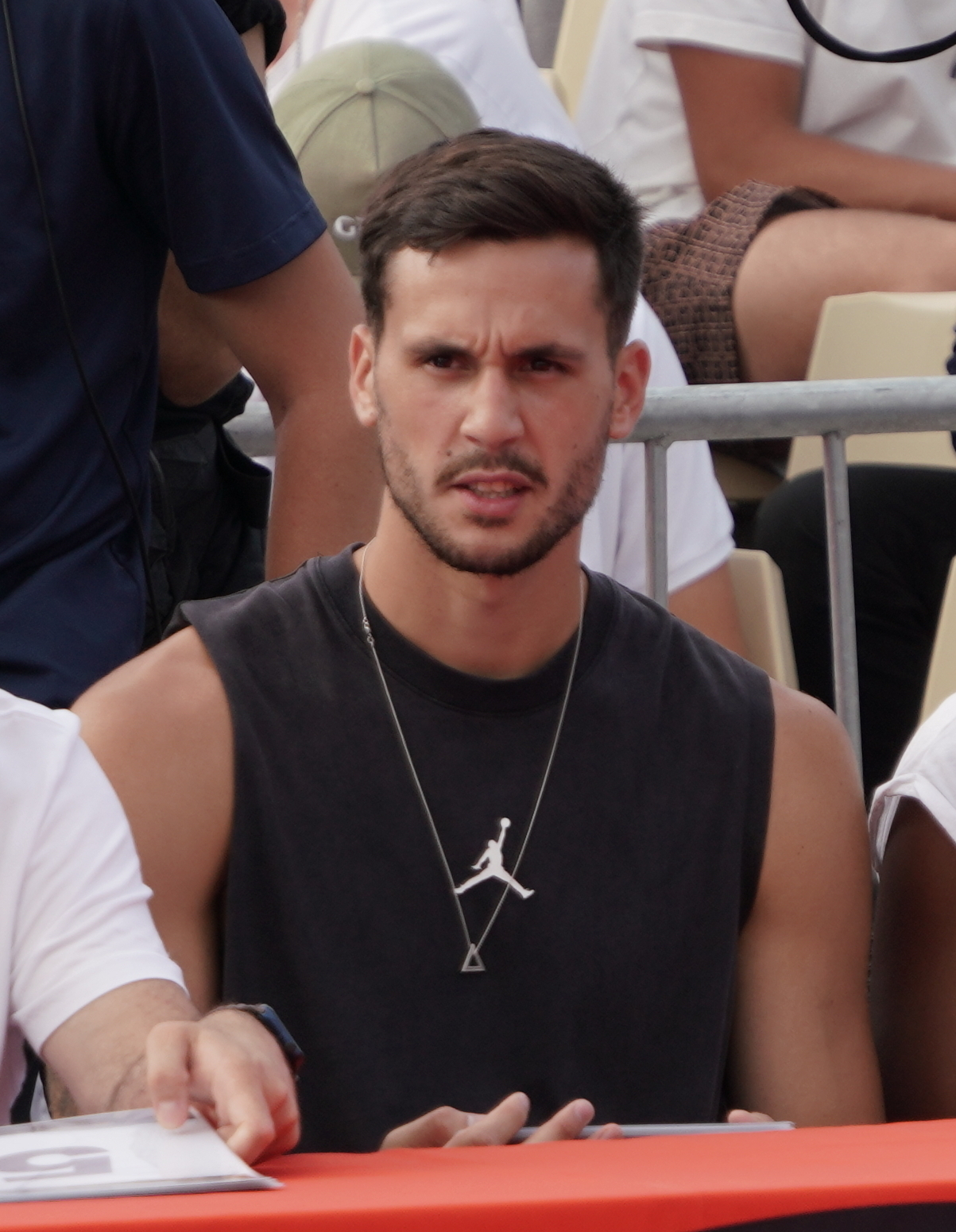
- Seguela in 2022

Personal information
- Born: 30 May 1997 (age 29) Dijon, France
- Listed height: 2.00 m (6 ft 7 in)
Medals
Men's 3x3 basketball
Representing France
Olympic Games
Silver medal – second place	2024 Paris	Team
World Cup
Bronze medal – third place	2022 Antwerp	Team

Franck Seguela (born 30 May 1997) is a French basketball player. He represented France at the 2024 Summer Olympics in 3x3 event.
