= Aurelijus Pukelis =

Lithuanian basketball player (born 1994)

No. 24 – Sūduva-Matinga
- Position: Power forward
- League: NKL Lithuania

Personal information
- Born: 17 May 1994 (age 32) Silale, Lithuania
- Listed height: 205 cm (6 ft 9 in)
- Listed weight: 100 kg (220 lb)
Medals
Men's 3x3 basketball
Representing Lithuania
Olympic Games
Bronze medal – third place	2024 Paris	Team
FIBA 3x3 Europe Cup
Gold medal – first place	2025 Copenhagen	Team
Silver medal – second place	2021 Paris
Silver medal – second place	2023 Jerusalem
Bronze medal – third place	2019 Debrecen	Team
Bronze medal – third place	2024 Vienna	Team

Aurelijus Pukelis (born 17 May 1994) is a Lithuanian basketball player. He represented Lithuania at the 2024 Summer Olympics in 3x3 event.
