= 2023 Beach Volleyball World Championships =

2023 World Championships
- Location: Tlaxcala, Apizaco, Huamantla, Mexico
- Dates: 6–15 October

Champions
- Men: Czech Republic; Ondřej Perušič; David Schweiner
- Women: United States; Sara Hughes; Kelly Cheng

The 2023 Beach Volleyball World Championships was held in Tlaxcala, Apizaco, and Huamantla, Mexico from 6 to 15 October 2023.

== Competition schedule ==
P	Preliminary round	LL	Lucky losers playoffs	1/16	Round of 32	1/8	Round of 16	1/4	Quarter-finals	1/2	Semi-finals	B	Bronze medal match	F	Final

Date Event	Fri 6	Sat 7	Sun 8	Mon 9	Tue 10	Wed 11	Thu 12	Fri 13	Sat 14	Sun 15	
Men's tournament	P	P	P	P	LL	1/16	1/8	1/4	1/2	B	F
Women's tournament	P	P	P	P	LL	1/16	1/8	1/4	1/2	B	F

== Medal summary ==
=== Medal table ===
* Host nation (Mexico)

Rank	Nation	Gold	Silver	Bronze	Total
1	United States	1	0	1	2
2	Czech Republic	1	0	0	1
3	Brazil	0	1	0	1
3	Sweden	0	1	0	1
5	Poland	0	0	1	1
Totals (5 entries)		2	2	2	6

=== Medal events ===
Event	Gold	Silver	Bronze
Men	Czech Republic; Ondřej Perušič; David Schweiner	Sweden; David Åhman; Jonatan Hellvig	Poland; Bartosz Łosiak; Michał Bryl
Women	United States; Sara Hughes; Kelly Cheng	Brazil; Ana Patrícia Ramos; Duda Lisboa	United States; Kristen Nuss; Taryn Kloth

== Men's tournament ==
=== Knockout stage bracket ===
Round of 32
11 October
(Norway) A. Mol – Sørum	2
(Chile) M. Grimalt – E. Grimalt	0
11 October
(Argentina) N. Capogrosso – T. Capogrosso	0
(Italy) Cottafava – Nicolai	2
11 October
(Cuba) Alayo – Díaz	0
(Italy) Lupo – Rossi	2
11 October
(Czech Republic) Perušič – Schweiner	2
(Spain) Herrera – Gavira	0
11 October
(Austria) Seidl – Pristauz	1
(Brazil) Solberg – Carvalhaes	2
11 October
(Brazil) Evandro – Arthur	2
(Brazil) Vitor Felipe – Renato	0
11 October
(Canada) Schachter – Dearing	0
(Australia) Hodges – Schubert	2
11 October
(Australia) McHugh – Burnett	0
(United States) Crabb – Brunner	2
11 October
(United States) Partain – Benesh	2
(Poland) Kantor – Zdybek	0
11 October
(China) Halikejiang – Wu	0
(Italy) Ranghieri – Carambula	2
11 October
(Poland) Łosiak – Bryl	2
(Norway) H. Mol – Berntsen	0
11 October
(Austria) Hörl – Horst	0
(Germany) Ehlers – Wickler	2
11 October
(Qatar) Cherif – Ahmed	0
(Netherlands) Boermans – De Groot	2
11 October
(Ukraine) Popov – Reznik	0
(Netherlands) Immers – Van de Velde	2
11 October
(Netherlands) Brouwer – Meeuwsen	2
(Chile) Aravena – Droguett	1
11 October
(United States) Evans – Budinger	0
(Sweden) Åhman – Hellvig	2

Round of 16
12 October
(Norway) A. Mol – Sørum	2
(Italy) Cottafava – Nicolai	0
12 October
(Italy) Lupo – Rossi	0
(Czech Republic) Perušič – Schweiner	2
12 October
(Brazil) Solberg – Carvalhaes	2
(Brazil) Evandro – Arthur	1
12 October
(Australia) Hodges – Schubert	0
(United States) Crabb – Brunner	2
12 October
(United States) Partain – Benesh	2
(Italy) Ranghieri – Carambula	0
12 October
(Poland) Łosiak – Bryl	2
(Germany) Ehlers – Wickler	0
12 October
(Netherlands) Boermans – De Groot	2
(Netherlands) Immers – Van de Velde	1
12 October
(Netherlands) Brouwer – Meeuwsen	0
(Sweden) Åhman – Hellvig	2

Quarter-finals
13 October
(Norway) A. Mol – Sørum	1
(Czech Republic) Perušič – Schweiner	2
13 October
(Brazil) Solberg – Carvalhaes	0
(United States) Crabb – Brunner	2
13 October
(United States) Partain – Benesh	0
(Poland) Łosiak – Bryl	2
13 October
(Netherlands) Boermans – De Groot	1
(Sweden) Åhman – Hellvig	2

Semi-finals
14 October
(Czech Republic) Perušič – Schweiner	2
(United States) Crabb – Brunner	0
14 October
(Poland) Łosiak – Bryl	1
(Sweden) Åhman – Hellvig	2

Final
15 October
(Czech Republic) Perušič – Schweiner	2
(Sweden) Åhman – Hellvig	1
Third place
15 October
(United States) Crabb – Brunner	0
(Poland) Łosiak – Bryl	2

== Women's tournament ==
=== Knockout stage bracket ===
Round of 32
11 October
(Brazil) Ana Patrícia – Duda	2
(Lithuania) Paulikienė – Raupelytė	0
11 October
(China) Xue – Xia	2
(Thailand) Naraphornrapat – Worapeerachayakorn	0
11 October
(United States) Cannon – Kraft	2
(Brazil) Andressa – Vitória	1
11 October
(Spain) Álvarez – Moreno	0
(Netherlands) Stam – Schoon	2
11 October
(Australia) Mariafe – Clancy	2
(Germany) Ittlinger – Borger	0
11 October
(Italy) Gottardi – Menegatti	2
(Switzerland) Vergé-Dépré – Mäder	0
11 October
(Switzerland) Esmée – Zoé	2
(France) Placette – Richard	0
11 October
(Finland) Ahtiainen – Lahti	0
(Canada) Melissa – Brandie	2
11 October
(United States) Hughes – Cheng	2
(Austria) D. Klinger – R. Klinger	1
11 October
(Latvia) Tīna – Anastasija	2
(China) Dong – Wang	0
11 October
(Germany) Müller – Tillmann	2
(Spain) Liliana – Paula	0
11 October
(Brazil) Tainá – Victória	2
(Brazil) Carol – Bárbara	1
11 October
(Switzerland) Hüberli – Betschart	2
(Poland) Gruszczyńska – Wachowicz	0
11 October
(Czech Republic) Hermannová – Štochlová	0
(United States) Scoles – Flint	2
11 October
(Brazil) Ágatha – Rebecca	2
(Germany) Ludwig – Lippmann	1
11 October
(Canada) Pavan – McBain	0
(United States) Nuss – Kloth	2

Round of 16
12 October
(Brazil) Ana Patrícia – Duda	2
(China) Xue – Xia	0
12 October
(United States) Cannon – Kraft	0
(Netherlands) Stam – Schoon	2
12 October
(Australia) Mariafe – Clancy	2
(Italy) Gottardi – Menegatti	1
12 October
(Switzerland) Esmée – Zoé	0
(Canada) Melissa – Brandie	2
12 October
(United States) Hughes – Cheng	2
(Latvia) Tīna – Anastasija	1
12 October
(Germany) Müller – Tillmann	1
(Brazil) Tainá – Victória	2
12 October
(Switzerland) Hüberli – Betschart	2
(United States) Scoles – Flint	0
12 October
(Brazil) Ágatha – Rebecca	0
(United States) Nuss – Kloth	2

Quarter-finals
13 October
(Brazil) Ana Patrícia – Duda	2
(Netherlands) Stam – Schoon	0
13 October
(Australia) Mariafe – Clancy	2
(Canada) Melissa – Brandie	0
13 October
(United States) Hughes – Cheng	2
(Brazil) Tainá – Victória	0
13 October
(Switzerland) Hüberli – Betschart	1
(United States) Nuss – Kloth	2

Semi-finals
14 October
(Brazil) Ana Patrícia – Duda	2
(Australia) Mariafe – Clancy	0
14 October
(United States) Hughes – Cheng	2
(United States) Nuss – Kloth	1

Final
15 October
(Brazil) Ana Patrícia – Duda	0
(United States) Hughes – Cheng	2
Third place
15 October
(Australia) Mariafe – Clancy	1
(United States) Nuss – Kloth	2
