= 2023 Beach Volleyball World Championships – Women's tournament =

Tournament details
- Host country: Mexico
- Cities: Tlaxcala; Apizaco; Huamantla
- Dates: 6–15 October
- Teams: 48 (from 5 confederations)
- Venues: 4

Final positions
- Champions: United States; Sara Hughes; Kelly Cheng (1st title)
- Runners-up: Brazil; Ana Patrícia Ramos; Eduarda Santos Lisboa
- Third place: United States; Kristen Nuss; Taryn Kloth
- Fourth place: Australia; Mariafe Artacho del Solar; Taliqua Clancy

The women's tournament of the 2023 Beach Volleyball World Championships was held from 6 to 15 October 2023.

Sara Hughes and Kelly Cheng won their first tile after defeating Ana Patrícia Ramos and Eduarda Santos Lisboa in the final, while Kristen Nuss and Taryn Kloth won the bronze medal.

== Qualification ==
There were 48 teams qualified for the tournament.

== Schedule ==
The 48 teams were split into twelve pools, where the first two and the four best-third placed teams advanced to the knockout stage. The remaining eight third-ranked teams played in a lucky loser round to determine the last four teams. After that, a knockout system was used.

P	Preliminary round	LL	Lucky losers playoffs	1/16	Round of 32	1/8	Round of 16	1/4	Quarter-finals	1/2	Semi-finals	B	Bronze medal match	F	Final

Fri 6	Sat 7	Sun 8	Mon 9	Tue 10	Wed 11	Thu 12	Fri 13	Sat 14	Sun 15	
P	P	P	P	LL	1/16	1/8	1/4	1/2	B	F

== Preliminary round ==
The draw was held on 21 May 2022. If two teams were tied in points, the overall set and points ratio were used. If three teams were tied on points, the matches against those teams determined the ranking.

All times are local (UTC−6).

=== Pool A ===
Pos	Team	Pld	W	L	Pts	SW	SL	SR	SPW	SPL	SPR	Qualification
1	(Brazil) Ana Patrícia – Duda	3	3	0	6	6	0	MAX	126	78	1.615	Round of 32
2	(France) Placette – Richard	3	2	1	5	4	2	2.000	112	97	1.155	Round of 32
3	(Finland) Ahtiainen – Lahti	3	1	2	4	2	4	0.500	102	104	0.981	Lucky loser playoffs
4	(Chile) Rivas – Chris	3	0	3	3	0	6	0.000	65	126	0.516	

Source: FIVB

7 October 2023; 09:00	Placette – Richard (France)	2–0	(Finland) Ahtiainen – Lahti	Plazas de Toros Huamantla; Referees: Suzanne Lowry (USA), Giovanni Bake (RSA)
7 October 2023; 09:00	(21–17, 21–15); Report			Plazas de Toros Huamantla; Referees: Suzanne Lowry (USA), Giovanni Bake (RSA)

7 October 2023; 10:00	Ana Patrícia – Duda (Brazil)	2–0	(Chile) Rivas – Chris	Plazas de Toros Huamantla; Referees: Robert Leko (SRB), Carlos Rivera (PUR)
7 October 2023; 10:00	(21–5, 21–17); Report			Plazas de Toros Huamantla; Referees: Robert Leko (SRB), Carlos Rivera (PUR)

8 October 2023; 10:00	Placette – Richard (France)	2–0	(Chile) Rivas – Chris	Plazas de Toros Huamantla; Referees: Giovanni Bake (RSA), Carlos Rivera (PUR)
8 October 2023; 10:00	(21–10, 21–13); Report			Plazas de Toros Huamantla; Referees: Giovanni Bake (RSA), Carlos Rivera (PUR)

8 October 2023; 11:00	Ana Patrícia – Duda (Brazil)	2–0	(Finland) Ahtiainen – Lahti	Plazas de Toros Huamantla; Referees: Suzanne Lowry (USA), Juan Saavedra (COL)
8 October 2023; 11:00	(21–14, 21–14); Report			Plazas de Toros Huamantla; Referees: Suzanne Lowry (USA), Juan Saavedra (COL)

9 October 2023; 10:00	Ahtiainen – Lahti (Finland)	2–0	(Chile) Rivas – Chris	Plazas de Toros Huamantla; Referees: Carlos Rivera (PUR), Robert Leko (SRB)
9 October 2023; 10:00	(21–10, 21–10); Report			Plazas de Toros Huamantla; Referees: Carlos Rivera (PUR), Robert Leko (SRB)

9 October 2023; 11:00	Ana Patrícia – Duda (Brazil)	2–0	(France) Placette – Richard	Plazas de Toros Huamantla; Referees: Suzanne Lowry (USA), Giovanni Bake (RSA)
9 October 2023; 11:00	(21–16, 21–12); Report			Plazas de Toros Huamantla; Referees: Suzanne Lowry (USA), Giovanni Bake (RSA)

=== Pool B ===
Pos	Team	Pld	W	L	Pts	SW	SL	SR	SPW	SPL	SPR	Qualification
1	(United States) Nuss – Kloth	3	3	0	6	6	0	MAX	126	91	1.385	Round of 32
2	(Brazil) Andressa – Vitória	3	2	1	5	4	3	1.333	126	124	1.016	Round of 32
3	(Lithuania) Paulikienė – Raupelytė	3	1	2	4	3	4	0.750	125	131	0.954	Lucky loser playoffs
4	(Japan) Akiko – Yurika	3	0	3	3	0	6	0.000	104	135	0.770	

Source: FIVB

7 October 2023; 14:30	Andressa – Vitória (Brazil)	2–1	(Lithuania) Paulikienė – Raupelytė	Plazas de Toros Huamantla; Referees: Carlos Rivera (PUR), Robert Leko (SRB)
7 October 2023; 14:30	(21–13, 14–21, 15–13); Report			Plazas de Toros Huamantla; Referees: Carlos Rivera (PUR), Robert Leko (SRB)

7 October 2023; 15:30	Nuss – Kloth (United States)	2–0	(Japan) Akiko – Yurika	Plazas de Toros Huamantla; Referees: Juan Saavedra (COL), José Maria Padron (ESP)
7 October 2023; 15:30	(21–15, 21–15); Report			Plazas de Toros Huamantla; Referees: Juan Saavedra (COL), José Maria Padron (ESP)

8 October 2023; 16:30	Nuss – Kloth (United States)	2–0	(Lithuania) Paulikienė – Raupelytė	Plazas de Toros Huamantla; Referees: Robert Leko (SRB), José María Padrón (ESP)
8 October 2023; 16:30	(21–19, 21–15); Report			Plazas de Toros Huamantla; Referees: Robert Leko (SRB), José María Padrón (ESP)

8 October 2023; 19:00	Andressa – Vitória (Brazil)	2–0	(Japan) Akiko – Yurika	Plazas de Toros Huamantla; Referees: Giovanni Bake (RSA), Carlos Rivera (PUR)
8 October 2023; 19:00	(21–9, 28–26); Report			Plazas de Toros Huamantla; Referees: Giovanni Bake (RSA), Carlos Rivera (PUR)

9 October 2023; 14:30	Nuss – Kloth (United States)	2–0	(Brazil) Andressa – Vitória	Plazas de Toros Huamantla; Referees: Robert Leko (SRB), Carlos Rivera (PUR)
9 October 2023; 14:30	(21–13, 21–14); Report			Plazas de Toros Huamantla; Referees: Robert Leko (SRB), Carlos Rivera (PUR)

9 October 2023; 15:30	Paulikienė – Raupelytė (Lithuania)	2–0	(Japan) Akiko – Yurika	Plazas de Toros Huamantla; Referees: Giovanni Bake (RSA), Suzanne Lowry (USA)
9 October 2023; 15:30	(21–18, 23–21); Report			Plazas de Toros Huamantla; Referees: Giovanni Bake (RSA), Suzanne Lowry (USA)

=== Pool C ===
Pos	Team	Pld	W	L	Pts	SW	SL	SR	SPW	SPL	SPR	Qualification
1	(United States) Hughes – Cheng	3	2	1	5	4	2	2.000	121	88	1.375	Round of 32
2	(Brazil) Ágatha – Rebecca	3	2	1	5	5	2	2.500	138	111	1.243	Round of 32
3	(Germany) Ittlinger – Borger	3	2	1	5	4	3	1.333	125	112	1.116	Round of 32
4	(Mexico) Albarran – Vidaurrazaga	3	0	3	3	0	6	0.000	53	126	0.421	

Source: FIVB

6 October 2023; 16:30	Ágatha – Rebecca (Brazil)	1–2	(Germany) Ittlinger – Borger	Plazas de Toros Apizaco; Referees: Vincent Roche (FRA), Charalampos Papadogoulas (GRE)
6 October 2023; 16:30	(18–21, 21–18, 12–15); Report			Plazas de Toros Apizaco; Referees: Vincent Roche (FRA), Charalampos Papadogoulas (GRE)

6 October 2023; 19:00	Hughes – Cheng (United States)	2–0	(Mexico) Albarran – Vidaurrazaga	Plazas de Toros Apizaco; Referees: Agnieszka Myszkowska (POL), Rui Jorge Carvalho (POR)
6 October 2023; 19:00	(21–4, 21–10); Report			Plazas de Toros Apizaco; Referees: Agnieszka Myszkowska (POL), Rui Jorge Carvalho (POR)

7 October 2023; 19:00	Hughes – Cheng (United States)	2–0	(Germany) Ittlinger – Borger	Plazas de Toros Apizaco; Referees: Rui Jorge Carvalho (POR), Vincent Roche (FRA)
7 October 2023; 19:00	(21–17, 21–12); Report			Plazas de Toros Apizaco; Referees: Rui Jorge Carvalho (POR), Vincent Roche (FRA)

7 October 2023; 20:00	Ágatha – Rebecca (Brazil)	2–0	(Mexico) Albarran – Vidaurrazaga	Plazas de Toros Apizaco; Referees: Agnieszka Myszkowska (POL), Brigham Beatie (USA)
7 October 2023; 20:00	(21–6, 21–14); Report			Plazas de Toros Apizaco; Referees: Agnieszka Myszkowska (POL), Brigham Beatie (USA)

9 October 2023; 19:00	Ittlinger – Borger (Germany)	2–0	(Mexico) Albarran – Vidaurrazaga	Plazas de Toros Apizaco; Referees: Agnieszka Myszkowska (POL), Vincent Roche (FRA)
9 October 2023; 19:00	(21–12, 21–17); Report			Plazas de Toros Apizaco; Referees: Agnieszka Myszkowska (POL), Vincent Roche (FRA)

9 October 2023; 21:00	Hughes – Cheng (United States)	0–2	(Brazil) Ágatha – Rebecca	Plazas de Toros Apizaco; Referees: Davide Crescentini (ITA), Charalampos Papadogoulas (GRE)
9 October 2023; 21:00	(15–21, 22–24); Report			Plazas de Toros Apizaco; Referees: Davide Crescentini (ITA), Charalampos Papadogoulas (GRE)

=== Pool D ===
Pos	Team	Pld	W	L	Pts	SW	SL	SR	SPW	SPL	SPR	Qualification
1	(Canada) Melissa – Brandie	3	3	0	6	6	0	MAX	129	82	1.573	Round of 32
2	(Czech Republic) Hermannová – Štochlová	3	2	1	5	4	3	1.333	134	114	1.175	Round of 32
3	(Paraguay) Erika – Michelle	3	1	2	4	3	4	0.750	115	131	0.878	Lucky loser playoffs
4	(Morocco) Yakki – Mahassine	3	0	3	3	0	6	0.000	79	130	0.608	

Source: FIVB

7 October 2023; 10:00	Hermannová – Štochlová (Czech Republic)	2–1	(Paraguay) Erika – Michelle	Plazas de Toros Apizaco; Referees: Rui Carvalho (POR), Vincent Roche (FRA)
7 October 2023; 10:00	(21–14, 17–21, 15–10); Report			Plazas de Toros Apizaco; Referees: Rui Carvalho (POR), Vincent Roche (FRA)

7 October 2023; 16:30	Melissa – Brandie (Canada)	2–0	(Morocco) Yakki – Mahassine	Plazas de Toros Apizaco; Referees: Charalampos Papadogoulas (GRE), Davide Crescentini (ITA)
7 October 2023; 16:30	(21–9, 21–10); Report			Plazas de Toros Apizaco; Referees: Charalampos Papadogoulas (GRE), Davide Crescentini (ITA)

8 October 2023; 10:00	Hermannová – Štochlová (Czech Republic)	2–0	(Morocco) Yakki – Mahassine	Plazas de Toros Apizaco; Referees: Agnieszka Myszkowska (POL), Rui Carvalho (POR)
8 October 2023; 10:00	(21–14, 21–10); Report			Plazas de Toros Apizaco; Referees: Agnieszka Myszkowska (POL), Rui Carvalho (POR)

8 October 2023; 19:00	Melissa – Brandie (Canada)	2–0	(Paraguay) Erika – Michelle	Plazas de Toros Apizaco; Referees: Agnieszka Myszkowska (POL), Rui Carvalho (POR)
8 October 2023; 19:00	(21–14, 21–10); Report			Plazas de Toros Apizaco; Referees: Agnieszka Myszkowska (POL), Rui Carvalho (POR)

9 October 2023; 14:30	Melissa – Brandie (Canada)	2–0	(Czech Republic) Hermannová – Štochlová	Plazas de Toros Apizaco; Referees: Vincent Roche (FRA), Agnieszka Myszkowska (POL)
9 October 2023; 14:30	(21–17, 24–22); Report			Plazas de Toros Apizaco; Referees: Vincent Roche (FRA), Agnieszka Myszkowska (POL)

9 October 2023; 15:30	Erika – Michelle (Paraguay)	2–0	(Morocco) Yakki – Mahassine	Plazas de Toros Apizaco; Referees: Rui Carvalho (POR), Vincent Roche (FRA)
9 October 2023; 15:30	(25–21, 21–13); Report			Plazas de Toros Apizaco; Referees: Rui Carvalho (POR), Vincent Roche (FRA)

=== Pool E ===
Pos	Team	Pld	W	L	Pts	SW	SL	SR	SPW	SPL	SPR	Qualification
1	(Australia) Mariafe – Clancy	3	3	0	6	6	1	6.000	137	106	1.292	Round of 32
2	(Spain) Liliana – Paula	3	2	1	5	5	3	1.667	143	132	1.083	Round of 32
3	(Poland) Gruszczyńska – Wachowicz	3	1	2	4	3	4	0.750	132	127	1.039	Round of 32
4	(Dominican Republic) Almánzar – Payano	3	0	3	3	0	6	0.000	79	126	0.627	

Source: FIVB

7 October 2023; 09:00	Gruszczyńska – Wachowicz (Poland)	1–2	(Spain) Liliana – Paula	Plazas de Toros Apizaco; Referees: Charalampos Papadogoulas (GRE), Davide Crescentini (ITA)
7 October 2023; 09:00	(25–27, 21–15, 10–15); Report			Plazas de Toros Apizaco; Referees: Charalampos Papadogoulas (GRE), Davide Crescentini (ITA)

7 October 2023; 15:30	Mariafe – Clancy (Australia)	2–0	(Dominican Republic) Almánzar – Payano	Plazas de Toros Apizaco; Referees: Brigham Beatie (USA), Agnieszka Myszkowska (POL)
7 October 2023; 15:30	(21–16, 21–12); Report			Plazas de Toros Apizaco; Referees: Brigham Beatie (USA), Agnieszka Myszkowska (POL)

8 October 2023; 09:00	Gruszczyńska – Wachowicz (Poland)	2–0	(Dominican Republic) Almánzar – Payano	Plazas de Toros Apizaco; Referees: Brigham Beatie (USA), Charalampos Papadogoulas (GRE)
8 October 2023; 09:00	(21–15, 21–13); Report			Plazas de Toros Apizaco; Referees: Brigham Beatie (USA), Charalampos Papadogoulas (GRE)

8 October 2023; 15:30	Mariafe – Clancy (Australia)	2–1	(Spain) Liliana – Paula	Plazas de Toros Apizaco; Referees: Davide Crescentini (ITA), Vincent Roche (FRA)
8 October 2023; 15:30	(17–21, 21–17, 15–6); Report			Plazas de Toros Apizaco; Referees: Davide Crescentini (ITA), Vincent Roche (FRA)

9 October 2023; 09:00	Mariafe – Clancy (Australia)	2–0	(Poland) Gruszczyńska – Wachowicz	Plazas de Toros Apizaco; Referees: Charalampos Papadogoulas (GRE), Davide Crescentini (ITA)
9 October 2023; 09:00	(21–18, 21–16); Report			Plazas de Toros Apizaco; Referees: Charalampos Papadogoulas (GRE), Davide Crescentini (ITA)

9 October 2023; 10:00	Liliana – Paula (Spain)	2–0	(Dominican Republic) Almánzar – Payano	Plazas de Toros Apizaco; Referees: Agnieszka Myszkowska (POL), Vincent Roche (FRA)
9 October 2023; 10:00	(21–9, 21–14); Report			Plazas de Toros Apizaco; Referees: Agnieszka Myszkowska (POL), Vincent Roche (FRA)

=== Pool F ===
Pos	Team	Pld	W	L	Pts	SW	SL	SR	SPW	SPL	SPR	Qualification
1	(Brazil) Carol – Bárbara	3	3	0	6	6	1	6.000	145	118	1.229	Round of 32
2	(Germany) Ludwig – Lippmann	3	2	1	5	4	2	2.000	119	88	1.352	Round of 32
3	(Japan) Ishii – Mizoe	3	1	2	4	2	4	0.500	92	120	0.767	Lucky loser playoffs
4	(Italy) Bianchin – Scampoli	3	0	3	3	1	6	0.167	115	145	0.793	

Source: FIVB

6 October 2023; 16:30	Carol – Bárbara (Brazil)	2–1	(Italy) Bianchin – Scampoli	Plaza de la Constitución Tlaxcala; Referees: Wang Lijun (CHN), Mariko Satomi (JPN)
6 October 2023; 16:30	(23–21, 23–25, 15–9); Report			Plaza de la Constitución Tlaxcala; Referees: Wang Lijun (CHN), Mariko Satomi (JPN)

6 October 2023; 16:30	Ludwig – Lippmann (Germany)	2–0	(Japan) Ishii – Mizoe	Plazas de Toros Tlaxcala; Referees: Osvaldo Sumavil (ARG), Jean Mukundiyukuri (RWA)
6 October 2023; 16:30	(21–12, 21–10); Report			Plazas de Toros Tlaxcala; Referees: Osvaldo Sumavil (ARG), Jean Mukundiyukuri (RWA)

7 October 2023; 19:00	Carol – Bárbara (Brazil)	2–0	(Japan) Ishii – Mizoe	Plazas de Toros Tlaxcala; Referees: Sylvain Druart (FRA), Marlene Hernández (MEX)
7 October 2023; 19:00	(21–19, 21–9); Report			Plazas de Toros Tlaxcala; Referees: Sylvain Druart (FRA), Marlene Hernández (MEX)

7 October 2023; 19:00	Ludwig – Lippmann (Germany)	2–0	(Italy) Bianchin – Scampoli	Plaza de la Constitución Tlaxcala; Referees: Jean Mukundiyukuri (RWA), Brian Hiebert (CAN)
7 October 2023; 19:00	(21–12, 21–12); Report			Plaza de la Constitución Tlaxcala; Referees: Jean Mukundiyukuri (RWA), Brian Hiebert (CAN)

9 October 2023; 11:00	Carol – Bárbara (Brazil)	2–0	(Germany) Ludwig – Lippmann	Plazas de Toros Tlaxcala; Referees: Milán Vachutka (CZE), Sylvain Druart (FRA)
9 October 2023; 11:00	(21–19, 21–16); Report			Plazas de Toros Tlaxcala; Referees: Milán Vachutka (CZE), Sylvain Druart (FRA)

9 October 2023; 11:00	Ishii – Mizoe (Japan)	2–0	(Italy) Bianchin – Scampoli	Plaza de la Constitución Tlaxcala; Referees: Giseli Amantino (BRA), Brian Hiebert (CAN)
9 October 2023; 11:00	(21–18, 21–18); Report			Plaza de la Constitución Tlaxcala; Referees: Giseli Amantino (BRA), Brian Hiebert (CAN)

=== Pool G ===
Pos	Team	Pld	W	L	Pts	SW	SL	SR	SPW	SPL	SPR	Qualification
1	(Switzerland) Hüberli – Betschart	3	3	0	6	6	1	6.000	144	121	1.190	Round of 32
2	(Latvia) Tīna – Anastasija	3	2	1	5	5	2	2.500	142	116	1.224	Round of 32
3	(Ecuador) Ariana – Karelys	3	1	2	4	2	4	0.500	97	119	0.815	Lucky loser playoffs
4	(Argentina) Gallay – Pereyra	3	0	3	3	0	6	0.000	99	126	0.786	

Source: FIVB

7 October 2023; 09:00	Hüberli – Betschart (Switzerland)	2–0	(Ecuador) Ariana – Karelys	Plazas de Toros Tlaxcala; Referees: Marlene Hernández (MEX), Nina Hobi (AUT)
7 October 2023; 09:00	(21–19, 21–11); Report			Plazas de Toros Tlaxcala; Referees: Marlene Hernández (MEX), Nina Hobi (AUT)

7 October 2023; 09:00	Tīna – Anastasija (Latvia)	2–0	(Argentina) Gallay – Pereyra	Plaza de la Constitución Tlaxcala; Referees: Brian Hiebert (CAN), Jean Mukundiyukuri (RWA)
7 October 2023; 09:00	(21–17, 21–14); Report			Plaza de la Constitución Tlaxcala; Referees: Brian Hiebert (CAN), Jean Mukundiyukuri (RWA)

8 October 2023; 11:00	Hüberli – Betschart (Switzerland)	2–0	(Argentina) Gallay – Pereyra	Plazas de Toros Tlaxcala; Referees: Lisandro dos Santos (BRA), Mariko Satomi (JPN)
8 October 2023; 11:00	(21–18, 21–15); Report			Plazas de Toros Tlaxcala; Referees: Lisandro dos Santos (BRA), Mariko Satomi (JPN)

8 October 2023; 11:00	Tīna – Anastasija (Latvia)	2–0	(Ecuador) Ariana – Karelys	Plaza de la Constitución Tlaxcala; Referees: Sylvain Druart (FRA), Emanuel Batani (MEX)
8 October 2023; 11:00	(21–11, 21–14); Report			Plaza de la Constitución Tlaxcala; Referees: Sylvain Druart (FRA), Emanuel Batani (MEX)

9 October 2023; 12:00	Hüberli – Betschart (Switzerland)	2–1	(Latvia) Tīna – Anastasija	Plazas de Toros Tlaxcala; Referees: Marlene Hernández (MEX), Wang Lijun (CHN)
9 October 2023; 12:00	(21–19, 23–25, 16–14); Report			Plazas de Toros Tlaxcala; Referees: Marlene Hernández (MEX), Wang Lijun (CHN)

9 October 2023; 12:00	Gallay – Pereyra (Argentina)	0–2	(Ecuador) Ariana – Karelys	Plaza de la Constitución Tlaxcala; Referees: Mariko Satomi (JPN), Jean Mukundiyukuri (RWA)
9 October 2023; 12:00	(19–21, 16–21); Report			Plaza de la Constitución Tlaxcala; Referees: Mariko Satomi (JPN), Jean Mukundiyukuri (RWA)

=== Pool H ===
Pos	Team	Pld	W	L	Pts	SW	SL	SR	SPW	SPL	SPR	Qualification
1	(Netherlands) Stam – Schoon	3	2	1	5	4	3	1.333	133	114	1.167	Round of 32
2	(Switzerland) Esmée – Zoé	3	2	1	5	5	2	2.500	138	122	1.131	Round of 32
3	(Canada) Pavan – McBain	3	1	2	4	3	4	0.750	119	126	0.944	Lucky loser playoffs
4	(Puerto Rico) Navas – González	3	1	2	4	2	5	0.400	110	138	0.797	

Source: FIVB

7 October 2023; 10:00	Stam – Schoon (Netherlands)	2–0	(Puerto Rico) Navas – González	Plazas de Toros Tlaxcala; Referees: Lisandro dos Santos (BRA), Milán Vachutka (CZE)
7 October 2023; 10:00	(21–11, 21–18); Report			Plazas de Toros Tlaxcala; Referees: Lisandro dos Santos (BRA), Milán Vachutka (CZE)

7 October 2023; 10:00	Esmée – Zoé (Switzerland)	2–0	(Canada) Pavan – McBain	Plaza de la Constitución Tlaxcala; Referees: Mariko Satomi (JPN), Giseli Amantino (BRA)
7 October 2023; 10:00	(21–19, 21–15); Report			Plaza de la Constitución Tlaxcala; Referees: Mariko Satomi (JPN), Giseli Amantino (BRA)

8 October 2023; 12:00	Stam – Schoon (Netherlands)	2–1	(Canada) Pavan – McBain	Plazas de Toros Tlaxcala; Referees: Wang Lijun (CHN), Giseli Amantino (BRA)
8 October 2023; 12:00	(21–15, 17–21, 15–7); Report			Plazas de Toros Tlaxcala; Referees: Wang Lijun (CHN), Giseli Amantino (BRA)

8 October 2023; 12:00	Esmée – Zoé (Switzerland)	1–2	(Puerto Rico) Navas – González	Plaza de la Constitución Tlaxcala; Referees: Milán Vachutka (CZE), Nina Hobi (AUT)
8 October 2023; 12:00	(21–13, 20–22, 13–15); Report			Plaza de la Constitución Tlaxcala; Referees: Milán Vachutka (CZE), Nina Hobi (AUT)

9 October 2023; 14:30	Stam – Schoon (Netherlands)	0–2	(Switzerland) Esmée – Zoé	Plazas de Toros Tlaxcala; Referees: Osvaldo Sumavil (ARG), Emanuel Batani (MEX)
9 October 2023; 14:30	(19–21, 19–21); Report			Plazas de Toros Tlaxcala; Referees: Osvaldo Sumavil (ARG), Emanuel Batani (MEX)

9 October 2023; 14:30	Pavan – McBain (Canada)	2–0	(Puerto Rico) Navas – González	Plaza de la Constitución Tlaxcala; Referees: Sylvain Druart (FRA), Nina Hobi (AUT)
9 October 2023; 14:30	(21–19, 21–12); Report			Plaza de la Constitución Tlaxcala; Referees: Sylvain Druart (FRA), Nina Hobi (AUT)

=== Pool I ===
Pos	Team	Pld	W	L	Pts	SW	SL	SR	SPW	SPL	SPR	Qualification
1	(United States) Cannon – Kraft	3	2	1	5	4	2	2.000	127	114	1.114	Round of 32
2	(China) Xue – Xia	3	2	1	5	4	2	2.000	94	75	1.253	Round of 32
3	(Spain) Álvarez – Moreno	3	2	1	5	4	2	2.000	102	114	0.895	Round of 32
4	(Mexico) Torres – Rivera	3	0	3	3	0	6	0.000	83	127	0.654	

Source: FIVB

6 October 2023; 16:30	Cannon – Kraft (United States)	0–2	(Spain) Álvarez – Moreno	Plazas de Toros Huamantla; Referees: Juan Saavedra (COL), Carlos Rivera (PUR)
6 October 2023; 16:30	(26–28, 15–21); Report			Plazas de Toros Huamantla; Referees: Juan Saavedra (COL), Carlos Rivera (PUR)

6 October 2023; 19:00	Xue – Xia (China)	2–0	(Mexico) Torres – Rivera	Plazas de Toros Huamantla; Referees: José María Padrón (ESP), Giovanni Bake (RSA)
6 October 2023; 19:00	(21–12, 21–9); Report			Plazas de Toros Huamantla; Referees: José María Padrón (ESP), Giovanni Bake (RSA)

7 October 2023; 20:00	Cannon – Kraft (United States)	2–0	(Mexico) Torres – Rivera	Plazas de Toros Huamantla; Referees: José María Padrón (ESP), Juan Saavedra (COL)
7 October 2023; 20:00	(21–11, 22–20); Report			Plazas de Toros Huamantla; Referees: José María Padrón (ESP), Juan Saavedra (COL)

7 October 2023; 21:00	Xue – Xia (China)	2–0	(Spain) Álvarez – Moreno	Plazas de Toros Huamantla; Referees: Giovanni Bake (RSA), Suzanne Lowry (USA)
7 October 2023; 21:00	(21–11, 21–0); Report			Plazas de Toros Huamantla; Referees: Giovanni Bake (RSA), Suzanne Lowry (USA)

9 October 2023; 19:00	Álvarez – Moreno (Spain)	2–0	(Mexico) Torres – Rivera	Plazas de Toros Huamantla; Referees: Carlos Rivera (PUR), Robert Leko (SRB)
9 October 2023; 19:00	(21–16, 21–15); Report			Plazas de Toros Huamantla; Referees: Carlos Rivera (PUR), Robert Leko (SRB)

9 October 2023; 21:00	Xue – Xia (China)	0–2	(United States) Cannon – Kraft	Plazas de Toros Huamantla; Referees: José María Padron (ESP), Juan Saavedra (COL)
9 October 2023; 21:00	(20–22, 14–21); Report			Plazas de Toros Huamantla; Referees: José María Padron (ESP), Juan Saavedra (COL)

=== Pool J ===
Pos	Team	Pld	W	L	Pts	SW	SL	SR	SPW	SPL	SPR	Qualification
1	(United States) Scoles – Flint	3	3	0	6	6	0	MAX	126	78	1.615	Round of 32
2	(Italy) Gottardi – Menegatti	3	2	1	5	4	3	1.333	128	100	1.280	Round of 32
3	(Austria) D. Klinger – R. Klinger	3	1	2	4	3	4	0.750	113	127	0.890	Lucky loser playoffs
4	(Costa Rica) Quesada – Williams	3	0	3	3	0	6	0.000	64	126	0.508	

Source: FIVB

7 October 2023; 15:30	Gottardi – Menegatti (Italy)	2–0	(Costa Rica) Quesada – Williams	Plazas de Toros Tlaxcala; Referees: Nina Hobi (AUT), Wang Lijun (CHN)
7 October 2023; 15:30	(21–9, 21–9); Report			Plazas de Toros Tlaxcala; Referees: Nina Hobi (AUT), Wang Lijun (CHN)

7 October 2023; 15:30	Scoles – Flint (United States)	2–0	(Austria) D. Klinger – R. Klinger	Plaza de la Constitución Tlaxcala; Referees: Jean Mukundiyukuri (RWA), Lisandro dos Santos (BRA)
7 October 2023; 15:30	(21–17, 21–14); Report			Plaza de la Constitución Tlaxcala; Referees: Jean Mukundiyukuri (RWA), Lisandro dos Santos (BRA)

8 October 2023; 19:00	Gottardi – Menegatti (Italy)	2–1	(Austria) D. Klinger – R. Klinger	Plazas de Toros Tlaxcala; Referees: Lisandro Santos (BRA), Wang Lijun (CHN)
8 October 2023; 19:00	(21–19, 18–21, 15–10); Report			Plazas de Toros Tlaxcala; Referees: Lisandro Santos (BRA), Wang Lijun (CHN)

8 October 2023; 19:00	Scoles – Flint (United States)	2–0	(Costa Rica) Quesada – Williams	Plaza de la Constitución Tlaxcala; Referees: Emanuel Batani (MEX), Jean Mukundiyukuri (RWA)
8 October 2023; 19:00	(21–4, 21–11); Report			Plaza de la Constitución Tlaxcala; Referees: Emanuel Batani (MEX), Jean Mukundiyukuri (RWA)

9 October 2023; 15:30	Gottardi – Menegatti (Italy)	0–2	(United States) Scoles – Flint	Plazas de Toros Tlaxcala; Referees: Giseli Amantino (BRA), Brian Hiebert (CAN)
9 October 2023; 15:30	(14–21, 18–21); Report			Plazas de Toros Tlaxcala; Referees: Giseli Amantino (BRA), Brian Hiebert (CAN)

9 October 2023; 15:30	D. Klinger – R. Klinger (Austria)	2–0	(Costa Rica) Quesada – Williams	Plaza de la Constitución Tlaxcala; Referees: Wang Lijun (CHN), Lisandro dos Santos (BRA)
9 October 2023; 15:30	(21–16, 21–15); Report			Plaza de la Constitución Tlaxcala; Referees: Wang Lijun (CHN), Lisandro dos Santos (BRA)

=== Pool K ===
Pos	Team	Pld	W	L	Pts	SW	SL	SR	SPW	SPL	SPR	Qualification
1	(Germany) Müller – Tillmann	3	2	1	5	4	3	1.333	137	126	1.087	Round of 32
2	(China) Dong – Wang	3	2	1	5	4	2	2.000	113	115	0.983	Round of 32
3	(Brazil) Tainá – Victória	3	1	2	4	3	4	0.750	131	134	0.978	Round of 32
4	(United States) Alix – Harward	3	1	2	4	2	4	0.500	115	121	0.950	

Source: FIVB

7 October 2023; 14:30	Müller – Tillmann (Germany)	0–2	(United States) Alix – Harward	Plazas de Toros Tlaxcala; Referees: Giseli Amantino (BRA), Mariko Satomi (JPN)
7 October 2023; 14:30	(23–25, 14–21); Report			Plazas de Toros Tlaxcala; Referees: Giseli Amantino (BRA), Mariko Satomi (JPN)

7 October 2023; 14:30	Tainá – Victória (Brazil)	0–2	(China) Dong – Wang	Plaza de la Constitución Tlaxcala; Referees: Sylvain Druart (FRA), Marlene Hernández (MEX)
7 October 2023; 14:30	(19–21, 19–21); Report			Plaza de la Constitución Tlaxcala; Referees: Sylvain Druart (FRA), Marlene Hernández (MEX)

8 October 2023; 14:30	Müller – Tillmann (Germany)	2–0	(China) Dong – Wang	Plazas de Toros Tlaxcala; Referees: Jean Mukundiyukuri (RWA), Marlene Hernández (MEX)
8 October 2023; 14:30	(21–13, 21–16); Report			Plazas de Toros Tlaxcala; Referees: Jean Mukundiyukuri (RWA), Marlene Hernández (MEX)

8 October 2023; 14:30	Tainá – Victória (Brazil)	2–0	(United States) Alix – Harward	Plaza de la Constitución Tlaxcala; Referees: Mariko Satomi (JPN), Sylvain Druart (FRA)
8 October 2023; 14:30	(21–17, 21–17); Report			Plaza de la Constitución Tlaxcala; Referees: Mariko Satomi (JPN), Sylvain Druart (FRA)

9 October 2023; 21:00	Müller – Tillmann (Germany)	2–1	(Brazil) Tainá – Victória	Plazas de Toros Tlaxcala; Referees: Milán Vachutka (CZE), Sylvain Druart (FRA)
9 October 2023; 21:00	(21–15, 22–24, 15–12); Report			Plazas de Toros Tlaxcala; Referees: Milán Vachutka (CZE), Sylvain Druart (FRA)

9 October 2023; 21:00	Dong – Wang (China)	2–0	(United States) Alix – Harward	Plaza de la Constitución Tlaxcala; Referees: Lisandro dos Santos (BRA), Marlene Hernández (MEX)
9 October 2023; 21:00	(21–16, 21–19); Report			Plaza de la Constitución Tlaxcala; Referees: Lisandro dos Santos (BRA), Marlene Hernández (MEX)

=== Pool L ===
Pos	Team	Pld	W	L	Pts	SW	SL	SR	SPW	SPL	SPR	Qualification
1	(Switzerland) Vergé-Dépré – Mäder	3	3	0	6	6	1	6.000	142	94	1.511	Round of 32
2	(Thailand) Naraphornrapat – Worapeerachayakorn	3	2	1	5	5	2	2.500	135	118	1.144	Round of 32
3	(Mexico) Gutiérrez – Flores	3	1	2	4	2	4	0.500	95	100	0.950	Lucky loser playoffs
4	(Mozambique) Vanessa – Sinaportar	3	0	3	3	0	6	0.000	66	126	0.524	

Source: FIVB

6 October 2023; 20:00	Gutiérrez – Flores (Mexico)	2–0	(Mozambique) Vanessa – Sinaportar	Plazas de Toros Tlaxcala; Referees: Giseli Amantino (BRA), Brian Hiebert (CAN)
6 October 2023; 20:00	(21–8, 21–8); Report			Plazas de Toros Tlaxcala; Referees: Giseli Amantino (BRA), Brian Hiebert (CAN)

6 October 2023; 20:00	Vergé-Dépré – Mäder (Switzerland)	2–1	(Thailand) Naraphornrapat – Worapeerachayakorn	Plaza de la Constitución Tlaxcala; Referees: Jean Mukundiyukuri (RWA), Marlene Hernández (MEX)
6 October 2023; 20:00	(22–24, 21–15, 15–12); Report			Plaza de la Constitución Tlaxcala; Referees: Jean Mukundiyukuri (RWA), Marlene Hernández (MEX)

7 October 2023; 20:00	Gutiérrez – Flores (Mexico)	0–2	(Thailand) Naraphornrapat – Worapeerachayakorn	Plazas de Toros Tlaxcala; Referees: Wang Lijun (CHN), Lisandro dos Santos (BRA)
7 October 2023; 20:00	(15–21, 17–21); Report			Plazas de Toros Tlaxcala; Referees: Wang Lijun (CHN), Lisandro dos Santos (BRA)

7 October 2023; 20:00	Vergé-Dépré – Mäder (Switzerland)	2–0	(Mozambique) Vanessa – Sinaportar	Plaza de la Constitución Tlaxcala; Referees: Emanuel Batani (MEX), Giseli Amantino (BRA)
7 October 2023; 20:00	(21–11, 21–11); Report			Plaza de la Constitución Tlaxcala; Referees: Emanuel Batani (MEX), Giseli Amantino (BRA)

9 October 2023; 19:00	Gutiérrez – Flores (Mexico)	0–2	(Switzerland) Vergé-Dépré – Mäder	Plazas de Toros Tlaxcala; Referees: Sylvain Druart (FRA), Nina Hobi (AUT)
9 October 2023; 19:00	(6–21, 15–21); Report			Plazas de Toros Tlaxcala; Referees: Sylvain Druart (FRA), Nina Hobi (AUT)

9 October 2023; 19:00	Naraphornrapat – Worapeerachayakorn (Thailand)	2–0	(Mozambique) Vanessa – Sinaportar	Plaza de la Constitución Tlaxcala; Referees: Marlene Hernández (MEX), Wang Lijun (CHN)
9 October 2023; 19:00	(21–15, 21–13); Report			Plaza de la Constitución Tlaxcala; Referees: Marlene Hernández (MEX), Wang Lijun (CHN)

=== Ranking of third-placed teams ===
Pos	Grp	Team	Pld	W	L	Pts	SW	SL	SR	SPW	SPL	SPR	Qualification
1	I	(Spain) Álvarez – Moreno	3	2	1	5	4	2	2.000	102	114	0.895	Round of 32
2	C	(Germany) Ittlinger – Borger	3	2	1	5	4	3	1.333	125	112	1.116	Round of 32
3	E	(Poland) Gruszczyńska – Wachowicz	3	1	2	4	3	4	0.750	132	127	1.039	Round of 32
4	K	(Brazil) Tainá – Victória	3	1	2	4	3	4	0.750	131	134	0.978	Round of 32
5	B	(Lithuania) Paulikienė – Raupelytė	3	1	2	4	3	4	0.750	125	131	0.954	Lucky losers playoffs
6	H	(Canada) Pavan – McBain	3	1	2	4	3	4	0.750	119	126	0.944	Lucky losers playoffs
7	J	(Austria) D. Klinger – R. Klinger	3	1	2	4	3	4	0.750	113	127	0.890	Lucky losers playoffs
8	D	(Paraguay) Erika – Michelle	3	1	2	4	3	4	0.750	115	131	0.878	Lucky losers playoffs
9	A	(Finland) Ahtiainen – Lahti	3	1	2	4	2	4	0.500	102	104	0.981	Lucky losers playoffs
10	L	(Mexico) Gutiérrez – Flores	3	1	2	4	2	4	0.500	95	100	0.950	Lucky losers playoffs
11	G	(Ecuador) Ariana – Karelys	3	1	2	4	2	4	0.500	97	119	0.815	Lucky losers playoffs
12	F	(Japan) Ishii – Mizoe	3	1	2	4	2	4	0.500	92	120	0.767	Lucky losers playoffs

Source: FIVB

=== Lucky losers playoffs ===
10 October 2023; 15:00	Pavan – McBain (Canada)	2–0	(Ecuador) Ariana – Karelys	Plaza de la Constitución Tlaxcala; Referees: Wang Lijun (CHN), Marlene Hernández (MEX)
10 October 2023; 15:00	(21–13, 21–10); Report			Plaza de la Constitución Tlaxcala; Referees: Wang Lijun (CHN), Marlene Hernández (MEX)

10 October 2023; 15:00	Erika – Michelle (Paraguay)	1–2	(Finland) Ahtiainen – Lahti	Plazas de Toros Tlaxcala; Referees: Davide Crescentini (ITA), Agnieszka Myszkowska (POL)
10 October 2023; 15:00	(21–18, 17–21, 9–15); Report			Plazas de Toros Tlaxcala; Referees: Davide Crescentini (ITA), Agnieszka Myszkowska (POL)

10 October 2023; 16:00	Paulikienė – Raupelytė (Lithuania)	2–0	(Japan) Ishii – Mizoe	Plazas de Toros Tlaxcala; Referees: Rui Jorge Carvalho (POR), Brigham Beatie (USA)
10 October 2023; 16:00	(21–17, 21–17); Report			Plazas de Toros Tlaxcala; Referees: Rui Jorge Carvalho (POR), Brigham Beatie (USA)

10 October 2023; 16:00	D. Klinger – R. Klinger (Austria)	2–1	(Mexico) Gutiérrez – Flores	Plaza de la Constitución Tlaxcala; Referees: Giseli Amantino (BRA), Mariko Satomi (JPN)
10 October 2023; 16:00	(21–18, 19–21, 15–10); Report			Plaza de la Constitución Tlaxcala; Referees: Giseli Amantino (BRA), Mariko Satomi (JPN)

== Knockout stage ==
=== Bracket ===
Round of 32
11 October
(Brazil) Ana Patrícia – Duda	2
(Lithuania) Paulikienė – Raupelytė	0
11 October
(China) Xue – Xia	2
(Thailand) Naraphornrapat – Worapeerachayakorn	0
11 October
(United States) Cannon – Kraft	2
(Brazil) Andressa – Vitória	1
11 October
(Spain) Álvarez – Moreno	0
(Netherlands) Stam – Schoon	2
11 October
(Australia) Mariafe – Clancy	2
(Germany) Ittlinger – Borger	0
11 October
(Italy) Gottardi – Menegatti	2
(Switzerland) Vergé-Dépré – Mäder	0
11 October
(Switzerland) Esmée – Zoé	2
(France) Placette – Richard	0
11 October
(Finland) Ahtiainen – Lahti	0
(Canada) Melissa – Brandie	2
11 October
(United States) Hughes – Cheng	2
(Austria) D. Klinger – R. Klinger	1
11 October
(Latvia) Tīna – Anastasija	2
(China) Dong – Wang	0
11 October
(Germany) Müller – Tillmann	2
(Spain) Liliana – Paula	0
11 October
(Brazil) Tainá – Victória	2
(Brazil) Carol – Bárbara	1
11 October
(Switzerland) Hüberli – Betschart	2
(Poland) Gruszczyńska – Wachowicz	0
11 October
(Czech Republic) Hermannová – Štochlová	0
(United States) Scoles – Flint	2
11 October
(Brazil) Ágatha – Rebecca	2
(Germany) Ludwig – Lippmann	1
11 October
(Canada) Pavan – McBain	0
(United States) Nuss – Kloth	2

Round of 16
12 October
(Brazil) Ana Patrícia – Duda	2
(China) Xue – Xia	0
12 October
(United States) Cannon – Kraft	0
(Netherlands) Stam – Schoon	2
12 October
(Australia) Mariafe – Clancy	2
(Italy) Gottardi – Menegatti	1
12 October
(Switzerland) Esmée – Zoé	0
(Canada) Melissa – Brandie	2
12 October
(United States) Hughes – Cheng	2
(Latvia) Tīna – Anastasija	1
12 October
(Germany) Müller – Tillmann	1
(Brazil) Tainá – Victória	2
12 October
(Switzerland) Hüberli – Betschart	2
(United States) Scoles – Flint	0
12 October
(Brazil) Ágatha – Rebecca	0
(United States) Nuss – Kloth	2

Quarter-finals
13 October
(Brazil) Ana Patrícia – Duda	2
(Netherlands) Stam – Schoon	0
13 October
(Australia) Mariafe – Clancy	2
(Canada) Melissa – Brandie	0
13 October
(United States) Hughes – Cheng	2
(Brazil) Tainá – Victória	0
13 October
(Switzerland) Hüberli – Betschart	1
(United States) Nuss – Kloth	2

Semi-finals
14 October
(Brazil) Ana Patrícia – Duda	2
(Australia) Mariafe – Clancy	0
14 October
(United States) Hughes – Cheng	2
(United States) Nuss – Kloth	1

Final
15 October
(Brazil) Ana Patrícia – Duda	0
(United States) Hughes – Cheng	2
Third place
15 October
(Australia) Mariafe – Clancy	1
(United States) Nuss – Kloth	2

=== Round of 32 ===
11 October 2023; 13:00	Álvarez – Moreno (Spain)	0–2	(Netherlands) Stam – Schoon	Plazas de Toros Huamantla; Referees: Giovanni Bake (RSA), Suzanne Lowry (USA)
11 October 2023; 13:00	(32–34, 21–23); Report			Plazas de Toros Huamantla; Referees: Giovanni Bake (RSA), Suzanne Lowry (USA)

11 October 2023; 13:00	Gottardi – Menegatti (Italy)	2–0	(Switzerland) Vergé-Dépré – Mäder	Plazas de Toros Apizaco; Referees: Vincent Roche (FRA), Charalampos Papadogoulas (GRE)
11 October 2023; 13:00	(22–20, 21–15); Report			Plazas de Toros Apizaco; Referees: Vincent Roche (FRA), Charalampos Papadogoulas (GRE)

11 October 2023; 13:00	Müller – Tillmann (Germany)	2–0	(Spain) Liliana – Paula	Plaza de la Constitución Tlaxcala; Referees: Milán Vachutka (CZE), Lisandro dos Santos (BRA)
11 October 2023; 13:00	(22–20, 21–16); Report			Plaza de la Constitución Tlaxcala; Referees: Milán Vachutka (CZE), Lisandro dos Santos (BRA)

11 October 2023; 13:00	Ágatha – Rebecca (Brazil)	2–1	(Germany) Ludwig – Lippmann	Plazas de Toros Tlaxcala; Referees: Marlene Hernández (MEX), Sylvain Druart (FRA)
11 October 2023; 13:00	(19–21, 22–20, 15–8); Report			Plazas de Toros Tlaxcala; Referees: Marlene Hernández (MEX), Sylvain Druart (FRA)

11 October 2023; 14:00	Cannon – Kraft (United States)	2–1	(Brazil) Andressa – Vitória	Plazas de Toros Huamantla; Referees: Carlos Rivera (PUR), José María Padron (ESP)
11 October 2023; 14:00	(22–24, 24–22, 15–12); Report			Plazas de Toros Huamantla; Referees: Carlos Rivera (PUR), José María Padron (ESP)

11 October 2023; 14:00	Mariafe – Clancy (Australia)	2–0	(Germany) Ittlinger – Borger	Plazas de Toros Apizaco; Referees: Rui Carvalho (POR), Agnieszka Myszkowska (POL)
11 October 2023; 14:00	(21–19, 25–23); Report			Plazas de Toros Apizaco; Referees: Rui Carvalho (POR), Agnieszka Myszkowska (POL)

11 October 2023; 14:00	Tainá – Victória (Brazil)	2–1	(Brazil) Carol – Bárbara	Plaza de la Constitución Tlaxcala; Referees: Mariko Satomi (JPN), Brian Hiebert (CAN)
11 October 2023; 14:00	(22–20, 17–21, 16–14); Report			Plaza de la Constitución Tlaxcala; Referees: Mariko Satomi (JPN), Brian Hiebert (CAN)

11 October 2023; 14:00	Pavan – McBain (Canada)	0–2	(United States) Nuss – Kloth	Plazas de Toros Tlaxcala; Referees: Osvaldo Sumavil (ARG), Emanuel Batani (MEX)
11 October 2023; 14:00	(21–23, 12–21); Report			Plazas de Toros Tlaxcala; Referees: Osvaldo Sumavil (ARG), Emanuel Batani (MEX)

11 October 2023; 19:00	Ana Patrícia – Duda (Brazil)	2–0	(Lithuania) Paulikienė – Raupelytė	Plazas de Toros Huamantla; Referees: Robert Leko (SRB), Juan Saavedra (COL)
11 October 2023; 19:00	(21–14, 21–15); Report			Plazas de Toros Huamantla; Referees: Robert Leko (SRB), Juan Saavedra (COL)

11 October 2023; 19:00	Esmée – Zoé (Switzerland)	2–0	(France) Placette – Richard	Plazas de Toros Apizaco; Referees: Agnieszka Myszkowska (POL), Rui Carvalho (POR)
11 October 2023; 19:00	(26–24, 21–16); Report			Plazas de Toros Apizaco; Referees: Agnieszka Myszkowska (POL), Rui Carvalho (POR)

11 October 2023; 19:00	Tīna – Anastasija (Latvia)	2–0	(China) Dong – Wang	Plaza de la Constitución Tlaxcala; Referees: Nina Hobi (AUT), Milán Vachutka (CZE)
11 October 2023; 19:00	(21–14, 21–17); Report			Plaza de la Constitución Tlaxcala; Referees: Nina Hobi (AUT), Milán Vachutka (CZE)

11 October 2023; 19:00	Hermannová – Štochlová (Czech Republic)	0–2	(United States) Scoles – Flint	Plazas de Toros Tlaxcala; Referees: Wang Lijun (CHN), Marlene Hernández (MEX)
11 October 2023; 19:00	(21–23, 8–21); Report			Plazas de Toros Tlaxcala; Referees: Wang Lijun (CHN), Marlene Hernández (MEX)

11 October 2023; 20:00	Xue – Xia (China)	2–0	(Thailand) Naraphornrapat – Worapeerachayakorn	Plazas de Toros Huamantla; Referees: Suzanne Lowry (USA), Giovanni Bake (RSA)
11 October 2023; 20:00	(21–12, 21–16); Report			Plazas de Toros Huamantla; Referees: Suzanne Lowry (USA), Giovanni Bake (RSA)

11 October 2023; 20:00	Ahtiainen – Lahti (Finland)	0–2	(Canada) Melissa – Brandie	Plazas de Toros Apizaco; Referees: Brigham Beatie (USA), Davide Crescentini (ITA)
11 October 2023; 20:00	(17–21, 17–21); Report			Plazas de Toros Apizaco; Referees: Brigham Beatie (USA), Davide Crescentini (ITA)

11 October 2023; 20:00	Hughes – Cheng (United States)	2–1	(Austria) D. Klinger – R. Klinger	Plaza de la Constitución Tlaxcala; Referees: Jean Mukundiyukuri (RWA), Emanuel Batani (MEX)
11 October 2023; 20:00	(27–25, 19–21, 15–9); Report			Plaza de la Constitución Tlaxcala; Referees: Jean Mukundiyukuri (RWA), Emanuel Batani (MEX)

11 October 2023; 20:00	Hüberli – Betschart (Switzerland)	2–0	(Poland) Gruszczyńska – Wachowicz	Plazas de Toros Tlaxcala; Referees: Giseli Amantino (BRA), Mariko Satomi (JPN)
11 October 2023; 20:00	(21–16, 21–14); Report			Plazas de Toros Tlaxcala; Referees: Giseli Amantino (BRA), Mariko Satomi (JPN)

=== Round of 16 ===
12 October 2023; 17:00	Cannon – Kraft (United States)	0–2	(Netherlands) Stam – Schoon	Plazas de Toros Huamantla; Referees: Juan Saavedra (COL), Carlos Rivera (PUR)
12 October 2023; 17:00	(18–21, 17–21); Report			Plazas de Toros Huamantla; Referees: Juan Saavedra (COL), Carlos Rivera (PUR)

12 October 2023; 17:00	Müller – Tillmann (Germany)	1–2	(Brazil) Tainá – Victória	Plaza de la Constitución Tlaxcala; Referees: Nina Hobi (AUT), Milán Vachutka (CZE)
12 October 2023; 17:00	(19–21, 24–22, 13–15); Report			Plaza de la Constitución Tlaxcala; Referees: Nina Hobi (AUT), Milán Vachutka (CZE)

12 October 2023; 18:00	Mariafe – Clancy (Australia)	2–1	(Italy) Gottardi – Menegatti	Plazas de Toros Apizaco; Referees: Charalampos Papadogoulas (GRE), Vincent Roche (FRA)
12 October 2023; 18:00	(21–18, 15–21, 15–11); Report			Plazas de Toros Apizaco; Referees: Charalampos Papadogoulas (GRE), Vincent Roche (FRA)

12 October 2023; 18:00	Ágatha – Rebecca (Brazil)	0–2	(United States) Nuss – Kloth	Plazas de Toros Tlaxcala; Referees: Wang Lijun (CHN), Mariko Satomi (JPN)
12 October 2023; 18:00	(22–24, 14–21); Report			Plazas de Toros Tlaxcala; Referees: Wang Lijun (CHN), Mariko Satomi (JPN)

12 October 2023; 20:00	Ana Patrícia – Duda (Brazil)	2–0	(China) Xue – Xia	Plazas de Toros Huamantla; Referees: Suzanne Lowry (USA), Robert Leko (SRB)
12 October 2023; 20:00	(25–23, 21–18); Report			Plazas de Toros Huamantla; Referees: Suzanne Lowry (USA), Robert Leko (SRB)

12 October 2023; 20:00	Esmée – Zoé (Switzerland)	0–2	(Canada) Melissa – Brandie	Plazas de Toros Apizaco; Referees: Davide Crescentini (ITA), Agnieszka Myszkowska (POL)
12 October 2023; 20:00	(14–21, 11–21); Report			Plazas de Toros Apizaco; Referees: Davide Crescentini (ITA), Agnieszka Myszkowska (POL)

12 October 2023; 20:00	Hughes – Cheng (United States)	2–1	(Latvia) Tīna – Anastasija	Plaza de la Constitución Tlaxcala; Referees: Sylvain Druart (FRA), Marlene Hernández (MEX)
12 October 2023; 20:00	(19–21, 21–16, 15–11); Report			Plaza de la Constitución Tlaxcala; Referees: Sylvain Druart (FRA), Marlene Hernández (MEX)

12 October 2023; 20:00	Hüberli – Betschart (Switzerland)	2–0	(United States) Scoles – Flint	Plazas de Toros Tlaxcala; Referees: Mariko Satomi (JPN), Jean Mukundiyukuri (RWA)
12 October 2023; 20:00	(21–17, 27–25); Report			Plazas de Toros Tlaxcala; Referees: Mariko Satomi (JPN), Jean Mukundiyukuri (RWA)

=== Quarterfinals ===
13 October 2023; 17:00	Hughes – Cheng (United States)	2–0	(Brazil) Tainá – Victória	Plaza de la Constitución Tlaxcala; Referees: Osvaldo Sumavil (ARG), Mariko Satomi (JPN)
13 October 2023; 17:00	(21–14, 21–16); Report			Plaza de la Constitución Tlaxcala; Referees: Osvaldo Sumavil (ARG), Mariko Satomi (JPN)

13 October 2023; 18:00	Mariafe – Clancy (Australia)	2–0	(Canada) Melissa – Brandie	Plazas de Toros Apizaco; Referees: Agnieszka Myszkowska (POL), Charalampos Papadogoulas (GRE)
13 October 2023; 18:00	(22–20, 21–16); Report			Plazas de Toros Apizaco; Referees: Agnieszka Myszkowska (POL), Charalampos Papadogoulas (GRE)

13 October 2023; 19:00	Hüberli – Betschart (Switzerland)	1–2	(United States) Nuss – Kloth	Plazas de Toros Tlaxcala; Referees: Sylvain Druart (FRA), Giseli Amantino (BRA)
13 October 2023; 19:00	(17–21, 21–19, 8–15); Report			Plazas de Toros Tlaxcala; Referees: Sylvain Druart (FRA), Giseli Amantino (BRA)

13 October 2023; 21:00	Ana Patrícia – Duda (Brazil)	2–0	(Netherlands) Stam – Schoon	Plazas de Toros Huamantla; Referees: José Maria Padron (ESP), Suzanne Lowry (USA)
13 October 2023; 21:00	(21–16, 21–16); Report			Plazas de Toros Huamantla; Referees: José Maria Padron (ESP), Suzanne Lowry (USA)

=== Semifinals ===
14 October 2023; 18:00	Hughes – Cheng (United States)	2–1	(United States) Nuss – Kloth	Plazas de Toros Tlaxcala; Referees: Vincent Roche (FRA), Giseli Amantino (BRA)
14 October 2023; 18:00	(18–21, 21–12, 15–13); Report			Plazas de Toros Tlaxcala; Referees: Vincent Roche (FRA), Giseli Amantino (BRA)

14 October 2023; 20:00	Ana Patrícia – Duda (Brazil)	2–0	(Australia) Mariafe – Clancy	Plazas de Toros Tlaxcala; Referees: Brigham Beatie (USA), Wang Lijun (CHN)
14 October 2023; 20:00	(21–17, 21–14); Report			Plazas de Toros Tlaxcala; Referees: Brigham Beatie (USA), Wang Lijun (CHN)

=== Third place game ===
15 October 2023; 13:15	Mariafe – Clancy (Australia)	1–2	(United States) Nuss – Kloth	Plazas de Toros Tlaxcala; Referees: Giseli Amantino (BRA), Brian Hiebert (CAN)
15 October 2023; 13:15	(21–15, 19–21, 8–15); Report			Plazas de Toros Tlaxcala; Referees: Giseli Amantino (BRA), Brian Hiebert (CAN)

=== Final ===
15 October 2023; 16:00	Ana Patrícia – Duda (Brazil)	0–2	(United States) Hughes – Cheng	Plazas de Toros Tlaxcala; Referees: Wang Lijun (CHN), Agnieszka Myszkowska (POL)
15 October 2023; 16:00	(16–21, 20–22); Report			Plazas de Toros Tlaxcala; Referees: Wang Lijun (CHN), Agnieszka Myszkowska (POL)

== Final ranking ==
Rank	Team
Gold medal	(United States) Hughes – Cheng
Silver medal	(Brazil) Ana Patrícia – Duda
Bronze medal	(United States) Nuss – Kloth
4	(Australia) Mariafe – Clancy
5	(Brazil) Tainá – Victória
5	(Canada) Melissa – Brandie
5	(Netherlands) Stam – Schoon
5	(Switzerland) Hüberli – Betschart
9	(Brazil) Ágatha – Rebecca
9	(China) Xue – Xia
9	(Germany) Müller – Tillmann
9	(Italy) Gottardi – Menegatti
9	(Latvia) Tīna – Anastasija
9	(Switzerland) Esmée – Zoé
9	(United States) Cannon – Kraft
9	(United States) Scoles – Flint
17	(Austria) D. Klinger – R. Klinger
17	(Brazil) Andressa – Vitória
17	(Brazil) Carol – Bárbara
17	(Canada) Pavan – McBain
17	(China) Dong – Wang
17	(Czech Republic) Hermannová – Štochlová
17	(Spain) Álvarez – Moreno
17	(Spain) Liliana – Paula
17	(Finland) Ahtiainen – Lahti
17	(France) Placette – Richard
17	(Germany) Ittlinger – Borger
17	(Germany) Ludwig – Lippmann
17	(Lithuania) Paulikienė – Raupelytė
17	(Poland) Gruszczyńska – Wachowicz
17	(Switzerland) Vergé-Dépré – Mäder
17	(Thailand) Naraphornrapat – Worapeerachayakorn
33	(Ecuador) Ariana – Karelys
33	(Japan) Ishii – Mizoe
33	(Mexico) Gutiérrez – Flores
33	(Paraguay) Erika – Michelle
37	(Argentina) Gallay – Pereyra
37	(Chile) Rivas – Chris
37	(Costa Rica) Quesada – Williams
37	(Dominican Republic) Almánzar – Payano
37	(Italy) Bianchin – Scampoli
37	(Japan) Akiko – Yurika
37	(Morocco) Yakki – Mahassine
37	(Mexico) Albarran – Vidaurrazaga
37	(Mexico) Torres – Rivera
37	(Mozambique) Vanessa – Sinaportar
37	(Puerto Rico) Navas – González
37	(United States) Alix – Harward

== See also ==
- 2023 Beach Volleyball World Championships – Men's tournament
