= Claes (surname) =

Claes is a surname, and may refer to:

- Allessia Claes (born 1981), Belgian politician
- Bart Claes (born 1989), Belgian politician
- Dirk Claes (born 1959), Belgian politician
- Ernest Claes (1885–1968), Belgian author
- Gabrielle Claes, Belgian museum curator
- Georges Claes (1920–1994), Belgian racing cyclist
- Glenn Claes (born 1994), Belgian footballer
- Hanne Claes (born 1991), Belgian athlete
- Ian Claes (born 1981), Belgian footballer
- Jappe Claes (born 1952), Belgian actor
- Jean Claes (footballer, born 1902) (1902–1979), Belgian footballer
- Jean Claes (footballer, born 1934) (1934–2004), Belgian footballer
- Jean-Baptiste Claes (born 1937), Belgian racing cyclist
- Jeanine Claes (1947–2019), French artist, dancer and choreographer
- Johnny Claes (1916–1956), Belgian racing driver
- Kelly Claes (born 1995), American volleyball player
- Lode Claes (1913–1997), Belgian economist, journalist and politician
- Lotte Claes (born 1993), Belgian racing cyclist and duathlete
- Lucien Claes (1923–1994), Belgian wrestler
- Paul Claes (born 1943), Belgian writer, poet and translator
- Pierre Claes (1901–1989), Belgian racing cyclist
- Ronny Claes (born 1957), Belgian racing cyclist
- Ulrich Klaes, German field hockey player
- Victor Claes (born 1894), Belgian equestrian
- Virginie Claes (born 1982), Belgian TV host, Miss Belgium 2006
- Willy Claes (born 1938), Belgian politician, Secretary General of NATO 1994–1995
- Willy Claes (weightlifter) (1937–2017), Belgian weightlifter
- Wim Claes (1961–2018), Belgian composer, arranger and music producer
- Wouter Claes (born 1975), Belgian badminton player

== See also ==
- Clais
