= 2024 European Beach Volleyball Championships =

European Beach Volleyball Championship

Tournament details
- Host country: The Hague, Arnhem, and Apeldoorn, Netherlands
- Dates: 13–18 August 2024
- Teams: 64 (32 men & 32 women)
- Venue: (in 3 host cities)

The 2024 European Beach Volleyball Championships was the 2024 edition of European Beach Volleyball Championship which is a unisex competition of national teams that took place from 13 to 18 August 2024 in The Hague, Arnhem, and Apeldoorn in the Netherlands. The draw consisted of 32 men's & 32 women's teams.

== Medal events ==
=== Medal table ===
* Host nation (Netherlands)

Rank	Nation	Gold	Silver	Bronze	Total
1	Germany	1	1	0	2
2	Latvia	1	0	0	1
3	Italy	0	1	0	1
4	Netherlands*	0	0	1	1
4	Switzerland	0	0	1	1
Totals (5 entries)		2	2	2	6

=== Medal summary ===
Event	Gold	Silver	Bronze
Men	Latvia; Mārtiņš Pļaviņš; Kristians Fokerots	Germany; Clemens Wickler; Nils Ehlers	Netherlands; Steven van de Velde; Matthew Immers
Women	Germany; Svenja Müller; Cinja Tillmann	Italy; Valentina Gottardi; Marta Menegatti	Switzerland; Esmée Böbner; Zoé Vergé-Dépré

== Men's tournament ==
=== Preliminary round ===
==== Pool A ====
Pos	Team	Pld	W	L	Pts	SW	SL	SR	SPW	SPL	SPR	Qualification
1	Luini–Varenhorst (NED)	3	3	0	6	6	1	6.000	139	101	1.376	Round of 16
2	Ayé–Bassereau (FRA)	3	2	1	5	4	3	1.333	126	126	1.000	Round of 24
3	Popov–Reznik (UKR)	3	1	2	4	3	4	0.750	128	136	0.941	Round of 24
4	Seiser–Grössig (AUT)	3	0	3	3	1	6	0.167	112	142	0.789	

Updated to match(es) played on 15 August 2024. Source: cev.eu

Date	Time		Score		Set 1	Set 2	Set 3	Total	Report
14 Aug	17:00	Ayé–Bassereau (France)	2–0	(Austria) Seiser–Grössig	21–11	21–19		42–30	Report
14 Aug	20:00	Popov–Reznik (Ukraine)	0–2	(Netherlands) Luini–Varenhorst	18–21	11–21		29–42	Report
15 Aug	13:00	Ayé–Bassereau (France)	0–2	(Netherlands) Luini–Varenhorst	16–21	11–21		27–42	Report
15 Aug	14:00	Popov–Reznik (Ukraine)	2–0	(Austria) Seiser–Grössig	24–22	21–15		45–37	Report
15 Aug	20:10	Luini–Varenhorst (Netherlands)	2–1	(Austria) Seiser–Grössig	19–21	21–16	15–8	55–45	Report
15 Aug	21:15	Ayé–Bassereau (France)	2–1	(Ukraine) Popov–Reznik	18–21	24–22	15–11	57–54	Report

==== Pool B ====
Pos	Team	Pld	W	L	Pts	SW	SL	SR	SPW	SPL	SPR	Qualification
1	Herrera–Gavira (ESP)	3	3	0	6	6	2	3.000	163	146	1.116	Round of 16
2	Ja. Bello–Jo. Bello (ENG)	3	2	1	5	5	2	2.500	146	117	1.248	Round of 24
3	Marchetto–Windisch (ITA)	3	1	2	4	3	4	0.750	120	131	0.916	Round of 24
4	Schnetzer–Kindl (AUT)	3	0	3	3	0	6	0.000	91	126	0.722	

Updated to match(es) played on 15 August 2024. Source: cev.eu

Date	Time		Score		Set 1	Set 2	Set 3	Total	Report
14 Aug	12:30	Marchetto–Windisch (Italy)	2–0	(Austria) Schnetzer–Kindl	21–17	21–15		42–32	Report
14 Aug	13:00	Herrera–Gavira (Spain)	2–1	(England) Ja. Bello–Jo. Bello	21–23	26–24	17–15	64–62	Report
15 Aug	11:00	Marchetto–Windisch (Italy)	0–2	(England) Ja. Bello–Jo. Bello	10–21	12–21		22–42	Report
15 Aug	12:00	Herrera–Gavira (Spain)	2–0	(Austria) Schnetzer–Kindl	21–10	21–18		42–28	Report
15 Aug	17:00	Ja. Bello–Jo. Bello (England)	2–0	(Austria) Schnetzer–Kindl	21–15	21–16		42–31	Report
15 Aug	19:00	Marchetto–Windisch (Italy)	1–2	(Spain) Herrera–Gavira	21–18	20–22	15–17	56–57	Report

==== Pool C ====
Pos	Team	Pld	W	L	Pts	SW	SL	SR	SPW	SPL	SPR	Qualification
1	Ehlers–Wickler (GER)	3	3	0	6	6	0	MAX	126	93	1.355	Round of 16
2	Penninga–Heemskerk (NED)	3	1	2	4	3	5	0.600	141	143	0.986	Round of 24
3	H. Mol–Berntsen (NOR)	3	1	2	4	3	5	0.600	135	144	0.938	Round of 24
4	Semerad–Dumek (CZE)	3	1	2	4	3	5	0.600	131	153	0.856	

Updated to match(es) played on 15 August 2024. Source: cev.eu

Date	Time		Score		Set 1	Set 2	Set 3	Total	Report
14 Aug	13:00	H. Mol–Berntsen (Norway)	2–1	(Czech Republic) Semerad–Dumek	24–22	19–21	15–7	58–50	Report
14 Aug	18:00	Ehlers–Wickler (Germany)	2–0	(Netherlands) Penninga–Heemskerk	21–18	21–18		42–36	Report
15 Aug	12:00	H. Mol–Berntsen (Norway)	1–2	(Netherlands) Penninga–Heemskerk	19–21	21–16	9–15	49–52	Report
15 Aug	13:00	Ehlers–Wickler (Germany)	2–0	(Czech Republic) Semerad–Dumek	21–19	21–10		42–29	Report
15 Aug	19:00	Ehlers–Wickler (Germany)	2–0	(Norway) H. Mol–Berntsen	21–15	21–13		42–28	Report
15 Aug	20:00	Semerad–Dumek (Czech Republic)	2–1	(Netherlands) Penninga–Heemskerk	16–21	21–19	15–13	52–53	Report

==== Pool D ====
Pos	Team	Pld	W	L	Pts	SW	SL	SR	SPW	SPL	SPR	Qualification
1	van de Velde–Immers (NED)	3	3	0	6	6	0	MAX	126	98	1.286	Round of 16
2	Kantor–Zdybek (POL)	3	2	1	5	4	3	1.333	129	122	1.057	Round of 24
3	Dal Corso–Viscovich (ITA)	3	1	2	4	3	5	0.600	136	144	0.944	Round of 24
4	Henning–Just (GER)	3	0	3	3	1	6	0.167	112	139	0.806	

Updated to match(es) played on 15 August 2024. Source: cev.eu

Date	Time		Score		Set 1	Set 2	Set 3	Total	Report
14 Aug	14:10	Dal Corso–Viscovich (Italy)	1–2	(Poland) Kantor–Zdybek	14–21	21–18	13–15	48–54	Report
14 Aug	18:00	van de Velde–Immers (Netherlands)	2–0	(Germany) Henning–Just	21–15	21–17		42–32	Report
15 Aug	13:00	van de Velde–Immers (Netherlands)	2–0	(Poland) Kantor–Zdybek	21–16	21–17		42–33	Report
15 Aug	14:00	Dal Corso–Viscovich (Italy)	2–1	(Germany) Henning–Just	21–17	19–21	15–10	55–48	Report
15 Aug	19:00	Kantor–Zdybek (Poland)	2–0	(Germany) Henning–Just	21–17	21–15		42–32	Report
15 Aug	21:00	van de Velde–Immers (Netherlands)	2–0	(Italy) Dal Corso–Viscovich	21–14	21–19		42–33	Report

==== Pool E ====
Pos	Team	Pld	W	L	Pts	SW	SL	SR	SPW	SPL	SPR	Qualification
1	Stankevicius–Knasas (LTU)	3	3	0	6	6	2	3.000	152	139	1.094	Round of 16
2	Boermans–de Groot (NED)	3	2	1	5	5	2	2.500	135	124	1.089	Round of 24
3	Janiak–Brozyniak (POL)	3	1	2	4	2	4	0.500	106	121	0.876	Round of 24
4	Pedrosa–Campos (POR)	3	0	3	3	1	6	0.167	123	142	0.866	

Updated to match(es) played on 15 August 2024. Source: cev.eu

Date	Time		Score		Set 1	Set 2	Set 3	Total	Report
14 Aug	14:00	Pedrosa–Campos (Portugal)	1–2	(Lithuania) Stankevicius–Knasas	21–19	19–21	15–17	55–57	Report
14 Aug	20:10	Boermans–de Groot (Netherlands)	2–0	(Poland) Janiak–Brozyniak	21–17	21–13		42–30	Report
15 Aug	14:00	Boermans–de Groot (Netherlands)	1–2	(Lithuania) Stankevicius–Knasas	17–21	21–17	13–15	51–53	Report
15 Aug	15:00	Janiak–Brozyniak (Poland)	2–0	(Portugal) Pedrosa–Campos	22–20	21–17		43–37	Report
15 Aug	21:00	Boermans–de Groot (Netherlands)	2–0	(Portugal) Pedrosa–Campos	21–16	21–15		42–31	Report
15 Aug	22:00	Janiak–Brozyniak (Poland)	0–2	(Lithuania) Stankevicius–Knasas	18–21	15–21		33–42	Report

==== Pool F ====
Pos	Team	Pld	W	L	Pts	SW	SL	SR	SPW	SPL	SPR	Qualification
1	Sepka–Sedlak (CZE)	3	3	0	6	6	1	6.000	145	92	1.576	Round of 16
2	Brouwer–Meeuwsen (NED)	3	2	1	5	5	3	1.667	153	111	1.378	Round of 24
3	Métral–Haussener (SUI)	3	1	2	4	3	4	0.750	128	126	1.016	Round of 24
4	Łosiak–Bryl (POL)	3	0	3	3	0	6	0.000	29	126	0.230	

Updated to match(es) played on 15 August 2024. Source: cev.eu

Date	Time		Score		Set 1	Set 2	Set 3	Total	Report
14 Aug	15:00	Łosiak–Bryl (Poland)	0–2	(Switzerland) Métral–Haussener	14–21	15–21		29–42	Report
14 Aug	19:00	Brouwer–Meeuwsen (Netherlands)	1–2	(Czech Republic) Sepka–Sedlak	26–24	16–21	14–16	56–61	Report
15 Aug	12:00	Brouwer–Meeuwsen (Netherlands)	2–1	(Switzerland) Métral–Haussener	16–21	24–22	15–7	55–50	Report
15 Aug	13:00	Łosiak–Bryl (Poland)	0–2	(Czech Republic) Sepka–Sedlak	0–21	0–21		0–42	Report
15 Aug	18:00	Sepka–Sedlak (Czech Republic)	2–0	(Switzerland) Métral–Haussener	21–19	21–17		42–36	Report
15 Aug	20:00	Łosiak–Bryl (Poland)	0–2	(Netherlands) Brouwer–Meeuwsen	0–21	0–21		0–42	Report

==== Pool G ====
Pos	Team	Pld	W	L	Pts	SW	SL	SR	SPW	SPL	SPR	Qualification
1	Cottafava–Nicolai (ITA)	3	3	0	6	6	2	3.000	155	110	1.409	Round of 16
2	Hörl–Horst (AUT)	3	2	1	5	5	3	1.667	136	143	0.951	Round of 24
3	Rotar–Gauthier-Rat (FRA)	3	1	2	4	4	4	1.000	129	144	0.896	Round of 24
4	Sengers–Boehlé (NED)	3	0	3	3	0	6	0.000	104	127	0.819	

Updated to match(es) played on 15 August 2024. Source: cev.eu

Date	Time		Score		Set 1	Set 2	Set 3	Total	Report
14 Aug	13:20	Rotar–Gauthier-Rat (France)	1–2	(Austria) Hörl–Horst	21–13	19–21	13–15	53–49	Report
14 Aug	14:00	Cottafava–Nicolai (Italy)	2–0	(Netherlands) Sengers–Boehlé	21–14	21–18		42–32	Report
15 Aug	10:00	Rotar–Gauthier-Rat (France)	2–0	(Netherlands) Sengers–Boehlé	22–20	21–18		43–38	Report
15 Aug	11:00	Cottafava–Nicolai (Italy)	2–1	(Austria) Hörl–Horst	21–11	20–22	15–12	56–45	Report
15 Aug	17:00	Cottafava–Nicolai (Italy)	2–1	(France) Rotar–Gauthier-Rat	21–23	21–10	21–0	63–43	Report
15 Aug	18:00	Hörl–Horst (Austria)	2–0	(Netherlands) Sengers–Boehlé	21–15	21–19		42–34	Report

==== Pool H ====
Pos	Team	Pld	W	L	Pts	SW	SL	SR	SPW	SPL	SPR	Qualification
1	Pļaviņš–Fokerots (LAT)	3	3	0	6	6	2	3.000	152	118	1.288	Round of 16
2	Hammarberg–Waller (AUT)	3	2	1	5	5	2	2.500	135	82	1.646	Round of 24
3	Krattiger–Breer (SUI)	3	1	2	4	3	4	0.750	121	97	1.247	Round of 24
4	Pfretzschner–Winter (GER)	3	0	3	3	0	6	0.000	15	126	0.119	

Updated to match(es) played on 15 August 2024. Source: cev.eu

Date	Time		Score		Set 1	Set 2	Set 3	Total	Report
14 Aug	14:00	Pfretzschner–Winter (Germany)	0–2 awarded	(Latvia) Pļaviņš–Fokerots	15–21	0–21		15–42	Report
14 Aug	15:00	Hammarberg–Waller (Austria)	2–0	(Switzerland) Krattiger–Breer	21–16	21–11		42–27	Report
15 Aug	11:00	Pfretzschner–Winter (Germany)	0–2 awarded	(Switzerland) Krattiger–Breer	0–21	0–21		0–42	Report
15 Aug	12:00	Hammarberg–Waller (Austria)	1–2	(Latvia) Pļaviņš–Fokerots	21–15	13–21	17–19	51–55	Report
15 Aug	18:00	Pfretzschner–Winter (Germany)	0–2 awarded	(Austria) Hammarberg–Waller	0–21	0–21		0–42	Report
15 Aug	19:00	Krattiger–Breer (Switzerland)	1–2	(Latvia) Pļaviņš–Fokerots	21–19	19–21	12–15	42–45	Report

=== Knockout stage ===
==== Bracket ====
Round of 24
16 August
(Poland) Kantor–Zdybek	1
(Switzerland) Métral–Haussener	2
16 August
(Netherlands) Brouwer–Meeuwsen	2
(Italy) Dal Corso–Viscovich	1
16 August
(Austria) Hammarberg–Waller	2
(Ukraine) Popov–Reznik	0
16 August
(France) Ayé–Bassereau	1
(Switzerland) Krattiger–Breer	2
16 August
(Netherlands) Boermans–de Groot	2
(Netherlands) Penninga–Heemskerk	0
16 August
(Norway) H. Mol–Berntsen	2
(Poland) Janiak–Brozyniak	1
16 August
(England) Ja. Bello–Jo. Bello	2
(France) Rotar–Gauthier-Rat	0
16 August
(Austria) Hörl–Horst	2
(Italy) Marchetto–Windisch	0

Round of 16
16 August
(Czech Republic) Sepka–Sedlak	2
(Switzerland) Métral–Haussener	0
16 August
(Netherlands) van de Velde–Immers	2
(Netherlands) Brouwer–Meeuwsen	1
16 August
(Netherlands) Luini–Varenhorst	2
(Austria) Hammarberg–Waller	0
16 August
(Latvia) Pļaviņš–Fokerots	2
(Switzerland) Krattiger–Breer	0
16 August
(Germany) Ehlers–Wickler	2
(Netherlands) Boermans–de Groot	0
16 August
(Lithuania) Stankevicius–Knasas	0
(Norway) H. Mol–Berntsen	2
16 August
(Italy) Cottafava–Nicolai	2
(England) Ja. Bello–Jo. Bello	0
16 August
(Spain) Herrera–Gavira	2
(Austria) Hörl–Horst	0

Quarter-finals
17 August
(Czech Republic) Sepka–Sedlak	0
(Netherlands) van de Velde–Immers	2
17 August
(Netherlands) Luini–Varenhorst	0
(Latvia) Pļaviņš–Fokerots	2
17 August
(Germany) Ehlers–Wickler	2
(Norway) H. Mol–Berntsen	0
17 August
(Italy) Cottafava–Nicolai	2
(Spain) Herrera–Gavira	1

Semi-finals
18 August
(Netherlands) van de Velde–Immers	0
(Latvia) Pļaviņš–Fokerots	2
18 August
(Germany) Ehlers–Wickler	2
(Italy) Cottafava–Nicolai	1

Final
18 August
(Latvia) Pļaviņš–Fokerots	2
(Germany) Ehlers–Wickler	1
3rd Place
18 August
(Netherlands) van de Velde–Immers	2
(Italy) Cottafava–Nicolai	1

==== Round of 24 ====
Date	Time		Score		Set 1	Set 2	Set 3	Total	Report
16 Aug	13:00	Ja. Bello–Jo. Bello (England)	2–0	(France) Rotar–Gauthier-Rat	21–0	21–0		42–0	Report
16 Aug	13:00	Hörl–Horst (Austria)	2–0	(Italy) Marchetto–Windisch	21–11	21–15		42–26	Report
16 Aug	14:00	Kantor–Zdybek (Poland)	1–2	(Switzerland) Métral–Haussener	16–21	21–19	14–16	51–56	Report
16 Aug	14:00	Brouwer–Meeuwsen (Netherlands)	2–1	(Italy) Dal Corso–Viscovich	21–17	19–21	18–16	58–54	Report
16 Aug	14:30	Hammarberg–Waller (Austria)	2–0	(Ukraine) Popov–Reznik	21–8	21–10		42–18	Report
16 Aug	14:30	H. Mol–Berntsen (Norway)	2–1	(Poland) Janiak–Brozyniak	21–18	17–21	15–12	53–51	Report
16 Aug	15:30	Ayé–Bassereau (France)	1–2	(Switzerland) Krattiger–Breer	21–18	17–21	11–15	49–54	Report
16 Aug	15:30	Boermans–de Groot (Netherlands)	2–0	(Netherlands) Penninga–Heemskerk	21–14	21–15		42–29	Report

==== Round of 16 ====
Date	Time		Score		Set 1	Set 2	Set 3	Total	Report
16 Aug	18:00	Cottafava–Nicolai (Italy)	2–0	(England) Ja. Bello–Jo. Bello	21–19	21–18		42–37	Report
16 Aug	18:00	Herrera–Gavira (Spain)	2–0	(Austria) Hörl–Horst	21–12	21–16		42–28	Report
16 Aug	19:00	Sepka–Sedlak (Czech Republic)	2–0	(Switzerland) Métral–Haussener	21–17	21–13		42–30	Report
16 Aug	19:00	van de Velde–Immers (Netherlands)	2–1	(Netherlands) Brouwer–Meeuwsen	18–21	21–14	15–11	54–46	Report
16 Aug	19:30	Stankevicius–Knasas (Lithuania)	0–2	(Norway) H. Mol–Berntsen	14–21	23–25		37–46	Report
16 Aug	20:30	Ehlers–Wickler (Germany)	2–0	(Netherlands) Boermans–de Groot	21–16	21–15		42–31	Report
16 Aug	20:35	Luini–Varenhorst (Netherlands)	2–0	(Austria) Hammarberg–Waller	21–16	22–20		43–36	Report
16 Aug	21:35	Pļaviņš–Fokerots (Latvia)	2–0	(Switzerland) Krattiger–Breer	21–18	21–18		42–36	Report

==== Quarterfinals ====
Date	Time		Score		Set 1	Set 2	Set 3	Total	Report
17 Aug	15:30	Cottafava–Nicolai (Italy)	2–1	(Spain) Herrera–Gavira	21–23	21–17	15–13	57–53	Report
17 Aug	16:30	Sepka–Sedlak (Czech Republic)	0–2	(Netherlands) van de Velde–Immers	15–21	12–21		27–42	Report
17 Aug	14:00	Luini–Varenhorst (Netherlands)	0–2	(Latvia) Pļaviņš–Fokerots	15–21	10–21		25–42	Report
17 Aug	15:00	Ehlers–Wickler (Germany)	2–0	(Norway) H. Mol–Berntsen	21–18	21–18		42–36	Report

==== Semifinals ====
Date	Time		Score		Set 1	Set 2	Set 3	Total	Report
18 Aug	09:45	Ehlers–Wickler (Germany)	2–1	(Italy) Cottafava–Nicolai	18–21	21–17	16–14	55–52	Report
18 Aug	10:45	Pļaviņš–Fokerots (Latvia)	2–0	(Netherlands) van de Velde–Immers	21–19	21–19		42–38	Report

==== Third place game ====
Date	Time		Score		Set 1	Set 2	Set 3	Total	Report
18 Aug	13:45	van de Velde–Immers (Netherlands)	2–1	(Italy) Cottafava–Nicolai	21–17	17–21	16–14	54–52	Report

==== Final ====
Date	Time		Score		Set 1	Set 2	Set 3	Total	Report
18 Aug	15:00	Pļaviņš–Fokerots (Latvia)	2–1	(Germany) Ehlers–Wickler	17–21	22–20	15-5	54-46	Report

== Women's tournament ==
=== Preliminary round ===
==== Pool A ====
Pos	Team	Pld	W	L	Pts	SW	SL	SR	SPW	SPL	SPR	Qualification
1	Hermannová–Štochlová (CZE)	3	3	0	6	6	0	MAX	127	106	1.198	Round of 16
2	Dumbauskaitė–Vasiliauskaitė (LTU)	3	2	1	5	4	2	2.000	123	96	1.281	Round of 24
3	Konink–Poiesz (NED)	3	1	2	4	2	4	0.500	105	112	0.938	Round of 24
4	Friedl–Trailović (AUT)	3	0	3	3	0	6	0.000	85	106	0.802	

Updated to match(es) played on 14 August 2024. Source: cev.eu

Date	Time		Score		Set 1	Set 2	Set 3	Total	Report
13 Aug	18:00	Dumbauskaitė–Vasiliauskaitė (Lithuania)	0–2	(Czech Republic) Hermannová–Štochlová	20–22	19–21		39–43	Report
13 Aug	21:00	Friedl–Trailović (Austria)	0–2	(Netherlands) Konink–Poiesz	12–21	16–21		28–42	Report
14 Aug	11:30	Friedl–Trailović (Austria)	0–2	(Czech Republic) Hermannová–Štochlová	15–21	17–21		32–42	Report
14 Aug	12:00	Dumbauskaitė–Vasiliauskaitė (Lithuania)	2–0	(Netherlands) Konink–Poiesz	21–15	21–13		42–28	Report
14 Aug	19:00	Friedl–Trailović (Austria)	0–2	(Lithuania) Dumbauskaitė–Vasiliauskaitė	12–21	13–21		25–42	Report
14 Aug	21:00	Hermannová–Štochlová (Czech Republic)	2–0	(Netherlands) Konink–Poiesz	21–19	21–16		42–35	Report

==== Pool B ====
Pos	Team	Pld	W	L	Pts	SW	SL	SR	SPW	SPL	SPR	Qualification
1	Hladun–Lazarenko (UKR)	3	3	0	6	6	2	3.000	150	130	1.154	Round of 16
2	Schneider–Kozuch (GER)	3	2	1	5	5	2	2.500	129	116	1.112	Round of 24
3	Stam–Schoon (NED)	3	1	2	4	3	4	0.750	123	120	1.025	Round of 24
4	Bianchin–Scampoli (ITA)	3	0	3	3	0	6	0.000	96	132	0.727	

Updated to match(es) played on 14 August 2024. Source: cev.eu

Date	Time		Score		Set 1	Set 2	Set 3	Total	Report
13 Aug	18:00	Schneider–Kozuch (Germany)	2–0	(Italy) Bianchin–Scampoli	21–16	21–12		42–28	Report
13 Aug	20:10	Stam–Schoon (Netherlands)	1–2	(Ukraine) Hladun–Lazarenko	21–14	13–21	11–15	45–50	Report
14 Aug	09:00	Schneider–Kozuch (Germany)	1–2	(Ukraine) Hladun–Lazarenko	21–16	12–21	11–15	44–52	Report
14 Aug	12:00	Stam–Schoon (Netherlands)	2–0	(Italy) Bianchin–Scampoli	21–9	21–18		42–27	Report
14 Aug	17:00	Bianchin–Scampoli (Italy)	0–2	(Ukraine) Hladun–Lazarenko	16–21	25–27		41–48	Report
14 Aug	21:00	Stam–Schoon (Netherlands)	0–2	(Germany) Schneider–Kozuch	16–21	20–22		36–43	Report

==== Pool C ====
Pos	Team	Pld	W	L	Pts	SW	SL	SR	SPW	SPL	SPR	Qualification
1	Graudiņa–Samoilova (LAT)	3	3	0	6	6	1	6.000	143	122	1.172	Round of 16
2	Śliwka–Wachowicz (POL)	3	2	1	5	4	4	1.000	133	142	0.937	Round of 24
3	Piersma–Bekhuis (NED)	3	1	2	4	3	5	0.600	150	157	0.955	Round of 24
4	Placette–Richard (FRA)	3	0	3	3	3	6	0.500	156	161	0.969	

Updated to match(es) played on 14 August 2024. Source: cev.eu

Date	Time		Score		Set 1	Set 2	Set 3	Total	Report
13 Aug	20:00	Graudiņa–Samoilova (Latvia)	2–1	(France) Placette–Richard	21–18	19–21	15–13	55–52	Report
13 Aug	21:00	Śliwka–Wachowicz (Poland)	2–1	(Netherlands) Piersma–Bekhuis	20–22	21–17	15–12	56–51	Report
14 Aug	11:00	Śliwka–Wachowicz (Poland)	2–1	(France) Placette–Richard	12–21	21–15	15–13	48–49	Report
14 Aug	12:00	Graudiņa–Samoilova (Latvia)	2–0	(Netherlands) Piersma–Bekhuis	25–23	21–18		46–41	Report
14 Aug	19:00	Graudiņa–Samoilova (Latvia)	2–0	(Poland) Śliwka–Wachowicz	21–18	21–11		42–29	Report
14 Aug	22:00	Piersma–Bekhuis (Netherlands)	2–1	(France) Placette–Richard	22–24	21–19	15–12	58–55	Report

==== Pool D ====
Pos	Team	Pld	W	L	Pts	SW	SL	SR	SPW	SPL	SPR	Qualification
1	Gottardi–Menegatti (ITA)	3	2	1	5	5	3	1.667	146	126	1.159	Round of 16
2	Orsi Toth–Bianchi (ITA)	3	2	1	5	4	3	1.333	130	127	1.024	Round of 24
3	Ahtiainen–Lahti-Liukkonen (FIN)	3	1	2	4	3	4	0.750	127	130	0.977	Round of 24
4	Vieira–Chamereau (FRA)	3	1	2	4	3	5	0.600	129	149	0.866	

Updated to match(es) played on 14 August 2024. Source: cev.eu

Date	Time		Score		Set 1	Set 2	Set 3	Total	Report
13 Aug	17:00	Gottardi–Menegatti (Italy)	1–2	(Italy) Orsi Toth–Bianchi	21–16	19–21	10–15	50–52	Report
13 Aug	17:00	Vieira–Chamereau (France)	2–1	(Finland) Ahtiainen–Lahti-Liukkonen	15–21	22–20	15–12	52–53	Report
14 Aug	09:00	Gottardi–Menegatti (Italy)	2–0	(Finland) Ahtiainen–Lahti-Liukkonen	21–15	21–17		42–32	Report
14 Aug	09:00	Vieira–Chamereau (France)	0–2	(Italy) Orsi Toth–Bianchi	17–21	18–21		35–42	Report
14 Aug	16:00	Gottardi–Menegatti (Italy)	2–1	(France) Vieira–Chamereau	18–21	21–9	15–12	54–42	Report
14 Aug	16:00	Orsi Toth–Bianchi (Italy)	0–2	(Finland) Ahtiainen–Lahti-Liukkonen	19–21	17–21		36–42	Report

==== Pool E ====
Pos	Team	Pld	W	L	Pts	SW	SL	SR	SPW	SPL	SPR	Qualification
1	Müller–Tillmann (GER)	3	3	0	6	6	0	MAX	126	86	1.465	Round of 16
2	Ludwig–Lippmann (GER)	3	2	1	5	4	2	2.000	117	95	1.232	Round of 24
3	Dunarova–Daniela (CZE)	3	1	2	4	2	4	0.500	100	116	0.862	Round of 24
4	Kotnik–Lovšin (SLO)	3	0	3	3	0	6	0.000	80	126	0.635	

Updated to match(es) played on 14 August 2024. Source: cev.eu

Date	Time		Score		Set 1	Set 2	Set 3	Total	Report
13 Aug	18:00	Dunarova–Daniela (Czech Republic)	2–0	(Slovenia) Kotnik–Lovšin	21–19	21–13		42–32	Report
13 Aug	19:00	Müller–Tillmann (Germany)	2–0	(Germany) Ludwig–Lippmann	21–14	21–19		42–33	Report
14 Aug	10:00	Müller–Tillmann (Germany)	2–0	(Slovenia) Kotnik–Lovšin	21–9	21–18		42–27	Report
14 Aug	13:00	Ludwig–Lippmann (Germany)	2–0	(Czech Republic) Dunarova–Daniela	21–18	21–14		42–32	Report
14 Aug	18:00	Müller–Tillmann (Germany)	2–0	(Czech Republic) Dunarova–Daniela	21–11	21–15		42–26	Report
14 Aug	19:00	Ludwig–Lippmann (Germany)	2–0	(Slovenia) Kotnik–Lovšin	21–9	21–12		42–21	Report

==== Pool F ====
Pos	Team	Pld	W	L	Pts	SW	SL	SR	SPW	SPL	SPR	Qualification
1	Vergé-Dépré–Mäder (SUI)	3	3	0	6	6	1	6.000	148	131	1.130	Round of 16
2	Álvarez–Moreno (ESP)	3	2	1	5	4	3	1.333	132	88	1.500	Round of 24
3	Schieder–Borger (GER)	3	1	2	4	3	4	0.750	90	128	0.703	Round of 24
4	Carro–González (ESP)	3	0	3	3	1	3	0.333	126	149	0.846	

Updated to match(es) played on 14 August 2024. Source: cev.eu

Date	Time		Score		Set 1	Set 2	Set 3	Total	Report
13 Aug	19:00	Álvarez–Moreno (Spain)	2–1	(Spain) Carro–González	18–21	21–14	15–11	54–46	Report
13 Aug	20:00	Vergé-Dépré–Mäder (Switzerland)	2–1	(Germany) Schieder–Borger	21–15	18–21	15–11	54–47	Report
14 Aug	10:40	Vergé-Dépré–Mäder (Switzerland)	2–1	(Spain) Carro–González	21–17	16–21	15–10	52–48	Report
14 Aug	11:00	Álvarez–Moreno (Spain)	2–0 awarded	(Germany) Schieder–Borger	21–0	21–0		42–0	Report
14 Aug	18:00	Schieder–Borger (Germany)	2–0	(Spain) Carro–González	22–20	21–12		43–32	Report
14 Aug	20:00	Álvarez–Moreno (Spain)	0–2	(Switzerland) Vergé-Dépré–Mäder	17–21	19–21		36–42	Report

==== Pool G ====
Pos	Team	Pld	W	L	Pts	SW	SL	SR	SPW	SPL	SPR	Qualification
1	Böbner–Vergé-Dépré (SUI)	3	3	0	6	6	1	6.000	135	102	1.324	Round of 16
2	Plesiutschnig–Schützenhöfer (AUT)	3	1	2	4	3	4	0.750	118	122	0.967	Round of 24
3	Cools–Van den Vonder (BEL)	3	1	2	4	2	4	0.500	104	113	0.920	Round of 24
4	Davidova–Khmil (UKR)	3	1	2	4	2	4	0.500	95	113	0.841	

Updated to match(es) played on 14 August 2024. Source: cev.eu

Date	Time		Score		Set 1	Set 2	Set 3	Total	Report
13 Aug	19:00	Cools–Van den Vonder (Belgium)	2–0	(Austria) Plesiutschnig–Schützenhöfer	21–13	21–16		42–29	Report
13 Aug	21:15	Böbner–Vergé-Dépré (Switzerland)	2–0	(Ukraine) Davidova–Khmil	21–8	21–16		42–24	Report
14 Aug	10:00	Cools–Van den Vonder (Belgium)	0–2	(Ukraine) Davidova–Khmil	15–21	14–21		29–42	Report
14 Aug	11:00	Böbner–Vergé-Dépré (Switzerland)	2–1	(Austria) Plesiutschnig–Schützenhöfer	15–21	21–18	15–8	51–47	Report
14 Aug	16:00	Plesiutschnig–Schützenhöfer (Austria)	2–0	(Ukraine) Davidova–Khmil	21–13	21–16		42–29	Report
14 Aug	21:15	Böbner–Vergé-Dépré (Switzerland)	2–0	(Belgium) Cools–Van den Vonder	21–13	21–18		42–31	Report

==== Pool H ====
Pos	Team	Pld	W	L	Pts	SW	SL	SR	SPW	SPL	SPR	Qualification
1	Paulikienė–Raupelytė (LTU)	3	3	0	6	6	2	3.000	153	151	1.013	Round of 16
2	Bröring–van Driel (NED)	3	2	1	5	5	2	2.500	138	125	1.104	Round of 24
3	Klinger–Klinger (AUT)	3	1	2	4	2	5	0.400	154	153	1.007	Round of 24
4	Helland-Hansen–Olimstad (NOR)	3	0	3	3	2	6	0.333	134	150	0.893	

Updated to match(es) played on 14 August 2024. Source: cev.eu

Date	Time		Score		Set 1	Set 2	Set 3	Total	Report
13 Aug	18:00	Paulikienė–Raupelytė (Lithuania)	2–1	(Norway) Helland-Hansen–Olimstad	11–21	21–18	15–13	47–52	Report
13 Aug	19:00	Klinger–Klinger (Austria)	0–2	(Netherlands) Bröring–van Driel	22–24	21–23		43–47	Report
14 Aug	09:50	Klinger–Klinger (Austria)	2–1	(Norway) Helland-Hansen–Olimstad	20–22	26–24	15–10	61–56	Report
14 Aug	10:00	Paulikienė–Raupelytė (Lithuania)	2–1	(Netherlands) Bröring–van Driel	21–15	20–22	15–12	56–49	Report
14 Aug	17:00	Klinger–Klinger (Austria)	1–2	(Lithuania) Paulikienė–Raupelytė	16–21	21–14	13–15	50–50	Report
14 Aug	17:00	Helland-Hansen–Olimstad (Norway)	0–2	(Netherlands) Bröring–van Driel	14–21	12–21		26–42	Report

=== Knockout stage ===
==== Bracket ====
Round of 24
15 August
(Italy) Orsi Toth–Bianchi	2
(Germany) Schieder–Borger	1
15 August
(Spain) Álvarez–Moreno	0
(Finland) Ahtiainen–Lahti-Liukkonen	2
15 August
(Netherlands) Bröring–van Driel	2
(Netherlands) Konink–Poiesz	0
15 August
(Lithuania) Dumbauskaitė–Vasiliauskaitė	0
(Austria) Klinger–Klinger	2
15 August
(Germany) Ludwig–Lippmann	2
(Netherlands) Piersma–Bekhuis	0
15 August
(Poland) Śliwka–Wachowicz	2
(Czech Republic) Dunarova–Daniela	0
15 August
(Germany) Schneider–Kozuch	2
(Belgium) Cools–Van den Vonder	0
15 August
(Austria) Plesiutschnig–Schützenhöfer	1
(Netherlands) Stam–Schoon	2

Round of 16
16 August
(Switzerland) A. Vergé-Dépré–Mäder	2
(Italy) Orsi Toth–Bianchi	1
16 August
(Italy) Gottardi–Menegatti	2
(Finland) Ahtiainen–Lahti-Liukkonen	0
16 August
(Czech Republic) Hermannová–Štochlová	2
(Netherlands) Bröring–van Driel	0
16 August
(Lithuania) Paulikienė–Raupelytė	2
(Austria) Klinger–Klinger	0
16 August
(Latvia) Graudiņa–Samoilova	2
(Germany) Ludwig–Lippmann	0
16 August
(Germany) Müller–Tillmann	2
(Poland) Śliwka–Wachowicz	0
16 August
(Switzerland) Böbner–Z. Vergé-Dépré	2
(Germany) Schneider–Kozuch	1
16 August
(Ukraine) Hladun–Lazarenko	0
(Netherlands) Stam–Schoon	2

Quarter-finals
16 August
(Switzerland) A. Vergé-Dépré–Mäder	1
(Italy) Gottardi–Menegatti	2
16 August
(Czech Republic) Hermannová–Štochlová	0
(Lithuania) Paulikienė–Raupelytė	2
16 August
(Latvia) Graudiņa–Samoilova	1
(Germany) Müller–Tillmann	2
16 August
(Switzerland) Böbner–Z. Vergé-Dépré	2
(Netherlands) Stam–Schoon	0

Semi-finals
17 August
(Italy) Gottardi–Menegatti	2
(Lithuania) Paulikienė–Raupelytė	1
17 August
(Germany) Müller–Tillmann	2
(Switzerland) Böbner–Z. Vergé-Dépré	0

Final
17 August
(Italy) Gottardi–Menegatti	0
(Germany) Müller–Tillmann	2
3rd Place
17 August
(Lithuania) Paulikienė–Raupelytė	0
(Switzerland) Böbner–Z. Vergé-Dépré	2

==== Round of 24 ====
Date	Time		Score		Set 1	Set 2	Set 3	Total	Report
15 Aug	15:00	Orsi Toth–Bianchi (Italy)	2–1	(Germany) Schieder–Borger	18–21	21–19	15–9	54–49	Report
15 Aug	15:00	Álvarez–Moreno (Spain)	0–2	(Finland) Ahtiainen–Lahti-Liukkonen	19–21	18–21		37–42	Report
15 Aug	16:00	Bröring–van Driel (Netherlands)	2–0	(Netherlands) Konink–Poiesz	21–18	28–26		49–44	Report
15 Aug	16:00	Dumbauskaitė–Vasiliauskaitė (Lithuania)	0–2	(Austria) Klinger–Klinger	16–21	17–21		33–42	Report
15 Aug	16:45	Śliwka–Wachowicz (Poland)	2–0	(Czech Republic) Dunarova–Daniela	21–14	34–32		55–46	Report
15 Aug	17:00	Schneider–Kozuch (Germany)	2–0	(Belgium) Cools–Van den Vonder	21–19	21–12		42–31	Report
15 Aug	18:00	Ludwig–Lippmann (Germany)	2–0	(Netherlands) Piersma–Bekhuis	21–16	21–19		42–35	Report
15 Aug	18:00	Plesiutschnig–Schützenhöfer (Austria)	1–2	(Netherlands) Stam–Schoon	21–19	12–21	9–15	42–55	Report

==== Round of 16 ====
Date	Time		Score		Set 1	Set 2	Set 3	Total	Report
16 Aug	12:00	Böbner–Z. Vergé-Dépré (Switzerland)	2–1	(Germany) Schneider–Kozuch	17–21	21–16	15–9	53–46	Report
16 Aug	12:30	Müller–Tillmann (Germany)	2–0	(Poland) Śliwka–Wachowicz	21–15	21–14		42–29	Report
16 Aug	13:00	Hladun–Lazarenko (Ukraine)	0–2	(Netherlands) Stam–Schoon	18–21	17–21		35–42	Report
16 Aug	13:30	Graudiņa–Samoilova (Latvia)	2–0	(Germany) Ludwig–Lippmann	21–12	21–18		42–30	Report
16 Aug	15:00	A. Vergé-Dépré–Mäder (Switzerland)	2–1	(Italy) Orsi Toth–Bianchi	14–21	27–25	15–13	56–59	Report
16 Aug	15:00	Gottardi–Menegatti (Italy)	2–0	(Finland) Ahtiainen–Lahti-Liukkonen	21–12	21–8		42–20	Report
16 Aug	16:00	Hermannová–Štochlová (Czech Republic)	2–0	(Netherlands) Bröring–van Driel	21–19	21–13		42–32	Report
16 Aug	16:00	Paulikienė–Raupelytė (Lithuania)	2–0	(Austria) Klinger–Klinger	25–23	21–18		46–41	Report

==== Quarterfinals ====
Date	Time		Score		Set 1	Set 2	Set 3	Total	Report
16 Aug	18:30	Graudiņa–Samoilova (Latvia)	1–2	(Germany) Müller–Tillmann	21–18	13–21	13–15	47–54	Report
16 Aug	19:35	Böbner–Z. Vergé-Dépré (Switzerland)	2–0	(Netherlands) Stam–Schoon	21–19	21–18		42–37	Report
16 Aug	20:00	A. Vergé-Dépré–Mäder (Switzerland)	1–2	(Italy) Gottardi–Menegatti	19–21	21–14	10–15	50–50	Report
16 Aug	21:00	Hermannová–Štochlová (Czech Republic)	0–2	(Lithuania) Paulikienė–Raupelytė	21–23	13–21		34–44	Report

==== Semifinals ====
Date	Time		Score		Set 1	Set 2	Set 3	Total	Report
17 Aug	14:30	Müller–Tillmann (Germany)	2–0	(Switzerland) Böbner–Z. Vergé-Dépré	21–13	21–16		42–29	Report
17 Aug	13:15	Gottardi–Menegatti (Italy)	2–1	(Lithuania) Paulikienė–Raupelytė	17–21	21–19	20–18	58–58	Report

==== Third place game ====
Date	Time		Score		Set 1	Set 2	Set 3	Total	Report
17 Aug	18:45	Paulikienė–Raupelytė (Lithuania)	0–2	(Switzerland) Böbner–Z. Vergé-Dépré	20–22	14–21		34–43	Report

==== Final ====
Date	Time		Score		Set 1	Set 2	Set 3	Total	Report
17 Aug	20:00	Gottardi–Menegatti (Italy)	0–2	(Germany) Müller–Tillmann	17–21	18–21		35–42	Report
