= Jean Claes =

Jean Claes can refer to:

- Jean Claes (footballer, born 1902)
- Jean Claes (footballer, born 1934)
- Jean-Baptiste Claes, Belgian racing cyclist
