= Kelly Cheng =

American beach volleyball player

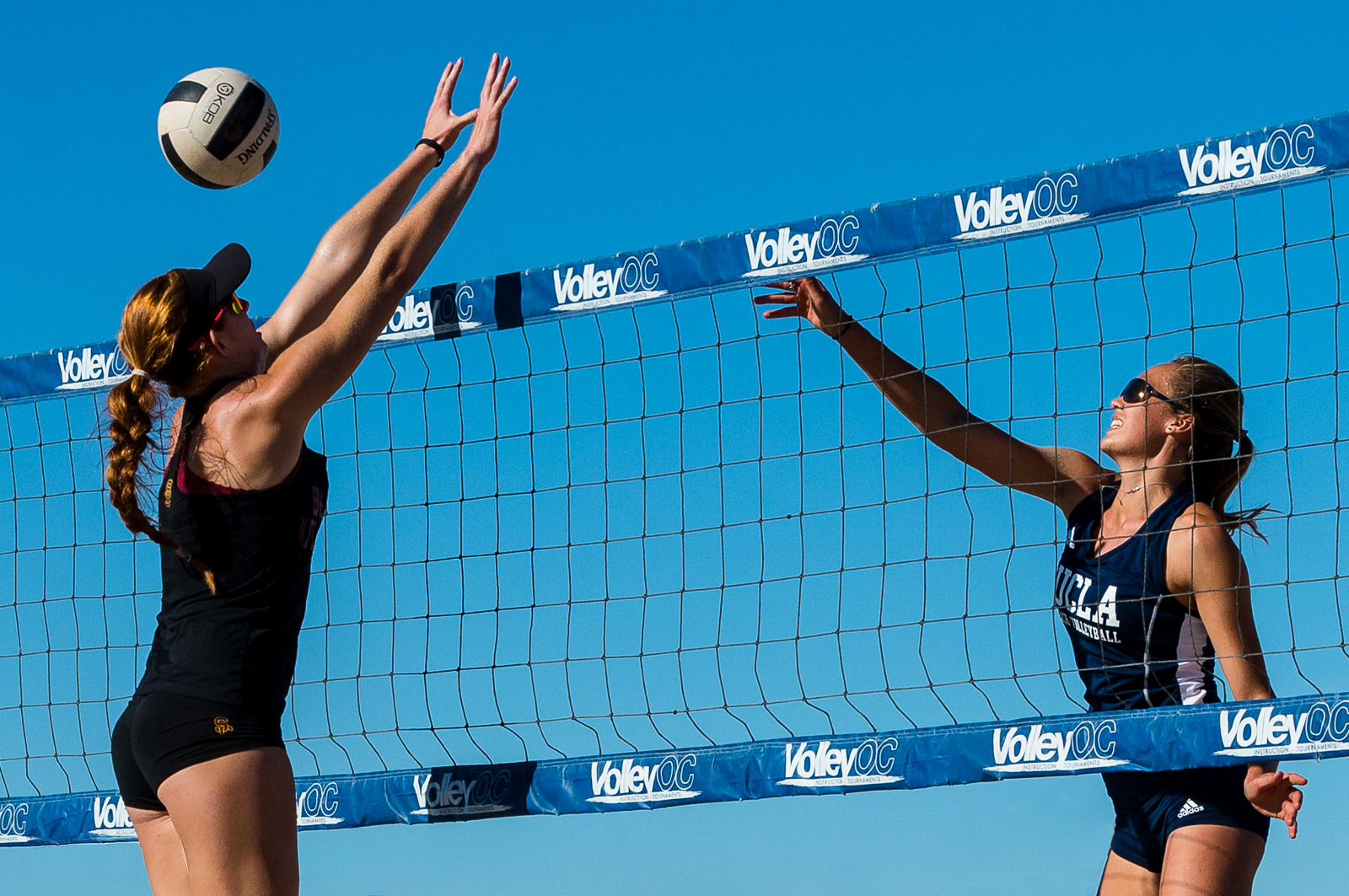
- Cheng attempting to block a volleyball in 2016

Personal information
- Full name: Kelly Marie Cheng
- Born: Kelly Marie Claes; September 18, 1995 (age 31) Fullerton, California, U.S.
- Height: 6 ft 2 in (188 cm)

Sport
- Country: United States
- Sport: Beach volleyball
- College team: USC Trojans
- Partner: Megan Kraft (2026–)
- Former partners: Sara Hughes (2013–18, 2022–25); Sarah Sponcil (2018–2021); Betsi Flint (2021–2022)
Medal record
Women's beach volleyball
Representing the United States
World Championships
Gold medal – first place	2023 Tlaxcala	Beach
World Tour Finals
Gold medal – first place	2022 Doha	Beach
World Tour
Gold medal – first place	2021 Sochi	Beach
Gold medal – first place	2021 Ostrava	Beach
Gold medal – first place	2022 Hamburg	Beach
Gold medal – first place	2022 Torquay	Beach
Gold medal – first place	2022 Torquay	Beach
Gold medal – first place	2023 Tepic	Beach
Gold medal – first place	2024 Ostrava	Beach
Silver medal – second place	2018 Xiamen	Beach
Silver medal – second place	2019 The Hague	Beach
Silver medal – second place	2019 Espinho	Beach
Silver medal – second place	2023 Gstaad	Beach
Bronze medal – third place	2019 Qinzhou	Beach
Bronze medal – third place	2024 Doha	Beach

Kelly Marie Cheng (née Claes, born September 18, 1995) is an American beach volleyball player. She and her partner Sara Hughes won the bronze medal at the 2013 U19 World Championships, the silver medal at the 2014 U21 World Championships, the gold medal at the 2023 FIVB Beach Volleyball World Championships and back-to-back NCAA Championships in 2016 and 2017.

== Early life ==
Kelly Claes was born in Fullerton, California, to Paul Claes, a former San Diego State baseball player, and Quincy Claes. She played high school volleyball at El Dorado High School in Placentia, California, where she was awarded All-CIF Division 1A and Orange County Register All-Orange County first team honors. Along with partner Sara Hughes, she won the bronze medal at the 2013 FIVB Beach Volleyball U19 World Championships and the silver medal at the 2014 FIVB Beach Volleyball U21 World Championships.

== College ==
Claes began playing volleyball at the University of Southern California with partner Alexa Strange in 2014. During her sophomore year, she rejoined former partner Sara Hughes and won the AVCA Pairs National Championship. Claes was named a 2015 AVCA All-American. During their junior and senior years Claes and Hughes led the USC Trojans to back-to-back NCAA Championships in 2016 and 2017. In 2016, Claes won the inaugural Pac-12 Player of the Year award along with Pac-12 Pair of the Year and the Pac-12 Pairs Championship with Hughes. Claes graduated in 2017 with a degree in sociology.

== Professional career ==
=== 2017-2019, 2024: Partnering with Hughes ===
In her first year as a professional, Claes won her first AVP Gold Series Championships in Chicago with college partner Sara Hughes. The duo became the youngest team to win an AVP event. Hughes split from Claes in early 2018. They reunited to compete in the 2024 Olympics, but were eliminated in the quarterfinals. Cheng and Hughes beat France and Germany in pool play, but lost to a Swiss team.

=== 2018-2022: Partnering with Sarah Sponcil ===
Claes then teamed up with Sarah Sponcil. The duo won the silver medal at the 2019 FIVB four-star event in The Hague and then qualified for the 2020 Olympics in Tokyo after winning gold medals in Sochi and Ostrava. Claes tied for 9th place at the 2020 Olympics in Tokyo with partner Sarah Sponcil. Following her marriage to her coach Jordan Cheng in 2022, she changed her name to Kelly Cheng.

=== 2026-Present: Partnering with Megan Kraft ===
Cheng partnered with USC Beach Volleyball alumni, Megan Kraft, in January of 2026. The duo is coached by Kelly's husband, Jordan Cheng. In their first year as a pair, they qualified and competed in the AVP League. They also won the 2026 Hermosa Beach Open. Their initial goal as a partnership was to incorporate jump setting into their game. Jump setting is a new style of setting that is aimed to trick the defense by jumping while setting your partner.

== Personal life ==
Cheng is a Christian. She married her coach Jordan Cheng in 2022.
