= Allessia Claes =

Belgian politician

Member of the Flemish Parliament
- Incumbent
- Assumed office 2019

Senator
- Incumbent
- Assumed office 2019

Personal details
- Born: 19 November 1981 (age 44) Hasselt
- Party: N-VA

Allessia Claes (born 1981) is a Belgian politician and a member of the New Flemish Alliance.

Claes took part in elections for the first time in the municipal elections of 2012 in her hometown of Scherpenheuvel-Zichem and became a councilor for the town. She was the party leader and candidate mayor for the N-VA in the 2018 municipal elections in Scherpenheuvel-Zichem. She became party leader for the five-member N-VA faction in the city council. In those elections she also stood for the provincial council from 14th place. In the 2019 Belgian regional elections, Claes was elected as a Flemish Member of Parliament on the list of the N-VA in the Constituency of Flemish Brabant with 10,260 preference votes. She was also sent to the Senate as a state senator.
