= Willy Claes (weightlifter) =

Belgian weightlifter (1937–2017)

Personal information
- Nationality: Belgian
- Born: 6 February 1937; Saint-Gilles, Belgium
- Died: 2017 (aged 79–80)

Sport
- Sport: Weightlifting

Willy Claes (6 February 1937 – 2017) was a Belgian weightlifter. He competed at the 1956 Summer Olympics and the 1960 Summer Olympics.
