= Steven van de Velde =

Dutch beach volleyball player (born 1994)

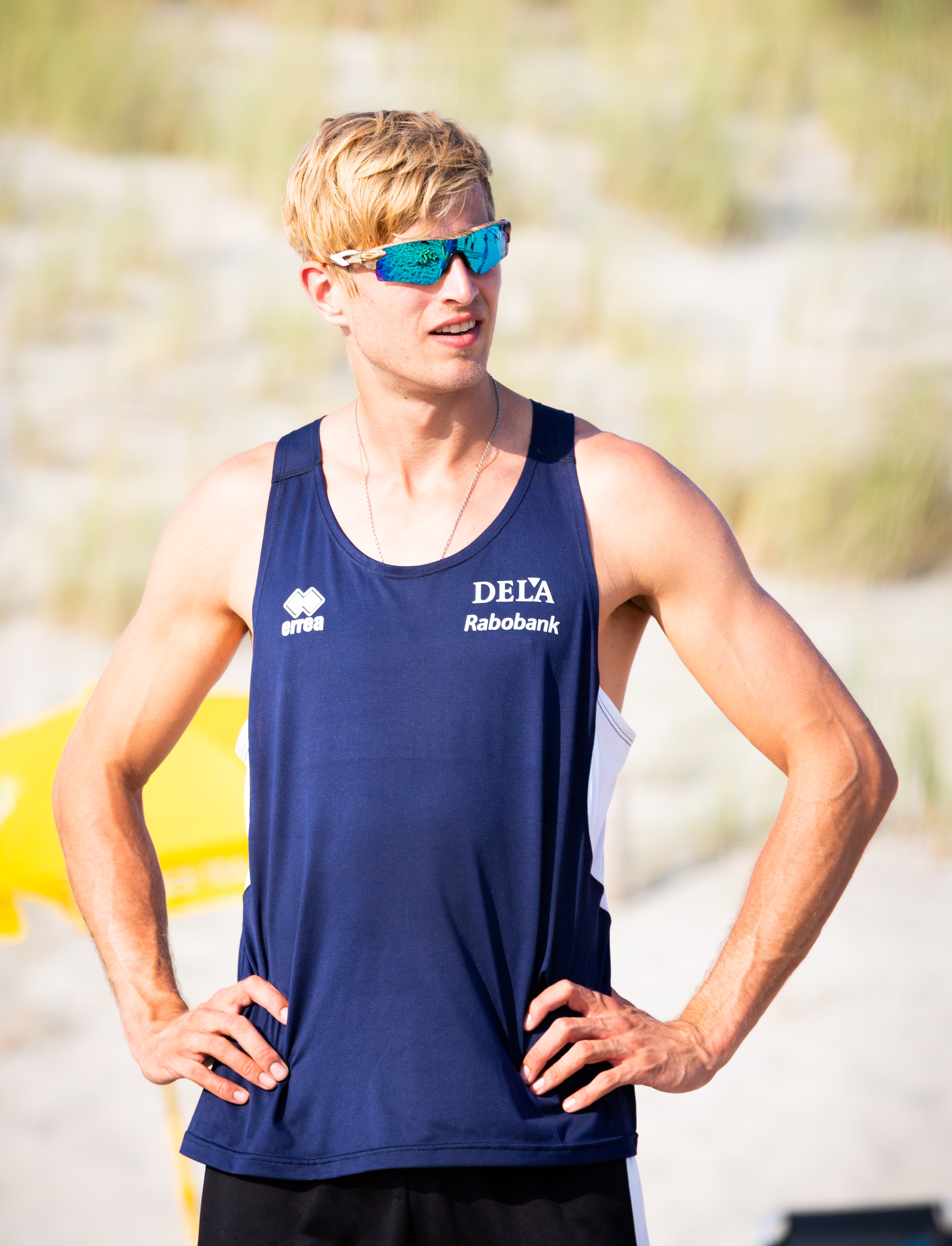
- Van de Velde in 2020

Personal information
- Born: 8 August 1994 (age 32) The Hague, Netherlands
- Height: 1.99 m (6 ft 6 in)
Beach volleyball information
- Years: Teammate
- –: 2011–2012 Jeffery van Wijk; 2013 Daan Spijkers; 2013–2015 Michiel van Dorsten; 2015–2018 Dirk Boehlé; 2019–2022 Christiaan Varenhorst; 2023–2024 Matthew Immers; 2025-2025 Alexander Brouwer; 2026–present Yorick de Groot
Honours
Representing Netherlands
Beach volleyball
European Championships
Bronze medal – third place	2024 Netherlands	Beach
Bronze medal – third place	2025 Düsseldorf	Beach
- Criminal information
- Conviction: Rape of a child under 13 (3 counts)
- Penalty: Four years in prison
- Capture status: Released on licence after serving 13 months

Details
- Victims: 12-year-old girl
- Date: 2 August 2014

Steven van de Velde (Dutch pronunciation: [ˈsteːvə(ɱ) vɑn də ˈvɛldə]; born 8 August 1994) is a Dutch beach volleyball player. He was convicted of child rape in 2016; in 2014, when Van de Velde was 19, he raped a 12-year-old British girl, after contacting her on social media, travelling to Britain to meet her, and giving her alcohol. He returned to sport in 2018 and participated in the 2024 Summer Olympics, with the Dutch Olympic Committee standing by their nomination despite a petition calling for him to be removed. The same year, he won a bronze medal at the 2024 European Championships.

== Volleyball career ==
Van de Velde won the Under-20 Dutch National Championships in 2011. With Michiel van Dorsten, he represented the Netherlands at the 2015 European Games.

After being released from prison in 2017 following a conviction for child rape, the Dutch Volleyball Association allowed Van de Velde to resume his career as a beach volleyball player, and he returned to international competition in 2018. With Dirk Boehlé, he finished third at the Blooming Beach Aalsmeer of the 2018 FIVB Beach Volleyball World Tour.

=== 2024 Summer Olympics ===
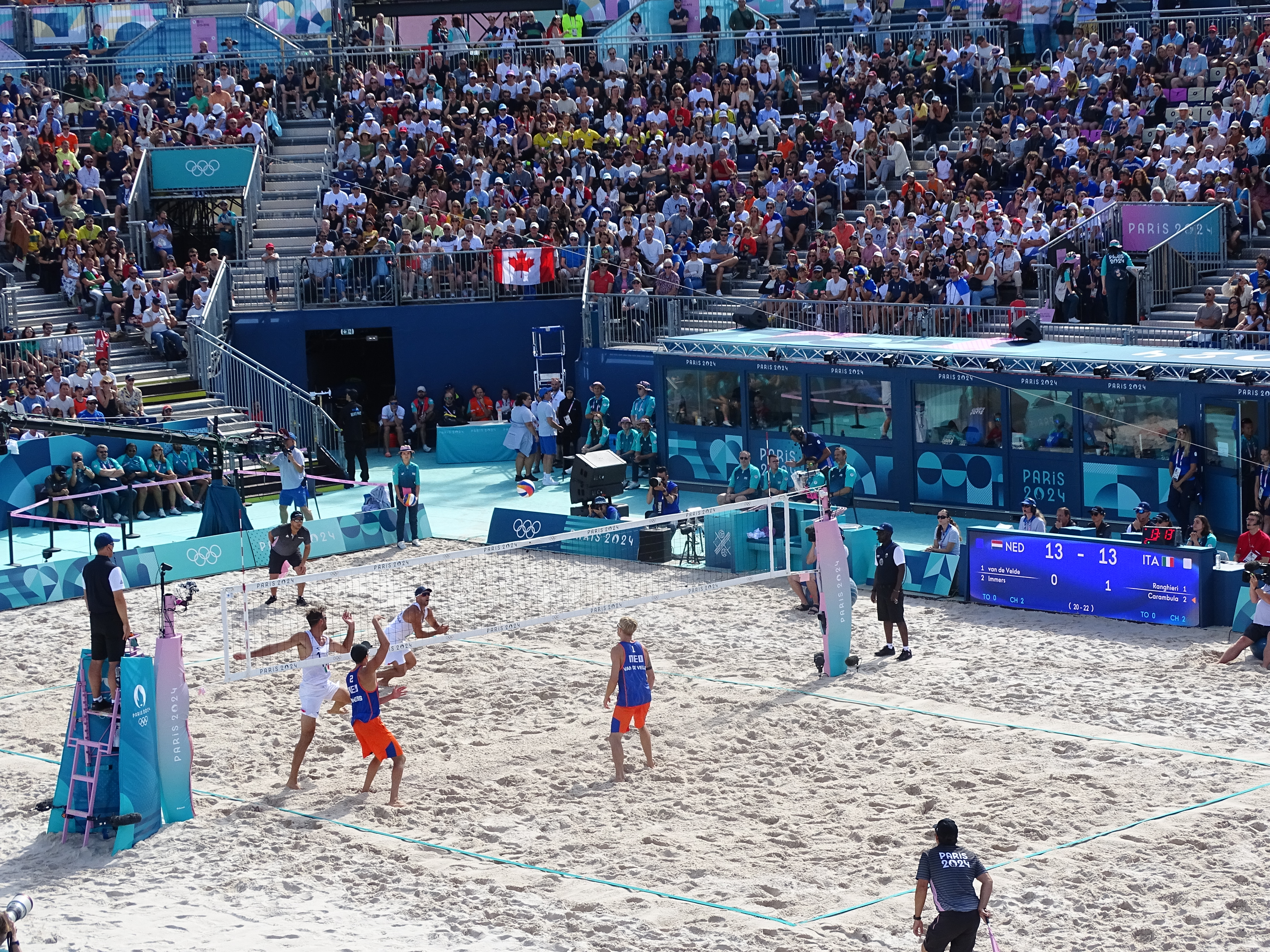
Van de Velde and Matthew Immers playing against Italy at the 2024 Summer Olympics

In June 2024, Van de Velde qualified to play beach volleyball on behalf of the Netherlands Olympic Team. In order to "establish calm", the Dutch Olympic Committee isolated Van de Velde from the rest of the Dutch team, and barred him from talking to media. An online petition calling for his removal from the Olympics had over 100,000 supporters. After his first match at the Olympics, Dutch Olympic committee press secretary John van Vliet said: "We are protecting a convicted child rapist, yes ... To do his sport as best as possible, at a tournament he qualified for." NOC*NSF, the Dutch National Olympic Committee, decided to neither house him with the other athletes at the Olympic Village, nor to allow him to speak to journalists. The Committee apologized for the psychological effect of Van de Velde's nomination on sexual assault victims, saying they did not expect it to attract so much attention.

Van de Velde made his Olympic debut at Paris 2024 alongside partner Matthew Immers on 28 July 2024, losing the match against Italy's Alex Ranghieri and Adrian Carambula by two sets to one. Van de Velde was booed when his name was announced, as well as during the match, while Immers was cheered, and some fans applauded for Van de Velde. Both Immers and Van de Velde were booed more frequently during the match they won against Marco and Esteban Grimalt of Chile, with Immers saying that he was disappointed in the crowd. Immers later said that he understood the commotion, but that he was also surprised since they had been playing together for two years. This was the only match the pair won at the Olympics; after losing two of three group matches, they advanced to the round of 16, where they played Brazilian pair Evandro Oliveira and Arthur Lanci. Van de Velde and Immers were beaten in straight sets by the Brazilians and were eliminated from the Olympics.

In an August 2024 interview with Nederlandse Omroep Stichting, Van de Velde stated that he had considered quitting the Olympics due to the controversy surrounding his participation, but decided to continue playing.

=== 2024 European Volleyball Championships ===
Two weeks after the Olympics, Immers and Van de Velde won a bronze medal at the 2024 European Beach Volleyball Championships in the Netherlands.

=== 2025 Beach Volleyball World Championships in Australia ===
Van de Velde was banned from entering Australia ahead of the 2025 Beach Volleyball World Championships in Adelaide due to his criminal history. A Change.org petition calling for him to be banned from entering Australia has gained over 4,100 signatures. South Australia Attorney General spearheaded this campaign, writing a letter to the federal government saying that "we do not believe that foreign child sex offenders should be granted entry to this country".

== Personal life ==
Van de Velde is married to Kim van de Velde (née Behrens), a German volleyball player who studied psychology and trained to become a police officer. They have one child. His brother-in-law is German footballer Kevin Behrens.

=== Child rape ===
In 2014, Van de Velde, aged 19, met with a 12-year-old girl who sent him a friend request on Facebook. In August 2014, aware of her age, he travelled to her home town, Milton Keynes, gave her alcohol and raped her. That same night, Van de Velde tried to stay at a hotel with his victim but was denied a room, so they slept under a staircase. Van de Velde raped the victim twice the next day. During one of the three rapes, the victim told Van de Velde that he was hurting her.

Van de Velde returned to the Netherlands after the rapes and told his victim to go to a sexual health clinic for emergency contraception. He was extradited to the United Kingdom and arrested in January 2016.

==== Sentencing and release ====
In March 2016, Van de Velde pleaded guilty at Aylesbury Crown Court to three counts of child rape, specifically the charge of rape of a child under the age of 13. The judge sentenced Van de Velde to four years' imprisonment and placed him on the UK sex offender registry, where his name remains. During his sentencing remarks, the judge said, "Your hopes of representing your country [as an Olympic athlete] now lie as a shattered dream" and "he has lost a stellar sports career being branded a rapist. Plainly it is a career end for him".

Under a treaty between the Netherlands and UK, Van de Velde was transferred to the Netherlands to serve his sentence. The sentence was adjusted in line with Dutch law, and the charge of rape was substituted for one referring to ontucht ("sexual acts that violate social-ethical norms"). After serving 13 months of his original four-year sentence, he was released from prison. Until 1 July 2024, Dutch law only recognised rape if force was involved.

After his release in 2017, Van de Velde complained about "all the nonsense" reporting on his crime in the media, claiming that the term pedophile did not apply to him. He also said he had not read the reporting he was criticizing. The National Society for the Prevention of Cruelty to Children (NSPCC) in Britain condemned his comments at the time, stating that his "lack of remorse and self-pity is breathtaking". He later claimed that he "made that choice in my life when I wasn't ready, I was a teenager still figuring things out. I was sort of lost". He has described it as "the biggest mistake of my life". His later participation in the Olympics was criticized by The Survivors Trust as a "further endorsement of the shocking toleration [as a society that] we have of child sexual abuse".

== See also ==
- List of professional sportspeople convicted of crimes
