= Valentina Gottardi =

Italian beach volleyball player (born 2002)

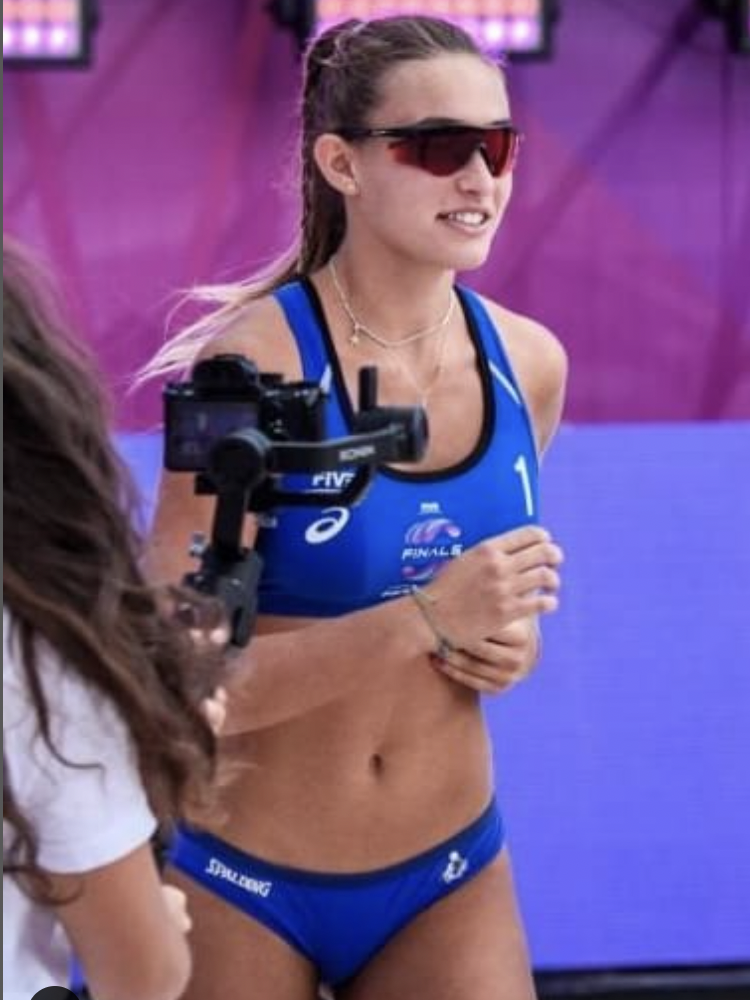
- Gottardi in 2021

Personal information
- Nationality: Italian
- Born: 19 November 2002 (age 23) Modena, Italy
- Height: 186 cm (6 ft 1 in)
Beach volleyball information
Current teammate
- Years: Teammate
- –: Reka Orsi Toth
Honours
Women's beach volleyball
Representing Italy
European Championships
| Silver medal – second place | 2024 Netherlands | Women's |

Valentina Gottardi (born 19 November 2002) is an Italian beach volleyball player. With Marta Menegatti, she competed at 2024 Summer Olympics in Paris.

Gottardi is originally from Modena and currently lives in Formia.
