= Jean Claes (footballer, born 1934) =

Belgian footballer

Personal information
- Date of birth: 7 August 1934
- Date of death: 5 January 2004 (aged 69)
- Position: Defender

International career
Years	Team	Apps	(Gls)
1959	Belgium	1	(0)

Jean Claes (7 August 1934 – 5 January 2004) was a Belgian football defender He played in one match for the Belgium national football team in 1959.
