= Zoé Vergé-Dépré =

Swiss beach volleyball player

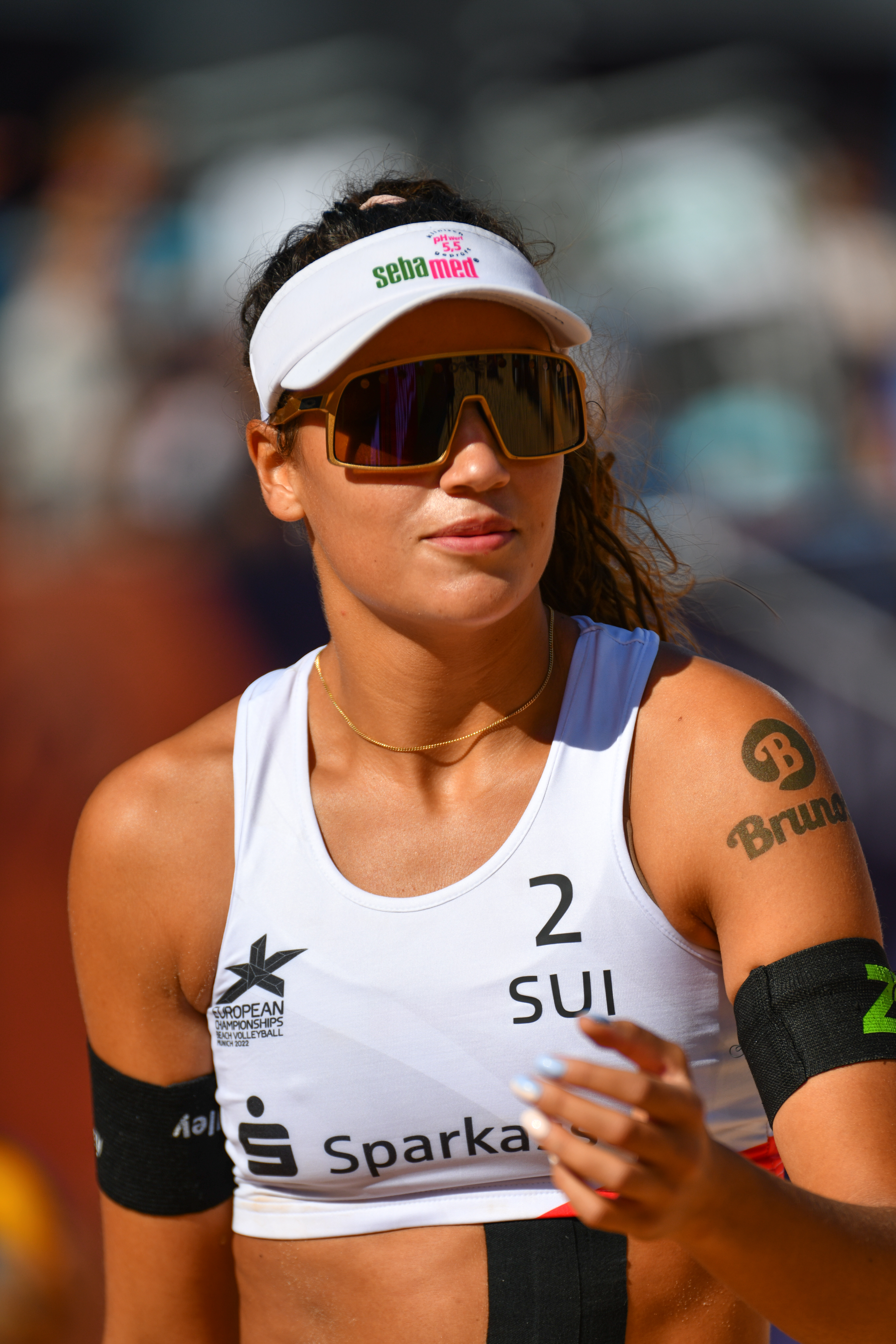
- Vergé-Dépré in 2022

Personal information
- Nationality: Swiss
- Born: 23 February 1998 (age 28) Bern, Switzerland
- Height: 182 cm (6 ft 0 in)
Beach volleyball information
Current teammate
- Years: Teammate
- 2018, 2025: Anouk Vergé-Dépré
Previous teammates
- Years: Teammate
- 2017–2024: Esmée Böbner
Honours
Beach volleyball
Representing Switzerland
European Championships
Bronze medal – third place	2024 Netherlands	Beach
World Beach Pro Tour
Gold medal – first place	2024 Guadalajara	Beach
Silver medal – second place	2023 Jurmala	Beach
Bronze medal – third place	2024 Brasília	Beach
Bronze medal – third place	2025 Ostrava	Beach

Zoé Vergé-Dépré (born 23 February 1998) is a Swiss beach volleyball player. With Esmée Böbner she played at the 2024 Summer Olympics in Paris.

== Biography ==
=== Career ===
She participated in the 2024 Olympic Games with Esmée Böbner and finished in fifth place.

In August 2024, she won a bronze medal at the European Championships with Esmée Böbner.

=== Personal life ===
Zoé Vergé-Dépré is in a relationship with Jason Joseph.

She has a sister Anouk Vergé-Dépré who is a beach volleyball player.
