= Jean Claes (footballer, born 1902) =

Belgian footballer

Personal information
- Date of birth: 10 July 1902
- Date of death: 1 March 1979 (aged 76)
- Position: Defender

International career
Years	Team	Apps	(Gls)
1925	Belgium	1	(0)

Jean Claes (10 July 1902 – 1 March 1979) was a Belgian footballer. He played in one match for the Belgium national football team in 1925.
