= Esmée Böbner =

Swiss beach volleyball player

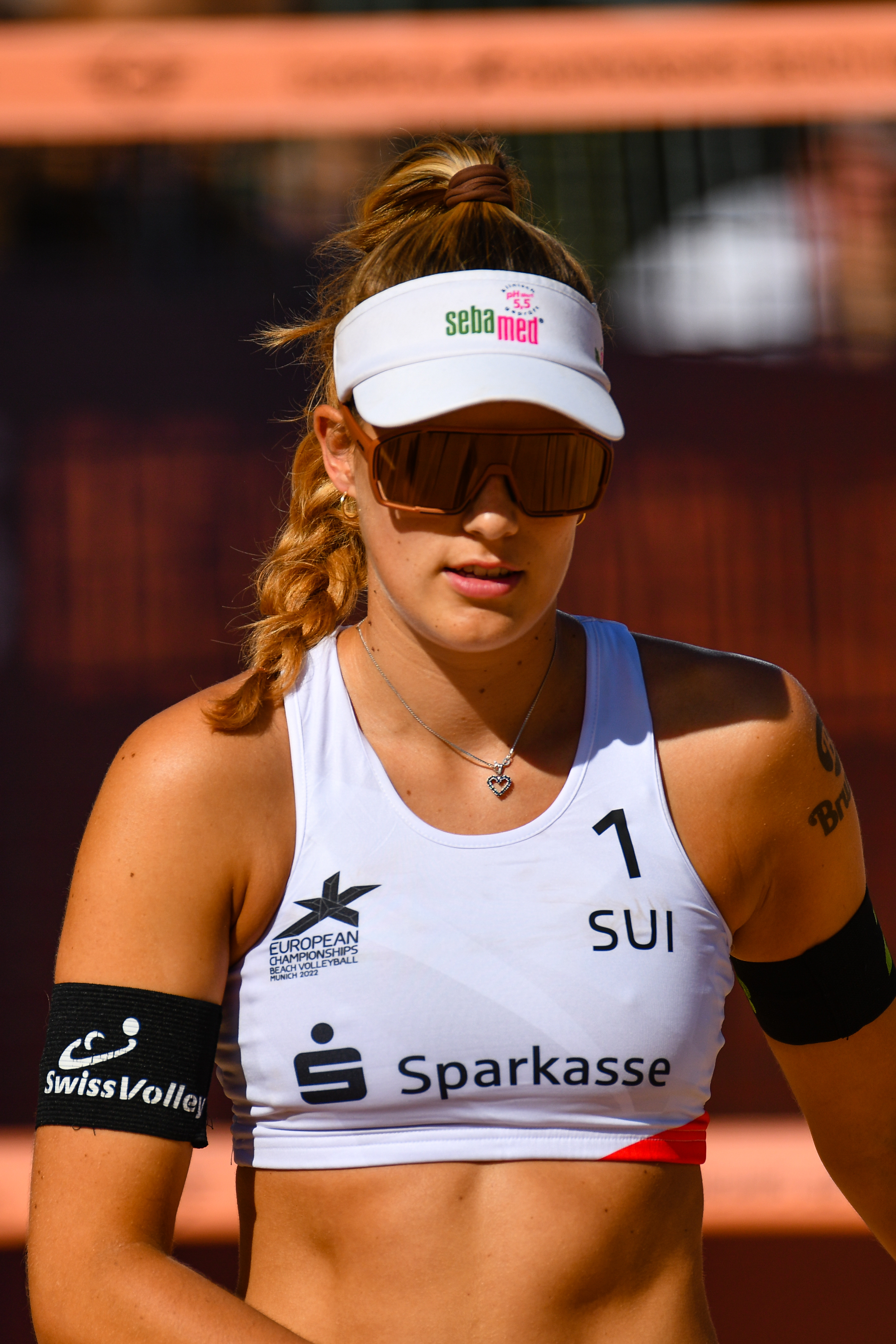
- Böbner in 2022

Personal information
- Nationality: Swiss
- Born: 3 November 1999 (age 26); Hasle, Entlebuch, Lucerne
- Height: 184 cm (6 ft 0 in)

Beach volleyball information
Years	Teammate
2017–2024	Zoé Vergé-Dépré
Honours
Beach volleyball
Representing Switzerland
European Championships
Bronze medal – third place	2024 Netherlands	Women's
World Beach Pro Tour
Gold medal – first place	2024 Guadalajara	Beach
Silver medal – second place	2023 Jurmala	Beach
Bronze medal – third place	2024 Brasília	Beach

Esmée Böbner (born 3 November 1999) is a Swiss beach volleyball player. With Zoé Vergé-Dépré she played at the 2024 Summer Olympics in Paris.

== Biography ==
=== Career ===
She participated in the 2024 Olympic Games with Zoé Vergé-Dépré and finished in fifth place.

In August 2024, she won a bronze medal at the European Championships with Zoé Vergé-Dépré.

In August 2024, she announced that she would end her beach volleyball career.
