= Alexia Richard =

French beach volleyball player

Personal information
- Nationality: French
- Born: 3 April 1996 (age 30); La Teste-de-Buch, France
- Height: 184 cm (6 ft 0 in)

Beach volleyball information

Current teammate
Teammate
Lézana Placette

Alexia Richard (born 3 April 1996) is a French beach volleyball player. She partnered with Lézana Placette at the 2024 Summer Olympics in Paris and at the 2014 Summer Youth Olympics in Nanjing.
