= Lézana Placette =

French beach volleyball player

Personal information
- Nationality: French
- Born: 11 December 1997 (age 28)
- Height: 180 cm (5 ft 11 in)

Beach volleyball information

Current teammate
Teammate
Alexia Richard

Lézana Placette (born 11 December 1997) is a French beach volleyball player. She is partnered with Alexia Richard at the 2024 Summer Olympics in Paris.
