= Ainė Raupelytė =

Lithuanian beach volleyball player (born 2000)

Personal information
- Nationality: Lithuanian
- Born: 28 July 2000 (age 26); Vilnius, Lithuania
- Height: 197 cm (6 ft 6 in)

Beach volleyball information

Current teammate
Teammate
Monika Paulikienė

Ainė Raupelytė (born 28 July 2000) is a Lithuanian beach volleyball player. With Monika Paulikienė she played at 2024 Summer Olympics in Paris.
