= 2024 in volleyball =

The following were volleyball-related events during 2024 throughout the world.

== Beach volleyball ==
=== Olympic Games ===
- July 27 – August 11: 2024 Summer Olympics in (France) Paris

=== Continental Championships ===
- March 10–14: 2023 African Games in (Ghana) Accra
  - Men's winners: (Morocco) Mohamed Abicha & Soufiane El Gharouti
  - Women's winners: (Egypt) Doaa Elghobashy & Marwa Abdelhady
- August 13–18: 2024 European Beach Volleyball Championship in Netherlands

=== Continental Cups ===
- June 13–16: 2024 CEV Beach Volley Nations Cup Final in (Latvia) Jūrmala
- August 13–18: 2023–2024 AVC Beach Volleyball Continental Cup in Asia

=== 2024 Volleyball World Beach Pro Tour ===
World Beach Pro Tour Finals

- December 5–8: 2024 Volleyball World Beach Pro Tour Finals in (Qatar) Doha

Elite 16

- March 5–9: BV Elite 16 #1 in (Qatar) Doha
  - Men's winners: (Netherlands) Stefan Boermans & Yorick de Groot
  - Women's winners: (Brazil) Carolina Solberg Salgado & Bárbara Seixas
- April 17–21: BV Elite 16 #2 in (Mexico) Tepic
  - Men's winners: (Sweden) David Åhman & Jonatan Hellvig
  - Women's winners: (Switzerland) Tanja Hüberli & Nina Brunner
- May 1–5: BV Elite #3 in (Brazil) Natal
  - Men's winners: (Brazil) Evandro Oliveira & Arthur Lanci
  - Women's winners: (Brazil) Ana Patrícia Ramos & Eduarda Santos Lisboa
- May 22–26: BV Elite #4 in (Portugal) Espinho
  - Men's winners: (Sweden) David Åhman & Jonatan Hellvig
  - Women's winners: (United States) Kristen Nuss & Taryn Kloth
- June 5–9: BV Elite 16 #5 in (Czech Republic) Ostrava
  - Men's winners: (Sweden) David Åhman & Jonatan Hellvig
  - Women's winners: (United States) Sara Hughes & Kelly Cheng
- July 3–7: BV Elite 16 #6 in (Switzerland) Gstaad
  - Men's winners: (Sweden) David Åhman & Jonatan Hellvig
  - Women's winners: (United States) Kristen Nuss & Taryn Kloth
- July 10–14: BV Elite 16 #7 in (Austria) Vienna
  - Men's winners: (Norway) Anders Mol & Christian Sørum
  - Women's winners: (Germany) Svenja Müller & Cinja Tillmann
- August 21–25: BV Elite 16 #8 in (Germany) Hamburg
- August 28 – September 1: BV Elite 16 #9 in (Canada) Montreal

Challenge

- March 20–24: BV Challenge #1 in (Brazil) Recife
  - Men's winner: (Brazil) Evandro Gonçalves Oliveira Júnior & Arthur Diego Mariano Lanci
  - Women's winner: (Latvia) Tīna Graudiņa & Anastasija Samoilova
- March 27–31: BV Challenge #2 in (Brazil) Saquarema
  - Men's winner: (Brazil) George Wanderley & André Stein
  - Women's winner: (China) Xue Chen & Xia Xinyi
- April 10–14: BV Challenge #3 in (Mexico) Guadalajara
  - Men's winner: (United States) Trevor Crabb & Theo Brunner
  - Women's winner: (Switzerland) Esmée Böbner & Zoé Vergé-Dépré
- April 24–28: BV Challenge #4 in (China) Xiamen
  - Men's winner: (Chile) Marco Grimalt & Esteban Grimalt
  - Women's winner: (Germany) Sandra Ittlinger & Karla Borger
- May 29 – June 2: BV Challenge #5 in (Poland) Stare Jabłonki
  - Men's winner: (Czech Republic) Ondřej Perušič & David Schweiner
  - Women's winner: (China) Xue Chen & Xia Xinyi
- October 17–20: BV Challenge #6 in (Brazil) João Pessoa
- November 21–24: BV Challenge #7 in (India) (location TBA)
- November 28 – December 1: BV Challenge #8 in the (Philippines) Nuvali

== Volleyball ==
=== FIVB ===
- May 14 – June 23: 2024 FIVB Volleyball Women's Nations League
  - winner: Italy
- May 21 – June 30: 2024 FIVB Volleyball Men's Nations League
  - winner: France

=== CEV ===
- November 22, 2023 – 5 May 2024: 2023–24 CEV Champions League
  - winner: (Italy) Itas Trentino
- November 7, 2023 – 5 May 2024 : 2023–24 CEV Women's Champions League
  - winner: (Italy) Imoco Volley Conegliano
- October 24, 2023 – March 19 2024: 2023–24 CEV Cup
  - winner: (Poland) Asseco Resovia
- November 7, 2023 – March 20 2024: 2023–24 Women's CEV Cup
  - winner: (Italy) Reale Mutua Fenera Chieri'76
- October, 2023 – February 27 2024: 2023–24 CEV Challenge Cup
  - winner: (Poland) Projekt Warsaw
- October, 2023 – February 28 2024: 2023–24 CEV Women's Challenge Cup
  - winner: (Italy) Igor Gorgonzola Novara

=== Domestic league seasons (incomplete) ===
==== Men ====
CEV

Nation	League	Champion	Second place	Title	Last honour
Albania	2024 Albanian Volleyball League				
Austria	2023–24 Austrian Volleyball Bundesliga	Hypo Tirol Innsbruck	TSV Hartberg Volleyball	12th	2023
Belgium	2023–24 Belgium Men's Volleyball League	Knack Roeselare	VC Greenyard Maaseik	15th	2023
France	2023–24 LNV Ligue A Masculine	Saint-Nazaire VBA	Tours VB	1st	
Germany	2023–24 Deutsche Volleyball-Bundesliga	Berlin Recycling Volleys	VfB Friedrichshafen	14th	2023
Italy	2023–24 Italian Volleyball League	Sir Safety Perugia	Volley Milano	2nd	2018
Netherlands	2023–24 Dutch Volleyball League	Active Living Orion	Dynamo Apeldoorn	1st	
Poland	2023–24 PlusLiga	Jastrzębski Węgiel	Aluron CMC Warta Zawiercie	4th	2023
Turkey	2023–24 Turkish Men's Volleyball League	Halkbank	Fenerbahçe	10th	2018

AVC

Nation	League	Champion	Second place	Title	Last honour
Bahrain	2023-24 Bahrain Volleyball League	Dar Kulaib	Al-Ahli Bahrain	4th	2023
India	2024 Prime Volleyball League	Calicut Heroes	Delhi Toofans		
Vietnam	2023-24 Vietnamese Volleyball League				

== Snow volleyball ==
=== CEV Snow Volleyball European Tour ===
- March 8–10: ET #1 in (Georgia (country)) Bakuriani
  - Men's winners: (Italy) Massimo Di Risio, Matteo Camozzi & Federico Geromin
  - Women's winners: (Turkey) Simge Yalçın, Merve Celebi, Yaren Sencel & Zeynep Dila Şahin
- March 12–15: ET #2 in (Turkey) Erzurum
  - Men's winners: (France) Daniel Petrov, Iskander El-Ghouti & Adrien Pédèches
  - Women's winners: (Turkey) Simge Yalçın, Merve Celebi, Yaren Sencel & Zeynep Dila Şahin
- March 29–31: ET #3 in (Italy) Prato Nevoso

=== Continental Championships ===
- March 1–3: 2024 CEV U20 Snow Volleyball European Championships in (Georgia (country)) Bakuriani
  - Men's winners: (Poland) Szymon Beta, Artem Besarab, Szymon Pietraszek & Jakub Krzemiński
  - Women's winners: (Czech Republic) Tereza Novotná, Kateřina Pavelková & Anna Pavelková
