= 2025 Volleyball World Beach Pro Tour =

International beach volleyball competition

Tournament details
- Host country: Various
- Dates: 6 March – 19 October 2025

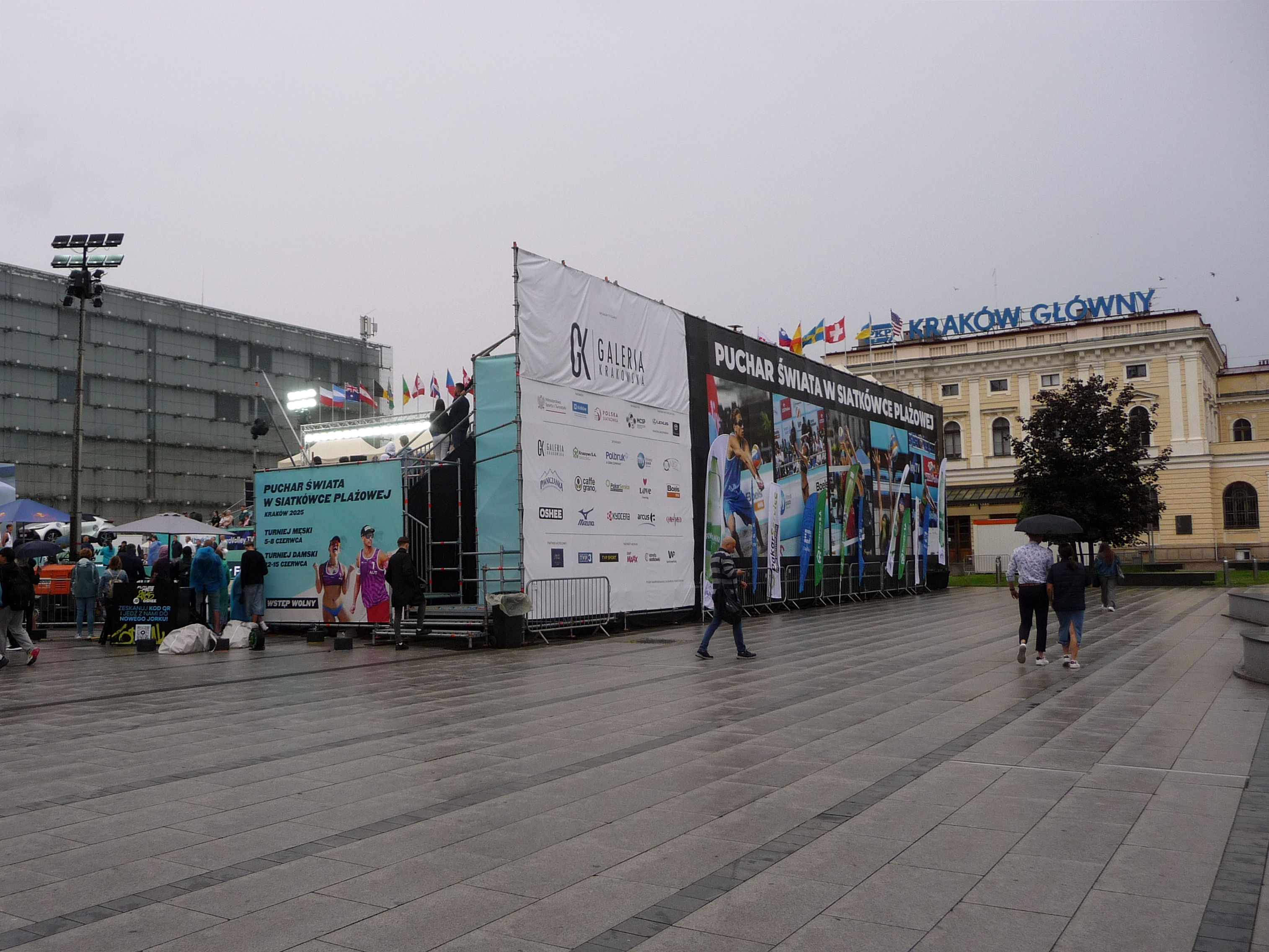
World Beach Pro Tour Futures Kraków, June 2025

The 2025 Volleyball World Beach Pro Tour is the fourth edition of the global elite professional beach volleyball circuit organized by the Fédération Internationale de Volleyball (FIVB) for the 2025 beach volleyball season. Since March 2022, the Tour comprises three tiers: Future, Challenge and Elite 16. The season ends with The Finals featuring the 10 best teams in the world.

The Volleyball World Beach Pro Tour was established by FIVB in October 2021, thus it replaced the former FIVB Beach Volleyball World Tour.

== Schedule ==
Key

World Championships
Beach Pro Tour Finals
Elite 16
Challenge
Future

=== Men ===
Tournament	Champions	Runners-up	Third place	Fourth place
Mount Maunganui Future; Mount Maunganui, New Zealand; US$5,000; 7–9 March 2025	Bradley Fuller (NZL); Ben O'Dea (NZL); 21–19, 23–21	Thomas Hartles (NZL); John McManaway (NZL)	Jake Urrutia (USA); Derek Bradford (USA); 21–14, 21–17	Oliver Merritt (AUS); Jed Walker (AUS)
Yucatán Challenge; Puerto Progreso, Mexico; US$75,000; 20–23 March 2025	Ondřej Perušič (CZE); David Schweiner (CZE); 21–14, 21–12	Yves Haussener (SUI); Julian Friedli (SUI)	João Pedrosa (POR); Hugo Campos (POR); 21–12, 14–21, 21–19	Christoph Dressler (AUT); Philipp Waller (AUT)
Quintana Roo Elite 16; Playa del Carmen, Mexico; US$150,000; 27–30 March 2025	Noslen Díaz (CUB); Jorge Alayo (CUB); 21–13, 24–22	Tomás Capogrosso (ARG); Nicolás Capogrosso (ARG)	Chaim Schalk (USA); James Shaw (USA); 21–19, 21–16	Steven van de Velde (NED); Alexander Brouwer (NED)
Coolangatta Future; Coolangatta, Australia; US$5,000; 27–30 March 2025	Ben O'Dea (NZL); John McManaway (NZL); 21–13, 21–15	Momme Lorenz (GER); Tilo Rietschel (GER)	Finley Bennett (AUS); Jed Walker (AUS); 15–21, 24–22, 18–16	Garang Anyang (AUS); Justin Schumann (AUS)
Songkhla Future; Songkhla, Thailand; US$5,000; 9–11 April 2025	Eylon Elazar (ISR); Kevin Cuzmiciov (ISR); 21–13, 21–18	Alexander Huber (AUT); Robin Seidl (AUT)	Dunwinit Kaewsai (THA); Banlue Nakprakhong (THA); 21–18, 21–17	Momme Lorenz (GER); Tilo Rietschel (GER)
Saquarema Elite 16; Saquarema, Brazil; US$150,000; 10–13 April 2025	Anders Mol (NOR); Christian Sørum (NOR); 21–18, 21–15	David Åhman (SWE); Jonatan Hellvig (SWE)	Stefan Boermans (NED); Yorick de Groot (NED); 21–11, 21–14	Pedro Augusto Sousa (BRA); Renato Carvalho (BRA)
Brasília Elite 16; Brasília, Brazil; US$150,000; 17–20 April 2025	Stefan Boermans (NED); Yorick de Groot (NED); 21–18, 21–23, 18–16	Evandro Oliveira (BRA); Arthur Lanci (BRA)	Anders Mol (NOR); Christian Sørum (NOR); 21–16, 19–21, 20–18	Bartosz Łosiak (POL); Michał Bryl (POL)
Nuvali Future; Santa Rosa, Philippines; US$5,000; 2–4 May 2025	Luboš Němec (SVK); Adrián Petruf (SVK); 21–15, 18–21, 19–17	Eylon Elazar (ISR); Kevin Cuzmiciov (ISR)	Olivers Bulgačs (LAT); Markuss Graudiņš (LAT); 21–15, 19–21, 15–5	Stavros Ntallas (GRE); Dimitrios Chatzinikolaou (GRE)
Valencia Future; Valencia, Spain; US$5,000; 2–4 May 2025	Alejandro Huerta (ESP); Javier Huerta (ESP); 21–15, 21–9	Tiziano Andreatta (ITA); Davide Benzi (ITA)	Marco Krattiger (SUI); Leo Dillier (SUI); 21–19, 21–19	Alexander Huber (AUT); Robin Seidl (AUT)
Cervia Future; Cervia, Italy; US$5,000; 9–11 May 2025	Tiziano Andreatta (ITA); Davide Benzi (ITA); 21–16, 15–21, 17–15	Robin Sowa (GER); Jonas Reinhardt (GER)	Mads Møllgaard (DEN); Nicolai Overgaard (DEN); 21–16, 21–14	Momme Lorenz (GER); Tilo Rietschel (GER)
Madrid Future; Madrid, Spain; US$5,000; 9–11 May 2025	Tadeáš Trousil (CZE); Matyas Džavoronok (CZE); 21–11, 21–19	Nils Ringøen (NOR); Even Stray Aas (NOR)	Alejandro Huerta (ESP); Javier Huerta (ESP); 21–18, 21–19	Mathias Seiser (AUT); Laurenc Grössig (AUT)
Xiamen Challenge; Xiamen, China; US$75,000; 15–18 May 2025	Cherif Younousse (QAT); Ahmed Tijan (QAT); 21–14, 21–14	Marco Krattiger (SUI); Leo Dillier (SUI)	Téo Rotar (FRA); Arnaud Gauthier-Rat (FRA); 21–11, 21–12	Markus Mol (NOR); Adrian Mol (NOR)
Spiez Future; Spiez, Switzerland; US$5,000; 23–25 May 2025	Adrian Heidrich (SUI); Jonathan Jordan (SUI); 21–19, 21–14	Marco Krattiger (SUI); Leo Dillier (SUI)	Tadeáš Trousil (CZE); Matyas Džavoronok (CZE); 21–19, 21–14	Jędrzej Brożyniak (POL); Piotr Janiak (POL)
Wuhan Qingshan Future; Wuhan, China; US$5,000; 23–25 May 2025	Luboš Němec (SVK); Adrián Petruf (SVK); 21–18, 21–15	Frederick Bialokoz (ENG); Issa Batrane (ENG)	Wu Jiaxin (CHN); Zhou Chaowei (CHN) w/o	Domonkos Dóczi (HUN); Bence Stréli (HUN)
Ostrava Elite 16; Ostrava, Czech Republic; US$150,000; 28 May–1 June 2025	David Åhman (SWE); Jonatan Hellvig (SWE); 28–30, 21–17, 15–7	Anders Mol (NOR); Christian Sørum (NOR)	Ondřej Perušič (CZE); David Schweiner (CZE); 23–21, 21–13	Bartosz Łosiak (POL); Michał Bryl (POL)
Battipaglia Future; Battipaglia, Italy; US$5,000; 30 May–1 June 2025	Enrico Rossi (ITA); Marco Viscovich (ITA); 21–14, 21–16	Manuel Alfieri (ITA); Alex Ranghieri (ITA)	Robin Seidl (AUT); Alexander Huber (AUT); 21–19, 19–21, 17–15	Tiziano Andreatta (ITA); Davide Benzi (ITA)
Kraków Future; Kraków, Poland; US$5,000; 6–8 June 2025	Eylon Elazar (ISR); Kevin Cuzmiciov (ISR); 30–28, 21–14	Jędrzej Brożyniak (POL); Piotr Janiak (POL)	Mads Møllgaard (DEN); Nicolai Overgaard (DEN); 21–12, 18–21, 17–15	Tamo Wüst (GER); Tristan Fröbel (GER)
Prague Future; Prague, Czech Republic; US$5,000; 6–8 June 2025	Mees Sengers (NED); Leon Luini (NED); 21–16, 21–18	Jakub Šépka (CZE); Jiří Sedlák (CZE)	Tadeáš Trousil (CZE); Matyas Džavoronok (CZE); 21–19, 21–15	Gilles Vandecaveye (BEL); Louis Vandecaveye (BEL)
Sveti Vlas Future; Sveti Vlas, Bulgaria; US$5,000; 6–8 June 2025	Laurenc Grössig (AUT); Mathias Seiser (AUT); 21–14, 21–10	Đorđe Klašnić (SRB); Marko Makarić (SRB)	Dimitar Mehandzhiyski (BUL); Dimitar Kalchev (BUL); 23–21, 17–21, 15–12	Tiziano Andreatta (ITA); Davide Benzi (ITA)
Alanya Challenge; Alanya, Turkey; US$75,000; 12–15 June 2025	Ondřej Perušič (CZE); David Schweiner (CZE); 21–13, 23–21	Téo Rotar (FRA); Arnaud Gauthier-Rat (FRA)	George Wanderley (BRA); Saymon Santos (BRA); 21–16, 21–19	Mark Nicolaidis (AUS); Izac Carracher (AUS)
Jūrmala Future; Jūrmala, Latvia; US$5,000; 12–15 June 2025	Mārtiņš Pļaviņš (LAT); Kristians Fokerots (LAT); 25–23, 21–19	Aleksandrs Samoilovs (LAT); Gustavs Auziņš (LAT)	Audrius Knašas (LIT); Povilas Piešina (LIT); 21–11, 21–9	Arnas Rumševičius (LIT); Karolis Palubinskas (LIT)
Malmö Future; Malmö, Sweden; US$5,000; 13–15 June 2025	Jacob Hölting Nilsson (SWE); Elmer Andersson (SWE); 21–14, 21–17	Momme Lorenz (GER); Tilo Rietschel (GER)	Álvaro Viera (ESP); Antonio Saucedo (ESP) w/o	David Åhman (SWE); Jonatan Hellvig (SWE)
Qingdao Future; Qingdao, China; US$5,000; 13–15 June 2025	Mateus Rodrigues (BRA); Vilsomar Brito (BRA); 19–21, 21–15, 17–15	Bintang Akbar (INA); Sofyan Rachman (INA)	Wang Yanwei (CHN); Du Hongjun (CHN); 21–16, 19–21, 15–12	Garang Anyang (AUS); Justin Schumann (AUS)
Geneva Future; Geneva, Switzerland; US$5,000; 20–22 June 2025	Yves Haussener (SUI); Julian Friedli (SUI); 20–22, 21–16, 15–11	Florian Breer (SUI); Luc Flückiger (SUI)	Adrian Heidrich (SUI); Jonathan Jordan (SUI); 29–27, 21–15	Nils Ringøen (NOR); Even Stray Aas (NOR)
Ios Island Future; Ios, Greece; US$5,000; 20–22 June 2025	Gilles Vandecaveye (BEL); Louis Vandecaveye (BEL); 21–16, 23–21	Daniel Moreno (ESP); Roberto Sanfélix (ESP)	Robin Seidl (AUT); Alexander Huber (AUT); 21–16, 21–15	Niklas Held (GER); Hennes Nissen (GER)
Messina Future; Messina, Italy; US$5,000; 20–22 June 2025	Alex Ranghieri (ITA); Tobia Marchetto (ITA); 21–18, 18–21, 15–13	Samuele Cottafava (ITA); Gianluca Dal Corso (ITA)	Mads Møllgaard (DEN); Nicolai Overgaard (DEN); 21–17, 23–21	Jannis Hopt (GER); Simon Pfretzschner (GER)
Qidong Future; Qidong, China; US$5,000; 20–22 June 2025	Kyan Vercauteren (BEL); Joppe van Langendonck (BEL); 21–16, 18–21, 15–6	Mateus Rodrigues (BRA); Vilsomar Brito (BRA)	Frederick Bialokoz (ENG); Issa Batrane (ENG); 21–18, 21–15	Bintang Akbar (INA); Sofyan Rachman (INA)
Warmia–Mazury Challenge; Stare Jabłonki, Poland; US$75,000; 26–29 June 2025	Marco Krattiger (SUI); Leo Dillier (SUI); 25–23, 16–21, 16–14	Bartosz Łosiak (POL); Michał Bryl (POL)	Paul Henning (GER); Lui Wüst (GER) w/o	David Åhman (SWE); Jonatan Hellvig (SWE)
Gstaad Elite 16; Gstaad, Switzerland; US$150,000; 2–6 July 2025	Cherif Younousse (QAT); Ahmed Tijan (QAT); 21–19, 22–20	Jacob Hölting Nilsson (SWE); Elmer Andersson (SWE)	Stefan Boermans (NED); Yorick de Groot (NED); 21–23, 21–17, 15–10	George Wanderley (BRA); André Stein (BRA)
Montpellier Future; Montpellier, France; US$5,000; 4–6 July 2025	Elouan Chouikh-Barbez (FRA); Joadel Gardoque (FRA); 16–21, 22–20, 15–12	Robin Seidl (AUT); Alexander Huber (AUT)	Álvaro Viera (ESP); Antonio Saucedo (ESP); 21–16, 21–13	Felix Friedl (AUT); Florian Schnetzer (AUT)
Leuven Future; Leuven, Belgium; US$5,000; 19–21 July 2025	Louis Vandecaveye (BEL); Gilles Vandecaveye (BEL); 19–21, 21–16, 15–12	Kyan Vercauteren (BEL); Joppe van Langendonck (BEL)	Piotr Kantor (POL); Artem Besarab (POL); 21–17, 23–21	Adam Waber (CZE); Matyáš Ježek (CZE)
Baden Challenge; Baden bei Wien, Austria; US$75,000; 7–10 August 2025	Jacob Hölting Nilsson (SWE); Elmer Andersson (SWE); 21–18, 21–16	Nils Ehlers (GER); Clemens Wickler (GER)	Rémi Bassereau (FRA); Calvin Ayé (FRA); 16–21, 21–17, 15–10	Miles Evans (USA); Chase Budinger (USA)
Montreal Elite 16; Montreal, Canada; US$150,000; 14–17 August 2025	Anders Mol (NOR); Christian Sørum (NOR); 21–19, 21–13	Jacob Hölting Nilsson (SWE); Elmer Andersson (SWE)	Ondřej Perušič (CZE); David Schweiner (CZE); 14–21, 22–20, 20–18	David Åhman (SWE); Jonatan Hellvig (SWE)
Bujumbura Future; Bujumbura, Burundi; US$5,000; 21–23 August 2025	Gabriel Zuliani (BRA); Nicolas Capretti (BRA); 21–15, 21–14	Artúr Hajós (HUN); Bence Stréli (HUN)	James Drost (USA); Wyatt Harrison (USA); 21–15, 21–12	Takumi Takahashi (JPN); Jumpei Ikeda (JPN)
Brno Future; Brno, Czech Republic; US$5,000; 22–24 August 2025	Jakub Šépka (CZE); Jiří Sedlák (CZE); 21–13, 21–16	Adam Waber (CZE); Matyáš Ježek (CZE)	Florian Breer (SUI); Luc Flückiger (SUI); 21–19, 18–21, 15–13	Luboš Němec (SVK); Adrián Petruf (SVK)
Hamburg Elite 16; Hamburg, Germany; US$150,000; 27–31 August 2025	Anders Mol (NOR); Christian Sørum (NOR); 25–23, 21–14	Bartosz Łosiak (POL); Michał Bryl (POL)	Stefan Boermans (NED); Yorick de Groot (NED); 21–16, 21–10	Mārtiņš Pļaviņš (LAT); Kristians Fokerots (LAT)
Budapest Future; Budapest, Hungary; US$5,000; 5–7 September 2025	Nils Ringøen (NOR); Even Stray Aas (NOR); 21–18, 19–21, 16–14	Tom Sonneville (NED); Quinten Groenewold (NED)	Artúr Hajós (HUN); Bence Stréli (HUN) w/o	Yannick Verberne (NED); Leon Luini (NED)
Warsaw Future; Warsaw, Poland; US$5,000; 5–7 September 2025	Arnas Rumševičius (LTU); Karolis Palubinskas (LTU) w/o	Anton Moiseiev (UKR); Vitalii Savvin (UKR)	Mart Tiisaar (EST); Dimitriy Korotkov (EST); 21–19, 20–22, 15–13	Kryštof Jan Oliva (CZE); Václav Kůrka (CZE)
João Pessoa Elite 16; João Pessoa, Brazil; US$150,000; 17–21 September 2025	Evandro Oliveira (BRA); Arthur Lanci (BRA); 21–15, 27–25	Rémi Bassereau (FRA); Calvin Ayé (FRA)	Stefan Boermans (NED); Yorick de Groot (NED); 21–16, 21–13	Steven van de Velde (NED); Alexander Brouwer (NED)
Rio de Janeiro Elite 16; Rio de Janeiro, Brazil; US$150,000; 24–28 September 2025	Cherif Younousse (QAT); Ahmed Tijan (QAT); 21–14, 17–21, 18–16	Jorge Alayo (CUB); Noslen Díaz (CUB)	Stefan Boermans (NED); Yorick de Groot (NED); 17–21, 21–17, 15–11	Mārtiņš Pļaviņš (LAT); Kristians Fokerots (LAT)
Balıkesir Future; Balıkesir, Turkey; US$5,000; 26–28 September 2025	Yusuf Özdemir (TUR); Batuhan Kuru (TUR); 17–21, 21–14, 16–14	Ardis Bedrītis (LAT); Arturs Rinkēvičs (LAT)	Oleksii Bublyk (UKR); Ivan Datsiuk (UKR); 21–18, 21–9	Olivers Bulgačs (LAT); Markuss Graudiņš (LAT)
Veracruz Challenge; Veracruz, Mexico; US$75,000; 2–5 October 2025	George Wanderley (BRA); Saymon Santos (BRA); 21–16, 21–17	Chase Budinger (USA); Miles Evans (USA)	Yves Haussener (SUI); Julian Friedli (SUI); 23–21, 21–17	Samuele Cottafava (ITA); Gianluca Dal Corso (ITA)
Newport Beach Elite 16; Newport Beach, United States; US$150,000; 8–11 October 2025	Cherif Younousse (QAT); Ahmed Tijan (QAT); 21–16, 30–28	Evandro Oliveira (BRA); Arthur Lanci (BRA)	Marco Grimalt (CHI); Esteban Grimalt (CHI); 21–16, 21–18	Trevor Crabb (USA); Taylor Crabb (USA)
Nuvali Challenge; Santa Rosa, Philippines; US$75,000; 16–19 October 2025	Alejandro Huerta (ESP); Adrián Gavira (ESP); 21–17, 19–21, 17–15	Javier Bello (ENG); Joaquin Bello (ENG)	Manuel Alfieri (ITA); Alex Ranghieri (ITA); 17–21, 21–18, 15–12	Christoph Dressler (AUT); Philipp Waller (AUT)
Cape Town Elite 16; Cape Town, South Africa; US$150,000; 22–26 October 2025	Jacob Hölting Nilsson (SWE); Elmer Andersson (SWE); 21–15, 21–18	Tim Berger (AUT); Timo Hammarberg (AUT)	Hendrik Mol (NOR); Mathias Berntsen (NOR); 21–18, 14–21, 15–8	Rémi Bassereau (FRA); Calvin Ayé (FRA)
Itapema Elite 16; Itapema, Brazil; US$150,000; 3–7 December 2025	Elouan Chouikh-Barbez (FRA); Joadel Gardoque (FRA); 21–13, 21–19	Mārtiņš Pļaviņš (LAT); Kristians Fokerots (LAT)	Evandro Oliveira (BRA); Arthur Lanci (BRA); 21–18, 21–17	André Stein (BRA); Renato Carvalho (BRA)
Pompano Beach Future; Pompano Beach, United States; US$5,000; 5–7 December 2025	Miles Partain (USA); Travis Mewhirter (USA); 21–15, 22–20	Tristan Fröbel (GER); Tamo Wüst (GER)	Gustavs Auziņš (LAT); Ernests Puškundzis (LAT); 22–20, 18–21, 15–12	Aleksander Czachorowski (POL); Michał Korycki (POL)
Laginha Beach Future; Mindelo, Cape Verde; US$5,000; 12–14 December 2025	Ardis Bedrītis (LAT); Arturs Rinkēvičs (LAT); 21–13, 21–12	Dmytro Kozii (UKR); Vitalii Savvin (UKR)	Ivan Likhatskyi (UKR); Richard Likhatskyi (UKR); 21–17, 21–17	Jan Dumek (CZE); David Westphal (CZE)

=== Women ===
Tournament	Champions	Runners-up	Third place	Fourth place
Mount Maunganui Future; Mount Maunganui, New Zealand; US$5,000; 7–9 March 2025	Jaden Whitmarsh (USA); Devon Newberry (USA); 10–21, 21–18, 16–14	Kamila Tan (USA); Samantha Parrish (USA)	Alaina Chacon (USA); Morgan Chacon (USA); 21–16, 19–21, 18–16	Macy Jerger (USA); Megan Rice (USA)
Yucatán Challenge; Puerto Progreso, Mexico; US$75,000; 20–23 March 2025	Valentina Gottardi (ITA); Claudia Scampoli (ITA); 21–17, 21–15	Tanja Hüberli (SUI); Leona Kernen (SUI)	Devon Newberry (USA); Jaden Whitmarsh (USA); 17–21, 21–15, 20–18	Kimberly Hildreth (USA); Teegan Van Gunst (USA)
Quintana Roo Elite 16; Playa del Carmen, Mexico; US$150,000; 27–30 March 2025	Carolina Solberg Salgado (BRA); Rebecca Cavalcante (BRA); 21–13, 21–17	Terese Cannon (USA); Megan Kraft (USA)	Kristen Nuss (USA); Taryn Brasher (USA); 21–16, 21–14	Molly Shaw (USA); Kelly Cheng (USA)
Coolangatta Future; Coolangatta, Australia; US$5,000; 27–30 March 2025	Alaina Chacon (USA); Morgan Chacon (USA); 21–6, 21–16	Kirsty Star (ENG); Daisy Mumby (ENG)	Elizabeth Alchin (AUS); Georgia Johnson (AUS); 21–15, 21–17	Maho Yabumi (JPN); Mayu Kikuchi (JPN)
Songkhla Future; Songkhla, Thailand; US$5,000; 9–11 April 2025	Alaina Chacon (USA); Morgan Chacon (USA); 21–19, 19–21, 20–18	Ren Matsumoto (JPN); Non Matsumoto (JPN)	Yu Tong (CHN); Jiang Kaiyue (CHN); 24–22, 22–24, 15–8	Salinda Mungkhon (THA); Samitta Simarongnam (THA)
Saquarema Elite 16; Saquarema, Brazil; US$150,000; 10–13 April 2025	Thamela Galil (BRA); Victória Lopes (BRA); 21–19, 16–21, 15–10	Kristen Nuss (USA); Taryn Brasher (USA)	Svenja Müller (GER); Cinja Tillmann (GER); 21–16, 21–16	Kelly Cheng (USA); Molly Shaw (USA)
Brasília Elite 16; Brasília, Brazil; US$150,000; 17–20 April 2025	Kristen Nuss (USA); Taryn Brasher (USA); 22–20, 21–19	Carolina Solberg Salgado (BRA); Rebecca Cavalcante (BRA)	Ana Patrícia (BRA); Duda Lisboa (BRA); 19–21, 21–15, 15–12	Emi van Driel (NED); Wies Bekhuis (NED)
Valencia Future; Valencia, Spain; US$5,000; 1–3 May 2025	Saofé Duval (FRA); Anouk Dupin (FRA); 21–17, 15–21, 20–18	María Belén Carro (ESP); Paula Soria (ESP)	Yeva Serdiuk (UKR); Daria Romaniuk (UKR); 21–14, 21–16	Elsa Descamps (FRA); Romane Sobezalz (FRA)
Nuvali Future; Santa Rosa, Philippines; US$5,000; 2–4 May 2025	Shaunna Polley (NZL); Olivia MacDonald (NZL); 21–18, 21–14	Sakura Ito (JPN); Mayu Sawame (JPN)	Ieva Dumbauskaitė (LIT); Gerda Grudzinskaitė (LIT); 21–19, 19–21, 19–17	Beata Vaida (ROM); Francesca Alupei (ROM)
Cervia Future; Cervia, Italy; US$5,000; 9–11 May 2025	Hanna-Marie Schieder (GER); Karla Borger (GER); 24–22, 15–21, 15–11	Katerina Pavelková (CZE); Anna Pavelková (CZE)	Živa Javornik (SLO); Tajda Lovšin (SLO); 21–18, 19–21, 16–14	Stefánia Kun (HUN); Lilla Villám (HUN)
Xiamen Challenge; Xiamen, China; US$75,000; 15–18 May 2025	Toni Rodriguez (USA); Kylie Kuyava-DeBerg (USA); 13–21, 21–13, 15–9	Niina Ahtiainen (FIN); Taru Lahti-Liukkonen (FIN)	Lea Kunst (GER); Melanie Paul (GER); 21–18, 21–15	Savannah Simo (USA); Abby Van Winkle (USA)
Madrid Future; Madrid, Spain; US$5,000; 16–18 May 2025	Janne Uhl (GER); Paula Schürholz (GER); 21–13, 18–21, 20–18	Alex Merle (FRA); Anouk Dupin (FRA)	Tjaša Kotnik (SLO); Maja Marolt (SLO) w/o	Daniela Álvarez (ESP); Tania Moreno (ESP)
Spiez Future; Spiez, Switzerland; US$5,000; 22–24 May 2025	Tanja Hüberli (SUI); Leona Kernen (SUI); 21–15, 21–15	Anouk Vergé-Dépré (SUI); Zoé Vergé-Dépré (SUI)	Hanna-Marie Schieder (GER); Karla Borger (GER); 21–19, 21–12	Valerie Dvorníková (CZE); Karin Žolnerčíková (CZE)
Wuhan Qingshan Future; Wuhan, China; US$5,000; 23–25 May 2025	Liisa Remmelg (EST); Heleene Hollas (EST); 21–12, 18–21, 15–9	Tanarattha Udomchavee (THA); Rumpaipruet Numwong (THA)	Majabelle Lawac (VAN); Sherysyn Toko (VAN); 21–15, 7–21, 15–10	Lin Meimei (CHN); Xie Hong (CHN)
Ostrava Elite 16; Ostrava, Czech Republic; US$150,000; 28 May–1 June 2025	Thamela Galil (BRA); Victória Lopes (BRA); 21–16, 21–11	Tīna Graudiņa (LAT); Anastasija Samoilova (LAT)	Anouk Vergé-Dépré (SUI); Zoé Vergé-Dépré (SUI); 21–18, 16–21, 15–12	Dorina Klinger (AUT); Ronja Klinger (AUT)
Battipaglia Future; Battipaglia, Italy; US$5,000; 30 May–1 June 2025	Trijntje Veerbeek (NED); Floor Hogenhout (NED); 22–20, 21–15	Ieva Dumbauskaitė (LTU); Gerda Grudzinskaitė (LTU)	Anouk Dupin (FRA); Marine Kinna (FRA); 21–19, 21–18	Lisa Luini (NED); Desy Poiesz (NED)
Prague Future; Prague, Czech Republic; US$5,000; 6–8 June 2025	Katerina Pavelková (CZE); Anna Pavelková (CZE); 22–20, 17–21, 15–13	Marie-Sára Štochlová (CZE); Markéta Svozilová (CZE)	Martina Maixnerová (CZE); Kylie Neuschaeferová (CZE); 19–21, 21–12, 15–8	Marta Łodej (POL); Julia Kielak (POL)
Sveti Vlas Future; Sveti Vlas, Bulgaria; US$5,000; 6–8 June 2025	Yeva Serdiuk (UKR); Daria Romaniuk (UKR); 21–12, 21–19	Valentyna Davidova (UKR); Anhelina Khmil (UKR)	Sofía Izuzquiza (ESP); Ana Vergara (ESP); 21–18, 18–21, 15–10	Sarah Schulz (GER); Josefine Schäkel (GER)
Alanya Challenge; Alanya, Turkey; US$75,000; 12–15 June 2025	Anouk Vergé-Dépré (SUI); Zoé Vergé-Dépré (SUI); 21–15, 12–21, 15–13	Valentina Gottardi (ITA); Reka Orsi Toth (ITA)	Clémence Vieira (FRA); Aline Chamereau (FRA); 21–10, 5–3^{rtd.}	Claudia Scampoli (ITA); Giada Bianchi (ITA)
Jūrmala Future; Jūrmala, Latvia; US$5,000; 12–15 June 2025	Anouk Dupin (FRA); Marine Kinna (FRA); 21–18, 16–21, 15–9	Eva Liisa Kuivonen (EST); Liisa-Lotta Jürgenson (EST)	Liisa Remmelg (EST); Heleene Hollas (EST); 21–13, 21–16	Varvara Brailko (LAT); Anete Namiķe (LAT)
Kraków Future; Kraków, Poland; US$5,000; 13–15 June 2025	Inna Makhno (UKR); Iryna Makhno (UKR); 23–21, 20–22, 15–5	Frida Berntsen (NOR); Oda Løvø Steinsvåg (NOR)	Sofía Izuzquiza (ESP); Sofía González (ESP); 21–18, 21–19	Marta Łodej (POL); Julia Kielak (POL)
Qingdao Future; Qingdao, China; US$5,000; 13–15 June 2025	Cao Shuting (CHN); Dong Jie (CHN); 21–19, 21–14	Yuan Lvwen (CHN); Zhu Lingdi (CHN)	Aheidan Mushajiang (CHN); Kadeliye Halaiti (CHN); 27–25, 16–21, 15–13	Ren Matsumoto (JPN); Non Matsumoto (JPN)
Ios Island Future; Ios, Greece; US$5,000; 20–22 June 2025	Inna Makhno (UKR); Iryna Makhno (UKR); 21–17, 19–21, 18–16	Elisavet Triantafillidi (GRE); Dimitra Manavi (GRE)	Saofé Duval (FRA); Marilu Pally (FRA); 21–16, 21–17	Sakura Ito (JPN); Mayu Sawame (JPN)
Messina Future; Messina, Italy; US$5,000; 20–22 June 2025	Martina Maixnerová (CZE); Kylie Neuschaeferová (CZE); 23–21, 21–19	Menia Bentele (SUI); Annique Niederhauser (SUI)	Katerina Pavelková (CZE); Anna Pavelková (CZE); 21–14, 21–16	Lucie Knoblochová (CZE); Adéla Petříková (CZE)
Qidong Future; Qidong, China; US$5,000; 20–22 June 2025	Ren Matsumoto (JPN); Non Matsumoto (JPN); 21–19, 26–28, 15–13	Stefánia Kun (HUN); Lilla Villám (HUN)	Quemile Vieira (BRA); Emanuely Pereira (BRA); 21–16, 17–21, 16–14	Caitlin Bettenay (AUS); Cassandra Dodd (AUS)
Warmia–Mazury Challenge; Stare Jabłonki, Poland; US$75,000; 26–29 June 2025	Maryna Hladun (UKR); Tetiana Lazarenko (UKR); 19–21, 21–14, 15–11	Linda Bock (GER); Louisa Lippmann (GER)	Clémence Vieira (FRA); Aline Chamereau (FRA); 21–18, 21–18	Julia Donlin (USA); Lexy Denaburg (USA)
Geneva Future; Geneva, Switzerland; US$5,000; 27–29 June 2025	Alexis Durish (USA); Audrey Koenig (USA); 21–16, 24–26, 15–5	Ieva Dumbauskaitė (LIT); Gerda Grudzinskaitė (LIT)	Elsa Descamps (FRA); Romane Sobezalz (FRA); 21–12, 21–16	Kaylee Glagau (CAN); Emma Glagau (CAN)
Gstaad Elite 16; Gstaad, Switzerland; US$150,000; 2–6 July 2025	Kristen Nuss (USA); Taryn Brasher (USA); 21–19, 21–18	Tīna Graudiņa (LAT); Anastasija Samoilova (LAT)	Anouk Vergé-Dépré (SUI); Zoé Vergé-Dépré (SUI); 21–17, 21–11	Tanja Hüberli (SUI); Leona Kernen (SUI)
Montpellier Future; Montpellier, France; US$5,000; 4–6 July 2025	Sofía Izuzquiza (ESP); Sofía González (ESP); 21–17, 14–21, 15–9	Elsa Descamps (FRA); Anouk Dupin (FRA)	Alexis Durish (USA); Audrey Koenig (USA); 21–16, 21–14	Martina Maixnerová (CZE); Kylie Neuschaeferová (CZE)
Leuven Future; Leuven, Belgium; US$5,000; 19–21 July 2025	Lia Berger (AUT); Lilli Hohenauer (AUT); 21–17, 21–19	Youna Coens (BEL); Sarah Cools (BEL)	Lisa Luini (NED); Desy Poiesz (NED); 21–15, 21–18	Britt Ruysschaert (BEL); Isabel Van den Broe (BEL)
Baden Challenge; Baden bei Wien, Austria; US$75,000; 6–9 August 2025	Linda Bock (GER); Louisa Lippmann (GER); 22–20, 21–9	Mila Konink (NED); Raïsa Schoon (NED)	Valentyna Davidova (UKR); Anhelina Khmil (UKR); 21–18, 21–16	Niina Ahtiainen (FIN); Taru Lahti-Liukkonen (FIN)
Montreal Elite 16; Montreal, Canada; US$150,000; 14–17 August 2025	Melissa Humana-Paredes (CAN); Brandie Wilkerson (CAN); 21–15, 22–20	Svenja Müller (GER); Cinja Tillmann (GER)	Ana Patrícia (BRA); Duda Lisboa (BRA); 21–14, 21–16	Tīna Graudiņa (LAT); Anastasija Samoilova (LAT)
Busan–Suyeong Future; Busan, South Korea; US$5,000; 15–17 August 2025	Ren Matsumoto (JPN); Non Matsumoto (JPN); 17–21, 21–9, 15–11	Nina Pavlova (NOR); Sunniva Helland-Hansen (NOR)	Anna Pospíšilová (CZE); Daniela Mokrá (CZE); 21–16, 18–21, 16–14	Majabelle Lawac (VAN); Sherysyn Toko (VAN)
Bujumbura Future; Bujumbura, Burundi; US$5,000; 21–23 August 2025	Sandra Ferger (GER); Rika Dieckmann (GER); 10–21, 21–17, 15–12	Tajda Lovšin (SLO); Živa Javornik (SLO)	Jade Race (USA); Katie Lindstrom (USA); 25–27, 21–12, 16–14	Mahassine Siad (MAR); Dina Mellal (MAR)
Brno Future; Brno, Czech Republic; US$5,000; 22–24 August 2025	Valerie Dvorníková (CZE); Michaela Břínková (CZE); 27–29, 21–12, 15–12	Elsa Descamps (FRA); Anouk Dupin (FRA)	Heleene Hollas (EST); Liisa Remmelg (EST); 21–16, 21–19	Anna Pospíšilová (CZE); Daniela Mokrá (CZE)
Hamburg Elite 16; Hamburg, Germany; US$150,000; 27–31 August 2025	Valentina Gottardi (ITA); Reka Orsi Toth (ITA); 17–21, 21–18, 15–6	Thamela Galil (BRA); Victória Lopes (BRA)	Ana Patrícia (BRA); Duda Lisboa (BRA); 21–16, 21–18	Svenja Müller (GER); Cinja Tillmann (GER)
Budapest Future; Budapest, Hungary; US$5,000; 5–7 September 2025	Veronika Kleiblová (CZE); Andrea Lorenzová (CZE); 21–14, 21–17	Ieva Dumbauskaitė (LIT); Gerda Grudzinskaitė (LIT)	Ana Vergara (ESP); Nazaret Florián (ESP); 21–15, 21–12	Elisavet Triantafillidi (GRE); Dimitra Manavi (GRE)
Warsaw Future; Warsaw, Poland; US$5,000; 12–14 September 2025	Ariana Rudkovskaja (LIT); Skalvė Križanauskaitė (LIT); 15–21, 26–24, 15–10	Ieva Vasiliauskaitė (LIT); Erika Kliokmanaitė (LIT)	Francesca Alupei (ROM); Beata Vaida (ROM); 15–21, 21–16, 15–11	Stefánia Kun (HUN); Lilla Villám (HUN)
João Pessoa Elite 16; João Pessoa, Brazil; US$150,000; 17–21 September 2025	Molly Shaw (USA); Kelly Cheng (USA); 21–16, 21–17	Terese Cannon (USA); Megan Kraft (USA)	Ana Patrícia (BRA); Duda Lisboa (BRA); 21–16, 21–13	Carolina Solberg Salgado (BRA); Rebecca Cavalcante (BRA)
Bondues Lille Métropole Future; Bondues, France; US$5,000; 19–21 September 2025	Lisa Luini (NED); Desy Poiesz (NED); 21–8, 21–14	Romane Sobezalz (FRA); Saofé Duval (FRA)	Ophélie Lusson (FRA); Alex Merle (FRA); 15–21, 21–17, 15–11	Sophia Neuß (GER); Mareet Maidhof (GER)
Rio de Janeiro Elite 16; Rio de Janeiro, Brazil; US$150,000; 24–28 September 2025	Carolina Solberg Salgado (BRA); Rebecca Cavalcante (BRA); 18–21, 21–18, 15–11	Thamela Galil (BRA); Victória Lopes (BRA)	Terese Cannon (USA); Megan Kraft (USA); 21–13, 24–22	Molly Shaw (USA); Kelly Cheng (USA)
Balıkesir Future; Balıkesir, Turkey; US$5,000; 26–28 September 2025	Stefánia Kun (HUN); Lilla Villám (HUN); 21–18, 21–18	Anna Pospíšilová (CZE); Michaela Břínková (CZE)	Sara Sinisalo (FIN); Anniina Muukka (FIN); 21–19, 27–25	Sophia Neuß (GER); Mareet Maidhof (GER)
Veracruz Challenge; Veracruz, Mexico; US$75,000; 2–5 October 2025	Katja Stam (NED); Raïsa Schoon (NED); 21–16, 21–14	Corinne Quiggle (USA); Chloe Loreen (USA)	María Claudia González (PUR); Allanis Navas (PUR); 21–15, 21–17	Shaunna Polley (NZL); Olivia MacDonald (NZL)
Newport Beach Elite 16; Newport Beach, United States; US$150,000; 8–11 October 2025	Kristen Nuss (USA); Taryn Brasher (USA); 21–15, 21–14	Julia Donlin (USA); Lexy Denaburg (USA)	Ana Patrícia (BRA); Duda Lisboa (BRA); 21–11, 21–12	Terese Cannon (USA); Megan Kraft (USA)
Nuvali Challenge; Santa Rosa, Philippines; US$75,000; 16–19 October 2025	Anniina Parkkinen (FIN); Vilhelmiina Prihti (FIN); 17–21, 21–14, 15–11	Ieva Dumbauskaitė (LTU); Gerda Grudzinskaitė (LTU)	Jasmine Fleming (AUS); Stefanie Fejes (AUS); 13–21, 21–15, 15–13	Kylie Neuschaeferová (CZE); Martina Maixnerová (CZE)
Cape Town Elite 16; Cape Town, South Africa; US$150,000; 22–26 October 2025	Svenja Müller (GER); Cinja Tillmann (GER); 21–17, 25–23	Katja Stam (NED); Raïsa Schoon (NED)	Sandra Ittlinger (GER); Anna-Lena Grüne (GER); 17–21, 21–15, 15–9	Tīna Graudiņa (LAT); Anastasija Samoilova (LAT)
Itapema Elite 16; Itapema, Brazil; US$150,000; 3–7 December 2025	Carolina Solberg Salgado (BRA); Rebecca Cavalcante (BRA); 21–10, 21–10	Taiana Lima (BRA); Talita Antunes (BRA)	Thamela Galil (BRA); Victória Lopes (BRA); 21–16, 21–8	Thainara Oliveira (BRA); Talita Simonetti (BRA)
Pompano Beach Future; Pompano Beach, United States; US$5,000; 5–7 December 2025	Kamila Tan (USA); Natalie Myszkowski (USA); 21–17, 18–21, 15–10	Nazaret Florián (ESP); Adriana Serrano (ESP)	Maya Gessner (USA); Carly Kan (USA); 21–15, 21–15	Maya McNabney (CAN); Emma Kunaus (CAN)
Laginha Beach Future; Mindelo, Cape Verde; US$5,000; 12–14 December 2025	Ieva Vasiliauskaitė (LTU); Erika Kliokmanaitė (LTU); 21–14, 21–18	Rika Dieckmann (GER); Sophia Neuß (GER)	Ophélie Lusson (FRA); Alex Merle (FRA); 21–19, 21–15	Riko Tsujimura (JPN); Takemi Nishibori (JPN)

== Medal table by country ==
Rank	Nation	Gold	Silver	Bronze	Total
1	United States	11	7	10	28
2	Brazil	9	7	9	25
3	Czech Republic	8	5	7	20
4	Germany	5	8	5	18
5	Switzerland	5	7	6	18
6	Italy	5	4	1	10
7	Netherlands	5	3	6	14
8	France	4	6	9	19
9	Norway	4	4	2	10
10	Ukraine	4	3	4	11
11	Sweden	4	3	0	7
12	Qatar	4	0	0	4
13	Lithuania	3	5	2	10
14	Spain	3	3	6	12
15	Belgium	3	2	0	5
16	New Zealand	3	1	0	4
17	Latvia	2	5	2	9
18	Austria	2	3	2	7
19	Japan	2	2	0	4
20	Israel	2	1	0	3
21	Slovakia	2	0	0	2
22	Hungary	1	2	1	4
23	China	1	1	4	6
24	Estonia	1	1	3	5
25	Finland	1	1	1	3
26	Cuba	1	1	0	2
27	Canada	1	0	0	1
27	Turkey	1	0	0	1
29	England	0	3	1	4
29	Poland	0	3	1	4
31	Slovenia	0	1	2	3
32	Thailand	0	1	1	2
33	Argentina	0	1	0	1
33	Greece	0	1	0	1
33	Indonesia	0	1	0	1
33	Serbia	0	1	0	1
37	Australia	0	0	3	3
37	Denmark	0	0	3	3
39	Bulgaria	0	0	1	1
39	Chile	0	0	1	1
39	Portugal	0	0	1	1
39	Puerto Rico	0	0	1	1
39	Romania	0	0	1	1
39	Vanuatu	0	0	1	1
Totals (44 entries)		97	97	97	291
