= 2026 Volleyball World Beach Pro Tour =

International beach volleyball competition

Tournament details
- Host country: Various
- Dates: 4 March – October 2026

The 2026 Volleyball World Beach Pro Tour is the fifth edition of the global elite professional beach volleyball circuit organized by the Fédération Internationale de Volleyball (FIVB) for the 2026 beach volleyball season. Since March 2022, the Tour comprises three tiers: Future, Challenge and Elite 16. The season ends with The Finals featuring the 10 best teams in the world.

The Volleyball World Beach Pro Tour was established by FIVB in October 2021, thus it replaced the former Volleyball World Beach Pro Tour.

== Schedule ==
Key

World Championships
Beach Pro Tour Finals
Elite 16
Challenge
Future

=== Men ===
Tournament	Champions	Runners-up	Third place	Fourth place
Bhubaneswar Challenge; Bhubaneswar, India; US$75,000; 5–8 March 2026	Kyan Vercauteren (BEL); Joppe van Langendonck (BEL); 21–10, 22–20	Jakub Šépka (CZE); Matyas Džavoronok (CZE)	Eylon Elazar (ISR); Kevin Cuzmiciov (ISR); 21–19, 21–8	Jacob Brinck (DEN); Nicolai Overgaard (DEN)
Sanya Future; Sanya, China; US$5,000; 6–8 March 2026	Niklas Held (GER); Luis Kubo (GER); 21–19, 16–21, 15–11	Theodor Grahn (SWE); Linus Isaksson (SWE)	Aleksander Czachorowski (POL); Jakub Krzemiński (POL); 21–18, 21–16	Szymon Beta (POL); Artem Besarab (POL)
João Pessoa Elite 16; João Pessoa, Brazil; US$150,000; 11–15 March 2026	David Åhman (SWE); Jonatan Hellvig (SWE); 21–16, 21–18	Rémi Bassereau (FRA); Calvin Ayé (FRA)	Taylor Crabb (USA); Andrew Benesh (USA) w/o	Evandro Oliveira (BRA); Arthur Lanci (BRA)
Coolangatta Future; Coolangatta, Australia; US$5,000; 12–15 March 2026	Jack Pearse (AUS); D'Artagnan Potts (AUS); 21–17, 21–17	Pithak Tipjan (THA); Wachirawit Muadpha (THA)	Solomon Bushby (AUS); Justin Schumann (AUS); 17–21, 26–24, 15–9	Joshua Howat (AUS); Luke Ryan (AUS)
Haikou Future; Haikou, China; US$5,000; 13–15 March 2026	Wu Jiaxin (CHN); Wang Yanwei (CHN); 25–23, 22–20	Yusuf Özdemir (TUR); Batuhan Kuru (TUR)	Niklas Held (GER); Luis Kubo (GER); 21–17, 21–19	Jonathan Bungert (GER); Filo Wüst (GER)
Tlaxcala Challenge; Tlaxcala, Mexico; US$75,000; 19–22 March 2026	D'Artagnan Potts (AUS); Jack Pearse (AUS); 21–16, 21–19	Nicolás Capogrosso (ARG); Tomás Capogrosso (ARG)	Timothy Brewster (USA); Logan Webber (USA); 20–22, 21–19, 15–11	Mark Nicolaidis (AUS); Izac Carracher (AUS)
Rarotonga Future; Avarua, Cook Islands; US$5,000; 25–27 March 2026	Domonkos Dóczi (HUN); Ákos Veress (HUN); 21–6, 21–15	Charles Siragusa (USA); Alex Ukkelberg (USA)	Steven Abrams (CAN); Cameron Chadwick (CAN); 26–24, 21–14	Finley Bennett (AUS); James Kay (AUS)
Nayarit Challenge; Nuevo Nayarit, Mexico; US$75,000; 26–29 March 2026	Samuele Cottafava (ITA); Gianluca Dal Corso (ITA); 21–17, 21–17	Leon Luini (NED); Matthew Immers (NED)	Eylon Elazar (ISR); Kevin Cuzmiciov (ISR); 21–15, 21–15	Nicolás Capogrosso (ARG); Tomás Capogrosso (ARG)
Tahiti Future; Papeete, French Polynesia; US$5,000; 31 Mar.–2 Apr. 2026	Gage Basey (USA); Thomas Hurst (USA); 21–12, 21–18	Bence Tari (HUN); Lukas Niemeier (HUN)	Domonkos Dóczi (HUN); Ákos Veress (HUN); 21–12, 22–20	Harley Sinclair (AUS); Jett Rocker-Graham (AUS)
Saquarema Elite 16; Saquarema, Brazil; US$150,000; 8–12 April 2026	Anders Mol (NOR); Christian Sørum (NOR); 21–16, 23–21	Jacob Hölting Nilsson (SWE); Elmer Andersson (SWE)	Mārtiņš Pļaviņš (LAT); Kristians Fokerots (LAT); 21–16, 17–21, 15–13	Rémi Bassereau (FRA); Calvin Ayé (FRA)
Brasília Elite 16; Brasília, Brazil; US$150,000; 29 Apr.–3 May 2026	Jacob Hölting Nilsson (SWE); Elmer Andersson (SWE); 21–16, 21–15	Bartosz Łosiak (POL); Michał Bryl (POL)	Mārtiņš Pļaviņš (LAT); Kristians Fokerots (LAT); 21–19, 21–16	Téo Rotar (FRA); Arnaud Gauthier-Rat (FRA)
Madrid Future; Madrid, Spain; US$5,000; 8–10 May 2026	Edgars Točs (LAT); Gustavs Auziņš (LAT); 21–11, ^{rtd.}	Mart Tiisaar (EST); Dimitriy Korotkov (EST)	Tom Sonneville (NED); Quinten Groenewold (NED); 21–17, 21–17	Bence Tari (HUN); Lukas Niemeier (HUN)
Xiamen Challenge; Xiamen, China; US$75,000; 14–17 May 2026	Eylon Elazar (ISR); Kevin Cuzmiciov (ISR); 24–22, 21–15	D'Artagnan Potts (AUS); Jack Pearse (AUS)	Kyan Vercauteren (BEL); Joppe van Langendonck (BEL); 15–21, 21–19, 15–12	Nils Ringøen (NOR); Even Stray Aas (NOR)
Nuvali Challenge; Santa Rosa, Philippines; US$75,000; 21–24 May 2026	Thomas Hodges (AUS); Ben Hood (AUS); 14–21, 21–16, 15–8	Adrian Heidrich (SUI); Yves Haussener (SUI)	Julian Friedli (SUI); Jonathan Jordan (SUI); 18–21, 21–13, 15–13	Philipp Huster (GER); Sven Winter (GER)
Apeldoorn Future; Apeldoorn, Netherlands; US$5,000; 22–24 May 2026	Tom Sonneville (NED); Quinten Groenewold (NED); 21–19, 21–19	Mart Tiisaar (EST); Dimitriy Korotkov (EST)	Tristan Fröbel (GER); Tamo Wüst (GER); 21–16, 21–16	Syver Klungsøyr (NOR); Tobias Pedersen (NOR)
Ostrava Elite 16; Ostrava, Czech Republic; US$150,000; 27–31 May 2026	David Åhman (SWE); Jonatan Hellvig (SWE); 21–19, 21–14	Ondřej Perušič (CZE); Jiří Sedlák (CZE)	Taylor Crabb (USA); Andrew Benesh (USA) w/o	Cherif Younousse (QAT); Ahmed Tijan (QAT)
Wuhan Future; Wuhan, China; US$5,000; 29–31 May 2026	Sebastian Kjemperud (NOR); Jonah Kjemperud (NOR); 21–16, 22–20	Guo Sihong (CHN); Song Jinyang (CHN)	Wu Jiaxin (CHN); Zhou Chaowei (CHN); 21–13, 21–15	Oliver Merritt (AUS); Jed Walker (AUS)
Cervia Future; Cervia, Italy; US$5,000; 29–31 May 2026	Marco Viscovich (ITA); Davide Borraccino (ITA); 21–19, 21–16	Manuel Alfieri (ITA); Alex Ranghieri (ITA)	Domonkos Dóczi (HUN); Ákos Veress (HUN); 18–21, 22–20, 15–10	Bence Tari (HUN); Lukas Niemeier (HUN)
Kraków Future; Kraków, Poland; US$5,000; 5–7 June 2026	Ivan Datsiuk (UKR); Oleksii Bublyk (UKR); 21–16, 21–18	Jakub Krzemiński (POL); Aleksander Czachorowski (POL)	Piotr Janiak (POL); Jędrzej Brożyniak (POL); 22–20, 21–16	Audrius Knašas (LTU); Povilas Piešina (LTU)
Sveti Vlas Future; Sveti Vlas, Bulgaria; US$5,000; 5–7 June 2026	Bence Tari (HUN); Lukas Niemeier (HUN); 22–20, 15–21, 15–10	Marko Makarić (SRB); Đorđe Klašnić (SRB)	Ivan Likhatskyi (UKR); Richard Likhatskyi (UKR); 17–21, 21–16, 15–11	Dimitar Mehandzhiyski (BUL); Dimitar Kalchev (BUL)
Alanya Challenge; Alanya, Turkey; US$75,000; 11–14 June 2026	Paul Henning (GER); Lukas Pfretzschner (GER); 22–20, 24–22	Javier Bello (ENG); Joaquin Bello (ENG)	Samuele Cottafava (ITA); Gianluca Dal Corso (ITA); 21–16, 17–21, 15–10	Adelmo Folha (BRA); Mateus Dultra (BRA)
Jūrmala Future; Jūrmala, Latvia; US$5,000; 11–14 June 2026	Edgars Točs (LAT); Gustavs Auziņš (LAT); 21–15, 18–21, 15–12	Ardis Bedrītis (LAT); Arturs Rinkēvičs (LAT)	Ivan Datsiuk (UKR); Oleksii Bublyk (UKR); 21–18, 21–16	Marko Makarić (SRB); Đorđe Klašnić (SRB)
Ios Future; Chora, Greece; US$5,000; 19–21 June 2026	Sam van der Loo (NED); Mees Sengers (NED); 21–14, 21–19	Stavros Ntallas (GRE); Dimitrios Chatzinikolaou (GRE)	Charlie Peters (GER); Colin Paszkiewicz (GER); 21–13, 21–13	Jakub Krzemiński (POL); Aleksander Czachorowski (POL)
Karpacz Future; Karpacz, Poland; US$5,000; 19–21 June 2026	Daniel Moreno (ESP); Roberto Sanfélix (ESP); 21–17, 21–16	Mikołaj Kaczmarek (POL); Kacper Taudul (POL)	Tristan Fröbel (GER); Tamo Wüst (GER); 21–16, 15–21, 18–16	Wiktor Musiał (POL); Tomasz Warych (POL)
Balıkesir Future; Balıkesir, Turkey; US$5,000; 26–28 June 2026	Tobia Marchetto (ITA); Riccardo Iervolino (ITA); 21–16, 21–17	Yusuf Özdemir (TUR); Batuhan Kuru (TUR)	Sam van der Loo (NED); Mees Sengers (NED); 19–21, 22–20, 15–13	Dmytro Kozii (UKR); Sviatoslav Nahornyi (UKR)
Bridlington Future; Bridlington, England; US$5,000; 26–28 June 2026	Jakub Krzemiński (POL); Aleksander Czachorowski (POL); 21–19, 21–14	Juan Enrique Bello (ENG); Niko Gleed (ENG)	Frederick Bialokoz (ENG); Issa Batrane (ENG); 21–16, 22–20	Luke de Greeff (CAN); Tynan Gannett (CAN)
Geneva Future; Geneva, Switzerland; US$5,000; 26–28 June 2026	Gilles Vandecaveye (BEL); Louis Vandecaveye (BEL); 21–18, 21–12	Marco Ulisse (ITA); Giacomo Spadoni (ITA)	Tiziano Andreatta (ITA); Raoul Acerbi (ITA); 21–16, 24–22	Colin Hilbert (LUX); Steve Weber (LUX)
Hangzhou Future; Hangzhou, China; US$5,000; 26–28 June 2026	Netitorn Muneekul (THA); Poravid Taovato (THA); 22–20, 21–19	Abbas Pourasgari (IRI); Alireza Aghajani (IRI)	Wachirawit Muadpha (THA); Pithak Tipjan (THA); 21–15, 22–24, 15–13	Liu Yuan (CHN); Mao Yuan (CHN)
Gstaad Elite 16; Gstaad, Switzerland; US$150,000; 1–5 July 2026	Stefan Boermans (NED); Alexander Brouwer (NED); 26–28, 21–17, 15–11	Trevor Crabb (USA); Chase Budinger (USA)	Evandro Oliveira (BRA); Arthur Lanci (BRA); 22–20, 21–16	Philipp Waller (AUT); Moritz Pristauz (AUT)
Rzeszów Future; Rzeszów, Poland; US$5,000; 3–5 July 2026	Aleksander Czachorowski (POL); Jakub Krzemiński (POL); 21–19, 16–21, 18–16	Ivan Datsiuk (UKR); Oleksii Bublyk (UKR)	Alan Košenina (SLO); Črtomir Bošnjak (SLO); 26–24, 21–5	Martin Appelgren (SWE); Fabian Ramén (SWE)
Leuven Future; Leuven, Belgium; US$5,000; 10–12 July 2026	Gilles Vandecaveye (BEL); Louis Vandecaveye (BEL); 21–13, 13–21, 16–14	Kryštof Jan Oliva (CZE); Václav Kůrka (CZE)	Kyan Vercauteren (BEL); Joppe van Langendonck (BEL); 21–16, 15–21, 15–13	Olivers Bulgačs (LAT); Mārcis Bērziņš (LAT)
Malmö Future; Malmö, Sweden; US$5,000; 10–12 July 2026	Sam van der Loo (NED); Mees Sengers (NED); 21–17, 24–26, 15–13	Jacob Hölting Nilsson (SWE); Alfred Mjörnheim (SWE)	Sebastian Kjemperud (NOR); Jonah Kjemperud (NOR); 21–16, 10–4^{rtd.}	Theodor Grahn (SWE); Linus Isaksson (SWE)
Shangluo Challenge; Shangluo, China; US$75,000; 23–26 July 2026	Mark Nicolaidis (AUS); Izac Carracher (AUS); 19–21, 21–15, 16–14	Philipp Huster (GER); Sven Winter (GER)	Nils Ehlers (GER); Lui Wüst (GER); 21–17, 21–16	Jakub Šépka (CZE); Jiří Sedlák (CZE)
Laginha Beach Future; Mindelo, Cape Verde; US$5,000; 24–26 July 2026	Thijmen Heemskerk (NED); Calvin Ooms (NED); 12–21, 21–14, 15–13	Yannick Verberne (NED); Dirk Boehlé (NED)	Charlie Peters (GER); Colin Paszkiewicz (GER); 21–16, 21–14	Jacob Hejlsvig Petersen (DEN); Villads Napier (DEN)
Rio de Janeiro Elite 16; Rio de Janeiro, Brazil; US$150,000; 29 Jul.–2 Aug. 2026	Mārtiņš Pļaviņš (LAT); Kristians Fokerots (LAT); 21–17, 21–11	Rémi Bassereau (FRA); Calvin Ayé (FRA)	Téo Rotar (FRA); Arnaud Gauthier-Rat (FRA); 18–21, 21–16, 15–13	Timo Hammarberg (AUT); Tim Berger (AUT)
Qidong Future; Qidong, China; US$5,000; 31 Jul.–2 Aug. 2026	Aliaksandr Dziadkou (BLR); Pavel Piatrushka (BLR); 21–18, 21–17	Charlie Peters (GER); Colin Paszkiewicz (GER)	Stavros Ntallas (GRE); Dimitrios Chatzinikolaou (GRE); 23–21, 20–22, 18–16	Solomon Bushby (AUS); Justin Schumann (AUS)
Hamburg Elite 16; Hamburg, Germany; US$150,000; 6–9 August 2026	Nils Ehlers (GER); Lui Wüst (GER); 22–20, 21–9	Anders Mol (NOR); Christian Sørum (NOR)	Mārtiņš Pļaviņš (LAT); Kristians Fokerots (LAT) w/o	Steven van de Velde (NED); Yorick de Groot (NED)
Pingtan Future; Pingtan Island, China; US$5,000; 7–9 August 2026	Wu Jiaxin (CHN); Zhou Chaowei (CHN); 20–22, 21–14, 17–15	Lucas Sotelle (BRA); Juca (BRA)	Liu Yuan (CHN); Mao Yuan (CHN); 21–11, 21–17	Taito Mizumachi (JPN); Kota Kurosawa (JPN)
Tallinn Future; Tallinn, Estonia; US$5,000; 20–22 August 2026	Mart Tiisaar (EST); Dimitriy Korotkov (EST); 21–18, 21–19	Laurenz Leitner (AUT); Moritz Kindl (AUT)	Olivers Bulgačs (LAT); Mārcis Bērziņš (LAT); 21–17, 21–18	Szymon Beta (POL); Artem Besarab (POL)
Montréal Elite 16; Montreal, Canada; US$150,000; 20–23 August 2026	Anders Mol (NOR); Christian Sørum (NOR); 21–16, 21–18	André Stein (BRA); Renato Carvalho (BRA)	Sam Schachter (CAN); Jonathan Pickett (CAN); 16–21, 28–26, 15–12	Hendrik Mol (NOR); Mathias Berntsen (NOR)
Bujumbura Future; Bujumbura, Burundi; US$5,000; 20–23 August 2026	Jonah Kjemperud (NOR); Sebastian Kjemperud (NOR); 21–9, 21–18	Benjamin Vaught (USA); Wesley Jensen (USA)	Jiří Dostál (CZE); Filip Rydval (CZE); 21–16, 19–21, 15–13	Florian Manariyo (BDI); Don Carmel Gakiza (BDI)
Brno Future; Brno, Czech Republic; US$5,000; 28–30 August 2026	Ondřej Perušič (CZE); Jakub Šépka (CZE); 21–14, 37–35	Matyas Džavoronok (CZE); Jiří Sedlák (CZE)	Olivers Bulgačs (LAT); Mārcis Bērziņš (LAT); 22–20, 17–21, 15–11	Tobia Marchetto (ITA); Riccardo Iervolino (ITA)
Modena Future; Modena, Italy; US$5,000; 28–30 August 2026	Tiziano Andreatta (ITA); Raoul Acerbi (ITA); 21–17, 21–15	Marco Di Felice (ITA); Davide Borraccino (ITA)	Marco Ulisse (ITA); Giacomo Spadoni (ITA); 30–28, 15–21, 16–14	Enrico Rossi (ITA); Marco Caminati (ITA)
Budapest Future; Budapest, Hungary; US$5,000; 4–6 September 2026	Ivan Likhatskyi (UKR); Richard Likhatskyi (UKR); 21–10, 21–13	Dimitar Mehandzhiyski (BUL); Dimitar Kalchev (BUL)	Sergiy Popov (UKR); Illia Tiurin (UKR); 22–20, 21–10	Michael Klemen (AUT); Elias Holzinger (AUT)
Corigliano-Rossano Future; Corigliano-Rossano, Italy; US$5,000; 18–20 September 2026	Enrico Rossi (ITA); Daniele Lupo (ITA); 21–17, 21–19	Dmytro Kozii (UKR); Sviatoslav Nahornyi (UKR)	Jonas Reinhardt (GER); Milan Sievers (GER); 17–21, 23–21, 15–11	Artúr Hajós (HUN); Lukas Niemeier (HUN)
Alanya Future; Alanya, Turkey; US$5,000; 16–18 October 2026	Julian Hikel (GER); Kalle Pieper (GER); 21–18, 19–21, 16–14	Yusuf Özdemir (TUR); Batuhan Kuru (TUR)	Artúr Hajós (HUN); Lukas Niemeier (HUN); 21–19, 21–12	Michael Klemen (AUT); Elias Holzinger (AUT)

=== Women ===
Tournament	Champions	Runners-up	Third place	Fourth place
Bhubaneswar Challenge; Bhubaneswar, India; US$75,000; 5–8 March 2026	Alexis Durish (USA); Audrey Koenig (USA); 21–18, 21–16	Asami Shiba (JPN); Reika Murakami (JPN)	Sara Hughes (USA); Allysa Batenhorst (USA); 19–21, 21–15, 15–12	Natalie Myszkowski (USA); Carly Kan (USA)
Sanya Future; Sanya, China; US$5,000; 6–8 March 2026	Miki Ishii (JPN); Mayu Kikuchi (JPN); 21–19, 21–16	Yu Tong (CHN); Qi Siyu (CHN)	Cao Shuting (CHN); Aheidan Mushajiang (CHN); 21–11, 21–19	Harumi Sakai (JPN); Shion Tsubouchi (JPN)
João Pessoa Elite 16; João Pessoa, Brazil; US$150,000; 11–15 March 2026	Kristen Cruz (USA); Taryn Brasher (USA); 21–16, 21–19	Ana Patrícia (BRA); Duda Lisboa (BRA)	Megan Kraft (USA); Kelly Cheng (USA); 22–20, 21–12	Claudia Scampoli (ITA); Giada Bianchi (ITA)
Coolangatta Future; Coolangatta, Australia; US$5,000; 12–15 March 2026	Stefanie Fejes (AUS); Jasmine Rayner (AUS); 34–32, 21–18	Francesca Alupei (ROM); Beata Vaida (ROM)	Kaeli Crews (USA); Erica Brok (USA); 21–16, 21–17	Riko Tsujimura (JPN); Takemi Nishibori (JPN)
Haikou Future; Haikou, China; US$5,000; 13–15 March 2026	Jiang Kaiyue (CHN); Dong Jie (CHN); 15–21, 21–18, 15–13	Kadeliye Halaiti (CHN); Zhou Mingli (CHN)	Miki Ishii (JPN); Mayu Kikuchi (JPN); 22–20, 21–19	Yu Tong (CHN); Qi Siyu (CHN)
Tlaxcala Challenge; Tlaxcala, Mexico; US$75,000; 19–22 March 2026	Katerina Pavelková (CZE); Anna Pavelková (CZE); 17–21, 21–13, 15–11	Monika Paulikienė (LTU); Ainė Raupelytė (LTU)	Sara Hughes (USA); Allysa Batenhorst (USA); 21–15, 21–18	Geena Urango (USA); Megan Rice (USA)
Nayarit Challenge; Nuevo Nayarit, Mexico; US$75,000; 26–29 March 2026	Yan Xu (CHN); Xia Xinyi (CHN); 21–18, 16–21, 17–15	Verena Figueira (BRA); Thainara Oliveira (BRA)	Madelyne Anderson (USA); Alaina Chacon (USA); 21–19, 21–15	Melanie Paul (GER); Lea Kunst (GER)
Saquarema Elite 16; Saquarema, Brazil; US$150,000; 8–12 April 2026	Kristen Cruz (USA); Taryn Brasher (USA); 21–15, 21–15	Melissa Humana-Paredes (CAN); Brandie Wilkerson (CAN)	Nina Brunner (SUI); Tanja Hüberli (SUI); 22–20, 21–11	Carolina Solberg Salgado (BRA); Rebecca Cavalcante (BRA)
Brasília Elite 16; Brasília, Brazil; US$150,000; 29 Apr.–3 May 2026	Carolina Solberg Salgado (BRA); Rebecca Cavalcante (BRA); 21–14, 21–18	Valentina Gottardi (ITA); Reka Orsi Toth (ITA)	Savannah Cory (USA); Devon Newberry (USA); 21–15, 21–19	Tīna Graudiņa (LAT); Anastasija Samoilova (LAT)
Xiamen Challenge; Xiamen, China; US$75,000; 14–17 May 2026	Alexis Durish (USA); Audrey Koenig (USA); 21–15, 19–21, 16–14	Monika Paulikienė (LTU); Ainė Raupelytė (LTU)	Lézana Placette (FRA); Alexia Richard (FRA); 21–10, 27–25	Yan Xu (CHN); VXia Xinyi (CHN)
Madrid Future; Madrid, Spain; US$5,000; 15–17 May 2026	Sofía Izuzquiza (ESP); Tania Moreno (ESP); 21–19, 21–14	María Belén Carro (ESP); Paula Soria (ESP)	Clara Windeleff (DEN); Astrid Mellmølle (DEN); 21–16, 21–11	Ana Vergara (ESP); Sofía González (ESP)
Nuvali Challenge; Santa Rosa, Philippines; US$75,000; 21–24 May 2026	Monika Paulikienė (LTU); Ainė Raupelytė (LTU); 21–12, 21–11	Madelyne Anderson (USA); Alaina Chacon (USA)	Emi van Driel (NED); Mila Konink (NED); 22–20, 21–18	Valentyna Davidova (UKR); Anhelina Khmil (UKR)
Apeldoorn Future; Apeldoorn, Netherlands; US$5,000; 22–24 May 2026	Leanne van Vegten (NED); Jill de Groot (NED); 21–17, 21–18	Andrea Lorenzová (CZE); Mariana Tomášová (CZE)	Tess Spaansen (NED); Trijntje Veerbeek (NED); 21–15, 24–22	Magdalena Černá (CZE); Anna Pospíšilová (CZE)
Ostrava Elite 16; Ostrava, Czech Republic; US$150,000; 27–31 May 2026	Melissa Humana-Paredes (CAN); Brandie Wilkerson (CAN); 21–16, 21–14	Katja Stam (NED); Raïsa Schoon (NED)	Thamela Galil (BRA); Victória Lopes (BRA); 21–19, 21–12	Joana Mäder (SUI); Leona Kernen (SUI)
Wuhan Future; Wuhan, China; US$5,000; 29–31 May 2026	Kadeliye Halaiti (CHN); Zhou Mingli (CHN); 21–16, 21–8	Lilla Villám (HUN); Stefánia Kun (HUN)	Elea Beutel (GER); Paula Schürholz (GER); 21–14, 21–16	Cao Shuting (CHN); Aheidan Mushajiang (CHN)
Cervia Future; Cervia, Italy; US$5,000; 29–31 May 2026	María Belén Carro (ESP); Paula Soria (ESP); 21–14, 21–12	Andrea Lorenzová (CZE); Mariana Tomášová (CZE)	Selma Robinson (SWE); Isabelle Reffel (SWE); 21–13, 17–21, 15–13	Živa Javornik (SLO); Maja Marolt (SLO)
Kraków Future; Kraków, Poland; US$5,000; 5–7 June 2026	Margherita Tega (ITA); Aurora Mattavelli (ITA); 21–17, 21–16	Danielė Kvedaraitė (LTU); Jekaterina Saulė (LTU)	Anna Pospíšilová (CZE); Julie Honzovičová (CZE); 21–14, 21–18	Noa Sonneville (NED); Esmee Radstake (NED)
Sveti Vlas Future; Sveti Vlas, Bulgaria; US$5,000; 5–7 June 2026	Tetiana Lazarenko (UKR); Sofiia Kurnikova (UKR); 19–21, 21–17, 15–13	Torrey Van Winden (USA); Lindsey Sparks (USA)	Agostina Ghigliazza (ARG); Morena Abdalá (ARG); 21–15, 12–21, 15–11	Selma Robinson (SWE); Isabelle Reffel (SWE)
Alanya Challenge; Alanya, Turkey; US$75,000; 11–14 June 2026	Sofía Izuzquiza (ESP); Tania Moreno (ESP); 21–14, 21–18	Savannah Cory (USA); Devon Newberry (USA)	Joana Mäder (SUI); Leona Kernen (SUI); 21–15, 21–19	Michelle Valiente (PAR); Giuliana Corrales (PAR)
Jūrmala Future; Jūrmala, Latvia; US$5,000; 11–14 June 2026	Tīna Graudiņa (LAT); Anastasija Samoilova (LAT); 19–21, 21–18, 15–9	Clara Windeleff (DEN); Astrid Mellmølle (DEN)	Eva Liisa Kuivonen (EST); Liisa-Lotta Jürgenson (EST); 22–20, 21–16	Marta Carro (ESP); Adriana Serrano (ESP)
Spiez Future; Spiez, Switzerland; US$5,000; 12–14 June 2026	Andrea Lorenzová (CZE); Mariana Tomášová (CZE); 21–13, 15–21, 17–15	Torrey Van Winden (USA); Lindsey Sparks (USA)	Magdalena Rabitsch (AUT); Oleksandra Shkarupa (AUT); 22–20, 21–18	Muriel Bossart (SUI); Linda Abbühl (SUI)
Geneva Future; Geneva, Switzerland; US$5,000; 19–21 June 2026	Torrey Van Winden (USA); Lindsey Sparks (USA); 17–21, 21–19, 15–12	Annique Niederhauser (SUI); Menia Bentele (SUI)	Tambre Nobles (USA); Clara Stowell (USA); 13–21, 22–20, 15–12	Eva Liisa Kuivonen (EST); Liisa-Lotta Jürgenson (EST)
Ios Future; Chora, Greece; US$5,000; 19–21 June 2026	Agostina Ghigliazza (ARG); Morena Abdalá (ARG); 21–15, 12–21, 15–8	Anouk Dupin (FRA); Marine Kinna (FRA)	Līva Ēbere (LAT); Deniela Konstantinova (LAT); 21–14, 17–21, 15–9	Eszter Vasvári (HUN); Zsófi Vasvári (HUN)
Balıkesir Future; Balıkesir, Turkey; US$5,000; 26–28 June 2026	Tetiana Lazarenko (UKR); Sofiia Kurnikova (UKR); 21–18, 21–19	María Belén Carro (ESP); Paula Soria (ESP)	Nigella Negenman (NED); Floor Hogenhout (NED); 21–16, 21–17	Justýna Frommová (CZE); Julie Honzovičová (CZE)
Bridlington Future; Bridlington, England; US$5,000; 26–28 June 2026	Elea Beutel (GER); Paula Schürholz (GER); 21–14, 21–16	Romane Sobezalz (FRA); Anouk Dupin (FRA)	Saofé Duval (FRA); Marilu Pally (FRA); 23–21, 21–9	Melina Mol (NOR); Cathrine Hjeltnes (NOR)
Hangzhou Future; Hangzhou, China; US$5,000; 26–28 June 2026	Taravadee Naraphornrapat (THA); Worapeerachayakorn Kongphopsarutawadee (THA); 10–21, 21–19, 15–10	Jiang Kaiyue (CHN); Dong Jie (CHN)	Yu Tong (CHN); Qi Siyu (CHN); 19–21, 22–20, 16–14	Sakura Ito (JPN); Miki Ishii (JPN)
Gstaad Elite 16; Gstaad, Switzerland; US$150,000; 1–5 July 2026	Kristen Cruz (USA); Taryn Brasher (USA); 21–19, 21–15	Megan Kraft (USA); Kelly Cheng (USA)	Katja Stam (NED); Raïsa Schoon (NED); 21–19, 21–11	Julia Donlin (USA); Lexy Denaburg (USA)
Rzeszów Future; Rzeszów, Poland; US$5,000; 3–5 July 2026	Nigella Negenman (NED); Floor Hogenhout (NED); 24–22, 21–19	Julia Kielak (POL); Zuzanna Kudlik (POL)	Anniina Parkkinen (FIN); Vilhelmiina Prihti (FIN); 21–17, 17–21, 15–13	Tess Spaansen (NED); Trijntje Veerbeek (NED)
Leuven Future; Leuven, Belgium; US$5,000; 10–12 July 2026	Nigella Negenman (NED); Floor Hogenhout (NED); 21–15, 21–17	Oleksandra Shkarupa (AUT); Magdalena Rabitsch (AUT)	Wies Bekhuis (NED); Brecht Piersma (NED); 21–18, 21–16	Anniina Parkkinen (FIN); Vilhelmiina Prihti (FIN)
Sibiu Future; Sibiu, Romania; US$5,000; 10–12 July 2026	Lisa Luini (NED); Benthe Essink (NED); 22–20, 21–17	Adriana Serrano (ESP); Marta Carro (ESP)	Adriana-Maria Burtea (ROM); Beata Vaida (ROM); 21–15, 22–20	Barbora Tokošová (SVK); Martina Tereňová (SVK)
Shangluo Challenge; Shangluo, China; US$75,000; 23–26 July 2026	Markéta Svozilová (CZE); Marie-Sára Štochlová (CZE); 21–16, 17–21, 15–13	Valentyna Davidova (UKR); Anhelina Khmil (UKR)	Molly Shaw (USA); Molly Phillips (USA); 21–19, 16–21, 15–11	Madison Shields (USA); Kylie Kuyava-DeBerg (USA)
Laginha Beach Future; Mindelo, Cape Verde; US$5,000; 24–26 July 2026	Leanne van Vegten (NED); Jill de Groot (NED); 21–15, 21–15	Elin Hoonhout (NED); Kirsten Bröring (NED)	Nazaret Florián (ESP); Carolina Fernández (ESP); 21–18, 16–21, 15–6	Cathrine Hjeltnes (NOR); Julia Moi Tennøy (NOR)
Rio de Janeiro Elite 16; Rio de Janeiro, Brazil; US$150,000; 29 Jul.–2 Aug. 2026	Katja Stam (NED); Raïsa Schoon (NED); 21–16, 21–16	Carolina Solberg Salgado (BRA); Rebecca Cavalcante (BRA)	Megan Kraft (USA); Kelly Cheng (USA); 21–13, 21–9	Clémence Vieira (FRA); Aline Chamereau (FRA)
Qidong Future; Qidong, China; US$5,000; 31 Jul.–2 Aug. 2026	Jiang Kaiyue (CHN); Zhou Mingli (CHN); 19–21, 21–14, 15–13	Kadeliye Halaiti (CHN); Qi Siyu (CHN)	Zhuang Ming (CHN); Wang Jiaying (CHN) w/o	Yan Xu (CHN); Xia Xinyi (CHN)
Hamburg Elite 16; Hamburg, Germany; US$150,000; 6–9 August 2026	Nina Brunner (SUI); Tanja Hüberli (SUI); 21–19, 21–18	Tīna Graudiņa (LAT); Anastasija Samoilova (LAT)	Carolina Solberg Salgado (BRA); Rebecca Cavalcante (BRA); 30–28, 11–21, 15–12	Valentina Gottardi (ITA); Reka Orsi Toth (ITA)
Pingtan Future; Pingtan Island, China; US$5,000; 7–9 August 2026	Jiang Kaiyue (CHN); Zhou Mingli (CHN); 21–13, 21–15	Yu Tong (CHN); Aheidan Mushajiang (CHN)	Katie Horton (USA); Jordan Boulware (USA); 24–22, 21–13	Wei Luoqian (CHN); Chen Yingshan (CHN)
Busan Future; Busan, South Korea; US$5,000; 14–16 August 2026	Khylem Progella (PHI); Sofiah Pagara (PHI); 21–18, 21–13	Sisi Rondina (PHI); Bernadeth Pons (PHI)	Jana Milutinovic (AUS); Jasmine Rayner (AUS); 21–15, 20–22, 15–8	Mayu Sawame (JPN); Wakana Akishige (JPN)
Tallinn Future; Tallinn, Estonia; US$5,000; 20–22 August 2026	Eva Liisa Kuivonen (EST); Liisa-Lotta Jürgenson (EST); 21–18, 18–21, 18–16	Oleksandra Shkarupa (AUT); Magdalena Rabitsch (AUT)	Heleene Hollas (EST); Liisa Remmelg (EST); 21–9, 21–17	Eszter Vasvári (HUN); Zsófi Vasvári (HUN)
Montréal Elite 16; Montreal, Canada; US$150,000; 20–23 August 2026	Thamela Galil (BRA); Victória Lopes (BRA); 19–21, 21–18, 15–12	Kristen Cruz (USA); Taryn Brasher (USA)	Melissa Humana-Paredes (CAN); Brandie Wilkerson (CAN); 20–22, 21–12, 18–16	Svenja Müller (GER); Cinja Tillmann (GER)
Bujumbura Future; Bujumbura, Burundi; US$5,000; 20–23 August 2026	Tjaša Kotnik (SLO); Tajda Lovšin (SLO); 23–21, 21–16	Miharu Kashihara (JPN); Maho Yabumi (JPN)	Riko Tsujimura (JPN); Kako Yajima (JPN); 21–9, 21–19	Yu Okuno (JPN); Nozomi Sekiguchi (JPN)
Brno Future; Brno, Czech Republic; US$5,000; 28–30 August 2026	Kylie Neuschaeferová (CZE); Martina Maixnerová (CZE); 24–22, 22–24, 15–11	Markéta Svozilová (CZE); Marie-Sára Štochlová (CZE)	Andrea Lorenzová (CZE); Mariana Tomášová (CZE); 21–18, 18–21, 15–11	Oleksandra Shkarupa (AUT); Magdalena Rabitsch (AUT)
Modena Future; Modena, Italy; US$5,000; 28–30 August 2026	Valentina Gottardi (ITA); Reka Orsi Toth (ITA); 21–11, 21–12	Leanne van Vegten (NED); Jill de Groot (NED)	Anna Pelloia (ITA); Rachele Mancinelli (ITA) w/o	Claudia Puccinelli (ITA); Aurora Mattavelli (ITA)
Budapest Future; Budapest, Hungary; US$5,000; 4–6 September 2026	Stefánia Kun (HUN); Lilla Villám (HUN); 21–17, 21–11	Nina Pavlova (NOR); Sunniva Helland-Hansen (NOR)	Skalvė Križanauskaitė (LTU); Rugilė Grudzinskaitė (LTU); 21–19, 21–13	Clara Windeleff (DEN); Astrid Mellmølle (DEN)
Corigliano-Rossano Future; Corigliano-Rossano, Italy; US$5,000; 18–20 September 2026	Rika Dieckmann (GER); Sarah Schulz (GER); 21–19, 14–21, 15–12	Aleksandra Gromadowska (POL); Agnieszka Adamek (POL)	Giulia Gavio (BRA); Carol Sallaberry (BRA); 21–16, 21–11	Cindy Lee Fezzi (ITA); Jessica Belliero (25x17px)
Alanya Future; Alanya, Turkey; US$5,000; 16–18 October 2026	Lisa Luini (NED); Benthe Essink (NED); 21–18, 21–18	Riko Tsujimura (JPN); Mayu Kikuchi (JPN)	Nele Barber (GER); Tabea Schwarz (GER); 17–21, 21–19, 15–11	Andressa Cavalcanti (BRA); Thais Treumann (BRA)

== Medal table by country ==
Rank	Nation	Gold	Silver	Bronze	Total
1	Netherlands	12	5	7	24
2	United States	7	9	13	29
3	China	7	6	5	18
4	Italy	7	4	4	15
5	Germany	6	2	9	17
6	Czech Republic	5	7	3	15
7	Australia	5	1	2	8
8	Ukraine	4	3	3	10
9	Spain	4	3	1	8
10	Latvia	4	2	6	12
11	Norway	4	2	1	7
12	Sweden	3	3	1	7
13	Hungary	3	2	3	8
14	Belgium	3	0	2	5
15	Brazil	2	5	4	11
16	Poland	2	5	2	9
17	Estonia	2	2	2	6
18	Thailand	2	1	1	4
19	Japan	1	3	2	6
20	Lithuania	1	3	1	5
21	Switzerland	1	2	3	6
22	Canada	1	1	3	5
23	Argentina	1	1	1	3
24	Philippines	1	1	0	2
25	Israel	1	0	2	3
26	Slovenia	1	0	1	2
27	Belarus	1	0	0	1
28	France	0	4	3	7
29	Austria	0	3	1	4
30	Turkey	0	3	0	3
31	England	0	2	1	3
32	Denmark	0	1	1	2
32	Greece	0	1	1	2
32	Romania	0	1	1	2
35	Bulgaria	0	1	0	1
35	Iran	0	1	0	1
35	Serbia	0	1	0	1
38	Finland	0	0	1	1
Totals (38 entries)		91	91	91	273
