= Kristen Nuss =

American beach volleyball player

Personal information
- National team: United States
- Born: December 16, 1997 (age 28) New Orleans, Louisiana, U.S.
- Education: Louisiana State University
- Years active: 2021–present
- Height: 5 ft 6 in (168 cm)

Sport
- Sport: Beach Volleyball
- College team: LSU Tigers
- Turned pro: 2017
- Partner: Taryn Kloth (2021–present)

Achievements and titles
- Highest world ranking: No. 2 (Dec 2023)
Medal record
Women's beach volleyball
Representing the United States
World Championships
Silver medal – second place	2025 Adelaide	Beach
Bronze medal – third place	2023 Tlaxcala	Beach
World Tour Finals
Gold medal – first place	2023 Doha	Beach
Gold medal – first place	2024 Doha	Beach
World Tour
Gold medal – first place	2022 Coolangatta	Beach
Gold medal – first place	2022 Kusadasi	Beach
Gold medal – first place	2023 La Paz	Beach
Gold medal – first place	2023 Uberlandia	Beach
Gold medal – first place	2024 Espinho	Beach
Gold medal – first place	2024 Gstaad	Beach
Gold medal – first place	2025 Brasília	Beach
Gold medal – first place	2025 Gstaad	Beach
Gold medal – first place	2025 Newport Beach	Beach
Gold medal – first place	2026 João Pessoa	Beach
Gold medal – first place	2026 Saquarema	Beach
Gold medal – first place	2026 Gstaad	Beach
Silver medal – second place	2023 Hamburg	Beach
Silver medal – second place	2023 Paris	Beach
Silver medal – second place	2024 Brasilia	Beach
Silver medal – second place	2025 Saquarema	Beach
Bronze medal – third place	2023 Gstaad	Beach
Bronze medal – third place	2025 Playa del Carmen	Beach
AVP Tour
Gold medal – first place	2021 Atlanta	Beach
Gold medal – first place	2022 Austin	Beach
Gold medal – first place	2022 Chicago	Beach
Gold medal – first place	2022 Phoenix	Beach
Gold medal – first place	2023 Atlanta	Beach
Gold medal – first place	2023 Chicago	Beach
Gold medal – first place	2024 Huntington Beach	Beach
Gold medal – first place	2024 Manhattan Beach	Beach
Gold medal – first place	2025 Huntington Beach	Beach
Gold medal – first place	2025 Manhattan Beach	Beach
Silver medal – second place	2022 New Orleans	Beach
Silver medal – second place	2024 Huntington Beach	Beach
Silver medal – second place	2024 Chicago	Beach
Bronze medal – third place	2021 Chicago	Beach
Bronze medal – third place	2023 New Orleans	Beach
Bronze medal – third place	2023 Huntington Beach	Beach
Bronze medal – third place	2026 Huntington Beach	Beach

Kristen Cruz (born Kristen Nuss, December 16, 1997) is an American beach volleyball player, currently competing in the FIVB World Tour/Pro Beach Tour. She competed at the 2024 Summer Olympics in Paris with Taryn Kloth.

== Early life ==
Nuss was born and raised in New Orleans, Louisiana to Audrey and George. She is the youngest of four children, with older brothers Pete, Jeffrey, and Jordan.

Nuss was a multi-sport athlete throughout high school, leading Mount Carmel Academy to three indoor volleyball and two basketball state titles, though beach volleyball was the sport she enjoyed most. Nuss was a LHSAA Division I MVP and Gatorade Player of the Year candidate for indoor volleyball.

== College ==
Nuss attended Louisiana State University starting in 2017 and quickly found success on the sand with fellow freshman Claire Coppola. The pair accumulated nine wins over NCAA ranked teams, including seven against top-10 ranked teams. At one point during their freshman season, they won 20 of 21 matches, finishing with a 27-7 record and being named to Volleyballmag.com's All-America team. The pair's success grew in following seasons, compiling records of 31-8 and 33-4 over the following two seasons, winning the USA Volleyball Collegiate Beach Championship, CCSA Pair of the Year, AVCA All-America honors in back-to-back years. They were the first pair to win consecutive CCSA Pair of the Year awards. Their junior season also saw them top the Tigers' individual wins list at 81. Their 2020 season saw them reach the 100 wins mark, becoming the third pair to do so behind USC's Sara Hughes and Kelly Cheng and UCLA's Megan and Nicole McNamara.

During the COVID-19 pandemic, Nuss began training with Taryn Kloth, an indoor volleyball player for Creighton who had transferred to LSU. Despite having never played beach volleyball before, the pair went on to finish the 2021 season with a 36-0 record, the second ever team to complete an undefeated season and the NCAA title.

Nuss graduated with a Bachelor of Science degree in kinesiology, finishing her college career as one of the most decorated NCAA beach volleyball players ever with 136 total victories, three CCSA Pair of the Year and AVCA All-American awards, two USA Volleyball Collegiate Beach Championships, and Volleyballmag.com Player of the Year.

== Professional career ==
=== 2021–2023: Beginnings and Olympic Qualification ===
Nuss and Kloth turned professional upon graduating in 2021, with the goal of qualifying for the Olympics in Paris, but opting to keep their base in New Orleans instead of moving to Southern California. They initially struggled to qualify for international tournaments, but eventually broke through with Gold in the 2022 BPT Coolangatta Futures. Shortly thereafter, the pair beat the Tokyo Silver Medalists, Australians Mariafe Artacho del Solar and Taliqua Clancy, en route to the Gold at the 2022 BPT Kusadasi Challenge (21-12, 17-21, 17-15).

The pair started 2023 with wins in two of their first four World Tour tournaments, and followed it up with three medals in five tournaments during the European leg of the tour schedule. In the World Championships, the pair reached the semifinals, losing in three sets to their American counterparts Kelly Cheng and Sara Hughes. They rematched with the Australian Olympic silver medalists Mariafe and Clancy to win bronze (15-21, 21-19, 15-8) at the World Championships. Nuss and Kloth then cruised to win Gold at the World Tour Finals, not dropping a single set, to reach the No. 2 FIVB ranking and qualify for the Olympics in Paris.

=== 2024: Olympics ===
Nuss participated in the 2024 Summer Olympics in Paris with Kloth.

== Personal life ==
Her grandfather, Ralph 'Putsy' Caballero, played for the Philadelphia Phillies in 1944, becoming the youngest ever player for the franchise at the time at age 16. On January 9, 2026, she married volleyball coach Trey Cruz, taking his last name.

== Career podiums ==
=== Pro Beach Tour ===
- 20 medals – (12 gold, 5 silver, 3 bronze)

Legend
World Championships
Tour Finals
Elite 16 Tournaments
Challenge Tournaments
Future Tournaments

No.	Result	Date	Category	Venue	Partner	Opponents	Score		
1.	Gold	3 Apr 2022	Future	Coolangatta, Australia	Taryn Kloth	(Australia) Laird / Bell	19–21	21–9	15–7
2.	Gold	22 May 2022	Challenge	Kuşadası, Turkey	Taryn Kloth	(Australia) Artacho / Clancy	21–12	17–21	17–15
3.	Gold	19 Mar 2023	Challenge	La Paz, Mexico	Taryn Kloth	(United States) Simo / Rodriguez	21–16	21–13	
4.	Gold	30 Apr 2023	Elite 16	Uberlândia, Brazil	Taryn Kloth	(Australia) Artacho / Clancy	21–12	17–21	17–15
5.	Bronze	9 Jul 2023	Elite 16	Gstaad, Switzerland	Taryn Kloth	(Germany) Müller / Tillmann	21–19	21–16	
6.	Silver	20 Aug 2023	Elite 16	Hamburg, Germany	Taryn Kloth	(Brazil) Duda / Ana Patrícia	16–21	17–21	
7.	Silver	1 Oct 2023	Elite 16	Paris, France	Taryn Kloth	(Brazil) Duda / Ana Patrícia	10–21	21–18	13–15
8.	Bronze	15 Oct 2023	World Championships	Tlaxcala, Mexico	Taryn Kloth	(Australia) Artacho / Clancy	15–21	21–19	15–8
9.	Gold	9 Dec 2023	Tour Finals	Doha, Qatar	Taryn Kloth	(Germany) Müller / Tillmann	21–17	21–14	
10.	Silver	5 May 2024	Elite 16	Brasília, Brazil	Taryn Kloth	(Brazil) Duda / Ana Patrícia	17–21	14–21	
11.	Gold	26 May 2024	Elite 16	Espinho, Portugal	Taryn Kloth	(Switzerland) Brunner / Hüberli	17–21	28–26	15–10
12.	Gold	7 Jul 2024	Elite 16	Gstaad, Switzerland	Taryn Kloth	(United States) Cannon / Kraft	19–21	21–15	15–11
13.	Gold	7 Dec 2024	Tour Finals	Doha, Qatar	Taryn Kloth	(United States) Cannon / Kraft	21–19	21–17	
14.	Bronze	30 March 2025	Elite 16	Playa del Carmen, Mexico	Taryn Brasher	(United States) Shaw / Cheng	21–16	21–14	
15.	Silver	13 April 2025	Elite 16	Saquarema, Brazil	Taryn Brasher	(Brazil) Galil / Lopes	19–21	21–16	10–15
16.	Gold	20 April 2025	Elite 16	Brasília, Brazil	Taryn Brasher	(Brazil) Carolina Solberg / Cavalcante	22–20	21–19	
17.	Gold	6 July 2025	Elite 16	Gstaad, Switzerland	Taryn Brasher	(Latvia) Graudiņa / Samoilova	21–19	21–18	
18.	Gold	11 October 2025	Elite 16	Newport Beach, United States	Taryn Brasher	(United States) Donlin / Denaburg	21–15	21–14	
19.	Silver	23 November 2025	World Championships	Adelaide, Australia	Taryn Brasher	(Latvia) Graudiņa / Samoilova	15–21	21–15	11–15
20.	Gold	15 March 2026	Elite 16	João Pessoa, Brazil	Taryn Brasher	(Brazil) Duda / Ana Patrícia	21–16	21–19	
