= Taryn Brasher =

American beach volleyball player

Taryn Kloth Brasher

Personal information
- Full name: Taryn Kloth Brasher
- Nationality: American
- Born: April 10, 1997 (age 29); Sioux Falls, South Dakota, U.S.
- Height: 6 ft 4 in (193 cm)
- Education: Creighton University; Louisiana State University

Beach volleyball information

Current teammate
Teammate
Kristen Nuss
Medal record
Women's beach volleyball
Representing the United States
World Championships
Silver medal – second place	2025 Adelaide	Beach
Bronze medal – third place	2023 Tlaxcala	Beach
World Tour Finals
Gold medal – first place	2023 Doha	Beach
Gold medal – first place	2024 Doha	Beach
World Tour
Gold medal – first place	2022 Coolangatta	Beach
Gold medal – first place	2022 Kusadasi	Beach
Gold medal – first place	2023 La Paz	Beach
Gold medal – first place	2023 Uberlandia	Beach
Gold medal – first place	2024 Espinho	Beach
Gold medal – first place	2024 Gstaad	Beach
Gold medal – first place	2025 Brasília	Beach
Gold medal – first place	2025 Gstaad	Beach
Gold medal – first place	2025 Newport Beach	Beach
Gold medal – first place	2026 João Pessoa	Beach
Gold medal – first place	2026 Saquarema	Beach
Gold medal – first place	2026 Gstaad	Beach
Silver medal – second place	2023 Hamburg	Beach
Silver medal – second place	2023 Paris	Beach
Silver medal – second place	2024 Brasilia	Beach
Silver medal – second place	2025 Saquarema	Beach
Bronze medal – third place	2023 Gstaad	Beach
Bronze medal – third place	2025 Playa del Carmen	Beach

Taryn Kloth Brasher (/ˈtærɪn ˈkloʊθ/ TARR-in KLOHTH BRAY-sher; born April 10, 1997) is an American beach volleyball player. She played with Kristen Nuss at the 2024 Summer Olympics in Paris.

== Early life ==
Kloth attended O'Gorman Catholic High School in Sioux Falls, South Dakota. In her senior season, she had 558 kills, 314 digs, 90 block, and 41 aces, concluding her high school career with 1,137 kills, 744 digs, and two state volleyball titles. She was named the South Dakota Gatorade Player of the Year in 2014.

== Personal life ==
She has three sisters and four brothers. On January 25, 2025, Taryn married Eric Brasher.

== Career podiums ==
=== Pro Beach Tour ===
- 22 medals – (14 gold, 5 silver, 3 bronze)

Legend
World Championships
Tour Finals
Elite 16 Tournaments
Challenge Tournaments
Future Tournaments

No.	Result	Date	Category	Venue	Partner	Opponents	Score		
1.	Gold	3 Apr 2022	Future	Coolangatta, Australia	Kristen Nuss	(Australia) Laird / Bell	19–21	21–9	15–7
2.	Gold	22 May 2022	Challenge	Kuşadası, Turkey	Kristen Nuss	(Australia) Artacho / Clancy	21–12	17–21	17–15
3.	Gold	19 Mar 2023	Challenge	La Paz, Mexico	Kristen Nuss	(United States) Simo / Rodriguez	21–16	21–13	
4.	Gold	30 Apr 2023	Elite 16	Uberlândia, Brazil	Kristen Nuss	(Australia) Artacho / Clancy	21–12	17–21	17–15
5.	Bronze	9 Jul 2023	Elite 16	Gstaad, Switzerland	Kristen Nuss	(Germany) Müller / Tillmann	21–19	21–16	
6.	Silver	20 Aug 2023	Elite 16	Hamburg, Germany	Kristen Nuss	(Brazil) Duda / Ana Patrícia	16–21	17–21	
7.	Silver	1 Oct 2023	Elite 16	Paris, France	Kristen Nuss	(Brazil) Duda / Ana Patrícia	10–21	21–18	13–15
8.	Bronze	15 Oct 2023	World Championships	Tlaxcala, Mexico	Kristen Nuss	(Australia) Artacho / Clancy	15–21	21–19	15–8
9.	Gold	9 Dec 2023	Tour Finals	Doha, Qatar	Kristen Nuss	(Germany) Müller / Tillmann	21–17	21–14	
10.	Silver	5 May 2024	Elite 16	Brasília, Brazil	Kristen Nuss	(Brazil) Duda / Ana Patrícia	17–21	14–21	
11.	Gold	26 May 2024	Elite 16	Espinho, Portugal	Kristen Nuss	(Switzerland) Brunner / Hüberli	17–21	28–26	15–10
12.	Gold	7 Jul 2024	Elite 16	Gstaad, Switzerland	Kristen Nuss	(United States) Cannon / Kraft	19–21	21–15	15–11
13.	Gold	7 Dec 2024	Tour Finals	Doha, Qatar	Kristen Nuss	(United States) Cannon / Kraft	21–19	21–17	
14.	Bronze	30 March 2025	Elite 16	Playa del Carmen, Mexico	Kristen Nuss	(United States) Shaw / Cheng	21–16	21–14	
15.	Silver	13 April 2025	Elite 16	Saquarema, Brazil	Kristen Nuss	(Brazil) Galil / Lopes	19–21	21–16	10–15
16.	Gold	20 April 2025	Elite 16	Brasília, Brazil	Kristen Nuss	(Brazil) Carolina Solberg / Cavalcante	22–20	21–19	
17.	Gold	6 July 2025	Elite 16	Gstaad, Switzerland	Kristen Nuss	(Latvia) Graudiņa / Samoilova	21–19	21–18	
18.	Gold	11 October 2025	Elite 16	Newport Beach, United States	Kristen Nuss	(United States) Donlin / Denaburg	21–15	21–14	
19.	Silver	23 November 2025	World Championships	Adelaide, Australia	Kristen Nuss	(Latvia) Graudiņa / Samoilova	15–21	21–15	11–15
20.	Gold	15 March 2026	Elite 16	João Pessoa, Brazil	Kristen Cruz	(Brazil) Duda / Ana Patrícia	21–16	21–19	
21.	Gold	12 April 2026	Elite 16	Saquarema, Brazil	Kristen Cruz	(Canada) Humana-Paredes / Wilkerson	21–15	21–15	
22.	Gold	5 July 2026	Elite 16	(Switzerland) Gstaad, Brazil	Kristen Cruz	(United States) Kraft / Cheng	21–19	21–15	
