= 2025 Beach Volleyball World Championships =

2025 World Championships
- Location: Adelaide, Australia
- Dates: 14–23 November

Champions
- Men: Sweden; David Åhman; Jonatan Hellvig
- Women: Latvia; Tīna Graudiņa; Anastasija Samoilova

The 2025 Beach Volleyball World Championships took place in Adelaide, Australia, from 14 to 23 November 2025.

== Competition schedule ==
P	Preliminary round	LL	Lucky losers playoffs	1/16	Round of 32	1/8	Round of 16	1/4	Quarter-finals	1/2	Semi-finals	B	Bronze medal match	F	Final

Date Event	Fri 14	Sat 15	Sun 16	Mon 17	Tue 18		Wed 19	Thu 20	Fri 21	Sat 22	Sun 23	
Men's tournament	P	P	P	P	LL	1/16	1/16	1/8	1/4	1/2	B	F
Women's tournament	P	P	P	P	LL	1/16	1/16	1/8	1/4	1/2	B	F

== Medal summary ==
=== Medal table ===
* Host nation (Australia)

Rank	Nation	Gold	Silver	Bronze	Total
1	Sweden	1	1	0	2
2	Latvia	1	0	0	1
3	United States	0	1	0	1
4	Brazil	0	0	1	1
4	France	0	0	1	1
Totals (5 entries)		2	2	2	6

=== Medal events ===
Event	Gold	Silver	Bronze
Men	Sweden; David Åhman; Jonatan Hellvig	Sweden; Jacob Nilsson; Elmer Andersson	France; Téo Rotar; Arnaud Gauthier-Rat
Women	Latvia; Tīna Graudiņa; Anastasija Samoilova	United States; Kristen Nuss; Taryn Brasher	Brazil; Carolina Solberg Salgado; Rebecca Cavalcante

== Men's tournament ==
=== Knockout stage bracket ===
Round of 32
19 November
(Norway) A. Mol – Sørum	2
(Canada) Schachter – Pickett	1
19 November
(Latvia) Pļaviņš – Fokerots	0
(Germany) Ehlers – Wickler	2
18 November
(United States) Evans – Budinger	0
(Portugal) Pedrosa – Campos	2
18 November
(Chile) M. Grimalt – E. Grimalt	1
(Czech Republic) Perušič – Schweiner	2
18 November
(Poland) Bryl – Łosiak	0
(Sweden) Åhman – Hellvig	2
18 November
(Switzerland) Haussener – Friedli	1
(France) Bassereau – Aye	2
19 November
(Switzerland) Krattiger – Dillier	2
(Netherlands) Boermans – De Groot	0
19 November
(New Zealand) Fuller – O'Dea	1
(Brazil) Evandro – Arthur	2
19 November
(Brazil) André – Renato	2
(Austria) Hammarberg – Berger	0
19 November
(Sweden) Nilsson – Andersson	2
(Germany) Henning – Wüst	0
18 November
(Argentina) T. Capogrosso – N. Capogrosso	1
(United States) Schalk – Shaw	2
18 November
(United States) Partain – Benesh	1
(Cuba) Díaz – Alayo	2
18 November
(France) Rotar – Gauthier-Rat	2
(Argentina) Amieva – Bueno	0
18 November
(Brazil) George – Saymon	0
(Qatar) Cherif – Ahmed	2
19 November
(Australia) Nicolaidis – Carracher	0
(Germany) Pfretzschner – Winter	2
19 November
(Norway) H. Mol – Berntsen	2
(Austria) Dressler – Waller	0

Round of 16
20 November
(Norway) A. Mol – Sørum	1
(Germany) Ehlers – Wickler	2
20 November
(Portugal) Pedrosa – Campos	0
(Czech Republic) Perušič – Schweiner	2
20 November
(Sweden) Åhman – Hellvig	2
(France) Bassereau – Aye	0
20 November
(Switzerland) Krattiger – Dillier	1
(Brazil) Evandro – Arthur	2
20 November
(Brazil) André – Renato	0
(Sweden) Nilsson – Andersson	2
20 November
(United States) Schalk – Shaw	2
(Cuba) Díaz – Alayo	0
20 November
(France) Rotar – Gauthier-Rat	2
(Qatar) Cherif – Ahmed	1
20 November
(Germany) Pfretzschner – Winter	2
(Norway) H. Mol – Berntsen	0

Quarter-finals
21 November
(Germany) Ehlers – Wickler	2
(Czech Republic) Perušič – Schweiner	0
21 November
(Sweden) Åhman – Hellvig	2
(Brazil) Evandro – Arthur	0
21 November
(Sweden) Nilsson – Andersson	2
(United States) Schalk – Shaw	0
21 November
(France) Rotar – Gauthier-Rat	2
(Germany) Pfretzschner – Winter	1

Semi-finals
22 November
(Germany) Ehlers – Wickler	0
(Sweden) Åhman – Hellvig	2
22 November
(Sweden) Nilsson – Andersson	2
(France) Rotar – Gauthier-Rat	0

Final
23 November
(Sweden) Åhman – Hellvig	2
(Sweden) Nilsson – Andersson	0
Third place
23 November
(Germany) Ehlers – Wickler	0
(France) Rotar – Gauthier-Rat	2

== Women's tournament ==
=== Knockout stage bracket ===
Round of 32
19 November
(Brazil) Thamela – Victória	2
(France) Placette – Richard	1
19 November
(Japan) Shiba – Murakami	0
(Ukraine) Lazarenko – Romaniuk	2
18 November
(Italy) Gottardi – Orsi Toth	2
(Germany) Müller – Tillmann	0
18 November
(New Zealand) Polley – MacDonald	0
(Germany) Bock – Lippmann	2
18 November
(Latvia) Tīna – Anastasija	2
(Netherlands) Konink – Poiesz	0
18 November
(Netherlands) Van Driel – Bekhuis	0
(Germany) Paul – Kunst	2
19 November
(Austria) D. Klinger – R. Klinger	0
(United States) Shaw – Cheng	2
19 November
(United States) Cannon – Kraft	0
(Czech Republic) Kylie – Maixnerová	2
19 November
(United States) Nuss – Brasher	2
(Italy) Scampoli – Bianchi	0
19 November
(Netherlands) Stam – Schoon	2
(China) Wang – Xia	0
18 November
(Switzerland) Anouk – Zoé	1
(United States) Donlin – Denaburg	2
18 November
(Puerto Rico) González – Navas	0
(Brazil) Ana Patrícia – Duda	2
18 November
(Spain) Dani – Moreno	2
(Switzerland) Niederhauser – Kernen	1
18 November
(Ukraine) Davidova – Khmil	0
(Canada) Melissa – Brandie	2
19 November
(Germany) Ittlinger – Grüne	2
(Czech Republic) Svozilová – Štochlová	1
19 November
(Brazil) Carol – Rebecca	2
(Australia) Fleming – Fejes	0

Round of 16
20 November
(Brazil) Thamela – Victória	2
(Ukraine) Lazarenko – Romaniuk	1
20 November
(Italy) Gottardi – Orsi Toth	2
(Germany) Bock – Lippmann	0
20 November
(Latvia) Tīna – Anastasija	2
(Germany) Paul – Kunst	0
20 November
(United States) Shaw – Cheng	2
(Czech Republic) Kylie – Maixnerová	0
20 November
(United States) Nuss – Brasher	2
(Netherlands) Stam – Schoon	1
20 November
(United States) Donlin – Denaburg	w/o
(Brazil) Ana Patrícia – Duda
20 November
(Spain) Dani – Moreno	0
(Canada) Melissa – Brandie	2
20 November
(Germany) Ittlinger – Grüne	0
(Brazil) Carol – Rebecca	2

Quarter-finals
21 November
(Brazil) Thamela – Victória	2
(Italy) Gottardi – Orsi Toth	0
21 November
(Latvia) Tīna – Anastasija	2
(United States) Shaw – Cheng	0
21 November
(United States) Nuss – Brasher	2
(United States) Donlin – Denaburg	0
21 November
(Canada) Melissa – Brandie	1
(Brazil) Carol – Rebecca	2

Semi-finals
22 November
(Brazil) Thamela – Victória	0
(Latvia) Tīna – Anastasija	2
22 November
(United States) Nuss – Brasher	2
(Brazil) Carol – Rebecca	1

Final
23 November
(Latvia) Tīna – Anastasija	2
(United States) Nuss – Brasher	1
Third place
23 November
(Brazil) Thamela – Victória	0
(Brazil) Carol – Rebecca	2
