= Alupei =

Alupei is a Romanian surname. Notable people with the surname include:

- Angela Alupei (born 1972), Romanian rower
- Dorin Alupei (born 1973), Romanian rower
- Francesca Alupei (born 2003), Romanian volleyball player
