= 2025 FIVB Volleyball World Championship =

2025 FIVB Volleyball World Championship may refer to:

- 2025 FIVB Women's Volleyball World Championship, the women's indoor volleyball championship in Thailand
- 2025 FIVB Men's Volleyball World Championship, the women's indoor volleyball championship in the Philippines
- 2025 Beach Volleyball World Championships, the women's beach volleyball championship in Australia
