= Daria Romaniuk =

Ukrainian beach volleyball player (born 2004)

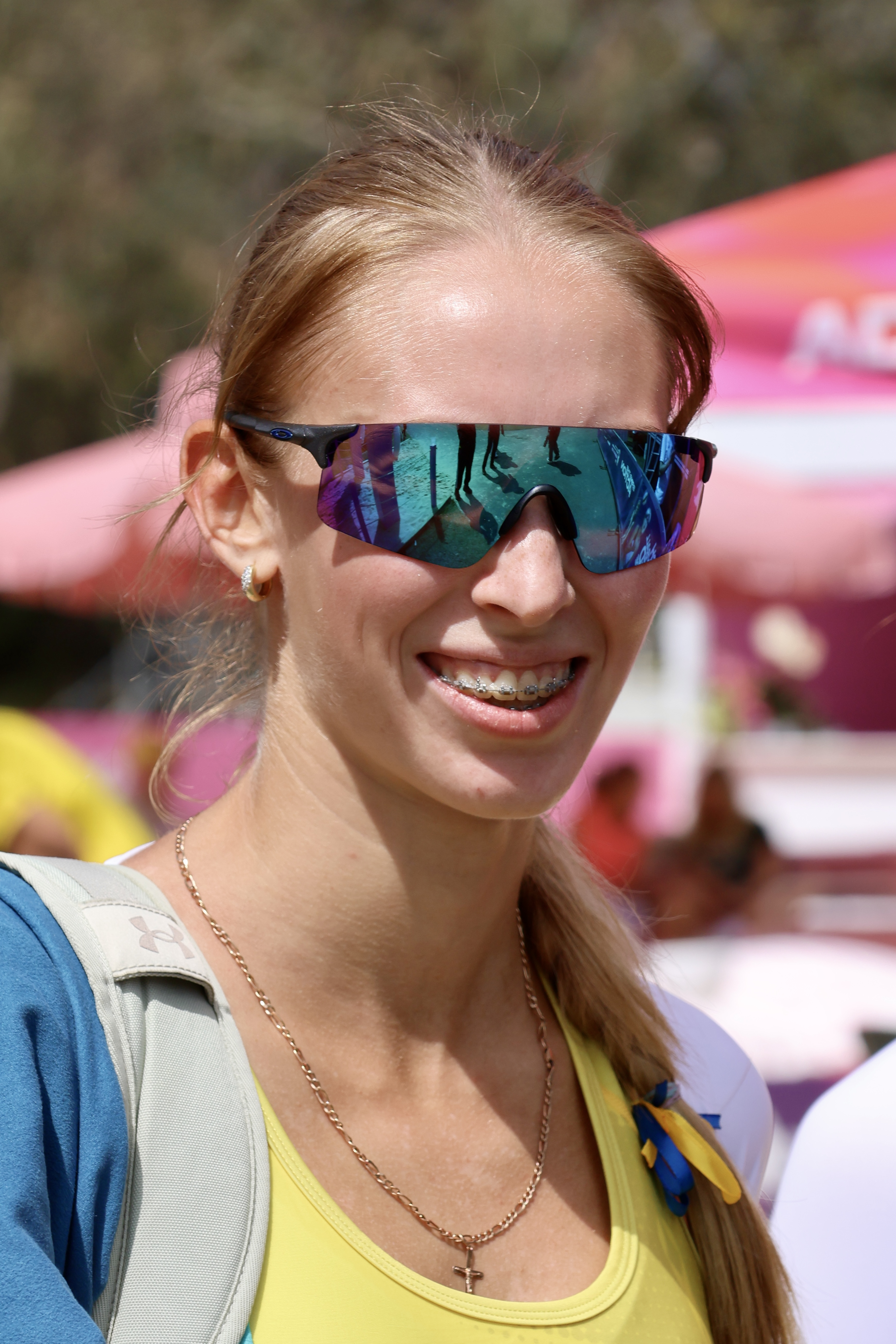
- Romaniuk at the 2025 World Championships

Personal information
- Nationality: Ukrainian
- Born: 12 August 2004 (age 21) Chornomorsk, Ukraine

Sport
- Sport: Beach volleyball
Medal record
Women's beach volleyball
Representing Ukraine
Volleyball World Beach Pro Tour
Gold medal – first place	2024	Warsaw Future
Gold medal – first place	2024	Balıkesir Future
Gold medal – first place	2025	Sveti Vlas Future
Bronze medal – third place	2025	Valencia Future
World U19 Championships
Gold medal – first place	2022 Dikili	Beach
European U22 Championships
Gold medal – first place	2025 Baden	Beach
European U18 Championships
Silver medal – second place	2020 İzmir	Beach
Silver medal – second place	2021 Ljubljana	Beach

Daria Romaniuk (born 12 August 2004) is a Ukrainian beach volleyball player.

In 2020, Romaniuk competed with her partner Hanna Chechelnytska at the European U-18 Beach Volleyball Championships, held in İzmir. She received a silver medal, losing in the final match to Anhelina Khmil and Tetiana Lazarenko.

The following year, Romaniuk partnered with Yeva Serdiuk. The duo competed at the European U-18 Beach Volleyball Championships, held in Ljubljana, winning a silver medal.

In 2022, the duo became world champions at the 2022 FIVB Beach Volleyball U19 World Championships in Dikili. Romaniuk also competed with Daria Sheremetieva at the 2022 ISF Gymnasiade in Normandy, winning a gold medal.
