= Yeva Serdiuk =

Ukrainian beach volleyball player

Personal information
- Nationality: Ukrainian
- Born: 5 January 2004 (age 22) Chornomorsk, Ukraine

Sport
- Sport: Beach volleyball
Medal record
Women's beach volleyball
Representing Ukraine
Volleyball World Beach Pro Tour
Gold medal – first place	2024	Warsaw Future
Gold medal – first place	2024	Balıkesir Future
Gold medal – first place	2025	Sveti Vlas Future
Bronze medal – third place	2025	Valencia Future
World U19 Championships
Gold medal – first place	2022 Dikili	Beach
European U22 Championships
Gold medal – first place	2025 Baden	Beach
European U18 Championships
Silver medal – second place	2021 Ljubljana	Beach

Yeva Serdiuk (born 5 January 2004) is a Ukrainian beach volleyball player.

== Early life and education ==
She was born on 5 January 2004, in Chornomorsk.

As of 2024 she was studying at the State College of Florida, Manatee–Sarasota.

== Career ==
Yeva is a beach volleyball player.

With Daria Romaniuk, Yeva represented Ukraine at the European U-18 Beach Volleyball Championships, held in Ljubljana, winning a silver medal.

In 2022, Serdiuk/Romaniuk became world champions at the 2022 FIVB Beach Volleyball U19 World Championships in Dikili.

Since 2023, Anhelina Khmil became her partner, and they won bronze medals at the 2023 Ukrainian National Beach Volleyball U22 Championships. Khmil/Serdiuk competed at the 2023 European U22 Beach Volleyball Championships without reaching semi-finals.
