= Anders Mol =

Norwegian beach volleyball player

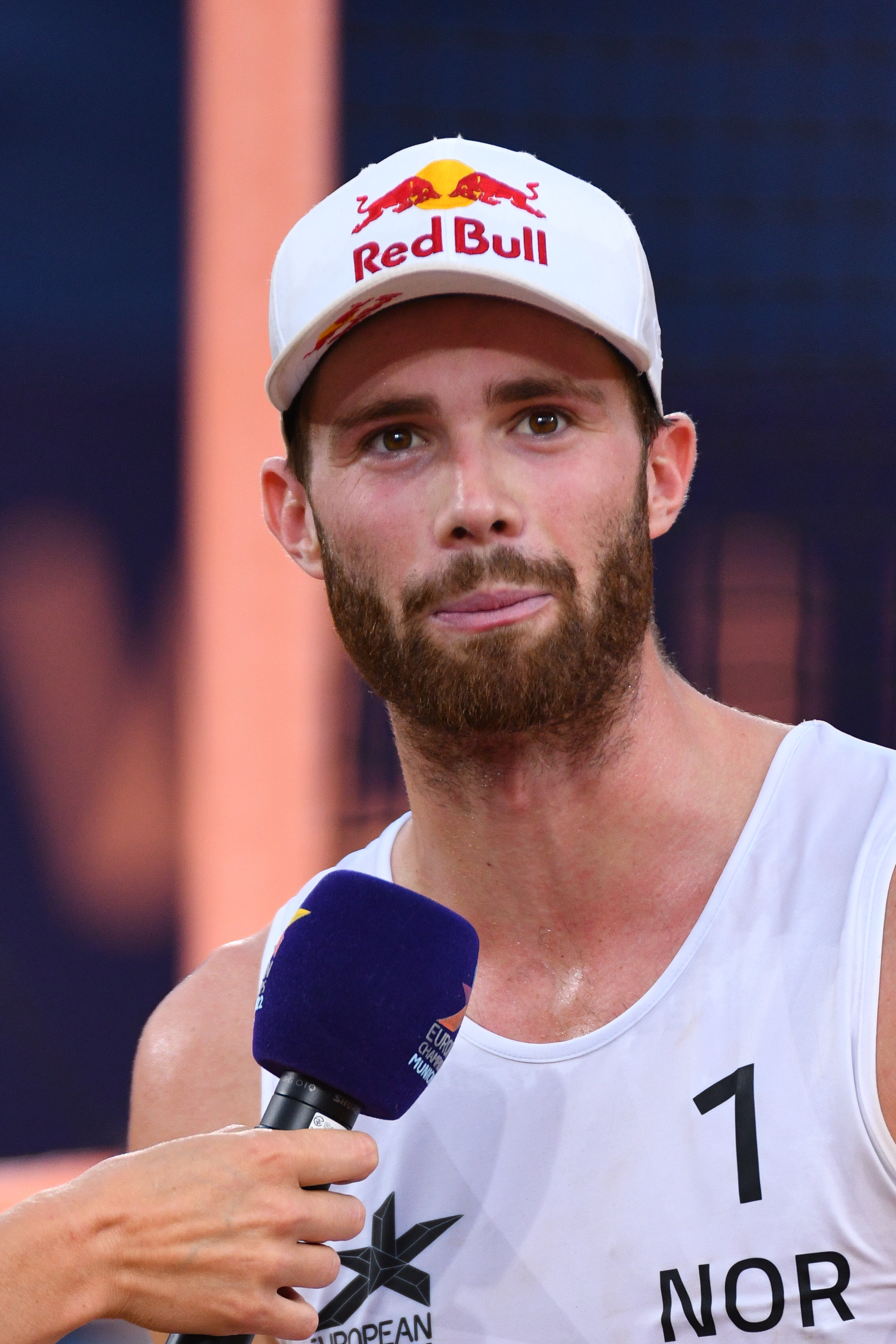
- Mol in 2022

Personal information
- Full name: Anders Berntsen Mol
- Nationality: Norwegian
- Born: 2 July 1997 (age 29); Stord Municipality, Norway
- Height: 2.00 m (6 ft 7 in)
- Weight: 90 kg (198 lb)

Beach volleyball information

Current teammate
| Years | Teammate |
|---|---|
| 2016– | Christian Sørum |

Previous teammates
| Years | Teammate |
|---|---|
| 2014–2016 | Mathias Berntsen |
Honours
Men's beach volleyball
Representing Norway
Olympic Games
| Gold medal – first place | 2020 Tokyo | Beach |
| Bronze medal – third place | 2024 Paris | Beach |
World Championships
| Gold medal – first place | 2022 Rome | Beach |
| Bronze medal – third place | 2019 Hamburg | Beach |
Volleyball World Beach Pro Tour
| Gold medal – first place | 2026 | Montreal Elite 16 |
| Gold medal – first place | 2026 | Saquarema Elite 16 |
| Gold medal – first place | 2025 | Hamburg Elite 16 |
| Gold medal – first place | 2025 | Montreal Elite 16 |
| Gold medal – first place | 2025 | Saquarema Elite 16 |
| Gold medal – first place | 2024 | Doha The Finals |
| Gold medal – first place | 2024 | João Pessoa Elite 16 |
| Gold medal – first place | 2024 | Hamburg Elite 16 |
| Gold medal – first place | 2024 | Vienna Elite 16 |
| Gold medal – first place | 2023 | Montreal Elite 16 |
| Gold medal – first place | 2023 | Ostrava Elite 16 |
| Gold medal – first place | 2023 | Doha Elite 16 |
| Gold medal – first place | 2022 | Doha The Finals |
| Gold medal – first place | 2022 | Cape Town Elite 16 |
| Gold medal – first place | 2022 | Paris Elite 16 |
| Gold medal – first place | 2022 | Ostrava Elite 16 |
| Silver medal – second place | 2026 | Hamburg Elite 16 |
| Silver medal – second place | 2025 | Ostrava Elite 16 |
| Silver medal – second place | 2023 | Doha The Finals |
| Silver medal – second place | 2023 | Gstaad Elite 16 |
| Silver medal – second place | 2023 | Uberlândia Elite 16 |
| Silver medal – second place | 2023 | Tepic Elite 16 |
| Bronze medal – third place | 2025 | Brasília Elite 16 |
| Bronze medal – third place | 2024 | Gstaad Elite 16 |
| Bronze medal – third place | 2024 | Doha Elite 16 |
| Bronze medal – third place | 2023 | Hamburg Elite 16 |
| Bronze medal – third place | 2022 | Uberlândia Elite 16 |
| Bronze medal – third place | 2022 | Rosarito Elite 16 |
FIVB Beach Volleyball World Tour
| Gold medal – first place | 2021 | Cagliari Tour Final |
| Gold medal – first place | 2021 | Cancún 2 |
| Gold medal – first place | 2021 | Cancún 1 |
| Gold medal – first place | 2019 | Oslo |
| Gold medal – first place | 2019 | Vienna |
| Gold medal – first place | 2019 | Tokyo |
| Gold medal – first place | 2019 | Gstaad |
| Gold medal – first place | 2019 | Ostrava |
| Gold medal – first place | 2019 | Jinjang |
| Gold medal – first place | 2019 | Itapema |
| Gold medal – first place | 2018 | Las Vegas |
| Gold medal – first place | 2018 | Hamburg Tour Final |
| Gold medal – first place | 2018 | Vienna |
| Gold medal – first place | 2018 | Gstaad |
| Silver medal – second place | 2019 | Warsaw |
| Silver medal – second place | 2018 | Itapema |
| Bronze medal – third place | 2019 | Rome Tour Final |
| Bronze medal – third place | 2018 | Baden |
| Bronze medal – third place | 2017 | Espinho |
European Championship
| Gold medal – first place | 2025 Düsseldorf | Beach |
| Gold medal – first place | 2021 Vienna | Beach |
| Gold medal – first place | 2020 Jurmala | Beach |
| Gold medal – first place | 2019 Moscow | Beach |
| Gold medal – first place | 2018 Netherlands | Beach |
| Silver medal – second place | 2026 Stare Jabłonki | Beach |
| Bronze medal – third place | 2022 Munich | Beach |

Anders Berntsen Mol (born 2 July 1997) is a Norwegian beach volleyball player. He won the gold medal at the 2020 Olympics in Tokyo.

== Beach career ==
Mol learned to play beach volleyball as a teenager. His parents introduced him to the sport. Together with Martin Olimstad he competed at the U18 European Championships in Molodetscho. Together with his cousin Mathias Berntsen, Mol competed in multiple national and international tournaments between 2014 and 2017. Berntsen/ Mol won the U20 European Championships 2015 in Larnaka and were U22 Vice European Champions in 2017. Further highlights of the two cousins was a 9th place at a 5-star- event of the world series in Porec and a third place at a 2-star-event in Espinho. 2016 Mol again won the U20 European Championship in Antalya together with Alexander Sorum. Since end of 2016 Mol plays together with Alexanders brother, Christian Sorum, who previously played with Anders own brother, Hendrik. Together with Christian, Mol landed a 5th place at the FIVB-Major in Klagenfurt and won the U22 European Championship in Thessaloniki. 2017 Mol/ Sorum landed a 9th place at the FIVB 5 star tournament in Gstaad, won the CEV Masters in Ljubljana and landed a 5th place at the European Championship in Jurmala. Besides, Mol was “best Newcomer” on the world tour 2017. 2018 Mol/ Sorum landed in 5th place at the 4-star tournament in Den Haag. There followed many more top 10 placings, including a 5th place in Xiamen, a second place in Itapema, a 5th place in Espinho and the win in Gstaad. In July, Mol/ Sorum became European Champions in the Netherlands. Then they also won the 5-star tournament in Vienna and climbed to the top of the world ranking after winning 19 times in a row. They even won the World Tour Final in Hamburg. With that win the duo landed their forth FIVB World Tour gold medal in a row and earned them the highest ever prize money in the history of beach volleyball, taking home 150,000 $ in total. Mol finished the 2018/2017 season with four FIVB awards, Best Blocker, Best Offensive Player, Most Outstanding Player and Most Improved.

The duo was also dominating the world tour season 2018/19. They won 4-star tournaments in Las Vegas, Itapema, Jinjiang, Ostrava und landed a second place in Warsaw. At the world championship in Hamburg they lost in the semifinal against the German team Thole/ Wickler landed a third place in the end. The following tournaments in Gstaad, Tokyo, and Vienna they claimed gold. At the European Championship in Moscow Mol/Sorum defended their title. At the World Tour Finals in Rome Mol/Sorum won a bronze medal. Mol finished the 2019/2018 year with another four FIVB awards, Best Blocker, Best Setter, Best Attacker and Most Outstanding Player. Mol/Sorum also won the FIVB Most Outstanding Team.

In 2020, Mol/Sorum once again defended their European Championship title winning gold in Jurmala, Latvia. This win made them the third team in history to win a European Championship three years in a row. At 23 and 24, respectively they are the youngest team to achieve this feat.

At the 2020 Tokyo Olympics, the pair won gold medals, beating Russians Viacheslav Krasilnikov and Oleg Stoyanovskiy in the finals. The pairing of Anders Mol and Christian Sorum defeated the Russian Olympic Committee's Viachelslav Krasilnikov and Oleg Stoyanovskiy in straight sets, 21-17, 21-18. Both sets were tightly contested, through Norway rarely relinquished control.

They won gold at the 2021 European Championship in Vienna, becoming the first team to win it four times and the first team to win four consecutive times.

== Indoor career ==
In 2016, Mol also played indoors in the Norwegian U20 national team as an outside hitter. In the 2016/17 season he became Belgian vice champion and also played in the Champions League.

In 2019 Mol signed a temporary contract with the club Førde volleyballKlubb. In 2020 he won the Norwegian Championship with the club before going back to beach volleyball.

On 3 August 2026, Mol announced that he will join Rana Verona in the Italian SuperLega Credem Banca during the 2026-2027 season, but he stays committed to his goal of winning a medal at the beach volleyball competition at the 2028 Olympic Games in Los Angeles with his long time partner, Christian Sørum.

== Personal life ==
Mols parents Merita Berntsen and Kåre Mol are former Volleyball/ Beach Volleyball Champions and now coaches. His four siblings are also active in volleyball and beach volleyball today. One of his brothers, Hendrik Mol, initially played with Anders' future partner Christian Sorum. The Mol brothers and Sorum brothers met while they all attended the volleyball-focused educational program ToppVolley Norge at Sauda Videregående, in Ryfylke.

Sporting positions
| Preceded by Evandro Oliveira and André Stein (BRA) | Men's FIVB Beach Volley World Tour Winner alongside (Norway) Christian Sørum; 2018; 2019 | Succeeded by Cherif Younousse and Ahmed Tijan (QAT) |
Awards
| Preceded by Gustavo Carvalhaes (BRA) | Men's FIVB World Tour "Top Rookie"; 2017 | Succeeded by Igor Velichko (RUS) |
| Preceded by Phil Dalhausser (USA) | Men's FIVB World Tour "Best Blocker"; 2018; 2019 | Succeeded by Discontinued |
| Preceded by Phil Dalhausser (USA) | Men's FIVB World Tour "Best Offensive Player"; 2018; 2019 | Succeeded by Discontinued |
| Preceded by Sam Pedlow (CAN) | Men's FIVB World Tour "Most Improved Player"; 2018 | Succeeded by Discontinued |
| Preceded by Phil Dalhausser (USA) | Men's FIVB World Tour "Most Outstanding Player"; 2018; 2019 | Succeeded by Discontinued |
| Preceded by Evandro Oliveira and André Stein (BRA) | Men's FIVB World Tour "Team of the Year" alongside (Norway) Christian Sørum; 2018; 2019 | Succeeded by Discontinued |
| Preceded by Jānis Šmēdiņš (LAT) | Men's FIVB World Tour "Best Setter"; 2019 | Succeeded by Discontinued |
