= 2019 European Beach Volleyball Championships =

International beach volleyball competition

2019 European Championships
- Venue: Luzhniki Stadium
- Location: Moscow, Russia
- Dates: 5–11 August 2019

The 2019 European Beach Volleyball Championship were held in Moscow, Russia from 5–11 August 2019.
