= Francesca Alupei =

Romanian volleyball player (born 2003)

Personal information
- Full name: Francesca Ioana Alupei
- Nationality: Romanian
- Born: 3 January 2003 (age 23); Romania
- Hometown: Bucharest
- Height: 1.91 m (6 ft 3 in)

Volleyball information
- Position: Middle blocker
- Current club: CSM Alba Blaj
- Number: 15

Career
Years	Teams
2019–	CSM Alba Blaj

Francesca Ioana Alupei (born 3 January 2003) is a Romanian volleyball player who plays for CSM Alba Blaj.

She competed at the 2018 Girls' U17 Volleyball European Championship, where the Romanian team placed fifth. She also competed at the 2017 Girls' U16 Volleyball European Championship, where Romania ranked seventh.

== Achievements ==
- Divizia A1:
  - Winner (1): 2018

== Personal life ==
She is the daughter of Angela Alupei and Dorin Alupei.
