= Anastasija Samoilova =

Latvian beach volleyball player

Anastasija Ana Samoilova
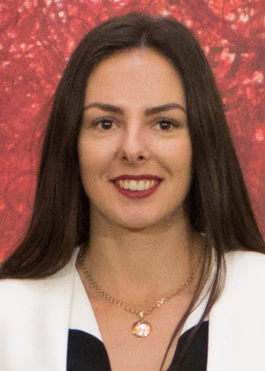
- Kravčenoka in 2019

Personal information
- Born: January 19, 1997 (age 29); Daugavpils, Latvia

Beach volleyball information

Current teammate
Years	Teammate
2016–present	Tīna Graudiņa
Honours
Women's beach volleyball
Representing Latvia
World Championships
Gold medal – first place	2025 Adelaide	Beach
European Championships
Gold medal – first place	2019 Moscow	Beach
Gold medal – first place	2022 Munich	Beach
Bronze medal – third place	2026 Stare Jabłonki	Beach

Anastasija Samoilova (née Kravčenoka) (born 19 January 1997) is a Latvian women beach volleyball player. She represented Latvia at the 2020 Summer Olympics, where she and her partner Tīna Graudiņa achieved 4th place at the XXXII Summer Olympics in Tokyo. Kravčenoka and Graudiņa were the first Latvian women's pair to qualify for the Olympics. In 2024, she and Graudiņa secured 5th place at the XXXIII Summer Olympics in Paris.

She participated in the 2013 European U18 Beach Volleyball Championship, with Tīna Graudiņa, the 2015 European U20 Beach Volleyball Championship, with Tereze Hrapane, the 2016 European U20 Beach Volleyball Championship, and the 2016 European U22 Beach Volleyball Championships, with Tīna Graudiņa, winning a gold medal.

Later she participated in the 2017 FIVB Beach Volleyball World Tour, as well as in the 2019 European Beach Volleyball Championship, with Tīna Graudiņa, winning a gold medal. Kravčenoka married beach volleyball player Mihails Samoilovs, the younger brother of Aleksandrs Samoilovs, on September 2, 2022, and has been known as Samoilova since then.
