= Tīna Graudiņa =

Latvian beach volleyball player

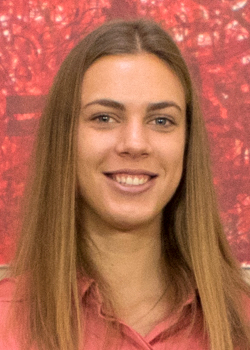
- Graudina in 2019

Personal information
- Full name: Tīna Laura Graudiņa
- Born: 9 March 1998 (age 28) Riga, Latvia
Beach volleyball information
Current teammate
- Years: Teammate
- 2016–present: Anastasija Kravčenoka
Honours
Women's beach volleyball
Representing Latvia
World Championships
Gold medal – first place	2025 Adelaide	Beach
European Championships
Gold medal – first place	2019 Moscow	Beach
Gold medal – first place	2022 Munich	Beach
Bronze medal – third place	2026 Stare Jabłonki	Beach

Tīna Laura Graudiņa (born 9 March 1998) is a Latvian beach volleyball player. She represented Latvia at the 2020 Summer Olympics and at the 2024 Summer Olympics. Graudiņa and her partner Anastasija Kravčenoka were the first Latvian women's pair to qualify for the Olympics. She and Kravčenoka came in fourth at the Tokyo Olympics. Tīna Graudiņa was also named the best all-around scorer at the Tokyo Olympics.

Graudiņa won the 2019 European Championship, and earned gold at the 2016 U22 European Championship with partner Anastasija Kravčenoka. In 2018 she also won silver at the U22 European Championship and was named FIVB Rookie of the Year.

Previously, Graudiņa won gold at the 2015 U18 European Championship with partner Paula Neciporuka.

Tīna Graudiņa played for the University of Southern California (USC). In her career at USC, she had many accomplishments:

- 2021 and 2022 NCAA women's beach volleyball championships
- 2019 National Player of the Year
- All-American first team, in 2018, 2019 and 2021
- 91–8 career record (31–2 in 2018, 33–2 in 2019, 27–4 in 2021)

== Personal life ==
Graudiņa's grandfather Artūrs Graudiņš and her grandmother Staņislava Spruženiece were both Latvian high jump champions.

Olympic Games
Preceded by Jeļena Ostapenko; Agnis Čavars	Flagbearer for Latvia; Paris 2024; With: Nauris Miezis	Succeeded by Incumbent
