= Ana Patrícia =

Brazilian beach volleyball player (born 1997)

Personal information
- Full name: Ana Patrícia Silva Ramos
- Born: 29 September 1997 (age 29) Espinosa, Minas Gerais, Brazil
- Height: 1.94 m (6 ft 4 in)
- Weight: 84 kg (185 lb)
Beach volleyball information
Current teammate
- Years: Teammate
- 2022–present: Eduarda "Duda" Lisboa
Previous teammates
- Years: Teammate
- 2014 2017–2021: Eduarda "Duda" Lisboa; Rebecca Cavalcante
Honours
Women's beach volleyball
Representing Brazil
Olympic Games
Gold medal – first place	2024 Paris	Beach
World Championships
Gold medal – first place	2022 Rome	Beach
Silver medal – second place	2023 Tlaxcala	Beach
Pan American Games
Gold medal – first place	2023 Santiago	Beach
Youth Olympic Games
Gold medal – first place	2014 Nanjing	Beach
U21 World Championships
Gold medal – first place	2016 Lucerne	Beach
Gold medal – first place	2017 Nanjing	Beach

Ana Patrícia Silva Ramos (born 29 September 1997) is a Brazilian beach volleyball player. She competed for Brazil with Rebecca Cavalcante in women's beach volleyball at the 2020 Summer Olympics and won the gold medal at 2024 Games, alongside Eduarda "Duda" Lisboa.

Ramos was also a gold medalist at the 2014 Summer Youth Olympics.
