= Duda Lisboa =

Brazilian beach volleyball player (born 1998)

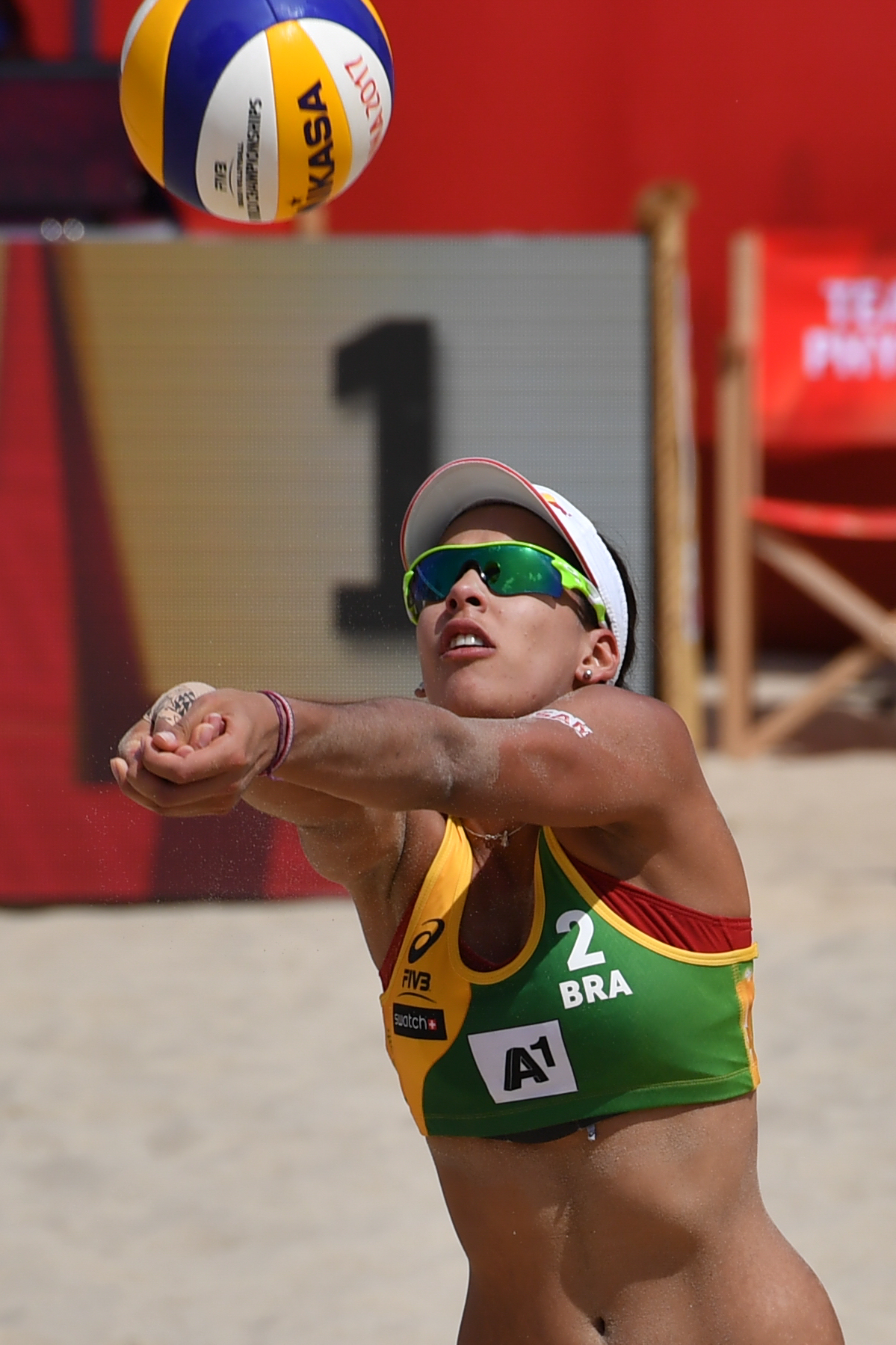
- Lisboa at the 2017 World Championships

Personal information
- Full name: Eduarda dos Santos Lisboa
- Nickname: Duda
- Born: 1 August 1998 (age 28) Aracaju, Sergipe, Brazil
- Height: 1.80 m (5 ft 11 in)
- Weight: 70 kg (154 lb)
Beach volleyball information
Current teammate
- Years: Teammate
- 2022–present: Ana Patrícia Ramos
Previous teammates
- Years: Teammate
- 2012; 2013–2014; 2013–2014; 2014; 2014; 2014–2015; 2015–2016; 2017–2021: Drussyla Costa; Thais Ferreira; Tainá Silva Bigi; Andressa Ramalho; Ana Patrícia Ramos; Carolina Horta Máximo; Elize Maia; Ágatha Bednarczuk
Medal record
Women's beach volleyball
Representing Brazil
Olympic Games
Gold medal – first place	2024 Paris	Beach
World Championships
Gold medal – first place	2022 Rome	Beach
Silver medal – second place	2023 Tlaxcala	Beach
Pan American Games
Gold medal – first place	2023 Santiago	Beach
Youth Olympic Games
Gold medal – first place	2014 Nanjing	Beach
U21 World Championships
Gold medal – first place	2016 Lucerne	Beach
Gold medal – first place	2017 Nanjing	Beach
U19 World Championships
Gold medal – first place	2013 Porto	Beach
Gold medal – first place	2014 Porto	Beach
Gold medal – first place	2016 Larnaca	Beach

Eduarda "Duda" dos Santos Lisboa (Brazilian Portuguese pronunciation: [eduˈaʁdɐ ˈdudɐ dus ˈsɐ̃tus lizˈboɐ]; born 1 August 1998) is a Brazilian beach volleyball player. She is the gold medalist at the 2024 Summer Olympics. She is also a two-time U21 World champion (2016, 2017) and three-time U19 World champion (2013, 2014, 2016). She has won four World Tour events and reached thirteen podiums in the World Tour throughout her career. She was voted the FIVB Top Rookie in 2016. She was also a gold medalist at the 2014 Summer Youth Olympics.

Lisboa plays as a right-side defender.

Awards
Preceded by Taru Lahti (FIN)	Women's FIVB World Tour "Top Rookie"; 2016	Succeeded by Sara Hughes (USA)
