= Brandy (disambiguation) =

Brandy is an alcoholic beverage made by wine distillation.

Brandy may also refer to:

== Geography ==
=== United Kingdom ===
- Brandy Carr, a village in the city of Wakefield in West Yorkshire, England
- Brandy Hill, Wales

=== United States ===
- Brandy City, California, an unincorporated community
- Brandy Peak, Oregon
- Brandy Pond, a small lake in Naples, Maine

=== Antarctica ===
- Brandy Bay, Graham Land

== People and fictional characters ==
- Brandy (given name), a feminine name and unisex nickname, including lists of women, men and fictional characters
- Brandy (surname), including a list of people

== Music ==
- Brandy Norwood (born 1979), American singer known professionally as Brandy
  - Brandy (album), an album by Brandy Norwood
- "Brandy" (Scott English song), a 1971 song, covered under the title "Mandy" in 1975 by Barry Manilow
- "Brandy (You're a Fine Girl)", a 1972 song by Looking Glass
- "Brandy", a song by Joseph B. Jefferson and Charles B. Simmons performed by The O'Jays on their 1978 album So Full of Love

== Other uses ==
- Brandy, a GPL clone of the programming language BBC BASIC
- Brandy v Human Rights and Equal Opportunity Commission, an Australian High Court case
- Brandy (film), a 1963 Spanish western
- Brandy: Special Delivery, a 2002 American reality series

== See also ==
- Brandys (disambiguation)
- Brandi, a given name or surname
