= 2023 Volleyball World Beach Pro Tour =

International beach volleyball competition

Tournament details
- Host country: Various
- Dates: 1 February – 9 December 2023

The 2023 Volleyball World Beach Pro Tour was the second edition of the global elite professional beach volleyball circuit organized by the Fédération Internationale de Volleyball (FIVB) for the 2023 beach volleyball season. Since March 2022, the Tour comprises three tiers: Future, Challenge and Elite 16. The season ends with The Finals featuring the 10 best teams in the world.

The Volleyball World Beach Pro Tour was established by FIVB in October 2021, thus it replaced the former FIVB Beach Volleyball World Tour.

== Schedule ==
Key

World Championships
Beach Pro Tour Finals
Elite 16
Challenge
Future

=== Men ===
Tournament	Champions	Runners-up	Third place	Fourth place
Doha Elite 16; Doha, Qatar; US$150,000; 1–5 February 2023	Anders Mol (NOR); Christian Sørum (NOR); 21–19, 21–19	David Åhman (SWE); Jonatan Hellvig (SWE)	Alex Ranghieri (ITA); Adrian Carambula (ITA); 22–20, 22–20	Bartosz Łosiak (POL); Michał Bryl (POL)
La Paz Challenge; La Paz, Mexico; US$75,000; 16–19 March 2023	Pablo Herrera (ESP); Adrián Gavira (ESP); 21–17, 15–21, 15–12	Stefan Boermans (NED); Yorick de Groot (NED)	Robin Seidl (AUT); Moritz Pristauz (AUT); 21–16, 26–24	Evandro Oliveira (BRA); Arthur Lanci (BRA)
Mt. Maunganui Beach Future; Mount Maunganui, New Zealand; US$5,000; 16–19 March 2023	Abuduhalikejiang Mutailipu (CHN); Wu Jiaxin (CHN); 21–17, 21–13	Sam O'Dea (NZL); Ben O'Dea (NZL)	David McKienzie (USA); Benjamin Vaught (USA); 21–14, 21–11	Thomas Hartles (NZL); Thomas Heijs (NZL)
Tepic Elite 16; Tepic, Mexico; US$150,000; 22–26 March 2023	David Åhman (SWE); Jonatan Hellvig (SWE); 21–16, 21–15	Anders Mol (NOR); Christian Sørum (NOR)	Clemens Wickler (GER); Nils Ehlers (GER); 24–22, 21–16	Stefan Boermans (NED); Yorick de Groot (NED)
Coolangatta Beach Future; Coolangatta, Australia; US$5,000; 28 March–2 April 2023	Abuduhalikejiang Mutailipu (CHN); Wu Jiaxin (CHN); 21–9, 25–23	Pithak Tipjan (THA); Poravid Taovato (THA)	Jordan Hoppe (USA); Charles Siragusa (USA); 18–21, 21–14, 15–12	Simon Kulzer (GER); Bennet Poniewaz (GER)
Tahiti Future; Papeete, French Polynesia; US$5,000; 5–9 April 2023	Tiziano Andreatta (ITA); Andrea Abbiati (ITA); 21–13, 21–13	Kensuke Shōji (JPN); Jumpei Ikeda (JPN)	Simon Kulzer (GER); Bennet Poniewaz (GER); 21–16, 21–14	Jake Urrutia (USA); Ian Satterfield (USA)
Itapema Challenge; Itapema, Brazil; US$75,000; 6–9 April 2023	George Wanderley (BRA); André Stein (BRA); 21–16, 21–13	Youssef Krou (FRA); Arnaud Gauthier-Rat (FRA)	Hendrik Mol (NOR); Mathias Berntsen (NOR); 21–19, 21–17	Noslen Díaz (CUB); Jorge Alayo (CUB)
Saquarema Challenge; Saquarema, Brazil; US$75,000; 13–16 April 2023	Evandro Oliveira (BRA); Arthur Lanci (BRA); 18–21, 21–12, 15–13	Chase Budinger (USA); Miles Evans (USA)	Julian Hörl (AUT); Alexander Horst (AUT); 14–21, 21–15, 15–10	Miles Partain (USA); Andrew Benesh (USA)
Satun Future; Pak Nam, Thailand; US$5,000; 20–23 April 2023	Philipp Huster (GER); Simon Pfretzschner (GER); 18–21, 21–17, 15–13	Paul Henning (GER); Sven Winter (GER)	Samuel Cattet (FRA); Olivier Barthélémy (FRA); 16–21, 21–16, 17–15	Dmitriy Yakovlev (KAZ); Sergey Bogatu (KAZ)
Uberlândia Elite 16; Uberlândia, Brazil; US$150,000; 26–30 April 2023	Ondřej Perušič (CZE); David Schweiner (CZE); 21–19, 15–21, 15–11	Anders Mol (NOR); Christian Sørum (NOR)	Bartosz Łosiak (POL); Michał Bryl (POL); 21–19, 21–23, 15–9	Steven van de Velde (NED); Matthew Immers (NED)
Madrid Future; Madrid, Spain; US$5,000; 11–14 May 2023	Javier Huerta (ESP); Alejandro Huerta (ESP); 17–21, 21–16, 15–9	Paul Henning (GER); Sven Winter (GER)	Li Jie (CHN); Wang Yanwei (CHN); 21–18, 21–16	Maximilian Just (GER); Lui Wüst (GER)
Ostrava Elite 16; Ostrava, Czech Republic; US$150,000; 31 May–4 June 2023	Anders Mol (NOR); Christian Sørum (NOR); 21–15, 19–21, 15–12	Cherif Younousse (QAT); Ahmed Tijan (QAT)	Miles Partain (USA); Andrew Benesh (USA); 21–14, 21–17	Ondřej Perušič (CZE); David Schweiner (CZE)
Lecce Future; Lecce, Italy; US$5,000; 8–11 June 2023	Davide Benzi (ITA); Carlo Bonifazi (ITA); 21–15, 21–16	Kryštof Jan Oliva (CZE); Tadeáš Trousil (CZE)	Abuduhalikejiang Mutailipu (CHN); Wu Jiaxin (CHN); 21–17, 21–19	Gianluca Dal Corso (ITA); Marco Viscovich (ITA)
Spiez Future; Spiez, Switzerland; US$5,000; 8–11 June 2023	Marco Krattiger (SUI); Florian Breer (SUI); 21–16, 21–19	Quentin Métral (SUI); Yves Haussener (SUI)	Piotr Janiak (POL); Jędrzej Brożyniak (POL); 21–14, 21–15	Santeri Sirén (FIN); Jyrki Nurminen (FIN)
Jurmala Challenge; Jūrmala, Latvia; US$75,000; 15–18 June 2023	Thomas Hodges (AUS); Zachery Schubert (AUS); 10–21, 21–16, 15–12	George Wanderley (BRA); André Stein (BRA)	Vitor Felipe (BRA); Renato Carvalho (BRA); 21–15, 16–21, 15–13	Evandro Oliveira (BRA); Arthur Lanci (BRA)
Lille Future; Lille, France; US$5,000; 15–18 June 2023	Elouan Chouikh-Barbez (FRA); Tom Altwies (FRA); 21–17, 21–19	Louis Vandecaveye (BEL); Gilles Vandecaveye (BEL)	Youssef Krou (FRA); Arnaud Gauthier-Rat (FRA); 21–14, 21–15	Jonas Sagstetter (GER); Benedikt Sagstetter (GER)
Ios Island Future; Ios, Greece; US$5,000; 21–24 June 2023	Markus Mol (NOR); Jo Sunde (NOR); 21–17, 27–25	Florian Schnetzer (AUT); Lorenz Petutschnig (AUT)	Panagiotis Ioannidis (GRE); Thodoris Papadimitriou (GRE); 21–18, 14–21, 15–13	Bautista Amieva (ARG); Leo Aveiro (ARG)
Helsinki Future; Helsinki, Finland; US$5,000; 29 June–2 July 2023	Evan Cory (USA); Troy Field (USA); 21–14, 21–12	Mathias Seiser (AUT); Laurenc Grössig (AUT)	Markus Mol (NOR); Jo Sunde (NOR); 21–15, 19–21, 15–12	Timo Hammarberg (AUT); Tim Berger (AUT)
Messina Future; Messina, Italy; US$5,000; 29 June–2 July 2023	Bautista Amieva (ARG); Leo Aveiro (ARG); 21–15, 17–21, 15–8	Florian Schnetzer (AUT); Lorenz Petutschnig (AUT)	Gianluca Dal Corso (ITA); Marco Viscovich (ITA); 21–0, 21–0	Davide Benzi (ITA); Carlo Bonifazi (ITA)
Gstaad Elite 16; Gstaad, Switzerland; US$150,000; 5–9 July 2023	Miles Partain (USA); Andrew Benesh (USA); 15–21, 21–11, 18–16	Anders Mol (NOR); Christian Sørum (NOR)	Michał Bryl (POL); Bartosz Łosiak (POL); 21–18, 11–7, ret.	George Wanderley (BRA); André Stein (BRA)
Espinho Challenge; Espinho, Portugal; US$75,000; 13–16 July 2023	Trevor Crabb (USA); Theo Brunner (USA); 21–16, 21–17	Julian Hörl (AUT); Alexander Horst (AUT)	Evandro Oliveira (BRA); Arthur Lanci (BRA); 18–21, 21–18, 15–13	Piotr Kantor (POL); Jakub Zdybek (POL)
Leuven Future; Leuven, Belgium; US$5,000; 13–16 July 2023	Immanuel Zürcher (SUI); Jonathan Jordan (SUI); 21–18, 21–18	Mees Sengers (NED); Dirk Boehlé (NED)	Adrian Heidrich (SUI); Leo Dillier (SUI); 11–21, 21–16, 15–7	Louis Vandecaveye (BEL); Gilles Vandecaveye (BEL)
Edmonton Challenge; Edmonton, Canada; US$75,000; 20–23 July 2023	João Pedrosa (POR); Hugo Campos (POR); 21–16, 21–18	Hendrik Mol (NOR); Mathias Berntsen (NOR)	Samuele Cottafava (ITA); Paolo Nicolai (ITA); 21–19, 21–19	Pedro Solberg (BRA); Gustavo Carvalhaes (BRA)
Montreal Elite 16; Montreal, Canada; US$150,000; 26–30 July 2023	Anders Mol (NOR); Christian Sørum (NOR); 21–17, 15–21, 15–10	Miles Partain (USA); Andrew Benesh (USA)	Alex Ranghieri (ITA); Adrian Carambula (ITA); 24–22, 22–20	Evandro Oliveira (BRA); Arthur Lanci (BRA)
Warsaw Future I Warsaw, Poland; US$5,000; 10–13 August 2023	Mārtiņš Pļaviņš (LAT); Kristians Fokerots (LAT); 26–24, 21–16	Jędrzej Brożyniak (POL); Piotr Janiak (POL)	Olivers Bulgačs (LAT); Edgars Točs (LAT); 21–18, 19–21, 15–12	Artūr Vasiljev (LTU); Robert Juchnevič (LTU)
Wenzhou Future; Wenzhou, China; US$5,000; 10–13 August 2023	Wu Jiaxin (CHN); Abuduhalikejiang Mutailipu (CHN); 21–15, 21–17	Alani Nicklin (NZL); Bradley Fuller (NZL)	Abbas Pourasgari (IRI); Alireza Aghajani (IRI); 21–18, 21–19	Wang Yanwei (CHN); Li Jie (CHN)
Hamburg Elite 16; Hamburg, Germany; US$150,000; 16–20 August 2023	David Åhman (SWE); Jonatan Hellvig (SWE); 21–16, 22–24, 21–19	Samuele Cottafava (ITA); Paolo Nicolai (ITA)	Anders Mol (NOR); Christian Sørum (NOR); 21–19, 21–16	George Wanderley (BRA); André Stein (BRA)
Bujumbura Future; Bujumbura, Burundi; US$5,000; 17–20 August 2023	Richard Peemüller (GER); Tilo Rietschel (GER); 21–13, 12–21, 15–11	Kevin Cuzmiciov (ISR); River Day (ISR)	Juan Enrique Bello (ENG); Josue Rocha (ENG); 21–0, 21–0	Martin Appelgren (SWE); Alexander Annerstedt (SWE)
Qidong Future; Qidong, China; US$5,000; 17–20 August 2023	Wang Yanwei (CHN); Li Jie (CHN); 21–19, 21–14	Thomas Reid (NZL); John McManaway (NZL)	Yusuke Ishijima (JPN); Takumi Takahashi (JPN); 21–8, 21–18	Qin Chengda (CHN); Chen Xiufeng (CHN)
El Alamein Future; El Alamein, Egypt; US$5,000; 23–26 August 2023	Paul Pascariuc (AUT); Laurenz Leitner (AUT); 21–18, 18–21, 15–8	Robin Sowa (GER); Lukas Pfretzschner (GER)	Mārtiņš Pļaviņš (LAT); Kristians Fokerots (LAT); 21–19, 21–17	Dirk Boehlé (NED); Mees Sengers (NED)
Baden Future; Baden, Austria; US$5,000; 23–27 August 2023	Martin Ermacora (AUT); Philipp Waller (AUT); 21–14, 21–16	Timo Hammarberg (AUT); Alexander Horst (AUT)	Jonas Sagstetter (GER); Benedikt Sagstetter (GER); 23–25, 24–22, 15–13	Hagen Smith (USA); Logan Webber (USA)
Brno Future; Brno, Czech Republic; US$5,000; 24–27 August 2023	Markus Mol (NOR); Jo Sunde (NOR); 21–17, 21–18	Václav Berčík (CZE); Matyas Džavoronok (CZE)	Momme Lorenz (GER); Eric Stadie (GER); 21–18, 20–22, 15–13	Jan Dumek (CZE); Jiří Sedlák (CZE)
Montpellier Future; Montpellier, France; US$5,000; 30 August–3 September 2023	Arthur Canet (FRA); Téo Rotar (FRA); 21–16, 21–15	Rémi Bassereau (FRA); Arnaud Gauthier-Rat (FRA)	Calvin Ayé (FRA); Quincy Ayé (FRA); 21–19, 21–17	Samuel Cattet (FRA); Olivier Barthélémy (FRA)
Corigliano-Rossano Future; Corigliano-Rossano, Italy; US$5,000; 31 August–3 September 2023	Tobia Marchetto (ITA); Jakob Windisch (ITA); 21–15, 18–21, 15–13	Eylon Elazar (ISR); Kevin Cuzmiciov (ISR)	Gianluca Dal Corso (ITA); Marco Viscovich (ITA); 21–17, 21–19	Artúr Hajós (HUN); Bence Stréli (HUN)
Warsaw Future II; Warsaw, Poland; US$5,000; 31 August–3 September 2023	Markus Mol (NOR); Jo Sunde (NOR); 13–21, 21–15, 15–10	Ardis Bedrītis (LAT); Arturs Rinkēvičs (LAT)	Santeri Sirén (FIN); Jyrki Nurminen (FIN); 21–18, 21–15	Arnas Rumševičius (LTU); Tomas Staševičius (LTU)
Miguel Pereira Future; Miguel Pereira, Brazil; US$5,000; 7–10 September 2023	Leo Aveiro (ARG); Bautista Amieva (ARG); 19–21, 21–16, 15–11	Gabriel Dos Reis Santiago (BRA); Felipe Alves Pereira (BRA)	Heitor Benitto (BRA); Vinícius Rezende (BRA); 18–21, 21–19, 15–12	Adelmo Folha (BRA); Mateus Dultra (BRA)
Cervia Future; Cervia, Italy; US$5,000; 21–24 September 2023	Tobia Marchetto (ITA); Jakob Windisch (ITA); 21–14, 22–20	Artúr Hajós (HUN); Bence Stréli (HUN)	Ardis Bedrītis (LAT); Arturs Rinkēvičs (LAT); 21–11, 21–19	David Westphal (CZE); David Lenc (CZE)
Halifax Future; Halifax, Canada; US$5,000; 21–24 September 2023	Sam Schachter (CAN); Daniel Dearing (CAN); 21–17, 27–25	Hagen Smith (USA); Logan Webber (USA)	Jacob van Geel (CAN); Zach van Geel (CAN); 21–17, 16–21, 15–12	Zechariah Johnson (CAN); Jordan Deshane (CAN)
Paris Elite 16; Paris, France; US$150,000; 27 September–1 October 2023	Ondřej Perušič (CZE); David Schweiner (CZE); 16–21, 21–19, 15–11	Nils Ehlers (GER); Clemens Wickler (GER)	Alexander Brouwer (NED); Robert Meeuwsen (NED); 18–21, 21–18, 15–13	Julian Hörl (AUT); Alexander Horst (AUT)
World Championships; Tlaxcala, Mexico; US$500,000; 6–15 October 2023	Ondřej Perušič (CZE); David Schweiner (CZE); 21–15, 17–21, 15–13	David Åhman (SWE); Jonatan Hellvig (SWE)	Bartosz Łosiak (POL); Michał Bryl (POL); 21–17, 21–18	Trevor Crabb (USA); Theo Brunner (USA)
Goa Challenge; Goa, India; US$75,000; 19–22 October 2023	Robin Seidl (AUT); Moritz Pristauz (AUT); 18–21, 21–16, 17–15	Pablo Herrera (ESP); Adrián Gavira (ESP)	Javier Bello (ENG); Joaquin Bello (ENG) w/o	Lukas Pfretzschner (GER); Sven Winter (GER)
Mallorca Future; Palma Nova, Spain; US$5,000; 25–29 October 2023	Timo Hammarberg (AUT); Tim Berger (AUT); 21–18, 22–20	Aleksandrs Samoilovs (LAT); Mihails Samoilovs (LAT)	Arnas Rumševičius (LTU); Tomas Staševičius (LTU); 21–17, 19–21, 15–11	Javier Huerta (ESP); Alejandro Huerta (ESP)
Haikou Challenge; Haikou, China; US$75,000; 2–5 November 2023	Miles Evans (USA); Chase Budinger (USA); 21–14, 23–21	Trevor Crabb (USA); Theo Brunner (USA)	Thomas Hodges (AUS); Zachery Schubert (AUS); 21–15, 23–21	Chaim Schalk (USA); Tri Bourne (USA)
Chiang Mai Challenge; Chiang Mai, Thailand; US$75,000; 16–19 November 2023	Matthew Immers (NED); Steven van de Velde (NED); 21–16, 21–13	Piotr Kantor (POL); Jakub Zdybek (POL)	Miles Evans (USA); Chase Budinger (USA); 27–25, 21–23, 15–9	Mark Nicolaidis (AUS); Izac Carracher (AUS)
João Pessoa Elite 16; João Pessoa, Brazil; US$150,000; 22–26 November 2023	David Åhman (SWE); Jonatan Hellvig (SWE); 21–11, 21–18	Samuele Cottafava (ITA); Paolo Nicolai (ITA)	Stefan Boermans (NED); Yorick de Groot (NED); 21–15, 21–19	George Wanderley (BRA); André Stein (BRA)
Geelong Future; Geelong, Australia; US$5,000; 22–26 November 2023	Paul Burnett (AUS); Jack Pearse (AUS); 21–14, 21–13	Thomas Reid (NZL); John McManaway (NZL)	Hasan Hüseyin Mermer (TUR); Sefa Urlu (TUR); 21–15, 21–18	Garang Anyang (AUS); Justin Schumann (AUS)
Nuvali Challenge; Santa Rosa, Philippines; US$75,000; 30 November–3 December 2023	Robin Seidl (AUT); Moritz Pristauz (AUT); 21–18, 21–16	Thomas Hodges (AUS); Zachery Schubert (AUS)	Patrikas Stankevičius (LTU); Audrius Knašas (LTU); 23–21, 17–21, 15–10	Javier Bello (ENG); Joaquin Bello (ENG)
The Finals; Doha, Qatar; US$800,000; 6–9 December 2023	David Åhman (SWE); Jonatan Hellvig (SWE); 21–16, 21–17	Anders Mol (NOR); Christian Sørum (NOR)	George Wanderley (BRA); André Stein (BRA); 21–17, 21–17	Cherif Younousse (QAT); Ahmed Tijan (QAT)

=== Women ===
Tournament	Champions	Runners-up	Third place	Fourth place
Doha Elite 16; Doha, Qatar; US$150,000; 1–5 February 2023	Katja Stam (NED); Raïsa Schoon (NED); 20–22, 21–14, 15–11	Nina Brunner (SUI); Tanja Hüberli (SUI)	Taliqua Clancy (AUS); Mariafe Artacho del Solar (AUS); 12–21, 21–15, 15–10	Anastasija Samoilova (LAT); Tīna Graudiņa (LAT)
La Paz Challenge; La Paz, Mexico; US$75,000; 16–19 March 2023	Kristen Nuss (USA); Taryn Kloth (USA); 21–16, 21–13	Savannah Simo (USA); Toni Rodriguez (USA)	Tainá Silva (BRA); Victória Lopes (BRA); 21–17, 21–18	Dorina Klinger (AUT); Ronja Klinger (AUT)
Mt. Maunganui Beach Future; Mount Maunganui, New Zealand; US$5,000; 16–19 March 2023	Shaunna Polley (NZL); Alice Zeimann (NZL); 21–14, 21–12	Olivia MacDonald (NZL); Julia Tilley (NZL)	Shanice Marcelle (CAN); Lea Monkhouse (CAN); 21–16, 21–18	Darby Dunn (CAN); Olivia Furlan (CAN)
Tepic Elite 16; Tepic, Mexico; US$150,000; 22–26 March 2023	Sara Hughes (USA); Kelly Cheng (USA); 21–14, 15–21, 15–10	Eduarda Santos Lisboa (BRA); Ana Patrícia Ramos (BRA)	Taliqua Clancy (AUS); Mariafe Artacho del Solar (AUS); 16–21, 21–17, 19–17	Marta Menegatti (ITA); Valentina Gottardi (ITA)
Coolangatta Beach Future; Coolangatta, Australia; US$5,000; 28 March–2 April 2023	Jana Milutinovic (AUS); Stefanie Fejes (AUS); 22–20, 21–11	Georgia Johnson (AUS); Jasmine Fleming (AUS)	Majabelle Lawac (VAN); Sherysyn Toko (VAN); 24–22, 16–21, 15–6	Darby Dunn (CAN); Olivia Furlan (CAN)
Itapema Challenge; Itapema, Brazil; US$75,000; 6–9 April 2023	Xue Chen (CHN); Xia Xinyi (CHN); 21–18, 21–17	Carolina Solberg Salgado (BRA); Bárbara Seixas (BRA)	Terese Cannon (USA); Sarah Sponcil (USA); 21–16, 21–17	Esmée Böbner (SUI); Zoé Vergé-Dépré (SUI)
Saquarema Challenge; Saquarema, Brazil; US$75,000; 13–16 April 2023	Valentina Gottardi (ITA); Marta Menegatti (ITA); 18–21, 25–23, 15–11	Tainá Silva (BRA); Victória Lopes (BRA)	Andressa Cavalcanti (BRA); Vitória Rodrigues (BRA); 19–21, 21–12, 15–9	Monika Paulikienė (LIT); Ainė Raupelytė (LIT)
Satun Future; Pak Nam, Thailand; US$5,000; 20–23 April 2023	Nicole Laird (AUS); Brittany Kendall (AUS); 12–21, 21–14, 15–9	Ieva Vasiliauskaitė (LIT); Erika Kliokmanaitė (LIT)	Valerie Dvorníková (CZE); Anna Pospíšilová (CZE); 21–18, 21–19	Dhita Juliana (INA); Desi Ratnasari (INA)
Uberlândia Elite 16; Uberlândia, Brazil; US$150,000; 26–30 April 2023	Kristen Nuss (USA); Taryn Kloth (USA); 16–21, 24–22, 15–13	Mariafe Artacho del Solar (AUS); Taliqua Clancy (AUS)	Ana Patrícia Ramos (BRA); Eduarda Santos Lisboa (BRA); 21–16, 21–13	Sara Hughes (USA); Kelly Cheng (USA)
Madrid Future; Madrid, Spain; US$5,000; 18–21 May 2023	Liliana Fernández (ESP); Paula Soria (ESP); 17–21, 21–19, 16–14	Diana Lunina (UKR); Tetiana Lazarenko (UKR)	Muriel Bossart (SUI); Shana Zobrist (SUI); 21–16, 21–13	Wies Bekhuis (NED); Desy Poiesz (NED)
Ostrava Elite 16; Ostrava, Czech Republic; US$150,000; 31 May–4 June 2023	Ana Patrícia Ramos (BRA); Eduarda Santos Lisboa (BRA); 17–21, 21–14, 15–12	Terese Cannon (USA); Sarah Sponcil (USA)	Melissa Humana-Paredes (CAN); Brandie Wilkerson (CAN); 21–16, 21–14	Nina Brunner (SUI); Tanja Hüberli (SUI)
Lecce Future; Lecce, Italy; US$5,000; 8–11 June 2023	Margherita Bianchin (ITA); Claudia Scampoli (ITA); 19–21, 21–19, 15–10	Katarzyna Kociołek (POL); Marta Łodej (POL)	Maia Najul (ARG); Cecilia Peralta (ARG); 25–23, 21–17	Darby Dunn (CAN); Olivia Furlan (CAN)
Spiez Future; Spiez, Switzerland; US$5,000; 8–11 June 2023	Diana Lunina (UKR); Tetiana Lazarenko (UKR); 16–21, 21–9, 15–10	Michaela Břínková (CZE); Karin Žolnerčíková (CZE)	Georgia Johnson (AUS); Jasmine Fleming (AUS); 21–0, 21–0	Nele Schmitt (GER); Paula Schürholz (GER)
Jurmala Challenge; Jūrmala, Latvia; US$75,000; 15–18 June 2023	Melissa Humana-Paredes (CAN); Brandie Wilkerson (CAN); 21–17, 21–17	Esmée Böbner (SUI); Zoé Vergé (SUI)	Tīna Graudiņa (LAT); Anastasija Samoilova (LAT); 21–11, 20–22, 15–13	Tainá Silva (BRA); Victória Lopes (BRA)
Lille Future; Lille, France; US$5,000; 15–18 June 2023	Melanie Paul (GER); Hanna-Marie Schieder (GER); 18–21, 21–17, 18–16	Aline Chamereau (FRA); Clémence Vieira (FRA)	Anouk Dupin (FRA); Ophélie Lusson (FRA); 21–13, 21–13	Maia Najul (ARG); Cecilia Peralta (ARG)
Ios Island Future; Ios, Greece; US$5,000; 21–24 June 2023	Wies Bekhuis (NED); Desy Poiesz (NED); 21–19, 21–18	Franziska Friedl (AUT); Katharina Schützenhöfer (AUT)	Maia Najul (ARG); Cecilia Peralta (ARG); 21–18, 21–19	Clara Windeleff (DEN); Sofia Bisgaard (DEN)
Helsinki Future; Helsinki, Finland; US$5,000; 29 June–2 July 2023	Niina Ahtiainen (FIN); Taru Lahti-Liukkonen (FIN); 18–21, 21–9, 15–12	Georgia Johnson (AUS); Jasmine Fleming (AUS)	Katarzyna Kociołek (POL); Marta Łodej (POL); 21–14, 12–21, 15–12	Melanie Paul (GER); Hanna-Marie Schieder (GER)
Messina Future; Messina, Italy; US$5,000; 29 June–2 July 2023	Margherita Bianchin (ITA); Claudia Scampoli (ITA); 21–18, 21–18	Reka Orsi Toth (ITA); Giada Bianchi (ITA)	Menia Bentele (SUI); Anna Lutz (SUI); 21–10, 21–11	Andrea Lorenzová (CZE); Karin Žolnerčíková (CZE)
Gstaad Elite 16; Gstaad, Switzerland; US$150,000; 5–9 July 2023	Ana Patrícia Ramos (BRA); Eduarda Santos Lisboa (BRA); 21–18, 21–18	Sara Hughes (USA); Kelly Cheng (USA)	Kristen Nuss (USA); Taryn Kloth (USA); 21–19, 21–16	Svenja Müller (GER); Cinja Tillmann (GER)
Espinho Challenge; Espinho, Portugal; US$75,000; 13–16 July 2023	Carolina Solberg Salgado (BRA); Bárbara Seixas (BRA); 21–17, 21–14	Andressa Cavalcanti (BRA); Vitória Rodrigues (BRA)	Ágatha Bednarczuk (BRA); Rebecca Cavalcante (BRA); 21–17, 10–21, 17–15	Xue Chen (CHN); Xia Xinyi (CHN)
Leuven Future; Leuven, Belgium; US$5,000; 13–16 July 2023	Zeng Jinjin (CHN); Lin Meimei (CHN); 21–16, 21–15	Wies Bekhuis (NED); Kirsten Bröring (NED)	Menia Bentele (SUI); Anna Lutz (SUI); 21–14, 21–12	Leona Kernen (SUI); Annique Niederhauser (SUI)
Edmonton Challenge; Edmonton, Canada; US$75,000; 20–23 July 2023	Carolina Solberg Salgado (BRA); Bárbara Seixas (BRA); 21–14, 21–16	Valentina Gottardi (ITA); Marta Menegatti (ITA)	Barbora Hermannová (CZE); Marie-Sára Štochlová (CZE); 17–21, 26–24, 15–13	Esmée Böbner (SUI); Zoé Vergé-Dépré (SUI)
Montreal Elite 16; Montreal, Canada; US$150,000; 26–30 July 2023	Melissa Humana-Paredes (CAN); Brandie Wilkerson (CAN); 21–15, 16–21, 15–13	Julia Scoles (USA); Betsi Flint (USA)	Xue Chen (CHN); Xia Xinyi (CHN); 21–17, 20–22, 15–12	Katja Stam (NED); Raïsa Schoon (NED)
Warsaw Future I Warsaw, Poland; US$5,000; 10–13 August 2023	Dorina Klinger (AUT); Ronja Klinger (AUT); 21–14, 21–19	Jagoda Gruszczyńska (POL); Aleksandra Wachowicz (POL)	Clémence Vieira (FRA); Aline Chamereau (FRA); 18–21, 21–18, 15–10	Sunniva Helland-Hansen (NOR); Emilie Olimstad (NOR)
Wenzhou Future; Wenzhou, China; US$5,000; 10–13 August 2023	Zeng Jinjin (CHN); Lin Meimei (CHN); 21–12, 21–15	Wang Xinxin (CHN); Zhu Lingdi (CHN)	Yan Xu (CHN); Zhou Mingli (CHN); 21–19, 21–16	Georgia Johnson (AUS); Jasmine Fleming (AUS)
Hamburg Elite 16; Hamburg, Germany; US$150,000; 16–20 August 2023	Ana Patrícia Ramos (BRA); Eduarda Santos Lisboa (BRA); 21–16, 21–17	Kristen Nuss (USA); Taryn Kloth (USA)	Svenja Müller (GER); Cinja Tillmann (GER); 21–15, 21–19	Carolina Solberg Salgado (BRA); Bárbara Seixas (BRA)
Bujumbura Future; Bujumbura, Burundi; US$5,000; 17–20 August 2023	Liliana Fernández (ESP); Paula Soria (ESP); 21–16, 21–11	Eva Freiberger (AUT); Stephanie Wiesmeyr (AUT)	Janne Uhl (GER); Paula Schürholz (GER); 21–9, 21–16	Yahli Ashush (ISR); Michal Barannik (ISR)
Qidong Future; Qidong, China; US$5,000; 17–20 August 2023	Yan Xu (CHN); Zhou Mingli (CHN); 21–19, 21–16	Wang Xinxin (CHN); Zhu Lingdi (CHN)	Elizabeth Alchin (AUS); Kayla Mears (AUS); 24–26, 21–16, 15–10	Han Wenqin (AUS); Yuan Lvwen (AUS)
El Alamein Future; El Alamein, Egypt; US$5,000; 23–26 August 2023	Ieva Vasiliauskaitė (LTU); Jekaterina Kovalskaja (LTU); 21–23, 21–18, 15–13	Iya Lindahl (USA); Xolani Hodel (USA)	Gerda Grudzinskaitė (LTU); Rugilė Grudzinskaitė (LTU); 24–26, 21–16, 15–10	Daria Gusarova (CYP); Erika Nyström (CYP)
Baden Future; Baden, Austria; US$5,000; 23–26 August 2023	Dorina Klinger (AUT); Ronja Klinger (AUT); 21–12, 21–19	Leona Kernen (SUI); Annique Niederhauser (SUI)	Menia Bentele (SUI); Anna Lutz (SUI); 21–17, 22–24, 15–13	Melanie Paul (GER); Hanna-Marie Schieder (GER)
Brno Future; Brno, Czech Republic; US$5,000; 24–27 August 2023	Barbora Hermannová (CZE); Marie-Sára Štochlová (CZE); 21–16, 21–19	Teegan Van Gunst (USA); Kimberly Hildreth (USA)	Clémence Vieira (FRA); Aline Chamereau (FRA); 33–31, 21–19	Wies Bekhuis (NED); Desy Poiesz (NED)
Seoul Future; Seoul, South Korea; US$5,000; 24–27 August 2023	Carly Kan (USA); Lexy Denaburg (USA); 21–16, 21–14	Charanrutwadee Patcharamainaruebhorn (THA); Woranatchayakorn Phirachayakrailert (THA)	Asami Shiba (JPN); Saki Maruyama (JPN); 14–21, 21–12, 15–12	Elizabeth Alchin (AUS); Kayla Mears (AUS)
Corigliano-Rossano Future; Corigliano-Rossano, Italy; US$5,000; 31 August–3 September 2023	Sara Sinisalo (FIN); Anniina Parkkinen (FIN); 21–17, 21–18	Heleene Hollas (EST); Liisa Remmelg (EST)	Rachele Mancinelli (ITA); Aurora Mattavelli (ITA); 21–12, 21–15	Valerie Dvorníková (CZE); Anna Pospíšilová (CZE)
Warsaw Future II; Warsaw, Poland; US$5,000; 7–10 September 2023	Maryna Hladun (UKR); Tetiana Lazarenko (UKR); 21–10, 21–14	Heleene Hollas (EST); Liisa Remmelg (EST)	Inna Makhno (UKR); Sofiia Rylova (UKR); 21–19, 20–22, 16–14	Anna Pavelková (CZE); Katerina Pavelková (CZE)
Miguel Pereira Future; Miguel Pereira, Brazil; US$5,000; 7–10 September 2023	Carolina Horta (BRA); Ana Luiza Mohr (BRA); 21–15, 21–15	Teegan Van Gunst (USA); Katie Lindstrom (USA)	Flávia Moura (BRA); Fabrine Conceição (BRA); 21–14, 21–13	Lisbeth Allcca (PER); Claudia Gaona (PER)
Cervia Future; Cervia, Italy; US$5,000; 21–24 September 2023	Menia Bentele (SUI); Anna Lutz (SUI); 21–19, 22–24, 15–13	Jessica Allegretti (ITA); Eleonora Annibalini (ITA)	Reka Orsi Toth (ITA); Viktoria Orsi Toth (ITA); 21–12, 18–21, 15–8	Aurora Mattavelli (ITA); Rachele Mancinelli (ITA)
Halifax Future; Halifax, Canada; US$5,000; 21–24 September 2023	Heather Bansley (CAN); Sophie Bukovec (CAN); 21–16, 25–23	Kimberly Hildreth (USA); Teegan Van Gunst (USA)	Carli Lloyd (USA); Kylie Kuyava-DeBerg (USA); 21–15, 19–21, 15–13	Kahlee York (USA); Mariah Whalen (USA)
Paris Elite 16; Paris, France; US$150,000; 27 September–1 October 2023	Ana Patrícia Ramos (BRA); Eduarda Santos Lisboa (BRA); 21–10, 18–21, 15–13	Kristen Nuss (USA); Taryn Kloth (USA)	Katja Stam (NED); Raïsa Schoon (NED); 21–17, 22–20	Valentina Gottardi (ITA); Marta Menegatti (ITA)
World Championships; Tlaxcala, Mexico; US$500,000; 6–15 October 2023	Sara Hughes (USA); Kelly Cheng (USA); 21–16, 24–22	Ana Patrícia Ramos (BRA); Eduarda Santos Lisboa (BRA)	Kristen Nuss (USA); Taryn Kloth (USA); 15–21, 21–19, 15–8	Mariafe Artacho del Solar (AUS); Taliqua Clancy (AUS)
Mallorca Future; Palma Nova, Spain; US$5,000; 18–22 October 2023	Sarah Cools (BEL); Lisa van den Vonder (BEL); 22–20, 21–14	Nazaret Florián (ESP); Aina Munar (ESP)	Federica Frasca (ITA); Alice Gradini (ITA); 21–0, 21–0	Zhu Lingdi (CHN); Cao Shuting (CHN)
Goa Challenge; Goa, India; US$75,000; 19–22 October 2023	Anouk Vergé-Dépré (SUI); Joana Mäder (SUI); 21–19, 21–16	Sandra Ittlinger (GER); Karla Borger (GER)	Daniela Álvarez (ESP); Tania Moreno (ESP); 21–10, 21–16	Taravadee Naraphornrapat (THA); Worapeerachayakorn Kongphopsarutawadee (THA)
Haikou Challenge; Haikou, China; US$75,000; 2–5 November 2023	Carolina Solberg Salgado (BRA); Bárbara Seixas (BRA); 21–14, 21–9	Zhu Lingdi (CHN); Cao Shuting (CHN)	Tainá Silva (BRA); Victória Lopes (BRA); 21–15, 21–16	Monika Paulikienė (LTU); Ainė Raupelytė (LTU)
Chiang Mai Challenge; Chiang Mai, Thailand; US$75,000; 16–19 November 2023	Ágatha Bednarczuk (BRA); Rebecca Cavalcante (BRA); 21–17, 21–16	Niina Ahtiainen (FIN); Taru Lahti-Liukkonen (FIN)	Sarah Pavan (CAN); Molly McBain (CAN); 15–21, 21–16, 15–9	Wang Fan (CHN); Dong Jie (CHN)
João Pessoa Elite 16; João Pessoa, Brazil; US$150,000; 22–26 November 2023	Ana Patrícia Ramos (BRA); Eduarda Santos Lisboa (BRA); 29–31, 21–16, 15–11	Carolina Solberg Salgado (BRA); Bárbara Seixas (BRA)	Xue Chen (CHN); Xia Xinyi (CHN); 22–20, 20–22, 15–12	Kristen Nuss (USA); Taryn Kloth (USA)
Geelong Future; Geelong, Australia; US$5,000; 22–26 November 2023	Jasmine Fleming (AUS); Georgia Johnson (AUS); 21–19, 21–12	Alison McKay (CAN); Katherine Wuttunee (CAN)	Loti Joe (VAN); Linline Matauatu (VAN); 21–17, 15–21, 15–13	Madison Shields (USA); Delaney Peranich (USA)
Nuvali Challenge; Santa Rosa, Philippines; US$75,000; 30 November–3 December 2023	Anastasija Samoilova (LAT); Tīna Graudiņa (LAT); 21–14, 21–18	Daniela Álvarez (ESP); Tania Moreno (ESP)	Tainá Silva (BRA); Victória Lopes (BRA); 21–17, 21–14	Lézana Placette (FRA); Alexia Richard (FRA)
The Finals; Doha, Qatar; US$800,000; 6–9 December 2023	Kristen Nuss (USA); Taryn Kloth (USA); 21–17, 21–14	Svenja Müller (GER); Cinja Tillmann (GER)	Ana Patrícia Ramos (BRA); Eduarda Santos Lisboa (BRA); 21–13, 18–21, 15–12	Mariafe Artacho del Solar (AUS); Taliqua Clancy (AUS)

== Medal table by country ==
Rank	Nation	Gold	Silver	Bronze	Total
1	Brazil	12	8	12	32
2	United States	10	14	8	32
3	China	8	3	5	16
4	Italy	7	5	8	20
5	Austria	6	7	2	15
6	Norway	6	5	3	14
7	Australia	6	4	5	15
8	Switzerland	4	4	5	13
9	Czech Republic	4	3	2	9
10	Spain	4	3	1	8
11	Sweden	4	2	0	6
12	Canada	4	1	4	9
13	Germany	3	6	6	15
14	Netherlands	3	3	3	9
15	France	2	3	6	11
16	Latvia	2	2	4	8
17	Ukraine	2	1	1	4
18	Finland	2	1	0	3
19	Argentina	2	0	2	4
20	New Zealand	1	5	0	6
21	Lithuania	1	1	4	6
22	Belgium	1	1	0	2
23	Portugal	1	0	0	1
24	Poland	0	4	5	9
25	Estonia	0	2	0	2
25	Israel	0	2	0	2
25	Thailand	0	2	0	2
28	Japan	0	1	2	3
29	Hungary	0	1	0	1
29	Qatar	0	1	0	1
31	England	0	0	2	2
31	Vanuatu	0	0	2	2
33	Greece	0	0	1	1
33	Iran	0	0	1	1
33	Turkey	0	0	1	1
Totals (35 entries)		95	95	95	285
