= Brando =

Brando may refer to:

== People ==
- Brando, a surname borne by, among others:
  - Marlon Brando (1924–2004), American actor
  - Cheyenne Brando (1970–1995), daughter of Marlon Brando
  - Christian Brando (1958–2008), son of Marlon Brando
  - Miko C. Brando, son of Marlon Brando and Michael Jackson's one-time friend, bodyguard, and assistant
- Brando Badoer (born 2006), Italian racing driver
- Brando Benifei (born 1986), Italian politician
- Brando Eaton (born 1986), American actor
- Brando Huang (born 1981), Taiwanese actor and TV host
- Brandon Kelly Ulloa, American writer, known as Brando Skyhorse
- Brando Pacitto (born 1996), Italian actor
- Brando Quilici, Italian filmmaker
- Brando Va'aulu (born 1987), rugby player from New Zealand
- Marlon Lamont McClain II, American singer and songwriter, known as Brando

== Places ==
- Brändö, a municipality in Finland
- Brändö, Helsinki, a part of the city of Helsinki
- Brändö, Vaasa, a part of the city of Vaasa, Finland
- Brando, Haute-Corse, a commune in France
- Castel Brando, a medieval castle in the Veneto region of Italy

== Art, entertainment, and media ==
=== Films ===
- Brando (film), a 2007 documentary about Marlon Brando
- Brando with a Glass Eye, a 2024 drama by Antonis Tsonis

=== Fictional characters ===
- Brando Dingle, from the British soap opera Emmerdale
- Dio Brando, villain of the anime and manga series JoJo's Bizarre Adventure
- Dario Brando, father of Dio Brando from JoJo's Bizarre Adventure
- Diego Brando, an alternate universe counterpart of Dio Brando from Steel Ball Run

=== Music ===
- Branle, a Baroque dance known as brando in Italian
- The Brandos, a New York roots rock band

== See also ==
- Brandeau
- Brawndo
