= Brandy (surname) =

Brandy is an English surname likely derived from the Germanic word element brand, meaning "sword". Related surnames with the same meaning are the Italian Brandi and Brando.

- Damian Brandy (born 1981), English former cricketer
- Febian Brandy (born 1989), English footballer
- Joe Brandy (1897–1971), American college football and basketball player and college football head coach
- Sören Brandy (born 1985), German footballer
