= 4x4 beach volleyball at the 2023 World Beach Games =

- Location: Bali, Indonesia
- Dates: 6–12 August
- Competitors: 96 from TBD nations
- Teams: 16

The Beach volleyball tournaments at the 2023 World Beach Games, the second edition of the Games, will be held from 6 to 12 August 2023 in Bali, Indonesia and organised by the Association of National Olympic Committees (ANOC).

Two events will take place: the men's tournament and the women's tournament. A total of 16 teams will participate (8 in the men's competition and 8 in the women's). Both the men's and women's squads can consist of up to 6 players, meaning a total of 96 athletes are expected to take part.

The defending gold medallists are United States in the men's event and in the women's category.

== Competition schedule ==
The tournament will begin on 6 August and end on 12 August.Further details TBA.

== Qualification ==
Each National Olympic Committee (NOC) is allowed to enter one men's team and one women's team into the competition. In order to play at the Games, these teams need to qualify.

=== Men's qualification ===
| Mean of qualification | Date | Host | Vacancies | Qualified |
|---|---|---|---|---|
| Host nation | 24 May 2022 | | 1 | Indonesia |
| African Qualification Tournament | —N/a | | 1 | |
| Asian and Oceanian Qualification Tournament | —N/a | | 1 | |
| European Qualification Tournament | —N/a | | 1 | |
| North American Qualification Tournament | —N/a | | 1 | |
| South American Qualification Tournament | —N/a | | 1 | |
| Invitation process | —N/a | | 2 | |
| Total | | | 8 | |

=== Women's qualification ===
| Mean of qualification | Date | Host | Vacancies | Qualified |
|---|---|---|---|---|
| Host nation | 24 May 2022 | | 1 | Indonesia |
| African Qualification Tournament | —N/a | | 1 | |
| Asian and Oceanian Qualification Tournament | —N/a | | 1 | |
| European Qualification Tournament | —N/a | | 1 | |
| North American Qualification Tournament | —N/a | | 1 | |
| South American Qualification Tournament | —N/a | | 1 | |
| Invitation process | —N/a | | 2 | |
| Total | | | 8 | |

== Participating NOCs ==
The following National Olympic Committees (NOCs), as per the outcome of qualification events, will participate (the number of expected participating athletes of each NOC are shown in parentheses).

== Medal summary ==
=== Medal table ===
| Rank | Nation | Gold | Silver | Bronze | Total |
|---|---|---|---|---|---|
| Totals (0 entries) | | 0 | 0 | 0 | 0 |

=== Medalists ===
| Event | Gold | Silver | Bronze |
|---|---|---|---|
| Men's tournament | | | |
| Women's tournament | | | |

== See also ==
- 2022 Beach Volleyball World Championships
- 2022 European Beach Volleyball Championships
