= Brandy (given name) =

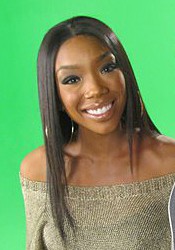
- Brandy Norwood
- Pronunciation: /ˈbrændi/ BRAN-dee
- Gender: Unisex; primarily feminine

Origin
- Origin: English

Other names
- Related names: Brandon, Brandi, Brandie

Brandy is a given name sometimes given in reference to the alcoholic beverage or used as a feminine form of Brandon.

Related surnames with the same meaning are the Italian Brandi and Brando. Usage of the name as a first name for boys has likely been a transferred use of the surname. Census records show that Brandy was in use as a masculine name in the United States, primarily for Black men, in the mid 19th century. Brandy was occasionally used as a hypocorism for women and girls for various names such as Brandina, Brenda, or Maranda, but was not widely used as a formal name for girls until the 1940s. Usage for girls might have been inspired by usage of the name Sherry, also the name of an alcoholic beverage, for girls in the 1940s. Further usage was inspired by use of the name for film characters: the attractive con woman character Brandy Kirby played by Lizabeth Scott in the 1951 film Two of a Kind, the saloon girl Brandy played by Mari Blanchard in the 1954 western Destry, and Brandy de la Court, played by Michele Girardon in the 1962 film Hatari! Spelling variant Brandi first appeared among the 1,000 most popular names for American girls in 1966. Brandy also appeared among the top 1,000 names in 1967. The name came into greater use in the Anglosphere following the release of the hit 1972 song "Brandy (You're a Fine Girl)" by Looking Glass. The name peaked in 1978 in the United States when it was the 37th most popular name for American girls. It has since declined in popularity. Spelling variants include Brandee, Brandi, Brandie, and Brandye.

== Women named Brandy ==
- Brandy Burre (born 1974), American actress
- Brandy Clark (born 1975), American country music singer-songwriter
- Brandy Colbert, American author of young adult fiction and nonfiction.
- Brandy Erholtz (née Griffith, born 1977), American former mountain runner
- Brandy Fluker Oakley (born 1983), American politician
- Brandy Johnson (born 1973), American gymnast and stuntwoman
- Brandy Ledford (born 1969), American actress and model
- Brandy R. McMillion (born 1979), American judge and lawyer
- Brandy Norwood (born 1979), American singer and actress also mononymously known as Brandy
- Brandy Payne (born 1978), Canadian politician
- Brandy Pyle (born 1980), American politician
- Brandy Reed (born 1977), American retired professional women's basketball player.
- Brandy Saturley (born 1972), Canadian visual artist
- Brandy Zadrozny (born 1980), American investigative journalist and reporter

== Women nicknamed Brandy ==
- Oracene Price (born 1952), American tennis coach and mother of Venus and Serena Williams

== Men named Brandy ==
- Brandy Peter (born 1991), Papua New Guinean professional rugby league footballer

== Men nicknamed Brandy ==
- Greg Alexander (born 1965), Australian rugby league player
- Jim Brandstatter (born 1949/1950), American football player and broadcaster
- Brandy Davis (1927–2005), American professional baseball player, manager, coach and longtime scout
- Brandy Semchuk (born 1971), Canadian former professional ice hockey player
- Branimir Ivan Sikic (born 1947), Austrian-born American medical doctor specializing in oncology and cancer pharmacology

== Fictional characters ==
- Brandy Harrington, a title character of the animated television series Brandy & Mr. Whiskers
