= Brandy Hill =

There are several places called Brandy Hill:

- Brandy Hill, South Wales, a hill
- Brandy Hill, New South Wales, a residential area
