= 2022 Beach Volleyball World Championships – Women's tournament =

Tournament details
- Host country: Italy
- City: Rome
- Dates: 10–19 June
- Teams: 48 (from 5 confederations)
- Venue: Foro Italico (3 courts)

Final positions
- Champions: Brazil; Duda; Ana Patrícia (th title)
- Runners-up: Canada; Sophie Bukovec; Brandie Wilkerson
- Third place: Germany; Svenja Müller; Cinja Tillmann
- Fourth place: Switzerland; Joana Heidrich; Anouk Vergé-Dépré

The women's tournament of the 2022 Beach Volleyball World Championships was held from 10 to 19 June 2022.

== Qualification ==
There were 48 teams qualified for the tournament.

== Schedule ==
The 48 teams were split into twelve pools, where the first two and the four best-third placed teams advanced to the knockout stage. The remaining eight third-ranked teams played in a lucky loser round to determine the last four teams. After that, a knockout system was used.

P	Preliminary round	LL	Lucky losers playoffs	1/16	Round of 32	1/8	Round of 16	1/4	Quarter-finals	1/2	Semi-finals	B	Bronze medal match	F	Final

Fri 10	Sat 11	Sun 12	Mon 13	Tue 14	Wed 15	Thu 16	Fri 17	Sat 18	Sun 19	
P	P	P	P	LL	1/16	1/8	1/4	1/2	B	F

== Preliminary round ==
The draw was held on 21 May 2022. If two teams are tied in points, the overall set and points ratio will be used. If three teams are tied on points, the matches against those teams determine the ranking.

All times are local (UTC+2).

=== Pool A ===
Pos	Team	Pld	W	L	Pts	SW	SL	SR	SPW	SPL	SPR	Qualification
1	(Netherlands) Stam – Schoon	3	3	0	6	6	0	MAX	127	75	1.693	Round of 32
2	(Argentina) Gallay – Pereyra	3	2	1	5	4	2	2.000	114	103	1.107	Round of 32
3	(Chile) Rivas – Vorpahl	3	1	2	4	2	4	0.500	106	103	1.029	Lucky loser playoffs
4	(Costa Rica) Williams – Núñez	3	0	3	3	0	6	0.000	60	126	0.476	

Source: FIVB

10 June 2022; 11:00	Stam – Schoon (Netherlands)	2–0	(Costa Rica) Williams – Núñez	Center court Referees: Vincent Roche (FRA), Giseli Amantino (BRA)
10 June 2022; 11:00	(21–5, 21–8); Report			Center court Referees: Vincent Roche (FRA), Giseli Amantino (BRA)

10 June 2022; 11:00	Gallay – Pereyra (Argentina)	2–0	(Chile) Rivas – Vorpahl	Court 2 Referees: Agnieszka Myszkowska (POL), Brigham Beatie (USA)
10 June 2022; 11:00	(21–16, 21–16); Report			Court 2 Referees: Agnieszka Myszkowska (POL), Brigham Beatie (USA)

11 June 2022; 11:10	Stam – Schoon (Netherlands)	2–0	(Chile) Rivas – Vorpahl	Center court Referees: Brigham Beatie (USA), Juan Saavedra (COL)
11 June 2022; 11:10	(21–17, 21–15); Report			Center court Referees: Brigham Beatie (USA), Juan Saavedra (COL)

11 June 2022; 12:10	Gallay – Pereyra (Argentina)	2–0	(Costa Rica) Williams – Núñez	Court 3 Referees: Maarten Ghysel (BEL), Mariko Satomi (JPN)
11 June 2022; 12:10	(21–11, 21–17); Report			Court 3 Referees: Maarten Ghysel (BEL), Mariko Satomi (JPN)

12 June 2022; 10:00	Stam – Schoon (Netherlands)	2–0	(Argentina) Gallay – Pereyra	Court 2 Referees: Davide Crescentini (ITA), Mariko Satomi (JPN)
12 June 2022; 10:00	(22–20, 21–10); Report			Court 2 Referees: Davide Crescentini (ITA), Mariko Satomi (JPN)

12 June 2022; 10:00	Rivas – Vorpahl (Chile)	2–0	(Costa Rica) Williams – Núñez	Court 3 Referees: Giovanni Bake (RSA), Giseli Amantino (BRA)
12 June 2022; 10:00	(21–7, 21–12); Report			Court 3 Referees: Giovanni Bake (RSA), Giseli Amantino (BRA)

=== Pool B ===
Pos	Team	Pld	W	L	Pts	SW	SL	SR	SPW	SPL	SPR	Qualification
1	(Brazil) Duda – Ana Patrícia	3	3	0	6	6	1	6.000	137	100	1.370	Round of 32
2	(China) Wang – Xia	3	2	1	5	4	2	2.000	108	113	0.956	Round of 32
3	(Austria) Schützenhöfer – Plesiutschnig	3	1	2	4	3	4	0.750	122	128	0.953	Lucky loser playoffs
4	(Czech Republic) Hermannová – Williams (Note: Williams replaced Marie-Sára Štochlová who withdrew due to an injury.)	3	0	3	3	0	6	0.000	100	126	0.794	

Source: FIVB
Notes:

10 June 2022; 14:00	Duda – Ana Patrícia (Brazil)	2–0	(China) Wang – Xia	Center court Referees: Mariko Satomi (JPN), Maarten Ghysel (BEL)
10 June 2022; 14:00	(21–11, 21–13); Report			Center court Referees: Mariko Satomi (JPN), Maarten Ghysel (BEL)

10 June 2022; 14:00	Hermannová – Williams (Czech Republic)	0–2	(Austria) Schützenhöfer – Plesiutschnig	Court 2 Referees: Brigham Beatie (USA), Juan Saavedra (COL)
10 June 2022; 14:00	(19–21, 14–21); Report			Court 2 Referees: Brigham Beatie (USA), Juan Saavedra (COL)

11 June 2022; 15:00	Duda – Ana Patrícia (Brazil)	2–1	(Austria) Schützenhöfer – Plesiutschnig	Center court Referees: Giuseppe Curto (ITA), Brigham Beatie (USA)
11 June 2022; 15:00	(21–13, 17–21, 15–11); Report			Center court Referees: Giuseppe Curto (ITA), Brigham Beatie (USA)

11 June 2022; 16:00	Hermannová – Williams (Czech Republic)	0–2	(China) Wang – Xia	Court 2 Referees: Robert Leko (SRB), Vincent Roche (FRA)
11 June 2022; 16:00	(18–21, 18–21); Report			Court 2 Referees: Robert Leko (SRB), Vincent Roche (FRA)

12 June 2022; 15:00	Duda – Ana Patrícia (Brazil)	2–0	(Czech Republic) Hermannová – Williams	Center court Referees: Robert Leko (SRB), Osvaldo Sumavil (ARG)
12 June 2022; 15:00	(21–12, 21–19); Report			Center court Referees: Robert Leko (SRB), Osvaldo Sumavil (ARG)

12 June 2022; 15:00	Schützenhöfer – Plesiutschnig (Austria)	0–2	(China) Wang – Xia	Court 2 Referees: Davide Crescentini (ITA), Mariko Satomi (JPN)
12 June 2022; 15:00	(18–21, 17–21); Report			Court 2 Referees: Davide Crescentini (ITA), Mariko Satomi (JPN)

=== Pool C ===
Pos	Team	Pld	W	L	Pts	SW	SL	SR	SPW	SPL	SPR	Qualification
1	(Switzerland) Heidrich – A. Vergé-Dépré	3	3	0	6	6	0	MAX	126	86	1.465	Round of 32
2	(Latvia) Kravčenoka – Graudiņa	3	2	1	5	4	2	2.000	116	90	1.289	Round of 32
3	(Japan) Ishii – Mizoe	3	1	2	4	2	4	0.500	104	109	0.954	Lucky loser playoffs
4	(Morocco) Zeroual – Mahassine	3	0	3	3	0	6	0.000	65	126	0.516	

Source: FIVB

10 June 2022; 09:00	Kravčenoka – Graudiņa (Latvia)	2–0	(Morocco) Zeroual – Mahassine	Court 2 Referees: Brigham Beatie (USA), Juan Saavedra (COL)
10 June 2022; 09:00	(21–13, 21–7); Report			Court 2 Referees: Brigham Beatie (USA), Juan Saavedra (COL)

10 June 2022; 09:00	Heidrich – A. Vergé-Dépré (Switzerland)	2–0	(Japan) Ishii – Mizoe	Center court Referees: Giseli Amantino (BRA), Giuseppe Curto (ITA)
10 June 2022; 09:00	(21–16, 21–18); Report			Center court Referees: Giseli Amantino (BRA), Giuseppe Curto (ITA)

11 June 2022; 09:00	Kravčenoka – Graudiņa (Latvia)	2–0	(Japan) Ishii – Mizoe	Center court Referees: Giuseppe Curto (ITA), Brigham Beatie (USA)
11 June 2022; 09:00	(21–17, 21–11); Report			Center court Referees: Giuseppe Curto (ITA), Brigham Beatie (USA)

11 June 2022; 10:00	Heidrich – A. Vergé-Dépré (Switzerland)	2–0	(Morocco) Zeroual – Mahassine	Court 3 Referees: Mariko Satomi (JPN), Nina Hobi (AUT)
11 June 2022; 10:00	(21–13, 21–7); Report			Court 3 Referees: Mariko Satomi (JPN), Nina Hobi (AUT)

12 June 2022; 09:00	Kravčenoka – Graudiņa (Latvia)	0–2	(Switzerland) Heidrich – A. Vergé-Dépré	Center court Referees: Robert Leko (SRB), Osvaldo Sumavil (ARG)
12 June 2022; 09:00	(19–21, 13–21); Report			Center court Referees: Robert Leko (SRB), Osvaldo Sumavil (ARG)

12 June 2022; 09:00	Ishii – Mizoe (Japan)	2–0	(Morocco) Zeroual – Mahassine	Court 2 Referees: Maarten Ghysel (BEL), Nina Hobi (AUT)
12 June 2022; 09:00	(21–11, 21–14); Report			Court 2 Referees: Maarten Ghysel (BEL), Nina Hobi (AUT)

=== Pool D ===
Pos	Team	Pld	W	L	Pts	SW	SL	SR	SPW	SPL	SPR	Qualification
1	(Canada) Megan – Nicole	3	3	0	6	6	1	6.000	139	116	1.198	Round of 32
2	(Brazil) Bárbara – Carol	3	2	1	5	5	2	2.500	137	88	1.557	Round of 32
3	(Paraguay) Erika – Poletti	3	1	2	4	2	4	0.500	104	114	0.912	Lucky loser playoffs
4	(Colombia) Diana – Margarita	3	0	3	3	0	6	0.000	64	126	0.508	

Source: FIVB

10 June 2022; 13:00	Megan – Nicole (Canada)	2–0	(Colombia) Diana – Margarita	Court 2 Referees: Giseli Amantino (BRA), Agnieszka Myszkowska (POL)
10 June 2022; 13:00	(21–11, 21–13); Report			Court 2 Referees: Giseli Amantino (BRA), Agnieszka Myszkowska (POL)

10 June 2022; 13:10	Bárbara – Carol (Brazil)	2–0	(Paraguay) Erika – Poletti	Center court Referees: Giuseppe Curto (ITA), Vincent Roche (FRA)
10 June 2022; 13:10	(21–8, 21–15); Report			Center court Referees: Giuseppe Curto (ITA), Vincent Roche (FRA)

11 June 2022; 16:00	Bárbara – Carol (Brazil)	2–0	(Colombia) Diana – Margarita	Court 3 Referees: Carlos Rivera (PUR), Davide Crescentini (ITA)
11 June 2022; 16:00	(21–6, 21–7); Report			Court 3 Referees: Carlos Rivera (PUR), Davide Crescentini (ITA)

11 June 2022; 17:00	Megan – Nicole (Canada)	2–0	(Paraguay) Erika – Poletti	Court 3 Referees: Maarten Ghysel (BEL), Mariko Satomi (JPN)
11 June 2022; 17:00	(21–17, 24–22); Report			Court 3 Referees: Maarten Ghysel (BEL), Mariko Satomi (JPN)

12 June 2022; 16:00	Bárbara – Carol (Brazil)	1–2	(Canada) Megan – Nicole	Center court Referees: Vincent Roche (FRA), Charalampos Papadogoulas (GRE)
12 June 2022; 16:00	(21–18, 21–23, 13–15); Report			Center court Referees: Vincent Roche (FRA), Charalampos Papadogoulas (GRE)

12 June 2022; 16:00	Diana – Margarita (Colombia)	0–2	(Paraguay) Erika – Poletti	Court 2 Referees: Agnieszka Myszkowska (POL), Maarten Ghysel (BEL)
12 June 2022; 16:00	(11–21, 16–21); Report			Court 2 Referees: Agnieszka Myszkowska (POL), Maarten Ghysel (BEL)

=== Pool E ===
Pos	Team	Pld	W	L	Pts	SW	SL	SR	SPW	SPL	SPR	Qualification
1	(Canada) Bukovec – Brandie	3	3	0	6	6	0	MAX	130	109	1.193	Round of 32
2	(United States) Flint – Cheng	3	2	1	5	4	3	1.333	133	115	1.157	Round of 32
3	(Switzerland) Böbner – Z. Vergé-Dépré	3	1	2	4	3	5	0.600	143	147	0.973	Lucky loser playoffs
4	(Italy) Calì – Tega	3	0	3	3	1	6	0.167	105	140	0.750	

Source: FIVB

10 June 2022; 15:00	Flint – Cheng (United States)	2–0	(Italy) Calì – Tega	Center court Referees: Nina Hobi (AUT), Osvaldo Sumavil (ARG)
10 June 2022; 15:00	(21–11, 21–13); Report			Center court Referees: Nina Hobi (AUT), Osvaldo Sumavil (ARG)

10 June 2022; 15:00	Bukovec – Brandie (Canada)	2–0	(Switzerland) Böbner – Z. Vergé-Dépré	Court 2 Referees: Robert Leko (SRB), Giseli Amantino (BRA)
10 June 2022; 15:00	(24–22, 21–17); Report			Court 2 Referees: Robert Leko (SRB), Giseli Amantino (BRA)

11 June 2022; 14:00	Flint – Cheng (United States)	2–1	(Switzerland) Böbner – Z. Vergé-Dépré	Court 3 Referees: Giseli Amantino (BRA), Maarten Ghysel (BEL)
11 June 2022; 14:00	17–21, 21–16, 15–12; Report			Court 3 Referees: Giseli Amantino (BRA), Maarten Ghysel (BEL)

11 June 2022; 16:00	Bukovec – Brandie (Canada)	2–0	(Italy) Calì – Tega	Center court Referees: Giovanni Bake (RSA), Giseli Amantino (BRA)
11 June 2022; 16:00	(21–12, 22–20); Report			Center court Referees: Giovanni Bake (RSA), Giseli Amantino (BRA)

12 June 2022; 19:00	Flint – Cheng (United States)	0–2	(Canada) Bukovec – Brandie	Court 2 Referees: Maarten Ghysel (BEL), Nina Hobi (AUT)
12 June 2022; 19:00	(19–21, 19–21); Report			Court 2 Referees: Maarten Ghysel (BEL), Nina Hobi (AUT)

12 June 2022; 21:00	Böbner – Z. Vergé-Dépré (Switzerland)	2–1	(Italy) Calì – Tega	Center court Referees: Maarten Ghysel (BEL), Agnieszka Myszkowska (POL)
12 June 2022; 21:00	(19–21, 21–16, 15–12); Report			Center court Referees: Maarten Ghysel (BEL), Agnieszka Myszkowska (POL)

=== Pool F ===
Pos	Team	Pld	W	L	Pts	SW	SL	SR	SPW	SPL	SPR	Qualification
1	(United States) Kolinske – Hughes	3	2	1	5	4	2	2.000	120	91	1.319	Round of 32
2	(Italy) Menegatti – Gottardi	3	2	1	5	4	2	2.000	120	113	1.062	Round of 32
3	(Spain) Carro – Lobato	3	2	1	5	4	2	2.000	113	115	0.983	Round of 32
4	(Ecuador) Ariana – Karelys	3	0	3	3	0	6	0.000	95	129	0.736	

Source: FIVB

10 June 2022; 18:00	Kolinske – Hughes (United States)	0–2	(Italy) Menegatti – Gottardi	Center court Referees: Maarten Ghysel (BEL), Rui Carvalho (POR)
10 June 2022; 18:00	(17–21, 19–21); Report			Center court Referees: Maarten Ghysel (BEL), Rui Carvalho (POR)

10 June 2022; 18:00	Carro – Lobato (Spain)	2–0	(Ecuador) Ariana – Karelys	Court 2 Referees: Davide Crescentini (ITA), Agnieszka Myszkowska (POL)
10 June 2022; 18:00	(21–17, 23–21); Report			Court 2 Referees: Davide Crescentini (ITA), Agnieszka Myszkowska (POL)

11 June 2022; 13:00	Kolinske – Hughes (United States)	2–0	(Ecuador) Ariana – Karelys	Court 3 Referees: Nina Hobi (AUT), Carlos Rivera (PUR)
11 June 2022; 13:00	(21–13, 21–9); Report			Court 3 Referees: Nina Hobi (AUT), Carlos Rivera (PUR)

11 June 2022; 19:00	Carro – Lobato (Spain)	2–0	(Italy) Menegatti – Gottardi	Center court Referees: Juan Saavedra (COL), Nina Hobi (AUT)
11 June 2022; 19:00	(21–17, 21–18); Report			Center court Referees: Juan Saavedra (COL), Nina Hobi (AUT)

12 June 2022; 19:00	Kolinske – Hughes (United States)	2–0	(Spain) Carro – Lobato	Court 3 Referees: Juan Saavedra (COL), Giuseppe Curto (ITA)
12 June 2022; 19:00	(21–13, 21–14); Report			Court 3 Referees: Juan Saavedra (COL), Giuseppe Curto (ITA)

12 June 2022; 22:00	Ariana – Karelys (Ecuador)	0–2	(Italy) Menegatti – Gottardi	Center court Referees: Nina Hobi (AUT), Mariko Satomi (JPN)
12 June 2022; 22:00	(15–21, 20–22); Report			Center court Referees: Nina Hobi (AUT), Mariko Satomi (JPN)

=== Pool G ===
Pos	Team	Pld	W	L	Pts	SW	SL	SR	SPW	SPL	SPR	Qualification
1	(Brazil) Talita – Rebecca	3	3	0	6	6	1	6.000	138	90	1.533	Round of 32
2	(Finland) Lahti – Ahtiainen	3	2	1	5	4	3	1.333	124	115	1.078	Round of 32
3	(United States) Day – Stockman	3	1	2	4	4	4	1.000	129	133	0.970	Round of 32
4	(Dominican Republic) Payano – Rosario	3	0	3	3	0	6	0.000	73	126	0.579	

Source: FIVB

10 June 2022; 12:00	Day – Stockman (United States)	1–2	(Finland) Lahti – Ahtiainen	Court 2 Referees: Juan Saavedra (COL), Robert Leko (SRB)
10 June 2022; 12:00	(21–14, 13–21, 12–15); Report			Court 2 Referees: Juan Saavedra (COL), Robert Leko (SRB)

10 June 2022; 12:10	Talita – Rebecca (Brazil)	2–0	(Dominican Republic) Payano – Rosario	Court 3 Referees: Carlos Rivera (PUR), Osvaldo Sumavil (ARG)
10 June 2022; 12:10	(21–6, 21–11); Report			Court 3 Referees: Carlos Rivera (PUR), Osvaldo Sumavil (ARG)

12 June 2022; 14:00	Talita – Rebecca (Brazil)	2–0	(Finland) Lahti – Ahtiainen	Center court Referees: Carlos Rivera (PUR), Vincent Roche (FRA)
12 June 2022; 14:00	(21–17, 21–15); Report			Center court Referees: Carlos Rivera (PUR), Vincent Roche (FRA)

12 June 2022; 14:00	Day – Stockman (United States)	2–0	(Dominican Republic) Payano – Rosario	Court 2 Referees: Maarten Ghysel (BEL), Nina Hobi (AUT)
12 June 2022; 14:00	(21–18, 21–11); Report			Court 2 Referees: Maarten Ghysel (BEL), Nina Hobi (AUT)

13 June 2022; 11:00	Lahti – Ahtiainen (Finland)	2–0	(Dominican Republic) Payano – Rosario	Court 3 Referees: Charalampos Papadogoulas (GRE), Davide Crescentini (ITA)
13 June 2022; 11:00	(21–17, 21–10); Report			Court 3 Referees: Charalampos Papadogoulas (GRE), Davide Crescentini (ITA)

13 June 2022; 12:00	Talita – Rebecca (Brazil)	2–1	(United States) Day – Stockman	Court 3 Referees: Robert Leko (SRB), Mariko Satomi (JPN)
13 June 2022; 12:00	(21–13, 18–21, 15–7); Report			Court 3 Referees: Robert Leko (SRB), Mariko Satomi (JPN)

=== Pool H ===
Pos	Team	Pld	W	L	Pts	SW	SL	SR	SPW	SPL	SPR	Qualification
1	(United States) Cannon – Sponcil	3	3	0	6	6	1	6.000	136	103	1.320	Round of 32
2	(Australia) Clancy – Mariafe	3	2	1	5	5	2	2.500	130	110	1.182	Round of 32
3	(Cuba) Leila – Lidy	3	1	2	4	2	4	0.500	111	114	0.974	Lucky loser playoffs
4	(Egypt) Farida – Doaa	3	0	3	3	0	6	0.000	76	126	0.603	

Source: FIVB

10 June 2022; 10:00	Clancy – Mariafe (Australia)	2–0	(Egypt) Farida – Doaa	Court 2 Referees: Robert Leko (SRB), Nina Hobi (AUT)
10 June 2022; 10:00	(21–10, 21–14); Report			Court 2 Referees: Robert Leko (SRB), Nina Hobi (AUT)

10 June 2022; 10:00	Cannon – Sponcil (United States)	2–0	(Cuba) Leila – Lidy	Center court Referees: Davide Crescentini (ITA), Mariko Satomi (JPN)
10 June 2022; 10:00	(21–16, 21–19); Report			Center court Referees: Davide Crescentini (ITA), Mariko Satomi (JPN)

12 June 2022; 13:00	Clancy – Mariafe (Australia)	2–0	(Cuba) Leila – Lidy	Center court Referees: Rui Carvalho (POR), Robert Leko (SRB)
12 June 2022; 13:00	(21–16, 21–18); Report			Center court Referees: Rui Carvalho (POR), Robert Leko (SRB)

12 June 2022; 13:00	Cannon – Sponcil (United States)	2–0	(Egypt) Farida – Doaa	Court 2 Referees: Mariko Satomi (JPN), Agnieszka Myszkowska (POL)
12 June 2022; 13:00	(21–9, 21–13); Report			Court 2 Referees: Mariko Satomi (JPN), Agnieszka Myszkowska (POL)

13 June 2022; 09:00	Clancy – Mariafe (Australia)	1–2	(United States) Cannon – Sponcil	Center court Referees: Maarten Ghysel (BEL), Giseli Amantino (BRA)
13 June 2022; 09:00	(21–16, 19–21, 6–15); Report			Center court Referees: Maarten Ghysel (BEL), Giseli Amantino (BRA)

13 June 2022; 10:00	Leila – Lidy (Cuba)	2–0	(Egypt) Farida – Doaa	Court 3 Referees: Mariko Satomi (JPN), Rui Carvalho (POR)
13 June 2022; 10:00	(21–14, 21–16); Report			Court 3 Referees: Mariko Satomi (JPN), Rui Carvalho (POR)

=== Pool I ===
Pos	Team	Pld	W	L	Pts	SW	SL	SR	SPW	SPL	SPR	Qualification
1	(Germany) Müller – Tillmann	3	3	0	6	6	2	3.000	114	105	1.086	Round of 32
2	(Brazil) Taiana Lima – Hegeile	3	1	2	4	2	5	0.400	124	135	0.919	Round of 32
3	(Thailand) Worapeerachayakorn – Naraphornrapat	3	1	2	4	4	4	1.000	95	108	0.880	Round of 32
4	(Italy) R. Orsi Toth – V. Orsi Toth	3	1	2	4	3	4	0.750	64	126	0.508	

Source: FIVB

10 June 2022; 21:00	Taiana Lima – Hegeile (Brazil)	0–2	(Italy) R. Orsi Toth – V. Orsi Toth	Center court Referees: Charalampos Papadogoulas (GRE), Osvaldo Sumavil (ARG)
10 June 2022; 21:00	(14–21, 19–21); Report			Center court Referees: Charalampos Papadogoulas (GRE), Osvaldo Sumavil (ARG)

10 June 2022; 22:00	Müller – Tillmann (Germany)	2–1	(Thailand) Worapeerachayakorn – Naraphornrapat	Center court Referees: Agnieszka Myszkowska (POL), Brigham Beatie (USA)
10 June 2022; 22:00	(17–21, 21–15, 15–11)			Center court Referees: Agnieszka Myszkowska (POL), Brigham Beatie (USA)

12 June 2022; 11:00	Taiana Lima – Hegeile (Brazil)	2–1	(Thailand) Worapeerachayakorn – Naraphornrapat	Court 2 Referees: Agnieszka Myszkowska (POL), Maarten Ghysel (BEL)
12 June 2022; 11:00	(21–17, 19–21, 15–10); Report			Court 2 Referees: Agnieszka Myszkowska (POL), Maarten Ghysel (BEL)

12 June 2022; 11:00	Müller – Tillmann (Germany)	2–1 (Note: The Italian pair had to withdraw due to an injury, shortly after the second set started.)	(Italy) R. Orsi Toth – V. Orsi Toth	Center court Referees: Osvaldo Sumavil (ARG), Rui Carvalho (POR)
12 June 2022; 11:00	(15–21, 21–1, 15–0); Report			Center court Referees: Osvaldo Sumavil (ARG), Rui Carvalho (POR)

13 June 2022; 18:00	Taiana Lima – Hegeile (Brazil)	0–2	(Germany) Müller – Tillmann	Center court Referees: Brigham Beatie (USA), Giovanni Bake (RSA)
13 June 2022; 18:00	(22–24, 14–21); Report			Center court Referees: Brigham Beatie (USA), Giovanni Bake (RSA)

13 June 2022; 19:00	Worapeerachayakorn – Naraphornrapat (Thailand)	w/o	(Italy) R. Orsi Toth – V. Orsi Toth	Center court

=== Pool J ===
Pos	Team	Pld	W	L	Pts	SW	SL	SR	SPW	SPL	SPR	Qualification
1	(Canada) Pavan – Melissa	3	3	0	6	6	0	MAX	131	104	1.260	Round of 32
2	(France) Placette – Richard	3	2	1	5	4	3	1.333	133	123	1.081	Round of 32
3	(Germany) Laboureur – Schulz	3	1	2	4	3	4	0.750	132	128	1.031	Round of 32
4	(Australia) Stevens – Johnson	3	0	3	3	0	6	0.000	86	127	0.677	

Source: FIVB

10 June 2022; 16:00	Pavan – Melissa (Canada)	2–0	(Australia) Stevens – Johnson	Court 2 Referees: Agnieszka Myszkowska (POL), Brigham Beatie (USA)
10 June 2022; 16:00	(21–17, 21–6); Report			Court 2 Referees: Agnieszka Myszkowska (POL), Brigham Beatie (USA)

10 June 2022; 16:00	Laboureur – Schulz (Germany)	1–2	(France) Placette – Richard	Center court Referees: Davide Crescentini (ITA), Mariko Satomi (JPN)
10 June 2022; 16:00	(19–21, 21–15, 8–15); Report			Center court Referees: Davide Crescentini (ITA), Mariko Satomi (JPN)

12 June 2022; 17:00	Pavan – Melissa (Canada)	2–0	(France) Placette – Richard	Court 3 Referees: Giuseppe Curto (ITA), Giovanni Bake (RSA)
12 June 2022; 17:00	(22–20, 21–19)			Court 3 Referees: Giuseppe Curto (ITA), Giovanni Bake (RSA)

12 June 2022; 17:00	Laboureur – Schulz (Germany)	2–0	(Australia) Stevens – Johnson	Court 2 Referees: Nina Hobi (AUT), Davide Crescentini (ITA)
12 June 2022; 17:00	(21–15, 21–16); Report			Court 2 Referees: Nina Hobi (AUT), Davide Crescentini (ITA)

13 June 2022; 13:00	Placette – Richard (France)	2–0	(Australia) Stevens – Johnson	Court 3 Referees: Rui Carvalho (POR), Charalampos Papadogoulas (GRE)
13 June 2022; 13:00	(22–20, 21–12); Report			Court 3 Referees: Rui Carvalho (POR), Charalampos Papadogoulas (GRE)

13 June 2022; 16:00	Pavan – Melissa (Canada)	2–0	(Germany) Laboureur – Schulz	Court 3 Referees: Charalampos Papadogoulas (GRE), Davide Crescentini (ITA)
13 June 2022; 16:00	(25–23, 21–19); Report			Court 3 Referees: Charalampos Papadogoulas (GRE), Davide Crescentini (ITA)

=== Pool K ===
Pos	Team	Pld	W	L	Pts	SW	SL	SR	SPW	SPL	SPR	Qualification
1	(Switzerland) Hüberli – Brunner	3	3	0	6	6	0	MAX	126	70	1.800	Round of 32
2	(Germany) Ittlinger – Schneider	3	2	1	5	4	3	1.333	132	114	1.158	Round of 32
3	(Mexico) Gutiérrez – Quintero	3	1	2	4	3	4	0.750	108	123	0.878	Lucky loser playoffs
4	(Mozambique) Sinaportar – Muianga	3	0	3	3	0	6	0.000	67	126	0.532	

Source: FIVB

10 June 2022; 19:00	Hüberli – Brunner (Switzerland)	2–0	(Mozambique) Sinaportar – Muianga	Court 2 Referees: Brigham Beatie (USA), Juan Saavedra (COL)
10 June 2022; 19:00	(21–8, 21–8); Report			Court 2 Referees: Brigham Beatie (USA), Juan Saavedra (COL)

10 June 2022; 19:00	Ittlinger – Schneider (Germany)	2–1	(Mexico) Gutiérrez – Quintero	Court 3 Referees: Giovanni Bake (RSA), Carlos Rivera (PUR)
10 June 2022; 19:00	(20–22, 21–13, 15–11); Report			Court 3 Referees: Giovanni Bake (RSA), Carlos Rivera (PUR)

12 June 2022; 18:00	Hüberli – Brunner (Switzerland)	2–0	(Mexico) Gutiérrez – Quintero	Court 2 Referees: Mariko Satomi (JPN), Agnieszka Myszkowska (POL)
12 June 2022; 18:00	(21–12, 21–8); Report			Court 2 Referees: Mariko Satomi (JPN), Agnieszka Myszkowska (POL)

12 June 2022; 18:00	Ittlinger – Schneider (Germany)	2–0	(Mozambique) Sinaportar – Muianga	Court 3 Referees: Giseli Amantino (BRA), Brigham Beatie (USA)
12 June 2022; 18:00	(21–11, 21–15); Report			Court 3 Referees: Giseli Amantino (BRA), Brigham Beatie (USA)

13 June 2022; 14:00	Gutiérrez – Quintero (Mexico)	2–0	(Mozambique) Sinaportar – Muianga	Court 3 Referees: Davide Crescentini (ITA), Robert Leko (SRB)
13 June 2022; 14:00	(21–17, 21–8); Report			Court 3 Referees: Davide Crescentini (ITA), Robert Leko (SRB)

13 June 2022; 17:00	Hüberli – Brunner (Switzerland)	2–0	(Germany) Ittlinger – Schneider	Center court Referees: Agnieszka Myszkowska (POL), Osvaldo Sumavil (ARG)
13 June 2022; 17:00	(21–19, 21–15); Report			Center court Referees: Agnieszka Myszkowska (POL), Osvaldo Sumavil (ARG)

=== Pool L ===
Pos	Team	Pld	W	L	Pts	SW	SL	SR	SPW	SPL	SPR	Qualification
1	(Germany) Borger – Sude	3	3	0	6	6	0	MAX	126	83	1.518	Round of 32
2	(Poland) Wojtasik – Kociołek	3	2	1	5	4	2	2.000	106	97	1.093	Round of 32
3	(Italy) Scampoli – Bianchin	3	1	2	4	2	4	0.500	109	101	1.079	Lucky loser playoffs
4	(Kenya) Makokha – Khadambi	3	0	3	3	0	6	0.000	66	126	0.524	

Source: FIVB

10 June 2022; 17:00	Scampoli – Bianchin (Italy)	2–0	(Kenya) Makokha – Khadambi	Center court Referees: Vincent Roche (FRA), Nina Hobi (AUT)
10 June 2022; 17:00	(21–8, 21–9); Report			Center court Referees: Vincent Roche (FRA), Nina Hobi (AUT)

10 June 2022; 17:00	Borger – Sude (Germany)	2–0	(Poland) Wojtasik – Kociołek	Court 2 Referees: Juan Saavedra (COL), Robert Leko (SRB)
10 June 2022; 17:00	(21–9, 21–13); Report			Court 2 Referees: Juan Saavedra (COL), Robert Leko (SRB)

12 June 2022; 12:00	Scampoli – Bianchin (Italy)	0–2	(Poland) Wojtasik – Kociołek	Center court Referees: Charalampos Papadogoulas (GRE), Carlos Rivera (PUR)
12 June 2022; 12:00	(18–21, 12–21); Report			Center court Referees: Charalampos Papadogoulas (GRE), Carlos Rivera (PUR)

12 June 2022; 12:00	Borger – Sude (Germany)	2–0	(Kenya) Makokha – Khadambi	Court 2 Referees: Nina Hobi (AUT), Davide Crescentini (ITA)
12 June 2022; 12:00	(21–11, 21–13); Report			Court 2 Referees: Nina Hobi (AUT), Davide Crescentini (ITA)

13 June 2022; 15:00	Wojtasik – Kociołek (Poland)	2–0	(Kenya) Makokha – Khadambi	Court 3 Referees: Mariko Satomi (JPN), Rui Carvalho (POR)
13 June 2022; 15:00	(21–8, 21–17); Report			Court 3 Referees: Mariko Satomi (JPN), Rui Carvalho (POR)

13 June 2022; 21:00	Scampoli – Bianchin (Italy)	0–2	(Germany) Borger – Sude	Center court Referees: Maarten Ghysel (BEL), Agnieszka Myszkowska (POL)
13 June 2022; 21:00	(19–21, 18–21); Report			Center court Referees: Maarten Ghysel (BEL), Agnieszka Myszkowska (POL)

=== Ranking of third-placed teams ===
Pos	Grp	Team	Pld	W	L	Pts	SW	SL	SR	SPW	SPL	SPR	Qualification
1	F	(Spain) Carro – Lobato	3	2	1	5	4	2	2.000	113	115	0.983	Round of 32
2	G	(United States) Day – Stockman	3	1	2	4	4	4	1.000	129	133	0.970	Round of 32
3	I	(Thailand) Worapeerachayakorn – Naraphornrapat	3	1	2	4	4	4	1.000	95	108	0.880	Round of 32
4	J	(Germany) Laboureur – Schulz	3	1	2	4	3	4	0.750	132	128	1.031	Round of 32
5	B	(Austria) Schützenhöfer – Plesiutschnig	3	1	2	4	3	4	0.750	122	128	0.953	Lucky losers playoffs
6	K	(Mexico) Gutiérrez – Quintero	3	1	2	4	3	4	0.750	108	123	0.878	Lucky losers playoffs
7	E	(Switzerland) Böbner – Z. Vergé-Dépré	3	1	2	4	3	5	0.600	143	147	0.973	Lucky losers playoffs
8	L	(Italy) Scampoli – Bianchin	3	1	2	4	2	4	0.500	109	101	1.079	Lucky losers playoffs
9	A	(Chile) Rivas – Vorpahl	3	1	2	4	2	4	0.500	106	103	1.029	Lucky losers playoffs
10	H	(Cuba) Leila – Lidy	3	1	2	4	2	4	0.500	111	114	0.974	Lucky losers playoffs
11	C	(Japan) Ishii – Mizoe	3	1	2	4	2	4	0.500	104	109	0.954	Lucky losers playoffs
12	D	(Paraguay) Erika – Poletti	3	1	2	4	2	4	0.500	104	114	0.912	Lucky losers playoffs

Source: FIVB

=== Lucky losers playoffs ===
14 June 2022; 14:00	Gutiérrez – Quintero (Mexico)	1–2	(Japan) Ishii – Mizoe	Center court Referees: Hobi Nina (AUT), Roche Vincent (FRA)
14 June 2022; 14:00	(24–22, 12–21, 8–15); Report			Center court Referees: Hobi Nina (AUT), Roche Vincent (FRA)

14 June 2022; 15:00	Scampoli – Bianchin (Italy)	2–1	(Chile) Rivas – Vorpahl	Center court Referees: Mariko Satomi (JPN), Rui Carvalho (POR)
14 June 2022; 15:00	(13–21, 21–19, 15–8); Report			Center court Referees: Mariko Satomi (JPN), Rui Carvalho (POR)

14 June 2022; 16:00	Böbner – Z. Vergé-Dépré (Switzerland)	2–1	(Cuba) Leila – Lidy	Center court Referees: Giseli Amantino (BRA), Osvaldo Sumavil (ARG)
14 June 2022; 16:00	(21–16, 13–21, 15–12); Report			Center court Referees: Giseli Amantino (BRA), Osvaldo Sumavil (ARG)

14 June 2022; 17:00	Schützenhöfer – Plesiutschnig (Austria)	2–1	(Paraguay) Erika – Poletti	Center court Referees: Agnieszka Myszkowska (POL), Giovanni Bake (RSA)
14 June 2022; 17:00	(21–13, 19–21, 15–10); Report			Center court Referees: Agnieszka Myszkowska (POL), Giovanni Bake (RSA)

== Knockout stage ==
=== Bracket ===
Round of 32
15 June
(Netherlands) Stam – Schoon	2
(Austria) Schützenhöfer – Plesiutschnig	0
15 June
(Germany) Ittlinger – Schneider	0
(Australia) Clancy – Mariafe	2
15 June
(Germany) Müller – Tillmann	2
(Finland) Lahti – Ahtiainen	1
15 June
(Spain) Carro – Lobato	0
(United States) Cannon – Sponcil	2
15 June
(Canada) Bukovec – Brandie	2
(Thailand) Worapeerachayakorn – Naraphornrapat	1
15 June
(United States) Flint – Cheng	1
(Germany) Borger – Sude	2
15 June
(Argentina) Gallay – Pereyra	0
(Italy) Menegatti – Gottardi	2
15 June
(Italy) Scampoli – Bianchin	2
(Canada) Megan – Nicole	1
15 June
(Switzerland) Heidrich – A. Vergé-Dépré	2
(Switzerland) Böbner – Z. Vergé-Dépré	1
15 June
(Latvia) Kravčenoka – Graudiņa	2
(Poland) Wojtasik – Kociołek	0
15 June
(Switzerland) Hüberli – Brunner	2
(France) Placette – Richard	1
15 June
(United States) Day – Stockman	0
(United States) Kolinske – Hughes	2
15 June
(Brazil) Talita – Rebecca	2
(Germany) Laboureur – Schulz	1
15 June
(Brazil) Taiana Lima – Hegeile	1
(Canada) Pavan – Melissa	2
15 June
(Brazil) Bárbara – Carol	2
(China) Wang – Xia	0
15 June
(Japan) Ishii – Mizoe	0
(Brazil) Duda – Ana Patrícia	2

Round of 16
16 June
(Netherlands) Stam – Schoon	0
(Australia) Clancy – Mariafe	2
16 June
(Germany) Müller – Tillmann	2
(United States) Cannon – Sponcil	1
16 June
(Canada) Bukovec – Brandie	2
(Germany) Borger – Sude	1
16 June
(Italy) Menegatti – Gottardi	2
(Italy) Scampoli – Bianchin	0
16 June
(Switzerland) Heidrich – A. Vergé-Dépré	2
(Latvia) Kravčenoka – Graudiņa	0
16 June
(Switzerland) Hüberli – Brunner	0
(United States) Kolinske – Hughes	2
16 June
(Brazil) Talita – Rebecca	1
(Canada) Pavan – Melissa	2
16 June
(Brazil) Bárbara – Carol	0
(Brazil) Duda – Ana Patrícia	2

Quarter-finals
17 June
(Australia) Clancy – Mariafe	1
(Germany) Müller – Tillmann	2
17 June
(Canada) Bukovec – Brandie	2
(Italy) Menegatti – Gottardi	0
17 June
(Switzerland) Heidrich – A. Vergé-Dépré	2
(United States) Kolinske – Hughes	0
17 June
(Canada) Pavan – Melissa	0
(Brazil) Duda – Ana Patrícia	2

Semi-finals
18 June
(Germany) Müller – Tillmann	1
(Canada) Bukovec – Brandie	2
18 June
(Switzerland) Heidrich – A. Vergé-Dépré	0
(Brazil) Duda – Ana Patrícia	2

Final
19 June
(Canada) Bukovec – Brandie	0
(Brazil) Duda – Ana Patrícia	2
Third place
19 June
(Germany) Müller – Tillmann	2
(Switzerland) Heidrich – A. Vergé-Dépré	1

=== Round of 32 ===
15 June 2022; 09:00	Day – Stockman (United States)	0–2	(United States) Kolinske – Hughes	Court 3 Referees: Nina Hobi (AUT), Rui Carvalho (POR)
15 June 2022; 09:00	(19–21, 16–21); Report			Court 3 Referees: Nina Hobi (AUT), Rui Carvalho (POR)

15 June 2022; 10:00	Hüberli – Brunner (Switzerland)	2–1	(France) Placette – Richard	Court 3 Referees: Robert Leko (SRB), Maarten Ghysel (BEL)
15 June 2022; 10:00	(21–14, 20–22, 15–11); Report			Court 3 Referees: Robert Leko (SRB), Maarten Ghysel (BEL)

15 June 2022; 11:00	Flint – Cheng (United States)	1–2	(Germany) Borger – Sude	Court 2 Referees: Osvaldo Sumavil (ARG), Carlos Rivera (PUR)
15 June 2022; 11:00	(17–21, 21–11, 12–15); Report			Court 2 Referees: Osvaldo Sumavil (ARG), Carlos Rivera (PUR)

15 June 2022; 11:00	Bukovec – Brandie (Canada)	2–1	(Thailand) Worapeerachayakorn – Naraphornrapat	Court 3 Referees: Mariko Satomi (JPN), Nina Hobi (AUT)
15 June 2022; 11:00	(21–16, 19–21, 15–12); Report			Court 3 Referees: Mariko Satomi (JPN), Nina Hobi (AUT)

15 June 2022; 12:00	Müller – Tillmann (Germany)	2–1	(Finland) Lahti – Ahtiainen	Center court Referees: Agnieszka Myszkowska (POL), Charalampos Papadogoulas (GRE)
15 June 2022; 12:00	(21–18, 20–22, 18–16); Report			Center court Referees: Agnieszka Myszkowska (POL), Charalampos Papadogoulas (GRE)

15 June 2022; 12:00	Carro – Lobato (Spain)	0–2	(United States) Cannon – Sponcil	Court 3 Referees: Rui Carvalho (POR), Robert Leko (SRB)
15 June 2022; 12:00	(12–21, 19–21); Report			Court 3 Referees: Rui Carvalho (POR), Robert Leko (SRB)

15 June 2022; 13:00	Kravčenoka – Graudiņa (Latvia)	2–0	(Poland) Wojtasik – Kociołek	Center court Referees: Beatie Brigham (USA), Crescentini Davide (ITA)
15 June 2022; 13:00	(21–19, 21–19); Report			Center court Referees: Beatie Brigham (USA), Crescentini Davide (ITA)

15 June 2022; 14:00	Bárbara – Carol (Brazil)	2–0	(China) Wang – Xia	Center court Referees: Charalampos Papadogoulas (GRE), Giovanni Bake (RSA)
15 June 2022; 14:00	(21–18, 21–15); Report			Center court Referees: Charalampos Papadogoulas (GRE), Giovanni Bake (RSA)

15 June 2022; 15:00	Ittlinger – Schneider (Germany)	0–2	(Australia) Clancy – Mariafe	Center court Referees: Davide Crescentini (ITA), Giuseppe Curto (ITA)
15 June 2022; 15:00	(17–21, 20–22); Report			Center court Referees: Davide Crescentini (ITA), Giuseppe Curto (ITA)

15 June 2022; 15:00	Stam – Schoon (Netherlands)	2–0	(Austria) Schützenhöfer – Plesiutschnig	Court 3 Referees: Rui Carvalho (POR), Mariko Satomi (JPN)
15 June 2022; 15:00	(21–17, 21–18); Report			Court 3 Referees: Rui Carvalho (POR), Mariko Satomi (JPN)

15 June 2022; 16:00	Gallay – Pereyra (Argentina)	0–2	(Italy) Menegatti – Gottardi	Center court Referees: Giovanni Bake (RSA), Agnieszka Myszkowska (POL)
15 June 2022; 16:00	(15–21, 17–21); Report			Center court Referees: Giovanni Bake (RSA), Agnieszka Myszkowska (POL)

15 June 2022; 16:00	Ishii – Mizoe (Japan)	0–2	(Brazil) Duda – Ana Patrícia	Court 3 Referees: Robert Leko (SRB), Maarten Ghysel (BEL)
15 June 2022; 16:00	(11–21, 14–21); Report			Court 3 Referees: Robert Leko (SRB), Maarten Ghysel (BEL)

15 June 2022; 17:00	Taiana Lima – Hegeile (Brazil)	1–2	(Canada) Pavan – Melissa	Center court Referees: Giuseppe Curto (ITA), Beatie Brigham (USA)
15 June 2022; 17:00	(21–18, 18–21, 10–15); Report			Center court Referees: Giuseppe Curto (ITA), Beatie Brigham (USA)

15 June 2022; 17:00	Talita – Rebecca (Brazil)	2–1	(Germany) Laboureur – Schulz	Court 2 Referees: Vincent Roche (FRA), Juan Saavedra (COL)
15 June 2022; 17:00	(19–21, 21–12, 15–7); Report			Court 2 Referees: Vincent Roche (FRA), Juan Saavedra (COL)

15 June 2022; 19:00	Scampoli – Bianchin (Italy)	2–1	(Canada) Megan – Nicole	Center court Referees: Robert Leko (SRB), Maarten Ghysel (BEL)
15 June 2022; 19:00	(21–12, 18–21, 15–12); Report			Center court Referees: Robert Leko (SRB), Maarten Ghysel (BEL)

15 June 2022; 19:00	Heidrich – A. Vergé-Dépré (Switzerland)	2–1	(Switzerland) Böbner – Z. Vergé-Dépré	Court 3 Referees: Agnieszka Myszkowska (POL), Davide Crescentini (ITA)
15 June 2022; 19:00	(20–22, 21–17, 15–7); Report			Court 3 Referees: Agnieszka Myszkowska (POL), Davide Crescentini (ITA)

=== Round of 16 ===
16 June 2022; 11:00	Bukovec – Brandie (Canada)	2–1	(Germany) Borger – Sude	Court 2 Referees: Juan Saavedra (COL), Carlos Rivera (PUR)
16 June 2022; 11:00	(19–21, 21–19, 15–10); Report			Court 2 Referees: Juan Saavedra (COL), Carlos Rivera (PUR)

16 June 2022; 12:00	Müller – Tillmann (Germany)	2–1	(United States) Cannon – Sponcil	Center court Referees: Mariko Satomi (JPN), Charalampos Papadogoulas (GRE)
16 June 2022; 12:00	(19–21, 21–16, 15–11); Report			Center court Referees: Mariko Satomi (JPN), Charalampos Papadogoulas (GRE)

16 June 2022; 13:00	Stam – Schoon (Netherlands)	0–2	(Australia) Clancy – Mariafe	Court 2 Referees: Carlos Rivera (PUR), Rui Carvalho (POR)
16 June 2022; 13:00	(15–21, 21–23); Report			Court 2 Referees: Carlos Rivera (PUR), Rui Carvalho (POR)

16 June 2022; 14:00	Bárbara – Carol (Brazil)	0–2	(Brazil) Duda – Ana Patrícia	Center court Referees: Nina Hobi (AUT), Vincent Roche (FRA)
16 June 2022; 14:00	(16–21, 17–21); Report			Center court Referees: Nina Hobi (AUT), Vincent Roche (FRA)

16 June 2022; 15:00	Hüberli – Brunner (Switzerland)	0–2	(United States) Kolinske – Hughes	Court 2 Referees: Rui Carvalho (POR), Juan Saavedra (COL)
16 June 2022; 15:00	(19–21, 9–21); Report			Court 2 Referees: Rui Carvalho (POR), Juan Saavedra (COL)

16 June 2022; 15:00	Talita – Rebecca (Brazil)	1–2	(Canada) Pavan – Melissa	Center court Referees: Charalampos Papadogoulas (GRE), Mariko Satomi (JPN)
16 June 2022; 15:00	(21–16, 11–21, 16–18); Report			Center court Referees: Charalampos Papadogoulas (GRE), Mariko Satomi (JPN)

16 June 2022; 19:00	Menegatti – Gottardi (Italy)	2–0	(Italy) Scampoli – Bianchin	Center court Referees: Giseli Amantino (BRA), Mariko Satomi (JPN)
16 June 2022; 19:00	(25–23, 21–15); Report			Center court Referees: Giseli Amantino (BRA), Mariko Satomi (JPN)

16 June 2022; 19:00	Heidrich – A. Vergé-Dépré (Switzerland)	2–0	(Latvia) Kravčenoka – Graudiņa	Court 3 Referees: Maarten Ghysel (BEL), Juan Saavedra (COL)
16 June 2022; 19:00	(24–22, 21–10); Report			Court 3 Referees: Maarten Ghysel (BEL), Juan Saavedra (COL)

=== Quarterfinals ===
17 June 2022; 11:00	Pavan – Melissa (Canada)	0–2	(Brazil) Duda – Ana Patrícia	Center court Referees: Maarten Ghysel (BEL), Charalampos Papadogoulas (GRE)
17 June 2022; 11:00	(22–24, 14–21); Report			Center court Referees: Maarten Ghysel (BEL), Charalampos Papadogoulas (GRE)

17 June 2022; 12:00	Heidrich – A. Vergé-Dépré (Switzerland)	2–0	(United States) Kolinske – Hughes	Center court Referees: Juan Saavedra (COL), Giseli Amantino (BRA)
17 June 2022; 12:00	(21–17, 21–18); Report			Center court Referees: Juan Saavedra (COL), Giseli Amantino (BRA)

17 June 2022; 14:00	Clancy – Mariafe (Australia)	1–2	(Germany) Müller – Tillmann	Center court Referees: Carlos Rivera (PUR), Davide Crescentini (ITA)
17 June 2022; 14:00	(23–21, 18–21, 14–16); Report			Center court Referees: Carlos Rivera (PUR), Davide Crescentini (ITA)

17 June 2022; 20:00	Bukovec – Brandie (Canada)	2–0	(Italy) Menegatti – Gottardi	Center court Referees: Nina Hobi (AUT), Osvaldo Sumavil (ARG)
17 June 2022; 20:00	(21–15, 21–12); Report			Center court Referees: Nina Hobi (AUT), Osvaldo Sumavil (ARG)

=== Semifinals ===
18 June 2022; 16:00	Heidrich – A. Vergé-Dépré (Switzerland)	0–2	(Brazil) Duda – Ana Patrícia	Center court Referees: Carlos Rivera (PUR), Brigham Beatie (USA)
18 June 2022; 16:00	(19–21, 13–21); Report			Center court Referees: Carlos Rivera (PUR), Brigham Beatie (USA)

18 June 2022; 20:00	Müller – Tillmann (Germany)	1–2	(Canada) Bukovec – Brandie	Center court Referees: Juan Saavedra (COL), Osvaldo Sumavil (ARG)
18 June 2022; 20:00	(15–21, 21–15, 12–15); Report			Center court Referees: Juan Saavedra (COL), Osvaldo Sumavil (ARG)

=== Bronze medal match ===
19 June 2022; 16:00	Müller – Tillmann (Germany)	2–1 (Note: The Swiss pair had to withdraw due to an injury, during the second set.)	(Switzerland) Heidrich – A. Vergé-Dépré	Center court Referees: Giseli Amantino (BRA), Brigham Beatie (USA)
19 June 2022; 16:00	(16–21, 21–10, 15–0); Report			Center court Referees: Giseli Amantino (BRA), Brigham Beatie (USA)

=== Gold medal match ===
19 June 2022; 20:00	Bukovec – Brandie (Canada)	0–2	(Brazil) Duda – Ana Patrícia	Center court Referees: Agnieszka Myszkowska (POL), Nina Hobi (AUT)
19 June 2022; 20:00	(17–21, 19–21); Report			Center court Referees: Agnieszka Myszkowska (POL), Nina Hobi (AUT)

== Final ranking ==
Rank	Team
Gold medal	(Brazil) Duda – Ana Patrícia
Silver medal	(Canada) Bukovec – Brandie
Bronze medal	(Germany) Müller – Tillmann
4	(Switzerland) Heidrich – A. Vergé-Dépré
5	(Australia) Clancy – Mariafe
5	(Canada) Pavan – Melissa
5	(Italy) Menegatti – Gottardi
5	(United States) Kolinske – Hughes
9	(Brazil) Bárbara – Carol
9	(Brazil) Talita – Rebecca
9	(Germany) Borger – Sude
9	(Italy) Scampoli – Bianchin
9	(Latvia) Kravčenoka – Graudiņa
9	(Netherlands) Stam – Schoon
9	(Switzerland) Hüberli – Brunner
9	(United States) Cannon – Sponcil
17	(Argentina) Gallay – Pereyra
17	(Austria) Schützenhöfer – Plesiutschnig
17	(Brazil) Taiana Lima – Hegeile
17	(Canada) Megan – Nicole
17	(China) Wang – Xia
17	(Spain) Carro – Lobato
17	(Finland) Lahti – Ahtiainen
17	(France) Placette – Richard
17	(Germany) Ittlinger – Schneider
17	(Germany) Laboureur – Schulz
17	(Japan) Ishii – Mizoe
17	(Poland) Wojtasik – Kociołek
17	(Switzerland) Böbner – Z. Vergé-Dépré
17	(Thailand) Worapeerachayakorn – Naraphornrapat
17	(United States) Day – Stockman
17	(United States) Flint – Cheng
33	(Chile) Rivas – Vorpahl
33	(Cuba) Leila – Lidy
33	(Mexico) Gutiérrez – Quintero
33	(Paraguay) Erika – Poletti
37	(Australia) Stevens – Johnson
37	(Colombia) Diana – Margarita
37	(Costa Rica) Williams – Núñez
37	(Czech Republic) Hermannová – Williams
37	(Dominican Republic) Payano – Rosario
37	(Ecuador) Ariana – Karelys
37	(Egypt) Farida – Doaa
37	(Italy) Calì – Tega
37	(Italy) R. Orsi Toth – V. Orsi Toth
37	(Kenya) Makokha – Khadambi
37	(Morocco) Zeroual – Mahassine
37	(Mozambique) Sinaportar – Muianga

== See also ==
- 2022 Beach Volleyball World Championships – Men's tournament
