= Brandie =

Brandie or Brandee is a given name. Notable people with that name include:

- Brandie Burton (born 1972), American golfer
- Brandie Coleman (born c. 1985), American murder victim
- Brandie Jay (born 1993), American artistic gymnast
- Brandie O'Connor (born 1973), Australian vision impaired paracyclist
- Brandie Wilkerson (born 1992), Swiss-American, naturalized Canadian volleyball player
- Brandee Younger, American harpist

== See also ==
- Brandi
- Brandy (given name)
