= 2022 Beach Volleyball World Championships =

2022 World Championships
- Venue: Foro Italico
- Location: Rome, Italy
- Dates: 10 – 19 June

Champions
- Men: Norway; Anders Mol; Christian Sørum
- Women: Brazil; Duda Lisboa; Ana Patrícia Ramos

The 2022 Beach Volleyball World Championships were held in Rome, Italy from 10 to 19 June 2022. After the 2022 Russian invasion of Ukraine, FIVB banned all Russian and Belarusian athletes and officials from participating at the championships.

== Competition schedule ==
P	Preliminary round	LL	Lucky losers playoffs	1/16	Round of 32	1/8	Round of 16	1/4	Quarter-finals	1/2	Semi-finals	B	Bronze medal match	F	Final

Date Event	Fri 10	Sat 11	Sun 12	Mon 13	Tue 14	Wed 15	Thu 16	Fri 17	Sat 18	Sun 19	
Men's tournament	P	P	P	P	LL	1/16	1/8	1/4	1/2	B	F
Women's tournament	P	P	P	P	LL	1/16	1/8	1/4	1/2	B	F

== Medal events ==
=== Medal table ===
* Host nation (Italy)

Rank	Nation	Gold	Silver	Bronze	Total
1	Brazil	1	1	1	3
2	Norway	1	0	0	1
3	Canada	0	1	0	1
4	Germany	0	0	1	1
Totals (4 entries)		2	2	2	6

=== Medal summary ===
Event	Gold	Silver	Bronze
Men	Norway; Anders Mol; Christian Sørum	Brazil; Renato Carvalho; Vitor Felipe	Brazil; André Stein; George Wanderley
Women	Brazil; Eduarda Santos Lisboa; Ana Patrícia Ramos	Canada; Sophie Bukovec; Brandie Wilkerson	Germany; Svenja Müller; Cinja Tillmann

== Men's tournament ==
=== Knockout stage bracket ===
Round of 32
15 June
(Italy) Carambula – Rossi	0
(Chile) M. Grimalt – E. Grimalt	2
15 June
(Brazil) Alison – Guto	2
(Spain) Herrera – Gavira	0
15 June
(Austria) Seidl – Waller	2
(United States) Sander – Crabb	1
15 June
(Netherlands) Immers – Boermans	0
(Norway) A. Mol – Sørum	2
15 June
(Brazil) André – George	2
(Australia) McHugh – Burnett	0
15 June
(Norway) Berntsen – H. Mol	0
(Australia) Nicolaidis – Carracher	2
15 June
(Brazil) Bruno Schmidt – Saymon	2
(Latvia) Samoilovs – Šmēdiņš	0
15 June
(Austria) Huber – Dressler	0
(Qatar) Cherif – Ahmed	2
15 June
(Estonia) Nõlvak – Tiisaar	2
(Canada) Schachter – Dearing	0
15 June
(United States) Crabb – Bourne	2
(Netherlands) Luini – Penninga	1
15 June
(Italy) Nicolai – Cottafava	2
(Cuba) Díaz – Alayo	0
15 June
(Brazil) Renato – Vitor Felipe	2
(Czech Republic) Perušič – Schweiner	1
15 June
(Austria) Ermacora – Pristauz	1
(United States) Schalk – Brunner	2
15 June
(Poland) Kantor – Rudol	2
(Germany) Ehlers – Wickler	0
15 June
(Netherlands) Brouwer – Meeuwsen	2
(Netherlands) Varenhorst – Van de Velde	0
15 June
(France) Krou – Gauthier-Rat	0
(Italy) Lupo – Ranghieri	2

Round of 16
16 June
(Chile) M. Grimalt – E. Grimalt	0
(Brazil) Alison – Guto	2
16 June
(Austria) Seidl – Waller	1
(Norway) A. Mol – Sørum	2
16 June
(Brazil) André – George	2
(Australia) Nicolaidis – Carracher	0
16 June
(Brazil) Bruno Schmidt – Saymon	2
(Qatar) Cherif – Ahmed	0
16 June
(Estonia) Nõlvak – Tiisaar	w/o
(United States) Crabb – Bourne
16 June
(Italy) Nicolai – Cottafava	1
(Brazil) Renato – Vitor Felipe	2
16 June
(United States) Schalk – Brunner	2
(Poland) Kantor – Rudol	1
16 June
(Netherlands) Brouwer – Meeuwsen	2
(Italy) Lupo – Ranghieri	0

Quarter-finals
17 June
(Brazil) Alison – Guto	0
(Norway) A. Mol – Sørum	2
17 June
(Brazil) André – George	2
(Brazil) Bruno Schmidt – Saymon	0
17 June
(Estonia) Nõlvak – Tiisaar	0
(Brazil) Renato – Vitor Felipe	2
17 June
(United States) Schalk – Brunner	2
(Netherlands) Brouwer – Meeuwsen	1

Semi-finals
18 June
(Norway) A. Mol – Sørum	2
(Brazil) André – George	0
18 June
(Brazil) Renato – Vitor Felipe	2
(United States) Schalk – Brunner	0

Final
19 June
(Norway) A. Mol – Sørum	2
(Brazil) Renato – Vitor Felipe	0
Third place
19 June
(Brazil) André – George	2
(United States) Schalk – Brunner	1

== Women's tournament ==
=== Knockout stage bracket ===
Round of 32
15 June
(Netherlands) Stam – Schoon	2
(Austria) Schützenhöfer – Plesiutschnig	0
15 June
(Germany) Ittlinger – Schneider	0
(Australia) Clancy – Mariafe	2
15 June
(Germany) Müller – Tillmann	2
(Finland) Lahti – Ahtiainen	1
15 June
(Spain) Carro – Lobato	0
(United States) Cannon – Sponcil	2
15 June
(Canada) Bukovec – Brandie	2
(Thailand) Worapeerachayakorn – Naraphornrapat	1
15 June
(United States) Flint – Cheng	1
(Germany) Borger – Sude	2
15 June
(Argentina) Gallay – Pereyra	0
(Italy) Menegatti – Gottardi	2
15 June
(Italy) Scampoli – Bianchin	2
(Canada) Megan – Nicole	1
15 June
(Switzerland) Heidrich – A. Vergé-Dépré	2
(Switzerland) Böbner – Z. Vergé-Dépré	1
15 June
(Latvia) Kravčenoka – Graudiņa	2
(Poland) Wojtasik – Kociołek	0
15 June
(Switzerland) Hüberli – Brunner	2
(France) Placette – Richard	1
15 June
(United States) Day – Stockman	0
(United States) Kolinske – Hughes	2
15 June
(Brazil) Talita – Rebecca	2
(Germany) Laboureur – Schulz	1
15 June
(Brazil) Taiana Lima – Hegeile	1
(Canada) Pavan – Melissa	2
15 June
(Brazil) Bárbara – Carol	2
(China) Wang – Xia	0
15 June
(Japan) Ishii – Mizoe	0
(Brazil) Duda – Ana Patrícia	2

Round of 16
16 June
(Netherlands) Stam – Schoon	0
(Australia) Clancy – Mariafe	2
16 June
(Germany) Müller – Tillmann	2
(United States) Cannon – Sponcil	1
16 June
(Canada) Bukovec – Brandie	2
(Germany) Borger – Sude	1
16 June
(Italy) Menegatti – Gottardi	2
(Italy) Scampoli – Bianchin	0
16 June
(Switzerland) Heidrich – A. Vergé-Dépré	2
(Latvia) Kravčenoka – Graudiņa	0
16 June
(Switzerland) Hüberli – Brunner	0
(United States) Kolinske – Hughes	2
16 June
(Brazil) Talita – Rebecca	1
(Canada) Pavan – Melissa	2
16 June
(Brazil) Bárbara – Carol	0
(Brazil) Duda – Ana Patrícia	2

Quarter-finals
17 June
(Australia) Clancy – Mariafe	1
(Germany) Müller – Tillmann	2
17 June
(Canada) Bukovec – Brandie	2
(Italy) Menegatti – Gottardi	0
17 June
(Switzerland) Heidrich – A. Vergé-Dépré	2
(United States) Kolinske – Hughes	0
17 June
(Canada) Pavan – Melissa	0
(Brazil) Duda – Ana Patrícia	2

Semi-finals
18 June
(Germany) Müller – Tillmann	1
(Canada) Bukovec – Brandie	2
18 June
(Switzerland) Heidrich – A. Vergé-Dépré	0
(Brazil) Duda – Ana Patrícia	2

Final
19 June
(Canada) Bukovec – Brandie	0
(Brazil) Duda – Ana Patrícia	2
Third place
19 June
(Germany) Müller – Tillmann	2
(Switzerland) Heidrich – A. Vergé-Dépré	1
