= Brandeau =

Brandeau is a surname. Notable people with the surname include:

- Esther Brandeau (born c. 1718), first Jew in Canada
- Margaret Brandeau, American management scientist and engineer

== See also ==
- Brando (disambiguation)
- Suikoden IV, video game featuring an antagonist named Brandeau
