= Brandy City, California =

Unincorporated community in California, United States

- Unincorporated community
- Location within California Location within the United States
- Coordinates: 39°32′16″N 121°01′31″W
- Country: United States
- State: California
- County: Sierra
- Elevation: 3,707 ft (1,130 m)
- Time zone: UTC-8 (Pacific (PST))
  - Summer (DST): UTC-7 (PDT)
- Area code: 530
- GNIS feature ID: 1658126

Brandy City, formerly known as Strychnine City, is an unincorporated community in Sierra County, California, United States, 7.5 miles (12.1 km) west of Goodyears Bar.

The settlement is on Cherokee Creek, a tributary of the North Fork of the Yuba River. Gold was discovered there in 1850 and mined in the 19th century and again in the 1920s. There was a school, and until 1926 a post office.

== See also ==
- California Gold Rush
- List of ghost towns in California
