= Sophie Bukovec =

Canadian beach volleyball player

Personal information
- Born: September 22, 1995 (age 30) Toronto, Ontario, Canada

Sport
- Sport: Beach volleyball
Medal record
Women's Beach volleyball
Representing Canada
World Championships
Silver medal – second place	2022 Rome	Women's

Sophie Bukovec (born September 22, 1995) is a Canadian volleyball athlete competing primarily in the beach discipline.

== Career ==
Bukovec was paired up with Brandie Wilkerson and they would go on to win the silver medal at the 2022 World Championships. Later in 2022, Wilkerson and Bukovec would split, as the former paired up Melissa Humana-Paredes for the 2024 Olympics cycle. Bukovec would go onto pair up Sarah Pavan, Humana-Paredes' former partner. However, their partnership only lasted three tournaments before dissolving.

In 2023, Bukovec reached out to Heather Bansley to pair up, with the latter coming out of retirement to pair up with Bukovec. They competed in their first tournament together in Edmonton in July 2023. The duo would go on to win silver at the 2024 Recife Challenge, as part of the Volleyball World Beach Pro Tour.

In June 2024, Bukovec and Bansley qualified to compete for Canada at the 2024 Summer Olympics.
