= Cinja Tillmann =

German beach volleyball player

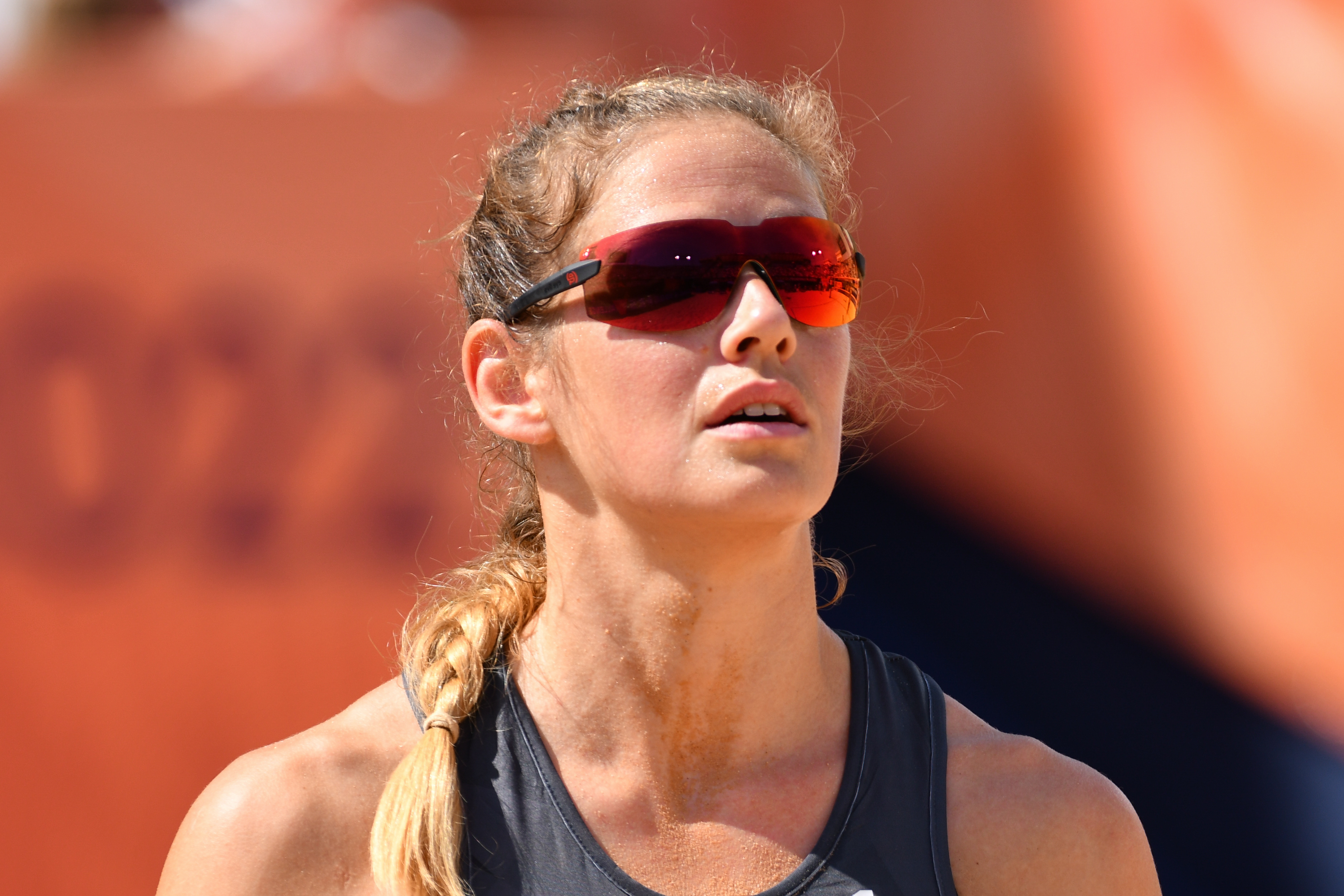
- Tillmann in 2022

Personal information
- Nationality: German
- Born: 13 July 1991 (age 35)
- Height: 174 cm (5 ft 9 in)

Beach volleyball information

Current teammate
Teammate
Svenja Müller
Honours
Women's beach volleyball
Representing Germany
World Championships
Bronze medal – third place	2022 Rome	Women's
European Championships
Gold medal – first place	2024 Netherlands	Women's
Silver medal – second place	2020 Jūrmala	Women's

Cinja Tillmann (born 13 July 1991) is a German beach volleyball player. With Svenja Müller she played at the 2024 Summer Olympics in Paris.
