= Svenja Müller =

German beach volleyball player (born 2001)

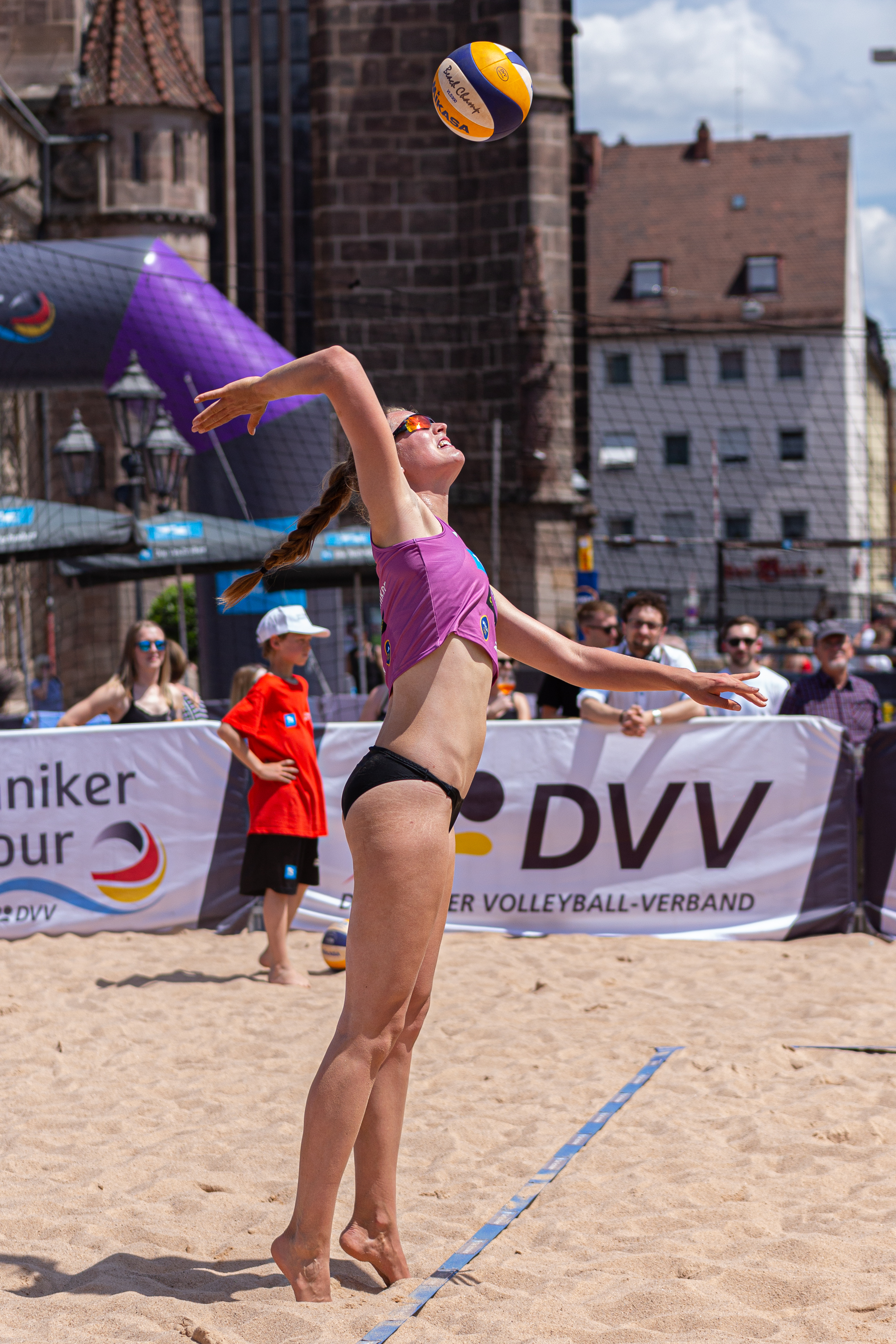
- Müller in 2019

Personal information
- Nationality: German
- Born: 13 February 2001 (age 25); Dortmund, Germany
- Height: 192 cm (6 ft 4 in)

Beach volleyball information

Current teammate
Teammate
Cinja Tillmann
Honours
Women's beach volleyball
Representing Germany
World Championships
Bronze medal – third place	2022 Rome	Beach
European Championships
Gold medal – first place	2024 Netherlands	Beach

Svenja Müller (born 13 February 2001) is a German beach volleyball player. With Cinja Tillmann, she played at the 2024 Summer Olympics in Paris.
