= Brandie Wilkerson =

Canadian beach volleyball player

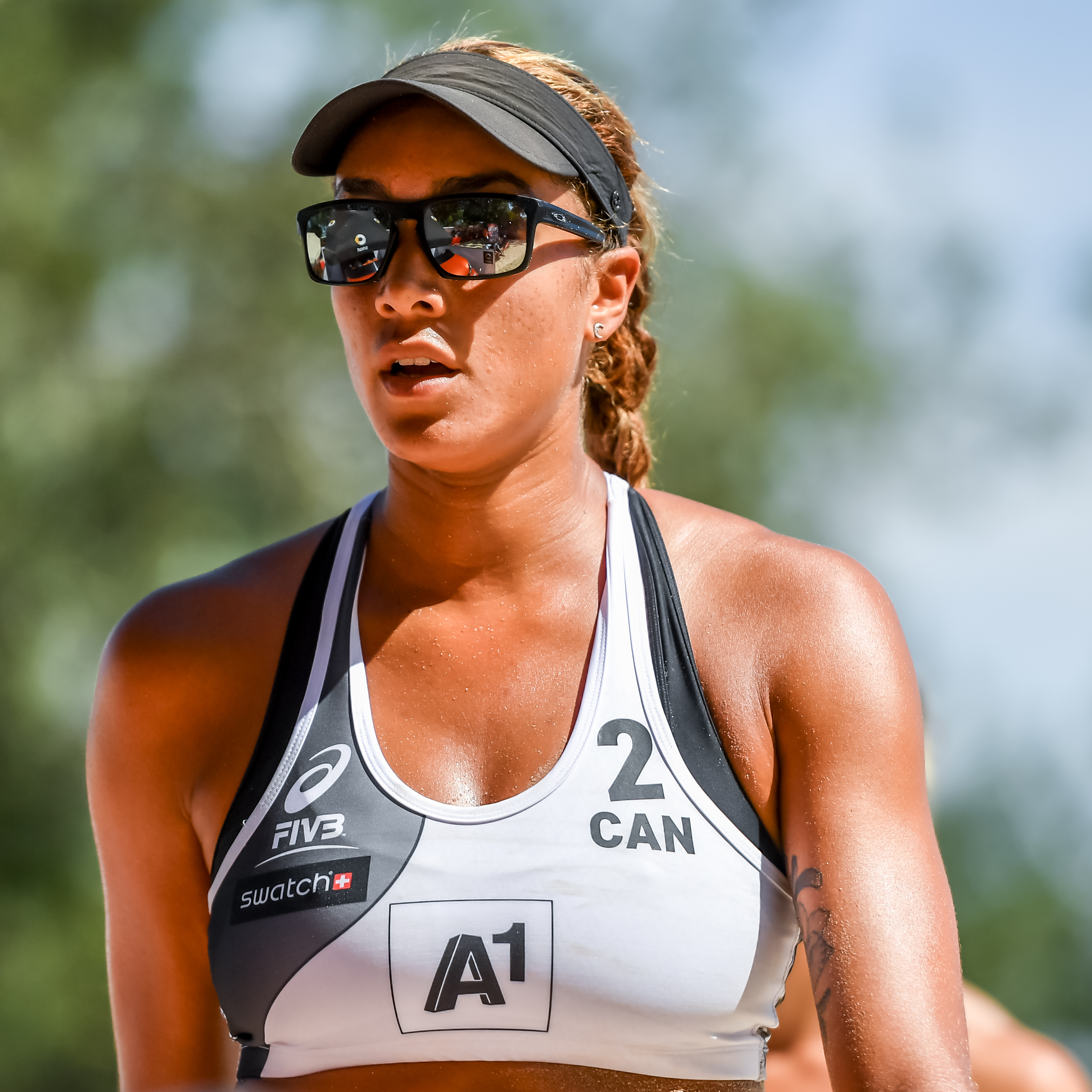
- Wilkerson in 2017

Personal information
- Born: July 1, 1992 (age 34); Lausanne, Switzerland
- Hometown: Toronto, Ontario
- Height: 1.79 m (5 ft 10 in)
- Education: York University

Beach volleyball information

Current teammate
| Years | Teammate |
|---|---|
| 2022–present | Melissa Humana-Paredes |

Previous teammates
Years
- 2013–14
- 2015–16
- 2016–21
- 2022
Teammate
- Claudia Séguin
- Julie Gordon
- Heather Bansley
- Sophie Bukovec

Indoor volleyball information
- Position: Right side/blocker

National team
| Canada |
International medals
Women's beach volleyball
Representing Canada
Olympic Games
| Silver medal – second place | 2024 Paris | Beach |
World Championships
| Silver medal – second place | 2022 Rome | Beach |
Pan American Games
| Silver medal – second place | 2023 Santiago | Beach |
World Tour
| Gold medal – first place | 2018 Warsaw | 4-star |
| Gold medal – first place | 2018 Las Vegas | 4-star |
| Gold medal – first place | 2018 Chetumal | 3-star |
| Silver medal – second place | 2018 Ostrava | 4-star |
| Bronze medal – third place | 2018 Itapema | 4-star |
| Bronze medal – third place | 2018 Gstaad | 5-star |
- Last updated: January 14, 2019

Brandie Wilkerson (born July 1, 1992) is a Canadian beach volleyball player who plays as a right-side blocker. She currently competes with partner Melissa Humaña-Paredes, with whom she won a silver medal at the 2024 Summer Olympics.

With former partner Heather Bansley, she achieved a career-high world ranking of No. 1 in November 2018, and was recognized as the 2018 FIVB Best Blocker for that season. Bansley/Wilkerson represented Canada at the 2020 Summer Olympics. She then competed for one season with Sophie Bukovec, and the pair won silver at the 2022 Beach Volleyball World Championships.

== Early life ==
Wilkerson was born in Switzerland and moved to Canada when she was seven. Her father, Herb Johnson, born Wilkerson, is a former basketball player who was drafted by the Cleveland Cavaliers of the National Basketball Association. He played professionally in France, Spain, Japan, Turkey, and Switzerland. Her mother, Stephanie, was a Swiss national runner and a two-time Ironman finalist. She attended Mayfield Secondary School.

== University career ==
Wilkerson played CIS volleyball for the York Lions from 2010 to 2014. For the 2010–11 season, she was named York's female rookie of the year and was the OUA rookie of the year in women's volleyball. In 2011–12, Wilkerson was named an OUA first-team all-star and was a CIS second-team All-Canadian as she led the OUA with 4.29 points scored per set. She repeated the OUA and CIS awards won in the 2012–13 season and finished with 4.21 points per set and 3.36 kills per set. In her senior year in 2013–14, she was limited to 11 matches due to an injury, but was still named an OUA East second-team all-star while ranking fourth in the OUA with 3.91 points per set.

== International career ==
Wilkerson and Bansley first competed together at the Swatch World Tour finals in Toronto (September 13–18, 2016), where they finished 9th. In 2018, they had a break-out year and closed the season ranked No. 1 on the FIVB world tour.

Wilkerson and Bansley were named as part of the Canadian Olympic team for the 2020 Summer Olympics in Tokyo, one of the nation's two entries in the women's tournament along with the team of Bansley's former partner Sarah Pavan and Melissa Humana-Paredes. Bansley and Wilkerson struggled during pool play, recording two losses and one win, but advanced into the knockout stages due to being one of the top two "Lucky Loser" teams. In the Round of 16 they were the sixteenth seed, but unexpectedly upset the third-seeded American team of Claes/Sponcil by winning two sets to one. In the quarter-final they faced the Latvian team Kravčenoka/Graudiņa, and were eliminated after losing two sets to one.

Following the 2021 season, Wilkerson and Bansley's partnership came to an end, and Wilkerson announced a new partnership with Sophie Bukovec. With limited preseason time, they debuted on the Volleyball World Beach Pro Tour at the Tlaxcala Challenge in March, but did not make it out of qualifying. They would continue to work on "grinding it out" in the following months. Entering the 2022 Beach Volleyball World Championships in Rome as the twentieth seed, Bukovec/Wilkerson went on a run to the women's tournament final, where they took the silver medal after being defeated by Brazil's Lisboa/Ramos. Wilkerson acknowledged after that "of course wanted to walk away with the gold, but again, we're doing the right things and are looking forward to continuing our journey as a team." The two opted to end their season after the Paris Elite16 tournament in late September, from which they were eventually eliminated prior to the quarter-final stage.

On November 1, 2022, Wilkerson announced that she was no longer competing with Bukovec, and had formed a new partnership with Melissa Humana-Paredes, a former teammate during her time playing volleyball at York University. The new team enjoyed success, appearing in ten tournaments in 2023 with no placement lower than fifth. At the 2023 Beach Volleyball World Championships in early October, the duo won five consecutive matches without conceding a set, but were eliminated in the quarter-final by Australians Clancy/Artacho del Solar. They then joined Canada's Pan American Games delegation for the 2023 edition in Santiago. They served as Canada's co-flagbearers in the opening ceremony, and reached the tournament final, losing to Brazil's Lisboa/Ramos.

In June 2024, Humana-Paredes and Wilkerson were officially named to the Canadian team for the 2024 Summer Olympics in Paris. The Olympic tournament began poorly for the team, who lost their first two games in pool play, and reached the knockout stage only via winning a lucky loser playoff against Czechs Hermannová/Štochlová. Humana-Paredes/Wilkerson then managed an upset victory over Nuss/Kloth of the United States in the round of 16, winning two sets to zero, before managing the same against Spaniards Álvarez Mendoza/Moreno in the quarter-final. They became the first Canadian team to reach the semi-finals of an Olympic women's volleyball tournament. Facing the Swiss team Hüberli/Betschart, who had to that point not lost a single set in the tournament, Humana-Paredes/Wilkerson were on the verge of elimination at the end of the second set, but successfully forced a tiebreaker round and won, qualifying for the championship match against Lisboa/Ramos. The championship match went to three sets, a first in Olympic women's beach volleyball, before the Brazilians prevailed. Humana-Paredes and Wilkerson took the silver medal. Humana-Parades' father Hernán said that he felt their victory would have an "even bigger" impact on the sport in Canada than the bronze medal team he had coached in 1996.

Awards
| Preceded by Sarah Pavan (CAN) | Women's FIVB World Tour "Best Blocker"; 2018 | Succeeded by Sarah Pavan (CAN) |
