= Brandy Saturley =

Canadian visual artist

- Born: 1972 (age 53–54); Victoria, British Columbia
- Education: Emily Carr University of Art and Design; Royal College of Art
- Occupation: Artist
- Known for: ICONICCANUCK
- Website: brandysaturley.com

Brandy Saturley (born 1972) is a 21st-century Canadian visual artist best known for her figurative paintings depicting aspects of Canadian culture.

== Early life and education ==
Saturley was born in Victoria, British Columbia in 1972. She was raised on a hobby farm in a fishing community in Sooke, Vancouver Island. She is of Ukrainian, Cornish, and Canadian (Vancouver Island) descent. Her mother was a mixed media artist, and her grandmother was a painter.

Saturley studied visual culture at Emily Carr University of Art and Design, and contemporary art practices at the Royal College of Art in London, England. Saturley is also a graduate of the Victoria Motion Picture School, where she earned a degree in cinema.

== Career ==
Saturley began her career as a visual artist in the mid-1990s and transitioned to full-time work in the early 2000s. Her first public gallery exhibition, Iconic Canuck, was the subject of the 2020 documentary The Iconic Canuck, directed and produced by Randy Frykas.

In 2011, Saturley began her art series Canadianisms. Over the next five years, she explored Canadian culture and landscapes through travels across the country. The resulting exhibition, Canadianisms: A Half Decade Inspired by Canada, toured public galleries in Alberta in 2017.

In 2012, her artwork, Goalie's Mask, was added to the hockey gallery at the Canadian Sports Hall of Fame in Calgary. The painting features Ken Dryden's hockey mask set against a backdrop of the Canadian flag. It was later shortlisted for the Canadian Olympic Committee's trophy for Sport and Art in 2014.

In 2014, Saturley launched the People of Canada Portrait Project, an online exhibition featuring 20 portraits. The project was officially launched in 2020 during the COVID-19 pandemic.

In 2023, Saturley served on the judging panel for the 2023 Canada International Art Competition, funded by the Government of Canada.

In 2025, Saturley published the 112-page artist monograph Painting Canada, which is held in the National Gallery of Canada Library and Archives. That same year, she participated in Winteractive 2025, an outdoor art exhibition in downtown Boston.

Saturley also collaborated with the Canadian rock band The Tragically Hip on the painting Gift Shop, which was used for a poster and limited-edition print series.

== Work ==
Saturley worked on the I See Mountains series, influenced by her ten-day journey through the Canadian Rockies in 2010. The series used horizontal canvases to depict landscapes such as Babel, Rundle, Crowfoot, Mount Assiniboine, and Mount Robson.

Saturley's Canadianisms series, exhibited in cities such as Edmonton and Calgary, reinterprets acclaimed artworks to incorporate Canadian cultural elements, such as hockey masks, into traditional artistic motifs.

In 2018, her painting, Balance, was featured in the Society of Canadian Artists' 50th Open International Exhibition in Toronto. The work explored landscape themes, blending elements of realism and abstraction.

== Selected exhibitions ==
- #ICONICCANUCK, CARFAC Alberta Gallery at Harcourt House, 2013
- Canadianisms: A Half Decade Inspired by Canada, Okotoks Art Gallery, 2017
- Half Decade inspired by Canada, Gallery @501 in Strathcona County, 2017

== Permanent collections ==
- Canadian Tire Corporation
- Canadian Sports Hall of Fame
- Colart Collection (Rossy Family Trust)
- Banff & Lake Louise Tourism
