= Brandy Hill, Wales =

Hill (206m) in Carmarthenshire, Wales

Brandy Hill
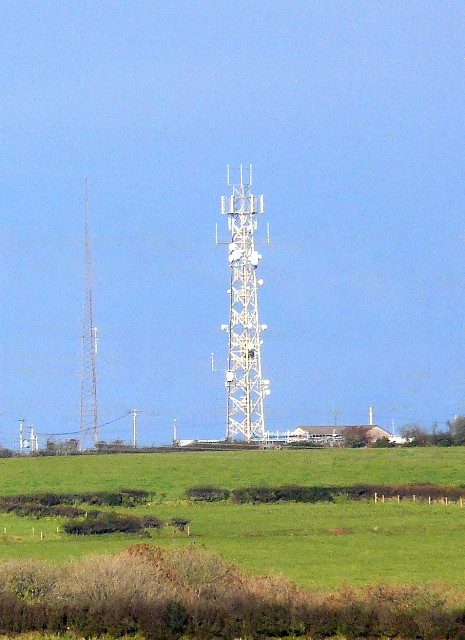

Highest point
- Elevation: 206 m (676 ft)
- Prominence: 152 m (499 ft)
- Parent peak: Foel Cwmcerwyn
- Listing: Marilyn
- Coordinates: 51.7907°N 4.5919°W

Geography
- Location: Carmarthenshire, Wales
- OS grid: SN213133

Brandy Hill is a hill in South Wales between Pendine and Whitland, and south-west of St. Clears. At the summit stand a radio transmitter and a trig point.
