= Brandi =

Brandi is both a surname and a given name.

== Surname ==
- Alan Brandi (born 1987), Argentine futsal player
- Albrecht Brandi (1914–1966), German World War II U-boat commander
- Cesare Brandi (1906–1988), Italian art historian
- Ernst Brandi (1875–1937), German mining-engineer and industrial-manager
- Karl Brandi (1868–1946), German historian
- Nunzio Brandi (born 2001), Italian footballer
- Piero Brandi (1939–2004), Italian boxer
- Tom Brandi (born 1966), ring name Salvatore Sincere, American professional wrestler

== Given name ==
- Brandi Carlile (born 1981), American singer and songwriter
- Brandi Chastain (born 1968), American soccer player
- Brandi Cossairt (born 1984), American chemist
- Brandi Glanville (born 1972), American model and television personality
- Brandi McCain (born 1979), American former basketball player
- Brandi Poole, American basketball coach
- Brandi Rhodes (born 1983), American professional wrestler
- Brandi Shearer (born 1980), American singer and songwriter

== See also ==
- Brandie
- Brandy (given name)
