= Brando (surname) =

Brando is a surname of Italian origin. Notable people with the surname include:

- Frédéric Brando (born 1973), French footballer
- Jessica Brando (born 1994), Italian singer
- Jocelyn Brando (1919–2007), American actress
- Luisina Brando (born 1945), Argentine actress
- Marlon Brando (1924–2004), American actor, brother of Jocelyn
  - Cheyenne Brando (1970–1995), daughter of Marlon
  - Christian Brando (1958–2008), son of Marlon
  - Miko Brando, son of Marlon
- Marlon Brando (1979–2001), American rapper
- Tim Brando (born 1956), American sports reporter and announcer

The surname Brando may also refer to:

- Dio Brando, fictional antagonist in Hirohiko Araki's manga JoJo's Bizarre Adventure
