= Sarah Sponcil =

American beach volleyball player

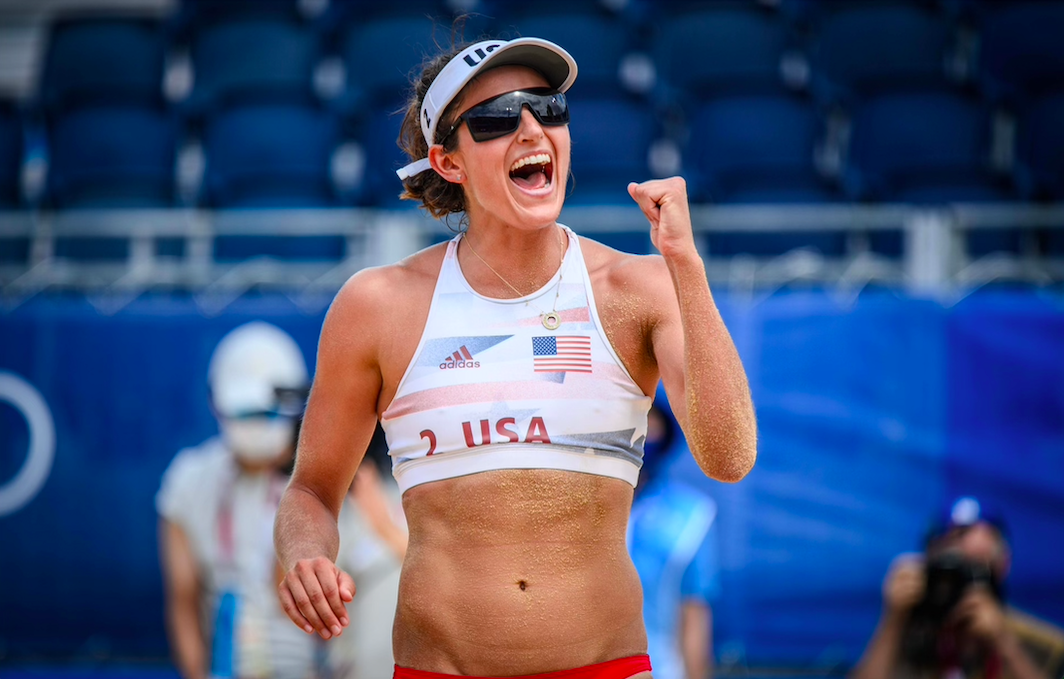

Personal information
- Full name: Sarah Marie Sponcil
- National team: United States
- Born: August 16, 1996 (age 29) Phoenix, Arizona, U.S.
- Height: 5 ft 9 in (175 cm)
- Website: www.sarahsponcil.com

Sport
- Sport: Beach volleyball
- University team: LMU Lions (2014-16) / UCLA Bruins (2017)
- League: AVP
- Turned pro: 2018
- Partner: Terese Cannon
- Former partner: Kelly Cheng

Achievements and titles
- Olympic finals: Tokyo 2020
- Highest world ranking: 6
- Personal best(s): 2021 Sochi, 2021 Ostrava; 2019 The Hague, 2019 Espinho, 2022 Cape Town, 2023 Ostrava; 2018 Haiyang, 2019 Qinzhou, 2022 Kuşadası, 2023 Itapema

Sarah Marie Sponcil (born August 16, 1996, in Phoenix, Arizona) is an American volleyball player for the San Diego Mojo of the Pro Volleyball Federation, best known for her beach volleyball career. She competed for the USA Volleyball Beach National Team in the 2020 Tokyo Olympic Games. Sarah and partner Kelly Claes tied for 9th in their debut Olympics. At 24 and 25, Sponcil and Claes, respectively, were the youngest beach volleyball team to represent the USA since its inception as an Olympic sport in 1996.

== Early life ==
Sponcil grew up in Phoenix, Arizona, where she began playing indoor volleyball at age 6 and beach volleyball at 8. She led Veritas Preparatory Academy's indoor volleyball team to three state championship titles, winning Arizona Gatorade Player of the Year honors in both 2012 and 2013.

Playing for Team USA at the Four Nations U21 Tournament in Australia, Sarah and her partner Torrey Van Winden went 4–0 against Team Brazil to win Gold. In the same year, the duo finished fourth at the 2016 FIVB U21 World Championships, delivering the highest placement at the event for USA Volleyball.

== College ==
Sponcil played three seasons of indoor volleyball at Loyola Marymount, where she was the 2016 West Coast Conference Defensive Player of the Year and the school's Female Athlete of the Year. She transferred to UCLA for her senior season, where she played both indoor and beach. She led the Bruins to their first-ever NCAA Beach Volleyball Championship in May 2018 and then again in 2019.

Sponcil was a two-sport Division I Student-Athlete; she played two years of beach and three years of indoor volleyball at Loyola Marymount University where she was 2016 West Coast Conference Defensive Player of the Year and LMU's Female Athlete of the Year. In just three seasons at LMU, Sponcil ranks in LMU history as seventh all-time for attacks (3,063) and ninth all-time for kills (1,193) and kills per set (3.43 per set); she also had 963 digs (2.77 per set) and 76 service aces. With numerous All-American, All-Region, All-WCC, All-Freshman and All-AVCA honors, Sponcil guided the LMU Lions to the 2014 NCAA Tournament and to the 2015 NCAA Sweet Sixteen. Sponcil took a red-shirt year from LMU Beach in 2016 to represent USA Volleyball at the Four Nations U21 Tournament in Sydney, Australia, where she won Gold.

Sponcil transferred to UCLA in 2017, where she played her last season of indoor eligibility in 2017. She also played beach volleyball, and as a Junior in 2018 and Senior in 2019, she helped propel the Bruins to their first Beach National Title in 2018 and then again in 2019. Sponcil garnered numerous honors at UCLA, including First Team Pac-12, Court Two Team of the Year with Lily Justine, and AVCA Collegiate Beach Volleyball All-American.

== Professional career ==
Sponcil joined the AVP in 2018, partnering with former USC Trojan Kelly Cheng. Sponcil and Cheng quickly rose through the ranks, winning two consecutive FIVB World Tour titles in early 2021 and qualifying for the Tokyo Olympics.

Sponcil has partnered successfully with a handful of players in off-season play and on the AVP and FIVB Tours. In the run-up to the Tokyo Games, she partnered with Cheng and the duo had notable wins and honors:

2021: The duo took Gold at Ostrava and Gold at Sochi, finishing 2021 ranked 5th in the world in nine games on the FIVB International Tour; they also ended the year 5th in the US on the AVP Tour, with wins at second, third and seventh. Their qualifying wins at Sochi and then Ostrava, where Sponcil and Cheng defeated longtime Olympic champions Kerri Walsh and Brooke Sweat, clinched them the number two spot for Team USA for the Tokyo Games.

2020: Sponcil and Cheng played twice on the abbreviated 2020 FIVB tour, placing fifth and ninth, ending the year ranking 14th in the world; they delivered second, third and fifth placements in the abbreviated 2020 AVP Tour, where Sponcil tied fifth for digs, with 6.7 per set. Of note, four of their five losses on the year were to teams seeded first or second.

2019: Fresh out of UCLA in 2019, Sponcil made her mark as one of the best defenders on the AVP and FIVB Tours. Sponcil and Cheng played in 14 FIVB Tournaments, winning Silver at The Hague and Silver at Espinho, Portugal, finishing the year with an overall FIVB rank of 14th. In the 2019 AVP season, Sponcil and Cheng finished 17th overall; in four AVP events, they advanced to the semi-finals four times and to the championship match once, with Sponcil delivering an average of 4.98 digs per set on the season. Six of their eight AVP losses were to teams seeded first or second.

In 2022, she partnered with Terese Cannon for the AVP and FIVB Tours.

In 2024, Sponcil played for the Grand Rapids Rise of the Pro Volleyball Federation in their inaugural 2024 season. She then signed with the San Diego Mojo for the 2025 season.
