= Beach volleyball at the 2024 Summer Olympics – Women's qualification =

The women's qualification for the Olympic beach volleyball tournament will occur between January 2023 and June 2024. The competition will comprise a total of 24 women's beach volleyball pairs coming from different NOCs, similar to those in the previous editions; each NOC can enter a maximum of two pairs in the women's tournament. As the host nation, France reserves the direct spot for the women's beach volleyball pair.

The remainder of the twenty-four team field must endure a tripartite qualification pathway to obtain a ticket for Paris 2024, abiding by the universality principle and respecting the two-pair NOC limit. The initial spot was directly awarded to the women's winners, respectively, from the 2023 FIVB Beach Volleyball World Championships, scheduled from 6 to 15 October in Mexico, with the seventeen highest-ranked eligible women's pairs joining them in the field through the FIVB Olympic ranking list (based on the twelve best performances achieved as a pair) between 1 January 2023 and 9 June 2024. The events valid for ranking results include but are not limited to the following:

- 2023 FIVB Beach Volleyball World Championships
- 2023–2024 Beach Pro Tour (Elite, Challenge, Future, and Finals)
- 2023–2024 FIVB Continental Tours Finals

The final five spots will be attributed to the highest-ranked eligible NOCs from each of the five continental qualification tournaments, namely the AVC Continental Cup Final for Asia and Oceania; the CAVB Continental Cup Final for Africa; the CEV Continental Cup Final for Europe; the CSV Continental Cup Final for South America; and the NORCECA Continental Cup Final for North America, Central America, and the Caribbean. The final phase of these five events will occur between 13 and 23 June 2024.

== Qualification summary ==
Qualification	Date	Host	Berths	Qualified NOC
Host nation	—		1	France
2023 FIVB Beach Volleyball World Championships	6–15 October 2023	(Mexico) Tlaxcala	1	United States
FIVB Beach Volleyball Olympic Ranking	9 June 2024	(Switzerland) Lausanne	17	Brazil
FIVB Beach Volleyball Olympic Ranking	9 June 2024	(Switzerland) Lausanne	17	United States
FIVB Beach Volleyball Olympic Ranking	9 June 2024	(Switzerland) Lausanne	17	Canada
FIVB Beach Volleyball Olympic Ranking	9 June 2024	(Switzerland) Lausanne	17	Brazil
FIVB Beach Volleyball Olympic Ranking	9 June 2024	(Switzerland) Lausanne	17	Netherlands
FIVB Beach Volleyball Olympic Ranking	9 June 2024	(Switzerland) Lausanne	17	Switzerland
FIVB Beach Volleyball Olympic Ranking	9 June 2024	(Switzerland) Lausanne	17	Latvia
FIVB Beach Volleyball Olympic Ranking	9 June 2024	(Switzerland) Lausanne	17	China
FIVB Beach Volleyball Olympic Ranking	9 June 2024	(Switzerland) Lausanne	17	Italy
FIVB Beach Volleyball Olympic Ranking	9 June 2024	(Switzerland) Lausanne	17	Germany
FIVB Beach Volleyball Olympic Ranking	9 June 2024	(Switzerland) Lausanne	17	Australia
FIVB Beach Volleyball Olympic Ranking	9 June 2024	(Switzerland) Lausanne	17	Switzerland
FIVB Beach Volleyball Olympic Ranking	9 June 2024	(Switzerland) Lausanne	17	Spain
FIVB Beach Volleyball Olympic Ranking	9 June 2024	(Switzerland) Lausanne	17	Germany
FIVB Beach Volleyball Olympic Ranking	9 June 2024	(Switzerland) Lausanne	17	France
FIVB Beach Volleyball Olympic Ranking	9 June 2024	(Switzerland) Lausanne	17	Lithuania
FIVB Beach Volleyball Olympic Ranking	9 June 2024	(Switzerland) Lausanne	17	Spain
2023–2024 CEV Continental Cup Final	13–16 June 2024	(Latvia) Jūrmala	1	Czech Republic^{a}
2023–2024 CSV Continental Cup Final	14–16 June 2024	(Paraguay) Asunción	1	Paraguay
2023–2024 CAVB Continental Cup Final	20–23 June 2024	Martil	1	Egypt
2023–2024 AVC Continental Cup Final	21–23 June 2024	(China) Ningbo	1	Japan
2023–2024 NORCECA Continental Cup Final	21–23 June 2024	Tlaxcala	1	Canada
Total			24	

Notes
^{a} The Netherlands originally won the CEV Continental Cup. However, there was no athlete who met the requirements set by the Dutch NOC. Therefore, the NOC forfeited quota spot, and the Czech Republic as the runners-up received the reallocated quota spot.

== Host country ==
FIVB reserved a berth for the 2024 Summer Olympics host country to participate in the beach volleyball tournament.

- France

== 2023 FIVB Beach Volleyball World Championships ==
The winning women's pair of the 2023 FIVB Beach Volleyball World Championships, scheduled from 6 to 15 October in Mexico, secured a spot for Paris 2024.

=== Bracket ===
Round of 32
11 October
(Brazil) Ana Patrícia – Duda	2
(Lithuania) Paulikienė – Raupelytė	0
11 October
(China) Xue – Xia	2
(Thailand) Naraphornrapat – Worapeerachayakorn	0
11 October
(United States) Cannon – Kraft	2
(Brazil) Andressa – Vitória	1
11 October
(Spain) Álvarez – Moreno	0
(Netherlands) Stam – Schoon	2
11 October
(Australia) Mariafe – Clancy	2
(Germany) Ittlinger – Borger	0
11 October
(Italy) Gottardi – Menegatti	2
(Switzerland) Vergé-Dépré – Mäder	0
11 October
(Switzerland) Esmée – Zoé	2
(France) Placette – Richard	0
11 October
(Finland) Ahtiainen – Lahti	0
(Canada) Melissa – Brandie	2
11 October
(United States) Hughes – Cheng	2
(Austria) D. Klinger – R. Klinger	1
11 October
(Latvia) Tīna – Anastasija	2
(China) Dong – Wang	0
11 October
(Germany) Müller – Tillmann	2
(Spain) Liliana – Paula	0
11 October
(Brazil) Tainá – Victória	2
(Brazil) Carol – Bárbara	1
11 October
(Switzerland) Hüberli – Betschart	2
(Poland) Gruszczyńska – Wachowicz	0
11 October
(Czech Republic) Hermannová – Štochlová	0
(United States) Scoles – Flint	2
11 October
(Brazil) Ágatha – Rebecca	2
(Germany) Ludwig – Lippmann	1
11 October
(Canada) Pavan – McBain	0
(United States) Nuss – Kloth	2

Round of 16
12 October
(Brazil) Ana Patrícia – Duda	2
(China) Xue – Xia	0
12 October
(United States) Cannon – Kraft	0
(Netherlands) Stam – Schoon	2
12 October
(Australia) Mariafe – Clancy	2
(Italy) Gottardi – Menegatti	1
12 October
(Switzerland) Esmée – Zoé	0
(Canada) Melissa – Brandie	2
12 October
(United States) Hughes – Cheng	2
(Latvia) Tīna – Anastasija	1
12 October
(Germany) Müller – Tillmann	1
(Brazil) Tainá – Victória	2
12 October
(Switzerland) Hüberli – Betschart	2
(United States) Scoles – Flint	0
12 October
(Brazil) Ágatha – Rebecca	0
(United States) Nuss – Kloth	2

Quarter-finals
13 October
(Brazil) Ana Patrícia – Duda	2
(Netherlands) Stam – Schoon	0
13 October
(Australia) Mariafe – Clancy	2
(Canada) Melissa – Brandie	0
13 October
(United States) Hughes – Cheng	2
(Brazil) Tainá – Victória	0
13 October
(Switzerland) Hüberli – Betschart	1
(United States) Nuss – Kloth	2

Semi-finals
14 October
(Brazil) Ana Patrícia – Duda	2
(Australia) Mariafe – Clancy	0
14 October
(United States) Hughes – Cheng	2
(United States) Nuss – Kloth	1

Final
15 October
(Brazil) Ana Patrícia – Duda	0
(United States) Hughes – Cheng	2
Third place
15 October
(Australia) Mariafe – Clancy	1
(United States) Nuss – Kloth	2

=== Rankings ===
Rank	Country	Players
1st place, gold medalist(s)	United States	Sara Hughes – Kelly Cheng
2nd place, silver medalist(s)	Brazil	Ana Patrícia Ramos – Eduarda Santos Lisboa
3rd place, bronze medalist(s)	United States	Kristen Nuss – Taryn Kloth
4	Australia	Mariafe Artacho del Solar – Taliqua Clancy
5	Brazil	Tainá Silva Bigi – Victória Lopes
5	Canada	Melissa Humana-Paredes – Brandie Wilkerson
5	Netherlands	Katja Stam – Raïsa Schoon
5	Switzerland	Tanja Hüberli – Nina Betschart
9	Brazil	Ágatha Bednarczuk – Rebecca Cavalcante
9	China	Xue Chen – Xia Xinyi
9	Germany	Svenja Müller – Cinja Tillmann
9	Italy	Valentina Gottardi – Marta Menegatti
9	Latvia	Tīna Graudiņa – Anastasija Kravčenoka
9	Switzerland	Esmée Böbner – Zoé Vergé-Dépré
9	United States	Terese Cannon – Megan Kraft
9	United States	Julia Scoles – Betsi Flint
17	Austria	Dorina Klinger – Ronja Klinger
17	Brazil	Andressa Cavalcanti – Vitória Rodrigues
17	Brazil	Carolina Solberg Salgado – Bárbara Seixas
17	Canada	Sarah Pavan – Molly McBain
17	China	Dong Jie – Wang Fan
17	Czech Republic	Barbora Hermannová – Marie-Sára Štochlová
17	Finland	Niina Ahtiainen – Taru Lahti-Liukkonen
17	France	Lézana Placette – Alexia Richard
17	Germany	Sandra Ittlinger – Karla Borger
17	Germany	Laura Ludwig – Louisa Lippmann
17	Lithuania	Monika Paulikienė – Ainė Raupelytė
17	Poland	Jagoda Gruszczyńska – Aleksandra Wachowicz
17	Spain	Daniela Álvarez Mendoza – Tania Moreno
17	Spain	Liliana Fernández – Paula Soria Gutiérrez
17	Switzerland	Anouk Vergé-Dépré – Joana Mäder
17	Thailand	Taravadee Naraphornrapat – Worapeerachayakorn Kongphopsarutawadee

Qualified for the 2024 Summer Olympics

== 2023–2024 FIVB Olympic Rankings ==
The seventeen highest-ranked eligible women's pairs will secure a direct spot for Paris 2024 based on the FIVB Olympic ranking points accrued in the twelve best performances as a pair from 1 January 2023 to 9 June 2024. The events valid for ranking results include but are not limited to the following:

- 2023 FIVB Beach Volleyball World Championships
- 2023–2024 Beach Pro Tour (Elite, Challenge, Future, and Finals)
- 2023–2024 FIVB Continental Tours Finals

Qualified directly for the 2024 Summer Olympics
Qualified as world champions for the 2024 Summer Olympics
Ineligible because of the two-pair NOC limit

No.	Rank	Players	NOC	FIVB Points	NOC Rank
1	1	Eduarda Santos Lisboa – Ana Patrícia Ramos	Brazil	13,160	1
2	2	Kristen Nuss – Taryn Kloth	United States	11,960	1
3 (WC)	3	Sara Hughes – Kelly Cheng	United States	11,400	2
4	4	Melissa Humana-Paredes – Brandie Wilkerson	Canada	10,720	1
5	5	Carolina Solberg Salgado – Bárbara Seixas	Brazil	10,440	2
6	6	Katja Stam – Raïsa Schoon	Netherlands	10,380	1
7	7	Tanja Hüberli – Nina Brunner	Switzerland	10,160	1
8	8	Tīna Graudiņa – Anastasija Kravčenoka	Latvia	9,560	1
9	9	Xia Xinyi – Xue Chen	China	9,400	1
10	10	Valentina Gottardi – Marta Menegatti	Italy	9,140	1
11	11	Svenja Müller – Cinja Tillmann	Germany	8,920	1
12		Tainá Bigi – Victória Lopes	Brazil	8,480	
13	12	Taliqua Clancy – Mariafe Artacho del Solar	Australia	8,440	1
14		Ágatha Bednarczuk – Rebecca Cavalcante	Brazil	8,260	
15	13	Esmée Böbner – Zoé Vergé-Dépré	Switzerland	7,900	2
16	14	Daniela Álvarez Mendoza – Tania Moreno	Spain	7,820	1
17	15	Laura Ludwig – Louisa Lippmann	Germany	7,720	2
18		Anouk Vergé-Dépré – Joana Mäder	Switzerland	7,580	
19		Sandra Ittlinger – Karla Borger	Germany	7,360	
20		Julia Scoles – Betsi Flint	United States	7,340	
21	16	Lézana Placette – Alexia Richard	France	6,920	1
22	17	Monika Paulikienė – Ainė Raupelytė	Lithuania	6,900	1
23	18	Liliana Fernández – Paula Soria	Spain	6,800	2
24		Sarah Pavan – Molly McBain	Canada	6,660	
25		Niina Ahtiainen – Taru Lahti-Liukkonen	Finland	6,420	

== Continental Cup Final ==
The final five spots will be attributed to the highest-ranked eligible NOCs from each of the five continental qualification tournaments (Africa; Asia and Oceania; Europe; North America, Central America, and the Caribbean; and South America). The final phase of these five events will occur between 13 and 23 June 2024.

=== Africa ===
The winning NOC of the 2024 CAVB Beach Volleyball Continental Cup, scheduled from 20 to 23 June in Martil, Morocco, secured a spot for Paris 2024.

==== Bracket ====
Quarterfinals
22 June 2024
Morocco	2
Kenya	0
22 June 2024
Mauritius	0
Egypt	2
22 June 2024
Cape Verde	2
Ghana	0
22 June 2024
Rwanda	0
Nigeria	2

Semifinals
23 June 2024
Morocco	0
Egypt	2
23 June 2024
Cape Verde	0
Nigeria	2

Final
23 June 2024
Egypt	2
Nigeria	1

==== Rankings ====
Rank	Country
1	Egypt
2	Nigeria
3	Cape Verde
3	Morocco
5	Ghana
5	Kenya
5	Mauritius
5	Rwanda

Qualified for the 2024 Summer Olympics

=== Asia and Oceania ===
The winning NOC of the 2024 AVC Beach Volleyball Continental Cup Final, scheduled from 21 to 23 June in Ningbo, China, secured a spot for Paris 2024.

==== Bracket ====
Quarterfinals
21 June
New Zealand	2
Vanuatu	0
21 June
China	2
Lebanon	0
21 June
Japan	2
Indonesia	0
21 June
Thailand	2
Kazakhstan	0

Semifinals
22 June
New Zealand	1
China	2
22 June
Japan	2
Thailand	0

Final
23 June
China	1
Japan	2

==== Rankings ====
Rank	Country
1	Japan
2	China
3	New Zealand
3	Thailand
5	Indonesia
5	Kazakhstan
5	Lebanon
5	Vanuatu

Qualified for the 2024 Summer Olympics

=== Europe ===
The winning NOC of the 2024 CEV Beach Volley Nations Cup Final, scheduled from 13 to 16 June in Jūrmala, Latvia, secured a spot for Paris 2024.

==== Bracket ====
Quarterfinals
14 June
Ukraine	0
Austria	2
14 June
Poland	1 (11)
Netherlands (ags)	1 (15)
14 June
Finland	0
Czech Republic	2
14 June
Italy	2
Lithuania	0

Semifinals
15 June
Austria	1 (17)
Netherlands (ags)	1 (19)
15 June
Czech Republic	2
Italy	0

Final
16 June
Netherlands	2
Czech Republic	0

==== Rankings ====
Rank	Country
1	Netherlands
2	Czech Republic
3	Austria
3	Italy
5	Finland
5	Lithuania
5	Poland
5	Ukraine

Qualified for the 2024 Summer Olympics

=== North America, Central America, and the Caribbean ===
The winning NOC of the 2024 NORCECA Beach Volleyball Tour Finals, scheduled from 21 to 23 June in Tlaxcala, Mexico, secured a spot for Paris 2024.

==== Bracket ====
Quarterfinals
22 June
Canada	2
Virgin Islands	0
22 June
Puerto Rico	2
Nicaragua	0
22 June
Mexico	2
Costa Rica	0
22 June
Guatemala	0
Dominican Republic	2

Semifinals
23 June
Canada	2
Puerto Rico	0
23 June
Mexico	2
Dominican Republic	0

Final
23 June
Canada	2
Mexico	0

==== Rankings ====
Rank	Country
1	Canada
2	Mexico
3	Puerto Rico
4	Dominican Republic
5	Nicaragua
6	Guatemala
7	Costa Rica
8	Virgin Islands

Qualified for the 2024 Summer Olympics

=== South America ===
The winning NOC of the 2024 CSV Clasificatório Olímpico, scheduled from 14 to 16 June in Asunción, Paraguay, secured a spot for Paris 2024.

==== Bracket ====
Semifinals
15 June
Argentina	3
Ecuador	0
15 June
Peru	1
Paraguay	3

Final
16 June
Argentina	1
Paraguay	3

==== Rankings ====
Rank	Country
1	Paraguay
2	Argentina
3	Ecuador
3	Peru
5	Chile
5	Uruguay

Qualified for the 2024 Summer Olympics
