= Beach volleyball at the 2024 Summer Olympics – Women's tournament =

Women's beach volleyball at the Games of the XXXIII Olympiad
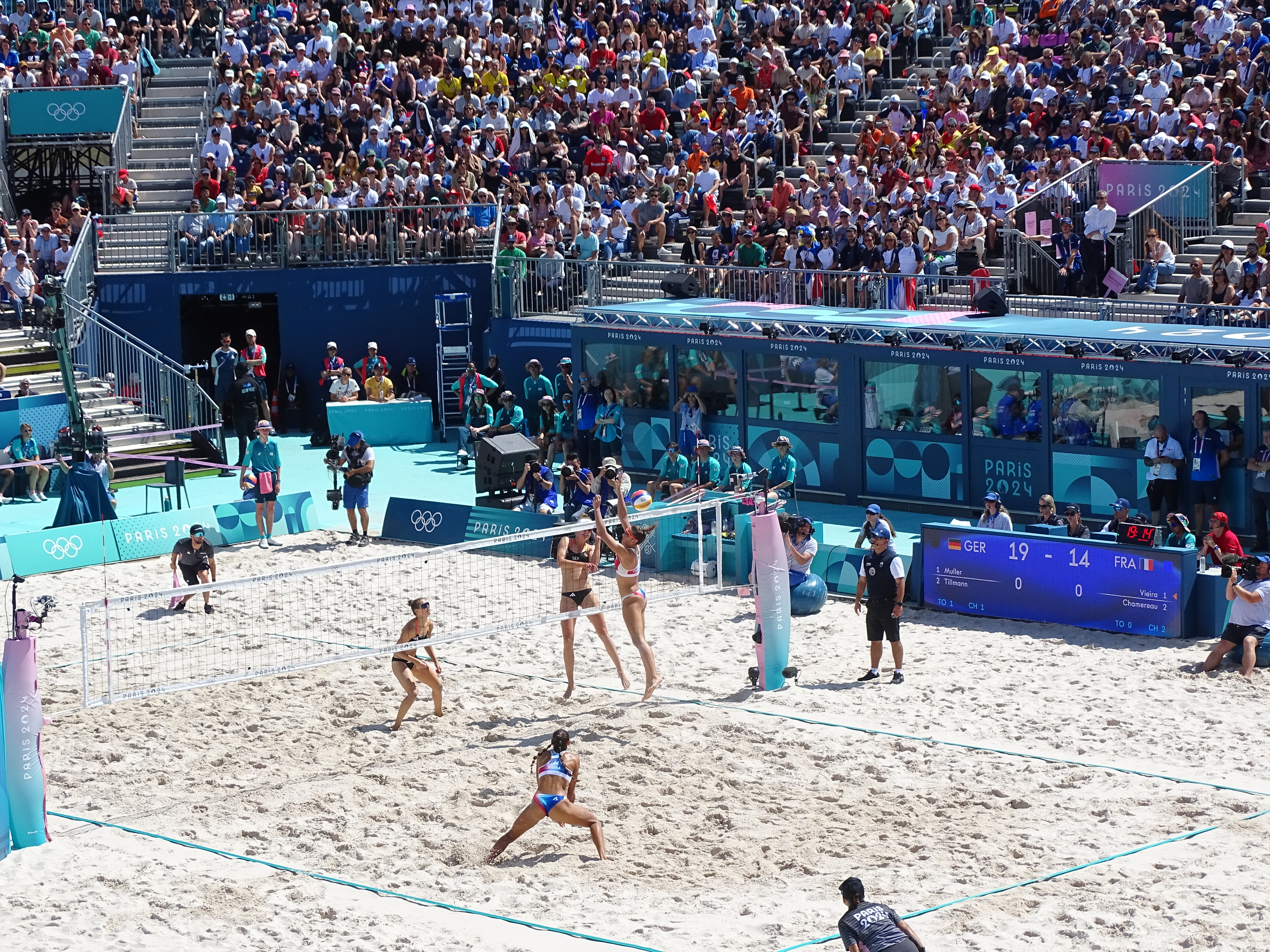
- Chamereau and Vieira of France face Müller and Tillmann of Germany in the group stage.
- Venue: Eiffel Tower Stadium Champ de Mars
- Dates: 27 July – 9 August
- Competitors: 48 from 17 nations

Medalists
1st place, gold medalist(s)		Ana Patrícia; Duda Lisboa	Brazil
2nd place, silver medalist(s)		Melissa Humana-Paredes; Brandie Wilkerson	Canada
3rd place, bronze medalist(s)		Tanja Hüberli; Nina Brunner	Switzerland

The women's beach volleyball tournament at the 2024 Olympic Games in Paris, France, took place at Eiffel Tower Stadium on the Champ de Mars. The competition was held from 27 July to 9 August 2024. Twenty-four teams consisting of 48 athletes from 17 NOCs competed.

== Qualification ==
Qualification	Date	Host	Berths	Qualified NOC
Host nation	—N/a		1	France
2023 FIVB Beach Volleyball World Championships	6–15 October 2023	(Mexico) Tlaxcala	1	United States
FIVB Beach Volleyball Olympic Ranking	9 June 2024	(Switzerland) Lausanne	17	Brazil
FIVB Beach Volleyball Olympic Ranking	9 June 2024	(Switzerland) Lausanne	17	United States
FIVB Beach Volleyball Olympic Ranking	9 June 2024	(Switzerland) Lausanne	17	Canada
FIVB Beach Volleyball Olympic Ranking	9 June 2024	(Switzerland) Lausanne	17	Brazil
FIVB Beach Volleyball Olympic Ranking	9 June 2024	(Switzerland) Lausanne	17	Netherlands
FIVB Beach Volleyball Olympic Ranking	9 June 2024	(Switzerland) Lausanne	17	Switzerland
FIVB Beach Volleyball Olympic Ranking	9 June 2024	(Switzerland) Lausanne	17	Latvia
FIVB Beach Volleyball Olympic Ranking	9 June 2024	(Switzerland) Lausanne	17	China
FIVB Beach Volleyball Olympic Ranking	9 June 2024	(Switzerland) Lausanne	17	Italy
FIVB Beach Volleyball Olympic Ranking	9 June 2024	(Switzerland) Lausanne	17	Germany
FIVB Beach Volleyball Olympic Ranking	9 June 2024	(Switzerland) Lausanne	17	Australia
FIVB Beach Volleyball Olympic Ranking	9 June 2024	(Switzerland) Lausanne	17	Switzerland
FIVB Beach Volleyball Olympic Ranking	9 June 2024	(Switzerland) Lausanne	17	Spain
FIVB Beach Volleyball Olympic Ranking	9 June 2024	(Switzerland) Lausanne	17	Germany
FIVB Beach Volleyball Olympic Ranking	9 June 2024	(Switzerland) Lausanne	17	France
FIVB Beach Volleyball Olympic Ranking	9 June 2024	(Switzerland) Lausanne	17	Lithuania
FIVB Beach Volleyball Olympic Ranking	9 June 2024	(Switzerland) Lausanne	17	Spain
2023–2024 CEV Continental Cup Final	13–16 June 2024	(Latvia) Jūrmala	1	Czech Republic^{a}
2023–2024 CSV Continental Cup Final	14–16 June 2024	(Paraguay) Asunción	1	Paraguay
2023–2024 CAVB Continental Cup Final	20–23 June 2024	Martil	1	Egypt
2023–2024 AVC Continental Cup Final	21–23 June 2024	(China) Ningbo	1	Japan
2023–2024 NORCECA Continental Cup Final	21–23 June 2024	Tlaxcala	1	Canada
Total			24	

Notes
^{a} The Netherlands originally won the CEV Continental Cup. However, there was no athlete who met the requirements set by the Dutch NOC. Therefore, the NOC forfeited quota spot, and the Czech Republic as the runners-up received the reallocated quota spot.

== Format ==
The 24 teams were split into six pools of four teams. After a round-robin the top two teams and the two best third-placed teams advanced to the knockout stage. The other four third-placed teams played in a "lucky loser" round to determine the last two qualifying teams. From there on, a knockout stage was used.

A win was awarded two match points, while a loss was awarded one match point. In the case of a tie in match points, the following tiebreaker criteria was used: Between two teams:

- Higher rally points ratio in all matches.
- If still tied, winner of head-to-head match.

Between three teams:

- Higher rally points ratio in matches between tied teams.
- If still tied, higher rally points ratio in all matches.
- If still tied, the higher tournament seeding established at the General Technical Meeting.

== Competition schedule ==
The schedule was as follows.

P	Preliminary round	LL	Lucky losers playoffs	1/8	Round of 16	¼	Quarterfinals	½	Semifinals	B	Bronze medal match	F	Final

Sat 27	Sun 28	Mon 29	Tue 30	Wed 31	Thu 1	Fri 2	Sat 3		Sun 4	Mon 5	Tue 6	Wed 7	Thu 8	Fri 9	
P	P	P	P	P	P	P	P	LL	1/8	1/8	¼	¼	½	B	F

== Teams ==
24 teams qualified. The first 18 teams were announced on 11 June 2024. Each NOC is limited to two teams. The final places were revealed on 24 June 2024.

Team	NOC
Taliqua Clancy – Mariafe Artacho del Solar	Australia
Carolina Solberg Salgado – Bárbara Seixas	Brazil
Eduarda Santos Lisboa – Ana Patrícia Ramos	Brazil
Melissa Humana-Paredes – Brandie Wilkerson	Canada
Heather Bansley – Sophie Bukovec	Canada
Xia Xinyi – Xue Chen	China
Barbora Hermannová – Marie-Sára Štochlová	Czech Republic
Marwa Abdelhady – Doaa Elghobashy	Egypt
Lézana Placette – Alexia Richard	France
Aline Chamereau – Clémence Vieira	France
Laura Ludwig – Louisa Lippmann	Germany
Svenja Müller – Cinja Tillmann	Germany
Valentina Gottardi – Marta Menegatti	Italy
Akiko Hasegawa – Miki Ishii	Japan
Tīna Graudiņa – Anastasija Kravčenoka	Latvia
Monika Paulikienė – Ainė Raupelytė	Lithuania
Katja Stam – Raïsa Schoon	Netherlands
Giuliana Poletti – Michelle Valiente	Paraguay
Esmée Böbner – Zoé Vergé-Dépré	Switzerland
Tanja Hüberli – Nina Betschart	Switzerland
Daniela Álvarez Mendoza – Tania Moreno	Spain
Liliana Fernández – Paula Soria	Spain
Sara Hughes – Kelly Cheng	United States
Kristen Nuss – Kloth	United States

== Draw ==
The draw was held on 28 June.

Pool A	Pool B	Pool C
Ana Patrícia – Duda (BRA)	Nuss – Kloth (USA)	Hughes – Cheng (USA)
Gottardi – Menegatti (ITA)	Xue – X. Y. Xia (CHN)	Müller – Tillmann (GER)
Liliana – Paula (ESP)	Mariafe – Clancy (AUS)	Vieira – Chamereau (FRA)
Marwa – D. Elghobashy (EGY)	Bansley – Bukovec (CAN)	Hermannová – Štochlová (CZE)

Pool D	Pool E	Pool F
Melissa – Brandie (CAN)	Carol – Bárbara (BRA)	Placette – Richard (FRA)
Tīna – Anastasija (LAT)	Stam – Schoon (NED)	Hüberli – Brunner (SUI)
Esmée – Zoé (SUI)	Paulikienė – Raupelytė (LTU)	Álvarez M – Moreno (ESP)
Poletti – Michelle (PAR)	Akiko – Ishii (JPN)	Ludwig – Lippmann (GER)

== Referees ==
The following referees were selected for the tournament.

- (Argentina) Osvaldo Sumavil
- (Brazil) Giseli Amantino
- (Canada) Brian Hiebert
- (China) Wang Lijun
- (Colombia) Juan Carlos Saavedra
- (France) Sylvain Druart
- (Greece) Charalampos Papadogoulas
- (Italy) Davide Crescentini
- (Japan) Mariko Satomi
- (Poland) Agnieszka Myszkowska
- (Portugal) Rui Carvalho
- (Rwanda) Jean Mukundiyukuri
- (Serbia) Robert Leko
- (South Africa) Giovanni Bake
- (Spain) José María Padrón
- (United States) Brigham Beatie

== Preliminary round ==
The schedule was announced on 4 July 2024.

All times are local (UTC+2).

=== Pool A ===
Pos	Team	Pld	W	L	Pts	SW	SL	SR	SPW	SPL	SPR	Qualification
1	Ana Patricia – Duda (BRA)	3	3	0	6	6	0	MAX	126	85	1.482	Round of 16
2	Liliana – Paula (ESP)	3	2	1	5	4	3	1.333	116	131	0.885	Round of 16
3	Gottardi – Menegatti (ITA)	3	1	2	4	3	4	0.750	126	117	1.077	Round of 16
4	Abdelhady – Elghobashy (EGY)	3	0	3	3	0	6	0.000	91	126	0.722	

Source: FIVB

28 July 2024; 09:00	Gottardi – Menegatti (Italy)	1–2	(Spain) Liliana – Paula	Eiffel Tower Stadium Champ de Mars, Paris; Attendance: 8,550; Referees: Giovanni Bake (RSA), Rui Carvalho (POR)
28 July 2024; 09:00	(22–24, 21–9, 14–16); Report			Eiffel Tower Stadium Champ de Mars, Paris; Attendance: 8,550; Referees: Giovanni Bake (RSA), Rui Carvalho (POR)

28 July 2024; 16:00	Ana Patricia – Duda (Brazil)	2–0	(Egypt) Abdelhady – Elghobashy	Eiffel Tower Stadium Champ de Mars, Paris; Attendance: 10,767; Referees: Mariko Satomi (JPN), Davide Crescentini (ITA)
28 July 2024; 16:00	(21–14, 21–19); Report			Eiffel Tower Stadium Champ de Mars, Paris; Attendance: 10,767; Referees: Mariko Satomi (JPN), Davide Crescentini (ITA)

30 July 2024; 11:00	Gottardi – Menegatti (Italy)	2–0	(Egypt) Abdelhady – Elghobashy	Eiffel Tower Stadium Champ de Mars, Paris; Attendance: 10,566; Referees: Giovanni Bake (RSA), Agnieszka Myszkowska (POL)
30 July 2024; 11:00	(21–16, 21–10); Report			Eiffel Tower Stadium Champ de Mars, Paris; Attendance: 10,566; Referees: Giovanni Bake (RSA), Agnieszka Myszkowska (POL)

30 July 2024; 21:00	Ana Patricia – Duda (Brazil)	2–0	(Spain) Liliana – Paula	Eiffel Tower Stadium Champ de Mars, Paris; Attendance: 10,760; Referees: Juan Saavedra (COL), Sylvain Druart (FRA)
30 July 2024; 21:00	(21–12, 21–13); Report			Eiffel Tower Stadium Champ de Mars, Paris; Attendance: 10,760; Referees: Juan Saavedra (COL), Sylvain Druart (FRA)

1 August 2024; 11:00	Liliana – Paula (Spain)	2–0	(Egypt) Abdelhady – Elghobashy	Eiffel Tower Stadium Champ de Mars, Paris; Attendance: 10,455; Referees: Sylvain Druart (FRA), Agnieszka Myszkowska (POL)
1 August 2024; 11:00	(21–18, 21–14); Report			Eiffel Tower Stadium Champ de Mars, Paris; Attendance: 10,455; Referees: Sylvain Druart (FRA), Agnieszka Myszkowska (POL)

1 August 2024; 20:00	Ana Patricia – Duda (Brazil)	2–0	(Italy) Gottardi – Menegatti	Eiffel Tower Stadium Champ de Mars, Paris; Attendance: 10,099; Referees: Brian Hiebert (CAN), Osvaldo Sumavil (ARG)
1 August 2024; 20:00	(21–17, 21–10); Report			Eiffel Tower Stadium Champ de Mars, Paris; Attendance: 10,099; Referees: Brian Hiebert (CAN), Osvaldo Sumavil (ARG)

=== Pool B ===
Pos	Team	Pld	W	L	Pts	SW	SL	SR	SPW	SPL	SPR	Qualification
1	Nuss – Kloth (USA)	3	3	0	6	6	1	6.000	135	112	1.205	Round of 16
2	Mariafe – Clancy (AUS)	3	2	1	5	4	3	1.333	126	123	1.024	Round of 16
3	Xue – Xia (CHN)	3	1	2	4	4	4	1.000	146	137	1.066	Round of 16
4	Bansley – Bukovec (CAN)	3	0	3	3	0	6	0.000	91	126	0.722	

Source: FIVB

27 July 2024; 18:00	Xue – Xia (China)	1–2	(Australia) Mariafe – Clancy	Eiffel Tower Stadium Champ de Mars, Paris; Attendance: 10,250; Referees: Osvaldo Sumavil (ARG), Agnieszka Myszkowska (POL)
27 July 2024; 18:00	(20–22, 21–14, 14–16); Report			Eiffel Tower Stadium Champ de Mars, Paris; Attendance: 10,250; Referees: Osvaldo Sumavil (ARG), Agnieszka Myszkowska (POL)

27 July 2024; 22:00	Nuss – Kloth (United States)	2–0	(Canada) Bansley – Bukovec	Eiffel Tower Stadium Champ de Mars, Paris; Attendance: 10,314; Referees: Giseli Amantino (BRA), Mariko Satomi (JPN)
27 July 2024; 22:00	(21–17, 21–14); Report			Eiffel Tower Stadium Champ de Mars, Paris; Attendance: 10,314; Referees: Giseli Amantino (BRA), Mariko Satomi (JPN)

29 July 2024; 11:00	Xue – Xia (China)	2–0	(Canada) Bansley – Bukovec	Eiffel Tower Stadium Champ de Mars, Paris; Attendance: 10,580; Referees: Agnieszka Myszkowska (POL), Giovanni Bake (RSA)
29 July 2024; 11:00	(21–15, 21–19); Report			Eiffel Tower Stadium Champ de Mars, Paris; Attendance: 10,580; Referees: Agnieszka Myszkowska (POL), Giovanni Bake (RSA)

29 July 2024; 22:00	Nuss – Kloth (United States)	2–0	(Australia) Mariafe – Clancy	Eiffel Tower Stadium Champ de Mars, Paris; Attendance: 10,237; Referees: Wang Lijun (CHN), Osvaldo Sumavil (ARG)
29 July 2024; 22:00	(21–16, 21–16); Report			Eiffel Tower Stadium Champ de Mars, Paris; Attendance: 10,237; Referees: Wang Lijun (CHN), Osvaldo Sumavil (ARG)

1 August 2024; 16:00	Mariafe – Clancy (Australia)	2–0	(Canada) Bansley – Bukovec	Eiffel Tower Stadium Champ de Mars, Paris; Attendance: 10,107; Referees: Jean Mukundiyukuri (RWA), Wang Lijun (CHN)
1 August 2024; 16:00	(21–10, 21–16); Report			Eiffel Tower Stadium Champ de Mars, Paris; Attendance: 10,107; Referees: Jean Mukundiyukuri (RWA), Wang Lijun (CHN)

1 August 2024; 22:00	Nuss – Kloth (United States)	2–1	(China) Xue – Xia	Eiffel Tower Stadium Champ de Mars, Paris; Attendance: 10,805; Referees: José Padron (ESP), Giseli Amantino (BRA)
1 August 2024; 22:00	(15–21, 21–16, 15–12); Report			Eiffel Tower Stadium Champ de Mars, Paris; Attendance: 10,805; Referees: José Padron (ESP), Giseli Amantino (BRA)

=== Pool C ===
Pos	Team	Pld	W	L	Pts	SW	SL	SR	SPW	SPL	SPR	Qualification
1	Hughes – Cheng (USA)	3	3	0	6	6	0	MAX	128	100	1.280	Round of 16
2	Müller – Tillmann (GER)	3	2	1	5	4	2	2.000	120	94	1.277	Round of 16
3	Hermannová – Štochlová (CZE)	3	1	2	4	2	5	0.400	107	127	0.843	Lucky losers
4	Vieira – Chamereau (FRA)	3	0	3	3	1	6	0.167	106	140	0.757	

Source: FIVB

28 July 2024; 12:00	Müller – Tillmann (Germany)	2–0	(France) Vieira – Chamereau	Eiffel Tower Stadium Champ de Mars, Paris; Attendance: 10,693; Referees: Charalampos Papadogoulas (GRE), Juan Saavedra (COL)
28 July 2024; 12:00	(21–14, 21–12); Report			Eiffel Tower Stadium Champ de Mars, Paris; Attendance: 10,693; Referees: Charalampos Papadogoulas (GRE), Juan Saavedra (COL)

28 July 2024; 22:00	Hughes – Cheng (United States)	2–0	(Czech Republic) Hermannová – Štochlová	Eiffel Tower Stadium Champ de Mars, Paris; Attendance: 10,598; Referees: Osvaldo Sumavil (ARG), Davide Crescentini (ITA)
28 July 2024; 22:00	(21–16, 21–11); Report			Eiffel Tower Stadium Champ de Mars, Paris; Attendance: 10,598; Referees: Osvaldo Sumavil (ARG), Davide Crescentini (ITA)

31 July 2024; 11:00	Müller – Tillmann (Germany)	2–0	(Czech Republic) Hermannová – Štochlová	Eiffel Tower Stadium Champ de Mars, Paris; Attendance: 10,643; Referees: Robert Leko (SRB), Jean Mukundiyukuri (RWA)
31 July 2024; 11:00	(21–17, 21–9); Report			Eiffel Tower Stadium Champ de Mars, Paris; Attendance: 10,643; Referees: Robert Leko (SRB), Jean Mukundiyukuri (RWA)

31 July 2024; 15:00	Hughes – Cheng (United States)	2–0	(France) Vieira – Chamereau	Eiffel Tower Stadium Champ de Mars, Paris; Attendance: 9,777; Referees: José Padron (ESP), Agnieszka Myszkowska (POL)
31 July 2024; 15:00	(21–16, 23–21); Report			Eiffel Tower Stadium Champ de Mars, Paris; Attendance: 9,777; Referees: José Padron (ESP), Agnieszka Myszkowska (POL)

2 August 2024; 12:00	Vieira – Chamereau (France)	1–2	(Czech Republic) Hermannová – Štochlová	Eiffel Tower Stadium Champ de Mars, Paris; Attendance: 11,233; Referees: Robert Leko (SRB), Rui Carvalho (POR)
2 August 2024; 12:00	(13–21, 21–18, 9–15); Report			Eiffel Tower Stadium Champ de Mars, Paris; Attendance: 11,233; Referees: Robert Leko (SRB), Rui Carvalho (POR)

2 August 2024; 22:00	Hughes – Cheng (United States)	2–0	(Germany) Müller – Tillmann	Eiffel Tower Stadium Champ de Mars, Paris; Attendance: 10,891; Referees: Agnieszka Myszkowska (POL), Giseli Amantino (BRA)
2 August 2024; 22:00	(21–18, 21–18); Report			Eiffel Tower Stadium Champ de Mars, Paris; Attendance: 10,891; Referees: Agnieszka Myszkowska (POL), Giseli Amantino (BRA)

=== Pool D ===
Pos	Team	Pld	W	L	Pts	SW	SL	SR	SPW	SPL	SPR	Qualification
1	Esmée – Zoé (SUI)	3	3	0	6	6	2	3.000	147	133	1.105	Round of 16
2	Tīna – Anastasija (LAT)	3	2	1	5	4	2	2.000	114	110	1.036	Round of 16
3	Melissa – Brandie (CAN)	3	1	2	4	3	4	0.750	126	120	1.050	Lucky losers
4	Poletti – Michelle (PAR)	3	0	3	3	1	6	0.167	116	140	0.829	

Source: FIVB

29 July 2024; 15:00	Melissa – Brandie (Canada)	2–0	(Paraguay) Poletti – Michelle	Eiffel Tower Stadium Champ de Mars, Paris; Attendance: 9,689; Referees: Jean Mukundiyukuri (RWA), Charalampos Papadogoulas (GRE)
29 July 2024; 15:00	(21–16, 21–12); Report			Eiffel Tower Stadium Champ de Mars, Paris; Attendance: 9,689; Referees: Jean Mukundiyukuri (RWA), Charalampos Papadogoulas (GRE)

29 July 2024; 17:00	Tīna – Anastasija (Latvia)	0–2	(Switzerland) Esmée – Zoé	Eiffel Tower Stadium Champ de Mars, Paris; Attendance: 10,834; Referees: Sylvain Druart (FRA), Mariko Satomi (JPN)
29 July 2024; 17:00	(15–21, 14–21); Report			Eiffel Tower Stadium Champ de Mars, Paris; Attendance: 10,834; Referees: Sylvain Druart (FRA), Mariko Satomi (JPN)

31 July 2024; 12:00	Tīna – Anastasija (Latvia)	2–0	(Paraguay) Poletti – Michelle	Eiffel Tower Stadium Champ de Mars, Paris; Attendance: 10,738; Referees: Mariko Satomi (JPN), Giovanni Bake (RSA)
31 July 2024; 12:00	(21–19, 21–15); Report			Eiffel Tower Stadium Champ de Mars, Paris; Attendance: 10,738; Referees: Mariko Satomi (JPN), Giovanni Bake (RSA)

31 July 2024; 21:30	Melissa – Brandie (Canada)	1–2	(Switzerland) Esmée – Zoé	Eiffel Tower Stadium Champ de Mars, Paris; Attendance: 10,105; Referees: Giseli Amantino (BRA), Brigham Beaties (USA)
31 July 2024; 21:30	(18–21, 21–13, 11–15); Report			Eiffel Tower Stadium Champ de Mars, Paris; Attendance: 10,105; Referees: Giseli Amantino (BRA), Brigham Beaties (USA)

3 August 2024; 11:00	Esmée – Zoé (Switzerland)	2–1	(Paraguay) Poletti – Michelle	Eiffel Tower Stadium Champ de Mars, Paris; Attendance: 10,721; Referees: Sylvain Druart (FRA), Mariko Satomi (JPN)
3 August 2024; 11:00	(23–21, 18–21, 15–12); Report			Eiffel Tower Stadium Champ de Mars, Paris; Attendance: 10,721; Referees: Sylvain Druart (FRA), Mariko Satomi (JPN)

3 August 2024; 17:00	Melissa – Brandie (Canada)	0–2	(Latvia) Tīna – Anastasija	Eiffel Tower Stadium Champ de Mars, Paris; Attendance: 10,659; Referees: Jean Mukundiyukuri (RWA), Juan Saavedra (COL)
3 August 2024; 17:00	(14–21, 20–22); Report			Eiffel Tower Stadium Champ de Mars, Paris; Attendance: 10,659; Referees: Jean Mukundiyukuri (RWA), Juan Saavedra (COL)

=== Pool E ===
Pos	Team	Pld	W	L	Pts	SW	SL	SR	SPW	SPL	SPR	Qualification
1	Carol – Bárbara (BRA)	3	3	0	6	6	1	6.000	140	113	1.239	Round of 16
2	Stam – Schoon (NED)	3	2	1	5	5	2	2.500	139	122	1.139	Round of 16
3	Akiko – Ishii (JPN)	3	1	2	4	2	4	0.500	103	100	1.030	Lucky losers
4	Paulikienė – Raupelytė (LTU)	3	0	3	3	0	6	0.000	79	126	0.627	

Source: FIVB

28 July 2024; 11:00	Carol – Bárbara (Brazil)	2–0	(Japan) Akiko – Ishii	Eiffel Tower Stadium Champ de Mars, Paris; Attendance: 10,656; Referees: Agnieszka Myszkowska (POL), José Padron (ESP)
28 July 2024; 11:00	(21–12, 21–19); Report			Eiffel Tower Stadium Champ de Mars, Paris; Attendance: 10,656; Referees: Agnieszka Myszkowska (POL), José Padron (ESP)

28 July 2024; 15:00	Stam – Schoon (Netherlands)	2–0	(Lithuania) Paulikienė – Raupelytė	Eiffel Tower Stadium Champ de Mars, Paris; Attendance: 10,282; Referees: Rui Carvalho (POR), Jean Mukundiyukuri (RWA)
28 July 2024; 15:00	(21–19, 21–17); Report			Eiffel Tower Stadium Champ de Mars, Paris; Attendance: 10,282; Referees: Rui Carvalho (POR), Jean Mukundiyukuri (RWA)

30 July 2024; 16:00	Carol – Bárbara (Brazil)	2–0	(Lithuania) Paulikienė – Raupelytė	Eiffel Tower Stadium Champ de Mars, Paris; Attendance: 10,795; Referees: Davide Crescentini (ITA), Wang Lijun (CHN)
30 July 2024; 16:00	(21–13, 21–14); Report			Eiffel Tower Stadium Champ de Mars, Paris; Attendance: 10,795; Referees: Davide Crescentini (ITA), Wang Lijun (CHN)

30 July 2024; 22:00	Stam – Schoon (Netherlands)	2–0	(Japan) Akiko – Ishii	Eiffel Tower Stadium Champ de Mars, Paris; Attendance: 10,828; Referees: Giseli Amantino (BRA), Wang Lijun (CHN)
30 July 2024; 22:00	(21–16, 21–14); Report			Eiffel Tower Stadium Champ de Mars, Paris; Attendance: 10,828; Referees: Giseli Amantino (BRA), Wang Lijun (CHN)

2 August 2024; 09:00	Paulikienė – Raupelytė (Lithuania)	0–2	(Japan) Akiko – Ishii	Eiffel Tower Stadium Champ de Mars, Paris; Attendance: 9,626; Referees: Giovanni Bake (RSA), Robert Leko (SRB)
2 August 2024; 09:00	(11–21, 5–21); Report			Eiffel Tower Stadium Champ de Mars, Paris; Attendance: 9,626; Referees: Giovanni Bake (RSA), Robert Leko (SRB)

2 August 2024; 17:00	Carol – Bárbara (Brazil)	2–1	(Netherlands) Stam – Schoon	Eiffel Tower Stadium Champ de Mars, Paris; Attendance: 10,680; Referees: Wang Lijun (CHN), José Padron (ESP)
2 August 2024; 17:00	(16–21, 21–17, 19–17); Report			Eiffel Tower Stadium Champ de Mars, Paris; Attendance: 10,680; Referees: Wang Lijun (CHN), José Padron (ESP)

=== Pool F ===
Pos	Team	Pld	W	L	Pts	SW	SL	SR	SPW	SPL	SPR	Qualification
1	Hüberli – Betschart (SUI)	3	3	0	6	6	0	MAX	126	74	1.703	Round of 16
2	Álvarez – Moreno (ESP)	3	2	1	5	4	2	2.000	115	104	1.106	Round of 16
3	Placette – Richard (FRA)	3	1	2	4	2	4	0.500	89	118	0.754	Lucky losers
4	Ludwig – Lippmann (GER)	3	0	3	3	0	6	0.000	93	127	0.732	

Source: FIVB

29 July 2024; 12:00	Hüberli – Betschart (Switzerland)	2–0	(Spain) Álvarez – Moreno	Eiffel Tower Stadium Champ de Mars, Paris; Attendance: 10,580; Referees: Robert Leko (SRB), Rui Carvalho (POR)
29 July 2024; 12:00	(21–12, 21–19); Report			Eiffel Tower Stadium Champ de Mars, Paris; Attendance: 10,580; Referees: Robert Leko (SRB), Rui Carvalho (POR)

29 July 2024; 21:00	Placette – Richard (France)	2–0	(Germany) Ludwig – Lippmann	Eiffel Tower Stadium Champ de Mars, Paris; Attendance: 10,731; Referees: Giseli Amantino (BRA), Brigham Beatie (USA)
29 July 2024; 21:00	(21–14, 22–20); Report			Eiffel Tower Stadium Champ de Mars, Paris; Attendance: 10,731; Referees: Giseli Amantino (BRA), Brigham Beatie (USA)

31 July 2024; 10:00	Hüberli – Betschart (Switzerland)	2–0	(Germany) Ludwig – Lippmann	Eiffel Tower Stadium Champ de Mars, Paris; Attendance: 10,501; Referees: Agnieszka Myszkowska (POL), Rui Carvalho (POR)
31 July 2024; 10:00	(21–9, 21–15); Report			Eiffel Tower Stadium Champ de Mars, Paris; Attendance: 10,501; Referees: Agnieszka Myszkowska (POL), Rui Carvalho (POR)

31 July 2024; 17:00	Placette – Richard (France)	0–2	(Spain) Álvarez – Moreno	Eiffel Tower Stadium Champ de Mars, Paris; Attendance: 10,677; Referees: Davide Crescentini (ITA), Brian Hiebert (CAN)
31 July 2024; 17:00	(12–21, 15–21); Report			Eiffel Tower Stadium Champ de Mars, Paris; Attendance: 10,677; Referees: Davide Crescentini (ITA), Brian Hiebert (CAN)

3 August 2024; 12:00	Álvarez – Moreno (Spain)	2–0	(Germany) Ludwig – Lippmann	Eiffel Tower Stadium Champ de Mars, Paris; Attendance: 10,832; Referees: Brian Hiebert (CAN), Giovanni Bake (RSA)
3 August 2024; 12:00	(21–16, 21–19); Report			Eiffel Tower Stadium Champ de Mars, Paris; Attendance: 10,832; Referees: Brian Hiebert (CAN), Giovanni Bake (RSA)

3 August 2024; 16:00	Placette – Richard (France)	0–2	(Switzerland) Hüberli – Betschart	Eiffel Tower Stadium Champ de Mars, Paris; Attendance: 10,181; Referees: Robert Leko (SRB), Davide Crescentini (ITA)
3 August 2024; 16:00	(11–21, 8–21); Report			Eiffel Tower Stadium Champ de Mars, Paris; Attendance: 10,181; Referees: Robert Leko (SRB), Davide Crescentini (ITA)

=== Lucky losers ===
The table below shows the ranking of third-placed teams in the preliminary round. The top two teams will advance to the next round automatically. The other teams will compete for the two remaining spots. The third-ranked team will play the sixth-ranked team, and the fourth-ranked team will play the fifth-ranked team.

Pos	Grp	Team	Pld	W	L	Pts	SW	SL	SR	SPW	SPL	SPR	Qualification
1	B	Xue – Xia (CHN)	3	1	2	4	4	4	1.000	146	137	1.066	Round of 16
2	A	Gottardi – Menegatti (ITA)	3	1	2	4	3	4	0.750	126	117	1.077	Round of 16
3	D	Melissa – Brandie (CAN)	3	1	2	4	3	4	0.750	126	120	1.050	Lucky loser playoffs
4	E	Akiko – Ishii (JPN)	3	1	2	4	2	4	0.500	103	100	1.030	Lucky loser playoffs
5	F	Placette – Richard (FRA)	3	1	2	4	2	4	0.500	89	118	0.754	Lucky loser playoffs
6	C	Hermannová – Štochlová (CZE)	3	1	2	4	2	5	0.400	107	127	0.843	Lucky loser playoffs

Source: FIVB

==== Lucky loser playoffs ====
3 August 2024; 21:00	Akiko – Ishii (Japan)	2–0	(France) Placette – Richard	Eiffel Tower Stadium Champ de Mars, Paris; Attendance: 10,244; Referees: Brigham Beatie (USA), Wang Lijun (CHN)
3 August 2024; 21:00	(21–15, 21–18); Report			Eiffel Tower Stadium Champ de Mars, Paris; Attendance: 10,244; Referees: Brigham Beatie (USA), Wang Lijun (CHN)

3 August 2024; 22:00	Melissa – Brandie (Canada)	2–0	(Czech Republic) Hermannová – Štochlová	Eiffel Tower Stadium Champ de Mars, Paris; Attendance: 10,762; Referees: Giseli Amantino (BRA), Agnieszka Myszkowska (POL)
3 August 2024; 22:00	(21–15, 21–12); Report			Eiffel Tower Stadium Champ de Mars, Paris; Attendance: 10,762; Referees: Giseli Amantino (BRA), Agnieszka Myszkowska (POL)

== Knockout stage ==
The round of sixteen pair up will be determined by drawing of lots. The six first ranked teams in preliminary pools are separated automatically. Then, the lucky loser playoffs winners will be drawn. The two best third ranked will be drawn next. And, the last drawing belongs to the second ranked teams. The teams in the same pool from preliminary round can not meet in round of 16.

=== Bracket ===
Round of 16
5 August
Ana Patricia – Duda (BRA)	2
Akiko – Ishii (JPN)	0
5 August
Müller – Tillmann (GER)	1
Tīna – Anastasija (LAT)	2
4 August
Carol – Bárbara (BRA)	0
Mariafe – Clancy (AUS)	2
4 August
Xue – X. Y. Xia (CHN)	0
Esmée – Zoé (SUI)	2
4 August
Hughes – Cheng (USA)	2
Gottardi – Menegatti (ITA)	1
4 August
Liliana – Paula (ESP)	0
Hüberli – Betschart (SUI)	2
5 August
Álvarez M – Moreno (ESP)	2
Stam – Schoon (NED)	1
5 August
Melissa – Brandie (CAN)	2
Nuss – Kloth (USA)	0

Quarter-finals
7 August
Ana Patricia – Duda (BRA)	2
Tīna – Anastasija (LAT)	0
6 August
Mariafe – Clancy (AUS)	2
Esmée – Zoé (SUI)	1
6 August
Hughes – Cheng (USA)	0
Hüberli – Betschart (SUI)	2
7 August
Álvarez M – Moreno (ESP)	0
Melissa – Brandie (CAN)	2

Semi-finals
8 August
Ana Patricia – Duda (BRA)	2
Mariafe – Clancy (AUS)	1
8 August
Hüberli – Betschart (SUI)	1
Melissa – Brandie (CAN)	2

Gold medal
9 August
Ana Patricia – Duda (BRA)	2
Melissa – Brandie (CAN)	1
Bronze medal
9 August
Mariafe – Clancy (AUS)	0
Hüberli – Betschart (SUI)	2

=== Round of 16 ===
4 August 2024; 09:00	Xue – X. Y. Xia (China)	0–2	(Switzerland) Esmée – Zoé	Eiffel Tower Stadium Champ de Mars, Paris; Attendance: 10,304; Referees: Robert Leko (SRB), Mariko Satomi (JPN)
4 August 2024; 09:00	(27–29, 16–21); Report			Eiffel Tower Stadium Champ de Mars, Paris; Attendance: 10,304; Referees: Robert Leko (SRB), Mariko Satomi (JPN)

4 August 2024; 17:00	Carol – Bárbara (Brazil)	0–2	(Australia) Mariafe – Clancy	Eiffel Tower Stadium Champ de Mars, Paris; Attendance: 10,623; Referees: Brigham Beatie (USA), Juan Saavedra (COL)
4 August 2024; 17:00	(22–24, 14–21); Report			Eiffel Tower Stadium Champ de Mars, Paris; Attendance: 10,623; Referees: Brigham Beatie (USA), Juan Saavedra (COL)

4 August 2024; 18:00	Liliana – Paula (Spain)	0–2	(Switzerland) Hüberli – Betschart	Eiffel Tower Stadium Champ de Mars, Paris; Attendance: 10,796; Referees: Agnieszka Myszkowska (POL), Giseli Amantino (BRA)
4 August 2024; 18:00	(21–23, 16–21); Report			Eiffel Tower Stadium Champ de Mars, Paris; Attendance: 10,796; Referees: Agnieszka Myszkowska (POL), Giseli Amantino (BRA)

4 August 2024; 22:00	Hughes – Cheng (United States)	2–1	(Italy) Gottardi – Menegatti	Eiffel Tower Stadium Champ de Mars, Paris; Attendance: 10,846; Referees: Wang Lijun (CHN), Jean Mukundyukuri (RWA)
4 August 2024; 22:00	(21–18, 17–21, 15–12); Report			Eiffel Tower Stadium Champ de Mars, Paris; Attendance: 10,846; Referees: Wang Lijun (CHN), Jean Mukundyukuri (RWA)

5 August 2024; 09:00	Müller – Tillmann (Germany)	1–2	(Latvia) Tīna – Anastasija	Eiffel Tower Stadium Champ de Mars, Paris; Attendance: 9,988; Referees: Rui Carvalho (POR), Mariko Satomi (JPN)
5 August 2024; 09:00	(13–21, 21–17, 16–18); Report			Eiffel Tower Stadium Champ de Mars, Paris; Attendance: 9,988; Referees: Rui Carvalho (POR), Mariko Satomi (JPN)

5 August 2024; 13:00	Álvarez M – Moreno (Spain)	2–1	(Netherlands) Stam – Schoon	Eiffel Tower Stadium Champ de Mars, Paris; Attendance: 10,647; Referees: Charalampos Papadogoulas (GRE), Sylvain Druart (FRA)
5 August 2024; 13:00	(18–21, 21–19, 15–13); Report			Eiffel Tower Stadium Champ de Mars, Paris; Attendance: 10,647; Referees: Charalampos Papadogoulas (GRE), Sylvain Druart (FRA)

5 August 2024; 18:00	Melissa – Brandie (Canada)	2–0	(United States) Nuss – Kloth	Eiffel Tower Stadium Champ de Mars, Paris; Attendance: 10,105; Referees: Juan Saavedra (COL), Agnieszka Myszkowska (POL)
5 August 2024; 18:00	(21–19, 21–18); Report			Eiffel Tower Stadium Champ de Mars, Paris; Attendance: 10,105; Referees: Juan Saavedra (COL), Agnieszka Myszkowska (POL)

5 August 2024; 21:00	Ana Patricia – Duda (Brazil)	2–0	(Japan) Akiko – Ishii	Eiffel Tower Stadium Champ de Mars, Paris; Attendance: 10,390; Referees: Jean Mukundiyukuri (RWA), Wang Lijun (CHN)
5 August 2024; 21:00	(21–15, 21–16); Report			Eiffel Tower Stadium Champ de Mars, Paris; Attendance: 10,390; Referees: Jean Mukundiyukuri (RWA), Wang Lijun (CHN)

=== Quarterfinals ===
6 August 2024; 21:00	Mariafe – Clancy (Australia)	2–1	(Switzerland) Esmée – Zoé	Eiffel Tower Stadium Champ de Mars, Paris; Attendance: 10,216; Referees: Brigham Beatie (USA), Jean Mukundiyukuri (RWA)
6 August 2024; 21:00	(21–19, 16–21, 15–12); Report			Eiffel Tower Stadium Champ de Mars, Paris; Attendance: 10,216; Referees: Brigham Beatie (USA), Jean Mukundiyukuri (RWA)

6 August 2024; 22:00	Hughes – Cheng (United States)	0–2	(Switzerland) Hüberli – Betschart	Eiffel Tower Stadium Champ de Mars, Paris; Attendance: 10,524; Referees: Osvaldo Sumavil (ARG), Juan Saavedra (COL)
6 August 2024; 22:00	(18–21 19–21); Report			Eiffel Tower Stadium Champ de Mars, Paris; Attendance: 10,524; Referees: Osvaldo Sumavil (ARG), Juan Saavedra (COL)

7 August 2024; 17:00	Álvarez M – Moreno (Spain)	0–2	(Canada) Melissa – Brandie	Eiffel Tower Stadium Champ de Mars, Paris; Attendance: 10,365; Referees: Agnieszka Myszkowska (POL), Sylvain Druart (FRA)
7 August 2024; 17:00	(18–21, 18–21); Report			Eiffel Tower Stadium Champ de Mars, Paris; Attendance: 10,365; Referees: Agnieszka Myszkowska (POL), Sylvain Druart (FRA)

7 August 2024; 18:00	Ana Patricia – Duda (Brazil)	2–0	(Latvia) Tīna – Anastasija	Eiffel Tower Stadium Champ de Mars, Paris; Attendance: 10,775; Referees: José Padron (ESP), Robert Leko (SRB)
7 August 2024; 18:00	(21–16, 21–10); Report			Eiffel Tower Stadium Champ de Mars, Paris; Attendance: 10,775; Referees: José Padron (ESP), Robert Leko (SRB)

=== Semifinals ===
8 August 2024; 17:00	Hüberli – Betschart (Switzerland)	1–2	(Canada) Melissa – Brandie	Eiffel Tower Stadium Champ de Mars, Paris; Attendance: 10,132; Referees: Wang Lijun (CHN), Jean Mukundiyukuri (RWA)
8 August 2024; 17:00	(21–14, 20–22, 12–15); Report			Eiffel Tower Stadium Champ de Mars, Paris; Attendance: 10,132; Referees: Wang Lijun (CHN), Jean Mukundiyukuri (RWA)

8 August 2024; 21:00	Ana Patricia – Duda (Brazil)	2–1	(Australia) Mariafe – Clancy	Eiffel Tower Stadium Champ de Mars, Paris; Attendance: 10,373; Referees: Davide Crescentini (ITA), Agnieszka Myszkowska (POL)
8 August 2024; 21:00	(20–22, 21–15, 15–12); Report			Eiffel Tower Stadium Champ de Mars, Paris; Attendance: 10,373; Referees: Davide Crescentini (ITA), Agnieszka Myszkowska (POL)

=== Bronze medal game ===
9 August 2024; 21:00	Mariafe – Clancy (Australia)	0–2	(Switzerland) Hüberli – Betschart	Eiffel Tower Stadium Champ de Mars, Paris; Attendance: 9,241; Referees: Osvaldo Sumavil (ARG), Giseli Amantino (BRA)
9 August 2024; 21:00	(17–21, 15–21); Report			Eiffel Tower Stadium Champ de Mars, Paris; Attendance: 9,241; Referees: Osvaldo Sumavil (ARG), Giseli Amantino (BRA)

=== Gold medal game ===
9 August 2024; 22:30	Ana Patrícia – Duda (Brazil)	2–1	(Canada) Melissa – Brandie	Eiffel Tower Stadium Champ de Mars, Paris; Attendance: 10,412; Referees: Agnieszka Myszkowska (POL), Robert Leko (SRB)
9 August 2024; 22:30	(26–24, 12–21, 15–10); Report			Eiffel Tower Stadium Champ de Mars, Paris; Attendance: 10,412; Referees: Agnieszka Myszkowska (POL), Robert Leko (SRB)

== Final ranking ==
Rank	Team
Gold medal	Ana Patrícia – Duda Lisboa (BRA)
Silver medal	Melissa – Brandie (CAN)
Bronze medal	Hüberli – Betschart (SUI)
4	Mariafe – Clancy (AUS)
5	Tīna – Anastasija (LAT)
5	Esmée – Zoé (SUI)
5	Álvarez M – Moreno (ESP)
5	Hughes – Cheng (USA)
9	Carol – Bárbara (BRA)
9	Xue – X. Y. Xia (CHN)
9	Müller – Tillmann (GER)
9	Gottardi – Menegatti (ITA)
9	Akiko – Ishii (JPN)
9	Stam – Schoon (NED)
9	Liliana – Paula (ESP)
9	Nuss – Kloth (USA)
17	Hermannová – Štochlová (CZE)
17	Placette – Richard (FRA)
19	Bansley – Bukovec (CAN)
19	Abdelhady – Elghobashy (EGY)
19	Vieira – Chamereau (FRA)
19	Ludwig – Lippmann (GER)
19	Paulikienė – Raupelytė (LTU)
19	Poletti – Michelle (PAR)

== See also ==
- Beach volleyball at the 2024 Summer Olympics
- Beach volleyball at the 2024 Summer Olympics – Men's tournament
- Volleyball at the 2024 Summer Olympics – Women's tournament
- Sitting volleyball at the 2024 Summer Paralympics – Women's tournament
