= Volleyball at the 2024 Summer Olympics =

Volleyball at the Games of the XXXIII Olympiad
- Pictograms for indoor (top) and beach volleyball (bottom)
- Venue: Paris Expo Porte de Versailles (indoor); Eiffel Tower Stadium (beach)
- Dates: 27 July – 11 August 2024
- No. of events: 4 (2 men, 2 women)
- Competitors: 384 from 31 nations

The volleyball tournaments at the 2024 Summer Olympics in Paris were held from 27 July to 11 August 2024. 24 volleyball teams and 48 beach volleyball teams participated in the tournament. Indoor volleyball competitions occurred at Paris Expo Porte de Versailles with the beach volleyball tournament staged at the Eiffel Tower Stadium in Champ de Mars.

This was the first time in the history of the Olympic volleyball competition, each team participating in the Games was entitled to include one non-competing (AP) athlete to replace an athlete for medical reasons. As such, team rosters increased from 12 to 13 athletes. However, only 12 were considered as part of the team.

== Medal summary ==
=== Medal table ===
* Host nation (France)

Rank	NOC	Gold	Silver	Bronze	Total
1	Brazil	1	0	1	2
2	France*	1	0	0	1
2	Italy	1	0	0	1
2	Sweden	1	0	0	1
5	United States	0	1	1	2
6	Canada	0	1	0	1
6	Germany	0	1	0	1
6	Poland	0	1	0	1
9	Norway	0	0	1	1
9	Switzerland	0	0	1	1
Totals (10 entries)		4	4	4	12

=== Medalists ===
==== Beach volleyball ====
Event	Gold	Silver	Bronze
Men's beach	Sweden; David Åhman; Jonatan Hellvig	Germany; Nils Ehlers; Clemens Wickler	Norway; Anders Mol; Christian Sørum
Women's beach	Brazil; Ana Patrícia Ramos; Duda Lisboa	Canada; Melissa Humana-Paredes; Brandie Wilkerson	Switzerland; Tanja Hüberli; Nina Betschart

==== Indoor volleyball ====
Event	Gold	Silver	Bronze
Men's tournament	France; Barthélémy Chinenyeze; Jenia Grebennikov; Jean Patry; Benjamin Toniutti; Kévin Tillie; Earvin N'Gapeth; Antoine Brizard; Nicolas Le Goff; Trévor Clévenot; Yacine Louati; Théo Faure; Quentin Jouffroy	Poland; Łukasz Kaczmarek; Bartosz Kurek; Wilfredo León; Aleksander Śliwka; Grzegorz Łomacz; Jakub Kochanowski; Kamil Semeniuk; Paweł Zatorski; Marcin Janusz; Mateusz Bieniek; Tomasz Fornal; Norbert Huber; Bartłomiej Bołądź	United States; Matt Anderson; Aaron Russell; Jeffrey Jendryk; Torey DeFalco; Micah Christenson; Maxwell Holt; Micah Maʻa; Thomas Jaeschke; Garrett Muagututia; Taylor Averill; David Smith; Erik Shoji
Women's tournament	Italy; Marina Lubian; Carlotta Cambi; Monica De Gennaro; Alessia Orro; Caterina Bosetti; Anna Danesi; Myriam Sylla; Paola Egonu; Sarah Luisa Fahr; Loveth Omoruyi; Ekaterina Antropova; Gaia Giovannini; Ilaria Spirito	United States; Micha Hancock; Jordyn Poulter; Avery Skinner; Justine Wong-Orantes; Lauren Carlini; Jordan Larson; Annie Drews; Jordan Thompson; Haleigh Washington; Dana Rettke; Kathryn Plummer; Kelsey Robinson Cook; Chiaka Ogbogu	Brazil; Nyeme Costa; Diana Duarte; Macris Carneiro; Thaísa Menezes; Rosamaria Montibeller; Roberta Ratzke; Gabriela Guimarães; Ana Cristina de Souza; Natália Araújo; Ana Carolina da Silva; Júlia Bergmann; Tainara Santos; Lorenne Teixeira

== Qualification summary ==
=== Summary table ===
Nation	Men's Indoor	Women's Indoor	Men's beach	Women's beach	Athletes
Argentina	Yes	—	—	—	12
Australia	—	—	2	Yes	6
Austria	—	—	Yes	—	2
Brazil	Yes	Yes	2	2	32
Canada	Yes	—	Yes	2	18
Chile	—	—	Yes	—	2
China	—	Yes	—	Yes	14
Cuba	—	—	Yes	—	2
Czech Republic	—	—	Yes	Yes	4
Dominican Republic	—	Yes	—	—	12
Egypt	Yes	—	—	Yes	14
France	Yes	Yes	2	2	32
Germany	Yes	—	Yes	2	18
Italy	Yes	Yes	2	Yes	30
Japan	Yes	Yes	—	Yes	26
Kenya	—	Yes	—	—	12
Latvia	—	—	—	Yes	2
Lithuania	—	—	—	Yes	2
Morocco	—	—	Yes	—	2
Netherlands	—	Yes	2	Yes	18
Norway	—	—	Yes	—	2
Paraguay	—	—	—	Yes	2
Poland	Yes	Yes	Yes	—	26
Qatar	—	—	Yes	—	2
Serbia	Yes	Yes	—	—	24
Slovenia	Yes	—	—	—	12
Spain	—	—	Yes	2	6
Sweden	—	—	Yes	—	2
Switzerland	—	—	—	2	4
Turkey	—	Yes	—	—	12
United States	Yes	Yes	2	2	32
Total: 31 NOCs	144	144	48	48	384

=== Indoor volleyball ===
On 6 April 2022, Fédération Internationale de Volleyball welcomed the International Olympic Committee's decision to approve several changes to the Olympic volleyball program and its qualification system, particularly on the rules of the allocation of the quota places for Paris 2024. Twelve teams per gender will participate in the indoor volleyball tournament. As the host nation, France, the reigning men's champions, reserves a direct spot each for both the men's and women's teams.

The remainder of the twelve-team field per gender must endure a dual qualification pathway to secure the quota places for Paris 2024. First, the winners and runners-up from each of the three Olympic qualification tournaments will qualify directly for the Games. Second, the last five berths will be attributed to the eligible NOCs based on the FIVB world rankings by June 2024 while observing the universality principle, that is, prioritizing those from the continents without a qualified team yet in the Paris 2024 tournament.

==== Men's volleyball ====
Qualification		Date	Venue	Berths	Qualified team
Host nation		—		1	France
FIVB Olympic Qualification Tournaments	Pool A	30 September – 8 October 2023	(Brazil) Rio de Janeiro	2	Germany
FIVB Olympic Qualification Tournaments	Pool A	30 September – 8 October 2023	(Brazil) Rio de Janeiro	2	Brazil
FIVB Olympic Qualification Tournaments	Pool B	30 September – 8 October 2023	(Japan) Tokyo	2	United States
FIVB Olympic Qualification Tournaments	Pool B	30 September – 8 October 2023	(Japan) Tokyo	2	Japan
FIVB Olympic Qualification Tournaments	Pool C	30 September – 8 October 2023	(China) Xi'an	2	Poland
FIVB Olympic Qualification Tournaments	Pool C	30 September – 8 October 2023	(China) Xi'an	2	Canada
World Ranking qualification pathway		24 June 2024	—	5	Slovenia
World Ranking qualification pathway		24 June 2024	—	5	Italy
World Ranking qualification pathway		24 June 2024	—	5	Argentina
World Ranking qualification pathway		24 June 2024	—	5	Serbia
World Ranking qualification pathway		24 June 2024	—	5	Egypt
Total				12	

==== Women's volleyball ====
Qualification		Date	Venue	Berths	Qualified team
Host nation		—		1	France
FIVB Olympic Qualification Tournaments	Pool A	16–24 September 2023	(China) Ningbo	2	Dominican Republic
FIVB Olympic Qualification Tournaments	Pool A	16–24 September 2023	(China) Ningbo	2	Serbia
FIVB Olympic Qualification Tournaments	Pool B	16–24 September 2023	(Japan) Tokyo	2	Turkey
FIVB Olympic Qualification Tournaments	Pool B	16–24 September 2023	(Japan) Tokyo	2	Brazil
FIVB Olympic Qualification Tournaments	Pool C	16–24 September 2023	(Poland) Łódź	2	United States
FIVB Olympic Qualification Tournaments	Pool C	16–24 September 2023	(Poland) Łódź	2	Poland
World Ranking qualification pathway		17 June 2024	—	5	Italy
World Ranking qualification pathway		17 June 2024	—	5	China
World Ranking qualification pathway		17 June 2024	—	5	Japan
World Ranking qualification pathway		17 June 2024	—	5	Netherlands
World Ranking qualification pathway		17 June 2024	—	5	Kenya
Total				12	

=== Beach volleyball ===
Twenty-four teams per gender will participate in the beach volleyball tournament with a maximum of two per NOC. As the host nation, France reserves the direct spot for both the men's and women's beach volleyball teams.

The remainder of the twenty-four team field must endure a tripartite qualification pathway to obtain a ticket for Paris 2024, abiding by the universality principle and respecting the two-team NOC limit. The initial spot will be directly awarded to the men's and women's winners, respectively, from the 2023 FIVB World Championships, scheduled for 6 to 15 October in Tlaxcala, Mexico, with the seventeen highest-ranked eligible pairs joining them in the field through the FIVB Olympic ranking list (based on the twelve best performances achieved as a pair) between 1 January 2023 and 10 June 2024. The final five spots will be attributed to the eligible NOCs from each of the five continental qualification tournaments (Africa – CAVB; Asia and Oceania – AVC; Europe – CEV; North America, Central America, and the Caribbean – NORCECA; and South America – CSV).

==== Men's beach volleyball ====
Qualification	Date	Host	Berths	Qualified NOC
Host nation	—		1	France
2023 FIVB Beach Volleyball World Championships	6–15 October 2023	(Mexico) Tlaxcala	1	Czech Republic
FIVB Beach Volleyball Olympic Ranking	9 June 2024	(Switzerland) Lausanne	17	Sweden
FIVB Beach Volleyball Olympic Ranking	9 June 2024	(Switzerland) Lausanne	17	Norway
FIVB Beach Volleyball Olympic Ranking	9 June 2024	(Switzerland) Lausanne	17	Germany
FIVB Beach Volleyball Olympic Ranking	9 June 2024	(Switzerland) Lausanne	17	Brazil
FIVB Beach Volleyball Olympic Ranking	9 June 2024	(Switzerland) Lausanne	17	United States
FIVB Beach Volleyball Olympic Ranking	9 June 2024	(Switzerland) Lausanne	17	Netherlands
FIVB Beach Volleyball Olympic Ranking	9 June 2024	(Switzerland) Lausanne	17	Brazil
FIVB Beach Volleyball Olympic Ranking	9 June 2024	(Switzerland) Lausanne	17	Italy
FIVB Beach Volleyball Olympic Ranking	9 June 2024	(Switzerland) Lausanne	17	Poland
FIVB Beach Volleyball Olympic Ranking	9 June 2024	(Switzerland) Lausanne	17	Netherlands
FIVB Beach Volleyball Olympic Ranking	9 June 2024	(Switzerland) Lausanne	17	Qatar
FIVB Beach Volleyball Olympic Ranking	9 June 2024	(Switzerland) Lausanne	17	United States
FIVB Beach Volleyball Olympic Ranking	9 June 2024	(Switzerland) Lausanne	17	Spain
FIVB Beach Volleyball Olympic Ranking	9 June 2024	(Switzerland) Lausanne	17	Italy
FIVB Beach Volleyball Olympic Ranking	9 June 2024	(Switzerland) Lausanne	17	Australia
FIVB Beach Volleyball Olympic Ranking	9 June 2024	(Switzerland) Lausanne	17	Cuba
FIVB Beach Volleyball Olympic Ranking	9 June 2024	(Switzerland) Lausanne	17	Austria
2023–2024 CEV Continental Cup Final	13–16 June 2024	(Latvia) Jūrmala	1	France
2023–2024 CAVB Continental Cup Final	20–23 June 2024	Martil	1	Morocco
2023–2024 AVC Continental Cup Final	21–23 June 2024	(China) Ningbo	1	Australia
2023–2024 CSV Continental Cup Final	21–23 June 2024	(Chile) Iquique	1	Chile
2023–2024 NORCECA Continental Cup Final	21–23 June 2024	Tlaxcala	1	Canada
Total			24	

==== Women's beach volleyball ====
Qualification	Date	Host	Berths	Qualified NOC
Host nation	—		1	France
2023 FIVB Beach Volleyball World Championships	6–15 October 2023	(Mexico) Tlaxcala	1	United States
FIVB Beach Volleyball Olympic Ranking	9 June 2024	(Switzerland) Lausanne	17	Brazil
FIVB Beach Volleyball Olympic Ranking	9 June 2024	(Switzerland) Lausanne	17	United States
FIVB Beach Volleyball Olympic Ranking	9 June 2024	(Switzerland) Lausanne	17	Canada
FIVB Beach Volleyball Olympic Ranking	9 June 2024	(Switzerland) Lausanne	17	Brazil
FIVB Beach Volleyball Olympic Ranking	9 June 2024	(Switzerland) Lausanne	17	Netherlands
FIVB Beach Volleyball Olympic Ranking	9 June 2024	(Switzerland) Lausanne	17	Switzerland
FIVB Beach Volleyball Olympic Ranking	9 June 2024	(Switzerland) Lausanne	17	Latvia
FIVB Beach Volleyball Olympic Ranking	9 June 2024	(Switzerland) Lausanne	17	China
FIVB Beach Volleyball Olympic Ranking	9 June 2024	(Switzerland) Lausanne	17	Italy
FIVB Beach Volleyball Olympic Ranking	9 June 2024	(Switzerland) Lausanne	17	Germany
FIVB Beach Volleyball Olympic Ranking	9 June 2024	(Switzerland) Lausanne	17	Australia
FIVB Beach Volleyball Olympic Ranking	9 June 2024	(Switzerland) Lausanne	17	Switzerland
FIVB Beach Volleyball Olympic Ranking	9 June 2024	(Switzerland) Lausanne	17	Spain
FIVB Beach Volleyball Olympic Ranking	9 June 2024	(Switzerland) Lausanne	17	Germany
FIVB Beach Volleyball Olympic Ranking	9 June 2024	(Switzerland) Lausanne	17	France
FIVB Beach Volleyball Olympic Ranking	9 June 2024	(Switzerland) Lausanne	17	Lithuania
FIVB Beach Volleyball Olympic Ranking	9 June 2024	(Switzerland) Lausanne	17	Spain
2023–2024 CEV Continental Cup Final	13–16 June 2024	(Latvia) Jūrmala	1	Czech Republic^{a}
2023–2024 CSV Continental Cup Final	14–16 June 2024	(Paraguay) Asunción	1	Paraguay
2023–2024 CAVB Continental Cup Final	20–23 June 2024	Martil	1	Egypt
2023–2024 AVC Continental Cup Final	21–23 June 2024	(China) Ningbo	1	Japan
2023–2024 NORCECA Continental Cup Final	21–23 June 2024	Tlaxcala	1	Canada
Total			24	

Notes
^{a} The Netherlands originally won the CEV Continental Cup. However, there was no athlete who met the requirements set by the Dutch NOC. Therefore, the NOC forfeited quota spot, and the Czech Republic as the runners-up received the reallocated quota spot.

== Men's indoor tournament ==
=== Pool A ===
Pos	Team	Pld	W	L	Pts	SW	SL	SR	SPW	SPL	SPR	Qualification
1	Slovenia	3	3	0	8	9	3	3.000	282	252	1.119	Quarterfinals
2	France (H)	3	2	1	6	8	5	1.600	290	260	1.115	Quarterfinals
3	Serbia	3	1	2	3	5	8	0.625	256	293	0.874	
4	Canada	3	0	3	1	3	9	0.333	254	277	0.917	

Source: Olympics
Rules for classification: Tiebreakers
(H) Host

=== Pool B ===
Pos	Team	Pld	W	L	Pts	SW	SL	SR	SPW	SPL	SPR	Qualification
1	Italy	3	3	0	9	9	2	4.500	269	224	1.201	Quarterfinals
2	Poland	3	2	1	5	7	5	1.400	260	256	1.016	Quarterfinals
3	Brazil	3	1	2	4	6	6	1.000	273	241	1.133	Quarterfinals
4	Egypt	3	0	3	0	0	9	0.000	144	225	0.640	

Source: Olympics
Rules for classification: Tiebreakers

=== Pool C ===
Pos	Team	Pld	W	L	Pts	SW	SL	SR	SPW	SPL	SPR	Qualification
1	United States	3	3	0	8	9	3	3.000	270	232	1.164	Quarterfinals
2	Germany	3	2	1	6	8	5	1.600	287	264	1.087	Quarterfinals
3	Japan	3	1	2	4	6	7	0.857	278	292	0.952	Quarterfinals
4	Argentina	3	0	3	0	1	9	0.111	196	243	0.807	

Source: Olympics
Rules for classification: Tiebreakers

=== Combined ranking ===
Pos	Pool	Team	Pld	W	L	Pts	SW	SL	SR	SPW	SPL	SPR	Rank
1	B	Italy	3	3	0	9	9	2	4.500	269	224	1.201	First in each of the pools
2	C	United States	3	3	0	8	9	3	3.000	270	232	1.164	First in each of the pools
3	A	Slovenia	3	3	0	8	9	3	3.000	282	252	1.119	First in each of the pools
4	A	France (H)	3	2	1	6	8	5	1.600	290	260	1.115	Second in each of the pools
5	C	Germany	3	2	1	6	8	5	1.600	287	264	1.087	Second in each of the pools
6	B	Poland	3	2	1	5	7	5	1.400	260	256	1.016	Second in each of the pools
7	B	Brazil	3	1	2	4	6	6	1.000	273	241	1.133	Third in each of the pools
8	C	Japan	3	1	2	4	6	7	0.857	278	292	0.952	Third in each of the pools
9	A	Serbia	3	1	2	3	5	8	0.625	256	293	0.874	Third in the pool
10	A	Canada	3	0	3	1	3	9	0.333	254	277	0.917	Fourth in each of the pools
11	C	Argentina	3	0	3	0	1	9	0.111	196	243	0.807	Fourth in each of the pools
12	B	Egypt	3	0	3	0	0	9	0.000	144	225	0.640	Fourth in each of the pools

Source: Olympics
Rules for classification: Tiebreakers
(H) Host

=== Knockout stage ===
Quarterfinals
5 August
Italy	3
Japan	2
5 August
France	3
Germany	2
5 August
Slovenia	1
Poland	3
5 August
United States	3
Brazil	1

Semifinals
7 August
Italy	0
France	3
7 August
Poland	3
United States	2

Gold medal match
10 August
France	3
Poland	0
Bronze medal match
9 August
Italy	0
United States	3

=== Final standings ===
Rank	Team
1st place, gold medalist(s)	France
2nd place, silver medalist(s)	Poland
3rd place, bronze medalist(s)	United States
4	Italy
5	Slovenia
6	Germany
7	Japan
8	Brazil
9	Serbia
10	Canada
11	Argentina
12	Egypt

== Women's indoor tournament ==
=== Pool A ===
Pos	Team	Pld	W	L	Pts	SW	SL	SR	SPW	SPL	SPR	Qualification
1	China	3	3	0	8	9	3	3.000	277	249	1.112	Quarter-finals
2	United States	3	2	1	6	8	5	1.600	286	278	1.029	Quarter-finals
3	Serbia	3	1	2	4	6	6	1.000	271	257	1.054	Quarter-finals
4	France (H)	3	0	3	0	0	9	0.000	183	233	0.785	

Source: Olympics
Rules for classification: Tiebreakers
(H) Host

=== Pool B ===
Pos	Team	Pld	W	L	Pts	SW	SL	SR	SPW	SPL	SPR	Qualification
1	Brazil	3	3	0	9	9	0	MAX	238	165	1.442	Quarter-finals
2	Poland	3	2	1	6	6	4	1.500	244	230	1.061	Quarter-finals
3	Japan	3	1	2	3	4	6	0.667	226	224	1.009	
4	Kenya	3	0	3	0	0	9	0.000	136	225	0.604	

Source: Olympics
Rules for classification: Tiebreakers

=== Pool C ===
Pos	Team	Pld	W	L	Pts	SW	SL	SR	SPW	SPL	SPR	Qualification
1	Italy	3	3	0	9	9	1	9.000	253	199	1.271	Quarter-finals
2	Turkey	3	2	1	5	6	6	1.000	250	262	0.954	Quarter-finals
3	Dominican Republic	3	1	2	3	5	7	0.714	264	284	0.930	Quarter-finals
4	Netherlands	3	0	3	1	3	9	0.333	260	282	0.922	

Source: Olympics
Rules for classification: Tiebreakers

=== Combined ranking ===
Pos	Pool	Team	Pld	W	L	Pts	SW	SL	SR	SPW	SPL	SPR	Rank
1	B	Brazil	3	3	0	9	9	0	MAX	238	165	1.442	First in each of the pools
2	C	Italy	3	3	0	9	9	1	9.000	253	199	1.271	First in each of the pools
3	A	China	3	3	0	8	9	3	3.000	277	249	1.112	First in each of the pools
4	A	United States	3	2	1	6	8	5	1.600	286	278	1.029	Second in each of the pools
5	B	Poland	3	2	1	6	6	4	1.500	244	230	1.061	Second in each of the pools
6	C	Turkey	3	2	1	5	6	6	1.000	250	262	0.954	Second in each of the pools
7	A	Serbia	3	1	2	4	6	6	1.000	271	257	1.054	Third in each of the pools
8	C	Dominican Republic	3	1	2	3	5	7	0.714	264	284	0.930	Third in each of the pools
9	B	Japan	3	1	2	3	4	6	0.667	226	224	1.009	Third in the pool
10	C	Netherlands	3	0	3	1	3	9	0.333	260	282	0.922	Fourth in each of the pools
11	A	France (H)	3	0	3	0	0	9	0.000	183	233	0.785	Fourth in each of the pools
12	B	Kenya	3	0	3	0	0	9	0.000	136	225	0.604	Fourth in each of the pools

Source: Olympics
Rules for classification: Tiebreakers
(H) Host

=== Knockout stage ===
Quarter-finals
6 August
Brazil	3
Dominican Republic	0
6 August
United States	3
Poland	0
6 August
China	2
Turkey	3
6 August
Italy	3
Serbia	0

Semi-finals
8 August
Brazil	2
United States	3
8 August
Turkey	0
Italy	3

Gold medal match
11 August
United States	0
Italy	3
Bronze medal match
10 August
Brazil	3
Turkey	1

=== Final standings ===
Rank	Team
1st place, gold medalist(s)	Italy
2nd place, silver medalist(s)	United States
3rd place, bronze medalist(s)	Brazil
4	Turkey
5	China
6	Poland
7	Serbia
8	Dominican Republic
9	Japan
10	Netherlands
11	France
12	Kenya

== Men's beach volleyball competition ==
=== Knockout stage ===
Round of 16
5 August
Cherif – Ahmed (QAT)	2
M. Grimalt – E. Grimalt (CHI)	0
5 August
Partain – Benesh (USA)	2
Cottafava – Nicolai (ITA)	0
4 August
Evandro – Arthur (BRA)	2
Van de Velde – Immers (NED)	0
4 August
Åhman – Hellvig (SWE)	2
Díaz – Alayo (CUB)	1
4 August
Ehlers – Wickler (GER)	2
George – André (BRA)	0
4 August
Perušič – Schweiner (CZE)	0
Boermans – De Groot (NED)	2
5 August
Bryl – Łosiak (POL)	0
Herrera – Gavira (ESP)	2
5 August
Evans – Budinger (USA)	0
Mol – Sørum (NOR)	2

Quarter-finals
7 August
Cherif – Ahmed (QAT)	2
Partain – Benesh (USA)	0
6 August
Evandro – Arthur (BRA)	0
Åhman – Hellvig (SWE)	2
6 August
Ehlers – Wickler (GER)	2
Boermans – De Groot (NED)	0
7 August
Herrera – Gavira (ESP)	0
Mol – Sørum (NOR)	2

Semi-finals
8 August
Cherif – Ahmed (QAT)	0
Åhman – Hellvig (SWE)	2
8 August
Ehlers – Wickler (GER)	2
Mol – Sørum (NOR)	1

Gold medal
10 August
Åhman – Hellvig (SWE)	2
Ehlers – Wickler (GER)	0
Bronze medal
10 August
Cherif – Ahmed (QAT)	0
Mol – Sørum (NOR)	2

=== Final standings ===
Rank	Team
Gold medal	Åhman – Hellvig (SWE)
Silver medal	Ehlers – Wickler (GER)
Bronze medal	Mol – Sørum (NOR)
4	Cherif – Ahmed (QAT)
5	Evandro – Arthur (BRA)
5	Boermans – De Groot (NED)
5	Herrera – Gavira (ESP)
5	Partain – Benesh (USA)
9	Díaz – Alayo (CUB)
9	George – André (BRA)
9	M. Grimalt – E. Grimalt (CHI)
9	Perušič – Schweiner (CZE)
9	Cottafava – Nicolai (ITA)
9	Van de Velde – Immers (NED)
9	Bryl – Łosiak (POL)
9	Evans – Budinger (USA)
17	Hodges – Schubert (AUS)
17	Schachter – Dearing (CAN)
19	Nicolaidis – Carracher (AUS)
19	Hörl – Horst (AUT)
19	Bassereau – Lyneel (FRA)
19	Krou – Gauthier-Rat (FRA)
19	Ranghieri – Carambula (ITA)
19	Abicha – El Graoui (MAR)

== Women's beach volleyball competition ==
=== Knockout stage ===
Round of 16
5 August
Ana Patricia – Duda (BRA)	2
Akiko – Ishii (JPN)	0
5 August
Müller – Tillmann (GER)	1
Tīna – Anastasija (LAT)	2
4 August
Carol – Bárbara (BRA)	0
Mariafe – Clancy (AUS)	2
4 August
Xue – X. Y. Xia (CHN)	0
Esmée – Zoé (SUI)	2
4 August
Hughes – Cheng (USA)	2
Gottardi – Menegatti (ITA)	1
4 August
Liliana – Paula (ESP)	0
Hüberli – Betschart (SUI)	2
5 August
Álvarez M – Moreno (ESP)	2
Stam – Schoon (NED)	1
5 August
Melissa – Brandie (CAN)	2
Nuss – Kloth (USA)	0

Quarter-finals
7 August
Ana Patricia – Duda (BRA)	2
Tīna – Anastasija (LAT)	0
6 August
Mariafe – Clancy (AUS)	2
Esmée – Zoé (SUI)	1
6 August
Hughes – Cheng (USA)	0
Hüberli – Betschart (SUI)	2
7 August
Álvarez M – Moreno (ESP)	0
Melissa – Brandie (CAN)	2

Semi-finals
8 August
Ana Patricia – Duda (BRA)	2
Mariafe – Clancy (AUS)	1
8 August
Hüberli – Betschart (SUI)	1
Melissa – Brandie (CAN)	2

Gold medal
9 August
Ana Patricia – Duda (BRA)	2
Melissa – Brandie (CAN)	1
Bronze medal
9 August
Mariafe – Clancy (AUS)	0
Hüberli – Betschart (SUI)	2

=== Final standings ===
Rank	Team
Gold medal	Ana Patrícia – Duda Lisboa (BRA)
Silver medal	Melissa – Brandie (CAN)
Bronze medal	Hüberli – Betschart (SUI)
4	Mariafe – Clancy (AUS)
5	Tīna – Anastasija (LAT)
5	Esmée – Zoé (SUI)
5	Álvarez M – Moreno (ESP)
5	Hughes – Cheng (USA)
9	Carol – Bárbara (BRA)
9	Xue – X. Y. Xia (CHN)
9	Müller – Tillmann (GER)
9	Gottardi – Menegatti (ITA)
9	Akiko – Ishii (JPN)
9	Stam – Schoon (NED)
9	Liliana – Paula (ESP)
9	Nuss – Kloth (USA)
17	Hermannová – Štochlová (CZE)
17	Placette – Richard (FRA)
19	Bansley – Bukovec (CAN)
19	Abdelhady – Elghobashy (EGY)
19	Vieira – Chamereau (FRA)
19	Ludwig – Lippmann (GER)
19	Paulikienė – Raupelytė (LTU)
19	Poletti – Michelle (PAR)

== See also ==
- Beach volleyball at the 2023 Pan American Games
- Volleyball at the 2023 Pan American Games
- Sitting volleyball at the 2024 Summer Paralympics
