= Marwa Abdelhady =

Egyptian beach volleyball player

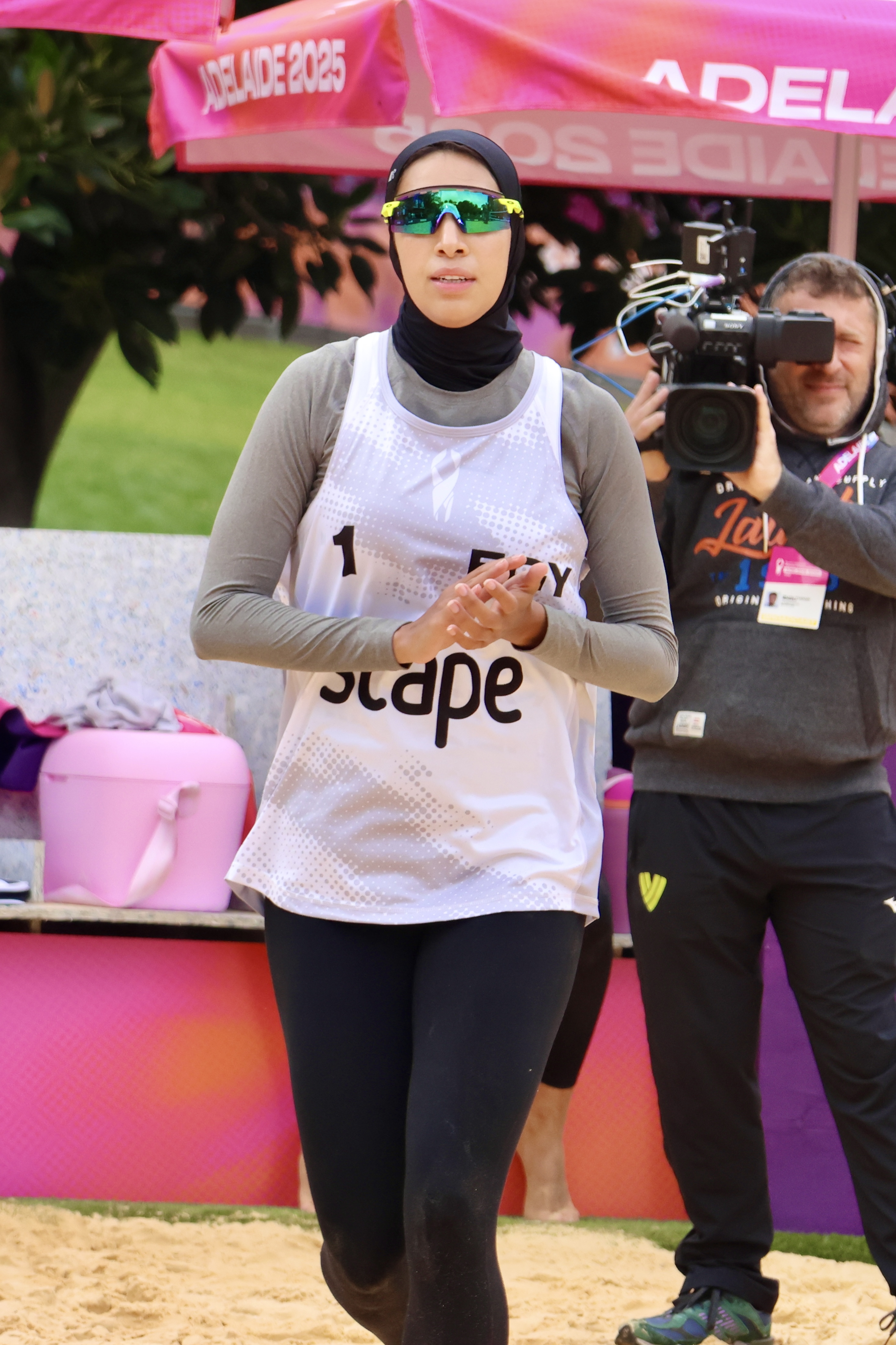
- Abdelhady at the 2025 World Championships

Personal information
- Nationality: Egyptian
- Born: 22 December 1997 (age 28)
- Height: 182 cm (6 ft 0 in)

Beach volleyball information

Current teammate
Teammate
Doaa Elghobashy

Marwa Abdelhady (born 22 December 1997) is an Egyptian beach volleyball player. With Doaa Elghobashy she played at 2024 Summer Olympics in Paris but they lost all group stage matches and did not advance to the final rounds.
