= Clémence Vieira =

French beach volleyball player

Clemence Vieira
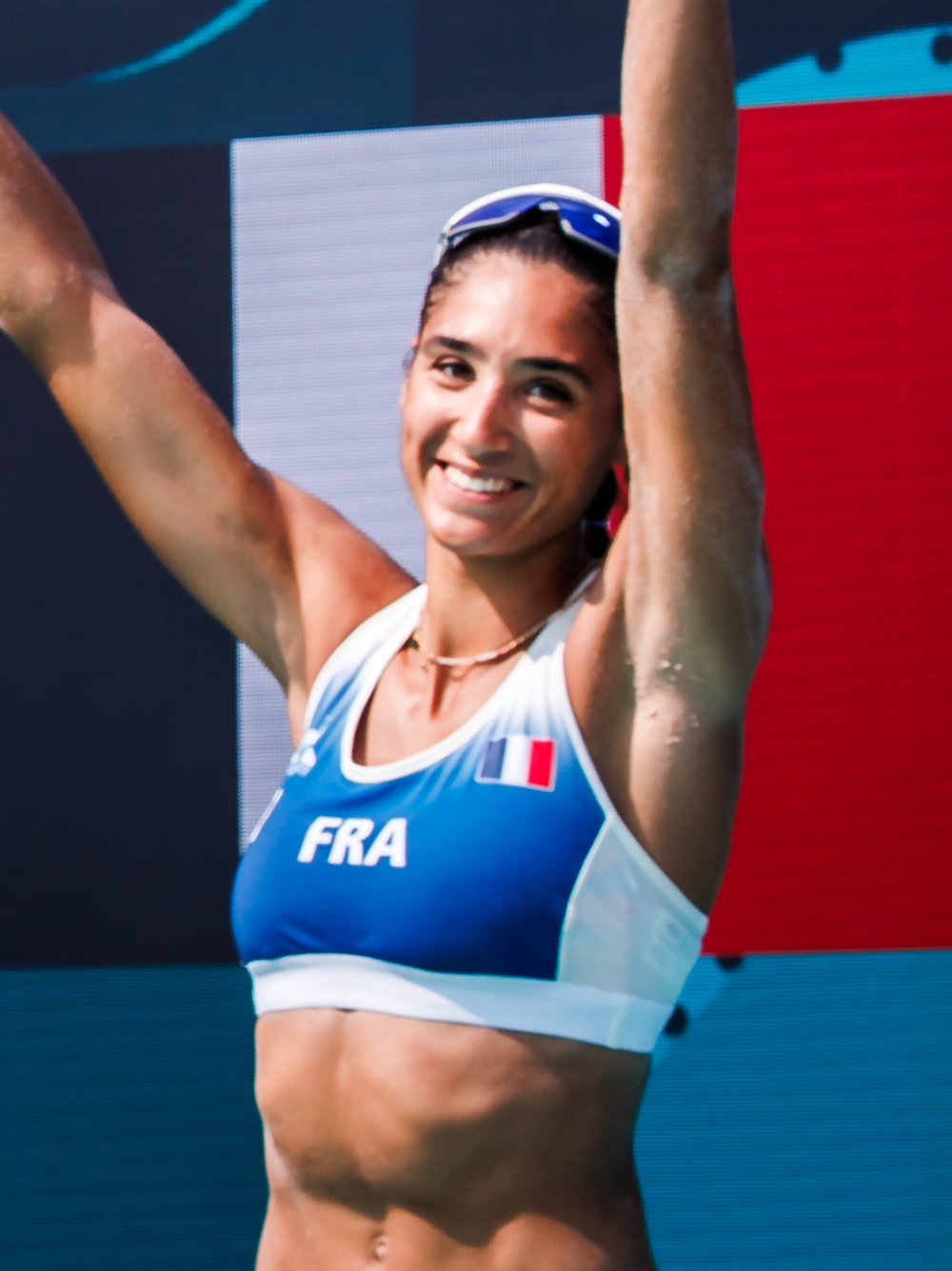
- Vieira at the 2024 Summer Olympics

Personal information
- Nationality: French
- Born: 1 November 2000 (age 25); Grenoble, France
- Height: 1.77 m (5 ft 10 in)

Beach volleyball information

Current teammate
Teammate
Aline Chamereau

Clemence Vieira (born 1 November 2000) is a French beach volleyball player. With Aline Chamereau, she played at 2024 Summer Olympics in Paris. In 2025 with Chamereau she got a silver medal at the European Beach Volleyball Championships in Düsseldorf, this is the first medal for France in a Beach Volleyball Championships since 1999.
