= 2023–2024 AVC Beach Volleyball Continental Cup =

Beach volleyball double-gender event

The 2023–2024 AVC Beach Volleyball Continental Cup was a beach volleyball double-gender event for teams representing Asian countries. The winners of the event qualified for the 2024 Summer Olympics.

== Men ==
=== Preliminary round ===
==== Central Asia ====
- Host: Cox's Bazar, Bangladesh

Quarterfinals
8 September 2023
India	2
Bhutan	0

Semifinals
10 September 2023
Bangladesh	0
India	2
10 September 2023
Iran	2
Kazakhstan	0

Final
11 September 2023
India	0
Iran	2
3rd place
11 September 2023
Bangladesh	0
Kazakhstan	2

- Iran advanced to the final round.
- India advanced to the semifinal round.

==== Eastern Asia ====
- Host: Tangshan, China

Semifinals
31 August 2023
Japan	2
Hong Kong	0

Final
1 September 2023
China	2
Japan	0

- China (as the hosts) and Japan advanced to the final round.
- Hong Kong advanced to the semifinal round.

==== Oceania ====
- Host: Port Vila, Vanuatu

Semifinals
2 September 2023
New Zealand	2
Tuvalu	0
2 September 2023
Vanuatu	2
Solomon Islands	0

Final
3 September 2023
New Zealand	2
Vanuatu	0
3rd place
3 September 2023
Tuvalu	0
Solomon Islands	2

- Australia (as the defending champions) and New Zealand advanced to the final round.
- Vanuatu advanced to the semifinal round.

==== Southeastern Asia ====
- Host: Phnom Penh, Cambodia

11–14 May 2023

Pos	Team	Pld	W	L	Pts	VIE	PHI	CAM	TLS	LAO
1	Vietnam	4	4	0	8	—	2–1	2–0	2–0	2–0
2	Philippines	4	3	1	7	1–2	—	2–1	2–0	2–0
3	Cambodia	4	2	2	6	0–2	1–2	—	2–0	2–0
4	Timor-Leste	4	1	3	5	0–2	0–2	0–2	—	2–0
5	Laos	4	0	4	4	0–2	0–2	0–2	0–2	—

Source: SEA Games Official website^{[usurped]}

Pos	Team	Pld	W	L	Pts	INA	THA	MAS	SGP
1	Indonesia	3	3	0	6	—	2–1	2–0	2–0
2	Thailand	3	1	2	4	1–2	—	0–2	2–0
3	Malaysia	3	1	2	4	0–2	2–0	—	1–2
4	Singapore	3	1	2	4	0–2	0–2	2–1	—

Source: SEA Games Official website^{[usurped]}

Semifinals
15 May 2023
Vietnam	0
Thailand	2
15 May 2023
Indonesia	2
Philippines	0

Final
16 May 2023
Thailand	1
Indonesia	2
3rd place
16 May 2023
Vietnam	0
Philippines	2

- Indonesia advanced to the final round.
- Thailand advanced to the semifinal round.

==== Western Asia ====
- Host: Doha, Qatar

Semifinals
21 February 2023
Qatar	2
Palestine	1
21 February 2023
Oman	2
Saudi Arabia	0

Final
23 February 2023
Qatar	2
Oman	1
3rd place
22 February 2023
Palestine	2
Saudi Arabia	1

- Qatar advanced to the final round.
- Oman advanced to the semifinal round.

=== Semifinal round ===
- Host: Ningbo, China

Semifinals
17 June 2024
Thailand	2
Solomon Islands	0
17 June 2024
Kazakhstan	1
Oman	2

Final
18 June 2024
Thailand	1
Oman	2

=== Final round ===
- Host: Ningbo, China

Quarterfinals
21 June 2024
China	2
Oman	0
21 June 2024
Japan	0
Iran	2
21 June 2024
Australia	2
Qatar	0
21 June 2024
New Zealand	1
Indonesia	2

Semifinals
22 June 2024
China	2
Iran	0
22 June 2024
Australia	2
Indonesia	0

Final
23 June 2024
China	1
Australia	2

== Women ==
=== Preliminary round ===
==== Central Asia ====
- Host: Cox's Bazar, Bangladesh

Quarterfinals
8 September 2023
India	0
Kyrgyzstan	2

Semifinals
9 September 2023
Bangladesh	0
Kyrgyzstan	2
9 September 2023
Uzbekistan	0
Kazakhstan	2

Final
11 September 2023
Kyrgyzstan	0
Kazakhstan	2
3rd place
11 September 2023
Bangladesh	0
Uzbekistan	2

- Kazakhstan advanced to the final round.
- Kyrgyzstan advanced to the semifinal round.

==== Eastern Asia ====
- Host: Tangshan, China

Final
31 August 2023
Japan	2
Hong Kong	0

- China (as the defending champions) and Japan advanced to the final round.
- Hong Kong advanced to the semifinal round.

==== Oceania ====
- Host: Port Vila, Vanuatu

Semifinals
2 September 2023
Australia	1
New Zealand	2
2 September 2023
Vanuatu	2
Solomon Islands	0

Final
3 September 2023
New Zealand	2
Vanuatu	1
3rd place
3 September 2023
Australia	2
Solomon Islands	0

- New Zealand advanced to the final round.
- Vanuatu advanced to the semifinal round.

==== Southeastern Asia ====
- Host: Phnom Penh, Cambodia

11–14 May 2023

Pos	Team	Pld	W	L	Pts	VIE	PHI	CAM
1	Indonesia	2	2	0	4	—	2–0	2–0
2	Singapore	2	1	1	3	0–2	—	2–0
3	Cambodia	2	0	2	2	0–2	0–2	—

Source: SEA Games Official website^{[usurped]}

Pos	Team	Pld	W	L	Pts	THA	VIE	PHI	MAS
1	Thailand	3	3	0	6	—	2–0	2–1	2–0
2	Vietnam	3	2	1	5	0–2	—	2–1	2–0
3	Philippines	3	1	2	4	1–2	1–2	—	2–0
4	Malaysia	3	0	3	3	0–2	0–2	0–2	—

Source: SEA Games Official website^{[usurped]}

Semifinals
15 May 2023
Indonesia	2
Vietnam	0
15 May 2023
Thailand	2
Singapore	0

Final
16 May 2023
Indonesia	1
Thailand	2
3rd place
16 May 2023
Vietnam	2
Singapore	0

- Thailand advanced to the final round.
- Indonesia advanced to the semifinal round.

==== Western Asia ====
- Host: Doha, Qatar

Semifinals
22 February 2023
Lebanon	2
Jordan	0

Final
23 February 2023
Qatar	0
Lebanon	2

- Lebanon advanced to the final round.
- Qatar advanced to the semifinal round.

=== Semifinal round ===
- Host: Ningbo, China

Semifinals
17 June 2024
Vanuatu	2
Kyrgyzstan	0
17 June 2024
Hong Kong	0
Indonesia	2

Final
18 June 2024
Vanuatu	1
Indonesia	2

=== Final round ===
- Host: Ningbo, China

Quarterfinals
21 June 2024
China	2
Lebanon	0
21 June 2024
New Zealand	2
Vanuatu	0
21 June 2024
Japan	2
Indonesia	0
21 June 2024
Thailand	2
Kazakhstan	0

Semifinals
22 June 2024
China	2
New Zealand	1
22 June 2024
Japan	2
Thailand	0

Final
23 June 2024
China	1
Japan	2
