= Tanja Hüberli =

Swiss beach volleyball player (born 1992)

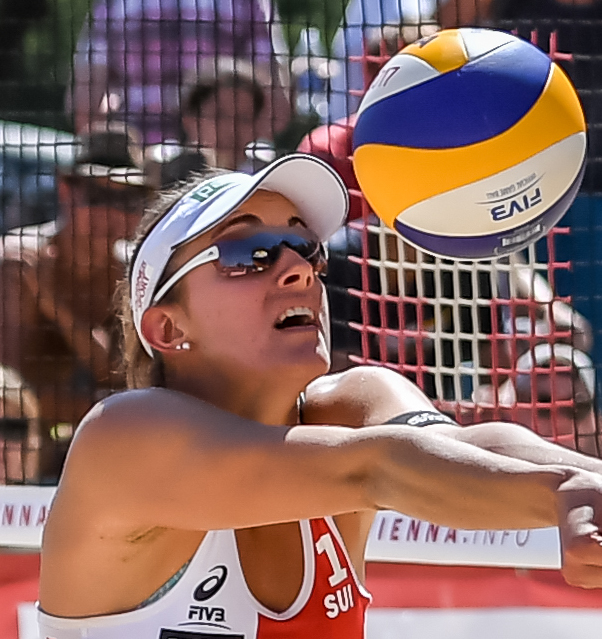
- Hüberli in 2017

Personal information
- Nationality: Switzerland
- Born: 27 August 1992 (age 34); Thalwil, Switzerland
- Height: 1.90 m (6 ft 3 in)

Beach volleyball information

Current teammate
Years	Teammate
2026–present	Nina Brunner

Previous teammates
Years	Teammate
2025; 2016–2024; 2013–2015	Leona Kernen; Nina Brunner; Tanja Goricanec
Honours
Women's beach volleyball
Representing Switzerland
Olympic Games
Bronze medal – third place	2024 Paris	Beach
European Championships
Gold medal – first place	2021 Vienna	Beach
Gold medal – first place	2023 Vienna	Beach
Silver medal – second place	2014 Cagliari	Beach
Silver medal – second place	2018 Netherlands	Beach
Silver medal – second place	2022 Munich	Beach
World Beach Pro Tour
Gold medal – first place	2024 Tepic	Beach
Gold medal – first place	2024 Hamburg	Beach
Silver medal – second place	2022 Hamburg	Beach
Silver medal – second place	2023 Doha	Beach
Silver medal – second place	2024 Espinho	Beach
Silver medal – second place	2025 Yucatan	Beach
Bronze medal – third place	2022 Doha	Beach
Bronze medal – third place	2022 Ostrava	Beach
World Tour
Gold medal – first place	2020 Baden	Beach
Silver medal – second place	2021 Sochi	Beach
Bronze medal – third place	2016 Klagenfurt	Beach
Bronze medal – third place	2017 Porec	Beach
Bronze medal – third place	2018 The Hauge	Beach
Bronze medal – third place	2018 Moscow	Beach

Tanja Hüberli (born 27 August 1992) is a Swiss beach volleyball player. She competed in the 2020 Summer Olympics representing Switzerland with her partner Nina Betschart. They finished ninth overall. They again competed in the 2024 Summer Olympics.
