= Aline Chamereau =

French beach volleyball player (born 1996)

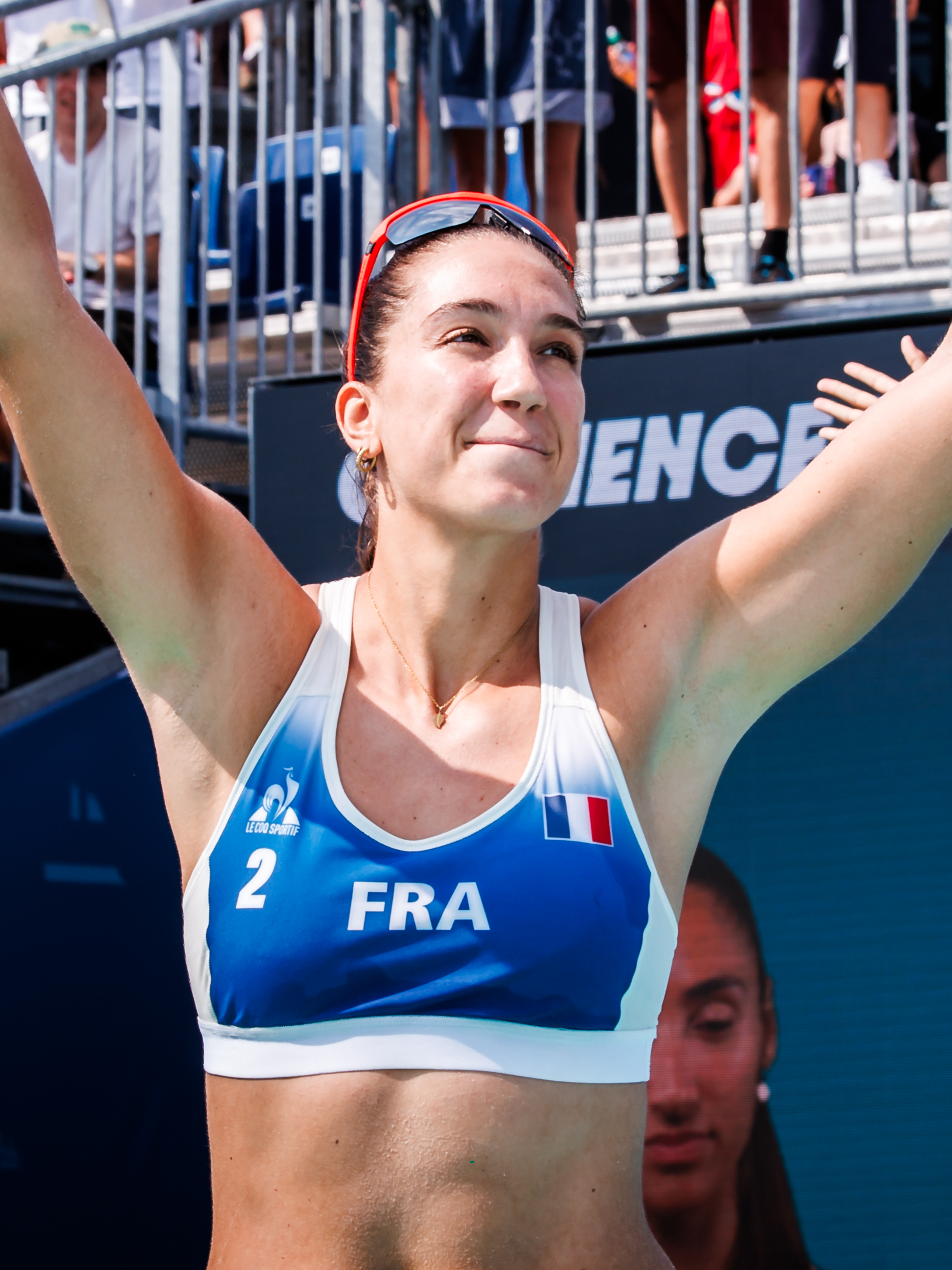
- Chamereau at the 2024 Summer Olympics

Personal information
- Nationality: French
- Born: 6 March 1996 (age 30)
- Height: 1.86 m (6 ft 1 in)

Beach volleyball information

Current teammate
Teammate
Clémence Vieira
Honours
Women's beach volleyball
Representing France
Mediterranean Games
Silver medal – second place	2018 Tarragona	Team

Aline Chamereau (born 6 March 1996) is a French beach volleyball player. With Clémence Vieira she played at 2024 Summer Olympics in Paris. In 2025 with Vieira she got a silver medal at the European Beach Volleyball Championships in Düsseldorf, this is the first medal for France in a Beach Volleyball Championships since 1999.
