= Daniela Álvarez Mendoza =

Spanish beach volleyball player

Daniela Álvarez
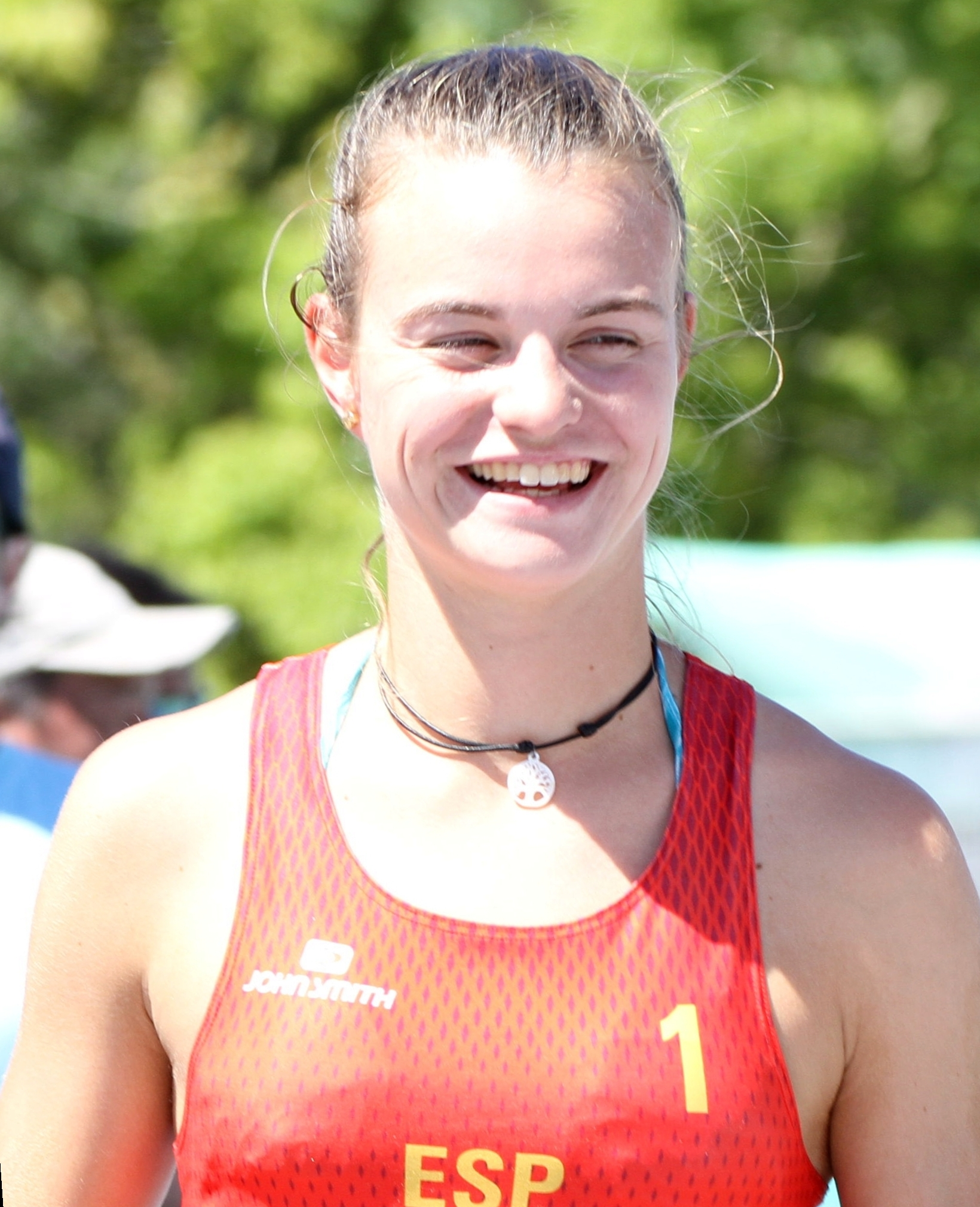
- Álvarez in 2018

Personal information
- Full name: Daniela Álvarez Mendoza
- Nationality: Spanish
- Born: 27 November 2001 (age 24); Gijón, Spain
- Hometown: Gijón, Asturias Spain
- Height: 187 cm (6 ft 2 in)
- Education: Texas Christian University

Beach volleyball information

Current teammate
Teammate
Tania Moreno
Medal record
Women's beach volleyball
Representing team Spain
World Tour
Gold medal – first place	2024 Women BV Nations Cup Pool C - Madrid	Beach
Gold medal – first place	2022 CEV U22 ECH - Vlissingen	Beach
Gold medal – first place	2021 Menorca	Beach
Gold medal – first place	2021 Laredo (Cantabria)	Beach
Gold medal – first place	2019 Madrid	Beach
Silver medal – second place	2023 CEV European Championships - Vienna	Beach
Silver medal – second place	2023 BPT Challenge Nuvali	Beach
Silver medal – second place	2022 FISU Championships - Maceio, Brazil	Beach
Silver medal – second place	2021 Phuket	Beach
Silver medal – second place	2019 Melilla	Beach
Silver medal – second place	2019 Laredo	Beach
Silver medal – second place	2019 Ayamonte	Beach
Silver medal – second place	2018 Ayamonte	Beach
Bronze medal – third place	2024 BPT Challenge Xiamen	Beach
Bronze medal – third place	2023 BPT Challenge Goa	Beach
Bronze medal – third place	2022 Balikesir	Beach
Bronze medal – third place	2021 Madrid	Beach
Bronze medal – third place	2019 Udonthani	Beach
Bronze medal – third place	2019 CEV U20 ECH - Göteborg	Beach
Bronze medal – third place	2019 CEV U22 ECH - Antalya	Beach
Bronze medal – third place	2019 Tarragona	Beach
Bronze medal – third place	2018 CEV Youth Continental Cup Final - Baden	Beach
Bronze medal – third place	2018 Nanjing	Beach
Bronze medal – third place	2018 Melilla	Beach
Bronze medal – third place	2018 CEV U22 ECH - Jurmala	Beach
Bronze medal – third place	2018 CEV U18 ECH - Brno	Beach
NCAA Beach Volleyball
Bronze medal – third place	2023 NCAA Beach Volleyball Championship	Beach

Daniela Álvarez Mendoza (Note: In this Spanish name, the first or paternal surname is Álvarez and the second or maternal family name is Mendoza.) (born 27 November 2001) is a Spanish beach volleyball player. She played with Tania Moreno at the 2024 Summer Olympics in Paris. She currently attends Texas Christian University, where she is part of the TCU beach volleyball team.

== Early life ==
Álvarez grew up in Asturias, Spain. She grew up playing tennis and dreaming of competing at the collegiate level in the United States. It wasn't until 2016, when she was encouraged by her friends to give volleyball a chance that she began to consider different options for her future. Using the strength and coordination she developed as a tennis player, Álvarez played beach volleyball for just nine days before being invited to travel to the National Training Center.

== College ==
Álvarez plays beach volleyball at Texas Christian University. She played in four consecutive seasons (2020, 2021, 2022, & 2023) and has one more year of NCAA eligibility due to the impacts of the COVID-19 pandemic.

=== Senior season (2023) ===
Before the 2023 season started, Álvarez was awarded preseason All-Conference Player of the Year and preseason All-Conference under CCSA. Along with partner Tania Moreno, Álvarez was awarded AVCA First-Team All-American, AVCA Top Flight and unanimously voted AVCA’s Pair of the Year. Throughout the season, the duo was awarded CCSA pair of the week three times (8 March 15 March, 29 March). Álvarez lived up to her accolades with the best record on the team from the Spring 2023 season, 37-1, and hit her 75th career win milestone.

=== Junior season (2022) ===
Before the 2022 season began, Álvarez was awarded preseason CCSA All-Conference awards; preseason Player of the Year and preseason All-Conference. She quickly lived up to these expectations when, for the second time in her career, was awarded both CCSA and AVCA Pair of the Week honors after season debuts (26–27 February). Álvarez played all matches from the No. 1 position, with Team Spain partner, Tania Moreno Mateeva, the duo racked up 23 victories on the regular season with 11 over ranked opponents. The pairing took notable victories over No. 1 UCLA, No. 4 Florida State, No. 4 LSU, No. 8 Cal Poly and No. 9 Hawaii. They finished the season 28-6 as a pairing with 14 of those victories over ranked opponents. The pair received the AVCA top flight award proving they are one of the top pairings in the country, first in program history to be awarded CCSA Pair of the Year with partner Moreno, awarded All-CCSA Conference team honors, and first team AVCA All-American.

=== Sophomore season (2021) ===
Álvarez played all but one match at the No. 1 position with Team Spain partner, Tania Moreno Mateeva, where they went 27-9 for the season. The Álvarez/Moreno duo was one of the top pairings in the country; They were the first pairing in TCU program history to be awarded AVCA Pair of the Week (27–28 February), first in program history to be awarded All-CCSA Freshman Team honors and All-CCSA 1st team honors, set program records for most wins by a freshman pairing (previously 26 wins), and set program record for most ranked wins by a freshman pair.

=== Freshman season (2020) ===
Álvarez won five matches in her first season of collegiate action before the season was cut short due to the pandemic.

== Awards ==
- Preseason All-Conference Player of the Year - 2023
- Preseason All-Conference - 2023
- 75th Career Win Milestone - 2023
- AVCA First Team All-American - 2023
- AVCA Top Flight - 2023
- AVCA Pair of the Year - 2023
- AVCA 1st Team All-American - 2022
- CCSA Pair of the Year - 2022
- CCSA All-Conference Team - 2022
- CCSA Preseason Player of the Year - 2022
- AVCA Topflight Award, No. 1 - 2022
- AVCA 1st Team All-American - 2021
- All-CCSA 1st Team - 2021
- All-CCSA Freshman Team - 2021
- AVCA Topflight Award, No. 1 - 2021
