= Tania Moreno =

Spanish beachvolleyball player

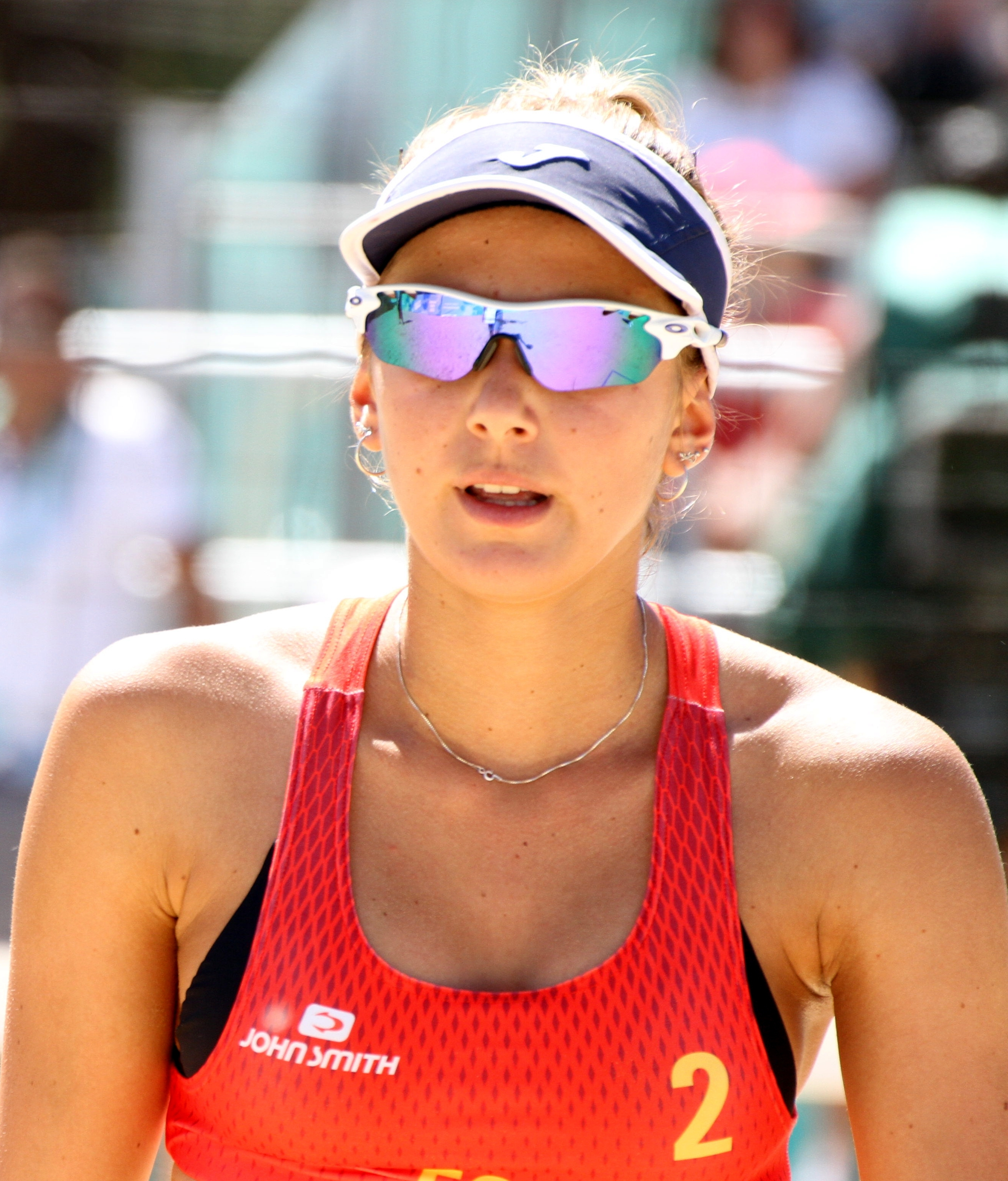
- Moreno in 2018

Personal information
- Full name: Tania Moreno Matveeva
- Nationality: Spanish
- Born: 29 January 2002 (age 24); Madrid, Spain
- Hometown: Madrid Spain
- Height: 174 cm (5 ft 9 in)
- Education: Texas Christian University

Beach volleyball information

Current teammate
Teammate
Daniela Álvarez Mendoza
Medal record
Women's beach volleyball
Representing Spain
World Tour
Gold medal – first place	2024 Women BV Nations Cup Pool C - Madrid	Beach
Gold medal – first place	2022 CEV U22 ECH - Vlissingen	Beach
Gold medal – first place	2021 Menorca	Beach
Gold medal – first place	2021 Campello (Alicante)	Beach
Gold medal – first place	2017 CEV Youth Continental Cup - Pool H	Beach
Silver medal – second place	2023 CEV European Championships - Vienna	Beach
Silver medal – second place	2023 BPT Challenge Nuvali	Beach
Silver medal – second place	2022 2022 FISU Championships - Maceio, Brazil	Beach
Silver medal – second place	2021 CEV U20 ECH - Izmir	Beach
Silver medal – second place	2019 CEV U18 ECH - Baden	Beach
Silver medal – second place	2019 Melilla	Beach
Silver medal – second place	2019 Laredo	Beach
Silver medal – second place	2019 Ayamonte	Beach
Bronze medal – third place	2024 BPT Challenge Xiamen	Beach
Bronze medal – third place	2023 BPT Challenge Goa	Beach
Bronze medal – third place	2022 Balıkesir	Beach
Bronze medal – third place	2021 Madrid	Beach
Bronze medal – third place	2021 Fuengirola (Malaga)	Beach
Bronze medal – third place	2021 San Javier (Murcia)	Beach
Bronze medal – third place	2019 CEV U20 ECH - Göteborg	Beach
Bronze medal – third place	2018 CEV Youth Continental Cup Final - Baden	Beach
Bronze medal – third place	2018 Nanjing	Beach
Bronze medal – third place	2018 Melilla	Beach
Bronze medal – third place	2018 Laredo	Beach
Bronze medal – third place	2017 LAREDO	Beach
Bronze medal – third place	2017 FUENGIROLA	Beach
NCAA Beach Volleyball
Gold medal – first place	2025 NCAA Beach Volleyball Championship	Beach
Bronze medal – third place	2023 NCAA Beach Volleyball Championship	Beach
European Championships
Silver medal – second place	2026 Stare Jabłonki	Beach

Tania Moreno Matveeva (born 29 January 2002) is a Spanish beach volleyball player. She played with Daniela Álvarez Mendoza at the 2024 Summer Olympics in Paris. She currently attends Texas Christian University where she is part of the TCU beach volleyball team.

== Early life ==
Moreno grew up in Madrid, Spain. She grew up attending the beach volleyball matches of her mother, Olga Matveeva. Her father, Juan Manuel Moreno, was her mother's coach. Moreno began playing the sport the moment she could pick up a ball. When she was a teenager, Moreno and her mother even had the opportunity to play together as a pair.

== College ==
Moreno plays beach volleyball at Texas Christian University. She has played in all three seasons (2021, 2022, & 2023), and has one more year of NCAA eligibility.

=== Junior season (2023) ===
Moreno went 34-1 on the 2023 season. Before the 2023 season began, she was awarded CCSA Preseason All-Conference team. Along with partner Daniela Alvarez, she was awarded AVCA First-Team All American, AVCA Top Flight, and unanimously voted AVCA’s Pair of the Year. Throughout the season, the duo was awarded CCSA pair of the week three times (8 March 15 March, 29 March). In and out of the classroom she succeeded and was selected for College Sport Communicator’s 2023 Academic All-District Women’s at Large Team, additionally hitting her 75th win career milestone.

=== Sophomore season (2022) ===
Before the 2022 season began, Moreno was awarded preseason CCSA All-Conference team recognition and quickly lived up to these expectations when, for the second time in her career, was awarded both CCSA and AVCA Pair of the Week honors after season debut ( 26–27 February). She played every match at the No. 1 position primarily with Team Spain partner, Daniela Alvarez. The duo racked up 23 victories on the regular season with 11 over ranked opponents. The pairing took notable victories over No. 1 UCLA, No. 4 Florida State, No. 4 LSU, No. 8 Cal Poly and No. 9 Hawaii, finished the season 28-6 as a pairing with 14 of those victories over ranked opponents, received the AVCA Top Flight award proving they are one of the top pairing in the country, first in program history to be awarded CCSA Pair of the Year with partner Alvarez awarded All-CCSA Conference team honors, and first team AVCA All-American.

=== Freshman season (2021) ===
Moreno went 26-7 this season. She was awarded All-CCSA 1st Team and All-CCSA Freshman team honors. Within her first week as collegiate athlete, she was awarded AVCA Pair of the Week (27–28 February). Moreno and Alvarez were the first Horned Frog pairing to ever receive AVCA Pair of the Week, set first-year records in total wins, ranked wins, and program record for most wins by a No.1 pair with partner Alvarez. The duo went 26-9 on the season and collected 11 victories from ranked opponents.

== Awards ==
- CCSA Preseason All-Conference Team - 2023
- 75th Career Win Milestone - 2023
- AVCA First-Team All-American - 2023
- AVCA Top Flight - 2023
- AVCA Pair of the Year - 2023
- College Sport Communicator’s 2023 Academic All-District Women’s at Large Team - 2023
- AVCA 1st Team All-American - 2022
- CCSA Pair of the Year - 2022
- CCSA All-Conference Team - 2022
- AVCA Topflight Award, No. 1 - 2022
- AVCA 1st Team All-American - 2021
- All-CCSA 1st Team - 2021
- All-CCSA Freshman Team - 2021
- AVCA Topflight Award, No. 1 - 2021
