= Marie-Sára Štochlová =

Czech beach volleyball player

Marie-Sára Berčík

Personal information
- Nickname: Máří
- Nationality: Czech
- Born: 11 March 1999 (age 27)
- Height: 182 cm (6 ft 0 in)

Beach volleyball information

Current teammate
Teammate
Markéta Svozilová

Marie-Sára Berčík (born Štochlová) (Czech pronunciation: [ˈmarɪjɛ ˈsaːra ˈʃtoxlovaː]; born 11 March 1999) is a Czech beach volleyball player. She played with Barbora Hermannová for the Czech Republic at the 2024 Summer Olympics in Paris. Current partner Makréta Svozilová. On September 12, 2026, she married volleyball player Václav Berčík, taking his last name.
