= 2025 Beach Volleyball World Championships – Men's tournament =

Tournament details
- Host country: Australia
- City: Adelaide
- Dates: 14–23 November
- Teams: 48 (from 5 confederations)
- Venue: 1

Final positions
- Champions: Sweden; David Åhman; Jonatan Hellvig (1st title)
- Runners-up: Sweden; Jacob Nilsson; Elmer Andersson
- Third place: France; Téo Rotar; Arnaud Gauthier-Rat
- Fourth place: Germany; Nils Ehlers; Clemens Wickler

The men's tournament of the 2025 Beach Volleyball World Championships was held from 14 to 23 November 2025.

== Schedule ==
The 48 teams were split into twelve pools, where the first two and the four best-third placed teams advanced to the knockout stage. The remaining eight third-ranked teams played in a lucky loser round to determine the last four teams. After that, a knockout system was used.

P	Preliminary round	LL	Lucky losers playoffs	1/16	Round of 32	1/8	Round of 16	¼	Quarter-finals	1/2	Semi-finals	B	Bronze medal match	F	Final

Fri 14	Sat 15	Sun 16	Mon 17	Tue 18		Wed 19	Thu 20	Fri 21	Sat 22	Sun 23	
P	P	P	P	LL	1/16	1/16	1/8	1/4	1/2	B	F

== Preliminary round ==
The draw was held on 9 October 2025. If two teams are tied in points, the overall set and points ratio will be used. If three teams are tied on points, the matches against those teams determine the ranking.

All times are local (UTC+10:30).

=== Pool A ===
Pos	Team	Pld	W	L	Pts	SW	SL	SR	SPW	SPL	SPR	Qualification
1	(Norway) A. Mol – Sørum	3	3	0	6	6	1	6.000	144	121	1.190	Round of 32
2	(Switzerland) Krattiger – Dillier	3	2	1	5	5	2	2.500	139	121	1.149	Round of 32
3	(Switzerland) Heidrich – Jordan	3	1	2	4	2	4	0.500	114	116	0.983	lucky loser
4	(Uruguay) Hannibal – Llambías	3	0	3	3	0	6	0.000	87	126	0.690	

Source: FIVB

14 November 2025; 09:00	A. Mol – Sørum (Norway)	2–0	(Uruguay) Hannibal – Llambías	Court 2 Referees: Milan Vachutka (CZE), Giseli Amantin (BRA)
14 November 2025; 09:00	(21–17, 21–16); Report			Court 2 Referees: Milan Vachutka (CZE), Giseli Amantin (BRA)

14 November 2025; 09:00	Krattiger – Dillier (Switzerland)	2–0	(Switzerland) Heidrich – Jordan	Court 3 Referees: Brian Hiebert (CAN), Rui Carvalho (POR)
14 November 2025; 09:00	(21–18, 22–20); Report			Court 3 Referees: Brian Hiebert (CAN), Rui Carvalho (POR)

15 November 2025; 09:00	A. Mol – Sørum (Norway)	2–0	(Switzerland) Heidrich – Jordan	Central court Referees: Brian Hiebert (CAN), Wang Lijun (CHN)
15 November 2025; 09:00	(21–18, 21–16); Report			Central court Referees: Brian Hiebert (CAN), Wang Lijun (CHN)

15 November 2025; 11:00	Krattiger – Dillier (Switzerland)	2–0	(Uruguay) Hannibal – Llambías	Court 3 Referees: Giuseppe Curto (ITA), Juan Carlos Saavedra (COL)
15 November 2025; 11:00	(21–10, 21–13); Report			Court 3 Referees: Giuseppe Curto (ITA), Juan Carlos Saavedra (COL)

16 November 2025; 09:00	Heidrich – Jordan (Switzerland)	2–0	(Uruguay) Hannibal – Llambías	Court 3 Referees: Giseli Amantino (BRA), Giuseppe Curto (ITA)
16 November 2025; 09:00	(21–16, 21–15); Report			Court 3 Referees: Giseli Amantino (BRA), Giuseppe Curto (ITA)

16 November 2025; 11:00	A. Mol – Sørum (Norway)	2–1	(Switzerland) Krattiger – Dillier	Central court Referees: Juan Carlos Saavedra (COL), José María Padron (ESP)
16 November 2025; 11:00	(24–26, 21–16, 15–12); Report			Central court Referees: Juan Carlos Saavedra (COL), José María Padron (ESP)

=== Pool B ===
Pos	Team	Pld	W	L	Pts	SW	SL	SR	SPW	SPL	SPR	Qualification
1	(Norway) H. Mol – Berntsen	3	3	0	6	6	0	MAX	130	110	1.182	Round of 32
2	(Netherlands) Boermans – De Groot	3	2	1	5	4	2	2.000	121	98	1.235	Round of 32
3	(Norway) M. Mol – A. Mol	3	1	2	4	2	5	0.400	128	141	0.908	lucky loser
4	(Australia) Ryan – Schubert	3	0	3	3	1	6	0.167	111	141	0.787	

Source: FIVB

14 November 2025; 10:00	H. Mol – Berntsen (Norway)	2–0	(Norway) M. Mol – A. Mol	Court 3 Referees: Wang Lijun (CHN), Charalampos Papadogoulas (GRE)
14 November 2025; 10:00	(24–22, 21–15); Report			Court 3 Referees: Wang Lijun (CHN), Charalampos Papadogoulas (GRE)

14 November 2025; 12:00	Boermans – De Groot (Netherlands)	2–0	(Australia) Ryan – Schubert	Central court Referees: Osvaldo Sumavil (ARG), Suzanne Lowry (USA)
14 November 2025; 12:00	(21–11, 21–10); Report			Central court Referees: Osvaldo Sumavil (ARG), Suzanne Lowry (USA)

16 November 2025; 18:00	Boermans – De Groot (Netherlands)	2–0	(Norway) M. Mol – A. Mol	Court 2 Referees: Milan Vachutka (CZE), Brian Hiebert (CAN)
16 November 2025; 18:00	(21–18, 21–17); Report			Court 2 Referees: Milan Vachutka (CZE), Brian Hiebert (CAN)

16 November 2025; 22:00	H. Mol – Berntsen (Norway)	2–0	(Australia) Ryan – Schubert	Central court Referees: Giovanni Bake (RSA), Juan Carlos Saavedra (COL)
16 November 2025; 22:00	(21–16, 22–20); Report			Central court Referees: Giovanni Bake (RSA), Juan Carlos Saavedra (COL)

17 November 2025; 20:30	Boermans – De Groot (Netherlands)	0–2	(Norway) H. Mol – Berntsen	Court 3
17 November 2025; 20:30	(18–21, 19–21); Report			Court 3

17 November 2025; 22:00	M. Mol – A. Mol (Norway)	2–1	(Australia) Ryan – Schubert	Central court Referees: Agnieszka Myszkowska (POL), Osvaldo Sumavil (ARG)
17 November 2025; 22:00	(19–21, 22–20, 15–13); Report			Central court Referees: Agnieszka Myszkowska (POL), Osvaldo Sumavil (ARG)

=== Pool C ===
Pos	Team	Pld	W	L	Pts	SW	SL	SR	SPW	SPL	SPR	Qualification
1	(Brazil) André – Renato	3	2	1	5	4	3	1.333	132	128	1.031	Round of 32
2	(Brazil) George – Saymon	3	2	1	5	5	3	1.667	144	141	1.021	Round of 32
3	(Sweden) Åhman – Hellvig	3	1	2	4	3	4	0.750	133	116	1.147	Round of 32
4	(Australia) Burnett – Hodges	3	1	2	4	3	5	0.600	123	148	0.831	

Source: FIVB

14 November 2025; 21:00	Åhman – Hellvig (Sweden)	2–0	(Australia) Burnett – Hodges	Central court Referees: Osvaldo Sumavil (ARG), Suzanne Lowry (USA)
14 November 2025; 21:00	(21–8, 21–15); Report			Central court Referees: Osvaldo Sumavil (ARG), Suzanne Lowry (USA)

14 November 2025; 21:30	George – Saymon (Brazil)	2–0	(Brazil) André – Renato	Court 3 Referees: Wang Lijun (CHN), Charalampos Papadogoulas (GRE)
14 November 2025; 21:30	(21–17, 21–19); Report			Court 3 Referees: Wang Lijun (CHN), Charalampos Papadogoulas (GRE)

15 November 2025; 14:00	George – Saymon (Brazil)	1–2	(Australia) Burnett – Hodges	Court 2 Referees: Osvaldo Sumavil (ARG), Charalampos Papadogoulas (GRE)
15 November 2025; 14:00	(17–21, 21–14, 13–15); Report			Court 2 Referees: Osvaldo Sumavil (ARG), Charalampos Papadogoulas (GRE)

15 November 2025; 16:00	Åhman – Hellvig (Sweden)	0–2	(Brazil) André – Renato	Central court Referees: Brian Hiebert (CAN), Wang Lijun (CHN)
15 November 2025; 16:00	(17–21, 19–21); Report			Central court Referees: Brian Hiebert (CAN), Wang Lijun (CHN)

16 November 2025; 17:00	André – Renato (Brazil)	2–1	(Australia) Burnett – Hodges	Central court Referees: Charalampos Papadogoulas (GRE), Tim Cleaver (NZL)
16 November 2025; 17:00	(18–21, 21–19, 15–10); Report			Central court Referees: Charalampos Papadogoulas (GRE), Tim Cleaver (NZL)

16 November 2025; 21:30	Åhman – Hellvig (Sweden)	1–2	(Brazil) George – Saymon	Court 2 Referees: Brian Hiebert (CAN), Suzanne Lowry (USA)
16 November 2025; 21:30	(22–24, 21–12, 12–15); Report			Court 2 Referees: Brian Hiebert (CAN), Suzanne Lowry (USA)

=== Pool D ===
Pos	Team	Pld	W	L	Pts	SW	SL	SR	SPW	SPL	SPR	Qualification
1	(Brazil) Oliveira – Lanci	3	3	0	6	6	1	6.000	139	101	1.376	Round of 32
2	(Germany) Henning – Wüst	3	2	1	5	5	3	1.667	158	147	1.075	Round of 32
3	(Argentina) Amieva – Bueno	3	1	2	4	3	4	0.750	137	136	1.007	Round of 32
4	(Nicaragua) Mora – López	3	0	3	3	0	6	0.000	76	126	0.603	

Source: FIVB

14 November 2025; 13:00	Oliveira – Lanci (Brazil)	2–0	(Nicaragua) Mora – López	Court 2 Referees: Agnieszka Myszkowska (POL), Juan Carlos Saavedra (COL)
14 November 2025; 13:00	(21–12, 21–10); Report			Court 2 Referees: Agnieszka Myszkowska (POL), Juan Carlos Saavedra (COL)

14 November 2025; 14:00	Henning – Wüst (Germany)	2–1	(Argentina) Amieva – Bueno	Court 2 Referees: Milan Vachutka (CZE), Giseli Amantino (BRA)
14 November 2025; 14:00	(15–21, 31–29, 19–17); Report			Court 2 Referees: Milan Vachutka (CZE), Giseli Amantino (BRA)

15 November 2025; 17:00	Oliveira – Lanci (Brazil)	2–0	(Argentina) Amieva – Bueno	Court 2 Referees: Charalampos Papadogoulas (GRE), José María Padron (ESP)
15 November 2025; 17:00	(21–14, 21–14); Report			Court 2 Referees: Charalampos Papadogoulas (GRE), José María Padron (ESP)

15 November 2025; 21:00	Henning – Wüst (Germany)	2–0	(Nicaragua) Mora – López	Central court Referees: Agnieszka Myszkowska (POL), Rui Carvalho (POR)
15 November 2025; 21:00	(21–11, 21–14); Report			Central court Referees: Agnieszka Myszkowska (POL), Rui Carvalho (POR)

17 November 2025; 10:00	Oliveira – Lanci (Brazil)	2–1	(Germany) Henning – Wüst	Central court Referees: Rui Carvalho (POR), Giovanni Bake (RSA)
17 November 2025; 10:00	(21–17, 19–21, 15–13); Report			Central court Referees: Rui Carvalho (POR), Giovanni Bake (RSA)

17 November 2025; 14:00	Amieva – Bueno (Argentina)	2–0	(Nicaragua) Mora – López	Court 2 Referees: José María Padron (ESP), Charalampos Papadogoulas (GRE)
17 November 2025; 14:00	(21–15, 21–14); Report			Court 2 Referees: José María Padron (ESP), Charalampos Papadogoulas (GRE)

=== Pool E ===
Pos	Team	Pld	W	L	Pts	SW	SL	SR	SPW	SPL	SPR	Qualification
1	(Poland) Bryl – Łosiak	3	3	0	6	6	1	6.000	139	114	1.219	Round of 32
2	(Germany) Pfretzschner – Winter	3	2	1	5	4	2	2.000	121	110	1.100	Round of 32
3	(Austria) Dressler – Waller	3	1	2	4	3	4	0.750	127	127	1.000	lucky loser
4	(China) Wang – Du	3	0	3	3	0	6	0.000	90	126	0.714	

Source: FIVB

14 November 2025; 15:00	Bryl – Łosiak (Poland)	2–0	(China) Wang – Du	Central court Referees: Brian Hiebert (CAN), Rui Carvalho (POR)
14 November 2025; 15:00	(21–11, 21–19); Report			Central court Referees: Brian Hiebert (CAN), Rui Carvalho (POR)

14 November 2025; 15:00	Pfretzschner – Winter (Germany)	2–0	(Austria) Dressler – Waller	Court 3 Referees: Giuseppe Curto (ITA), Osvaldo Sumavil (ARG)
14 November 2025; 15:00	(21–19, 21–19); Report			Court 3 Referees: Giuseppe Curto (ITA), Osvaldo Sumavil (ARG)

16 November 2025; 09:00	Pfretzschner – Winter (Germany)	2–0	(China) Wang – Du	Central court Referees: Suzanne Lowry (USA), Osvaldo Sumavil (ARG)
16 November 2025; 09:00	(21–14, 21–16); Report			Central court Referees: Suzanne Lowry (USA), Osvaldo Sumavil (ARG)

16 November 2025; 16:00	Bryl – Łosiak (Poland)	2–1	(Austria) Dressler – Waller	Court 3 Referees: José María Padron (ESP), Giovanni Bake (RSA)
16 November 2025; 16:00	(19–21, 21–17, 15–9); Report			Court 3 Referees: José María Padron (ESP), Giovanni Bake (RSA)

17 November 2025; 16:00	Dressler – Waller (Austria)	2–0	(China) Wang – Du	Court 2 Referees: Suzanne Lowry (USA), José María Padron (ESP)
17 November 2025; 16:00	(21–15, 21–15); Report			Court 2 Referees: Suzanne Lowry (USA), José María Padron (ESP)

17 November 2025; 17:00	Bryl – Łosiak (Poland)	2–0	(Germany) Pfretzschner – Winter	Court 2 Referees: Charalampos Papadogoulas (GRE), Brian Hiebert (CAN)
17 November 2025; 17:00	(21–18, 21–19); Report			Court 2 Referees: Charalampos Papadogoulas (GRE), Brian Hiebert (CAN)

=== Pool F ===
Pos	Team	Pld	W	L	Pts	SW	SL	SR	SPW	SPL	SPR	Qualification
1	(Cuba) Díaz – Alayo	3	3	0	6	6	1	6.000	137	91	1.505	Round of 32
2	(Portugal) Pedrosa – Campos	3	2	1	5	5	3	1.667	149	143	1.042	Round of 32
3	(New Zealand) Fuller – O'Dea	3	1	2	4	2	4	0.500	108	109	0.991	lucky loser
4	(Benin) Yacoubou – Tohouegnon	3	0	3	3	1	6	0.167	89	140	0.636	

Source: FIVB

14 November 2025; 10:00	Díaz – Alayo (Cuba)	2–0	(Benin) Yacoubou – Tohouegnon	Court 2 Referees: Giovanni Bake (RSA), Agnieszka Myszkowska (POL)
14 November 2025; 10:00	(21–11, 21–6); Report			Court 2 Referees: Giovanni Bake (RSA), Agnieszka Myszkowska (POL)

14 November 2025; 11:00	Pedrosa – Campos (Portugal)	2–0	(New Zealand) Fuller – O'Dea	Court 2 Referees: Juan Carlos Saavedra (COL), Milan Vachutka (CZE)
14 November 2025; 11:00	(24–22, 21–18); Report			Court 2 Referees: Juan Carlos Saavedra (COL), Milan Vachutka (CZE)

16 November 2025; 14:00	Díaz – Alayo (Cuba)	2–0	(New Zealand) Fuller – O'Dea	Central court Referees: Giovanni Bake (RSA), Juan Carlos Saavedra (COL)
16 November 2025; 14:00	(21–16, 21–10); Report			Central court Referees: Giovanni Bake (RSA), Juan Carlos Saavedra (COL)

16 November 2025; 14:00	Pedrosa – Campos (Portugal)	2–1	(Benin) Yacoubou – Tohouegnon	Court 3 Referees: Agnieszka Myszkowska (POL), Vincent Roche (FRA)
16 November 2025; 14:00	(21–19, 20–22, 15–9); Report			Court 3 Referees: Agnieszka Myszkowska (POL), Vincent Roche (FRA)

17 November 2025; 09:00	Fuller – O'Dea (New Zealand)	2–0	(Benin) Yacoubou – Tohouegnon	Central court Referees: Wang Lijun (CHN), Agnieszka Myszkowska (POL)
17 November 2025; 09:00	(21–10, 21–12); Report			Central court Referees: Wang Lijun (CHN), Agnieszka Myszkowska (POL)

17 November 2025; 13:00	Díaz – Alayo (Cuba)	2–1	(Portugal) Pedrosa – Campos	Court 2 Referees: Giseli Amantino (BRA), Suzanne Lowry (USA)
17 November 2025; 13:00	(17–21, 21–15, 15–12); Report			Court 2 Referees: Giseli Amantino (BRA), Suzanne Lowry (USA)

=== Pool G ===
Pos	Team	Pld	W	L	Pts	SW	SL	SR	SPW	SPL	SPR	Qualification
1	(France) Rotar – Gauthier-Rat	3	3	0	6	6	3	2.000	158	148	1.068	Round of 32
2	(Sweden) Nilsson – Andersson	3	2	1	5	5	2	2.500	134	98	1.367	Round of 32
3	(England) Ja. Bello – Jo. Bello	3	1	2	4	3	5	0.600	127	147	0.864	lucky loser
4	(Australia) Hood – Merritt	3	0	3	3	2	6	0.333	128	154	0.831	

Source: FIVB

14 November 2025; 14:00	Rotar – Gauthier-Rat (France)	2–1	(England) Ja. Bello – Jo. Bello	Court 3 Referees: Charalampos Papadogoulas (GRE), Tim Cleaver (NZL)
14 November 2025; 14:00	(17–21, 21–15, 15–9); Report			Court 3 Referees: Charalampos Papadogoulas (GRE), Tim Cleaver (NZL)

14 November 2025; 16:00	Nilsson – Andersson (Sweden)	2–0	(Australia) Hood – Merritt	Central court Referees: José María Padron (ESP), Vincent Roche (FRA)
14 November 2025; 16:00	(21–15, 21–8); Report			Central court Referees: José María Padron (ESP), Vincent Roche (FRA)

15 November 2025; 10:00	Rotar – Gauthier-Rat (France)	2–1	(Australia) Hood – Merritt	Central court Referees: Rui Carvalho (POR), Giseli Amantino (BRA)
15 November 2025; 10:00	(21–18, 21–23, 15–12); Report			Central court Referees: Rui Carvalho (POR), Giseli Amantino (BRA)

15 November 2025; 11:00	Nilsson – Andersson (Sweden)	2–0	(England) Ja. Bello – Jo. Bello	Court 2 Referees: Charalampos Papadogoulas (GRE), José María Padron (ESP)
15 November 2025; 11:00	(21–14, 21–13); Report			Court 2 Referees: Charalampos Papadogoulas (GRE), José María Padron (ESP)

17 November 2025; 18:00	Ja. Bello – Jo. Bello (England)	2–1	(Australia) Hood – Merritt	Court 2 Referees: Giseli Amantino (BRA), Suzanne Lowry (USA)
17 November 2025; 18:00	(18–21, 21–17, 16–14); Report			Court 2 Referees: Giseli Amantino (BRA), Suzanne Lowry (USA)

17 November 2025; 20:30	Nilsson – Andersson (Sweden)	1–2	(France) Rotar – Gauthier-Rat	Court 2 Referees: Brian Hiebert (CAN), Giseli Amantino (BRA)
17 November 2025; 20:30	(16–21, 21–12, 13–15); Report			Court 2 Referees: Brian Hiebert (CAN), Giseli Amantino (BRA)

=== Pool H ===
Pos	Team	Pld	W	L	Pts	SW	SL	SR	SPW	SPL	SPR	Qualification
1	(Czech Republic) Perušič – Schweiner	3	3	0	6	6	1	6.000	138	94	1.468	Round of 32
2	(Latvia) Pļaviņš – Fokerots	3	2	1	5	4	2	2.000	116	103	1.126	Round of 32
3	(United States) Partain – Benesh	3	1	2	4	3	4	0.750	126	118	1.068	Round of 32
4	(Togo) Kotoka – Samani	3	0	3	3	0	6	0.000	61	126	0.484	

Source: FIVB

15 November 2025; 12:00	Perušič – Schweiner (Czech Republic)	2–0	(Togo) Kotoka – Samani	Court 3 Referees: Giovanni Bake (RSA), Carlos Rivera (PUR)
15 November 2025; 12:00	(21–5, 21–11); Report			Court 3 Referees: Giovanni Bake (RSA), Carlos Rivera (PUR)

15 November 2025; 12:00	Pļaviņš – Fokerots (Latvia)	2–0	(United States) Partain – Benesh	Court 2 Referees: Vincent Roche (FRA), Tim Cleaver (NZL)
15 November 2025; 12:00	(22–20, 21–17); Report			Court 2 Referees: Vincent Roche (FRA), Tim Cleaver (NZL)

16 November 2025; 10:00	Perušič – Schweiner (Czech Republic)	2–1	(United States) Partain – Benesh	Central court Referees: Wang Lijun (CHN), Agnieszka Myszkowska (POL)
16 November 2025; 10:00	(18–21, 21–17, 15–9); Report			Central court Referees: Wang Lijun (CHN), Agnieszka Myszkowska (POL)

16 November 2025; 10:00	Pļaviņš – Fokerots (Latvia)	2–0	(Togo) Kotoka – Samani	Court 3 Referees: Charalampos Papadogoulas (GRE), Tim Cleaver (NZL)
16 November 2025; 10:00	(21–13, 21–11); Report			Court 3 Referees: Charalampos Papadogoulas (GRE), Tim Cleaver (NZL)

17 November 2025; 12:00	Perušič – Schweiner (Czech Republic)	2–0	(Latvia) Pļaviņš – Fokerots	Court 2 Referees: Charalampos Papadogoulas (GRE), Brian Hiebert (CAN)
17 November 2025; 12:00	(21–19, 21–12); Report			Court 2 Referees: Charalampos Papadogoulas (GRE), Brian Hiebert (CAN)

17 November 2025; 12:00	Partain – Benesh (United States)	2–0	(Togo) Kotoka – Samani	Court 3 Referees: Juan Carlos Saavedra (COL), Tim Cleaver (NZL)
17 November 2025; 12:00	(21–9, 21–12); Report			Court 3 Referees: Juan Carlos Saavedra (COL), Tim Cleaver (NZL)

=== Pool I ===
Pos	Team	Pld	W	L	Pts	SW	SL	SR	SPW	SPL	SPR	Qualification
1	(United States) Evans – Budinger	3	2	1	5	5	2	2.500	133	120	1.108	Round of 32
2	(United States) Schalk – Shaw	3	2	1	5	5	3	1.667	155	146	1.062	Round of 32
3	(Netherlands) Penninga – Immers	3	1	2	4	2	5	0.400	128	128	1.000	lucky loser
4	(Australia) Potts – Pearse	3	1	2	4	3	5	0.600	131	153	0.856	

Source: FIVB

14 November 2025; 17:00	Schalk – Shaw (United States)	1–2	(Australia) Potts – Pearse	Court 3 Referees: Tim Cleaver (NZL), Brian Hiebert (CAN)
14 November 2025; 17:00	(21–16, 22–24, 15–17); Report			Court 3 Referees: Tim Cleaver (NZL), Brian Hiebert (CAN)

14 November 2025; 18:00	Evans – Budinger (United States)	2–0	(Netherlands) Penninga – Immers	Court 2 Referees: Agnieszka Myszkowska (POL), Juan Carlos Saavedra (COL)
14 November 2025; 18:00	(21–16, 21–19); Report			Court 2 Referees: Agnieszka Myszkowska (POL), Juan Carlos Saavedra (COL)

15 November 2025; 15:00	Evans – Budinger (United States)	2–0	(Australia) Potts – Pearse	Central court Referees: Giseli Amantino (BRA), Agnieszka Myszkowska (POL)
15 November 2025; 15:00	(21–16, 21–17); Report			Central court Referees: Giseli Amantino (BRA), Agnieszka Myszkowska (POL)

15 November 2025; 16:00	Schalk – Shaw (United States)	2–0	(Netherlands) Penninga – Immers	Court 3 Referees: Giuseppe Curto (ITA), Juan Carlos Saavedra (COL)
15 November 2025; 16:00	(21–18, 24–22); Report			Court 3 Referees: Giuseppe Curto (ITA), Juan Carlos Saavedra (COL)

17 November 2025; 12:00	Penninga – Immers (Netherlands)	2–1	(Australia) Potts – Pearse	Central court Referees: Milan Vachutka (CZE), Rui Carvalho (POR)
17 November 2025; 12:00	(17–21, 21–12, 15–8); Report			Central court Referees: Milan Vachutka (CZE), Rui Carvalho (POR)

17 November 2025; 16:00	Schalk – Shaw (United States)	2–1	(United States) Evans – Budinger	Court 3 Referees: Tim Cleaver (NZL), Carlos Rivera (PUR)
17 November 2025; 16:00	(16–21, 21–19, 15–9); Report			Court 3 Referees: Tim Cleaver (NZL), Carlos Rivera (PUR)

=== Pool J ===
Pos	Team	Pld	W	L	Pts	SW	SL	SR	SPW	SPL	SPR	Qualification
1	(Qatar) Cherif – Ahmed	3	3	0	6	6	0	MAX	127	94	1.351	Round of 32
2	(Switzerland) Haussener – Friedli	3	2	1	5	4	3	1.333	123	125	0.984	Round of 32
3	(Austria) Hammarberg – Berger	3	1	2	4	3	5	0.600	139	139	1.000	lucky loser
4	(Cuba) Gómez – Veranes	3	0	3	3	1	6	0.167	108	139	0.777	

Source: FIVB

15 November 2025; 17:00	Hammarberg – Berger (Austria)	1–2	(Switzerland) Haussener – Friedli	Court 3 Referees: Giovanni Bake (RSA), Carlos Rivera (PUR)
15 November 2025; 17:00	(21–15, 18–21, 13–15); Report			Court 3 Referees: Giovanni Bake (RSA), Carlos Rivera (PUR)

15 November 2025; 18:00	Cherif – Ahmed (Qatar)	2–0	(Cuba) Gómez – Veranes	Court 2 Referees: Vincent Roche (FRA), Tim Cleaver (NZL)
15 November 2025; 18:00	(21–18, 21–14); Report			Court 2 Referees: Vincent Roche (FRA), Tim Cleaver (NZL)

16 November 2025; 12:00	Cherif – Ahmed (Qatar)	2–0	(Switzerland) Haussener – Friedli	Court 2 Referees: Osvaldo Sumavil (ARG), Rui Carvalho (POR)
16 November 2025; 12:00	(21–15, 21–15); Report			Court 2 Referees: Osvaldo Sumavil (ARG), Rui Carvalho (POR)

16 November 2025; 13:00	Hammarberg – Berger (Austria)	2–1	(Cuba) Gómez – Veranes	Court 2 Referees: Milan Vachutka (CZE), Brian Hiebert (CAN)
16 November 2025; 13:00	(19–21, 21–15, 15–9); Report			Court 2 Referees: Milan Vachutka (CZE), Brian Hiebert (CAN)

17 November 2025; 11:00	Cherif – Ahmed (Qatar)	2–0	(Austria) Hammarberg – Berger	Court 2 Referees: Suzanne Lowry (USA), José María Padron (ESP)
17 November 2025; 11:00	(22–20, 21–12); Report			Court 2 Referees: Suzanne Lowry (USA), José María Padron (ESP)

17 November 2025; 11:00	Haussener – Friedli (Switzerland)	2–0	(Cuba) Gómez – Veranes	Court 3 Referees: Giuseppe Curto (ITA), Vincent Roche (FRA)
17 November 2025; 11:00	(21–13, 21–18); Report			Court 3 Referees: Giuseppe Curto (ITA), Vincent Roche (FRA)

=== Pool K ===
Pos	Team	Pld	W	L	Pts	SW	SL	SR	SPW	SPL	SPR	Qualification
1	(Argentina) T. Capogrosso – N. Capogrosso	3	3	0	6	6	1	6.000	139	107	1.299	Round of 32
2	(Germany) Ehlers – Wickler	3	2	1	5	4	2	2.000	120	95	1.263	Round of 32
3	(Canada) Schachter – Pickett	3	1	2	4	3	4	0.750	123	127	0.969	lucky loser
4	(Mozambique) Mondlane – Mungoi	3	0	3	3	0	6	0.000	72	126	0.571	

Source: FIVB

15 November 2025; 20:30	Ehlers – Wickler (Germany)	2–0	(Canada) Schachter – Pickett	Court 2 Referees: José María Padron (ESP), Vincent Roche (FRA)
15 November 2025; 20:30	(21–16, 21–18); Report			Court 2 Referees: José María Padron (ESP), Vincent Roche (FRA)

15 November 2025; 21:30	T. Capogrosso – N. Capogrosso (Argentina)	2–0	(Mozambique) Mondlane – Mungoi	Court 3 Referees: Giuseppe Curto (ITA), Juan Carlos Saavedra (COL)
15 November 2025; 21:30	(21–6, 21–17); Report			Court 3 Referees: Giuseppe Curto (ITA), Juan Carlos Saavedra (COL)

16 November 2025; 15:00	T. Capogrosso – N. Capogrosso (Argentina)	2–1	(Canada) Schachter – Pickett	Court 2 Referees: Rui Carvalho (POR), Milan Vachutka (CZE)
16 November 2025; 15:00	(19–21, 21–17, 15–9); Report			Court 2 Referees: Rui Carvalho (POR), Milan Vachutka (CZE)

16 November 2025; 15:00	Ehlers – Wickler (Germany)	2–0	(Mozambique) Mondlane – Mungoi	Court 3 Referees: Giseli Amantino (BRA), Giuseppe Curto (ITA)
16 November 2025; 15:00	(21–11, 21–8); Report			Court 3 Referees: Giseli Amantino (BRA), Giuseppe Curto (ITA)

17 November 2025; 17:00	Schachter – Pickett (Canada)	2–0	(Mozambique) Mondlane – Mungoi	Court 3 Referees: Giuseppe Curto (ITA), Vincent Roche (FRA)
17 November 2025; 17:00	(21–14, 21–16); Report			Court 3 Referees: Giuseppe Curto (ITA), Vincent Roche (FRA)

17 November 2025; 18:00	T. Capogrosso – N. Capogrosso (Argentina)	2–0	(Germany) Ehlers – Wickler	Court 3 Referees: Juan Carlos Saavedra (COL), Tim Cleaver (NZL)
17 November 2025; 18:00	(21–18, 21–18); Report			Court 3 Referees: Juan Carlos Saavedra (COL), Tim Cleaver (NZL)

=== Pool L ===
Pos	Team	Pld	W	L	Pts	SW	SL	SR	SPW	SPL	SPR	Qualification
1	(France) Bassereau – Aye	3	2	1	5	4	3	1.333	137	118	1.161	Round of 32
2	(Australia) Nicolaidis – Carracher	3	2	1	5	5	2	2.500	140	119	1.176	Round of 32
3	(Chile) M. Grimalt – E. Grimalt	3	2	1	5	5	3	1.667	145	128	1.133	Round of 32
4	(Morocco) Ilyas – El Gharouti	3	0	3	3	0	6	0.000	69	126	0.548	

Source: FIVB

14 November 2025; 21:30	Bassereau – Aye (France)	2–1	(Chile) M. Grimalt – E. Grimalt	Court 2 Referees: Juan Carlos Saavedra (COL), Milan Vachutka (CZE)
14 November 2025; 21:30	(21–15, 18–21, 15–12); Report			Court 2 Referees: Juan Carlos Saavedra (COL), Milan Vachutka (CZE)

14 November 2025; 22:00	Nicolaidis – Carracher (Australia)	2–0	(Morocco) Ilyas – El Gharouti	Central court Referees: Vincent Roche (FRA), Carlos Rivera (PUR)
14 November 2025; 22:00	(21–11, 21–12); Report			Central court Referees: Vincent Roche (FRA), Carlos Rivera (PUR)

15 November 2025; 20:00	Nicolaidis – Carracher (Australia)	1–2	(Chile) M. Grimalt – E. Grimalt	Central court Referees: Milan Vachutka (CZE), Brian Hiebert (CAN)
15 November 2025; 20:00	(19–21, 21–19, 13–15); Report			Central court Referees: Milan Vachutka (CZE), Brian Hiebert (CAN)

15 November 2025; 21:30	Bassereau – Aye (France)	2–0	(Morocco) Ilyas – El Gharouti	Court 2 Referees: Tim Cleaver (NZL), Osvaldo Sumavil (ARG)
15 November 2025; 21:30	(21–14, 21–11); Report			Court 2 Referees: Tim Cleaver (NZL), Osvaldo Sumavil (ARG)

16 November 2025; 21:00	Nicolaidis – Carracher (Australia)	2–0	(France) Bassereau – Aye	Central court Referees: Carlos Rivera (PUR), Charalampos Papadogoulas (GRE)
16 November 2025; 21:00	(21–19,24–22); Report			Central court Referees: Carlos Rivera (PUR), Charalampos Papadogoulas (GRE)

16 November 2025; 21:30	M. Grimalt – E. Grimalt (Chile)	2–0	(Morocco) Ilyas – El Gharouti	Court 3 Referees: Wang Lijun (CHN), Agnieszka Myszkowska (POL)
16 November 2025; 21:30	(21–10, 21–11); Report			Court 3 Referees: Wang Lijun (CHN), Agnieszka Myszkowska (POL)

=== Ranking of third-placed teams ===
Pos	Grp	Team	Pld	W	L	Pts	SW	SL	SR	SPW	SPL	SPR	Qualification
1	L	(Chile) M. Grimalt – E. Grimalt	3	2	1	5	5	3	1.667	145	128	1.133	Round of 32
2	C	(Sweden) Åhman – Hellvig	3	1	2	4	3	4	0.750	133	116	1.147	Round of 32
3	H	(United States) Partain – Benesh	3	1	2	4	3	4	0.750	126	118	1.068	Round of 32
4	D	(Argentina) Amieva – Bueno	3	1	2	4	3	4	0.750	137	136	1.007	Round of 32
5	E	(Austria) Dressler – Waller	3	1	2	4	3	4	0.750	127	127	1.000	Lucky losers playoffs
6	K	(Canada) Schachter – Pickett	3	1	2	4	3	4	0.750	123	127	0.969	Lucky losers playoffs
7	J	(Austria) Hammarberg – Berger	3	1	2	4	3	5	0.600	139	139	1.000	Lucky losers playoffs
8	G	(England) Ja. Bello – Jo. Bello	3	1	2	4	3	5	0.600	127	147	0.864	Lucky losers playoffs
9	F	(New Zealand) Fuller – O'Dea	3	1	2	4	2	4	0.500	108	109	0.991	Lucky losers playoffs
10	A	(Switzerland) Heidrich – Jordan	3	1	2	4	2	4	0.500	114	116	0.983	Lucky losers playoffs
11	I	(Netherlands) Penninga – Immers	3	1	2	4	2	5	0.400	128	128	1.000	Lucky losers playoffs
12	B	(Norway) M. Mol – A. Mol	3	1	2	4	2	5	0.400	128	141	0.908	Lucky losers playoffs

Source: FIVB

=== Lucky losers playoffs ===
18 November 2025; 13:30	Hammarberg – Berger (Austria)	2–0	(Switzerland) Heidrich – Jordan	Court 3 Referees: Carlos Rivera (PUR), Rui Carvalho (POR)
18 November 2025; 13:30	(21–15, 21–17); Report			Court 3 Referees: Carlos Rivera (PUR), Rui Carvalho (POR)

18 November 2025; 14:30	Dressler – Waller (Austria)	2–1	(Norway) M. Mol – A. Mol	Court 3 Referees: Osvaldo Sumavil (ARG), Vincent Roche (FRA)
18 November 2025; 14:30	(21–16, 18–21, 15–13); Report			Court 3 Referees: Osvaldo Sumavil (ARG), Vincent Roche (FRA)

18 November 2025; 14:30	Schachter – Pickett (Canada)	2–1	(Netherlands) Penninga – Immers	Court 2 Referees: Charalampos Papadogoulas (GRE), Juan Carlos Saavedra (COL)
18 November 2025; 14:30	(21–18, 19–21, 15–9); Report			Court 2 Referees: Charalampos Papadogoulas (GRE), Juan Carlos Saavedra (COL)

18 November 2025; 15:30	Ja. Bello – Jo. Bello (England)	0–2	(New Zealand) Fuller – O'Dea	Central court Referees: Brian Hiebert (CAN), Suzanne Lowry (USA)
18 November 2025; 15:30	(17–21, 20–22); Report			Central court Referees: Brian Hiebert (CAN), Suzanne Lowry (USA)

== Knockout stage ==
=== Bracket ===
Round of 32
19 November
(Norway) A. Mol – Sørum	2
(Canada) Schachter – Pickett	1
19 November
(Latvia) Pļaviņš – Fokerots	0
(Germany) Ehlers – Wickler	2
18 November
(United States) Evans – Budinger	0
(Portugal) Pedrosa – Campos	2
18 November
(Chile) M. Grimalt – E. Grimalt	1
(Czech Republic) Perušič – Schweiner	2
18 November
(Poland) Bryl – Łosiak	0
(Sweden) Åhman – Hellvig	2
18 November
(Switzerland) Haussener – Friedli	1
(France) Bassereau – Aye	2
19 November
(Switzerland) Krattiger – Dillier	2
(Netherlands) Boermans – De Groot	0
19 November
(New Zealand) Fuller – O'Dea	1
(Brazil) Evandro – Arthur	2
19 November
(Brazil) André – Renato	2
(Austria) Hammarberg – Berger	0
19 November
(Sweden) Nilsson – Andersson	2
(Germany) Henning – Wüst	0
18 November
(Argentina) T. Capogrosso – N. Capogrosso	1
(United States) Schalk – Shaw	2
18 November
(United States) Partain – Benesh	1
(Cuba) Díaz – Alayo	2
18 November
(France) Rotar – Gauthier-Rat	2
(Argentina) Amieva – Bueno	0
18 November
(Brazil) George – Saymon	0
(Qatar) Cherif – Ahmed	2
19 November
(Australia) Nicolaidis – Carracher	0
(Germany) Pfretzschner – Winter	2
19 November
(Norway) H. Mol – Berntsen	2
(Austria) Dressler – Waller	0

Round of 16
20 November
(Norway) A. Mol – Sørum	1
(Germany) Ehlers – Wickler	2
20 November
(Portugal) Pedrosa – Campos	0
(Czech Republic) Perušič – Schweiner	2
20 November
(Sweden) Åhman – Hellvig	2
(France) Bassereau – Aye	0
20 November
(Switzerland) Krattiger – Dillier	1
(Brazil) Evandro – Arthur	2
20 November
(Brazil) André – Renato	0
(Sweden) Nilsson – Andersson	2
20 November
(United States) Schalk – Shaw	2
(Cuba) Díaz – Alayo	0
20 November
(France) Rotar – Gauthier-Rat	2
(Qatar) Cherif – Ahmed	1
20 November
(Germany) Pfretzschner – Winter	2
(Norway) H. Mol – Berntsen	0

Quarter-finals
21 November
(Germany) Ehlers – Wickler	2
(Czech Republic) Perušič – Schweiner	0
21 November
(Sweden) Åhman – Hellvig	2
(Brazil) Evandro – Arthur	0
21 November
(Sweden) Nilsson – Andersson	2
(United States) Schalk – Shaw	0
21 November
(France) Rotar – Gauthier-Rat	2
(Germany) Pfretzschner – Winter	1

Semi-finals
22 November
(Germany) Ehlers – Wickler	0
(Sweden) Åhman – Hellvig	2
22 November
(Sweden) Nilsson – Andersson	2
(France) Rotar – Gauthier-Rat	0

Final
23 November
(Sweden) Åhman – Hellvig	2
(Sweden) Nilsson – Andersson	0
Third place
23 November
(Germany) Ehlers – Wickler	0
(France) Rotar – Gauthier-Rat	2

=== Round of 32 ===
18 November 2025; 16:30	Bryl – Łosiak (Poland)	0–2	(Sweden) Åhman – Hellvig	Central court Referees: Osvaldo Sumavil (ARG), Milan Vachutka (CZE)
18 November 2025; 16:30	(18–21, 18–21); Report			Central court Referees: Osvaldo Sumavil (ARG), Milan Vachutka (CZE)

18 November 2025; 17:30	Haussener – Friedli (Switzerland)	1–2	(France) Bassereau – Aye	Court 2 Referees: José María Padron (ESP), Tim Cleaver (NZL)
18 November 2025; 17:30	(11–21, 21–18, 9–15); Report			Court 2 Referees: José María Padron (ESP), Tim Cleaver (NZL)

18 November 2025; 19:00	Rotar – Gauthier-Rat (France)	2–0	(Argentina) Amieva – Bueno	Court 2 Referees: Charalampos Papadogoulas (GRE), Brian Hiebert (CAN)
18 November 2025; 19:00	(22–20, 21–12); Report			Court 2 Referees: Charalampos Papadogoulas (GRE), Brian Hiebert (CAN)

18 November 2025; 19:00	George – Saymon (Brazil)	0–2	(Qatar) Cherif – Ahmed	Central court Referees: Carlos Rivera (PUR), Milan Vachutka (CZE)
18 November 2025; 19:00	(21–23, 20–22); Report			Central court Referees: Carlos Rivera (PUR), Milan Vachutka (CZE)

18 November 2025; 20:00	Evans – Budinger (United States)	0–2	(Portugal) Pedrosa – Campos	Court 2 Referees: Giuseppe Curto (ITA), Giseli Amantino (BRA)
18 November 2025; 20:00	(16–21, 19–21); Report			Court 2 Referees: Giuseppe Curto (ITA), Giseli Amantino (BRA)

18 November 2025; 20:00	M. Grimalt – E. Grimalt (Chile)	1–2	(Czech Republic) Perušič – Schweiner	Central court Referees: Juan Carlos Saavedra (COL), José María Padron (ESP)
18 November 2025; 20:00	(14–21, 27–25, 10–15); Report			Central court Referees: Juan Carlos Saavedra (COL), José María Padron (ESP)

18 November 2025; 21:00	T. Capogrosso – N. Capogrosso (Argentina)	1–2	(United States) Schalk – Shaw	Court 3 Referees: Milan Vachutka (CZE), Agnieszka Myszkowska (POL)
18 November 2025; 21:00	(21–13, 20–22, 11–15); Report			Court 3 Referees: Milan Vachutka (CZE), Agnieszka Myszkowska (POL)

18 November 2025; 22:00	Partain – Benesh (United States)	1–2	(Cuba) Díaz – Alayo	Court 2 Referees: José María Padron (ESP), Brian Hiebert (CAN)
18 November 2025; 22:00	(18–21, 21–19, 12–15); Report			Court 2 Referees: José María Padron (ESP), Brian Hiebert (CAN)

19 November 2025; 13:30	André – Renato (Brazil)	2–0	(Austria) Hammarberg – Berger	Central court Referees: Tim Cleaver (NZL), Brian Hiebert (CAN)
19 November 2025; 13:30	(21–15, 21–14); Report			Central court Referees: Tim Cleaver (NZL), Brian Hiebert (CAN)

19 November 2025; 14:30	Evandro – Arthur (Brazil)	2–1	(New Zealand) Fuller – O'Dea	Court 2 Referees: Charalampos Papadogoulas (GRE), Carlos Rivera (PUR)
19 November 2025; 14:30	(21–15, 17–21, 25–23); Report			Court 2 Referees: Charalampos Papadogoulas (GRE), Carlos Rivera (PUR)

19 November 2025; 16:00	Pļaviņš – Fokerots (Latvia)	0–2	(Germany) Ehlers – Wickler	Court 2 Referees: Brian Hiebert (CAN), Giuseppe Curto (ITA)
19 November 2025; 16:00	(20–22, 13–21); Report			Court 2 Referees: Brian Hiebert (CAN), Giuseppe Curto (ITA)

19 November 2025; 16:30	Krattiger – Dillier (Switzerland)	2–0	(Netherlands) Boermans – De Groot	Central court Referees: José María Padron (ESP), Giseli Amantino (BRA)
19 November 2025; 16:30	(21–14, 21–19); Report			Central court Referees: José María Padron (ESP), Giseli Amantino (BRA)

19 November 2025; 19:30	A. Mol – Sørum (Norway)	2–1	(Canada) Schachter – Pickett	Court 2 Referees: Osvaldo Sumavil (ARG), José María Padron (ESP)
19 November 2025; 19:30	(18–21, 21–14, 15–11); Report			Court 2 Referees: Osvaldo Sumavil (ARG), José María Padron (ESP)

19 November 2025; 20:00	Nicolaidis – Carracher (Australia)	0–2	(Germany) Pfretzschner – Winter	Central court Referees: Suzanne Lowry (USA), Giuseppe Curto (ITA)
19 November 2025; 20:00	(15–21, 17–21); Report			Central court Referees: Suzanne Lowry (USA), Giuseppe Curto (ITA)

19 November 2025; 21:00	Nilsson – Andersson (Sweden)	2–0	(Germany) Henning – Wüst	Central court Referees: Milan Vachutka (CZE), Charalampos Papadogoulas (GRE)
19 November 2025; 21:00	(23–21, 21–17); Report			Central court Referees: Milan Vachutka (CZE), Charalampos Papadogoulas (GRE)

19 November 2025; 22:00	H. Mol – Berntsen (Norway)	2–0	(Austria) Dressler – Waller	Court 2 Referees: Carlos Rivera (PUR), Wang Lijun (CHN)
19 November 2025; 22:00	(21–13, 21–18); Report			Court 2 Referees: Carlos Rivera (PUR), Wang Lijun (CHN)

=== Round of 16 ===
20 November 2025; 13:30	Pedrosa – Campos (Portugal)	0–2	(Czech Republic) Perušič – Schweiner	Court 2 Referees: Giuseppe Curto (ITA), Charalampos Papadogoulas (GRE)
20 November 2025; 13:30	(16–21, 18–21); Report			Court 2 Referees: Giuseppe Curto (ITA), Charalampos Papadogoulas (GRE)

20 November 2025; 14:30	Krattiger – Dillier (Switzerland)	1–2	(Brazil) Evandro – Arthur	Court 2 Referees: Carlos Rivera (PUR), José María Padron (ESP)
20 November 2025; 14:30	(24–22, 12–21, 13–15); Report			Court 2 Referees: Carlos Rivera (PUR), José María Padron (ESP)

20 November 2025; 15:30	Rotar – Gauthier-Rat (France)	2–1	(Qatar) Cherif – Ahmed	Central court Referees: Osvaldo Sumavil (ARG), Rui Carvalho (POR)
20 November 2025; 15:30	(15–21, 21–16, 23–21); Report			Central court Referees: Osvaldo Sumavil (ARG), Rui Carvalho (POR)

20 November 2025; 16:30	A. Mol – Sørum (Norway)	1–2	(Germany) Ehlers – Wickler	Central court Referees: Brian Hiebert (CAN), Giovanni Bake (RSA)
20 November 2025; 16:30	(21–16, 18–21, 14–16); Report			Central court Referees: Brian Hiebert (CAN), Giovanni Bake (RSA)

20 November 2025; 18:30	Schalk – Shaw (United States)	2–0	(Cuba) Díaz – Alayo	Court 2 Referees: Juan Carlos Saavedra (COL), Milan Vachutka (CZE)
20 November 2025; 18:30	(21–19, 22–20); Report			Court 2 Referees: Juan Carlos Saavedra (COL), Milan Vachutka (CZE)

20 November 2025; 19:30	André – Renato (Brazil)	0–2	(Sweden) Nilsson – Andersson	Court 2 Referees: Charalampos Papadogoulas (GRE), Tim Cleaver (NZL)
20 November 2025; 19:30	(16–21, 14–21); Report			Court 2 Referees: Charalampos Papadogoulas (GRE), Tim Cleaver (NZL)

20 November 2025; 21:20	Pfretzschner – Winter (Germany)	2–0	(Norway) H. Mol – Berntsen	Central court Referees: José María Padron (ESP), Suzanne Lowry (USA)
20 November 2025; 21:20	(25–23, 22–20); Report			Central court Referees: José María Padron (ESP), Suzanne Lowry (USA)

20 November 2025; 22:20	Åhman – Hellvig (Sweden)	2–0	(France) Bassereau – Aye	Central court Referees: Giseli Amantino (BRA), Tim Cleaver (NZL)
20 November 2025; 22:20	(21–17, 21–16); Report			Central court Referees: Giseli Amantino (BRA), Tim Cleaver (NZL)

=== Quarterfinals ===
21 November 2025; 13:30	Nilsson – Andersson (Sweden)	2–0	(United States) Schalk – Shaw	Central court Referees: Carlos Rivera (PUR), Charalampos Papadogoulas (GRE)
21 November 2025; 13:30	(21–18, 22–20); Report			Central court Referees: Carlos Rivera (PUR), Charalampos Papadogoulas (GRE)

21 November 2025; 16:30	Rotar – Gauthier-Rat (France)	2–1	(Germany) Pfretzschner – Winter	Central court Referees: Juan Carlos Saavedra (COL), Brian Hiebert (CAN)
21 November 2025; 16:30	(21–19, 17–21, 15–13); Report			Central court Referees: Juan Carlos Saavedra (COL), Brian Hiebert (CAN)

21 November 2025; 19:00	Åhman – Hellvig (Sweden)	2–0	(Brazil) Evandro – Arthur	Central court Referees: Giuseppe Curto (ITA), Carlos Rivera (PUR)
21 November 2025; 19:00	(22–20, 22–20); Report			Central court Referees: Giuseppe Curto (ITA), Carlos Rivera (PUR)

21 November 2025; 20:00	Ehlers – Wickler (Germany)	2–0	(Czech Republic) Perušič – Schweiner	Central court Referees: Osvaldo Sumavil (ARG), Suzanne Lowry (USA)
21 November 2025; 20:00	(21–18, 21–18); Report			Central court Referees: Osvaldo Sumavil (ARG), Suzanne Lowry (USA)

=== Semifinals ===
22 November 2025; 15:00	Nilsson – Andersson (Sweden)	2–0	(France) Rotar – Gauthier-Rat	Central court Referees: Brian Hiebert (CAN), Giseli Amantino (BRA)
22 November 2025; 15:00	(21–18, 21–17); Report			Central court Referees: Brian Hiebert (CAN), Giseli Amantino (BRA)

22 November 2025; 19:00	Ehlers – Wickler (Germany)	0–2	(Sweden) Åhman – Hellvig	Central court Referees: Rui Carvalho (POR), Giuseppe Curto (ITA)
22 November 2025; 19:00	(10–21, 14–21); Report			Central court Referees: Rui Carvalho (POR), Giuseppe Curto (ITA)

=== Third place game ===
23 November 2025; 15:00	Rotar – Gauthier-Rat (France)	2–0	(Germany) Ehlers – Wickler	Central court Referees: Giuseppe Curto (ITA), Carlos Rivera (PUR)
23 November 2025; 15:00	(21–15, 21–15); Report			Central court Referees: Giuseppe Curto (ITA), Carlos Rivera (PUR)

=== Final ===
23 November 2025; 19:00	Nilsson – Andersson (Sweden)	0–2	(Sweden) Åhman – Hellvig	Central court Referees: Osvaldo Sumavil (ARG), Juan Carlos Saavedra (COL)
23 November 2025; 19:00	(23–25, 19–21); Report			Central court Referees: Osvaldo Sumavil (ARG), Juan Carlos Saavedra (COL)

== Final ranking ==
Rank	Team
Gold medal	(Sweden) Åhman – Hellvig
Silver medal	(Sweden) Nilsson – Andersson
Bronze medal	(France) Rotar – Gauthier-Rat
4	(Germany) Ehlers – Wickler
5	(Czech Republic) Perušič – Schweiner
5	(Brazil) Evandro – Arthur
5	(Germany) Pfretzschner – Winter
5	(United States) Schalk – Shaw
9	(Brazil) André – Renato
9	(Cuba) Díaz – Alayo
9	(France) Bassereau – Aye
9	(Norway) A. Mol – Sørum
9	(Norway) H. Mol – Berntsen
9	(Qatar) Cherif – Ahmed
9	(Portugal) Pedrosa – Campos
9	(Switzerland) Krattiger – Dillier
17	(Argentina) Amieva – Bueno
17	(Argentina) T. Capogrosso – N. Capogrosso
17	(Australia) Nicolaidis – Carracher
17	(Austria) Dressler – Waller
17	(Austria) Hammarberg – Berger
17	(Brazil) George – Saymon
17	(Canada) Schachter – Pickett
17	(Chile) M. Grimalt – E. Grimalt
17	(Germany) Henning – Wüst
17	(Latvia) Pļaviņš – Fokerots
17	(Netherlands) Boermans – De Groot
17	(New Zealand) Fuller – O'Dea
17	(Poland) Bryl – Łosiak
17	(Switzerland) Haussener – Friedli
17	(United States) Evans – Budinger
17	(United States) Partain – Benesh
33	(England) Ja. Bello – Jo. Bello
33	(Netherlands) Penninga – Immers
33	(Norway) M. Mol – A. Mol
33	(Switzerland) Heidrich – Jordan
37	(Australia) Burnett – Hodges
37	(Australia) Hood – Merritt
37	(Australia) Potts – Pearse
37	(Australia) Ryan – Schubert
37	(Benin) Yacoubou – Tohouegnon
37	(China) Wang – Du
37	(Cuba) Gómez – Veranes
37	(Morocco) Ilyas – El Gharouti
37	(Mozambique) Mondlane – Mungoi
37	(Nicaragua) Mora – López
37	(Togo) Kotoka – Samani
37	(Uruguay) Hannibal – Llambías

== See also ==
- 2025 Beach Volleyball World Championships – Women's tournament
