= 2023 Beach Volleyball World Championships – Men's tournament =

Tournament details
- Host country: Mexico
- Cities: Tlaxcala; Apizaco; Huamantla
- Dates: 6–15 October
- Teams: 48 (from 5 confederations)
- Venues: 4

Final positions
- Champions: Czech Republic; Ondřej Perušič; David Schweiner (1st title)
- Runners-up: Sweden; David Åhman; Jonatan Hellvig
- Third place: Poland; Bartosz Łosiak; Michał Bryl
- Fourth place: United States; Trevor Crabb; Theodore Brunner

The men's tournament of the 2023 Beach Volleyball World Championships was held from 6 to 15 October 2023.

Ondřej Perušič and David Schweiner won their first tile after defeating David Åhman and Jonatan Hellvig in the final, while Bartosz Łosiak and Michał Bryl captured the bronze medal.

== Qualification ==
There were 48 teams qualified for the tournament.

== Schedule ==
The 48 teams were split into twelve pools, where the first two and the four best-third placed teams advanced to the knockout stage. The remaining eight third-ranked teams played in a lucky loser round to determine the last four teams. After that, a knockout system was used.

P	Preliminary round	LL	Lucky losers playoffs	1/16	Round of 32	1/8	Round of 16	1/4	Quarter-finals	1/2	Semi-finals	B	Bronze medal match	F	Final

Fri 6	Sat 7	Sun 8	Mon 9	Tue 10	Wed 11	Thu 12	Fri 13	Sat 14	Sun 15	
P	P	P	P	LL	1/16	1/8	1/4	1/2	B	F

== Preliminary round ==
The draw was held on 21 May 2022. If two teams were tied in points, the overall set and points ratio were used. If three teams were tied on points, the matches against those teams determined the ranking.

All times are local (UTC−6).

=== Pool A ===
Pos	Team	Pld	W	L	Pts	SW	SL	SR	SPW	SPL	SPR	Qualification
1	(Norway) A. Mol – Sørum	3	3	0	6	6	1	6.000	139	93	1.495	Round of 32
2	(Italy) Lupo – Rossi	3	2	1	5	5	3	1.667	134	138	0.971	Round of 32
3	(Netherlands) Boermans – De Groot	3	1	2	4	3	4	0.750	123	108	1.139	Round of 32
4	(Mozambique) Monjane – Martinho	3	0	3	3	0	6	0.000	69	126	0.548	

Source: FIVB

6 October 2023; 14:30	A. Mol – Sørum (Norway)	2–0	(Mozambique) Monjane – Martinho	Plazas de Toros Huamantla; Referees: Giovanni Bake (RSA), José María Padrón (ESP)
6 October 2023; 14:30	(21–13, 21–9); Report			Plazas de Toros Huamantla; Referees: Giovanni Bake (RSA), José María Padrón (ESP)

6 October 2023; 15:30	Boermans – De Groot (Netherlands)	1–2	(Italy) Lupo – Rossi	Plazas de Toros Huamantla; Referees: Robert Leko (SRB), Suzanne Lowry (USA)
6 October 2023; 15:30	(21–10, 21–23, 12–15); Report			Plazas de Toros Huamantla; Referees: Robert Leko (SRB), Suzanne Lowry (USA)

7 October 2023; 12:00	A. Mol – Sørum (Norway)	2–1	(Italy) Lupo – Rossi	Plazas de Toros Huamantla; Referees: Giovanni Bake (RSA), Suzanne Lowry (USA)
7 October 2023; 12:00	(19–21, 21–13, 15–10); Report			Plazas de Toros Huamantla; Referees: Giovanni Bake (RSA), Suzanne Lowry (USA)

7 October 2023; 19:00	Boermans – De Groot (Netherlands)	2–0	(Mozambique) Monjane – Martinho	Plazas de Toros Huamantla; Referees: Robert Leko (SRB), Carlos Rivera (PUR)
7 October 2023; 19:00	(21–8, 21–10); Report			Plazas de Toros Huamantla; Referees: Robert Leko (SRB), Carlos Rivera (PUR)

8 October 2023; 12:00	A. Mol – Sørum (Norway)	2–0	(Netherlands) Boermans – De Groot	Plazas de Toros Huamantla; Referees: José María Padron (ESP), Robert Leko (SRB)
8 October 2023; 12:00	(21–14, 21–13); Report			Plazas de Toros Huamantla; Referees: José María Padron (ESP), Robert Leko (SRB)

8 October 2023; 15:30	Lupo – Rossi (Italy)	2–0	(Mozambique) Monjane – Martinho	Plazas de Toros Huamantla; Referees: Juan Saavedra (COL), Suzanne Lowry (USA)
8 October 2023; 15:30	(21–15, 21–13); Report			Plazas de Toros Huamantla; Referees: Juan Saavedra (COL), Suzanne Lowry (USA)

=== Pool B ===
Pos	Team	Pld	W	L	Pts	SW	SL	SR	SPW	SPL	SPR	Qualification
1	(Sweden) Åhman – Hellvig	3	3	0	6	6	0	MAX	129	87	1.483	Round of 32
2	(Australia) Hodges – Schubert	3	2	1	5	4	2	2.000	117	111	1.054	Round of 32
3	(Portugal) Pedrosa – Campos	3	1	2	4	2	4	0.500	113	125	0.904	Lucky losers playoffs
4	(Ecuador) Leòn – Marcos	3	0	3	3	0	6	0.000	99	135	0.733	

Source: FIVB

6 October 2023; 14:30	Åhman – Hellvig (Sweden)	2–0	(Ecuador) Leòn – Marcos	Plazas de Toros Tlaxcala; Referees: Marlene Hernández (MEX), Wang Lijun (CHN)
6 October 2023; 14:30	(21–16, 21–12); Report			Plazas de Toros Tlaxcala; Referees: Marlene Hernández (MEX), Wang Lijun (CHN)

6 October 2023; 14:30	Hodges – Schubert (Australia)	2–0	(Portugal) Pedrosa – Campos	Plaza de la Constitución Tlaxcala; Referees: Lisandro dos Santos (BRA), Sylvain Druart (FRA)
6 October 2023; 14:30	(21–18, 21–18); Report			Plaza de la Constitución Tlaxcala; Referees: Lisandro dos Santos (BRA), Sylvain Druart (FRA)

8 October 2023; 09:00	Åhman – Hellvig (Sweden)	2–0	(Portugal) Pedrosa – Campos	Plazas de Toros Tlaxcala; Referees: Brian Hiebert (CAN), Sylvain Druart (FRA)
8 October 2023; 09:00	(21–12, 21–14); Report			Plazas de Toros Tlaxcala; Referees: Brian Hiebert (CAN), Sylvain Druart (FRA)

8 October 2023; 09:00	Hodges – Schubert (Australia)	2–0	(Ecuador) Leòn – Marcos	Plaza de la Constitución Tlaxcala; Referees: Giseli Amantino (BRA), Wang Lijun (CHN)
8 October 2023; 09:00	(21–19, 21–11); Report			Plaza de la Constitución Tlaxcala; Referees: Giseli Amantino (BRA), Wang Lijun (CHN)

9 October 2023; 10:00	Åhman – Hellvig (Sweden)	2–0	(Australia) Hodges – Schubert	Plazas de Toros Tlaxcala; Referees: Lisandro dos Santos (BRA), Mariko Satomi (JPN)
9 October 2023; 10:00	(21–11, 24–22); Report			Plazas de Toros Tlaxcala; Referees: Lisandro dos Santos (BRA), Mariko Satomi (JPN)

9 October 2023; 10:00	Pedrosa – Campos (Portugal)	2–0	(Ecuador) Leòn – Marcos	Plaza de la Constitución Tlaxcala; Referees: Osvaldo Sumavil (ARG), Emanuel Batani (MEX)
9 October 2023; 10:00	(30–28, 21–13); Report			Plaza de la Constitución Tlaxcala; Referees: Osvaldo Sumavil (ARG), Emanuel Batani (MEX)

=== Pool C ===
Pos	Team	Pld	W	L	Pts	SW	SL	SR	SPW	SPL	SPR	Qualification
1	(United States) Partain – Benesh	3	3	0	6	6	1	6.000	138	107	1.290	Round of 32
2	(Norway) H. Mol – Berntsen	3	2	1	5	4	3	1.333	131	130	1.008	Round of 32
3	Peter – Hernán	3	1	2	4	2	5	0.400	116	138	0.841	Lucky losers playoffs
4	(France) Krou – Gauthier-Rat	3	0	3	3	3	6	0.500	148	158	0.937	

Source: FIVB

6 October 2023; 15:30	Krou – Gauthier-Rat (France)	1–2	(Norway) H. Mol – Berntsen	Plaza de la Constitución Tlaxcala; Referees: Giseli Amantino (BRA), Brian Hiebert (CAN)
6 October 2023; 15:30	(21–14, 17–21, 11–15); Report			Plaza de la Constitución Tlaxcala; Referees: Giseli Amantino (BRA), Brian Hiebert (CAN)

6 October 2023; 21:00	Partain – Benesh (United States)	2–0	Peter – Hernán	Plazas de Toros Tlaxcala; Referees: Wang Lijun (CHN), Mariko Satomi (JPN)
6 October 2023; 21:00	(21–9, 21–14); Report			Plazas de Toros Tlaxcala; Referees: Wang Lijun (CHN), Mariko Satomi (JPN)

7 October 2023; 12:00	Krou – Gauthier-Rat (France)	1–2	Peter – Hernán	Plazas de Toros Tlaxcala; Referees: Brian Hiebert (CAN), Jean Mukundiyukuri (RWA)
7 October 2023; 12:00	(20–22, 21–19, 12–15); Report			Plazas de Toros Tlaxcala; Referees: Brian Hiebert (CAN), Jean Mukundiyukuri (RWA)

7 October 2023; 21:00	Partain – Benesh (United States)	2–0	(Norway) H. Mol – Berntsen	Plazas de Toros Tlaxcala; Referees: Osvaldo Sumavil (ARG), Mariko Satomi (JPN)
7 October 2023; 21:00	(23–21, 21–17); Report			Plazas de Toros Tlaxcala; Referees: Osvaldo Sumavil (ARG), Mariko Satomi (JPN)

8 October 2023; 15:30	Partain – Benesh (United States)	2–1	(France) Krou – Gauthier-Rat	Plazas de Toros Tlaxcala; Referees: Brian Hiebert (CAN), Emanuel Batani (MEX)
8 October 2023; 15:30	(16–21, 21–15, 15–10); Report			Plazas de Toros Tlaxcala; Referees: Brian Hiebert (CAN), Emanuel Batani (MEX)

8 October 2023; 15:30	H. Mol – Berntsen (Norway)	2–0	Peter – Hernán	Plaza de la Constitución Tlaxcala; Referees: Wang Lijun (CHN), Milán Vachutka (CZE)
8 October 2023; 15:30	(22–20, 21–17); Report			Plaza de la Constitución Tlaxcala; Referees: Wang Lijun (CHN), Milán Vachutka (CZE)

=== Pool D ===
Pos	Team	Pld	W	L	Pts	SW	SL	SR	SPW	SPL	SPR	Qualification
1	(United States) Crabb – Brunner	3	2	1	5	5	3	1.667	145	143	1.014	Round of 32
2	(Ukraine) Popov – Reznik	3	2	1	5	4	4	1.000	138	138	1.000	Round of 32
3	(United States) Evans – Budinger	3	1	2	4	2	4	0.500	117	113	1.035	Lucky losers playoffs
4	(Brazil) George – André	3	1	2	4	4	4	1.000	145	151	0.960	

Source: FIVB

6 October 2023; 15:30	George – André (Brazil)	2–0	(United States) Evans – Budinger	Plazas de Toros Tlaxcala; Referees: Nina Hobi (AUT), Milán Vachutka (CZE)
6 October 2023; 15:30	(21–17, 24–22); Report			Plazas de Toros Tlaxcala; Referees: Nina Hobi (AUT), Milán Vachutka (CZE)

6 October 2023; 21:00	Crabb – Brunner (United States)	1–2	(Ukraine) Popov – Reznik	Plaza de la Constitución Tlaxcala; Referees: Sylvain Druart (FRA), Nina Hobi (AUT)
6 October 2023; 21:00	(20–22, 21–18, 7–15); Report			Plaza de la Constitución Tlaxcala; Referees: Sylvain Druart (FRA), Nina Hobi (AUT)

7 October 2023; 16:30	George – André (Brazil)	1–2	(Ukraine) Popov – Reznik	Plazas de Toros Tlaxcala; Referees: Milán Vachutka (CZE), Emanuel Batani (MEX)
7 October 2023; 16:30	(21–19, 12–21, 15–17); Report			Plazas de Toros Tlaxcala; Referees: Milán Vachutka (CZE), Emanuel Batani (MEX)

7 October 2023; 21:00	Crabb – Brunner (United States)	2–0	(United States) Evans – Budinger	Plaza de la Constitución Tlaxcala; Referees: Brian Hiebert (CAN), Marlene Hernández (MEX)
7 October 2023; 21:00	(21–18, 21–18); Report			Plaza de la Constitución Tlaxcala; Referees: Brian Hiebert (CAN), Marlene Hernández (MEX)

8 October 2023; 21:00	George – André (Brazil)	1–2	(United States) Crabb – Brunner	Plazas de Toros Tlaxcala; Referees: Osvaldo Sumavil (ARG), Jean Mukundiyukuri (RWA)
8 October 2023; 21:00	(21–19, 19–21, 12–15); Report			Plazas de Toros Tlaxcala; Referees: Osvaldo Sumavil (ARG), Jean Mukundiyukuri (RWA)

8 October 2023; 21:00	Popov – Reznik (Ukraine)	0–2	(United States) Evans – Budinger	Plaza de la Constitución Tlaxcala; Referees: Giseli Amantino (BRA), Wang Lijun (CHN)
8 October 2023; 21:00	(15–21, 11–21); Report			Plaza de la Constitución Tlaxcala; Referees: Giseli Amantino (BRA), Wang Lijun (CHN)

=== Pool E ===
Pos	Team	Pld	W	L	Pts	SW	SL	SR	SPW	SPL	SPR	Qualification
1	(Austria) Seidl – Pristauz	3	3	0	6	6	1	6.000	141	116	1.216	Round of 32
2	(Italy) Ranghieri – Carambula	3	2	1	5	5	3	1.667	150	127	1.181	Round of 32
3	(Austria) Hörl – Horst	3	1	2	4	3	4	0.750	132	122	1.082	Round of 32
4	(Nicaragua) Mora – López	3	0	3	3	0	6	0.000	68	126	0.540	

Source: FIVB

6 October 2023; 14:30	Ranghieri – Carambula (Italy)	2–0	(Nicaragua) Mora – López	Plazas de Toros Apizaco; Referees: Rui Carvalho (POR), Agnieszka Myszkowska (POL)
6 October 2023; 14:30	(21–11, 21–11); Report			Plazas de Toros Apizaco; Referees: Rui Carvalho (POR), Agnieszka Myszkowska (POL)

6 October 2023; 15:30	Hörl – Horst (Austria)	0–2	(Austria) Seidl – Pristauz	Plazas de Toros Apizaco; Referees: Davide Crescentini (ITA), Brigham Beatie (USA)
6 October 2023; 15:30	(21–23, 19–21); Report			Plazas de Toros Apizaco; Referees: Davide Crescentini (ITA), Brigham Beatie (USA)

7 October 2023; 11:00	Ranghieri – Carambula (Italy)	1–2	(Austria) Seidl – Pristauz	Plazas de Toros Apizaco; Referees: Agnieszka Myszkowska (POL), Brigham Beatie (USA)
7 October 2023; 11:00	(21–19, 17–21, 12–15); Report			Plazas de Toros Apizaco; Referees: Agnieszka Myszkowska (POL), Brigham Beatie (USA)

7 October 2023; 12:00	Hörl – Horst (Austria)	2–0	(Nicaragua) Mora – López	Plazas de Toros Apizaco; Referees: Davide Crescentini (ITA), Charalampos Papadogoulas (GRE)
7 October 2023; 12:00	(21–9, 21–11); Report			Plazas de Toros Apizaco; Referees: Davide Crescentini (ITA), Charalampos Papadogoulas (GRE)

8 October 2023; 16:30	Ranghieri – Carambula (Italy)	2–1	(Austria) Hörl – Horst	Plazas de Toros Apizaco; Referees: Brigham Beatie (USA), Charalampos Papadogoulas (GRE)
8 October 2023; 16:30	(22–24, 21–16, 15–10); Report			Plazas de Toros Apizaco; Referees: Brigham Beatie (USA), Charalampos Papadogoulas (GRE)

8 October 2023; 21:00	Seidl – Pristauz (Austria)	2–0	(Nicaragua) Mora – López	Plazas de Toros Apizaco; Referees: Charalampos Papadogoulas (GRE), Brigham Beatie (USA)
8 October 2023; 21:00	(21–15, 21–11); Report			Plazas de Toros Apizaco; Referees: Charalampos Papadogoulas (GRE), Brigham Beatie (USA)

=== Pool F ===
Pos	Team	Pld	W	L	Pts	SW	SL	SR	SPW	SPL	SPR	Qualification
1	(Germany) Ehlers – Wickler	3	3	0	6	6	0	MAX	127	82	1.549	Round of 32
2	(Chile) Aravena – Droguett	3	2	1	5	4	2	2.000	116	124	0.935	Round of 32
3	(Poland) Kantor – Zdybek	3	1	2	4	2	4	0.500	111	131	0.847	Lucky losers playoffs
4	(United States) Schalk – Bourne	3	0	3	3	0	6	0.000	113	130	0.869	

Source: FIVB

7 October 2023; 11:30	Ehlers – Wickler (Germany)	2–0	(Chile) Aravena – Droguett	Plazas de Toros Tlaxcala; Referees: Osvaldo Sumavil (ARG), Sylvain Druart (FRA)
7 October 2023; 11:30	(21–7, 21–13); Report			Plazas de Toros Tlaxcala; Referees: Osvaldo Sumavil (ARG), Sylvain Druart (FRA)

7 October 2023; 11:00	Schalk – Bourne (United States)	0–2	(Poland) Kantor – Zdybek	Plaza de la Constitución Tlaxcala; Referees: Nina Hobi (AUT), Wang Lijun (CHN)
7 October 2023; 11:00	(19–21, 19–21); Report			Plaza de la Constitución Tlaxcala; Referees: Nina Hobi (AUT), Wang Lijun (CHN)

8 October 2023; 10:00	Ehlers – Wickler (Germany)	2–0	(Poland) Kantor – Zdybek	Plazas de Toros Tlaxcala; Referees: Milán Vachutka (CZE), Osvaldo Sumavil (ARG)
8 October 2023; 10:00	(21–12, 21–14); Report			Plazas de Toros Tlaxcala; Referees: Milán Vachutka (CZE), Osvaldo Sumavil (ARG)

8 October 2023; 10:00	Schalk – Bourne (United States)	0–2	(Chile) Aravena – Droguett	Plaza de la Constitución Tlaxcala; Referees: Jean Mukundiyukuri (RWA), Marlene Hernández (MEX)
8 October 2023; 10:00	(17–21, 22–24); Report			Plaza de la Constitución Tlaxcala; Referees: Jean Mukundiyukuri (RWA), Marlene Hernández (MEX)

9 October 2023; 09:00	Ehlers – Wickler (Germany)	2–0	(United States) Schalk – Bourne	Plazas de Toros Tlaxcala; Referees: Giseli Amantino (BRA), Brian Hiebert (CAN)
9 October 2023; 09:00	(22–20, 21–16); Report			Plazas de Toros Tlaxcala; Referees: Giseli Amantino (BRA), Brian Hiebert (CAN)

9 October 2023; 09:00	Kantor – Zdybek (Poland)	0–2	(Chile) Aravena – Droguett	Plaza de la Constitución Tlaxcala; Referees: Nina Hobi (AUT), Wang Lijun (CHN)
9 October 2023; 09:00	(28–30, 15–21); Report			Plaza de la Constitución Tlaxcala; Referees: Nina Hobi (AUT), Wang Lijun (CHN)

=== Pool G ===
Pos	Team	Pld	W	L	Pts	SW	SL	SR	SPW	SPL	SPR	Qualification
1	(Qatar) Cherif – Ahmed	3	3	0	6	6	1	6.000	137	90	1.522	Round of 32
2	(China) Halikejiang – Wu	3	2	1	5	4	2	2.000	116	104	1.115	Round of 32
3	(Brazil) Solberg – Carvalhaes	3	1	2	4	3	4	0.750	123	117	1.051	Round of 32
4	(Guatemala) Blanco – Garcia	3	0	3	3	0	6	0.000	61	126	0.484	

Source: FIVB

7 October 2023; 14:30	Solberg – Carvalhaes (Brazil)	0–2	(China) Halikejiang – Wu	Plazas de Toros Apizaco; Referees: Vincent Roche (FRA), Rui Jorge Carvalho (POR)
7 October 2023; 14:30	(18–21, 16–21); Report			Plazas de Toros Apizaco; Referees: Vincent Roche (FRA), Rui Jorge Carvalho (POR)

7 October 2023; 21:00	Cherif – Ahmed (Qatar)	2–0	(Guatemala) Blanco – Garcia	Plazas de Toros Apizaco; Referees: Davide Crescentini (ITA), Charalampos Papadogoulas (GRE)
7 October 2023; 21:00	(21–7, 21–4); Report			Plazas de Toros Apizaco; Referees: Davide Crescentini (ITA), Charalampos Papadogoulas (GRE)

8 October 2023; 11:00	Solberg – Carvalhaes (Brazil)	2–0	(Guatemala) Blanco – Garcia	Plazas de Toros Apizaco; Referees: Vincent Roche (FRA), Davide Crescentini (ITA)
8 October 2023; 11:00	(21–12, 21–10); Report			Plazas de Toros Apizaco; Referees: Vincent Roche (FRA), Davide Crescentini (ITA)

8 October 2023; 14:30	Cherif – Ahmed (Qatar)	2–0	(China) Halikejiang – Wu	Plazas de Toros Apizaco; Referees: Rui Carvalho (POR), Agnieszka Myszkowska (POL)
8 October 2023; 14:30	(21–18, 21–14); Report			Plazas de Toros Apizaco; Referees: Rui Carvalho (POR), Agnieszka Myszkowska (POL)

9 October 2023; 12:00	Cherif – Ahmed (Qatar)	2–1	(Brazil) Solberg – Carvalhaes	Plazas de Toros Apizaco; Referees: Davide Crescentini (ITA), Charalampos Papadogoulas (GRE)
9 October 2023; 12:00	(21–18, 17–21, 15–8); Report			Plazas de Toros Apizaco; Referees: Davide Crescentini (ITA), Charalampos Papadogoulas (GRE)

9 October 2023; 16:30	Halikejiang – Wu (China)	2–0	(Guatemala) Blanco – Garcia	Plazas de Toros Apizaco; Referees: Charalampos Papadogoulas (GRE), Davide Crescentini (ITA)
9 October 2023; 16:30	(21–14, 21–14); Report			Plazas de Toros Apizaco; Referees: Charalampos Papadogoulas (GRE), Davide Crescentini (ITA)

=== Pool H ===
Pos	Team	Pld	W	L	Pts	SW	SL	SR	SPW	SPL	SPR	Qualification
1	(Spain) Herrera – Gavira	3	3	0	6	6	0	MAX	127	91	1.396	Round of 32
2	(Italy) Cottafava – Nicolai	3	2	1	5	4	2	2.000	117	98	1.194	Round of 32
3	(Australia) McHugh – Burnett	3	1	2	4	2	4	0.500	113	123	0.919	Lucky losers playoffs
4	(Mexico) Barajas – Cruz	3	0	3	3	0	6	0.000	83	128	0.648	

Source: FIVB

6 October 2023; 19:00	Cottafava – Nicolai (Italy)	2–0	(Mexico) Barajas – Cruz	Plazas de Toros Tlaxcala; Referees: Lisandro dos Santos (BRA), Sylvain Druart (FRA)
6 October 2023; 19:00	(21–9, 21–11); Report			Plazas de Toros Tlaxcala; Referees: Lisandro dos Santos (BRA), Sylvain Druart (FRA)

6 October 2023; 19:00	Herrera – Gavira (Spain)	2–0	(Australia) McHugh – Burnett	Plaza de la Constitución Tlaxcala; Referees: Milán Vachutka (CZE), Emmanuel Batani (MEX)
6 October 2023; 19:00	(22–20, 21–13); Report			Plaza de la Constitución Tlaxcala; Referees: Milán Vachutka (CZE), Emmanuel Batani (MEX)

8 October 2023; 20:00	Cottafava – Nicolai (Italy)	2–0	(Australia) McHugh – Burnett	Plaza de la Constitución Tlaxcala; Referees: Nina Hobi (AUT), Marlene Hernández (MEX)
8 October 2023; 20:00	(21–18, 21–18); Report			Plaza de la Constitución Tlaxcala; Referees: Nina Hobi (AUT), Marlene Hernández (MEX)

8 October 2023; 20:00	Herrera – Gavira (Spain)	2–0	(Mexico) Barajas – Cruz	Plazas de Toros Tlaxcala; Referees: Sylvain Druart (FRA), Brian Hiebert (CAN)
8 October 2023; 20:00	(21–13, 21–12); Report			Plazas de Toros Tlaxcala; Referees: Sylvain Druart (FRA), Brian Hiebert (CAN)

9 October 2023; 20:00	Cottafava – Nicolai (Italy)	0–2	(Spain) Herrera – Gavira	Plaza de la Constitución Tlaxcala; Referees: Osvaldo Sumavil (ARG), Emanuel Batani (MEX)
9 October 2023; 20:00	(15–21, 18–21); Report			Plaza de la Constitución Tlaxcala; Referees: Osvaldo Sumavil (ARG), Emanuel Batani (MEX)

9 October 2023; 20:00	McHugh – Burnett (Australia)	2–0	(Mexico) Barajas – Cruz	Plazas de Toros Tlaxcala; Referees: Brian Hiebert (CAN), Mariko Satomi (JPN)
9 October 2023; 20:00	(21–17, 23–21); Report			Plazas de Toros Tlaxcala; Referees: Brian Hiebert (CAN), Mariko Satomi (JPN)

=== Pool I ===
Pos	Team	Pld	W	L	Pts	SW	SL	SR	SPW	SPL	SPR	Qualification
1	(Cuba) Alayo – Díaz	3	2	1	5	5	3	1.667	146	132	1.106	Round of 32
2	(Brazil) Evandro – Arthur	3	2	1	5	4	3	1.333	133	128	1.039	Round of 32
3	(Czech Republic) Perušič – Schweiner	3	1	2	4	3	4	0.750	122	112	1.089	Round of 32
4	(Mexico) Galindo – Aguirre	3	1	2	4	2	4	0.500	90	119	0.756	

Source: FIVB

6 October 2023; 20:00	Evandro – Arthur (Brazil)	0–2	(Mexico) Galindo – Aguirre	Plazas de Toros Apizaco; Referees: Brigham Beatie (USA), Davide Crescentini (ITA)
6 October 2023; 20:00	(17–21, 18–21); Report			Plazas de Toros Apizaco; Referees: Brigham Beatie (USA), Davide Crescentini (ITA)

6 October 2023; 21:00	Perušič – Schweiner (Czech Republic)	1–2	(Cuba) Alayo – Díaz	Plazas de Toros Apizaco; Referees: Charalampos Papadogoulas (GRE), Vincent Roche (FRA)
6 October 2023; 21:00	(17–21, 21–15, 9–15); Report			Plazas de Toros Apizaco; Referees: Charalampos Papadogoulas (GRE), Vincent Roche (FRA)

8 October 2023; 12:00	Evandro – Arthur (Brazil)	2–1	(Cuba) Alayo – Díaz	Plazas de Toros Apizaco; Referees: Charalampos Papadogoulas (GRE), Brigham Beatie (USA)
8 October 2023; 12:00	(22–20, 19–21, 15–12); Report			Plazas de Toros Apizaco; Referees: Charalampos Papadogoulas (GRE), Brigham Beatie (USA)

8 October 2023; 20:00	Perušič – Schweiner (Czech Republic)	2–0	(Mexico) Galindo – Aguirre	Plazas de Toros Apizaco; Referees: Vincent Roche (FRA), Davide Crescentini (ITA)
8 October 2023; 20:00	(21–11, 21–8); Report			Plazas de Toros Apizaco; Referees: Vincent Roche (FRA), Davide Crescentini (ITA)

9 October 2023; 11:00	Evandro – Arthur (Brazil)	2–0	(Czech Republic) Perušič – Schweiner	Plazas de Toros Apizaco; Referees: Rui Carvalho (POR), Brigham Beatie (USA)
9 October 2023; 11:00	(21–16, 21–17); Report			Plazas de Toros Apizaco; Referees: Rui Carvalho (POR), Brigham Beatie (USA)

9 October 2023; 20:00	Alayo – Díaz (Cuba)	2–0	(Mexico) Galindo – Aguirre	Plazas de Toros Apizaco; Referees: Rui Carvalho (POR), Agnieszka Myszkowska (POL)
9 October 2023; 20:00	(21–18, 21–11); Report			Plazas de Toros Apizaco; Referees: Rui Carvalho (POR), Agnieszka Myszkowska (POL)

=== Pool J ===
Pos	Team	Pld	W	L	Pts	SW	SL	SR	SPW	SPL	SPR	Qualification
1	(Netherlands) Immers – Van de Velde	3	3	0	6	6	1	6.000	144	120	1.200	Round of 32
2	(Netherlands) Brouwer – Meeuwsen	3	2	1	5	5	2	2.500	146	127	1.150	Round of 32
3	(Australia) Nicolaidis – Carracher	3	1	2	4	2	4	0.500	108	113	0.956	Lucky losers playoffs
4	(Thailand) Pithak – Poravid	3	0	3	3	0	6	0.000	89	127	0.701	

Source: FIVB

7 October 2023; 12:00	Brouwer – Meeuwsen (Netherlands)	2–0	(Thailand) Pithak – Poravid	Plaza de la Constitución Tlaxcala; Referees: Milán Vachutka (CZE), Emanuel Batani (MEX)
7 October 2023; 12:00	(21–14, 21–15); Report			Plaza de la Constitución Tlaxcala; Referees: Milán Vachutka (CZE), Emanuel Batani (MEX)

7 October 2023; 16:30	Immers – Van de Velde (Netherlands)	2–0	(Australia) Nicolaidis – Carracher	Plaza de la Constitución Tlaxcala; Referees: Giseli Amantino (BRA), Osvaldo Sumavil (ARG)
7 October 2023; 16:30	(21–12, 21–15); Report			Plaza de la Constitución Tlaxcala; Referees: Giseli Amantino (BRA), Osvaldo Sumavil (ARG)

8 October 2023; 16:30	Brouwer – Meeuwsen (Netherlands)	2–0	(Australia) Nicolaidis – Carracher	Plazas de Toros Tlaxcala; Referees: Osvaldo Sumavil (ARG), Nina Hobi (AUT)
8 October 2023; 16:30	(21–18, 23–21); Report			Plazas de Toros Tlaxcala; Referees: Osvaldo Sumavil (ARG), Nina Hobi (AUT)

8 October 2023; 16:30	Immers – Van de Velde (Netherlands)	2–0	(Thailand) Pithak – Poravid	Plaza de la Constitución Tlaxcala; Referees: Marlene Hernandez (MEX), Mariko Satomi (JPN)
8 October 2023; 16:30	(21–13, 22–20); Report			Plaza de la Constitución Tlaxcala; Referees: Marlene Hernandez (MEX), Mariko Satomi (JPN)

9 October 2023; 16:30	Brouwer – Meeuwsen (Netherlands)	1–2	(Netherlands) Immers – Van de Velde	Plazas de Toros Tlaxcala; Referees: Emanuel Batani (MEX), Milán Vachutka (CZE)
9 October 2023; 16:30	(29–31, 21–13, 10–15); Report			Plazas de Toros Tlaxcala; Referees: Emanuel Batani (MEX), Milán Vachutka (CZE)

9 October 2023; 16:30	Nicolaidis – Carracher (Australia)	2–0	(Thailand) Pithak – Poravid	Plaza de la Constitución Tlaxcala; Referees: Mariko Satomi (JPN), Jean Mukundiyukuri (RWA)
9 October 2023; 16:30	(21–18, 21–9); Report			Plaza de la Constitución Tlaxcala; Referees: Mariko Satomi (JPN), Jean Mukundiyukuri (RWA)

=== Pool K ===
Pos	Team	Pld	W	L	Pts	SW	SL	SR	SPW	SPL	SPR	Qualification
1	(Poland) Łosiak – Bryl	3	3	0	6	6	1	6.000	139	118	1.178	Round of 32
2	(Argentina) N. Capogrosso – T. Capogrosso	3	2	1	5	4	2	2.000	124	118	1.051	Round of 32
3	(Chile) M. Grimalt – E. Grimalt	3	1	2	4	3	4	0.750	132	133	0.992	Lucky losers playoffs
4	(France) Bassereau – Lyneel	3	0	3	3	0	6	0.000	103	129	0.798	

Source: FIVB

7 October 2023; 11:00	Łosiak – Bryl (Poland)	2–0	(France) Bassereau – Lyneel	Plazas de Toros Huamantla; Referees: José María Padrón (ESP), Juan Saavedra (COL)
7 October 2023; 11:00	(21–18, 21–14); Report			Plazas de Toros Huamantla; Referees: José María Padrón (ESP), Juan Saavedra (COL)

7 October 2023; 16:30	M. Grimalt – E. Grimalt (Chile)	0–2	(Argentina) N. Capogrosso – T. Capogrosso	Plazas de Toros Huamantla; Referees: Suzanne Lowry (USA), Giovanni Bake (RSA)
7 October 2023; 16:30	(22–24, 16–21); Report			Plazas de Toros Huamantla; Referees: Suzanne Lowry (USA), Giovanni Bake (RSA)

8 October 2023; 09:00	Łosiak – Bryl (Poland)	2–0	(Argentina) N. Capogrosso – T. Capogrosso	Plazas de Toros Huamantla; Referees: Robert Leko (SRB), Jose Maria Padron (ESP)
8 October 2023; 09:00	(21–16, 21–19); Report			Plazas de Toros Huamantla; Referees: Robert Leko (SRB), Jose Maria Padron (ESP)

8 October 2023; 14:30	M. Grimalt – E. Grimalt (Chile)	2–0	(France) Bassereau – Lyneel	Plazas de Toros Huamantla; Referees: Carlos Rivera (PUR), Giovanni Bake (RSA)
8 October 2023; 14:30	(22–20, 21–13); Report			Plazas de Toros Huamantla; Referees: Carlos Rivera (PUR), Giovanni Bake (RSA)

9 October 2023; 09:00	Łosiak – Bryl (Poland)	2–1	(Chile) M. Grimalt – E. Grimalt	Plazas de Toros Huamantla; Referees: Juan Saavedra (COL), José María Padron (ESP)
9 October 2023; 09:00	(19–21, 21–18, 15–12); Report			Plazas de Toros Huamantla; Referees: Juan Saavedra (COL), José María Padron (ESP)

9 October 2023; 12:00	N. Capogrosso – T. Capogrosso (Argentina)	2–0	(France) Bassereau – Lyneel	Plazas de Toros Huamantla; Referees: José María Padron (ESP), Juan Saavedra (COL)
9 October 2023; 12:00	(23–21, 21–17); Report			Plazas de Toros Huamantla; Referees: José María Padron (ESP), Juan Saavedra (COL)

=== Pool L ===
Pos	Team	Pld	W	L	Pts	SW	SL	SR	SPW	SPL	SPR	Qualification
1	(Brazil) Vitor Felipe – Renato	3	3	0	6	6	1	6.000	147	122	1.205	Round of 32
2	(Canada) Schachter – Dearing	3	2	1	5	5	2	2.500	137	116	1.181	Round of 32
3	(Mexico) Sarabia – Virgen	3	1	2	4	2	5	0.400	131	141	0.929	Lucky losers playoffs
4	(Morocco) Abicha – El Azhari	3	0	3	3	1	6	0.167	109	145	0.752	

Source: FIVB

6 October 2023; 20:00	Sarabia – Virgen (Mexico)	2–1	(Morocco) Abicha – El Azhari	Plazas de Toros Huamantla; Referees: Suzanne Lowry (USA), Robert Leko (SRB)
6 October 2023; 20:00	(25–27, 21–14, 15–11); Report			Plazas de Toros Huamantla; Referees: Suzanne Lowry (USA), Robert Leko (SRB)

6 October 2023; 21:00	Vitor Felipe – Renato (Brazil)	2–1	(Canada) Schachter – Dearing	Plazas de Toros Huamantla; Referees: Carlos Rivera (PUR), Juan Saavedra (COL)
6 October 2023; 21:00	(21–23, 22–20, 15–10); Report			Plazas de Toros Huamantla; Referees: Carlos Rivera (PUR), Juan Saavedra (COL)

8 October 2023; 20:00	Sarabia – Virgen (Mexico)	0–2	(Canada) Schachter – Dearing	Plazas de Toros Huamantla; Referees: Suzanne Lowry (USA), Juan Saavedra (COL)
8 October 2023; 20:00	(17–21, 12–21); Report			Plazas de Toros Huamantla; Referees: Suzanne Lowry (USA), Juan Saavedra (COL)

8 October 2023; 21:00	Vitor Felipe – Renato (Brazil)	2–0	(Morocco) Abicha – El Azhari	Plazas de Toros Huamantla; Referees: José María Padron (ESP), Robert Leko (SRB)
8 October 2023; 21:00	(21–13, 21–15); Report			Plazas de Toros Huamantla; Referees: José María Padron (ESP), Robert Leko (SRB)

9 October 2023; 16:30	Schachter – Dearing (Canada)	2–0	(Morocco) Abicha – El Azhari	Plazas de Toros Huamantla; Referees: Juan Saavedra (COL), José María Padron (ESP)
9 October 2023; 16:30	(21–19, 21–10); Report			Plazas de Toros Huamantla; Referees: Juan Saavedra (COL), José María Padron (ESP)

9 October 2023; 20:00	Sarabia – Virgen (Mexico)	0–2	(Brazil) Vitor Felipe – Renato	Plazas de Toros Huamantla; Referees: Suzanne Lowry (USA), Giovanni Bake (RSA)
9 October 2023; 20:00	(24–26, 17–21); Report			Plazas de Toros Huamantla; Referees: Suzanne Lowry (USA), Giovanni Bake (RSA)

=== Ranking of third-placed teams ===
Pos	Grp	Team	Pld	W	L	Pts	SW	SL	SR	SPW	SPL	SPR	Qualification
1	A	(Netherlands) Boermans – De Groot	3	1	2	4	3	4	0.750	123	108	1.139	Round of 32
2	I	(Czech Republic) Perušič – Schweiner	3	1	2	4	3	4	0.750	122	112	1.089	Round of 32
3	E	(Austria) Hörl – Horst	3	1	2	4	3	4	0.750	132	122	1.082	Round of 32
4	G	(Brazil) Solberg – Carvalhaes	3	1	2	4	3	4	0.750	123	117	1.051	Round of 32
5	K	(Chile) M. Grimalt – E. Grimalt	3	1	2	4	3	4	0.750	132	133	0.992	Lucky losers playoffs
6	D	(United States) Evans – Budinger	3	1	2	4	2	4	0.500	117	113	1.035	Lucky losers playoffs
7	J	(Australia) Nicolaidis – Carracher	3	1	2	4	2	4	0.500	108	113	0.956	Lucky losers playoffs
8	H	(Australia) McHugh – Burnett	3	1	2	4	2	4	0.500	113	123	0.919	Lucky losers playoffs
9	B	(Portugal) Pedrosa – Campos	3	1	2	4	2	4	0.500	113	125	0.904	Lucky losers playoffs
10	F	(Poland) Kantor – Zdybek	3	1	2	4	2	4	0.500	111	131	0.847	Lucky losers playoffs
11	L	(Mexico) Sarabia – Virgen	3	1	2	4	2	5	0.400	131	141	0.929	Lucky losers playoffs
12	C	Peter – Hernán	3	1	2	4	2	5	0.400	116	138	0.841	Lucky losers playoffs

Source: FIVB

=== Lucky losers playoffs ===
10 October 2023; 13:00	M. Grimalt – E. Grimalt (Chile)	2–0	Peter – Hernán	Plazas de Toros Tlaxcala; Referees: Agnieszka Myszkowska (POL), Charalampos Papadogoulas (GRE)
10 October 2023; 13:00	(21–16, 24–22); Report			Plazas de Toros Tlaxcala; Referees: Agnieszka Myszkowska (POL), Charalampos Papadogoulas (GRE)

10 October 2023; 13:00	Nicolaidis – Carracher (Australia)	0–2	(Poland) Kantor – Zdybek	Plaza de la Constitución Tlaxcala; Referees: Lisandro dos Santos (BRA), Jean Mukundiyukuri (RWA)
10 October 2023; 13:00	(17–21, 17–21); Report			Plaza de la Constitución Tlaxcala; Referees: Lisandro dos Santos (BRA), Jean Mukundiyukuri (RWA)

10 October 2023; 14:00	Evans – Budinger (United States)	2–0	(Mexico) Sarabia – Virgen	Plazas de Toros Tlaxcala; Referees: Vincent Roche (FRA), Rui Carvalho (POR)
10 October 2023; 14:00	(24–22, 21–19); Report			Plazas de Toros Tlaxcala; Referees: Vincent Roche (FRA), Rui Carvalho (POR)

10 October 2023; 14:00	McHugh – Burnett (Australia)	2–1	(Portugal) Pedrosa – Campos	Plaza de la Constitución Tlaxcala; Referees: Brian Hiebert (CAN), Sylvain Druart (FRA)
10 October 2023; 14:00	(21–17, 19–21, 15–12); Report			Plaza de la Constitución Tlaxcala; Referees: Brian Hiebert (CAN), Sylvain Druart (FRA)

== Knockout stage ==
=== Bracket ===
Round of 32
11 October
(Norway) A. Mol – Sørum	2
(Chile) M. Grimalt – E. Grimalt	0
11 October
(Argentina) N. Capogrosso – T. Capogrosso	0
(Italy) Cottafava – Nicolai	2
11 October
(Cuba) Alayo – Díaz	0
(Italy) Lupo – Rossi	2
11 October
(Czech Republic) Perušič – Schweiner	2
(Spain) Herrera – Gavira	0
11 October
(Austria) Seidl – Pristauz	1
(Brazil) Solberg – Carvalhaes	2
11 October
(Brazil) Evandro – Arthur	2
(Brazil) Vitor Felipe – Renato	0
11 October
(Canada) Schachter – Dearing	0
(Australia) Hodges – Schubert	2
11 October
(Australia) McHugh – Burnett	0
(United States) Crabb – Brunner	2
11 October
(United States) Partain – Benesh	2
(Poland) Kantor – Zdybek	0
11 October
(China) Halikejiang – Wu	0
(Italy) Ranghieri – Carambula	2
11 October
(Poland) Łosiak – Bryl	2
(Norway) H. Mol – Berntsen	0
11 October
(Austria) Hörl – Horst	0
(Germany) Ehlers – Wickler	2
11 October
(Qatar) Cherif – Ahmed	0
(Netherlands) Boermans – De Groot	2
11 October
(Ukraine) Popov – Reznik	0
(Netherlands) Immers – Van de Velde	2
11 October
(Netherlands) Brouwer – Meeuwsen	2
(Chile) Aravena – Droguett	1
11 October
(United States) Evans – Budinger	0
(Sweden) Åhman – Hellvig	2

Round of 16
12 October
(Norway) A. Mol – Sørum	2
(Italy) Cottafava – Nicolai	0
12 October
(Italy) Lupo – Rossi	0
(Czech Republic) Perušič – Schweiner	2
12 October
(Brazil) Solberg – Carvalhaes	2
(Brazil) Evandro – Arthur	1
12 October
(Australia) Hodges – Schubert	0
(United States) Crabb – Brunner	2
12 October
(United States) Partain – Benesh	2
(Italy) Ranghieri – Carambula	0
12 October
(Poland) Łosiak – Bryl	2
(Germany) Ehlers – Wickler	0
12 October
(Netherlands) Boermans – De Groot	2
(Netherlands) Immers – Van de Velde	1
12 October
(Netherlands) Brouwer – Meeuwsen	0
(Sweden) Åhman – Hellvig	2

Quarter-finals
13 October
(Norway) A. Mol – Sørum	1
(Czech Republic) Perušič – Schweiner	2
13 October
(Brazil) Solberg – Carvalhaes	0
(United States) Crabb – Brunner	2
13 October
(United States) Partain – Benesh	0
(Poland) Łosiak – Bryl	2
13 October
(Netherlands) Boermans – De Groot	1
(Sweden) Åhman – Hellvig	2

Semi-finals
14 October
(Czech Republic) Perušič – Schweiner	2
(United States) Crabb – Brunner	0
14 October
(Poland) Łosiak – Bryl	1
(Sweden) Åhman – Hellvig	2

Final
15 October
(Czech Republic) Perušič – Schweiner	2
(Sweden) Åhman – Hellvig	1
Third place
15 October
(United States) Crabb – Brunner	0
(Poland) Łosiak – Bryl	2

=== Round of 32 ===
11 October 2023; 11:00	N. Capogrosso – T. Capogrosso (Argentina)	0–2	(Italy) Cottafava – Nicolai	Plazas de Toros Tlaxcala; Referees: Wang Lijun (CHN), Marlene Hernández (MEX)
11 October 2023; 11:00	(17–21, 12–21); Report			Plazas de Toros Tlaxcala; Referees: Wang Lijun (CHN), Marlene Hernández (MEX)

11 October 2023; 11:00	Seidl – Pristauz (Austria)	1–2	(Brazil) Solberg – Carvalhaes	Plazas de Toros Huamantla; Referees: Robert Leko (SRB), Juan Saavedra (COL)
11 October 2023; 11:00	(21–13, 15–21, 11–15); Report			Plazas de Toros Huamantla; Referees: Robert Leko (SRB), Juan Saavedra (COL)

11 October 2023; 11:00	Łosiak – Bryl (Poland)	2–0	(Norway) H. Mol – Berntsen	Plaza de la Constitución Tlaxcala; Referees: Nina Hobi (AUT), Milán Vachutka (CZE)
11 October 2023; 11:00	(21–18, 21–16); Report			Plaza de la Constitución Tlaxcala; Referees: Nina Hobi (AUT), Milán Vachutka (CZE)

11 October 2023; 11:00	Evans – Budinger (United States)	0–2	(Sweden) Åhman – Hellvig	Plazas de Toros Apizaco; Referees: Agnieszka Myszkowska (POL), Rui Carvalho (POR)
11 October 2023; 11:00	(17–21, 15–21); Report			Plazas de Toros Apizaco; Referees: Agnieszka Myszkowska (POL), Rui Carvalho (POR)

11 October 2023; 12:00	A. Mol – Sørum (Norway)	2–0	(Chile) M. Grimalt – E. Grimalt	Plazas de Toros Tlaxcala; Referees: Jean Mukundiyukuri (RWA), Osvaldo Sumavil (ARG)
11 October 2023; 12:00	(21–12, 21–15); Report			Plazas de Toros Tlaxcala; Referees: Jean Mukundiyukuri (RWA), Osvaldo Sumavil (ARG)

11 October 2023; 12:00	Evandro – Arthur (Brazil)	2–0	(Brazil) Vitor Felipe – Renato	Plazas de Toros Huamantla; Referees: José María Padron (ESP), Carlos Rivera (PUR)
11 October 2023; 12:00	(30–28, 21–16); Report			Plazas de Toros Huamantla; Referees: José María Padron (ESP), Carlos Rivera (PUR)

11 October 2023; 12:00	Hörl – Horst (Austria)	0–2	(Germany) Ehlers – Wickler	Plaza de la Constitución Tlaxcala; Referees: Giseli Amantino (BRA), Mariko Satomi (JPN)
11 October 2023; 12:00	(12–21, 17–21); Report			Plaza de la Constitución Tlaxcala; Referees: Giseli Amantino (BRA), Mariko Satomi (JPN)

11 October 2023; 12:00	Brouwer – Meeuwsen (Netherlands)	2–1	(Chile) Aravena – Droguett	Plazas de Toros Apizaco; Referees: Brigham Beatie (USA), Davide Crescentini (ITA)
11 October 2023; 12:00	(17–21, 23–21, 15–7); Report			Plazas de Toros Apizaco; Referees: Brigham Beatie (USA), Davide Crescentini (ITA)

11 October 2023; 17:00	Alayo – Díaz (Cuba)	0–2	(Italy) Lupo – Rossi	Plazas de Toros Tlaxcala; Referees: Lisandro dos Santos (BRA), Wang Lijun (CHN)
11 October 2023; 17:00	(16–21, 15–21); Report			Plazas de Toros Tlaxcala; Referees: Lisandro dos Santos (BRA), Wang Lijun (CHN)

11 October 2023; 17:00	Schachter – Dearing (Canada)	0–2	(Australia) Hodges – Schubert	Plazas de Toros Huamantla; Referees: Juan Saavedra (COL), Suzanne Lowry (USA)
11 October 2023; 17:00	(16–21, 22–24); Report			Plazas de Toros Huamantla; Referees: Juan Saavedra (COL), Suzanne Lowry (USA)

11 October 2023; 17:00	Halikejiang – Wu (China)	0–2	(Italy) Ranghieri – Carambula	Plaza de la Constitución Tlaxcala; Referees: Sylvain Druart (FRA), Nina Hobi (AUT)
11 October 2023; 17:00	(17–21, 23–25); Report			Plaza de la Constitución Tlaxcala; Referees: Sylvain Druart (FRA), Nina Hobi (AUT)

11 October 2023; 17:00	Popov – Reznik (Ukraine)	0–2	(Netherlands) Immers – Van de Velde	Plazas de Toros Apizaco; Referees: Davide Crescentini (ITA), Brigham Beatie (USA)
11 October 2023; 17:00	(16–21, 13–21); Report			Plazas de Toros Apizaco; Referees: Davide Crescentini (ITA), Brigham Beatie (USA)

11 October 2023; 18:00	Perušič – Schweiner (Czech Republic)	2–0	(Spain) Herrera – Gavira	Plazas de Toros Tlaxcala; Referees: Brian Hiebert (CAN), Giseli Amantino (BRA)
11 October 2023; 18:00	(21–19, 21–17); Report			Plazas de Toros Tlaxcala; Referees: Brian Hiebert (CAN), Giseli Amantino (BRA)

11 October 2023; 18:00	McHugh – Burnett (Australia)	0–2	(United States) Crabb – Brunner	Plazas de Toros Huamantla; Referees: Carlos Rivera (PUR), José María Padron (ESP)
11 October 2023; 18:00	(15–21, 17–21); Report			Plazas de Toros Huamantla; Referees: Carlos Rivera (PUR), José María Padron (ESP)

11 October 2023; 18:00	Partain – Benesh (United States)	2–0	(Poland) Kantor – Zdybek	Plaza de la Constitución Tlaxcala; Referees: Osvaldo Sumavil (ARG), Jean Mukundiyukuri (RWA)
11 October 2023; 18:00	(21–17, 21–16); Report			Plaza de la Constitución Tlaxcala; Referees: Osvaldo Sumavil (ARG), Jean Mukundiyukuri (RWA)

11 October 2023; 18:00	Cherif – Ahmed (Qatar)	0–2	(Netherlands) Boermans – De Groot	Plazas de Toros Apizaco; Referees: Charalampos Papadogoulas (GRE), Vincent Roche (FRA)
11 October 2023; 18:00	(17–21, 14–21); Report			Plazas de Toros Apizaco; Referees: Charalampos Papadogoulas (GRE), Vincent Roche (FRA)

=== Round of 16 ===
12 October 2023; 17:00	A. Mol – Sørum (Norway)	2–0	(Italy) Cottafava – Nicolai	Plazas de Toros Tlaxcala; Referees: Lisandro dos Santos (BRA), Giseli Amantino (BRA)
12 October 2023; 17:00	(21–19, 21–17); Report			Plazas de Toros Tlaxcala; Referees: Lisandro dos Santos (BRA), Giseli Amantino (BRA)

12 October 2023; 17:00	Brouwer – Meeuwsen (Netherlands)	0–2	(Sweden) Åhman – Hellvig	Plazas de Toros Apizaco; Referees: Brigham Beatie (USA), Agnieszka Myszkowska (POL)
12 October 2023; 17:00	(13–21, 11–21); Report			Plazas de Toros Apizaco; Referees: Brigham Beatie (USA), Agnieszka Myszkowska (POL)

12 October 2023; 18:00	Hodges – Schubert (Australia)	0–2	(United States) Crabb – Brunner	Plazas de Toros Huamantla; Referees: Giovanni Bake (RSA), Robert Leko (SRB)
12 October 2023; 18:00	(17–21, 17–21); Report			Plazas de Toros Huamantla; Referees: Giovanni Bake (RSA), Robert Leko (SRB)

12 October 2023; 18:00	Łosiak – Bryl (Poland)	2–0	(Germany) Ehlers – Wickler	Plaza de la Constitución Tlaxcala; Referees: Brian Hiebert (CAN), Sylvain Druart (FRA)
12 October 2023; 18:00	(21–18, 21–16); Report			Plaza de la Constitución Tlaxcala; Referees: Brian Hiebert (CAN), Sylvain Druart (FRA)

12 October 2023; 19:00	Lupo – Rossi (Italy)	0–2	(Czech Republic) Perušič – Schweiner	Plazas de Toros Tlaxcala; Referees: Giseli Amantino (BRA), Emanuel Batani (MEX)
12 October 2023; 19:00	(15–21, 17–21); Report			Plazas de Toros Tlaxcala; Referees: Giseli Amantino (BRA), Emanuel Batani (MEX)

12 October 2023; 19:00	Solberg – Carvalhaes (Brazil)	2–1	(Brazil) Evandro – Arthur	Plazas de Toros Huamantla; Referees: Carlos Rivera (PUR), José María Padrón (ESP)
12 October 2023; 19:00	(15–21, 24–22, 15–10); Report			Plazas de Toros Huamantla; Referees: Carlos Rivera (PUR), José María Padrón (ESP)

12 October 2023; 19:00	Partain – Benesh (United States)	2–0	(Italy) Ranghieri – Carambula	Plaza de la Constitución Tlaxcala; Referees: Milán Vachutka (CZE), Osvaldo Sumavil (ARG)
12 October 2023; 19:00	(21–14, 21–17); Report			Plaza de la Constitución Tlaxcala; Referees: Milán Vachutka (CZE), Osvaldo Sumavil (ARG)

12 October 2023; 19:00	Boermans – De Groot (Netherlands)	2–1	(Netherlands) Immers – Van de Velde	Plazas de Toros Apizaco; Referees: Rui Carvalho (POR), Brigham Beatie (USA)
12 October 2023; 19:00	(21–18, 16–21, 15–13); Report			Plazas de Toros Apizaco; Referees: Rui Carvalho (POR), Brigham Beatie (USA)

=== Quarterfinals ===
13 October 2023; 16:00	Partain – Benesh (United States)	0–2	(Poland) Łosiak – Bryl	Plaza de la Constitución Tlaxcala; Referees: Lisandro dos Santos (BRA), Milán Vachutka (CZE)
13 October 2023; 16:00	(19–21, 16–21); Report			Plaza de la Constitución Tlaxcala; Referees: Lisandro dos Santos (BRA), Milán Vachutka (CZE)

13 October 2023; 18:00	A. Mol – Sørum (Norway)	1–2	(Czech Republic) Perušič – Schweiner	Plazas de Toros Tlaxcala; Referees: Brian Hiebert (CAN), Jean Mukundiyukuri (RWA)
13 October 2023; 18:00	(14–21, 21–14, 12–15); Report			Plazas de Toros Tlaxcala; Referees: Brian Hiebert (CAN), Jean Mukundiyukuri (RWA)

13 October 2023; 19:00	Boermans – De Groot (Netherlands)	1–2	(Sweden) Åhman – Hellvig	Plazas de Toros Apizaco; Referees: Davide Crescentini (ITA), Rui Carvalho (POR)
13 October 2023; 19:00	(30–32, 24–22, 12–15); Report			Plazas de Toros Apizaco; Referees: Davide Crescentini (ITA), Rui Carvalho (POR)

13 October 2023; 20:00	Solberg – Carvalhaes (Brazil)	0–2	(United States) Crabb – Brunner	Plazas de Toros Huamantla; Referees: Robert Leko (SRB), Giovanni Bake (RSA)
13 October 2023; 20:00	(17–21, 14–21); Report			Plazas de Toros Huamantla; Referees: Robert Leko (SRB), Giovanni Bake (RSA)

=== Semifinals ===
14 October 2023; 17:00	Łosiak – Bryl (Poland)	1–2	(Sweden) Åhman – Hellvig	Plazas de Toros Tlaxcala; Referees: Davide Crescentini (ITA), Brian Hiebert (CAN)
14 October 2023; 17:00	(11–21, 22–20, 16–18); Report			Plazas de Toros Tlaxcala; Referees: Davide Crescentini (ITA), Brian Hiebert (CAN)

14 October 2023; 19:00	Perušič – Schweiner (Czech Republic)	2–0	(United States) Crabb – Brunner	Plazas de Toros Tlaxcala; Referees: Juan Saavedra (COL), Osvaldo Sumavil (ARG)
14 October 2023; 19:00	(21–15, 21–12); Report			Plazas de Toros Tlaxcala; Referees: Juan Saavedra (COL), Osvaldo Sumavil (ARG)

=== Third place game ===
15 October 2023; 12:00	Crabb – Brunner (United States)	0–2	(Poland) Łosiak – Bryl	Plazas de Toros Tlaxcala; Referees: Carlos Rivera (PUR), Robert Leko (SRB)
15 October 2023; 12:00	(17–21, 18–21); Report			Plazas de Toros Tlaxcala; Referees: Carlos Rivera (PUR), Robert Leko (SRB)

=== Final ===
15 October 2023; 14:30	Perušič – Schweiner (Czech Republic)	2–1	(Sweden) Åhman – Hellvig	Plazas de Toros Tlaxcala; Referees: Charalampos Papadogoulas (GRE), Osvaldo Sumavil (ARG)
15 October 2023; 14:30	(21–15, 17–21, 15–13); Report			Plazas de Toros Tlaxcala; Referees: Charalampos Papadogoulas (GRE), Osvaldo Sumavil (ARG)

== Final ranking ==
Rank	Team
Gold medal	(Czech Republic) Perušič – Schweiner
Silver medal	(Sweden) Åhman – Hellvig
Bronze medal	(Poland) Łosiak – Bryl
4	(United States) Crabb – Brunner
5	(Brazil) Solberg – Carvalhaes
5	(Netherlands) Boermans – De Groot
5	(Norway) A. Mol – Sørum
5	(United States) Partain – Benesh
9	(Australia) Hodges – Schubert
9	(Brazil) Evandro – Arthur
9	(Germany) Ehlers – Wickler
9	(Italy) Cottafava – Nicolai
9	(Italy) Lupo – Rossi
9	(Italy) Ranghieri – Carambula
9	(Netherlands) Brouwer – Meeuwsen
9	(Netherlands) Immers – Van de Velde
17	(Argentina) N. Capogrosso – T. Capogrosso
17	(Australia) McHugh – Burnett
17	(Austria) Hörl – Horst
17	(Austria) Seidl – Pristauz
17	(Brazil) Vitor Felipe – Renato
17	(Canada) Schachter – Dearing
17	(Chile) Aravena – Droguett
17	(Chile) M. Grimalt – E. Grimalt
17	(China) Halikejiang – Wu
17	(Cuba) Alayo – Díaz
17	(Spain) Herrera – Gavira
17	(Norway) H. Mol – Berntsen
17	(Poland) Kantor – Zdybek
17	(Qatar) Cherif – Ahmed
17	(Ukraine) Popov – Reznik
17	(United States) Evans – Budinger
33	(Australia) Nicolaidis – Carracher
33	Peter – Hernán
33	(Mexico) Sarabia – Virgen
33	(Portugal) Pedrosa – Campos
37	(Brazil) George – André
37	(Ecuador) Leòn – Marcos
37	(France) Bassereau – Lyneel
37	(France) Krou – Gauthier-Rat
37	(Guatemala) Blanco – Garcia
37	(Morocco) Abicha – El Azhari
37	(Mexico) Barajas – Cruz
37	(Mexico) Galindo – Aguirre
37	(Mozambique) Monjane – Martinho
37	(Nicaragua) Mora – López
37	(Thailand) Pithak – Poravid
37	(United States) Schalk – Bourne

== See also ==
- 2023 Beach Volleyball World Championships – Women's tournament
