= Jonatan Hellvig =

Swedish beach volleyball player

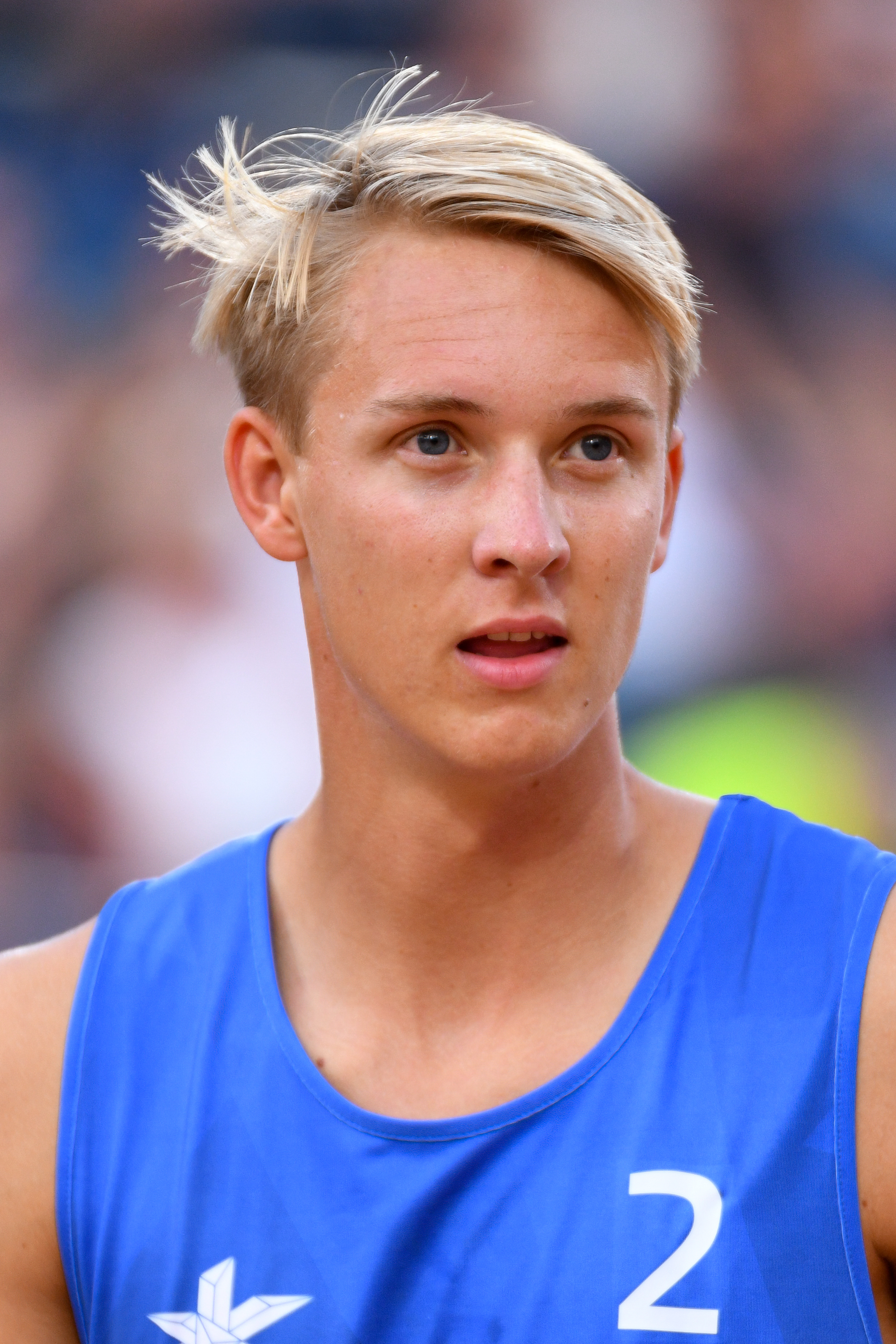
- Hellvig in 2022

Personal information
- Full name: Anders Jonatan Hellvig
- Nationality: Swedish
- Born: 5 October 2001 (age 25); Lidingö, Sweden
- Height: 1.94 m (6 ft 4 in)

Beach volleyball information

Current teammate
Years	Teammate
2018–present	David Åhman
Honours
Men's beach volleyball
Representing Sweden
Olympic Games
Gold medal – first place	2024 Paris	Beach
World Championships
Gold medal – first place	2025 Australia	Beach
Silver medal – second place	2023 Mexico	Beach
European Championships
Gold medal – first place	2022 Munich	Beach
Gold medal – first place	2023 Vienna	Beach
Silver medal – second place	2025 Düsseldorf	Beach
U21 World Championships
Gold medal – first place	2021 Phuket	Beach
Youth Olympics
Gold medal – first place	2018 Buenos Aires	Beach
U22 European Championships
Gold medal – first place	2021 Baden	Beach
U20 European Championships
Gold medal – first place	2020 Brno	Beach
U18 European Championships
Gold medal – first place	2018 Brno	Beach

Anders Jonatan Hellvig (born 5 October 2001) is a Swedish professional beach volleyball player. Together with teammate David Åhman he won the gold medal at the 2024 Summer Olympics in Paris.
