= David Åhman =

Swedish beach volleyball player

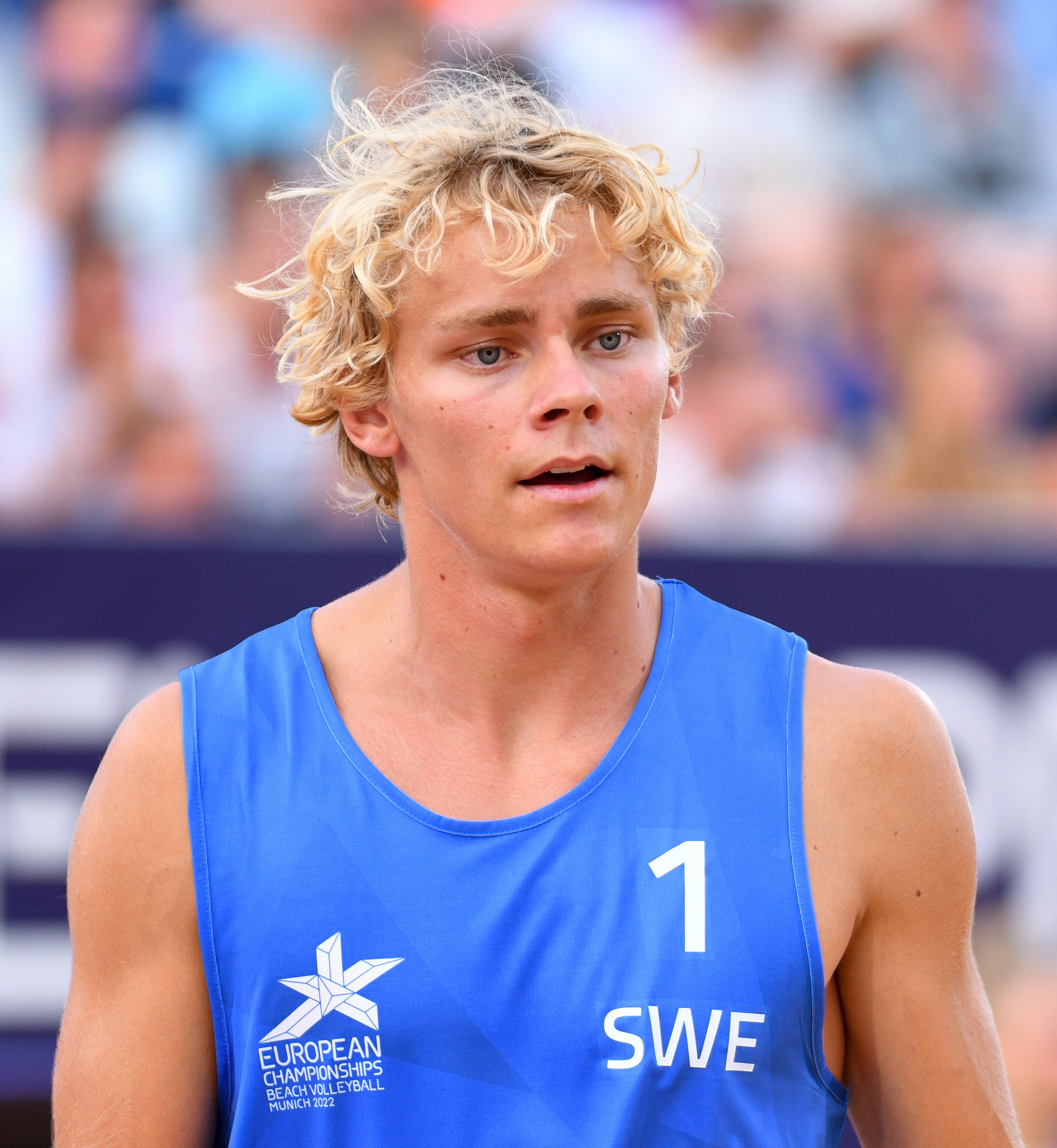
- Åhman at the 2022 European Championships

Personal information
- Full name: Klas David Åhman
- Nationality: Swedish
- Born: 20 December 2001 (age 24); Umeå, Sweden
- Height: 1.90 m (6 ft 3 in)

Beach volleyball information

Current teammate
Years	Teammate
2018–present	Jonatan Hellvig
Honours
Men's beach volleyball
Representing Sweden
Olympic Games
Gold medal – first place	2024 Paris	Beach
World Championships
Gold medal – first place	2025 Australia	Beach
Silver medal – second place	2023 Mexico	Beach
European Championships
Gold medal – first place	2022 Munich	Beach
Gold medal – first place	2023 Vienna	Beach
Silver medal – second place	2025 Düsseldorf	Beach
U21 World Championships
Gold medal – first place	2021 Phuket	Beach
Youth Olympics
Gold medal – first place	2018 Buenos Aires	Beach
U22 European Championships
Gold medal – first place	2021 Baden	Beach
Gold medal – first place	2022 Vlissingen	Beach
U20 European Championships
Gold medal – first place	2020 Brno	Beach
U18 European Championships
Gold medal – first place	2018 Brno	Beach

Klas David Åhman (born 20 December 2001) is a Swedish professional beach volleyball player. Together with Jonatan Hellvig, he won the gold medal at the 2024 Summer Olympics and the gold medal at the 2025 Beach Volleyball World Championships.
