= Miles Evans =

American beach volleyball player (born 1989)

Personal information
- Born: November 12, 1989 (age 36)
- Height: 6 ft 4 in (193 cm)
- Education: UC Santa Barbara Gauchos

Beach volleyball information

Current teammate
Teammate
Chase Budinger

National team
United States (beach)
- Last updated: 20:29, 22 July 2024 (UTC)

Miles Evans (born November 12, 1989) is an American professional beach volleyball player. He is a member of the United States national beach volleyball team and competed at the 2024 Summer Olympics.

== Early life and education ==
Evans attended high school at Dos Pueblos High School where he played volleyball. He later attended the University of California, Santa Barbara where he played for the UC Santa Barbara Gauchos men's volleyball team. He played two seasons for the Gauchos before pursuing a professional beach volleyball career.

== Professional career ==
Evans started his professional career in 2014, over which he's had 20 different partners. Evans played on the Association of Volleyball Professionals Tour as well as the FIVB Beach Volleyball World Tour. In July 2022, Evans won his first AVP Tour title at the Denver Open with future Olympian Andy Benesh.

Evans has been paired with Chase Budinger since 2023.

== Olympics ==
Evans, with partner Chase Budinger, qualified to represent the United States at the 2024 Summer Olympics alongside fellow American team Miles Partain and Andy Benesh. The pairing's international ranking elevated them above UC Santa Barbara Gaucho alum Theo Brunner and partner Trevor Crabb in the final month.

Miles Evans/ Chase Budinger went on to finish 9th place at the 2024 Paris Olympics after being eliminated by eventual bronze medalists Christian Sorum/ Anders Mol from Norway.
