= Bartosz Łosiak =

Polish beach volleyball player (born 1992)

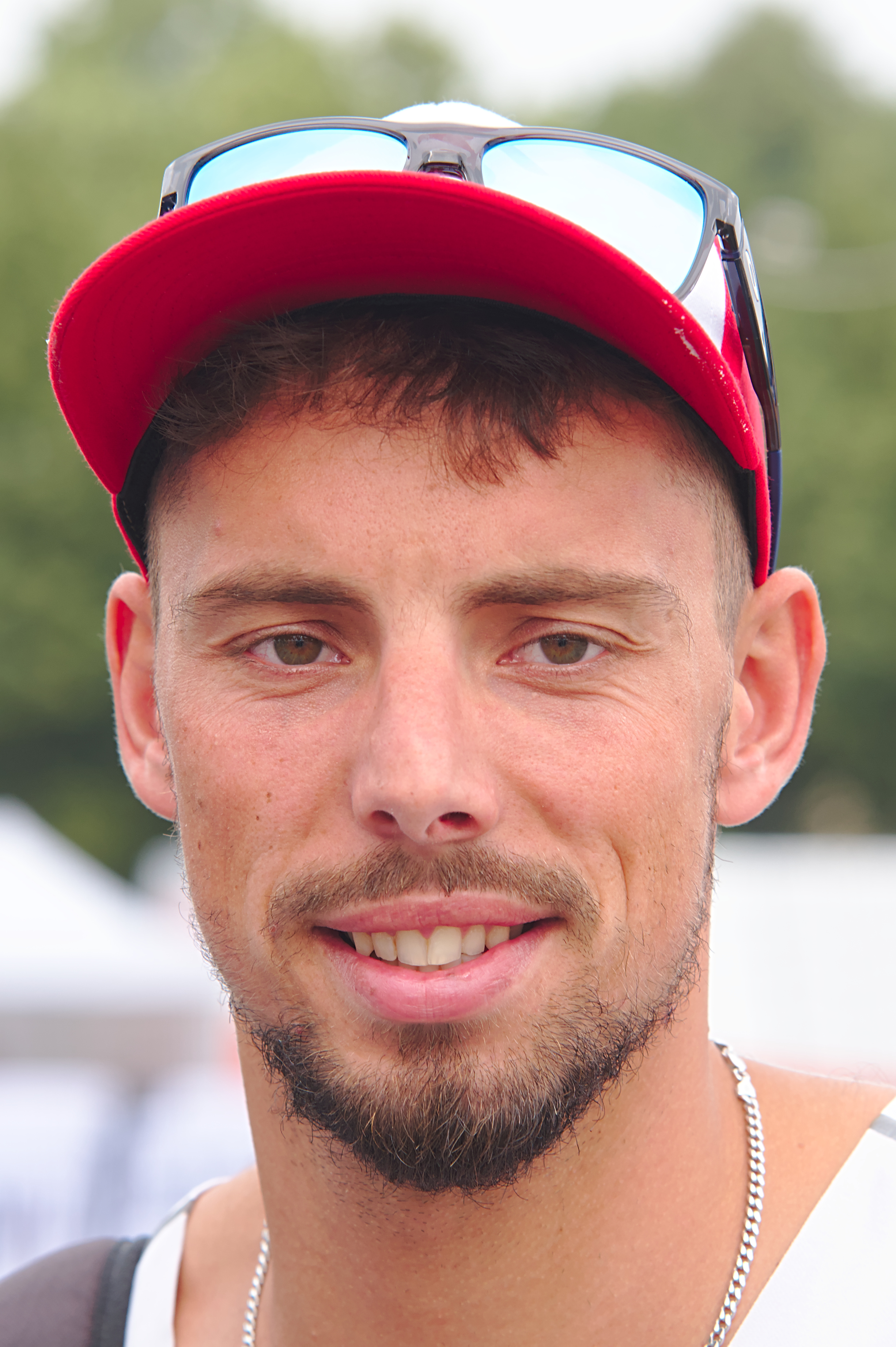

Personal information
- Nationality: Polish
- Born: 14 May 1992 (age 34); Jastrzębie-Zdrój, Poland
- Height: 1.90 m (6 ft 3 in)
- Weight: 88 kg (194 lb)
Honours
Men's beach volleyball
Representing Poland
World Championships
Bronze medal – third place	2023 Mexico	Beach
European Championship
Bronze medal – third place	2021 Vienna	Beach

Bartosz Łosiak (born 14 May 1992) is a Polish Olympic beach volleyball player. He is a defender and plays on the right side.

Awards
Preceded by Phil Dalhausser (USA)	Men's FIVB World Tour "Best Setter"; 2017	Succeeded by Jānis Šmēdiņš
