= Ondřej Perušič =

Czech beach volleyball player (born 1994)

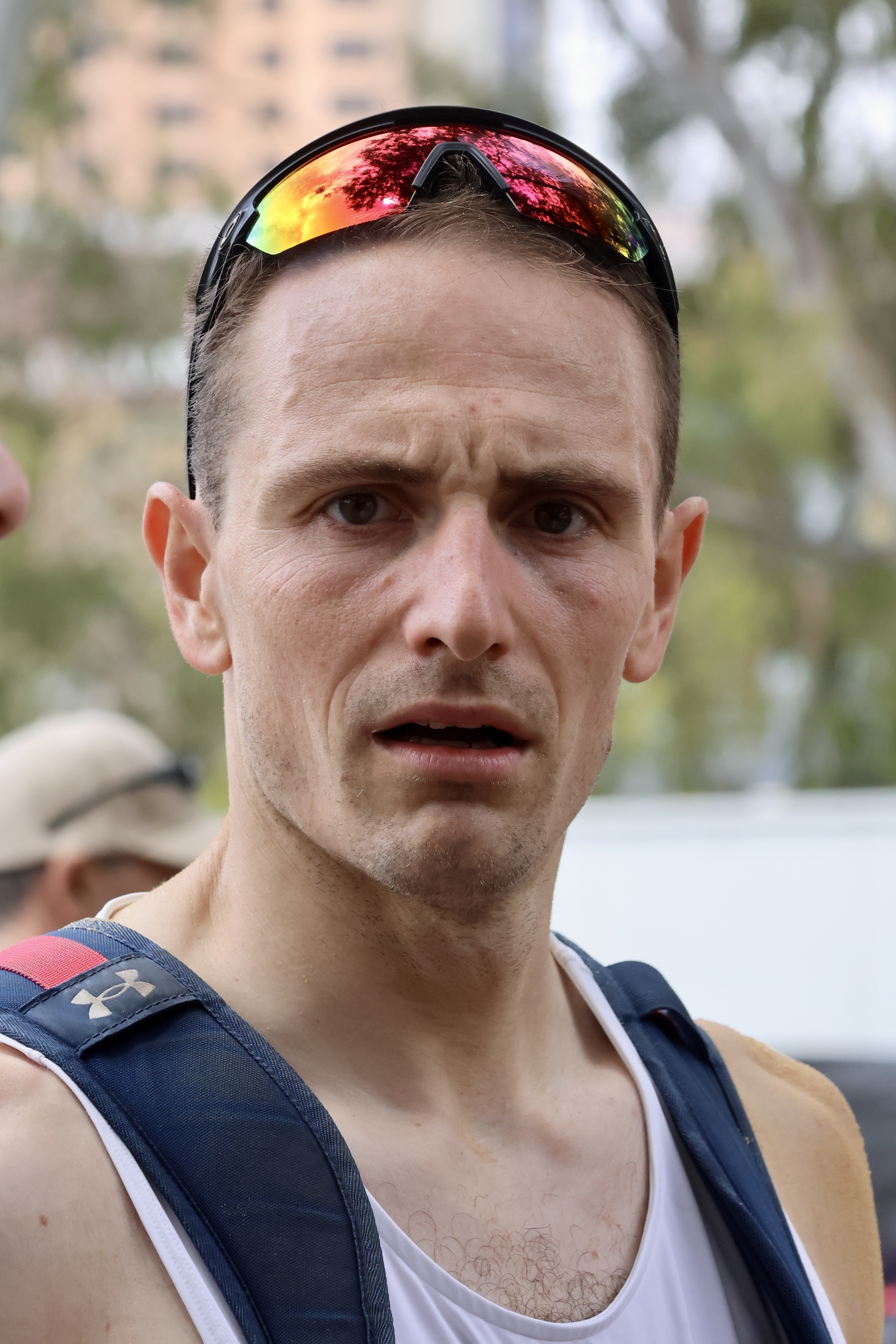
- Perušič at the 2025 Beach Volleyball World Championships

Personal information
- Nationality: Czech
- Born: 26 September 1994 (age 31) Prague, Czech Republic
- Height: 1.90 m (6 ft 3 in)

Sport
- Sport: Beach volleyball
Medal record
Men's beach volleyball
Representing the Czech Republic
World Championships
Gold medal – first place	2023 Mexico	Beach
European Championships
Silver medal – second place	2022 Munich	Beach

Ondřej Perušič (Czech pronunciation: [ˈondr̝ɛj ˈpɛruʃɪtʃ]; born 26 September 1994) is a Czech beach volleyball player. He competed in the 2020 Summer Olympics.

His parental grandfather is Czech Olympic volleyball player of Croatian descent Boris Perušič.
