= Jorge Barajas =

Mexican volleyball player (born 1991)

Personal information
- Nationality: Mexican
- Born: 7 May 1991 (age 35)
- Height: 1.88 m (6 ft 2 in)
- Weight: 80 kg (176 lb)
- Spike: 340 cm (134 in)
- Block: 320 cm (126 in)

Volleyball information
- Number: 11

Career
Years	Teams
2014	(Mexico) Tigres UANL

National team
2014	Mexico

Jorge Barajas (born 7 May 1991) is a Mexican male volleyball player. He was part of the Mexico men's national volleyball team at the 2014 FIVB Volleyball Men's World Championship in Poland. The most recent club he played for was Bravos de Michoacán in 2019.

== Clubs ==
- Tigres UANL (2014)
- Panachaiki (2016–2017)
- Virtus Guanajuato (2016–2017)
- Pag volley (2017–2018)
- Eilabun (2018–2019)
- Bravos de Michoacán (2018–2019)
