= David Schweiner =

Czech beach volleyball player (born 1994)

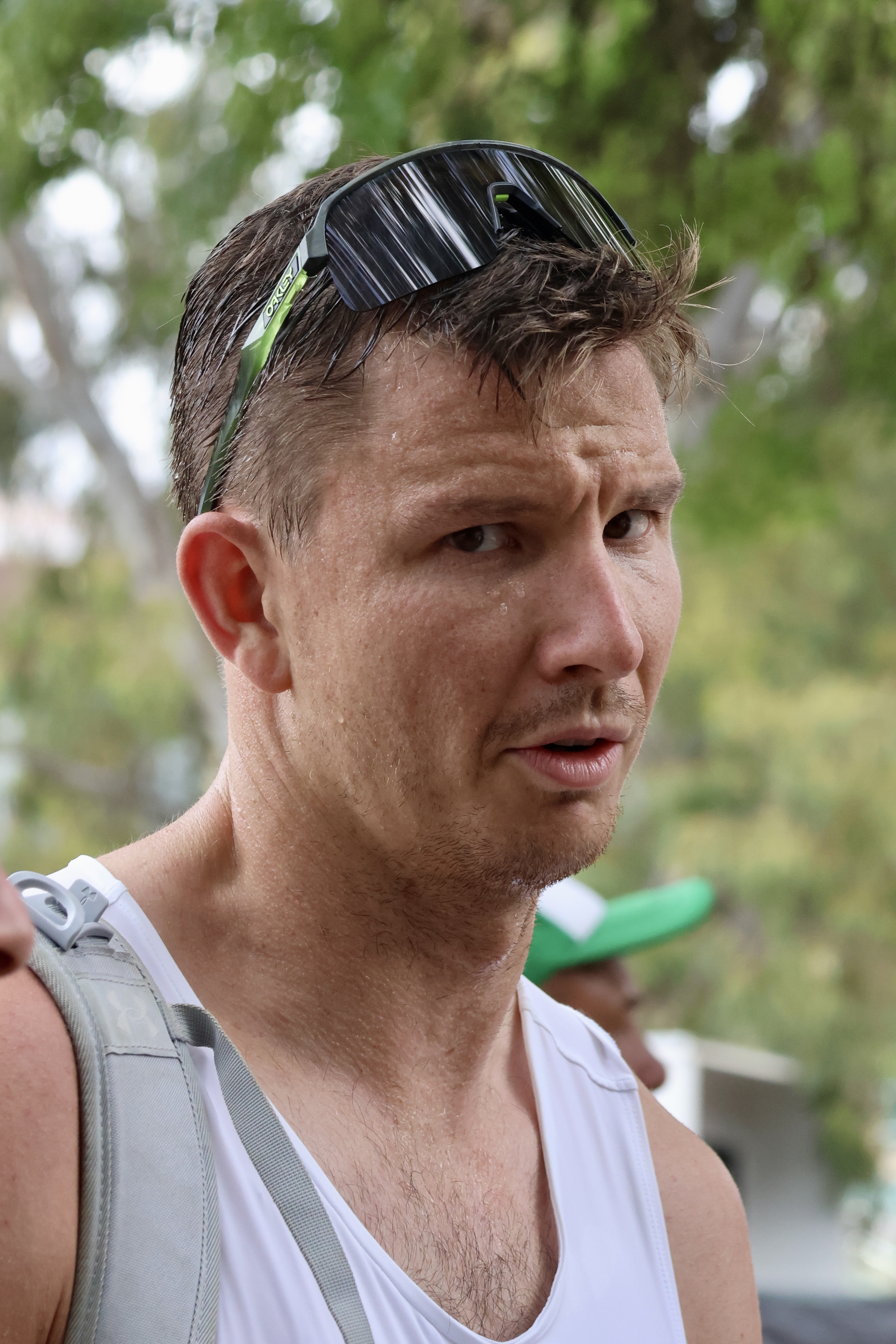
- Schweiner at the 2025 Beach Volleyball World Championships

Personal information
- Nationality: Czech
- Born: 1 June 1994 (age 32) Prague, Czech Republic
- Height: 2.00 m (6 ft 7 in)

Sport
- Sport: Beach volleyball
Medal record
Men's beach volleyball
Representing Czech Republic
World Championships
Gold medal – first place	2023 Mexico	Beach
European Championships
Silver medal – second place	2022 Munich	Beach

David Schweiner (Czech pronunciation: [ˈdavɪt ˈʃvajnɛr]; born 1 June 1994) is a Czech beach volleyball player. He competed in the 2020 Summer Olympics.
