= Michał Bryl =

Polish beach volleyball player (born 1994)

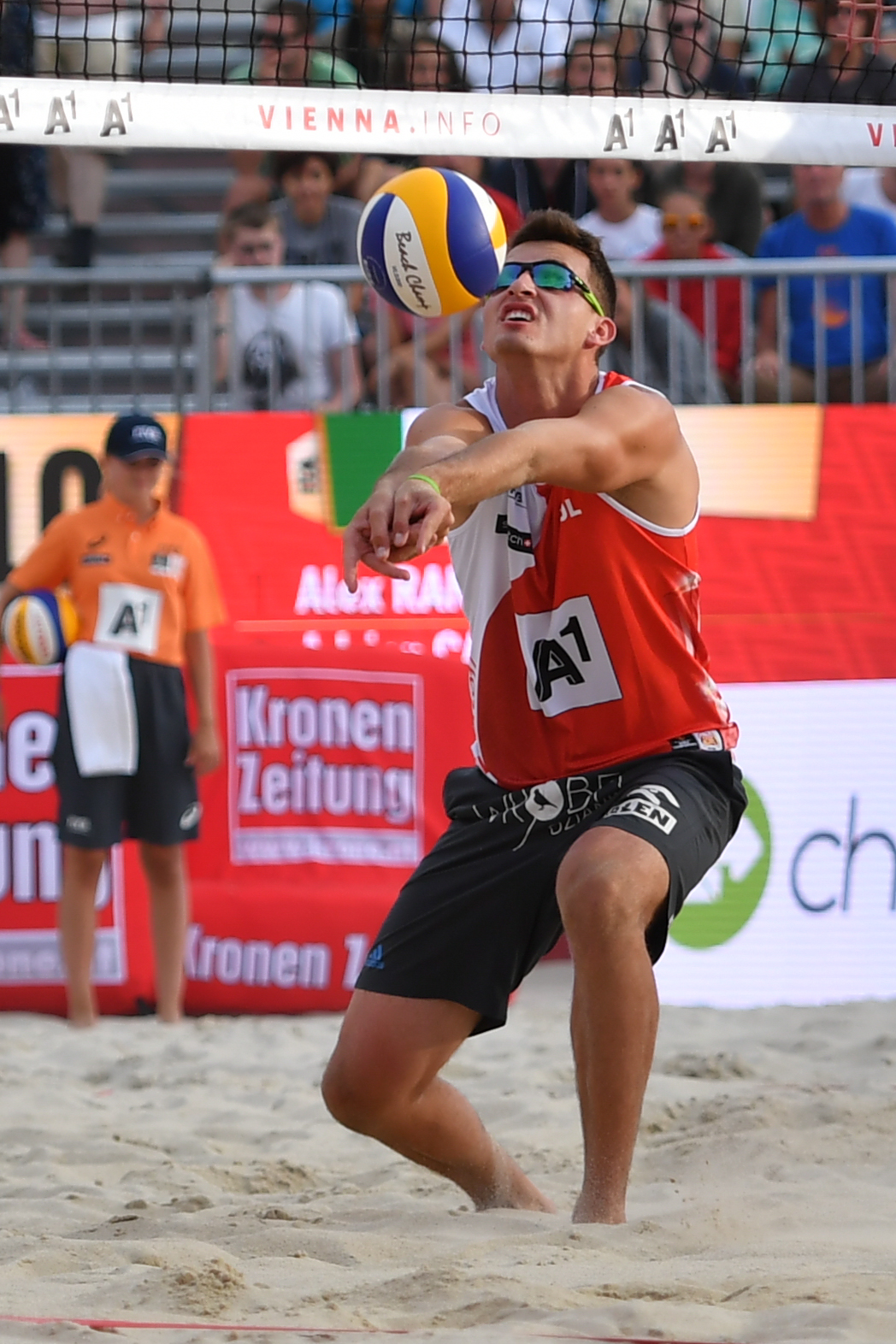
- Bryl in 2017

Personal information
- Born: 9 October 1994 (age 31) Łódź, Poland
- Height: 2.00 m (6 ft 7 in)

Sport
- Sport: Beach volleyball
Medal record
Men's beach volleyball
Representing Poland
World Championships
Bronze medal – third place	2023 Mexico	Beach

Michał Bryl (born 9 October 1994) is a Polish beach volleyball player. He competed in the 2020 Summer Olympics.
