= Andrew Benesh =

American beach volleyball player

Personal information
- Nickname: Andy
- Born: 14 March 1995 (age 31) Rancho Palos Verdes, California
- Height: 6 ft 8 in (203 cm)

Sport
- Sport: Beach volleyball
Medal record
Men's beach volleyball
Representing United States

Andrew Benesh (born 14 March 1995) is an American beach volleyball player. He competed in the 2024 Summer Olympics alongside his compatriot Miles Partain.
