= Theo Brunner =

American volleyball player

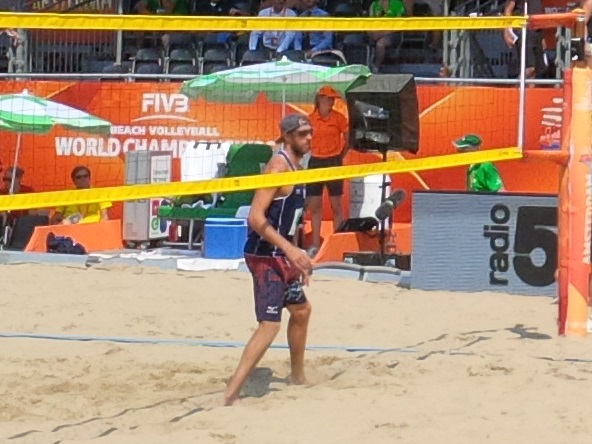
- Brunner at the 2015 Beach Volleyball World Championships

Personal information
- Full name: Theodore Allan Brunner
- Nationality: American
- Born: March 17, 1985 (age 41) Palo Alto, California, U.S.
- Home town: Ridgefield, Connecticut, U.S.
- Education: UC Santa Barbara Gauchos
- Height: 6 ft 7 in (201 cm)
- Weight: 201 lb (91 kg)
Beach volleyball information
Current teammate
- Years: Teammate
- 2018–: John Hyden
Previous teammates
- Years: Teammate
- 2006–2007 2008 2009 2010 2013 2014–2016 2017: B. Brockman; Andy McGuire, P. Silva; Aaron Mansfield, M. Heagy, D. Olson; Jon Mesko, A. Mansfield; David McKienzie, Nick Lucena, Todd Rogers, Casey Jennings; Todd Rogers, John Mayer; Casey Patterson
Medal record
Representing the United States
Men's beach volleyball
World Tour
Gold medal – first place	2021 Rubavu	Beach
Gold medal – first place	2023 Espinho	Beach
Gold medal – first place	2024 Guadalajara	Beach
Silver medal – second place	2019 Kuala Lumpur	Beach
Silver medal – second place	2023 Haikou	Beach
Bronze medal – third place	2014 Long Beach	Beach
Bronze medal – third place	2015 St. Petersburg	Beach
Men's volleyball
Pan-American Cup
Gold medal – first place	2010 San Juan

Theodore Allan Brunner (born March 17, 1985) is an American professional beach volleyball player who is a member of the United States men's national A2 beach volleyball team and has also featured for the United States men's national A2 volleyball team.

== Playing career ==
=== Youth and collegiate ===
Brunner was born in Palo Alto, California, but raised in Ridgefield, Connecticut where he attended Ridgefield High School and played for the school team. After graduation, he enrolled at the University of California, Santa Barbara.

In college, Brunner competed with the UC Santa Barbara Gauchos men's indoor volleyball team. Despite redshirting his freshman year in 2004, Brunner quickly became a key player for the Gauchos. In 2007, Brunner was named an AVCA First Team All American along with UCSB teammate Evan Patak. He was named co-captain of the team in 2008.

=== Professional ===
==== Rough start ====
Brunner's first taste of professional beach volleyball was in the 2006 Manhattan Beach Open, which he participated in with UCSB teammate Ben Brockman. They lost by forfeit in their first qualifying match. The duo participated in the 2007 version, losing 2 sets to 1 in their first qualifying match. 2008 saw the first of Brunner's partner swaps, participating in May's Huntington Beach Open with another UCSB teammate, Andy McGuire. The Brunner/McGuire combination won their first qualifying match before falling in their second. July's Long Beach Open saw Brunner pair with Phil Silva.

==== Aaron Mansfield era ====
He competed in seven events in 2009, nearly doubling the number of events he previously competed in. He began 2009 with yet another UCSB teammate, Aaron Mansfield, before competing with Matt Heagy and Derek Olson, then ultimately reverting to Mansfield to complete the season. Brunner advanced for the first time out of the qualifying rounds and into the Winners Bracket with Olsen in July's Coney Island Open, falling to John Mayer and Jeff Nygaard. It marked the first time in Brunner's career that he finished in the money — $240.

2010 saw Mansfield and Brunner partner for two of the three tournaments Brunner participated in. The lone exception was the first tournament that Brunner participated in in 2010, the Virginia Beach Open, which he paired up with Jon Mesko. Unfortunately, the Association of Volleyball Professionals cancelled the remainder of the season right before the 2010 Manhattan Beach Open due to financial difficulty.

==== Return to indoor volleyball ====
In the 2009 beach volleyball off season, Brunner returned indoor volleyball. He (stylized in Greek as Θίοντορ Μπρούνερ) signed professional terms with P.A.O.K. Thessaloniki V.C. and was presented in September 2009, after a delay with his visa. He was named to the World All-Stars team, played on September 28, 2009, for the A1 Ethniki Volleyball league.

Brunner left Greece to join Italian-side Marmi Lanza Verona of the Serie A1 in June 2010 and was presented as a player on September 10, 2010. He spent the season with them before moving to CMC Ravenna in August 2011.

He signed with German club Generali Haching in June 2012. In September 2012 it was announced that after a medical checkup, it was discovered that Brunner had a heart problem and he left the team. His former club, Marmi Lanza Verona, issued a statement saying that they found no issues when he was a player for their team.

==== Back to the beach with Nick Lucena ====
After leaving Generali Haching in late 2012, Brunner signed up with partner David McKienzie, a US National Team player, for National Volleyball League's Texas Championships in Dallas, Texas. The partnership lasted just for this tournament.

2013 also marked the rebirth of the Association of Volleyball Professionals tour, which Brunner partnered with Nick Lucena to compete in. The duo proved fruitful as they achieved top-five finishes in all but one of the seven tournaments they entered. The Brunner/Lucena duo also produced Brunner's first professional tournament win in the 2013 AVP Championships at Huntington Beach on October 20, 2013. He was named the AVP Men’s Best Blocker at the conclusion of the 2013 season.

In addition to the NVL and AVP tour dates, Brunner participated in three NORCECA Beach Volleyball Circuit with Lucena, winning once as well as two 2013 FIVB Beach Volleyball World Tour dates with Todd Rogers and Casey Jennings.

==== Todd Rogers era ====
In 2014, Brunner and fellow UC Santa Barbara alum Todd Rogers paired up on a more permanent basis after having played together in 2013. Brunner played all but one tournament with him (playing with John Mayer in the 2014 FIVB Beach Volleyball World Tour São Paulo Grand Slam). He finished all but five matches with Rogers in fifth place or better.

==== Chaim Schalk and Trevor Crabb ====
In 2023, Brunner, who was named AVP's Blocker of the Year, teamed up with Trevor Crabb after ending his partnership with Chaim Schalk, who paired up with Tri Bourne, who was Trevor Crabb's former partner.

In 2024, Brunner-Crabb team won the AVP Manhattan Beach Open, defeating 2024 Olympians Andrew Benesh and Miles Partain. This was Brunner's first Manhattan Beach Open victory.

=== International ===
Brunner, despite focusing the majority of his post-collegiate career on beach volleyball, played with the United States men's national A2 volleyball team for the 2010 Men's Pan-American Volleyball Cup and won a gold medal.
