= Miles Partain =

American beach volleyball player

Personal information
- Born: 18 December 2001 (age 24) Pacific Palisades, Los Angeles, California
- Height: 6 ft 2 in (188 cm)

Sport
- Sport: Beach volleyball
- College team: UCLA
Medal record
Men's beach volleyball
Representing United States

Miles Partain (born 18 December 2001) is an American beach volleyball player. He competed in the 2024 Summer Olympics alongside his compatriot Andrew Benesh.
