= The Gambia at the 2022 Commonwealth Games =

- Flag of the Gambia
- CG code: GAM
- CGA: The Gambia National Olympic Committee
- Website: gambianoc.gm

in Birmingham, England 28 July 2022 – 8 August 2022
- Competitors: 14 (12 men and 2 women) in 6 sports
- Flag bearers: Modou Gamo; Wurrie Njadoe
- Medals Ranked =35th: Gold 0 Silver 1 Bronze 0 Total 1

Commonwealth Games appearances (overview)
- 1970; 1974; 1978; 1982; 1986; 1990; 1994; 1998; 2002; 2006; 2010; 2014; 2018; 2022; 2026; 2030

The Gambia competed at the 2022 Commonwealth Games in Birmingham, England between 28 July and 8 August 2022. It was The Gambia's twelfth appearance at the Games.

Modou Gamo and Wurrie Njadoe were the country's opening ceremony flagbearers.

On 2 August, judoka Faye Njie won the country's first Commonwealth Games silver medal and second Commonwealth medal ever (the first being a bronze medal at the 1970 Commonwealth Games).

== Medalists ==
| Medal | Name | Sport | Event | Date |
|---|---|---|---|---|
| Silver | Faye Njie | Judo | Men's 73 kg | 2 August |

== Competitors ==
The following is the list of number of competitors participating at the Games per sport/discipline.

| Sport | Men | Women | Total |
|---|---|---|---|
| Athletics | 4 | 2 | 6 |
| Beach volleyball | 2 | 0 | 2 |
| Boxing | 1 | 0 | 1 |
| Judo | 2 | 0 | 2 |
| Para powerlifting | 1 | 0 | 1 |
| Swimming | 2 | 0 | 2 |
| Total | 12 | 2 | 14 |

== Athletics ==
Men
Track and road events

| Athlete | Event | Heat | | Semifinal | | Final | |
| Athlete | Event | Result | Rank | Result | Rank | Result | Rank |
|---|---|---|---|---|---|---|---|
| Sengan Jobe | 200 m | 21.53 | 5 | did not advance | | | |
| Alieu Joof | 200 m | 21.49 | 3 | did not advance | | | |
| Adama Jammeh | 200 m | 21.72 | 4 | did not advance | | | |
| Sengan Jobe; Alieu Joof; Ebrahima Camara; Adama Jammeh | 4 × 100 m relay | 39.77 | 3 Q | —N/a | | 40.18 | 6 |

Women
Track and road events

| Athlete | Event | Heat | | Semifinal | | Final | |
| Athlete | Event | Result | Rank | Result | Rank | Result | Rank |
|---|---|---|---|---|---|---|---|
| Wurrie Njadoe | 100 m | 11.50 | 4 | did not advance | | | |
| Gina Bass | 200 m | 22.87 | 2 Q | 23.10 | 3 q | 23.13 | 5 |
| Wurrie Njadoe | 200 m | 24.12 | 4 q | 23.95 | 7 | did not advance | |

== Beach volleyball ==
On 28 March 2022, The Gambia guaranteed qualification for the men's tournament by winning the African Qualifier in Accra, Ghana. The FIVB later confirmed they ultimately qualified directly via the World Rankings (for performances between 16 April 2018 and 31 March 2022).

Two players were selected as of 24 May 2022.

| Athlete | Event | Preliminary Round | | | | Quarterfinals | Semifinals | Finals | Rank |
| Athlete | Event | Opposition Score | Opposition Score | Opposition Score | Rank | Opposition Score | Opposition Score | Opposition Score | Rank |
|---|---|---|---|---|---|---|---|---|---|
| Sainey Jawo; Mbye Babou Jarra | Men's tournament | Hodge / Seabrookes (SKN); W 2 - 0 | Yapa / Rashmika (SRI); W 2 - 1 | Dearing / Schacther (CAN); L 1 - 2 | 2 Q | Bello / Bello (ENG); L 1 - 2 | did not advance | | |

=== Men's tournament ===
Group A

| Pos | Team | Pld | W | L | Pts | SW | SL | SR | SPW | SPL | SPR | Qualification |
|---|---|---|---|---|---|---|---|---|---|---|---|---|
| 1 | Dearing – Schachter (CAN) | 3 | 3 | 0 | 6 | 6 | 1 | 6.000 | 137 | 96 | 1.427 | Quarterfinals |
| 2 | Jawo – Jarra (GAM) | 3 | 2 | 1 | 5 | 5 | 3 | 1.667 | 149 | 118 | 1.263 | Quarterfinals |
| 3 | Yapa – Rashmika (SRI) | 3 | 1 | 2 | 4 | 3 | 4 | 0.750 | 111 | 119 | 0.933 | Ranking of third-placed teams |
| 4 | Hodge – Seabrookes (SKN) | 3 | 0 | 3 | 3 | 0 | 6 | 0.000 | 62 | 126 | 0.492 | |

Source: birmingham2022.com

| 31 July 2022; 19:00 | Jawo – Jarra (GAM) | 2–0 | Hodge – Seabrookes (SKN) | Smithfield |
| 31 July 2022; 19:00 | (21–14, 21–7); Report | | | Smithfield |

| 2 August 2022; 19:00 | Jawo – Jarra (GAM) | 2–1 | Yapa – Rashmika (SRI) | Smithfield |
| 2 August 2022; 19:00 | (21–14, 19–21, 15–9); Report | | | Smithfield |

| 4 August 2022; 14:30 | Dearing – Schachter (CAN) | 2–1 | Jawo – Jarra (GAM) | Smithfield |
| 4 August 2022; 14:30 | (17–21, 21–19, 15–12); Report | | | Smithfield |

Quarterfinals

| 5 August 2022; 16:30 | Bello – Bello (ENG) | 2–1 | Jawo – Jarra (GAM) | Smithfield |
| 5 August 2022; 16:30 | (21–16, 20–22, 15–12); Report | | | Smithfield |

== Boxing ==
Men

| Athlete | Event | Round of 32 | Round of 16 | Quarterfinals | Semifinals | Final | |
| Athlete | Event | Opposition Result | Opposition Result | Opposition Result | Opposition Result | Opposition Result | Rank |
|---|---|---|---|---|---|---|---|
| Foday Badjie | Middleweight | Bye | Bongco (RSA); L 0 - 5 | did not advance | | | |

== Judo ==
Two judoka were selected as of 24 May 2022.

Men

| Athlete | Event | Round of 16 | Quarterfinals | Semifinals | Repechage | Final/BM | |
| Athlete | Event | Opposition Result | Opposition Result | Opposition Result | Opposition Result | Opposition Result | Rank |
|---|---|---|---|---|---|---|---|
| Faye Njie | -73 kg | Mwango (ZAM); W 10 - 00 | Repiyallage (SRI); W 10 - 00 | Matsoukatov (CYP); W PEN | —N/a | Powell (ENG); L 00 - 10 | 2nd place, silver medalist(s) |
| Abdourahman Ceesay | -81 kg | Kosam (NRU); L DNS | did not advance | | | | |

== Para powerlifting ==
As of 4 May 2022, The Gambia qualified one powerlifter.

| Athlete | Event | Result | Rank |
|---|---|---|---|
| Modou Gamo | Men's heavyweight | 91.3 | 7 |

== Swimming ==
Men

| Athlete | Event | Heat | | Semifinal | | Final | |
| Athlete | Event | Time | Rank | Time | Rank | Time | Rank |
|---|---|---|---|---|---|---|---|
| Ebrima Buaro | 50 m freestyle | 27.95 | 70 | did not advance | | | |
| Ebrima Buaro | 100 m freestyle | 1:05.15 | 68 | did not advance | | | |
| Omar Darboe | 100 m freestyle | 1:06.44 | 69 | did not advance | | | |
| Omar Darboe | 200 m breaststroke | 3:03.86 | 19 | —N/a | | did not advance | |
