= Beach volleyball at the 2022 Commonwealth Games =

- Venue: Smithfield
- Dates: 30 July – 7 August 2022
- Competitors: 48 from 18 nations

Beach volleyball is among the sports contested at the 2022 Commonwealth Games, to be held in Birmingham, England. This will be the second staging of beach volleyball at the Commonwealth Games since its debut four years prior, and therefore the first staging within England specifically.

Both tournaments are scheduled to take place between 30 July and 7 August 2022.

== Schedule ==
The competition schedule is as follows:

G	Group stage	¼	Quarter-finals	½	Semi-finals	B	Bronze medal match	F	Gold medal match

Date Event	Sat 30		Sun 31		Mon 1		Tue 2		Wed 3		Thu 4		Fri 5			Sat 6		Sun 7			
Session →	A	E	A	E	A	E	A	E	A	E	A	E	M	A	E	A	E	A		E	
Men	G		G		G		G		G		G		¼			½		B	F		
Women	G		G		G		G		G		G			¼			½			B	F

Full match schedules were released on 1 July 2022.

== Venue ==
The competitions will be held in a temporary Games-time venue at the brownfield site in Smithfield, named after the market that once stood in its place.

The venue will also play host to 3x3 basketball, 3x3 wheelchair basketball, and the start of the marathon; after the Games, it will be dismantled and the site subject to a redevelopment scheme.

== Medal summary ==
=== Medal table ===
* Host nation (England)

Rank	CGA	Gold	Silver	Bronze	Total
1	Australia	1	1	0	2
1	Canada	1	1	0	2
3	England*	0	0	1	1
3	Vanuatu	0	0	1	1
Totals (4 entries)		2	2	2	6

=== Medallists ===
Event	Gold	Silver	Bronze
Men	Australia; Paul Burnett; Chris McHugh	Canada; Daniel Dearing; Sam Schachter	England; Javier Bello; Joaquin Bello
Women	Canada; Melissa Humana-Paredes; Sarah Pavan	Australia; Mariafe Artacho del Solar; Taliqua Clancy	Vanuatu; Miller Pata; Sherysyn Toko

== Qualification ==
Twelve nations qualify for each tournament at the 2022 Commonwealth Games:

- The host nation.
- The top five Commonwealth nations in the FIVB Beach Volleyball World Rankings between 16 April 2018 and 31 March 2022, excluding the host nation.
- The highest-placed nation not yet qualified from each of the five regional qualifiers (four of six FIVB regions, plus the Oceania CGF region).
- One nation not already qualified receives a CGF/FIVB Bipartite Invitation.

=== Summary ===
CGA	Men	Women	Athletes
Australia	Yes	Yes	4
Canada	Yes	Yes	4
Cyprus	Yes	Yes	4
England	Yes	Yes	4
Ghana		Yes	2
Kenya		Yes	2
Maldives	Yes		2
New Zealand	Yes	Yes	4
Rwanda	Yes		2
Saint Kitts and Nevis	Yes		2
Scotland		Yes	2
Solomon Islands		Yes	2
South Africa	Yes		2
Sri Lanka	Yes	Yes	4
The Gambia	Yes		2
Trinidad and Tobago		Yes	2
Tuvalu	Yes		2
Vanuatu		Yes	2
TOTAL: 18 CGAs	12	12	48

=== Men ===
Means of qualification	Date	Location	Quotas	Qualified
Host Nation	—	—	1	England
FIVB Beach Volleyball World Rankings	16 April 2018 – 31 March 2022	—	5	Canada; Australia; New Zealand; The Gambia; Rwanda
Oceania Ranking (Note: The men's continental qualifiers for the Americas / Caribbean and Oceania were abandoned due to the COVID-19 pandemic, so the associated quota places were awarded to the highest-ranked nations from those regions.)	16 April 2018 – 31 March 2022	—	1	Tuvalu
Americas / Caribbean Ranking	16 April 2018 – 31 March 2022	—	1	Saint Kitts and Nevis
European Qualifier	24–26 September 2021	(Scotland) Edinburgh	1	Cyprus
Asian Qualifier	18–19 March 2022	(Sri Lanka) Negombo	1	Sri Lanka
African Qualifier	25–28 March 2022	(Ghana) Accra	1	South Africa
Bipartite Invitation	21 April 2022	—	1	Maldives
TOTAL			12	

=== Women ===
Means of qualification	Date	Location	Quotas	Qualified
Host Nation	—	—	1	England
FIVB Beach Volleyball World Rankings	16 April 2018 – 31 March 2022	—	5	Canada; Australia; Vanuatu; New Zealand; Cyprus
Oceania Ranking (Note: The women's continental qualifiers for the Americas / Caribbean and Oceania were abandoned due to the COVID-19 pandemic, so the associated quota places were awarded to the highest-ranked nations from those regions.)	16 April 2018 – 31 March 2022	—	1	Solomon Islands
Americas / Caribbean Ranking	16 April 2018 – 31 March 2022	—	1	Trinidad and Tobago
European Qualifier	24–26 September 2021	(Scotland) Edinburgh	1	Scotland
Asian Qualifier	18–19 March 2022	(Sri Lanka) Negombo	1	Sri Lanka
African Qualifier	25–28 March 2022	(Ghana) Accra	1	Ghana
Bipartite Invitation	21 April 2022	—	1	Kenya
TOTAL			12	

;Scheduling issues
