= Rwanda at the 2022 Commonwealth Games =

- Flag of Rwanda
- CG code: RWA
- CGA: Rwanda National Olympic and Sports Committee
- Website: olympicrwanda.org

in Birmingham, England 28 July 2022 – 8 August 2022
- Competitors: 16 (10 men and 6 women) in 4 sports
- Flag bearers (opening): Ntagengwa Olivier; Diane Ingabire
- Flag bearer (closing): TBD
- Medals: Gold 0 Silver 0 Bronze 0 Total 0

Commonwealth Games appearances (overview)
- 2010; 2014; 2018; 2022; 2026; 2030

Rwanda competed at the 2022 Commonwealth Games in Birmingham, England between 28 July and 8 August 2022. It was Rwanda's fourth appearance at the Games.

Ntagengwa Olivier and Diane Ingabire were the country's flagbearers during the opening ceremony.

== Competitors ==
Rwanda received a quota of 20 open allocation slots from Commonwealth Sport, of which they filled 15. This quota is used to determine the overall team in sports lacking a qualifying system.

The following is the list of number of competitors participating at the Games per sport/discipline.

Sport	Men	Women	Total
Athletics	1	3	4
Beach volleyball	2	0	2
Cycling	5	3	8
Swimming	2	0	2
Total	10	6	16

== Athletics ==
A squad of four athletes was selected as of 10 July 2022.

Men
Track and road events

Athlete	Event	Final	
Athlete	Event	Result	Rank
Yves Nimubona	5000 m	13:20.20	5

Women
Track and road events

Athlete	Event	Heat		Final	
Athlete	Event	Result	Rank	Result	Rank
Claire Uwitonze	1500 m	4:24.07	8	did not advance	
Emeline Imanizabayo	5000 m	—N/a		15:37.87	14
Celine Iranzi	10,000 m	—N/a		32:48.60	11

== Beach volleyball ==
By virtue of their position in the extended FIVB Beach Volleyball World Rankings (based on performances between 16 April 2018 and 31 March 2022), Rwanda qualified for the men's tournament. Two players were selected as of 19 July 2022.

Athlete	Event	Preliminary Round				Quarterfinals	Semifinals	Finals	Rank
Athlete	Event	Opposition Score	Opposition Score	Opposition Score	Rank	Opposition Score	Opposition Score	Opposition Score	Rank
Olivier Ntagengwa; Venuste Gatsinze	Men's tournament	Leo Williams / Goldschmidt (RSA); W 2 - 0	Ismail / Naseem (MDV); W 2 - 1	Burnett / McHugh (AUS); L 0 - 2	2 Q	O'Dea / Fuller (NZL); W 2 - 0	Burnett / McHugh (AUS); L 0 - 2	Bronze medal match Bello / Bello (ENG); L 0 - 2	4

=== Men's tournament ===
Group B

Pos	Team	Pld	W	L	Pts	SW	SL	SR	SPW	SPL	SPR	Qualification
1	Burnett – McHugh (AUS)	3	3	0	6	6	0	MAX	126	88	1.432	Quarterfinals
2	Ntagengwa – Gatsinze (RWA)	3	2	1	5	4	3	1.333	127	128	0.992	Quarterfinals
3	Williams – Goldschmidt (RSA)	3	1	2	4	2	5	0.400	109	132	0.826	Ranking of third-placed teams
4	Ismail – Naseem (MDV)	3	0	3	3	2	6	0.333	129	143	0.902	

Source: birmingham2022.com

Qualified for the Quarterfinals

30 July 2022; 14:30	Ntagengwa – Gatsinze (RWA)	2–0	Williams – Goldschmidt (RSA)	Smithfield
30 July 2022; 14:30	(21–19, 21–16); Report			Smithfield

1 August 2022; 19:00	Ntagengwa – Gatsinze (RWA)	2–1	Ismail – Naseem (MDV)	Smithfield
1 August 2022; 19:00	(21–16, 14–21, 16–14); Report			Smithfield

3 August 2022; 14:30	Burnett – McHugh (AUS)	2–0	Ntagengwa – Gatsinze (RWA)	Smithfield
3 August 2022; 14:30	(21–16, 21–18); Report			Smithfield

Quarterfinals

5 August 2022; 11:00	O'Dea – Fuller (NZL)	0–2	Ntagengwa – Gatsinze (RWA)	Smithfield
5 August 2022; 11:00	(18–21, 19–21); Report			Smithfield

Semifinals

6 August 2022; 15:00	Ntagengwa – Gatsinze (RWA)	0–2	Burnett – McHugh (AUS)	Smithfield
6 August 2022; 15:00	(18–21, 14–21); Report			Smithfield

Bronze medal match

7 August 2022; 15:00	Bello – Bello (ENG)	2–0	Ntagengwa – Gatsinze (RWA)	Smithfield
7 August 2022; 15:00	(21–11, 21–12); Report			Smithfield

== Cycling ==
Following the National Road Championships, a squad of eight cyclists was selected as of 5 July 2022. Moise Mugisha, who was unable to take part in the championships after being hit in a car accident, is also listed as of 10 July 2022.

=== Road ===
Men

Athlete	Event	Time	Rank
Eric Manizabayo	Road race	3:37:15	54
Moise Mugisha	Road race	3:37:08	36
Samuel Mugisha	Road race	DNF	
Eric Muhoza	Road race	3:37:08	33
Byiza Renus Uhiriwe	Road race	3:37:08	23
Moise Mugisha	Time trial	51:56.70	17
Byiza Renus Uhiriwe	Time trial	53:52.62	27

Women

Athlete	Event	Time	Rank
Diane Ingabire	Road race	DNF	
Josiane Mukashma	Road race	DNF	
Jacqueline Tuyishime	Road race	DNF	
Diane Ingabire	Time trial	47:39.04	25
Jacqueline Tuyishime	Time trial	48:04.33	26

== Swimming ==
A squad of two swimmers was selected as of 10 July 2022.

Men

Athlete	Event	Heat		Semifinal		Final	
Athlete	Event	Time	Rank	Time	Rank	Time	Rank
Eloi Maniraguha	50 m freestyle	25.15	54	did not advance			
Eloi Maniraguha	100 m freestyle	57.79	63	did not advance			
Isihaka Isihaka	50 m butterfly	26.84	46	did not advance			
Isihaka Isihaka	100 m butterfly	1:00.95	44	did not advance			
