= Saint Kitts and Nevis at the 2022 Commonwealth Games =

- Flag of Saint Kitts and Nevis
- CG code: SKN
- CGA: Saint Kitts and Nevis Olympic Committee
- Website: sknoc.org

in Birmingham, England 28 July 2022 – 8 August 2022
- Competitors: 6 (5 men and 1 woman) in 2 sports
- Flag bearers: St. Clair Hodge & Amya Clarke
- Medals: Gold 0 Silver 0 Bronze 0 Total 0

Commonwealth Games appearances (overview)
- 1990; 1994; 1998; 2002; 2006; 2010; 2014; 2018; 2022; 2026; 2030

Other related appearances
- Saint Christopher-Nevis-Anguilla (1978)

Saint Kitts and Nevis was represented at the 2022 Commonwealth Games in Birmingham, England, United Kingdom by the Saint Kitts and Nevis Olympic Committee.

In total, six athletes including five men and one woman represented Saint Kitts and Nevis in two different sports including athletics and beach volleyball.

Beach volleyball athlete St. Clair Hodge and sprinter Amya Clarke were the country's flagbearers during the opening ceremony.

== Competitors ==
In total, six athletes represented Saint Kitts and Nevis at the 2022 Commonwealth Games in Birmingham, England, United Kingdom across two different sports.

| Sport | Men | Women | Total |
|---|---|---|---|
| Athletics | 3 | 1 | 4 |
| Beach volleyball | 2 | 0 | 2 |
| Total | 5 | 1 | 6 |

== Athletics ==
In total, four Kittitian and Nevisian athletes participated in the athletics events – Nadale Buntin in the men's 100 m and the men's 200 m, Warren Hazel in the men's 200 m, Amya Clarke in the women's 100 m and Kizan David in the men's long jump.

The athletics events took place at Alexander Stadium in Perry Bar, Birmingham between 30 July and 7 August 2022.

The heats for the men's 100 m took place on 30 July 2022. Buntin finished third in his heat in a time of 10.37 seconds and advanced to the semi-finals. The semi-finals took place the following day. Buntin finished ninth in his semi-final in a time of 10.51 seconds and did not advance to the final.

The heats for the women's 100 m took place on 2 August 2022. Clark finished fifth in her heat in a time of 11.97 seconds and did not advance to the semi-finals.

The heats for the men's 200 m took place on 4 August 2022. Buntin finished third in his heat in a time of 21.22 seconds. Hazel finished third in his heat in a time of 21.17 seconds. Both advanced to the semi-finals. The semi-finals took place the following day. Buntin finished seventh in his semi-final in a time of 21.42 seconds. Hazel finished seventh in his semi-final in a time of 21.4 seconds. Neither advanced to the final.

Track and road events

| Athlete | Event | Heat | | Semifinal | | Final | |
| Athlete | Event | Result | Rank | Result | Rank | Result | Rank |
|---|---|---|---|---|---|---|---|
| Nadale Buntin | Men's 100 m | 10.37 | 3 q | 10.51 | 9 | did not advance | |
| Nadale Buntin | Men's 200 m | 21.22 | 3 q | 21.42 | 7 | did not advance | |
| Warren Hazel | Men's 200 m | 21.17 | 3 q | 21.40 | 7 | did not advance | |
| Amya Clarke | Women's 100 m | 11.97 | 5 | did not advance | | | |

The qualification round for the men's long jump took place on 2 August 2022. David's best attempt of 7 m was not enough to advance to the final.

Field events

| Athlete | Event | Qualification | | Final | |
| Athlete | Event | Distance | Rank | Distance | Rank |
|---|---|---|---|---|---|
| Kizan David | Men's long jump | 7.00 | 16 | did not advance | |

== Beach volleyball ==
In total, two Kittitian and Nevisian athletes participated in the beach volleyball events – St. Clair Hodge and Shawn Seabrookes in the men's competition.

The beach volleyball events took place at Smithfield, Birmingham between 30 July and 7 August 2022. Saint Kitts and Nevis qualified for the competition as the Caribbean representative.

Hodge and Seabrookes were eliminated in the preliminary round after losing all of their matches.

| Athletes | Event | Preliminary Round | | | | Quarterfinals | Semifinals | Final / BM | Rank |
| Athletes | Event | Opposition Score | Opposition Score | Opposition Score | Rank | Opposition Score | Opposition Score | Opposition Score | Rank |
|---|---|---|---|---|---|---|---|---|---|
| St. Clair Hodge; Shawn Seabrookes | Men's | Jawo / Babou Jarra (GAM); L 0–2 | Dearing / Schachter (CAN); L 0–2 | Yapa / Rashmika (SRI); L 0–2 | 4 | did not advance | | | |
