= Hendron =

Hendron is a surname:

- Hendron is a surname of the Scottish Clan Henderson

Hendron surnamed persons:

- Henry Hendron, English barrister
- Máire Hendron, Northern Irish politician
- Jim Hendron, Northern Irish politician
- Joe Hendron, Northern Irish politician
- Timothy Hendron, American spree shooter and mass murderer

Hendron named places:

- Hendron, Kentucky, United States
