= 2022 Commonwealth Games Parade of Nations =

During the Parade of Nations at the 2022 Commonwealth Games opening ceremony, held on 28 July 2022, athletes bearing the flags of their respective nations lead their national delegations as they paraded into Alexander Stadium in the host city of Birmingham, England. A total of 72 Commonwealth Games Associations entered into the stadium.

== Parade order ==
As per tradition, Australia (as the host of the last games) entered first, followed by the rest of the Oceania region. Following this all countries entered in alphabetical order within their respective region groups. After Oceania, countries from Africa, America, Asia, the Caribbean and lastly Europe entered. The host nation, England, entered last.

== Countries and flag bearers ==
Below is a list of parading countries and their announced flag bearer, in the same order as the parade. Names are given in the form officially designated by the CGF.

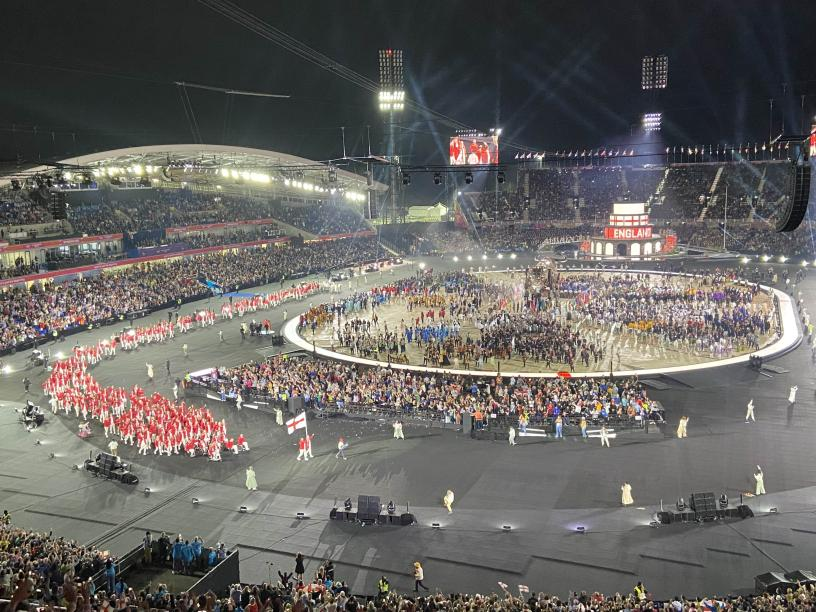
Delegates representing England at the Parade of Nations at the Opening Ceremony of the 2022 Commonwealth Games

| Order | Nation | Flag bearer | Sport | Ref. |
|---|---|---|---|---|
| 1 | Australia | Eddie Ockenden | Field hockey | |
| 1 | Australia | Rachael Grinham | Squash | |
| 2 | Cook Islands | Aidan Zittersteijn | Lawn bowls | |
| 2 | Cook Islands | Nooroa Mataio | Lawn bowls | |
| 3 | Fiji | Semesa Naiseruvati | Lawn bowls | |
| 3 | Fiji | Naibili Vatunisolo | Para-athletics | |
| 4 | Kiribati | | | |
| 5 | Nauru | Christon Amram | Boxing | |
| 5 | Nauru | Maximina Uepa | Weightlifting | |
| 6 | New Zealand | Tom Walsh | Athletics | |
| 6 | New Zealand | Joelle King | Squash | |
| 7 | Niue | Travis Tapatuetoa | Boxing | |
| 7 | Niue | Olivia Buckingham | Lawn bowls | |
| 8 | Norfolk Island | Tim Sheridan | Lawn bowls | |
| 8 | Norfolk Island | Shae Wilson | Lawn bowls | |
| 9 | Papua New Guinea | John Ume | Boxing | |
| 9 | Papua New Guinea | Rellie Kaputin | Athletics | |
| 10 | Samoa | | | |
| 11 | Solomon Islands | | | |
| 12 | Tonga | Sione Tupou | Rugby sevens | |
| 12 | Tonga | Kuinini Manumua | Weightlifting | |
| 13 | Tuvalu | | | |
| 14 | Vanuatu | Joe Mahit | Judo | |
| 14 | Vanuatu | Miller Pata | Beach volleyball | |
| 14 | Vanuatu | Ellie Enock | Para-athletics; Para powerlifting | |
| 15 | Botswana | Bayapo Ndori | Athletics | |
| 15 | Botswana | Aratwa Kasemang | Boxing | |
| 16 | Cameroon | Emmanuel Eseme | Athletics | |
| 16 | Cameroon | Ayuk Otay Arrey Sophina | Judo | |
| 17 | Eswatini | Sibusiso Matsenjwa | Athletics | |
| 17 | Eswatini | Hayley Hoy | Swimming | |
| 18 | The Gambia | Modou Gamo | Para powerlifting | |
| 18 | The Gambia | Wurrie Njadoe | Athletics | |
| 19 | Ghana | | | |
| 20 | Kenya | Ferdinand Omanyala | Athletics | |
| 20 | Kenya | Carolina Wanjira | 3x3 wheelchair basketball | |
| 21 | Lesotho | Lerato Sechele | Athletics | |
| 21 | Lesotho | Tumelo Makae | Cycling | |
| 22 | Malawi | | | |
| 23 | Mauritius | Merven Clair | Boxing | |
| 23 | Mauritius | Priscilla Morand | Judo | |
| 23 | Mauritius | Noemi Alphonse | Para-athletics | |
| 24 | Mozambique | Caio Lobo | Swimming | |
| 24 | Mozambique | Alcinda Panguana | Boxing | |
| 25 | Namibia | Ananias Shikongo | Para-athletics | |
| 25 | Namibia | Christine Mboma | Athletics | |
| 26 | Nigeria | Nnamdi Chinecherem | Athletics | |
| 26 | Nigeria | Folashade Oluwafemiayo | Para powerlifting | |
| 27 | Rwanda | Ntagengwa Olivier | Beach volleyball | |
| 27 | Rwanda | Diane Ingabire | Cycling | |
| 28 | Seychelles | Keddy Agnes | Boxing | |
| 28 | Seychelles | Natasha Chetty | Athletics | |
| 29 | Sierra Leone | Joshua Wyse | Swimming | |
| 29 | Sierra Leone | Hafsatu Kamara | Athletics | |
| 30 | South Africa | Christian Sadie | Para-swimming | |
| 30 | South Africa | Bongiwe Msomi | Netball | |
| 31 | Tanzania | | | |
| 32 | Uganda | Michael Wokorach | Rugby sevens | |
| 32 | Uganda | Peace Proscovia | Netball | |
| 33 | Zambia | Muzala Samukonga | Athletics | |
| 33 | Zambia | Margret Tembo | Boxing | |
| 34 | Bahamas | Izaak Bastian | Swimming | |
| 34 | Bahamas | Lilly Higgs | Swimming | |
| 35 | Belize | Shaun Gill | Athletics | |
| 35 | Belize | Alicia Thompson | Cycling | |
| 36 | Bermuda | Dage Minors | Athletics | |
| 36 | Bermuda | Emma Keane | Squash | |
| 37 | Canada | Josh Cassidy | Para-athletics | |
| 37 | Canada | Maude Charron | Weightlifting | |
| 38 | Falkland Islands | Doug Clark | Badminton | |
| 38 | Falkland Islands | Daphne Arthur-Almond | Lawn bowls | |
| 39 | Guyana | Keevin Allicock | Boxing | |
| 39 | Guyana | Aliyah Abrams | Athletics | |
| 40 | Saint Helena | | | |
| 41 | Bangladesh | Sura Krishna | Boxing | |
| 41 | Bangladesh | Mabia Aktar | Weightlifting | |
| 42 | Brunei | | | |
| 43 | India | Manpreet Singh | Field hockey | |
| 43 | India | P. V. Sindhu | Badminton | |
| 44 | Malaysia | Bonnie Bunyau Gustin | Para powerlifting | |
| 44 | Malaysia | Aifa Azman | Squash | |
| 45 | Maldives | Zayan Zaki | Badminton | |
| 45 | Maldives | Fathimath Nimal | Table tennis | |
| 46 | Pakistan | Muhammad Inam | Wrestling | |
| 46 | Pakistan | Bismah Maroof | Cricket | |
| 47 | Singapore | Terry Hee | Badminton | |
| 47 | Singapore | Nur Aini Yasli | Para powerlifting | |
| 48 | Sri Lanka | Indika Dissanayake | Weightlifting | |
| 48 | Sri Lanka | Chamari Athapaththu | Cricket | |
| 49 | Anguilla | Hasani Hennis | Cycling | |
| 49 | Anguilla | Tri-Tania Lowe | Athletics | |
| 50 | Antigua and Barbuda | | | |
| 51 | Barbados | Matthew Wright | Triathlon | |
| 51 | Barbados | Latonia Blackman | Netball | |
| 52 | British Virgin Islands | Rikkoi Brathwaite | Athletics | |
| 52 | British Virgin Islands | Beyoncé De Freitas | Athletics | |
| 53 | Cayman Islands | Rasheem Brown | Athletics | |
| 53 | Cayman Islands | Alison Jackson | Swimming | |
| 54 | Dominica | Dennick Luke | Athletics | |
| 54 | Dominica | Thea LaFond | Athletics | |
| 55 | Grenada | Kurt Felix | Athletics | |
| 55 | Grenada | Tilly Collymore | Swimming | |
| 56 | Jamaica | Oshane Edie | Rugby sevens | |
| 56 | Jamaica | Jhaniele Fowler | Netball | |
| 57 | Montserrat | Julius Morris | Athletics | |
| 58 | Saint Kitts and Nevis | St. Clair Hodge | Beach volleyball | |
| 58 | Saint Kitts and Nevis | Amya Clarke | Athletics | |
| 59 | Saint Lucia | Arthur Langelier | Boxing | |
| 59 | Saint Lucia | Julien Alfred | Athletics | |
| 60 | Saint Vincent and the Grenadines | Shane Cadogan | Swimming | |
| 60 | Saint Vincent and the Grenadines | Mikeisha Welcome | Athletics | |
| 61 | Trinidad and Tobago | Jereem Richards | Athletics | |
| 61 | Trinidad and Tobago | Michelle-Lee Ahye | Athletics | |
| 62 | Turks and Caicos Islands | Courtney Missick | Athletics | |
| 62 | Turks and Caicos Islands | Arleigha Hall | Swimming | |
| 63 | Cyprus | Marios Georgiou | Gymnastics | |
| 63 | Cyprus | Zoi Konstantopoulou | Beach volleyball | |
| 64 | Gibraltar | Derek Barbara | Cycling | |
| 64 | Gibraltar | Holly O'Shea | Weightlifting | |
| 65 | Guernsey | Marc Cox | Cycling | |
| 65 | Guernsey | Elena Johnson | Badminton | |
| 66 | Isle of Man | Mark Cavendish | Cycling | |
| 66 | Isle of Man | Laura Kinley | Swimming | |
| 67 | Jersey | Rhys Hidrio | Cycling | |
| 68 | Malta | Kijan Sultana | Squash | |
| 68 | Malta | Tenishia Thornton | Weightlifting | |
| 69 | Northern Ireland | Martin McHugh | Lawn bowls | |
| 69 | Northern Ireland | Michaela Walsh | Boxing | |
| 70 | Scotland | Micky Yule | Para powerlifting | |
| 70 | Scotland | Kirsty Gilmour | Badminton | |
| 71 | Wales | Geraint Thomas | Cycling | |
| 71 | Wales | Tesni Evans | Squash | |
| 72 | England | Jack Laugher | Diving | |
| 72 | England | Emily Campbell | Weightlifting | |
