= Gunnersbury Catholic School =

Location
- The Ride; Brentford, TW8 9LB; England; 51°29′35″N 0°18′52″W

Information
- Type: Voluntary aided school
- Motto: Ad Altiora (To Higher Things)
- Religious affiliation: Roman Catholic
- Established: 1932
- Founder: Fr William Roche
- Local authority: Hounslow
- Department for Education URN: 102545 Tables
- Ofsted: Reports
- Head: Kevin Burke
- Gender: Male (mixed 6th Form)
- Age: 11 to 18
- Enrolment: 1215
- Houses: Warren, Pole, Dunstan, Bourne, Roche, Newman
- Website: gunnersbury.com

Gunnersbury Catholic School is a Roman Catholic secondary school for boys with specialist Science College status. It is situated in Brentford, London. The school was founded in 1932 by Fr William Roche.

== History ==
In 1919, it opened as a Secondary School on Boston Park Road, Brentford. In 1932, it moved to Gunnersbury Avenue. Around 1938, extensions were made to the school after it received a bequeathal from Patrick Murphy who had died in 1934. In 1939, it received a grant and became a voluntary aided grammar school in 1944. In 1947, its junior school closed. In 1971, it became a comprehensive school. The lower school was on Gunnersbury Avenue and the upper school was moved to newly-constructed buildings on The Ride.

== Academic performance ==
In 2019, the school's GCSE results were above average compared to the national and local authority figures. 69% of pupils achieved Grade 5 or above in English & maths GCSEs. Pupils' progress was "well above average" and the school's Attainment 8 score was also above average. The proportion of pupils entering the English Baccalaureate was higher than average.

== Inspection judgements ==
As of 2023, the school's most recent Ofsted inspection was in Jan 2023 with the judgement of Outstanding.

== Notable former pupils ==
=== Gunnersbury Grammar School ===
- Richard O'Sullivan (b. 1944) - actor
- Andy Picheta (b. 1957) - director and producer of film and television, music videos and musical concerts
- Tony Slattery (1959–2025) - comedian, actor
- Nick Knowles (b. 1962) - presenter
- Kieran Campbell (b. 1979) - rugby player
- Henry Hendron (b. 1980) - barrister
- Marland Yarde (b. 1992) - rugby player
- Terry O’Neil (1938–2019) - photographer
- David Adeleye (b. 1996) - (Professional boxer)
- Javier Bello (b. 2000) - volleyball player
- Joaquin Bello (b. 2000) - volleyball player
- Axel Blake (b. 1988) - comedian, actor, social media personality
