= 2024 Volleyball World Beach Pro Tour =

International beach volleyball competition

Tournament details
- Host country: Various
- Dates: 28 February – 7 December 2024

The 2024 Volleyball World Beach Pro Tour is the third edition of the global elite professional beach volleyball circuit organized by the Fédération Internationale de Volleyball (FIVB) for the 2024 beach volleyball season. Since March 2022, the Tour comprises three tiers: Future, Challenge and Elite 16. The season ends with The Finals featuring the 10 best teams in the world.

The Volleyball World Beach Pro Tour was established by FIVB in October 2021, thus it replaced the former FIVB Beach Volleyball World Tour.

== Schedule ==
Key

World Championships
Beach Pro Tour Finals
Elite 16
Challenge
Future

=== Men ===
Tournament	Champions	Runners-up	Third place	Fourth place
Mollymook Future; Mollymook, Australia; US$5,000; 28 February–3 March 2024	Mark Nicolaidis (AUS); Izac Carracher (AUS); 21–18, 21–15	Paul Burnett (AUS); Jack Pearse (AUS)	Jordan Hoppe (USA); James Shaw (USA); 21–17, 16–21, 15–10	Banlue Nakprakhong (THA); Wachirawit Muadpha (THA)
Doha Elite 16; Doha, Qatar; US$150,000; 5–9 March 2024	Stefan Boermans (NED); Yorick de Groot (NED); 21–11, 21–10	David Åhman (SWE); Jonatan Hellvig (SWE)	Anders Mol (NOR); Christian Sørum (NOR); 21–18, 21–19	Nils Ehlers (GER); Clemens Wickler (GER)
Mount Manganui Future; Mount Maunganui, New Zealand; US$5,000; 7–10 March 2024	Jordan Hoppe (USA); James Shaw (USA); 18–21, 21–9, 15–9	Ben Hood (AUS); D'Artagnan Potts (AUS)	Cody Caldwell (USA); Jake Urrutia (USA); 21–19, 21–18	Thomas Reid (NZL); John McManaway (NZL)
Coolangatta Beach Future; Coolangatta, Australia; US$5,000; 21–24 March 2024	Jake MacNeil (CAN); Alexander Russell (CAN); 21–19, 21–14	Paul Burnett (AUS); Jack Pearse (AUS)	Thomas Reid (NZL); John McManaway (NZL) w/o	Netitorn Muneekul (THA); Wachirawit Muadpha (THA)
Recife Challenge; Recife, Brazil; US$75,000; 22–24 March 2024	Evandro Oliveira (BRA); Arthur Lanci (BRA); 21–15, 21–18	Noslen Díaz (CUB); Jorge Alayo (CUB)	Javier Bello (ENG); Joaquin Bello (ENG); 26–24, 15–21, 15–13	Miles Evans (USA); Chase Budinger (USA)
Saquarema Challenge; Saquarema, Brazil; US$75,000; 29–31 March 2024	George Wanderley (BRA); André Stein (BRA); 21–18, 17–21, 19–17	Noslen Díaz (CUB); Jorge Alayo (CUB)	Rémi Bassereau (FRA); Julien Lyneel (FRA); 21–15, 16–21, 15–12	Martin Ermacora (AUT); Philipp Waller (AUT)
Pirae Tahiti Future; Pirae, French Polynesia; US$5,000; 3–6 April 2024	Thomas Reid (NZL); John McManaway (NZL); 21–18, 21–18	Takumi Takahashi (JPN); Jumpei Ikeda (JPN)	Ivan Datsiuk (UKR); Ivan Likhatskyi (UKR); 21–18, 21–16	Håvard Solheim (NOR); Oscar Majak (NOR)
Guadalajara Challenge; Guadalajara, Mexico; US$75,000; 12–14 April 2024	Trevor Crabb (USA); Theo Brunner (USA); 12–21, 21–19, 15–12	Lukas Pfretzschner (GER); Sven Winter (GER)	Evandro Oliveira (BRA); Arthur Lanci (BRA); 21–13, 21–17	Noslen Díaz (CUB); Jorge Alayo (CUB)
Nuvali Future; Santa Rosa, Philippines; US$5,000; 11–14 April 2024	Kryštof Jan Oliva (CZE); Václav Kůrka (CZE); 16–21, 21–16, 15–13	James Buytrago (PHI); Rancel Varga (PHI)	Toms Emīls Liepa (LAT); Ernests Puškundzis (LAT); 22–20, 21–10	Hasan Hüseyin Mermer (TUR); Sacit Kurt (TUR)
Tepic Elite 16; Tepic, Mexico; US$150,000; 18–21 April 2024	David Åhman (SWE); Jonatan Hellvig (SWE); 21–17, 19–21, 15–10	George Wanderley (BRA); André Stein (BRA)	Noslen Díaz (CUB); Jorge Alayo (CUB); 21–18, 21–17	Nils Ehlers (GER); Clemens Wickler (GER)
Xiamen Challenge; Xiamen, China; US$75,000; 26–28 April 2024	Marco Grimalt (CHL); Esteban Grimalt (CHL); 17–21, 21–18, 15–9	Youssef Krou (FRA); Arnaud Gauthier-Rat (FRA)	Lukas Pfretzschner (GER); Sven Winter (GER); 15–21, 21–15, 15–13	Miles Evans (USA); Chase Budinger (USA)
Brasília Elite 16; Brasília, Brazil; US$150,000; 2–5 May 2024	Evandro Oliveira (BRA); Arthur Lanci (BRA); 17–21, 23–21, 15–9	Steven van de Velde (NED); Matthew Immers (NED)	George Wanderley (BRA); André Stein (BRA); 17–21, 21–17, 15–12	Nils Ehlers (GER); Clemens Wickler (GER)
Pingtan Future; Pingtan, China; US$5,000; 10–12 May 2024	Pedro Augusto Sousa (BRA); Henrique Camboim (BRA); 21–12, 13–21, 15–11	Jake MacNeil (CAN); Alexander Russell (CAN)	Jack Pearse (AUS); Paul Burnett (AUS); 21–12, 21–13	River Day (ISR); Idan Katriel (ISR)
Madrid Future; Madrid, Spain; US$5,000; 10–12 May 2024	Davis Krumins (ITA); Marco Caminati (ITA); 21–17, 21–17	Mads Møllgaard (DEN); Nicolai Overgaard (DEN)	Maciej Rudol (POL); Filip Lejawa (POL); 17–21, 21–17, 15–12	Elouan Chouikh-Barbez (FRA); Tom Altwies (FRA)
Wuhan Qingshan Future; Wuhan, China; US$5,000; 17–19 May 2024	Bintang Akbar (INA); Sofyan Rachman (INA); 16–21, 21–19, 15–11	Pedro Augusto Sousa (BRA); Henrique Camboim (BRA)	Jack Pearse (AUS); Paul Burnett (AUS); 21–16, 23–21	Jake MacNeil (CAN); Alexander Russell (CAN)
Cervia Future; Cervia, Italy; US$5,000; 17–19 May 2024	Gianluca Dal Corso (ITA); Marco Viscovich (ITA); 21–17, 21–11	Paul Henning (GER); Bennet Poniewaz (GER)	Calvin Ayé (FRA); Quincy Ayé (FRA); 24–22, 21–19	Yves Haussener (SUI); Julian Friedli (SUI)
Espinho Elite 16; Espinho, Portugal; US$150,000; 23–26 May 2024	David Åhman (SWE); Jonatan Hellvig (SWE); 21–16, 21–13	Nils Ehlers (GER); Clemens Wickler (GER)	George Wanderley (BRA); André Stein (BRA); 21–15, 30–28	Steven van de Velde (NED); Matthew Immers (NED)
Battipaglia Future; Battipaglia, Italy; US$5,000; 24–26 May 2024	Hagen Smith (USA); Logan Webber (USA); 21–18, 21–15	Gianluca Dal Corso (ITA); Marco Viscovich (ITA)	Jonas Sagstetter (GER); Maximilian Just (GER); 18–21, 21–14, 15–11	Davide Benzi (ITA); Carlo Bonifazi (ITA)
Warmia–Mazury Challenge; Stare Jabłonki, Poland; US$75,000; 31 May–2 June 2024	Ondřej Perušič (CZE); David Schweiner (CZE); 21–17, 17–21, 15–11	Jorge Alayo (CUB); Noslen Díaz (CUB)	Stefan Boermans (NED); Yorick de Groot (NED); 21–12, 21–10	Nicolás Capogrosso (ARG); Tomás Capogrosso (ARG)
Spiez Future; Spiez, Switzerland; US$5,000; 31 May–2 June 2024	Yves Haussener (SUI); Julian Friedli (SUI); 18–21, 21–19, 15–10	Quentin Métral (SUI); Jonathan Jordan (SUI)	Mirco Gerson (SUI); Luc Flückiger (SUI); 21–18, 21–15	Đorđe Klašnić (SRB); Marko Makarić (SRB)
Ostrava Elite 16; Ostrava, Czech Republic; US$150,000; 6–9 June 2024	David Åhman (SWE); Jonatan Hellvig (SWE); 21–19, 21–18	Stefan Boermans (NED); Yorick de Groot (NED)	Miles Partain (USA); Andrew Benesh (USA); 21–15, 21–14	Anders Mol (NOR); Christian Sørum (NOR)
Kraków Future; Kraków, Poland; US$5,000; 7–9 June 2024	Robin Sowa (GER); Maximilian Just (GER); 21–8, 21–13	Jakub Krzemiński (POL); Szymon Pietraszek (POL)	Louis Vandecaveye (BEL); Gilles Vandecaveye (BEL); 21–19, 19–21, 15–11	Manuel Alfieri (ITA); Tiziano Andreatta (ITA)
Sveti Vlas Future; Sveti Vlas, Bulgaria; US$5,000; 7–9 June 2024	Christoph Dressler (AUT); Maximilian Trummer (AUT); 21–18, 21–16	Mees Sengers (NED); Dirk Boehlé (NED)	Hagen Smith (USA); Logan Webber (USA); 21–15, 21–16	Florian Schnetzer (AUT); Lorenz Petutschnig (AUT)
Ios Island Future; Ios, Greece; US$5,000; 20–22 June 2024	Eylon Elazar (ISR); River Day (ISR); 14–21, 21–17, 15–9	Jonas Sagstetter (GER); Benedikt Sagstetter (GER)	Ardis Bedrītis (LAT); Arturs Rinkēvičs (LAT); 21–13, 21–16	Stavros Ntallas (GRE); Dimitrios Chatzinikolaou (GRE)
Geneva Future; Geneva, Switzerland; US$5,000; 20–23 June 2024	Arthur Canet (FRA); Téo Rotar (FRA); 21–17, 21–13	Quentin Métral (SUI); Jonathan Jordan (SUI)	Yves Haussener (SUI); Julian Friedli (SUI); 21–14, 21–15	Elouan Chouikh-Barbez (FRA); Tom Altwies (FRA)
Messina Future; Messina, Italy; US$5,000; 21–23 June 2024	Robin Sowa (GER); Maximilian Just (GER); 21–18, 18–21, 15–8	Mees Sengers (NED); Dirk Boehlé (NED)	Gianluca Dal Corso (ITA); Marco Viscovich (ITA); 21–16, 21–16	Davide Benzi (ITA); Carlo Bonifazi (ITA)
Baden Future; Baden bei Wien, Austria; US$5,000; 27–30 June 2024	Kristians Fokerots (LAT); Gustavs Auziņš (LAT); 21–19, 21–19	Tim Berger (AUT); Timo Hammarberg (AUT)	Laurenz Leitner (AUT); Philipp Waller (AUT); 21–15, 21–14	Solomon Bushby (AUS); Ben Hood (AUS)
Rakvere Future; Rakvere, Estonia; US$5,000; 4–6 July 2024	Jacob Hölting Nilsson (SWE); Elmer Andersson (SWE); 21–16, 21–18	Urmas Piik (EST); Dimitriy Korotkov (EST)	Robin Sowa (GER); Maximilian Just (GER) w/o	Kusti Nõlvak (EST); Mart Tiisaar (EST)
Gstaad Elite 16; Gstaad, Switzerland; US$150,000; 4–7 July 2024	David Åhman (SWE); Jonatan Hellvig (SWE); 21–18, 21–18	George Wanderley (BRA); André Stein (BRA)	Anders Mol (NOR); Christian Sørum (NOR); 20–22, 22–20, 28–26	Samuele Cottafava (ITA); Paolo Nicolai (ITA)
Vienna Elite 16; Vienna, Austria; US$150,000; 11–14 July 2024	Anders Mol (NOR); Christian Sørum (NOR); 25–23, 21–12	Michał Bryl (POL); Bartosz Łosiak (POL)	Marco Grimalt (CHL); Esteban Grimalt (CHL); 21–18, 21–16	Nils Ehlers (GER); Clemens Wickler (GER)
Leuven Future; Leuven, Belgium; US$5,000; 19–21 July 2024	Jakub Šépka (CZE); Jiří Sedlák (CZE); 21–15, 21–19	Kristians Fokerots (LAT); Gustavs Auziņš (LAT)	Tim Berger (AUT); Timo Hammarberg (AUT); 21–9, 21–17	Javier Huerta (ESP); Alejandro Huerta (ESP)
Brussels Future; Brussels, Belgium; US$5,000; 2–4 August 2024	Christoph Dressler (AUT); Tim Berger (AUT); 18–21, 21–19, 15–12	Eylon Elazar (ISR); Kevin Cuzmiciov (ISR)	Piotr Janiak (POL); Jędrzej Brożyniak (POL); 23–21, 21–16	Paul Pascariuc (AUT); Laurenz Leitner (AUT)
Hamburg Elite 16; Hamburg, Germany; US$150,000; 22–25 August 2024	Anders Mol (NOR); Christian Sørum (NOR); 21–15, 21–11	Pablo Herrera (ESP); Adrián Gavira (ESP)	Stefan Boermans (NED); Yorick de Groot (NED); 21–18, 21–13	Samuele Cottafava (ITA); Paolo Nicolai (ITA)
Brno Future; Brno, Czech Republic; US$5,000; 23–25 August 2024	Ondřej Perušič (CZE); David Schweiner (CZE); 19–21, 21–16, 15–7	Adam Waber (CZE); Matyáš Ježek (CZE)	Jacob Hölting Nilsson (SWE); Elmer Andersson (SWE); 21–19, 21–11	Javier Huerta (ESP); Alejandro Huerta (ESP)
Halifax Future; Halifax, Canada; US$5,000; 22–25 August 2024	Frederick Bialokoz (ENG); Issa Batrane (ENG); 21–14, 21–19	Steven Abrams (CAN); Jonathan Pickett (CAN)	Garrett Peterson (USA); Caleb Kwekel (USA); 21–17, 14–21, 15–11	Jake Urrutia (USA); James Drost (USA)
Corigliano-Rossano Future; Corigliano-Rossano, Italy; US$5,000; 30 August–1 September 2024	Gianluca Dal Corso (ITA); Marco Viscovich (ITA); 21–14, 22–20	Mihails Samoilovs (LAT); Arnis Reliņš (LAT)	Tobia Marchetto (ITA); Jakob Windisch (ITA); 24–22, 21–17	Ramiro Sancer (ARG); Julián Azaad (ARG)
Warsaw Future; Warsaw, Poland; US$5,000; 30 August–1 September 2024	Laurenz Leitner (AUT); Paul Pascariuc (AUT); 13–21, 21–15, 15–13	Stefan Andreasson (SWE); Anton Andersson (SWE)	Frederick Bialokoz (ENG); Issa Batrane (ENG); 21–16, 19–21, 15–12	Robert Juchnevič (LTU); Artūr Vasiljev (LTU)
Qidong Future; Qidong, China; US$5,000; 6–8 September 2024	Toms Emīls Liepa (LAT); Ernests Puškundzis (LAT); 21–19, 11–21, 15–12	Dunwinit Kaewsai (THA); Banlue Nakprakhong (THA)	Niklas Held (GER); Hennes Nissen (GER); 21–18, 21–13	Bence Tari (HUN); Ákos Veress (HUN)
Bujumbura Future; Bujumbura, Burundi; US$5,000; 12–14 September 2024	Kyan Vercauteren (BEL); Joppe van Langendonck (BEL); 21–18, 21–12	Boldizsár Borbély (HUN); Lukas Niemeier (HUN)	Malte Höppner (GER); Moritz Camp (GER); 23–21, 21–18	Danijel Pokeršnik (SLO); Nejc Zemljak (SLO)
Qingdao Future; Qingdao, China; US$5,000; 13–15 September 2024	Domonkos Dóczi (HUN); Bence Stréli (HUN); 23–25, 21–18, 18–16	Joshua Howat (AUS); Luke Ryan (AUS)	Netitorn Muneekul (THA); Poravid Taovato (THA); 21–14, 21–11	Wang Yanwei (CHN); Du Hongjun (CHN)
Balıkesir Future; Balıkesir, Turkey; US$5,000; 20–22 September 2024	Manuel Alfieri (ITA); Tiziano Andreatta (ITA); 21–19, 21–17	Enrico Rossi (ITA); Marco Caminati (ITA)	Even Stray Aas (NOR); Jo Sunde (NOR); 21–17, 21–15	Markus Mol (NOR); Adrian Mol (NOR)
João Pessoa Elite 16; João Pessoa, Brazil; US$150,000; 17–20 October 2024	Anders Mol (NOR); Christian Sørum (NOR); 25–27, 21–17, 19–17	Cherif Younousse (QAT); Ahmed Tijan (QAT)	David Åhman (SWE); Jonatan Hellvig (SWE); 19–21, 21–18, 15–11	Nicolás Capogrosso (ARG); Tomás Capogrosso (ARG)
Rio de Janeiro Elite 16; Rio de Janeiro, Brazil; US$150,000; 7–10 November 2024	Javier Bello (ENG); Joaquin Bello (ENG); 22–24, 30–28, 15–13	Tomás Capogrosso (ARG); Nicolás Capogrosso (ARG)	Mārtiņš Pļaviņš (LAT); Kristians Fokerots (LAT); 21–18, 13–21, 15–11	Anders Mol (NOR); Christian Sørum (NOR)
Haikou Challenge; Haikou, China; US$75,000; 14–17 November 2024	Evan Cory (USA); Cody Caldwell (USA); 23–21, 23–21	Thomas Hodges (AUS); Zachery Schubert (AUS)	Gianluca Dal Corso (ITA); Marco Viscovich (ITA); 21–19, 21–19	Philipp Huster (GER); Maximilian Just (GER)
Chennai Challenge; Chennai, India; US$75,000; 22–24 November 2024	Jacob Hölting Nilsson (SWE); Elmer Andersson (SWE); 21–18, 21–18	Leon Luini (NED); Ruben Penninga (NED)	Philipp Waller (AUT); Timo Hammarberg (AUT); 21–18, 21–15	Thomas Hodges (AUS); Zachery Schubert (AUS)
Nuvali Challenge; Santa Rosa, Philippines; US$75,000; 29 November–1 December 2024	Jacob Hölting Nilsson (SWE); Elmer Andersson (SWE); 21–17, 21–16	Paul Henning (GER); Lui Wüst (GER)	Javier Bello (ENG); Joaquin Bello (ENG); 21–18, 17–21, 15–12	Philipp Waller (AUT); Timo Hammarberg (AUT)
The Finals; Doha, Qatar; US$800,000; 4–7 December 2024	Anders Mol (NOR); Christian Sørum (NOR); 21–18, 22–20	David Åhman (SWE); Jonatan Hellvig (SWE)	Cherif Younousse (QAT); Ahmed Tijan (QAT); 18–21, 21–15, 17–15	Stefan Boermans (NED); Yorick de Groot (NED)
Maricá Future; Maricá, Brazil; US$5,000; 6–8 December 2024	Igor Borges (BRA); Felipe Alves (BRA); 21–16, 21–14	Anton Moiseiev (UKR); Vitalii Savvin (UKR)	Gonzalo Melgarejo (PAR); Giuliano Massare (PAR); 21–18, 12–21, 15–13	Pedro Resende (BRA); Johann Dohmann (BRA)
Pompano Beach Future; Pompano Beach, United States; US$5,000; 6–8 December 2024	Timothy Brewster (USA); Logan Webber (USA); 24–22, 21–16	Caleb Kwekel (USA); Gage Basey (USA)	Nils Ringøen (NOR); Even Stray Aas (NOR); 21–13, 21–17	Alex Ukkelberg (USA); Kevin Coyle (USA)

=== Women ===
Tournament	Champions	Runners-up	Third place	Fourth place
Mollymook Future; Mollymook, Australia; US$5,000; 28 February–3 March 2024	Stefanie Fejes (AUS); Jana Milutinovic (AUS); 21–18, 20–22, 15–2	Suzuka Hashimoto (JPN); Reika Murakami (JPN)	Jasmine Fleming (AUS); Georgia Johnson (AUS); 21–12, 21–13	Alaina Chacon (USA); Mariah Whalen (USA)
Doha Elite 16; Doha, Qatar; US$150,000; 5–9 March 2024	Carolina Solberg Salgado (BRA); Bárbara Seixas (BRA); 21–18, 21–18	Melissa Humana-Paredes (CAN); Brandie Wilkerson (CAN)	Sara Hughes (USA); Kelly Cheng (USA); 21–15, 21–18	Tīna Graudiņa (LAT); Anastasija Samoilova (LAT)
Mount Manganui Future; Mount Maunganui, New Zealand; US$5,000; 7–10 March 2024	Shaunna Polley (NZL); Alice Zeimann (NZL); 17–21, 21–19, 15–13	Stefanie Fejes (AUS); Jana Milutinovic (AUS)	Alaina Chacon (USA); Mariah Whalen (USA); 21–16, 22–20	Avery Poppinga (USA); Madison Shields (USA)
Coolangatta Beach Future; Coolangatta, Australia; US$5,000; 21–24 March 2024	Stefanie Fejes (AUS); Jana Milutinovic (AUS); 21–17, 21–14	Alaina Chacon (USA); Mariah Whalen (USA)	Suzuka Hashimoto (JPN); Reika Murakami (JPN); 21–14, 21–16	Delaney Peranich (USA); Maya Gessner (USA)
Recife Challenge; Recife, Brazil; US$75,000; 22–24 March 2024	Tīna Graudiņa (LAT); Anastasija Samoilova (LAT); 21–18, 21–17	Heather Bansley (CAN); Sophie Bukovec (CAN)	Monika Paulikienė (LIT); Ainė Raupelytė (LIT); 21–14, 17–21, 15–9	Sandra Ittlinger (GER); Karla Borger (GER)
Saquarema Challenge; Saquarema, Brazil; US$75,000; 29–31 March 2024	Xue Chen (CHN); Xia Xinyi (CHN); 23–25, 24–22, 15–11	Laura Ludwig (GER); Louisa Lippmann (GER)	Taiana Lima (BRA); Talita Antunes (BRA); 21–16, 18–21, 15–9	Hegeile Almeida (BRA); Vitória Rodrigues (BRA)
Pirae Tahiti Future; Pirae, French Polynesia; US$5,000; 10–12 April 2024	Molly Shaw (USA); Chloe Loreen (USA); 21–13, 21–18	Kelly Kool (USA); Tiffany Svenssohn (USA)	Erika Nyström (CYP); Alexandra Gusarova (CYP); 21–15, 19–21, 15–11	Eléonore Johansen (FRA); Céline Collette (FRA)
Guadalajara Challenge; Guadalajara, Mexico; US$75,000; 11–14 April 2024	Esmée Böbner (SUI); Zoé Vergé-Dépré (SUI); 21–12, 21–16	Ágatha Bednarczuk (BRA); Rebecca Cavalcante (BRA)	Heather Bansley (CAN); Sophie Bukovec (CAN); 21–18, 21–14	Sandra Ittlinger (GER); Karla Borger (GER)
Nuvali Future; Santa Rosa, Philippines; US$5,000; 11–14 April 2024	Chenoa Christ (GER); Anna-Lena Grüne (GER); 21–12, 13–21, 15–12	Alaina Chacon (USA); Mariah Whalen (USA)	Riko Tsujimura (JPN); Takemi Nishibori (JPN); 14–21, 21–15, 15–12	Danielle Quigley (NZL); Olivia MacDonald (NZL)
Tepic Elite 16; Tepic, Mexico; US$150,000; 17–21 April 2024	Tanja Hüberli (SUI); Nina Brunner (SUI); 21–14, 19–21, 19–17	Katja Stam (NED); Raïsa Schoon (NED)	Carolina Solberg Salgado (BRA); Bárbara Seixas (BRA); 22–20, 21–23, 25–23	Valentina Gottardi (ITA); Marta Menegatti (ITA)
Xiamen Challenge; Xiamen, China; US$75,000; 26–28 April 2024	Sandra Ittlinger (GER); Karla Borger (GER); 22–20, 21–14	Anouk Vergé-Dépré (SUI); Joana Mäder (SUI)	Daniela Álvarez (ESP); Tania Moreno (ESP); 21–16, 21–16	Ainė Raupelytė (LIT); Monika Paulikienė (LIT)
Brasília Elite 16; Brasília, Brazil; US$150,000; 2–5 May 2024	Ana Patrícia Ramos (BRA); Eduarda Santos Lisboa (BRA); 21–17, 21–14	Kristen Nuss (USA); Taryn Kloth (USA)	Esmée Böbner (SUI); Zoé Vergé-Dépré (SUI); 21–15, 13–21, 15–9	Katja Stam (NED); Raïsa Schoon (NED)
Pingtan Future; Pingtan, China; US$5,000; 10–12 May 2024	Bai Bing (CHN); Wang Fan (CHN); 24–22, 15–21, 15–13	Margherita Bianchin (ITA); Claudia Scampoli (ITA)	Julhia Perandre (BRA); Marcela Mattoso (BRA); 21–12, 21–18	Linline Matauatu (VAN); Majabelle Lawac (VAN)
Wuhan Qingshan Future; Wuhan, China; US$5,000; 17–19 May 2024	Yan Xu (CHN); Zhou Mingli (CHN); 21–18, 21–18	Jiang Kaiyue (CHN); Yuan Lvwen (CHN)	Wang Xinxin (CHN); Xing Jiayi (CHN); 16–21, 22–20, 15–10	Nur Sari (INA); Desi Ratnasari (INA)
Cervia Future; Cervia, Italy; US$5,000; 17–19 May 2024	Margherita Bianchin (ITA); Claudia Scampoli (ITA); 21–19, 21–19	Michelle Valiente (PAR); Giuliana Poletti (PAR)	Reka Orsi Toth (ITA); Giada Bianchi (ITA); 21–17, 18–21, 15–12	Jasmine Fleming (AUS); Jana Milutinovic (AUS)
Madrid Future; Madrid, Spain; US$5,000; 17–19 May 2024	Jagoda Gruszczyńska (POL); Aleksandra Wachowicz (POL); 21–14, 21–13	Valentyna Davidova (UKR); Anhelina Khmil (UKR)	Sarah Cools (BEL); Lisa van den Vonder (BEL); 21–16, 21–15	Līva Ēbere (LAT); Deniela Konstantinova (LAT)
Espinho Elite 16; Espinho, Portugal; US$150,000; 23–26 May 2024	Kristen Nuss (USA); Taryn Kloth (USA); 17–21, 28–26, 15–10	Tanja Hüberli (SUI); Nina Brunner (SUI)	Katja Stam (NED); Raïsa Schoon (NED); 21–18, 21–12	Daniela Álvarez (ESP); Tania Moreno (ESP)
Battipaglia Future; Battipaglia, Italy; US$5,000; 24–26 May 2024	Michelle Valiente (PAR); Giuliana Poletti (PAR); 24–22, 21–12	Reka Orsi Toth (ITA); Giada Bianchi (ITA)	Rachele Mancinelli (ITA); Aurora Mattavelli (ITA); 21–19, 21–7	Julia Sude (GER); Lea Kunst (GER)
Spiez Future; Spiez, Switzerland; US$5,000; 30 May–2 June 2024	Brecht Piersma (NED); Wies Bekhuis (NED); 21–19, 21–14	Markéta Sluková (CZE); Karin Žolnerčíková (CZE)	Eva Liisa Kuivonen (EST); Liisa-Lotta Jürgenson (EST); 21–18, 21–15	Annique Niederhauser (SUI); Leona Kernen (SUI)
Warmia–Mazury Challenge; Stare Jabłonki, Poland; US$75,000; 31 May–2 June 2024	Xue Chen (CHN); Xia Xinyi (CHN); 21–16, 22–20	Tīna Graudiņa (LAT); Anastasija Samoilova (LAT)	Liliana Fernández (ESP); Paula Soria (ESP) w/o	Heather Bansley (CAN); Sophie Bukovec (CAN)
Ostrava Elite 16; Ostrava, Czech Republic; US$150,000; 6–9 June 2024	Sara Hughes (USA); Kelly Cheng (USA); 21–13, 21–23, 15–12	Melissa Humana-Paredes (CAN); Brandie Wilkerson (CAN)	Tīna Graudiņa (LAT); Anastasija Samoilova (LAT); 21–18, 21–19	Ana Patrícia Ramos (BRA); Eduarda Santos Lisboa (BRA)
Sveti Vlas Future; Sveti Vlas, Bulgaria; US$5,000; 7–9 June 2024	Carly Kan (USA); Madelyne Anderson (USA); 24–22, 17–21, 15–8	Brecht Piersma (NED); Wies Bekhuis (NED)	Kennedy Coakley (USA); Brooke Sweat (USA); 21–10, 17–21, 15–10	Elsa Descamps (FRA); Marine Kinna (FRA)
Kraków Future; Kraków, Poland; US$5,000; 14–16 June 2024	Stefanie Fejes (AUS); Georgia Johnson (AUS); 17–21, 21–11, 15–9	Małgorzata Ciężkowska (POL); Urszula Łunio (POL)	Kennedy Coakley (USA); Brooke Sweat (USA); 21–17, 21–14	Madison Shields (USA); Delaney Peranich (USA)
Ios Island Future; Ios, Greece; US$5,000; 20–22 June 2024	Julia Sude (GER); Lea Kunst (GER); 21–15, 21–19	Stefanie Fejes (AUS); Georgia Johnson (AUS)	Maryna Hladun (UKR); Tetiana Lazarenko (UKR); 21–16, 21–13	Madison Shields (USA); Delaney Peranich (USA)
Messina Future; Messina, Italy; US$5,000; 20–23 June 2024	Anna-Lena Grüne (GER); Chenoa Christ (GER); 21–13, 21–13	Margareta Kozuch (GER); Sarah Schneider (GER)	Reka Orsi Toth (ITA); Giada Bianchi (ITA); 21–19, 21–17	Heleene Hollas (EST); Liisa Remmelg (EST)
Baden Future; Baden bei Wien, Austria; US$5,000; 27–29 June 2024	Sarah Cools (BEL); Lisa van den Vonder (BEL); 19–21, 21–15, 17–15	Heleene Hollas (EST); Liisa Remmelg (EST)	Maryna Hladun (UKR); Tetiana Lazarenko (UKR); 21–15, 21–18	Valerie Dvorníková (CZE); Anna Pospíšilová (CZE)
Rakvere Future; Rakvere, Estonia; US$5,000; 4–6 July 2024	Anna-Lena Grüne (GER); Chenoa Christ (GER); 15–21, 21–14, 15–12	Maryna Hladun (UKR); Tetiana Lazarenko (UKR)	Danielė Kvedaraitė (LTU); Jekaterina Kovalskaja (LTU) w/o	Melanie Paul (GER); Hanna-Marie Schieder (GER)
Gstaad Elite 16; Gstaad, Switzerland; US$150,000; 4–7 July 2024	Kristen Nuss (USA); Taryn Kloth (USA); 19–21, 21–15, 15–11	Terese Cannon (USA); Megan Kraft (USA)	Tīna Graudiņa (LAT); Anastasija Samoilova (LAT); 21–16, 21–10	Ágatha Bednarczuk (BRA); Rebecca Cavalcante (BRA)
Vienna Elite 16; Vienna, Austria; US$150,000; 10–13 July 2024	Svenja Müller (GER); Cinja Tillmann (GER); 21–14, 21–18	Anouk Vergé-Dépré (SUI); Joana Mäder (SUI)	Terese Cannon (USA); Megan Kraft (USA); 21–16, 22–20	Ágatha Bednarczuk (BRA); Rebecca Cavalcante (BRA)
Leuven Future; Leuven, Belgium; US$5,000; 19–21 July 2024	Lexy Denaburg (USA); Deahna Kraft (USA); 21–19, 21–16	Lisa Luini (NED); Desy Poiesz (NED)	Sarah Cools (BEL); Lisa van den Vonder (BEL); 22–20, 21–16	Madelyne Anderson (USA); Brook Bauer (USA)
Brussels Future; Brussels, Belgium; US$5,000; 2–4 August 2024	Niina Ahtiainen (FIN); Taru Lahti-Liukkonen (FIN); 21–19, 21–19	Janne Uhl (GER); Paula Schürholz (GER)	Sarah Cools (BEL); Lisa van den Vonder (BEL); 23–21, 21–15	Sandra Ittlinger (GER); Kim van de Velde (GER)
Hamburg Elite 16; Hamburg, Germany; US$150,000; 22–25 August 2024	Tanja Hüberli (SUI); Nina Brunner (SUI); 21–18, 18–21, 18–16	Svenja Müller (GER); Cinja Tillmann (GER)	Thamela Galil (BRA); Victória Lopes (BRA); 21–19, 21–19	Valentina Gottardi (ITA); Marta Menegatti (ITA)
Brno Future; Brno, Czech Republic; US$5,000; 23–25 August 2024	Kylie Neuschaeferová (CZE); Markéta Svozilová (CZE); 21–17, 21–11	Juliana Simões (BRA); Caroline Curtinaz (BRA)	Barbora Hermannová (CZE); Marie-Sára Štochlová (CZE); 21–10, 21–11	Miroslava Dunárová (CZE); Daniela Mokrá (CZE)
Halifax Future; Halifax, Canada; US$5,000; 22–25 August 2024	Madelyne Anderson (USA); Brook Bauer (USA); 21–18, 17–21, 17–15	Marie-Alex Bélanger (CAN); Lea Monkhouse (CAN)	Kayla Law-Heese (CAN); Ruby Sorra (CAN); 19–21, 21–17, 15–12	Katerina Pavelková (CZE); Anna Pavelková (CZE)
Corigliano-Rossano Future; Corigliano-Rossano, Italy; US$5,000; 30 August–1 September 2024	Reka Orsi Toth (ITA); Giada Bianchi (ITA); 21–17, 25–23	Eleonora Sestini (ITA); Erika Ditta (ITA)	Valentina Calì (ITA); Jessica Allegretti (ITA); 21–15, 20–22, 15–10	Marta Ozoliņa (LAT); Luize Skrastiņa (LAT)
Qidong Future; Qidong, China; US$5,000; 6–8 September 2024	Zhou Mingli (CHN); Yan Xu (CHN); 21–16, 11–21, 15–12	Jiang Kaiyue (CHN); Yu Tong (CHN)	Asami Shiba (JPN); Saki Maruyama (JPN); 23–21, 18–21, 15–12	Wang Jing (CHN); Liang Yunjia (CHN)
Warsaw Future; Warsaw, Poland; US$5,000; 6–8 September 2024	Yeva Serdiuk (UKR); Daria Romaniuk (UKR); 21–12, 21–14	Aleksandra Wachowicz (POL); Julia Radelczuk (POL)	Danielė Kvedaraitė (LTU); Jekaterina Kovalskaja (LTU); 21–17, 17–21, 15–12	Inna Makhno (UKR); Sofiia Rylova (UKR)
Bujumbura Future; Bujumbura, Burundi; US$5,000; 12–14 September 2024	Miharu Kashihara (JPN); Izumi Ishihara (JPN); 21–17, 23–21	Kelly Kool (USA); Tiffany Svenssohn (USA)	Elisavet Triantafillidi (GRE); Dimitra Manavi (GRE); 21–9, 21–12	Pamella Irakoze (BDI); Emmanuelie Ndayikengurukiye (BDI)
Qingdao Future; Qingdao, China; US$5,000; 13–15 September 2024	Wang Jingzhe (CHN); Aheidan Mushajiang (CHN); 23–21, 21–17	Jiang Kaiyue (CHN); Yu Tong (CHN)	Asami Shiba (JPN); Chika Nakagawa (JPN); 17–21, 21–16, 15–13	Han Wenqin (CHN); Siyu Qi (CHN)
Castellón Future; Castellón de la Plana, Spain; US$5,000; 19–21 September 2024	Madelyne Anderson (USA); Brook Bauer (USA); 19–21, 23–21, 15–9	Elsa Descamps (FRA); Romane Sobezalz (FRA)	Lisa Luini (NED); Desy Poiesz (NED); 14–21, 21–18, 15–9	Menia Bentele (SUI); Muriel Bossart (SUI)
Balıkesir Future; Balıkesir, Turkey; US$5,000; 20–22 September 2024	Yeva Serdiuk (UKR); Daria Romaniuk (UKR); 24–26, 21–16, 28–26	Heleene Hollas (EST); Liisa Remmelg (EST)	Franziska Friedl (AUT); Lia Berger (AUT); 18–21, 21–14, 16–14	Valerie Dvorníková (CZE); Anna Pospíšilová (CZE)
João Pessoa Elite 16; João Pessoa, Brazil; US$150,000; 17–20 October 2024	Thamela Galil (BRA); Victória Lopes (BRA); 21–14, 21–14	Taiana Lima (BRA); Talita Antunes (BRA)	Kimberly Hildreth (USA); Teegan Van Gunst (USA); 21–18, 21–14	Deahna Kraft (USA); Lexy Denaburg (USA)
Rio de Janeiro Elite 16; Rio de Janeiro, Brazil; US$150,000; 7–10 November 2024	Carolina Solberg Salgado (BRA); Bárbara Seixas (BRA); 21–17, 21–18	Terese Cannon (USA); Megan Kraft (USA)	Thamela Galil (BRA); Victória Lopes (BRA); 21–19, 21–16	Sandra Ittlinger (GER); Kim van de Velde (GER)
Haikou Challenge; Haikou, China; US$75,000; 14–17 November 2024	Xue Chen (CHN); Zeng Jinjin (CHN); 21–15, 21–15	Molly Shaw (USA); Toni Rodriguez (USA)	Lézana Placette (FRA); Alexia Richard (FRA); 17–21, 21–19, 15–11	Wang Xinxin (CHN); Dong Jie (CHN)
Chennai Challenge; Chennai, India; US$75,000; 22–24 November 2024	Maryna Hladun (UKR); Tetiana Lazarenko (UKR); 23–21, 21–17	Hailey Harward (USA); Kylie Kuyava-DeBerg (USA)	Molly Shaw (USA); Toni Rodriguez (USA); 21–11, 20–22, 15–8	Monika Paulikienė (LTU); Ainė Raupelytė (LTU)
Nuvali Challenge; Santa Rosa, Philippines; US$75,000; 29 November–1 December 2024	Molly Shaw (USA); Toni Rodriguez (USA); 24–22, 17–21, 15–10	Noa Sonneville (NED); Brecht Piersma (NED)	Sandra Ittlinger (GER); Kim van de Velde (GER); 21–18, 21–16	Małgorzata Ciężkowska (POL); Urszula Łunio (POL)
The Finals; Doha, Qatar; US$800,000; 4–7 December 2024	Kristen Nuss (USA); Taryn Kloth (USA); 21–19, 21–17	Terese Cannon (USA); Megan Kraft (USA)	Tīna Graudiņa (LAT); Anastasija Samoilova (LAT); 24–22, 21–16	Xue Chen (CHN); Xia Xinyi (CHN)
Maricá Future; Maricá, Brazil; US$5,000; 6–8 December 2024	Verena Figueira (BRA); Kyce Martins (BRA); 21–13, 21–15	Flávia Moura (BRA); Fabrine Conceição (BRA)	Emanuely Pereira (BRA); Quemile Vieira (BRA); 19–21, 27–25, 15–10	Carolina Sallaberry (BRA); Marcela Mattoso (BRA)
Pompano Beach Future; Pompano Beach, United States; US$5,000; 6–8 December 2024	Kimberly Hildreth (USA); Xolani Hodel (USA); 21–19, 21–15	Madison Shields (USA); Avery Poppinga (USA)	Devon Newberry (USA); Jaden Whitmarsh (USA); 21–17, 21–6	Inès Piret (BEL); Youna Coens (BEL)

== Medal table by country ==
Rank	Nation	Gold	Silver	Bronze	Total
1	United States	16	12	13	41
2	Brazil	10	7	9	26
3	Germany	8	9	6	23
4	Sweden	7	3	2	12
5	China	7	3	1	11
6	Italy	6	5	7	18
7	Czech Republic	5	2	1	8
8	Australia	4	7	3	14
9	Switzerland	4	5	3	12
10	Norway	4	0	4	8
11	Latvia	3	3	6	12
12	Ukraine	3	3	3	9
13	Austria	3	1	4	8
14	Netherlands	2	9	4	15
15	Belgium	2	0	4	6
16	England	2	0	3	5
17	New Zealand	2	0	1	3
18	Canada	1	6	2	9
19	Poland	1	4	2	7
20	Japan	1	2	4	7
21	France	1	2	3	6
22	Paraguay	1	1	1	3
23	Hungary	1	1	0	2
23	Israel	1	1	0	2
25	Chile	1	0	1	2
26	Finland	1	0	0	1
26	Indonesia	1	0	0	1
28	Cuba	0	3	1	4
28	Estonia	0	3	1	4
30	Spain	0	1	2	3
31	Qatar	0	1	1	2
31	Thailand	0	1	1	2
33	Argentina	0	1	0	1
33	Denmark	0	1	0	1
33	Philippines	0	1	0	1
36	Lithuania	0	0	3	3
37	Cyprus	0	0	1	1
37	Greece	0	0	1	1
Totals (38 entries)		98	98	98	294
