= Beach volleyball at the 2022 Commonwealth Games – Men's tournament =

Beach volleyball – Men's tournament at the 2022 Commonwealth Games
- Venue: Smithfield
- Dates: 30 July – 7 August 2022
- Competitors: 24 from 12 nations

Medalists
gold medal	Paul Burnett; Chris McHugh	Australia
silver medal	Daniel Dearing; Sam Schachter	Canada
bronze medal	Javier Bello; Joaquin Bello	England

The men's beach volleyball tournament at the 2022 Commonwealth Games will be held in Smithfield between 30 July and 7 August 2022.

== Schedule ==
All times based on British Summer Time (UTC+01:00)

Date	Time	Phase
30 July – 4 August	14:30	Group stage
30 July – 4 August	19:00	Group stage
5 August	11:00	Quarter-finals
5 August	14:30	Quarter-finals
5 August	19:00	Quarter-finals
6 August	15:00	Semi-finals
7 August	15:00	Bronze medal match
7 August	16:00	Gold medal match

== Qualification ==
Qualification for the tournament happened as follows:

Means of qualification	Date	Location	Quotas	Qualified
Host Nation	—	—	1	England
FIVB Beach Volleyball World Rankings	16 April 2018 – 31 March 2022	—	5	Canada; Australia; New Zealand; The Gambia; Rwanda
Oceania Ranking (Note: The men's continental qualifiers for the Americas / Caribbean and Oceania were abandoned due to the COVID-19 pandemic, so the associated quota places were awarded to the highest-ranked nations from those regions.)	16 April 2018 – 31 March 2022	—	1	Tuvalu
Americas / Caribbean Ranking	16 April 2018 – 31 March 2022	—	1	Saint Kitts and Nevis
European Qualifier	24–26 September 2021	(Scotland) Edinburgh	1	Cyprus
Asian Qualifier	18–19 March 2022	(Sri Lanka) Negombo	1	Sri Lanka
African Qualifier	25–28 March 2022	(Ghana) Accra	1	South Africa
Bipartite Invitation	21 April 2022	—	1	Maldives
TOTAL			12	

Scheduling issues

== Competition format ==
In June 2022, twelve pairs were drawn into three groups; the top two performing pairs in each group, plus the two best third-place pairs advance to the knockout stage.

== Group stage ==
=== Pool A ===
Pos	Team	Pld	W	L	Pts	SW	SL	SR	SPW	SPL	SPR	Qualification
1	Dearing – Schachter (CAN)	3	3	0	6	6	1	6.000	137	96	1.427	Quarterfinals
2	Jawo – Jarra (GAM)	3	2	1	5	5	3	1.667	149	118	1.263	Quarterfinals
3	Yapa – Rashmika (SRI)	3	1	2	4	3	4	0.750	111	119	0.933	Ranking of third-placed teams
4	Hodge – Seabrookes (SKN)	3	0	3	3	0	6	0.000	62	126	0.492	

Source: birmingham2022.com

31 July 2022; 14:30	Dearing – Schachter (CAN)	2–0	Yapa – Rashmika (SRI)	Smithfield
31 July 2022; 14:30	(21–13, 21–12); Report			Smithfield

31 July 2022; 19:00	Jawo – Jarra (GAM)	2–0	Hodge – Seabrookes (SKN)	Smithfield
31 July 2022; 19:00	(21–14, 21–7); Report			Smithfield

2 August 2022; 16:30	Dearing – Schachter (CAN)	2–0	Hodge – Seabrookes (SKN)	Smithfield
2 August 2022; 16:30	(21–12, 21–7); Report			Smithfield

2 August 2022; 19:00	Jawo – Jarra (GAM)	2–1	Yapa – Rashmika (SRI)	Smithfield
2 August 2022; 19:00	(21–14, 19–21, 15–9); Report			Smithfield

4 August 2022; 14:30	Dearing – Schachter (CAN)	2–1	Jawo – Jarra (GAM)	Smithfield
4 August 2022; 14:30	(17–21, 21–19, 15–12); Report			Smithfield

4 August 2022; 19:00	Hodge – Seabrookes (SKN)	0–2	Yapa – Rashmika (SRI)	Smithfield
4 August 2022; 19:00	(11–21, 11–21); Report			Smithfield

=== Pool B ===
Pos	Team	Pld	W	L	Pts	SW	SL	SR	SPW	SPL	SPR	Qualification
1	Burnett – McHugh (AUS)	3	3	0	6	6	0	MAX	126	88	1.432	Quarterfinals
2	Ntagengwa – Gatsinze (RWA)	3	2	1	5	4	3	1.333	127	128	0.992	Quarterfinals
3	Williams – Goldschmidt (RSA)	3	1	2	4	2	5	0.400	109	132	0.826	Ranking of third-placed teams
4	Ismail – Naseem (MDV)	3	0	3	3	2	6	0.333	129	143	0.902	

Source: birmingham2022.com

Qualified for the Quarterfinals

30 July 2022; 14:30	Ntagengwa – Gatsinze (RWA)	2–0	Williams – Goldschmidt (RSA)	Smithfield
30 July 2022; 14:30	(21–19, 21–16); Report			Smithfield

30 July 2022; 19:00	Burnett – McHugh (AUS)	2–0	Ismail – Naseem (MDV)	Smithfield
30 July 2022; 19:00	(21–13, 21–17); Report			Smithfield

1 August 2022; 14:30	Burnett – McHugh (AUS)	2–0	Williams – Goldschmidt (RSA)	Smithfield
1 August 2022; 14:30	(21–12, 21–12); Report			Smithfield

1 August 2022; 19:00	Ntagengwa – Gatsinze (RWA)	2–1	Ismail – Naseem (MDV)	Smithfield
1 August 2022; 19:00	(21–16, 14–21, 16–14); Report			Smithfield

3 August 2022; 14:30	Burnett – McHugh (AUS)	2–0	Ntagengwa – Gatsinze (RWA)	Smithfield
3 August 2022; 14:30	(21–16, 21–18); Report			Smithfield

3 August 2022; 19:00	Williams – Goldschmidt (RSA)	2–1	Ismail – Naseem (MDV)	Smithfield
3 August 2022; 19:00	(21–16, 14–21, 15–11); Report			Smithfield

=== Pool C ===
Pos	Team	Pld	W	L	Pts	SW	SL	SR	SPW	SPL	SPR	Qualification
1	O'Dea – Fuller (NZL)	3	3	0	6	6	0	MAX	126	97	1.299	Quarterfinals
2	Bello – Bello (ENG)	3	2	1	5	4	2	2.000	119	93	1.280	Quarterfinals
3	Liotatis – Zorbis (CYP)	3	1	2	4	2	4	0.500	102	114	0.895	Ranking of third-placed teams
4	Malosa – Issac (TUV)	3	0	3	3	0	6	0.000	83	126	0.659	

Source: birmingham2022.com

Qualified for the Quarterfinals

30 July 2022; 14:30	Bello – Bello (ENG)	2–0	Malosa – Issac (TUV)	Smithfield
30 July 2022; 14:30	(21–10, 21–12); Report			Smithfield

30 July 2022; 19:00	O'Dea – Fuller (NZL)	2–0	Liotatis – Zorbis (CYP)	Smithfield
30 July 2022; 19:00	(21–18, 21–13); Report			Smithfield

1 August 2022; 14:30	Bello – Bello (ENG)	2–0	Liotatis – Zorbis (CYP)	Smithfield
1 August 2022; 14:30	(21–11, 21–18); Report			Smithfield

1 August 2022; 19:00	O'Dea – Fuller (NZL)	2–0	Malosa – Issac (TUV)	Smithfield
1 August 2022; 19:00	(21–14, 21–17); Report			Smithfield

3 August 2022; 14:30	Liotatis – Zorbis (CYP)	2–0	Malosa – Issac (TUV)	Smithfield
3 August 2022; 14:30	(21–13, 21–17); Report			Smithfield

3 August 2022; 19:00	Bello – Bello (ENG)	0–2	O'Dea – Fuller (NZL)	Smithfield
3 August 2022; 19:00	(19–21, 16–21); Report			Smithfield

=== Ranking of third-placed teams ===
Pos	Grp	Team	Pld	W	L	Pts	SW	SL	SR	SPW	SPL	SPR	Qualification
1	A	Yapa – Rashmika (SRI)	3	1	2	4	3	4	0.750	111	119	0.933	Quarterfinals
2	C	Liotatis – Zorbis (CYP)	3	1	2	4	2	4	0.500	102	114	0.895	Quarterfinals
3	B	Williams – Goldschmidt (RSA)	3	1	2	4	2	5	0.400	109	132	0.826	

Source: birmingham2022.com

== Knockout stage ==
Quarterfinals
A1	Dearing – Schachter (CAN)	21	21
C3	Liotatis – Zorbis (CYP)	9	11
C2	Bello – Bello (ENG)	21	20	15
A2	Jawo – Jarra (GAM)	16	22	12
B2	Ntagengwa – Gatsinze (RWA)	21	21
C1	O'Dea – Fuller (NZL)	18	19
A3	Yapa – Rashmika (SRI)	21	16	9
B1	Burnett – McHugh (AUS)	16	21	15

Semifinals
A1	Dearing – Schachter (CAN)	15	21	15
C2	Bello – Bello (ENG)	21	13	7
B2	Ntagengwa – Gatsinze (RWA)	18	14
B1	Burnett – McHugh (AUS)	21	21

Gold medal match
A1	Dearing – Schachter (CAN)	21	17	18
B1	Burnett – McHugh (AUS)	17	21	20
Bronze medal match
C2	Bello – Bello (ENG)	21	21
B2	Ntagengwa – Gatsinze (RWA)	11	12

=== Quarterfinals ===
5 August 2022; 11:00	O'Dea – Fuller (NZL)	0–2	Ntagengwa – Gatsinze (RWA)	Smithfield
5 August 2022; 11:00	(18–21, 19–21); Report			Smithfield

5 August 2022; 12:00	Yapa – Rashmika (SRI)	1–2	Burnett – McHugh (AUS)	Smithfield
5 August 2022; 12:00	(21–16, 16–21, 9–15); Report			Smithfield

5 August 2022; 16:30	Bello – Bello (ENG)	2–1	Jawo – Jarra (GAM)	Smithfield
5 August 2022; 16:30	(21–16, 20–22, 15–12); Report			Smithfield

5 August 2022; 19:00	Dearing – Schachter (CAN)	2–0	Liotatis – Zorbis (CYP)	Smithfield
5 August 2022; 19:00	(21–9, 21–11); Report			Smithfield

=== Semifinals ===
6 August 2022; 15:00	Ntagengwa – Gatsinze (RWA)	0–2	Burnett – McHugh (AUS)	Smithfield
6 August 2022; 15:00	(18–21, 14–21); Report			Smithfield

6 August 2022; 16:00	Dearing – Schachter (CAN)	2–1	Bello – Bello (ENG)	Smithfield
6 August 2022; 16:00	(15–21, 21–13, 15–7); Report			Smithfield

=== Bronze medal match ===
7 August 2022; 15:00	Bello – Bello (ENG)	2–0	Ntagengwa – Gatsinze (RWA)	Smithfield
7 August 2022; 15:00	(21–11, 21–12); Report			Smithfield

=== Gold medal match ===
7 August 2022; 16:00	Dearing – Schachter (CAN)	1–2	Burnett – McHugh (AUS)	Smithfield
7 August 2022; 16:00	(21–17, 17–21, 18–20); Report			Smithfield
