= Cycling at the 2022 Commonwealth Games – Women's road race =

Women's road race at the 2022 Commonwealth Games
- Venue: Myton Fields
- Dates: 7 August
- Competitors: 56 from 18 nations
- Winning time: 2:44:46

Medalists
gold medal	Georgia Baker	Australia
silver medal	Neah Evans	Scotland
bronze medal	Sarah Roy	Australia

The women's road race at the 2022 Commonwealth Games in Birmingham, England was held on 7 August.

== Schedule ==
The schedule was as follows:

Date	Time	Round
Sunday 7 August 2022	8:00	Race

All times are British Summer Time (UTC+1)

== Results ==
The results were as follows:

Rank	Name	Time	Behind
1st place, gold medalist(s)	Georgia Baker (AUS)	2:44:46	–
2nd place, silver medalist(s)	Neah Evans (SCO)	s.t.	+0
3rd place, bronze medalist(s)	Sarah Roy (AUS)	s.t.	"
4	Vera Looser (NAM)	s.t.	"
5	Maggie Coles-Lyster (CAN)	s.t.	"
6	Teniel Campbell (TTO)	s.t.	"
7	Simone Boilard (CAN)	s.t.	"
8	Eluned King (WAL)	s.t.	"
9	Antri Christoforou (CYP)	s.t.	"
10	Alice Barnes (ENG)	s.t.	"
11	Ashleigh Pasio (RSA)	s.t.	"
12	Hayley Preen (RSA)	s.t.	"
13	Georgia Williams (NZL)	s.t.	"
14	Alison Jackson (CAN)	s.t.	"
15	Alice Sharpe (NIR)	s.t.	"
16	Kimberley Le Court (MRI)	s.t.	"
17	Niamh Fisher-Black (NZL)	s.t.	"
18	Jessica Roberts (WAL)	s.t.	"
19	Lizzie Holden (IOM)	s.t.	"
20	Leah Kirchmann (CAN)	s.t.	"
21	Anna Shackley (SCO)	s.t.	"
22	Jessica Carridge (IOM)	s.t.	"
23	Alexandra Manly (AUS)	s.t.	"
24	Anna Henderson (ENG)	s.t.	"
25	Aurelie Halbwachs (MRI)	2:44:53	+7
26	Rebecca Storrie (IOM)	s.t.	"
27	Leah Dixon (WAL)	s.t.	"
28	Joss Lowden (ENG)	s.t.	"
29	Ruby Roseman-Gannon (AUS)	2:44:57	+11
30	Mikayla Harvey (NZL)	s.t.	"
31	Ella Harris (NZL)	s.t.	"
32	Henrietta Christie (NZL)	s.t.	"
33	Grace Brown (AUS)	s.t.	"
34	Josie Nelson (ENG)	2:45:05	+19
35	Brodie Chapman (AUS)	2:45:08	+22
36	Maddie Leech (ENG)	2:45:37	+51
37	Abi Smith (ENG)	s.t.	"
38	Elynor Bäckstedt (WAL)	2:45:45	+59
39	Kerry Jonker (RSA)	2:50:03	+5:17
40	Raphaëlle Lamusse (MRI)	s.t.	"
41	Elinor Barker (WAL)	s.t.	"
42	Olivia Lett (GIB)	2:50:30	+5:44
43	Ariane Bonhomme (CAN)	s.t.	"
	Anna Christian (IOM)	DNF	
	Megan Barker (WAL)	DNF	
	Josiane Mukashema (RWA)	DNF	
	Anri Krugel (NAM)	DNF	
	Diane Ingabire (RWA)	DNF	
	Jacqueline Tuyishime (RWA)	DNF	
	Emily Bridson (JEY)	DNF	
	Elaine Pratts (GIB)	DNF	
	Llori Sharpe (JAM)	DNF	
	Kaya Cattouse (BIZ)	DNF	
	Alicia Thompson (BIZ)	DNF	
	Amelia Sharpe (IOM)	DNF	
	Caitlin Conyers (BER)	DNS	
