= Judo at the 2022 Commonwealth Games – Men's 73 kg =

Judo competition

Judo – Men's 73 kg at the 2022 Commonwealth Games
- Venue: Coventry Arena
- Date: 2 August 2022
- Competitors: 16 from 16 nations

Medalists
gold medal	Daniel Powell	England
silver medal	Faye Njie	The Gambia
bronze medal	Jake Bensted	Australia
bronze medal	Amir Majeed	Malaysia

The Men's 73 kg judo competitions at the 2022 Commonwealth Games in Birmingham, England took place on August 2 at the Coventry Arena. A total of 16 competitors from 16 nations took part.

== Results ==
The draw is as follows:

Round of 16
Faye Njie (GAM)	10
Matthews Mwango (ZAM)	00 (yellow card)
Tirelo Lekoko (BOT)	00
Chamara Repiyallage (SRI)	10 (yellow card)
Joshua Green (NIR)	11
Jelanie Boyce (TTO)	00
Dato Matsoukatov (CYP)	10
Joe Mahit (VAN)	00
Daniel Powell (ENG)	10
Andrew Munnings (BAH)	00
Narciso Matos (MOZ)	10
Leslie Pandabela (SOL)	00
Jake Bensted (AUS)	01
Billy Rodman (SCO)	00 (yellow card)
William Tai Tin (SAM)	00
Amir Majeed (MAS)	10

Quarter-finals
Faye Njie (GAM)	10 (yellow card)
Chamara Repiyallage (SRI)	00 (yellow card)
Joshua Green (NIR)	00
Dato Matsoukatov (CYP)	10
Daniel Powell (ENG)	10
Narciso Matos (MOZ)	00
Jake Bensted (AUS)	10 (yellow card)
Amir Majeed (MAS)	00

Semi-finals
Faye Njie (GAM)	00 (yellow card)
Dato Matsoukatov (CYP)	00
Daniel Powell (ENG)	10
Jake Bensted (AUS)	00 (yellow card)

Final
Faye Njie (GAM)	00
Daniel Powell (ENG)	10

=== Repechages ===
Repechage
Chamara Repiyallage (SRI)	00 (yellow card)
Joshua Green (NIR)	10
Narciso Matos (MOZ)	00
Amir Majeed (MAS)	10

Bronze medal
Joshua Green (NIR)	00
Jake Bensted (AUS)	10
Amir Majeed (MAS)	10
~~Dato Matsoukatov (CYP)~~	00 (DSQ)
