= Maryna Hladun =

Ukrainian beach volleyball player

Personal information
- Nationality: Ukrainian
- Born: 18 September 1992 (age 33) Sumy, Ukraine
- Height: 1.80 m (5 ft 11 in)
- Weight: 68 kg (150 lb)

Sport
- Sport: Beach volleyball
Medal record
Women's beach volleyball
Representing Ukraine
European Championships
Gold medal – first place	2025 Düsseldorf	Beach
Volleyball World Beach Pro Tour
Gold medal – first place	2023	Warsaw Future II
Gold medal – first place	2024	Chennai Challenge
Silver medal – second place	2024	Rakvere Future
Bronze medal – third place	2024	Ios Island Future
Bronze medal – third place	2024	Baden Future
FIVB Beach Volleyball World Tour
Silver medal – second place	2019	Langkawi Open
Silver medal – second place	2019	Aydin Masters
Bronze medal – third place	2019	Ljubljana Winter Edition
Bronze medal – third place	2019	SMM Pak Bara Beach in Satun

Maryna Hladun née Samoday (born 18 September 1992) is a Ukrainian beach volleyball player.

== Career ==
Her brother Valeriy Samoday was a Ukrainian former beach volleyball player, who competed for Russia since 2016.

In 2008, she competed with Tetyana Sukach at the U18 European Championship in Loutraki, finishing in seventh place and at the U19 Beach Volleyball World Championships in The Hague, finishing in ninth place.

The following year she represented Ukraine at the European U20 Beach Volleyball Championships with Ksenia Chekmaryova, receiving 5th place.

Competing with Elizaveta Sulima, Maryna finished twenty-fifth at the 2010 U19 Beach Volleyball World Championships, held in Porto, and the duo competed at the 2013 U22 European Beach Volleyball Championships in Varna, receiving 4th place.

At the 2019 FIVB Beach Volleyball World Tour Maryna won two silver and two bronze medals with Diana Lunina.

The following years, she competed with Tetiana Lazarenko at the 2023 Volleyball World Beach Pro Tour, winning a gold medal in Warsaw.

In 2024, Hladun competed at the European Beach Volleyball Championships with Tetiana Lazarenko, reaching the round of 16.

In 2025, Hladun won with Lazarenko the European Beach Volleyball Championships in Düsseldorf after have won the final game against the French team Clémence Vieira/Aline Chamereau. It is the first title in a European Beach Volleyball Championship for a Ukrainian team.
