= Henry Hendron =

English former barrister

- Born: 28 December 1980
- Occupation: Barrister
- Years active: 2006–2016, 2019–2023

Henry Joseph Christopher Hendron (born 28 December 1980) is an English former barrister who was known for representing several celebrity clients. In 2016, Hendron pleaded guilty to two counts of possession of a controlled drug with intent to supply, for supplying chemsex drugs that killed his boyfriend in a drug overdose the previous year. Hendron was convicted in 2023 of four offences on admission of the charges related to buying or seeking to buy drugs from his clients. He was disbarred in 2024.

== Life and education ==
Hendron grew up in Ealing, London where he went to Gunnersbury Boys' School, before studying politics at Royal Holloway, University of London. As a 17-year-old, Hendron addressed the 1998 Conservative Party Conference, advocating the reinstatement of corporal punishment and longer jail terms.

In 1999 Hendron featured in a newspaper after apprehending and making a citizen's arrest of a thief fleeing a branch of Santander Bank that he had robbed.

Hendron has a twin brother Richard, a former inspector in the police, and political candidate, who was working as a criminal barrister as of 2015. The two were national competitive kayakers, and from 2009 to 2021 held the record for the world's longest canoe and kayak race, the 1,000 mile "Yukon 1000".

In 2017 Henry obtained a temporary injunction to prevent Richard evicting him from a flat. In a subsequent court hearing Richard called Henry a "drug addict" and the injunction was discharged when Henry failed to attend the hearing. A clip of Hendron speaking in support of Brexit as an audience member of BBC Question Time went viral on Twitter.

Hendron was declared bankrupt in March 2021 due to unpaid income tax.

== Criminal convictions ==
Hendron has three convictions for driving under the influence of alcohol.

Hendron was arrested in January 2015 after his 18-year-old boyfriend died of a drug overdose in Hendron's flat in Middle Temple, where a number of drugs were recovered by the police. Charged with two counts of conspiracy to supply, two counts of possession with intent to supply, and two counts of possession, Hendron initially denied all charges before changing his plea to guilty on the two counts of possession with intent to supply. One of the charges related to the Class B drug mephedrone, while the other related to the Class C drug GBL. Following the two guilty pleas, the other charges were dropped by the prosecution. Hendron was represented by his brother Richard during initial hearings, but changed counsel subsequently. In his evidence, Hendron admitted buying the drugs from then BBC Radio 3 producer Alexander Parkin, but only to share with his boyfriend and to sell on to his friends at cost price. Hendron was sentenced to a community order with 18 months' supervision and 140 hours' unpaid work.

Hendron pleaded guilty in March 2023 to three counts of intentionally encouraging or assisting the commission of an offence and one of possessing a Class A drug in or around 2020 to 2021 while he was practising as a barrister. The offences related to Hendron buying or seeking to buy drugs from two clients he was representing around the same time. In June 2023, Hendron was sentenced to 14 months in jail. Hendron’s appeal against his sentence was rejected by the Court of Appeal in March 2024.

== Legal career ==
Hendron was called to the Bar by Middle Temple in November 2006. Hendron undertook his 'first six' months of his pupillage at the commercial and professional negligence set 4 New Square within Lincoln's Inn, and then spent the 'second six' within the Government Legal Service. Upon qualifying as a barrister Hendron's early legal career took place within the Civil Service, working for the Department for Work and Pensions and the Department of Health as it was then known. On leaving the Civil Service, he worked in commercial law in the Channel Islands before joining the London-based No 3 Fleet Street chambers.

In 2010, Hendron began offering direct access services through an online portal he established. This in turn evolved into a new chambers in 2012 where he was the Head of Chambers. Hendron has represented various high profile individuals, including The Apprentice's 2010 winner Stella English against Alan Sugar, the Earl of Cardigan against the trustees of Savernake Estate, Nadine Dorries MP against Derek Draper, and Suzanne Evans seeking an injunction against her suspension from the UK Independence Party. Hendron's relationship with the Earl of Cardigan fell apart later, however, with Hendron making a claim of unpaid fees of £27,700 against the Earl in 2020.

In 2014 Hendron published a blog post containing "disparaging statements against witnesses" in the trial of his friend Nigel Evans MP. This led to Hendron being reported by the trial judge to the Attorney General for a case of "prima facie contempt of court". After referring himself to the Bar Standards Board, he was fined £2,000 by the Bar Tribunals & Adjudication Service.

Hendron has received reprimands and fines as a result of his drink-driving convictions. Following his conviction for drug dealings, he was suspended for 3 years backdated to May 2016 after admitting to behaving in a way "which was likely to diminish the trust and confidence in which the public places in a barrister or the profession". Concurrently, he was firmly reprimanded and fined £2,000 total for failures in management as Head of Chambers around failing to pay or giving adequate notice of dismissal to a barrister who worked with him at his chambers.

Hendron was reported in 2018 to have been fined £250 by the Bar Standards Board for posting on social media that he was having lunch at Middle Temple while suspended, even though the Bar Standards Board acknowledged Hendron would have been entitled to attend the Inn as a guest of a current member. The decision to fine Hendron £250 was subsequently overturned on appeal by Hendron on the basis that the panel lacked jurisdiction under the Handbook. The Bar Standards Board accepted it lacked jurisdiction, and treated the decision to fine Hendron £250 as not being made and thereafter amended the Handbook so as to give it jurisdiction over Hendron, and then resubmitted the original complaint to a new panel who doubled the fine to £500.

As a result of his interim suspension imposed following his conviction for drug dealings, he was unable to represent one of his direct access clients who had already paid for his service for a hearing in May 2016. The client complained to the Legal Ombudsman after Hendron failed to reimburse the fee paid. Hendron was directed by the Ombudsman to reimburse the fee of £650 along with a compensation of £200, which Hendron then failed to do. For failure to comply with the Ombudsman's direction, and failure to co-operate with a follow-up complaint, he was suspended again this time for 3 months, along with a prohibition from accepting or carrying out direct access instructions for 9 months. The sanction was subsequently overturned following a discovery by the Bar Standards Board while an appeal by Hendron was pending to the High Court that as he was already suspended and non-practising at the time of the non-payment and subsequent non-co-operation, the Bar Standards Board and Legal Ombudsman lacked jurisdiction. An application by the Bar Standards Board that the case be remitted so that a new charge for failure to reimburse the £650 fee could be formulated was denied by the High Court.

Hendron was once again charged by the Bar Standards Board in 2020, in relation to his conduct during his 3 years' suspension. Nine of 18 charges of professional misconduct were found proven by the Bar Tribunals & Adjudication Service in May 2021. Three of the charges were related to him holding himself out as a barrister providing legal services on his websites, and failure to take the website down following requests from the Bar Standards Board. Two of the charges were related to him holding himself out as a barrister in email correspondence with a solicitor and with a lay client. Two of the charges related to him conducting reserved legal activity under the Legal Services Act 2007 by conducting litigation through serving a Notice of Acting. The final two charges related to him using inappropriate or threatening language or both in email correspondence. Apart from the matter of holding himself out as a barrister on his websites where he was only found to have "behaved in a way which was likely to diminish the trust and confidence in which the public places in a barrister or the profession", Hendron was also found to have "behaved in a way which could reasonably be seen by the public to undermine his integrity" on all the other incidents where the charges was proven. For the misconduct, Hendron was reprimanded and prohibited from offering direct access services for two years, as well as being required to attend a training course before resuming direct access work.

Hendron unsuccessfully stood for election to the Bar Council in 2014. He again attempted to stand for election in 2020. However, his initial paperwork submitted 3 minutes before the deadline for nomination was rejected for having his initials where a signature was deemed to be required. His re-submitted paperwork was then rejected for being a minute late.

Hendron was disbarred by the Bar Tribunals & Adjudication Service in July 2024 for behaviours "which could reasonably be seen by the public to undermine his integrity and independence" and "was likely to diminish the trust and confidence which the public places in him or in the profession".
