= Joaquin Bello =

Spanish-born British beach volleyball player

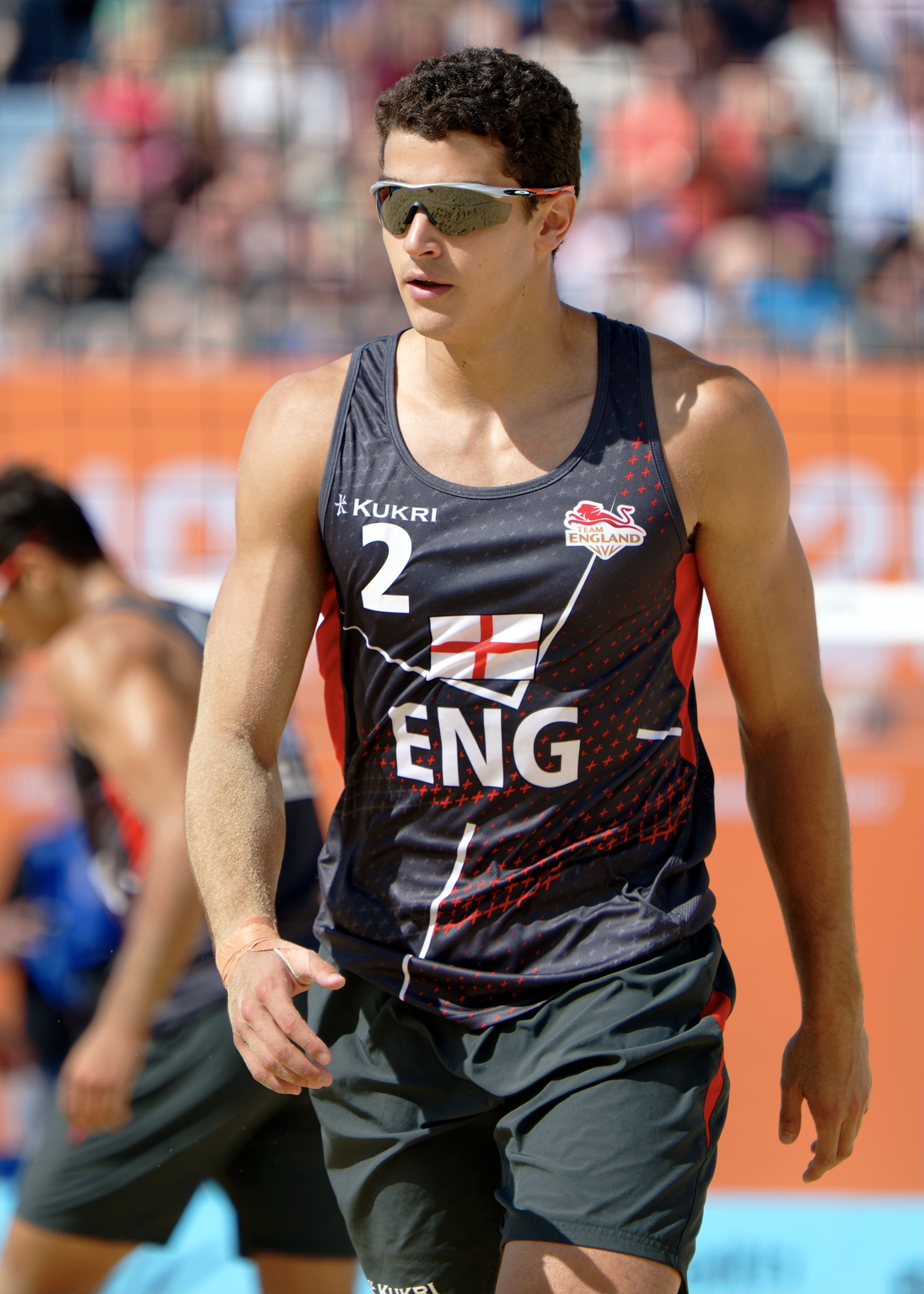
- Joaquin at the 2022 Commonwealth Games

Personal information
- Full name: Joaquin Bello Fernandez Echevarria
- Nationality: British
- Born: 20 July 2000 (age 26); Madrid, Spain
- Height: 1.85 m (6 ft 1 in)
- Weight: 81 kg (179 lb)

Beach volleyball information

Current teammate
Years	Teammate
2016–	Javier Bello
Honours
Men's beach volleyball
Representing England
Commonwealth Games
Bronze medal – third place	2022 Birmingham	Beach volleyball
Volleyball World Beach Pro Tour
Silver medal – second place	2026	Alanya Challenge
Silver medal – second place	2025	Nuvali Challenge
Gold medal – first place	2024	Rio de Janeiro Elite16
Bronze medal – third place	2024	Nuvali Challenge
Bronze medal – third place	2024	Recife Challenge
Bronze medal – third place	2023	Goa Challenge
Bronze medal – third place	2022	Cortegaça Future
FIVB Beach Volleyball World Tour
Gold medal – first place	2021	Cortegaça
Bronze medal – third place	2021	Nijmegen
Bronze medal – third place	2019	Rubavu
Commonwealth Youth Games
Gold medal – first place	2017	Nassau

Joaquin Bello (born 20 July 2000) is a British beach volleyball player and medical doctor.

Together with his twin brother Javier, they are the current British No. 1 team. They made history by winning the Elite16 tournament in Rio de Janeiro, the highest level of World Tour competition, marking the greatest volleyball achievement for a British team. They are also 2022 Commonwealth Games bronze medalists, 10-time World Tour medalists and 6-time British champions.

== Junior career ==
Joaquin and Javier started playing volleyball at the age of 6 at their local club in Madrid. In 2011, their family moved to London and they joined Richmond Volleyball Club, where they won multiple national championships in indoor and beach volleyball in all the underage categories.

In 2016, the brothers started their international beach volleyball career and earned their first England cap at the U17 NEVZA Beach Volleyball Championships, eventually taking the gold medal.

Beach volleyball made its Commonwealth Games debut in the 2017 Commonwealth Youth Games in Nassau, Bahamas. There, the duo won gold, helping England to top the medal table.

Whilst in the middle of their A-levels, the Bello brothers qualified for the 2018 Youth Olympic Games in Buenos Aires, making them the first ever British team to qualify for this competition. They clinched the 5th and last European spot for the Games by beating Hungary in the last playoff match. Representing Team GB for their first time, the brothers lost in the quarterfinal against host country Argentina, ending up in 5th place.

They finished in 5th place at the U19 World Championships in Nanjing, China - Britain’s highest ever finish at any world junior event.

== Senior career ==
Joaquin played his first World Tour event in Aydin, Turkey in 2017.

In 2019, the twins won a bronze medal in Rubavu, Rwanda after being defeated by the eventual champions Japan in the semifinal. It was the first ever World Tour medal for a British men’s team.

In 2021, they won their first World Tour gold medal in Cortegaça, Portugal, the first in British history. They followed that with another medal, a bronze at the World Tour event in Nijmegen.

In 2022, the Volleyball World Beach Pro Tour (BPT) replaced the FIVB World Tour and the Bello brothers won another bronze medal in Cortegaça, Portugal.

At the 2022 Commonwealth Games, the brothers competed for Team England at the Smithfield arena, later nicknamed the "Bellodrome”. They achieved a historic bronze medal, the first for England at the Commonwealth Games, just 5 years on from their triumph at the Commonwealth Youth Games.

In 2023, the team reached the quarterfinals of the European Championship in Vienna, defeating former world champions Brouwer/ Meeuwsen (NED). They followed it up with a bronze medal in the BPT Challenge in Goa, India.

In 2024, the Bello's won another 2 bronze medals at the BPT Challenges in Recife, Brazil and in Nuvali, Philippines.

They then went on to record the "greatest ever volleyball result" for a British team by winning the Elite16 tournament in Rio de Janeiro, the highest level of World Tour competition. Coming all the way from the qualification rounds, they shocked the Olympic champions Mol and Sørum of Norway in the semifinals, and added a hard-fought victory over Argentina in the finals to secure the first major title for England in the iconic Copacabana beach stadium.

In 2025, they became the first British men's team to compete at the FIVB Beach Volleyball World Championship and improved on their previous BPT Challenge Nuvali result by winning silver.

In 2026, they opened their season with a silver medal at the BPT Challenge in Alanya.

Joaquin has won 5 British Championship titles, winning the UK Beach Tour Finals in 2020, 2021, 2022, 2023, 2025 and 2026.

With his brother, he achieved a career-high world ranking of No. 10 in May 2025.

== Personal life ==
After moving to London in 2011, Joaquin attended Gunnersbury Catholic School in Brentford, London.

The brothers train in Barnes and are coached by their father Luis Bello, a former professional player and coach. Beach volleyball is a full family affair with their mum coordinating their support team and their younger brother following on their footsteps in 2023 with a bronze medal in the BPT Futures in Bujumbura, Burundi.

Joaquin is a qualified medical doctor after completing his Medicine studies at Imperial College School of Medicine, earning him the nickname “Doctor Block” on the World Tour.
