= Daniel Powell (judoka, born 1997) =

British judoka (born 1997)

Personal information
- Born: 22 September 1997 (age 28) Walsall, England
- Home town: Sutton Coldfield, England
- Height: 177 cm (5 ft 10 in)

Sport
- Sport: Judo
- Weight class: 73 kg
Medal record
Men's judo
Representing England
Commonwealth Games
Gold medal – first place	2022 Birmingham	73 kg

Daniel Powell (born 22 September 1997) is a British judoka. He won the gold medal in the Men's 73 kg at the 2022 Commonwealth Games. He is currently ranked number 2 in the -73 kg category in the UK by the British Judo Association.

== Early life and education ==
Born in Walsall, Powell is from Sutton Coldfield.

== Career ==
At the junior level between 2015 and 2017, Powell won four bronze and two silver medals in European Cup competitions and a bronze medal at the 2017 U23 Championships in Podgorica.

In senior judo, he is a three times champion of Great Britain, winning the British Judo Championships in 2017, 2019 and 2021.

He won a silver medal at the 2021 European Judo Open Championships in Sarajevo and was selected for the 2022 Commonwealth Games, where he won gold in the Men's 73 kg, defeating Gambian Faye Njie with an ippon in the golden score period.
