= UK Beach Tour =

Professional volleyball competition

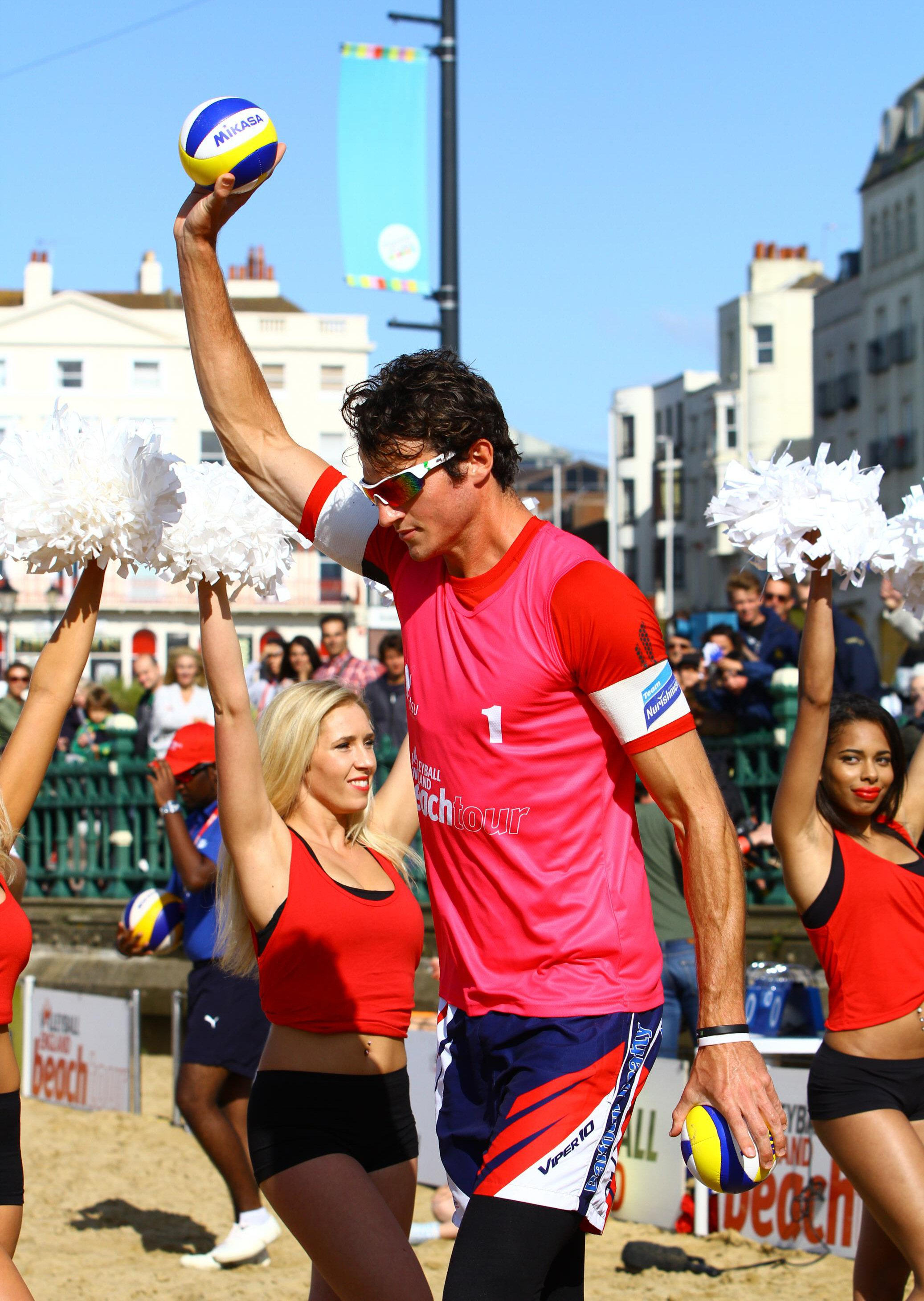
At the Margate Masters tournament.

The UK Beach Tour (UKBT) is the United Kingdom's national competition for beach volleyball players, coordinated in partnership with Volleyball England, Scottish Volleyball, and the Northern Irish Volleyball Federation. It was started in 2018 by Commonwealth Games Team England player Jake Shaef, and now delivers dozens of beach volleyball events annually at venues around the UK, catering for all levels of ability, from entry level to elite.

A Junior Tour was introduced in 2021, though experienced juniors can also play in adult events. The tournaments are organised by individuals and clubs, in line with UKBT guidance. Participant players are awarded points based on their ranking in UK and international tournaments, and these are coordinated into a national ranking system.

As well as Volleyball England, UKBT has partnerships with its ball sponsor, Wilson, and the disability charity My AFK.

== UKBT event structure ==
The following UKBT event structure is detailed in the UKBT Handbook:

- Junior Tour: These are events for players in the Under-14 and Under-18 age categories. They last 1–2 days.
- 1-Star, 2-Star and 3-Star tournaments: These are local events for mixed or single gender teams. They last 1–2 days.
- 4-Star tournaments: These 2-day events are aimed at "the UK’s top and developing players".
- 5-Star tournaments (Grand Slam Series): These 2-day events are aimed at elite players.
