= Daniel Dearing =

Canadian beach volleyball player (born 1990)

Personal information
- Born: January 13, 1990 (age 36) Toronto, Ontario, Canada
- Height: 198 cm (6 ft 6 in)

Sport
- Sport: Beach volleyball
Medal record
Men's Beach volleyball
Representing Canada
Commonwealth Games
Silver medal – second place	2022 Birmingham	Men's

Daniel Dearing (born January 13, 1990) is a Canadian volleyball athlete competing primarily in the beach discipline.

== Career ==
In November 2021, Dearing came out of a seven-year retirement and teamed up with Sam Schachter with the aim of qualifying for the 2024 Summer Olympics. In the summer of 2022, Dearing and Schachter won silver at the 2022 Commonwealth Games. At the 2022 NORCECA Beach Volleyball Tour Finals, Dearing and Schachter won the gold medal.

In June 2024, Dearing qualified to compete for Canada at the 2024 Summer Olympics.

== Personal life ==
Dearing is an alumnus of North Albion Collegiate Institute in Toronto and York University.
