= Sam Schachter =

Canadian beach volleyball player (born 1990)

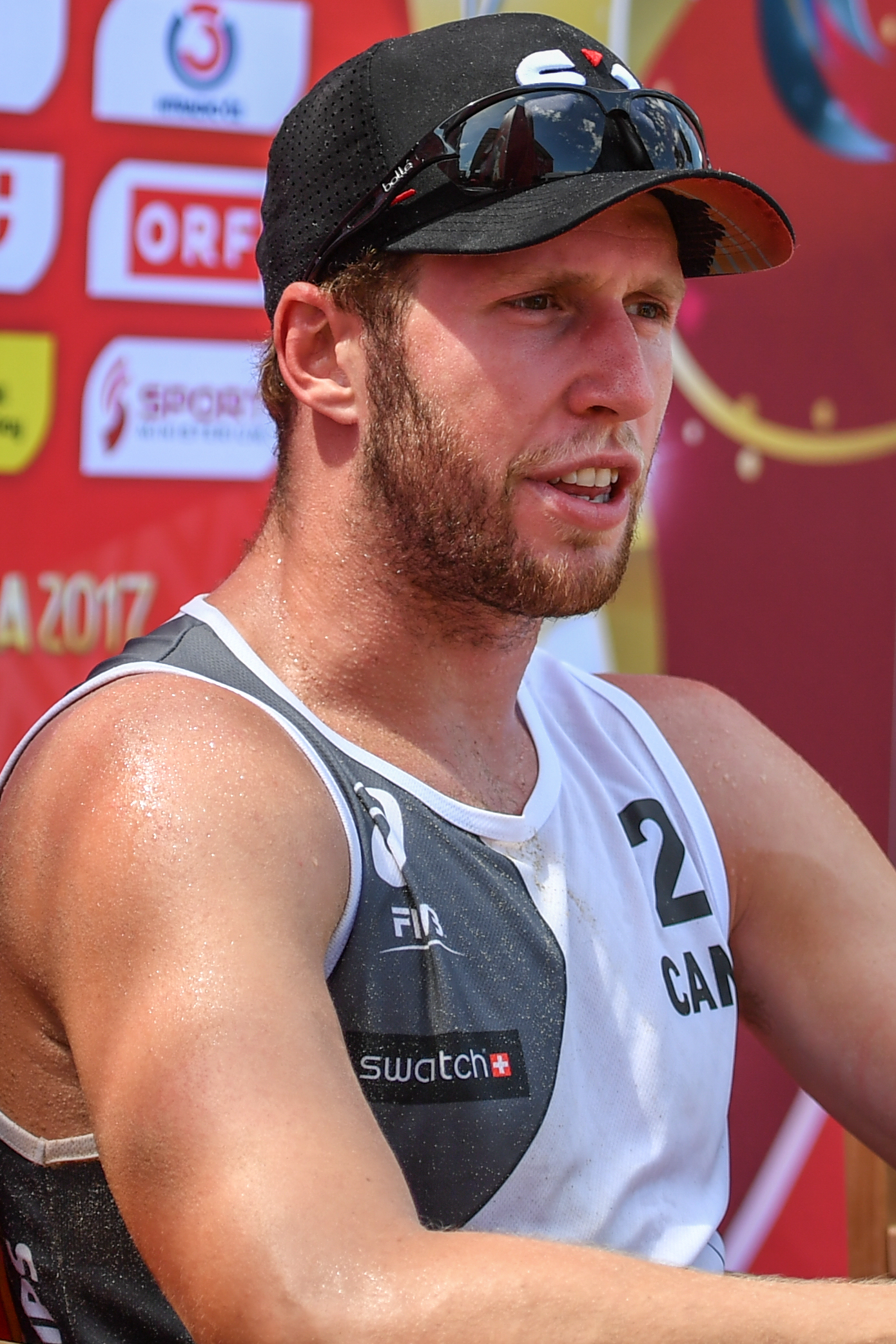
- Schachter at the 2017 Beach Volleyball World Championships in Vienna

Personal information
- Nickname: Sammy
- Nationality: Canada
- Born: May 8, 1990 (age 36); North York, Ontario, Canada
- Hometown: Richmond Hill, Ontario
- Height: 195 cm (6 ft 5 in)
- Weight: 80 kg (176 lb)
- Education: Wilfrid Laurier University

Beach volleyball information

Current teammate
Teammate
Daniel Dearing

Previous teammates
Teammate
Garrett May, Josh Binstock
Honours
Representing Canada
Commonwealth Games
Silver medal – second place	2022 Birmingham	Beach volleyball
Silver medal – second place	2018 Gold Coast	Beach volleyball
Maccabiah Games
Silver medal – second place	2013 Israel	Indoor

Samuel Schachter (born May 8, 1990) is a Canadian Olympic beach volleyball player. In 2010 he won the FIVB World Junior (U-21) Championship with Garrett May. He and partner Josh Binstock were 2014 Canadian national champions, and represented Canada at the 2015 Pan American Games and the 2016 Summer Olympics. At the 2018 Commonwealth Games, he and Binstock earned silver medals. He competed with partner Daniel Dearing at the 2024 Paris Olympics in the Men's tournament. In 2025 he partnered with Jonny Pickett and they recently competed together in the FIVB World Championships in Adelaide, Australia where they finished a strong 17th after a loss to number 1 seeds from Norway.

== Early and personal life ==
Schachter was born in North York, Ontario, lived in Richmond Hill, Ontario, now lives in Scarborough, Ontario, and is Jewish. His parents are Jon and Doris Schachter, and he has an older brother Nathan. He was married to former Canadian beach volleyball player Julie Gordon in September 2024.

He attended Westmount Collegiate Institute for high school. He earned his Bachelor of Arts in Communications Studies at Wilfrid Laurier University, competing for the Wilfrid Laurier Golden Hawks, with whom he was Ontario University Athletics 2009 Rookie of the Year and CIS All-Rookie Team.

He has coached the Toronto Varsity Blues, George Brown College, and York University men's volleyball teams.

== Volleyball career ==
=== 2010–2016; 2016 Rio Olympics ===
In 2010 he won the FIVB World Junior (U-21) Championship with Garrett May.

At the 2013 Maccabiah Games in Israel, he and his then-partner Josh Binstock playing for Team Canada won a silver medal in volleyball, losing the gold medal to the Israelis.

In 2014 he and Binstock were Canadian national champions. They also won a gold medal at the Parana Open, an FIVB (international volleyball federation) World Tour event. He was named the (U.S.) National Volleyball League (NVL) 2014 Best Defensive Player.

In 2015 they competed at the 2015 Pan American Games in Toronto, and finished 8th, after Schachter suffered a back injury prevented them from playing in the relegation round. They finished 9th at the 2015 FIVB Volleyball Men's World Championship. In June of that year they also came in second at the Major Series tournament in Poreč, Croatia, the first time a Canadian men's team had reached the podium in a major FIVB World Tour event since 1997. They competed in the 2015 FIVB World Championship, finishing ninth.

In May 2016, they finishing second at the FIVB Beach Volleyball Cincinnati Open.

Schachter competed along with Binstock at the 2016 Summer Olympics, where they came in 19th.

=== 2017–present; 2024 Paris Olympics ===
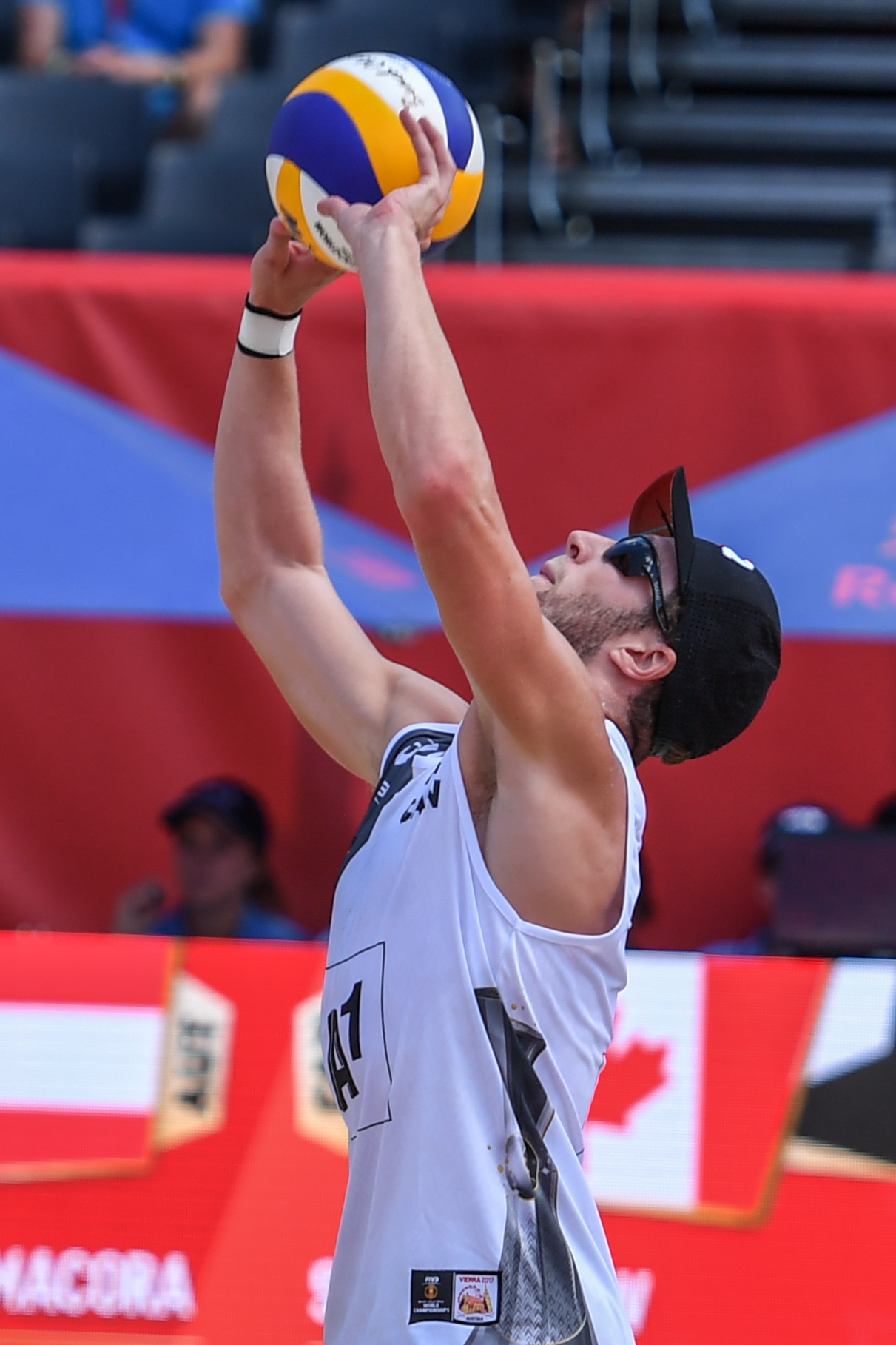
Schachter in 2017

At the 2018 Commonwealth Games, he and Sam Pedlow won the silver medal at Gold Coast.

Schachter and Daniel Dearing teamed up in 2022. They qualified for the 2022 FIVB World Championships. They then won the silver medal at the 2022 Commonwealth Games in Birmingham, England. Schachter and Dearing then won the 2022 NORCECA Beach Tour Final, in Punta Cana, Dominican Republic.

In September 2023, Schachter and Dearing earned a Beach Pro Tour victory together, at the Futures event in Halifax, Nova Scotia.

In June 2024 he and Dearing won the NORCECA Olympic Qualification Tournament in Tlaxcala, Mexico, winning all six matches in straight sets, qualifying them for the 2024 Paris Olympics.

At the Paris 2024 Olympics, in the Men's tournament, he and Dearing lost their first match 2-0 (21-17, 21-19) to reigning world champions Ondřej Perušič and David Schweiner of the Czech Republic at Eiffel Tower Stadium on the Champ de Mars.

== See also ==
- List of select Jewish volleyball players
