= FIVB Beach Volleyball World Rankings =

International beach volleyball rankings

The FIVB Beach Volleyball World Rankings is a ranking system for men's and women's national teams in beach volleyball. The teams of the member nations of the FIVB, beach volleyball and volleyball's world governing body, are ranked based on their competition results with the most successful teams being ranked highest.

The ranking is based on the 8 best results over the last 365 days. They are updated every Monday after an FIVB recognized event.

The rankings are used in international competitions to define the seeded teams and arrange them in pools. Specific procedures for seeding and pooling are established by the FIVB in each competition's formula.

== Rankings ==
=== Men ===
Top 20 Rankings as of September 14, 2026
Rank	Pair			Points
1	(Sweden)	Jacob Hölting Nilsson	Elmer Andersson	8,020
2	(Latvia)	Mārtiņš Pļaviņš	Kristians Fokerots	7,720
3	(Brazil)	Evandro Oliveira	Arthur Lanci	7,680
4	(France)	Rémi Daubas	Calvin Aye	7,420
5	(Norway)	Anders Mol	Christian Sørum	7,340
6	(Sweden)	David Åhman	Jonatan Hellvig	7,240
7	(France)	Téo Rotar	Arnaud Gauthier-Rat	6,460
8	(Austria)	Timo Hammarberg	Tim Berger	6,280
9	(Brazil)	André Stein	Renato Carvalho	6,160
10	(Argentina)	Nicolás Capogrosso	Tomás Capogrosso	5,720
10	(Norway)	Hendrik Mol	Mathias Berntsen	5,720
12	(Italy)	Samuele Cottafava	Gianluca Dal Corso	5,360
13	(Qatar)	Cherif Younousse	Ahmed Tijan	5,340
14	(Australia)	Mark Nicolaidis	Izac Carracher	5,320
14	(Chile)	Marco Grimalt	Esteban Grimalt	5,320
16	(France)	Elouan Chouikh	Joadel Genevieve-Gardoque	5,300
17	(Israel)	Eylon Elazar	Kevin Cuzmiciov	5,120
18	(Australia)	Thomas Hodges	Ben Hood	4,620
19	(United States)	Miles Evans	Chase Budinger	4,580
20	(Brazil)	George Wanderley	Saymon Barbosa	4,540

=== Women ===
Top 20 Rankings as of September 14, 2026
Rank	Pair			Points
1	(Brazil)	Carolina Solberg Salgado	Rebecca Cavalcante	8,780
2	(United States)	Kristen Cruz	Taryn Brasher	8,700
3	(Brazil)	Thâmela Galil	Victoria Lopes	7,700
4	(Netherlands)	Katja Stam	Raïsa Schoon	7,560
5	(Latvia)	Tīna Graudiņa	Anastasija Kravčenoka	7,500
6	(Canada)	Melissa Humana-Paredes	Brandie Wilkerson	6,920
7	(Germany)	Svenja Müller	Cinja Tillmann	6,220
8	(Italy)	Valentina Gottardi	Reka Orsi Toth	6,140
9	(Brazil)	Ana Patrícia Ramos	Duda Lisboa	5,860
10	(United States)	Julia Donlin	Lexy Denaburg	5,700
11	(United States)	Megan Kraft	Kelly Cheng	5,660
12	(Lithuania)	Monika Paulikienė	Ainė Raupelytė	5,320
12	(Switzerland)	Anouk Vergé-Dépré	Zoé Vergé-Dépré	5,320
14	(Brazil)	Taiana Lima	Talita Antunes	5,180
15	(United States)	Corinne Quiggle	Chloe Loreen	5,140
16	(Switzerland)	Nina Brunner	Tanja Hüberli	4,960
17	(France)	Clémence Vieira	Aline Chamereau	4,900
18	(China)	Xu Yan	Xia Xinyi	4,780
19	(Germany)	Sandra Ittlinger	Anna-Lena Grüne	4,716
20	(Switzerland)	Joana Mäder	Leona Kernen	4,640

== See also ==
- Beach volleyball at the 2008 Summer Olympics - Qualification for the rankings going into the 2008 Summer Olympics
