= Beach volleyball at the African Games =

- Beach volleyball
- Frequency: Every four years
- Inaugurated: 2011 (Mozambique) Maputo
- Most recent: 2023 (Ghana) Accra
- Best: Egypt (EGY)

Beach volleyball is an African Games event ever since the inaugural edition in Maputo, Mozambique, at the 2011 All-Africa Games, and has continued to feature prominently at the competition in each of its subsequent editions.

== Men ==
=== Results summary ===
Year	Host	Gold medal match			Bronze medal match			Teams
Year	Host	Gold medalists	Score	Silver medalists	Bronze medalists	Score	4th place	Teams
2011; Details	(Mozambique); Maputo	(South Africa); Freedom Chiya and Grant Goldschmidt	2–0	(Angola); Marcio Sequeira and Eden Sequeira	(Ghana); Ajamako Seidu and Evans Tagoe	2–0	(Nigeria); Kayode Ajilore and Goodluck Anyasodnke	12
2015; Details	(Republic of the Congo); Brazzaville	(Angola); Edson Figueiredo and Eden Sequeira	2–0	(Mozambique); Délcio Soares and Carlos Acácio	(South Africa); Clinton Stemmet and Leo Frank Williams	2–0	(Rwanda)... and ...	8
2019; Details	(Morocco); Rabat	(The Gambia); Sainey Jawo and Babou Jarra Mbye	2–1	(Morocco); Mohammed Abicha and Zouheir El Graoui	(Rwanda); Kavalo Patrick Akumuntu and Olivier Ntagengwa	2–1	(South Africa); Grant Goldschmidt and Leo Frank Williams	
2023; Details	(Ghana); Accra	(Morocco); Mohammed Abicha and Soufiane El Gharouti	2–0	(South Africa); Danilo von Ludwiger and Leo Frank Williams	(Botswana); George Chiswaniso and Jack Sekao Boifang	2–0	(Sierra Leone); Ahmed Junior Aruna and Musa Kamara	19

=== Medal table, men ===
- Last updated after the 2023 edition

Rank	Nation	Gold	Silver	Bronze	Total
1	South Africa (RSA)	1	1	1	3
2	Angola (ANG)	1	1	0	2
2	Morocco (MAR)	1	1	0	2
4	The Gambia (GAM)	1	0	0	1
5	Mozambique (MOZ)	0	1	0	1
6	Botswana (BOT)	0	0	1	1
6	Ghana (GHA)	0	0	1	1
6	Rwanda (RWA)	0	0	1	1
Totals (8 entries)		4	4	4	12

== Women ==
=== Results summary ===
Year	Host	Gold medal match			Bronze medal match			Teams
Year	Host	Gold medalists	Score	Silver medalists	Bronze medalists	Score	4th place	Teams
2011; Details	(Mozambique); Maputo	(Mauritius); Elodie Li Yuk Lo and Natacha Rigobert	2–0	(South Africa); Palesa Sekhenyana and Randy Williams	(Kenya); Margaret Indilara and Dorcas Ndasaba	2–0	(Nigeria); Agera Preiolla and Garba Mariam	11
2015; Details	(Republic of the Congo); Brazzaville	(Nigeria); Priscilla Agera and Isabella Laju	2–1	(South Africa); Palesa Masinga and Randy Williams	(Rwanda); Denyse Mutatsimpundu and Charlotte Nzayisenga	2–0	(Kenya)... and ...	8
2019; Details	(Morocco); Rabat	(Egypt); Farida Elaskalany and Doaa Elghobashy	2–0	(Kenya); Gaudencia Nakhumicha Makokha and Naomie Too	(Mozambique); Jéssica Moiane and Mércia Mucheza	2–0	(Mauritius); Liza Bonne and Orian Maita Cousin	
2023; Details	(Ghana); Accra	(Egypt); Doaa Elghobashy and Marwa Abdelhady	2–1	(Mozambique); Ana Sinaportar and Vanessa Muianga	(Nigeria); Esther Mbah and Pamela Bawa	2–0	(Rwanda); Benitha Mukandayisenga and Valentine Munezero	20

=== Medal table, women ===
- Last updated after the 2023 edition

Rank	Nation	Gold	Silver	Bronze	Total
1	Egypt (EGY)	2	0	0	2
2	Nigeria (NGR)	1	0	1	2
3	Mauritius (MRI)	1	0	0	1
4	South Africa (RSA)	0	2	0	2
5	Kenya (KEN)	0	1	1	2
5	Mozambique (MOZ)	0	1	1	2
7	Rwanda (RWA)	0	0	1	1
Totals (7 entries)		4	4	4	12

== Medal table, total ==
- Last updated after the 2023 edition

Rank	Nation	Gold	Silver	Bronze	Total
1	Egypt (EGY)	2	0	0	2
2	South Africa (RSA)	1	3	1	5
3	Angola (ANG)	1	1	0	2
3	Morocco (MAR)	1	1	0	2
5	Nigeria (NGR)	1	0	1	2
6	Mauritius (MRI)	1	0	0	1
6	The Gambia (GAM)	1	0	0	1
8	Mozambique (MOZ)	0	2	1	3
9	Kenya (KEN)	0	1	1	2
10	Rwanda (RWA)	0	0	2	2
11	Botswana (BOT)	0	0	1	1
11	Ghana (GHA)	0	0	1	1
Totals (12 entries)		8	8	8	24
