= African Beach Volleyball Championships =

Official competition for senior men's national beach volleyball teams of Africa

- Most recent season or competition: 2026 Men's African Nations Beach Volleyball Championship
- Sport: Beach Volleyball
- Founded: 2015; 11 years ago
- First season: 2015
- Continent: CAVB (Africa)
- Most recent champions: Morocco (5th title)
- Most titles: Morocco (5 titles)

The African Beach Volleyball Championship Tournament was first contested in 2015 in La Goulette, Tunis for both genders men and women.

== History ==
The African Volleyball Confederation (CAVB) hosts the African Beach Volleyball Championship, the continent's premier beach volleyball competition. Teams of two players compete on sand courts, in contrast to the sport's conventional indoor variant. It was founded in the early 2000s with the goal of advancing beach volleyball throughout the continent.

Both the men's and women's national teams compete in the competition, which was first conducted sporadically but has since grown to be a regular event in African sports. The competition has become more competitive, drawing elite athletes from nations like South Africa, Nigeria, Kenya, Morocco, and Mozambique. Additionally, it qualifies players for international tournaments such as the Olympic Games and the FIVB Beach Volleyball World Championships.

== Men's tournament ==
=== History ===
| Year | Location | Gold | Silver | Bronze |
|---|---|---|---|---|
| 2015; Details | La Goulette, Tunisia | (Tunisia); Mohamed Arafet Naceur / Choaib Belhaj Salah | (South Africa); Grant Goldschmidt / Leo Williams | (Ghana); Edward Seidu Ajanako / Scott |
| 2017; Details | Maputo, Mozambique | (Morocco); Mohamed Abicha / Zouheir El Graoui | (South Africa); Jamaine Naidoo / Leo Williams | (Mozambique); Aldevino Nguvo / João Tovela |
| 2019; Details | Abuja, Nigeria | (Morocco); Mohamed Abicha / Zouheir El Graoui | (Rwanda); Patrick Kavalo Akumuntu / Olivier Ntagengwa | (Mozambique); Aldevino Nguvo / Delcio Soares |
| 2022; Details | Agadir, Morocco | (Morocco); Mohamed Abicha / Zouheir El Graoui | (Mozambique); Ainadino Martinho / Jorge Monjane | (Mozambique); Jose Alberto Mondlane / Osvaldo Mungoi |
| 2025; Details | Martil, Morocco | (Morocco); Soufiane El Gharouti / Amine Sabir | (Morocco); Zouheir El Graoui / Iliyas Lazar | (Mozambique); Jose Alberto Mondlane / Osvaldo Mungoi |
| 2026; Details | Alexandria, Egypt | (Morocco); Soufiane El Gharouti / Zouheir El Graoui | (Algeria); Mohamed-Islem Kallouche / Ayyoub Dekkiche | (Tunisia); Amine Lengliz / Adem Elmeddeb |

=== Men, medals summary ===
| Rank | Nation | Gold | Silver | Bronze | Total |
|---|---|---|---|---|---|
| 1 | Morocco (MAR) | 5 | 1 | 0 | 6 |
| 2 | Tunisia (TUN) | 1 | 0 | 1 | 2 |
| 3 | South Africa (RSA) | 0 | 2 | 0 | 2 |
| 4 | Mozambique (MOZ) | 0 | 1 | 4 | 5 |
| 5 | Algeria (ALG) | 0 | 1 | 0 | 1 |
| 5 | Rwanda (RWA) | 0 | 1 | 0 | 1 |
| 7 | Ghana (GHA) | 0 | 0 | 1 | 1 |
| Totals (7 entries) | | 6 | 6 | 6 | 18 |

== Women's tournament ==
African Beach Volleyball Championships
- Most recent season or competition: 2025 Women's African Nations Beach Volleyball Championship
- Sport: Beach Volleyball
- Founded: 2015; 11 years ago
- First season: 2015
- Continent: CAVB (Africa)
- Most recent champions: Nigeria (1st title)
- Most titles: Morocco (3 titles)

=== History ===
| Year | Location | Gold | Silver | Bronze |
|---|---|---|---|---|
| 2015; Details | La Goulette, Tunisia | (Morocco); Ikram Ettayfi / Mahassine Siad | (Nigeria) ? / ? | (South Africa); Randy Williams / Palesa Sekhonyana |
| 2017; Details | Maputo, Mozambique | (Rwanda); Charlotte Nzayisenga / Denise Mutatsimpundu | (Morocco); Mahassine Siad / Imane Zeroual | (Kenya); Gaudencia Makokha / Naomie Too |
| 2019; Details | Abuja, Nigeria | (Egypt); Doaa Elghobashy / Farida El Askalany | (Mauritius); Liza Bonne / Nathalie Létendrie | (Rwanda); Charlotte Nzayisenga / Benitha Mukandayisenga |
| 2022; Details | Agadir, Morocco | (Morocco); Imane Zeroual / Nora Darrhar | (Morocco); Mahassine Siad / Imane Yakki | (Mozambique); Vanessa Muianga / Ana Sinaportar |
| 2025; Details | Martil, Morocco | (Morocco); Mahassine Siad / Dina El Ghazoui | (Mozambique); Vanessa Muianga / Mercia Mucheza | (Nigeria); Pamela Bawa / Esther Mbah |
| 2026; Details | Alexandria, Egypt | (Nigeria); Esther Mbah / Pamela Bawa | (Morocco); Alexandra Erhart / Nora Darrhar | (Mozambique); Vanessa Muianga / Ana Sinaportar |

=== Women, medals summary ===
| Rank | Nation | Gold | Silver | Bronze | Total |
|---|---|---|---|---|---|
| 1 | Morocco (MAR) | 3 | 3 | 0 | 6 |
| 2 | Nigeria (NGR) | 1 | 1 | 1 | 3 |
| 3 | Rwanda (RWA) | 1 | 0 | 1 | 2 |
| 4 | Egypt (EGY) | 1 | 0 | 0 | 1 |
| 5 | Mozambique (MOZ) | 0 | 1 | 2 | 3 |
| 6 | Mauritius (MRI) | 0 | 1 | 0 | 1 |
| 7 | Kenya (KEN) | 0 | 0 | 1 | 1 |
| 7 | South Africa (RSA) | 0 | 0 | 1 | 1 |
| Totals (8 entries) | | 6 | 6 | 6 | 18 |

== Total medal table ==
| Rank | Nation | Gold | Silver | Bronze | Total |
|---|---|---|---|---|---|
| 1 | Morocco (MAR) | 8 | 4 | 0 | 12 |
| 2 | Nigeria (NGR) | 1 | 1 | 1 | 3 |
| 2 | Rwanda (RWA) | 1 | 1 | 1 | 3 |
| 4 | Tunisia (TUN) | 1 | 0 | 1 | 2 |
| 5 | Egypt (EGY) | 1 | 0 | 0 | 1 |
| 6 | Mozambique (MOZ) | 0 | 2 | 6 | 8 |
| 7 | South Africa (RSA) | 0 | 2 | 1 | 3 |
| 8 | Algeria (ALG) | 0 | 1 | 0 | 1 |
| 8 | Mauritius (MRI) | 0 | 1 | 0 | 1 |
| 10 | Ghana (GHA) | 0 | 0 | 1 | 1 |
| 10 | Kenya (KEN) | 0 | 0 | 1 | 1 |
| Totals (11 entries) | | 12 | 12 | 12 | 36 |
