= Beach volleyball at the 2024 Summer Olympics – Men's tournament =

Men's beach volleyball at the Games of the XXXIII Olympiad
- Venue: Eiffel Tower Stadium Champ de Mars
- Dates: 27 July – 10 August
- Competitors: 48 from 18 nations
- Teams: 24

Medalists
1st place, gold medalist(s)		David Åhman; Jonatan Hellvig	Sweden
2nd place, silver medalist(s)		Nils Ehlers; Clemens Wickler	Germany
3rd place, bronze medalist(s)		Anders Mol; Christian Sørum	Norway

The men's beach volleyball tournament at the 2024 Olympic Games in Paris, France, took place at Eiffel Tower Stadium on the Champ de Mars. The competition was held from 27 July to 10 August 2024. Twenty four teams consisting of 48 athletes from 18 NOC's competed.

== Qualification ==
Qualification	Date	Host	Berths	Qualified NOC
Host nation	—		1	France
2023 FIVB Beach Volleyball World Championships	6–15 October 2023	(Mexico) Tlaxcala	1	Czech Republic
FIVB Beach Volleyball Olympic Ranking	9 June 2024	(Switzerland) Lausanne	17	Sweden
FIVB Beach Volleyball Olympic Ranking	9 June 2024	(Switzerland) Lausanne	17	Norway
FIVB Beach Volleyball Olympic Ranking	9 June 2024	(Switzerland) Lausanne	17	Germany
FIVB Beach Volleyball Olympic Ranking	9 June 2024	(Switzerland) Lausanne	17	Brazil
FIVB Beach Volleyball Olympic Ranking	9 June 2024	(Switzerland) Lausanne	17	United States
FIVB Beach Volleyball Olympic Ranking	9 June 2024	(Switzerland) Lausanne	17	Netherlands
FIVB Beach Volleyball Olympic Ranking	9 June 2024	(Switzerland) Lausanne	17	Brazil
FIVB Beach Volleyball Olympic Ranking	9 June 2024	(Switzerland) Lausanne	17	Italy
FIVB Beach Volleyball Olympic Ranking	9 June 2024	(Switzerland) Lausanne	17	Poland
FIVB Beach Volleyball Olympic Ranking	9 June 2024	(Switzerland) Lausanne	17	Netherlands
FIVB Beach Volleyball Olympic Ranking	9 June 2024	(Switzerland) Lausanne	17	Qatar
FIVB Beach Volleyball Olympic Ranking	9 June 2024	(Switzerland) Lausanne	17	United States
FIVB Beach Volleyball Olympic Ranking	9 June 2024	(Switzerland) Lausanne	17	Spain
FIVB Beach Volleyball Olympic Ranking	9 June 2024	(Switzerland) Lausanne	17	Italy
FIVB Beach Volleyball Olympic Ranking	9 June 2024	(Switzerland) Lausanne	17	Australia
FIVB Beach Volleyball Olympic Ranking	9 June 2024	(Switzerland) Lausanne	17	Cuba
FIVB Beach Volleyball Olympic Ranking	9 June 2024	(Switzerland) Lausanne	17	Austria
2023–2024 CEV Continental Cup Final	13–16 June 2024	(Latvia) Jūrmala	1	France
2023–2024 CAVB Continental Cup Final	20–23 June 2024	Martil	1	Morocco
2023–2024 AVC Continental Cup Final	21–23 June 2024	(China) Ningbo	1	Australia
2023–2024 CSV Continental Cup Final	21–23 June 2024	(Chile) Iquique	1	Chile
2023–2024 NORCECA Continental Cup Final	21–23 June 2024	Tlaxcala	1	Canada
Total			24	

== Format ==
The 24 teams were split into six pools of four teams. After a round-robin the top two teams and the two best third-placed teams advanced to the knockout stage. The other four third-placed teams played in a "lucky loser" round to determine the last two qualifying teams. From there on, a knockout stage was used.

A win was awarded two match points, while a loss was awarded one match point. In the case of a tie in match points, the following tiebreaker criteria was used: Between two teams:

- Higher rally points ratio in all matches.
- If still tied, winner of head-to-head match.

Between three teams:

- Higher rally points ratio in matches between tied teams.
- If still tied, higher rally points ratio in all matches.
- If still tied, the higher tournament seeding established at the General Technical Meeting.

== Competition schedule ==
The schedule was as follows.

P	Preliminary round	LL	Lucky losers playoffs	1/8	Round of 16	¼	Quarterfinals	½	Semifinals	B	Bronze medal match	F	Final

Sat 27	Sun 28	Mon 29	Tue 30	Wed 31	Thu 1	Fri 2	Sat 3		Sun 4	Mon 5	Tue 6	Wed 7	Thu 8	Fri 9	Sat 10	
P	P	P	P	P	P	P	P	LL	1/8	1/8	¼	¼	½		B	F

== Teams ==
24 teams qualified. The first 18 teams were announced on 11 June 2024. Each NOC is limited to two teams. The final places were revealed on 24 June 2024.

Team	NOC
Thomas Hodges – Zachery Schubert	Australia
Mark Nicolaidis – Izac Carracher	Australia
Julian Hörl – Alexander Horst	Austria
Evandro Oliveira – Arthur Lanci	Brazil
George Wanderley – André Stein	Brazil
Sam Schachter – Daniel Dearing	Canada
Marco Grimalt – Esteban Grimalt	Chile
Jorge Alayo – Noslen Díaz	Cuba
Ondřej Perušič – David Schweiner	Czech Republic
Youssef Krou – Arnaud Gauthier-Rat	France
Rémi Bassereau – Julien Lyneel	France
Nils Ehlers – Clemens Wickler	Germany
Samuele Cottafava – Paolo Nicolai	Italy
Alex Ranghieri – Adrian Carambula	Italy
Mohamed Abicha – Zouheir El Graoui	Morocco
Stefan Boermans – Yorick de Groot	Netherlands
Matthew Immers – Steven van de Velde	Netherlands
Anders Mol – Christian Sørum	Norway
Michał Bryl – Bartosz Łosiak	Poland
Cherif Younousse – Ahmed Tijan	Qatar
Pablo Herrera – Adrián Gavira	Spain
David Åhman – Jonatan Hellvig	Sweden
Miles Evans – Chase Budinger	United States
Miles Partain – Andrew Benesh	United States

== Draw ==
The draw was held on 28 June.

Pool A	Pool B	Pool C
Åhman – Hellvig (SWE)	Mol A. – Sørum C. (NOR)	Ehlers – Wickler (GER)
Cottafava – Nicolai (ITA)	Van de Velde – Immers (NED)	Bryl – Łosiak (POL)
Cherif – Ahmed (QAT)	Ranghieri – Carambula (ITA)	Hodges – Schubert (AUS)
Nicolaidis – Carracher (AUS)	Grimalt M. – Grimalt E. (CHI)	Bassereau – Lyneel (FRA)

Pool D	Pool E	Pool F
George – André (BRA)	Perušič – Schweiner (CZE)	Krou – Gauthier-Rat (FRA)
Partain – Benesh (USA)	Evandro – Arthur (BRA)	Boermans – de Groot (NED)
Díaz – Alayo (CUB)	Hörl – Horst (AUT)	Herrera – Gavira (ESP)
Abicha – Elgraoui (MAR)	Schachter – Dearing (CAN)	Evans – Budinger (USA)

== Referees ==
The following referees were selected for the tournament.

- (Argentina) Osvaldo Sumavil
- (Brazil) Giseli Amantino
- (Canada) Brian Hiebert
- (China) Wang Lijun
- (Colombia) Juan Carlos Saavedra
- (France) Sylvain Druart
- (Greece) Charalampos Papadogoulas
- (Italy) Davide Crescentini
- (Japan) Mariko Satomi
- (Poland) Agnieszka Myszkowska
- (Portugal) Rui Carvalho
- (Rwanda) Jean Mukundiyukuri
- (Serbia) Robert Leko
- (South Africa) Giovanni Bake
- (Spain) José María Padrón
- (United States) Brigham Beatie

== Preliminary round ==
The schedule was announced on 4 July 2024.

All times are local (UTC+2).

=== Pool A ===
Pos	Team	Pld	W	L	Pts	SW	SL	SR	SPW	SPL	SPR	Qualification
1	Cherif – Ahmed (QAT)	3	3	0	6	6	1	6.000	140	127	1.102	Round of 16
2	Cottafava – Nicolai (ITA)	3	2	1	5	4	2	2.000	124	118	1.051	Round of 16
3	Åhman – Hellvig (SWE)	3	1	2	4	3	4	0.750	139	134	1.037	Round of 16
4	Nicolaidis – Carracher (AUS)	3	0	3	3	0	6	0.000	102	126	0.810	

Source: FIVB

27 July 2024; 15:00	Åhman – Hellvig (Sweden)	2–0	(Australia) Nicolaidis – Carracher	Eiffel Tower Stadium Champ de Mars, Paris; Attendance: 10,516; Referees: Brian Hiebert (CAN), Robert Leko (SRB)
27 July 2024; 15:00	(21–14, 21–19); Report			Eiffel Tower Stadium Champ de Mars, Paris; Attendance: 10,516; Referees: Brian Hiebert (CAN), Robert Leko (SRB)

27 July 2024; 23:00	Cottafava – Nicolai (Italy)	0–2	(Qatar) Cherif – Ahmed	Eiffel Tower Stadium Champ de Mars, Paris; Attendance: 10,314; Referees: Brigham Beatie (USA), Wang Lijun (CHN)
27 July 2024; 23:00	(19–21, 18–21); Report			Eiffel Tower Stadium Champ de Mars, Paris; Attendance: 10,314; Referees: Brigham Beatie (USA), Wang Lijun (CHN)

29 July 2024; 09:00	Cottafava – Nicolai (Italy)	2–0	(Australia) Nicolaidis – Carracher	Eiffel Tower Stadium Champ de Mars, Paris; Attendance: 8,651; Referees: José Padron (ESP), Jean Mukundiyukuri (RWA)
29 July 2024; 09:00	(21–19, 21–18); Report			Eiffel Tower Stadium Champ de Mars, Paris; Attendance: 8,651; Referees: José Padron (ESP), Jean Mukundiyukuri (RWA)

29 July 2024; 20:00	Åhman – Hellvig (Sweden)	1–2	(Qatar) Cherif – Ahmed	Eiffel Tower Stadium Champ de Mars, Paris; Attendance: 10,023; Referees: Osvaldo Sumavil (ARG), Wang Lijun (CHN)
29 July 2024; 20:00	(21–15, 19–21, 18–20); Report			Eiffel Tower Stadium Champ de Mars, Paris; Attendance: 10,023; Referees: Osvaldo Sumavil (ARG), Wang Lijun (CHN)

1 August 2024; 10:00	Cherif – Ahmed (Qatar)	2–0	(Australia) Nicolaidis – Carracher	Eiffel Tower Stadium Champ de Mars, Paris; Attendance: 9,949; Referees: Rui Carvalho (POR), Davide Crescentini (ITA)
1 August 2024; 10:00	(21–14, 21–18); Report			Eiffel Tower Stadium Champ de Mars, Paris; Attendance: 9,949; Referees: Rui Carvalho (POR), Davide Crescentini (ITA)

1 August 2024; 17:00	Åhman – Hellvig (Sweden)	0–2	(Italy) Cottafava – Nicolai	Eiffel Tower Stadium Champ de Mars, Paris; Attendance: 10,808; Referees: Brigham Beatie (USA), Juan Saavedra (COL)
1 August 2024; 17:00	(22–24, 17–21); Report			Eiffel Tower Stadium Champ de Mars, Paris; Attendance: 10,808; Referees: Brigham Beatie (USA), Juan Saavedra (COL)

=== Pool B ===
Pos	Team	Pld	W	L	Pts	SW	SL	SR	SPW	SPL	SPR	Qualification
1	Mol – Sørum (NOR)	3	3	0	6	6	0	MAX	126	92	1.370	Round of 16
2	Van de Velde – Immers (NED)	3	1 (Note: NED 1.055 points ratio, CHI 1.013, ITA 0.939.)	2	4	3	4	0.750	131	133	0.985	Round of 16
3	M. Grimalt – E. Grimalt (CHI)	3	1	2	4	2	4	0.500	109	120	0.908	Lucky losers
4	Ranghieri – Carambula (ITA)	3	1	2	4	2	5	0.400	119	140	0.850	

Source: FIVB
Notes:

28 July 2024; 10:00	Van de Velde – Immers (Netherlands)	1–2	(Italy) Ranghieri – Carambula	Eiffel Tower Stadium Champ de Mars, Paris; Attendance: 10,149; Referees: Robert Leko (SRB), Jean Mukundiyukuri (RWA)
28 July 2024; 10:00	(20–22, 21–19, 13–15); Report			Eiffel Tower Stadium Champ de Mars, Paris; Attendance: 10,149; Referees: Robert Leko (SRB), Jean Mukundiyukuri (RWA)

28 July 2024; 21:00	Mol – Sørum (Norway)	2–0	(Chile) M. Grimalt – E. Grimalt	Eiffel Tower Stadium Champ de Mars, Paris; Attendance: 10,402; Referees: Brigham Beatie (USA), Giseli Amantino (BRA)
28 July 2024; 21:00	(21–14, 21–16); Report			Eiffel Tower Stadium Champ de Mars, Paris; Attendance: 10,402; Referees: Brigham Beatie (USA), Giseli Amantino (BRA)

31 July 2024; 16:00	Van de Velde – Immers (Netherlands)	2–0	(Chile) M. Grimalt – E. Grimalt	Eiffel Tower Stadium Champ de Mars, Paris; Attendance: 10,606; Referees: Osvaldo Sumavil (ARG), Brigham Beatie (USA)
31 July 2024; 16:00	(21–19, 21–16); Report			Eiffel Tower Stadium Champ de Mars, Paris; Attendance: 10,606; Referees: Osvaldo Sumavil (ARG), Brigham Beatie (USA)

31 July 2024; 22:30	Mol – Sørum (Norway)	2–0	(Italy) Ranghieri – Carambula	Eiffel Tower Stadium Champ de Mars, Paris; Attendance: 10,666; Referees: Wang Lijun (CHN), Brian Hiebert (CAN)
31 July 2024; 22:30	(21–12, 21–15); Report			Eiffel Tower Stadium Champ de Mars, Paris; Attendance: 10,666; Referees: Wang Lijun (CHN), Brian Hiebert (CAN)

2 August 2024; 10:00	Ranghieri – Carambula (Italy)	0–2	(Chile) M. Grimalt – E. Grimalt	Eiffel Tower Stadium Champ de Mars, Paris; Attendance: 10,201; Referees: Rui Carvalho (POR), Brian Hiebert (CAN)
2 August 2024; 10:00	(15–21, 21–23); Report			Eiffel Tower Stadium Champ de Mars, Paris; Attendance: 10,201; Referees: Rui Carvalho (POR), Brian Hiebert (CAN)

2 August 2024; 20:00	Mol – Sørum (Norway)	2–0	(Netherlands) Van de Velde – Immers	Eiffel Tower Stadium Champ de Mars, Paris; Attendance: 9,944; Referees: Juan Saavedra (COL), Agnieszka Myszkowska (POL)
2 August 2024; 20:00	(21–16, 21–19); Report			Eiffel Tower Stadium Champ de Mars, Paris; Attendance: 9,944; Referees: Juan Saavedra (COL), Agnieszka Myszkowska (POL)

=== Pool C ===
Pos	Team	Pld	W	L	Pts	SW	SL	SR	SPW	SPL	SPR	Qualification
1	Ehlers – Wickler (GER)	3	3	0	6	6	1	6.000	140	122	1.148	Round of 16
2	Bryl – Łosiak (POL)	3	2	1	5	4	2	2.000	118	107	1.103	Round of 16
3	Hodges – Schubert (AUS)	3	1	2	4	3	4	0.750	131	134	0.978	Lucky losers
4	Bassereau – Lyneel (FRA)	3	0	3	3	0	6	0.000	101	127	0.795	

Source: FIVB

30 July 2024; 09:00	Bryl – Łosiak (Poland)	2–0	(Australia) Hodges – Schubert	Eiffel Tower Stadium Champ de Mars, Paris; Attendance: 9,591; Referees: Rui Carvalho (POR), Jean Mukundiyukuri (RWA)
30 July 2024; 09:00	(21–16, 21–16); Report			Eiffel Tower Stadium Champ de Mars, Paris; Attendance: 9,591; Referees: Rui Carvalho (POR), Jean Mukundiyukuri (RWA)

30 July 2024; 10:00	Ehlers – Wickler (Germany)	2–0	(France) Bassereau – Lyneel	Eiffel Tower Stadium Champ de Mars, Paris; Attendance: 10,233; Referees: José Padrón (ESP), Robert Leko (SRB)
30 July 2024; 10:00	(21–15, 21–17); Report			Eiffel Tower Stadium Champ de Mars, Paris; Attendance: 10,233; Referees: José Padrón (ESP), Robert Leko (SRB)

1 August 2024; 09:00	Ehlers – Wickler (Germany)	2–1	(Australia) Hodges – Schubert	Eiffel Tower Stadium Champ de Mars, Paris; Attendance: 7,795; Referees: Robert Leko (SRB), Giovanni Bake (RSA)
1 August 2024; 09:00	(16–21, 21–18, 19–17); Report			Eiffel Tower Stadium Champ de Mars, Paris; Attendance: 7,795; Referees: Robert Leko (SRB), Giovanni Bake (RSA)

1 August 2024; 21:00	Bryl – Łosiak (Poland)	2–0	(France) Bassereau – Lyneel	Eiffel Tower Stadium Champ de Mars, Paris; Attendance: 10,099; Referees: Juan Saavedra (COL), Wang Lijun (CHN)
1 August 2024; 21:00	(21–15, 21–18); Report			Eiffel Tower Stadium Champ de Mars, Paris; Attendance: 10,099; Referees: Juan Saavedra (COL), Wang Lijun (CHN)

3 August 2024; 09:00	Ehlers – Wickler (Germany)	2–0	(Poland) Bryl – Łosiak	Eiffel Tower Stadium Champ de Mars, Paris; Attendance: 8,849; Referees: Charalampos Papadogoulas (GRE), Sylvain Druart (FRA)
3 August 2024; 09:00	(21–19, 21–15); Report			Eiffel Tower Stadium Champ de Mars, Paris; Attendance: 8,849; Referees: Charalampos Papadogoulas (GRE), Sylvain Druart (FRA)

3 August 2024; 10:00	Hodges – Schubert (Australia)	2–0	(France) Bassereau – Lyneel	Eiffel Tower Stadium Champ de Mars, Paris; Attendance: 10,525; Referees: Rui Carvalho (POR), Brian Hiebert (CAN)
3 August 2024; 10:00	(21–16, 22–20); Report			Eiffel Tower Stadium Champ de Mars, Paris; Attendance: 10,525; Referees: Rui Carvalho (POR), Brian Hiebert (CAN)

=== Pool D ===
Pos	Team	Pld	W	L	Pts	SW	SL	SR	SPW	SPL	SPR	Qualification
1	Díaz – Alayo (CUB)	3	3	0	6	6	0	MAX	126	92	1.370	Round of 16
2	Partain – Benesh (USA)	3	2	1	5	4	3	1.333	135	126	1.071	Round of 16
3	George – André (BRA)	3	1	2	4	3	4	0.750	119	120	0.992	Round of 16
4	Abicha – El Graoui (MAR)	3	0	3	3	0	6	0.000	91	133	0.684	

Source: FIVB

27 July 2024; 14:00	Partain – Benesh (United States)	0–2	(Cuba) Díaz – Alayo	Eiffel Tower Stadium Champ de Mars, Paris; Attendance: 10,516; Referees: Davide Crescentini (ITA), Giovanni Bake (RSA)
27 July 2024; 14:00	(18–21, 18–21); Report			Eiffel Tower Stadium Champ de Mars, Paris; Attendance: 10,516; Referees: Davide Crescentini (ITA), Giovanni Bake (RSA)

27 July 2024; 19:00	George – André (Brazil)	2–0	(Morocco) Abicha – El Graoui	Eiffel Tower Stadium Champ de Mars, Paris; Attendance: 10,250; Referees: Sylvain Druart (FRA), Charalampos Papadogoulas (GRE)
27 July 2024; 19:00	(21–18, 21–10); Report			Eiffel Tower Stadium Champ de Mars, Paris; Attendance: 10,250; Referees: Sylvain Druart (FRA), Charalampos Papadogoulas (GRE)

30 July 2024; 12:00	George – André (Brazil)	0–2	(Cuba) Díaz – Alayo	Eiffel Tower Stadium Champ de Mars, Paris; Attendance: 10,590; Referees: Charalampos Papadogoulas (GRE), Mariko Satomi (JPN)
30 July 2024; 12:00	(13–21, 18–21); Report			Eiffel Tower Stadium Champ de Mars, Paris; Attendance: 10,590; Referees: Charalampos Papadogoulas (GRE), Mariko Satomi (JPN)

30 July 2024; 15:00	Partain – Benesh (United States)	2–0	(Morocco) Abicha – El Graoui	Eiffel Tower Stadium Champ de Mars, Paris; Attendance: 10,226; Referees: Jean Mukundiyukuri (RWA), Robert Leko (SRB)
30 July 2024; 15:00	(21–12, 28–26); Report			Eiffel Tower Stadium Champ de Mars, Paris; Attendance: 10,226; Referees: Jean Mukundiyukuri (RWA), Robert Leko (SRB)

1 August 2024; 12:00	Díaz – Alayo (Cuba)	2–0	(Morocco) Abicha – El Graoui	Eiffel Tower Stadium Champ de Mars, Paris; Attendance: 10,697; Referees: Giovanni Bake (RSA), Mariko Satomi (JPN)
1 August 2024; 12:00	(21–14, 21–11); Report			Eiffel Tower Stadium Champ de Mars, Paris; Attendance: 10,697; Referees: Giovanni Bake (RSA), Mariko Satomi (JPN)

1 August 2024; 15:00	George – André (Brazil)	1–2	(United States) Partain – Benesh	Eiffel Tower Stadium Champ de Mars, Paris; Attendance: 10,107; Referees: Charalampos Papadogoulas (GRE), Davide Crescentini (ITA)
1 August 2024; 15:00	(17–21, 21–14, 8–15); Report			Eiffel Tower Stadium Champ de Mars, Paris; Attendance: 10,107; Referees: Charalampos Papadogoulas (GRE), Davide Crescentini (ITA)

=== Pool E ===
Pos	Team	Pld	W	L	Pts	SW	SL	SR	SPW	SPL	SPR	Qualification
1	Evandro – Arthur (BRA)	3	3	0	6	6	0	MAX	126	100	1.260	Round of 16
2	Perušič – Schweiner (CZE)	3	2	1	5	4	2	2.000	118	109	1.083	Round of 16
3	Schachter – Dearing (CAN)	3	1	2	4	2	4	0.500	107	115	0.930	Lucky losers
4	Hörl – Horst (AUT)	3	0	3	3	0	6	0.000	99	126	0.786	

Source: FIVB

28 July 2024; 17:00	Perušič – Schweiner (Czech Republic)	2–0	(Canada) Schachter – Dearing	Eiffel Tower Stadium Champ de Mars, Paris; Attendance: 10,779; Referees: Wang Lijun (CHN), Osvaldo Sumavil (ARG)
28 July 2024; 17:00	(21–17, 21–19); Report			Eiffel Tower Stadium Champ de Mars, Paris; Attendance: 10,779; Referees: Wang Lijun (CHN), Osvaldo Sumavil (ARG)

28 July 2024; 20:00	Evandro – Arthur (Brazil)	2–0	(Austria) Hörl – Horst	Eiffel Tower Stadium Champ de Mars, Paris; Attendance: 6,092; Referees: Brian Hiebert (CAN), Sylvain Druart (FRA)
28 July 2024; 20:00	(21–18, 21–19); Report			Eiffel Tower Stadium Champ de Mars, Paris; Attendance: 6,092; Referees: Brian Hiebert (CAN), Sylvain Druart (FRA)

31 July 2024; 09:00	Perušič – Schweiner (Czech Republic)	2–0	(Austria) Hörl – Horst	Eiffel Tower Stadium Champ de Mars, Paris; Attendance: 8,829; Referees: Charalampos Papadogulas (GRE), José Padron (ESP)
31 July 2024; 09:00	(21–18, 21–13); Report			Eiffel Tower Stadium Champ de Mars, Paris; Attendance: 8,829; Referees: Charalampos Papadogulas (GRE), José Padron (ESP)

31 July 2024; 20:30	Evandro – Arthur (Brazil)	2–0	(Canada) Schachter – Dearing	Eiffel Tower Stadium Champ de Mars, Paris; Attendance: 9,585; Referees: Juan Saavedra (COL), Sylvain Druart (FRA)
31 July 2024; 20:30	(21–13, 21–16); Report			Eiffel Tower Stadium Champ de Mars, Paris; Attendance: 9,585; Referees: Juan Saavedra (COL), Sylvain Druart (FRA)

2 August 2024; 11:00	Hörl – Horst (Austria)	0–2	(Canada) Schachter – Dearing	Eiffel Tower Stadium Champ de Mars, Paris; Attendance: 10,640; Referees: Davide Crescentini (ITA), Sylvain Druart (FRA)
2 August 2024; 11:00	(16–21, 15–21); Report			Eiffel Tower Stadium Champ de Mars, Paris; Attendance: 10,640; Referees: Davide Crescentini (ITA), Sylvain Druart (FRA)

2 August 2024; 21:00	Perušič – Schweiner (Czech Republic)	0–2	(Brazil) Evandro – Arthur	Eiffel Tower Stadium Champ de Mars, Paris; Attendance: 10,797; Referees: José Padron (ESP), Jean Mukundiyukuri (RWA)
2 August 2024; 21:00	(18–21, 16–21); Report			Eiffel Tower Stadium Champ de Mars, Paris; Attendance: 10,797; Referees: José Padron (ESP), Jean Mukundiyukuri (RWA)

=== Pool F ===
Pos	Team	Pld	W	L	Pts	SW	SL	SR	SPW	SPL	SPR	Qualification
1	Boermans – De Groot (NED)	3	3	0	6	6	0	MAX	126	89	1.416	Round of 16
2	Herrera – Gavira (ESP)	3	2	1	5	4	3	1.333	131	123	1.065	Round of 16
3	Evans – Budinger (USA)	3	1	2	4	2	4	0.500	99	109	0.908	Lucky losers
4	Krou – Gauthier-Rat (FRA)	3	0	3	3	1	6	0.167	108	143	0.755	

Source: FIVB

29 July 2024; 10:00	Boermans – De Groot (Netherlands)	2–0	(Spain) Herrera – Gavira	Eiffel Tower Stadium Champ de Mars, Paris; Attendance: 10,732; Referees: Juan Saavedra (COL), Charalampos Papadogoulas (GRE)
29 July 2024; 10:00	(21–15, 21–15); Report			Eiffel Tower Stadium Champ de Mars, Paris; Attendance: 10,732; Referees: Juan Saavedra (COL), Charalampos Papadogoulas (GRE)

29 July 2024; 16:00	Krou – Gauthier-Rat (France)	0–2	(United States) Evans – Budinger	Eiffel Tower Stadium Champ de Mars, Paris; Attendance: 10,820; Referees: Davide Crescentini (ITA), Brian Hiebert (CAN)
29 July 2024; 16:00	(14–21, 11–21); Report			Eiffel Tower Stadium Champ de Mars, Paris; Attendance: 10,820; Referees: Davide Crescentini (ITA), Brian Hiebert (CAN)

30 July 2024; 17:00	Krou – Gauthier-Rat (France)	1–2	(Spain) Herrera – Gavira	Eiffel Tower Stadium Champ de Mars, Paris; Attendance: 10,854; Referees: Brigham Beatie (USA), Giseli Amantino (BRA)
30 July 2024; 17:00	(21–23, 23–21, 8–15); Report			Eiffel Tower Stadium Champ de Mars, Paris; Attendance: 10,854; Referees: Brigham Beatie (USA), Giseli Amantino (BRA)

30 July 2024; 20:00	Boermans – De Groot (Netherlands)	2–0	(United States) Evans – Budinger	Eiffel Tower Stadium Champ de Mars, Paris; Attendance: 10,329; Referees: Brian Hiebert (CAN), Osvaldo Sumavil (ARG)
30 July 2024; 20:00	(21–13, 21–15); Report			Eiffel Tower Stadium Champ de Mars, Paris; Attendance: 10,329; Referees: Brian Hiebert (CAN), Osvaldo Sumavil (ARG)

2 August 2024; 15:00	Herrera – Gavira (Spain)	2–0	(United States) Evans – Budinger	Eiffel Tower Stadium Champ de Mars, Paris; Attendance: 10,073; Referees: Charalampos Papadogoulas (GRE), Sylvain Druart (FRA)
2 August 2024; 15:00	(21–18, 21–11); Report			Eiffel Tower Stadium Champ de Mars, Paris; Attendance: 10,073; Referees: Charalampos Papadogoulas (GRE), Sylvain Druart (FRA)

2 August 2024; 16:00	Krou – Gauthier-Rat (France)	0–2	(Netherlands) Boermans – De Groot	Eiffel Tower Stadium Champ de Mars, Paris; Attendance: 10,767; Referees: Osvaldo Sumavil (ARG), Brigham Beatie (USA)
2 August 2024; 16:00	(15–21, 16–21); Report			Eiffel Tower Stadium Champ de Mars, Paris; Attendance: 10,767; Referees: Osvaldo Sumavil (ARG), Brigham Beatie (USA)

=== Lucky losers ===
The table below shows the ranking of third-placed teams in the preliminary round. The top two teams will advance to next round automatically. The other teams will compete for the two remaining spots. The third-ranked team will play the sixth-ranked team, and the fourth-ranked team will play the fifth-ranked team.

Pos	Grp	Team	Pld	W	L	Pts	SW	SL	SR	SPW	SPL	SPR	Qualification
1	A	Åhman – Hellvig (SWE)	3	1	2	4	3	4	0.750	139	134	1.037	Round of 16
2	D	George – André (BRA)	3	1	2	4	3	4	0.750	119	120	0.992	Round of 16
3	C	Hodges – Schubert (AUS)	3	1	2	4	3	4	0.750	131	134	0.978	Lucky loser playoffs
4	E	Schachter – Dearing (CAN)	3	1	2	4	2	4	0.500	107	115	0.930	Lucky loser playoffs
5	B	M. Grimalt – E. Grimalt (CHI)	3	1	2	4	2	4	0.500	109	120	0.908	Lucky loser playoffs
6	F	Evans – Budinger (USA)	3	1	2	4	2	4	0.500	99	109	0.908	Lucky loser playoffs

Source: FIVB

==== Lucky loser playoffs ====
3 August 2024; 18:00	Schachter – Dearing (Canada)	0–2 (retired)	(Chile) M. Grimalt – E. Grimalt	Eiffel Tower Stadium Champ de Mars, Paris; Attendance: 10,659; Referees: José Padron (ESP), Osvaldo Sumavil (ARG)
3 August 2024; 18:00	(1–21, 0–21); Report			Eiffel Tower Stadium Champ de Mars, Paris; Attendance: 10,659; Referees: José Padron (ESP), Osvaldo Sumavil (ARG)

3 August 2024; 23:00	Hodges – Schubert (Australia)	0–2	(United States) Evans – Budinger	Eiffel Tower Stadium Champ de Mars, Paris; Attendance: 10,852; Referees: José Padron (ESP), Jean Mukundiyukuri (RWA)
3 August 2024; 23:00	(19–21, 17–21); Report			Eiffel Tower Stadium Champ de Mars, Paris; Attendance: 10,852; Referees: José Padron (ESP), Jean Mukundiyukuri (RWA)

== Knockout stage ==
The round of sixteen pair up will be determined by drawing of lots. The six first ranked teams in preliminary pools are separated automatically. Then, the lucky loser playoffs winners will be drawn. The two best third ranked will be drawn next. And, the last drawing belongs to the second ranked teams. The teams in the same pool from preliminary round can not meet in round of 16.

=== Bracket ===
Round of 16
5 August
Cherif – Ahmed (QAT)	2
M. Grimalt – E. Grimalt (CHI)	0
5 August
Partain – Benesh (USA)	2
Cottafava – Nicolai (ITA)	0
4 August
Evandro – Arthur (BRA)	2
Van de Velde – Immers (NED)	0
4 August
Åhman – Hellvig (SWE)	2
Díaz – Alayo (CUB)	1
4 August
Ehlers – Wickler (GER)	2
George – André (BRA)	0
4 August
Perušič – Schweiner (CZE)	0
Boermans – De Groot (NED)	2
5 August
Bryl – Łosiak (POL)	0
Herrera – Gavira (ESP)	2
5 August
Evans – Budinger (USA)	0
Mol – Sørum (NOR)	2

Quarter-finals
7 August
Cherif – Ahmed (QAT)	2
Partain – Benesh (USA)	0
6 August
Evandro – Arthur (BRA)	0
Åhman – Hellvig (SWE)	2
6 August
Ehlers – Wickler (GER)	2
Boermans – De Groot (NED)	0
7 August
Herrera – Gavira (ESP)	0
Mol – Sørum (NOR)	2

Semi-finals
8 August
Cherif – Ahmed (QAT)	0
Åhman – Hellvig (SWE)	2
8 August
Ehlers – Wickler (GER)	2
Mol – Sørum (NOR)	1

Gold medal
10 August
Åhman – Hellvig (SWE)	2
Ehlers – Wickler (GER)	0
Bronze medal
10 August
Cherif – Ahmed (QAT)	0
Mol – Sørum (NOR)	2

=== Round of 16 ===
4 August 2024; 10:00	Ehlers – Wickler (Germany)	2–0	(Brazil) George – André	Eiffel Tower Stadium Champ de Mars, Paris; Attendance: 10,638; Referees: Brian Hiebert (CAN), Rui Carvalho (POR)
4 August 2024; 10:00	(21–16, 21–17); Report			Eiffel Tower Stadium Champ de Mars, Paris; Attendance: 10,638; Referees: Brian Hiebert (CAN), Rui Carvalho (POR)

4 August 2024; 13:00	Perušič – Schweiner (Czech Republic)	0–2	(Netherlands) Boermans – De Groot	Eiffel Tower Stadium Champ de Mars, Paris; Attendance: 10,434; Referees: Davide Crescentini (ITA), Sylvain Druart (FRA)
4 August 2024; 13:00	(18–21, 16–21); Report			Eiffel Tower Stadium Champ de Mars, Paris; Attendance: 10,434; Referees: Davide Crescentini (ITA), Sylvain Druart (FRA)

4 August 2024; 14:00	Åhman – Hellvig (Sweden)	2–1	(Cuba) Díaz – Alayo	Eiffel Tower Stadium Champ de Mars, Paris; Attendance: 10,767; Referees: Charalampos Papadogoulas (GRE), Brian Hiebert (CAN)
4 August 2024; 14:00	(21–11, 26–28, 15–11); Report			Eiffel Tower Stadium Champ de Mars, Paris; Attendance: 10,767; Referees: Charalampos Papadogoulas (GRE), Brian Hiebert (CAN)

4 August 2024; 21:00	Evandro – Arthur (Brazil)	2–0	(Netherlands) Van de Velde – Immers	Eiffel Tower Stadium Champ de Mars, Paris; Attendance: 10,559; Referees: Osvaldo Sumavil (ARG), José Padron (ESP)
4 August 2024; 21:00	(21–16, 21–16); Report			Eiffel Tower Stadium Champ de Mars, Paris; Attendance: 10,559; Referees: Osvaldo Sumavil (ARG), José Padron (ESP)

5 August 2024; 10:00	Bryl – Łosiak (Poland)	0–2	(Spain) Herrera – Gavira	Eiffel Tower Stadium Champ de Mars, Paris; Attendance: 10,705; Referees: Brian Hiebert (CAN), Robert Leko (SRB)
5 August 2024; 10:00	(21–23, 18–21); Report			Eiffel Tower Stadium Champ de Mars, Paris; Attendance: 10,705; Referees: Brian Hiebert (CAN), Robert Leko (SRB)

5 August 2024; 14:00	Evans – Budinger (United States)	0–2	(Norway) Mol – Sørum	Eiffel Tower Stadium Champ de Mars, Paris; Attendance: 10,799; Referees: Giovanni Bake (RSA), Davide Crescentini (ITA)
5 August 2024; 14:00	(16–21, 14–21); Report			Eiffel Tower Stadium Champ de Mars, Paris; Attendance: 10,799; Referees: Giovanni Bake (RSA), Davide Crescentini (ITA)

5 August 2024; 17:00	Partain – Benesh (United States)	2–0	(Italy) Cottafava – Nicolai	Eiffel Tower Stadium Champ de Mars, Paris; Attendance: 10,105; Referees: José Padron (ESP), Osvaldo Sumavil (ARG)
5 August 2024; 17:00	(21–17, 21–18); Report			Eiffel Tower Stadium Champ de Mars, Paris; Attendance: 10,105; Referees: José Padron (ESP), Osvaldo Sumavil (ARG)

5 August 2024; 22:00	Cherif – Ahmed (Qatar)	2–0	(Chile) M. Grimalt – E. Grimalt	Eiffel Tower Stadium Champ de Mars, Paris; Attendance: 10,713; Referees: Giseli Amantino (BRA), Brigham Beatie (USA)
5 August 2024; 22:00	(21–14, 21–13); Report			Eiffel Tower Stadium Champ de Mars, Paris; Attendance: 10,713; Referees: Giseli Amantino (BRA), Brigham Beatie (USA)

=== Quarterfinals ===
6 August 2024; 17:00	Ehlers – Wickler (Germany)	2–0	(Netherlands) Boermans – De Groot	Eiffel Tower Stadium Champ de Mars, Paris; Attendance: 10,269; Referees: Robert Leko (SRB), Rui Carvalho (POR)
6 August 2024; 17:00	(22–20, 21–15); Report			Eiffel Tower Stadium Champ de Mars, Paris; Attendance: 10,269; Referees: Robert Leko (SRB), Rui Carvalho (POR)

6 August 2024; 18:00	Evandro – Arthur (Brazil)	0–2	(Sweden) Åhman – Hellvig	Eiffel Tower Stadium Champ de Mars, Paris; Attendance: 10,629; Referees: Davide Crescentini (ITA), Brian Hiebert (CAN)
6 August 2024; 18:00	(17–21, 16–21); Report			Eiffel Tower Stadium Champ de Mars, Paris; Attendance: 10,629; Referees: Davide Crescentini (ITA), Brian Hiebert (CAN)

7 August 2024; 21:00	Herrera – Gavira (Spain)	0–2	(Norway) Mol – Sørum	Eiffel Tower Stadium Champ de Mars, Paris; Attendance: 10,425; Referees: Brian Hiebert (CAN), Giseli Amantino (BRA)
7 August 2024; 21:00	(16–21, 17–21); Report			Eiffel Tower Stadium Champ de Mars, Paris; Attendance: 10,425; Referees: Brian Hiebert (CAN), Giseli Amantino (BRA)

7 August 2024; 22:00	Cherif – Ahmed (Qatar)	2–0	(United States) Partain – Benesh	Eiffel Tower Stadium Champ de Mars, Paris; Attendance: 10,731; Referees: Charalampos Papadogoulas (GRE), Davide Crescentini (ITA)
7 August 2024; 22:00	(21–14, 21–16); Report			Eiffel Tower Stadium Champ de Mars, Paris; Attendance: 10,731; Referees: Charalampos Papadogoulas (GRE), Davide Crescentini (ITA)

=== Semifinals ===
8 August 2024; 18:00	Ehlers – Wickler (Germany)	2–1	(Norway) Mol – Sørum	Eiffel Tower Stadium Champ de Mars, Paris; Attendance: 10,591; Referees: Juan Saavedra (COL), Charalampos Papadogoulas (GRE)
8 August 2024; 18:00	(21–13, 17–21, 15–13); Report			Eiffel Tower Stadium Champ de Mars, Paris; Attendance: 10,591; Referees: Juan Saavedra (COL), Charalampos Papadogoulas (GRE)

8 August 2024; 22:00	Cherif – Ahmed (Qatar)	0–2	(Sweden) Åhman – Hellvig	Eiffel Tower Stadium Champ de Mars, Paris; Attendance: 10,660; Referees: Robert Leko (SRB), Osvaldo Sumavil (ARG)
8 August 2024; 22:00	(13–21, 17–21); Report			Eiffel Tower Stadium Champ de Mars, Paris; Attendance: 10,660; Referees: Robert Leko (SRB), Osvaldo Sumavil (ARG)

=== Bronze medal game ===
10 August 2024; 21:00	Cherif – Ahmed (Qatar)	0–2	(Norway) Mol – Sørum	Eiffel Tower Stadium Champ de Mars, Paris; Attendance: 8,904; Referees: Charalampos Papdogoulas (GRE), Brian Hiebert (CAN)
10 August 2024; 21:00	(13–21, 16–21); Report			Eiffel Tower Stadium Champ de Mars, Paris; Attendance: 8,904; Referees: Charalampos Papdogoulas (GRE), Brian Hiebert (CAN)

=== Gold medal game ===
10 August 2024; 22:30	Åhman – Hellvig (Sweden)	2–0	(Germany) Ehlers – Wickler	Eiffel Tower Stadium Champ de Mars, Paris; Attendance: 10,088; Referees: Brigham Beatie (USA), Davide Crescentini (ITA)
10 August 2024; 22:30	(21–10, 21–13); Report			Eiffel Tower Stadium Champ de Mars, Paris; Attendance: 10,088; Referees: Brigham Beatie (USA), Davide Crescentini (ITA)

== Final ranking ==
Rank	Team
Gold medal	Åhman – Hellvig (SWE)
Silver medal	Ehlers – Wickler (GER)
Bronze medal	Mol – Sørum (NOR)
4	Cherif – Ahmed (QAT)
5	Evandro – Arthur (BRA)
5	Boermans – De Groot (NED)
5	Herrera – Gavira (ESP)
5	Partain – Benesh (USA)
9	Díaz – Alayo (CUB)
9	George – André (BRA)
9	M. Grimalt – E. Grimalt (CHI)
9	Perušič – Schweiner (CZE)
9	Cottafava – Nicolai (ITA)
9	Van de Velde – Immers (NED)
9	Bryl – Łosiak (POL)
9	Evans – Budinger (USA)
17	Hodges – Schubert (AUS)
17	Schachter – Dearing (CAN)
19	Nicolaidis – Carracher (AUS)
19	Hörl – Horst (AUT)
19	Bassereau – Lyneel (FRA)
19	Krou – Gauthier-Rat (FRA)
19	Ranghieri – Carambula (ITA)
19	Abicha – El Graoui (MAR)

== See also ==
- Beach volleyball at the 2024 Summer Olympics
- Beach volleyball at the 2024 Summer Olympics – Women's tournament
- Volleyball at the 2024 Summer Olympics – Men's tournament
- Sitting volleyball at the 2024 Summer Paralympics – Men's tournament
