= Muslim women in sport =

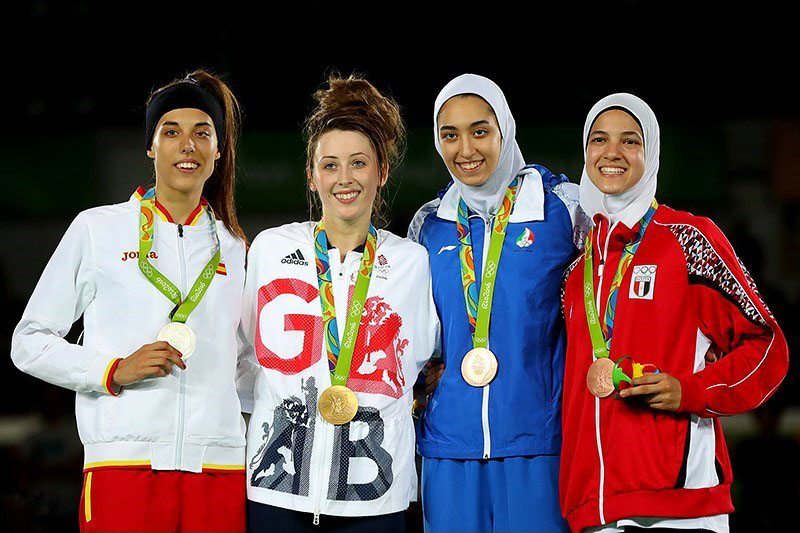
Taekwondo medalists from Spain, Britain, Iran and Egypt at Rio Olympics, 2016

Modern Muslim female athletes have achieved success in a variety of sports, including volleyball, tennis, association football, fencing, and basketball. In the 2016 Summer Olympics, fourteen women from Muslim-majority countries won medals, participating in a wide range of sports.

Still, Muslim women are underrepresented in athletic arenas, from school and amateur sports to international competitions. Causes may include cultural or familial pressures, the lack of suitable facilities and programs, and bans on the hijab, the Islamic headscarf. Muslim women have used sports as a means to empowerment, working towards health and wellbeing, women's rights, and education.

== Professional sports ==
=== Association football ===
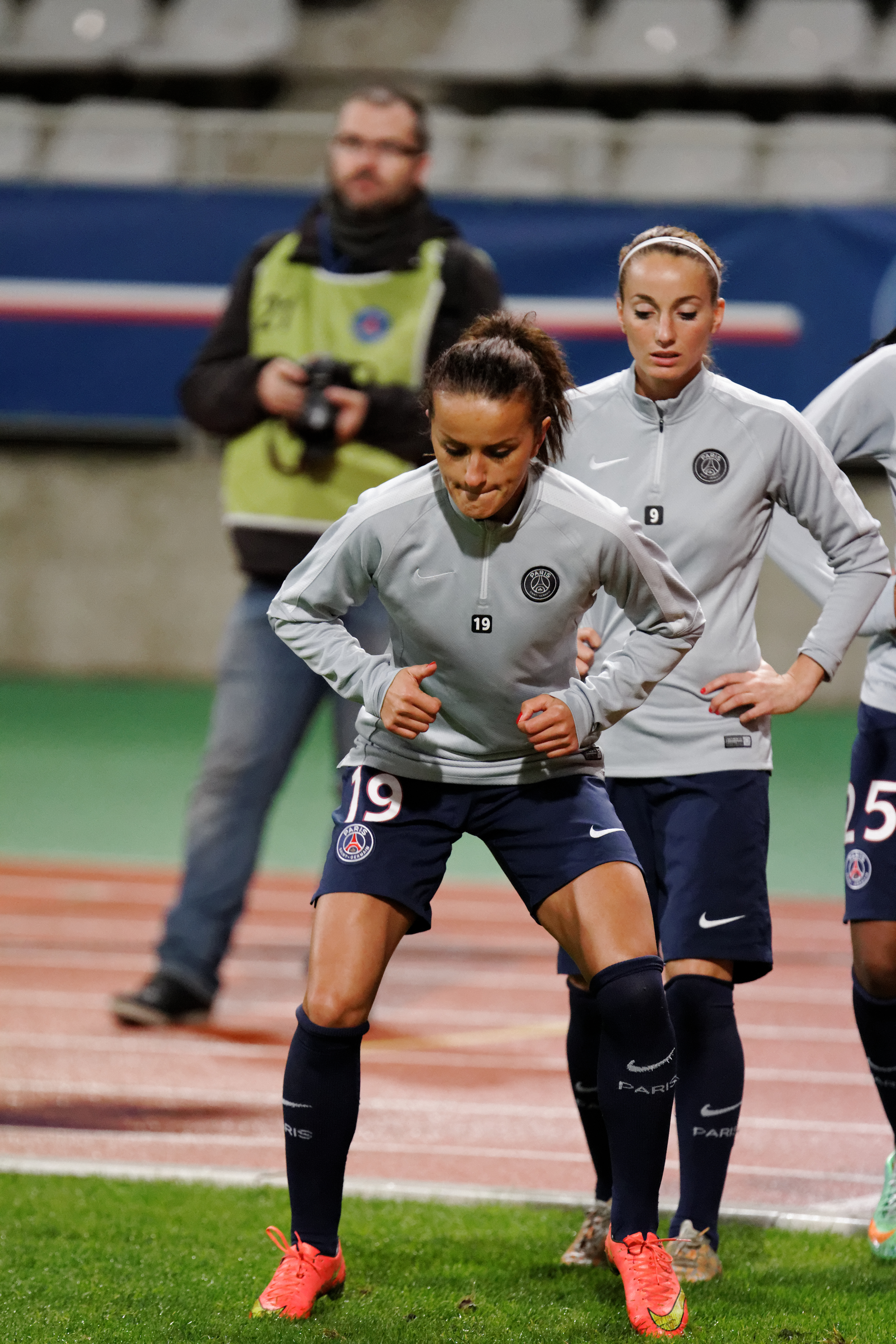
Paris Saint-Germain attacking midfielder Fatmire Alushi

Several nations that are members of the Organisation of Islamic Cooperation (OIC) have hosted major association football tournaments. UEFA's Azerbaijan hosted the 2012 FIFA U-17 Women's World Cup and set an average match attendance record for the tournament (since broken by Costa Rica in 2014); the official mascot for this world cup was the Top Top Girl (Top Top Qız), a young girl with the national flag of Azerbaijan painted on her cheeks. Jordan hosted the 2016 FIFA U-17 Women's World Cup, the first female soccer world cup to be held anywhere in the Middle East.

Additionally, three Asian regions containing significant numbers of OIC member states and/or large Muslim populations have inaugurated women's championships, including South Asia (SAFF Women's Championship, first edition held in 2010); ASEAN (AFF Women's Championship, 2006); and West Asia (West Asian Football Federation Championship, 2005).

A number of Muslim female footballers have been prominent players for various UEFA national teams in Western Europe. These include Fatmire Alushi (née Bajramaj), who was a world champion with Germany at the 2007 FIFA Women's World Cup in China and a two-time winner of the UEFA European Women's Championship (2009, 2013), and France national team player Jessica Houara-d'Hommeaux.

=== Basketball ===
Unlike many other sports associations, FIBA, basketball's international governing body, prohibited any headgear wider than five inches, effectively prohibiting players from wearing hijabs; the policy was rescinded in 2017. From 2016, the policy received scrutiny from hundreds of thousands of individuals on social media, a movement that was headed by NCAA players Indira Kaljo and Bilqis Abdul-Qaadir. Fellow players Ezdihar Abdulmula, Asma Elbadawi, Ki-Ke Rafiu, Raisa Aribatul, Raabya Pasha, Merve Sapci, and Noha Berhan also created petitions asking FIBA to repeal the ban.

Both Kaljo and Abdul-Qaadir achieved considerable success in high school and college basketball. Abdul-Qaadir was the 2009 Massachusetts Gatorade Player of the Year, scored over 3,000 points during high school (a state record for both boys and girls), and was named to the C-USA All-Academic team during her career at the University of Memphis. Kaljo was a JUCO All-American player who only began wearing the hijab in her late 20s. Both women chose not to pursue a professional basketball career as a result of their religious convictions.

=== Cricket ===
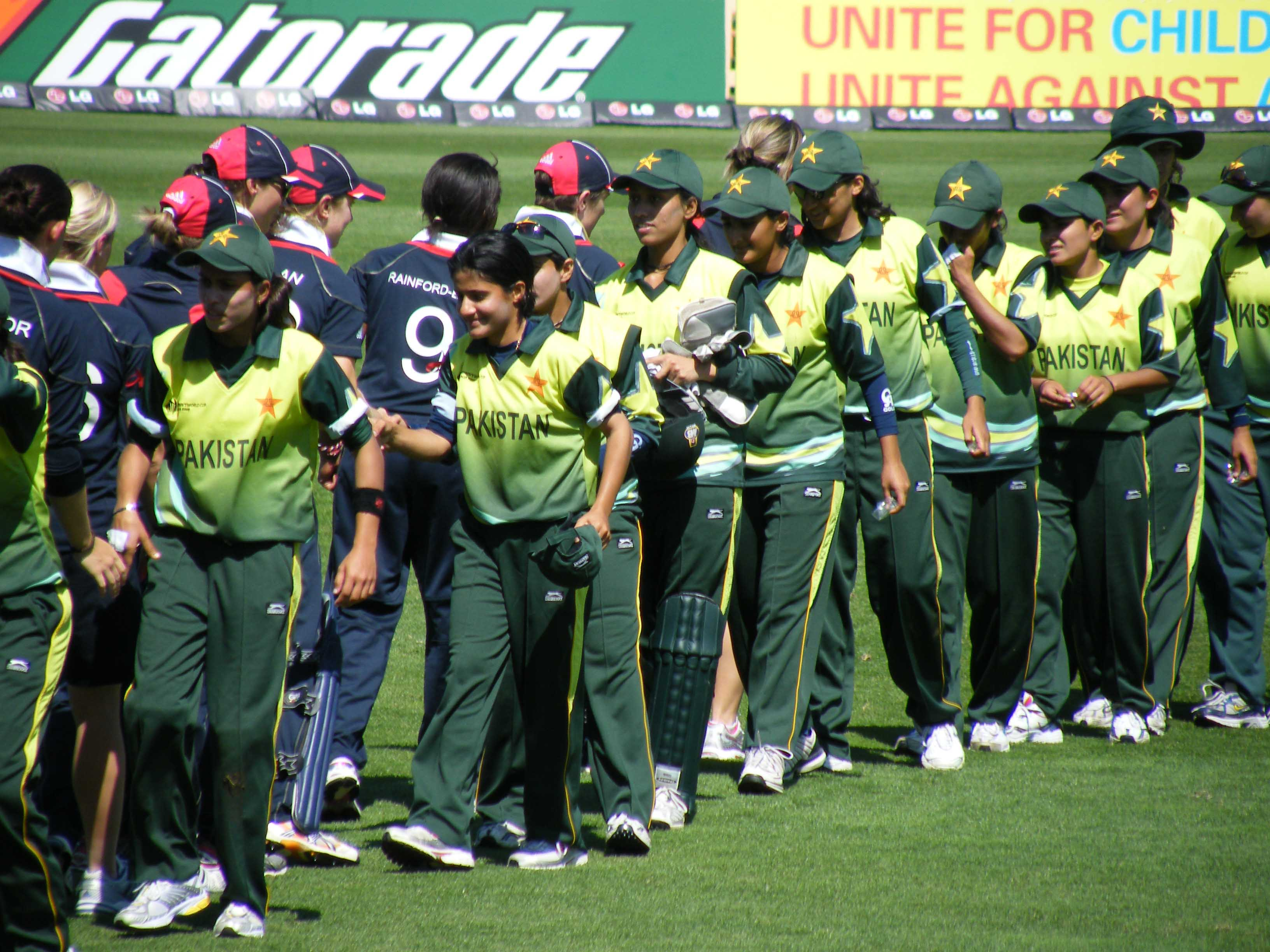
Members of the Pakistan women's cricket team (in green) after a match against England at the 2009 World Cup

In the ICC Women's Rankings, two of the top ten teams (Pakistan and Bangladesh) are from Muslim-majority countries, and Bangladesh hosted the 2014 Women's World Twenty20 (one of cricket's two world championships). Muslim women have also represented India (Fowzieh Khalili, Nuzhat Parween, Gouher Sultana, Nooshin Al Khadeer, and Rasanara Parwin) and South Africa (Shabnim Ismail). In England, Muslim women have not penetrated cricket to the same degree as Muslim men (several of whom have represented England internationally). The Women's County Championship only got its first Muslim player in 2012, when Salma Bi debuted for Northamptonshire.

In conservative Muslim societies, cricket may be viewed as more suitable for women than other sports due to its modest clothing (long trousers and long sleeves) and lack of physical contact. An Iranian women's team was formed in 2009, and in 2010, cricketer Narges Lafooti became the first Iranian woman to travel alone to an overseas sporting event, travelling to Singapore to umpire an under-19 tournament. In Afghanistan, women's cricket faces ongoing difficulties due to cultural attitudes against women in sport, including specific threats against female players. A national team was formed in 2010, but by 2014 it was effectively dormant.

=== Fencing ===
In 2016, fencer Ibtihaj Muhammad became the first American to compete in the Olympics while wearing a hijab. She chose the sport because it was one of the few that she could compete in without altering the uniform. In an interview with Tamerra Griffin, she said that she hoped to be an impetus for diversity in a sphere that has "always been a white sport reserved for people with money". Ibtihaj was ranked eighth in the world entering the 2016 Summer Olympics, but lost in the round of 16 to France's Cécelia Berder.

Tunisian foil fencer Inés Boubakri won the bronze medal at the 2016 Summer Olympics, defeating Russian Aida Shanayeva in the medal round. She dedicated her medal to all Arab women, saying that she wished her victory to be a message that "women exist and they have their place in society".

=== Figure skating ===
Russian figure skater Alina Zagitova is the 2018 Olympic champion, 2018 European champion, 2017–18 Grand Prix Final champion, and the holder of the world record scores in both senior and junior ladies' figure skating.

Elizabet Tursynbayeva is the 2019 World silver medalist, the 2019 Four Continents silver medalist, the 2017 CS Ice Star champion, the 2018 CS Finlandia Trophy silver medalist, the 2015 CS Golden Spin of Zagreb silver medalist, the 2019 Winter Universiade silver medalist, and a three-time Kazakhstani national champion (2015–2017).

Kamila Valieva is the 2020 World Junior champion, the 2019 Junior Grand Prix Final champion, and the 2021 Russian senior national silver medalist.

In 2012, Zahra Lari became the first figure skater to represent the United Arab Emirates in international competitions; she is also the first figure skater to compete internationally while wearing a hijab and full-body covering.

=== Ice hockey ===
Abu Dhabi native Fatima Al Ali plays for the United Arab Emirates women's national ice hockey team. As part of the "Hockey is for Everyone" campaign in February 2017, she practiced with the Washington Capitals of the National Hockey League and with the Washington Pride of the Junior Women's Hockey League. She hopes to inspire other Muslim women in the United Arab Emirates to play hockey. She also participated in a ceremonial puck drop during a game between the Washington Capitals and the Detroit Red Wings on February 9, 2017.

=== Martial arts ===
In the 2016 Summer Olympics, more Muslim women won medals in martial arts events than in any other sport. Majlinda Kelmendi won gold in judo in the 52-kg weight class, the first ever medal for her native Kosovo. Mariya Stadnik (48-kg wrestling) won silver for Azerbaijan, and Iranian Kimia Alizadeh Zenoorin and Egyptian Hedaya Malak tied for bronze in the 57-kg taekwondo event. Other bronze medalists include Azerbaijani Patimat Abakarova (49-kg taekwondo), Tunisian Marwa Amri (58-kg wrestling), and Turkish Nur Tatar (67-kg taekwondo). Distria Krasniqi won gold in judo in the 48-kg weight at the 2020 Summer Olympics.

In the 2020 Summer Olympics, Egyptian Feryal Abdelaziz won gold against Irina Zaretska of Azerbaijan 2–0 in the final for the 61-kg karate kumite, becoming the first Egyptian woman to win the title. Fellow Egyptian Giana Farouk won the bronze the 61-kg karate kumite. Egyptian Hedaya Malak won bronze in the 67-kg taekwondo event.

=== Mountaineering ===
In 2005, Iranians Farkhondeh Sadegh and Leila Bahrami became the first Muslim women to successfully climb Mount Everest. They dedicated their accomplishment to all Muslim women, saying, "People often seem to think Muslim women are limited. It would be a good chance to show the world that something like this is possible for us." Raha Moharrak became the youngest Arab and first Saudi woman to peak Everest in 2013.

=== Tennis ===
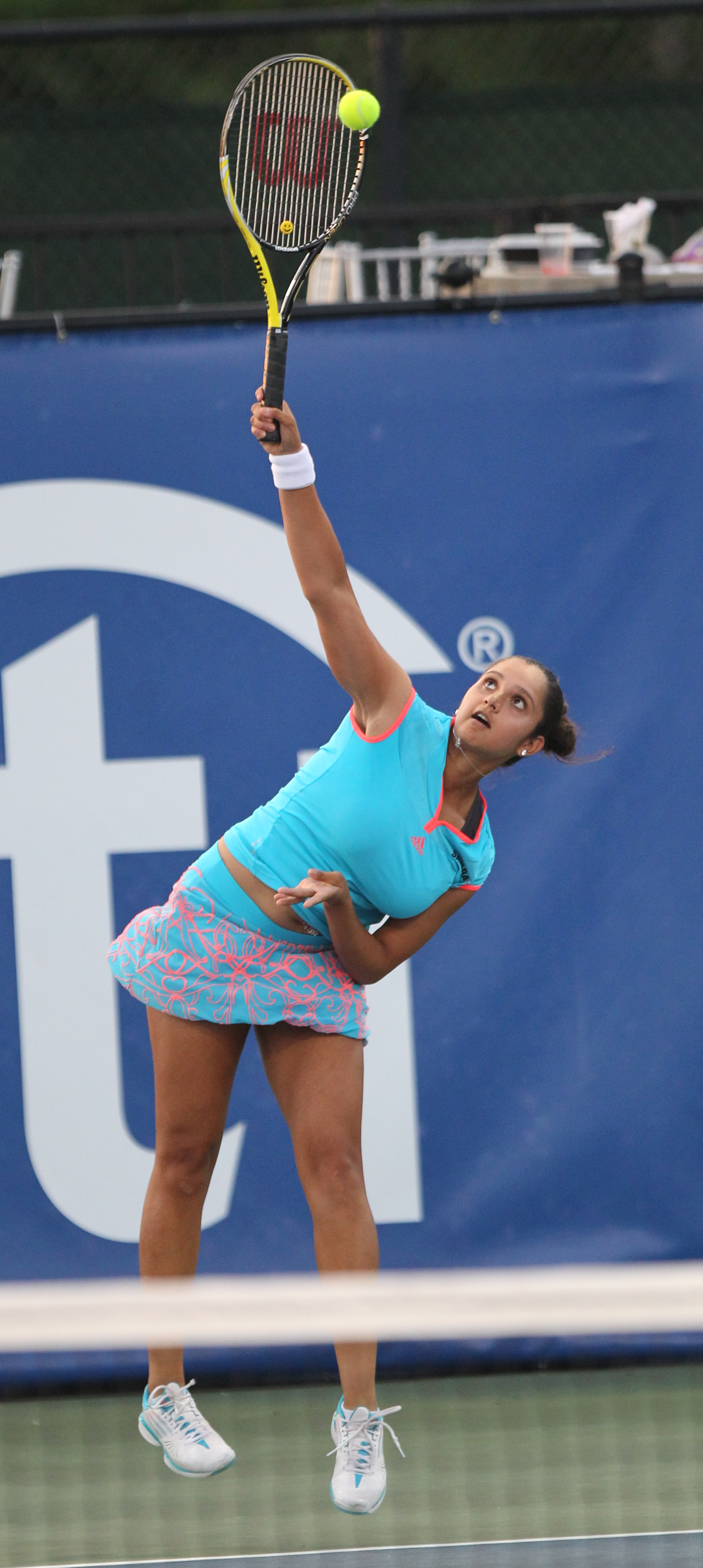
Sania Mirza, a former world No. 1 in women's tennis doubles, is an Indian Muslim.

Several OIC member states host professional-level tennis tournaments. As of 2016, there are Women's Tennis Association (WTA) Tour events in Malaysia (Malaysian Open, Kuala Lumpur; inaugurated 2010), Morocco (Grand Prix SAR La Princesse Lalla Meryem, Rabat; 2001), Qatar (Qatar Open, Doha; 2001), Turkey (Istanbul Cup; 2005), the United Arab Emirates (Dubai Tennis Championships; 1993), and Uzbekistan (Tashkent Open; 1999). A number of OIC member states are also experiencing rapid economic development and constructing tennis facilities on a previously unprecedented scale.

Notable Muslim female tennis players include Zarina Diyas, Selima Sfar, Aravane Rezaï, Dinara Safina, Sania Mirza, Ons Jabeur, Mayar Sherif and Fatma Al-Nabhani. Rezaï, an Iranian-French player, has won four WTA titles and achieved a career-high singles ranking of 15. Jabeur, a Tunisian player became the first North African/Arab woman to win a WTA singles title at Birmingham in June 2021 and also the first ever to break into the top 10 in singles. Primarily a doubles player, Mirza reached a #1 doubles ranking in 2015, winning 40 career titles. She has faced severe criticism from Muslim clerics in her native India, who condemn her decision to wear conventional tennis outfits as "indecent".

=== Track and field ===
At the 2016 Summer Olympics, Dalilah Muhammad became the first American woman to win a gold medal in the 400 metre hurdles, and is the world record holder in the event. Muhammad's parents attribute her success to her "Muslim faith, discipline, and talent". Other notable Muslim track and field athletes include Sarah Attar, Sifan Hassan, who holds the world record in the Mile, Salwa Eid Naser, Enas Mansour, Dina el-Tabaa, Shinoona Salah Al-Habsi, Kariman Abulijadayel, Kamiya Yousufi, and Sulaiman Fatima Dahman.

=== Volleyball ===
Between 2010 and 2016, teams from Turkey and Azerbaijan won five out of seven titles at the FIVB Volleyball Women's Club World Championship. Both nations are part of the OIC. During the same period, in the CEV Women's Champions League, Turkish clubs won five out of six editions from 2010 to 2015.

The Turkish women's national volleyball team has enjoyed significant success in the twenty-first century. They won gold at the Mediterranean Games in 2005, finished first in the 2014 European League, and beat Poland 3–0 in the final of the inaugural European games in 2015. Other notable women's national volleyball teams from the OIC include Azerbaijan, Algeria (who were African champions in 2009 and gold medallists at the 2011 All-Africa Games), and three-times African champions Tunisia.

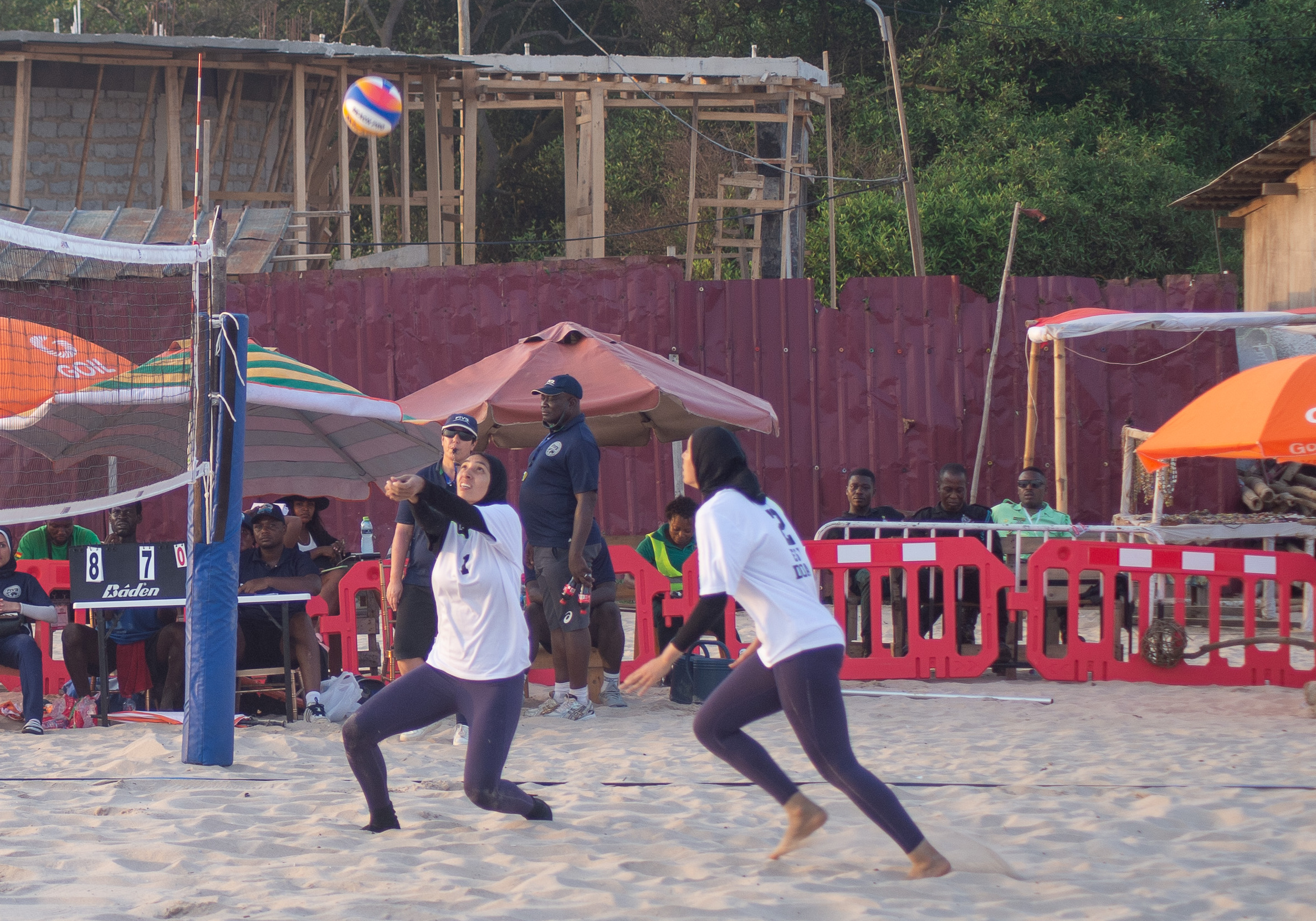
Marwa Abdelhady (L) and Doaa Elghobashy for 2023 African Games

At the 2016 Summer Olympics, Egyptian beach volleyball player Doaa Elghobashy made international headlines for competing in pants, a long-sleeved shirt, and a hijab. While she and her partner Nada Meawad did not advance to the knockout stage of the tournament, she saw the event as a chance to increase the visibility and participation of minorities in sports.

=== Weightlifting ===
Until 2011, regulations requiring weightlifters' knees and elbows to be visible prevented conservative Muslim athletes from participating in elite competitions. American weightlifter Kulsoom Abdullah compiled an extensive report to the International Weightlifting Federation arguing that she should be allowed to compete while covering her head, arms, and legs. With the help of Muslim activists, the US Olympic committee, and a lawyer, she was successful in overturning the regulation, and competed in a national championship later that year. Several Muslim women won medals in weightlifting during the 2012 & 2016 Summer Olympics, including Kazakh Zhazira Zhapparkul, Anna Nurmukhambetova, Indonesian Sri Wahyuni Agustiani, and Egyptian Sara Ahmed.

== Amateur sports ==
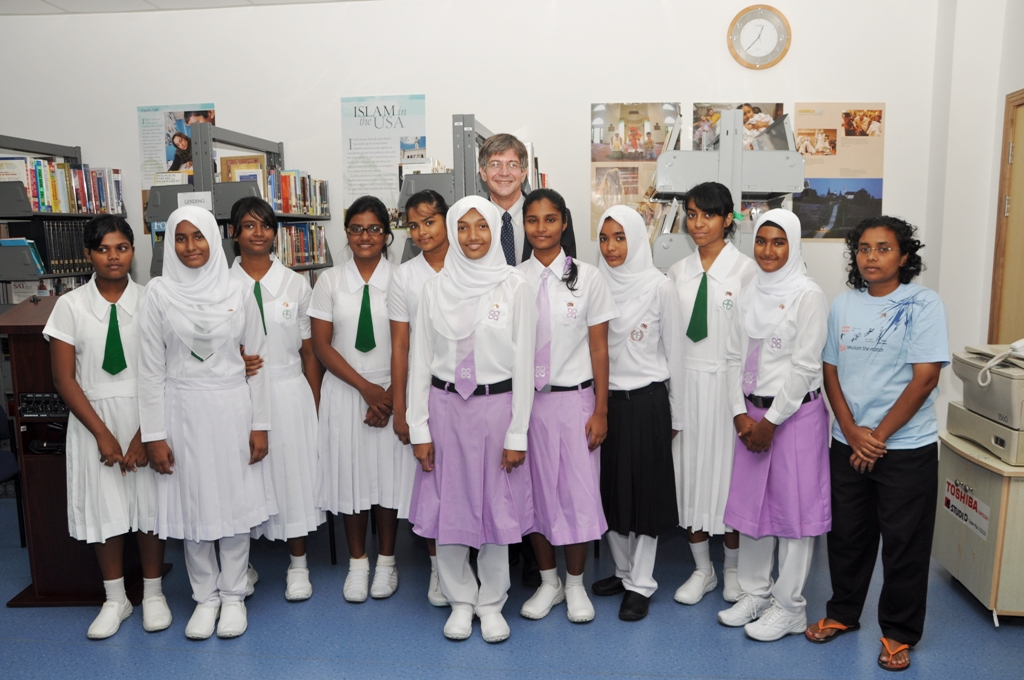
Maldivian girls' soccer team

Researchers have found low participation rates in physical education and school sports among Muslim schoolgirls in both predominantly Muslim and predominantly non-Muslim nations. In a study of Turkish middle schools, Hümeriç and colleagues found that girls were less likely to attend physical education classes, and were less active on average when they did participate. This discrepancy is often even more pronounced in Western countries, where school policies on dress code and opposite-sex interaction often conflict with conservative Muslim students' values. Muslim girls, for example, may be forced or pressured to remove their head coverings in order to participate in sports. Physical education may also pose problems for Muslim students whose beliefs require them to avoid physical contact with the opposite sex.

Sports participation is likely to increase in predominantly Muslim countries, especially Arab states of the Persian Gulf, in the future. Many OIC states have rapidly growing economies and increasingly youthful populations, which may increase market potential for professional sports, athletic products, and community sports organization.

== Factors affecting sports participation ==
=== Religious ===
In the Islamic conception, every human being has a responsibility towards oneself. Since human life is sacred and initially created by divine rather than human agency, people are responsible for trying to keep their bodies and souls healthy, and not causing themselves spiritual or physical harm. Traditions record that Muhammad encouraged parents to teach their children swimming, riding and archery. There is a commonly shared hadith that recounts a race between Muhammad and his wife, Aisha. Persian miniatures show Muslim women jointly playing polo with men in the same field. In the twenty-first century, some Muslim sociologists even argue that it should be obligatory for Muslim females to participate in sport of some kind.

Many conservative Muslims are concerned with fitna and Muslim women will choose to not participate in physical activities that may be observed by men. Female-only gyms and competitions have emerged as a way to increase Muslim women's participation in sports. In 2014, several members of Sport Against Racism Ireland created Diverse City FC, a football team for Muslim women that competed in the Fair Play Cup. Similarly, in 1993 Faezeh Hashemi founded the Women's Islamic Games, an international event where all athletes, coaches, officials, and spectators were female. Since the hijab is generally worn only in the presence of males outside of the immediate family, this format allows women to compete without facing scrutiny for the way they dress. Some communities have also created female-only gyms targeted specifically at Muslim women. The Islamic Solidarity Games also seek to be compatible with the unique needs of Muslim female athletes, using sport to "protect the interests of the Muslim world" and "promoting international peace and harmony".

=== Family ===
In a study of young Muslim women living in the United Kingdom, Kay Tess found that family influences heavily impacted their ability to participate in sports. The women spent much of their time within the home, and their outside activities were frequently monitored by their parents. Since there were very few culturally appropriate sports programs within their community, their participation was limited. Managers of sports teams in predominantly Muslim countries also report difficulty in convincing parents to allow their daughters to participate in sports.

=== Structural ===
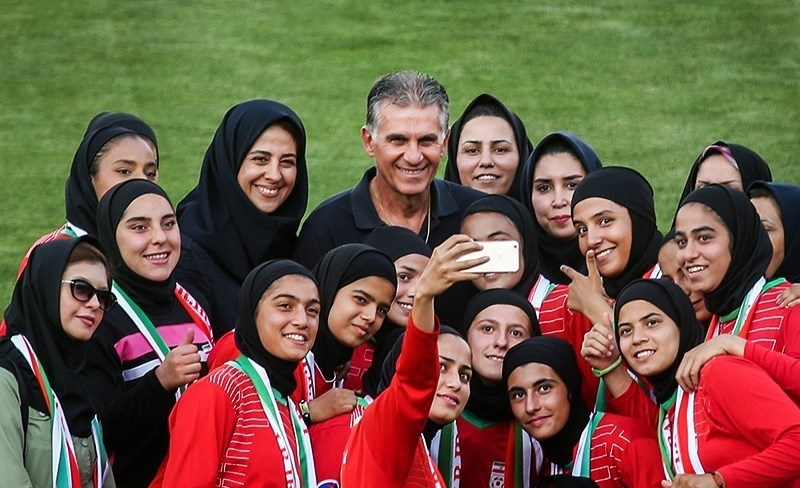
The Iranian women's national football team training in Azadi Stadium

Many sports organizations and competitions do not provide the support and resources needed by Muslim female athletes. For example, until 2012, athletes were not allowed to wear the Islamic headscarf, commonly known as the hijab, while competing in the majority of Olympic events. The same year marked the first time that the Olympic Committee took Ramadan into account, scheduling events with fasting athletes early in the morning so that they would be maximally fed and hydrated. Although sensitivity to the needs of Muslim athletes has increased at the elite level, many competitions still include significant structural barriers. The International Basketball Federation, for example, prohibited hijabi athletes from competing in any of its matches or tournaments. The Qatar national team withdrew from the 2014 Asian Games as a result of the ban, as many of their players wore the hijab. This ban was overturned in May 2017. FIFA also instituted a hijab ban in 2011, forcing the Iranian women's team to forfeit an Olympic qualifying match. Such regulations are usually justified based on claims that hijabs are safety threats, increasing athletes' risk of suffocation and heatstroke. To combat this issue, several companies have developed sports hijabs that are no more dangerous than commonplace sports equipment like jerseys and cleats. In response, FIFA has since rescinded its hijab ban and now allows athletes to compete in approved sports hijabs.

=== Cultural ===
As is the case in many societies, gender roles prevalent in Muslim communities can limit women's participation in sports. Traditional expectations focus on women's roles as wives and mothers, and often see sport as a primarily male domain. Risa Isard found that female footballers and spectators in Iran, Palestine, and Turkey struggle with the popular view of football as a "man's game" that is unsuitable for women's participation. Turkish national team player Esra Erol also reports that she was allowed to play football as a child, but that she faced greater scrutiny for her athletic pursuits as she reached adolescence and adulthood. At the same time, sociologist Kay Tess observed that some Muslim families view sports as an unnecessary distraction from education, which they see as highly important.

Cultural barriers to sports participation are by no means unique to Muslim societies. In a wide variety of contexts, researchers have found gender differences in people's belief in their own athletic abilities. On average, men and boys perceive themselves as more athletically competent than women and girls, which may increase their propensity to participate in sports. In adolescence, girls tend to have lower sports participation rates, and this discrepancy increases with age. Additionally, women who participate in competitive sports are often negatively stigmatized as being lesbians, regardless of their actual sexuality. Muslim women sometimes face cultural barriers to sports participation that are common across societies in addition to those specific to their communities.

== Media portrayal ==
Muslim women's participation in sports is often seen as an indication that they are becoming more liberated and Western. For example, when Afghan sprinter Robina Muqimyar competed in the 2004 Summer Olympics, Western media sources praised her for exchanging the burqa, which they saw as inherently oppressive, for sports attire. Mahfoud Amara labels this type of coverage as "orientalist" and "culturally imperialistic", as it measures Muslim women's freedom and wellbeing by whether or not they conform to Western athletic norms and expectations. On the other hand, Muslim female athletes often face criticism and scrutiny when they do not conform to Western athletic ideals. Hijabi athletes were excluded from the Olympic Games until 1996, and debate continues about whether or not head covering is a religious symbol that is out of place in secular athletic spheres. Samie and Sehlikoglu report that media coverage of hijabi athletes at the 2012 Summer Olympics portrayed them as "strange, incompetent, and out-of-place". Disproportionate attention was given to Muslim nations with a low female-to-male athlete ratio, as well as veiling and Ramadan fasting. Reporters also frequently alluded to exotic sexuality of Muslim female athletes, fetishizing both their covering and their bodies.

Some Muslim female athletes have expressed concern that media sources focus on their clothing choices to the exclusion of their athletic achievements. For example, Turkish taekwondo athlete Kübra Dağlı wrote on social media, "They don't speak of my success, but of my headscarf. I don’t want this. Our success should be discussed." Milliyet newspaper columnist Asu Maro documented two distinct sources of criticism she faced – Muslims who saw taekwondo itself as improper for women, and secular organizations that wanted her to remove her hijab during competitions. He condemned both groups as holding "sexist ideologies" that are harmful to Kübra Dağlı and other Muslim female athletes.

In 2017, Nike unveiled its "Pro Hijab", a hijab designed for safety and comfort during strenuous exercise. The garment was tested by elite athletes like figure skater Zahra Lari, and is set to be sold starting in early 2018.

== Empowerment through sports ==
Researchers have consistently found significant positive effects of sports participation, both within Muslim communities and in the general population. Specifically, organized physical activity promotes physical, psychological, and social wellbeing, leadership skills, and community involvement. Many women also use sport as a way to challenge traditional gender norms and obtain an education.

=== Women's rights ===
Muslim women have used sports as a way to challenge patriarchal norms. In a case study of the Palestinian women's national football team, Gieβ-Stüber and colleagues found that sport had become a "social movement for self-determination, agency, peace and friendship" in the players' lives. Several of the players also saw their athletics as opportunities to challenge assumptions about the roles and capabilities of women. Specifically, player Jackline Jazrawl wanted to use football to prove that "women are free and can do whatever men do". Local Palestinian leaders supported this movement by providing free tickets to home matches, and thousands of men and women attended.

Some Muslim female athletes also see their athletic success as an opportunity to challenge the way non-Muslim communities view Muslim women. For example, mountain climber Leila Bahrami called her successful ascent of Mount Everest a way to "show the world" that Muslim women are capable rather than "limited".

=== Education ===
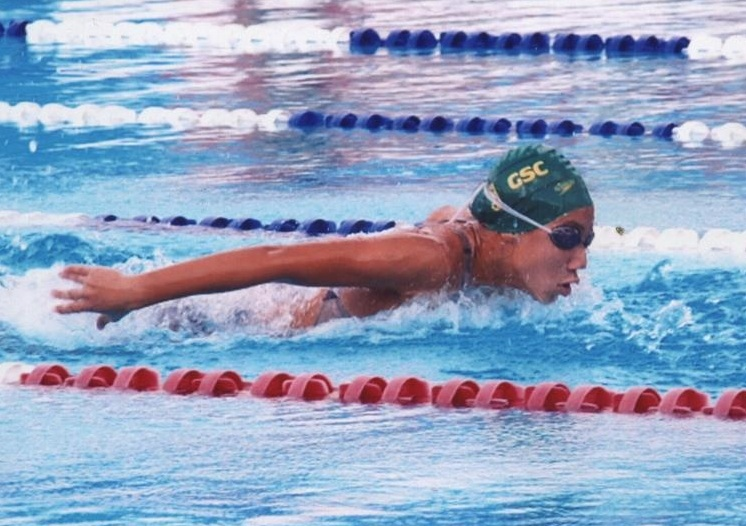
Swimmer Farida Osman cited education as an important factor behind her dedication to sports.

Some professional and semiprofessional sports leagues are specifically focused on giving women and girls the chance to receive an education. For example, Sakarya, a women's football club in Turkey, encourages its players to use their stipends to pursue a university education. This opportunity is even influential in convincing families to let their daughters play football, which is traditionally considered to be a man's game. Athletic scholarships can also be influential in Muslim girls' decisions to continue pursuing sports during and after secondary school. Several professional Muslim female athletes, including tennis player Fatma Al Nabhani and swimmer Farida Osman, cited education as important to their athletic careers. Their athletic scholarships allowed them to continue competing while also earning a university degree.

== See also ==
- Women and bicycling in Islam
- Women's sport in Saudi Arabia
- Islamic Solidarity Games
- Turkish women in sports
- Women's Islamic Games
- Women's sports

== Bibliography ==
- Amara, Mahfoud (2011). The Arab world in Global sporting Arena: An Islamic perspective (Chapter 6). UK: Palgrave Macmillan. ISBN 9780230359505.
