= Women's sport in Saudi Arabia =

Women's sport in Saudi Arabia has been a controversial topic for many years due to the suppression of female participation in sport by conservative Islamic religious authorities.

In 2013 Saudi Arabia’s first dedicated sports centre for girls was opened in Jeddah, offering training programs that include physical fitness, karate, yoga and weight loss as well as special activities for children. That year it was also announced that Saudi Arabian girls are officially allowed to take part in sports in private schools, which they had not officially been allowed to do previously, though they had done so unofficially. Sports activities are prohibited in public schools for girls. In 2017, Saudi Arabia’s Ministry of Education (MoE) allowed physical education in public schools. This step was taken in line with Saudi Vision 2030 to boost healthy practices among different spectrums in Saudi Arabia.

Until 2018 women were not permitted in sport stadiums, even as spectators. Segregated seating, allowing women to enter, has been developed in King Fahd Stadium, King Abdullah Sports City and Prince Mohamed bin Fahd Stadium.

In the framework of Saudi Arabia's endeavour to promote women's sport, Princess Reema bint Bandar was appointed as the head of the Saudi Federation for Community Sports (SFCS) which made her the first Saudi woman to occupy such a position.

In 2019, the first female Saudi sport commentator, Hailah Al-Farraj, was hired. Farraj was selected to report on the GCC women's soccer competition.

In 2019 Saudi Arabia hosted the first open format curling tournament ever held in Africa or the Middle East. The event took place at the Funland Bowling & Ice Skating Centre in Manama, Bahrain, on October 11–12, 2019. Hosted by the Kingdom Curling Association, the tournament was open to 12 teams of four or more players. Each team required a mixture of male and female athletes.

== Olympic and Paralympic games ==
The Saudi 2012 Summer Olympics team included female athletes for the first time ever, and they sent female athletes again in 2016. The Saudi Paralympic team has not yet included any women.

=== 2012 Summer Olympics in London ===
Saudi Arabia sending women to compete in the Olympics in 2012 was listed at number two in Cambridge News' top nine milestones for women in sports. Sarah Attar, an American born dual US-Saudi citizen, participated in women's track finishing last in the competition, while Wojdan Shaherkani was defeated in her Judo competition in under two minutes. Despite the losses, being the first women to represent their country in the Olympics is considered an overall success for the participants, and Attar received a standing ovation as she pursued the finish line from the audience in London. She reports seeing positive changes during her visits to Saudi Arabia as a result of her participation, with female students becoming more interested in sport. Saudi scholar Ali al-Ahmed said that "their presence has allowed Saudi Arabia to escape criticism".

=== 2016 Summer Olympics in Rio ===
Saudi Arabia sent four athletes to the Rio Olympics, with Attar competing in the marathon, Kariman Abuljadayel, a student at Northeastern University, in the 100m, Joud Fahmy in judo, and Lubna Al-Omair in fencing. All were selected through wild cards.

Attar finished second from last out of finishers in the marathon, Abuljadayel came seventh in her heat with a time of 14.02s and al-Omair lost in the first round. Fahmy pulled out of the judo before competing, in an apparent effort to avoid fighting Israeli competitor Gili Cohen, although this was denied by the Saudi delegation.

The Saudi Arabian Olympic Committee website did not name any of the women representing the Kingdom.

== Basketball ==
In Jeddah in 2003 the first women’s basketball team in Saudi Arabia was formed by Lina Al-Maeena, co-founder of the Jeddah United Sporting Company, the first sports organization that sought to include the development of female athletes in 2006. Jeddah United provides an environment where males, females, children, and adults can all participate in sporting activities. Their goal is to embrace all Saudis to partake in physical activity through sports all around the country. As of December 2013 the number of members enrolled was above 500. Jeddah United has also played a role in establishing similar organizations in Khobar (Khobar United) and in the capital city Riyadh (Riyadh United). Their long term goal is to produce top class athletes that can compete on a professional level throughout the country, and on the world stage.

== Cricket ==
Informal cricket has been played by girls in international schools for a number of years, but the first official women's cricket match in Saudi Arabia was played in Jeddah in March 2020, with a mixture of Saudi nationals and expatriates from cricket-playing countries.

Following the further liberalisation of women's sport, the Saudi Arabia women's national cricket team made its international debut at the 2022 GCC Women's Gulf Cup in Oman in March 2022. The squad reportedly had an average age of 15-16, with most players having only played the sport for a few months. The team suffered heavy defeats.

== Football ==
The nonexistence of a women's national football team was a perennial issue between FIFA and the Saudi Arabia Football Federation. FIFA changed their rules in 2012 to allow players to wear a hijab during FIFA-sanctioned matches, but Saudi authorities declined to comment. In 2018 the Saudi Arabia's Football Federation (SAFF) hired two women as members of its board.

In 2022, the Saudi Arabia women's national football team made their international debut, defeating Seychelles by a score of 2–0 in a friendly match located in Malé, Maldives.

== Running ==
In 2013, a running community was born in the City of Jeddah, Saudi Arabia. Jeddah Running Community (JRC) is the first mixed-gender running group in the kingdom. Initiated by a group of expats and locals, the group regularly runs in the streets of Jeddah. The movement also expanded to three other cities; Riyadh (Riyadh Urban Runners), Khobar (Khobar Running Krew), and Madina (Madina Runners).

All four groups are combined under the YALLARUN organization. With the support of the organization, they were able to have several races and competitions locally. A branch from JRC became the Jeddah Running Community Women (JRCW) which is a group exclusively for women; the aim of the group is to start training beginners to be able to compete in 5 km races. The group was created to give a chance for women who want to participate but not in a mixed gender group.

Since then more groups have formed, including Bliss Runners in Jeddah.

Due to Islamic and Saudi law that women must wear a long black dress called an Abaya while in public, all women of the running community run the streets with sports outfits covered by a black dress. However, some women have begun wearing sports-friendly abayas which are gaining traction.

In March 2018, the first female road race was held in Saudi Arabia with 1500 women taking part.

== Motorsport ==
The first Saudi female race driver is Reema Juffali. In 2019, Juffali represented Saudi Arabia in the F4 British Championship at Brands Hatch.

== See also ==
- Muslim women in sport
  - Women and bicycling in Islam
