= Beach volleyball at the 2011 All-Africa Games =

- Location: Maputo

Beach volleyball at the 2011 All-Africa Games in Maputo, Mozambique was held between September 11–14, 2011.

== Medal summary ==
Event	Gold	Silver	Bronze
Men	South Africa; Freedom Chiya; Grant Goldschmidt	Angola; Márcio Sequeira; Eden Sequeira	Ghana; Ajamako Seidu; Evans Tagoe
Women	Mauritius; Elodie Li Yuk Lo; Natacha Rigobert	South Africa; Palesa Sekhenyana; Randy Williams	Kenya; Margaret Indilara; Dorcas Ndasaba

=== Medal table ===
Rank	Nation	Gold	Silver	Bronze	Total
1	South Africa	1	1	0	2
2	Mauritius	1	0	0	1
3	Angola	0	1	0	1
4	Ghana	0	0	1	1
4	Kenya	0	0	1	1
Totals (5 entries)		2	2	2	6

== Results ==
=== Men ===
Semifinals
M. Sequeira - E. Sequeira (ANG)	21	21
Ajilore - Anyasodnke (NGA)	15	19
Chiya - Goldschmidt (RSA)	21	21
Seidu - Tagoe (GHA)	19	17

Gold medal match
M. Sequeira - E. Sequeira (ANG)	9	17
Chiya - Goldschmidt (RSA)	21	21
Bronze medal match
Ajilore - Anyasodnke (NGA)	17	25
Seidu - Tagoe (GHA)	21	27

=== Women ===
Semifinals
Lo - Rigobert (MRI)	21	13	15
Preiolla - Mariam (NGA)	16	21	12
Sekhenyana - Williams (RSA)	23	21
Indilara - Ndasaba (KEN)	21	19

Gold medal match
Lo - Rigobert (MRI)	21	21
Sekhenyana - Williams (RSA)	13	12
Bronze medal match
Preiolla - Mariam (NGA)	16	12
Indilara - Ndasaba (KEN)	21	21
