= Grant Goldschmidt =

South African beach volleyball player (born 1983)

Personal information
- Nationality: South Africa
- Born: 16 April 1983 (age 43); Cape Town, South Africa
- Height: 194 cm (76 in)
- Weight: 92 kg (203 lb)
Honours
Men's beach volleyball
Representing South Africa
All-Africa Games
Gold medal – first place	2011 Maputo	Doubles

Grant Goldschmidt (born 16 April 1983) is a South African male beach volleyball player. He competed for South Africa at the 2012 Summer Olympics with teammate Freedom Chiya. They did not progress beyond the group stages.

He was born in Cape Town, South Africa.
