= Women and bicycling in Islam =

Women biking or bicycling in Muslim world

Bicycling in Islam is a topic of discussion in Islam, primarily in regard to its use by Muslim women. Religious scholars are worried in particular about the effects of cycling on women's modesty (not revealing the body) and mobility (social control).

In some parts of the Ottoman Empire, bicycling was taken up by women in the early 1900s. Women have fought against opposition from orthodox religious scholars and conservatives, while moderates maintain that there is textual evidence that Muslim women should be allowed, and even encouraged, to cycle. Regardless, increasing numbers of Muslim women have participated in cycle rallies and international competitions in recent years.

== History ==
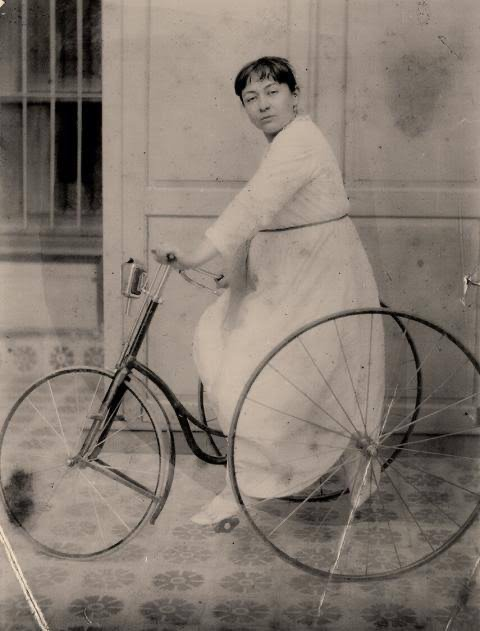
Turkish novelist Fatma Aliye Topuz riding a tricycle

The first Western travelers with bicycles were documented in the Ottoman Empire starting in 1885, including an American woman, Annie Londonderry, who made a bike trip around the world from 1894 to 1895. Most early Ottoman cyclists were likely members of the middle and upper classes, as bicycles imported from Europe were expensive.

Referred to in the press as velospid or bisiklet, in rural areas the bicycle was often called şeytan arabası, meaning "devil's cart" or "devil's chariot"; similar terms were used in Iran and Central Asia. By 1906, bicycles had become part of the urban landscape of Istanbul, used by the police, postal workers, and the army as a means of transport, but also regarded as a vehicle for "sport". Cyclists were also seen in other port cities on the eastern Mediterranean. As bicycles became more affordable, they were used by students and intellectuals.

According to Alon Raab, a professor of Religious Studies at UC Davis, opposition to cycling in the Ottoman Empire was quick to form from conservatives and religious fundamentalists who frequently criticized bicycles as the Devil's Chariot. Orthodox scholars claimed that cycling would harm reproductive organs, embolden sexual permissiveness and lead to the destruction of the family. Raab additionally notes that their unmentioned objective was to keep women in their homes and to restrict non supervised contact between men and women. Raab reports that many Muslim religious authorities castigated women's cycling as bid’ah (any technical innovation deemed heretical). He points out that women's cycling was not only criticized in the media and by law but in some places female cyclists faced physical assaults. He reports nevertheless, that despite opposition, in the early 20th-century women in the Ottoman Empire went on to adopt cycling for varied purposes with a new sense of freedom. Feminist activists' efforts to expand the political rights of women, like those of Fatma Aliye Topuz, were helped along by the bicycle.

== Perspectives ==
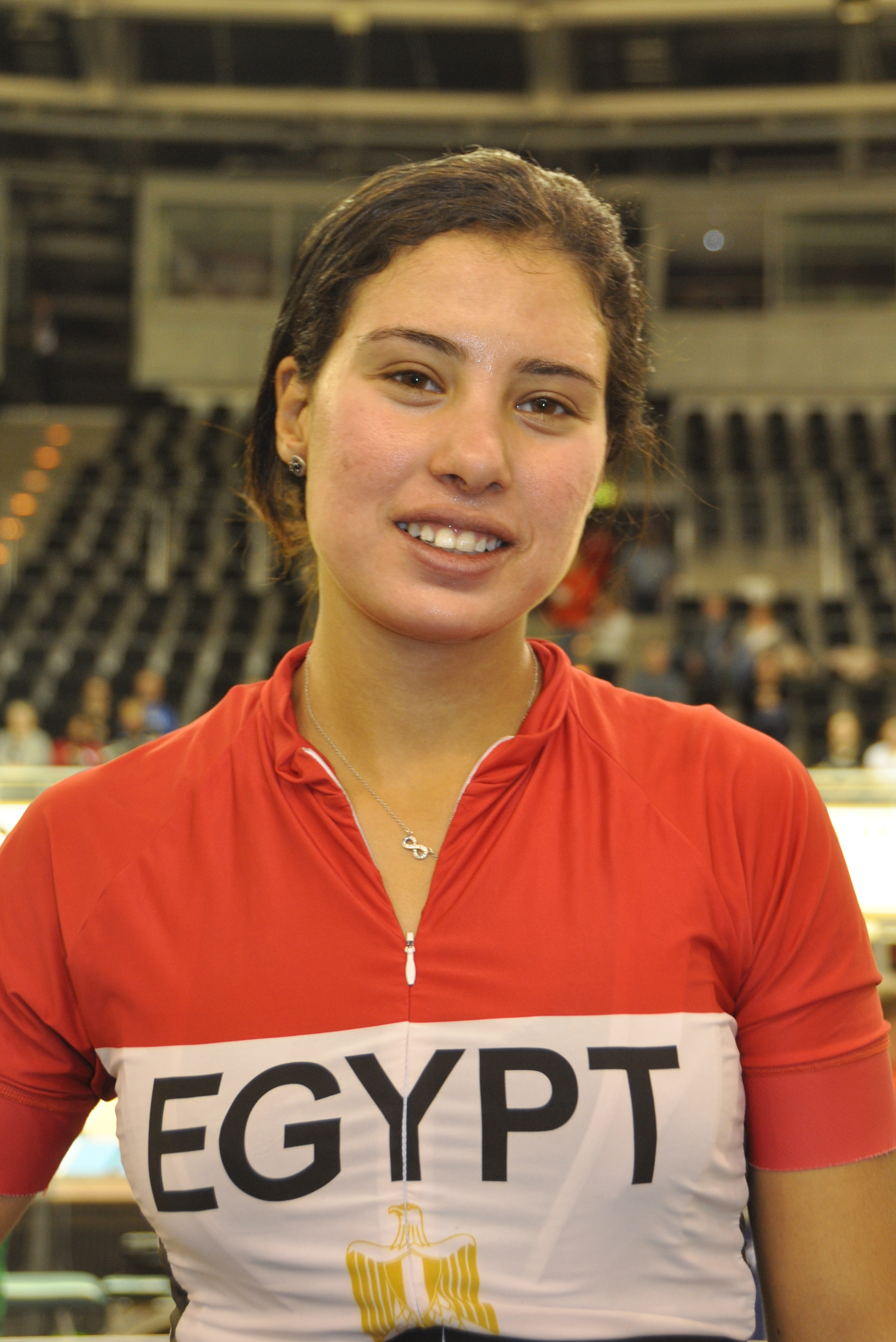
Ebtissam Zayed Ahmed Mohamed is an Egyptian road and track cyclist.

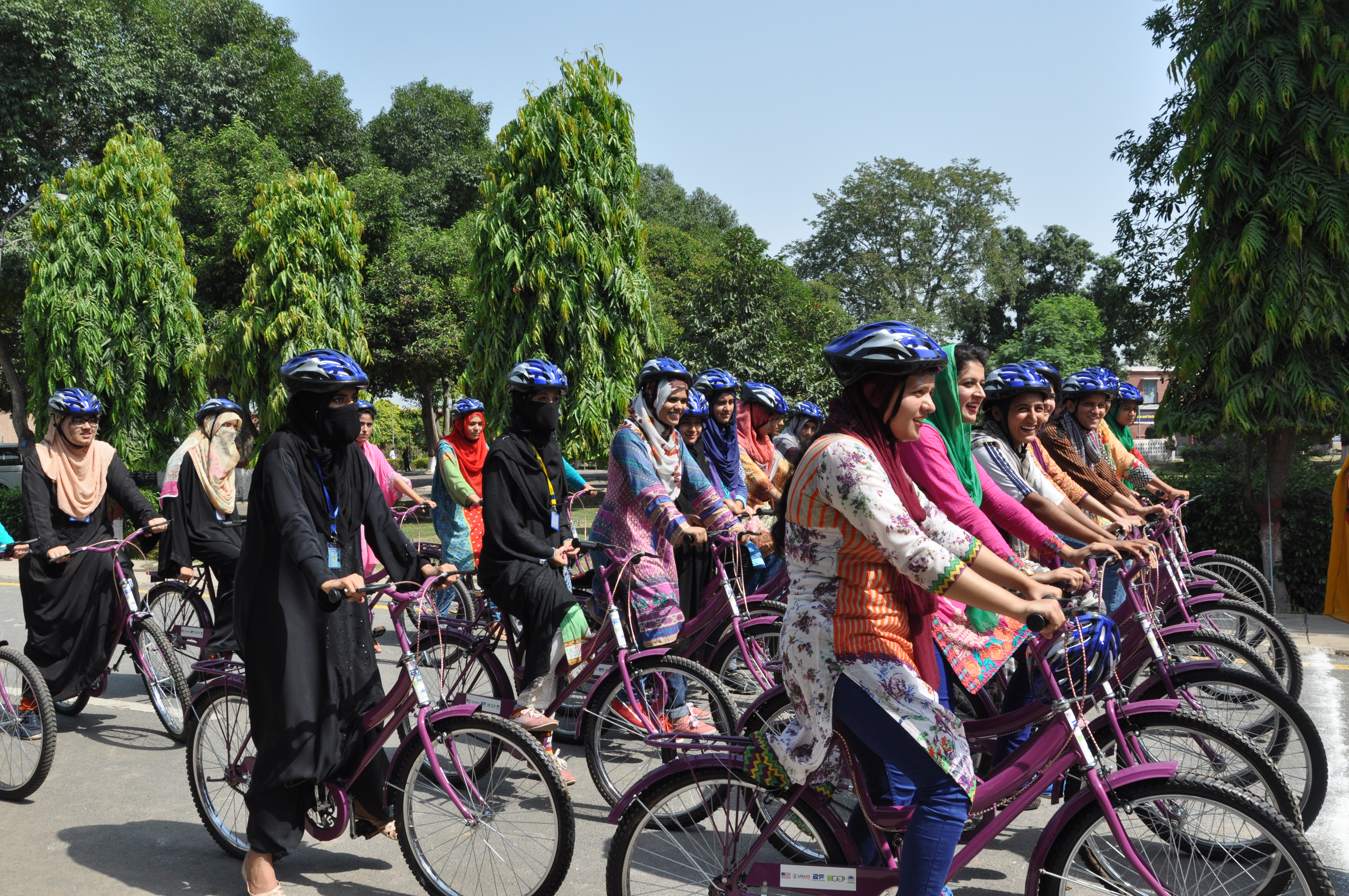
Female agriculture students in Faisalabad, Pakistan, ride donated bicycles around campus.

=== Conservative perspectives ===
The primary concern of religious scholars is that bicycling, especially in public spaces, could lead to increased sexual promiscuity. This belief is based on the Quran's requirement that women should protect their chastity. It initially led to the prohibition of horseback riding and was later extended to cycling.

The 1977 book Women in the Arab World by the Egyptian feminist Nawal El Saadawi, reports that Arab culture used to place undue importance on female virginity. For example, a girl whose hymen was damaged as a result of sports activities like cycling or horse riding had to face negative consequences in her family life and social stature.

=== Critical response ===
Critics condemn bicycle bans and the proposed Iranian prohibition as tools of oppression. Traditions record that Muhammad encouraged parents to teach their children swimming, riding and archery. There is a commonly shared hadith that recounts a race between Muhammad and his wife, Aisha. Persian miniatures show Muslim women playing polo with men in the same field.

=== Iran ===
There is no law against women cycling in Iran, but women in Iran have sometimes been prevented for cycling by law enforcement, usually under general modesty laws. Official statements have been vacillating and inconsistent. Faezeh Hashemi drew official criticism for her advocacy for women's cycling in the 1990s. In 1996, advocates of women cyclists were attacked by vigilantes. Also in 1996, Ayatollah Khamenei is said to have told officials at the Ministry of Sports that "If you promote cycling then we will have girls cycling in the streets of Tehran. Clearly, this would not be appropriate. Tehrani women cycling in the city is not comparable to Chinese women cycling because with the Chinese, in the time of Mao and even later as we have seen, you could not really distinguish between men and women cycling on city streets. Especially with their kind of clothes. But women in Tehran with their tight pants and skin tight clothes getting on elaborate bicycles is sinful exposure."

In 2007, discussion of building a bicycle with "a boxy contraption that hides a woman's lower body" prompted ridicule.

A statement that women are banned from cycling (made by the head of police in Tehran, the capital city), was refuted by the head of Developments of Tehran Governor's Office in 2012. He said there were no legal prohibitions against women cycling in Tehran, and said that the cultural attitudes that discouraged women from cycling needed correction. In practice, bike rental shops in the city will not rent to women, as of 2016.

In the winter of 2015–2016, the Clean Tuesday Project aimed to improve air quality in Iranian cities with a weekly car-free day. Groups of cyclists gathered weekly to ride together, with crowds including government officials and women. Iran's Supreme Leader, cleric Ali Khamenei, ruled that "Cycling for women neither contravenes the law nor the Sharia." This was published in the Vaghayeh Etefaghieh daily newspaper, tweeted by Shahindokht Molaverdi, the Presidential Advisor on Women and Family Affairs, and, in the last week of August, proclaimed on signs held up by activists on major cycle routes in Tehran. Ayatollah Naser Makarem Shirazi commented in qualified support of this ruling, saying that there was nothing intrinsically wrong with women cycling, although individuals should evaluate the risk of danger or sinfullness raised by specific situations.

In Marivan in 2016, police stopped some women who were cycling, leading to extensive comment on social media. A group of women arrested for cycling in public in July 2016 (possibly the same group) were said to have been made to sign pledges that they wouldn't do it again. In Marivan, the local member of parliament issued a statement that the city officials and the Friday Mass Imam had nothing against cycling, as long as the women dressed in accordance with "the Islamic dress code". On the 30th of August, the city designated part of the Women's Park as a cycling area. On September 6, a "Clean Tuesday" ride in Tehran was broken up by police, despite the participation of government officials, on grounds that it did not have prior approval from the Municipal Security Council.

On September 18, Supreme Leader Ali Khamenei reversed his statement of some weeks before, saying in a written answer to an anonymous question that women were not allowed to cycle in public, nor in the presence of strangers. He issued a fatwa to state media, saying that "Riding a bicycle often attracts the attention of men and exposes the society to corruption, and thus contravenes women's chastity, and it must be abandoned [by women but not by men]".

The Iranian ban was widely defied; women continued to cycle and rent bicycles and share images of themselves cycling. The My Stealthy Freedom campaign included posts by female Iranian cyclists, and the Twitter hashtag #IranianWomenLoveCycling became popular.

In September 2018, Isfahan Friday Prayer Leader Ayatollah Yousef Tabatabaeinejad gave a sermon condemning women cycling, on the grounds that sinful glances at them would lead to moral corruption. On May 14, 2019, the Isfahan city prosecutor Ali Isfahani said women were forbidden to cycle, and announced an "Office for the Promotion of Virtue and Prevention of Vice" to prevent them from doing so. He proposed that the municipality and police design a bicycle for women with a "suitable cover".

== Cycling events and competitions ==
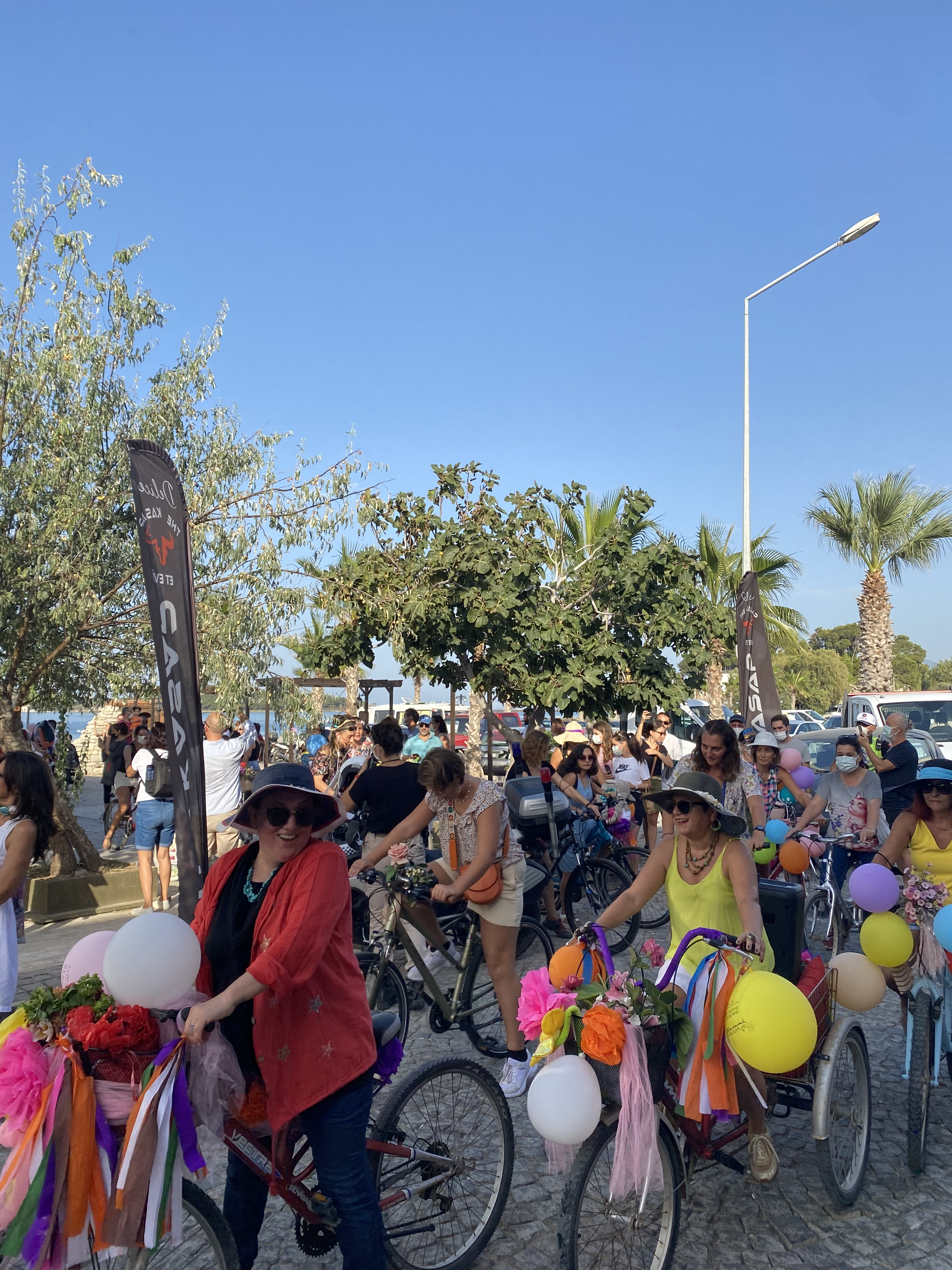
Süslü Kadınlar Bisiklet Turu @ -Urla

=== Olympic Games ===
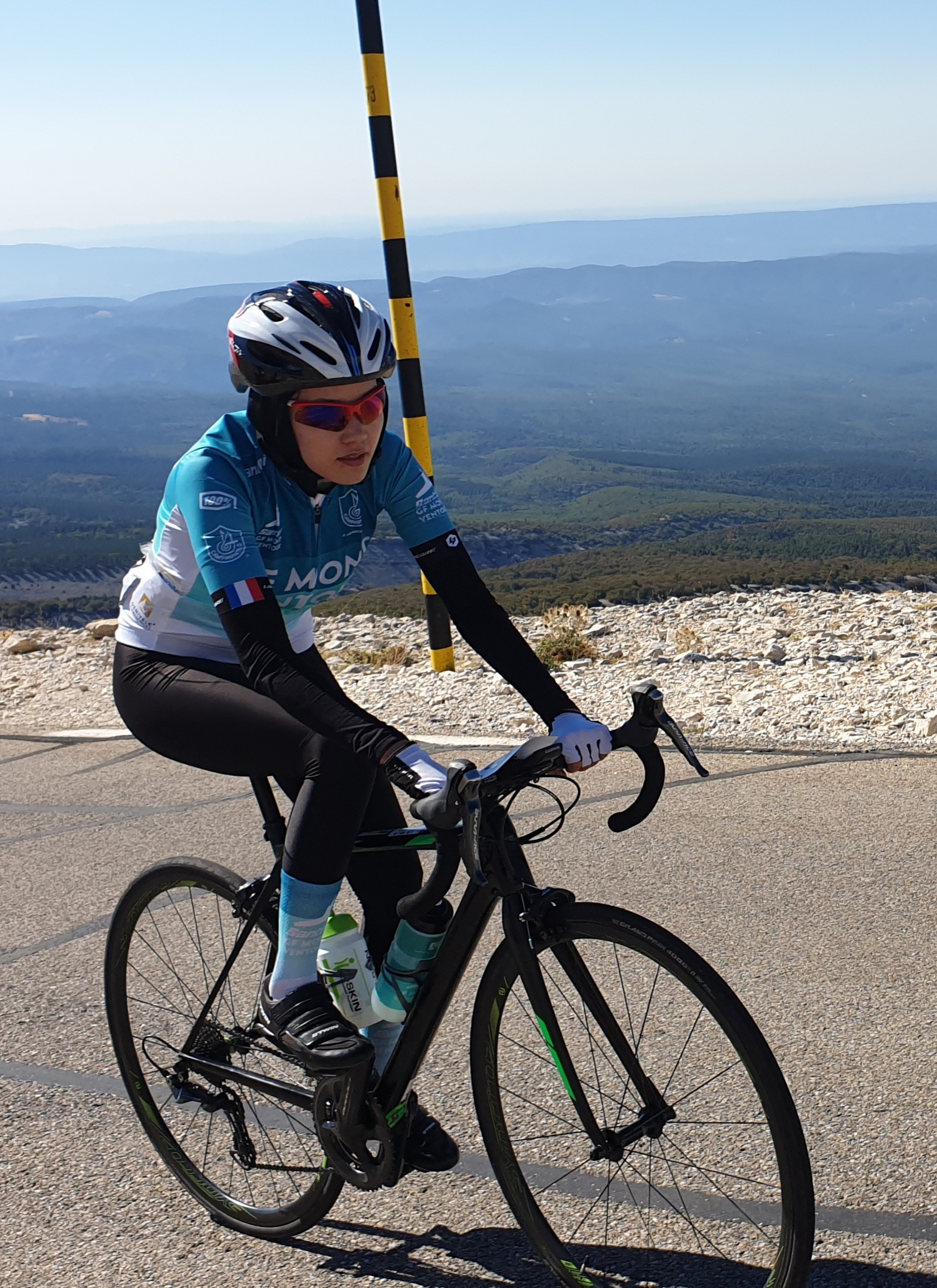
Masomah Ali Zada

Afghan road cyclist Masomah Ali Zada wears a sports hijab when bicycling.

== See also ==
- Al'Asayl Cycling Team
- Bicycling and feminism
- Bike boom
- Cycling at the 2021 Islamic Solidarity Games
- Gender roles in Islam
- Islamic feminism
- Muslim women in sport
- Outline of cycling
- The Blessing of the Bicycles (religious ceremony)
- Victorian dress reform for a discussion of "rational dress"
- Women's Islamic Games

== Bibliography ==
- White, Nóra. 'Cycling as Resistance: Women living under Islamic Authoritarianism', Vol. 5 No. 1 (2021-12-06): Trinity Women & Gender Minorities Review V Link PDF
- Lily Song, Mariel Kirschen and John Taylor. Gender and cycling in Solo, Indonesia. Singapore Journal of Tropical Geography Volume 40, Issue 1 p. 140-157 (13 July 2018) https://doi.org/10.1111/sjtg.12257
- Hossain Mohiuddin, Shaila Jamal, Md Musfiqur Rahman Bhuiya, To bike or not to bike: Exploring cycling for commuting and non-commuting in Bangladesh, Transportation Research Interdisciplinary Perspectives, Volume 14, 2022, ISSN 2590-1982, https://doi.org/10.1016/j.trip.2022.100614
- Raab Alon, Women cycling in the Middle East url=https://www.taylorfrancis.com/chapters/edit/10.4324/9781003142041-52/wheels-fire-alon-raab work=Routledge Companion to Cycling doi=10.4324/9781003142041-52/wheels-fire-alon-raab
