= Asma Elbadawi =

Sudanese-British spoken word poet, activist, basketball player and coach

Asma Elbadawi is a Sudanese-British spoken word poet, activist, basketball player and a coach. She is known to have petitioned and succeeded in convincing the International Basketball Association (FIBA) to remove a ban on hijabs and religious headwear in the professional sport.

== Early years and education ==
Elbadawi was born in Sudan but raised in the United Kingdom. Her family moved to Bradford, West Yorkshire when she was an infant. She holds a bachelor's degree in Photography, Video and Digital Imaging as well as a master's in Visual Arts.

== Career ==
Elbadawi began her career in sports while she was schooling in the university. She is a member of the Bradford Cobras basketball club.

In 2017, she petitioned the International Basketball Federation (FIBA) to remove their ban on religious headwear on the court. After over two years of campaigning to FIBA, she and her friends succeeded in getting 130,000 people to sign an online petition, and that resulted in the FIBA reversing their decision.

Aside sports, Elbadawi has made strides as a spoken word poet. Her poems mostly creates awareness about vital social issues. In 2017, to mark Women's Sport Week, a poem she wrote about being a female Muslim basketball player was featured on the BBC.

== Awards ==
- In 2016, she won BBC Radio 1xtra's Words First competition in Leeds.
- In 2019, she won the British Muslim Awards.
