= Beach volleyball at the 2019 African Games =

- Venue: Salé Beach
- Location: Salé, Morocco
- Dates: 22 – 31 August

Beach volleyball at the 2019 African Games were held from 22 to 31 August at the Salé Beach in Salé, Morocco.

== Medal table ==
Event	Gold	Silver	Bronze
Men	The Gambia; Sainey Jawo; Mbye Babou Jarra	Morocco; Mohamed Abicha; Zouheir El Graoui	Rwanda; Patrick Kavalo Akumuntu; Olivier Ntagengwa
Women	Egypt; Farida El Askalany; Doaa Elghobashy	Kenya; Gaudencia Makokha; Naomie Too	Mozambique; Géssica Moiane; Mércia Mucheza
