= Natacha Rigobert =

Mauritian beach volleyball player

Personal information
- Born: 7 October 1980 (age 46); Beau-Bassin, Mauritius
- Height: 1.80 m (5 ft 11 in)
- Weight: 75 kg (165 lb)
Honours
Women's beach volleyball
Representing Mauritius
All-Africa Games
Gold medal – first place	2011 Maputo	Doubles

Nathacha Rigobert (born 7 October 1980) is a Mauritian beach volleyball player. As of 2012, she plays with Elodie Li Yuk Lo. The pair played in the 2012 Summer Olympics tournament and were eliminated in the group stage.

Olympic Games
Preceded by Stéphan Buckland	Flagbearer for Mauritius; 2012 London	Succeeded by Kate Foo Kune
