= Elodie Li Yuk Lo =

Mauritian beach volleyball player

Personal information
- Full name: Nioun Chin Elodie Li Yuk Lo
- Born: 29 September 1982 (age 44); Port Louis, Mauritius
Honours
Women's beach volleyball
Representing Mauritius
All-Africa Games
Gold medal – first place	2011 Maputo	Doubles

Nioun Chin Elodie Li Yuk Lo (born 29 September 1982) is a Mauritian beach volleyball player. As of 2012, she plays with Natacha Rigobert. The pair participated in the 2012 Summer Olympics tournament and were eliminated after losing their three pool matches against Brazil, the Czech Republic and Germany finishing 19th overall after the games.

She was born in Port Louis, Mauritius.
