= Freedom Chiya =

South African beach volleyball player (born 1979)

Personal information
- Nationality: South Africa
- Born: July 11, 1979 (age 47); KwaZulu Natal, Esikhawini, South Africa
- Height: 186 cm (73 in)
- Weight: 93 kg (205 lb)
Honours
Men's beach volleyball
Representing South Africa
All-Africa Games
Gold medal – first place	2011 Maputo	Doubles

Freedom Chiya (born 11 July 1979) is a South African male beach volleyball player. He competed for South Africa at the 2012 Summer Olympics with teammate Grant Goldschmidt. He was born in Cape Town, South Africa.
