= Mohamed Abicha =

Moroccan volleyball player (born 1980)

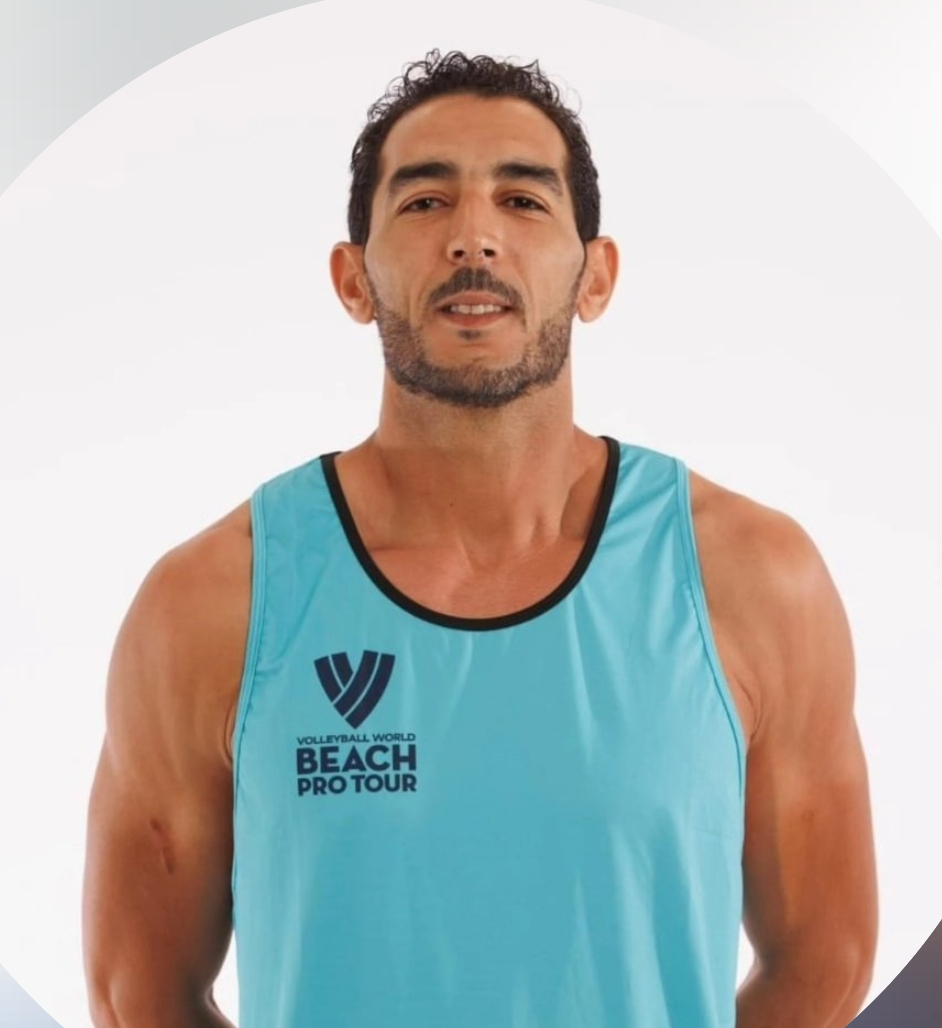

Personal information
- Nationality: Morocco
- Born: 16 January 1980 (age 46) Fez, Morocco
- Height: 193 cm (6 ft 4 in)

Sport
- Sport: Volleyball
Medal record
Men's beach volleyball
Representing Morocco
African Games
Gold medal – first place	2023 Accra	Team
Silver medal – second place	2019 Rabat	Team

Mohamed Abicha (born 16 January 1980) is a Moroccan volleyball player.

== Career highlights ==
Alongside Zouheir El Graoui, Abicha won the gold medal at the 2017 African Beach Volleyball Championships in Maputo and the 2019 African Beach Volleyball Championships in Abuja, a bronze medal at the 2019 All-Africa Beach Games in Sal and the silver medal at the 2019 African Games in Rabat.

=== 2020 Tokyo Summer Olympics ===
Abicha represented Morocco at the 2020 Summer Olympics alongside Zouheir El Graoui. The duo were defeated in all three beach volleyball events.
