= Beach volleyball at the 2023 African Games =

- Venue: Laboma Beach
- Location: Accra, Ghana
- Dates: 10–14 March 2024

Beach volleyball at the 2023 African Games were held from 10 to 14 March 2024 at the Laboma Beach in Accra, Ghana.

== Results ==
Event	Gold	Silver	Bronze
Men	Morocco; Mohamed Abicha; Soufiane El Gharouti	South Africa; Danilo von Ludwiger; Leo Frank Williams	Botswana; George Chiswaniso; Jack Sekao Boifang
Women	Egypt; Doaa Elghobashy; Marwa Abdelhady	Mozambique; Ana Sinaportar; Vanessa Muianga	Nigeria; Esther Mbah; Pamela Bawa
