= Doaa Elghobashy =

Egyptian beach volleyball player

Doaa el-Ghobashy
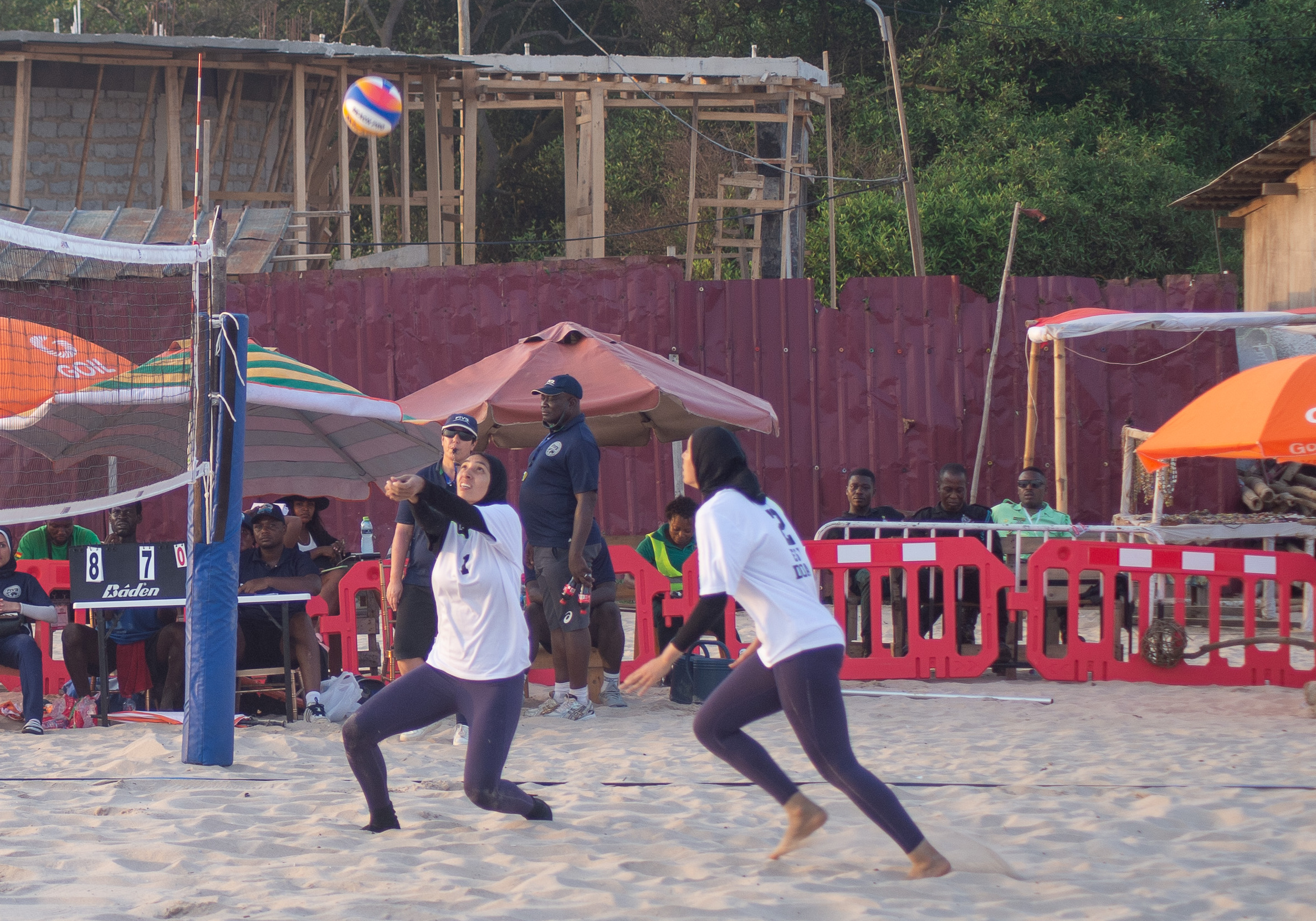
- Marwa Abdelhady (L) and Doaa Elghobashy for 2023 African Games

Personal information
- Nationality: Egyptian
- Born: 8 November 2006 (age 19)
- Hometown: Beheira Governorate
- Height: 180 cm (5 ft 11 in)

Beach volleyball information

Current teammate
Teammate
Nada Meawad

National team
2016	Egypt
Honours
Women's beach volleyball
Representing Egypt
African Games
Gold medal – first place	2019 Rabat	Team
Gold medal – first place	2023 Accra	Team

Doaa Elghobashy (Arabic: دعاء الغباشي; born 8 November 1996) is an Egyptian beach volleyball player.

== Career ==
Elghobashy competed in the 2016 Summer Olympics in Rio de Janeiro alongside Nada Meawad in the beach volleyball competition. She and Meawad qualified for the Games by winning the CAVB Continental Cup held in Nigeria.

The team turned heads in their first match against Germany as the team wore long sleeves and pants and Elghobashy wore a hijab, making her the first woman to wear a hijab in Olympic beach volleyball. The team was also Egypt's first ever Olympic team to compete in a beach volleyball tournament. Though Elghobashy and Meawad did not advance in the tournament, Elghobashy has become an inspiration for Muslim women, especially those in sports and who wear a headscarf, as she joined the ranks of the few Muslim women who compete in a headscarf.

Elghobashy has worn a hijab for 10 years and it has always been a part of her beach volleyball career. She was allowed to wear it in the Games after the international volleyball federation relaxed uniform regulations before the 2012 Summer Olympics in London.

== See also ==
- Muslim women in sport
