= Farida El Askalany =

Egyptian volleyball player (born 1995)

Personal information
- Full name: Farida Ahmed Magdy El Askalany
- Nationality: Egyptian
- Born: 14 February 1995 (age 31); Cairo, Egypt
- Hometown: Cairo
- Height: 183
- Weight: 70
- Spike: 305
- Education: American University in Cairo (AUC)

Volleyball information
- Position: centre block
- Current club: Zamalek FC
- Number: 10

Career
Teams
	Heliopolis

National team
9	Egypt
Honours
Women's beach volleyball
Representing Egypt
African Games
Gold medal – first place	2019 Rabat	Team

Farida El Askalany (born 14 February 1995) is an Egyptian female volleyball player. She was part of the Egypt women's national volleyball team.

She played volleyball in Heliopolis club since she was 7 years old. Farida joined the Egyptian national team at the age of 12. She participated in many African and World championships. She won the gold medal four times in different African championships, one time in the 2011 Pan Arab Games.
