= Zouheir El Graoui =

Moroccan volleyball player (born 1994)

Personal information
- Born: 1 July 1994 (age 32) Casablanca, Morocco
- Height: 1.97 m (6 ft 6 in)
- Weight: 88 kg (194 lb)

Volleyball information
- Position: Outside hitter
- Current club: Skra Bełchatów
- Number: 6

Career
- Years: Team
- 2010–2013 2015–2016 2016–2018 2018–2020 2020–2021 2021–2025 2025–: Tihad Sportif Club; Al Khor SC; Asswehly SC; Stade Poitevin Poitiers; Tours VB; Stal Nysa; Skra Bełchatów

National team
- Years: Team
- –: Morocco
Honours
Men's volleyball
Representing Morocco
CAVB African Championship
Bronze medal – third place	2015 Cairo
Men's beach volleyball
African Games
Silver medal – second place	2019 Rabat	Team

Zouheir El Graoui (born 1 July 1994) is a Moroccan professional indoor and beach volleyball player who plays as an outside hitter for Skra Bełchatów and the Morocco national team.

== Career ==
=== Beach volleyball ===
El Graoui won the gold medal at the 2017 African Beach Volleyball Championships in Maputo and the 2019 African Beach Volleyball Championships in Abuja, the bronze medal at the 2019 All-Africa Beach Games in Sal and the silver medal at the 2019 All-Africa Games in Rabat.

=== Indoor volleyball ===
El Graoui played for Tihad Sportif Club from 2010 to 2013, at Al Khor SC in Qatar from 2015 to 2016, and at Asswehly Sports Club in Libya from 2016 to 2017.

He played in France for Stade Poitevin Poitiers and Tours VB.

=== Olympic Games ===
El Graoui represented Morocco in the beach volleyball tournament at the 2020 Summer Olympics alongside Mohamed Abicha. The duo was defeated in all three games.

=== Individual awards ===
- 2021: CAVB African Championship – Best receiver
