= Beach volleyball =

Team sport

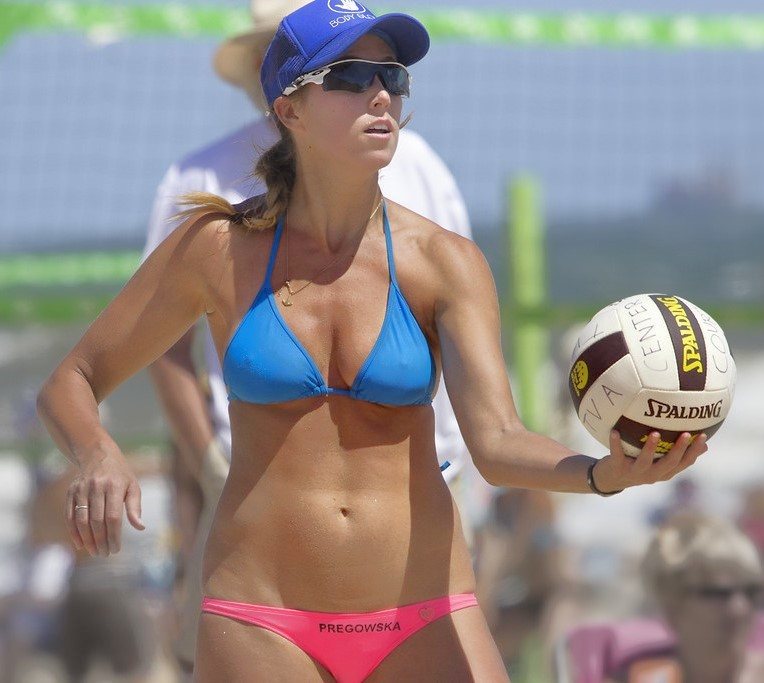
- A beach volleyball player prepares to serve during a match.
- Highest governing body: FIVB
- First played: 1915, Waikiki, Hawaii, United States

Characteristics
- Contact: No
- Team members: 2 or more per side
- Mixed-sex: Single and mixed
- Type: Outdoor, team sport, net sport
- Equipment: Beach volleyball
- Glossary: Volleyball jargon

Presence
- Country or region: Worldwide
- Olympic: Since 1996
- World Games: 1993

Pictogram for Beach volleyball at the Summer Olympics

Beach volleyball or beach volley for short, is a team sport played by two teams of two to six players each on a sand court divided by a net. Similar to indoor volleyball, the objective of the game is to send the ball over the net and to ground it on the opponent's side of the court. Each team also works together to prevent the opposing team from grounding the ball on their side of the court.

Teams are allowed up to three touches to return the ball across the net, and individual players may not touch the ball twice consecutively except after a touch off an attempted block. Making a block touch leaves only two more touches before the ball must be hit over. The ball is put in play with a serve—a hit by the server from behind the rear court boundary over the net to the opponents. The receiving team typically uses their three touches to pass the ball, set it up for an attack, and then attack the ball by sending it back over the net. Meanwhile, the team on defense typically has a blocker at the net and a defender to cover the ground. The rally continues until the ball is grounded on the playing court, goes "out", or a fault is made in the attempt to return the ball. The team that wins the rally scores a point and serves to start the following rally. The players serve in the same sequence throughout the match, changing server each time a rally is won by the receiving team.

Beach volleyball was most likely originated in 1915 on Waikiki Beach in Hawaii, while the modern two-player game originated in Santa Monica, California, where the first volleyball courts were put up on the beach. It has been an Olympic sport since the 1996 Summer Olympics. The Fédération Internationale de Volleyball (FIVB) is the international governing body for the sport, and organizes the FIVB Beach Volleyball World Championships and the FIVB Beach Volleyball World Tour.

== History ==
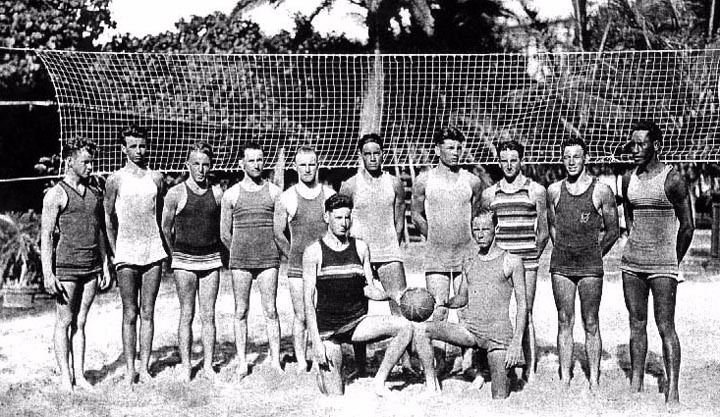
Beach volleyball players at the Outrigger Canoe Club in Hawaii, ca. 1915

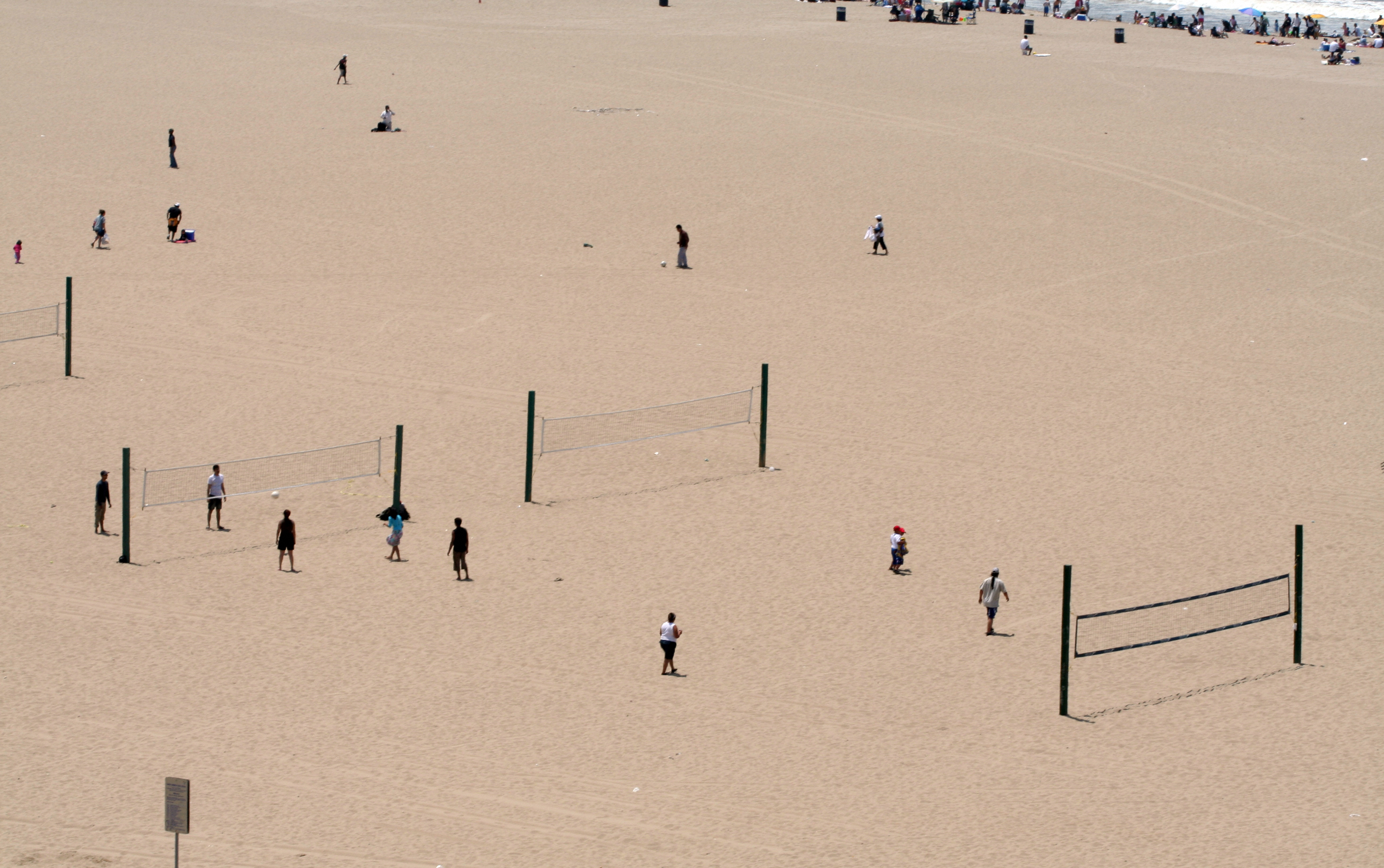
Public beach volleyball courts in Santa Monica, where the modern two-man version originated.

Beach volleyball is a variant of indoor volleyball, which was invented in 1895 by William G. Morgan. Beach volleyball most likely originated in 1915 on Waikiki Beach in Hawaii, at the Outrigger Canoe Club. According to a 1978 interview with an Outrigger Canoe Club member, George David "Dad" Center put a net up there, and the first recorded game of beach volleyball took place. In 1920, new jetties in Santa Monica, California created a large sandy area for public enjoyment. This planted the seed for beach volleyball development in that region. The first permanent nets began to appear, and people soon began playing recreational games on public parts of the beach and in private beach clubs. Eleven such beach clubs appeared in the Santa Monica area, beginning in late 1922. The first inter-club competitions were staged in 1924.

Most of these early beach volleyball matches were played with teams of at least six players per side, much like indoor volleyball. The concept of the modern two-man beach volleyball game is credited to Paul "Pablo" Johnson of the Santa Monica Athletic Club. In the summer of 1930, while waiting for players to show up for a six-man game at the Santa Monica Athletic Club, Johnson decided to try playing with only the four people present, forming two two-man teams for the first recorded beach volleyball doubles game. The players realized that with fewer players on the court, a taller player's height advantage could be neutralized by a shorter player's speed and ball control. The popularity of the two-man game spread to other nearby beach clubs and eventually to the public courts. The two-player version of the game is the most widely played version as well as the only one contested at an elite level.

Beach volleyball grew in popularity in the United States during the Great Depression in the 1930s as it was an inexpensive activity. The sport also began to appear in Europe during this time. By the 1940s, doubles tournaments were being played on the beaches of Santa Monica for trophies. In 1948 the first tournament to offer a prize was held in Los Angeles. It awarded the best teams with a case of Pepsi. In the 1960s, an attempt to start a professional volleyball league was made in Santa Monica. It failed, but a professional tournament was held in France for 30,000 French francs. In the 1950s, the first Brazilian beach volleyball tournament was held, sponsored by a newspaper publishing company. The first Manhattan Beach Open was held in 1960, a tournament which grew in prestige to become, in the eyes of some, the "Wimbledon of Beach Volleyball".

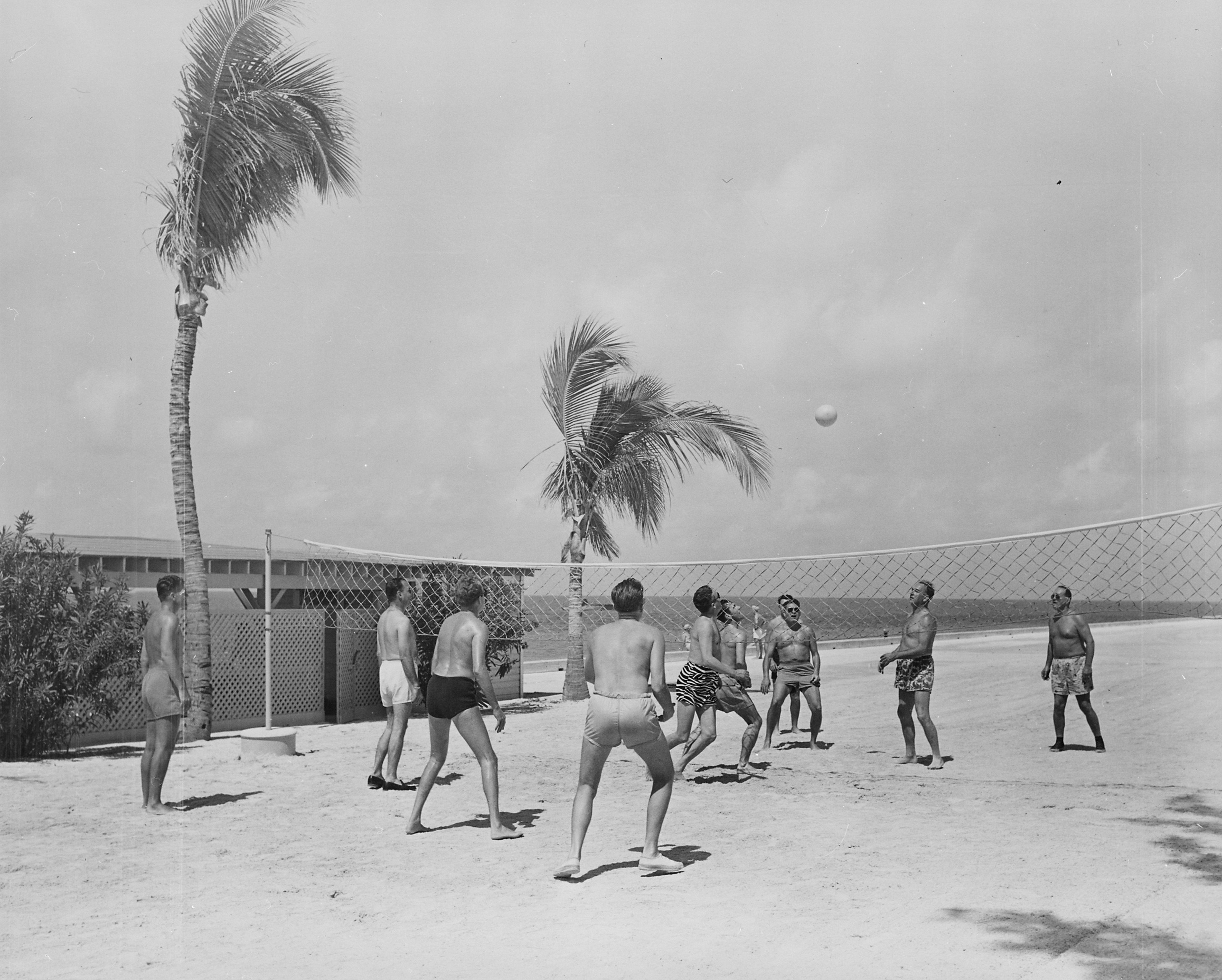
A beach volleyball game between members of President Harry S. Truman's vacation party at Key West, Florida in 1950

In the meantime, beach volleyball gained popularity: in the 1960s The Beatles tried playing in Los Angeles and US president John F. Kennedy was seen attending a match. In 1974, there was an indoor tournament: "The $1500.00 World Indoor Two-Man Volleyball Championship" played in front of 4,000 volleyball enthusiast at the San Diego Sports Arena. Fred Zuelich teamed with Dennis Hare to defeat Ron Von Hagen and Matt Gage in the championship match, Winston Cigarettes was the sponsor. Dennis Hare went on to write the first book on the subject of beach volleyball: The Art of Beach Volleyball.

The first professional beach volleyball tournament was the Olympia World Championship of Beach Volleyball, staged on Labor Day weekend, 1976, at Will Rogers State Beach in Pacific Palisades, California. The event was organized by David Wilk of Volleyball magazine, based in Santa Barbara. The winners, the first "world champions", were Greg Lee and Jim Menges. They split US$2,500 out of a total prize purse of US$5,000.

Volleyball magazine staged the event the next year at the same location, this time sponsored by Schlitz Light Beer. In 1978 Wilk formed a sports promotion company named Event Concepts with Craig Masuoka and moved the World Championship of Beach Volleyball to Redondo Beach, California. Jose Cuervo signed on as sponsor and the prize purse. The event was successful and Cuervo funded an expansion the next year to three events. The California Pro Beach Tour debuted with events in Laguna Beach, Santa Barbara and the World Championship in Redondo.

In following years the tour expanded nationally and was renamed the Pro Beach Volleyball Tour. It consisted of five events in California and tournaments in Florida, Colorado, and Chicago. By 1984, the Pro Beach consisted of 16 events around the country and had a total prize purse of US$300,000. At the end of the year, however, Event Concepts was forced out of the sport by a players' strike at the World Championship and the Association of Volleyball Professionals (AVP) was founded. In 1987 the Women's Professional Volleyball Association was founded and lasted until 1997 when the women joined the AVP tour.

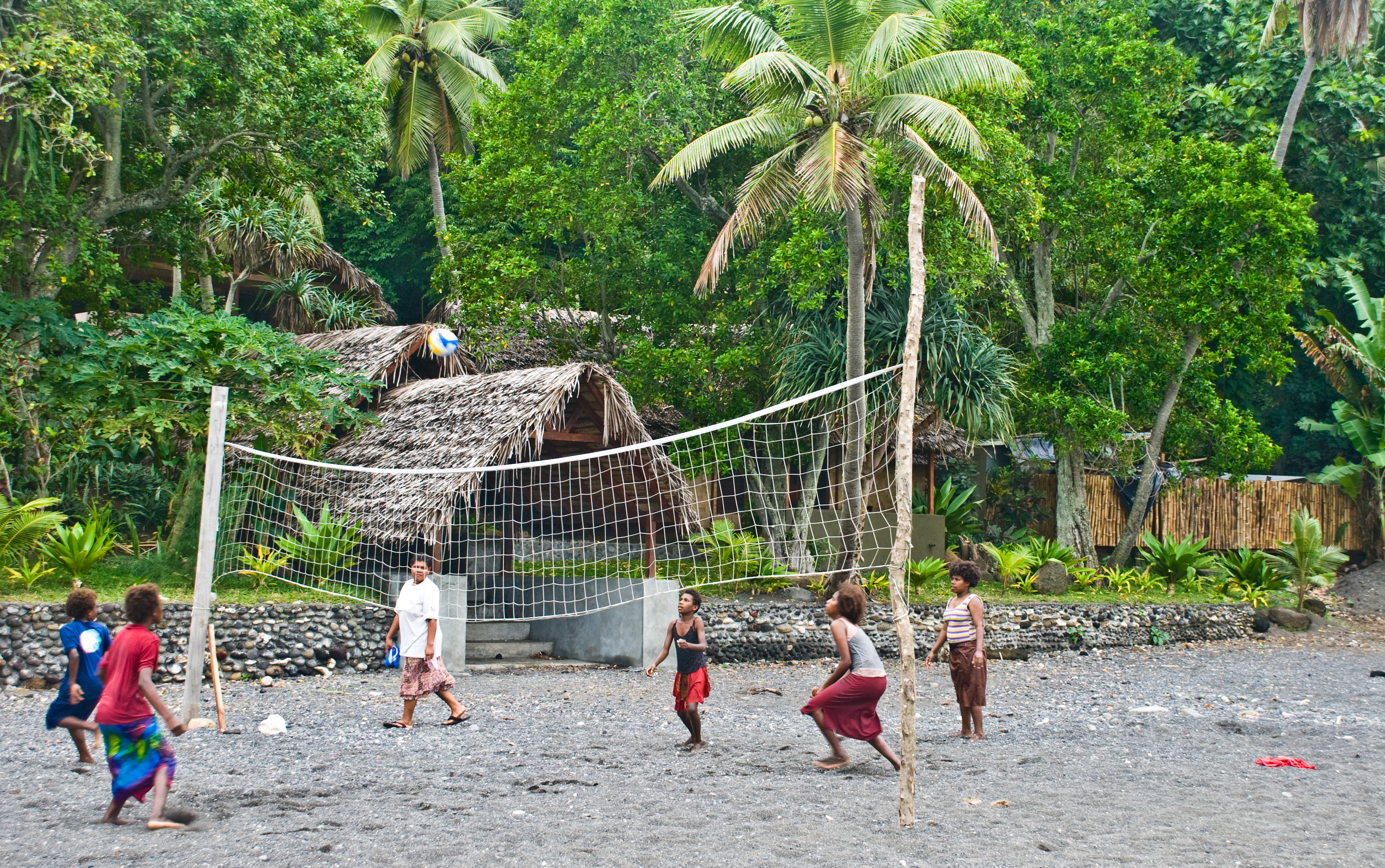
A beach volleyball game in Tanna, Vanuatu (2009)

At the professional level, the sport remained fairly obscure until the 1980s when beach volleyball experienced a surge in popularity with high-profile players such as Sinjin Smith, Randy Stoklos, and Karch Kiraly. Kiraly won an Olympic gold medal in beach volleyball in its first Olympic appearance in 1996, adding that to the two Olympic golds he won as part of the USA men's indoor team, In the 1980s, the sport gained popularity on the beaches of Copacabana and Ipanema in Rio de Janeiro, Brazil. In 1986, the first international beach volleyball exhibition was held in Rio de Janeiro with 5,000 spectators.

In 1987, the first international FIVB-sanctioned tournament was played on Ipanema beach in Rio de Janeiro, with a prize purse of US$22,000. It was won by Sinjin Smith and Randy Stoklos. In 1989, the first FIVB-sanctioned international circuit, called the World Series, was organized with men's tournaments in Brazil, Italy and Japan. The FIVB and its continental confederations began organizing worldwide professional tournaments and laid the groundwork for the sport's Olympic debut in 1996. The first FIVB Beach Volleyball World Championships and FIVB Beach Volleyball World Tour were held the following year. By 1998, the sport had been added to other multi-sport events including the Pan American Games, Central American Games, Southeast Asian Games, Goodwill Games and Universiade. In 2001, the FIVB began organizing the annual FIVB Beach Volleyball U21 World Championships, with the annual FIVB Beach Volleyball U19 World Championships beginning the following year.

== Rules ==
The Fédération Internationale de Volleyball (FIVB) is the international governing body for the sport. The FIVB publishes the Official Beach Volleyball Rules every four years, as approved by the FIVB congress, which provides the framework for how beach volleyball is played internationally. The rules have changed through the years: the court size became smaller, side out scoring was replaced by rally scoring and let serves were allowed. Beach volleyball differs from indoor, especially in requiring "clean hands" while setting. In other words, both of your hands have to contact the ball during the set at the same time. The ball can also not be caught or thrown, otherwise, the referee will call your set a "double" or "lift". How strictly the hand-setting rules are interpreted, changes regularly. Since 2025, for example, the FIVB has been testing a rule under which slightly rotating sets are no longer called as a "double".

=== Court ===
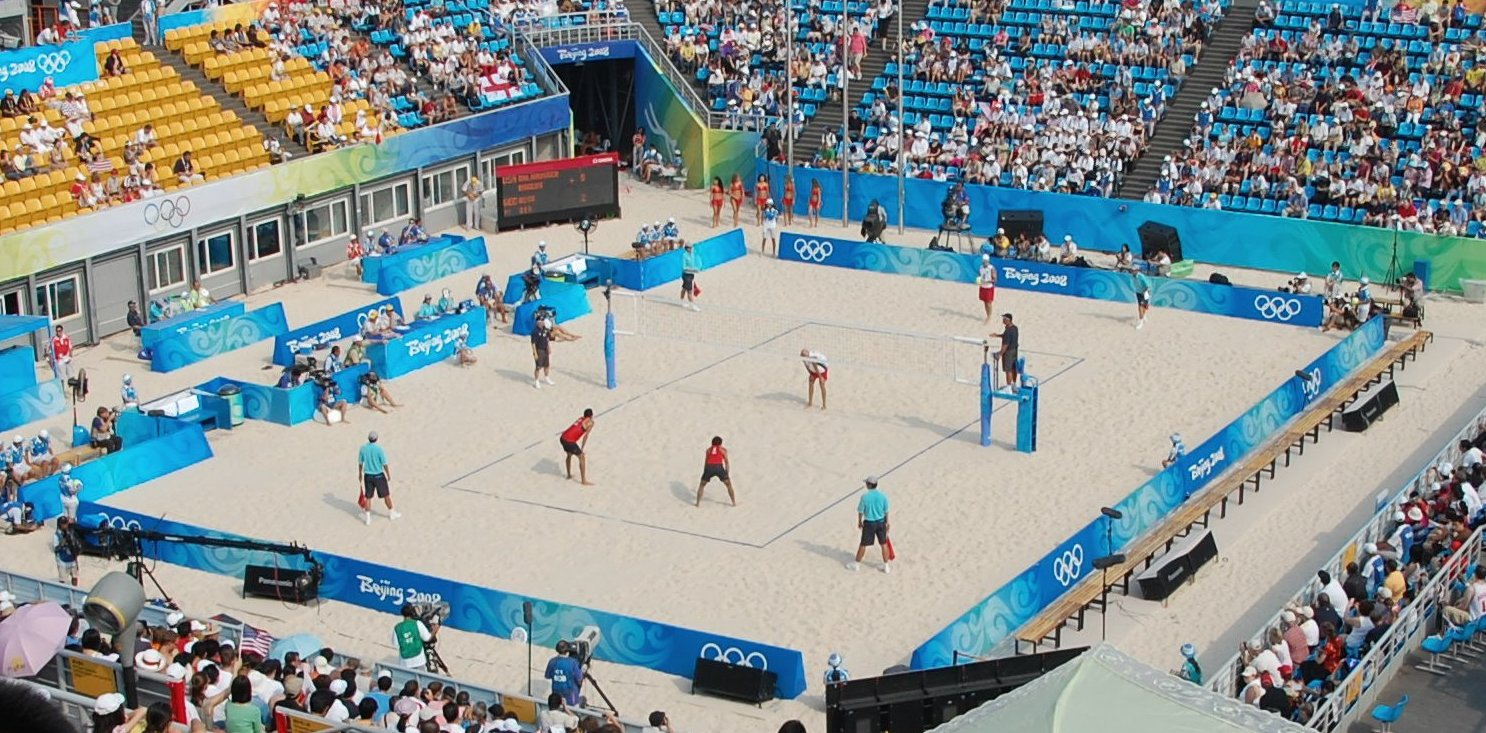
A beach volleyball match at the 2008 Summer Olympics

Beach volleyball is played on a rectangular sand court. The court is 16 m (52.5 ft) long and 8 m (26.2 ft) wide, surrounded by a clear space, which is at least 3 m (9.8 ft) wide on all sides. The minimum height clearance for beach volleyball courts is 7 m (23.0 ft). The sand should be as leveled as possible and free of potential hazards such as rocks that could cause injuries to players.

The court is divided into equal halves by a net that is 8.5 m (27.9 ft) long and 1 m (3 ft 3.4 in) wide. The top of the net is 2.43 m (7 ft 11 11/16 in) above the center of the court for men's competition, and 2.24 m (7 ft 4 3/16 in) for women's competition, varied for veterans and junior competitions. An antenna, 1.8 m (5 ft 10.9 in) long and 20 mm (0.8 in) in diameter, is attached to each side edge of the net. The antennas are considered part of the net and extend 80 cm (31.5 in) above it, forming the lateral boundaries within which the ball is allowed to cross.

Two side lines and two end lines, measuring 5 cm (2.0 in) wide, delineate the playing court.

=== Ball ===
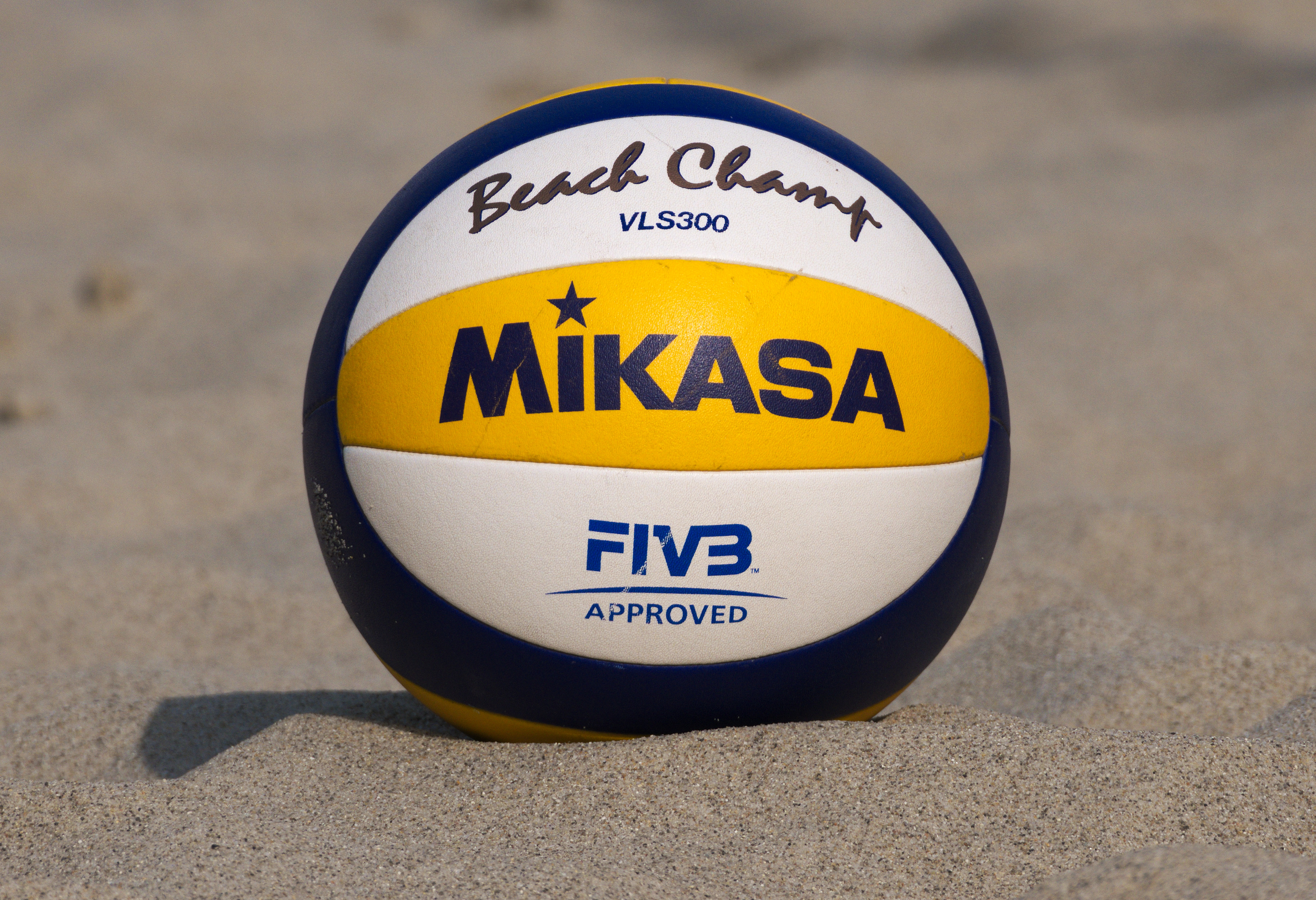
Mikasa VLS300, official ball for the 2017 FIVB Beach Volleyball World Tour

FIVB regulations state that the ball must be spherical and made of water resistant, flexible material, such that it is appropriate for outdoor conditions. A beach volleyball ball has a circumference of 66–68 cm, a weight of 260–280 g and an inside pressure of 0.175–0.225 kg/cm^{2}. In 2022, the official ball of the AVP (Association of Volleyball Professionals) tour is the Wilson OPTX AVP, and the official ball of the FIVB (Fédération Internationale de Volleyball) beach volleyball tour is the Mikasa VLS300. This ball was replaced with the new Mikasa Beach Pro BV550C, and was introduced in 2023.This ball was also used in the 2024 Paris Olympics.

=== Teams ===
A team is composed exclusively of two players, who must always be in play and who cannot be subjected to any substitutions or replacement. At the moment the ball is hit by the server, each team must be within its own court (with the exception of the server), but there are no determined positions on the court, such that no positional faults can be committed.

=== Scoring ===
==== Point, set, match ====
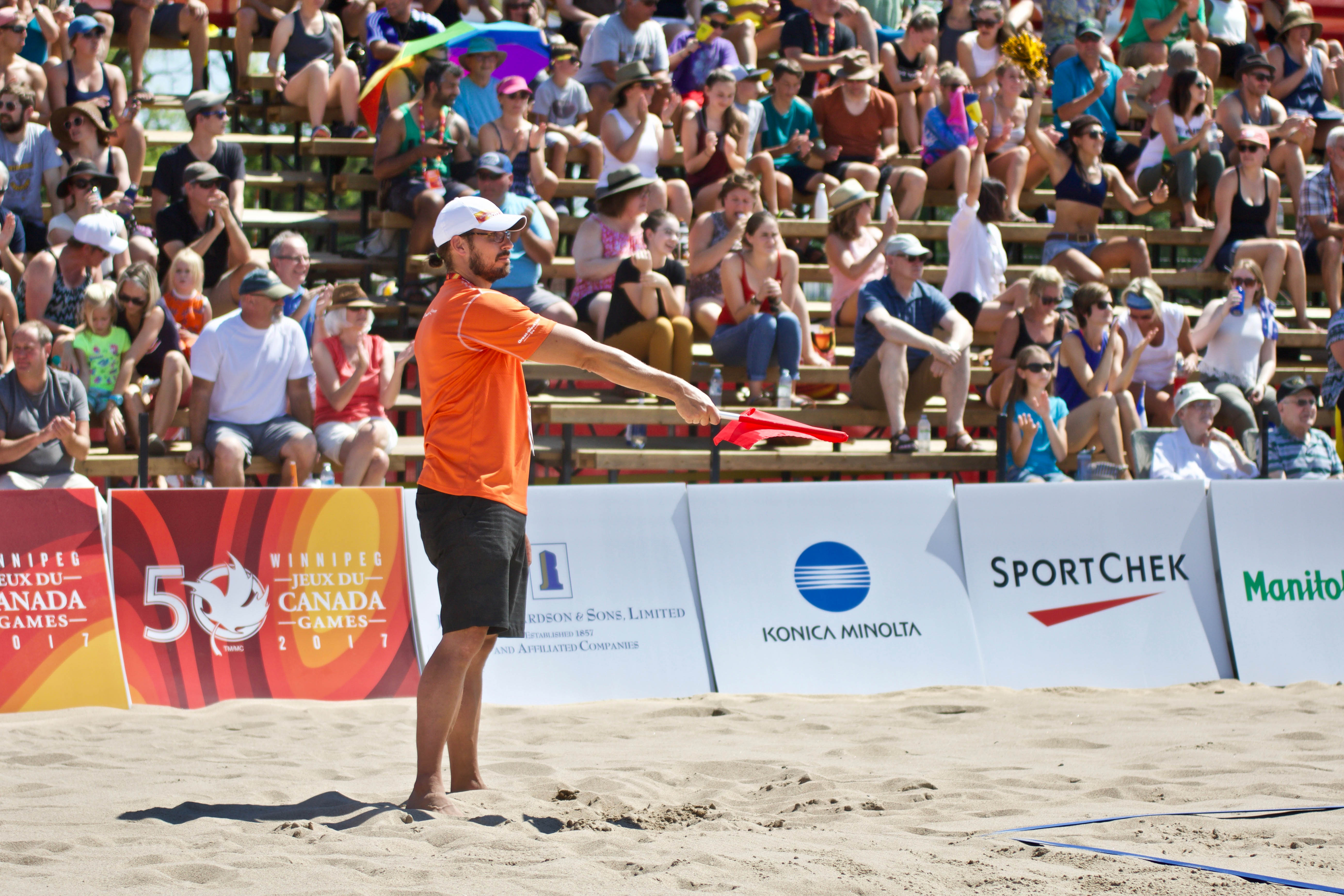
A linesman signals that a ball is "in"

A team scores a point when: the ball lands on the opposing team's court; the opposing team hits the ball "out"; the opposing team commits a fault; or the opposing team receives a penalty. The team that won the point serves for the next point. The ball is considered "out" if it: lands on the ground completely outside the boundary lines (a ball is "in" if any part of it touches a sideline or end-line); touches an object or person (who is not a player) outside the court; touches the net's antennae; does not cross the net's lateral boundaries (within the antennae) during service or during a team's third contact; crosses completely under the net.

A set is won by the first team to reach 21 points (15 points in the deciding final set) with a two-point advantage. Thus, if the score is 20–all (or 14–all in a final set) or at any tie hereafter, whoever scores two straight points wins. A match is won by whoever wins two sets.

==== Faults ====
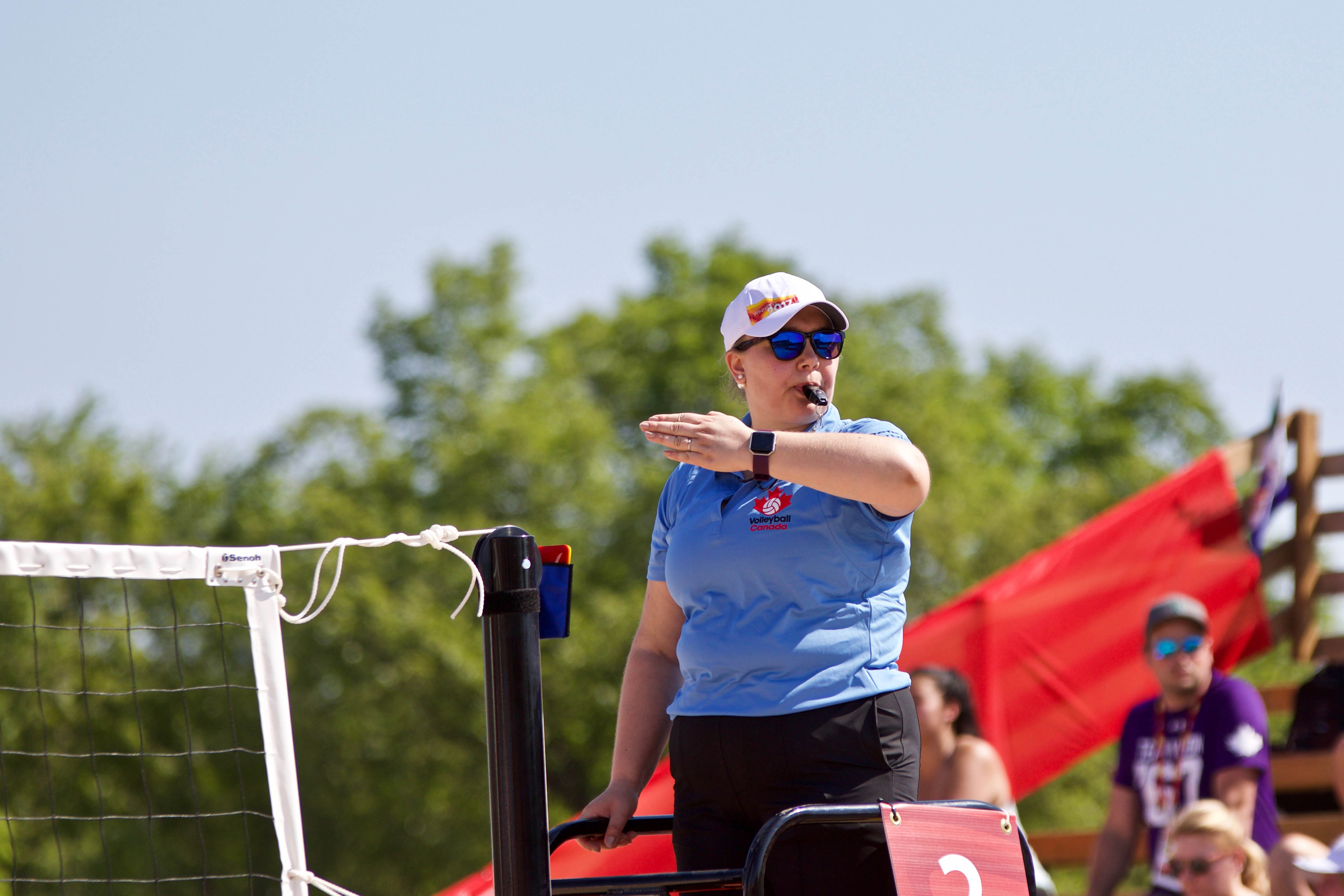
A beach volleyball referee determines if a fault has been committed.

A fault is committed when a referee judges that a team has made a playing action that violates the rules. When a team commits a fault, the opposing team receives a point and gains the right to serve. If both teams commit a fault simultaneously, the point is replayed. Common faults include:

- Four hits: when a team uses more than three contacts before returning the ball over the net
- Assisted hit: a player uses a teammate or any object as support to hit the ball within the playing area
- Double contact: when a player contacts the ball two times consecutively, except after a block touch
- Catch/lift: a player catches or throws the ball
- Service order fault: a team serves out of the service order
- Foot fault: a player's foot touches the court (including the end line) before or during a service hit
- Net touch: a player touches the net between the antennae or the antenna itself while playing the ball

=== Major rule changes ===
In the 1990s, the Fédération Internationale de Volleyball reduced the standard internal pressure for a beach volleyball ball from the indoor standard of 0.30–0.325 kgf/cm^{2} to 0.175–0.225 kgf/cm^{2}, and increased the standard circumference of the beach volleyball ball from the indoor standard of 65–67 cm to 66–68 cm.

In the 2001 season, the FIVB began testing rule changes to the court size and scoring system. The beach volleyball court dimension was reduced from the indoor court size of 9 m × 18 m (29.5 ft × 59.1 ft) to 8 m × 16 m (26.2 ft × 52.5 ft), and the scoring system was changed from sideout scoring, wherein only the serving team can score a point, to rally scoring, wherein a point is scored on every serve. The Association of Volleyball Professionals (AVP) adopted the FIVB's rule changes that same year, which upset many of the sport's purists at the time. The new rules were officially adopted by the FIVB in 2002.

=== Differences with the indoor game ===
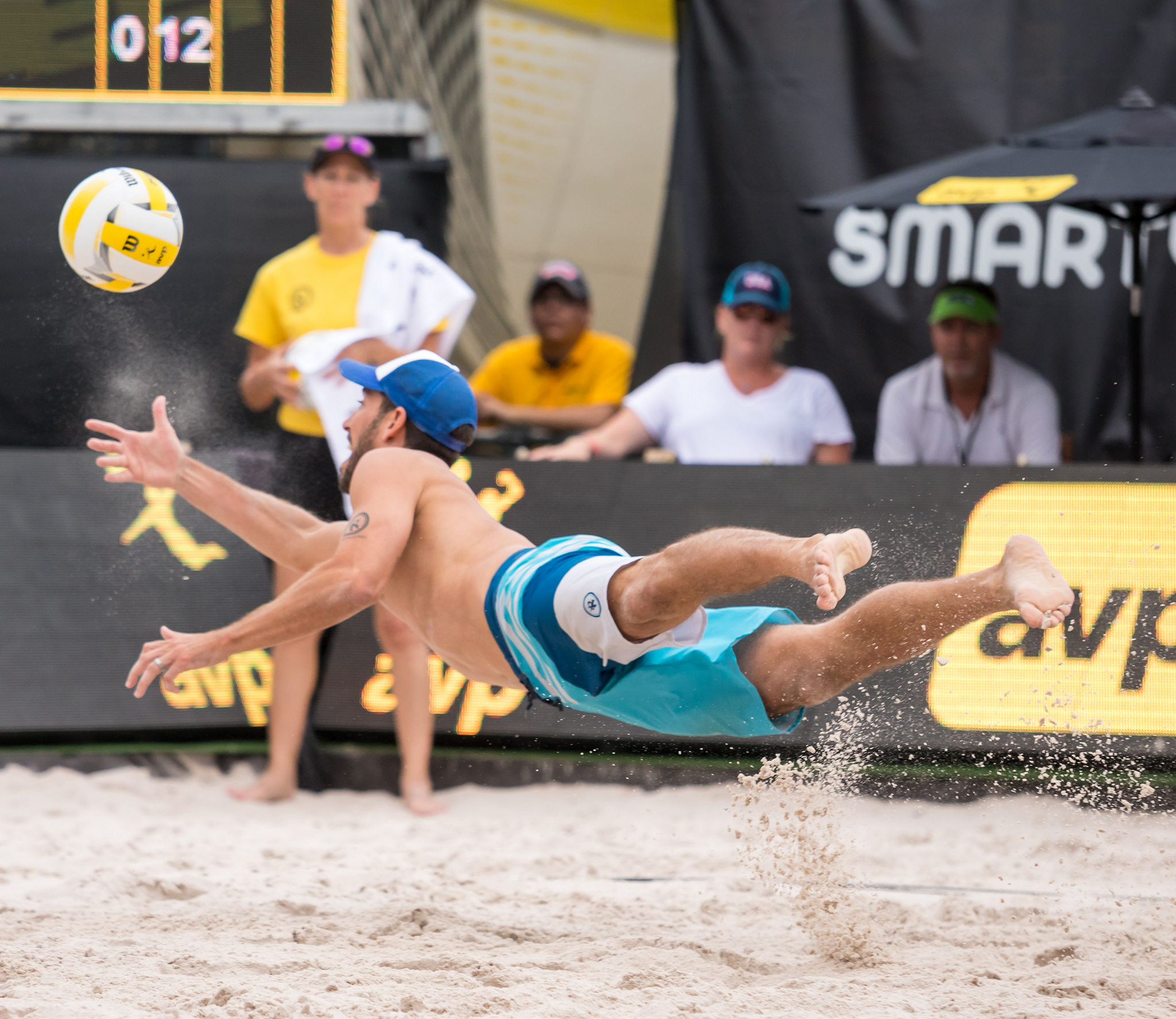
Unlike indoor volleyball, beach volleyball is played on soft sand which makes it safer for players to dive. Picture shows Nick Lucena of the United States diving to "dig" the ball.

Beach volleyball is fundamentally similar to indoor volleyball. However, there are several differences between the two games that affect players' strategies, gameplay and techniques.

The main differences in the rules of beach and indoor volleyball for international competitions governed by the FIVB include:

Facilities and equipment

- Playing surface: Beach volleyball is played on sand courts instead of hard courts as in indoor volleyball. The softer sand makes it more difficult for players to move and jump, but also reduces the likelihood of injuries such as jumper's knee. Footwear is not required and players usually play barefoot or with "sand socks".
- Environment: The beach game is often played outdoors, and environmental factors such as wind, rain and sun affect beach players' strategies.
- Court size: A beach volleyball court is 8 m × 16 m (26.2 ft × 52.5 ft), slightly smaller than the 9 m × 18 m (29.5 ft × 59.1 ft) indoor court.
- Balls: Beach volleyball balls are water-resistant and slightly larger than indoor balls, with a rougher external texture and a lower internal pressure to better suit the outdoor playing conditions.

Participants

- Number of players: There are two players on a beach volleyball team and no substitutions, compared to indoor volleyball which has six players and six substitutions per set. This means that beach volleyball players require a versatile skill set, as opposed to specializing in one skill. Fewer players on court also results in the utilization of a wider variety of attack shots in beach volleyball.
- Coaching during matches is not allowed, although exceptions are given for junior tournaments and can only occur when switching sides.
- Aside from alternating service order, there are no player-specific rules
  - No restrictions on which players can attack from which locations (as for back-row players or liberos in indoor volleyball)
  - No positional faults: players may switch positions at will

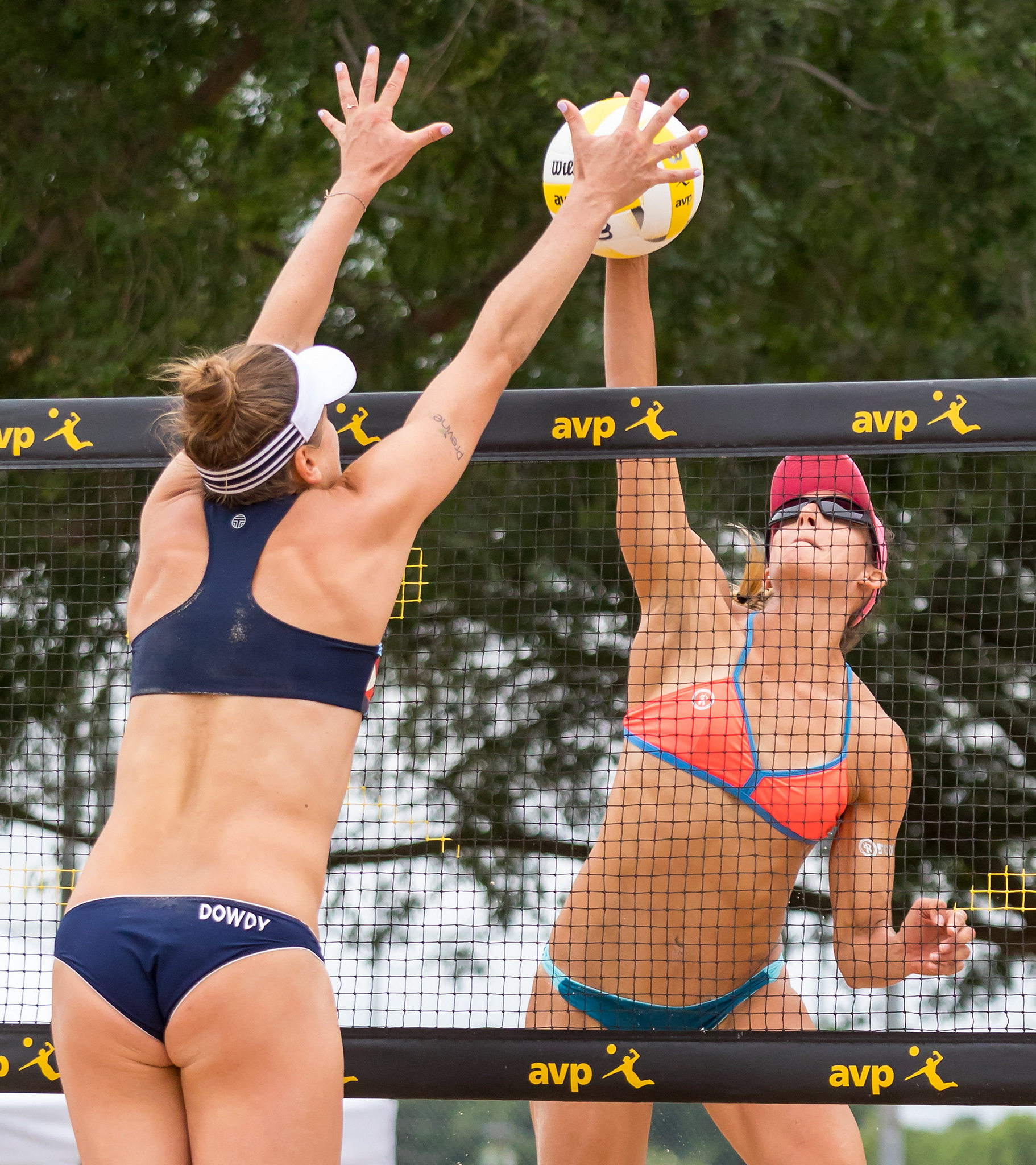
Unlike indoor volleyball, a touch off the block counts as one of the three allowed touches.

Playing format

- Scoring system: Matches are best of 3 sets played to 21 points (15 points for a deciding set).
- Switching sides: Teams switch ends of the court every seven points (every five points on a deciding set). This ensures that neither team has an advantage due to environmental factors such as wind and sun glare.

Playing actions

- Open hand tips and dinks are not allowed in two-man beach volleyball as they would allow players to score points too easily.
- A touch off the block counts as one of the three allowed touches, and either player may make the subsequent touch after the block.
- It is legal to cross under the net as long as it does not interfere with opponents' play.
- A ball set over the net as an attack must travel perpendicularly to the player's shoulder line.
- Each team has one time out per set, and there is an official time out in first and second sets when the score sums up 21 total points for both teams.

== Gameplay ==
A typical beach volleyball rally at the 2012 Summer Olympics, consisting of a serve, pass, set and attack

The teams start on opposite sides of the net. One team is designated the serving team and opposing team is the receiving team. A coin toss is conducted by the referee before the warm-ups to determine which team serves first and which sides of the court the teams start on for the first two sets. If a third deciding set is needed, another coin toss will be conducted prior to the third set. The service order decided at the coin toss before a set is maintained throughout the set.

For each point, a player from the serving team initiates the serve by tossing the ball into the air and attempting to hit the ball so it passes over the net on a course such that it will land in the opposing team's court. The opposing team must use a combination of no more than three contacts with the ball to return the ball to the opponent's side of the net, and individual players may not touch the ball twice consecutively except after a block touch. The three contacts usually consist first of the bump or pass by the receiving player, second of the set by the receiving player's teammate so that the ball's trajectory is aimed towards a spot where the receiving player can hit it, and third by the receiving player who spikes (jumping, raising one arm above the head and hitting the ball so it will move quickly down to the ground on the opponent's court) or shoots to return the ball over the net. The team with possession of the ball that is trying to attack the ball as described is said to be on offense.

The team on defense attempts to prevent the attacking team from directing the ball into their court: a player at the net jumps and reaches above the top (and if possible, across the plane) of the net to block the attacked ball. If the ball is hit around, above, or through the block, the defensive player positioned behind the blocker attempts to control the ball with a dig (usually a forearm pass). After a successful dig, the team transitions to offense.

The game continues in this manner, rallying back and forth, until the ball touches the court or until a fault is committed.

Teams switch ends of the court after every seven points (sets 1 and 2) and five points (set 3) played. There is a technical time-out when the total points of both teams add up to 21. Each team may also request one additional time-out per set.

=== Player specializations ===
While there are no fixed positions, competitive players generally have specialized defensive and offensive roles.

On defense, players may specialize as either a blocker or a defender:

- Blocker: A blocker is positioned at the net and is responsible for taking away part of the court (e.g. line or angle) with their block. Height, jumping ability, timing and positioning are important factors in blocking.
- Defender: A defender's responsibility is to position oneself in the backcourt area not covered by the block, so as to dig the hard-driven spike or chase down the soft shot. Agility, speed and digging skills are important factors in defense.

Some competitive teams have no specializations, with the two players taking turns blocking and playing defense. This style of play is known as split blocking and allows teams to conserve energy since the demand for energy on the sand is higher.

On offense, players tend to specialize in playing on either the right side or left side of the court. This allows for greater consistency in receiving serve and shot selection. Left-handed players generally prefer to play on the right side while right-handed players generally prefer to play on the left side, as it is easier to spike a ball that has not passed across the line of one's body. A player who is playing on the opposite side of their handedness is said to be playing on the on-hand side, while a player playing on the same side as their handedness is playing on the off-hand side.

=== Characteristics of a hit ===
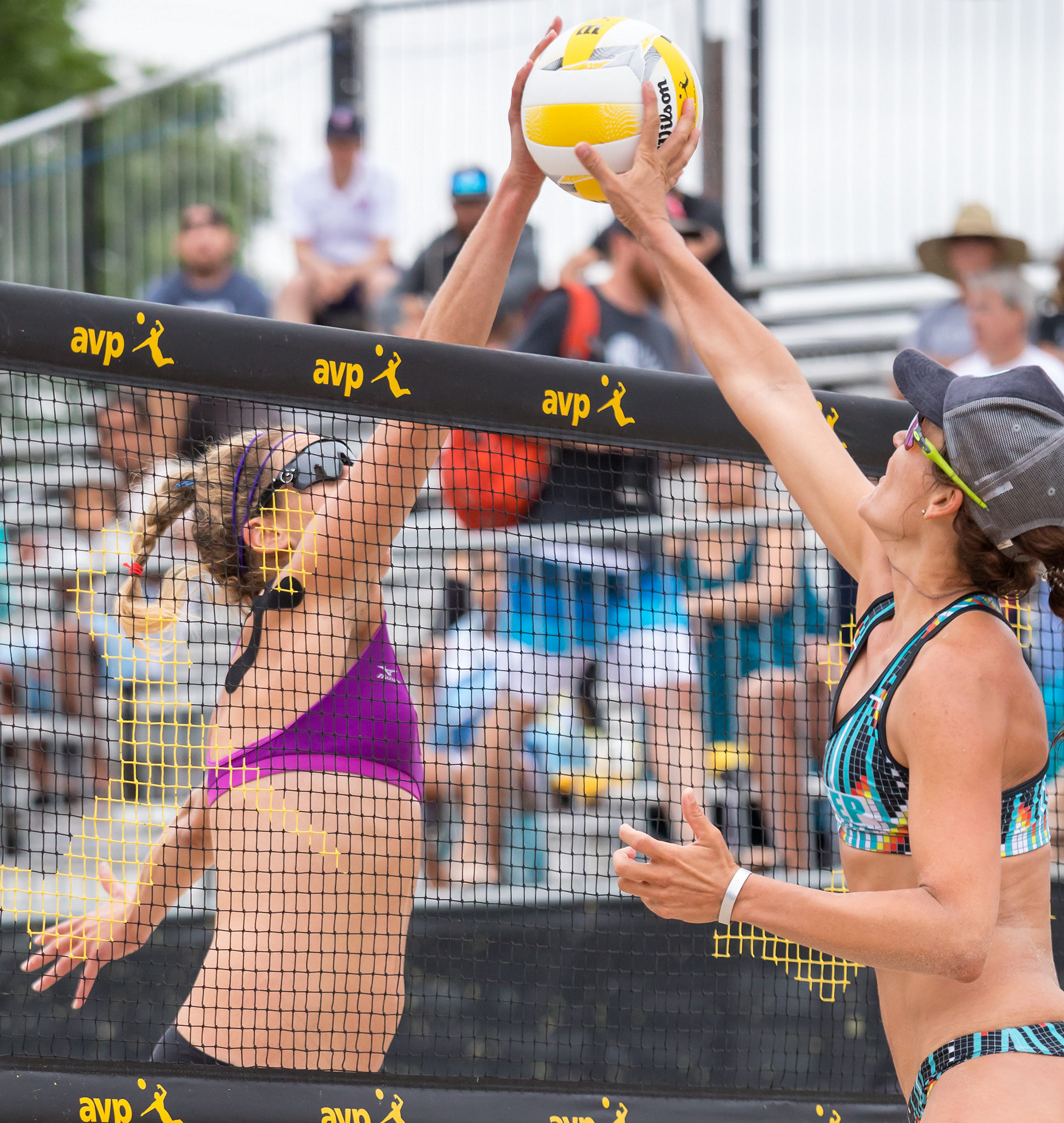
Two opposing players simultaneously contact the ball above the net with open hands, known as a "joust". The receiving team is entitled to another three contacts.

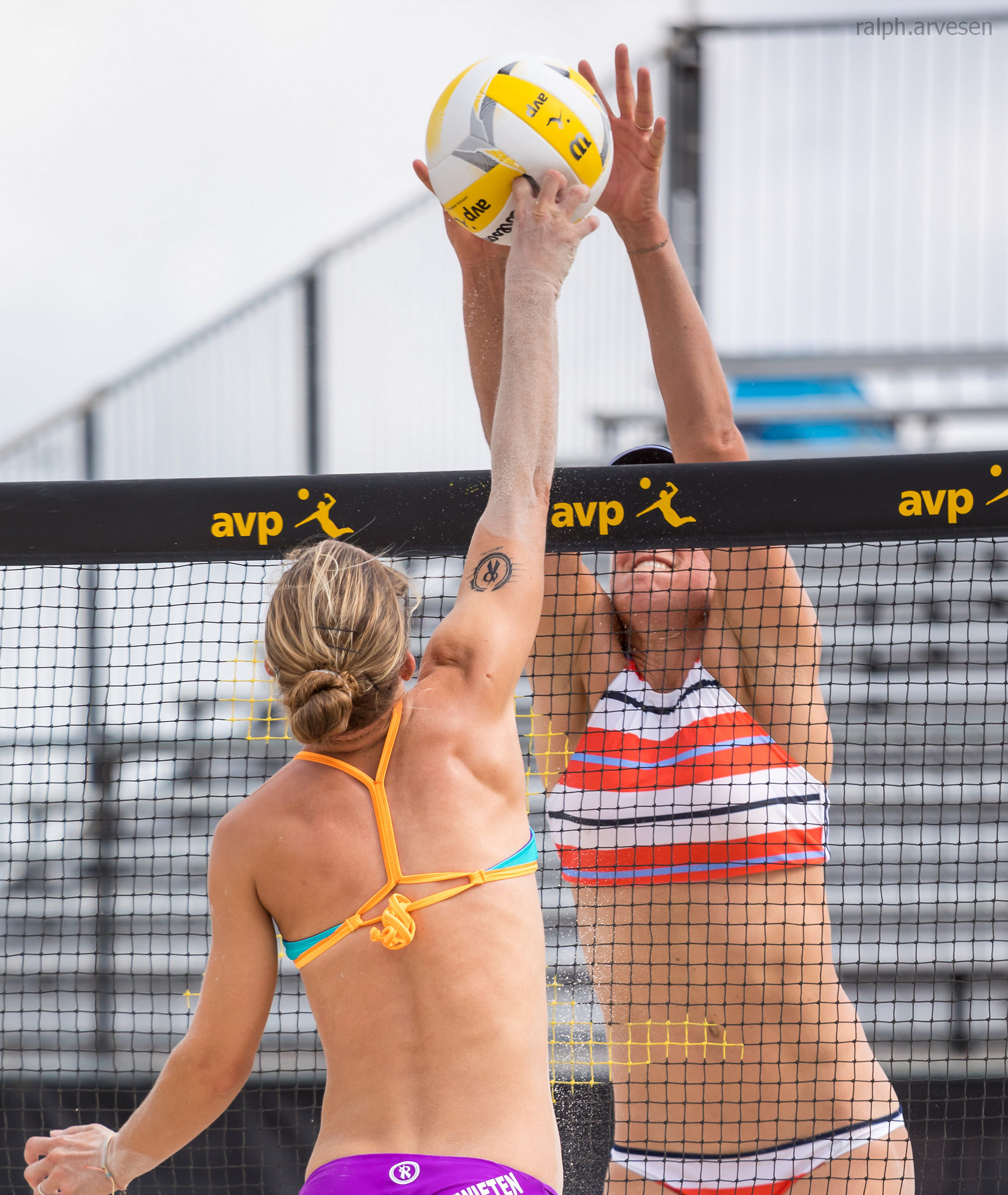
Open-handed tips/dinks are not allowed. Players may instead use their knuckles to attack the ball for a "pokey" shot.

The ball may touch any part of the body (except during the serve, when only the hand or arm may make contact), but must be hit, not caught or thrown. During a hit, a player may only make contact with the ball one time. When two players from the same team contact the ball simultaneously, it is counted as two hits, and either player may make the next contact. When two players from opposing teams contact the ball simultaneously over the net, in what is known as a joust, the team whose side the ball ends up on is entitled to another three contacts.

When receiving a ball overhand with fingers from a hit that is not hard driven, the ball must be contacted "cleanly". If a player receives the ball open-handed, the contact of each hand with the ball must be exactly simultaneous. In practice, this means that serves are never received open-handed. When receiving an opponent's hard-driven attack, a double contact (provided both contacts occur in a single action) and/or a slight lift of the ball is allowed. In particular, in defensive action of a hard driven ball, the ball can be held momentarily overhand with the fingers.

Attack-hits using an "open-handed tip or dink" directing the ball with the fingers are illegal, as are attack-hits using an overhand pass to direct the ball on a trajectory not perpendicular to the line of the shoulders (overhand passes which accidentally cross over the net are an exception). These differences between the rules of indoor volleyball and beach volleyball strongly affect tactics and techniques.

=== Block signals ===
Beach volleyball players use hand signals to indicate to their partners the type of block they either intend to make (if they are the designated blocker) or that they want their partner to make (if they are the designated defender). Block signals are important so that both the blocker and defender know which area of the court is their responsibility to cover. Block signals are made behind the back to hide them from the opposing team. They are usually given with both hands by the serving player's partner prior to the serve, with the left hand referring to the type of block that should be put up against the left-side attacker, and the right hand similarly referring to the right-side attacker. A player may also "wiggle" or "flash" one block signal to indicate which opponent to serve to.

Block signals may also be given during a rally while the opposing team is preparing their attack.

==== Common block signals ====
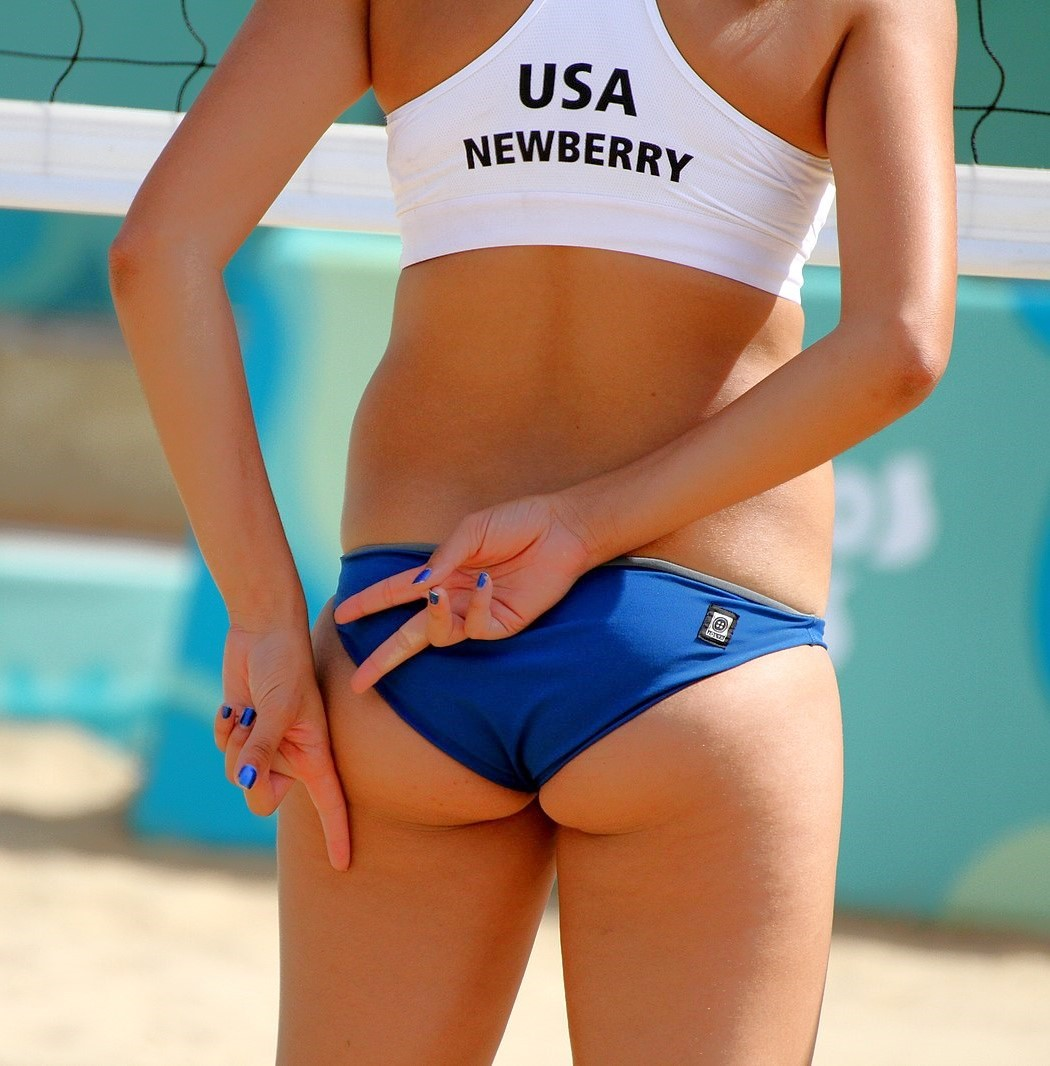
Beach volleyball player from the United States signaling to her teammate.

- Closed fist: No block should be attempted for the opponent on that side of the court. The blocker should thus "pull-off" the net and play backcourt defense with the defender.
- One finger: The blocker should block an opponent's "line" hit, or a ball hit hard towards the nearest sideline. The defender's responsibility is to dig all "angle" attacks, as well as run down any "line" shot that goes high over the block.
- Two fingers: The blocker should block an opponent's "angle" hit, or a ball hit hard diagonally across the court. The defender's responsibility is to dig all "line" attacks, as well as run down any "angle" shot that goes high over the block.
- Three fingers: The blocker pretends to block an opponent's "angle" hit, but dives into a "line" block at the last moment. At the same time, the defender pretends to cover the "line" attack, but moves to cover the "angle" attack at the last moment. With this setup, the team on defense is trying to bait the opponent into a hard "line" hit or a cut shot.
- Four fingers: The blocker pretends to block an opponent's "line" hit, but dives into an "angle" block at the last moment. At the same time, the defender pretends to cover the "angle" attack, but moves to cover the "line" attack at the last moment. With this setup, the team on defense is trying to bait the opponent into a hard "angle" hit or a high "line" shot.
- Open hand: The blocker should read the attack and block "ball", deciding how to block based upon the opposing team's set, and the hitter's approach and arm-swing technique. Similarly, the defender has free rein to read the attack and defend accordingly.
- Shaka: The blocker should spread their arms as wide as possible over the net for a "spread block", thus blocking all hard hits that travel low over the net. The defender's responsibility is to dig any shot that goes over or around the block.

Note: For some teams, closed fist and open hand signals have the opposite meaning of blocking. If the partner is showing the closed fist the blocker should block "ball" and open hand means that the blocker should "pull off" the net.

== Skills ==
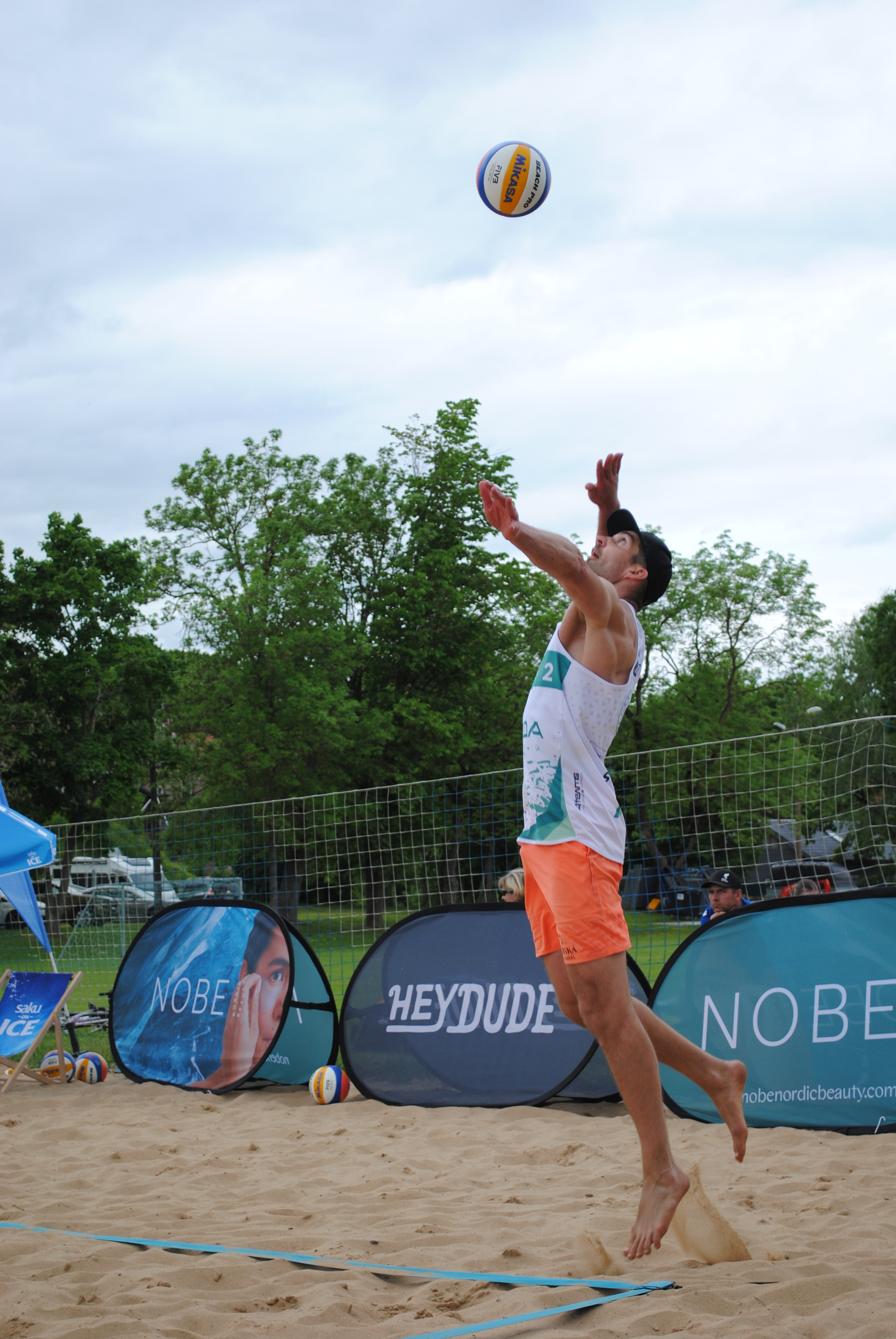
A player jump serving

There are several basic skills competitive players need to master: serving, passing, setting, attacking, blocking, and digging.

=== Serve ===
Serving is the act of putting the ball into play by striking it with the hand or arm from behind the rear court boundary. It can take the form of an underhand serve or an overhand serve, and examples include: float serve, jump-float serve, top-spin serve, jump serve, sky ball serve and reverse sky ball serve. As beach volleyball is usually played outdoors, the direction and speed of the wind and the position of the sun are considered when choosing which serve to use. Wind can significantly affect the trajectory of a serve and so players can employ different serving strategies to take advantage of the wind conditions. For example, players may choose a top-spin serve when serving into the wind, causing the ball to drop short in front of the passer. Players can also take advantage of the position of the sun. For example, a sky ball serve is especially effective at high noon, because the sun gets into the passer's eyes and can cause the passer to become disoriented.

Another factor the server considers is choosing which of the two opposing players to serve the ball to. Because of the three-contact rule, the player who receives the serve will likely also be the attacker, and serving strategies can thus target an opposing player's relative weakness in passing, setting or attacking.

Although the serve can be used as an offensive weapon, most rallies are won by the receiving team, as they have the first attack opportunity.

=== Pass ===
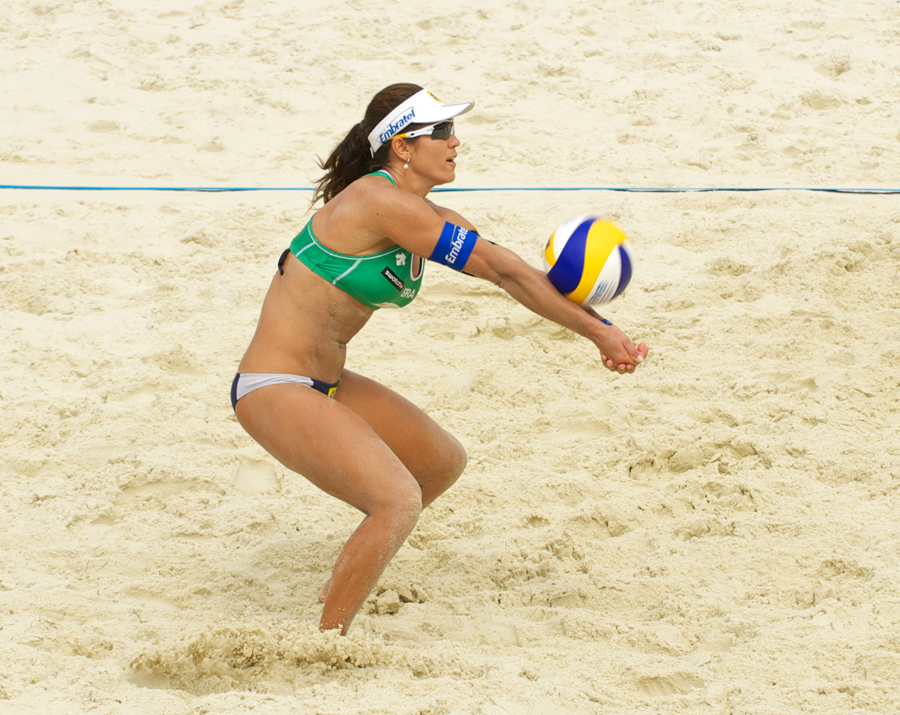
Brazil's Maria Antonelli making a forearm pass, also known as a bump

The pass is the first of a team's 3 allowed contacts. In indoor volleyball, passing involves two main techniques: forearm pass, or bump, where the ball touches the inside part of the joined forearms or platform, at waist line; and overhand pass, where it is handled with the fingertips, like a hand set, above the head. However, unlike indoors you may not double contact the first ball using overhand with fingers action on the beach. In practice, this means that bump pass is much more popular in beach volleyball; similarly, beach players rarely use an overhand passing motion as the first (except on a hard driven attack) or last of the three allowed team contacts. Digging is a similar skill to passing, but the term is not used to describe receiving the serve or a free ball, but rather refers to an attempt to prevent an opponent's attack hit from touching the court.

=== Set ===
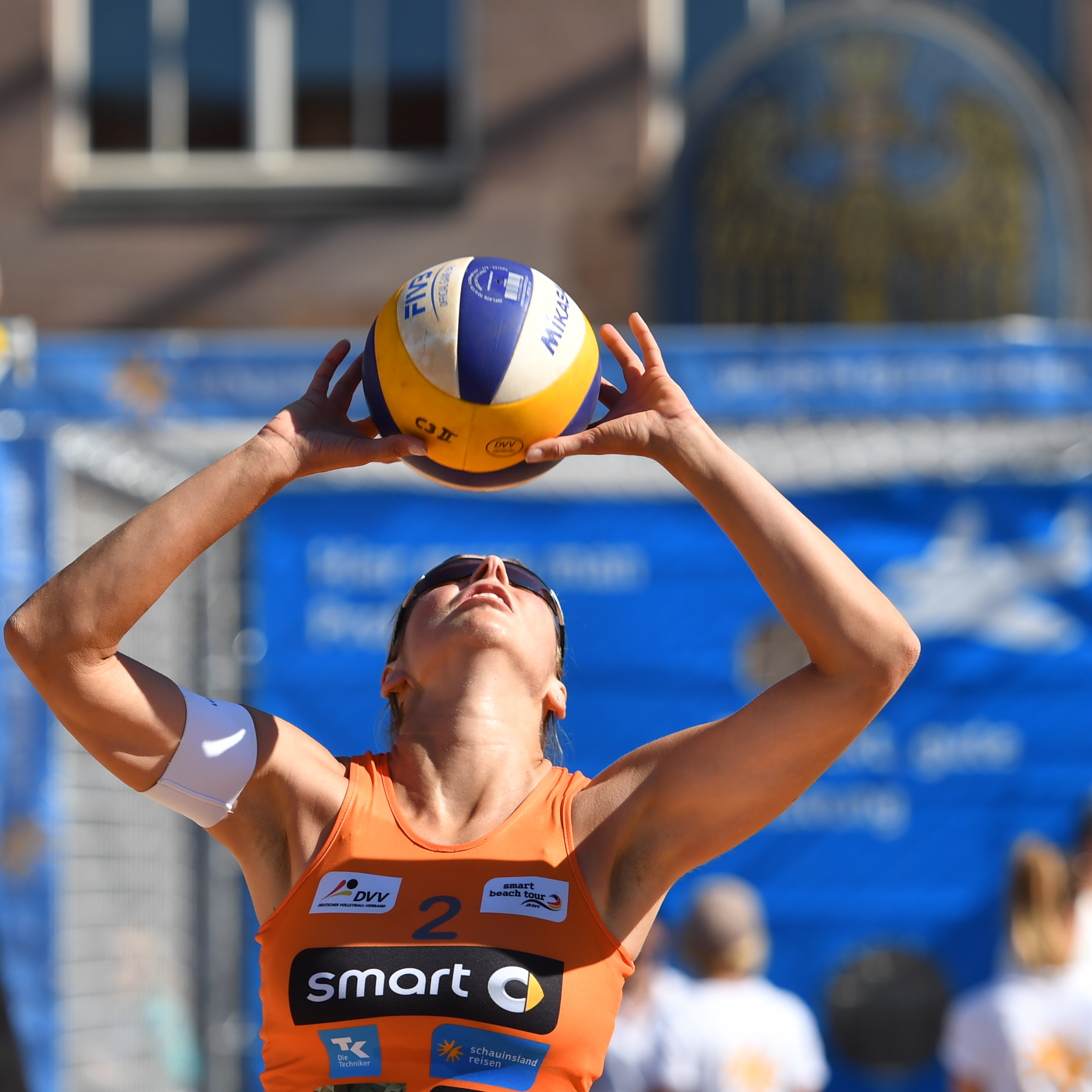
A player hand sets the ball

The set is the second team contact, and its purpose is to position the ball for an attack on the third hit. Similar to a pass, the ball can be set with either a forearm pass technique, known as a bump set, or an overhand pass technique, known as a hand set. Due to the environmental factors that make it harder to hand set a ball "cleanly", the bump set is more common in the beach game. When hand setting, the player's hands must contact the ball simultaneously. If a referee determines that a double-hit has occurred, the point will be given to the other team. Excessive spin after a ball has been set is often used as an indicator of a double contact fault, but causing a ball to spin while setting is not explicitly prohibited. After completing the contact, the setter typically turns their attention to the defense and communicates to their partner whether a blocker is up and which area of the court is open. The second contact can also be used to attack the ball, known as an "over-on-two" attack.

=== Attack ===
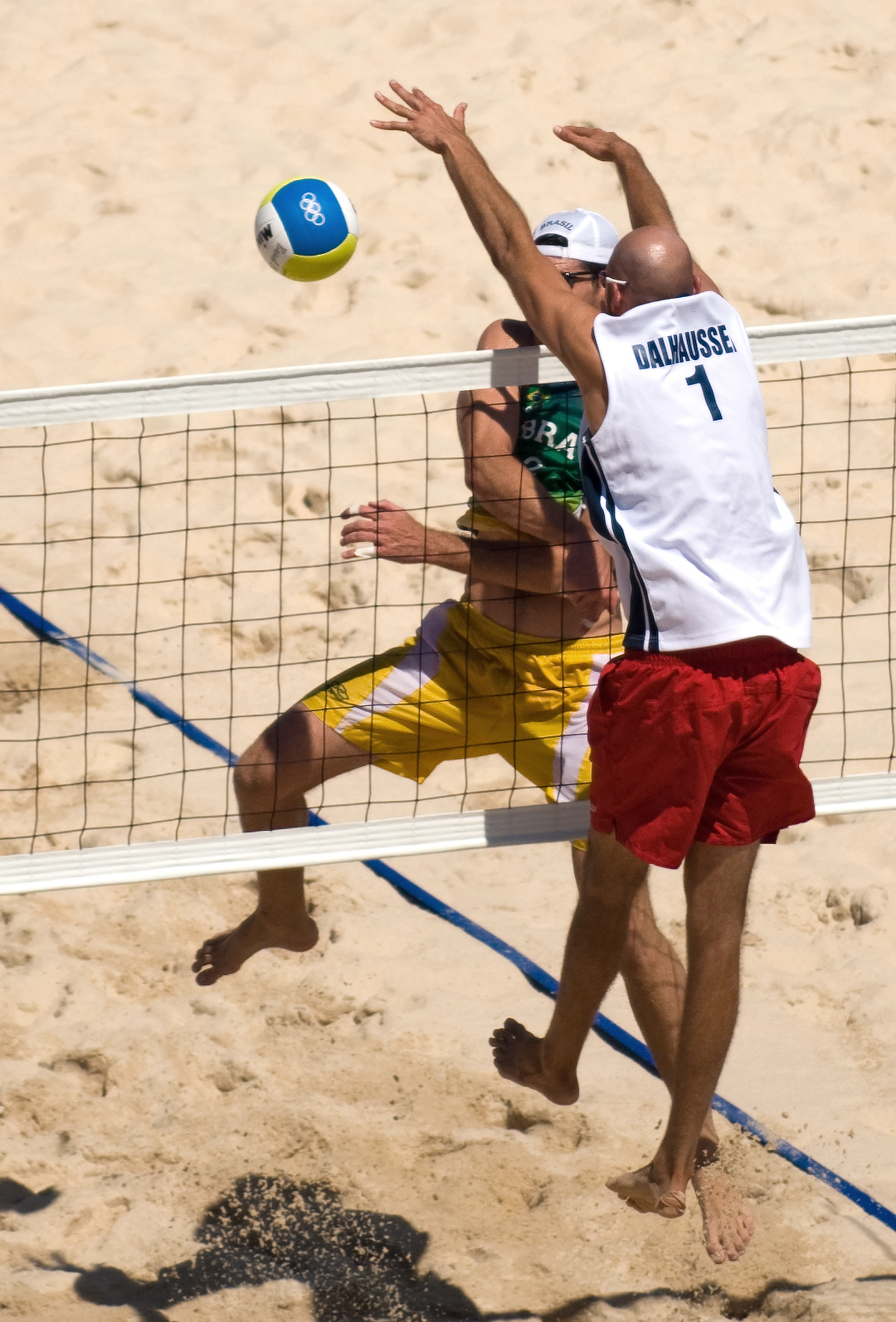
Phil Dalhausser attempts to block Fábio Luiz Magalhães's attack

A beach volleyball attack can be categorized as either a spike or a shot. A spike involves hitting the ball hard with one open hand on a downward trajectory from above the top of the net. A shot is a relatively soft attack used to place a ball into an open (undefended) area of the court. Unlike indoor volleyball, a wide variety of shots are utilized in beach volleyball due to the fewer defenders on court. Common shots used in beach volleyball include: roll shots, in which the attacker puts a lot of topspin on the ball so that it has an arcing trajectory that will go over the block then drop quickly; cut shots, in which the shot crosses the net at sharp angles; pokeys, in which the ball is contacted with the attacking player's knuckles; and dinks, in which the ball is directed very softly low over the net.

=== Block ===
A block can be used to: score a direct point by directing an attack back into the opponent's court; channel an attack to the defender by "taking away" part of the court; or slow down the ball so the defender has time to chase it down. At the competitive level, blockers will often reach across the net and "penetrate" the opposing team's side as much as possible to take away more hitting angles. Blockers may also attempt a shot block, where instead of maximum penetration across the net, the blocker reaches with their hands as high as possible to achieve maximum height above the net.

Players often decide against blocking (if the opposing team's pass and set are not in a good position to produce a spike attack) and instead opt to retreat and play defense. This skill is known as peeling, dropping or pulling off the net, and is almost exclusive to beach volleyball.

=== Training and skill development ===
Training in beach volleyball typically combines technical repetition of the core contacts (serve, pass, set, attack, block and dig) with practice tasks designed to resemble match play and its constraints, including wind and sun. A common structure is to start with a warm-up, progress to targeted skill work, and then integrate those skills into serve–receive, transition and modified-game situations so that players practice decision-making and partner coordination under realistic conditions.

The warm-up is commonly described as serving multiple functions: preparing the body for high-level performance, reducing injury risk and allowing athletes to adjust to current environmental conditions, with ball activities used to help players calibrate to wind effects. Coaching materials also describe progression by level. For beginners, emphasis is often placed on movement in sand, sustaining rallies and learning how environmental factors affect ball flight, sometimes using simple throw–catch or passing challenges to provide immediate feedback and encourage reading of the conditions. For intermediate and advanced athletes, practice may shift toward more specific skill objectives and higher-intensity sequences, while keeping injury-prevention and physical readiness as ongoing priorities.

Some coaching resources also advocate training methods that prioritize representative, game-like scenarios over isolated drills, such as small-sided games, modified court dimensions or target zones, and constraint-based rules that force players to adapt their solutions. These approaches are presented as a way to develop perception and decision-making (e.g., reading opponent cues), teamwork and communication, and to link physical preparation (agility, jumping, stability and endurance) with the movement demands of play; video review and other feedback tools may be used to support reflective practice and track adaptation over time.

== Governing bodies ==
The primary international governing body for beach volleyball is the Fédération Internationale de Volleyball (FIVB). The regional governing bodies are:

- Asia and Oceania – Asian Volleyball Confederation (AVC)
- Africa – Confédération Africaine de Volleyball (CAV)
- Europe – European Volleyball Confederation (CEV)
- North and Central America – North, Central America and Caribbean Volleyball Confederation (NORCECA)
- South America – Confederación Sudamericana de Voleibol (CSV)

In the United States, USA Volleyball is the governing body for beach volleyball, as well as indoor and sitting volleyball.

== Levels of competition ==
=== Professional ===
==== International ====
Until 2021 the FIVB Beach Volleyball World Tour was the international professional tour for both men and women organized by the Fédération Internationale de Volleyball (FIVB). In 2022 the FIVB Beach Volleyball World Tour was replaced by the Volleyball World Beach Pro Tour.

The inaugural tour of the FIVB Beach Volleyball World Tour was held in 1997, replacing the FIVB Beach Volleyball World Series that began in 1989 for men and 1992 for women. World Tour tournaments are ranked from 1 to 5 stars, with 5-star tournaments offering the most prize money. The 2018 World Tour has 47 international tournaments with a total prize purse of over US$7 million. Competing in the World Tour as well as other FIVB-recognized tournaments such as the Summer Olympics allows players to earn FIVB Ranking Points, with higher-star events being worth more points. The World Tour concludes with the World Tour Finals at the end of each season.

FIVB Beach Volleyball World Tour (as of 2018 season)
Event category	No. of teams in main draw (per gender)	Format	Prize money (per gender)
World Tour Finals	12	Pool play (1st phase); Single-elimination (2nd phase)	US$400,000
5-star	32	Pool play (1st phase); Single-elimination (2nd phase)	US$300,000
4-star	32	Pool play (1st phase); Single-elimination (2nd phase)	US$150,000
3-star	32	Pool play (1st phase); Single-elimination (2nd phase)	US$75,000
2-star	24	Pool play (1st phase); Single-elimination (2nd phase)	US$50,000
1-star	16	Pool play (1st phase); Single-elimination (2nd phase)	US$10,000

The Volleyball World Beach Pro Tour comprises three level of competition: Elite, Challenge and Futures.

The FIVB also organizes the FIVB Beach Volleyball World Championships every two years, held since 1997. The World Championships have a 48-team main draw and prize purse of US$500,000 per gender.

==== Regional ====
The five regional governing bodies also organize Continental Tours and Championships:

- Asian Volleyball Confederation (AVC) organizes the AVC Beach Volleyball Tour, culminating with the Asian Beach Volleyball Championships (since 2002).
- African Volleyball Confederation (CAVB) organizes the African Beach Volleyball Championships.
- European Volleyball Confederation (CEV) organizes the European Beach Volleyball Tour (since 1993), which consists of Satellite and Masters events, culminating with the European Beach Volleyball Championships. From the 2018 season onwards, the Satellite and Masters events have been merged into the FIVB World Tour, but are still organized by the CEV.
- North, Central America and Caribbean Volleyball Confederation (NORCECA) organizes the NORCECA Beach Volleyball Circuit (since 2007).
- Confederación Sudamericana de Voleibol (CSV) organizes the South American Beach Volleyball Circuit (since 2005).

Players can only participate in the Continental Tour that their national federation is a member of. In addition to prize money, Continental Tour events award players with FIVB ranking points and their national federations with National Federation ranking points. The latter determines how many teams a national federation can send to the World Championships and the Summer Olympics.

==== National ====
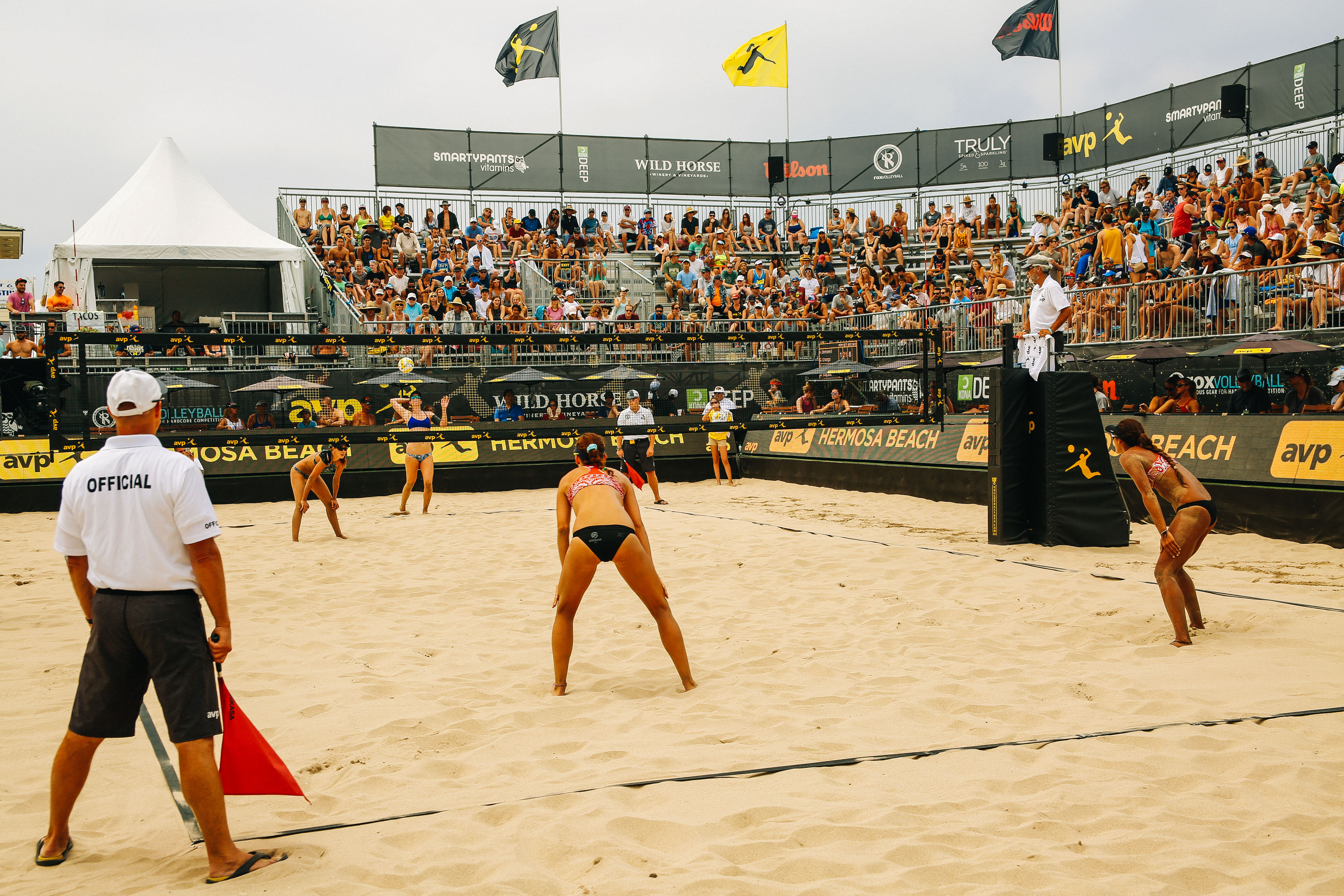
A women's match at the 2017 Hermosa Beach Open, one of the tournaments in the AVP tour.

Some countries also have domestic professional tours, but only FIVB-approved national tours can award FIVB ranking points. As of 2017, there are 21 FIVB-approved national tours.

In the United States, the Association of Volleyball Professionals (AVP) is the main domestic professional tour, organizing tournaments annually such as the Manhattan Beach Open. The AVP tour is not FIVB-approved and has had conflicts with the FIVB in the 1980s and 1990s over regulations and sponsorship, leading to an initial boycott of FIVB events by the top American players.

In Germany, the German Beach Tour, formerly known as the Techniker Beach Tour, is the top domestic tour and is FIVB-approved. Each season ends with the German Beach Volleyball Championships.

In Brazil, the FIVB-approved Brazilian Beach Volleyball Circuit (pt:Circuito Brasileiro de Voleibol de Praia) is the main national tour. It has been organized by the Brazilian Volleyball Confederation since 1991. The tour consists of the main Open Circuit and a Challenger Circuit. Each season concludes with the Superpraia championship.

=== Multi-sport events ===
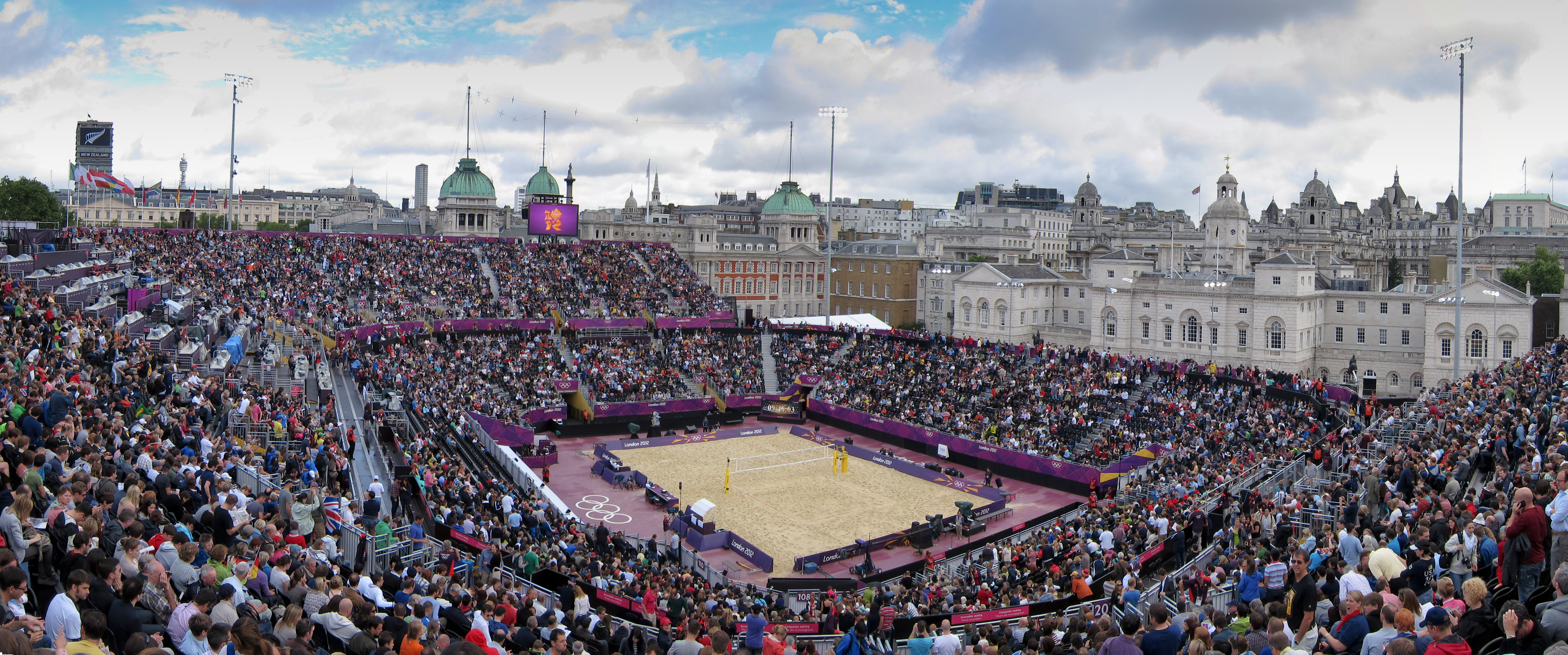
Horse Guards Parade beach volleyball stadium at the 2012 Summer Olympics in London

Men and women's beach volleyball has been contested in the Summer Olympics since 1996. It is also contested in other international multi-sport events, including the Commonwealth Games (since 2018), Pan American Games (since 1999), Central American and Caribbean Games (since 1998), Asian Games (since 1998), Pacific Games (since 1999), African Games (since 2011), and Asian Beach Games (since 2008).

=== College ===
==== United States ====
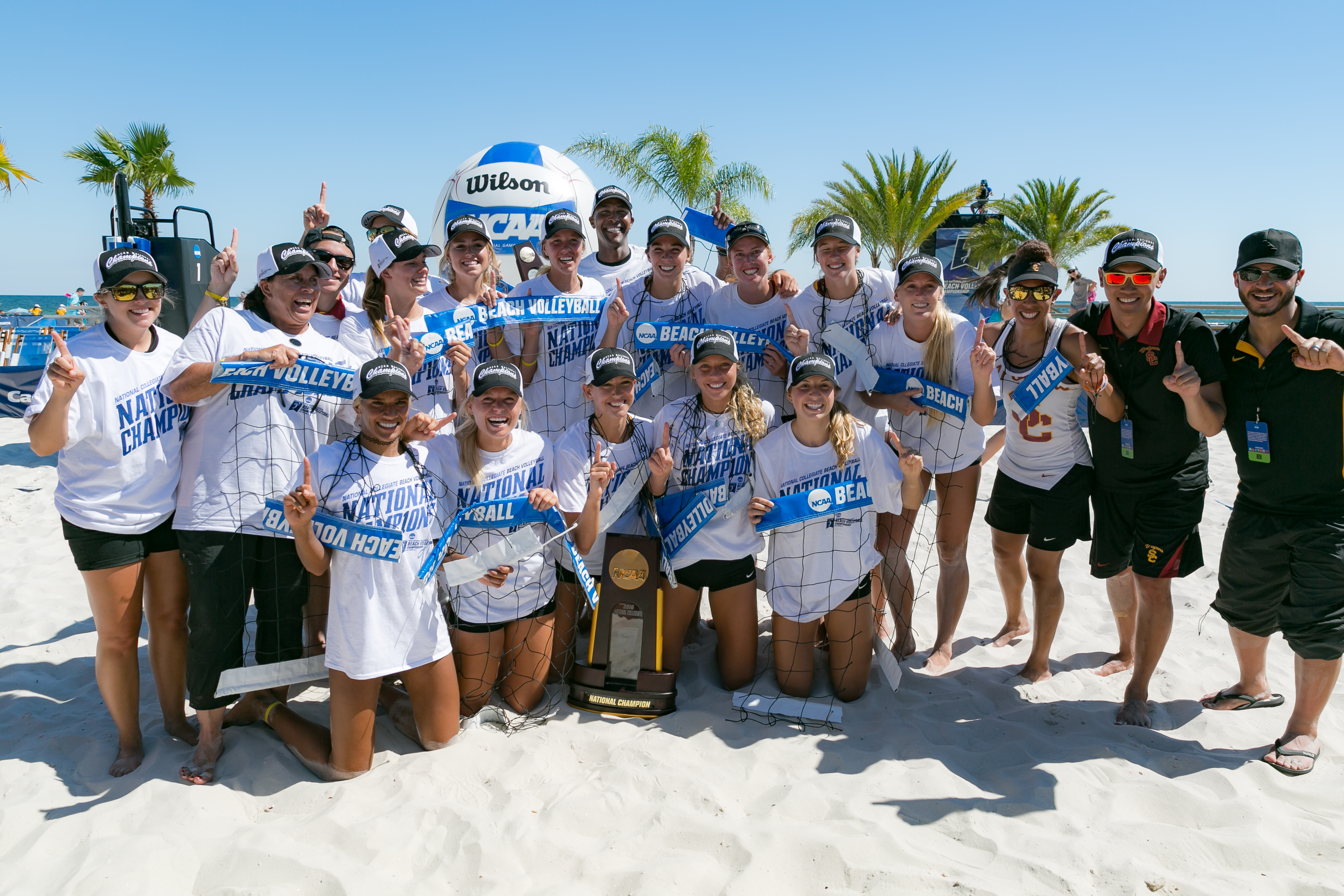
The USC Trojans women's beach volleyball team poses with the National Championship trophy after winning the inaugural 2016 NCAA Beach Volleyball Championship.

In the 2010–2011 academic year, the National Collegiate Athletic Association (NCAA) began sponsoring women's beach volleyball, then called "sand volleyball", as an "emerging sport". Initially, it was sponsored only for Division II, with Division I added the following academic year. NCAA competition follows standard beach volleyball rules, with competitions involving five doubles-teams from each participating school. For a sport to classify as a championship, at least 40 schools must sponsor it. In 2015, sixty schools had teams, allowing it to become NCAA's 90th Championship sport. Beach volleyball became a fully sanctioned NCAA championship sport in the 2015–2016 school year, following votes by leaders of all three NCAA divisions to launch a single all-divisions national championship.

In 2019, the National Association of Intercollegiate Athletics (NAIA) approved women's collegiate beach volleyball as an "emerging sport" with 16 NAIA institutions fielding teams in the 2019–2020 school year.

==== Philippines ====
Beach volleyball is a men's and women's championship sport in the National Collegiate Athletic Association (NCAA) and the University Athletic Association of the Philippines (UAAP). In the NCAA, it is contested at both the high school and college level.

==== Europe ====
The European Universities Beach Volleyball Championships are held annually as part of the European Universities Championships.

=== Junior ===
The FIVB organizes the annual U19 and U21 World Championships. World Championships for the U17 and U23 age-groups were previously held as well. Teams are awarded FIVB ranking points at these Championships, but not prize money. Instead, the winning U19 teams get a direct main draw entry into the next U21 World Championships, while the winning U21 teams get a direct main draw entry into a World Tour 4 or 5-star event of their choice.

Beach volleyball is also contested at the Youth Olympic Games (since 2014).

== Uniform ==
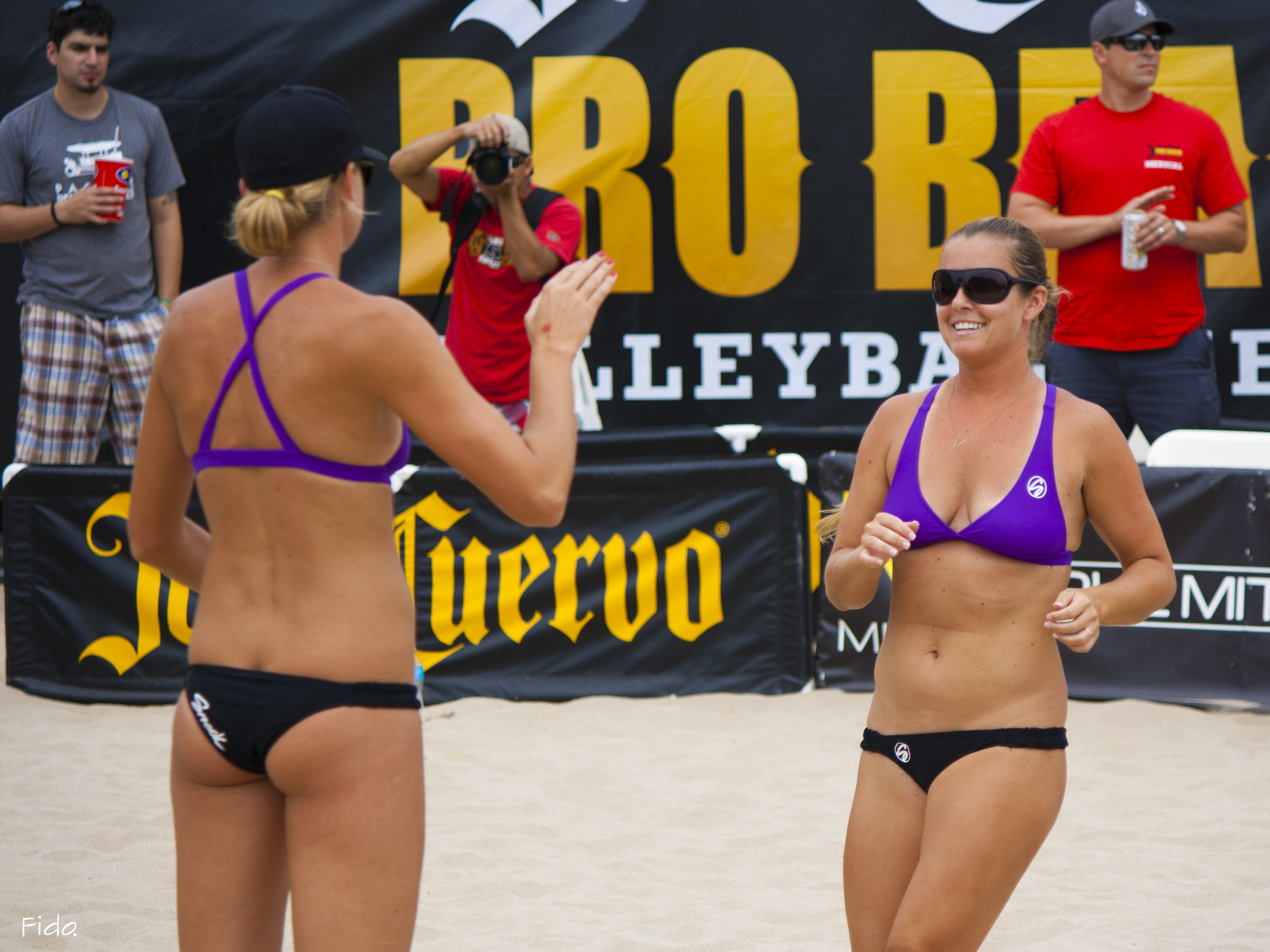
US women's team has cited several advantages to bikini uniforms, such as comfort while playing on sand during hot weather. Photo shows US national team players (Jennifer Fopma (left) and Brooke Sweat) in their uniforms.

In 1999, the FIVB standardized beach volleyball uniforms, with the swimsuit becoming the required uniform for both men and women. Women were required to wear two-piece bikinis, while men were required to wear shorts that were no longer than 20 cm (7.9 in) above the knees. This drew the ire of some athletes.

According to current FIVB rules, female beach volleyball players have the option of playing in shorts or a one-piece swimsuit. Most players, however, prefer the two-piece bikini. Competitors such as Natalie Cook and Holly McPeak have confirmed the FIVB's claims that the uniforms are practical for a sport played on sand during the heat of summer, with McPeak saying that the two-piece is more comfortable and allows for a greater range of motion while the one-piece has the further problem of trapping sand. British Olympian Denise Johns claimed that the regulation uniform is intended to be "sexy" and to draw attention. Other players have argued that the bikini is tied to the sport's "beach culture".

During the 2004 Summer Olympic Games, a study was conducted on the camera angles during the beach volleyball games. 20% of the camera angles were focused on the chest area and 17% of the angles were focused on the buttock area. The study concludes that this implies the look of the players is having a greater impact on fans than their actual athleticism.

Some conservative cultures have expressed religious objections to the swimsuit as a uniform. At the 2007 South Pacific Games, rules were adjusted to require less revealing shorts and cropped sports tops. At the 2006 Asian Games, only one Muslim country fielded a team in the women's competition, amid concerns the uniform was inappropriate.

In early 2012, the FIVB announced it would allow shorts (maximum length 3 cm (1.2 in) above the knee) and sleeved tops at the London 2012 Olympics. The federation spokesman said that "many of these countries have religious and cultural requirements so the uniform needed to be more flexible". In fact, the weather was so cold for the evening games at London 2012 that the players sometimes had to wear shirts and leggings.

== Lifestyle and culture ==
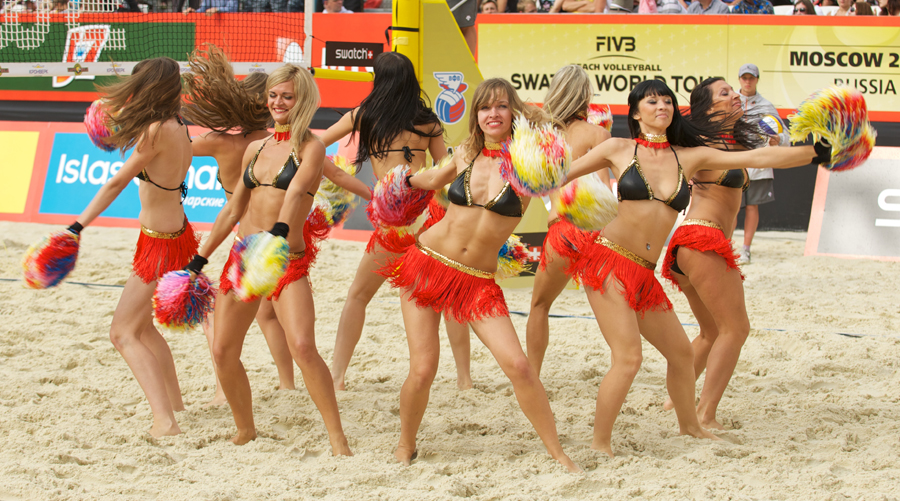
Dancers during a match at the 2012 FIVB Moscow Grand Slam

Beach volleyball culture includes the people, language, fashion, and life surrounding the sport of modern beach volleyball. With its origins in Hawaii and California, beach volleyball is strongly associated with a casual, beach-centric lifestyle. As it developed nearly in parallel with modern surfing, beach volleyball culture shares some similarities with surf culture. The beach bum archetype is one such example. Professional beach volleyball matches often have a "party atmosphere", with loud music, announcers and dancers in between points and during time-outs.

Fashion often extends from the clothing worn during play, like the bikini or boardshorts. And much like surfers, beach volleyball players are at the mercy of the weather; patterns of play often develop based on weather conditions like sun and wind.

Beyond professional competition, beach volleyball has developed a recreational travel culture, with casual and amateur players participating in beach volleyball camps and training holidays at coastal destinations worldwide. These programs typically combine coaching, skill development, and social activities, allowing players to improve their game while experiencing the sport in different international locations.

=== Naturist volleyball ===
Naturists were early adopters of the game. Records of regular games in clubs can be found as early as the 1920s. Given the outdoor nature of naturism, a beach version of volleyball was naturally adopted. By the 1960s, a volleyball court could be found in almost all naturist clubs. A large (over 70 teams) nude volleyball tournament has been held each fall since 1971 at White Thorn Lodge in western Pennsylvania, and several smaller tournaments occur each year throughout North America.

== Injuries ==
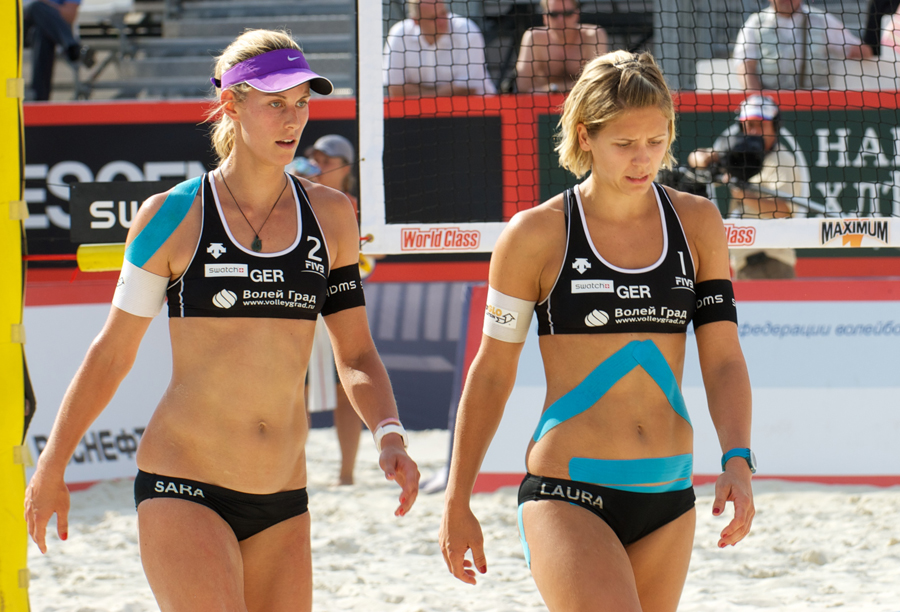
Germany's Sara Goller (left) and Laura Ludwig with blue kinesio tape.

The most common injuries in beach volleyball are knee, ankle, shoulder and finger injuries. Pain due to overuse of the knee, lower back, and especially shoulder is common as well, but is less prevalent than in indoor volleyball due to the soft landing surface. Acute lost-time injuries are also relatively rare in beach volleyball compared to other team sports. Many players use kinesiology tape. Interest in this tape has surged after American beach volleyball player and three-time Olympic gold medalist Kerri Walsh wore it at the 2008 Beijing Olympics.

== Variants ==
=== 4x4 beach volleyball ===
4x4 beach volleyball is a variant of the regular two-man beach game that is popular in the United States and Brazil. FIVB-sanctioned matches are best of 3 sets played to 21 points (15 points in a third set tie-break), with four starting players and up to two substitutes in a team. 4x4 is contested at the World Beach Games.

=== Snow volleyball ===
Snow volleyball is a winter sport played by two teams on a snow court divided by a net. Originating as a variant of beach volleyball, the rules of snow volleyball are similar to the beach game, with the main differences being the playing surface, the scoring system and the number of players. As in the beach version, matches were originally best of 3 sets played to 21 points, with two players in a team. In December 2018, the FIVB approved new rules for snow volleyball which changed the scoring system to a best of 3 sets played to 15 points, and the number of players to three starters and one substitute in a team. Another difference is that unlike beach volleyball, a touch off block does not count as one of the three allowed touches, and any player may make the subsequent touch after the block.

== See also ==
- Beach handball
- Beach volleyball at the Summer Olympics
- List of American beach volleyball players
