= Dennis Hare =

Californian artist

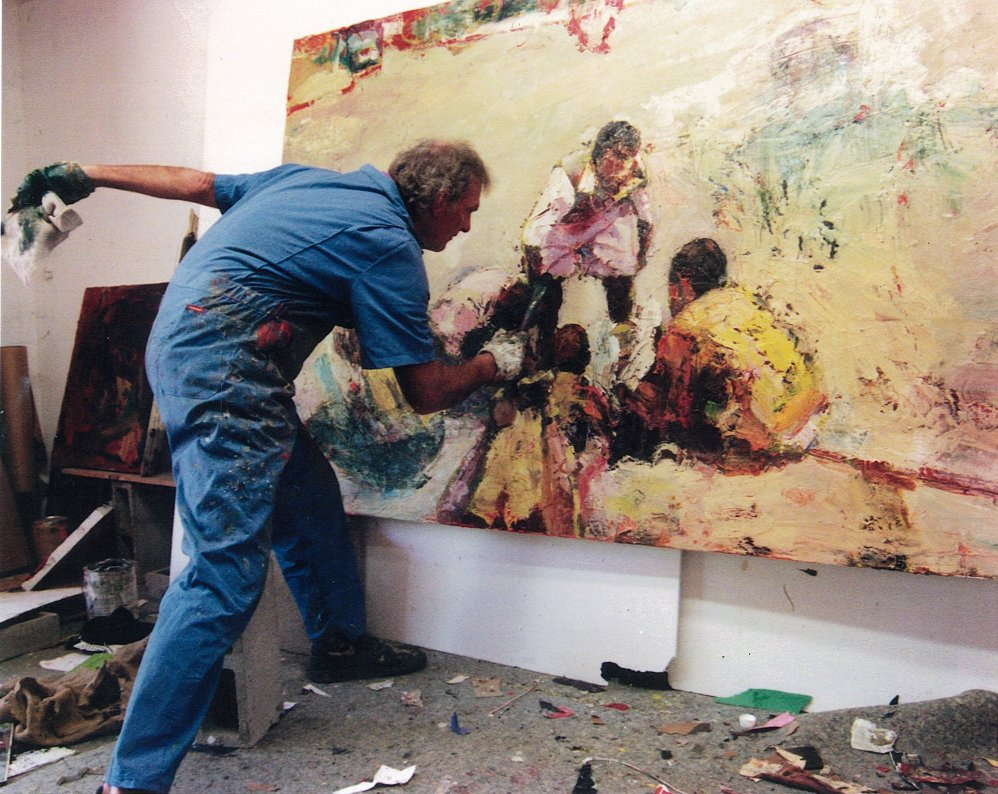
- Dennis Hare at work in his studio
- Born: 1946 (age 79–80); Glendale, California
- Occupation: Artist
- Known for: Figurative and abstract art

Dennis Hare (August 29, 1946 – March 10, 2024) was a Californian artist, known mainly for his figurative work, and a former beach volleyball player and athlete. Hare's career spans 35 years. Today he is known as both a figurative and abstract assemblage artist with over 55 solo shows. He was also a member of the Beach Volleyball Hall of Fame. Hare wrote the first book on the subject of beach volleyball, The Art of Beach Volleyball.

== Early life ==
Hare was born in Glendale, California in 1946. His father Fred was a sports writer and his mother Arlene an interior designer. In 1964, as a high school senior, he was selected to the All-Southern California Basketball Team. Hare was introduced to volleyball while at San Diego State University where he graduated in 1969. In 1971, after returning from the service where he was a member of the All Armed Forces Volleyball Team, Hare dedicated himself to the sport of doubles beach volleyball. His love of the sport prompted him to write the first book on the subject: The Art of Beach Volleyball.

== Education ==
Hare attended Yucaipa High School and then went on to San Bernardino Valley College. He later transferred to San Diego State University to play baseball, graduating in 1969 with a first degree in physical education.

== Sports career ==
Hare began his career as an athlete. In high school he played basketball and baseball for the California Interscholastic Federation. During the 1964 season he won an All-California Interscholastic Federation First Team award and an All-American Honorable Mention. He was also named the most valuable basketball player for the Desert Valley League that same year. He continued playing both sports into college.

While at San Diego State University Hare started playing volleyball and later moved into beach volleyball. His beach volleyball career lasted between 1968 and 1978. In 1975 Hare and partner, Fred Zuelich, won the first ever Volleyball World Championship held in at the then San Diego Sports Arena. He teamed up with Jim Menges to win the Hermosa Beach Open in 1976. Hare entered and won several other notable tournaments including winning, with his partner, Fred Zuelich, the first commercially-sponsored event in 1974, and the first indoor championship, also in that year. He also won three Senior Olympic tournaments, amassing a total of eight career wins. In 2008 he was inducted into the California Beach Volleyball Association Hall of Fame.

== Artistic career ==
Hare’s artistic career started in 1979 when he first began to paint in watercolors, soon becoming a member of the National Watercolor Society. It was while doing illustrations for his book on beach volleyball that his interest in art developed. By 1986 Hare was exclusively working in oils. "Hare's early figurative work catapulted him to success in the 1980s". Hare is a self-taught artist, having visited museums and studied the work of classic talents to develop his own skill.

Hare works mainly in oil but uses a variety of material in his pieces, especially discarded items, junk and especially objects that show signs of weathering.

Hare's art work is on display at his home studio. His pieces appeared in private galleries such as the Westbrook Galleries, Art Cube, the Crocker Art Museum, and the Donna Seager Gallery in Laguna Beach, San Rafael and Carmel. He is represented by galleries in New York, San Francisco and Laguna Beach as well as in other parts of the United States. His work was featured at the Charles Campbell Gallery (later the Campbell Thiebaud Gallery), San Francisco, for over a decade.

In 1993 the Salander O'Reilly Gallery featured Hare in the show, Four West Coast Painters: Nathan Oliveira, David Park, Dennis Hare and Larry Cohen. In 1995 Hare was included in the Campbell -Thiebaud Gallery show, The Figure: Paintings, Drawings, and Sculpture, Balthus, Elmer Bischoff, Joan Brown, de Kooning, De Staebler, Diebenkorn, Chuck Eckart, Dennis Hare and Manuel Neri. Hare was also represented by The Allan Stone Gallery in New York and the Hackett-Freedman Gallery, San Francisco.

Hare gave frequent lectures and workshops on self-expression and the artist within.

Hare resided in Mentone, California in a hacienda-type bungalow which he redesigned. This hosts his art studio with an extensive collection of his work, which was featured by the local YMCA in its 2013 Holiday Home Tour. In 2013 he also donated art to the Family Service Association of Redlands towards their fundraising efforts.
