= Own the Podium =

Canadian not-for-profit sporting organisation

- Founded: 2004
- CEO: Anne Merklinger
- Sponsor: Sport Canada, Canadian Olympic Committee, Canadian Paralympic Committee, VANOC

Official website
- ownthepodium.org
- (Canada)

Own the Podium (French: À nous le podium) is a Canadian not-for-profit organization. Originally created as Own the Podium - 2010 to prepare Canadian athletes to reach medal finishes at the 2010 Olympic Winter Games, the program has since expanded to include a division for summer sports as well, known as Road to Excellence. As of 2012 the program's CEO is Anne Merklinger following the resignation of Alex Baumann for health reasons.

== History ==
After failing to win a gold medal in the first two Olympic Games hosted in Canada (the 1976 Summer Olympics in Montreal and the 1988 Winter Olympics in Calgary)—becoming the only country to have hosted multiple Olympic Games without winning a gold medal at home—the Canadian Olympic Committee pledged to make Canada the top medal winning nation at 2010 when the country hosted the Olympic Games for the third time. The COC's program was inspired by the USOC, which had previously regarded the Winter Olympics as the "Forgotten Games", but then changed strategies and improved sponsorship of winter sports, and this led the US to great medal successes at the 2002 Salt Lake City Olympics.

The determination to boost Canada's performance came just months after Canada's 13 winter national sport federations, the Canadian Olympic Committee (COC), Sport Canada, the Calgary Olympic Development Association (CODA), the Canadian Paralympic Committee (CPC), and the Vancouver Organizing Committee for the 2010 Olympic and Paralympic Winter Games (VANOC) met in Calgary in February 2004 to discuss their goals for the 2010 Games.

Based on the principles and framework developed at the meeting, the COC contracted an independent consultant to analyze the sport projections, provide recommendations on changes and resources required, and determine if the goals were achievable. Cathy Priestner Allinger was selected to perform this study, which recruited experts in sport and sport systems. The final report was submitted to the partners later that year. A subcommittee called the Own the Podium Steering Committee was then created to manage the implementation of the report's recommendations.

A 2006 survey indicated that almost 3 out of 4 Canadians approved of the goals set in the program, and that nearly 70% of them say it is important for Canada to be a top medal finisher in 2010.

The 13 winter national sport federations included:

- Alpine Canada
- Biathlon Canada
- Bobsleigh Canada Skeleton
- Canadian Curling Association
- Canadian Freestyle Ski Association
- Cross Country Canada
- Canadian Luge Association
- Canadian Snowboard Federation
- Hockey Canada
- Nordic Combined Ski Canada
- Ski Jumping Canada
- Skate Canada
- Speed Skating Canada

In 2006, the Canadian government announced the creation of Podium Canada, an umbrella body for the Own the Podium - 2010 (OTP) and Road to Excellence (RTE) sport programs. While OTP focuses on winter sports, RTE's vision and strategy is for Canadian teams to improve their performance at the Olympic and Paralympic Summer Games in 2008 and 2012.

== Program ==
Even before its inception, the program has been a collaborative project supported by sport federations and their funding partners. This program marks the first time Canada's winter sport organizations have come together with their sport partners to map out a comprehensive plan. The sporting system in Canada has been marked by fragmented funding which would be replaced by a high performance body to distribute funds to winter sports based on annual sport reviews and an accountability model. This body would be governed by a board made up of funding partners and winter sport federations representatives.

The report analyzed Canada's potential to be the top medal winner at 2010, which concluded that Canada in fact has the potential to reach its goal given a new approach to sport delivery. The report called for support by the federal government and sport leaders in Canada as well as a $21-million annual increase in funding for winter sports over the next five years, spending $118 million. The report found that Canada has the talent in certain sport disciplines to increase the number of potential medallists to 211 for 2010. To achieve the goal of approximately 35 medals, the projected first-place finish in 2010, a 50% success rate for the potential medallists would be necessary. The program also aims to improve Canada's success rate through increased preparation, technology, research and development, and human performance research.

The report predicted that without implementation of the recommended measures, Canada could only be expected to win 17 medals in 2006 and 16 medals in 2010.

== Partnerships ==
The program relies on support and commitment from government, corporate, sport and performance partners. Supports include direct funding, investment, sport expertise and service delivery.

== Own the Podium - 2010 ==
The goal for OTP was to prepare Canada to become the top winter sporting nation in the world by 2010 — when Canada would host the Winter Olympics. This achievement would be measured by whether Canada becomes the top medal-winning nation at the 2010 Olympic Winter Games in Vancouver and Whistler, and places in the top three at the 2010 Paralympic Winter Games. To achieve the goals of 2010, the focus of the program was to provide additional resources and high performance programming to Canadian athletes, coaches and support personnel.

The first three years of the program focused on the development of sport organizations; coaches and leaders; and programs for the athletes.

The remaining two seasons will focus on training at the 2010 venues and competing in international events. This will familiarize athletes and coaches with the sporting venues and prepare them for top-level competition conditions.

=== Results before 2010 ===
Since the launch of the program, the 2006 Winter Olympic Games has been the first testing ground of the program's effectiveness. The program has been credited for the success of Canada at the 2006 Games despite its short existence. The COC had set a goal of 25 medals and a top three medal standing for Canada in the 2006 Games, in part considering the increased funding and resources as a result of the program. By the end of the 2006 Games, Canadian athletes achieved the country's best ever medal performance in the Winter Games by winning 24 medals, and Canada placed third in terms of total medals.

The program has been credited for the success of Canadian winter athletes in the 2007–2008 season of World Cup and World Championship competitions. Forty-nine more World Cup event medals were won than in the previous 2006–2007 season. Together with medals won in Paralympic sports, Canada led in medals among all contending nations.

== Results at the 2010 Games ==
Although the program did not achieve its stated goal of winning the most total medals in the Games, Canada did succeed in breaking the record for most gold medals won in any Winter Olympics.

=== Winter Olympics ===
By February 22, after the first week of the 2010 Games, the COC admitted that it would be impossible for Canada to finish first in total medals. Expected Canadian medal favourites failed to reach the podium, particularly in Alpine skiing and speed skating (especially men's long track and short track). At the same time, the USA was the runaway leader in total medals, achieving many of their medals in Alpine skiing. (The United States went on to win 37 total medals, the most of any country at a single Winter Olympics.) However, over the next six days, Canada broke a series of gold medals records at a single Winter Olympics.

On February 27, the second to last day of these Games, the eleventh gold medal competition awarded to a member of the Canadian delegation surpassed the former record of ten gold medals awarded to any host country's team at the Winter Olympics. (previous record of 10 was set by both Norway in 1994 and the United States in 2002.) Canada became the first host nation to finish on top of the gold medal count since Norway in 1952. That was also a record three gold medals from the Winter Games on Day 16 for Canada. The next day, Sidney Crosby propelled Canada to its 14th gold medal of the games with the game winning overtime goal in the men's ice hockey gold medal game, surpassing the previous record of 13 set by the former Soviet Union in 1976 and Norway in 2002.

Although Canada finished these Olympics third in total medals, behind the United States and Germany, their 26 total medals was the most a host country had won at a Winter Olympics, since the United States had 34 in 2002.

Medallists have credited the program for their successes, while some have criticized the program for putting too much pressure on the athletes.

=== Winter Paralympics ===
Canadian Paralympic athletes achieved the best record ever for Canada at the Paralympics. Canada ended the Games with 19 total medals, 10 of them gold, ending at 3rd in total medals ranking, and 3rd in gold medal ranking. This met the performance level set by the Canadian Paralympic Committee, of ending third in total medal count.

== Road to Excellence ==
Created in 2006, Road to Excellence (RTE) is designed to provide technical support and assistance to targeted athletes for future Olympic and Paralympic Games. The goal for RTE was for Canada to place top 12 at the 2012 Summer Olympics and top five at the 2012 Summer Paralympics in London. RTE failed to meet both goals as Canada placed 27th in 2012 Summer Olympics and 20th in 2012 Summer Paralympics.

== Controversy ==
The program has gained media spotlight since the beginning of the 2010 Games, having been scrutinized during the Games of its effectiveness and whether Canadian athletes were on track to meet the program's goals.

== See also ==
- Project 119 (China)
