= Sports in Canada =

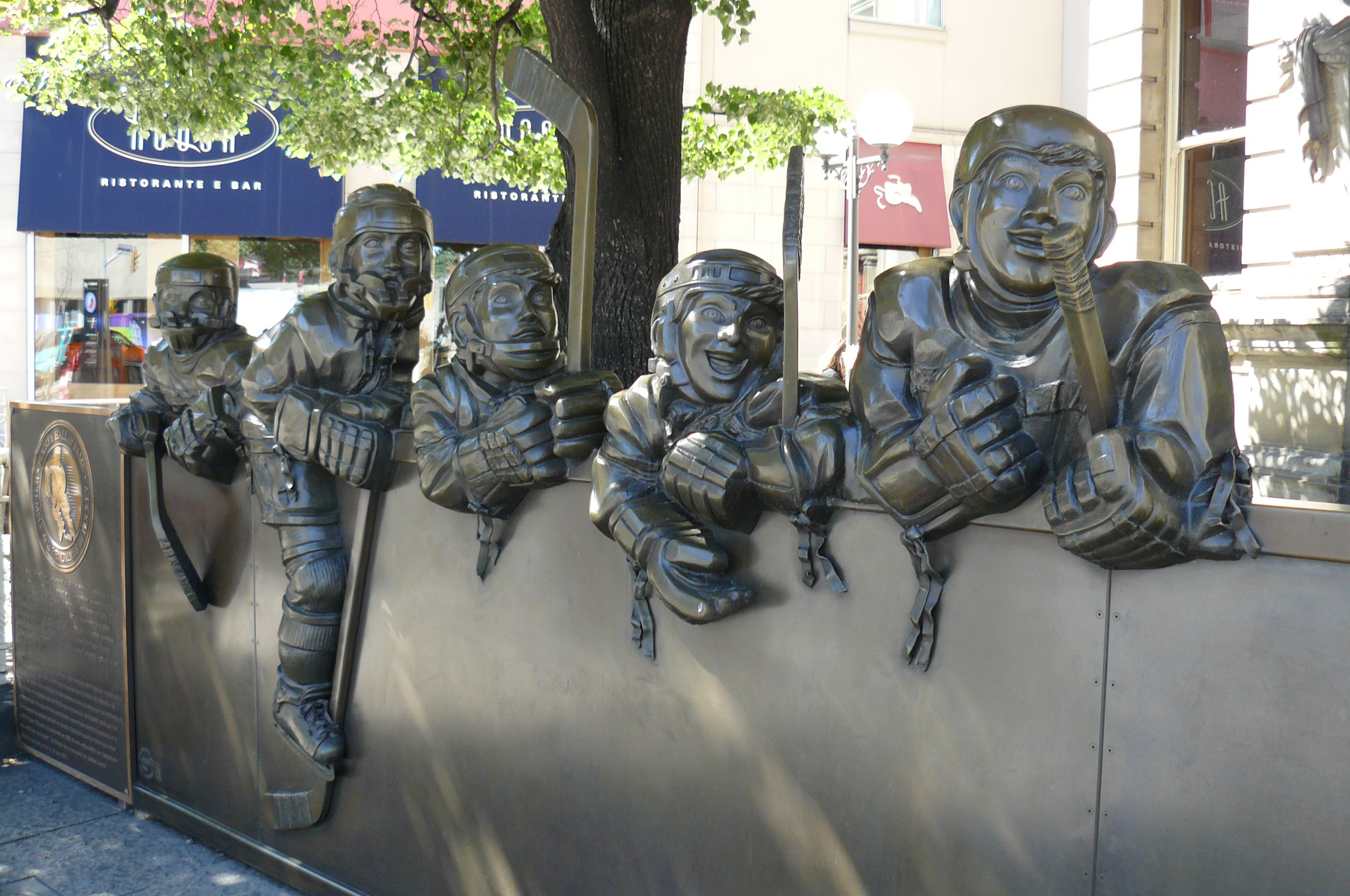
"Our Game" sculpture by Canadian artist Edie Parker outside the Hockey Hall of Fame.

Sports in Canada consist of a wide variety of games. The roots of organized sports in Canada date back to the 1770s. Canada's official national sports are ice hockey and lacrosse. Other major professional games include curling, basketball, baseball, soccer, and football. Great achievements in Canadian sports are recognized by numerous "Halls of Fame" and museums, such as Canada's Sports Hall of Fame.

Canada shares several major professional sports leagues with the United States. Canadian teams in these leagues include seven franchises in the National Hockey League, as well as three Major League Soccer teams and one team in each of Major League Baseball and the National Basketball Association. Other popular professional competitions include the Canadian Football League, National Lacrosse League, the Canadian Premier League, and the various curling tournaments hosted by Curling Canada. Canadians identified hockey as their preferred sport for viewing, followed by soccer and then basketball.

Swimming was the most common, reported sport by over one-third (35 percent) of Canadians in 2023. This was closely followed by cycling (33 percent) and running (27 percent). The popularity of specific sports varies across racialized groups; in general, the Canadian-born population was more likely to have participated in winter sports such as ice hockey (the most popular young adult team sport), skating, skiing and snowboarding, compared with immigrants, who were more likely to have played soccer (most popular youth team sport), tennis or basketball. Sports such as golf, volleyball, badminton, bowling, and martial arts are also widely enjoyed at the youth and amateur levels.

The Canada Games is the country's highest-level multi-sport event held every two years. Canada has enjoyed success a both the Winter Olympics and at the Summer Olympics—particularly the Winter Games as a "winter sports nation". Canada has hosted high-profile international sporting events such as the 1976 Summer Olympics, the 1988 Winter Olympics, the 2010 Winter Olympics, multiple Commonwealth Games, the 2015 FIFA Women's World Cup, the 2015 Pan American Games and 2015 Parapan American Games. The country co-hosted the 2026 FIFA World Cup alongside Mexico and the United States.

== Statistics ==
=== Participation ===
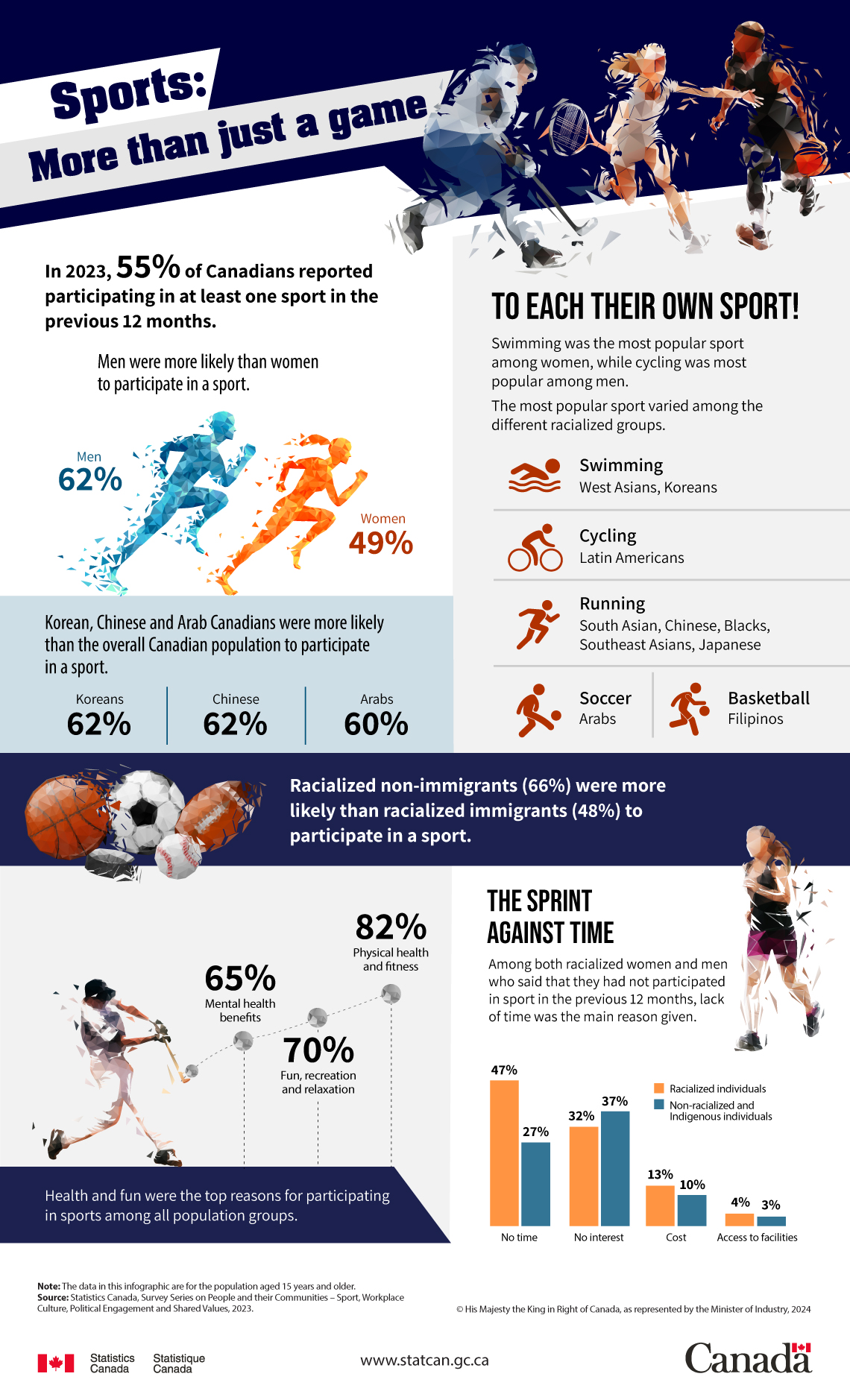

Approximately half of Canadians aged 15 and older participate in sports, with 55% reporting involvement in activities like soccer, ice hockey, swimming, and running. Men's participation (62%) surpasses women's (49%), with notable differences among specific cultural groups. For instance, among Filipino and Black populations, participation is significantly higher for men than women. Korean, Chinese, and Arab Canadians had higher sport participation rates than the general population, with 62% of Koreans and Chinese, and 60% of Arabs participating.

The most popular sport varied by gender and racialized groups, with swimming being favoured by women, while men preferred cycling. Overall swimming is the most popular sport, cited by 35%, followed closely by cycling (33%) and running (27%). While swimming is most popular among the non-racialized population, running is favoured by racialized groups - Chinese (40%), Japanese (35%), Southeast Asian (35%), South Asian (33%) and Black (32%).

Canadian-born individuals showed more interest in winter sports, such as ice skating, skiing and snowboarding, compared to immigrants, who preferred sports like soccer, tennis, or basketball. Hockey is the leading sport among individuals aged 18 to 24, with a participation rate of 21.8%. It is closely succeeded by basketball, which holds a rate of 17.6%, while soccer ranks third with a participation rate of 12.4%. Soccer is the leading sport among young Canadians, with 16% of those aged three to 17 participating in organized soccer. Sports such as baseball, golf, curling, volleyball, badminton, bowling, and martial arts are also widely enjoyed at the youth and amateur levels.

The primary motivations for participating in sports were physical health and fitness (82%), fun and recreation (70%), and mental health benefits (65%). Among those who did not participate in sports, the lack of time was the most common reason given. For racialized individuals, 47% cited no time as a barrier to participation, compared to 27% of non-racialized and Indigenous individuals. Other reasons included lack of interest (32% for racialized and 37% for non-racialized), cost (13% for racialized and 10% for non-racialized), and access to facilities (4% for racialized and 3% for non-racialized).

=== Discrimination ===
In 2023, 25% of Canadians saw racism and discrimination as a problem in community sports. Among those who played sports in the last five years, 18% faced or witnessed unfair treatment. Lesbian and gay Canadians reported discrimination at 42%, compared to 17% of heterosexuals. Young people aged 15 to 24 were more likely to experience these issues at 30%, while only 7% of those aged 65 and older reported similar experiences.

Racialized individuals reported 26% of unfair treatment, higher than the 15% for non-racialized groups. The highest rates came from Black, Filipino, and Korean individuals. The main cause of discrimination was race or skin colour, followed by physical appearance and ethnicity. Most incidents involved participants and spectators rather than officials. Many cases go unreported, with 32% of incidents never reported and some witnesses participating in the discrimination.

=== Viewership ===
In a 2023 national survey, Canadians identified hockey as their preferred sport for viewing. Approximately 22% of participants indicated a preference for hockey, establishing it as the leading choice. Subsequently, 12% stated that they neither watch nor follow sports, while 10% expressed a preference for soccer and 8% favoured basketball.

Respondents from Ontario exhibited a wider array of favourite sports compared to other regions. Regionally, individuals in the Atlantic and Prairie provinces demonstrated a significant inclination towards hockey. Hockey is the most popular sport in Alberta, with 44.7% of Albertans saying they follow it closely. Quebec comes next at 37.9%, followed by Atlantic Canada at 37.7% - despite no National Hockey League team there. In British Columbia, 24.3% follow hockey, and 13% follow soccer. In other prairie provinces, 25% follow hockey, while 15.7% follow football. In Ontario, 24.3% follow hockey, and 11.7% follow baseball - the only province with a Major League Baseball team. A gender analysis revealed that 54% of males opted for one of the leading four sports hockey, soccer, basketball, or baseball whereas only 35% of females did so. This suggests that women are inclined to appreciate a more diverse assortment of sports.

Generational disparities were also evident in the survey findings. Members of Generation X and Baby Boomers showed a greater likelihood of selecting hockey, with 25% and 24% respectively, juxtaposed with Gen Z and Millennials at 13% and 17%. Baby Boomers exhibited a higher propensity to claim that they do not watch any sports compared to other age cohorts. Additionally, Gen Z displayed a stronger preference for soccer than other generations. Basketball emerged as a favoured choice for approximately 17% of Gen Z and Millennials, while only 8% of Generation X and 2% of Baby Boomers selected it.

== History ==
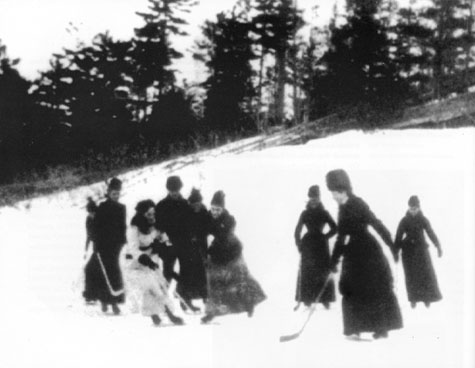
Women playing hockey, Isobel Stanley, daughter of Lord Stanley, is seen wearing white, Rideau Hall on the Rideau Hall rink, Ottawa, circa 1888.

The history of Canadian sports falls into five stages of development: early recreational activities before 1840; the start of organized competition, 1840–1880; the emergence of national organizations, 1882–1914; the rapid growth of both amateur and professional sports, 1914 to 1960; and developments of the last half-century. Some sports, especially ice hockey, lacrosse, curling, and ringette enjoy an international reputation as particularly Canadian. Although typically thought of as American, the origin of the sport of baseball began in the Canadian town of Beachville, Ontario, and American football was initially developed by Canadians at McGill University before two different playing styles emerged, American football and Canadian football. Canadian sports attract large numbers of participants and huge audiences; hockey has become part of the national identity.

== Multi-sport events ==
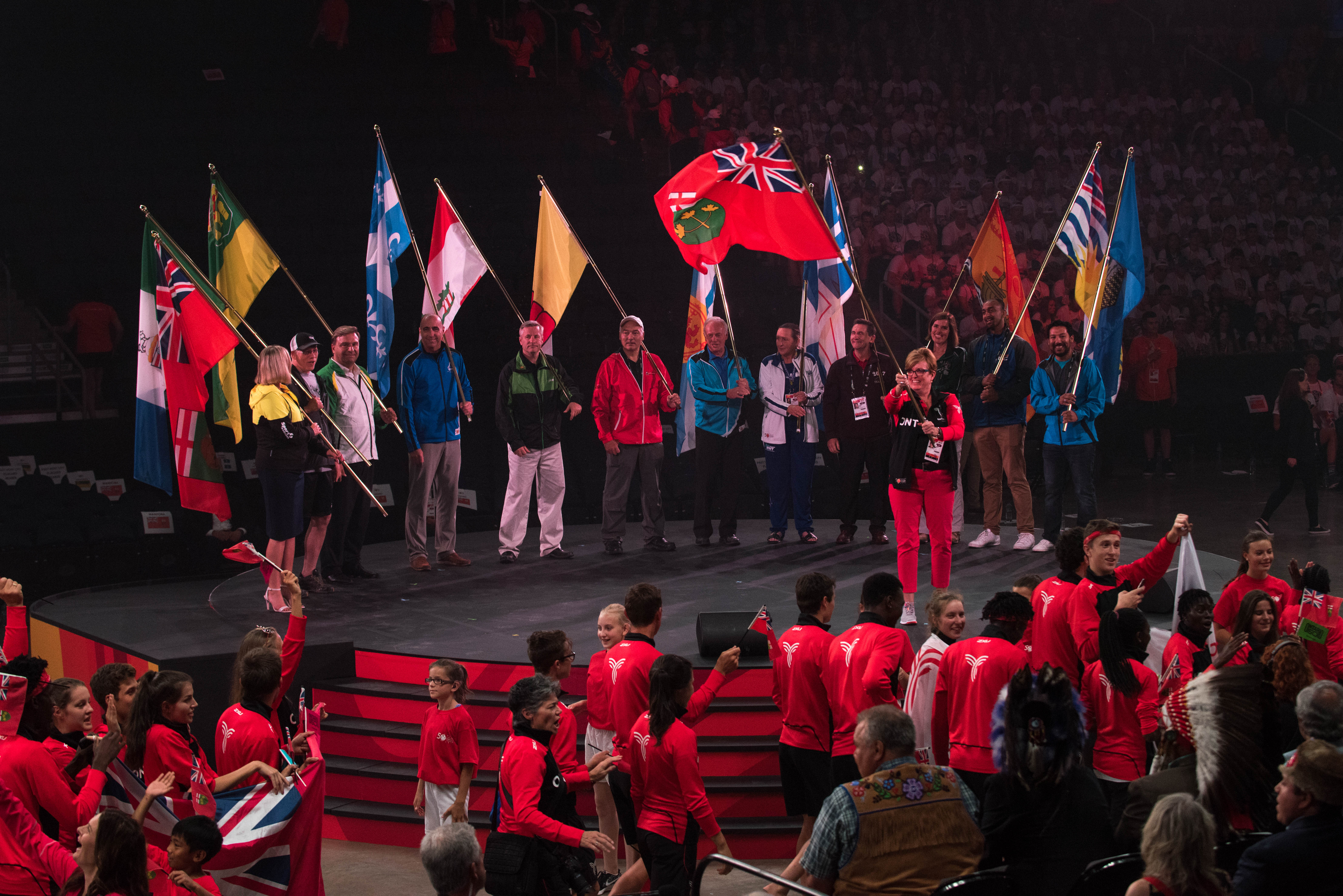
Amateur athletes representing their provinces and territories during the 2017 Canada Games.

Major multi-sport events with Canadian participation, or that have taken place in Canada, are the Olympic Games, Commonwealth Games, Canada Games, World Championships in Athletics, Pan American Games, and the Universiade. Others include the North American Indigenous Games, the World Police and Fire Games, and the Gay Games.

=== Canada Games ===
The Canada Games is a high-level multi-sport event with held every two years in Canada, alternating between the Canada Winter Games and the Canada Summer Games. Athletes are strictly amateur only, and represent their province or territory. Since their inception, the Canada Games have played a prominent role in developing some of Canada's premier athletes, including Lennox Lewis, Catriona Le May Doan, Hayley Wickenheiser, Sidney Crosby, Martin Brodeur, Steve Nash, Suzanne Gaudet and David Ling. The Games were first held in 1967 in Quebec City as part of Canada's Centennial celebrations. Similar events are held on the provincial level, such as the annual BC Games.

=== Commonwealth Games ===
Canada is one of only six nations to have attended every Commonwealth Games, and hosted the first ever British Empire Games in 1930 in Hamilton, Ontario. Canada also hosted the 1954 British Empire and Commonwealth Games in Vancouver, British Columbia, the 1978 Commonwealth Games in Edmonton, Alberta, and the 1994 Commonwealth Games in Victoria, British Columbia. Canada ranks third in the all-time medal tally of Commonwealth Games.

=== Olympic Games ===
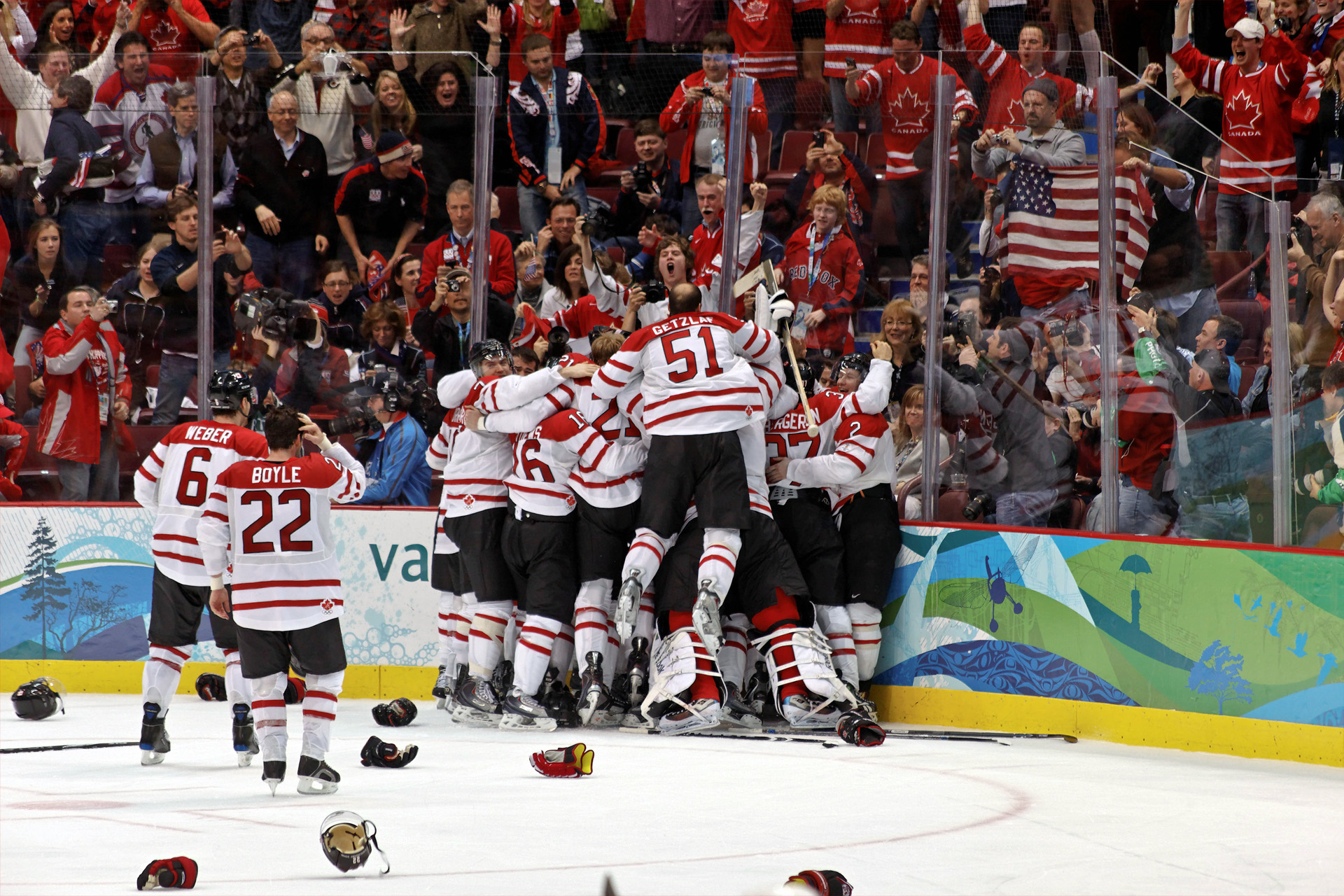
The Canadian men's national ice hockey team celebrates shortly after winning the gold medal final at the 2010 Winter Olympics.

Canada has competed at every Olympic Games, except for the first games in 1896 and the boycotted games in 1980. Canada has previously hosted the games three times, at the 1976 Summer Olympics in Montreal, the 1988 Winter Olympics in Calgary, and the 2010 Winter Olympics in Vancouver.

At the summer games, the majority of Canada's medals come from the sports of athletics, aquatics (swimming, synchronized swimming and diving), rowing and canoeing/kayaking. In the post-boycott era (since 1988), Canada's medal total ranks 19th in the world, with the highest rank of 11th in 1992 and the lowest of 24th in 2000.

At the winter games, Canada is usually one of the top nations in terms of medals won. Canada is traditionally strong in the sports of ice hockey, speed skating (especially the short track variation), figure skating and most of the national men's and women's curling teams have won medals since the sport was added to the Olympic program.

Because Canada failed to win any gold medals at the 1976 Summer and 1988 Winter games, soon after Vancouver-Whistler was awarded the 2010 Winter Olympics several organizations including Sport Canada and the Canadian Olympic Committee began collaborations to launch "Own the Podium – 2010", a development program to help Canada earn the most medals at the 2010 Games. Canada did not win the most total medals at the Vancouver Olympics (they finished third, behind the United States, whose 37 total medals was the most of any country at a single Winter Olympics, and Germany, with 26), but did win the most gold medals, with 14, the most of any country at a single Winter Olympics.

The National Sport School in Calgary, founded 1994, is the first Canadian high school designed exclusively for Olympic-calibre athletes.

=== Pan American Games ===
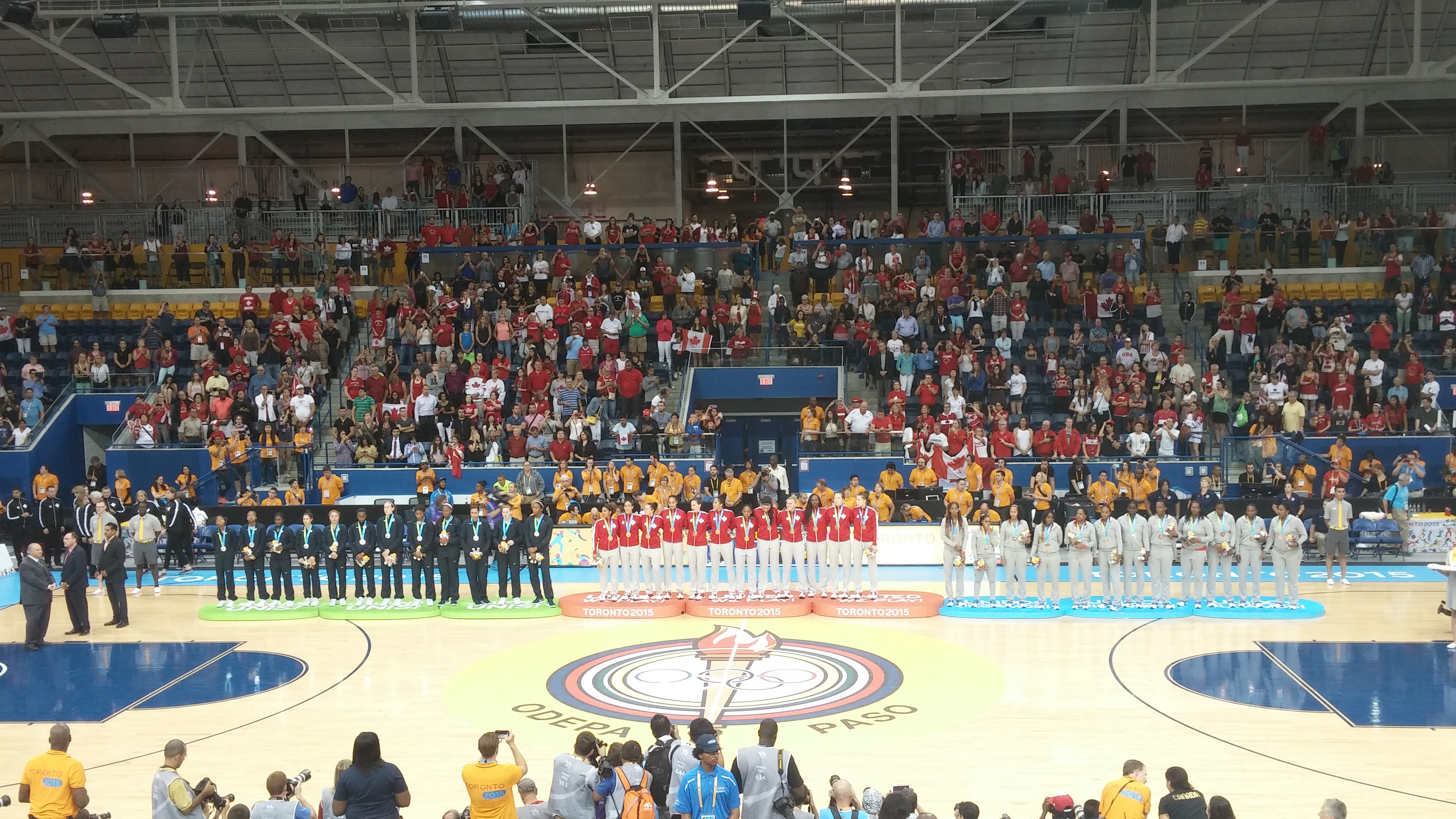
Canada women's national basketball team shortly after they were awarded the gold medal at the 2015 Pan American Games.

Canada has participated in each of the Pan American Games since the second edition of the games, held in Mexico City in 1955. The fifth games took place in Winnipeg in 1967, Canada's Centennial year. Winnipeg hosted again in 1999. Toronto was selected as the host city for the 2015 games, which was held in July 2015 in venues located in Toronto and several surrounding municipalities.

== National sports ==
Canada has two de jure national sports: ice hockey and lacrosse.

In May 1964, former Canadian Amateur Hockey Association president and then current member of parliament Jack Roxburgh did extensive research to find if Canadian parliament had ever declared a national game, and specifically looked into whether lacrosse was officially declared. After going through parliamentary records, he found no law was ever enacted. The Canadian Press reported at the time that the myth of lacrosse as Canada's national game possibly came from a book published in 1869 titled Lacrosse, the National Game of Canada, and that the Canadian Lacrosse Association was founded in 1867. His endeavour to declare hockey as Canada's national game coincided with the Great Canadian Flag Debate of 1964. On October 28, 1964, Roxburgh moved to introduce Bill C–132, with respect to declaring hockey as the national game of Canada.

Canadian Lacrosse Association members responded to the motion by calling it insulting and "out of line", and vowed to fight it. On June 11, 1965, Bob Prittie replied by introducing a separate bill to have lacrosse declared as Canada's national game and stated that, "I think it is fitting at this time when we are considering national flags, national anthems and other national symbols, that this particular matter should be settled now". The choice of Canada's national game was debated in 1965, but neither bill was passed when parliament was dissolved. In 1967, Prime Minister Lester B. Pearson proposed to name national summer and winter games, but nothing was resolved.

In 1994, First Nations groups objected to a government bill that proposed establishing ice hockey as Canada's national sport, arguing that it neglected recognition of the game of lacrosse, a uniquely Indigenous contribution. In response, the House of Commons amended a bill "to recognize hockey as Canada's Winter Sport and lacrosse as Canada's Summer Sport". On May 12, 1994, the National Sports of Canada Act came into force with these designations.

Although the legislation included seasonal designations, both sports can be played in different seasons. Lacrosse can be played all year, in all seasons, indoor and outdoors. During colder seasons ice hockey may be played indoor and outdoors, although in warmer seasons, its play requires the use of artificial ice, typically found at an indoor ice rink.

=== Ice hockey ===
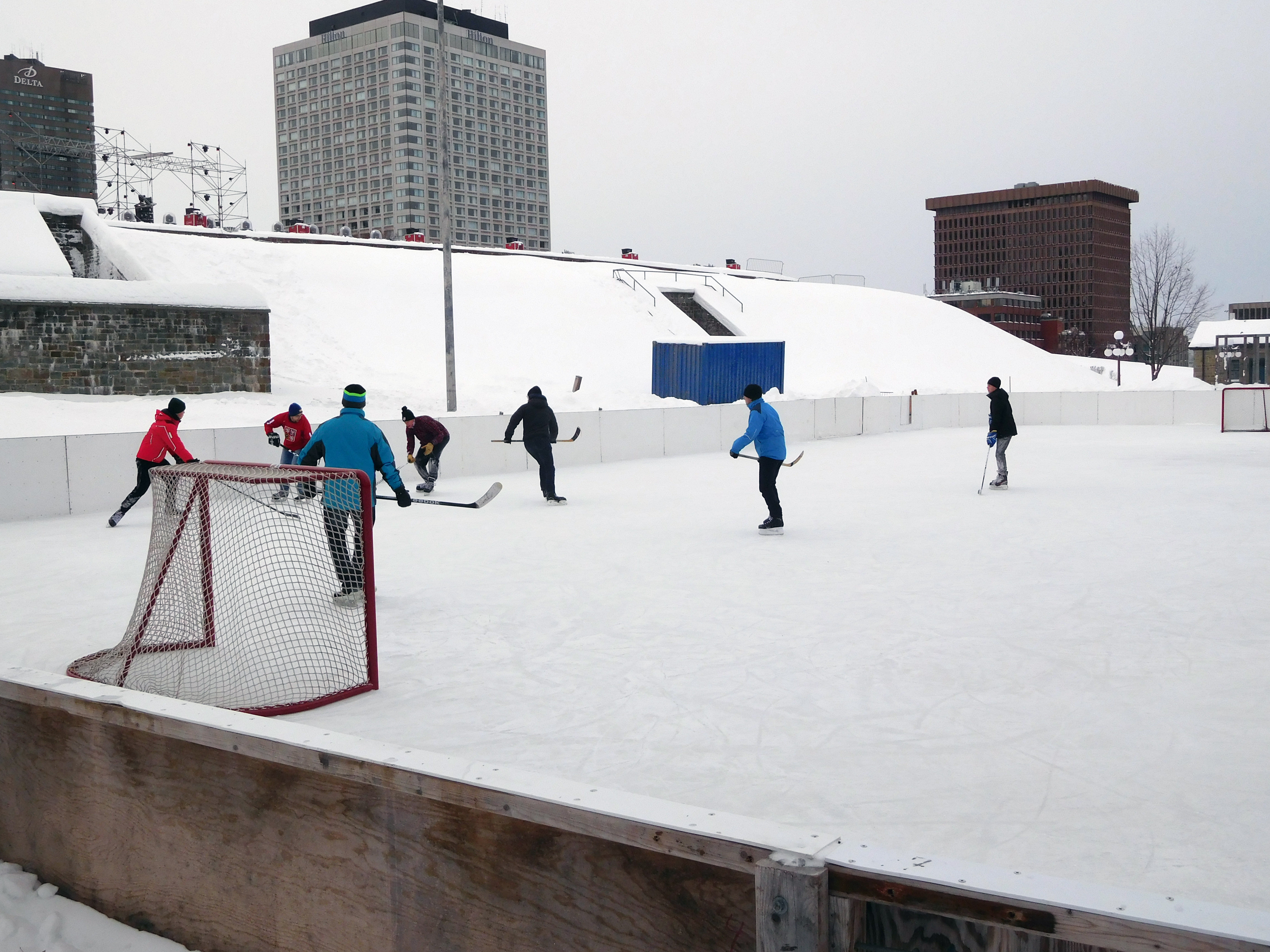
A game of pick-up hockey in progress at Esplande Park in Quebec City.

The modern form of ice hockey began in Canada in the late 19th century, and is widely considered Canada's national pastime, with high levels of participation by children, men and women at various levels of competition. The Stanley Cup, considered the premiere trophy in professional ice hockey, originated in Canada in 1893. Prominent trophies for national championships in Canada are the Memorial Cup for the top junior-age men's team and the Allan Cup for the top men's senior team. There are national championships in several other divisions of play. Hockey Canada is the sport's official governing body in Canada and is a member of the International Ice Hockey Federation (IIHF). A Canadian national men's team, composed of professionals, competes in the annual IIHF Men's World Championship and in the Olympics.

The National Hockey League (NHL) is a professional hockey league that includes teams from both Canada and the United States. Presently, the NHL includes seven teams in Canada: the Calgary Flames, Edmonton Oilers, Montreal Canadiens, Ottawa Senators, Toronto Maple Leafs, Vancouver Canucks, and the Winnipeg Jets. The Canadian NHL presence peaked with eight teams in the mid-1990s, before the Quebec Nordiques relocated to Denver, Colorado in 1995 and a previous incarnation of the Winnipeg Jets relocated to Phoenix, Arizona in 1996. The NHL returned to Winnipeg in 2011 when the Atlanta Thrashers relocated and became the current Winnipeg Jets. The league, founded in Canada, retains a substantial Canadian content as roughly half of its players are Canadian. Hockey Night in Canada is a longtime national Saturday night television broadcast that up until 2026, featured Canadian NHL teams. Starting in the 2026-27 season, Hockey Night in Canada will air eight Saturday night games from the Professional Women's Hockey League. Junior-age ice hockey is also a popular spectator sport. The junior-age Canadian Hockey League is broadcast nationally and its annual Memorial Cup championship is a popular television event. The annual IIHF World U20 Championship, played during December and January, is popular among Canadian television viewers and has been held in Canada numerous times due to its popularity.

=== Lacrosse ===
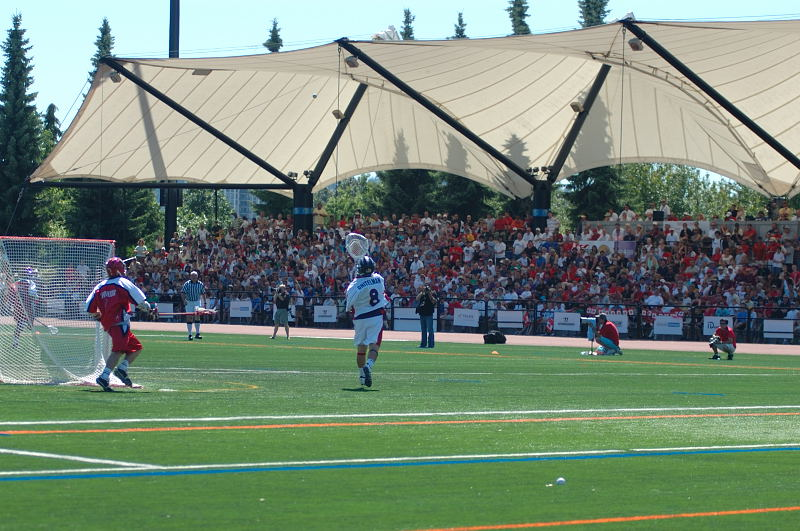
A lacrosse game between Canada and the United States at the 2008 U-19 World Lacrosse Championship.

The First Nations began playing lacrosse more than 500 years ago. Today, lacrosse not only remains an integral part of Indigenous culture, but is played by tens of thousands of people across Canada and the United States. From its origin as 'The Creator's Game,' lacrosse has survived the test of time after treading down a long, controversial path that led it to become recognized as Canada's official national summer sport.

The Canadian Lacrosse Association, founded in 1925, is the governing body of lacrosse in Canada. It conducts national junior and senior championship tournaments for men and women in both field and box lacrosse. It also participated in the inaugural World Indoor Lacrosse Championship in 2003. As of 2018, the only active professional lacrosse league in Canada is the National Lacrosse League, which plays a variation of the game known as box lacrosse. A total of six of the league's thirteen franchises are located in Canada: the Vancouver Warriors, Calgary Roughnecks, Saskatchewan Rush, Toronto Rock, Oshawa FireWolves, and Halifax Thunderbirds. The 2006 World Lacrosse Championship was held in London, Ontario. Canada beat the United States 15–10 in the final to break a 28-year U.S. winning streak. One of the best lacrosse players of all time, Gary Gait was born in Victoria, British Columbia and has won every possible major lacrosse championship. Great achievements in Canadian Lacrosse are recognized by the Canadian Lacrosse Hall of Fame.

== Popular team sports ==
Canada's most popular team sports, besides hockey and lacrosse:

=== Canadian football ===
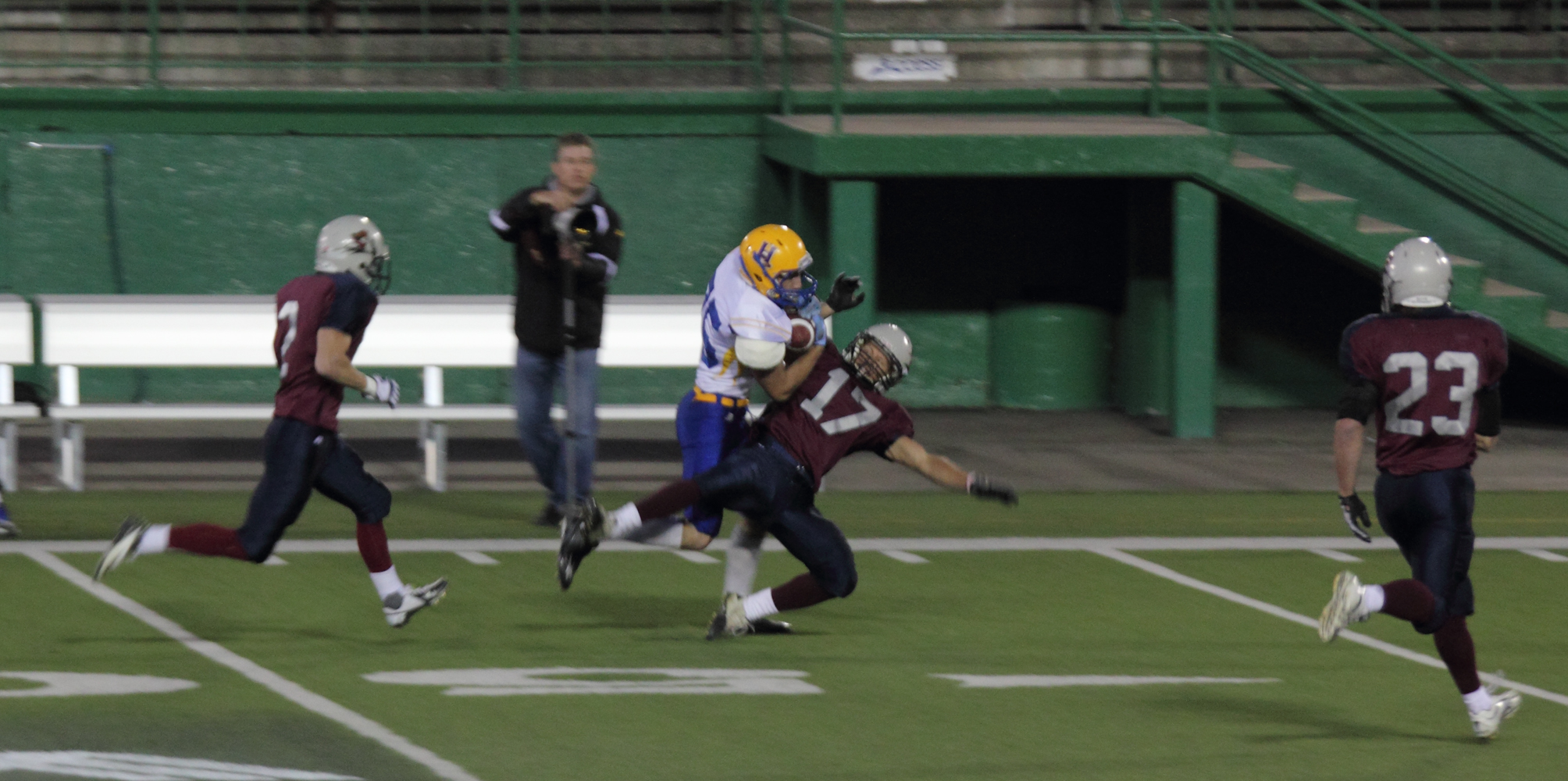
A game between the Regina Thunder and the Saskatoon Hilltops of the Canadian Junior Football League at Taylor Field (Mosaic Stadium).

In Canada, the term "football" is used to refer to Canadian football, a gridiron-based game closely related to but distinct from American football as played in the United States. Canadian football has its origins in Rugby football beginning in the early 1860s, but, over time, a unique code known as Canadian football developed. The first documented football match was a game played at University College, University of Toronto on November 9, 1861. One of the participants in the game involving University of Toronto students was (Sir) William Mulock, later Chancellor of the school. A football club was formed at the university soon afterward, although its rules of play at this stage are unclear. In 1864, at Trinity College, Toronto, F. Barlow Cumberland and Frederick A. Bethune devised rules based on rugby football.

However, modern Canadian football is widely regarded as having originated with a game of rugby played in Montreal, in 1865, when British Army officers played local civilians. The game gradually gained a following, and the Montreal Football Club was formed in 1868, the first recorded non-university football club in Canada. This "rugby-football" soon became popular at Montreal's McGill University. McGill challenged Harvard University to a game, in 1874. The game grew separately in parallel from this point onward in the U.S. and Canada.

Both the Canadian Football League (CFL), the sport's only professional league in Canada, and Football Canada, the governing body for amateur play, trace their roots to 1884 and the founding of the Canadian Rugby Football Union. Currently active teams such as the Toronto Argonauts and Hamilton Tiger-Cats have similar longevity. The CFL's championship game, the Grey Cup, is the country's single largest sporting event and is watched by nearly one third of Canadian television households. The nine CFL teams are the BC Lions, Calgary Stampeders, Edmonton Elks, Saskatchewan Roughriders, Winnipeg Blue Bombers, Hamilton Tiger-Cats, Toronto Argonauts, Ottawa Redblacks, and Montreal Alouettes.

Canadian football is also played at the high school, junior, collegiate, semi-professional, and amateur levels. The Canadian Junior Football League and Quebec Junior Football League are for players aged 18–22. Post-secondary institutions in U Sports compete for the Vanier Cup. Canada also has three women's leagues: the Maritime Women's Football League, the Central Canadian Women's Football League, and the Western Women's Canadian Football League. The WWCFL is the biggest women's league, featuring seven teams in Alberta, Saskatchewan, and Manitoba. Senior leagues such as the Alberta Football League have also grown in popularity in recent years. Great achievements in Canadian football are recognized by the Canadian Football Hall of Fame; located at Tim Hortons Field in Hamilton, Ontario.

=== Soccer ===
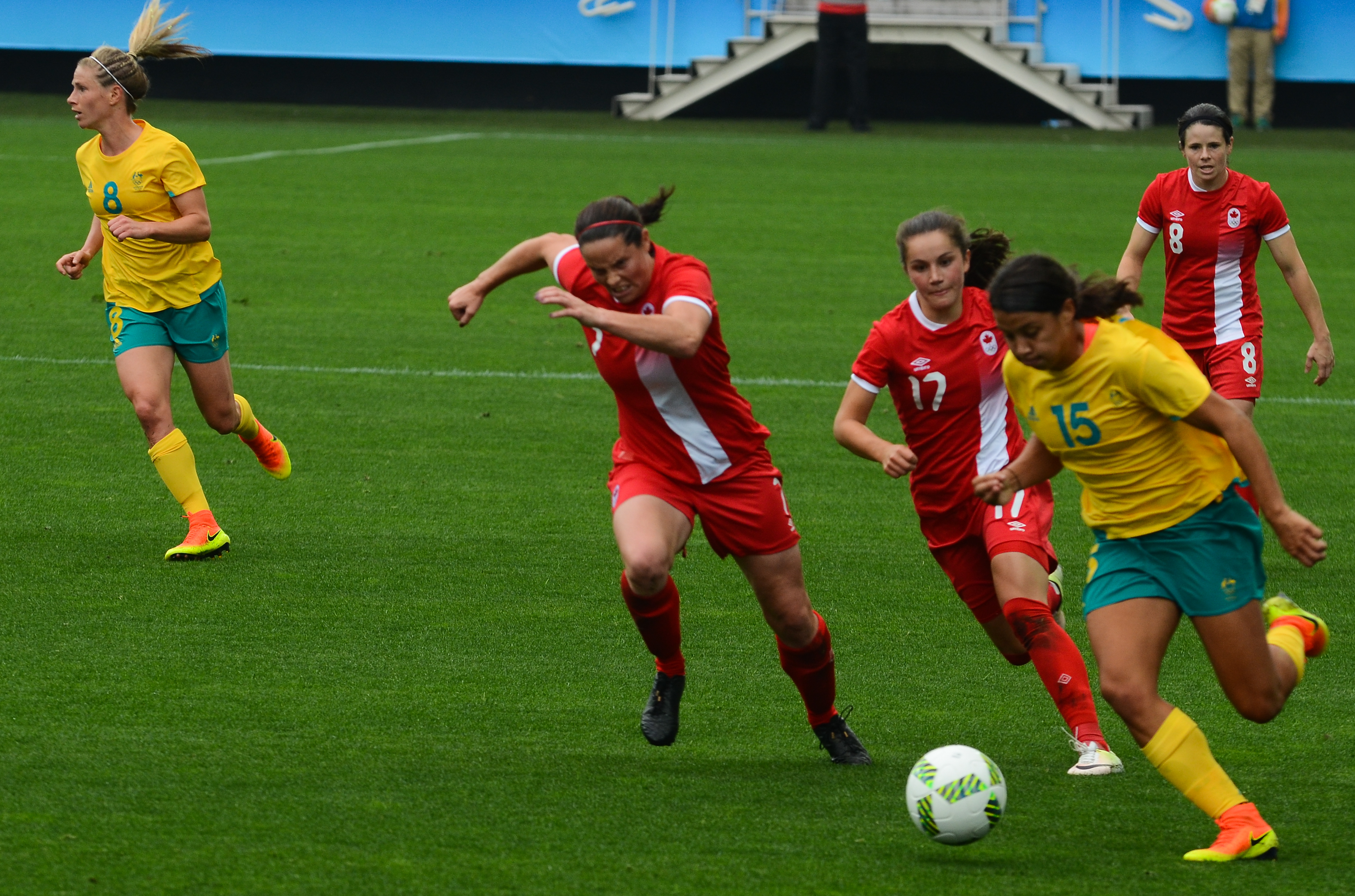
The Canadian women's national soccer team in a soccer game against Australia during the 2016 Summer Olympics.

Soccer has been played in Canada since 1876. The Dominion of Canada Football Association was inaugurated on May 24, 1912, and initially became a member of the Fédération Internationale de Football Association on December 31, 1912. Today, Canada's governing body for soccer (both professional and amateur) is known as the Canadian Soccer Association.

Soccer is the highest participation sport in Canada, with 847,616 registered players (according to the Canada Soccer 2012 Yearbook). Male/female participation is split roughly 59/41 percent. There are 1,456 clubs in 139 districts across 12 regions (provincial and territory member associations).

Canada's annual amateur competition is known as the National Championships. Senior men's teams play for The Challenge Trophy while senior women's teams play for The Jubilee Trophy. The men's national competition was first played in 1913, with the trophy (Connaught Cup) donated by Canadian Governor-General, the Duke of Connaught. The women's national competition was first played in 1982. The Canadian Soccer Association's annual National Championships also feature competitions at the U-18, U-16 and U-14 levels. At all levels, clubs qualify for the National Championships through their respective provincial championships.

At the St. Louis 1904 Olympics, Canada won the gold medal in soccer. The Canadian team was represented by Galt FC of Ontario. From 1967 to 1988, Canada's best men's amateur soccer players also participated in Olympic Qualifying tournaments (although in the 1980s a number of those players were indeed professional). Canada qualified as host of the Montréal 1976 Olympics and then again for the Los Angeles 1984 Olympics (where it finished fifth overall). Since the early 1990s, the Men's olympic qualifying tournaments have featured U-23 players (with a mix of professional and amateur/university players).

==== Professional soccer ====
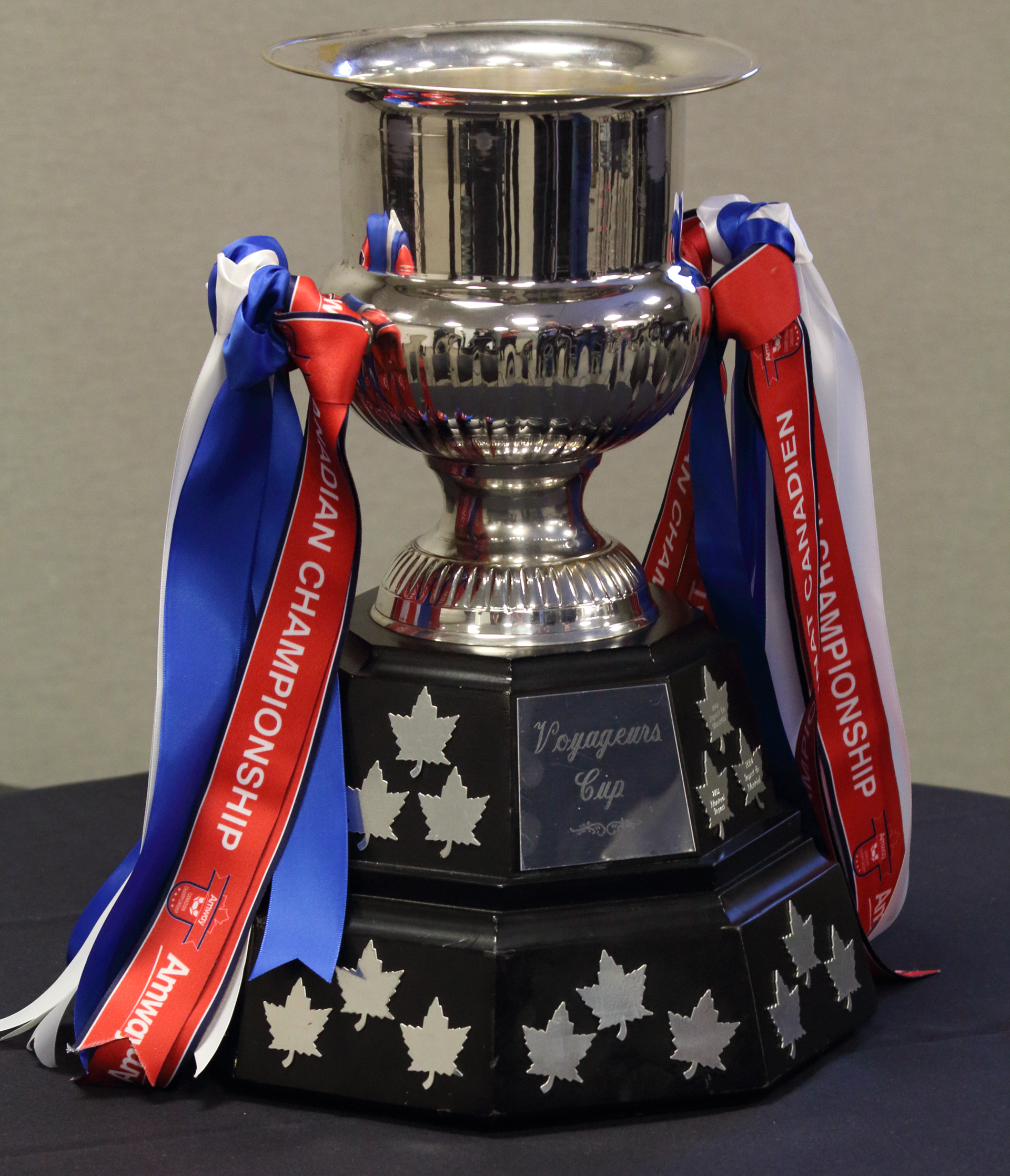
The Voyageurs Cup is a trophy for the Canadian Championship, an annual soccer tournament for professional teams in Canada.

Canada's annual professional competition is the Canadian Championship, which is contested between Toronto FC, Vancouver Whitecaps FC, CF Montréal, all eight Canadian Premier League teams, and the champions of League1 British Columbia, League1 Ontario, and the Première Ligue de soccer du Québec. The national champion qualifies for the CONCACAF Champions Cup, from which a confederation champion then qualifies for the annual FIFA Club World Cup. Toronto FC is the only Canadian club to have won the MLS Cup, having done so on December 9, 2017.

A minority of the teams in the Canadian Championship play in U.S.-based leagues. Toronto FC, Vancouver Whitecaps FC and CF Montréal play in Major League Soccer. FC Edmonton played in the second-level North American Soccer League until going dormant in late 2017, and Ottawa Fury FC voluntarily dropped from the NASL to the third-level United Soccer League, now known as the USL Championship (USLC), after the 2016 season. FC Edmonton ultimately resumed professional operations in 2019 as inaugural Canadian Premier League members, while Fury FC continued in the USLC until folding after the 2019 season.

Two other Canadian professional sides play in U.S.-based leagues. Toronto FC's reserve side, Toronto FC II, which is ineligible for the Canadian Championship due to its relation to the MLS side, started play in the league now known as the USLC in 2014, and remained at that level through the 2018 season. In 2019, TFC II moved to the new third-level USL League One, continuing to play in that league through the 2021 season before moving to the newly established MLS Next Pro, a different third-level league made up almost entirely of MLS reserve sides, in 2022. Whitecaps FC revived its former reserve side of Whitecaps FC 2 in 2022 after a five-year hiatus, with Whitecaps 2 also playing in Next Pro. Whitecaps 2, also ineligible for the Canadian Championship due to its relationship with the MLS side, will adopt a new name after the 2023 season.

The Canadian Premier League (CPL) is a professional soccer league that began play in spring 2019, consisting of an initial seven teams; one is based in the outer suburbs of Toronto, with all others in Canadian markets not served by Major League Soccer. An eighth team, Atlético Ottawa, began CPL play in 2020, while Vancouver FC debuted in 2023 as the league's ninth team. Two more teams have been announced for Saskatoon and Windsor, but no entry dates have been announced. The league has a minimum requirement of Canadian players on each roster and an annual draft of U Sports players, to develop Canadian talent. The eventual goal of the league is to have multiple divisions with promotion and relegation. Effective with the 2023 season, the team that tops the CPL regular-season table and the winner of the postseason playoffs qualify for the following year's CONCACAF Champions Cup.

Canada's best soccer players—male and female—play in professional leagues around the world. Players are called into the national program at different times of the year, primarily in conjunction with the FIFA International Calendar (when professional clubs are required to release players for national duty).

Canada's national teams compete in CONCACAF, the Confederation of North, Central American and Caribbean Association Football. Canada's national "A" team has won two CONCACAF championships: in 1985 to qualify for the 1986 FIFA World Cup and in 2000 to qualify for the FIFA Confederations Cup. In 2022, the men's side finished first in the final CONCACAF qualifying group for the 2022 FIFA World Cup. They also qualified for the 2026 FIFA World Cup as hosts.

Canada's women's "A" team has also won two CONCACAF championships: in 1998 and 2010. The Canadian women have participated in six FIFA Women's World Cups (Sweden 1995, United States 1999, United States 2003, China 2007, Germany 2011 and as hosts in 2015) and four Women's Olympic Football Tournaments (Beijing 2008, London 2012, Rio 2016, and Tokyo 2020/21), winning bronze medals in both London and Rio and gold in Tokyo. Canada also hosted the FIFA Women's World Cup in 2015. The country has also hosted four age-grade World Cups—the FIFA U-17 World Cup in 1987 (when the age limit was 16 instead of the current 17), the inaugural FIFA U-20 Women's World Cup in 2002 (when the age limit was 19 instead of 20), the FIFA U-20 World Cup in 2007, and the U-20 Women's World Cup for a second time in 2014. Canada hosted the 2026 FIFA World Cup jointly with Mexico and the United States, with matches taking place at BMO Field in Toronto and BC Place in Vancouver, respectively.

=== Baseball ===
The world's first documented baseball game took place in Beachville, Ontario, on June 4, 1838. Although more strongly associated with the United States, baseball has existed in Canada from the very beginning. The world's oldest baseball park still in operation is Labatt Park in London, Ontario. It is home to the London Majors of the semi-pro Canadian Baseball League.

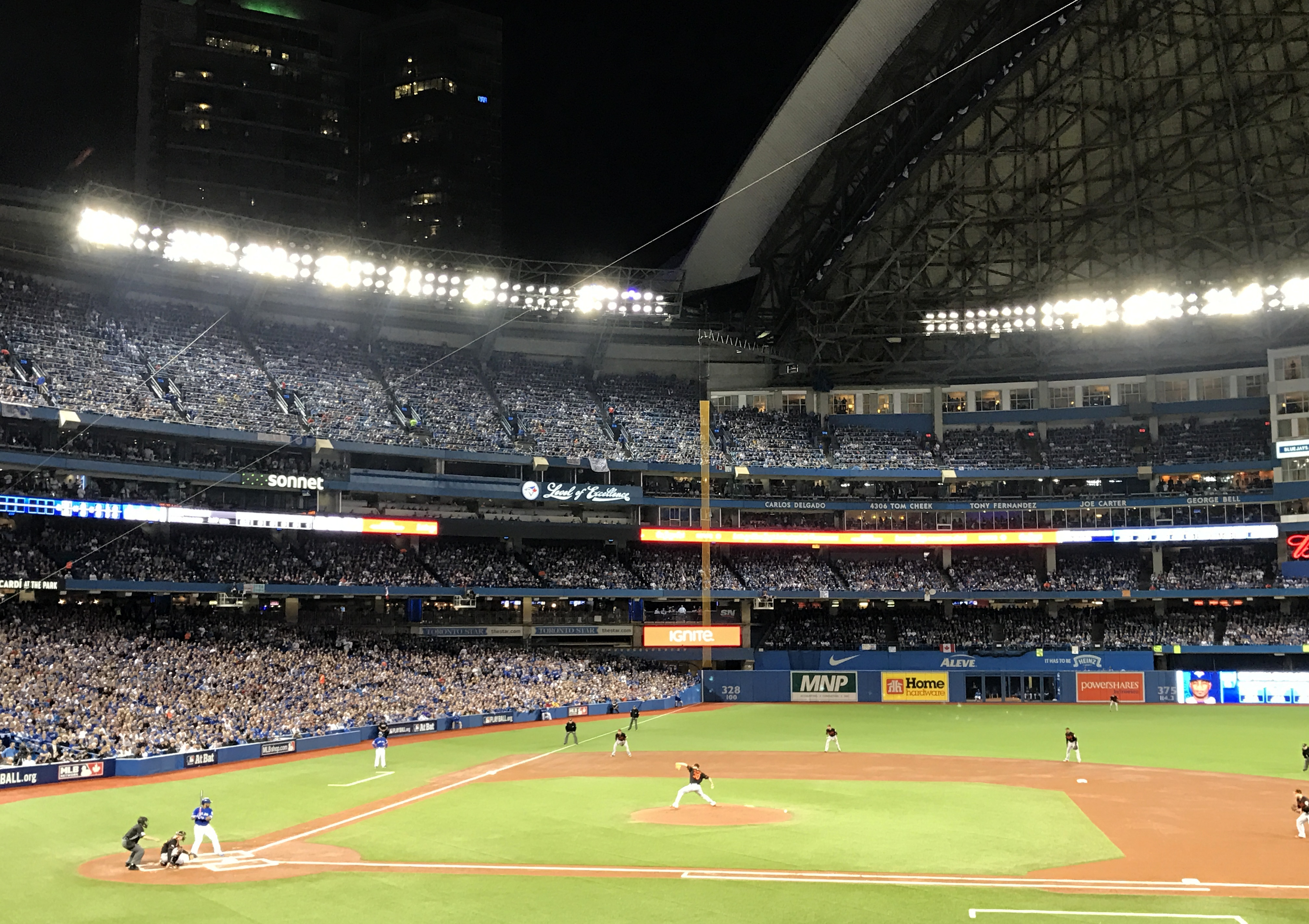
The 2016 American League Wild Card Game at Rogers Centre in Toronto. Since 2005, the Toronto Blue Jays are the only Canadian team in Major League Baseball.

Presently, the Toronto Blue Jays are Canada's only Major League Baseball team, founded in 1977. The Montreal Expos (the first MLB team in Canada) played in Montreal from 1969 until 2004 when they moved to Washington, D.C., and became the Washington Nationals. The Blue Jays were the first non-American team to host a World Series Game (in 1992) and the only non-American team to win the World Series (back to back in 1992 and 1993). The Blue Jays had the highest attendance in Major League Baseball during the late 1980s and early 1990s. Professional baseball has a long history in Canada, beginning with teams such as the London Tecumsehs, Montreal Royals, and Toronto Maple Leafs in the late 19th and early 20th centuries. All three were included on the National Baseball Association's top 100 minor league teams.

A number of Canadians have played in the major leagues, and several have won the highest honours in baseball. Ferguson Jenkins won the National League Cy Young Award in 1971 as the best pitcher in the league, and in 1991 became the first Canadian inducted in the (U.S.) Baseball Hall of Fame. Larry Walker, inducted in 2020, was National League MVP for the 1997 season and was the league's batting champion 3 times. Since 2000, Éric Gagné won the National League Cy Young Award in 2003, Jason Bay was the first Canadian to be named rookie of the year in 2004, and Justin Morneau (American League, 2006), Joey Votto (National League, 2010) and Freddie Freeman (National League, 2020) (Note: Freeman was born and raised in California, but both of his parents were born in Canada, giving him dual Canada–U.S. citizenship from birth.) have won MVP honours.

The Canada national baseball team has participated in all editions of the World Baseball Classic. In the 2006 World Baseball Classic, the team upset Team USA in first-round play, which some people in Canada call the "Miracle on Dirt" (a play on the phrase "Miracle on Ice" for the 1980 U.S. Olympic Hockey team). However, the team has yet to progress past the first round.

The only Canadian team in MLB-affiliated minor leagues is the Vancouver Canadians of the Northwest League (High-A). There are a number of independent minor league teams, as well as semi-professional and collegiate baseball teams in Canada (see List of baseball teams in Canada). Great achievements in Canadian baseball are recognized by the Canadian Baseball Hall of Fame.

=== Basketball ===
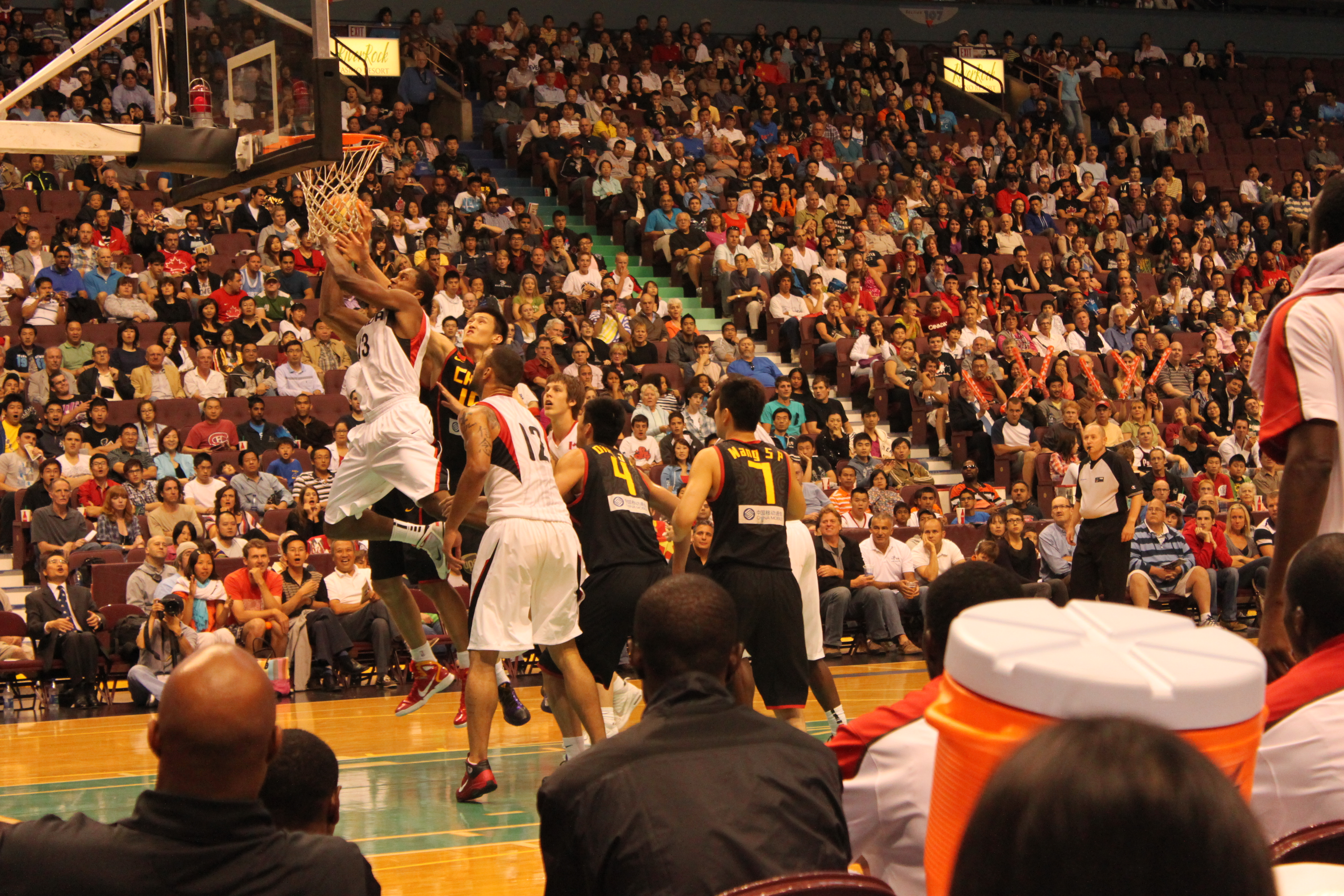
The Canadian men's national basketball team playing an exhibition game against the Chinese men's national basketball team.

Basketball has very strong roots in Canada. The inventor, James Naismith, was Canadian; born in Almonte, Ontario, he was working as a physical education instructor in Massachusetts when he created the game in 1891. Four of the players in that first game were Canadian student-instructors, who later helped spread the game to Canada. Basketball is a popular sport in parts of Canada, especially in Nova Scotia, Southern Alberta, and more recently Southern Ontario.

The popularity of basketball in Nova Scotia is at the high school and college level. Nova Scotia is home to three perennially strong college basketball programs. Saint Mary's University, Acadia University, and St. Francis Xavier University have made 22, 21, and 13 appearances in the U Sports men's championship, respectively. Carleton University has dominated the U Sports championship in recent years, winning 14 titles in 17 years from 2003 to the present.

Four Canadian-born individuals and one naturalized Canadian have been inducted to the Naismith Memorial Basketball Hall of Fame—Naismith and longtime U.S. college coach and instructor Pete Newell as contributors; Ernie Quigley, who officiated over 1,500 U.S. college games, as a referee; and Bob Houbregs, a superstar at the University of Washington in the early 1950s who went on to a career in the NBA. Newell is also separately recognized by the Hall as the head coach of the 1960 USA Olympic team, which won a gold medal in overwhelming fashion and was inducted as a unit in 2010. The most recent Canadian to enter the Naismith Hall is Steve Nash, born in South Africa but raised from early childhood in Victoria, British Columbia, a two-time NBA MVP who was inducted in 2016.

The National Basketball Association (NBA) recognizes its first ever game as being a contest between the New York Knickerbockers and Toronto Huskies at Toronto's Maple Leaf Gardens on November 1, 1946. The NBA expanded into Canada in 1995 with the addition of the Toronto Raptors and Vancouver Grizzlies. The Grizzlies moved to Memphis, Tennessee in 2001, but the Raptors continue to draw healthy crowds at Scotiabank Arena. The Raptors won the title of the 2018–19 NBA season.

A record 16 Canadian players—14 born in the country and two naturalized—were on NBA rosters at the start of the 2019–20 season. This was also a record for the number of players from any single non-U.S. country at the start of any NBA season.

=== Calendar of the major men's and women's professional sports leagues in Canada ===
Men's
Jan	Feb	Mar	Apr	May	June	July	Aug	Sept	Oct	Nov	Dec
NHL (Ice hockey)									NHL (Ice hockey)		
					CFL (Football)						
	MLS (Soccer) (Note: League schedule valid only for the year 2026. On November 13, 2025, MLS announced that it will transition to a summer-to-spring schedule, beginning in 2027. The regular season will begin in mid-July, a winter break will take place from mid-December to early or mid-February, and the MLS Cup playoffs will occur in May. As part of the transition process, the league will play an abbreviated 2027 season in early 2027, followed by the 2027–28 season in July.)										
		MLB (Baseball)									
NBA (Basketball)									NBA (Basketball)		
NLL (Box lacrosse)										NLL (Box lacrosse)	

Women's
Jan	Feb	Mar	Apr	May	June	July	Aug	Sept	Oct	Nov	Dec
PWHL (Ice hockey)											PWHL (Ice hockey)
			NSL (Soccer)								

== Other team sports ==
=== Cricket ===
The earliest reports of cricket in Canada date from 1785 where games seem to have taken place in Montreal. The first reference to cricket being played on an organized basis is in 1834 when a club was founded in Toronto and there are reports of matches being played in Hamilton and Guelph. Along with the United States, Canada was one of the two participants in the first international cricket match, which took place in September 1884. In 1867, Canadian prime minister John A. MacDonald and his cabinet declared cricket to be Canada's first official sport.

=== Curling ===
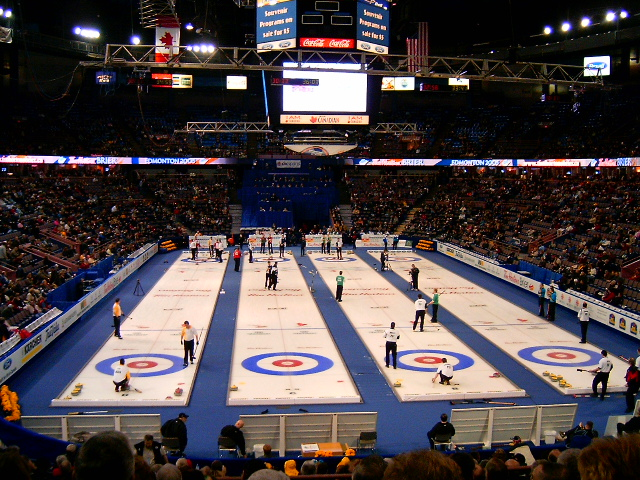
The 2005 Brier. The Brier is the annual Canadian men's curling championship.

Curling competitions in Canada include the Montana's Brier (national men's championship) and Scotties Tournament of Hearts (national women's championship.) Men's and women's (and mixed teams) national champions move on to annual international competitions, where Canadian teams have historically dominated (even over the country of curling's origin, Scotland). The Continental Cup features a Canada vs. The World format. Professional curling competitions include the Grand Slam of Curling, part of the World Curling Tour. Curling Canada is the sport's national governing body; achievements are recognized by the Canadian Curling Hall of Fame.

=== Disc sports ===
In Canada, organized disc sports began in the early 1970s, with promotional efforts from Irwin Toy (Frisbee distributor in Canada), the Canadian Open Frisbee Championships, Toronto (1972–85) and professionals using Frisbee show tours to perform at universities, fairs and sporting events. Disc sports such as freestyle, disc dog (with a human handler throwing discs for a dog to catch), double disc court, guts, ultimate and disc golf became this sport's first events. Two sports, the team sport of disc ultimate and disc golf are very popular worldwide and are now being played semi-professionally. The World Flying Disc Federation, Professional Disc Golf Association, and the Freestyle Players Association are the rules and sanctioning organizations for flying disc sports worldwide. Ultimate Canada is the rules and sanctioning organization for disc ultimate in Canada.

In 2013, as a founding partner, the Toronto Ultimate Club presented Canada's first semi-professional Ultimate team, the Toronto Rush, to the American Ultimate Disc League (AUDL). They went undefeated 18–0 and won the AUDL Championships. In 2014, the Montreal Royal and the Vancouver Riptide joined the AUDL. From 2015 to 2022, the Ottawa Outlaws competed in the AUDL, becoming the fourth Canadian franchise of 26 teams in total.

In 2015, the International Olympic Committee (IOC) granted full recognition to the World Flying Disc Federation (WFDF) for flying disc sports including Ultimate.

=== Ringette ===
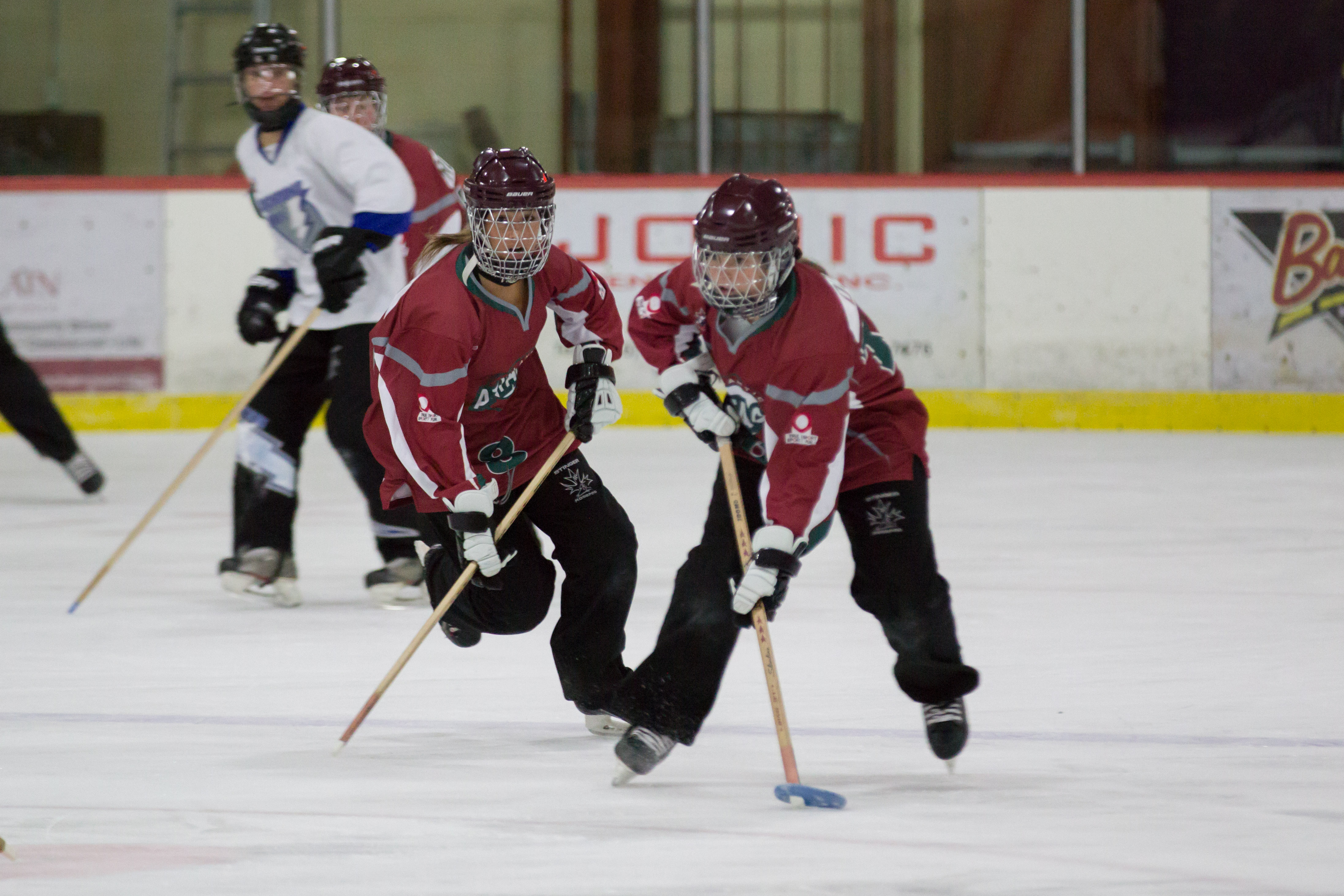
Women playing ringette in Canada's National Ringette League

Ringette first appeared in Canada in 1963 after it was first conceptualized by Sam Jacks, a former Toronto YMCA director who served as a Canadian soldier during World War II. Created specifically for girls by Sam Jacks while he was living in North Bay, Ontario, the sport is now most popularly played by girls and women of all ages and has experienced its greatest success in Canada and Finland. Unlike most organized sports, all of ringette's top athletes are female, one of the sport's most distinctive features.

By the 1980s, ringette surpassed female ice hockey in national registrations. While the sport lost potential talent once women's ice hockey became an Olympic sport, the 21st century has seen the sport regain popularity.

Canada's semi-professional ringette league, the National Ringette League (NRL) formed in 2004, becoming the first winter team sports league in North America to feature elite female athletes rather than male. The NRL acts as a showcase league for the sport.

=== Rugby league ===
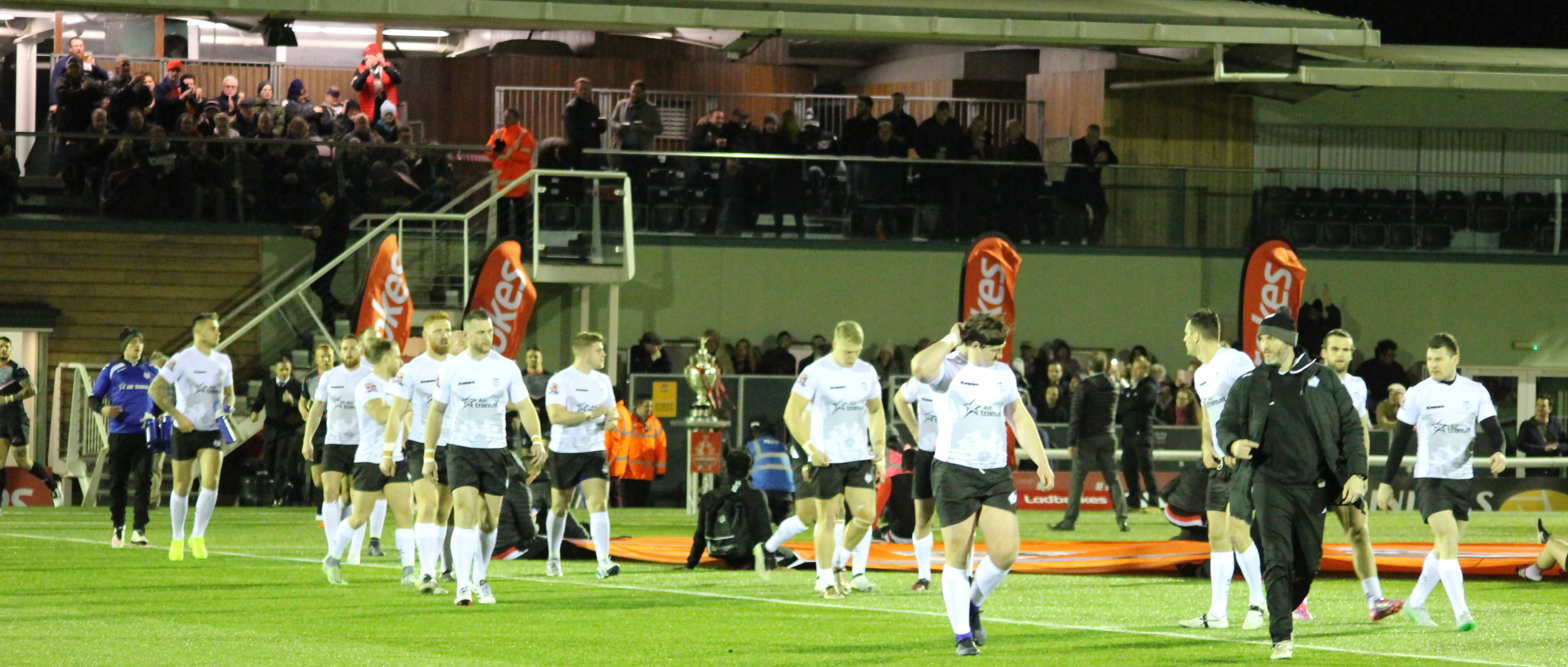
The Toronto Wolfpack take the field against the London Broncos. Competing in the Super League, the Wolfpark is Canada's first fully professional rugby team.

Rugby league first appeared in Canada in the 20th century, although by the end of the 1980s, the sport had disappeared entirely from the nation. However, the 21st century has seen the game gain popularity in Canada. Internationally, Canada is represented by the Canadian Wolverines. Domestically, the Canada Rugby League (CRL) runs several amateur and semi-professional club competitions.

Toronto Wolfpack, the first fully professional team of any code of rugby football in Canada, began play in 2017 in the predominantly British and French Rugby Football League system. The franchise started in the 3rd tier League 1, which offers a route to the Super League and won promotion to the 2nd tier Championship in its inaugural season. The Wolfpack spent two seasons in the Championship before earning promotion to Super League for the 2020 season. In July 2020, the team withdrew from the remainder of the Super League season due to "overwhelming financial challenges" caused by the COVID-19 pandemic. In November 2020, the Wolfpack's application for readmission to Super League for the 2021 was rejected.

=== Rugby union ===
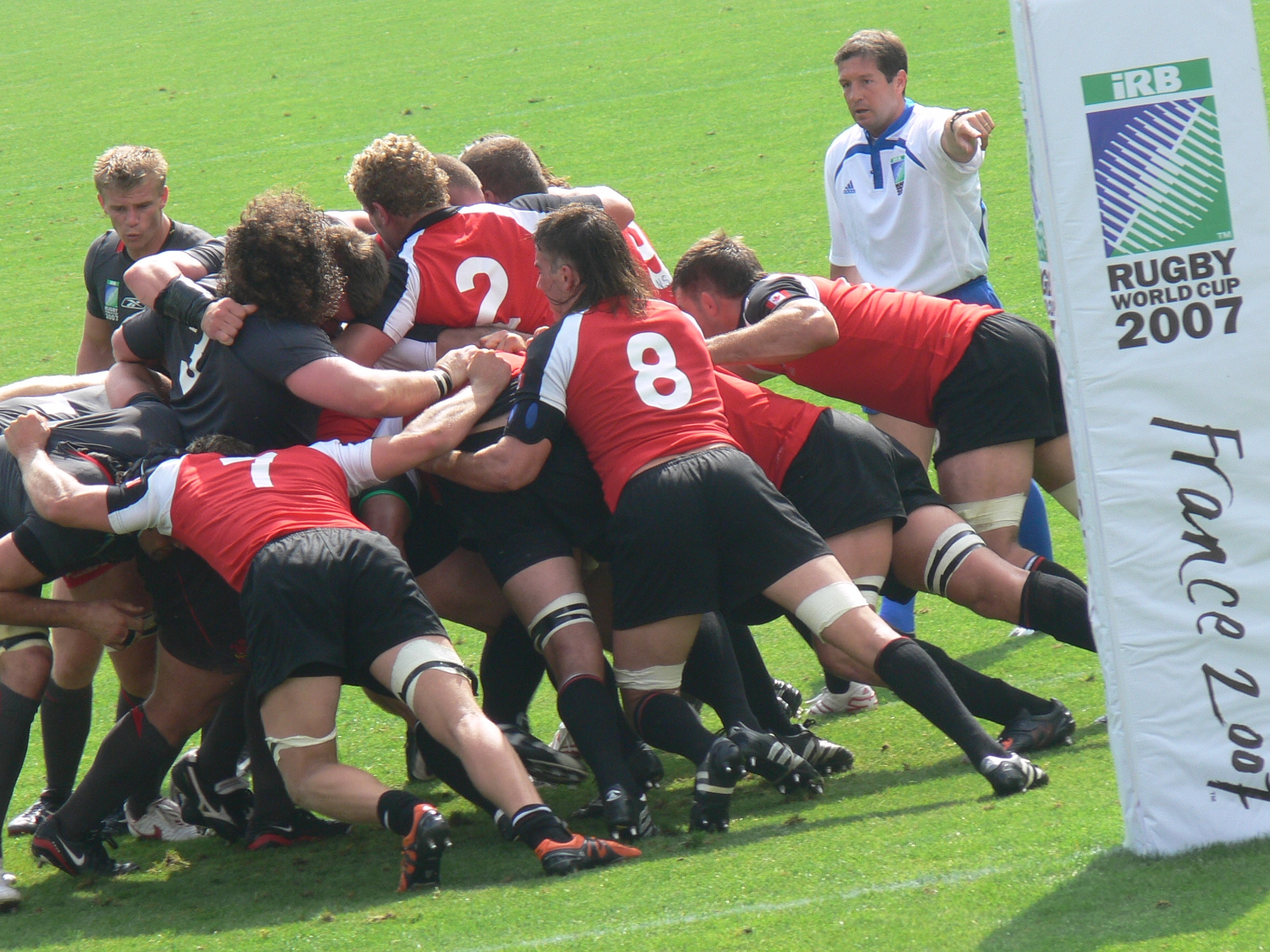
The Canada national rugby union team at the 2007 Rugby World Cup.

Canada has around 13,000 seniors and twice as many junior players spread across the country. Many of these come from Canada's rugby stronghold of British Columbia while also being strong in Newfoundland and Ontario. The Canadian Rugby Championship is the premier domestic rugby union competition since 2009, featuring four regionally based Canadian teams. In 2009, the top two teams advanced to the Americas Rugby Championship, where they faced the A national teams from Argentina and the United States. From 2010 to 2015, the country was represented at the ARC by one team, Canada A. Starting in 2016, the competition was revamped along the lines of Europe's Six Nations Championship and the Southern Hemisphere's Rugby Championship. Since that time, Canada's senior national team has competed in the ARC alongside senior national sides from Brazil, Chile, Uruguay, and the United States, plus Argentina's A national team.

The sport's domestic governing body, Rugby Canada, scrapped its previous national competition, the Rugby Canada Super League, in favour of a new national under-20 league, the Rugby Canada National Junior Championship.

The Canadian national side have competed in every Rugby World Cup to date, yet have only won one match each tournament with the exception of the 1991 tournament where they reached the quarterfinals; the 2007 tournament when their best result was a draw against Japan in the group stage; and the 2019 tournament, when they went winless in their first three group matches and then saw their final match against Namibia cancelled and scored as a draw due to an impending typhoon.

Highlights include famous victories over Scotland and Wales, and until recently frequent wins over their North American neighbours, the United States. However, since 2013, the U.S. has dominated the rivalry, with 11 wins and one draw from the teams' last 12 matches. Known for their trademark "hard nosed" style of play, many Canadian players play their trade professionally in English and French leagues.

The Toronto Arrows professional rugby union club debuted September 2017, and started play in Major League Rugby as of 2019. The Arrows team, an independent off-shoot of the Ontario Blues Rugby Football Club, features mostly Canadian players and staff. The team's home field is York Lions Stadium on the Keele Campus of York University.

== Individual sports ==
=== Bowling ===
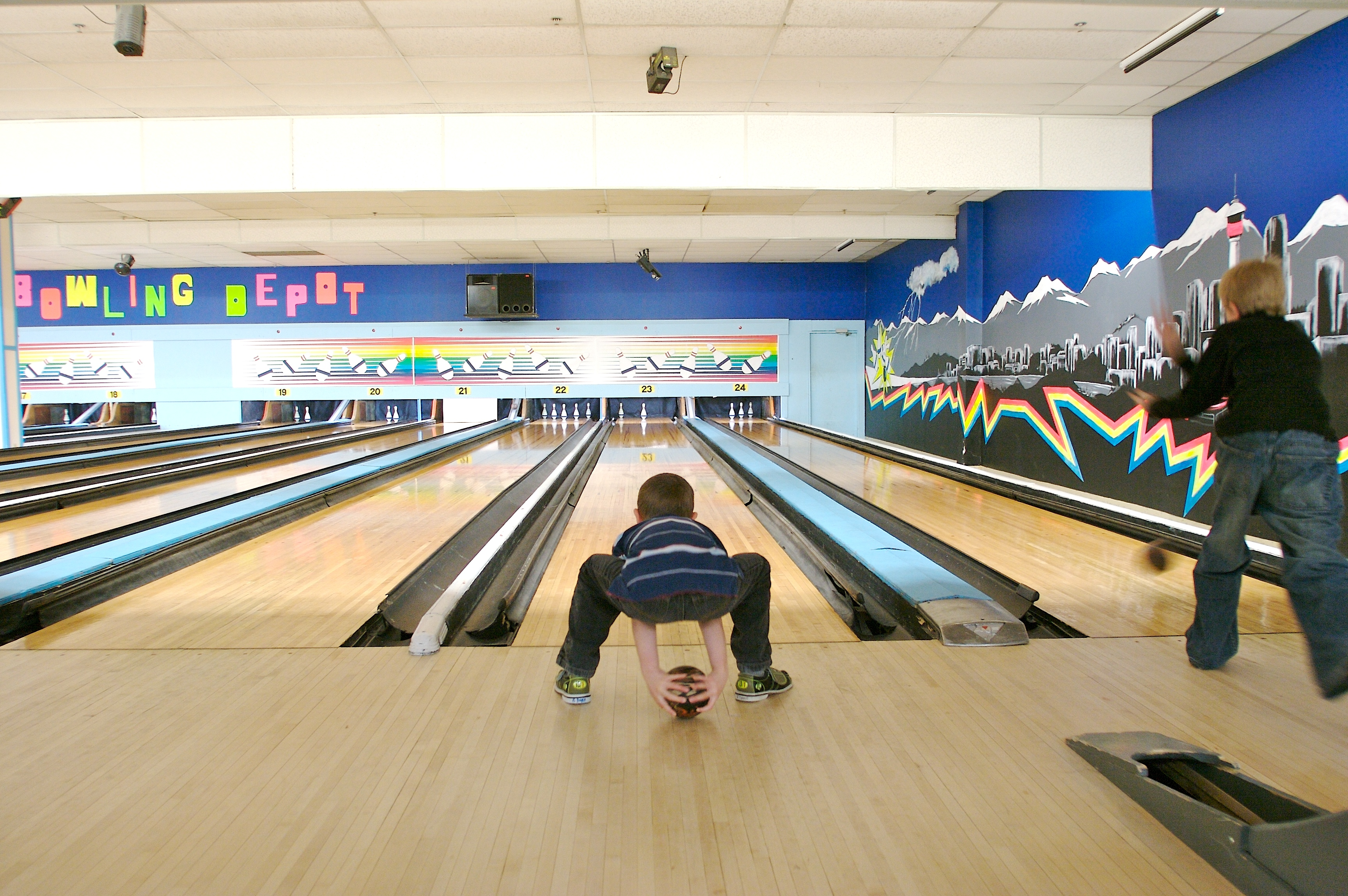
A boy playing five-pin bowling, a bowling variant which is played in Canada.

The sport of bowling takes several forms in Canada, including ten-pin and lawn bowling, but most notably Canada has its own version: Five-pin bowling, which was invented circa 1909 by Thomas F. Ryan in Toronto, Ontario, at his Toronto Bowling Club, in response to customers who complained that the ten-pin game was too strenuous. He cut five tenpins down to about 75% of their size, and used hand-sized hard rubber balls, thus inventing the original version of five-pin bowling. Five-pin is played in all parts of Canada, but not played in any other country. Candlepin bowling, regulated by the International Candlepin Bowling Association in both Canada and the United States, is played at several centres in Nova Scotia and New Brunswick.

In Quebec, a variation of duckpin bowling is played using pins with rubber bands around their widest section, known in French as petites quilles.

=== Combat sports ===
==== Boxing ====
The sport of boxing has been practised in Canada since before Canadian Confederation in 1867. Boxing was illegal in Canada during the bare-knuckle era but fights took place in remote areas and the last of them was in Halifax, Nova Scotia in 1901.

==== Judo ====
The Japanese martial art Judo has been practised in Canada for nearly a century. The first Judo dojo in Canada, Tai Iku Dojo, was established in Vancouver in 1924 by Shigetaka "Steve" Sasaki. Today, an estimated 30,000 Canadians participate in Judo programs in approximately 400 clubs across Canada.

Canadians have won five Olympic medals in Judo since it was added to the Summer games in 1964. Doug Rogers won silver in the +80 kg category in 1964, Mark Berger won bronze in the +95 kg category in 1984, Nicolas Gill won bronze in the 86 kg category in 1992 and silver in the 100 kg category in 2000, and Antoine Valois-Fortier won bronze in the −81 kg category in 2012. The Canadian Judo team trains at the National Training Centre in Montreal under Gill's direction.

==== Mixed martial arts ====
Canada has produced several notable MMA fighters, appearing in the UFC and other promotions. Canada is the home of former UFC Welterweight and Middleweight Champion Georges St-Pierre, former Bellator MMA Welterweight Champion Rory McDonald, as well as PFL 2022 Lightweight Tournament and 2023 Lightweight Tournament Champion Olivier Aubin-Mercier.

==== Wrestling ====
The sport of wrestling has been practiced in Canada for more than a century, with the first amateur wrestling championships being held at Toronto's Argonaut Rowing Club in 1901. The sport continued to grow during the 20th century and by 1969, the Canadian Amateur Wrestling Association was formed. Today the same organization is called Wrestling Canada Lutte, and is the national governing body for Olympic style wrestling in Canada. The organization's purpose is to encourage and develop the widest participation and highest proficiency in Olympic wrestling in Canada.

=== Cycling ===
Cycling in Canada is experienced in various ways across a geographically huge, economically and socially diverse country. Among the reasons for cycling in Canada are for practical reasons such as commuting to work or school, for sports such as road racing, BMX, mountain bike racing, freestyle BMX, as well as for pure recreation. The amount and quality of bicycle infrastructure varies widely across the country as do the laws pertaining to cyclists such as bicycle helmet laws which can differ by province.

=== Golf ===
Golf is a widely enjoyed recreational sport in Canada, and the country boasts several highly rated courses. Golf Canada is the governing organization, and has over 1,600 associated member clubs and over 300,000 individual members. Golf Canada also conducts the only PGA Tour and LPGA Tour events in Canada, and it also manages the Canadian Golf Hall of Fame. PGA Tour Canada (also known as the Canadian Tour), owned and operated by the PGA Tour since late 2012, operates an organization that runs a series of tournaments for professional players. In its first season under PGA Tour operation in 2013, it held a qualifying school in California, and followed it with nine tournaments in Canada. The 2014 season saw significant expansion. Three qualifying schools were held—one in California, another in Florida, and finally in British Columbia. The BC qualifier was followed by a series of 12 tournaments, all in Canada. The top five money-winners on the tour earn full membership in the following season of the PGA Tour's second-level Korn Ferry Tour.

Twenty-eight Canadians have won a total of 83 events on the PGA and LPGA tours, combined. Ontario's Mike Weir won the 2003 Masters Tournament, becoming the first Canadian man to win one of golf's majors. The first Canadian to win any recognized major championship was Sandra Post, winner of the 1968 LPGA Championship. From 1979 through 2000, the du Maurier Classic (now known as the Canadian Women's Open) was one of the LPGA's four majors. The most recent Canadian of either gender to win a major championship was Brooke Henderson, who won the 2016 KPMG Women's PGA Championship and the 2022 Evian Championship.

=== Racket sports ===
==== Tennis ====
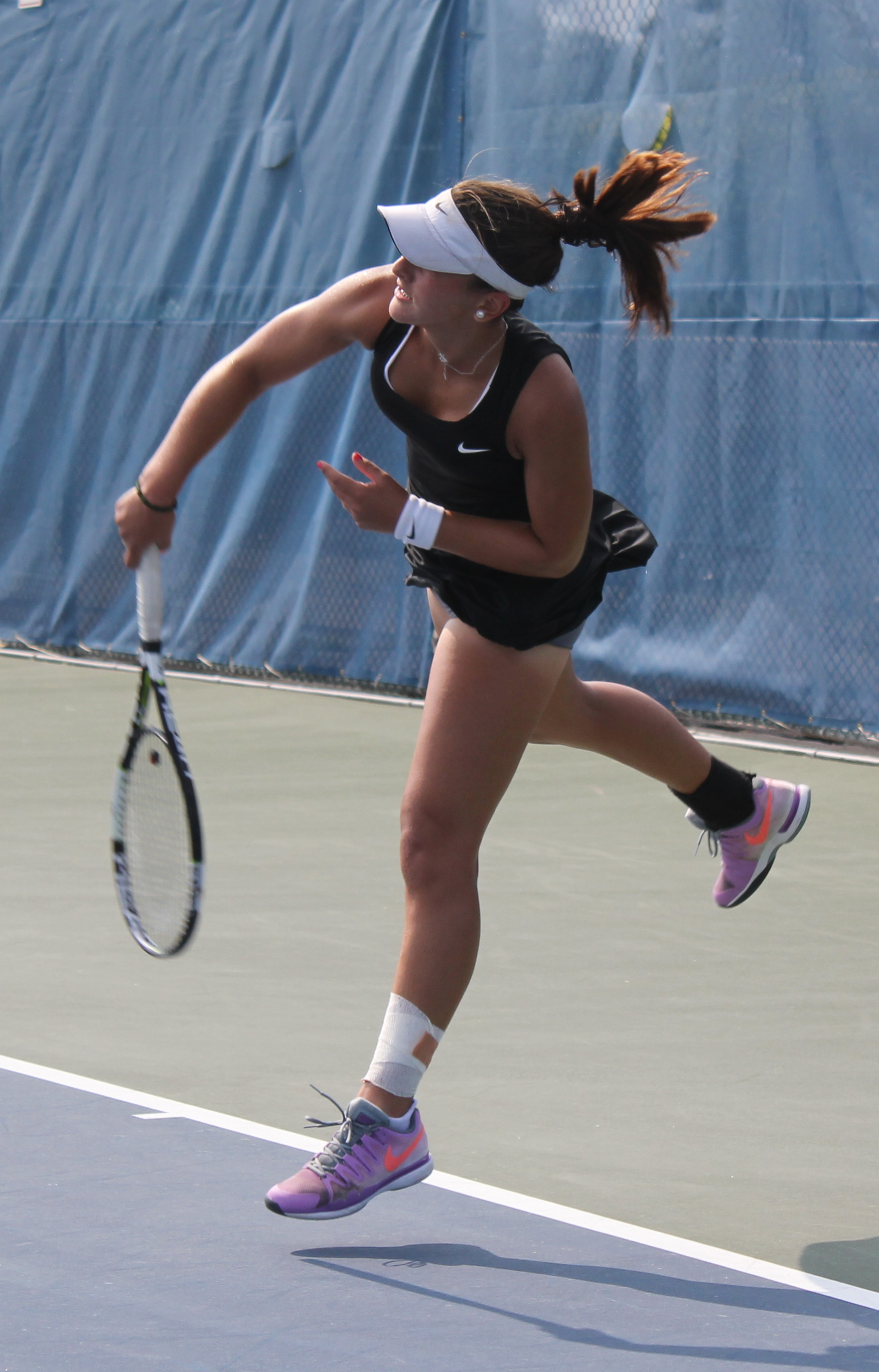
Bianca Andreescu in 2015

While tennis is not a huge sport in Canada, there have been several Canadian players who have had success in the last decade. Milos Raonic is regarded as one of the most successful Canadian male players in history, having the highest ever ranking for a Canadian man at No. 3 ranking as of November 21, 2016. He is the first Canadian male in the Open Era to reach the Australian Open semi-finals (2016), the French Open (2014) quarterfinals, and the Wimbledon final (2016). In women's singles, Eugenie Bouchard became the first Canadian-born player representing Canada to reach the final of a Grand Slam tournament in singles, finishing runner-up to Petra Kvitová at the 2014 Wimbledon Championships. She also reached the semi-finals of the 2014 Australian Open and 2014 French Open. Later in the same year she received the WTA Most Improved Player award for the 2014 season and reached a career-high ranking of No. 5, becoming the first Canadian female tennis player to be ranked in the top 5 in singles.

Canada has also had success in tennis during the late 2010s and into the 2020s with talents such as Denis Shapovalov and Félix Auger-Aliassime. On October 20, 2019, Shapovalov beat Filip Krajinović in the Stockholm Open, winning his first ATP title. Later, during the final event of the year, the Paris Rolex Masters, Shapovalov secured a top 20-year end finish after reaching the semi-finals. He reached the final as well, but lost to Novak Djokovic 6–3 6–4. He finished the season at a career high ranking of number 15. Auger-Aliassime reached a career high ATP singles ranking of No. 6 on November 7, 2022. Auger-Aliassime and Shapovalov were centrepieces of Canada's first Davis Cup-winning team in 2022.

Another notable men's player is Daniel Nestor, born in the former Yugoslavia but raised from early childhood in Toronto, who never broke into the top 50 in singles but was one of the greatest doubles players in history. During his long professional career (1991–2018), he won 91 ATP doubles titles (trailing only the Bryan brothers) and 12 Grand Slam men's doubles events, an Olympic gold medal in men's doubles in 2000 with Sébastien Lareau, and four titles at the ATP Finals. He was also the first men's player to win all Slam and Masters events, the ATP Finals, and an Olympic gold medal.

In recent women's tennis, Bianca Andreescu won the 2019 Rogers Cup in Toronto, where she defeated two current top-ten players in Kiki Bertens and Karolína Plíšková. In the final, Serena Williams experienced back spasms and was forced to retire while down 1–3 in the first set. This gave Bianca her second WTA title, and a new career-high ranking of 14. With the three top-ten wins at the tournament, she won her first seven matches against top-ten opponents. At the US Open, she reached her maiden Grand Slam final, where she defeated Serena Williams, becoming the first Canadian representing Canada to win a Grand Slam singles title.

The largest tennis tournament held in Canada is the Canadian Open, also known as Rogers Cup, and is the second-oldest tournament in all of tennis (behind only Wimbledon). The Canadian Open's men's competition is a Masters 1000 event on the ATP tour. The women's competition is a WTA 1000 event on the Women's Tennis Association (WTA) tour. The competition is played on hard courts. The events alternate from year to year between the cities of Montreal and Toronto. Since 1980 in odd-numbered years the men's tournament is held in Montreal, while the women's tournament is held in Toronto, and vice versa in even-numbered years. Before 2011, they were held during separate weeks in the July–August period; now the two competitions are held during the same week in August. The Toronto tournament is held at the Aviva Centre and the Montreal tournament is held at the IGA Stadium.

==== Pickleball ====
Pickleball, a paddle sport that combines elements of tennis, badminton, and table tennis, was invented in the United States in 1965, on Bainbridge Island, Washington.

=== Motorsport ===
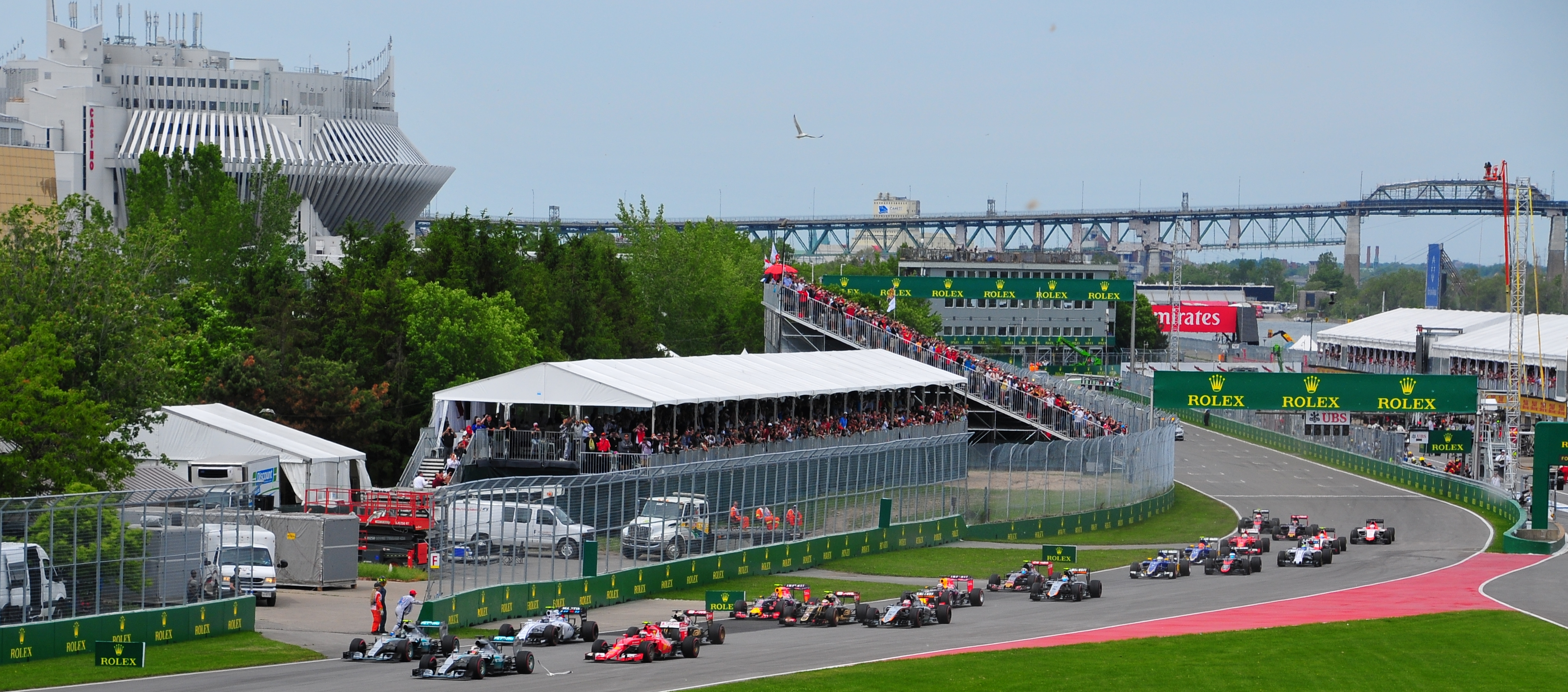
The opening lap of the 2015 Canadian Grand Prix. The auto race has been held since 1967.

The Canadian Grand Prix Formula One auto race had been conducted every year since 1967, and since 1978 had been held at the Circuit Gilles Villeneuve in Montreal, apart from 1987 when a dispute arose between brewers Labatts and Molson over sponsorship, again in 2009 when the race was not on the FIA calendar for one year, and most recently in 2020 and 2021 due to the COVID-19 pandemic. The track was named for Canada's first Grand Prix driver, the late Gilles Villeneuve, whose son, Jacques, won the Formula One World championship in 1997.

Several Canadians have starred in American Championship Car Racing, most notably Jacques Villeneuve, who won the 1995 CART championship and Indianapolis 500 before moving to Formula One, and Paul Tracy, who captured the 2003 CART title and collected 31 race wins. Races were held in Mont-Tremblant and Mosport road courses and on street circuits in Toronto, Montreal, Vancouver and Edmonton. In 2008, Champ Car merged with its long-time rival, the Indy Racing League (since renamed INDYCAR), under the banner of the latter body's top series, the IndyCar Series. The Edmonton race was transferred over to the new series immediately, and the Toronto event was added for 2009.

CASCAR (the Canadian Association for Stock Car Auto Racing) was the country's governing body for amateur and professional stock car racing, and the CASCAR Super Series was the highest-level stock car racing series in the country. In 2006, NASCAR purchased CASCAR and rebranded the Super Series as the NASCAR Canadian Tire Series, now known as the NASCAR Pinty's Series; nevertheless, the series remains Canada's top-level stock car racing circuit. In 2007 the Castrol Canadian Touring Car Championship was formed. Because Canada is NASCAR's largest market outside the United States, NASCAR brought the NAPA Auto Parts 200 Busch Series (now Xfinity Series) race to Circuit Gilles Villeneuve in 2007. The race remained on the schedule until being discontinued after the 2012 season. Beginning the next year, NASCAR brought the Truck Series to Mosport with the Chevrolet Silverado 250.

Canadians have combined to win 53 races in American Championship Car Racing (Including 1 Indianapolis 500), 17 races in Formula 1 and 7 races in NASCAR's top 3 divisions (1 in the Cup Series).

=== Rodeo ===
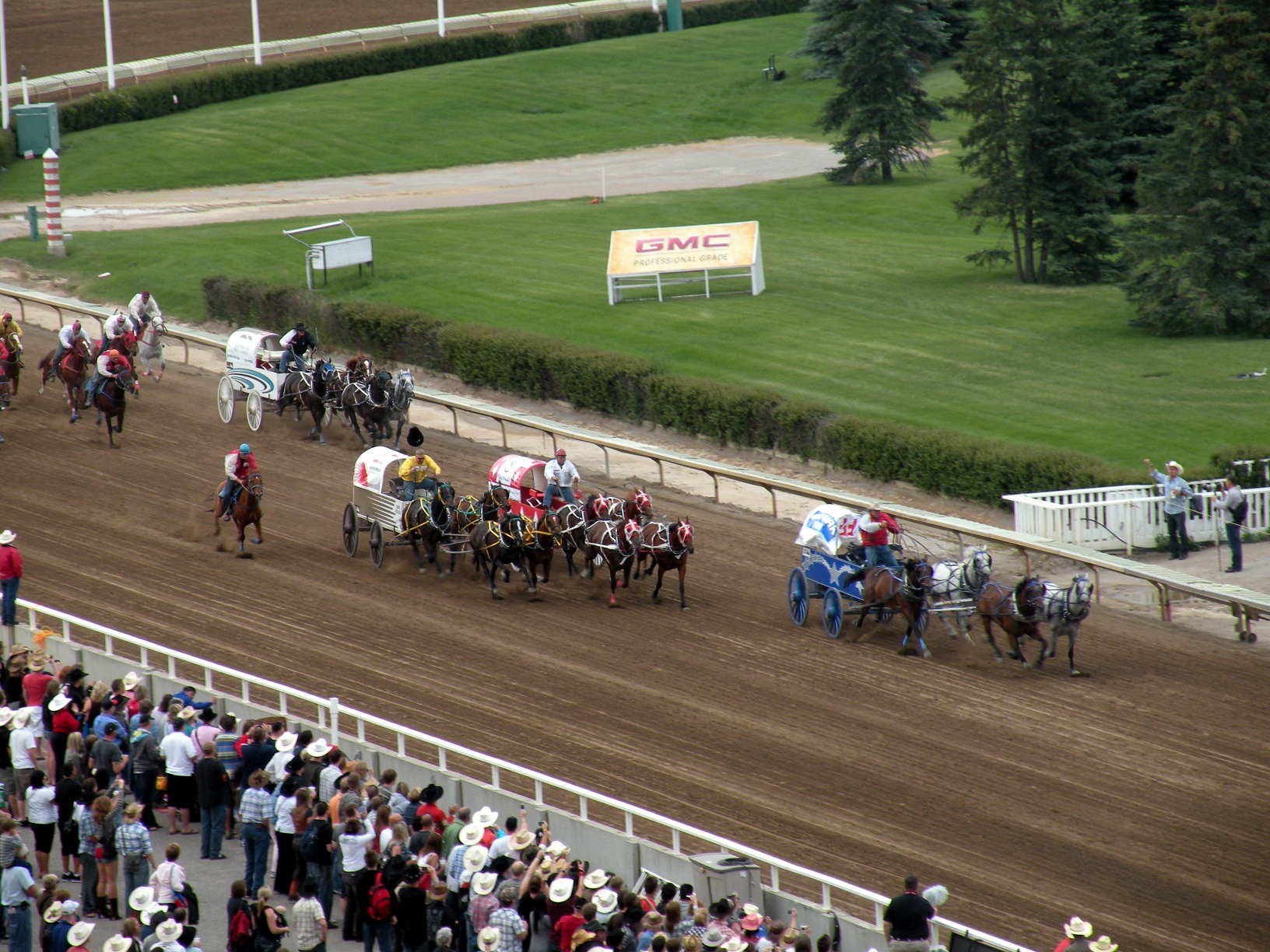
Chuckwagon racing at the 2009 Calgary Stampede

The Canadian Professional Rodeo Association is the governing body that sanctions professional rodeo events in Canada. The most well-known event is at the Calgary Stampede, normally held annually in July, and the Canadian Finals Rodeo, the national championship rodeo, is held in November each year.

=== Shooting sports ===
Shooting sports are a part of Canada's cultural heritage. Many Canadians enjoy participating in the various disciplines that make up this broad sport. In the past decade shooting sports in Canada have seen a major surge of popularity as more and more Canadians are applying for firearms licences.

At the recreational level individuals and families can be found across the nation improving their marksmanship skills at various private and public shooting ranges. Hunting is also a popular activity due to Canada's vast wilderness and pioneer past.

At the competitive level, many Canadians train in Olympic events. There are also a variety of other competitive shooting sports that operate provincially, nationally and internationally through their respective organizations.

== Governance ==
Sport Canada is a branch of the Department of Canadian Heritage that develops federal sport policy in Canada, provides funding programs in support of sport, and administers special projects related to sport. Its mission "to enhance opportunities for all Canadians to participate and excel in sport."

=== University and collegiate sport ===
U Sports is the national governing body for university sports, while the Canadian Collegiate Athletic Association governs college sports. A factor which affects athletic participation levels in U Sports member institutions is the U Sports restriction that scholarships cover tuition only, drawing many of Canada's best student athletes to the United States where organizations such as the National Collegiate Athletic Association (NCAA) allow "full ride" scholarships which include tuition, books, housing, and travel. Another is the popular Canadian Hockey League (for male hockey players aged 15 to 20), which effectively serves as the primary development league for the professional National Hockey League, although CHL teams offer financial support for players who choose to play U Sports hockey after leaving the CHL.

== Amateur sports ==
Canadian athletes are world-ranked in many amateur sports. These include the 'winter' sports of alpine skiing, cross-country skiing, figure skating, freestyle skiing, snowboarding, speed skating, ringette, biathlon, and curling. In ice hockey, Canada supports national teams for both men and women in the under-20 and under-18 categories. In 'summer' sports, Canadians participate in rugby, soccer, disc ultimate, track and field among most sports presented in the Summer Olympics. There are sports federations for most sports in Canada. Funding for amateur athletics is provided by governments, private companies and individual citizens through donation. Organizations like the FANS Foundation additionally provide a pathway for under-18 newcomers for more amateur sports in Canada.

== Media ==
Major television broadcasters of sports in Canada include CBC Television, Télévision de Radio-Canada, The Sports Network (TSN), Réseau des sports (RDS), Sportsnet, and The Score. A consortium led by CTVglobemedia outbid CBC for the broadcast rights to the 2010 Winter Olympics and 2012 Summer Olympics. Major national weekly sports broadcasts include Hockey Night in Canada and Friday Night Football. There are sports radio stations in most major Canadian cities as well as on satellite radio.

== See also ==
- Professional sports in Canada
- List of Canadian sports personalities
  - List of members of Canada's Sports Hall of Fame
  - Canadian Olympic Hall of Fame
- List of indoor arenas in Canada
- List of stadiums in Canada
- ParticipACTION
