= Ski Jumping Canada =

Governing body for ski jumping in Canada

- Sport: Ski Jumping
- Jurisdiction: Ski Jumping in Canada
- Abbreviation: SJC
- Headquarters: Calgary Alberta Canada
- Location: Calgary, AB
- President: Michael Bodnarchuk and Kelly Johansson
- Chairman: Michael Bodnarchuk and Kelly Johansson
- CEO: Drew Edwards
- Men's coach: Igor Cuznar, Uros Balki, Urban Jarc
- Women's coach: Janko Zwitter
- Sponsor: Sport Canada, Canadian Olympic Committee, Own The Podium, Canadian Olympic Foundation, Canadian Snowsports Association, FIS, Karbon, SEIZ, Bracelayer,

Official website
- skijumpingcanada.com
- (Canada)

Ski Jumping Canada is the governing federation for ski jumping in Canada. It is responsible for the governance of all ski jumping competitions in Canada and for the operation of the national team. Canada has competed in ski jumping at the Winter Olympics since 1928.

== Team Canada ==
=== Women's team ===
- Natalie Eilers
- Nicole Maurer
- Abigail Strate
- Alexandria Loutitt

=== Men's team ===
- Mackenzie Boyd-Clowes

== Funding ==
Ski Jumping Canada is funded through partnerships Sport Canada, Canadian Olympic Committee, and the Snow Sports Consortium's key partners - Karbon is the National team's official clothing sponsor, along with Bracelayer Canada and SEIZ.

Sport Canada joined as a funding partner in 2016 after Ski Jumping Canada was recognized through the Sport Funding Accountability Framework. The sport is not currently funded by Own The Podium.

== See also ==
- Canadian Snowboard Federation, Canadian snowboard sports federation
- Canadian Freestyle Ski Association, Canadian freestyle skiing sports federation
- Nordic Combined Ski Canada, Canadian Nordic combined skiing sports federation
- Cross Country Canada, Canadian cross country skiing sports federation
- Alpine Canada, Canadian alpine skiing sports federation
- Biathlon Canada, Canadian biathlon ski-shooting sports federation
- Own the Podium
