= Athlete Assistance Program =

Canadian program for elite athletes

The Athlete Assistance Program (or carding program) is a program where the Government of Canada (through Sport Canada) provides funding assistance to elite level Canadian athletes. Athletes who are receiving this assistance are called carded athletes.

To qualify the athlete has to be one of the top 16 in the world in their sport, or to have the potential of reaching the top 16. Athletes are nominated by their National Sports Organization. Only athletes in sports that are funded by Sport Canada, will be considered.

Monthly funding is provided directly to the athletes and the tuition at a post secondary institution is also paid for. The funding (in 2006 either $900 or $1500 per month) is not intended to cover living expenses, but only to cover some of the additional expenses that elite athletes have for training and competing.
