= Project 119 =

Chinese governmental sports program

Project 119 is a governmental program of the People's Republic of China targeting sports that China has not traditionally excelled in at the Summer Olympics, to maximize the total number of medals and number of golds won during the 2008 Summer Olympics in Beijing, China. The number, 119, refers to the number of gold medals available in events that China is targeting. The total number of golds available in the targeted sports was 122 at the targeted 2008 Olympics, an increase of three.

"Project 119" is related to the Plan for Olympic Glory, a more general plan for greater performance across the board.

== History ==
With the awarding of the Games of the XXIX Olympiad of 2008 to Beijing in 2001, the government of China embarked on a program to increase its medal load. Project 119 was established to gain medals in :Athletics, Swimming, Rowing & Canoe/Kayak and Sailing. These sports had a total gold medal count of 119 in the 2000 Summer Olympics. At those Games, China had only won one medal in all these sports. China wished to finish on top of the medal count and gold medal total at its own games.

For rowing, China established a training centre at Qiandao Lake (lit. 'Thousand Island Lake), 500 km (310 mi) from Shanghai, and hired foreign coaches from around the world.

=== Development ===
Leading up the 2008 target, China harvested several fruits for their labours.

- China acquired four gold medals in the Project 119 sports at the 2004 Olympics.
- China tops the points table at the 2007 Amsterdam World Cup rowing regatta.
- China stunned the UK at the June 2008 World Cup rowing regatta.

=== Target ===
Project 119 failed to live up to billing in the swimming events, resulting in only one gold medal.

Entering with a powerful team in rowing, Project 119 resulted in a single gold medal for the women's quad. The men's eight failed to advance.

=== Legacy ===
The Beijing Olympics ended with China winning the most golds, while finishing second to the United States in total medals. This marked the first time since the 1936 Summer Olympics that neither the United States, nor the Soviet Union/Russia, had won the most gold medals at a Summer Olympics.

China performed well at the London 2012 Games, winning the second largest number of gold medals and in total medal count.

== See also ==
- Own the Podium (Canada)
