= Nordic Combined Ski Canada =

Sports governing body in Canada

Nordic Combined Canada
- Jurisdiction: Nordic Combined Skiing in Canada
- Sponsor: Sport Canada
- (Canada)

Nordic Combined Ski Canada is the governing federation for Nordic Combined in Canada.

== See also ==
- Canadian Snowboard Federation, Canadian snowboard sports federation
- Canadian Freestyle Ski Association, Canadian freestyle skiing sports federation
- Ski Jumping Canada, Canadian ski jumping sports federation
- Cross Country Canada, Canadian cross country skiing sports federation
- Alpine Canada, Canadian alpine skiing sports federation
- Biathlon Canada, Canadian biathlon ski-shooting sports federation
