= Canadian Snowboard Federation =

Governing body for the sport of snowboarding in Canada

Canada Snowboard
- Sport: Snowboard
- Jurisdiction: Snowboarding in Canada
- Founded: 1991
- Headquarters: Vancouver, BC
- President: Tyler King
- Sponsor: Burton, FA Design, Mazda, Sport Chek, Mackenzie Financial, Own The Podium, Sport Canada
- (Canada)

The Canadian Snowboard Federation (also known as "Canada Snowboard") is the governing body in Canada for the sport of snowboarding. It is a member discipline of the Canadian Snowsports Association, and is recognized by the Government of Canada, the Fédération Internationale de Ski, the World Snowboard Federation, the Canadian Olympic Committee, and the Canadian Paralympic Committee. They are a federally incorporated non-profit organization. Canada~Snowboard is governed by a board of directors elected by and from its volunteer membership and manages programs nationally and locally through professional staff, provincial and territorial snowboard associations, and their affiliated clubs.

== Provincial associations ==
- AB - Alberta Snowboarding
- BC - British Columbia Snowboard Association
- MB — Snowboard Association of Manitoba
- NB — New Brunswick Snowboard Association
- NL — Newfoundland Labrador Snowboard Association
- NS - Snowboard Nova Scotia
- NWT — Northwest Territories Snowboard Association
- ON - Snowboard Ontario
- PE — Prince Edward Island Snowboard Association
- QC - Snowboard Quebec
- SK - Saskatchewan Snowboard Association
- YK - Snowboard Yukon

== See also ==
- Alpine Canada, alpine skiing federation
- Canadian Freestyle Ski Association, freestyle skiing federation
- Nordic Combined Ski Canada, Canadian Nordic combined skiing sports federation
- Ski Jumping Canada, Canadian ski jumping sports federation
- Cross Country Canada, Canadian cross country skiing sports federation
- Biathlon Canada, Canadian biathlon ski-shooting sports federation
