= Nordiq Canada =

Governing federation for cross-country skiing in Canada

- Sport: Cross-country skiing
- Jurisdiction: Cross-country skiing in Canada
- Abbreviation: NC
- Founded: 1969
- President: Jennifer Tomlinson
- Sponsor: Sport Canada
- (Canada)

Nordiq Canada is the governing federation for cross-country skiing in Canada.

== History ==
The first governing body for cross-country skiing in Canada was the Canadian Amateur Skiers Association (CASA), founded in 1920. This body covered all disciplines of skiing; alpine, cross-country, and jumping. CASA changed to Canadian Skiers Association (CSA) and in 1969 cross-country skiing separated from the CSA, becoming its own discipline. Biathlon was part of the CCC for 9 years until it left and formed its own governing body. The CCC remains Canada's governing body for cross-country skiing.

In 2019, Cross Country Ski de Fond Canada officially rebranded and is now known as Nordiq Canada.

== See also ==
- Canadian Snowboard Federation, Canadian snowboard sports federation
- Canadian Freestyle Ski Association, Canadian freestyle skiing sports federation
- Nordic Combined Ski Canada, Canadian Nordic combined skiing sports federation
- Ski Jumping Canada, Canadian ski jumping sports federation
- Alpine Canada, Canadian alpine skiing sports federation
- Biathlon Canada, Canadian biathlon ski-shooting sports federation
