= Canadian Freestyle Ski Association =

Governing federation for freestyle skiing in Canada

Freestyle Canada
- Sport: Freestyle Skiing
- Jurisdiction: Freestyle Skiing in Canada
- Founded: May 1, 1975
- Regional affiliation: Canada
- President: Peter Judge
- Chairman: Larry Bilton
- Sponsor: Sport Canada

Official website
- www.freestylecanada.ski
- (Canada)

Canadian Freestyle Ski Association is the governing federation for freestyle skiing in Canada.

The Association was established in 1975, and there are now well over 50 freestyle ski clubs across the country.

== See also ==
- Canadian Snowboard Federation, Canadian snowboard sports federation
- Nordic Combined Ski Canada, Canadian Nordic combined skiing sports federation
- Ski Jumping Canada, Canadian ski jumping sports federation
- Cross Country Canada, Canadian cross country skiing sports federation
- Alpine Canada, Canadian alpine skiing sports federation
- Biathlon Canada, Canadian biathlon ski-shooting sports federation
