= Biathlon Canada =

Sports governing body in Canada

- Sport: Biathlon
- Jurisdiction: Biathlon in Canada
- Founded: 1985
- Headquarters: Canmore
- President: Lyle McLeod
- CEO: Ken Davies (acting)
- Coach: Matthias Ahrens
- Sponsor: Sport Canada

Official website
- biathloncanada.ca
- (Canada)

Biathlon Canada is the governing federation for biathlon in Canada.

== See also ==
- Canadian Snowboard Federation, Canadian snowboard sports federation
- Canadian Freestyle Ski Association, Canadian freestyle skiing sports federation
- Nordic Combined Ski Canada, Canadian Nordic combined skiing sports federation
- Ski Jumping Canada, Canadian ski jumping sports federation
- Cross Country Canada, Canadian cross country skiing sports federation
- Alpine Canada, Canadian alpine skiing sports federation
