= Bobsleigh Canada Skeleton =

Canadian bobsleigh and skeleton federation

- Sport: Bobsleigh, Skeleton
- Jurisdiction: Bobsleigh in Canada, Skeleton in Canada
- Founded: 1986
- Headquarters: Calgary
- Location: Calgary
- President: Sarah C. Storey
- CEO: Jon Jackson
- Sponsor: Sport Canada

Official website
- bobsleigh.ca
- (Canada)

Bobsleigh Canada Skeleton (BCS) is the official federation for bobsleigh and skeleton in Canada. It serves as the Canadian representative for the International Bobsleigh and Skeleton Federation and is part of the Canadian Olympic Committee.

BCS is headquartered in Calgary, Alberta, at Canada Olympic Park.
