= Sport Canada =

Canadian government agency

Agency overview
- Formed: 1971
- Type: Canadian sports system
- Jurisdiction: Government of Canada
- Headquarters: Gatineau, QC
- Minister responsible: Marc Miller, Minister of Canadian Identity and Culture
- Agency executive: Vicki Walker, Director General
- Parent department: Canadian Heritage
- Key documents: National Sports of Canada Act (1994); Physical Activity and Sport Act (2003)
- Website: Official website

Sport Canada is a branch of the Department of Canadian Heritage that develops federal sport policy in Canada, provides funding programs in support of sport, and administers special projects related to sport. Its mission "to enhance opportunities for all Canadians to participate and excel in sport."

The Government of Canada, through Sport Canada, provides financial support through 3 programs: Athlete Assistance Program, which gives direct financial support to selected national team athletes (CA$33 million/year); the Sport Support Program, which funds Canadian sports organizations (about $178.8 million/year); and the Hosting Program, which helps sport organizations to host the Canada Games and international sport events (about $21.6 million/year). Sport Canada special projects include research projects; projects aimed at increasing participation in sport; the Long-Term Athlete Development Model; and Podium Canada, consisting of the Own the Podium and Road to Excellence programs, aimed at improving Canada's performance at the Olympic Games and Paralympic Games.

== History ==
In 1961, the Fitness and Amateur Sport Act came into force, whereby the Government of Canada made an official commitment to “encourage, promote and develop fitness and amateur sport in Canada.” Under this act, the now-defunct Department of National Health and Welfare, through its new Fitness and Amateur Sport Program, was responsible for making grants to any organization that carried out activities in the field of fitness or amateur sport. A few years later, the Canadian government created two new directorates: Recreation Canada, which was tasked with improving the lifestyle of Canadians, and Sport Canada, which was responsible for developing competitive sport.

The Dubin inquiry proved to be a seminal event in Sport Canada's history, in the wake of the Ben Johnson doping scandal and national embarrassment.

Jean Charest was Minister of Fitness and Amateur Sport for a time during the Mulroney government, and he intended with his 1989 "Towards the Year 2000" policy statement "to elevate Canada to one of the top three positions in the world in the area of sport."

Sport Canada controlled in 1991 sixty-five "national sport organizations" (NSOs), as the "pivotal agency in each category of sport in Canada". These NSOs were "incorporated non-profit agencies recognized by the federal government and eligible for federal financing through the Fitness and Amateur Sport Directorate."

In the early 1990s, the role of the Fitness and Amateur Sport Program was split between the Department of Canadian Heritage, which would be responsible for Sport Canada from then onward, and the Department of Health. The Department of Canadian Heritage was initially created by Prime Minister Kim Campbell from parts of several other federal departments, combining amateur sport with a number of other departments.

Sport Canada has since remained under the auspices of Canadian Heritage, while Health Canada continues its mandate of "encourag[ing] Canadians to take an active role in their health, such as increasing their level of physical activity and eating well."

For much of its existence, responsibility for Sport Canada was given to a junior Cabinet Minister reporting to the Minister of Canadian Heritage. In 2015 with the advent of the government of Justin Trudeau, Sport Canada became the responsibility of the Minister of Sport and Persons with Disabilities, a full Cabinet position that would eventually cease to be filled as of 2019.

== Funding ==
The Government of Canada is involved in sport primarily through programs and policies administered by the Department of Canadian Heritage. Pursuant to section 4(2)(f) of the Department of Canadian Heritage Act, the department is tasked with "the encouragement, promotion and development of sport."

There are three major sport funding programs that are run by Sport Canada which "provide financial assistance to our high-performance athletes, advance the objectives of the Canadian Sport Policy, and help Canadian organizations host sport events that create opportunities for Canadians to compete at the national and international level."

- Athlete Assistance Program (AAP) — The AAP has a goal of providing funds to athletes throughout their training and preparations before and during National and International Games. Funding provided by the APP can be granted to Canadian athletes who meet the proper eligibility requirements. It is recommended for athletes who request the assistance of the AAP to live and train within the country, however, as long as the request is justified by the National Sport Organization, an exception may be granted for certain Canadian athletes to receive funding from the AAP.
- Sport Support Program (SSP) — distributes funding to national sport organizations (NSOs), national multisport service organizations (MSOs), Canadian sport centres, and other non-governmental organizations that provide direct services and programs for athletes, coaches, and other sport participants. Funding is provided to eligible organizations for programming that is aligned with the goals of the Canadian Sport Policy.
- Hosting Program — supports the hosting and organization of national and international sporting events in Canada, enhancing "the international profile" of Canadian sport organizations as well as delivering "economic, social and cultural benefits to Canadian communities." This program is distributed through four sectors: International Major Multisport Games (Summer and Winter Olympic & Paralympic Games; Commonwealth Games, and Pan and Parapan American Games, etc.); International Single Sport Events; International Multisport Games for Aboriginal Peoples and Persons with a Disability; and Canada Games, which are the largest Canadian games.

== Sport organizations ==
The Government of Canada, through Sport Canada, invests funds and hard work into national level athletes and sporting events through the Sport Support Program (SSP). In order to provide "a role in supporting amateur sport or in promoting an active and healthy lifestyle for Canadians," Sport Canada provides help to three major types of sport organizations: National Sport Organizations (NSOs), National Multisport Service Organizations (MSOs), and Canadian Sport Centres and Institutes.

=== National Sport Organizations ===
National Sport Organizations (NSOs), or National Sport Federations (NSFs), are governing bodies that represent a specific national sport in Canada. Each NSO has a duty to oversee all that impacts its national sport, it selects and manages the yearly team roster and provides "professional development for coaches and officials in their sport." There are currently 58 NSOs in Canada.

NSOs funded by Sport Canada
| Organization | Sport |
|---|---|
| Alpine Canada | Alpine skiing |
| Archery Canada | Archery |
| Athletics Canada | Athletics (track & field) |
| Badminton Canada | Badminton |
| Baseball Canada | Baseball |
| Biathlon Canada | Biathlon |
| Bobsleigh Canada Skeleton | Bobsleigh and skeleton |
| Boccia Canada | Boccia |
| Boxing Canada | Boxing |
| Bowling Federation of Canada | Bowling (5- & 10-pin) |
| Bowls Canada Boulingrin | Lawn bowls |
| Canada Basketball | Basketball |
| Canada Snowboard | Snowboarding |
| Canada Artistic Swimming | Artistic swimming |
| Canadian Blind Sports | Goalball |
| Canadian Broomball Federation | Broomball |
| Canadian Fencing Federation | Fencing |
| Canadian Freestyle Ski Association | Freestyle skiing |
| Canadian Soccer Association | Soccer |
| Canadian Weightlifting Federation | Weightlifting |
| CanoeKayak Canada | Canoeing and kayaking |
| Climbing Escalade Canada | Competition Climbing and Paraclimbing |
| Cricket Canada | Cricket |
| Cross-Country Canada | Cross-country skiing |
| Curling Canada | Curling |
| Cycling Canada | Cycling |
| Diving Plongeon Canada | Diving |
| Equine Canada | Equestrian |
| Field Hockey Canada | Field hockey |
| Football Canada | Football |
| Golf Canada | Golf |
| Gymnastics Canada | Gymnastics |
| Hockey Canada | Ice hockey |
| Judo Canada | Judo |
| Karate Canada | Karate |
| Lacrosse Canada | Lacrosse |
| Luge Canada | Luge |
| Racquetball Canada | Racquetball |
| Ringette Canada | Ringette |
| Rowing Canada | Rowing |
| Rugby Canada | Rugby union |
| Sail Canada | Sailing |
| Shooting Federation of Canada | Shooting |
| Skate Canada | Figure skating |
| Softball Canada | Softball |
| Speed Skating Canada | Speed skating |
| Squash Canada | Squash |
| Swimming Canada | Swimming |
| Table Tennis Canada | Table tennis |
| Taekwondo Association of Canada | Taekwondo |
| Tennis Canada | Tennis |
| Triathlon Canada | Triathlon |
| Volleyball Canada | Volleyball |
| Water Polo Canada | Water polo |
| Water Ski and Wakeboard Canada | Water skiing and wakeboarding |
| Wheelchair Basketball Canada | Wheelchair basketball |
| Wheelchair Rugby Canada | Wheelchair rugby |
| Wrestling Canada Lutte | Wrestling |

=== National Multisport Service Organizations ===
National Multisport Service Organizations (MSOs) are organizations that focus on coordination, executing and conveying amenities to the sport community in Canada. These MSOs provide learning opportunities for Canadian coaches, and "support for Aboriginal peoples in sport and national coordination for the North American Indigenous Games (NAIG)," as well as focusing on promotion to increase Canadian participation in sport, among other things. There are currently 24 MSOs that are granted funding from Sport Canada to date.

MSOs funded by Sport Canada
| Organization | Area of concern |
|---|---|
| AthletesCAN | all Canadian national team athletes (including Aboriginal, Olympic, Paralympic, Pan and Parapan American, and Commonwealth Games) |
| Aboriginal Sport Circle | Indigenous athletes |
| Canada Games Council | Canada Games |
| Canadian Women & Sport (formerly Canadian Association for the Advancement of Women and Sport and Physical Activity) | Women and girls in sport and physical activity |
| Canadian Centre for Ethics in Sport | ethics in sport, including anti-doping |
| Canadian Collegiate Athletic Association | college athletics |
| Canadian Deaf Sports Association | deaf and hard-of-hearing athletes |
| Canadian Fitness and Lifestyle Research Institute | advocacy for physical activity and sport |
| Canadian Olympic Committee | Canada's involvement in the Olympic movement |
| Canadian Paralympic Committee | Canadian Paralympic athletes (for the Paralympic and Parapan American Games) |
| Canadian Tire Jumpstart Charities | financially-disadvantaged children in organized sport and recreation |
| Coaching Association of Canada | coaches |
| Commonwealth Games Canada | Commonwealth Games and Commonwealth Sport Movement in Canada |
| Grand défi Pierre Lavoie | advocacy for healthy life habits in young people |
| KidSport | kids (under 18) in sport |
| Motivate Canada | advocacy for healthy life habits in young people |
| Own the Podium | technical support for national sport organizations |
| ParticipACTION | advocacy for physical activity and sport |
| Physical and Health Education Canada | advocacy for physical education and healthy life habits in young people |
| Special Olympics Canada | Canadian athletes with intellectual disabilities |
| Sport Dispute Resolution Centre of Canada | dispute resolution |
| Sport for Life | physical literacy and long-term athlete development |
| Sport Information Resource Centre | sport education |
| U Sports | Canadian university sport |

=== Canadian Sport Institutes and Centres ===
Canadian Sport Institutes and Centres were developed in partnership between Sport Canada, the Canadian Olympic Committee (COC), the Coaching Association of Canada (CAC), and the provincial governments. The Canadian Olympic and Paralympic Sport Institute (COPSI) Network is a group of designated multisport training centres established in Canada recognized by Sport Canada and Own the Podium, and supported by national and provincial partners in partnership with 7 different provinces or regions across Canada.

There are 4 Canadian Sport Institutes (located in Calgary, Quebec, Ontario, and the Pacific Region), and 3 Canadian Sport Centres (located in Manitoba, Saskatchewan, and Atlantic Canada). These organizations not only provide training facilities for Canadian athletes but also promote innovation, sport science, sport medicine and coaching within Canada.

The COPSI Network "supports the development of high performance sport in Canada through a network of training environments as well as through collaboration with National Sport Organization, national partners, provincial and local governments as well as the private sector to provide more opportunities for high performance athletes and coaches."

Organizations funded by Sport Canada
| Organization | Province/region | Location (Building/complex) |
|---|---|---|
| Canadian Sport Institute Calgary | Alberta | Calgary |
| Canadian Sport Institute Ontario | Ontario | Scarborough (Toronto Pan Am Sports Centre) |
| Canadian Sport Institute Ontario | Ontario | Milton (Mattamy National Cycling Centre) |
| Canadian Sport Institute Ontario | Ontario | London (National Training Centre of Rowing Canada) |
| Canadian Sport Institute Ontario | Ontario | Toronto (Athletics Canada's East Hub at York University) |
| Canadian Sport Institute Pacific | Pacific Canada | Vancouver |
| Canadian Sport Institute Pacific | Pacific Canada | Victoria (Pacific Institute for Sport Excellence) |
| Canadian Sport Institute Pacific | Pacific Canada | Whistler (Whistler Athletes’ Centre) |
| Institut national du sport du Québec | Quebec | Montreal (Olympic Park) |
| Canadian Sport Centre Atlantic | Atlantic Canada | Halifax, NS (Canada Games Centre) |
| Canadian Sport Centre Atlantic | Atlantic Canada | Fredericton, NB (U of New Brunswick Faculty of Kinesiology) |
| Canadian Sport Centre Atlantic | Atlantic Canada | Newfoundland and Labrador |
| Canadian Sport Centre Atlantic | Atlantic Canada | Wolfville, NS (Acadia Athletics Complex) |
| Canadian Sport Centre Atlantic | Atlantic Canada | Antigonish, NS (St Francis Xavier University) |
| Canadian Sport Centre Manitoba | Manitoba | Winnipeg (Frank Kennedy Centre, U of Manitoba) |
| Canadian Sport Centre Saskatchewan | Saskatchewan | Regina |
| Canadian Sport Centre Saskatchewan | Saskatchewan | Saskatoon |

== Notable people ==
- Earl Dawson, regional director of Sport Canada and secretary of the Canada Games council (1971–1987)
- Lou Lefaive, national director of Sport Canada (1971–1974, 1978–1980)

== See also ==
- Sports in Canada
