= Canadian Luge Association =

Luge governing federation in Canada

- Jurisdiction: Luge in Canada
- Sponsor: Sport Canada

Official website
- www.luge.ca
- (Canada)

The Canadian Luge Association is the governing federation for luge in Canada.

The Canadian Luge Association is an independent, non-profit national governing body for luge. It works with government agency Sport Canada and has hosted international events in 2012 and 2013.

In 2009, the Canadian Luge Association raised awareness of its sponsorship needs with "for sale" decals on helmets during its World Cup season; the campaign resulted in a million-dollar sponsorship deal over five years, covering participation in two Winter Olympics.
