= Alpine Canada =

Canadian governing body for skiing

Alpine Canada Canada Alpin
- Sport: Alpine skiing
- Jurisdiction: Alpine skiing in Canada
- Founded: 1920
- President: Thérèse Brisson
- CEO: Thérèse Brisson
- Sponsor: Sport Canada

Official website
- alpinecanada.org
- (Canada)

Alpine Canada (French: Canada Alpin) is the national governing body for alpine, para-alpine and ski cross racing in Canada. Alpine Canada represents coaches, officials, supporters and athletes, including the racers of the Canadian Alpine Ski Team, Canadian Ski Cross Team and the Canadian Para-Alpine Ski Team. Alpine Canada is also involved in promoting participation within Canada's four million recreational skiers. Alpine Canada celebrated 100 years of ski racing in Canada in 2021.

== Organization ==
Alpine Canada was registered with the Canadian Revenue Agency as a Canadian Amateur Athletic Association (RCAAA); therefore, they can issue official donation receipts and have been eligible to receive gifts from registered charities since 1992-04-01.

== Canadian Alpine Ski Team ==
The Canadian Alpine Ski Team comprises athletes whose focus is to compete at the World Cup, World Championship and Olympic levels. Both men and women operate as separate national teams each with respective coaching staff.

Athletes on the team compete in a range of disciplines, some competing in technical, some in speed, and a few in both. Alpine Canada's rich history of champions dates back to the 1950s, as athletes on today's teams continue to chase the podium. To date, Canadian alpine athletes have earned more than 90 World Cup, World Championship and Olympic medals.

== Canadian Para-Alpine Ski Team ==
The Para-Alpine ski team comprises both female and male athletes in three main classification categories: visually impaired, standing and sitting. Para-alpine athletes compete in five core disciplines, (Slalom, giant slalom, super-G, and Downhill). Para-alpine skiing is governed by the International Paralympic Committee (IPC) through the International Paralympic Alpine Skiing Committee (IPCAS).

Canada is known as a dominating team on the international stage in all categories, and the team continues to collect medals and do the country proud at World Cups, World Championships and Paralympic Games.

== Canadian Ski Cross Team ==
The Canadian Ski Cross Team is the newest addition to the Alpine Canada family joining the organization in 2010. The Canadian Ski Cross Team is made up of men and women who compete in heats. Four athletes race head to head down the course, with the top two from each heat advancing to the next round.

== See also ==
- Canadian Alpine Ski Championships
- Crazy Canucks
- Canadian Snowboard Federation, Canadian snowboard sports federation
- Canadian Freestyle Ski Association, Canadian freestyle skiing sports federation
- Nordic Combined Ski Canada, Canadian Nordic combined skiing sports federation
- Ski Jumping Canada, Canadian ski jumping sports federation
- Cross Country Canada, Canadian cross country skiing sports federation
- Biathlon Canada, Canadian biathlon ski-shooting sports federation
