= History of cricket =

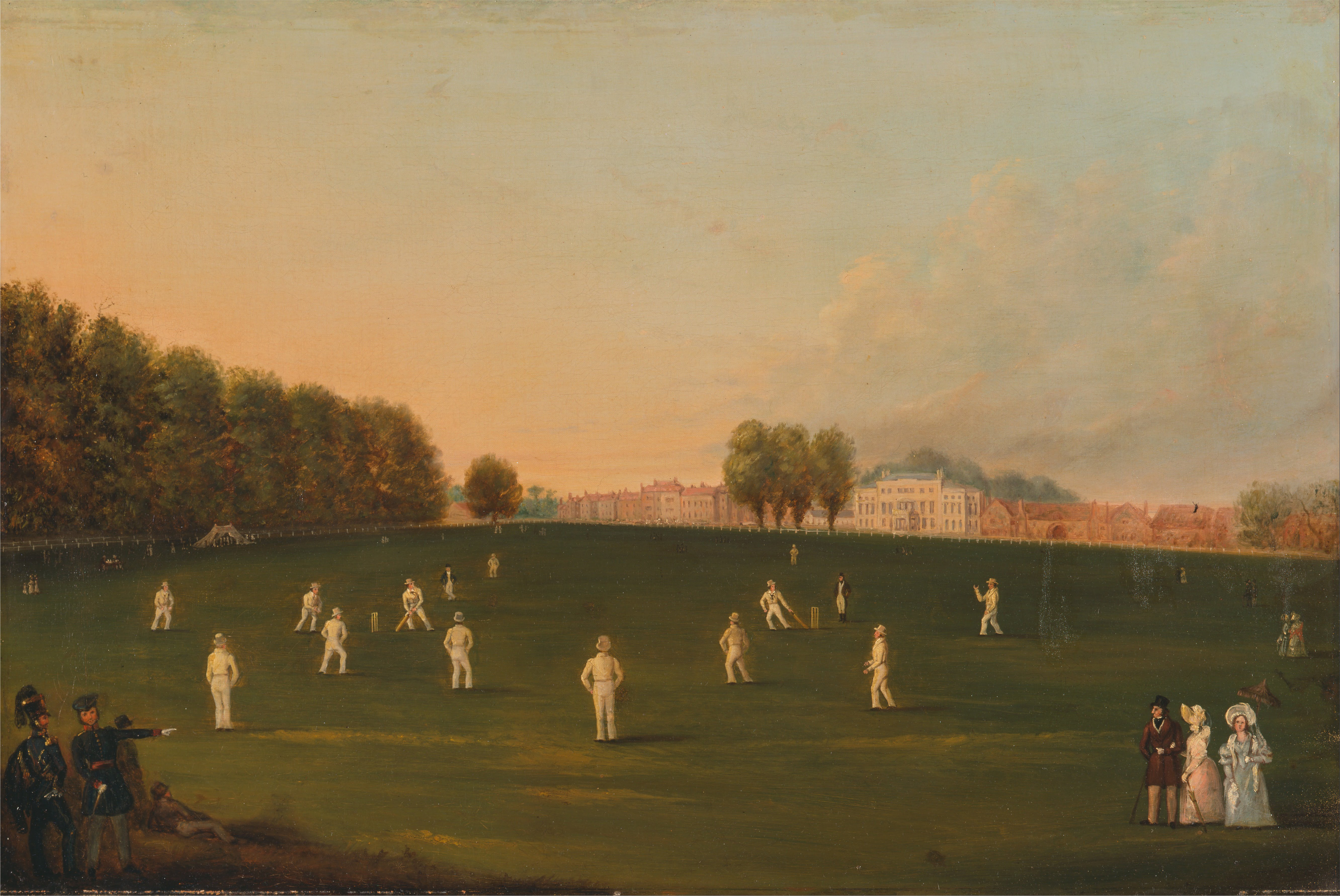
First Grand Match of Cricket Played by Members of the Royal Amateur Society on Hampton Court Green, August 3rd, 1836

The sport of cricket has a known history beginning in the late 16th century England. It became an established sport in the country in the 18th century and developed globally in the 19th and 20th centuries. International matches have been played since the 19th-century and formal Test cricket matches are considered to date from 1877. Cricket is the world's second most popular spectator sport, after association football (soccer).

Cricket is governed by the International Cricket Council (ICC), which has over one hundred countries and territories in membership, though only twelve currently play Test cricket.

The game's rules are defined in the "Laws of cricket". The game has various formats, ranging from T-10 (Ten-10) played in around 90 minutes to Test matches, which can last up to five days.

== Early cricket ==
=== Origin ===
Cricket was created during Saxon or Norman times by children living in the Weald, an area of dense woodlands and clearings in south-east England that lies across Kent and Sussex. The first definite written reference is from the end of the 16th century.

There have been several speculations about the game's origins, including some that it was created in France or Flanders. The earliest of these speculative references is from 1300 and concerns the future King Edward II playing at "creag and other games" in both Westminster and Newenden. It has been suggested that "creag" was an Old English word for cricket, but expert opinion is that it was an early spelling of "craic", meaning "fun and games in general".

It is generally believed that cricket survived as a children's game for many generations before it was increasingly taken up by adults around the beginning of the 17th century. Possibly cricket was derived from bowls, assuming bowls is the older sport, by the intervention of a batsman trying to stop the ball from reaching its target by hitting it away. Playing on sheep-grazed land or in clearings, the original implements may have been a matted lump of sheep's wool (or even a stone or a small lump of wood) as the ball; a stick or a crook or another farm tool as the bat; and a stool or a tree stump or a gate (e.g., a wicket gate) as the wicket.

=== First definite reference ===
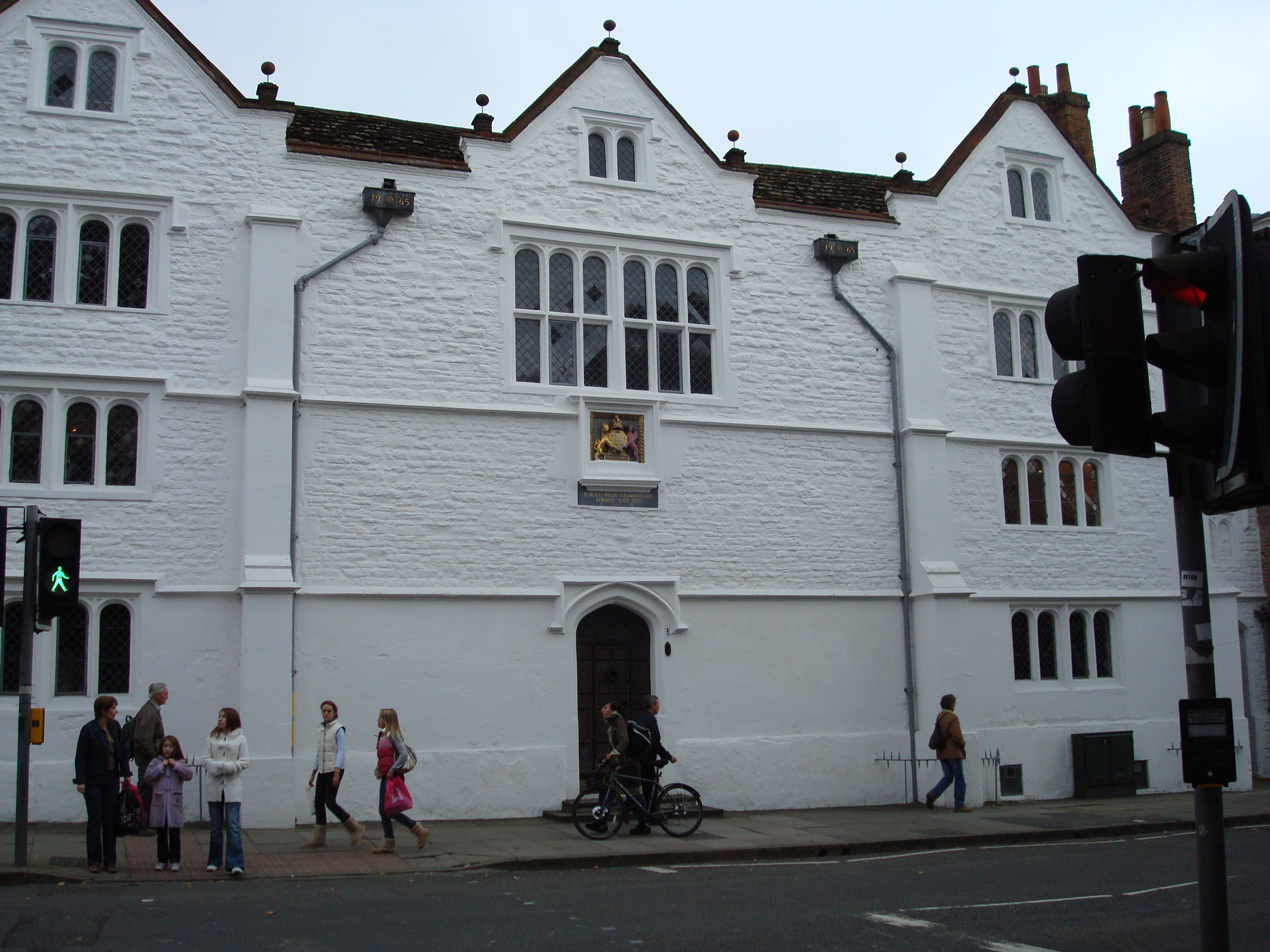
John Derrick was a pupil at the Royal Grammar School, then the Free School, in Guildford when he and his friends played creckett circa 1550.

In 1598, a court case in England concerning an ownership dispute over a plot of common land in Guildford, Surrey, mentions the game of creckett. A 59-year-old coroner, John Derrick, testified that he and his school friends had played creckett on the site fifty years earlier when they attended the Free School. Derrick's account proves beyond reasonable doubt that the game was being played in Surrey circa 1550, and is the earliest universally accepted reference to the game.

The first reference to cricket being played as an adult sport was in 1611, when two men in Sussex were prosecuted for playing cricket on Sunday instead of going to church. In the same year, a dictionary defined cricket as a boys' game, and this suggests that adult participation was a recent development. In an account of a case brought before the King's Bench in 1640, it is recorded that a cricket match "between the Weald & Upland" took place "about 30 yeares [sic]" previously.

=== Derivation of the name of "cricket" ===
A number of words are thought to be possible sources for the term "cricket". In the earliest definite reference, it was spelled creckett. The name may have been derived from the Middle Dutch krick(-e), meaning a stick; or the Old English cricc or cryce meaning a crutch or staff, or the French word criquet meaning a wooden post. The Middle Dutch word krickstoel means a long low stool used for kneeling in church; this resembled the long low wicket with two stumps used in early cricket. According to Heiner Gillmeister, a European language expert of the University of Bonn, "cricket" derives from the Middle Dutch phrase for hockey, met de (krik ket)sen (i.e., "with the stick chase").

It is more likely that the terminology of cricket was based on words in use in south-east England at the time and, given trade connections with the County of Flanders, especially in the 15th century when it belonged to the Duchy of Burgundy, many Middle Dutch words found their way into southern English dialects.

=== The Commonwealth ===
After the Civil War ended in 1648, the new Puritan government clamped down on "unlawful assemblies", in particular the more raucous sports such as football. Their laws also demanded a stricter observance of the Sabbath than there had been previously. As the Sabbath was the only free time available to the lower classes, cricket's popularity may have waned during the Commonwealth. However, it did flourish in public fee-paying schools such as Winchester and St Paul's. There is no actual evidence that Oliver Cromwell's regime banned cricket specifically and there are references to it during the interregnum that suggest it was acceptable to the authorities provided that it did not cause any "breach of the Sabbath". It is believed that the nobility in general adopted cricket at this time through involvement in village games.

=== Gambling and press coverage ===
Cricket thrived after the Restoration in 1660 and is believed to have first attracted gamblers making large bets at this time. It is possible, as believed by some historians, that top-class matches began. In 1664, the "Cavalier" Parliament passed the Gaming Act 1664 which limited stakes to £100, although that was still a fortune at the time, equivalent to about £18,000 in present-day terms. Cricket had become a significant gambling sport by the end of the 17th century, as evidenced in 1697 by a newspaper report of a "great match" played in Sussex which was 11-a-side and played for high stakes of 50 guineas a side.

With freedom of the press having been granted in 1696, cricket for the first time could be reported in the newspapers. But it was a long time before the newspaper industry adapted sufficiently to provide frequent, comprehensive, coverage. During the first half of the 18th century, press reports tended to focus on the betting rather than the play.

== 18th-century cricket ==
=== Patronage and players ===
Gambling introduced the first patrons because some of the gamblers decided to strengthen their bets by forming their own teams and it is believed the first "county teams" were formed in the aftermath of the Restoration in 1660, especially as members of the nobility were employing "local experts" from village cricket as the earliest professionals. The first known game in which the teams use county names is in 1709, but these types of fixtures were being arranged long before then. The match in 1697 was probably Sussex versus another county.

The most notable of the early patrons were a group of aristocrats and businessmen who were active from about 1725, which is the time that press coverage became more regular, perhaps as a result of the patrons' influence. These men included the 2nd Duke of Richmond, Sir William Gage, Alan Brodrick and Edwin Stead. For the first time, the press mentions individual players like Thomas Waymark.

=== Cricket expands beyond England ===
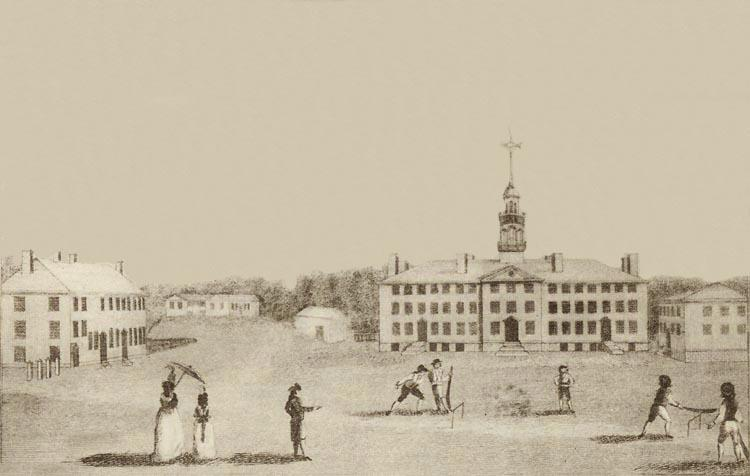
A 1793 American depiction of "wicket" being played in front of Dartmouth College. Wicket likely came to North America in the late 17th century.

Cricket was introduced to North America via the English colonies in the 17th century, probably before it had even reached the north of England. In the 18th century it arrived in other parts of the globe. It was introduced to the West Indies by colonists and to the Indian subcontinent by East India Company mariners in the first half of the century. It arrived in Australia almost as soon as colonisation began in 1788. New Zealand and South Africa followed in the early years of the 19th century.

Cricket never caught on in Canada, despite efforts by the upper class to promote the game as a way of identifying with the "mother country". Canada, unlike Australia and the West Indies, witnessed a continual decline in the popularity of the game during 1860 to 1960. Linked in the public consciousness to an upper-class sport, the game never became popular with the general public. In the summer season it had to compete with baseball. During the First World War, Canadian units stationed in France played baseball instead of cricket.

=== Development of the Laws ===
It's not clear when the basic rules of cricket such as bat and ball, the wicket, pitch dimensions, overs, how out, etc. were originally formulated. In 1728, the Duke of Richmond and Alan Brodick drew up Articles of Agreement to determine the code of practice in a particular game and this became a common feature, especially around payment of stake money and distributing the winnings given the importance of gambling.

In 1744, the Laws of Cricket were codified for the first time and then amended in 1774, when innovations such as lbw, middle stump and maximum bat width were added. These laws stated that "the principals shall choose from amongst the gentlemen present two umpires who shall absolutely decide all disputes". The codes were drawn up by the so-called "Star and Garter Club" whose members ultimately founded the Marylebone Cricket Club at Lord's in 1787. The MCC immediately became the custodian of the Laws and has made periodic revisions and recodifications subsequently.

=== Continued growth in England ===
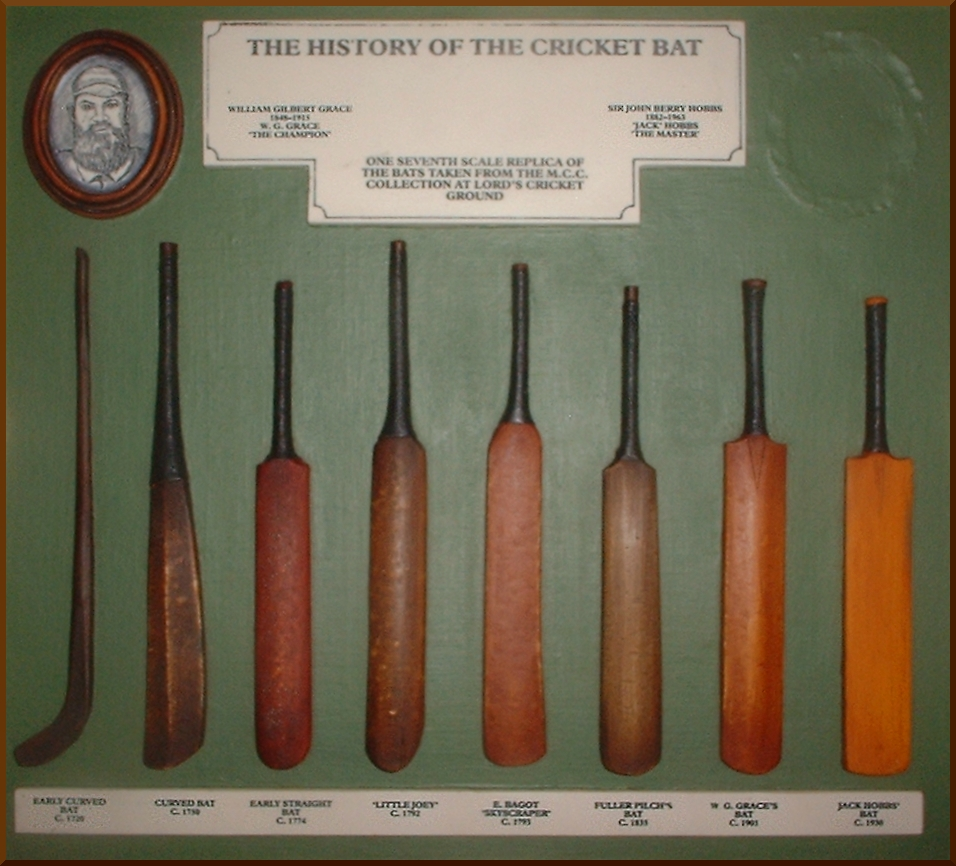
An artwork depicting the history of the cricket bat

The game continued to spread throughout England, and, in 1751, Yorkshire is first mentioned as a venue. The original form of bowling (i.e., rolling the ball along the ground as in bowls) was superseded sometime after 1760 when bowlers began to pitch the ball and study variations in line, length and pace. Scorecards began to be kept on a regular basis from 1772; since then, an increasingly clear picture has emerged of the sport's development.

The first famous clubs were London and Dartford in the early 18th century. London played its matches on the Artillery Ground, which still exists. Others followed, particularly Slindon in Sussex, which was backed by the Duke of Richmond and featured the star player Richard Newland. There were other prominent clubs at Maidenhead, Hornchurch, Maidstone, Sevenoaks, Bromley, Addington, Hadlow and Chertsey.

But far and away the most famous of the early clubs was Hambledon in Hampshire. It started as a parish organisation that first achieved prominence in 1756. The club itself was founded in the 1760s and was well patronised to the extent that it was the focal point of the game for about thirty years until the formation of MCC and the opening of Lord's Cricket Ground in 1787. Hambledon produced several outstanding players including the master batsman John Small and the first great fast bowler Thomas Brett. Their most notable opponent was the Chertsey and Surrey bowler Edward "Lumpy" Stevens, who is believed to have been the main proponent of the flighted delivery.

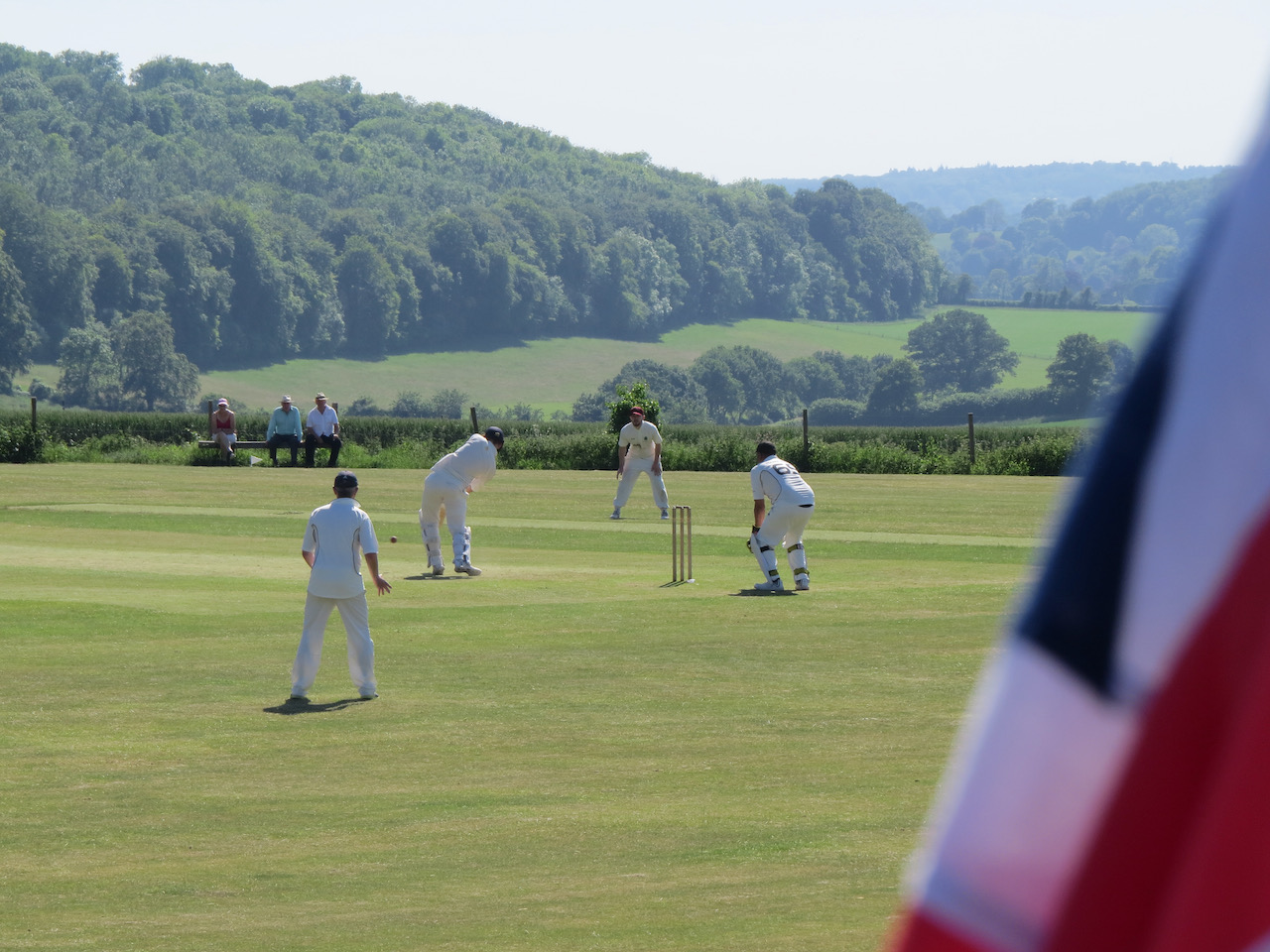
Broadhalfpenny Down, the location of the first First Class match in 1772, is still played on today.

It was in answer to the flighted, or pitched, delivery that the straight bat was introduced. The old "hockey stick"–style of bat was only really effective against the ball being trundled or skimmed along the ground.

First-class cricket began in 1772. Three surviving scorecards exist of 1772 matches organised by the Hambledon Club which commence a continuous statistical record. Those three matches were all between a Hampshire XI and an England XI, the first played at Broadhalfpenny Down on 24 and 25 June. The two leading online archives begin their first-class coverage with this match which is numbered "first-class no. 1" by ESPNcricinfo and "f1" by CricketArchive. Broadhalfpenny Down continued in regular use by Hambledon/Hampshire teams until 1781.

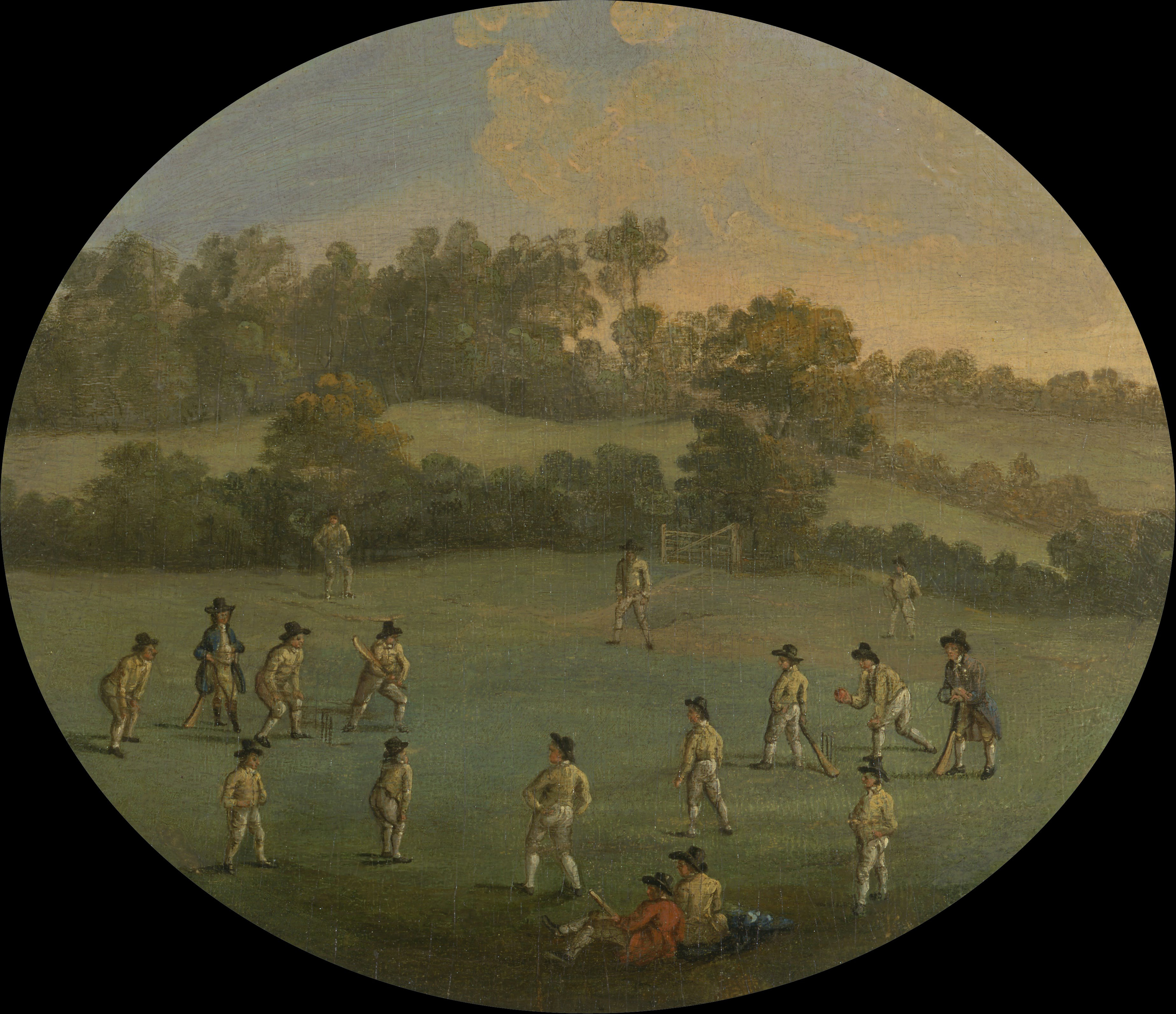
A Game of Cricket at The Royal Academy Club in Marylebone Fields, now Regent's Park, depiction by unknown artist, c. 1790–1799

== 19th-century cricket ==
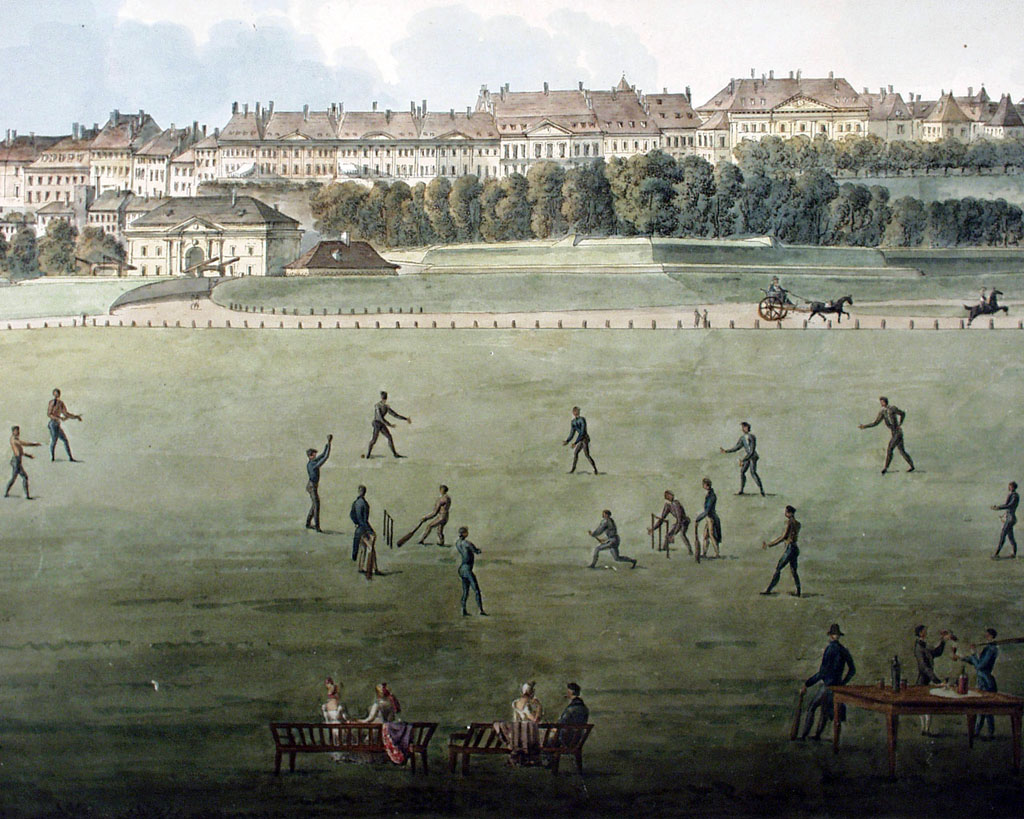
View of Geneva's Plaine de Plainpalais with cricketers, 1817

The game also underwent a fundamental change of organisation with the formation for the first time of county clubs. All the modern county clubs, starting with Sussex in 1839, were founded during the 19th century. No sooner had the first county clubs established themselves than they faced what amounted to "player action" as William Clarke created the travelling All-England Eleven in 1846. Though a commercial venture, this team did much to popularise the game in districts which had never previously been visited by high-class cricketers. Other similar teams were created and this vogue lasted for about thirty years. But the counties and MCC prevailed.

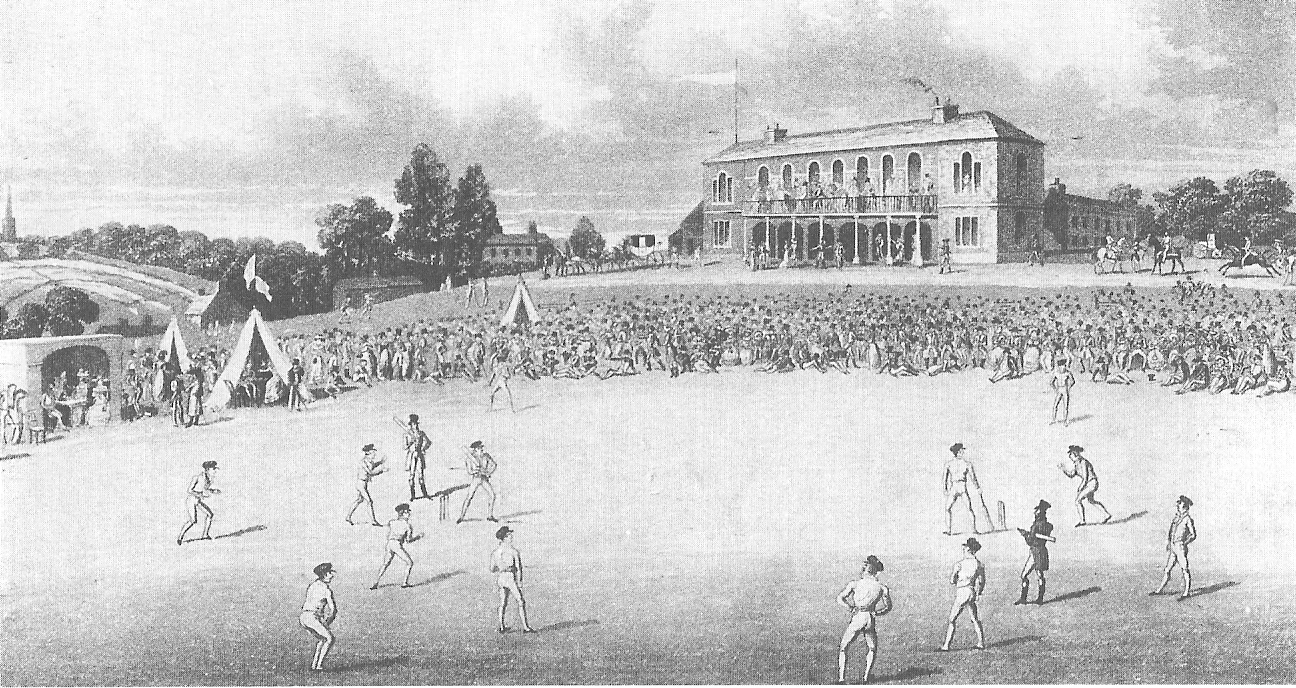
A cricket match at Darnall, Sheffield, in the 1820s.

The growth of cricket in the mid and late 19th century was assisted by the development of the railway network. For the first time, teams from a long distance apart could play one other without a prohibitively time-consuming journey. Spectators could travel longer distances to matches, increasing the size of crowds. Army units around the Empire had time on their hands, and encouraged the locals so they could have some entertaining competition. Most of the Empire embraced cricket, with the exception of Canada.

In 1864, another bowling revolution resulted in the legalisation of overarm and in the same year Wisden Cricketers' Almanack was first published. W. G. Grace began his long and influential career at this time, his feats doing much to increase cricket's popularity. He introduced technical innovations which revolutionised the game, particularly in batting.

=== International cricket begins ===
The first international cricket game took place between what were essentially club teams, from the United States and Canada, in 1844. The match was played at the grounds of the St George's Cricket Club in New York.

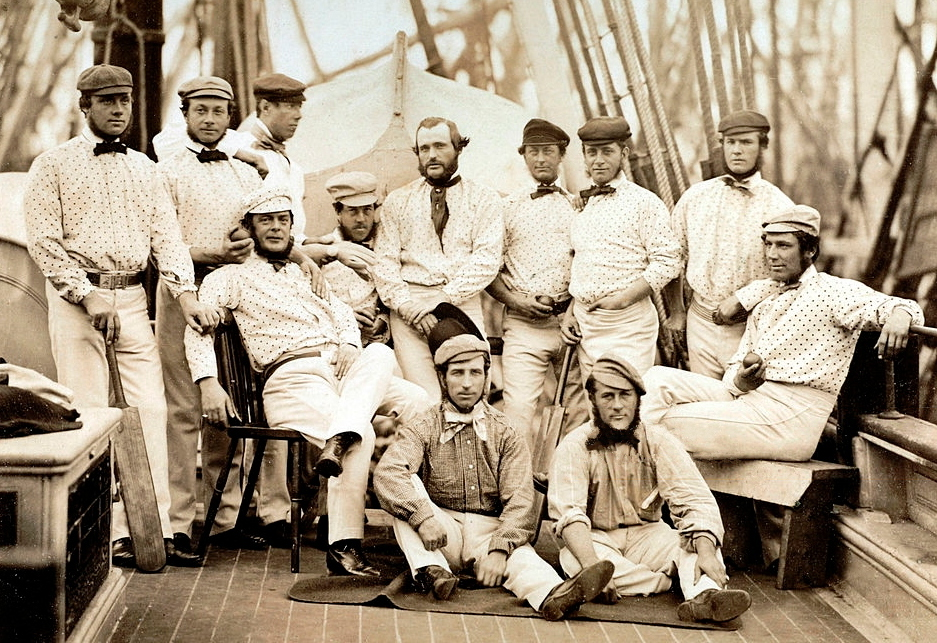
The English team 1859 on their way to the US

In 1859, a team of leading English professionals set off to North America on the first-ever overseas tour and, in 1862, the first English team toured Australia. Between May and October 1868, a team of Aboriginal Australians toured England in what was the first Australian cricket team to travel overseas.

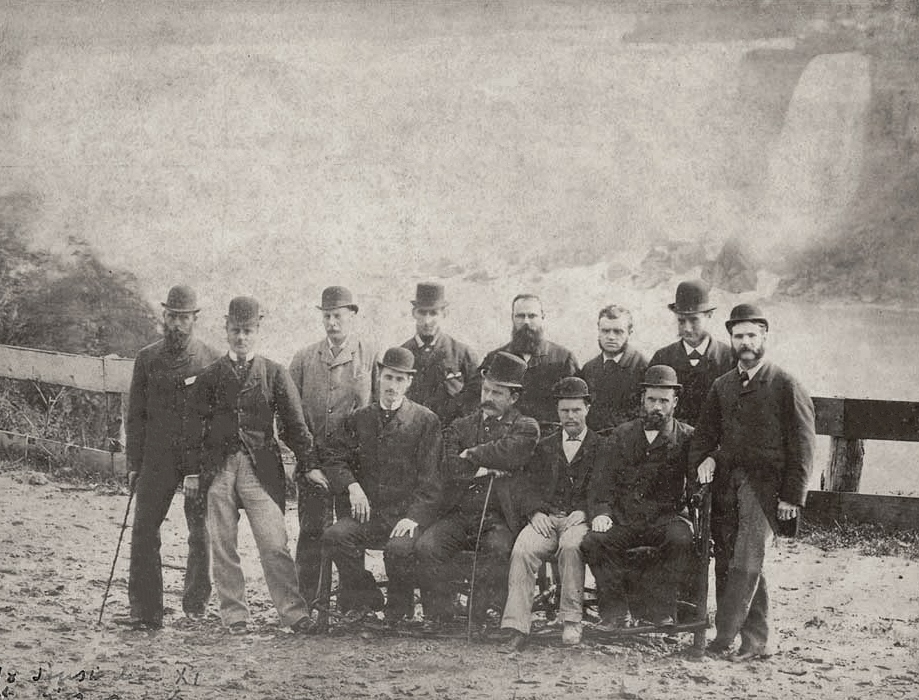
The first Australian touring team (1878) pictured at Niagara Falls

In 1877, an England touring team in Australia played two matches against full Australian XIs that are now regarded as the inaugural Test matches. The following year, the Australians toured England for the first time and the success of this tour ensured a popular demand for similar ventures in future. No Tests were played in 1878 but more soon followed and, at The Oval in 1882, the Australian victory in a tense finish gave rise to The Ashes.

South Africa became the third Test nation in 1889.

=== Decline in baseball-playing countries ===
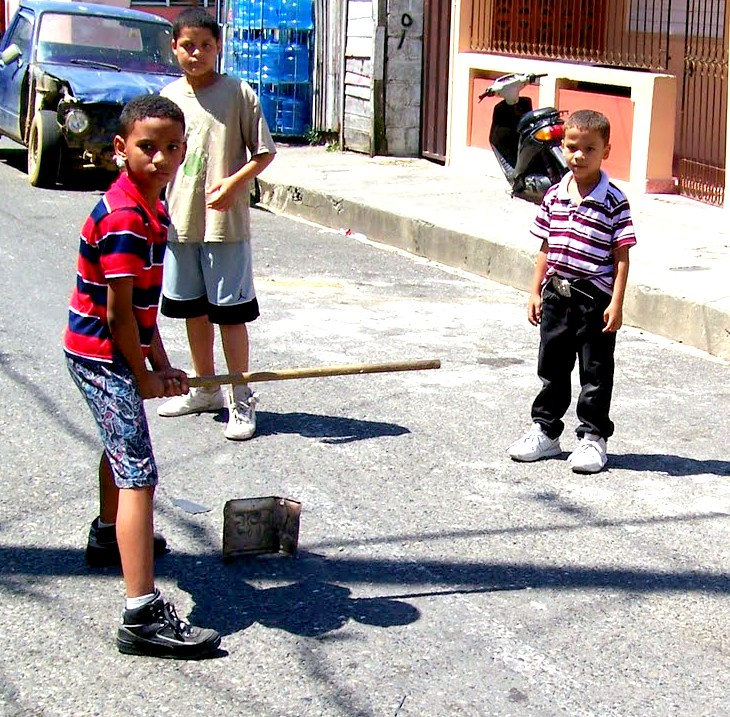
Plaquita, a Dominican street version of cricket. The Dominican Republic was first introduced to cricket through mid-18th century British contact, but switched to baseball after the 1916 American occupation.

Cricket started off as one of the most popular sports in the United States, aided by the invention of informal cricket variants such as wicket which resulted in higher-scoring matches that could be completed in an afternoon, rather than over the course of a few days. However, baseball overtook cricket's popularity in the United States during the American Civil War, as soldiers who had played baseball during the war went back to their homes across the country and took the game with them. Some factors in favour of baseball's rise were that it had a much shorter playing duration and that it could be played on any patch of land (rather than requiring special preparations such as the cricket pitch), which was essential for troops who needed to be able to move at a moment's notice during the war. William Humber argues that there was also less of a social taboo against playing baseball in the New World than in England, despite the game having initially been low in popularity in both places due to cricket having been perceived as the more appropriate sport for adults. The same factors that favored baseball's rise in the United States then saw the sport overtake cricket in Japan, with growing American influence in the Pacific Rim also playing a role.

Cricket came to Latin America in the 19th century, as part of a broader significant British presence in the region at the time. However, the sport was concentrated amongst expatriates and elites as opposed to being spread among the broader population, which limited its growth. By the 20th century, the growing influence of America eventually meant that baseball became the more popular bat-and-ball sport in the Caribbean, while World War I resulted in British expatriates returning to Britain to fight, drying up the support base for the game in Mexico.

=== Growth in the colonies ===
Cricket rose to prominence in Britain during a period where the British Empire became the largest empire in the world. British colonial authorities often collaborated with native elites, who were encouraged to adopt British cultural traditions such as cricket, which during the 19th century was promoted as an emblematic element of Victorian masculinity. Throughout the British empire, cricket was included as part of the physical activities which students at colonial schools engaged in. For the colonial subjects of the British Empire, cricket grew in popularity for a variety of reasons. For native elites, playing the sport was a method of anglicising themselves, while for anti-colonial nationalists, playing cricket provided a venue for them to counter emasculating colonial stereotypes.

=== National championships ===
A significant development in domestic cricket occurred in 1890 when the official County Championship was constituted in England. Soon afterwards, in May 1894, the sport's first-class standard was officially defined. This organisational initiative has been repeated in other countries. Australia established the Sheffield Shield in 1892–93. Other national competitions to be established were the Currie Cup in South Africa, the Plunket Shield in New Zealand and the Ranji Trophy in India. The ICC re-defined first-class status in 1947 as a global concept.

The period from 1890 to the outbreak of the First World War has become one of nostalgia, ostensibly because the teams played cricket according to "the spirit of the game", but more realistically because it was a peacetime period that was shattered by the First World War. The era has been called The Golden Age of cricket and it featured numerous great names such as Grace, Wilfred Rhodes, C. B. Fry, Ranjitsinhji and Victor Trumper.

=== Balls per over ===
During most of the 19th-century standard overs were made up of four deliveries. In 1889 five-ball overs were introduced in first-class cricket, with a move to generally use six-ball overs in 1900.

In the 20th century, eight-ball overs were used at times in a number of countries, primarily Australia, where eight-balls were the standard over length between 1918/19 and 1978/79, South Africa and New Zealand. Since the 1979/80 Australian and New Zealand seasons, six balls per over have been used worldwide, and the most recent version of the Laws only permits six-ball overs.

== 20th-century cricket ==
=== Growth of international cricket ===
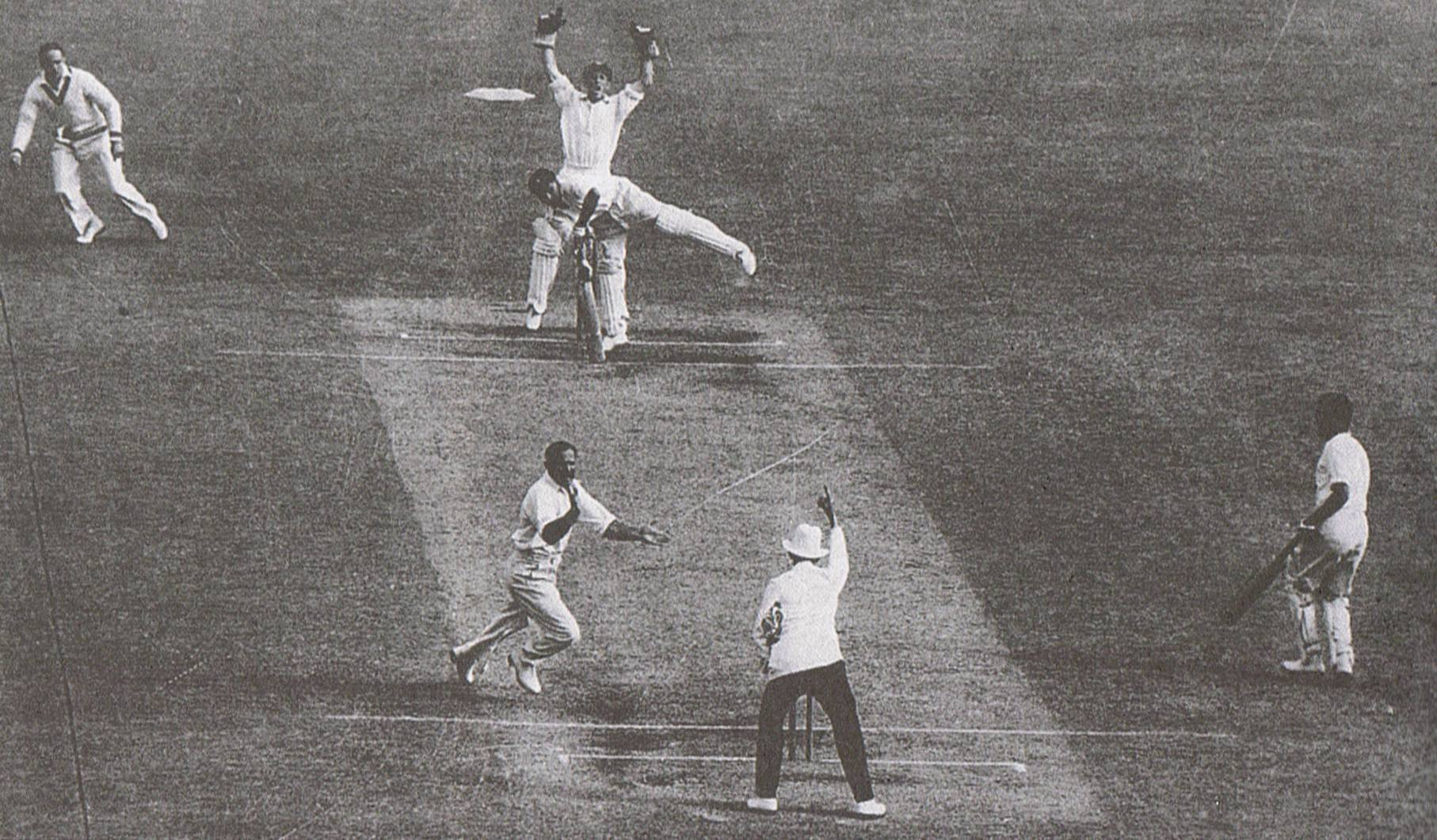
Sid Barnes traps Lala Amarnath lbw in the Test between Australia and India at the MCG in 1948.

Cricket was introduced to various colonies around the world. The Imperial Cricket Conference (ICC) was founded in 1909 with England, Australia and South Africa as the founding members. The ICC included the Marylebone Cricket club, the Australian Board of Control for International Cricket, and the South African Cricket Association as its original associations. The conference aimed to regulate international cricket among three nations, which were considered to be of equal status at the time.

In 1926, both New Zealand and the West Indies were admitted as members, allowing them to play Test cricket against the other teams. However, at this time in the West Indies, cricket was primarily dominated by the white population. Originally, the ICC was not interested in broadening the international popularity of cricket. The organization was reluctant to invite non-commonwealth nations to play. New Zealand was restricted to play three-day test matches. New Zealand and India both became Test playing nations before World War II and Pakistan joined soon afterwards in 1952.

At the initial suggestion of Pakistan, the ICC was expanded to include non-Test playing countries from 1965, with Associate members being admitted. At the same time the organisation changed its name to the International Cricket Conference. The first limited-overs World Cups were played during the 1970s and Sri Lanka became the first Associate member to be raised to Test playing status in 1982. Because the ICC was predominantly a Western organization, the founding countries decided who was allowed to join the conference or engage in test cricket. There was no desire or attempt to create a set of Associate nations that would play in Test status, which is why countries such as Sri Lanka were not permitted to partake until the 1980s.

The international game continued to grow with the introduction of Affiliate Member status in 1984, a level of membership designed for teams with less history of playing cricket. In 1989 the ICC renamed itself the International Cricket Council. Zimbabwe became Full Members in 1992 and Bangladesh in 2000 before Afghanistan and Ireland were both admitted as Test teams in 2018, bringing the number of full members of the ICC to 12.

=== Suspension of South Africa (1970–1991) ===
The greatest crisis to hit international cricket was brought about by apartheid, the South African policy of racial segregation. The situation began to crystallise after 1961 when South Africa left the Commonwealth of Nations and so, under the rules of the day, its cricket board had to leave the International Cricket Conference (ICC). Cricket's opposition to apartheid intensified in 1968 with the cancellation of England's tour to South Africa by the South African authorities, due to the inclusion in the England team of Basil D'Oliveira, a Cape Coloured player. In 1970, the ICC members voted to suspend South Africa indefinitely from international cricket competition.

Starved of top-level competition for its best players, the South African Cricket Board began funding so-called "rebel tours", offering large sums of money for international players to form teams and tour South Africa. The ICC's response was to blacklist any rebel players who agreed to tour South Africa, banning them from officially sanctioned international cricket. As players were poorly remunerated during the 1970s, several accepted the offer to tour South Africa, particularly players getting towards the end of their careers for which a blacklisting would have little effect.

The rebel tours continued into the 1980s but then progress was made in South African politics and it became clear that apartheid was ending. South Africa, now a "Rainbow Nation" under Nelson Mandela, was welcomed back into international sport in 1991.

=== World Series Cricket ===
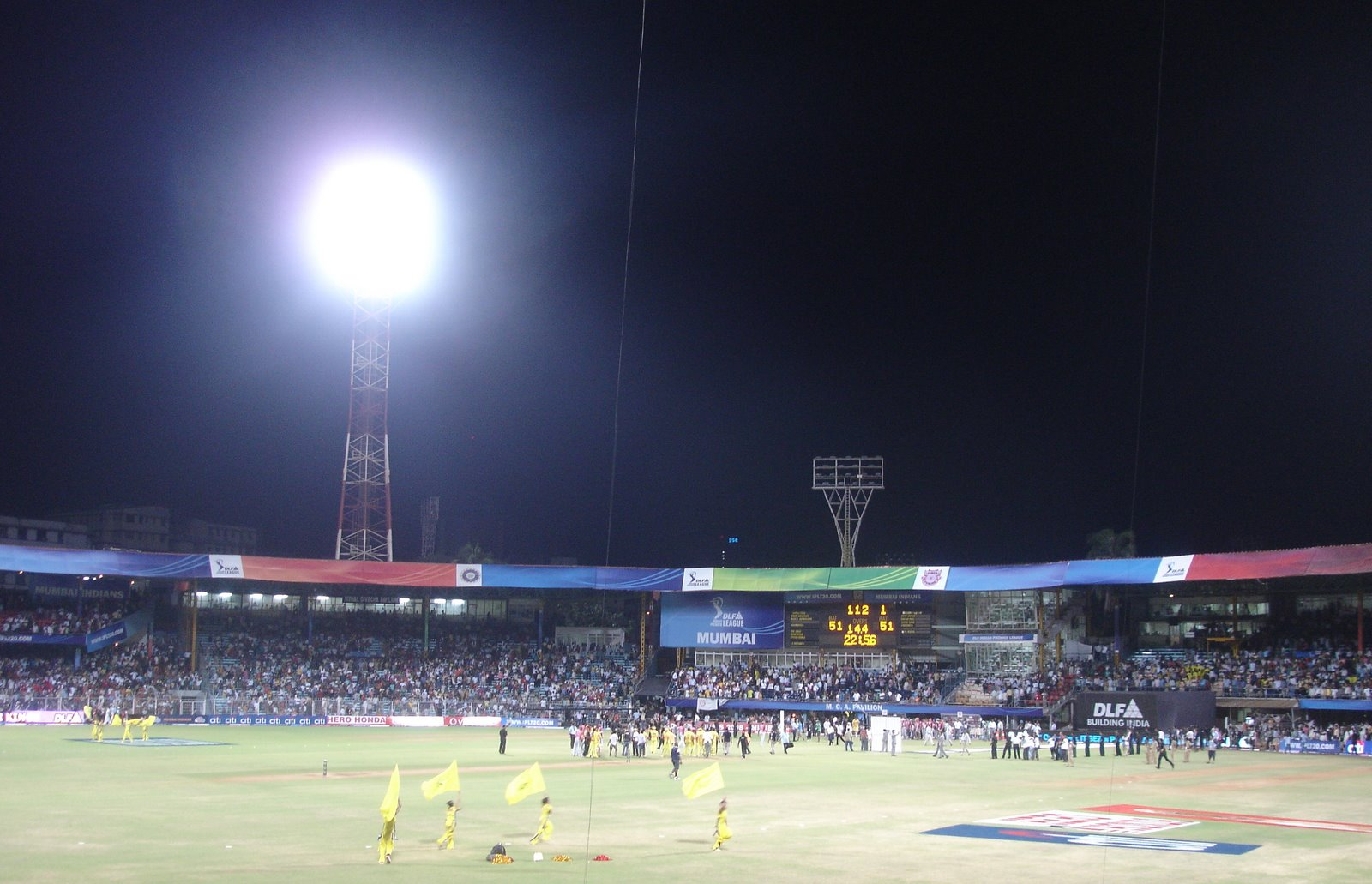
World Series Cricket paved the way for 21st century cricket leagues such as the Indian Premier League (right).

The money problems of top cricketers were also the root cause of another cricketing crisis that arose in 1977 when the Australian media magnate Kerry Packer fell out with the Australian Cricket Board over TV rights. Taking advantage of the low remuneration paid to players, Packer retaliated by signing several of the best players in the world to a privately run cricket league outside the structure of international cricket. World Series Cricket hired some of the banned South African players and allowed them to show off their skills in an international arena against other world-class players. The schism lasted only until 1979 and the "rebel" players were allowed back into established international cricket, though many found that their national teams had moved on without them. Long-term results of World Series Cricket have included the introduction of significantly higher player salaries and innovations such as coloured kits and night games.

=== Limited-overs cricket ===
In the 1960s, English county teams began playing a version of cricket with games of only one innings each and a maximum number of overs per innings. Starting in 1963 as a knockout competition only, limited-overs cricket grew in popularity and, in 1969, a national league was created which consequently caused a reduction in the number of matches in the County Championship. The status of limited overs matches is governed by the official List A categorisation. Although many "traditional" cricket fans objected to the shorter form of the game, limited-overs cricket did have the advantage of delivering a result to spectators within a single day; it did improve cricket's appeal to younger or busier people; and it did prove commercially successful.

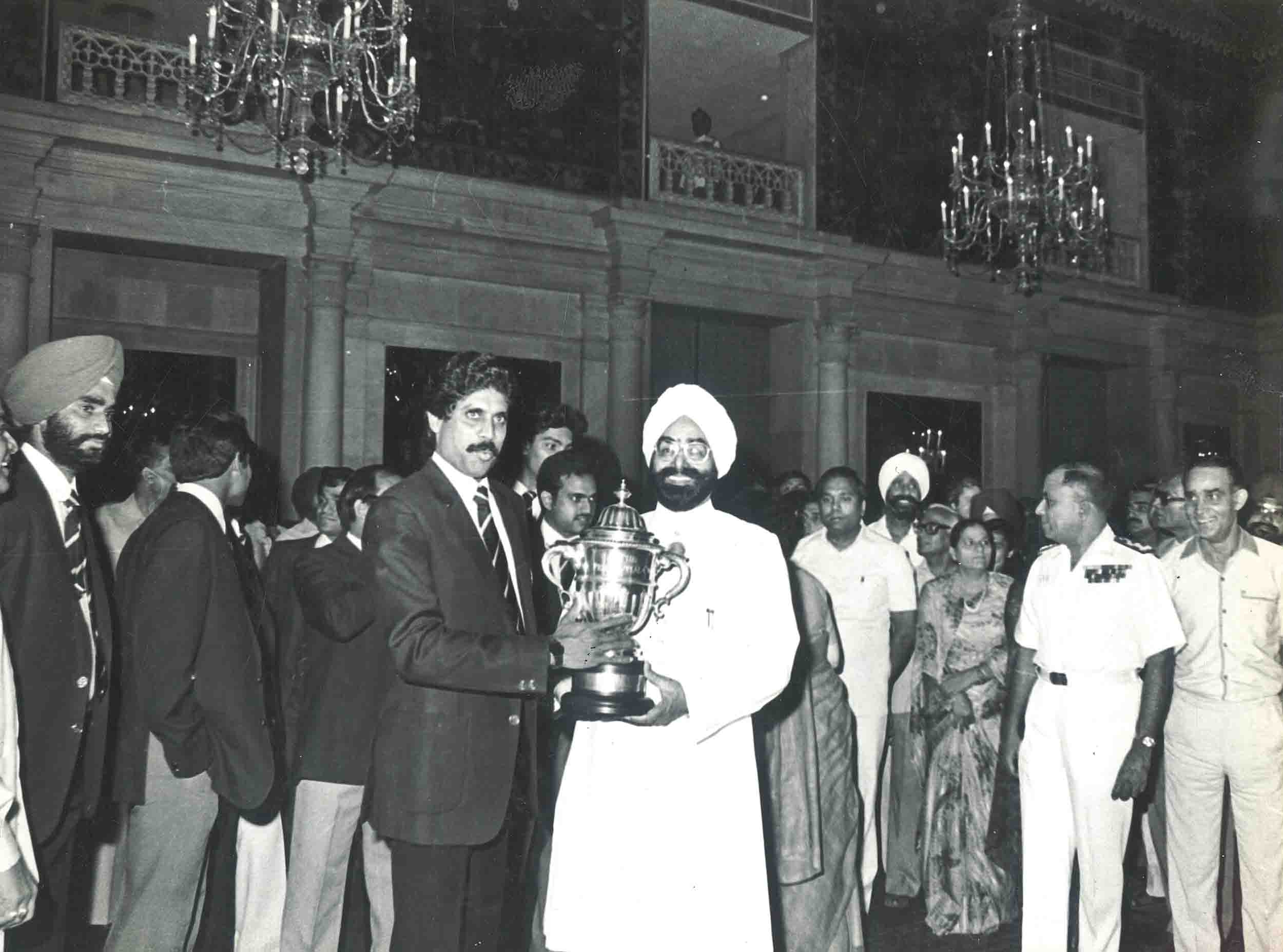
Indian President Zail Singh receiving the Indian cricket team after its 1983 Cricket World Cup victory. Cricket then went on to become the most popular sport in South Asia.

The first limited-overs international match took place at Melbourne Cricket Ground in 1971 as a time-filler after a Test match had been abandoned because of heavy rain on the opening days. It was tried simply as an experiment and to give the players some exercise, but turned out to be immensely popular. Limited-overs internationals (LOIs or ODIs—one-day internationals) have since grown to become a massively popular form of the game, especially for busy people who want to be able to see a whole match. The International Cricket Council reacted to this development by organising the first Cricket World Cup in England in 1975, with all the Test-playing nations taking part.

=== Analytic and graphic technology ===
Limited-overs cricket increased television ratings for cricket coverage. Innovative techniques introduced in coverage of limited-over matches were soon adopted for Test coverage. The innovations included presentation of in-depth statistics and graphical analysis, placing miniature cameras in the stumps, multiple usage of cameras to provide shots from several locations around the ground, high-speed photography and computer graphics technology enabling television viewers to study the course of a delivery and help them understand an umpire's decision.

In 1992, the use of a third umpire to adjudicate run-out appeals with television replays was introduced in the Test series between South Africa and India. The third umpire's duties have subsequently expanded to include decisions on other aspects of play such as stumpings, catches and boundaries. From 2011, the third umpire was being called upon to moderate review of umpires' decisions, including lbw, with the aid of virtual-reality tracking technologies (e.g., Hawk-Eye and Hot Spot), though such measures still could not free some disputed decisions from heated controversy.

== 21st-century cricket ==
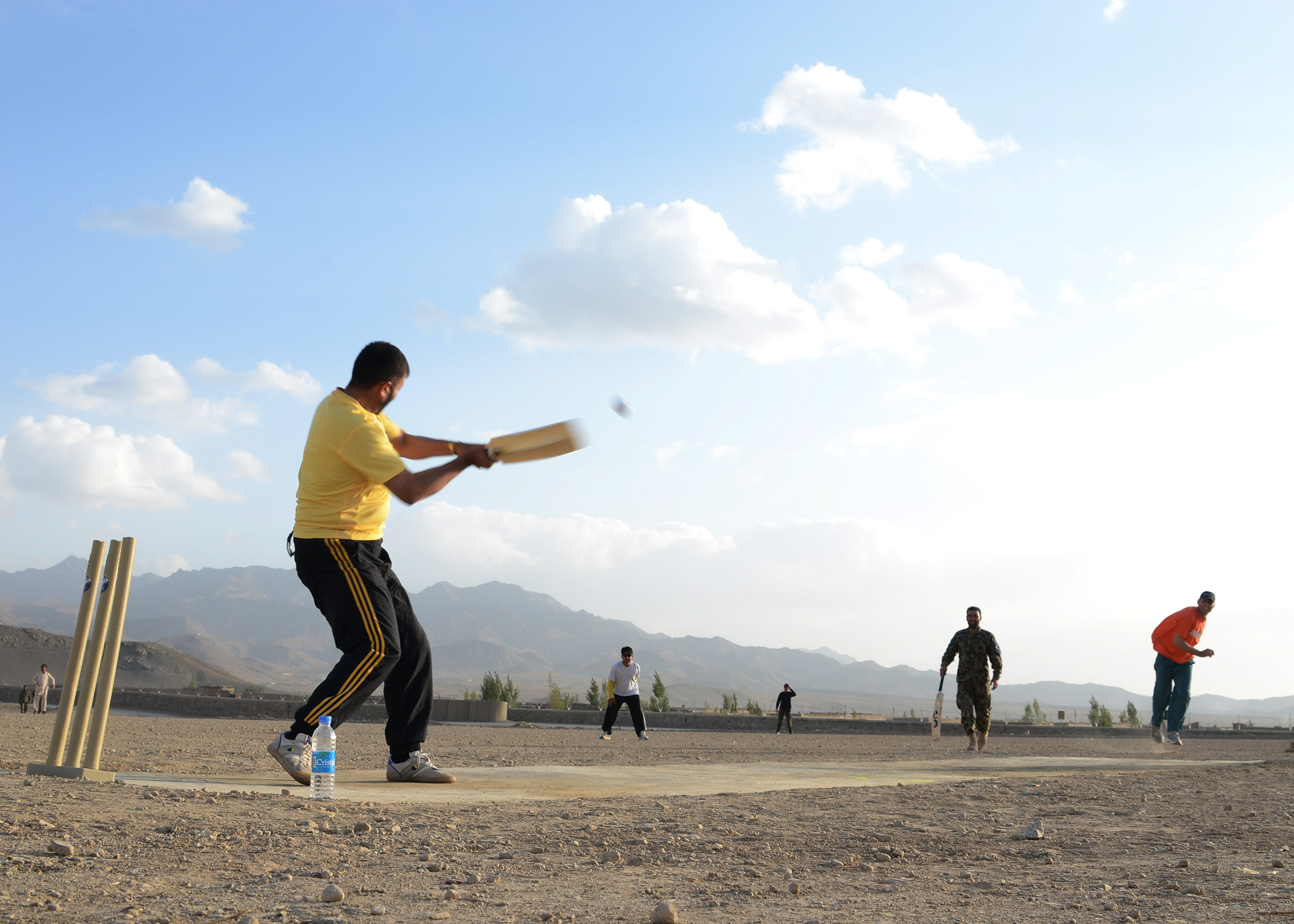
Afghan soldiers playing cricket. Afghan refugees in Pakistan brought the sport back to Afghanistan, and it is now one of the most popular sports in the country.

=== Expansion of the game ===
In June 2001, the ICC introduced a "Test Championship Table" and, in October 2002, a "One-day International Championship Table". As indicated by ICC rankings, the various cricket formats have continued to be a major competitive sport in most former British Empire countries, notably the Indian subcontinent, and new participants including the Netherlands. In 2017, the number of countries with full ICC membership was increased to twelve by the addition of Afghanistan and Ireland. The ICC expanded its development programme, aiming to produce more national teams capable of competing at the various formats. Development efforts are focused on African and Asian nations, and on the United States. In 2004, the ICC Intercontinental Cup brought first-class cricket to 12 nations, mostly for the first time.

=== T20 cricket and shorter formats' growth ===
Cricket's newest innovation is Twenty20 (T20), essentially an evening entertainment started in 2003. It has so far enjoyed enormous popularity and has attracted large attendances at matches as well as good TV audience ratings. The inaugural ICC Twenty20 World Cup tournament was held in 2007. The formation of Twenty20 leagues in India – the unofficial Indian Cricket League, which started in 2007, and the official Indian Premier League, starting in 2008 – raised much speculation in the cricketing press about their effect on the future of cricket.

Formats shorter than Twenty20 have also arisen at the domestic level, such as the T10 format, which is played in leagues organised by various Associate and Full Members, as well as the 100-ball format, which is played in The Hundred, a major limited-overs competition in England. In 100-ball cricket, a bowler bowls 5 balls in an over and is able to bowl two consecutive overs.

== See also ==
- History of women's cricket
- List of calypso songs about cricket - sorted by decades.

== Bibliography ==
- Altham, H.S. (1962). A History of Cricket, Volume 1 (to 1914). George Allen & Unwin.
- Bateman, Anthony. Cricket, literature and culture: symbolising the nation, destabilising empire (Routledge, 2016).
- Birley, Derek (1999). A Social History of English Cricket. Aurum.
- Bowen, Rowland (1970). Cricket: A History of its Growth and Development. Eyre & Spottiswoode.
- Box, Charles (1868). The Theory and Practice of Cricket, from its origin to the present time. Frederick Warne.
- Harte, Chris (1993). A History of Australian Cricket. London: Andre Deutsch. ISBN 0-233-98825-4.
- Lang, Andrew. "The History of Cricket" in Steel A. G.; Lyttelton R. H. Cricket, Longmans 1898 (6th edn)
- Light, Rob. "'In a Yorkshire Like Way': Cricket and the Construction of Regional Identity in Nineteenth-century Yorkshire." Sport in History 29.3 (2009): 500–518.
- McCann, Tim (2004). Sussex Cricket in the Eighteenth Century. Sussex Record Society.
- McKibbin, Ross (1998). Classes and Cultures. England 1918–1951. Oxford: Oxford University Press. pp. 332–39. Archived from the original on 15 September 2015 – via Questia.
- Russell, Dave. "Sport and identity: the case of Yorkshire County Cricket Club, 1890–1939." Twentieth Century British History 7.2 (1996): 206–30.
- Stone, Duncan. "Cricket's regional identities: the development of cricket and identity in Yorkshire and Surrey." Sport in Society 11.5 (2008): 501–16. online
- Underdown, David (2000). Start of Play. Allen Lane.
- Wisden Cricketers' Almanack (annual): various editions
- Wynne-Thomas, Peter (1997). From the Weald to the World. Stationery Office Books.
