= Richmond Cricket Club =

Richmond Cricket Club may refer to:

In England:

- Richmond Cricket Club (18th century), a leading English club in the 18th century, it was first recorded in 1720 and ceased to exist sometime after 1805
- Richmond Cricket Club (London), a present-day London club that competes in the Middlesex County Cricket League
- Richmondshire Cricket Club, a club based in Richmond, North Yorkshire

Other:

- Richmond Cricket Club (Melbourne), a Melbourne-based grade cricket club that was also known as the Monash Tigers from 2013–20
- Richmond Cricket Club (Canada), a British Columbian club that was founded in 1966 and competes in the British Columbia Mainland Cricket League
