= Ice hockey in North America (disambiguation) =

1. REDIRECT Sports in North America#Ice hockey
- To a disambiguation page: This is a redirect to a disambiguation page. This redirect is intended to be linked to by articles that need to refer directly to a disambiguation page. Therefore, this template should only appear on a redirect page that has "(disambiguation)" at the end of its title. For example, since "XX (disambiguation)" redirects to the disambiguation page "XX", then it should be tagged with this template. Ambiguous titles that do not have page names ending with "(disambiguation)" should use {{R from ambiguous term}} instead. For instance, "Xx" redirects to "XX", so it should bear {{R from ambiguous term}}, and not {{R to disambiguation page}}. For disambiguations that later prove to still be ambiguous, e.g. "(painter)" when there are multiple notable painters by the same name, and which redirect to disambiguation pages, then {{R from incomplete disambiguation}} is the appropriate rcat template.
