= Sports in North America =

Overview of sports traditions and activities in North America

The North American continent is the birthplace of several organized sports, such as basketball, charrería/rodeo, gridiron football, ice hockey, jaripeo/bull riding, lacrosse, ollamaliztl (ancient Mesoamerican sport), mixed martial arts (MMA), padel, pickleball, racquetball, ultimate, and volleyball. The modern versions of baseball and softball, skateboarding, snowboarding, stock car racing, and surfing also developed in North America.

Sports leagues in North America use a mix of organizational structures. While common in other parts of the world, not all North American countries use the promotion-relegation (Pro-Rel) system for their association football/soccer leagues. Notably, Mexico's league has temporarily suspended its Pro-Rel system but is expected to being reinstated in the coming years. Leagues of other sports generally have a closed league using a franchise system.

Major League Baseball (MLB), the National Basketball Association (NBA), the National Football League (NFL), the National Hockey League (NHL), Major League Soccer (MLS), the National Collegiate Athletic Association (NCAA), the Ultimate Fighting Championship (UFC), and Liga MX are the predominant sports organizations in the North American sports landscape.

Other notable sports organizations include lower level sports leagues/orgs such as Bellator MMA (Bellator), the Canadian Football League (CFL), Caribbean Series baseball, the Mexican League (LMP, Liga Mexicana de Béisbol), the Mexican Pacific League (LMP, Liga Mexicana del Pacífico), Minor League Baseball (MiLB), NASCAR auto racing, NCAA College Baseball World Series, PGA Tour golf, Premier Boxing Champions (PBC), Top Rank boxing, USL Championship soccer, and the US Open (tennis). There are also many notable women's sports leagues/orgs such as Liga MX Femenil, LPGA Tour golf, the National Women's Soccer League (NWSL), NCAA women's college basketball, the Professional Women's Hockey League (PWHL), and the Women's National Basketball Association (WNBA).

== Team sports ==
=== Association football ===
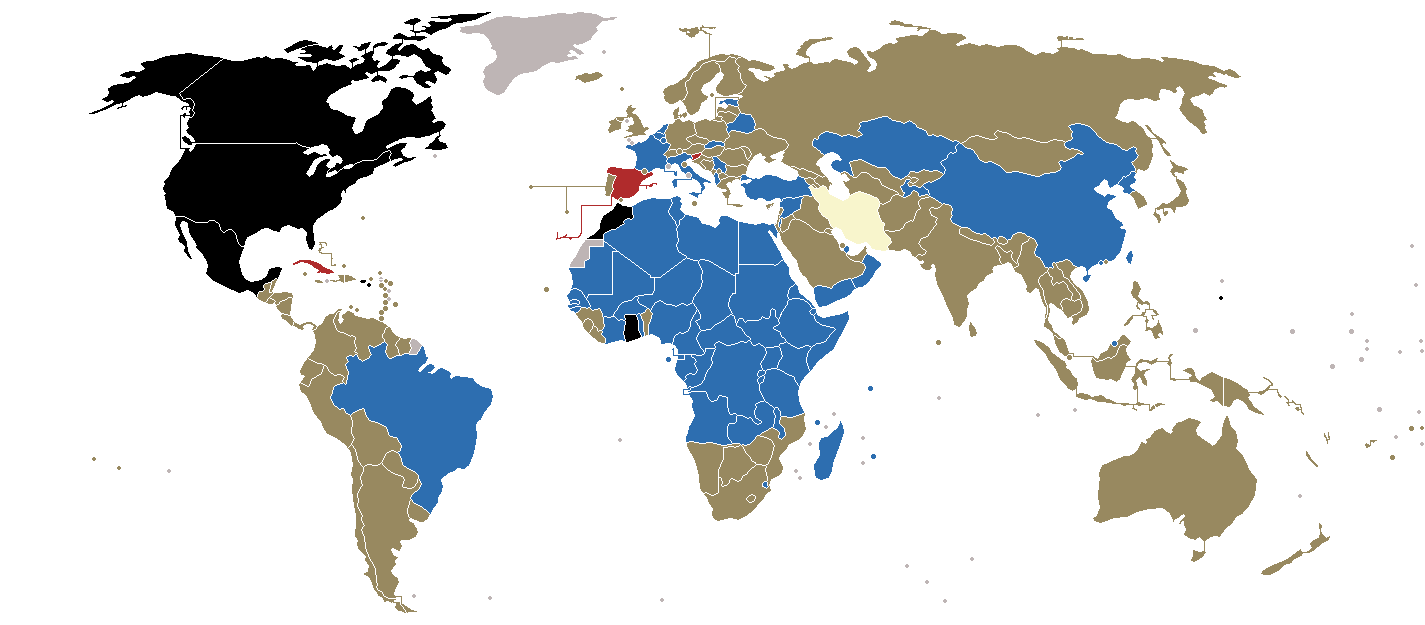
Canada, Mexico, and the United States won the right to host the 2026 FIFA World Cup

Association football (soccer) is the most popular sport in North America. 27% of the sports fans in the United States are interested in association football. 73% of Mexicans support a Liga MX club. 15% of Canadians see themselves as association football fans. Association football is also the most popular sport in Guatemala, the fourth-most populated country in North America.

Unqualified, football is generally understood to refer to whichever form of football is the most popular in the regional context in which the word appears. For example, "football" unqualified primarily refers to American football in the US, Canadian football in Canada, and association football in Mexico, the Caribbean, and Central America. The word soccer is used to refer to association football by many people in the US and Canada.

CONCACAF is the continental governing body for association football in North America, and runs two visible tournaments: the Gold Cup and the Champions League The Gold Cup is competed every two years among the men's national teams to determine the regional champion of North America. The Champions League is an annual continental competition for the top football clubs in North America, with the winner advancing to the FIFA Club World Cup.

Liga MX is North America's most popular association football league with an average attendance of 25,557 during the 2014–15 season. It forms the top level of the Mexican men's, four-level league system, with Ascenso MX, Segunda División de México, and Tercera División de México. This Mexican league system uses promotion and relegation, where teams are transferred between levels based on their final records at the end of the season. For women, the Super Liga Femenil de Fútbol is at the top level.

The men's professional soccer league systems in both the U.S. and Canada instead primarily use the closed, franchise model which primarily always has the same teams playing. Major League Soccer (MLS) represents the highest level, while the second level consists of the USL Championship. Although the MLS has teams in both countries, they are only sanctioned by the United States Soccer Federation (USSF), the governing body of soccer in the United States. For women' professional soccer, the National Women's Soccer League is at the top level, and United Women's Soccer and Women's Premier Soccer League are at the second level. College soccer is played both in the U.S. and Canada, with top players often going on to play professional.

Other countries with multi-level professional league systems include Costa Rica, El Salvador, Guatemala, Honduras, Jamaica, Nicaragua, and Panama. Most of these use promotion and regulation.

==== Followers ====
The top three most popular football clubs on social media from North America as of 25 March 2021:

| # | Football club | Country | Followers |
|---|---|---|---|
| 1 | Club América | Mexico | 36 million |
| 2 | CD Guadalajara | Mexico | 13 million |
| 3 | Cruz Azul | Mexico | 6.6 million |

==== Attendances ====
The CONCACAF clubs with an average home league attendance of at least 20,000 in the 2024–25 and 2025 seasons:

| # | Club | Country | Average |
|---|---|---|---|
| 1 | CF Monterrey | Mexico | 44,821 |
| 2 | Atlanta United | United States | 41,435 |
| 3 | Tigres | Mexico | 38,447 |
| 4 | CD Guadalajara | Mexico | 32,866 |
| 5 | Seattle Sounders | United States | 30,993 |
| 6 | Charlotte FC | United States | 28,975 |
| 7 | San Diego FC | United States | 28,064 |
| 8 | Deportivo Toluca | Mexico | 26,883 |
| 9 | Club León | Mexico | 25,780 |
| 10 | Club América | Mexico | 25,685 |
| 11 | Nashville SC | United States | 25,618 |
| 12 | FC Cincinnati | United States | 24,668 |
| 13 | New England Revolution | United States | 24,477 |
| 14 | Chicago Fire | United States | 23,450 |
| 15 | Columbus Crew | United States | 22,795 |
| 16 | Portland Timbers | United States | 22,405 |
| 17 | St. Louis CITY | United States | 21,969 |
| 18 | LAFC | United States | 21,931 |
| 19 | Vancouver Whitecaps | Canada | 21,806 |
| 20 | NYCFC | United States | 21,591 |
| 21 | Toronto FC | Canada | 21,353 |
| 22 | Universidad Nacional | Mexico | 21,173 |
| 23 | Atlas | Mexico | 20,902 |
| 24 | Austin FC | United States | 20,738 |
| 25 | Orlando City | United States | 20,573 |
| 26 | Inter Miami | United States | 20,505 |
| 27 | LA Galaxy | United States | 20,067 |

=== Baseball ===
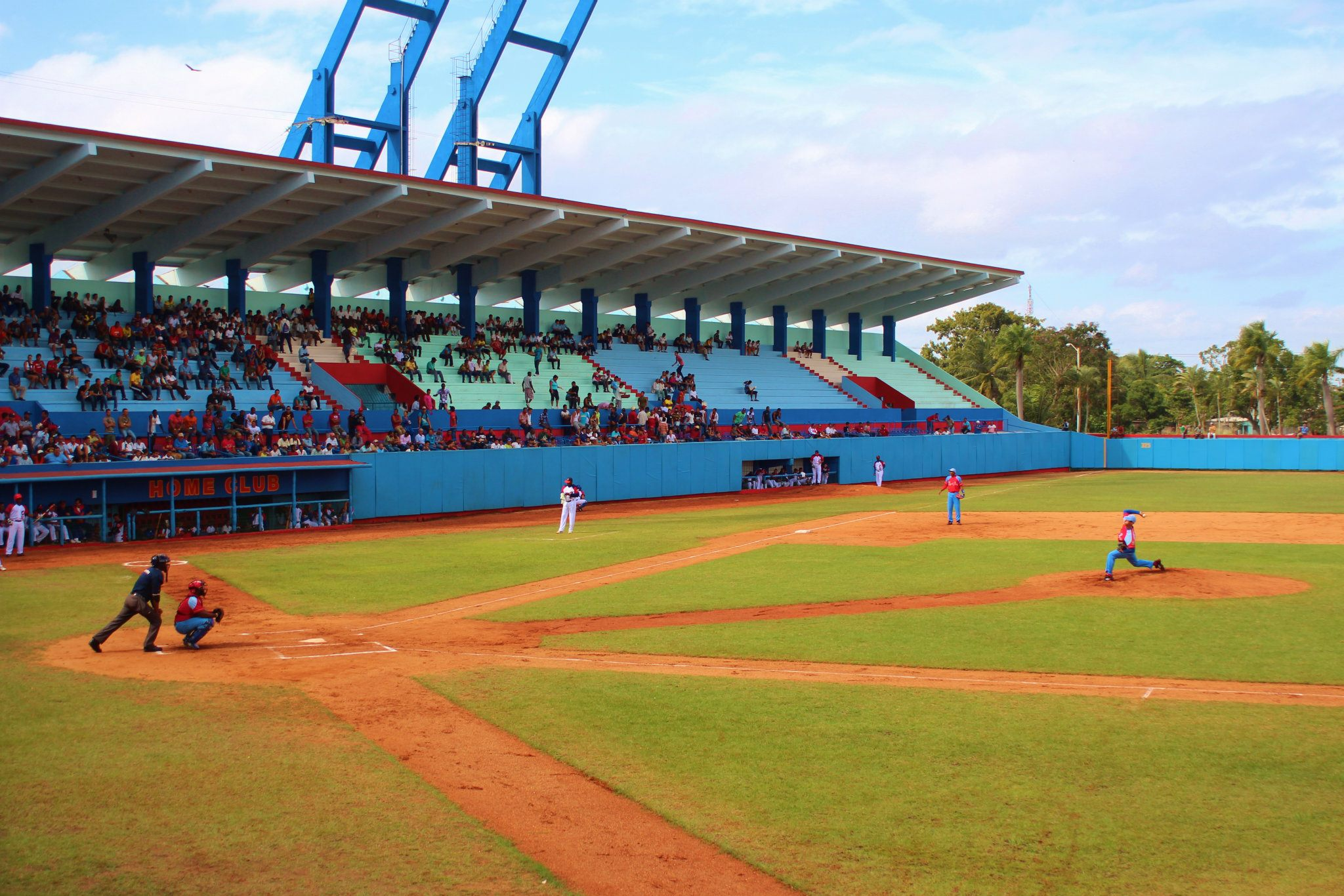
Baseball in Cuba

Baseball evolved from older bat-and-ball games already being played in England by the mid-18th century. This game was brought by immigrants to North America, where the modern version developed. By the late 19th century, baseball was widely recognized as the national sport of the United States. The sport is currently popular in various other North American countries.

In the US and Canada, Major League Baseball (MLB) is the top professional level of baseball, while Minor League Baseball (MiLB) comprises several levels and multiple component leagues below MLB. MiLB also has teams and component leagues in Mexico, with the Mexican Baseball League (LMB; Liga Mexicana de Béisbol), and in the Dominican Republic, with the Dominican Summer League. The relationship between MLB and MilB is also the closed, franchise model, which has the same teams playing, and where the players are transferred between levels. Though not associated with MLB, the independent Mexican Pacific League (LMP; Liga Mexicana del Pacífico) is perhaps the top league in Mexico (winter league), comparable to the LMB (summer league).

Other professional leagues in North America include the Dominican Professional Baseball League, the Nicaraguan Professional Baseball League, the Panamanian Professional Baseball League, and the Liga de Béisbol Profesional Roberto Clemente in Puerto Rico.

The Cuban National Series is the primary domestic amateur baseball competition in Cuba. It forms part of the Cuban baseball league system, run by the Baseball Federation of Cuba, the governing body of baseball in that country. Amateur baseball in the United States consists of various organizations. Primarily because of MiLB, college baseball in the U.S. plays a smaller role in developing professional players than what college football and basketball do with its players. Amateur baseball in Canada includes Ligue de Baseball Élite du Québec, the New Brunswick Senior Baseball League, and the Nova Scotia Senior Baseball League.

==== Attendances ====
In the 2025 league season, 25 North American baseball teams recorded an average home league attendance of at least 20,000:

| # | Team | Country | Average |
|---|---|---|---|
| 1 | Los Angeles Dodgers | United States | 49,536 |
| 2 | San Diego Padres | United States | 42,434 |
| 3 | New York Yankees | United States | 42,408 |
| 4 | Philadelphia Phillies | United States | 41,672 |
| 5 | New York Mets | United States | 39,775 |
| 6 | Chicago Cubs | United States | 37,259 |
| 7 | San Francisco Giants | United States | 36,121 |
| 8 | Atlanta Braves | United States | 35,841 |
| 9 | Toronto Blue Jays | Canada | 35,184 |
| 10 | Boston Red Sox | United States | 34,277 |
| 11 | Houston Astros | United States | 33,677 |
| 12 | Milwaukee Brewers | United States | 32,717 |
| 13 | Los Angeles Angels | United States | 32,290 |
| 14 | Seattle Mariners | United States | 31,333 |
| 15 | Colorado Rockies | United States | 30,057 |
| 16 | Detroit Tigers | United States | 29,795 |
| 17 | Texas Rangers | United States | 29,593 |
| 18 | Arizona Diamondbacks | United States | 29,555 |
| 19 | St. Louis Cardinals | United States | 27,777 |
| 20 | Cincinnati Reds | United States | 26,967 |
| 21 | Cleveland Guardians | United States | 25,325 |
| 22 | Washington Nationals | United States | 23,959 |
| 23 | Baltimore Orioles | United States | 22,545 |
| 24 | Minnesota Twins | United States | 22,108 |
| 25 | Kansas City Royals | United States | 21,860 |

In the 2025 league season, six North American baseball teams outside Canada and the United States recorded an average home league attendance of at least 5,000:

| # | Team | Country | Average |
|---|---|---|---|
| 1 | Diablos Rojos | Mexico | 6,728 |
| 2 | Tigres del Licey | Dominican Republic | 5,493 |
| 3 | Industriales | Cuba | 5,485 |
| 4 | Sultanes de Monterrey | Mexico | 5,243 |
| 5 | Leones del Escogido | Dominican Republic | 5,231 |
| 6 | Leones de Yucatán | Mexico | 5,052 |

=== Basketball ===
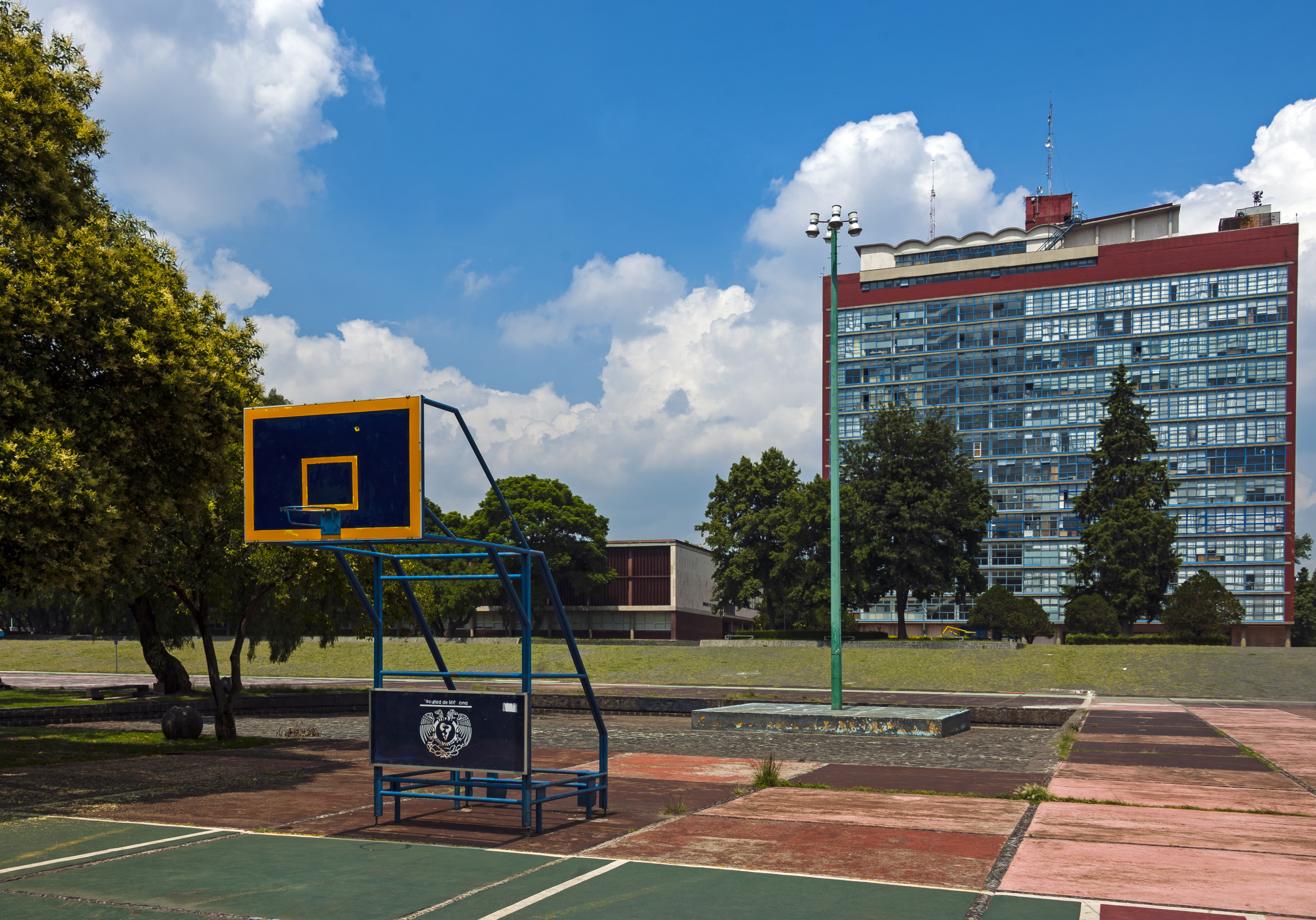
University basketball court in Mexico City

Canadian Dr. James Naismith is credited with creating the game of basketball in 1891. While working as a physical education professor and instructor at the International Young Men's Christian Association Training School (YMCA) (today, Springfield College) in Springfield, Massachusetts, U.S., he primarily created the game as a way to could keep his gym class active indoors on a rainy day. The sport quickly spread throughout the US and Canada, with Naismith becoming instrumental in establishing college basketball.

Today, the National Basketball Association (NBA), with teams in the U.S. and one in Canada, is widely considered to be the highest level of professional basketball in the world, and NBA players are the world's best paid athletes by average annual salary per player. The NBA operates a minor league basketball organization, the NBA Development League, to help develop players. However, like the relationship between college football and the NFL, college basketball acts as the primary suppliers of players to the NBA.

The Liga Nacional de Baloncesto Profesional, is the top professional basketball league in Mexico, while Liga Nacional de Baloncesto is the top one in the Dominican Republic. The Baloncesto Superior Nacional (BSN) has teams in Puerto Rico.

The NBA also runs the Women's National Basketball Association (WNBA), with many teams having direct NBA counterparts and playing in the same arenas. Similarly, the Baloncesto Superior Nacional Femenino (BSNF) is the women's counterpart professional league to the BSN in Puerto Rico.

College basketball (particularly regarding NCAA Division I men's college basketball), technically considered an amateur sport, is as prominent in the U.S. as some of the major professional sports leagues around the world. College basketball draws average viewership of 10.7 million per game for its annual "March Madness" tournament. By and large, most future NBA players come from these collegiate basketball programs, serving as the feeder system to the NBA.

==== Attendances ====
The top 20 North American basketball teams by average home league attendance in the 2024–25 season:

| # | Team | Country | Average |
|---|---|---|---|
| 1 | North Carolina | United States | 20,521 |
| 2 | Kentucky | United States | 20,334 |
| 3 | Chicago Bulls | United States | 20,138 |
| 4 | Tennessee | United States | 20,026 |
| 5 | Dallas Mavericks | United States | 20,079 |
| 6 | Philadelphia 76ers | United States | 19,846 |
| 7 | New York Knicks | United States | 19,799 |
| 8 | Denver Nuggets | United States | 19,783 |
| 9 | Miami Heat | United States | 19,715 |
| 10 | Cleveland Cavaliers | United States | 19,433 |
| 11 | Boston Celtics | United States | 19,158 |
| 12 | Detroit Pistons | United States | 19,071 |
| 13 | Arkansas | United States | 18,996 |
| 14 | Syracuse | United States | 18,888 |
| 15 | Minnesota Timberwolves | United States | 18,833 |
| 16 | Toronto Raptors | Canada | 18,744 |
| 17 | Los Angeles Lakers | United States | 18,724 |
| 18 | Orlando Magic | United States | 18,587 |
| 19 | Utah Jazz | United States | 18,174 |
| 20 | Golden State Warriors | United States | 18,061 |

=== Gridiron football ===
North America is the birthplace of gridiron football, the form of football that originally developed, and is primarily played, in the U.S. and Canada. Both major forms, American football and Canadian football, developed in the late 19th century out of the original games now known as rugby football and association football. Gridiron football is distinguished by the forward pass, the system of downs, a line of scrimmage, measurements in yards, players wearing hard plastic helmets and shoulder pads, more specialist positions and formations, among others. Walter Camp, known as the "Father of American Football", is credited with creating the system of downs and line of scrimmage rules in the 1880s that originally differentiate gridiron football from its older counterparts. Canada would later implement similar rules when the Ontario Rugby Football Union adopted the Burnside rules in 1903.

==== American football ====
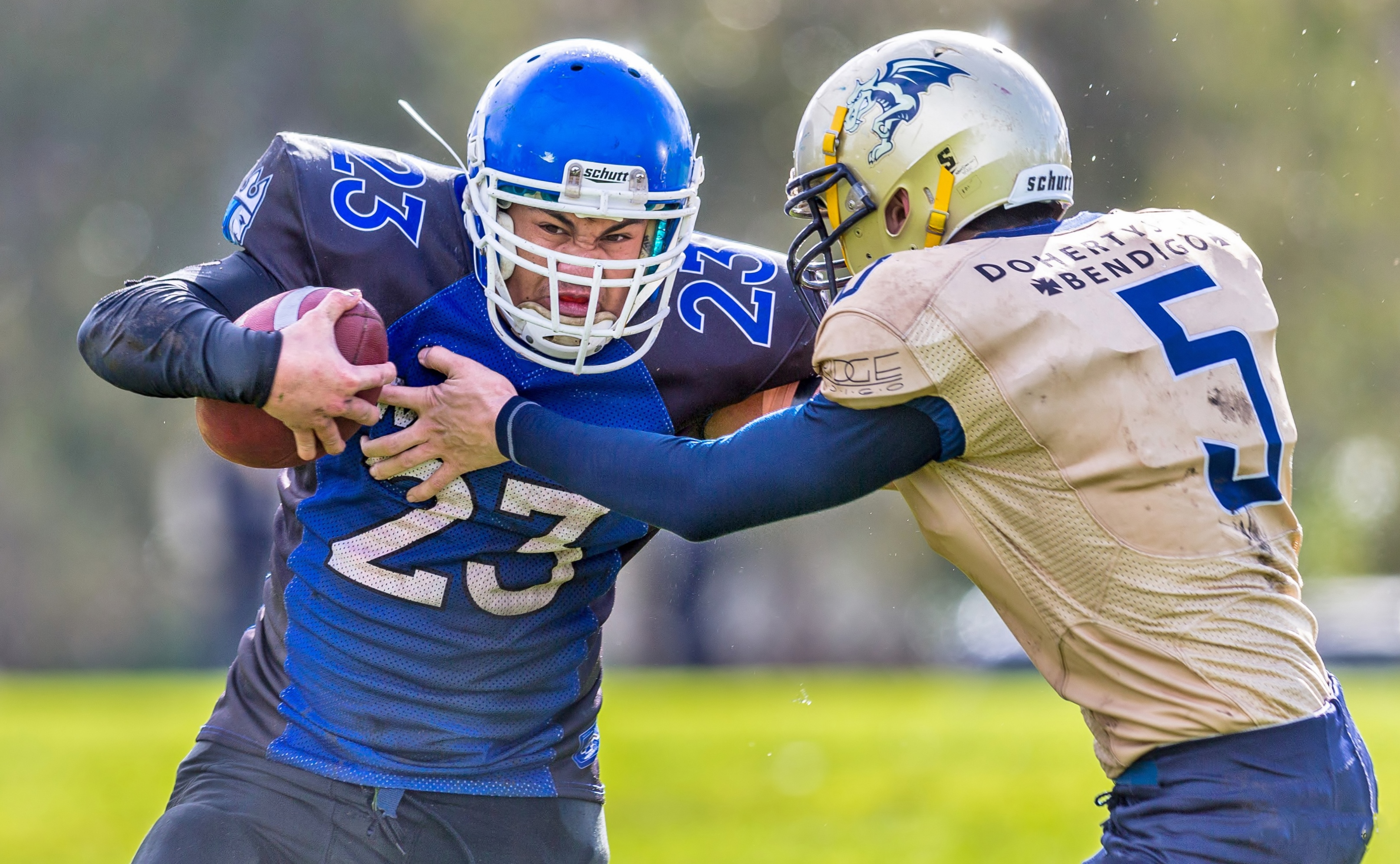

The National Football League (NFL) is the highest professional level of American football in the world, with teams across the United States. College football in the U.S. is primarily organized by the NCAA. The NCAA further divides its Division I football teams into the Football Bowl Subdivision and the Football Championship Subdivision. The Football Bowl Subdivision has the largest and most competitive schools, and is noted for its system of postseason bowl games.

USA Football is the governing body for amateur American football in the U.S., and is a member of the International Federation of American Football (IFAF), the international governing body of American football associations. Several other North American counties are a part of IFAF Americas, the federation of IFAF members in the Americas.

In Mexico, the Liga de Fútbol Americano Profesional is the professional league, while ONEFA organizes college football.

===== Attendances =====
In the 2023–24 and 2024 league seasons, seven sports teams recorded an average home league attendance of at least 100,000. All seven teams are American football teams. The teams are listed in the table below. Despite these high averages, the total attendances of these seven teams are relatively low compared to those of teams in other sports.

| # | Team | Country | Average |
|---|---|---|---|
| 1 | Michigan Wolverines | United States | 110,548 |
| 2 | Penn State Nittany Lions | United States | 108,379 |
| 3 | Ohio State Buckeyes | United States | 104,216 |
| 4 | Texas A&M Aggies | United States | 102,847 |
| 5 | Texas Longhorns | United States | 102,386 |
| 6 | Tennessee Volunteers | United States | 101,915 |
| 7 | Alabama Crimson Tide | United States | 100,077 |

==== Canadian football ====
The Canadian Football League (CFL) is the highest professional level of Canadian football, with teams across Canada. Teams from Canadian universities compete in U Sports football. The Canadian Junior Football League and Quebec Junior Football League field teams with players aged 18–22.

Football Canada is the governing body for amateur Canadian football. Although it primarily focuses on the Canadian form of the game, it is also a member of the International Federation of American Football.

===== Attendances =====
In the 2025 league season, six Canadian football teams recorded an average home league attendance of at least 20,000:

| # | Team | Country | Average |
|---|---|---|---|
| 1 | Winnipeg Blue Bombers | Canada | 32,343 |
| 2 | Saskatchewan Roughriders | Canada | 28,427 |
| 3 | BC Lions | Canada | 27,124 |
| 4 | Hamilton Tiger-Cats | Canada | 22,858 |
| 5 | Calgary Stampeders | Canada | 22,295 |
| 6 | Alouettes de Montréal | Canada | 21,132 |

=== Ice hockey ===
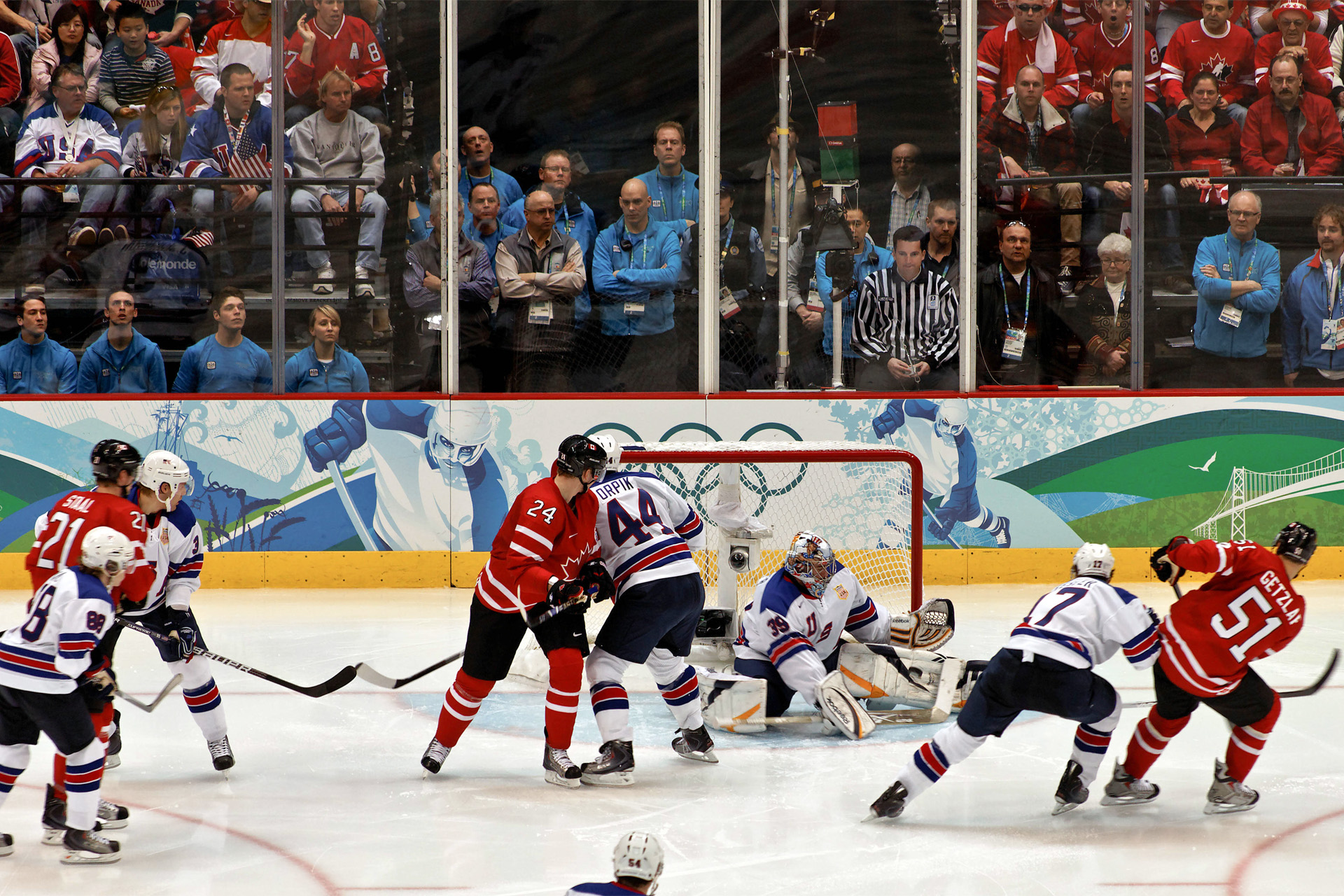
Canada vs USA

Montreal, Canada, is recognized as the birthplace of organized contemporary ice hockey. On March 3, 1875, the first organized indoor game was played at Montreal's Victoria Skating Rink.

With teams in both Canada and the United States, the National Hockey League (NHL) is considered to be the premier professional ice hockey league in the world, The American Hockey League (AHL) then serves as the primary developmental minor league for the NHL, with the ECHL being at the third level. There are also a professional women's league: the National Women's Hockey League with teams in the Northeastern U.S.. Junior ice hockey is played in both countries by players between 16 and 21 years of age. In Canada, the highest level is known as Major Junior, and is governed by the Canadian Hockey League, which itself has three constituent leagues: the Ontario Hockey League, Quebec Major Junior Hockey League, and the Western Hockey League. The second level, Junior A is governed by the Canadian Junior Hockey League. The lower levels, Junior B and Junior C, are run by various other leagues. In the U.S., the top level is represented by the United States Hockey League, the second level is represented by the North American Hockey League, and then there are several leagues at the third level.

Liga Mexicana Élite is the top-level league in Mexico, where ice hockey is not popular, but slowly growing.

==== Attendances ====
In the 2024-25 league season, Club de hockey Canadien became the only ice hockey club in the world with an average home league attendance of at least 20,000. The average was 21,105.

The top 20 North American ice hockey teams by average home league attendance in the 2024–25 season:

| # | Team | Country | Average |
|---|---|---|---|
| 1 | Club de hockey Canadien | Canada | 21,105 |
| 2 | Detroit Red Wings | United States | 19,345 |
| 3 | Chicago Blackhawks | United States | 19,130 |
| 4 | Tampa Bay Lightning | United States | 19,092 |
| 5 | Florida Panthers | United States | 19,059 |
| 6 | Columbus Blue Jackets | United States | 18,935 |
| 7 | Vancouver Canucks | Canada | 18,880 |
| 8 | Toronto Maple Leafs | Canada | 18,829 |
| 9 | Carolina Hurricanes | United States | 18,795 |
| 10 | Philadelphia Flyers | United States | 18,525 |
| 11 | Minnesota Wild | United States | 18,430 |
| 12 | Dallas Stars | United States | 18,392 |
| 13 | Edmonton Oilers | Canada | 18,347 |
| 14 | Washington Capitals | United States | 18,244 |
| 15 | Colorado Avalanche | United States | 18,067 |
| 16 | Vegas Golden Knights | United States | 17,975 |
| 17 | New York Rangers | United States | 17,861 |
| 18 | Boston Bruins | United States | 17,852 |
| 19 | St. Louis Blues | United States | 17,724 |
| 20 | Calgary Flames | Canada | 17,655 |

=== Cricket ===
Member nations of Cricket West Indies, an Anglo-Caribbean team

Cricket in the West Indies is the second most popular sport in the Caribbean after association football. Originally introduced to the West Indies by British colonists, the sport's popularity spread and became a major part of West Indian culture. Domestic competitions organised across the whole of the West Indies include the Regional Four Day Competition (First-class), the Regional Super50 (List A) and the Caribbean Premier League (Twenty20). A single governing body, the West Indies Cricket Board, organizes cricket in over a dozen mainly English-speaking Caribbean countries and dependencies.

Conversely, Cricket in Canada is a minor sport, which is unusual among the former Dominions of the British Empire. Cricket Canada, the governing body of the sport in Canada, has organized several domestic inter-provincial cricket competitions such as the CIBC National Cricket League and the TJT National Cricket League.

Cricket in the United States has not been historically popular in the States, as Baseball, another summertime bat and ball sport, is favored as U.S. pastime. And secondly, when the International Cricket Council was formed in 1909 as cricket's international governing body, it was open only to Commonwealth nations and thereby excluded the U.S. from participating in the sport at the highest level. There have also been several attempts to form professional cricket leagues, but some like the American Premier League never got off the ground, and others like Pro Cricket only lasted for one year. However, USA Cricket, the governing body of the sport in the U.S., is currently administering Major League Cricket, the highest level of T20 cricket played in the country.

== Individual sports ==
=== Boxing ===
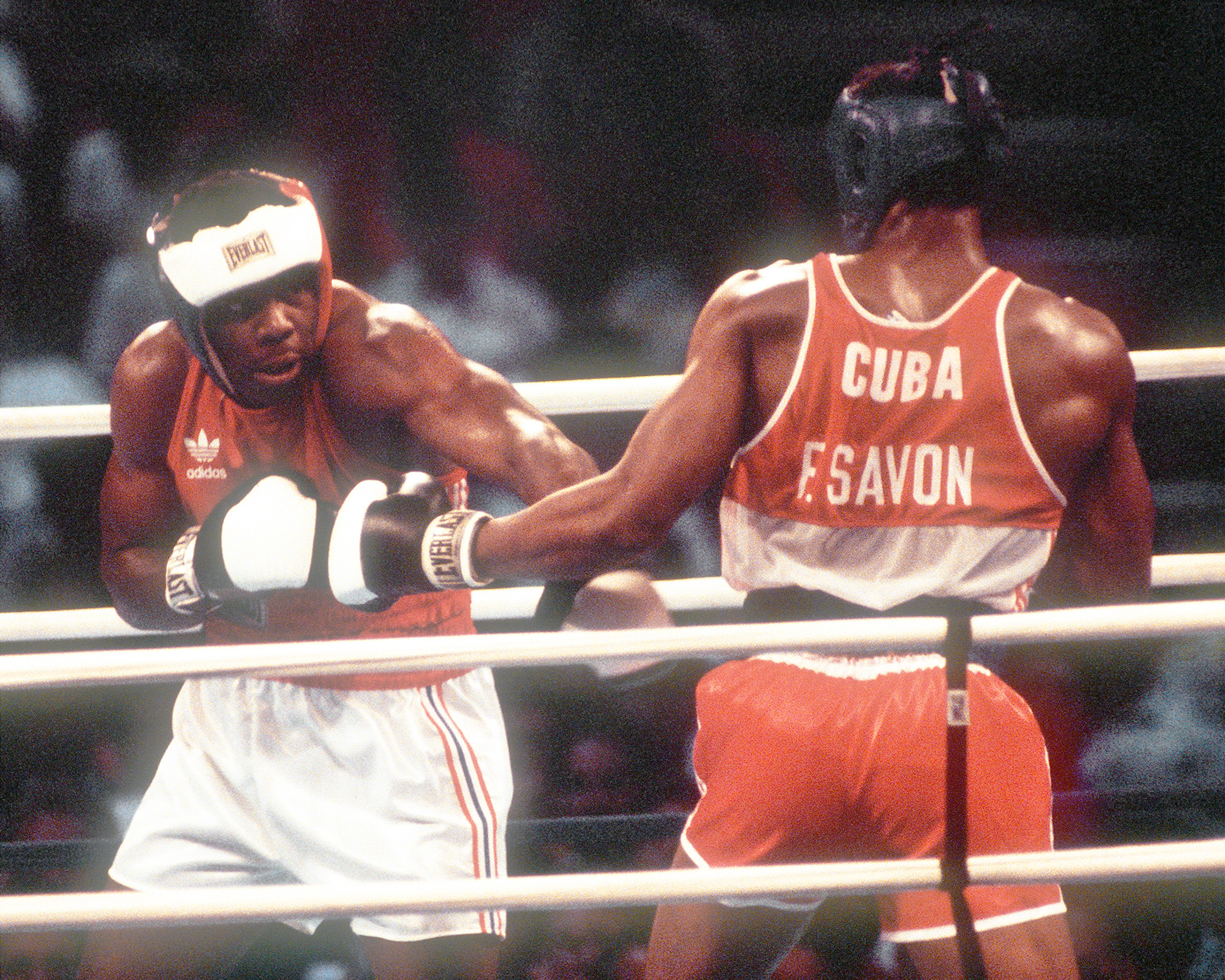
1987 Pan American Games match

While Boxing is a global sport, North America has a strong and lengthy history of dominance in the sport. The U.S. and Mexico have produced the 1st and 2nd most world champions in boxing history, while Puerto Rico, Panama, Nicaragua, and the Dominican Republic have produced the 1st, 2nd, 4th, and 5th most world champions per capita in boxing history, respectively (as of January 2021). At the amateur level Boxing in Cuba remains popular, with about 19,000 boxers hailing from that country. It is also a major sport in Mexico, having produced over 179 professional world champions. Boxing in Canada has been practiced in that country since before the Canadian Confederation in 1867. As for the United States, it became the center of professional boxing in the early 20th century.

All four of the major world sanctioning bodies in boxing are based in North America: the International Boxing Federation (Springfield, New Jersey), the World Boxing Association (Panama City), the World Boxing Council (Mexico City), and the World Boxing Organization (San Juan, Puerto Rico).

=== Golf ===
Three of the four men's major golf championships are held in North America: the Masters Tournament, the U.S. Open, and the PGA Championship. Three of the five women's major golf championships are also played on the continent: the ANA Inspiration, the Women's PGA Championship, and the United States Women's Open Championship.

The PGA Tour and the LPGA Tour are both headquartered in Florida.

=== Horse racing ===
A few North American countries hold their own Triple Crown of Thoroughbred Racing series. The Triple Crown in the United States consists of the Kentucky Derby, the Preakness Stakes, and the Belmont Stakes. The Canadian Triple Crown has the Queen's Plate, the Prince of Wales Stakes, and the Breeders' Stakes. The Barbados Triple Crown of Thoroughbred Racing includes the Barbados Guineas, the Midsummer Creole Classic, and the Barbados Derby. All three races in the Mexican Triple Crown series are held at the Hipódromo de las Américas in Mexico City.

The Triple Crowns for both pacers and trotters are both held in the United States.

The Breeders' Cup, the annual series of Grade I Thoroughbred horse races, has been held in both the United States and Canada.

=== Mixed martial arts ===
A relatively new sport, mixed martial arts (MMA) was first sanctioned and codified by the California State Athletic Commission (CSAC) and the New Jersey State Athletic Control Board (SACB) in the year 2000, establishing the official rules of the modern version of the sport. Various versions of the sport have existed going back to antiquity; Lei tai in China, Pankration in Greece.

=== Motorsports ===
Auto racing is also popular in North America. INDYCAR and NASCAR are both headquartered in the United States, with the Indianapolis 500 and the NASCAR Cup Series being their top competitions, respectively. Grands Prix in Formula One are held in Canada, Mexico and the United States.

=== Tennis ===
Tennis is popular in North America. Among the major events, the US Open, one of the four Grand Slam events, is held annually at the USTA Billie Jean King National Tennis Center in New York City.

The Women's Tennis Association, the principal organizing body of women's professional tennis, is headquartered in St. Petersburg, Florida. Tennis Canada, the Central American & Caribbean Tennis Confederation, and the United States Tennis Association are the regional member organizations of the International Tennis Federation, and help organize various events in their respective areas of North America.

== Events ==
- North American Indigenous Games

== See also ==
- Sport in Africa
- Sport in Asia
- Sport in Europe
- Sport in Oceania
- Sport in South America
