= Cricket Canada =

Governing body of cricket in Canada

- Sport: Cricket
- Jurisdiction: Canada
- Founded: 1892
- Headquarters: Toronto, Canada
- Location: Toronto
- President: Arwinder Khosa
- Secretary: Paramjit Shahi
- General Manager: Ingleton Liburd
- Men's coach: Monty Desai
- Women's coach: Rizwan Cheema

Official website
- cricketcanada.org
- (Canada)

Cricket Canada, known as the Canadian Cricket Association (CCA) until November 2007, is the governing body of cricket in Canada. It was established in 1892 and has its current headquarters in Toronto, Ontario. It administers the national men's and women's teams, as well as several youth teams at various age levels. In addition, Cricket Canada and its affiliates run several grassroots and development programs and leagues nationwide. Cricket Canada is Canada's representative at the International Cricket Council and has been an associate member of that body since 1968. It is included in the ICC Americas region.

== History ==
Introduced by the British, cricket was the most popular sport in Canada until the early 20th century when it was overtaken by ice hockey and other sports. Cricket was so popular it was declared the national sport by John A. Macdonald, Canada's first Prime Minister. Today, cricket is the fastest growing sport in Canada, with well over 40,000 cricketers across the nation. While Canada is not sanctioned to play Test matches, the team does take part in One Day International (ODI) matches and also in first-class games (in the ICC Intercontinental Cup) against other non-Test-playing opposition, with the rivalry against the United States being as strong in cricket as it is in other team sports. The match between these two nations is the oldest international fixture in cricket, having first been played in 1844. The ICC sanctions a few grounds in Canada to host official ODI's. The most famous Canadian cricketer is John Davison, who was born in Canada but raised in Australia and participated in the Cricket World Cup in 2003, 2007, and 2011. At the 2003 World Cup, Davison hit the fastest century in tournament history against the West Indies in a losing cause. In that World Cup, he also smashed a half-century at a strike rate of almost 200 against New Zealand. One year later, in the ICC Intercontinental Cup against the US, he proved the difference between the two sides, taking 17 wickets for 137 runs and scoring 84 runs. In the 2007 Cricket World Cup in the West Indies, John Davison scored the second-fastest half-century against New Zealand. Canada has participated in the 1979, 2003, and 2007 Cricket World Cups. Canada has traditionally had a strong Women's team. Also, The Canadian Under 19 team has competed in the Under 19 World Cup twice. In 2002, they were eliminated in the first round, meaning they competed in the plate competition, in which they did not win a game. They repeated this performance in the 2004 competition.

=== Early 2000s ===
In 2004, Canada lost all their games and finished in last place at the Six Nations Challenge in the United Arab Emirates. However, the team won the ICC Americas Championship in Bermuda shortly afterwards. Also in 2004, Canada participated in the first ICC Intercontinental Cup, finishing as runners-up to Scotland. The highlight of this tournament was the game against the US in Fort Lauderdale, Florida, when John Davison recorded the best match bowling figures since Jim Laker's 19 wickets against Australia in 1956.

In 2005, Canada again finished third in the ICC Trophy, which gained them official ODI status from 2006 until the 2009 ICC World Cup Qualifier, as well as qualifying them for the 2007 World Cup. Their performance in the Intercontinental Cup that year was not as good as in 2004 however, as they did not make it past the first round.

In 2006, Canada put in good performances in the four-day ICC Intercontinental Cup, beating Kenya by 25 runs and Bermuda by nine wickets. Still, their one-day form was a complete reversal, losing three times to Bermuda and Kenya, and a further loss to Zimbabwe. In August 2006, Canada took part in the Division 1 of the Americas Championship. They beat Argentina and long-time rivals the USA, but lost to the Cayman Islands and eventual winners Bermuda, and finished third, their worst performance so far in this tournament.

=== 2008 ===
In June and July 2008, Canada hosted Bermuda for three ODIs, and Intercontinental Cup matches against Bermuda and Scotland. In August, Canada traveled to Ireland for the World Twenty20 Qualification Tournament. Canada did not qualify for the World Twenty20, finishing 5th ahead of Bermuda. The ODIs and an Intercontinental Cup match were hampered by rain. In late summer of 2008, West Indies and Bermuda came to Canada to play One-Day Scotiabank Series with Canada. Canada defeated Bermuda to face West Indies in the Final. West Indies captain Chris Gayle smashed his sixteenth ODI century and led his side to an easy seven-wicket victory against Canada in the finals of the Scotiabank ODI Series at King City.

During the Scotiabank Series the talents of Rizwan Cheema were discovered – he would become the star of the first Al-Barakah T20 Canada. The tournament involved Canada, Pakistan, Sri Lanka and Zimbabwe. Canada lost all three of their matches. However, the loss to Zimbabwe came in a bowl-out. Sri Lanka was the eventual winners, defeating Pakistan in the Final. The tournament is expected to be played annually for the next four years.

In late November 2008, Canada participated in the Americas Championship in Florida, USA. The United States, after years of disarray, pulled together and won the championship. Canada finished 3rd on Net Run Rate behind Bermuda, as their match was washed out due to rain.

=== 2009 ===
Following bold management decisions which allowed Cricket Canada to sign seven players to central contracts in 2008, and increased ICC funding in 2009, allowed to continue a move designed to regularize training sessions with a core group of cricketers. For the likes of Rizwan Cheema, who had been working in a fast-food restaurant called Popeyes Chicken and Biscuits, quitting the day job to play cricket was an easy decision; others, such as investment banker Ashish Bagai, had to mull it over before signing, even during the 2008 financial crisis.

Following this, the team headed to Sri Lanka for a training camp that would forever change the face of Canadian Cricket. For the first time in its history, the players were exposed to a first-class environment and responded by dominating the opening stages of the 2009 Cricket World Cup Qualifier. This led to a second-place finish and an invitation to the 2011 Cricket World Cup

=== 2010 ===
In late January, the Canadian team embarked for Sri Lanka to play some warm-up matches ahead of the World Twenty20 Qualifiers in the UAE, which were to be followed by two ODIs and a four-day Intercontinental Cup match against Afghanistan. In January 2010, Canada's u19 team also made history as they upset heavily favored Zimbabwe in the first match of the 2010 u19 Cricket World Cup in New Zealand. The Canadians built off this all-round upset to finish a best-ever 11th place at the tournament. Also in January, Canada's men's team traveled to Sri Lanka to participate in the Sri Lanka Cricket Four Nations Cup with Sri Lanka 'A', Ireland, and Afghanistan. Canada again made history by producing the first-ever live broadcast of an associates cricket match. The production was well received and has paved the way for more such broadcasts in the future.

In February 2010 Canada participated in the 2010 ICC T20 Cricket World Cup qualification tournament in which they failed to register a win and were eliminated after the first round.

In March 2010, Cricket Canada Directors, for the first time, voted in president Ranjit Saini.

In April 2010, Cricket Canada declared its inability to host the 2012 Under-19 Cricket World Cup, which it had committed to hosting in 2007.

Canada emerged winless from an April tour of the Caribbean playing Jamaica in a 50-over and Twenty20 game, West Indies XI in a Twenty20 game and the West Indies in a One-day international.

Canada's presence in America also led to a relationship being developed with the West Indies Cricket Board. This included an invitation from WICB for Canada to participate in the Caribbean T20 tournament. Though not winning a game, the tournament was a success for Canada as a relationship was created with the Canadian Broadcasting Corporation. CBC webcast all of Canada's matches and had more substantial viewer ratings for this.

In June 2010, Canada stamped its authority in the Americas by winning all matches at the Americas Cup tournament in Bermuda and finishing finalists with winners USA in the Americas Twenty20. Canada also played Ireland in a drawn warm-up game in the Netherlands before World Cricket League Div 1 (Ireland's top-string team played Australia in Dublin).

Canada finished the year with some energy losing the 4-day match at home to Zimbabwe and Ireland but defeating top-ranked Ireland in an ODI in front of a packed house at the Toronto Cricket Club. Cricket was firmly back in Toronto, and the team responded.

The year ended with the Cricket Canada summer festival at Malton Cricket Club. A strong West Indies High-Performance Team (containing players with test and ODI players) split their matches with Canada in two hard-fought contests.

That November, the board decided to send the team to the World Cricket Academy in India. The 4-week trip included games in 4 cities for preparation ahead of the 2011 Cricket World Cup

=== 2011 ===
Canada played two major tournaments in the first part of 2011, the Caribbean T20 tournament. Participating for the second time in the West Indies domestic T20 competition, Canada defeated heavily favored Hampshire before fighting Trinidad and Tobago to the last ball in the opening two matches of the tournament.

After West Indies, Canada went to Dubai, splitting matches with Netherlands and Afghanistan before arriving at the 2011 Cricket World Cup. At this tournament, they won only their second ever match at a Cricket World Cup. The young Canadian team demonstrated steady performance. Hansra succeeded Bagai as captain of the team upon the latter's retirement

Canada finished 2011 with a string of losses in both ODI's and Intercontinental Cup Matches to Afghanistan (in Toronto) and Ireland (in Dublin). Canada finished tied for first with T&T and Afghanistan at the Etihad Airways Summer Cricket Festival (in Toronto)

=== 2012 ===
Canada participated in the Caribbean T20 tournament again in 2012, losing all 4 matches. Thousands of Canadian's watched the matches on Rogers Sportsnet ONE giving the team unprecedented domestic exposure.

Following the tournament, Canada participated in the 2012 T20 Cricket World Cup Qualification Tournament in UAE. Canada finished 6th in the game and did not qualify for the 2012 T20 Cricket World Cup.

In April, Ravin Moorthy was elected the new president of Cricket Canada, succeeding Ranjit Saini. Moorthy was joined on the board by Vimal Hardat, Amit Joshi, Charles Pais and Calvin Clarke. At this meeting, Newfoundland and Labrador were admitted to the Cricket Canada family as the 10th provincial member of the organization. The Canadian women's team won the ICC America's Division 1 T20 Tournament in April 2012. This tournament served as the preliminary round of the ICC T20 Women's Cricket World Cup, which will be played in 2014 in India. Canada has advanced to the next round of qualification.

Canada hired former West Indian Cricketer Gus Logie as its national head coach in May 2012.

In November 2012, Canada's men's team will travel to the USA to play the United States in the K.A. Auty Cup. The first contest between Canadian and American teams was in 1844.

=== 2023 ===
The Canada men's cricket team played in 2023 Cricket World Cup Qualifier Play-off and gained One Day International (ODI) status after 9 years. They also beat their fierce rivals in that tournament, United States.

=== 2025 ===
In January 2025, Canada Cricket announced the appointment of Salman Khan as their new CEO.

In March 2025, Salman Khan was charged by Calgary Police with one count of theft over $5,000 and one count of fraud over $5,000, relating to his time as president of the Calgary & District Cricket League. He denies the allegations. In October, Khan was suspended pending a "comprehensive review". His contract as CEO was terminated in December, following an investigation by the board of Cricket Canada.

=== 2026 ===
In February and March 2026, the Calgary home of a Cricket Canada board member was targeted in two separate shootings, believed to be related to his work for Cricket Canada. The board member resigned from Cricket Canada following the second shooting.

On 17 April 2026, CBC investigative news program The Fifth Estate published a report about Cricket Canada, raising allegations of corruption, links to organized crime (including the Bishnoi Gang), and match-fixing. Following publication of the report, the International Cricket Council froze funding to Cricket Canada. Shortly after, Cricket Canada's president Arwinder Khosa's Surrey home was the target of a shooting. Surrey Police confirmed an individual connected to the house had received extortion related threats prior to the shooting. On 4 June 2026, Khosa's home was the target of a second shooting, again believed by police to be related to extortion. The house was occupied at the time of the shooting, but nobody was injured. Also in June 2026, the ICC suspended Cricket Canada, citing the organization's "serious breaches of its membership obligations", though Canada is still able to host international matches and compete internationally under ICC oversight.

== International Involvement ==
Canada is one of the top associates of the International Cricket Council (ICC). Since 2008 a lot of cricket has been played in Canada involving international cricket teams from India, West Indies, Pakistan, Sri Lanka and Zimbabwe. Apart from this Canada has regular schedule of competitions with other associate members. In future there is a huge scope to become an international venue for ICC and other events.

Canada has hosted many India and Pakistan One day cricket matches in Toronto which were very successful in the past. Cricket Canada recently announced that it would be willing to host international games as a neutral venue if there are any situations that games cannot be conducted at any scheduled venues. This announcement came after Australia withdrew to travel Pakistan to play cricket after security concerns in Pakistan.

== Name changes ==
Original CCA logo, used before 2008.

Cricket Canada has had two different names since its foundation. They are:

- Canadian Cricket Association (1892–2008)
- Cricket Canada (2008 – present)

== Competitions ==
As well as being responsible for Canadian International sides, Cricket Canada organizes domestic inter-provincial cricket in Canada. In 2008, Cricket Canada introduced two domestic competitions that are Scotia Shield U-19 and National T20 Championship. National T20 Championship is a Twenty20 format competition with eight domestic teams. Until 2006, the Under-18 National Tournament in Canada was called as Canada Cup.

Cricket Canada's competitions:

- Scotiabank National T20 Championship
- Scotia Shield U-19
- Global T20 Canada
- Summerfest
- Canada Super60

== Women's cricket ==
The Canadian women's team made their international debut in September 2006 in a three-match series of one-day games against the Bermudian women's team to decide which team would represent the Americas region in the Women's Cricket World Cup Qualifier in Ireland in 2007. Canada started well, with a five-wicket win in the first win, but Bermuda came back with 24 run win in the second. The third game went down to the wire, with Bermuda triumphing by just 3 runs.

== Regional structure ==
Cricket Canada has five regions which encompass all 10 of Canada's provinces:

- Eastern – (Quebec, Nova Scotia, New Brunswick, PEI and Newfoundland & Labrador)
- Central – (Ontario)
- Prairies – (Manitoba and Saskatchewan)
- West – (Alberta)
- Pacific – (BC)

== Executive/Principals ==
Cricket Canada is governed by the following key individuals:

- President: Arwinder Khosa
- CEO:
- General secretary: Paramjit Shahi

== Grounds ==
- CAA Centre – Hosts Global T20 Canada. Have seating facility.
- Toronto Cricket, Skating and Curling Club – Old Cricket Ground. Last hosted in 2011.
- Maple Leaf Cricket Club - Regularly hosts Odi and T20I Series.

== Sponsorship ==
In 2010 Reebok signed a multi-year agreement with Cricket Canada to be the official apparel supplier of Cricket Canada. the deal commences in 2011 and will include the 2011 Cricket World Cup. Cricket Canada also has necessary sponsorship arrangements with Mercury Communications Group (web based marketing and communications), Sports Performance Centres (Athletic Therapy Services), Accent Impressions (Printing Services), Amino Vital (sports drinks), TitanGS (web design and marketing).

Also, as 2010 drew to a close, Etihad Airways joined Cricket Canada as a sponsor. The agreement spans several programs but focuses on cricket development initiatives. Teacher's Whisky also joined Cricket Canada in 2010 and has been featured prominently in the Caribbean T20 Tournament and the Etihad Summer Festival. In 2011 Reebok joined Cricket Canada as its apparel sponsor.

Cricket Canada also has sponsorship agreements with CIBC, Admiral Sportswear, Stage, and Screen.

== See also ==
- Canada national cricket team
- Sports in Canada
- Canadian women's cricket team
- Canadian national cricket captains
- British Columbia Mainland Cricket League
