= Cricket in Canada =

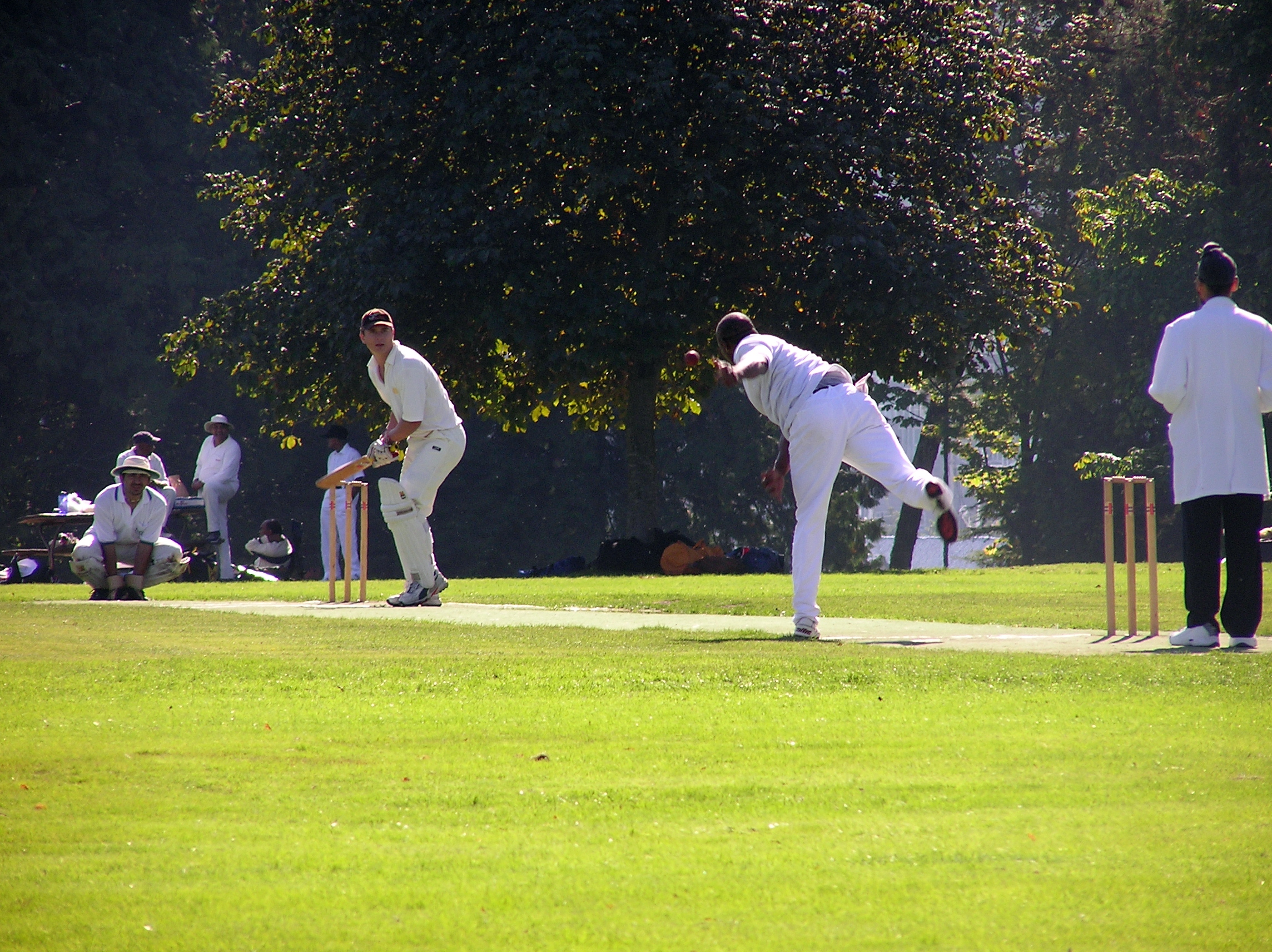
- Cricket match in progress in Vancouver's Stanley Park
- Country: Canada
- Governing body: Cricket Canada
- National teams: Men's national team; Women's national team
- First played: c. 1785

National competitions
- One Day International; Twenty20 International

Club competitions
- CIBC National Cricket League; Global T20 Canada

Cricket is a lesser, but growing, sport in Canada. Canada is unusual among the former Dominions of the British Empire in contrast to Australia, New Zealand, India, Pakistan, Sri Lanka, South Africa and the British West Indies where the sport is still strong.

== History ==
The earliest reports of cricket in Canada date from 1785, when games seem to have taken place in Montreal. The first reference to cricket being played on an organized basis is in 1834, when a club was founded in Toronto and there are reports of matches being played in Hamilton and Guelph.

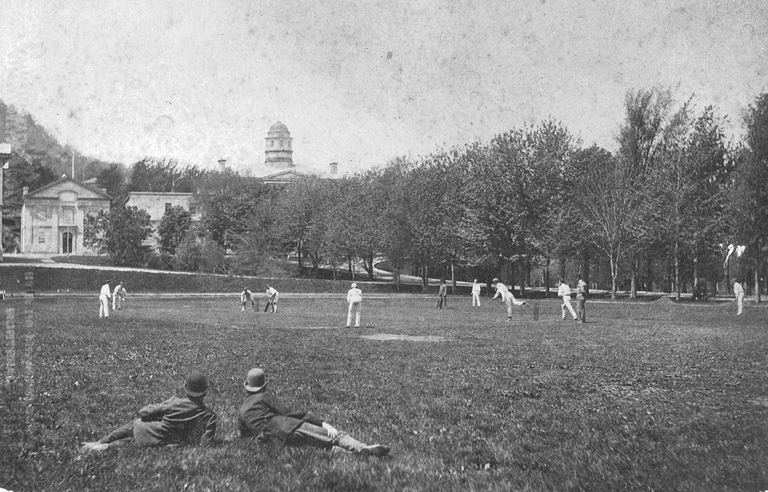
A cricket match in progress at McGill University in 1890

In 1840, there was a game between the Toronto and New York clubs. Similar strength teams played each other in 1844 in what has been called the first-ever cricket international. In 1867, Canadian prime minister John A. Macdonald and his cabinet declared cricket to be Canada’s first official sport. However, by 1891, academic Goldwin Smith described cricket as facing "great difficulties" due to its lengthy duration and unique turf requirements relative to baseball.

Cricket Canada is the governing body of the sport of cricket in Canada. It was established in 1892 and has its current headquarters in Toronto, Ontario. The British Columbia Mainland Cricket League was founded in 1914, and is now the second-largest cricket league in North America. Cricket Canada is Canada's representative at the International Cricket Council and has been an associate member of that body since 1968. It is included in the ICC Americas region. Prior to November 2007, the organization was known as the Canadian Cricket Association.

The most famous Canadian cricketer is John Davison, who was born in Canada and participated in the Cricket World Cup in both 2003 and 2007. At the 2003 World Cup, Davison hit the fastest century in tournament history against the West Indies even though Canada lost the ODI. In that World Cup he also scored a half-century at a strike rate of almost 200 against New Zealand. In the ICC Intercontinental Cup against the USA in 2004, he took 17 wickets for 137 and scored 84 runs. In the 2007 Cricket World Cup in the West Indies, Davison scored the second-fastest half-century against New Zealand. Canada has participated in the 1979, 2003, 2007 and 2011 Cricket World Cups.

== Domestic competitions ==
The first Canadian Dominion inter-provincial cricket tournament was held in Montreal in the month of August 1964. One of the best matches of the tournament was Manitoba defeating British Columbia at Lower Canada College grounds in Montreal. Cricket Canada organizes domestic inter-provincial cricket in Canada. In 2008, Cricket Canada has introduced two domestic competitions that are Scotia Shield U-19 and National T20 Championship. National T20 Championship is a Twenty20 format competition with eight domestic teams. Until 2006, the Under-18 National Tournament in Canada was called as Canada Cup.

In 2009, a new professional Twenty20 league was formed. Known as the TJT National Cricket League (TJT NCL), the league initially consisted of six teams – the Warriors, Titans, Gladiators, Royals, Chiefs, and Kings. About 90 professional cricket players were drafted from across Canada in the inaugural draft. The inaugural season commenced play August 7, 2009 at G. Ross Lord Park in Toronto. The six teams played each other in a round robin match over the season which lasted six weeks. The top four teams Gladiators, Warriors, Titans, and Kings played in semi-finals and the final match was played on September 27, 2009 between the Titans and the Kings. The 2009 TJT NCL championship was won by the Kings.

In 2012, the CIBC National Cricket League was introduced by Cricket Canada as the new major domestic competition played mid-summer in Toronto. Consisting of five franchise teams to represent cricketing regions across the country; Pacific Edge (BC), Western Stallions (AB), Prairie Fire (MB/SK), Central Shield (ON), Eastern Fury (Atlantic – QC, NB, PE, NS, NL). The NCL is broken up into two competition formats, a T20 competition and a One Day competition.

In February 2018, the International Cricket Council (ICC) sanctioned the Global T20 Canada, the first franchise-based Twenty20 league in North America.

Domestic competitions in Canada include:

- CIBC National Cricket League
- Scotia Shield U-19
- TJT National Cricket League
- Atlantic T20
- Maritime M40 Championship

=== Cricket grounds ===
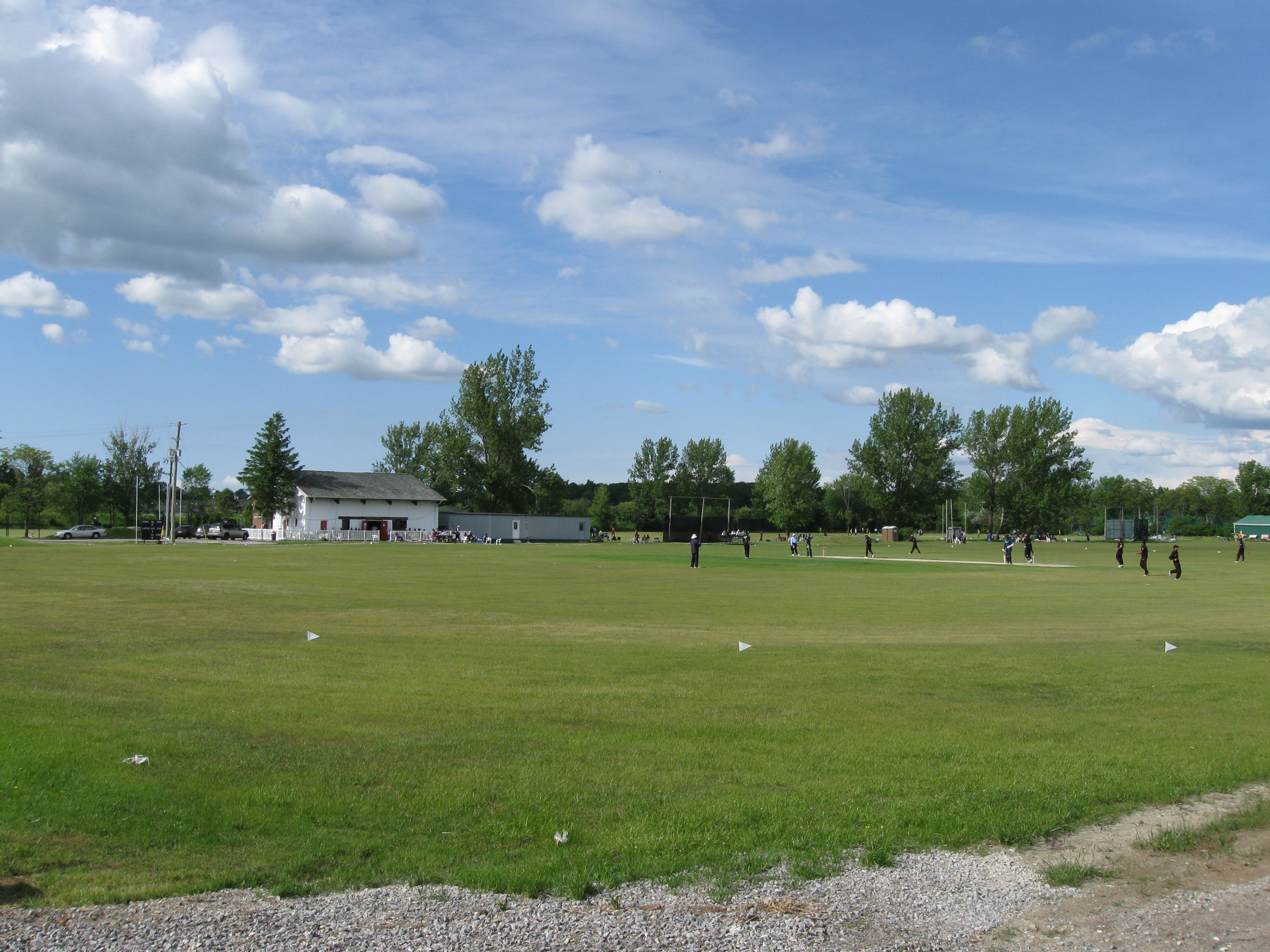
The Maple Leaf Cricket Club is one of two grounds in the country approved to host official One Day Internationals.

Until September 2006, Toronto Cricket, Skating and Curling Club Ground was the only ground in Canada approved to host official One Day Internationals. It was joined at this date by the Maple Leaf Cricket Club in King City, Ontario.

== National team ==
While Canada is not sanctioned to play Test matches, the team does take part in One Day International matches and also in first-class games (in the ICC Intercontinental Cup) against other non-Test-playing opposition. Its rivalry against the United States cricket team is considered as strong in cricket as it is in other team sports. The match between these two nations is the oldest international fixture in cricket. Having first been played in 1844, it predates the modern Olympics by more than 50 years.

Canada is one of the teams in Division 1 of Associate Members of International Cricket Council who has One Day International and T20 International status.

Canadian cricket has tended to take a lower profile than most other sports. The team tends to be composed of expatriates from other cricketing nations e.g. the 2003 World Cup squad for Canada contained players born in Sri Lanka, India, Pakistan, and the West Indies.

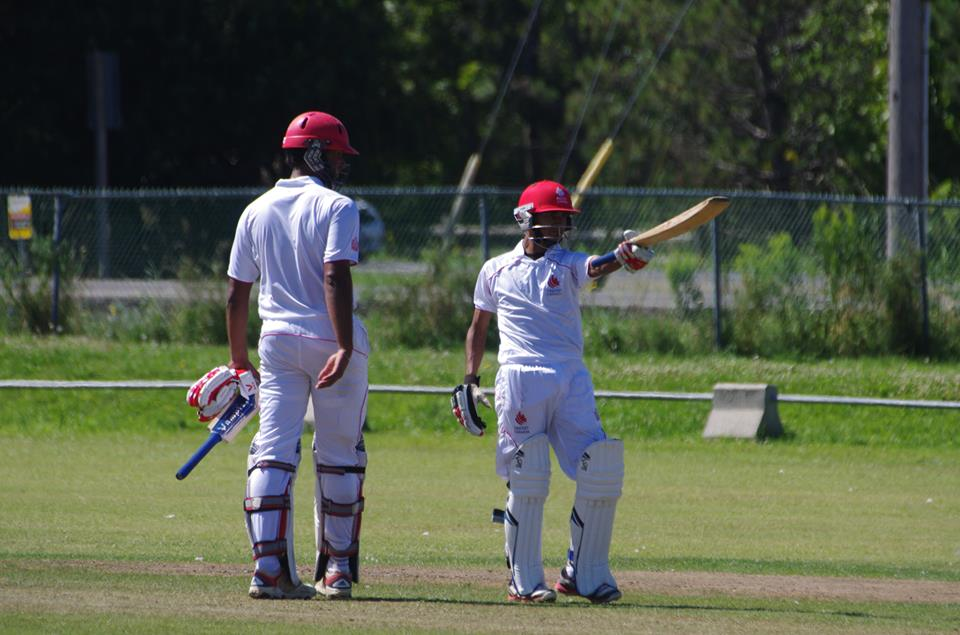
Members of the Canada national cricket team during a cricket match against the Netherlands.

=== Men's ===
Canada Senior Men's team qualified in April 2009 at the ICC World Cup qualifier held in South Africa to compete in 2011 World Cup, their third World Cup appearance in a row.

=== Women's ===
Canada has traditionally had a strong Women's team. Also The Canadian Under 19 team have competed in the Under 19 World Cup on three occasions. In 2002, they were eliminated in the first round, meaning they competed in the plate competition, in which they did not win a game. They repeated this performance in the 2004 competition. The Canadian u19 team competed in the 2014 u19 World Cup in Dubai, finishing 15th.

The Canadian women's cricket team made their international debut in September 2006 in a three match series of one-day games against Bermuda to decide which team would represent the Americas region in the Women's Cricket World Cup Qualifier in Ireland in 2007. Canada started well, with a five wicket win in the first win, but Bermuda came back with 24 run win in the second. The third game went down to the wire, with Bermuda triumphing by just 3 runs.

== See also ==
- Sport in Canada
- List of Canadian first-class cricketers
