= British Columbia Mainland Cricket League =

The British Columbia Mainland Cricket League (BCMCL) was founded in 1914 by seven founding member clubs. It is a competitive cricket league and is known for its scenic cricket grounds, most notably Stanley Park. According to the league's president, Inamul Desai, the BCMCL is the largest cricket league in North America.

== Organization ==
In 2019, the league hosted 89 teams (including junior teams), which played 1100 games in the regular season, which lasts from the end of April to mid-September. The teams are organized into nine divisions. At the end of the season, playoffs against the top two teams in each division are held, in which teams compete to move up in the division. Teams that end the season at the bottom of their division are relegated to the lower level.

== See also ==
- Canada national cricket team
- Cricket in Canada
