= Lou Lefaive =

Canadian sports administrator and civil servant (1928–2002)

- Born: February 13, 1928; Windsor, Ontario, Canada
- Died: July 4, 2002 (aged 74); Ottawa, Ontario, Canada
- Burial place: Beechwood Cemetery
- Education: University of Ottawa
- Occupations: Sports administrator, civil servant
- Known for: Sport Canada, Hockey Canada, National Sport and Recreation Centre, Canadian Figure Skating Association, Sport Marketing Canada, Canadian Paralympic Committee

Louis Ernest Lefaive (February 13, 1928 – July 4, 2002) was a Canadian sports administrator and civil servant. He served in multiple executive roles which included, the director of Fitness and Amateur Sport, director of Sport Canada, president of the National Sport Recreation Centre, president of the Canadian Paralympic Committee, chairman and president of Hockey Canada, executive director of the Canadian Figure Skating Association, and executive director of Sport Marketing Canada.

Lefaive was an original member of the Canada Games council, and was involved in planning the inaugural Arctic Winter Games. His involvement in Hockey Canada included negotiations for the 1972 Summit Series, the 1974 Summit Series, and the 1981 Canada Cup; and planning for the Canada men's national ice hockey team and the Canada men's national junior ice hockey team. He was described as "key builder of the Canadian sport system" by The Globe and Mail, and "had an exceptional ability to bring government and sport together, enabling the development of some of the most successful sports policies", according to the Canadian Paralympic Committee.

== Early life and career ==
Lefaive was born on February 13, 1928, in Windsor, Ontario, the son of Achille and Aurore Lefaive. He played football, basketball and softball while growing up in Windsor. He attended University of Ottawa, then later coached basketball at the university and St. Patrick's College in Ottawa.

Lefaive was an original council member for the Canada Games that began in 1967, and was named a director of the Canadian Olympic Association.

== Director of Fitness and Amateur Sport ==
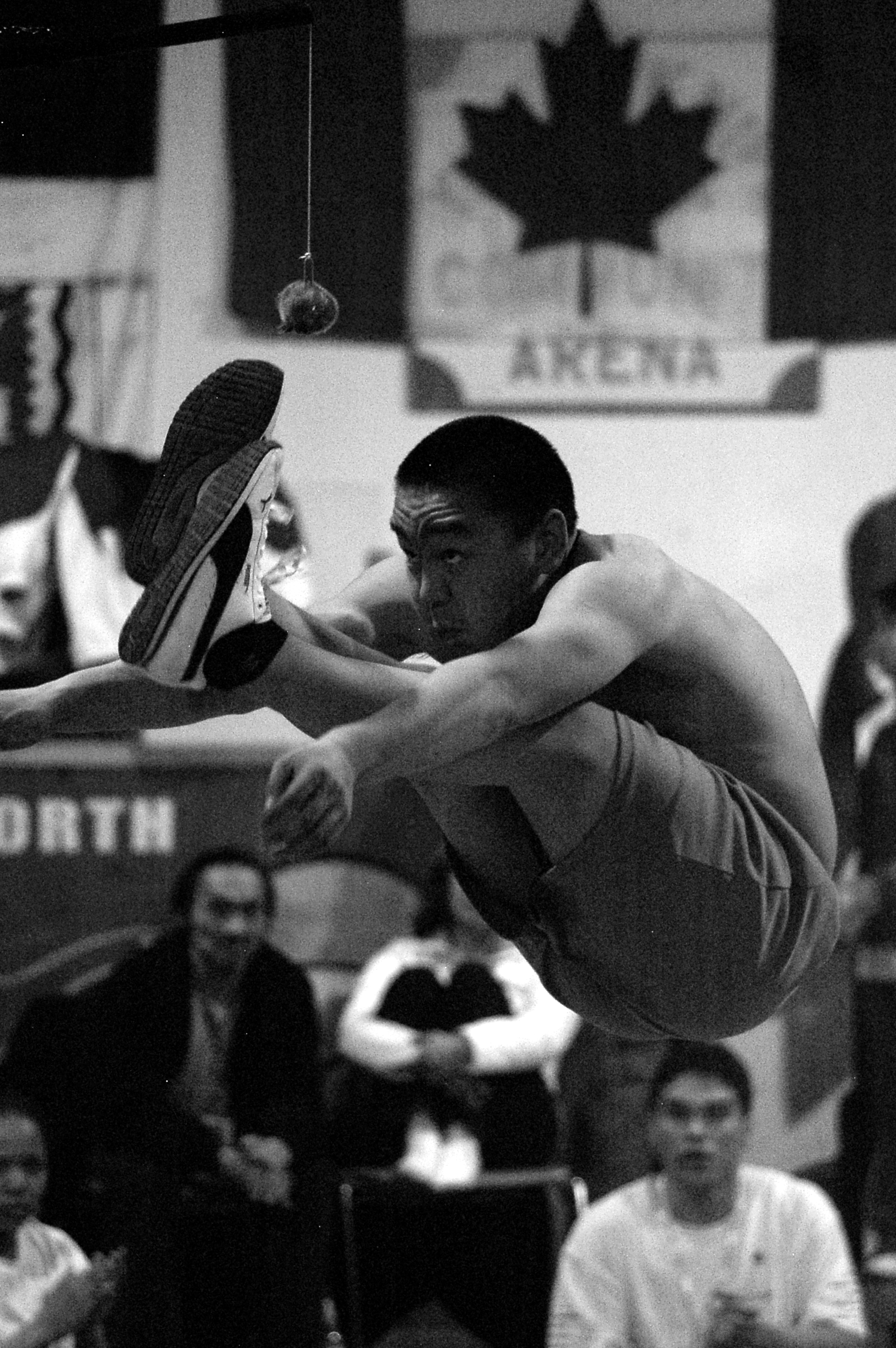
Example of Arctic Winter Games competition (Two-foot high kick)

Lefaive was appointed director of the Directorate of Fitness and Amateur Sport in 1968. He developed a working relationship with John Munro, the Minister of Health and Welfare, and was able to influence the government's policies on sport. Lefaive urged Munro to act on recommendations from the directorate before being tabled in the House of Commons of Canada. In 1968, Lefaive recommended that the directorate set national sport policies with the rationale it was staffed with full-time civil servants who were experts in physical education and public administration, instead of the National Advisory Council on Fitness who were volunteers. He later suggested the foundation of the Coaching Association of Canada.

On February 21, 1969, Hockey Canada began operations as a separate entity from the Canadian Amateur Hockey Association (CAHA), and Lefaive was appointed to the initial board of directors with the goal of the Canada men's national ice hockey team defeating the Soviet Union national ice hockey team, and assist in planning the upcoming 1970 Ice Hockey World Championships hosted in Canada. After a dispute with the International Ice Hockey Federation (IIHF) over Canada using professional players, Canada withdrew from international competition when Earl Dawson announced, "We will not return until the rules permit us to enter a team that is truly representative of Canadian hockey, so we can play our best players as all other countries do".

Lefaive was involved in planning the inaugural Arctic Winter Games in 1970. At the event's closing ceremonies he stated, "we're leaving behind a legacy of people who are, or have been, involved and certainly now committed to the positive values that flow from sports competition". He announced plans that the games would be held every two years.

== Director of Sport Canada ==
The Directorate of Fitness and Amateur Sport was split into Sport Canada and Recreation Canada in 1971. Lefaive explained that Sport Canada would be concerned with the competitive aspects of sports, and Recreation Canada would be concerned with getting more Canadians to participate in sports for pleasure. He served as the director of Sport Canada until 1974.

In June 1971, Lefaive felt that universities were becoming less opposed to third party scholarships for athletes, and hoped it would relieve the financial burden of bidding for athletes to attend their school. Sport Canada offered 100 scholarships to athletes at that time, and he hoped to broaden the scholarship base by increasing participation in sport. He felt that having more people involved would increase the talent pool, and stated that "the quality of an athlete is the consequence of participation, not the goal".

In February 1972, Lefaive became part of the board of directors for the Sport Federation of Canada, via his role in Sport Canada. He also helped develop the ParticipACTION program in 1972.

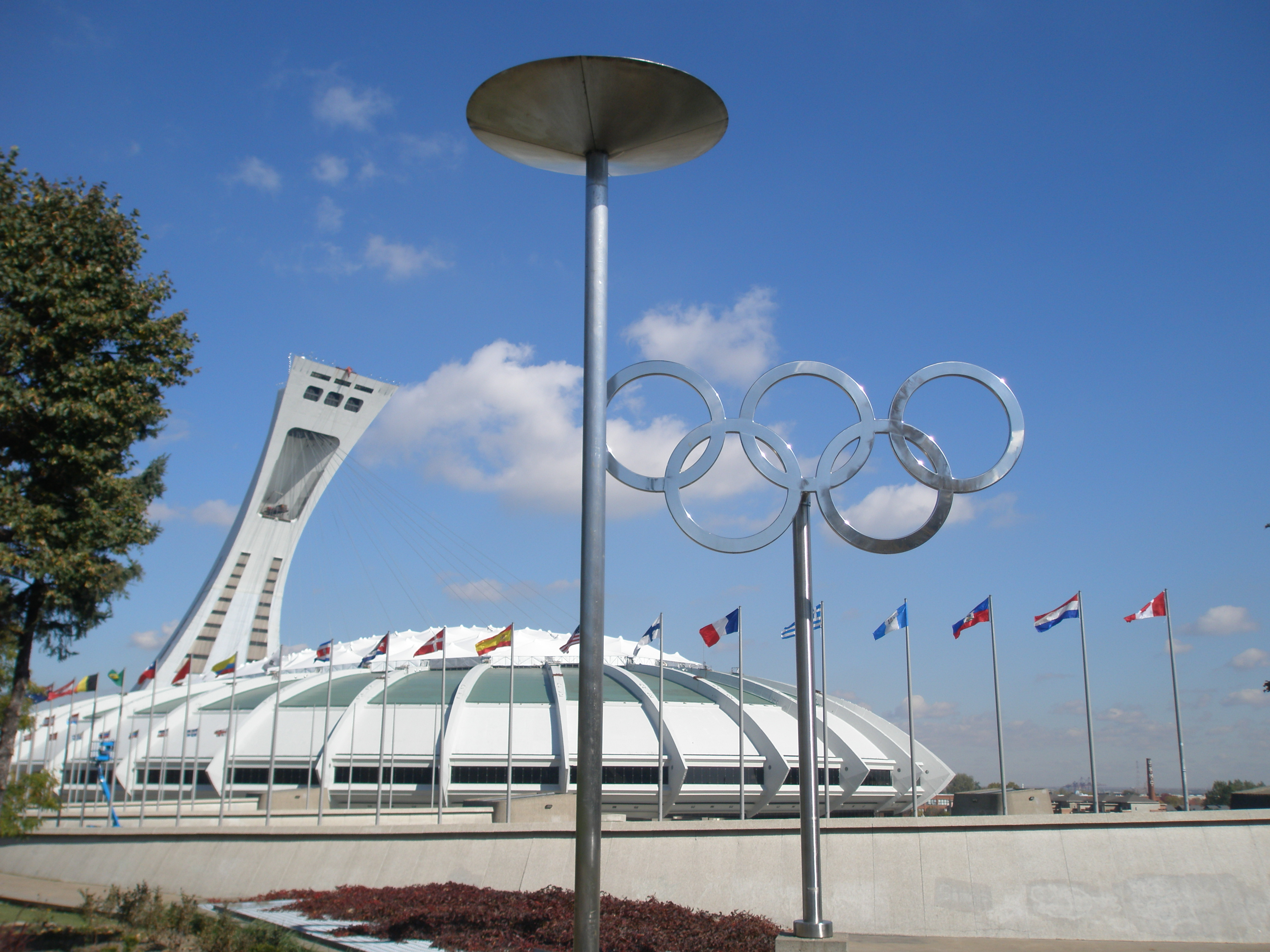
Olympic Stadium in Montreal was the main venue for the 1976 Summer Olympics.

In 1973, Lefaive called for amateur sport leaders in Canada to be more vocal in supporting the planned 1976 Summer Olympics in Montreal. In response to the protests against the cost of Canada hosting the Olympic Games, he said that "amateur sport was criticized on economic grounds", which "ignored the true value of international competition".

Lefaive was acting as the assistant deputy Minister of Amateur Sport, from July 18 to September 1, 1973, until an appointment took effect. In September 1973, he attended as a government observer to the renegotiation of the professional-amateur agreement between the National Hockey League (NHL) represented by Clarence Campbell, and the CAHA represented by Jack Devine.

On November 30, 1973, Marc Lalonde the Canadian Minister of Health and Welfare, named Lefaive the president designate of a proposed corporation which would include all amateur sport bodies. Lefaive had made a recommendation for the foundation of a National Sport and Recreation Centre.

=== Canadian international hockey ===
Lefaive remained part of the board of directors for Hockey Canada while serving as the director of Sport Canada. He was part of the Canadian delegation attending the 1971 Ice Hockey World Championships, which began discussions on a possible return of the national team to international competition. He expected the Japanese Olympic Committee to invite Canada to ice hockey at the 1972 Winter Olympics, and that Hockey Canada would consider without indicating any acceptance or refusal.

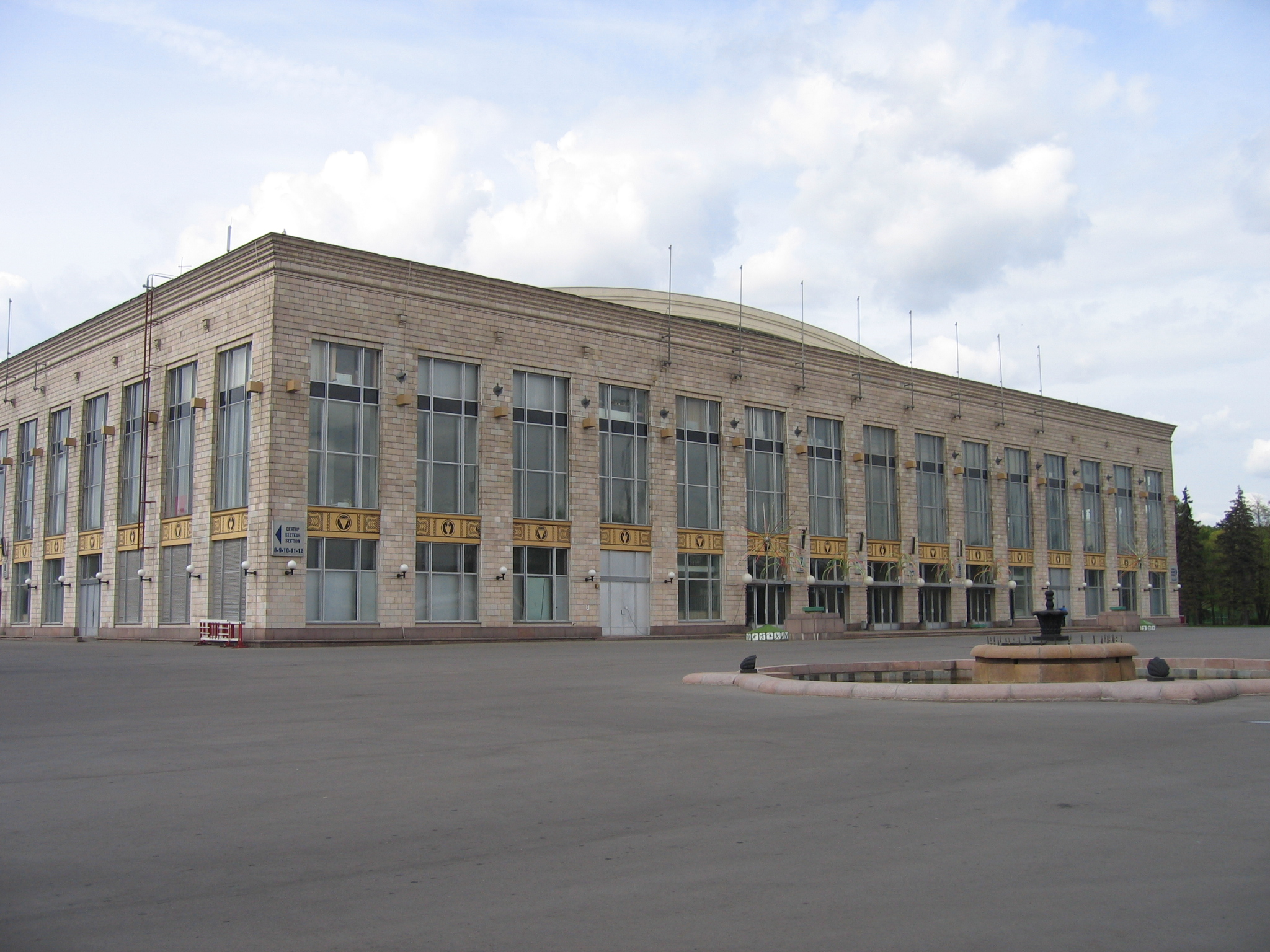
The Soviet Union's home games of the 1972 and 1974 Summit Series were played at the Palace of Sports of the Central Lenin Stadium in Moscow.

In February 1972, the Canadian Bureau of Public Affairs empowered Joe Kryczka, president of the CAHA, Charles Hay chairman of Hockey Canada, and Lefaive to oversee diplomatic efforts to return Canada to international ice hockey, and gave them needed assistance from Canadian embassies in Europe, and specifically the Embassy of Canada in Moscow. Kryczka, Hay and Lefaive went to Prague in April 1972 to finalize a deal with the Soviet Union Ice Hockey Federation for what became the 1972 Summit Series. While in Prague, Lefaive and Doug Fisher spoke with Derek Holmes who was coaching the Switzerland men's national ice hockey team, and convinced him to join Hockey Canada as its technical director to help build the national team.

After the Summit Series was announced, Lefaive stated that future agreements to have international hockey events with professional players did not mean Canada would return to the Ice Hockey World Championships or ice hockey at the Olympic Games. He noted that obstacles were the timing of the events overlapping with the National Hockey League (NHL) season, and the cost of traveling to Europe from North America. He said Canada would ask for the World Championships to be scheduled in May after NHL playoffs, or in September during professional training camps.

In April 1973, Lefaive and Gordon Juckes met with Andrei Starovoytov from the Soviet Union Ice Hockey Federation to discuss the possibility of another series. Lefaive and Juckes went to Helsinki in April 1974, for another round of discussions. The final agreement for the 1974 Summit Series was signed, and officially announced on April 26, 1974.

In 1974, Lefaive was the chairman of Hockey Canada's international committee, and represented Hockey Canada at meetings for international competitions. He met with the CAHA, NHL, World Hockey Association (WHA) and European countries regarding a potential World Cup of Hockey in open competition. He sat on the committee for planning the 1974 Summit Series. He supported adding the WHA Players' Association representative Ron Roberts to the committee to give the players a voice, despite opposition from Ben Hatskin who owned the Winnipeg Jets.

== National Sport Recreation Centre ==
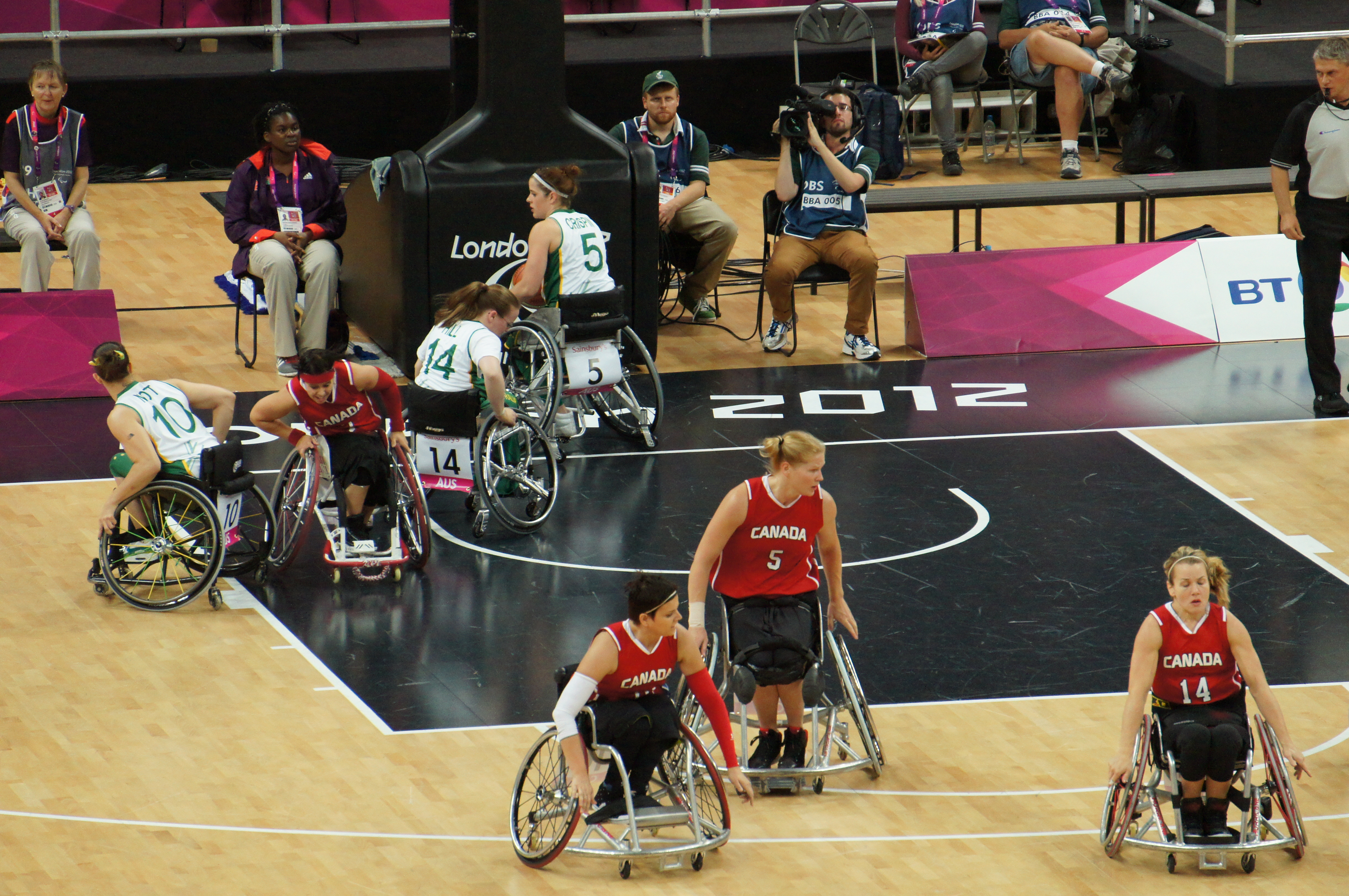
Lefaive was president of the Canadian Paralympic Committee, which included national teams for wheelchair basketball.

The National Sport and Recreation Centre began operations on June 17, 1974, with Lefaive as its president. He described the vision of the new centre as providing direct administrative and technical assistance to amateur sport organizations, and helping those volunteer organizations achieve more. He said, "right now amateur sports are at the mercy of the government and big business" but the centre would give amateur sports a powerful lobby. As president, he attended meetings of the International Gymnastics Federation on behalf of the Canadian Gymnastics Federation.

From 1976 to 1977, Lefaive served as the first president of the Canadian Paralympic Committee and presided over the government's coordinating committee for the Sports for the Physically Disabled. Canada had recently hosted the 1976 Summer Paralympics in Toronto, and created a support network for its athletes with disabilities. He oversaw the allocation of government funds for the Canadian Wheelchair Sports Association, the Canadian Association for Disabled Skiing, the Canadian Amputee Sports Association and the Canadian Blind Sports Association.

In October 1977, the government was debating the future format of the Canada Games from 1981 onward. Lefaive wanted the games to remain targeted towards developmental athletes, since he felt there was adequate competition for higher-level athletes. He cautioned that raising the level of competition at the Canada Games would lead to the more populated Canadian provinces dominating the events.

== Return to Sport Canada ==
On April 13, 1978, Lefaive was appointed by Iona Campagnolo to return as director of Sport Canada, and replace Roger Jackson who resigned. Campagnolo stated that Lefaive's returning came at a time when the national sport policy was nearing completion. Lefaive wanted to see Sport Canada be more interactive in the sport community, and a closer understanding of common objectives. He said, "I think I can serve best in the area of developing better dialogue with such organizations as the national sport governing bodies, the Canadian Olympic Association, the Canadian Interuniversity Athletics Union (CIAU), and particularly, the provinces". After the 1979 Canadian federal election, he expected government spending restraints and adjustments in his programs. He had mixed feelings on Canada's results at the 1979 Pan American Games. He said Canada need to take a long look at whether results were worth the tax payer's money, and suggested that the money might be better spent going to competitions in Europe.

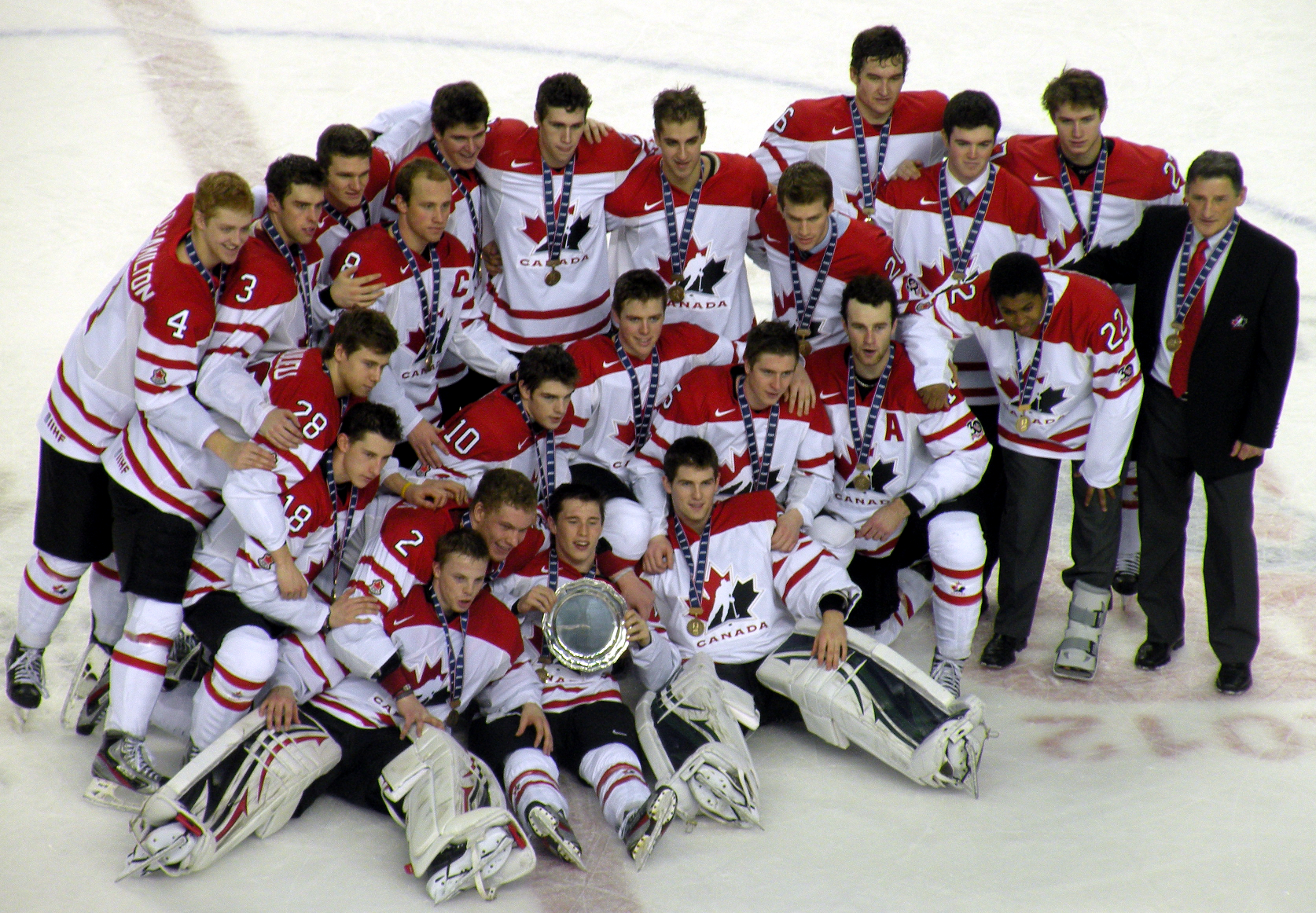
Hockey Canada and the CAHA had an ongoing power struggle over the Canada men's national junior ice hockey team (pictured in 2012).

Lefaive was nominated to return to the Hockey Canada board of directors in September 1978. In October 1978, the CAHA used its International Ice Hockey Federation (IIHF) membership to block a series of international exhibition games between the WHA and Europeans teams, that were arranged by Hockey Canada. The CAHA was upset about the WHA not paying development fees when it signed players from junior ice hockey teams in Canada. Lefaive felt the CAHA should take legal action against the WHA, instead of using its IIHF veto as leverage.

In a publicized dispute with the CAHA in January 1979, Lefaive said that Hockey Canada would stop organizing teams for the Olympic Games and World Championships, because "the CAHA is just dragging its heels" and was not fully committed to the national team. CAHA president Gord Renwick said the threat was an excuse when the 1976 Canada Cup was not profitable. Later in 1979, Lefaive began plans for regularly scheduled Canada Cup tournaments as of 1980.

Lefaive resigned as the director of Sport Canada in January 1980.

=== Chairman of Hockey Canada ===
Lefaive was named chairman of Hockey Canada in April 1979. He agreed with the CAHA to move forward planning the 1980 Canada Cup, but still disputed who had control of the Canada men's national junior ice hockey team. The problems with the lack of development payments ended with the NHL–WHA merger. He felt that Hockey Canada's links to the private sector would help establish a permanent national men's team, and finance the national junior team at the World Juniors. In October 1979, Lefaive announced a proposal to operate an elite CIAU hockey league in Canada funded by Hockey Canada and the private sector. The aims were to encourage the best student athletes to remain in Canada instead of accepting scholarships in the United States, and act to as a feeder program for the national men's team.

In November 1979, Hockey Canada and the CAHA were in disagreement again over the national junior team. The CAHA chose not to send a team to the 1980 World Junior Ice Hockey Championships, and Lefaive stated the decision would hurt Canada's reputation. The CAHA stated it withdrew because funding from Sport Canada was denied, whereas Sport Canada said the request came too late.

== President of Hockey Canada ==
Lefaive became the first full-time salaried president of Hockey Canada on January 22, 1980. He made it a priority to have a CIAU super league operational by the 1980–81 school season, and suggested it would cost an extra C$25,000 per team. He continued preparations for the 1980 Canada Cup, despite the ongoing Soviet–Afghan War, although he received a request from Steve Paproski, the Minister of Amateur Sport, to review its relationship with the Soviet Union team. Lefaive deferred a decision until after a potential boycott of the 1980 Summer Olympics hosted in the Soviet Union. He arranged arena and television contracts with escape clauses if politics caused any problems. He was optimistic the event would succeed event without Soviet participation.

Despite not winning a medal in ice hockey at the 1980 Winter Olympics, Lefaive committed to continue the national team program and a university hockey league. He wanted to keep the nucleus of the team together for international tournaments such as the Izvestia Cup in Moscow, and the Rudé právo tournament in Czechoslovakia, and add players for the upcoming World Championships. Lefaive was critical of the NHL for giving nearly twice the financial assistance to the United States men's national ice hockey team instead of Team Canada, and felt that the NHL owed more to Canada.

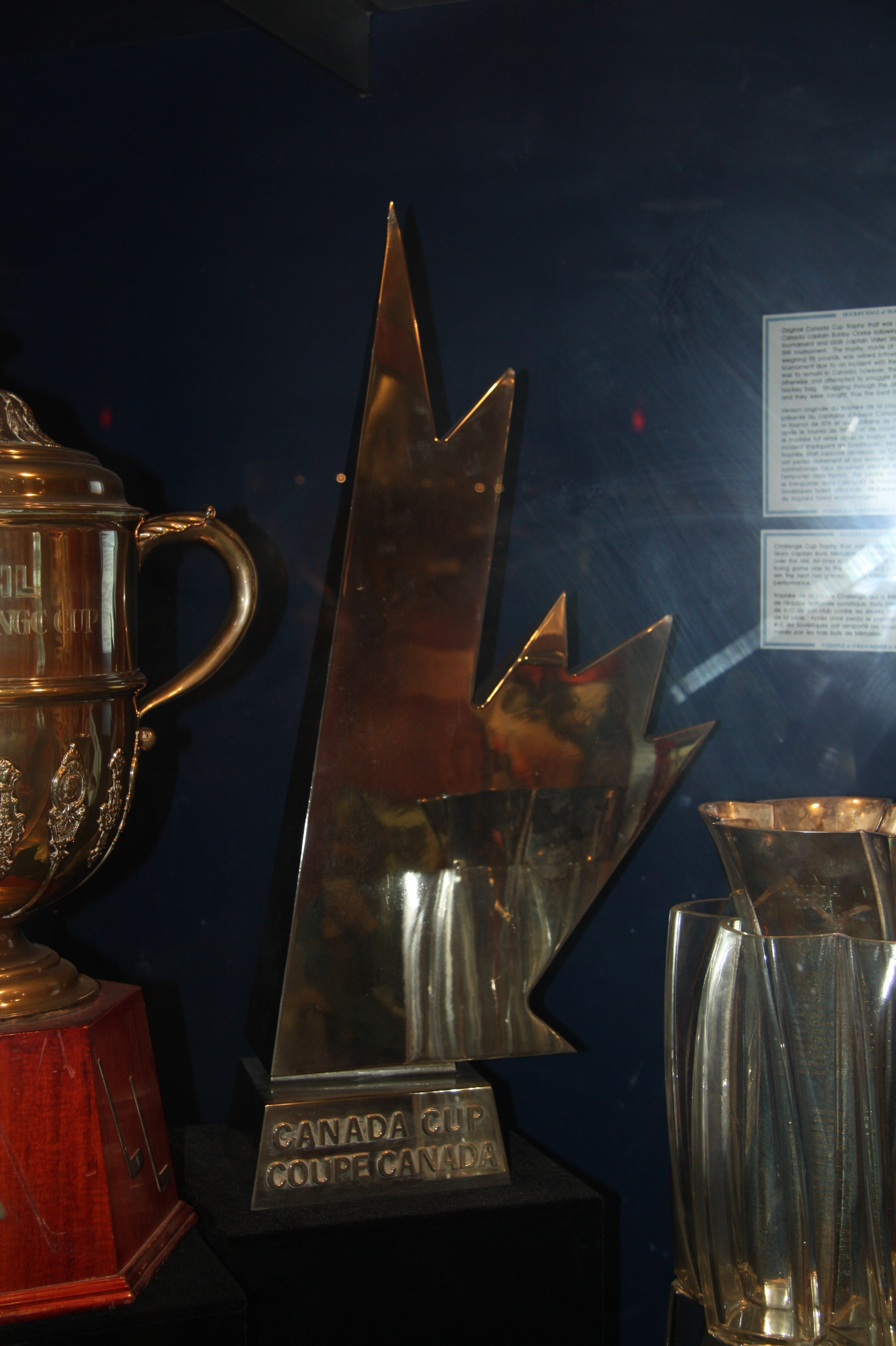
The Canada Cup trophy

On April 30, 1980, Lefaive confirmed cancellation of the 1980 Canada Cup. The Canadian Press reported that NHL players were opposed to Soviet Union participating due to the Soviet-Afghan War. He reported that Hockey Canada lost $600,000 income due to the cancellation, which would have ensured its financial stability. He accepted responsibility for cancelling the 1980 Canada Cup due to lack of sponsors and public opinion on world events, and hoped the event could be held in 1981. He felt the Soviets would play in 1981 to redeem their loss to the Americans at the 1980 Winter Olympics.

In a January 1981 interview, Lefaive said that the cancellation of the 1980 Canada Cup left Hockey Canada without money to fund a national team which went on hold for a year. He began planning in summer 1981 for ice hockey at the 1984 Winter Olympics, and expected the national men's team to be composed of junior and college players. He also planned on sending a team to the 1981 Winter World Student Games. Hockey Canada proposed sending the University of Alberta Golden Bears supplemented with players from other schools. The plan was threatened when threatened to pull out if loaning players coincided with the Canada West playoffs.

The 1981 Canada Cup went ahead as scheduled, and was won by the Soviet Union. After the victorious team was prevented from taking the trophy home to the Soviet Union by Alan Eagleson, Winnipeg businessman George Smith planned on presenting a copy of the Canada Cup trophy to the Soviet players at Portage and Main. Lefaive threatened a lawsuit for copyright infringement if a replica of the Canada Cup was made, but later said "If someone wants to send $11,000 worth of nickel to Moscow that's not my business".

== Later career ==
Lefaive served as the executive director of the Canadian Figure Skating Association from 1983 to 1986, and served as a board member of the Sports Federation of Canada. He began new marketing campaigns for figure skating, and managed its amateur development. In November 1984, he proposed collaborating on a series of events with the United States Figure Skating Association to strengthen North American competition and its talent. He wanted athletes to remain in North America, instead of travelling to Europe for competition. He emphasized the "spirit of helping each other" especially at the amateur levels of figure skating. Lefaive departed the Canadian Figure Skating Association to pursue opportunities in sports marketing, and was succeeded as executive director by David Dore on January 20, 1986.

Lefaive served as the executive director of Sport Marketing Canada from 1986 to 1992, and was president of the Sport Marketing Council. He said in a September 1988 interview, "sport is too important for government not to be involved, but the days when we merely tapped government as the milk cow are gone". He felt that sports organizations needed to raise more funds from their members and innovative marketing strategies. He expected corporate funding to grow in the next four years and suggested that sports organizations set a target of 50% funding from private sources.

== Personal life and death ==
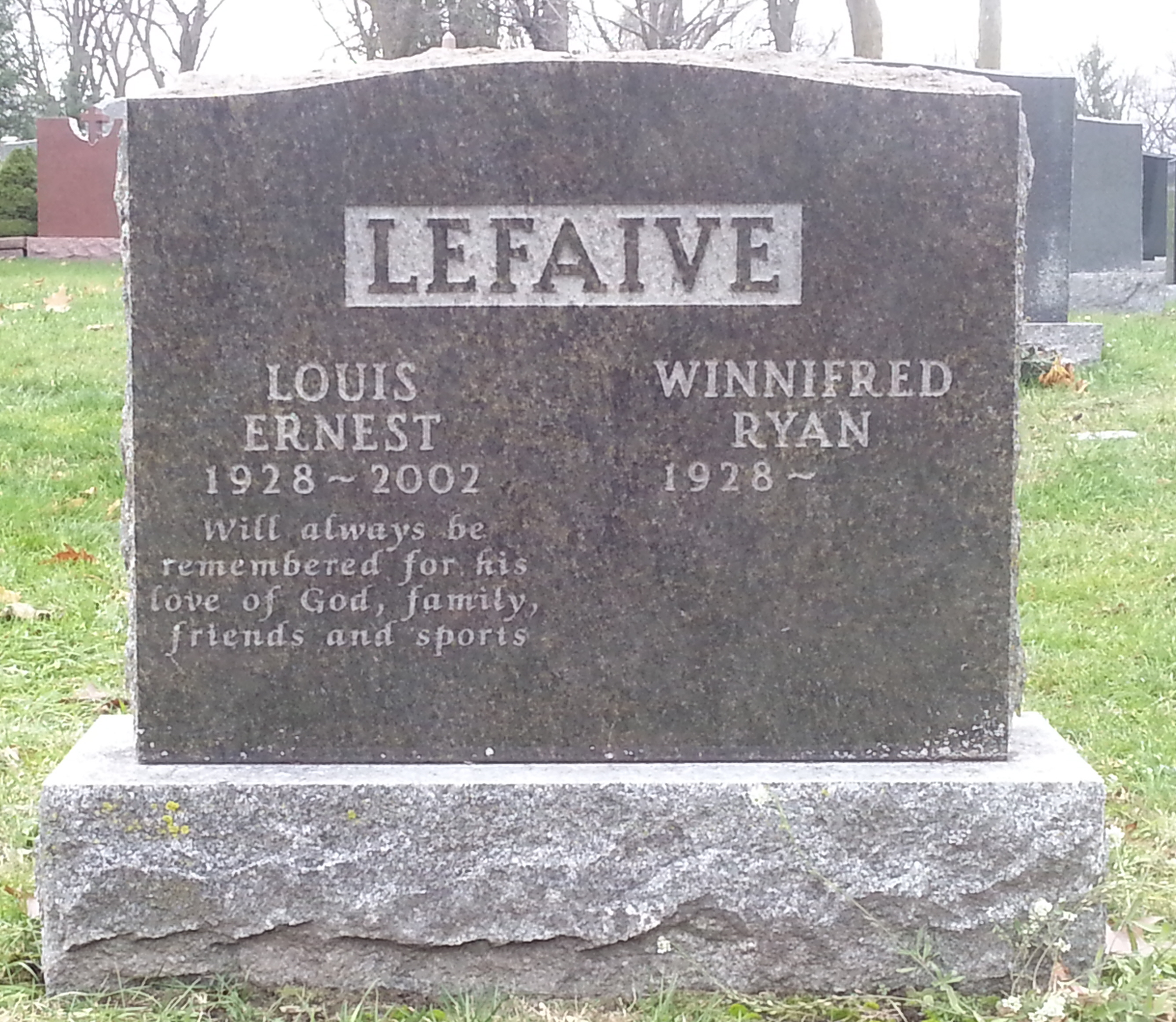
Lefaive's grave stone at Beechwood Cemetery

Lefaive was a devout Catholic. He and his wife Winnifred had four daughters. He died on July 4, 2002, in Ottawa at age 74, and was interred at Beechwood Cemetery in Ottawa.

== Legacy and honours ==
Lefaive was an honorary life member of the Canadian Gymnastics Federation. He was described by The Globe and Mail as a "key builder of the Canadian sport system". The Canadian Paralympic Committee said he "had an exceptional ability to bring government and sport together, enabling the development of some of the most successful sports policies".

== Bibliography ==
- Macintosh, Donald; Whitson, David (1990). The Game Planners: Transforming Canada's Sport System. Montreal, Quebec: McGill–Queen's University Press. pp. 17–18. ISBN 0-7735-1211-X – via Google Books.
- Dubin, Charles (1990). Commission of Inquiry into the Use of Drugs and Banned Practices Intended to Increase Athletic Performance (PDF). Ottawa, Ontario: Government of Canada Publishing Centre. ISBN 0-660-13610-4.
- Oliver, Greg (2017). Father Bauer and the Great Experiment: The Genesis of Canadian Olympic Hockey. Toronto, Ontario: ECW Press. ISBN 978-1-77041-249-1.
- Macintosh, Donald (1987). Sport and Politics in Canada. Montreal, Quebec: McGill–Queen's University Press. p. 57. ISBN 0-7735-0665-9 – via Google Books.
- Macintosh, Donald; Hawes, Michael (1994). Sport and Canadian Diplomacy. Montreal & Kingston: McGill-Queen's University Press. ISBN 0-7735-1161-X.
- Houston, William; Shoalts, David (1993). Eagleson: The Fall of a Hockey Czar. Whitby, Ontario: McGraw-Hill Ryerson Ltd. ISBN 0-07-551706-X.
- McKinley, Michael (2014). It's Our Game: Celebrating 100 Years Of Hockey Canada. Toronto, Ontario: Viking Press. ISBN 978-0-670-06817-3.
- Ferguson, Bob (2005). Who's Who in Canadian Sport, Volume 4. Markham, Ontario: Fitzhenry & Whiteside Ltd. ISBN 1-55041-855-6.
