= Ski Montcalm =

Canadian ski resort

Montcalm Ski Resort
- Location in Quebec
- Location: Rawdon, Quebec, Canada
- Nearest city: Montreal: 82 km (50 mi)
- Coordinates: 46.041°N 73.831°W
- Vertical: 140 m (460 ft)
- Top elevation: 330 m (1,080 ft)
- Base elevation: 190 m (623 ft)
- Trails: 29 Total; 9 - easy 12 - difficult 8 - very difficult
- Lift system: 6 total 5 chairlifts, 1 magic carpet
- Lift capacity: 7,000 skiers/hr
- Snowfall: 279 cm (110 in) per year
- Website: Ski Montcalm

Ski Montcalm is an alpine ski resort in Rawdon, Québec, Canada. The mountain, which is in the Lanaudière region, has operated since 1969. The ski area is distributed on three mountainsides, with twenty-nine trails. Ski Montcalm is a member of the Quebec Ski Area Association (ASSQ).

== History ==
Ski Montcalm was opened by Tadek Barnowski in 1969, just a few years after immigrating from Poland. Ski Montcalm is one of the few hills that remains family-owned, Barnowski having passed the ownership down to his children, John and Joanna.

A covered ramp was installed before the beginning of the 2019 ski season, allowing young skiers to get up the training hill more comfortably. This type of technology is a first in Canada. A similar covered ramp was installed at Chamonix in France.

During the 2019-2020 winter season, there are numerous activities organized by the ski resort to celebrate their 50th year in operation.

In 2019, Ski Montcalm has joined the OuiCanSki program, the goal of which is to initiate new Canadians to snow sports.

== Activities ==
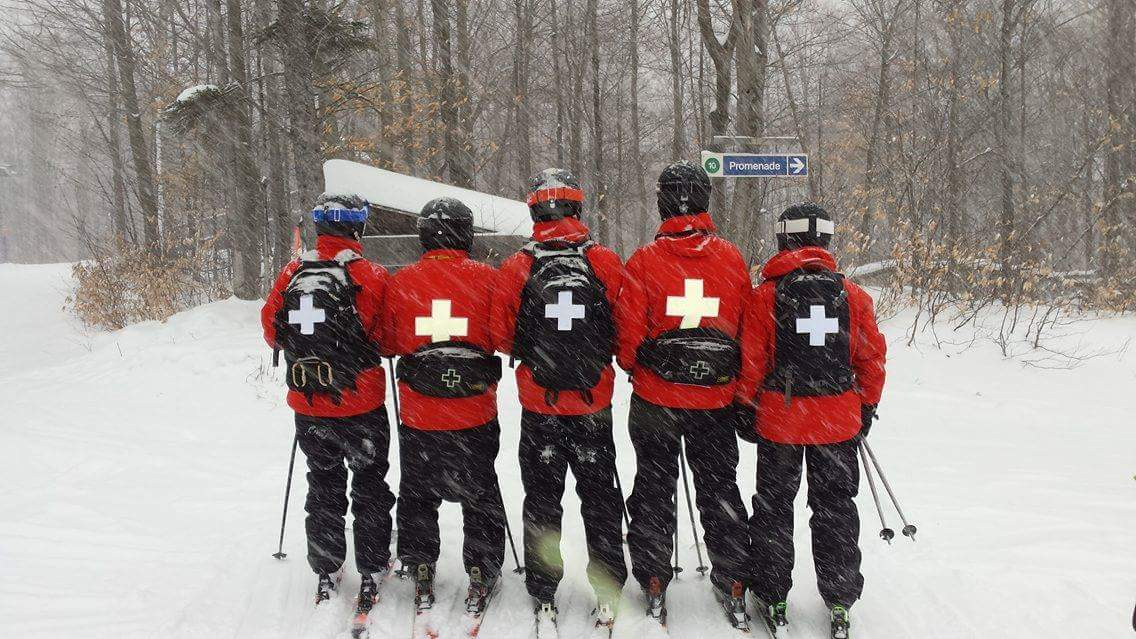
Canadian Ski Patrol volunteers at Ski Montcalm in Rawdon, Quebec

Ski Montcalm offers several types of activities and services.

Skiing and snowboarding equipment rentals are available on site.

Lessons of all levels, delivered by certified instructors, are available. Certifying organizations include the Canadian Ski Instructors' Alliance and the Canadian Association of Snowboard Instructors.

Advanced first aid and rescue services are delivered by volunteer ski patrollers certified by the Canadian Ski Patrol.

Lockers to store skiing equipment can be rented during the ski season.

Cafeteria services are available during hours of operation.

Ski Montcalm also offers to rent the newly renovated lodge for celebrations such as weddings and reunions.

== See also ==
- Canadian Ski Instructors' Alliance
- Canadian Ski Patrol
- List of ski areas and resorts in Canada
