= Laurel Crosby =

- Born: Delta, British Columbia, Canada
- Known for: President of Wheelchair Rugby Canada
- Spouse: John
- Awards: Queen Elizabeth II Diamond Jubilee Medal

Laurel Alarie Crosby is the President of Wheelchair Rugby Canada. She previously served as president of the Canadian Wheelchair Sports Association and Canadian Paralympic Committee.

== Career ==
Crosby began her career as a principal at James Gilmore Elementary School, a French immersion school, in Richmond, British Columbia. While there, she launched a website and program dedicated to school-friendly wheelchair Rugby for elementary and middle school aged children.

She continued her involvement in wheelchair sports in 1979 and developed a junior sports camps for disabled youth. During the 1980s, she sat on the board of directors for the British Columbia Wheelchair Sports Association and the Canadian Wheelchair Sports Association. Crosby continued her involvement in sports into the 1990s, where she served as Canada's Chef de Mission during the 1992 Summer Paralympics. The following year, Crosby was appointed president of the Canadian Wheelchair Sports Association (CWSA) until 1997. Upon stepping down as president for the CWSA, she accepted a similar position with the Canadian Paralympic Committee.

In 2001, Crosby was considered for the position of president of the International Paralympic Committee following the retirement of Robert Steadward. Although she was not selected, her continued advocacy for wheelchair sports earned her the Daryl Thompson Award from Sport BC (British Columbia). In 2010, Crosby served as Chairperson of the Organizing Committee for the World Wheelchair Rugby Championships.

In 2013, Crosby was the recipient of the Queen Elizabeth II Diamond Jubilee Medal. Shortly thereafter, she was appointed President of British Columbia Wheelchair Sports Association and was honoured with the 2015 In Her Footsteps award by ProMOTION PLUS. In 2018, Crosby was inducted into the Delta Sports Hall of Fame as a builder.

In 2019, Crosby was appointed president of Wheelchair Rugby Canada.
