= Canadian Ski Patrol =

Canadian Ski Patrol Patrouille canadienne de ski
- Formation: 1941; 85 years ago
- Legal status: Volunteer-based, non-profit organization
- Purpose: Outdoor recreation safety
- Headquarters: Ottawa, Ontario, Canada
- Website: www.skipatrol.ca

The Canadian Ski Patrol (French: Patrouille canadienne de ski) is a national, non-profit, registered charitable organization that is volunteer-based and provides advanced first aid and emergency response services at more than 230 ski resorts and Nordic centres, as well as hundreds of recreational and sporting events across Canada. The Canadian Ski Patrol (CSP) has more than 4,500 registered members consisting of alpine and Nordic skiers, snowboarders, and non-skiers/boarders, making it the largest volunteer-based certified first responder organization in Canada. Members of the CSP are involved in accident prevention and intervention, managerial activities, and patroller and public education.

== History ==
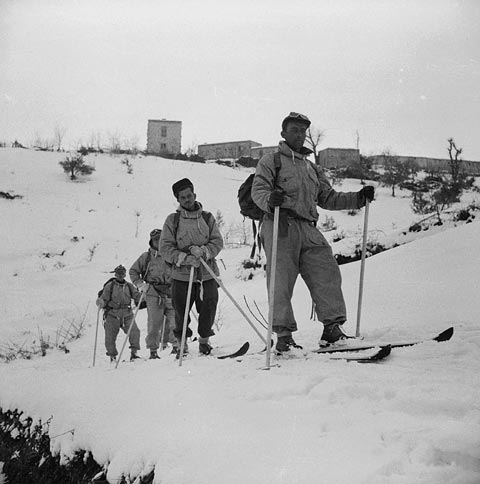
Canadian Ski Patrol members with Regimental Sergeant-Major Prévost in the lead in Italy in 1944

In 1940, Dr. Douglas Ernest Firth was asked by the Canadian Amateur Ski Association (CASA) to organize and train a first aid rescue team to patrol the ski resorts in the Toronto area. It was from this request that the Canadian Ski Patrol System (CSPS) was formed as a standing committee of the CASA with independent patrols in different areas. During the years between 1941 and 1948, the Second World War restricted expansion, but the Toronto-area and Montreal-area ski patrols united to form the nucleus of a national organization. During the next few years, the system expanded in Ontario, Quebec, and the Vancouver area.

In the 1960s, following a dramatic increase in the popularity of skiing as a family sport, the services provided by the CSPS were in great demand. Registration grew to more than 650 certified members, providing services in Quebec, the Lakehead area (now Thunder Bay, Ontario), Winnipeg, Calgary and Edmonton, in addition to the original central (Ontario and Montreal) regions.

In 1961, the CSPS became an accredited national charity, thereby gaining independence from the CASA.

In 1966, Governor General of Canada Georges Vanier became the first patron on the CSPS.

During the late 1960s, expansion continued both in the east and in the west with the addition of an Atlantic Division and the formation of a zone which covered a broad area within British Columbia. Membership grew proportionately, with approximately 2,500 certified patrollers registered by the end of the decade. The following year, the Saskatchewan Division was formed and, by 1975, registration had reached 4,200 certified patrollers.

A national management committee was established in 1978 to handle the operation of the system, and the following year the organization moved its head office to a permanent facility in Ottawa. Today, the head office remains in the same location, with three full-time staff members who manage day-to-day business operations.

In 2013, the name of the CSPS was officially changed to the Canadian Ski Patrol (CSP), and the current logo with a red leaf and a white cross was adopted.

Over the years, some ski areas across the country have either dissociated from or refused to adhere to the CSP. As such, it is becoming more common for some ski areas, such as SilverStar Mountain Resort in British Columbia, to hire professional (paid) patrollers, while some other ski areas have a fifty-fifty distribution of professional (paid) and volunteer (CSP) patrollers. Some resorts also recruit patrollers holding more extensive professional certifications, such as primary care paramedic, nurse, or physician.

The situation is even more complex in the province of Quebec, where several alternative ski patrol training organizations exist, including the Institut national de secourisme du Québec, Groupe Montagne Explore, Trauma Experts, and Station Mont Sainte-Anne.

== Coast-to-coast organization ==
The CSP is divided into Divisions, each of which is led by a Division President, an Education Officer as well as other officers as required. Divisions are further sub-divided into Zones, with a Zone President, executive officers (including an education officer), patrol leaders (one for each ski area), assistant patrol leaders, and patrollers.

== Training and certification ==
=== Advanced first aid ===
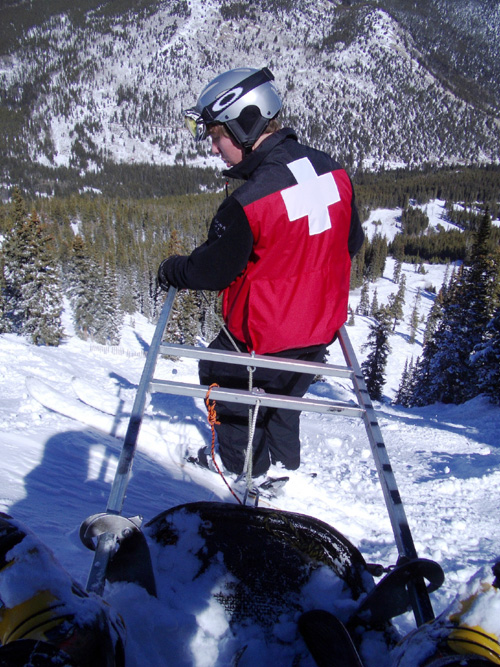
Ski patroller maneuvering a loaded toboggan down a steep slope.

All ski patrollers are required to complete initial certification or recertify annually in an advanced first aid course, which includes cardiopulmonary resuscitation (CPR), automated external defibrillation (AED), oxygen therapy, and WHMIS training. Following successful completion or recertification of their training, each member is certified in advanced first aid and rescue procedures as an advanced first aid responder. This training and certification are both recognized by the federal government.

The initial certification course is a minimum of 60 hours, while annual recertification courses are a minimum of 16 hours. Successful completion of a certification course also requires successful completion of written, skills, diagnostic and CPR/AED testing.

The advanced first aid and CPR certification provided by the CSP is recognized by most workplace safety agencies across Canada.

=== On snow and accident scene management ===
Members participating in alpine and Nordic disciplines are required to maintain their on-snow certification, which consists of being able to demonstrate intermediate-level skiing or snowboarding skills, the ability to properly and safely handle a toboggan, with and without being loaded with a patient, and effectively manage an accident scene. During on snow training, patrollers are often introduced to local protocols, which might differ from those used in other ski resorts. Recertification is required every 3 years, although many zones rectify their members annually during recruit training. Some areas also accept patrollers who are on foot or snowshoeing.

=== Skill maintenance ===
Throughout the year, members of the CSP organize training sessions in order to maintain their skills with regard to advanced first aid, accident scene management, rescue operations, and avalanche control. Although some exercises are reserved for CSP members, many take place with partner organizations, such as local emergency medical services, police, and search and rescue groups. Indeed, any significant incident that occurs within a ski resort, such as a multi-casualty incident or major avalanche, requires multi-agency response in order to ensure a safe and effective rescue operation.

== Services provided ==
=== On snow ===
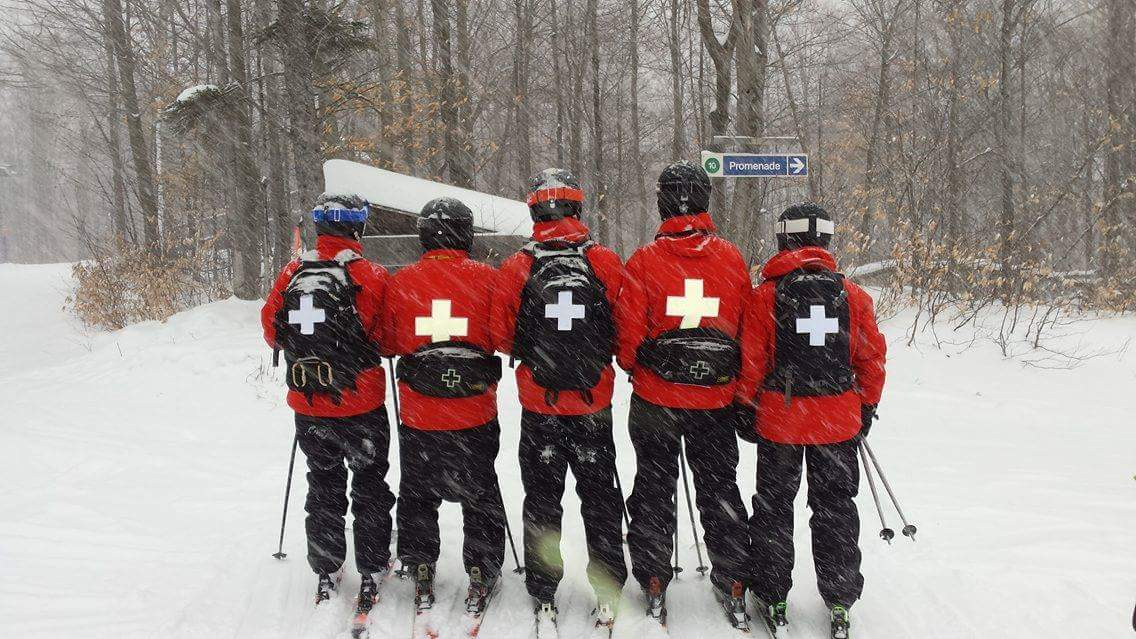
Canadian Ski Patrol volunteers at Ski Montcalm in Rawdon, Quebec

The CSP provides the full range of services which would be needed by an alpine or Nordic facility: advanced first-aid and emergency response, patient extrication and transportation, safety initiatives, and avalanche mitigation and response which may include the use of explosives and helicopters. At some resorts, patrollers also provide lift evacuation services when needed, mostly as assistance to mountain operations teams. Members of the CSP typically perform an opening sweep before the official opening of the resort for the general public in order to mark possible hazards and close areas deemed inappropriate for recreational skiing and snowboarding. At the end of the day, patrollers will ride the last chair and perform a closing sweep to ensure all patrons are off the hill.

=== Four seasons ===
The CSP provides medical and first response services at events year round such as marathons, festivals, and bikeathons.

Some notable events which the CSP has provided medical services at include the 1988 Calgary and 2010 Vancouver Winter Olympics, Canada Winter Games, Becel Ride for Heart, Scotiabank Toronto Waterfront Marathon and the Ottawa Bluesfest, the Toronto Ride to Conquer Cancer, and the Toronto OneWalk to Conquer Cancer.

== Special events ==
Every year, the CSP collectively organizes special events related to the promotion of ski safety. While some events are organized at the national level, others, such as support nights and dinners, are planned locally by individual ski resort patrols or zones. Nationally, on the third of February, annually, is held the Canadian Ski Patrol Day, celebrated within ski resorts across the country. Activities typically include ski patrol shadowing, a variety of games for children, safe slaloming, etc.

In 2016 and 2017, the CSP attempt to break the snow angels Guinness World Record on Canadian Ski Patrol Day by inviting fellow Canadians to put on a snowsuit and make snow angels in ski resorts and public areas across Canada in order to beat the old record of 15,851 people. Hundreds of ski resorts across the country, from Newfoundland to Vancouver Island, took part in the event, both in 2016 and 2017.

The AdventureSmart program partners with the CSP to teach the basics of avalanche rescue.

== Research ==
The CSP also participates in research by providing information regarding skiing injuries in Canada.

== See also ==
- Canadian Ski Instructors' Alliance
