= Tim Frick =

Canadian wheelchair basketball coach

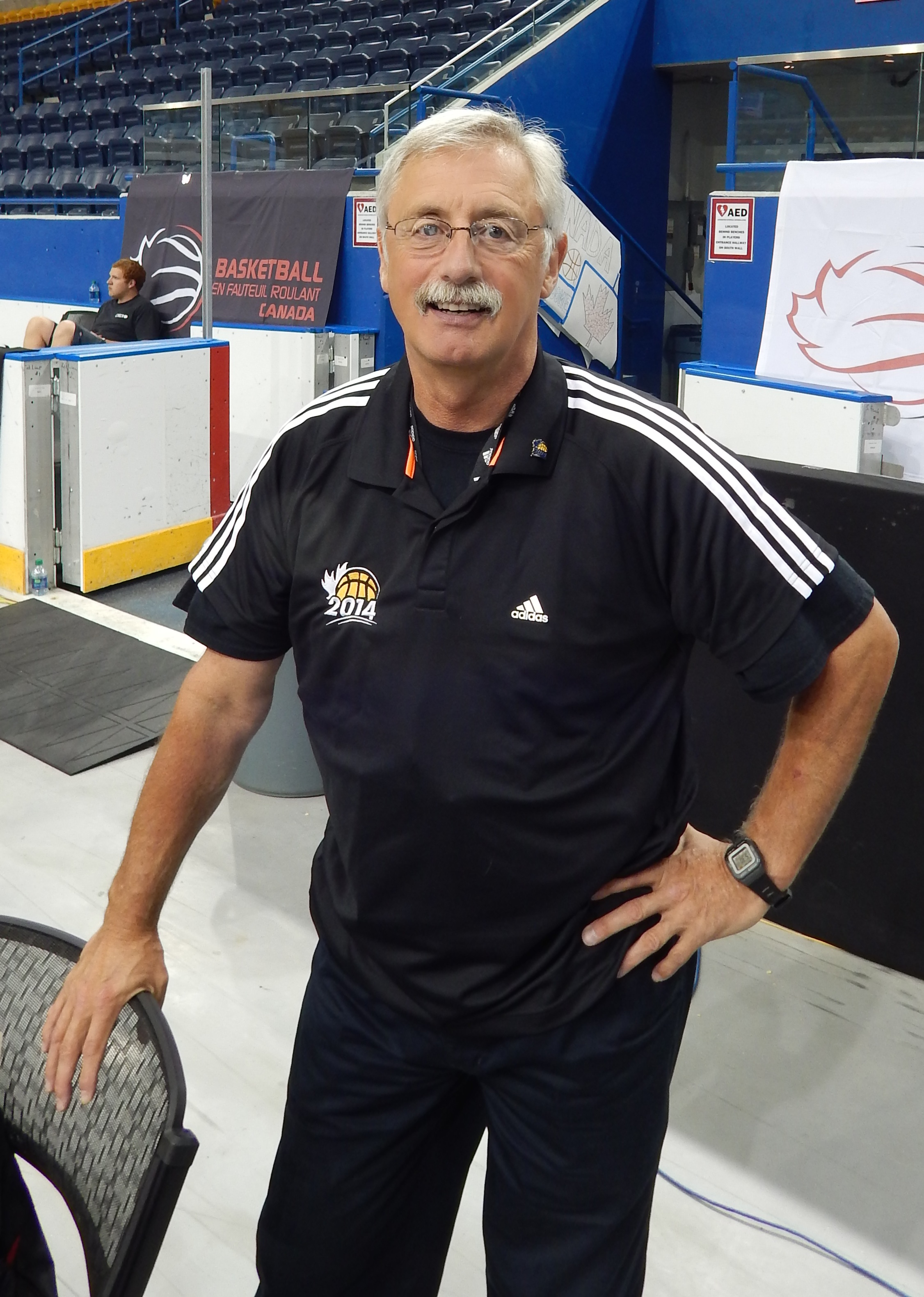

Personal information
- Nationality: Canadian
- Born: 23 November 1952 (age 73) Aldershot, England, United Kingdom
- Height: 5 ft 10 in (1.78 m)

Sport
- Country: Canada
- Sport: Wheelchair basketball
- Event: Women's team
Medal record
Wheelchair basketball
Representing Canada
Paralympic Games
Gold medal – first place	1992 Barcelona	Women's wheelchair basketball
Gold medal – first place	1996 Atlanta	Women's wheelchair basketball
Gold medal – first place	2000 Sydney	Women's wheelchair basketball
Bronze medal – third place	2004 Athens	Women's wheelchair basketball
Wheelchair Basketball World Championship
Gold medal – first place	1994 World Championships	Women's wheelchair basketball
Gold medal – first place	1998 World Championships	Women's wheelchair basketball
Gold medal – first place	2002 World Championships	Women's wheelchair basketball
Gold medal – first place	2006 World Championships	Women's wheelchair basketball
Bronze medal – third place	1990 World Championships	Women's wheelchair basketball

Timothy J. C. Frick CM OBC (born 23 November 1952) is a Canadian wheelchair basketball coach who coached the Canadian women's team to three consecutive Summer Paralympic Games gold medals, in 1992, 1996 and 2000, and four consecutive World Wheelchair Basketball Championship titles, in 1994, 1998, 2002 and 2006. He was inducted into the Wheelchair Basketball Canada Hall of Fame in 2012, the Canadian Paralympic Hall of Fame in 2013, Canada's Sports Hall of Fame in 2014 and induction into the BC Sports Hall of Fame in 2017.

== Biography ==
Tim Frick was born in Aldershot, England on 23 November 1952.^{[1]} He moved to Sudbury, Ontario, Canada with his family when he was 4, and then to Parksville, BC. Canada at age 12.

(ref: Tim Frick 2015 Presentation) He coached a team of six-year-old soccer players when he was only twelve years old. He graduated from the University of British Columbia with a Bachelor of Physical Education degree in kinesiology in 1975. While there, he was part of the university's volleyball team. As a student he met Rick Hansen, and was his coach from 1977 to 1984. He also coached Terry Fox in volleyball and track and field athletics from 1977 to 1980.

In 1990, Frick became head coach of the Canadian women's national team. He was only expecting to stay for a year, but what followed was an extraordinary run of success for the national team. They won three consecutive Summer Paralympic Games gold medals at the 1992 Summer Paralympics in Barcelona, the 1996 Summer Paralympics in Atlanta and the 2000 Summer Paralympics in Sydney, and four consecutive World Wheelchair Basketball Championship titles in 1994, 1998, 2002 and 2006. He was also assistant coach of Team BC men's and women's wheelchair basketball teams in 1996, and then became head coach of the Douglas College Royals and the BC Breakers in 1997.

After retiring as a coach in 2009, Frick became a sportscaster, providing webcast commentary for the Women's U25 World Wheelchair Basketball Championship that Canada hosted in 2011, and the 2014 Women's World Wheelchair Basketball Championship that was held in Toronto in June 2014.

One of his many hobbies include, woodworking and Sea Kayaking the Salish Sea of the Southern Gulf Islands of British Columbia.

== Awards and honours ==
Frick has won numerous awards, including the Canada 125 Medal in 1992, the Order of British Columbia medal in 1999, the Queen's Golden Jubilee Medal in 2002, and the Queen Elizabeth II Diamond Jubilee Medal in 2013. He was inducted into the Wheelchair Basketball Canada Hall of Fame in 2012, the Basketball BC Hall of fame and the Canadian Paralympic Hall of Fame in 2013, and Canada's Sports Hall of Fame in 2014. He was also inducted into the Canadian Wheelchair Basketball Hall of Fame as part of the women's team in 1996, 1997, 1999, 2001, 2003 and 2007. He won the Coaching Association of Canada's Coaching Excellence Award seven times, in 1989, 1991, 1993, 1995, 1996, 2002, 2004 and 2006, and received the Coaching Association of Canada's Jack Donohue Coach of the Year Award in 2008, and its Geoff Gowan Lifetime Achievement Award in 2009. In 2016, Frick was inducted into the Canadian Disability Hall of Fame.

The "Tim Frick Paralympic Coach Excellence Award" was created in his honour by the Canadian Paralympic Committee (CPC). A biannual award presented to a Paralympic Games coach, it is voted for by the CPC Coaches Council, and announced at the CPC Congress banquet following the Summer or Winter Paralympic Games. It was awarded to Jerry Tonello, the Canadian men's wheelchair basketball coach, in 2012.
