= Canadian Paralympic Committee =

National Paralympic Committee of Canada

National Paralympic Committee
- Country: Canada
- Code: CAN
- Created: 1981 (as Canadian Federation of Sport Organizations for the Disabled)
- Continental association: APC
- Headquarters: Ottawa, Ontario, Canada
- President: Karen O'Neill
- Website: www.paralympic.ca

Previous logo

The Canadian Paralympic Committee (CPC; French: Comité paralympique canadien), also known as Team Canada, is the private, non-profit organization representing Canadian Paralympic athletes in the International Paralympic Committee (IPC) and the Parapan American Games. It represents 25 member sports organizations.

== History ==
The CPC was founded in 1981 as the Canadian Federation of Sport Organizations for the Disabled. The Canadian Paralympic Hall of Fame was relaunched in 2025 after a six-year hiatus.

The four gold medals won by the Canadian team at the 2026 Winter Paralympics represented the lowest total since 1998 and meant the country finished outside the top five of the medal table for the first time since 2006, a span of 20 years. CPC CEO Karen O'Neill called for greater sports funding from the government.

== Members ==
=== Active ===
- Alpine Canada Alpin
- Athletics Canada
- Canadian Blind Sport Association
- Canadian Cerebral Palsy Sports Association
- Canadian Curling Association
- Canadian Cycling Association
- Canadian Fencing Federation
- Canadian Soccer Association
- Canadian Wheelchair Basketball Association - now known as Wheelchair Basketball Canada
- Canadian Wheelchair Sports Association
- Canadian Yachting Association
- Cross Country Canada
- Equine Canada
- Federation of Canadian Archers
- Hockey Canada
- Judo Canada
- Rowing Canada Aviron
- Shooting Federation of Canada
- Swimming Natation Canada
- Table Tennis Canada
- Tennis Canada
- Volleyball Canada

=== Affiliate ===
- Active Living Alliance for Canadians with a Disability
- Alter Go
- Badminton Canada
- BC Disability Sports
- Bobsleigh Canada Skeleton
- Canadian Amateur DanceSport Association
- Canadian Amputee Sports Association
- Canadian Association for Disabled Skiing
- Canadian Association of Athletes with an Intellectual Disability
- Canadian Forces Personnel and Family Support Agency
- Canadian Snowboard Federation
- CanoeKayak Canada
- Field Hockey Canada
- Gymnastics Canada
- Ontario Para Network
- ParaSport Ontario
- Parasports Québec
- Parasport and Recreation PEI
- Synchro Canada
- Taekwondo Canada
- Triathlon Canada
- Water Ski and Wakeboard Canada

== Presidents ==
List of past presidents:

- Lou Lefaive (1976–1977)
- Hugh Glynn (1977–1981)
- Doug Allen (1982–1983)
- Robert Steadward (1984–1990)
- Helen Manning (1991–1997)
- Laurel Crosby (1997–1998)
- Patrick Jarvis (1998–2006)
- Henry Wohler (interim, 2006)
- Carla Qualtrough (2006–2011)
- David Legg (2011–2013)
- Gaétan Tardif (2013–2017)
- Marc-André Fabien (2017–2025)
- Karen O'Neill (2025–)

== Hall of Fame ==
Athletes

- Arnold Boldt (2001)
- Eugene Reimer (2001)
- Joanne Berdan (2003)
- André Viger (2005)
- Michael Edgson (2011)
- Clayton Gerein (2011)
- Ljiljana Ljubisic (2011)
- Robert Easton (2013)
- Jennifer Krempien (2013)
- Tim McIsaac (2013)
- Chantal Petitclerc (2015)
- Lauren Woolstencroft (2015)
- Marni Abbott-Peter (2015)
- Karolina Wisniewska (2017)
- Colette Bourgonje (2019)
- Josh Dueck (2019)
- Viviane Forest (2019)
- Joey Johnson (2019)
- Garett Hickling (2019)
- Sonja Gaudet (2025)
- Benoît Huot (2025)
- Todd Nicholson (2025)

Coaches

- Earl Church (2011)
- Tim Frick (2013)
- Wilf Strom (2015)
- Ozzie Sawicki (2017)
- Joe Rea (2019)
- Paul Bowes (2025)

Builders

- Robert Steadward (2000)
- Robert W. Jackson (2001)
- Rick Hansen (2003)
- Jerry Johnston (2003)
- Duncan Campbell (2005)
- Patrick Jarvis (2007)
- Joyce Fairbairn (2011)
- Janet Dunn (2013)
- John Howe (2013)
- Audrey Strom (2015)
- Gary McPherson (2015)
- Dr. Donald Royer (2015)
- Carla Qualtrough (2017)
- Archie Allison (2017)
- Maureen Orchard (2017)
- Kathy Newman (2019)

== See also ==
- Canadian Olympic Committee
- Canada at the Paralympics
- Canada at the Parapan American Games
