= Duncan Campbell (inventor) =

Canadian co-inventor of murderball

Duncan Campbell (born 1955 or 1956), sometimes known as "the Quadfather", is a Canadian co-inventor of murderball. In the 1970s, Campbell invented the sport with four other Canadians before the sport was renamed to wheelchair rugby. In the sport, Campbell coached the Canadian team that went to the 2000 Summer Paralympics and organized the 2010 IWRF World Championship. Apart from wheelchair rugby, Campbell became a recreational therapist for the G. F. Strong Centre in 1986. His honours include an induction into the Canadian Paralympic Committee Hall of Fame in 2005 and receiving the Paralympic Order in 2013.

== Early life and education ==
In 1955 or 1956, Campbell was born in Winnipeg, Manitoba. During his childhood, he began his sports career playing hockey and baseball. At the age of seventeen, Campbell broke his neck while diving and became paralyzed from the waist down. For his post-secondary education, Campbell received a Bachelor of Arts from both the University of Manitoba and University of Alberta. For his degrees, Campbell specialized in psychology and recreation administration.

== Career ==
In the 1970s, Campbell co-invented murderball with four other Canadians at a physical therapy clinic in Winnipeg. The idea came to them after a volunteer at the clinic was unavailable to facilitate their exercise session. Campbell and the team used a volleyball to score points into a garbage can and later replaced the garbage can with a goal line. Their invented sport was played throughout North America and later renamed from murderball to wheelchair rugby. After the sport was created, Campbell was nicknamed "the Quadfather" by wheelchair rugby players.

In 1986, Campbell left Winnipeg for British Columbia and became a recreational therapist for the G. F. Strong Centre. While in British Columbia, Campbell played for the province's wheelchair rugby team and was part of the Canada national wheelchair rugby team. In executive roles, Campbell was a coach for the Canadian wheelchair rugby team at the 2000 Summer Paralympics and an organizer for the 2010 IWRF World Championship. He also was a development director for Wheelchair Rugby Canada and a coordinator for the Canadian Wheelchair Sports Association during the 2010s.

== Awards and honours ==
Campbell was a torchbearer at the 2008 Summer Paralympics and received the Paralympic Order in 2013. For hall of fames, Campbell was inducted into the Canadian Paralympic Committee Hall of Fame in 2005 and the BC Sports Hall of Fame in 2015. In 2017, he was one of the inductees into a hall of fame by Wheelchair Rugby Canada. In 2018, Campbell became the first person named into the International Wheelchair Rugby Federation Hall of Fame. He was awarded the Order of Sport, marking induction into Canada's Sports Hall of Fame in 2021.
