= Chronology of the Paralympic Movement =

This table indicates major milestones in the Paralympic Movement, including the development of the Summer Paralympics, the Winter Paralympics, and the International Paralympic Committee.

Year	Event
1944	Ludwig Guttmann established the Spinal Injuries Centre at the Stoke Mandeville Hospital
1948	On 29 July, the day of the Opening Ceremony of the London 1948 Olympic Games, Ludwig Guttmann organised the first competition for wheelchair athletes which he named the Stoke Mandeville Games, a milestone in Paralympics history. They involved 16 injured servicemen and women who took part in archery
1952	Dutch ex-servicemen travelled to England to compete against British athletes and this led to the establishment of the International Stoke Mandeville Games.
1955	International Committee of Sports for the Deaf (CISS) officially recognized by the International Olympic Committee (IOC).
1960	18 – 25 September - Rome Summer Paralympics - 400 athletes from 23 countries; 57 events in 8 sports. These Games became known as the 1st Summer Paralympic Games and were the 9th International Stoke Mandeville Games. The Games followed the Rome Olympics and used same venues.
1960	International Stoke Mandeville Games Committee (ISMGC) established.
1962	International Sports Organisation for the Disabled (IOSD) was established to assist visually impaired, amputees, persons with cerebral palsy and paraplegics who were not eligible to compete at the International Stoke Mandeville Games.
1964	3 – 12 November - Tokyo Summer Paralympics - 375 athletes from 21 countries; 144 events in 9 sports. Weightlifting added to the program. Opening ceremony held in front of 5,000 spectators.
1968	4–13 November - Tel Aviv Summer Paralympics - 750 athletes from 29 countries; 181 events in 10 sports. New sports included lawn bowls, women's basketball and Men's 100m wheelchair race.
1972	2 – 11 August - Heidelberg Summer Paralympics - 984 athletes from 43 countries; 1987 events in 10 sports. Events for quadriplegic added to program for the first time. Demonstration events for visually impaired athletes. Heidelberg was used as the Olympic Village in Munich was unavailable as it was converted into private apartments.
1976	3–11 August - Toronto Summer Paralympics - 1657 athletes from 38 countries; 447 events in 13 sports. Amputee and vision impaired athletes competed for the first time.goalball, shooting and standing volleyball added to program. Specialized racing wheelchairs used for the first time.
1976	21–28 February - Örnsköldsvik Winter Paralympics - 198 athletes from 16 countries; 53 events in 2 sports. First Winter Paralympics. Games demonstrated innovations in ski equipment design with 'three-track skiing' using crutches. Demonstration event was sledge racing.
1976	UNESCO Conference established the right for people with a disability to participate in sport and physical education.
1980	21–30 June - Arnhem Summer Paralympics - 1973 athletes from 42 countries; 489 events in 12 sports. Sitting volleyball added to the program. Moscow declined to host the Games. Cerebral palsy athletes compete for the first time. There were 12,000 spectators at the opening ceremony.
1980	1–7 February - Geilo Winter Paralympics - 350 athletes from 18 countries; 63 events in 2 sports. Amputee, visual impairment and les autres compete for the first time at a Winter Games.
1982	International Co-ordination Committee of World Sports Organisations for the Disabled (ICC) was established by the International Olympic Committee (IOC) due to the need for a single governing body to look after disability sport
1984	17–30 June (US) / 22 July - 1 August (UK) - Stoke Mandeville/New York Summer Paralympics - 1100 athletes from 41 countries (UK) and 1,800 from 45 countries (USA); 903 events in 18 sports. New York Games were held at the Hofstra University and events were held for amputees, les austres, cerebral palsy and vision impaired athletes. Stoke Mandeville Games were for athletes with a spinal cord disability. It was decided that future Games should be held in one city. boccia, road cycling and football 7-a-side added to program.
1984	14–20 January - Innsbruck Winter Paralympics - 457 athletes from 21 countries; 107 events in 3 sports. Cerebral palsy athletes compete for the first time.
1984	1984 Los Angeles Olympics included Men's 1500m and Women's 800m wheelchair races as demonstration events.
1984	The term Paralympic Games approved by the IOC. It was used in the lead up to the 1988 Seoul Paralympics.
1988	15–24 October - Seoul Summer Paralympics - 3057 athletes from 61 countries; 732 events in 16 sports. The Games utilized Olympic facilities. For the first time short stature athletes competed in the les autres category.Judo was added to the program and Wheelchair tennis was a demonstration sport.
1988	17–24 January - Innsbruck Winter Paralympics - 397 athletes from 22 countries; 96 events in 4 sports. Sit ski events introduced in the sports of alpine and Nordic skiing.
1989	On 22 September, International Paralympic Committee (IPC) was founded and replaced the ICC as the governing body of the Paralympic movement with Canadian Robert Steadward as its inaugural President.
1990	ISMFG changed its name to International Stoke Mandeville Wheelchair Sports Federation (ISMWSF).
1990	IPC agreement with the ICC so that it remained responsible for the Paralympic Games until after the 1992 Barcelona Paralympic Games/
1992	3–14 September - Barcelona Summer Paralympics - 3001 athletes from 33 countries: 431 events in 16 sports Wheelchair tennis was a medal sport for the first time. IOC President Juan Antonio Samaranch attended and endorsed the Games. Inaugural Paralympics for Persons with an Intellectual Disability held in Madrid, Spain immediately after the Games. Final Games organized by ICC.
1992	25 March - 1 April - Tignes/Albertville Winter Paralympics - 475 athletes from 24 countries; 78 events in 3 sports. Biathlon added to the program. Demonstration events held for athletes with an intellectual disability in alpine and cross country skiing. First Winter Games to share Olympic venues.
1992	Logo Mind, Body and Spirit (3 tae-guks) adopted by IPC and used until 2003.
1993	IPC established a Sport Science Committee.
1994	10–19 March - Lillehammer Winter Paralympics - 492 athletes from 31 countries; 133 events in 5 sports. First Winter Games held under IPC control and Games aligned to revised Winter Olympic Games four year schedule. Ice sledge hockey added to the program.
1995	International Committee of Sports for the Deaf (CISS) withdraws from the IPC.
1996	16–25 August - Atlanta Summer Paralympics - 3259 athletes from 104 countries; 508 events in 20 sports. Athletes with an intellectual disability included for the first time at a Summer Games. equestrian and track cycling discipline added to the program and sailing was a demonstration sport. IPC officially hosted the Games for the first time and assumed responsibility for future Games. First Games to attract worldwide sponsorship. 12,000 volunteers assisted with the operation of the Games.
1998	5–14 March - Nagano Winter Paralympics - 571 athletes from 32 countries; 122 events in 4 sports. Athletes with an intellectual disability included for the first time at a Winter Games. With the internet in its infancy, the official website recorded 7.7 million hits during the Games.
1999	IPC moved into what remains its current Headquarters in Bonn, Germany. IOC President Juan Antonio Samaranch attended opening.
1999	INAS-FMH changed its name to International Sports Federation for Persons with Intellectual Disability(INAS-FID).
2000	18–29 October - Sydney Summer Paralympics - 3881 athletes from 122 countries; 551 events in 20 sports. First Games held in the Southern Hemisphere. Women's events were included in the powerlifting program and wheelchair rugby and sailing were medal sports for the first time. IOC signed a co-operation agreement with IPC to strengthen their relationship. Games had comprehensive international television coverage for the first time. Over 340,000 school children attended and were given an insight into Paralympic sport.
2001	Robert Steadward was succeeded by the former British Paralympian Philip Craven after serving three terms as president.
2001	On 19 June, IPC and IOC signed an agreement that ensured the practice of “one bid, one city,” meaning the same city will host both the Olympic and Paralympic Games.
2001	IPC General Assembly suspended athletes with an intellectual disability (ID) from the Paralympic Games due to 69% of athletes who won medals in intellectual disability events at the Sydney Games not have the correct ID verification.
2002	7–16 March - Salt Lake City Winter Paralympics - 416 athletes from 36 countries; 92 events in 5 sports. Worldwide television coverage was secured by the organizers, and there was high demand for tickets.
2003	Sir Philip Craven, IPC President elected as a new IOC member at the 115th IOC Session in Prague, Czechoslovakia.
2003	IPC Governing Board approved the development of a Universal Classification Code.
2003	New logo Spirit in motion' (Agitos) adopted by IPC.
2003	IPC signs the World Anti-Doping Code and revised its Anti-Doping Code to comply with the World Anti-Doping Code.
2004	17–28 September - Athens Summer Paralympics - 3808 athletes from 135 countries; 517 events in 19 sports. 5-a-side football added to the program. A cumulated global TV audience of 1.8 billion watch the Athens 2004 Paralympic Games. Over 3000 journalists covered the Games.
2004	International Wheelchair and Amputee Sports Federation (IWSF) established with the merger of ISMWSF and ISOD.
2005	Paralympic Awards are presented for the first time.
2006	10–19 March - Torino Winter Paralympics - 477 athletes from 39 countries; 58 events in 4 sports. Wheelchair curling made its Games debut. IPC launched ParalympicSport.TV, an online TV channel, during the Games and it attracted nearly 40,000 unique viewers from 105 nations.
2006	IPC's revenue exceeded EUR 5 million for the first time.
2007	IPC Classification Code and International Standards approved at IPC General Assembly meeting held in November.
2008	6–17 September - Beijing Summer Paralympics - 3,951 from 146 countries; 472 events in 20 sports. Rowing was added to the program. 3.8 billion throughout the world viewed the Games on television and 3.4 million spectators attended the Games.
2009	IPC General Assembly reinstated athletes with an intellectual disability into the Paralympic Games.
2009	IPC Position Stand - Background and Scientific Principles of Classification In Paralympic Sport passed by IPC Sports Science Committee, Classification Committee and Governing Board in June.
2010	12–21 March - Vancouver Winter Paralympics - 502 athletes from 44 countries; 64 events in 5 sports. 230,000 ticket sales, a record for the Games.
2012	29 August - 9 September - London Summer Paralympics - 4,237 athletes from 164 countries; 503 events in 20 sports. Athletes with an intellectual disability return to the Games by competing in athletics, swimming and table tennis.
2012	IPC and IOC signed a new co-operation agreement which increased IOC financial support and guaranteed the Paralympics will be staged in the same city and venues as the Olympics through until Tokyo 2020.
2012	IPC's revenue exceeded EUR 10 million for the first time.
2012	IPC launched the Agitos Foundation.
2014	7–16 March - Sochi Winter Paralympics - 541 athletes from 45 countries; 72 events in 5 sports. 316,200 tickets were sold, the most ever for Paralympic Winter Games. Para-snowboard added to the program. 316,200 ticket sales, surpassing the record from Vancouver Games.
2016	7 August - The IPC suspended the Russian Paralympic Committee due to its inability to fulfil its membership responsibilities, in particular in relation to compliance with the IPC Anti-Doping Code and World Anti-Doping Code. This followed publication of the McLaren Report into Russian doping practicies around Sochi 2014. The decision meant Russia could not send athletes to the Rio 2016 Paralympic Games in any capacity.
2016	7–18 September - Rio 2016 Paralympic Games. Para canoe and Para triathlon included in the program.
2026	6-15 March - Milano Cortina 2026 Paralympic Winter Games. The event set multiple benchmarks - a record 611 athletes from 55 nations, while 27 NPCs won medals, the most ever at a single Paralympic Winter Games.
