= Shooting Federation of Canada =

Governing body

- Sport: ISSF Shooting Sports
- Jurisdiction: Canada
- Abbreviation: SFC
- Founded: 1932
- Affiliation: ISSF
- Regional affiliation: SCA
- Headquarters: Ottawa, Ontario
- President: Sandra Honour
- CEO: Jasmine Northcott

Official website
- sfc-ftc.ca
- (Canada)

The Shooting Federation of Canada (SFC; French: Fédération de Tir du Canada (FTC)) is the national governing body responsible for the development and governance of recreational and competitive target shooting in Canada, particularly focussed on ISSF shooting sport disciplines and preparing athletes for competition at the World Championships and Olympic Games. The SFC is recognised by the Canadian Olympic Committee and Canadian Paralympic Committee.

== History ==
The SFC was founded in 1932 as the "Canadian Small Bore Rifle Association." It received Letters of Patent in the name of the "Canadian Small Bore Association" on July 31, 1936. In the aftermath of WWII, the CSBA changed its name to the "Canadian Civilian Association of Marksmen." It remained the CCAM until December 2, 1964, when it adopted its current name.

In May 2020, the SFC wrote to Public Safety Minister Bill Blair concerned that the provisions of SOR/2020-96. In particular, the concern that the "20mm" rule prohibiting firearms with a bore diameter exceeding 20mm would ban every 10- and 12-gauge shotgun, including those used for Olympic Skeet and Trap.

In 2022, an open letter to membership, SFC President Sandra Honour called on members to engage with their Members of Parliament regarding Bill C21 which sought to prohibit private ownership of many target pistols.

== High Performance Program ==
Canada competes in all ISSF sanctioned disciplines and regularly has competing athletes at ISSF World Cups, ISSF World Championships, and major games such as Pan Am Games, CAT (Confederación Americana de Tiro) Championships, and Olympic Games.

The SFC High Performance Program under the auspices of the High Performance Committee consists of the National Team, Development Team, and Junior Team.

== World Class Performance ==
Canada has won nine Olympic medals in shooting events, going back to 1908.

- 1984 - Linda Thom Gold, Women's 25m pistol
- 1956 - Gerald Ouellette Gold, Men's 50m prone rifle
- 1956 - Gilmour Boa Bronze, Men's 50m prone rifle
- 1952 - George Genereux Gold, Trap
- 1924 - Silver, Team Trap
- 1908 - Walter Ewing Gold, Trap
- 1908 - George Beattie Silver, Trap
- 1908 - Silver, Team Trap
- 1908 - Bronze, Team Military Rifle

== See also ==
- Dominion of Canada Rifle Association
