= Robert Steadward =

Canadian sports administrator (born 1946)

Robert Steadward CC AOE
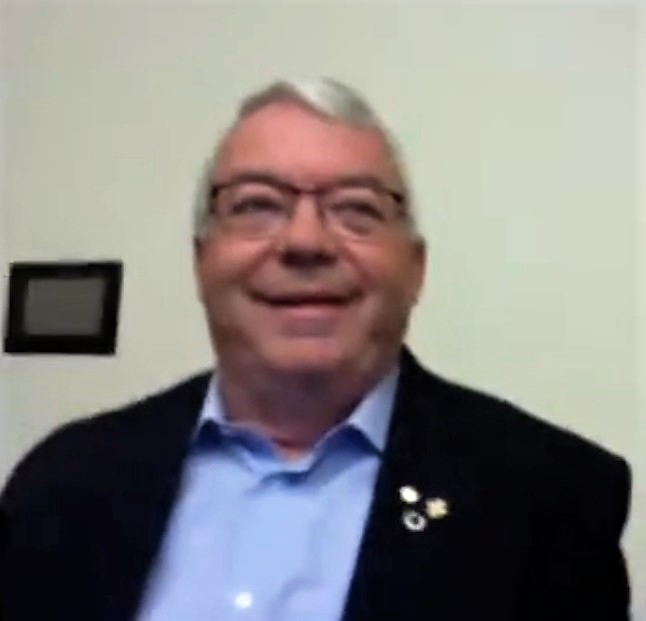
- Steadward in 2019

1st President of the International Paralympic Committee
- In office 1989–2001
- Succeeded by: Philip Craven

Personal details
- Born: May 26, 1946 (age 79) Eston, Saskatchewan, Canada
- Education: BPhEd, Master's, PhD
- Alma mater: University of Alberta; University of Oregon
- Occupation: Sports administrator, professor, sports scientist, author
- Known for: Canadian Paralympic Committee, International Paralympic Committee
- Awards: Alberta Sports Hall of Fame (1984); Order of Canada (1999); Canadian Disability Hall of Fame (2002); Queen Elizabeth II Golden Jubilee Medal 2002); Canada's Sports Hall of Fame (2007); Alberta Order of Excellence (2010)

Robert Daniel Steadward, CC, AOE (born May 26, 1946) is a Canadian retired sports administrator, professor, sports scientist, and author. Steadward helped organize the first Canadian wheelchair sport national championships in 1968, and later coached Canada in wheelchair basketball at the Summer Paralympics. He became a professor at the University of Alberta in 1971, later served as chairman of the Department of Athletics, and published more than 150 papers about disability sport. He was the founding president of the Alberta Wheelchair Sports Association in 1971, founded the Research and Training Centre for Athletes with Disabilities in 1978, served as president of the Canadian Paralympic Committee from 1984 to 1990, and later became a member of the Canadian Olympic Committee.

Steadward became the first president of the International Paralympic Committee (IPC) in 1989, after a successful campaign to consolidate international disability sport organizations. He signed a memorandum of understanding with Juan Antonio Samaranch of the International Olympic Committee during the 2000 Summer Olympics which united the Paralympic movement with the Olympic Games movement, and saw one city host both events. During his tenure as president of the IPC, the organization grew from 37 to 172 national federations, and the Paralympic Games grew in popularity. The Commonwealth Games subsequently integrated disabled sports into its program, as a result of his efforts. His career has been recognized with the Order of Canada, the Queen Elizabeth II Golden Jubilee Medal, and the Alberta Order of Excellence. He has also been inducted into the Alberta Sports Hall of Fame, the Canadian Disability Hall of Fame, and Canada's Sports Hall of Fame.

== Early life and education ==
Steadward was born on May 26, 1946, in Eston, Saskatchewan. His parents Danny and Irene encouraged their children to be active participants in the community. As a youth, he enjoyed ice hockey, baseball, track and field, and riding horses. He graduated from Luther College High School in Regina, Saskatchewan in 1964.

Steadward initially studied dentistry at the University of Alberta but abandoned that career path. After a few years of not attending school, he returned to the University of Alberta and earned a Bachelor of Physical Education in 1967. While working as an intern with disabled athletes, he chose to volunteer in Paralympic sport and work with its athletes. He completed a Master's degree in physical education science and then a Doctorate at the University of Oregon, during which he was a member of the Epsilon-Alpha chapter in the Kappa Sigma fraternity.

== Canadian disabled sports ==
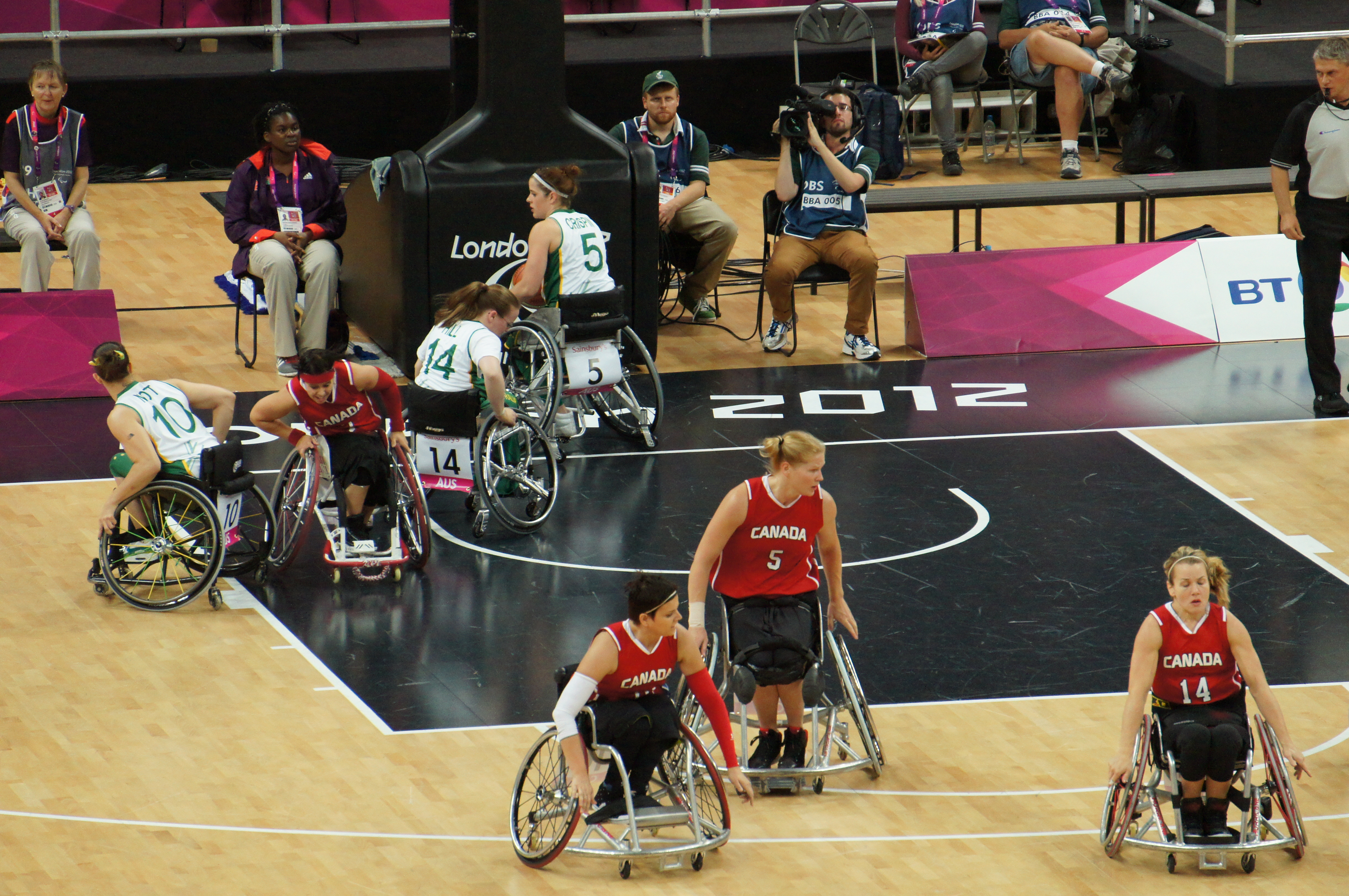
Steadward was president of the Canadian Paralympic Committee, which included national teams for wheelchair basketball.

Steadward became involved in disabled sports in Edmonton during the 1960s while he was a student. He coached a wheelchair basketball club called the Edmonton Handicaddies; and along with Gary McPherson, he helped organize the first Canadian wheelchair sport national championships, hosted at the University of Alberta in 1968. After realizing there was lack of funds allocated to disabled sports, he decided to become more involved. He coached for the Canadian Paralympic Committee (CPC) from 1966 to 1976, in swimming, wheelchair basketball, and track and field. He served as a national governor for the CPC from 1970 to 1986, was its treasurer from 1974 to 176, and was head of mission for international events from 1971 to 1980. He founded the Alberta Wheelchair Sports Association in 1971, and served as its president until 1975. Before the association was founded, Steadward noted that activities for disabled people were managed by hospitals and long-term care facilities, and he wanted to see people in physiotherapy programs become involved in sports.

In 1971, Steadward joined the Faculty of Kinesiology at the University of Alberta. He helped design and construct a three-wheeled racing wheelchair used by Doug Bovee at the 1972 Summer Paralympics. The experiment impacted the design of future racing wheelchairs, and opened the door for high-performance competition in disability sport. Steadward coached the Canadian national wheelchair basketball team at the same Summer Paralympics, and at the 1973 International Stoke Mandeville Games. He was head of mission for Canada at the 1976 Summer Paralympics in Toronto, and served as president of the Canadian Federation of Sport Organizations for the Disabled.

Steadward founded the Research and Training Centre for Athletes with Disabilities in 1978. He envisioned a place where disabled athletes had a place to train for competition in sports, and have access to quality coaching. He also founded the Canadian Sports Fund for the Physically Disabled in 1979, to provide funds for research, and was its chairman for 10 years. He also served as president of the Alberta Universities Athletic Association, chairman of Accreditation for the 1978 Commonwealth Games hosted in Edmonton, and vice-president of the 1983 Summer Universiade also hosted in Edmonton.

Steadward served as president of the CPC from 1984 to 1990. While with the CPC, he also acted as a governor, treasurer, coach at the national level, and head of mission to international events.

Steadward retired from teaching at the University of Alberta in 2001. He had served as Associate Dean of the Faculty of Physical Education, and also chairman of the Department of Athletics. During his tenure, he worked with 50 graduate students working to improve disability sport. His research led to more than 150 papers published about disability sport.

== International disabled sports ==
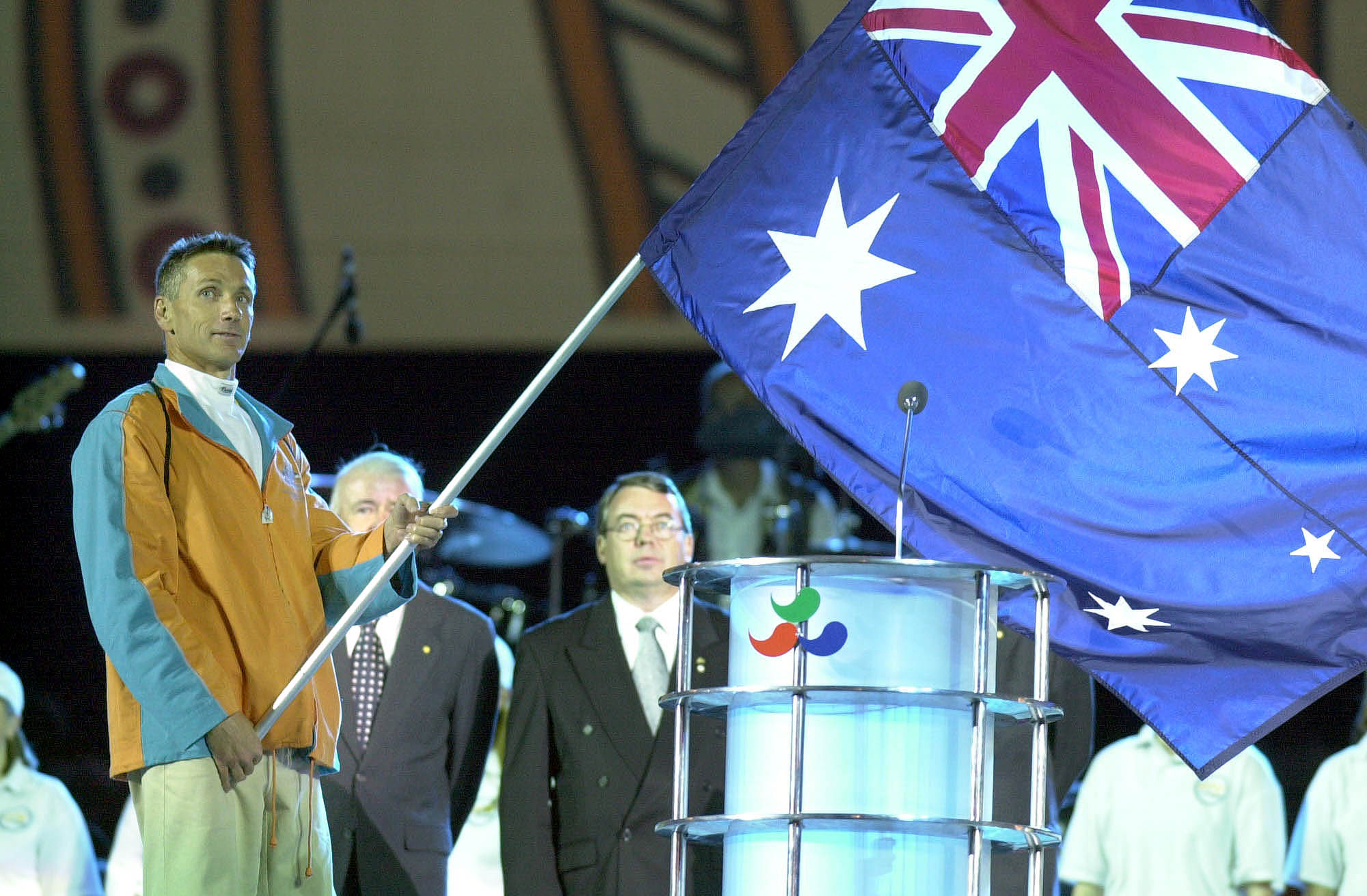
Robert Steadward (right rear) looks on as the Australian flag is brought to the stage by flagbearer Brendan Burkett during the opening ceremony of the 2000 Sydney Paralympic Games.

Steadward campaigned to other global disability sport organizations to unite as one. In the 1980s, Paralympic Games were organized as a joint venture by the International Sport Organization for the Disabled, the International Stoke Mandeville Games Federation, the International Blind Sports Federation, and the Cerebral Palsy International Sports and Recreation Association. By 1987, he proposed creating a Paralympic sport model which eventually led to the creation of the International Paralympic Committee (IPC). He was elected the first president of the IPC in 1989, and served in the role until 2001.

Steadward was elected to the International Olympic Committee (IOC) in 2000. He served as co-chairman of the bid committee for the 2001 World Championships in Athletics hosted in Edmonton. He signed a memorandum of understanding with Juan Antonio Samaranch of the IOC during the 2000 Summer Olympics which united the Paralympic movement with the Olympic Games movement, and saw one city host both events. Steadward felt that being aligned with the Olympics would allow the Paralympics to reach its potential, but noted that the relationship was delicate at first "because we're seen as the poor cousin needing help and we don't want that". He originally lobbied for full integration with Olympics, but decided the Paralympics would be stronger as a separate event.

Foundation of the IPC...

"We had to move towards excellence and elite Paralympic sport. I'm proud that I was able to change attitudes by sending out these proposals around the world which said we can no longer treat our athletes like patients."

—Robert Steadward, 2001

After serving the maximum of three terms as president of the IPC, Steadward was succeeded by Philip Craven in 2001. The IPC was composed of 37 national federations in 1989. At the time of his retirement, the Paralympic Games had 172 nations involved and more than one million spectators in attendance. In 2002, the Commonwealth Games integrated disabled sports into its program, as a result of Steadwards's efforts.

== Later career ==
Steadward served on several sub-committees within the IOC which included, the Olympic Truce Foundation, environment and reforms, and the co-ordinating group for the 2008 Summer Olympics. On behalf of the Canadian Olympic Committee and the CPC, he was a board member of the bid committee to host the 2010 Winter Olympics and the 2010 Winter Paralympics in Vancouver. He also served as board member for the 2005 World Masters Games hosted in Edmonton.

Steadward has also worked as an agent for international athletes and country musicians. He was an agent for gold medal Olympians Jamie Salé and David Pelletier during their 2001 Four Continents Figure Skating Championships.

== Publications ==
List of select publications by Steadward:

- Wheelchair sports classification system (1978)
- Paralympics (1997)
- Adapted physical activity (2000)

== Personal life ==
Steadward married Laura Thompson in 1967, whom he met while studying at the University of Alberta. The couple later had two daughters. He is a fan of the rodeo, and has served as president of the River City Roundup Festival, Miss Rodeo Canada, and Friends of Pro Rodeo. He resides in Edmonton.

== Honours and awards ==
Steadward was inducted into the Alberta Sports Hall of Fame in 1984. In 1995, he received the Robert Jackson Award and the King Clancy Award. The King Clancy Award recognizes contributions to Canadians with disabilities. In 1996, he was inducted into the Edmonton Sports Hall of Fame, and became the namesake of the Dr. Robert D. Steadward Award. In 1997, he received the University of Alberta Rutherford Award. The Rutherford Award recognizes outstanding teaching to undergraduates.

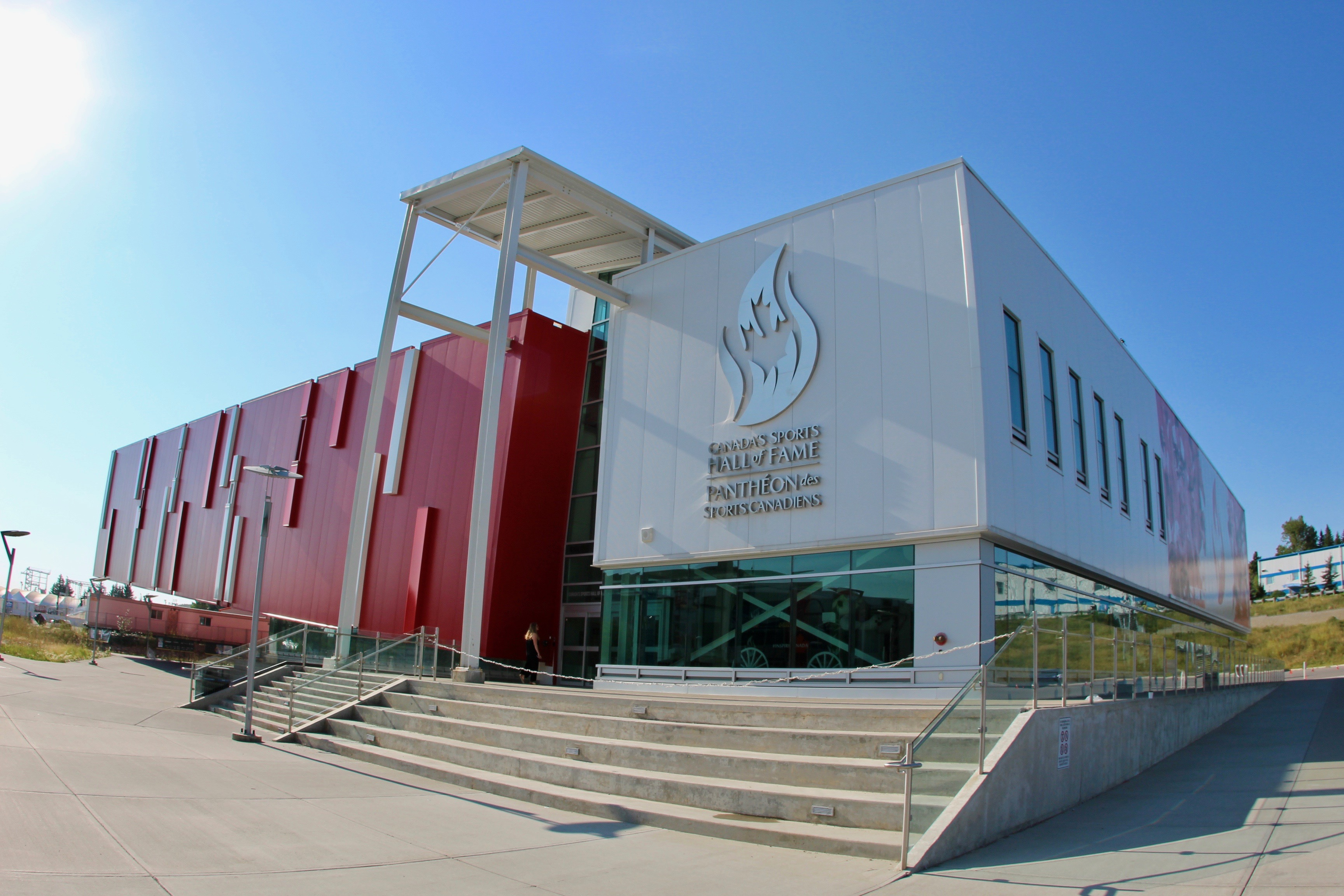
Canada's Sports Hall of Fame

In 1999, he was appointed Officer of the Order of Canada. He was inducted into the Canadian Paralympic Hall of Fame in 2000. In 2001, he was made an honorary life president of the International Paralympic Committee, and named Professor Emeritus at the University of Alberta. In 2002, he was inducted into the Canadian Disability Hall of Fame and he received the Queen Elizabeth II Golden Jubilee Medal. In 2005, he was named Albertan of the Century in Sport. In 2007, he was inducted into Canada's Sports Hall of Fame in the builder category. In 2010, he was appointed to the Alberta Order of Excellence, and received the President's Award from the Canadian Sport Tourism Alliance. In December 2020, Steadward was elevated to the rank of Companion within the Order of Canada.

Steadward is an honorary life member of the Paralympic Sports Association, the Alberta Wheelchair Sports Association, the Canadian Wheelchair Sports Association, and the Canadian Paralympic Committee. Other sports and service honours include; member of the International Olympic Order, member of the International Paralympic Order, honorary life member of the Canadian Olympic Committee, the Lois Hole Community Development Award, and induction into the University of Alberta Sports Hall of Fame.

Other academic honours include; the University of Alberta Alumni of Distinction, honorary degrees from the University of Alberta and Université catholique de Louvain, and an honorary diploma from MacEwan University.

== Legacy ==
Steadward is known in Edmonton as "Bob the Builder". The Research and Training Centre for Athletes with Disabilities he founded in 1978, was later known as the Rick Hansen Centre after the conclusion of the Man in Motion Tour. It was rededicated as the Steadward Centre for Personal and Physical Achievement in 2000.

The Lieutenant Governor of Alberta credited Steadward for bringing attention to the Paralympic movement, and stated that he "served to inspire all people with disability to pursue more active lifestyles". The Steadward Centre for Personal and Physical Achievement which he founded was credited for being a "model for independence and fitness training for people with disability". Canada's Sports Hall of Fame credited Steadward for promoting disability sport internationally, and "giving the Paralympics an unprecedented level of support, respect and funding".
