= Canadian Adaptive Snowsports =

Canadian charity

Canadian Adaptive Snowsports Sports de glisse adaptés Canada
- Legal status: National charity
- Purpose: Adaptive snowsports
- Headquarters: Sainte-Anne-des-Lacs, Quebec
- Website: www.cads.ski

Canadian Adaptive Snowsports (CADS, formerly Canadian Association for Disabled Skiing) is a national charity that assists individuals with disabilities to participate in snow skiing and snowboarding, at recreational and competitive levels. CADS is a national-level organization consisting of 11 divisions and 67 programs across Canada. In 2019, there were more than 5,200 members. CADS seeks to serve participants with all disabilities including people with visual impairments, autism spectrum disorders, cognitive impairments and physical impairments.

The organization started as an idea of Jerry Johnston, the ski school director of Sunshine Village (now Banff Sunshine Village) on the Alberta–British Columbia border. In 1963, he started the first program for disabled skiers in Canada and with his wife Annie founded CADS in 1976. Both were inducted into the Canadian Disability Hall of Fame in 2014. He served as the organization's executive director for three decades. Snowboarder Christian Hrab has been the CADS executive director since 2015.

CADS provides standardized instructor certification programs across its divisions and clubs, with four levels of instructors for the difficulty levels of slopes. In 2022, the organization had 1,600 certified instructors and coaches and 1,500 volunteers. CADS also organizes races and competitions, most notably a week-long annual international ski meet.

CADS Instructor courses are Canadian Ski Instructors' Alliance (CSIA) accredited. CADS is a partner of the Active Living Alliance for Canadians with a Disability.

== See also ==
- Canadian Ski Instructors' Alliance
- Canadian Association of Snowboard Instructors
