= Canadian Ski Instructors' Alliance =

Professional association

Canadian Ski Instructors' Alliance Alliance des moniteurs de ski du Canada
- Formation: 1938
- Purpose: Ski teaching
- Headquarters: Montreal, Quebec
- Location: Canada
- Website: www.snowpro.com

The Canadian Ski Instructors' Alliance (CSIA), founded in 1938, is an association of more than twenty thousand professional skiers located across Canada. The CSIA's purposes are to ensure a nationwide ski teaching standard through the development of effective skiing techniques and teaching methods and promote the importance of ski safety.

The organisation grants four general levels of certification, modular certification in snow park instruction, as well as ongoing professional development for ski instructors. Each successive level demonstrates competence in ski instruction, pedagogy, as well as individual ski performance.

== History ==
The CSIA was founded in 1938.

Today, the CSIA is divided into six regional chapters: British Columbia/Yukon, Alberta, Central, Ontario, Québec and Atlantic.

The national office is the centralization point of all activities. Main responsibilities include communications, as well as programs and educational development.

== Certifications ==
The CSIA has a total of four certification levels for instructors, as well as two snow park certification levels.

The first level of certification, "Level 1", is accessible to any intermediate-level skier who is at least 14 years of age. It can usually be obtained after a 3-day certification course. Each region in Canada has a coordinator who organizes Level 1 courses within their specific regions. Nevertheless, candidates may pursue their certifications within other regions. For example, a skier from the Quebec region may follow his or her instructor training and obtain certification in New Brunswick, which is part of the Atlantic region.

There is also an independent certification, "Snow Park Level 1", designed for skiers and instructors with park experience who are interested in teaching others in snow park. Since the pedagogical material seen in the Snow Park Level 1 certification course is similar to that in the Level 1 course, snow park instructors can be admitted to the Level 2 training course without holding a Level 1 certification. A Snow Park Level 2 certification course is also available.

The second level of certification, "Level 2", is accessible to Level 1 or Snow Park Level 1 certified ski instructors who have paid their membership dues to the CSIA, as well as members of provincial partner organisations, such as the PESQ in Quebec or OT3 in Ontario, who wish to pursue their training with the CSIA for national recognition of certification. They must complete two-day training courses in both skiing and teaching development as well as pass a two-day examination.

The third level of certification, "Level 3", is considered a senior certification available to Level 2 certified ski instructors in good standing with the CSIA. It consists of three-day training courses in both skiing and teaching development as well as a two-day examination that includes ski-offs assessed by at least four Level 3 course conductors, all of whom must hold a Level 4 certification. Many instructors train for several years and make several attempts before successfully sitting the certification exam.

The CSIA can also issue International Ski Instructors' Alliance (ISIA) stamps to members who are Level 3 certified. In addition to Level 3 certification, avalanche skills training, valid first aid certification and a minimum of 320 hours of education credits are required. Additional hours can be obtained through either CSIA Level 4 certification or certification with a partner industry organisation, such as the Canadian Association of Snowboard Instructors (CASI), the Canadian Ski Coaches Federation (CSCF), the Canadian Association for Disabled Skiing (CADS), the Canadian Association of Nordic Ski Instructors (CANSI), the Canadian Ski Guide Association (CSGA), or the Canadian Freestyle Ski Association (CFSA).

The fourth and final level of certification, "Level 4", can be delivered only by senior course conductors and evaluators, who themselves hold a Level 4 certification. A three-day examination, including ski-offs assessed by at least ten Level 4 course conductors, is required and the certification is notoriously difficult to attain. For instance, in the 2021-2022 ski season, fewer than 50 new Level 4 skiers were certified according to the organisation's official Facebook page.

Training and certification programs are also available for senior instructors (Levels 3 and 4) who wish to partake in the delivery of CSIA certification courses as course conductors and evaluators.

== Membership ==
=== Regular member ===
Most ski instructors are regular members of the CSIA. They may work in any ski resort across Canada, the United States, Australia, and the countries of Europe.

=== Associate member ===
Ski instructors holding certifications from other certifying bodies, such as the PESA in Quebec, may apply to become associate members in order to pursue further certification with the CSIA.

=== 25-Year member ===
The CSIA offers a merit certification for ski instructors that have been part of the organisation for twenty-five or more consecutive years. The celebrated members are normally awarded a "25 year member" pin, as well as a certificate, recognizing their efforts in the field.

=== Affiliate member ===
Affiliate members are mostly ski instructors who are certified by the ISIA.

== Governing board ==
The governing board of the CSIA is made up of six individuals who represent the regional boards in Canada.

For the 2024–2025 season, the board members include:

- Gunars Kazaks (CSIA 4 CC), Chair and National Representative of Ontario
- James Lindsey (CSIA 3, ACA DL), Vice-Chair and National Representative of Central
- Lucia Glasse-Davies (CSIA 4, ACA DL), Secretary and National Representative of British-Columbia
- Nathan Reece (CSIA 4, CSCF 1), Treasurer and National Representative of Atlantic
- Colin Borrow (CSIA 4, CSCF 2), National Representative of Alberta
- Eric Bonin (CSIA 4 CC), National Representative of Québec / National Board Liaison to TEC Committee

== Regional Board Of Directors ==
The regional boards of the Canadian Ski Instructors' Alliance are as follows:

- The regional board of British Columbia is made up of eleven members of the CSIA;
- The regional board of the Atlantic region includes representatives from Prince Edward Island, New Brunswick, Newfoundland and Labrador, and Nova Scotia;
- The regional board of Quebec is made up of ten members, who are elected every few years;
- The regional board of Ontario is made up of up to 9 members;
- The regional board of the Central region is made up of ski instructors representing Saskatchewan, Manitoba, and Northwestern Ontario;
- The regional committee of Alberta includes eight ski instructors.

== National helmet use policy ==
Helmets have been shown to reduce the incidence of severe head injuries. Since 2014, the CSIA requires that a helmet be worn by all course conductors on duty as well as those in uniform. Additionally, course participants are required to wear a helmet for the freeride/snowpark and GS modules.

== Associated organisations ==
- Canadian Association of Snowboard Instructors
- Canadian Ski Coaches Federation
- Canadian Adaptive Snowsports
- Ontario Track 3 - Ski Association
- Canadian Association of Nordic Ski Instructors
- International Ski Instructors' Alliance
