= Bachelor of Physical Education =

Undergraduate degree in Physical Exucation

A Bachelor of Physical Education (BPE or BPhEd) is a bachelor degree granted by some universities. In many Canadian universities it has been replaced by a Bachelor of Kinesiology. The degree can include topics such as sport science, coaching, and outdoor education. In India, Bachelor of Physical Education Degree is known as B.P.Ed. or B.P.E.. There are two levels at which this degree is offered. Some Indian Institutes offer a 1 or 2-years B.P.Ed. which can be pursued only after graduation. While some Institutes offer a 3–4 years of B.P.E. and B.Sc. (P.E, H.E&S) which requires 10+2 as eligibility criteria. In Bangladesh, University of Chittagong has B.P.E. (4 Years) degree under the Department of Physical Education and Sports Science.

A Master of Physical Education (MPE or MPhEd) is a postgraduate academic degree in physical education awarded by universities. Sports Specialization curriculum.

- Athletics
- Gymnastics
- Team Game
- Individual game
