= Canadian Wheelchair Sports Association =

Governing body for wheelchair rugby in Canada

- Sport: wheelchair rugby
- Category: Wheelchair Sports
- Jurisdiction: Wheelchair Sports in Canada
- Abbreviation: CWSA
- Founded: 1967
- Headquarters: Ottawa, Ontario
- Location: Ottawa, Ontario
- President: Dr. Donald Royer
- CEO: Catherine Cadieux
- Other key staff: Catherine Cadieux, Andy Van Neutegem, Duncan Campbell, Don Lane
- Sponsor: Sport Canada

Official website
- www.cwsa.ca
- (Canada)

The Canadian Wheelchair Sports Association (CWSA) (French: Association canadienne des sports en fauteuil roulant (ACSFR)) is a non-profit organization and the governing body for wheelchair rugby in Canada. The organization represents Canada in the International Wheelchair Rugby Federation (IWRF), Own the Podium, and the national wheelchair rugby team in the Canadian Paralympic Committee. The CWSA's president is Dr. Donald Royer of Sherbrooke, Quebec.

The organization is responsible for the selection and training of the teams that represent Canada in international tournaments, including the World Championships and Games of the Paralympiad and the qualifiers therefore, as well as for the promotion of the sport amongst prospective players, spectators, and fans.

== Organization ==
Canadian Wheelchair Sports Association (106868706RR0001) was registered with Canadian Revenue Agency as a Canadian amateur athletic association (RCAAA); therefore, they can issue official donation receipts and are eligible to receive gifts from registered charities since 1972-04-25.
