= Canadian Association of Snowboard Instructors =

Canadian professional organisation

- Abbreviation: CASI
- Formation: 1994
- Type: Nonprofit Organization
- Purpose: Snowboarding Education
- Headquarters: Cambridge, Ontario
- Official languages: English / French
- Key people: Dan Genge (CEO); Jeff Chandler (National Technical Coordinator)
- Website: casi-acms.com

The Canadian Association of Snowboard Instructors (CASI) is Canada's national professional snowboard teaching organisation.

CASI is the oldest snowboard teaching organisation in North America, founded in 1994, three years before the founding of AASI. Headquartered in Cambridge, Ontario, CASI is organised into six regions in Canada.

CASI runs teaching courses and certifies instructors in Canada, Japan, South Korea, and Andorra.

== Organisation ==
CASI is organised into six regions: British Columbia, Alberta, Manitoba/Saskatchewan, Ontario, Quebec, and Atlantic. CASI has a Technical and Evaluation Committee that considers course content and technical principles.

== Membership ==
To become a member of CASI, it is necessary to pass an instructor certification course. CASI offers four levels of instructor certification and an additional freestyle certification. Instructors are evaluated on technical skills and teaching skills.

The CASI level 1 course is recognized as credit for graduation in the Canadian province of British Columbia.
