= Megan McNamara =

Canadian beach volleyball player (born 1997)

Personal information
- Full name: Megan Norma McNamara
- Nationality: Canadian
- Born: August 1, 1997 (age 29); Richmond, British Columbia
- Hometown: Vancouver, British Columbia
- Height: 1.75 m (5 ft 9 in)
- Education: UCLA
Medal record
Representing Canada
Women's beach volleyball
NORCECA Beach Volleyball Tour
Silver medal – second place	2018 Punta Cana	Beach
Senior Beach Nationals (Canada)
Gold medal – first place	2018 Toronto	Beach
WUC Beach Volleyball
Gold medal – first place	2018 Munich	Beach
FIVB U21 World Championships
Bronze medal – third place	2016 Lucerne	Beach
Youth Olympic Games
Silver medal – second place	2014 Nanjing	Beach
FIVB U19 World Championships
Bronze medal – third place	2014 Porto	Beach

Megan Norma McNamara (born August 1, 1997) is a Canadian beach volleyball player. Along with her twin sister, Nicole McNamara, Megan has competed in many beach volleyball events around the world. From the fall of 2015 until the spring of 2019, Megan competed collegiately for the UCLA Bruins, leading the team to its first Pac-12 and NCAA titles in the sport during the 2018 season, and a second NCAA championship in the 2019 season.

== Early life ==
Megan was born in Richmond, British Columbia, and attended high school in Greater Vancouver, at South Delta Secondary School. Her first notable achievement in international beach volleyball competition was winning the bronze medal at the 2014 FIVB Beach Volleyball U19 World Championships. Three weeks later, they won the silver medal at the 2014 Summer Youth Olympics after being defeated in a 3-set-final.

== Beach volleyball career ==
=== University experience ===
In 2015, Megan became a member of UCLA Bruins beach volleyball team. She and her sister went 16-12 in dual matches on court one during the 2016 season, leading the team to a 22-8 overall record and third place finishes in both the inaugural Pac-12 and NCAA tournaments, and fourth-place ranking nationally. During the season, she and Nicole were named Pac-12 Pair of the Week for the week of April 4, to the All-Pac-12 and Pac-12 All-Freshman First Teams, and to the AVCA Collegiate Beach All-America Team.

During the 2017 season, Megan and Nicole improved to 28-7 in dual matches, leading the Bruins to a 30-6 overall record. The team finished runner-up at the Pac-12 Beach Volleyball Championships by a single match, but was defeated in the NCAA tournament in its third match after falling to Florida State in the Elimination Bracket. During the season, she and Nicole were named Pac-12 Pair of the Week for the weeks of March 14 and April 11. As with her freshman year, Megan earned both All-Pac-12 First Team and AVCA All-American honours. She was named to the Pac-12 All-Academic First Team for beach volleyball following the season for her performance in the classroom her sophomore year.

During the 2018 season, Megan and Nicole went 35-7 in dual matches, leading the UCLA Bruins to a 40-4 overall record and to their first Pac-12 and NCAA championships, beating the University of Southern California (USC) and Florida State, respectively. Once again, the sisters were honoured as members of the All-Pac-12 First Team, and as All-Americans in the process. Additionally, the McNamara twins were named Pac-12 Pair of the Year in the week following completion of the championship. Following the season, Megan was once again named to the Pac-12 All-Academic First Team to honour her performance in the classroom for her junior year.

During the 2019 season, Megan and Nicole went 32-4 in dual matches, leading the UCLA Bruins to a 35-3 overall record and their second consecutive NCAA championship, beating USC in the final match. Additionally, they finished runner-up to USC at the Pac-12 championship. One final time in their collegiate careers, both sisters were honoured as members of the All-Pac-12 First Team and as AVCA Collegiate All-Americans. Additionally, the McNamaras were named Pac-12 and AVCA/CollegeBeachVB.com Pair of the Week for the week of April 2.

=== International competition ===
At the 2016 FIVB Beach Volleyball U21 World Championships, Megan and Nicole won the bronze medal by coming back from one set down (18-21, 23-21, 15-10) against the United States' Sarah Sponcil and Torrey Van Winden in the third place match.

In May 2018, Megan and Nicole competed in their first FIVB World Tour event, the Bangkok 1 star, winning five matches and advancing to the semifinals before eventually finishing in fourth place. In early June 2018, Megan and Nicole won the women's competition at the 2018 Volleyball Canada NORCECA Open Beach Trials in Toronto, earning the top ranking for Canada for subsequent competition in the 2018 NORCECA Beach Volleyball Tour. Later in the month, they competed in their second FIVB World Tour event, the Singapore Open 2 star, advancing through the qualifying rounds to pool play, before barely missing out on the quarterfinal round due to point differentials. Megan and Nicole then competed at the Die Techniker Beach Tour event in Nuremberg, earning a fifth place finish after a three-set loss to the tournament's fourth place finisher. In mid-July 2018, the McNamaras competed at that year's FISU World University Beach Volleyball Championship in Munich, winning the gold medal in the championship with a three set win against Spain. Later in July, she and Megan also competed at FIVB 3 star tour events in both Haiyang and Tokyo. In mid-August, she and her sister won the Canadian championship at the 2018 Senior Beach Nationals in Toronto, winning seven total matches including a three-set win over the team of Gordon and Bukovec in the final.

As a result of winning the Canadian NORCECA Open Beach Trials in June, Megan and Nicole qualified to compete in NORCECA beach volleyball tour events later in the year. Competing at the Punta Cana (Dominican Republic) tour stop in late September, they placed second to the American team of Falyn Fonoimoana and Molly Turner.

== Accolades ==
- Champion, 2018 Senior Beach Nationals (Canada)
- Champion, 2018 WUC Beach Volleyball (representing Canada)
- 2x NCAA Champion, Beach Volleyball (2018 & 2019, representing UCLA)
- 4x AVCA Collegiate Beach Volleyball All-American (2016-2019)
- 2018 VolleyMob All-American, Beach Volleyball
- 2018 Pac-12 Pair of the Year (with Nicole McNamara)
- 4x First-team All-Pac-12 (2016-2019)
- First-team Pac-12 All-Academic (2018, 2017)
- 2016 Pac-12 All-Freshman First Team
- 5x Pac-12 Pair of the Week (with Nicole McNamara, 2016-2019)
- 2019 AVCA/CollegeBeachVB.com Pair of the Week (with Nicole McNamara, for April 2)
- Bronze Medalist, Beach Volleyball, 2016 FIVB U21 World Championships
- Silver Medalist, Beach Volleyball, 2014 Summer Youth Olympics
- Bronze Medalist, Beach Volleyball, 2014 FIVB U19 World Championships

Sporting positions
Preceded by Sara Hughes and Kelly Claes (USA)	WUC Beach Volleyball Champion alongside Nicole McNamara; 2018	Succeeded by Julia Scoles and Hailey Harward (USA)
Awards
Preceded by Sara Hughes and Kelly Claes (USC)	Pac-12 Pair of the Year alongside Nicole McNamara; 2018	Succeeded by Abril Bustamante and Tīna Graudiņa (USC)
