= FIVB Beach Volleyball U19 World Championships =

International youth volleyball tournament

The FIVB Beach Volleyball U19 World Championships (previously known as the FIVB Beach Volleyball Swatch Youth World Championships) is a double-gender international beach volleyball tournament for athletes under the age of 19. The competition first took place in Xylokastro, Greece, in 2002. Prior to the 2025 edition, it was an under-19 tournament. In the 2025 edition, the tournament was changed back to under-18.

== Results summary ==
=== Men ===
Men's U18 / U19 World Championship
Year	Host	Champions	Runners-up	3rd place	4th place
2002	(Greece); Xylokastro	Ian Borges and Pedro Solberg Salgado (BRA)	Andreas Gortsianiouk and Thodoris Papadimitriou (GRE)	Ruslan Dayanov and Yaroslav Koshkarev (RUS)	Kamil Lyczko and Sebastian Pecherz (POL)
2003	(Thailand); Pattaya	Sebastian Fuchs and Thomas Kaczmarek (GER)	Ian Borges and Pedro Solberg Salgado (BRA)	Tomasz Sinczak and Rafal Szternel (POL)	Michel Mokondoko and Juan Virgen (MEX)
2004	(Italy); Termoli	Arunas Kirsnys and Arvydas Miseikis (LIT)	Zbigniew Bartman and Michał Kubiak (POL)	Ingars Ivanovs and Jānis Šmēdiņš (LAT)	Reid Hall and Adam Podstawka (CAN)
2005 (Note: From 2005–2024, the tournament was changed from under-18 to under-19.)	(France); Saint-Quay-Portrieux	Tine Urnaut and Nejc Zemljak (SLO)	Joey Dykstra and Mark van Zwieten (USA)	Grzegorz Fijałek and Michal Matyja (POL)	Jonathan Erdmann and Stefan Windscheif (GER)
2006	Bermuda	Jonathan Erdmann and Marvin Klass (GER)	Francesco Giontella and Paolo Nicolai (ITA)	Matteo Ingrosso and Paolo Ingrosso (ITA)	Brice Thesee and Renaud Ventresque (FRA)
2007	(Poland); Mysłowice	Michał Kądzioła and Jakub Szałankiewicz (POL)	Stefan Köhler and Malte Stiel (GER)	Vitalii Didukh and Pavlo Ostapenko (UKR)	Marcin Kantor and Damian Wojtasik (POL)
2008	(Netherlands); The Hague	Kristo Kollo and Oliver Venno (EST)	Jeffrey Carlson and Antonio Ciarelli (USA)	Marek Leznicki and Damian Wojtasik (POL)	Víctor Bouza and Jesús Castizo (ESP)
2009	(Turkey); Alanya	Sergiy Popov and Valeriy Samoday (UKR)	Andrey Bolgov and Ruslan Bykanov (RUS)	Kevin Medina and César Menéndez (ESP)	Michel Bargmann and Felix Quecke (GER)
2010	(Portugal); Porto	Piotr Kantor and Bartosz Łosiak (POL)	Maxim Anufriev and Artem Kucherenko (RUS)	Lorenz Schümann and Dominik Stork (GER)	Nick Del Bianco and Garrett May (CAN)
2011	(Croatia); Umag	Łukasz Kaczmarek and Maciej Kosiak (POL)	Runar Sannarnes and Andreas Takvam (NOR)	Aaron Nusbaum and Grant O'Gorman (CAN)	Benjamin Lerch and Dennis Lerch (SUI)
2012	(Cyprus); Larnaca	Michal Bryl and Kacper Kujawiak (POL)	Sebastian Kaczemarek and Łukasz Kaczmarek (POL)	Viacheslav Kirienko and Dmitry Uraikin (RUS)	Martin Ermacora and Lukas Stranger (AUT)
2013	(Portugal); Porto	Moritz Reichert and Clemens Wickler (GER)	Bjarne Huus and Christian Sørum (NOR)	Torey DeFalco and Lucas Yoder (USA)	Lukas Každailis and Arnas Rumševičius (LIT)
2014	(Portugal); Porto	Arthur Lanci and George Wanderley (BRA)	Illia Kovaliov and Oleh Plotnytskyi (UKR)	Tigrito Gómez and Peter Hernández (VEN)	Jasper Bouter and Tom van Steenis (NED)
2016	(Cyprus); Larnaca	Renato Carvalho and Rafael Quiero (BRA)	Florian Breer and Yves Haussener (SUI)	Mihails Samoilovs and Kristaps Smits (LAT)	Rémi Bassereau and Timothée Platre (FRA)
2018	(China); Nanjing	Denis Shekunov and Dmitrii Veretiuk (RUS)	Filip John and Lukas Pfretzschner (GER)	Alexey Gusev and Pavel Shustrov (RUS)	Bautista Amieva and Mauro Zelayeta (ARG)
2021	(Thailand); Phuket	Arthur Canet and Téo Rotar (FRA)	Wachirawit Muadpha and Netitorn Muneekul (THA)	Nicolas Capretti and Samuel Oselame (BRA)	Ivan Chuprinov and Vladislav Panchenko (RUS)
2022	(Turkey); Dikili	Gustavs Auziņš and Kristians Fokerots (LAT)	Olivers Bulgačs and Dāvis Teteris (LAT)	Arthur Canet and Téo Rotar (FRA)	Raoul Acerbi and Andrea Armellini (ITA)
2024	(China); Shangluo	Szymon Pietraszek and Jakub Krzemiński (POL)	Matīss Šalkovskis and Karlis Jaundžeikars (LAT)	Amir Ali Ghalehnovi and Habib Akbarzadeh (IRI)	Inés Vargas and Carlos Ayala (MEX)
2025	(Qatar); Doha	Ludvig Sødal Ringøen and Sebastian Kjemperud (NOR)	Jonathan Bungert and Filo Wüst (GER)	Riccardo Santomassimo and Marco Di Felice (ITA)	Barış Güldali and Polat Kemal Eser (TUR)
2026	(Netherlands); The Hague	Lasse Hüper and Filo Wüst (GER)	Ryan Edgar and Thomas Turner (AUS)	Adrien Bézu and Quentin Hypolyte (FRA)	Alan Robak and Igor Gliszczyński (POL)

=== Women ===
Women's U18 / U19 World Championship
Year	Host	Champions	Runners-up	3rd place	4th place
2002	(Greece); Xylokastro	Sanne Keizer & Arjanne Stevens (NED)	Claudia Lehmann & Friederike Romberg (GER)	Ruth Flemig & Ilka Semmler (GER)	Isabel Grael & Carolina Solberg Salgado (BRA)
2003	(Thailand); Pattaya	Jana Köhler & Laura Ludwig (GER)	Carolina Solberg Salgado & Bárbara Seixas (BRA)	Frederike Fischer & Sandra Piasecki (GER)	Diana Estrada & Martha Revuelta (MEX)
2004	(Italy); Termoli	Katarzyna Urban & Joanna Wiatr (POL)	Carolina Solberg Salgado & Bárbara Seixas (BRA)	Florentina Büttner & Julia Sude (GER)	Marleen van Iersel & Margo Wiltens (NED)
2005 (Note: From 2005–2024, the tournament was changed from under-18 to under-19.)	(France); Saint-Quay-Portrieux	Carolina Aragão & Bárbara Seixas (BRA)	Katarzyna Urban & Joanna Wiatr (POL)	Florentina Büttner & Julia Sude (GER)	Veronika Opravilová & Markéta Sluková (CZE)
2006	Bermuda	Becchara Palmer & Alice Rohkamper (AUS)	Daniëlle Remmers & Marleen van Iersel (NED)	Britta Büthe & Svenja Engelhardt (GER)	Tanja Goricanec & Taryn Sciarini (SUI)
2007	(Poland); Mysłowice	Daniëlle Remmers & Michelle Stiekema (NED)	Gilda Lombardo & Marta Menegatti (ITA)	Iveta Halbichová & Barbora Jerábková (CZE)	Monika Brzostek & Weronika Kurek (POL)
2008	(Netherlands); The Hague	Chantal Laboureur & Levke Spinger (GER)	Rimke Braakman & Sophie van Gestel (NED)	Irina Chaika & Ekaterina Karapischenko (RUS)	Beata Galek & Daria Paszek (POL)
2009	(Turkey); Alanya	Christine Aulenbrock & Victoria Bieneck (GER)	Irina Chaika & Ekaterina Karapischenko (RUS)	Ksenia Sukhareva & Maria Ushkova (RUS)	Olga Samul & Izabela Soja (POL)
2010	(Portugal); Porto	Jane Croson & Summer Ross (USA)	Ekaterina Karapischenko & Maria Ushkova (RUS)	Taliqua Clancy & Eliza Hynes (AUS)	Rebecca Cavalcante & Juliana Simões (BRA)
2011	(Croatia); Umag	Karolina Baran & Katarzyna Kociołek (POL)	Lena Plesiutschnig & Katharina Schützenhöfer (AUT)	Lin Lingling & Zhang Changning (CHN)	Pauline Martin & Lisa Menet-Haure (FRA)
2012	(Cyprus); Larnaca	Ieva Dumbauskaitė & Monika Povilaitytė (LIT)	Karolina Baran & Katarzyna Kociołek (POL)	Ksenia Dabizha & Anna Gorbunova (RUS)	Sandra Ittlinger & Yanina Weiland (GER)
2013	(Portugal); Porto	Eduarda Santos Lisboa & Tainá Silva (BRA)	Anna Gorbunova & Nadezda Makroguzova (RUS)	Kelly Claes & Sara Hughes (USA)	Sarah Schneider & Lara Schreiber (GER)
2014	(Portugal); Porto	Eduarda Santos Lisboa & Andressa Ramalho (BRA)	Lisa Arnholdt & Sarah Schneider (GER)	Megan McNamara & Nicole McNamara (CAN)	Kristýna Adamčíková & Kateřina Valková (CZE)
2016	(Cyprus); Larnaca	Eduarda Santos Lisboa & Victoria Tosta (BRA)	Nika Daalderop & Mexime van Driel (NED)	Milica Mirkovic & Kathryn Plummer (USA)	Ana Carolina Almeida & Vitória Rodrigues (BRA)
2018	(China); Nanjing	Maria Bocharova & Maria Voronina (RUS)	Raïsa Schoon & Emi van Driel (NED)	Daniela Álvarez & Tania Moreno (ESP)	Devon Newberry & Lindsey Sparks (USA)
2021	(Thailand); Phuket	Megan Kraft & Delayne Maple (USA)	Olga Gavrilova & Alina Salmanova (RUS)	Anhelina Khmil & Tetiana Lazarenko (UKR)	Xolani Hodel & Katherine Reilly (USA)
2022	(Turkey); Dikili	Daria Romaniuk & Yeva Serdiuk (UKR)	Myriah Massey & Ashley Pater (USA)	Emma Glagau & Ruby Sorra (CAN)	Sophie Kubiak & Bailey Showalter (USA)
2024	(China); Shangluo	Myriah Massey & Lily Davis (USA)	Sofía Izuzquiza & Marta Carro (ESP)	Sally Perez & Sarah Wood (USA)	Varagkhana Sogalee & Somruedee Koedkaew (THA)
2025	(Qatar); Doha	Jordyn Scribner & Ella Grimes (USA)	Avery Junk & Addison Junk (USA)	Lente Thant & Simone Vervloet (BEL)	Esmee Radstake & Jara Both (NED)
2026	(Netherlands); The Hague	Anna-Chiara Reformat & Sandra Otte (GER)	Leticia Schwalb & Kiara Ernesto (BRA)	Jara Both & Matilda de Groot (NED)	Qi Siyu & Zhuang Ming (CHN)

== Medals table ==
Rank	Nation	Gold	Silver	Bronze	Total
1	Germany	8	5	6	19
2	Poland	7	4	3	14
3	Brazil	7	4	1	12
4	United States	4	4	4	12
5	Russia	2	6	6	14
6	Netherlands	2	4	1	7
7	Ukraine	2	1	2	5
8	Lithuania	2	0	0	2
9	Latvia	1	2	2	5
10	Norway	1	2	0	3
11	Australia	1	1	1	3
12	France	1	0	2	3
13	Estonia	1	0	0	1
13	Slovenia	1	0	0	1
15	Italy	0	2	2	4
16	Spain	0	1	2	3
17	Austria	0	1	0	1
17	Greece	0	1	0	1
17	Switzerland	0	1	0	1
17	Thailand	0	1	0	1
21	Canada	0	0	3	3
22	Belgium	0	0	1	1
22	China	0	0	1	1
22	Czech Republic	0	0	1	1
22	Iran	0	0	1	1
22	Venezuela	0	0	1	1
Totals (26 entries)		40	40	40	120
