= Beach volleyball at the 2014 Summer Youth Olympics =

Beach volleyball at the II Summer Youth Olympic Games
- Venue: Nanjing Olympic Sports Center
- Dates: 17–27 August
- No. of events: 2

Beach Volleyball at the 2014 Summer Youth Olympics was held from August 17 to August 27. This was the first time beach volleyball was held at the Youth Olympics with indoor volleyball appearing at the 2010 edition. The events took place at the Nanjing Olympic Sports Center in Nanjing, China.

== Qualification ==
A total of 36 teams participated in each gender category. Each National Olympic Committee (NOC) could enter a maximum of 2 teams of 2 athletes, 1 per each gender. As hosts, China was initially given the maximum quota, but only field a girls' team. A further 10 teams, 5 in each gender was to be decided by the Tripartite Commission, but only 5 were given. The other spots were reallocated to the top ranked teams not yet qualified. Each of the five volleyball federations hosted qualification events to qualify 12 teams, 6 in each gender.

Africa and Asia hosted a single qualification tournament while Europe created a Youth Continental Cup with different zonal stages ending with a final qualification tournament. South America created a six legged tour, though only five events were held where the six countries with the most points qualified and North, Central America and Caribbean hosted four zonal tournaments where the winners qualified to the Youth Olympics and a final tournament where the top two nations qualified.

Only athletes born between 1 January 1996 and 31 December 1999 were eligible to participate in the 2014 Youth Olympics.

=== Boys ===
Event	Location	Date	Total Teams	Qualified
Host Nation	-	-	0	China
EVCA Zone Qualification Tournament	(Saint Lucia) Pigeon Point	18–20 October 2013	1	Saint Vincent and the Grenadines
CAZOVA Zone Qualification Tournament	(Trinidad and Tobago) Maracus Bay	26–28 November 2013	1	Jamaica
Central Zone Qualification Tournament	(Puerto Rico) Fajardo	6–8 December 2013	1	Canada
AFECAVOL Zone Qualification Tournament	Guatemala City	1–2 February 2014	1	Guatemala
AVC Qualification Tournament	(Thailand) Nakhon Si Thammarat	4–6 April 2014	6	Indonesia; Iran; Kazakhstan; New Zealand; Sri Lanka; Thailand
CAVB Qualification Tournament	(Ghana) Accra	11–13 April 2014	6	Burundi; Republic of the Congo; Ghana; Nigeria; Rwanda; Sierra Leone
NORCECA Final Qualification Tournament	(Puerto Rico) Carolina	12–13 April 2014	2	Puerto Rico; United States
2014 CEV Youth Continental Cup Final	(Turkey) Antalya	15–17 May 2014	6	Finland; France; Germany; Poland; Russia; Ukraine
CSV Youth Tour Final Rankings	-	19 May 2014	6	Uruguay; Argentina; Venezuela; Peru; Paraguay; Brazil
Tripartite Invitation	-	-	3	Oman; São Tomé and Príncipe; Virgin Islands
Reallocation	-	-	3	Austria; Lithuania; Norway
TOTAL			36	

=== Girls ===
Event	Location	Date	Total Teams	Qualified
Host Nation	-	-	1	China
EVCA Zone Qualification Tournament	(Saint Lucia) Pigeon Point	18–20 October 2013	1	Saint Lucia
CAZOVA Zone Qualification Tournament	(Trinidad and Tobago) Maracus Bay	26–28 November 2013	1	Trinidad and Tobago
Central Zone Qualification Tournament	(Puerto Rico) Fajardo	6–8 December 2013	1	United States
AFECAVOL Zone Qualification Tournament	Guatemala City	1–2 February 2014	1	Guatemala
AVC Qualification Tournament	(Thailand) Nakhon Si Thammarat	4–6 April 2014	6	Australia; Chinese Taipei; Indonesia; Kazakhstan; Thailand; Vietnam
CAVB Qualification Tournament	(Ghana) Accra	11–13 April 2014	6	Republic of the Congo; Ghana; Namibia; Nigeria; Rwanda; Sierra Leone
NORCECA Final Qualification Tournament	(Puerto Rico) Carolina	12–13 April 2014	2	Canada; Puerto Rico
2014 CEV Youth Continental Cup Final	(Turkey) Antalya	15–17 May 2014	6	Czech Republic; France; Germany; Italy; Russia; Turkey
CSV Youth Tour Final Rankings	-	19 May 2014	6	Paraguay; Ecuador; Argentina; Uruguay; Brazil; Bolivia
Tripartite Invitation	-	-	2	Tuvalu; Vanuatu
Reallocation	-	-	3	Austria; Latvia; Switzerland
TOTAL			36	

== Schedule ==
The schedule was released by the Nanjing Youth Olympic Games Organizing Committee. During the group stage there will be three sessions per day in order for all teams to play their match. Likewise the quarterfinals will have two sessions in order for all teams to play on the two main courts.

All times are CST (UTC+8)

Event date	Event day	Starting time	Event details
August 17	Sunday	08:00; 15:00; 19:00	Boys' Group Stage; Girls' Group Stage
August 18	Monday	08:00; 15:00; 19:00	Boys' Group Stage; Girls' Group Stage
August 19	Tuesday	08:00; 15:00; 19:00	Boys' Group Stage; Girls' Group Stage
August 21	Thursday	08:00; 15:00; 19:00	Boys' Group Stage; Girls' Group Stage
August 22	Friday	08:00; 15:00; 19:00	Boys' Group Stage; Girls' Group Stage
August 24	Sunday	08:00	Boys' Round of 24; Girls' Round of 24
August 24	Sunday	18:00	Boys' Round of 16; Girls' Round of 16
August 25	Monday	15:00; 20:00	Boys' Quarterfinals; Girls' Quarterfinals
August 26	Tuesday	15:00	Girls' Semifinals
August 26	Tuesday	20:00	Girls' Medal Matches
August 27	Wednesday	15:00	Boys' Semifinals
August 27	Wednesday	20:00	Boys' Medal Matches

== Medal summary ==
=== Medal table ===
Rank	Nation	Gold	Silver	Bronze	Total
1	Brazil	1	0	0	1
1	Russia	1	0	0	1
3	Canada	0	1	0	1
3	Venezuela	0	1	0	1
5	Argentina	0	0	1	1
5	Germany	0	0	1	1
Totals (6 entries)		2	2	2	6

=== Events ===
Event	Gold	Silver	Bronze
Boys' Tournament	Russia; Oleg Stoyanovskiy; Artem Yarzutkin	Venezuela; José Tigrito Gómez; Rolando Hernández	Argentina; Santiago Aulisi; Leo Aveiro
Girls' Tournament	Brazil; Ana Patricia Silva Ramos; Eduarda Santos Lisboa	Canada; Megan McNamara; Nicole McNamara	Germany; Lisa Arnholdt; Sarah Schneider
