= 2025 FIVB Beach Volleyball U18 World Championships – Women's tournament =

Tournament details
- Host country: Qatar
- City: Doha
- Dates: 7–12 October
- Teams: (from 5 confederations)

Final positions
- Champions: United States; Jordyn Scribner; Ella Grimes (1st title)
- Runners-up: United States; Avery Junk; Addison Junk
- Third place: Belgium; Lente Thant; Simone Vervloet
- Fourth place: Netherlands; Esmee Radstake; Jara Both

The 2025 FIVB Beach Volleyball U18 World Championships – Women's tournament was held from 7 to 12 October 2025.

== Preliminary round ==
=== Pool A ===
Pos	Team	Pld	W	L	Pts	SW	SL	SR	SPW	SPL	SPR	Qualification
1	(United States) Scribner – Grimes	3	3	0	6	6	0	MAX	126	57	2.211	Round of 16
2	(Mexico) Perez – Román	3	2	1	5	4	2	2.000	113	74	1.527	Round of 24
3	(Malaysia) QARIESYA – Cadence	3	1	2	4	2	4	0.500	79	104	0.760	Round of 24
4	(Qatar) Penda – Meriem	3	0	3	3	0	6	0.000	43	126	0.341	

8 October 2025	Penda – Meriem (Qatar)	0–2	(United States) Scribner – Grimes
8 October 2025	(7–21, 2–21); Report

8 October 2025	Perez – Román (Mexico)	2–0	(Malaysia) QARIESYA – Cadence
8 October 2025	(21–8, 21–10); Report

9 October 2025	Perez – Román (Mexico)	0–2	(United States) Scribner – Grimes
9 October 2025	(12–21, 17–21); Report

9 October 2025	Penda – Meriem (Qatar)	0–2	(Malaysia) QARIESYA – Cadence
9 October 2025	(14–21, 6–21); Report

9 October 2025	Penda – Meriem (Qatar)	0–2	(Mexico) Perez – Román
9 October 2025	(6–21, 8–21); Report

9 October 2025	QARIESYA – Cadence (Malaysia)	0–2	(United States) Scribner – Grimes
9 October 2025	(14–21, 5–21); Report

=== Pool B ===
Pos	Team	Pld	W	L	Pts	SW	SL	SR	SPW	SPL	SPR	Qualification
1	(United States) Junk – Junk	3	3	0	6	6	0	MAX	126	62	2.032	Round of 16
2	(Brazil) Kiara – Leticia	3	2	1	5	4	2	2.000	108	84	1.286	Round of 24
3	(Paraguay) MARTINEZ – VELAZQUEZ	3	1	2	4	2	4	0.500	90	108	0.833	Round of 24
4	(Morocco) Marwa – Bouysfi	3	0	3	3	0	6	0.000	56	126	0.444	

8 October 2025	Junk – Junk (United States)	2–0	(Brazil) Kiara – Leticia
8 October 2025	(21–15, 21–9); Report

8 October 2025	Marwa – Bouysfi (Morocco)	0–2	(Paraguay) MARTINEZ – VELAZQUEZ
8 October 2025	(14–21, 10–21); Report

9 October 2025	Marwa – Bouysfi (Morocco)	0–2	(Brazil) Kiara – Leticia
9 October 2025	(12–21, 7–21); Report

9 October 2025	Junk – Junk (United States)	2–0	(Paraguay) MARTINEZ – VELAZQUEZ
9 October 2025	(21–12, 21–13); Report

9 October 2025	Junk – Junk (United States)	2–0	(Morocco) Marwa – Bouysfi
9 October 2025	(21–6, 21–7); Report

9 October 2025	MARTINEZ – VELAZQUEZ (Paraguay)	0–2	(Brazil) Kiara – Leticia
9 October 2025	(11–21, 12–21); Report

=== Pool C ===
Pos	Team	Pld	W	L	Pts	SW	SL	SR	SPW	SPL	SPR	Qualification
1	(Netherlands) Radstake – Both	3	3	0	6	6	0	MAX	126	83	1.518	Round of 16
2	(Hungary) Kiss-Bertók – Pádár	3	2	1	5	4	3	1.333	113	114	0.991	Round of 24
3	(Poland) Wolny – Przybyszewska	3	1	2	4	2	5	0.400	111	127	0.874	Round of 24
4	(Thailand) Varagkhana – Natthawiw	3	0	3	3	2	6	0.333	111	137	0.810	

8 October 2025	Varagkhana – Natthawiw (Thailand)	1–2	(Hungary) Kiss-Bertók – Pádár
8 October 2025	(21–8, 14–21, 9–15); Report

8 October 2025	Radstake – Both (Netherlands)	2–0	(Poland) Wolny – Przybyszewska
8 October 2025	(21–17, 21–16); Report

9 October 2025	Varagkhana – Natthawiw (Thailand)	1–2	(Poland) Wolny – Przybyszewska
9 October 2025	(21–14, 10–21, 12–15); Report

9 October 2025	Radstake – Both (Netherlands)	2–0	(Hungary) Kiss-Bertók – Pádár
9 October 2025	(21–10, 21–16); Report

9 October 2025	Varagkhana – Natthawiw (Thailand)	0–2	(Netherlands) Radstake – Both
9 October 2025	(12–21, 12–21); Report

9 October 2025	Wolny – Przybyszewska (Poland)	0–2	(Hungary) Kiss-Bertók – Pádár
9 October 2025	(9–21, 19–21); Report

=== Pool D ===
Pos	Team	Pld	W	L	Pts	SW	SL	SR	SPW	SPL	SPR	Qualification
1	(Italy) Bruzzone – Lafuenti	3	2	1	5	5	2	2.500	133	90	1.478	Round of 16
2	(Slovakia) Matyushenkova – Zelenakova	3	2	1	5	4	4	1.000	143	146	0.979	Round of 24
3	(Australia) Gaborit – Amstutz	3	1	2	4	3	4	0.750	118	136	0.868	Round of 24
4	(China) Fan Yuhan – Zhuang Ming	3	1	2	4	3	5	0.600	126	148	0.851	

8 October 2025	Gaborit – Amstutz (Australia)	2–0	(Slovakia) Matyushenkova – Zelenakova
8 October 2025	(21–16, 26–24); Report

8 October 2025	Fan Yuhan – Zhuang Ming (China)	0–2	(Italy) Bruzzone – Lafuenti
8 October 2025	(5–21, 17–21); Report

9 October 2025	Gaborit – Amstutz (Australia)	0–2	(Italy) Bruzzone – Lafuenti
9 October 2025	(11–21, 8–21); Report

9 October 2025	Fan Yuhan – Zhuang Ming (China)	1–2	(Slovakia) Matyushenkova – Zelenakova
9 October 2025	(18–21, 21–18, 11–15); Report

9 October 2025	Gaborit – Amstutz (Australia)	1–2	(China) Fan Yuhan – Zhuang Ming
9 October 2025	(21–17, 17–21, 14–16); Report

9 October 2025	Bruzzone – Lafuenti (Italy)	1–2	(Slovakia) Matyushenkova – Zelenakova
9 October 2025	(16–21, 21–13, 12–15); Report

=== Pool E ===
Pos	Team	Pld	W	L	Pts	SW	SL	SR	SPW	SPL	SPR	Qualification
1	(Switzerland) Gähwiler – Eugster	3	3	0	6	6	0	MAX	126	72	1.750	Round of 16
2	(Hungary) Honti-Majoros – Matkovits	3	2	1	5	4	2	2.000	113	99	1.141	Round of 24
3	(Japan) Utsunomiya – Sawano	3	1	2	4	2	5	0.400	100	141	0.709	Round of 24
4	(Ecuador) VALENTINA – Nuñez	3	0	3	3	1	6	0.167	112	139	0.806	

8 October 2025	Gähwiler – Eugster (Switzerland)	2–0	(Hungary) Honti-Majoros – Matkovits
8 October 2025	(21–14, 21–14); Report

8 October 2025	Utsunomiya – Sawano (Japan)	2–1	(Ecuador) VALENTINA – Nuñez
8 October 2025	(19–21, 21–14, 19–17); Report

9 October 2025	Gähwiler – Eugster (Switzerland)	2–0	(Ecuador) VALENTINA – Nuñez
9 October 2025	(21–10, 21–15); Report

9 October 2025	Utsunomiya – Sawano (Japan)	0–2	(Hungary) Honti-Majoros – Matkovits
9 October 2025	(16–21, 11–21); Report

9 October 2025	Gähwiler – Eugster (Switzerland)	2–0	(Japan) Utsunomiya – Sawano
9 October 2025	(21–11, 21–8); Report

10 October 2025	VALENTINA – Nuñez (Ecuador)	0–2	(Hungary) Honti-Majoros – Matkovits
10 October 2025	(10–21, 20–22); Report

=== Pool F ===
Pos	Team	Pld	W	L	Pts	SW	SL	SR	SPW	SPL	SPR	Qualification
1	(Belgium) Thant – Vervloet	3	3	0	6	6	1	6.000	142	100	1.420	Round of 16
2	(Austria) Hammarberg – Hofstetter	3	2	1	5	4	2	2.000	102	95	1.074	Round of 24
3	(Venezuela) Valeria – Ramirez	3	1	2	4	3	5	0.600	133	146	0.911	Round of 24
4	(Chile) Guerrero – Vasquez	3	0	3	3	1	6	0.167	102	138	0.739	

8 October 2025	Thant – Vervloet (Belgium)	2–0	(Chile) Guerrero – Vasquez
8 October 2025	(21–11, 21–16); Report

8 October 2025	Hammarberg – Hofstetter (Austria)	2–0	(Venezuela) Valeria – Ramirez
8 October 2025	(21–12, 21–12); Report

9 October 2025	Thant – Vervloet (Belgium)	2–1	(Venezuela) Valeria – Ramirez
9 October 2025	(21–18, 22–24, 15–13); Report

9 October 2025	Hammarberg – Hofstetter (Austria)	2–0	(Chile) Guerrero – Vasquez
9 October 2025	(21–17, 21–12); Report

10 October 2025	Thant – Vervloet (Belgium)	2–0	(Austria) Hammarberg – Hofstetter
10 October 2025	(21–7, 21–11); Report

10 October 2025	Valeria – Ramirez (Venezuela)	2–1	(Chile) Guerrero – Vasquez
10 October 2025	(18–21, 21–12, 15–13); Report

=== Pool G ===
Pos	Team	Pld	W	L	Pts	SW	SL	SR	SPW	SPL	SPR	Qualification
1	(Germany) Reformat – Dieckmann	3	2	1	5	5	2	2.500	136	102	1.333	Round of 16
2	(Brazil) Isabela – Ana Bia	3	2	1	5	4	2	2.000	118	98	1.204	Round of 24
3	(Puerto Rico) Arana – Valentin	3	2	1	5	4	3	1.333	117	125	0.936	Round of 24
4	(Egypt) Safy – Marwa	3	0	3	3	0	6	0.000	80	126	0.635	

8 October 2025	Reformat – Dieckmann (Germany)	2–0	(Egypt) Safy – Marwa
8 October 2025	(21–12, 21–10); Report

8 October 2025	Isabela – Ana Bia (Brazil)	2–0	(Puerto Rico) Arana – Valentin
8 October 2025	(21–13, 21–16); Report

9 October 2025	Reformat – Dieckmann (Germany)	1–2	(Puerto Rico) Arana – Valentin
9 October 2025	(18–21, 21–10, 13–15); Report

9 October 2025	Isabela – Ana Bia (Brazil)	2–0	(Egypt) Safy – Marwa
9 October 2025	(21–10, 21–17); Report

10 October 2025	Reformat – Dieckmann (Germany)	2–0	(Brazil) Isabela – Ana Bia
10 October 2025	(21–17, 21–17); Report

10 October 2025	Arana – Valentin (Puerto Rico)	2–0	(Egypt) Safy – Marwa
10 October 2025	(21–14, 21–17); Report

=== Pool H ===
Pos	Team	Pld	W	L	Pts	SW	SL	SR	SPW	SPL	SPR	Qualification
1	(Canada) Cochrane – Hancock	3	3	0	6	6	0	MAX	126	46	2.739	Round of 16
2	(The Gambia) Njie – Sambou	3	2	1	5	4	2	2.000	101	93	1.086	Round of 24
3	(Democratic Republic of the Congo) Moseka – Mayala	3	1	2	4	2	4	0.500	93	89	1.045	Round of 24
4	(Qatar) Lujain – Celine	3	0	3	3	0	6	0.000	34	126	0.270	

8 October 2025	Cochrane – Hancock (Canada)	2–0	(The Gambia) Njie – Sambou
8 October 2025	(21–11, 21–6); Report

8 October 2025	Lujain – Celine (Qatar)	0–2	(Democratic Republic of the Congo) Moseka – Mayala
8 October 2025	(2–21, 3–21); Report

9 October 2025	Lujain – Celine (Qatar)	0–2	(The Gambia) Njie – Sambou
9 October 2025	(12–21, 10–21); Report

9 October 2025	Cochrane – Hancock (Canada)	2–0	(Democratic Republic of the Congo) Moseka – Mayala
9 October 2025	(21–11, 21–11); Report

10 October 2025	Lujain – Celine (Qatar)	0–2	(Canada) Cochrane – Hancock
10 October 2025	(3–21, 4–21); Report

10 October 2025	Njie – Sambou (The Gambia)	2–0	(Democratic Republic of the Congo) Moseka – Mayala
10 October 2025	(21–11, 21–18); Report

== Knockout stage ==
=== Bracket ===
Round of 16
10 October
(United States) Scribner – Grimes	2
(Puerto Rico) Arana – Valentin	0
10 October
(Switzerland) Gähwiler – Eugster	1
(Brazil) Isabela – Ana Bia	2
10 October
(Belgium) Thant – Vervloet	2
(Mexico) Perez – Román	0
10 October
(Italy) Bruzzone – Lafuenti	2
(Venezuela) Valeria – Ramirez	0
11 October
(Netherlands) Radstake – Both	2
(Australia) Gaborit – Amstutz	0
11 October
(Canada) Cochrane – Hancock	2
(Hungary) Honti-Majoros – Matkovits	0
11 October
(Germany) Reformat – Dieckmann	2
(Brazil) Kiara – Leticia	0
11 October
(United States) Junk – Junk	2
(Hungary) Kiss-Bertók – Pádár	0

Quarter-finals
11 October
(United States) Scribner – Grimes	2
(Brazil) Isabela – Ana Bia	0
11 October
(Belgium) Thant – Vervloet	2
(Italy) Bruzzone – Lafuenti	1
11 October
(Netherlands) Radstake – Both	2
(Canada) Cochrane – Hancock	1
11 October
(Germany) Reformat – Dieckmann	1
(United States) Junk – Junk	2

Semi-finals
11 October
(United States) Scribner – Grimes	2
(Belgium) Thant – Vervloet	0
11 October
(Netherlands) Radstake – Both	1
(United States) Junk – Junk	2

Final
12 October
(United States) Scribner – Grimes	2
(United States) Junk – Junk	0
Third place
12 October
(Belgium) Thant – Vervloet	2
(Netherlands) Radstake – Both	1

=== Round of 24 ===
10 October 2025	Matyushenkova – Zelenakova (Slovakia)	1–2	(Puerto Rico) Arana – Valentin
10 October 2025	(21–17, 16–21, 15–17); Report

10 October 2025	Isabela – Ana Bia (Brazil)	2–0	(Malaysia) QARIESYA – Cadence
10 October 2025	(21–12, 23–21); Report

10 October 2025	Perez – Román (Mexico)	2–0	(Japan) Utsunomiya – Sawano
10 October 2025	(21–14, 21–16); Report

10 October 2025	Njie – Sambou (The Gambia)	0–2	(Venezuela) Valeria – Ramirez
10 October 2025	(9–21, 9–21); Report

10 October 2025	Hammarberg – Hofstetter (Austria)	0–2	(Australia) Gaborit – Amstutz
10 October 2025	(19–21, 18–21); Report

10 October 2025	Honti-Majoros – Matkovits (Hungary)	2–0	(Paraguay) MARTINEZ – VELAZQUEZ
10 October 2025	(21–13, 25–23); Report

10 October 2025	Kiara – Leticia (Brazil)	2–0	(Poland) Wolny – Przybyszewska
10 October 2025	(21–19, 21–16); Report

10 October 2025	Kiss-Bertók – Pádár (Hungary)	2–0	(Democratic Republic of the Congo) Moseka – Mayala
10 October 2025	(21–13, 21–16); Report

=== Round of 16 ===
10 October 2025	Scribner – Grimes (United States)	2–0	(Puerto Rico) Arana – Valentin
10 October 2025	(21–13, 21–15); Report

10 October 2025	Gähwiler – Eugster (Switzerland)	1–2	(Brazil) Isabela – Ana Bia
10 October 2025	(21–11, 16–21, 15–17); Report

10 October 2025	Thant – Vervloet (Belgium)	2–0	(Mexico) Perez – Román
10 October 2025	(21–8, 21–18); Report

10 October 2025	Bruzzone – Lafuenti (Italy)	2–0	(Venezuela) Valeria – Ramirez
10 October 2025	(21–11, 21–19); Report

11 October 2025	Radstake – Both (Netherlands)	2–0	(Australia) Gaborit – Amstutz
11 October 2025	(21–18, 21–13); Report

11 October 2025	Cochrane – Hancock (Canada)	2–0	(Hungary) Honti-Majoros – Matkovits
11 October 2025	(21–15, 21–13); Report

11 October 2025	Reformat – Dieckmann (Germany)	2–0	(Brazil) Kiara – Leticia
11 October 2025	(21–19, 21–18); Report

11 October 2025	Junk – Junk (United States)	2–0	(Hungary) Kiss-Bertók – Pádár
11 October 2025	(21–15, 21–15); Report

=== Quarterfinals ===
11 October 2025	Scribner – Grimes (United States)	2–0	(Brazil) Isabela – Ana Bia
11 October 2025	(21–19, 21–12); Report

11 October 2025	Thant – Vervloet (Belgium)	2–1	(Italy) Bruzzone – Lafuenti
11 October 2025	(18–21, 21–19, 15–9); Report

11 October 2025	Radstake – Both (Netherlands)	2–1	(Canada) Cochrane – Hancock
11 October 2025	(20–22, 21–17, 15–10); Report

11 October 2025	Reformat – Dieckmann (Germany)	1–2	(United States) Junk – Junk
11 October 2025	(21–19, 22–24, 13–15); Report

=== Semifinals ===
11 October 2025	Scribner – Grimes (United States)	2–0	(Belgium) Thant – Vervloet
11 October 2025	(21–19, 22–20); Report

11 October 2025	Radstake – Both (Netherlands)	1–2	(United States) Junk – Junk
11 October 2025	(21–18, 9–21, 10–15); Report

=== Third place game ===
12 October 2025	Thant – Vervloet (Belgium)	2–1	(Netherlands) Radstake – Both
12 October 2025	(21–8, 18–21, 15–8); Report

=== Final ===
12 October 2025	Scribner – Grimes (United States)	2–0	(United States) Junk – Junk
12 October 2025	(21–13, 24–22); Report

== Final ranking ==
Rank	Team
Gold medal	(United States) Scribner – Grimes
Silver medal	(United States) Junk – Junk
Bronze medal	(Belgium) Thant – Vervloet
4	(Netherlands) Radstake – Both
5	(Brazil) Isabela – Ana Bia
5	(Canada) Cochrane – Hancock
5	(Germany) Reformat – Dieckmann
5	(Italy) Bruzzone – Lafuenti
9	(Australia) Gaborit – Amstutz
9	(Brazil) Kiara – Leticia
9	(Hungary) Honti-Majoros – Matkovits
9	(Hungary) Kiss-Bertók – Pádár
9	(Mexico) Perez – Román
9	(Puerto Rico) Arana – Valentin
9	(Switzerland) Gähwiler – Eugster
9	(Venezuela) Valeria – Ramirez
17	(Austria) Hammarberg – Hofstetter
17	(Democratic Republic of the Congo) Moseka – Mayala
17	(The Gambia) Njie – Sambou
17	(Japan) Utsunomiya – Sawano
17	(Malaysia) QARIESYA – Cadence
17	(Paraguay) MARTINEZ – VELAZQUEZ
17	(Poland) Wolny – Przybyszewska
17	(Slovakia) Matyushenkova – Zelenakova
25	(Chile) Guerrero – Vasquez
25	(China) Fan Yuhan – Zhuang Ming
25	(Ecuador) VALENTINA – Nuñez
25	(Egypt) Safy – Marwa
25	(Morocco) Marwa – Bouysfi
25	(Qatar) Lujain – Celine
25	(Qatar) Penda – Meriem
25	(Thailand) Varagkhana – Natthawiw
33	(Canada) Slean – Schad
33	(Latvia) Mamaja – Aleksāne
33	(Turkey) Dogan – Yildirim
36	(Australia) McDonell – Longmuir
36	(Burundi) Carene – Ornella
36	(Burundi) Nasalette – Penelope
36	(Germany) Otte – Richter
36	(Latvia) Šauberga – Krieva
36	(Norway) Finholth – Skarlund
36	(Senegal) SEGNANE – SARR
36	(Ukraine) Shkurat – Vapniar
