= 2024 FIVB Beach Volleyball U19 World Championships – Women's tournament =

Tournament details
- Host country: China
- City: Shangluo
- Dates: 27 August–1 September
- Teams: (from 5 confederations)

Final positions
- Champions: United States; Myriah Massey; Lily Davis (1st title)
- Runners-up: Spain; Sofía Izuzquiza Corulla; Marta Carro Márquez de Acuña
- Third place: United States; Sally Perez; Sarah Wood
- Fourth place: Thailand; Varagkhana Sogalee; Somruedee Koedkaew

The 2024 FIVB Beach Volleyball U19 World Championships – Women's tournament was held from 27 August to 1 September 2024.

== Preliminary round ==
=== Pool A ===
Pos	Team	Pld	W	L	Pts	SW	SL	SR	SPW	SPL	SPR	Qualification
1	(Spain) Izuzquiza – Carro M	3	3	0	6	6	0	MAX	126	70	1.800	Round of 16
2	(China) Fu Yufei – K.X. Zhang	3	2	1	5	4	3	1.333	84	93	0.903	Round of 24
3	(Turkey) Simdim – Ceylin	3	1	2	4	3	4	0.750	114	120	0.950	Round of 24
4	(Argentina) Schnidrig – Sancer	3	0	3	3	0	6	0.000	43	126	0.341	

28 August 2024	Fu Yufei – K.X. Zhang (China)	2–1	(Turkey) Simdim – Ceylin
28 August 2024	(21–19, 18–21, 15–11); Report

28 August 2024	Schnidrig – Sancer (Argentina)	0–2	(Spain) Izuzquiza – Carro M
28 August 2024	(10–21, 9–21); Report

28 August 2024	Fu Yufei – K.X. Zhang (China)	0–2	(Spain) Izuzquiza – Carro M
28 August 2024	(17–21, 13–21); Report

28 August 2024	Schnidrig – Sancer (Argentina)	0–2	(Turkey) Simdim – Ceylin
28 August 2024	(12–21, 12–21); Report

29 August 2024	Fu Yufei – K.X. Zhang (China)	2–0	(Argentina) Schnidrig – Sancer
29 August 2024	Report

29 August 2024	Izuzquiza – Carro M (Spain)	2–0	(Turkey) Simdim – Ceylin
29 August 2024	(21–8, 21–13); Report

=== Pool B ===
Pos	Team	Pld	W	L	Pts	SW	SL	SR	SPW	SPL	SPR	Qualification
1	(United States) Perez – Wood	3	3	0	6	6	0	MAX	126	65	1.938	Round of 16
2	(Latvia) Mamaja – Krieva P.	3	2	1	5	4	2	2.000	106	103	1.029	Round of 24
3	(Costa Rica) Sofía V – Molina	3	1	2	4	2	5	0.400	109	132	0.826	Round of 24
4	(Kazakhstan) Peressetskaya – Karimova	3	0	3	3	1	6	0.167	95	136	0.699	

28 August 2024	Perez – Wood (United States)	2–0	(Latvia) Mamaja – Krieva P.
28 August 2024	(21–9, 21–13); Report

28 August 2024	Sofía V – Molina (Costa Rica)	2–1	(Kazakhstan) Peressetskaya – Karimova
28 August 2024	(21–14, 16–21, 15–13); Report

28 August 2024	Perez – Wood (United States)	2–0	(Kazakhstan) Peressetskaya – Karimova
28 August 2024	(21–13, 21–8); Report

28 August 2024	Sofía V – Molina (Costa Rica)	0–2	(Latvia) Mamaja – Krieva P.
28 August 2024	(17–21, 18–21); Report

29 August 2024	Perez – Wood (United States)	2–0	(Costa Rica) Sofía V – Molina
29 August 2024	(21–10, 21–12); Report

29 August 2024	Peressetskaya – Karimova (Kazakhstan)	0–2	(Latvia) Mamaja – Krieva P.
29 August 2024	(14–21, 12–21); Report

=== Pool C ===
Pos	Team	Pld	W	L	Pts	SW	SL	SR	SPW	SPL	SPR	Qualification
1	(Canada) Odigie – Kok	3	3	0	6	6	0	MAX	126	93	1.355	Round of 16
2	(Belgium) Piret – Bex	3	2	1	5	4	2	2.000	117	96	1.219	Round of 24
3	(Colombia) Gaviria – Franco	3	1	2	4	2	5	0.400	110	129	0.853	Round of 24
4	(Malaysia) QARIESYA – Auni	3	0	3	3	1	6	0.167	103	138	0.746	

28 August 2024	Odigie – Kok (Canada)	2–0	(Belgium) Piret – Bex
28 August 2024	(21–17, 21–16); Report

28 August 2024	QARIESYA – Auni (Malaysia)	1–2	(Colombia) Gaviria – Franco
28 August 2024	(16–21, 21–18, 8–15); Report

28 August 2024	Odigie – Kok (Canada)	2–0	(Colombia) Gaviria – Franco
28 August 2024	(21–17, 21–15); Report

28 August 2024	QARIESYA – Auni (Malaysia)	0–2	(Belgium) Piret – Bex
28 August 2024	(17–21, 13–21); Report

29 August 2024	Odigie – Kok (Canada)	2–0	(Malaysia) QARIESYA – Auni
29 August 2024	(21–12, 21–16); Report

29 August 2024	Gaviria – Franco (Colombia)	0–2	(Belgium) Piret – Bex
29 August 2024	(11–21, 13–21); Report

=== Pool D ===
Pos	Team	Pld	W	L	Pts	SW	SL	SR	SPW	SPL	SPR	Qualification
1	(United States) Massey – Davis	3	2	1	5	5	3	1.667	152	121	1.256	Round of 16
2	(Brazil) Julhia – Marcela	3	2	1	5	5	3	1.667	103	102	1.010	Round of 24
3	(Australia) Rayner – Zajer	3	2	1	5	5	3	1.667	137	140	0.979	Round of 24
4	(Nigeria) Esther M – Pamela	3	0	3	3	0	6	0.000	55	126	0.437	

28 August 2024	Julhia – Marcela (Brazil)	2–1	(United States) Massey – Davis
28 August 2024	(23–21, 13–21, 15–13); Report

28 August 2024	Rayner – Zajer (Australia)	2–0	(Nigeria) Esther M – Pamela
28 August 2024	(21–16, 21–17); Report

28 August 2024	Julhia – Marcela (Brazil)	2–0	(Nigeria) Esther M – Pamela
28 August 2024	Report

28 August 2024	Rayner – Zajer (Australia)	1–2	(United States) Massey – Davis
28 August 2024	(21–19, 14–21, 13–15); Report

29 August 2024	Julhia – Marcela (Brazil)	1–2	(Australia) Rayner – Zajer
29 August 2024	(19–21, 21–11, 12–15); Report

29 August 2024	Esther M – Pamela (Nigeria)	0–2	(United States) Massey – Davis
29 August 2024	(14–21, 8–21); Report

=== Pool E ===
Pos	Team	Pld	W	L	Pts	SW	SL	SR	SPW	SPL	SPR	Qualification
1	(Germany) Neuß – Reformat	3	3	0	6	6	0	MAX	126	77	1.636	Round of 16
2	(Czech Republic) Nosálková – Cyrani	3	2	1	5	4	2	2.000	111	100	1.110	Round of 24
3	(Japan) Mori – Utsugi	3	1	2	4	2	4	0.500	98	116	0.845	Round of 24
4	(Paraguay) Ortiz – Perez	3	0	3	3	0	6	0.000	84	126	0.667	

28 August 2024	Ortiz – Perez (Paraguay)	0–2	(Czech Republic) Nosálková – Cyrani
28 August 2024	(15–21, 11–21); Report

28 August 2024	Neuß – Reformat (Germany)	2–0	(Japan) Mori – Utsugi
28 August 2024	(21–10, 21–14); Report

28 August 2024	Ortiz – Perez (Paraguay)	0–2	(Japan) Mori – Utsugi
28 August 2024	(16–21, 16–21); Report

28 August 2024	Neuß – Reformat (Germany)	2–0	(Czech Republic) Nosálková – Cyrani
28 August 2024	(21–14, 21–13); Report

29 August 2024	Ortiz – Perez (Paraguay)	0–2	(Germany) Neuß – Reformat
29 August 2024	(12–21, 14–21); Report

29 August 2024	Mori – Utsugi (Japan)	0–2	(Czech Republic) Nosálková – Cyrani
29 August 2024	(15–21, 17–21); Report

=== Pool F ===
Pos	Team	Pld	W	L	Pts	SW	SL	SR	SPW	SPL	SPR	Qualification
1	(Netherlands) Veerbeek – Hogenhout	3	3	0	6	6	0	MAX	126	82	1.537	Round of 16
2	(Thailand) Varagkhana – Somruedee	3	2	1	5	4	2	2.000	111	97	1.144	Round of 24
3	(Hungary) Szabó – Zolnai	3	1	2	4	2	5	0.400	108	133	0.812	Round of 24
4	(Uruguay) Lucas M. – López	3	0	3	3	1	6	0.167	99	132	0.750	

28 August 2024	Veerbeek – Hogenhout (Netherlands)	2–0	(Hungary) Szabó – Zolnai
28 August 2024	(21–12, 21–15); Report

28 August 2024	Varagkhana – Somruedee (Thailand)	2–0	(Uruguay) Lucas M. – López
28 August 2024	(21–15, 21–7); Report

28 August 2024	Veerbeek – Hogenhout (Netherlands)	2–0	(Uruguay) Lucas M. – López
28 August 2024	(21–12, 21–16); Report

28 August 2024	Varagkhana – Somruedee (Thailand)	2–0	(Hungary) Szabó – Zolnai
28 August 2024	(21–16, 21–17); Report

29 August 2024	Veerbeek – Hogenhout (Netherlands)	2–0	(Thailand) Varagkhana – Somruedee
29 August 2024	(21–13, 21–14); Report

29 August 2024	Lucas M. – López (Uruguay)	1–2	(Hungary) Szabó – Zolnai
29 August 2024	(16–21, 21–12, 12–15); Report

=== Pool G ===
Pos	Team	Pld	W	L	Pts	SW	SL	SR	SPW	SPL	SPR	Qualification
1	(France) Duval – Sobezalz	3	3	0	6	6	1	6.000	93	81	1.148	Round of 16
2	(Switzerland) Bossart – Stolz	3	2	1	5	5	2	2.500	92	74	1.243	Round of 24
3	(Mexico) Cruz – Torres	3	1	2	4	2	4	0.500	54	84	0.643	Round of 24
4	(Czech Republic) Lajkebová – Kleiblova	3	0	3	3	0	6	0.000	0	126	0.000	

28 August 2024	Bossart – Stolz (Switzerland)	2–0	(Mexico) Cruz – Torres
28 August 2024	(21–13, 21–10); Report

28 August 2024	Lajkebová – Kleiblova (Czech Republic)	0–2	(France) Duval – Sobezalz
28 August 2024	Report

28 August 2024	Bossart – Stolz (Switzerland)	1–2	(France) Duval – Sobezalz
28 August 2024	(16–21, 21–15, 13–15); Report

28 August 2024	Lajkebová – Kleiblova (Czech Republic)	0–2	(Mexico) Cruz – Torres
28 August 2024	Report

29 August 2024	Bossart – Stolz (Switzerland)	2–0	(Czech Republic) Lajkebová – Kleiblova
29 August 2024	Report

29 August 2024	Duval – Sobezalz (France)	2–0	(Mexico) Cruz – Torres
29 August 2024	(21–16, 21–15); Report

=== Pool H ===
Pos	Team	Pld	W	L	Pts	SW	SL	SR	SPW	SPL	SPR	Qualification
1	(Austria) Berger – Hohenauer L.	3	3	0	6	6	0	MAX	127	77	1.649	Round of 16
2	(China) Lei Y.J. – Qi S.Y.	3	2	1	5	4	2	2.000	121	88	1.375	Round of 24
3	(Morocco) Aida – Imane	3	1	2	4	2	4	0.500	86	103	0.835	Round of 24
4	(Trinidad and Tobago) Roberts – Johnson	3	0	3	3	0	6	0.000	60	126	0.476	

28 August 2024	Lei Y.J. – Qi S.Y. (China)	2–0	(Trinidad and Tobago) Roberts – Johnson
28 August 2024	(21–8, 21–12); Report

28 August 2024	Berger – Hohenauer L. (Austria)	2–0	(Morocco) Aida – Imane
28 August 2024	(21–9, 21–10); Report

28 August 2024	Berger – Hohenauer L. (Austria)	2–0	(Trinidad and Tobago) Roberts – Johnson
28 August 2024	(21–11, 21–10); Report

28 August 2024	Lei Y.J. – Qi S.Y. (China)	2–0	(Morocco) Aida – Imane
28 August 2024	(21–14, 21–11); Report

29 August 2024	Lei Y.J. – Qi S.Y. (China)	0–2	(Austria) Berger – Hohenauer L.
29 August 2024	(20–22, 17–21); Report

29 August 2024	Aida – Imane (Morocco)	2–0	(Trinidad and Tobago) Roberts – Johnson
29 August 2024	(21–6, 21–13); Report

== Knockout stage ==
=== Bracket ===
Round of 16
30 August
(United States) Perez – Wood	2
(Japan) Mori – Utsugi	0
30 August
(France) Duval – Sobezalz	2
(China) Lei Y.J. – Qi S.Y.	0
30 August
(Netherlands) Veerbeek – Hogenhout	1
(Belgium) Piret – Bex	2
30 August
(United States) Massey – Davis	2
(Turkey) Simdim – Ceylin	0
30 August
(Canada) Odigie – Kok	1
(Australia) Rayner – Zajer	2
30 August
(Germany) Neuß – Reformat	1
(Thailand) Varagkhana – Somruedee	2
30 August
(Austria) Berger – Hohenauer L.	0
(Switzerland) Bossart – Stolz	2
30 August
(Spain) Izuzquiza – Carro M	2
(Brazil) Julhia – Marcela	1

Quarter-finals
31 August
(United States) Perez – Wood	2
(France) Duval – Sobezalz	0
31 August
(Belgium) Piret – Bex	1
(United States) Massey – Davis	2
31 August
(Australia) Rayner – Zajer	0
(Thailand) Varagkhana – Somruedee	2
31 August
(Switzerland) Bossart – Stolz	1
(Spain) Izuzquiza – Carro M	2

Semi-finals
31 August
(United States) Perez – Wood	1
(United States) Massey – Davis	2
31 August
(Thailand) Varagkhana – Somruedee	1
(Spain) Izuzquiza – Carro M	2

Final
1 September
(United States) Massey – Davis	2
(Spain) Izuzquiza – Carro M	0
Third place
1 September
(United States) Perez – Wood	2
(Thailand) Varagkhana – Somruedee	0

=== Round of 24 ===
30 August 2024	Fu Yufei – K.X. Zhang (China)	0–2	(Japan) Mori – Utsugi
30 August 2024	(8–21, 10–21); Report

30 August 2024	Piret – Bex (Belgium)	2–0	(Mexico) Cruz – Torres
30 August 2024	(21–12, 21–14); Report

30 August 2024	Mamaja – Krieva P. (Latvia)	0–2	(Turkey) Simdim – Ceylin
30 August 2024	(14–21, 17–21); Report

30 August 2024	Julhia – Marcela (Brazil)	2–0	(Morocco) Aida – Imane
30 August 2024	(21–8, 21–8); Report

30 August 2024	Lei Y.J. – Qi S.Y. (China)	2–1	(Hungary) Szabó – Zolnai
30 August 2024	(15–21, 21–16, 15–12); Report

30 August 2024	Nosálková – Cyrani (Czech Republic)	0–2	(Australia) Rayner – Zajer
30 August 2024	(13–21, 14–21); Report

30 August 2024	Varagkhana – Somruedee (Thailand)	2–0	(Colombia) Gaviria – Franco
30 August 2024	(21–19, 21–14); Report

30 August 2024	Bossart – Stolz (Switzerland)	2–0	(Costa Rica) Sofía V – Molina
30 August 2024	(21–9, 21–10); Report

=== Round of 16 ===
30 August 2024	Veerbeek – Hogenhout (Netherlands)	1–2	(Belgium) Piret – Bex
30 August 2024	(14–21, 21–16, 6–15); Report

30 August 2024	Massey – Davis (United States)	2–0	(Turkey) Simdim – Ceylin
30 August 2024	(21–9, 21–19); Report

30 August 2024	Izuzquiza – Carro M (Spain)	2–1	(Brazil) Julhia – Marcela
30 August 2024	(22–24, 28–26, 15–11); Report

30 August 2024	Odigie – Kok (Canada)	1–2	(Australia) Rayner – Zajer
30 August 2024	(18–21, 24–22, 13–15); Report

30 August 2024	Neuß – Reformat (Germany)	1–2	(Thailand) Varagkhana – Somruedee
30 August 2024	(21–18, 14–21, 12–15); Report

30 August 2024	Berger – Hohenauer L. (Austria)	0–2	(Switzerland) Bossart – Stolz
30 August 2024	(16–21, 18–21); Report

30 August 2024	Perez – Wood (United States)	2–0	(Japan) Mori – Utsugi
30 August 2024	(21–17, 21–17); Report

30 August 2024	Duval – Sobezalz (France)	2–0	(China) Lei Y.J. – Qi S.Y.
30 August 2024	(21–15, 21–14); Report

=== Quarterfinals ===
31 August 2024	Perez – Wood (United States)	2–0	(France) Duval – Sobezalz
31 August 2024	(21–14, 21–17); Report

31 August 2024	Piret – Bex (Belgium)	1–2	(United States) Massey – Davis
31 August 2024	(21–18, 18–21, 9–15); Report

31 August 2024	Rayner – Zajer (Australia)	0–2	(Thailand) Varagkhana – Somruedee
31 August 2024	(13–21, 18–21); Report

31 August 2024	Bossart – Stolz (Switzerland)	1–2	(Spain) Izuzquiza – Carro M
31 August 2024	(21–15, 15–21, 11–15); Report

=== Semifinals ===
31 August 2024	Perez – Wood (United States)	1–2	(United States) Massey – Davis
31 August 2024	(21–12, 19–21, 5–15); Report

31 August 2024	Varagkhana – Somruedee (Thailand)	1–2	(Spain) Izuzquiza – Carro M
31 August 2024	(14–21, 21–13, 10–15); Report

=== Third place game ===
1 September 2024	Perez – Wood (United States)	2–0	(Thailand) Varagkhana – Somruedee
1 September 2024	(21–17, 21–16); Report

=== Final ===
1 September 2024	Massey – Davis (United States)	2–0	(Spain) Izuzquiza – Carro M
1 September 2024	(21–16, 21–16); Report

== Final ranking ==
Rank	Team
Gold medal	(United States) Massey – Davis
Silver medal	(Spain) Izuzquiza – Carro M
Bronze medal	(United States) Perez – Wood
4	(Thailand) Varagkhana – Somruedee
5	(Australia) Rayner – Zajer
5	(Belgium) Piret – Bex
5	(France) Duval – Sobezalz
5	(Switzerland) Bossart – Stolz
9	(Austria) Berger – Hohenauer L.
9	(Brazil) Julhia – Marcela
9	(Canada) Odigie – Kok
9	(China) Lei Y.J. – Qi S.Y.
9	(Germany) Neuß – Reformat
9	(Japan) Mori – Utsugi
9	(Netherlands) Veerbeek – Hogenhout
9	(Turkey) Simdim – Ceylin
17	(China) Fu Yufei – K.X. Zhang
17	(Colombia) Gaviria – Franco
17	(Costa Rica) Sofía V – Molina
17	(Czech Republic) Nosálková – Cyrani
17	(Hungary) Szabó – Zolnai
17	(Latvia) Mamaja – Krieva P.
17	(Morocco) Aida – Imane
17	(Mexico) Cruz – Torres
25	(Argentina) Schnidrig – Sancer
25	(Czech Republic) Lajkebová – Kleiblova
25	(Kazakhstan) Peressetskaya – Karimova
25	(Malaysia) QARIESYA – Auni
25	(Nigeria) Esther M – Pamela
25	(Paraguay) Ortiz – Perez
25	(Trinidad and Tobago) Roberts – Johnson
25	(Uruguay) Lucas M. – López
33	(Finland) Mäenpää – Hirvonen
33	(Germany) Dieckmann – Dreßen
35	(Australia) Maric – Conlon
35	(China) Wang J.Y. – Z.H. Wu
35	(Israel) Lavie – Gonzalez
35	(Italy) Moretti – Novello
35	(Malaysia) Cadence – Rachael
35	(Poland) Radelczuk – Labuz
35	(Thailand) O.Piyathida – S.Orathai
35	(Ukraine) Kovalchuk – Vapniar
43	(Brazil) Ana Bia – Maria Julia
43	(Canada) Cochrane – Hancock
43	(China) J.Y. Lin – Zhang J.B.
43	(Hong Kong) S.H. Gee – L.C. Cheung
43	(Latvia) Gintere – Runce
43	(Poland) Rapczynska – Wolny
43	(Chinese Taipei) Hsu C.N. – CHUANG H.T.
