= Volleyball in Canada =

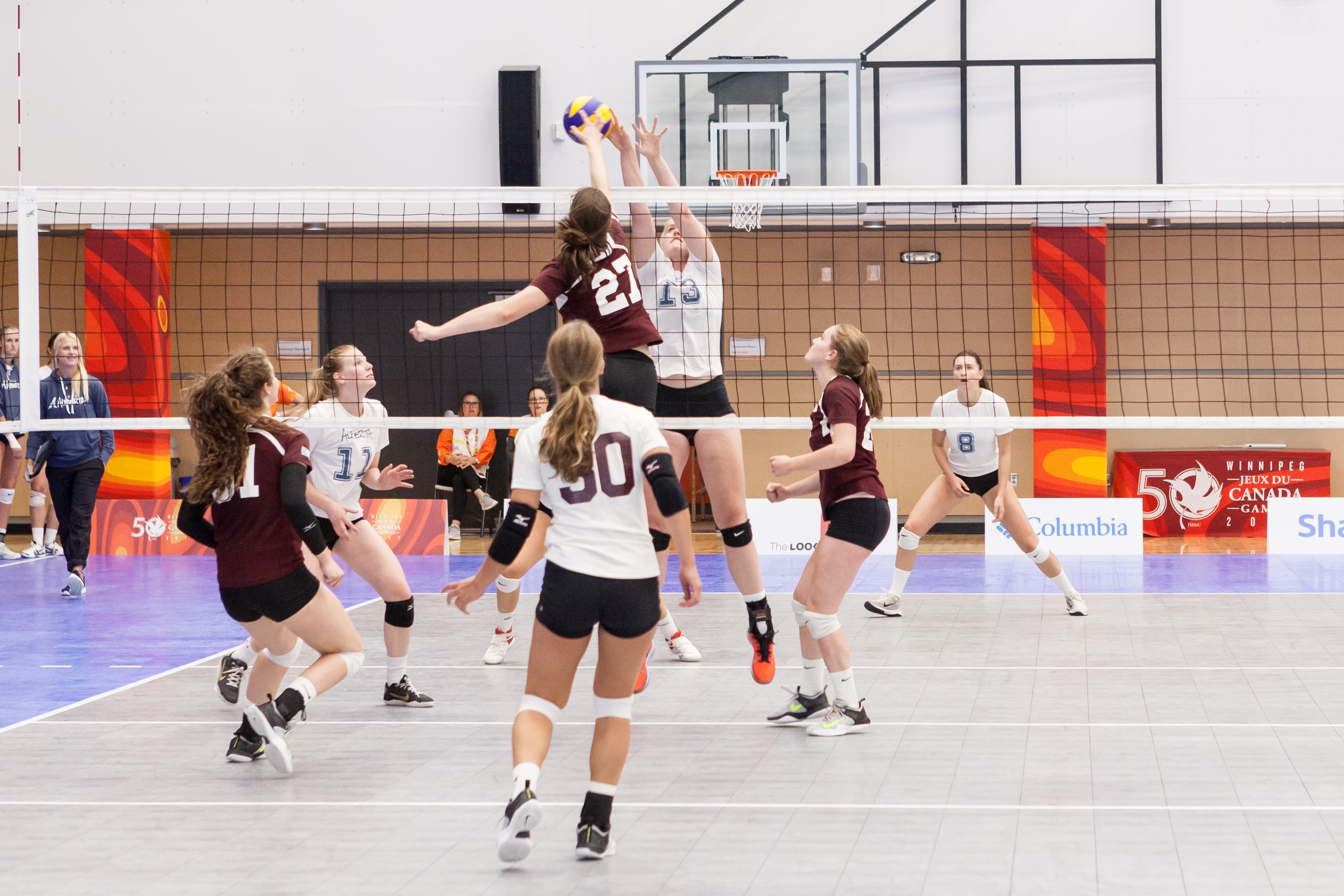
- A game of volleyball between the Albertan and the Newfoundland and Labrador teams during the 2017 Canada Games
- Country: Canada
- Governing body: Volleyball Canada
- National team(s): Men's national team; Women's national team
- First played: 1900 (Ottawa, Ontario)

International competitions
- FIVB Men's/Women's World Championship; FIVB Men's/Women's World Cup; Summer Olympics

Volleyball in Canada dates back to the beginning of the 20th century. Today, the sport is played at various levels of competition throughout the country.

== History ==
Volleyball was invented in the United States in 1895 and made its first appearance in Canada in 1900 when an Ottawa branch of the YMCA included it in its schedule. The sport caught on and soon spread to YMCAs in Toronto and Montreal. These centers conducted various tournaments, which were, for a long time, the only organized manifestations of the sport in Canada. While the sport spread throughout the United States, Russia and Asia before the First World War, it lay relatively dormant in Canada. With the creation of the Federation Internationale de Volleyball (FIVB) shortly after the Second World War, the sport gained international recognition.

Canada joined the FIVB in 1953, the same year the Canadian Volleyball Association was founded. Gordon Odell served as interim president before Wes McVicar took over as the association's first president. The current president, Dave Carey, oversees an organization of over 80,000 members. Renamed Volleyball Canada (VC), the association has its headquarters in Ottawa. When founded, VC was divided into three regions: Ottawa, Toronto and Montreal. Today, the regions are drawn along provincial/territorial lines and take in the whole of Canada.

Canada's first international experience in the sport took place in 1959 at the Pan-American Games in Chicago. Today, the Canadian teams strive to qualify for all of the international tournaments for which they are eligible. Since 1976, both the Men's and Women's indoor National Teams have participated in the Olympic Games and the World Championships on several occasions. The best result for both the Men's and Women's teams was achieved at the 1984 Olympic Games in Los Angeles where they finished 4th and 8th respectively. In 1998, Volleyball Canada became the umbrella organization for the national disabled volleyball program, a program that has had continued success since this partnership. The National Men's Standing Disabled Volleyball Team brought home Volleyball Canada's first gold medal at the 2002 World Championships in Poland, and went on to defend its title in 2004.

=== Major volleyball events ===
- 1895 - William G. Morgan invented volleyball
- 1947 - The FIVB (Fédération International de Volley-Ball) is founded
- 1949 - Prague, First Men's World Championship
- 1952 - Moscow, First Women's World Championship
- 1953 - First Canadian Championship
- 1959 - Canadian Men's National Volleyball Team first participates in International Competition (Pan Am Games)
- 1964 - Tokyo, First Olympic titles are awarded to Japan (Women's) and USSR (Men's)
- 1968 - Canada and USA join the Central American and Caribbean Zone, which thereafter becomes known as NORCECA
- 1972 - First international medal won by the Canadian Men's Team by placing third at the NORCECA Championship in Mexico
- 1976 - Canada hosts Montreal Olympic Games
- 1977 - First Junior Men's and Women's World Championships
- 1977 - Canada's Men's Team wins bronze medal at the Pan Am Games – first major game medal
- 1980 - 1st Gold Medal won by Canada internationally - NORCECA Junior's - Women (Calgary, Canada)
- 1983 - Canada hosts Universiade Games in Edmonton. Canadian men qualify for 1984 Olympics by defeating Cuba
- 1984 - Canadian men finish fourth at Los Angeles Olympic Games
- 1990 - FIVB introduces the World League
- 1991 - Canadian Men participate for the first time in the World League
- 1991 - Canada hosts NORCECA Championships in Regina and Team Canada Men qualifies for 1992 Olympics
- 1996 - Canada hosts NORCECA Olympic qualifiers for Men and Women
- 1996 - Team Canada Women participate in Atlanta Olympics
- 1996 - Beach Volleyball debuts as a full medal sport in Atlanta Olympic Games
- 1996 - Canadians John Child and Mark Heese win bronze medal for beach volleyball in Atlanta Olympics
- 1998 - Canadian Men's Junior National Team wins at NORCECA to qualify for Junior World Championships
- 1999 - Canada returns to Men's World League and plays in it for the 1999 and 2000 seasons
- 1999 - Canada hosts Women's World Junior Championships in Saskatoon/Edmonton
- 1999 - Canada wins the bronze medal for Men's Indoor and the gold medal for Men's Beach (Conrad Leinemann/Jody Holden) at the *1999 Pan Am Games in Winnipeg
- 1999 - New Rules of the game
- 2000 - Canada's Men's Standing Disabled team wins silver medal at the 2000 Sydney Paralympic Games
- 2002 - Canada's Men's and Women's Indoor National Teams qualify for World Championships
- 2002 - Canada's Men's Standing Disabled team wins gold medal at the 2002 World Disabled Volleyball Championships World Organization Volleyball for Disabled

== See also ==
- Canada men's national volleyball team
- Canada women's national volleyball team
- Canada men's junior national volleyball team
